= American Century Championship =

Celebrity golf tournament in Nevada, United States

Tournament information
- Location: Stateline, Nevada, U.S.
- Established: 1990, 36 years ago
- Course: Edgewood Tahoe Resort
- Par: 72
- Length: 6,709 yards (6,135 m)
- Organized by: Edgewood Tahoe Resort
- Tour: Celebrity event
- Format: Stroke play (1990–2003): 54 holes Modified Stableford (2004–present): 54 holes
- Prize fund: $750,000
- Month played: July
- Website: edgewoodtahoe.com/event/american-century-championship

Tournament record score
- Aggregate: Billy Joe Tolliver (2010)

Current champion
- (United States) Mardy Fish

Location map
- Location in United States Location in Nevada

The American Century Championship is a celebrity golf tournament that takes place at Edgewood Tahoe Resort, on the shore of Lake Tahoe in Nevada, United States. The tournament is held annually, during the weekend after the second full week of July. It has a number of traditions, including the Long Drive Challenge, Charity Chip Challenge, and the Korbel Hole-In-One Contest. American Century Investments is the current title sponsor of the tournament, which previously was known as the Celebrity Golf Tournament, the Isuzu Celebrity Golf Championship, and the American Century Celebrity Golf Championship.

Rick Rhoden has won the most American Century Championships, with eight between 1991 and 2009. Dan Quinn won five between 1992 and 2012. Billy Joe Tolliver won four between 1996 and 2013. Three have won three titles at Edgewood: Mark Mulder, Tony Romo, and Mardy Fish. Two have won two titles at Edgewood: Actor Jack Wagner and Mark Rypien. Wagner is the only non-professional athlete to have won the event, and Mulder is the only one to win three consecutive times. The profession with the most wins is football (12), followed by baseball (11), ice hockey (7), tennis (3), acting (2), and basketball (2). Only five times in the history of the tournament has an active professional athlete emerged as the winner; Mark Rypien (1990), Dan Quinn (1992), Billy Joe Tolliver (1996), Al Del Greco (2000), and Stephen Curry (2023).

== History ==
=== Edgewood Tahoe Resort ===
The tournament has been played every year at Edgewood Tahoe Resort, a golf resort in the western United States, on the south shore of Lake Tahoe, in Stateline, Nevada. The site where Edgewood now stands was previously part of a ranch adjacent to Friday's Station, the historic 19th-century Pony Express station and inn. The Park family bought the ranch in 1896 to raise cattle, and in the 1960s they decided to build a golf course on their property. The course was designed by George Fazio, and opened along with the resort in 1968. The course is at the southeast edge of the lake, at an average elevation exceeding 6,230 feet (1,900 m) above sea level. Fazio's nephew Tom Fazio has renovated the course, now 7,379 yards (6,747 m), from time to time.

=== 1990s: Early tournament years ===
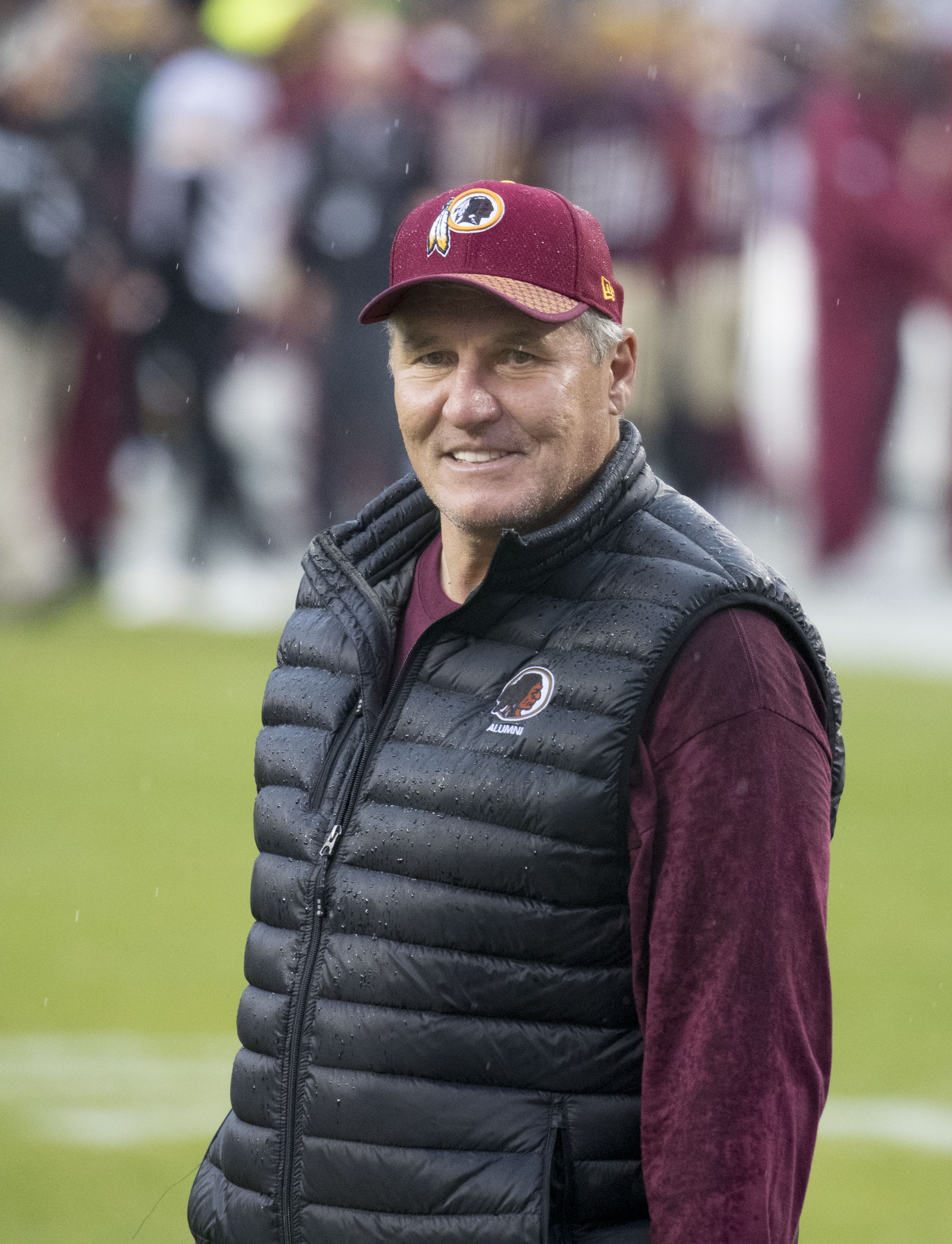
Mark Rypien, the inaugural winner, two-time champion, and 2014 Hole-In-One Contest winner.

On Friday, July 13, 1990, in Round One of the first annual Celebrity Golf Championship, Denver Broncos quarterback John Elway shot 70, with former quarterback Steve Bartkowski and former MLB player and manager Davey Johnson both trailing by one. On Saturday, July 14, in Round Two, Bartkowski lead after two rounds with 146 strokes, followed by actor Jack Wagner with 147, and former Miami Dolphins safety Dick Anderson and Johnson with 148 each. On Sunday, July 15, in Round Three, Washington Redskins quarterback Mark Rypien came storming back and won the inaugural tournament with a total of 221 strokes. He is the first Canadian and quarterback to win the tournament. Rypien's 221 total strokes through three rounds is the highest ever by the winner under stroke play. Anderson finished in second place with 222 and Wagner finished in third place with 223.

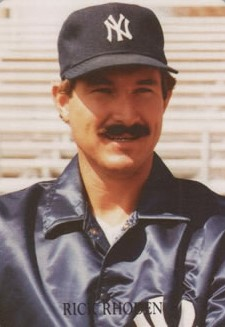
Rick Rhoden has eight wins, six second place finishes, and 14 top two finishes, all tournament records.

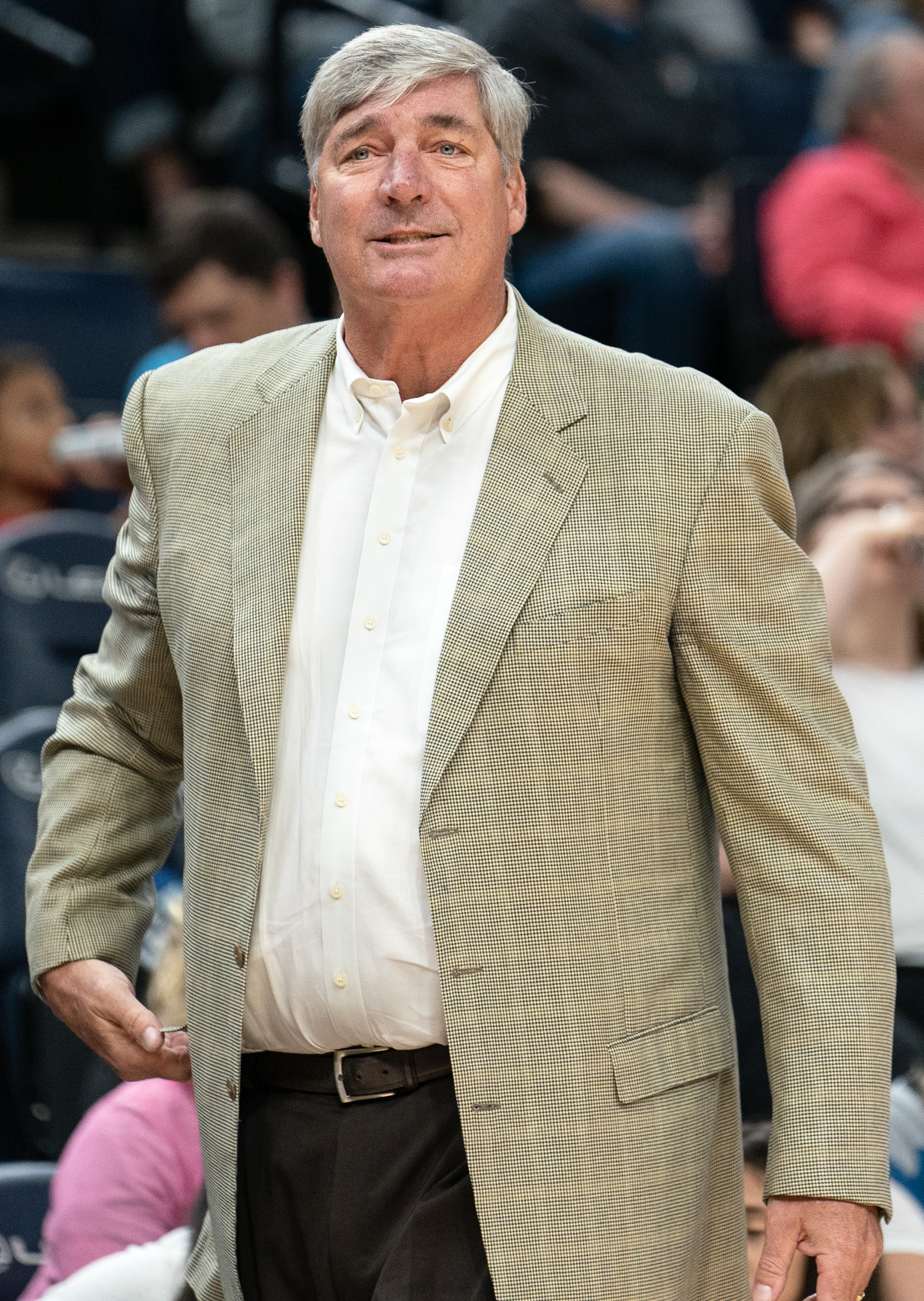
Bill Laimbeer, 1991 runner-up and 1993 Long Drive winner.

On Friday, July 5, 1991, in Round One of the second annual tournament, Anderson shot 68, with Detroit Pistons center Bill Laimbeer and Bartkowski both trailing by four. On Saturday, July 6, in Round Two, Bartkowski again lead after two rounds, again with 146 strokes, followed by former ice hockey player Clark Gillies with 147, and former MLB pitcher Rick Rhoden, Laimbeer, Philadelphia Flyers center Dan Quinn, Anderson, and Wagner with 148 each. On Sunday, July 7, in Round Three, Rhoden and Laimbeer both finished with 221 total strokes each, going to the first sudden-death playoff in tournament history. The leaders' 221 total strokes through three rounds tied the record set the previous year for the highest ever under stroke play. Gillies, Quinn, Johnson, and Anderson all tied for third place with 223 total strokes, setting the record for the most people tying for third place. On the first hole of the sudden-death playoff, Laimbeer hit five consecutive shots into the pond protecting the 18th hole to the left. Since then, the pond has been known as "Lake Laimbeer". Rhoden won, making him the second person to win in his tournament debut. He also became the first American, baseball player, and pitcher to win the event.

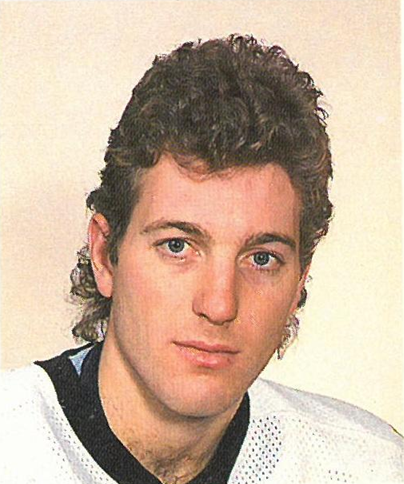
Dan Quinn has five wins, the second most in tournament history.

In Round One of the third annual Isuzu Celebrity Golf Championship on Friday in 1992, former ice hockey player Pierre Larouche shot 70, with Anderson and former NFL placekicker Jan Stenerud both trailing by one. After Round Two on Saturday, Quinn, Rhoden, Anderson, and Larouche were all tied for the lead with 143 strokes each. In Round Three on Sunday, Quinn won the event in 213 total strokes, making him the first ice hockey player to win the event. He is the second Canadian to win the event, giving Canada the most victories in the history of the tournament. Rhoden and Anderson tied for second place one stroke behind Quinn.

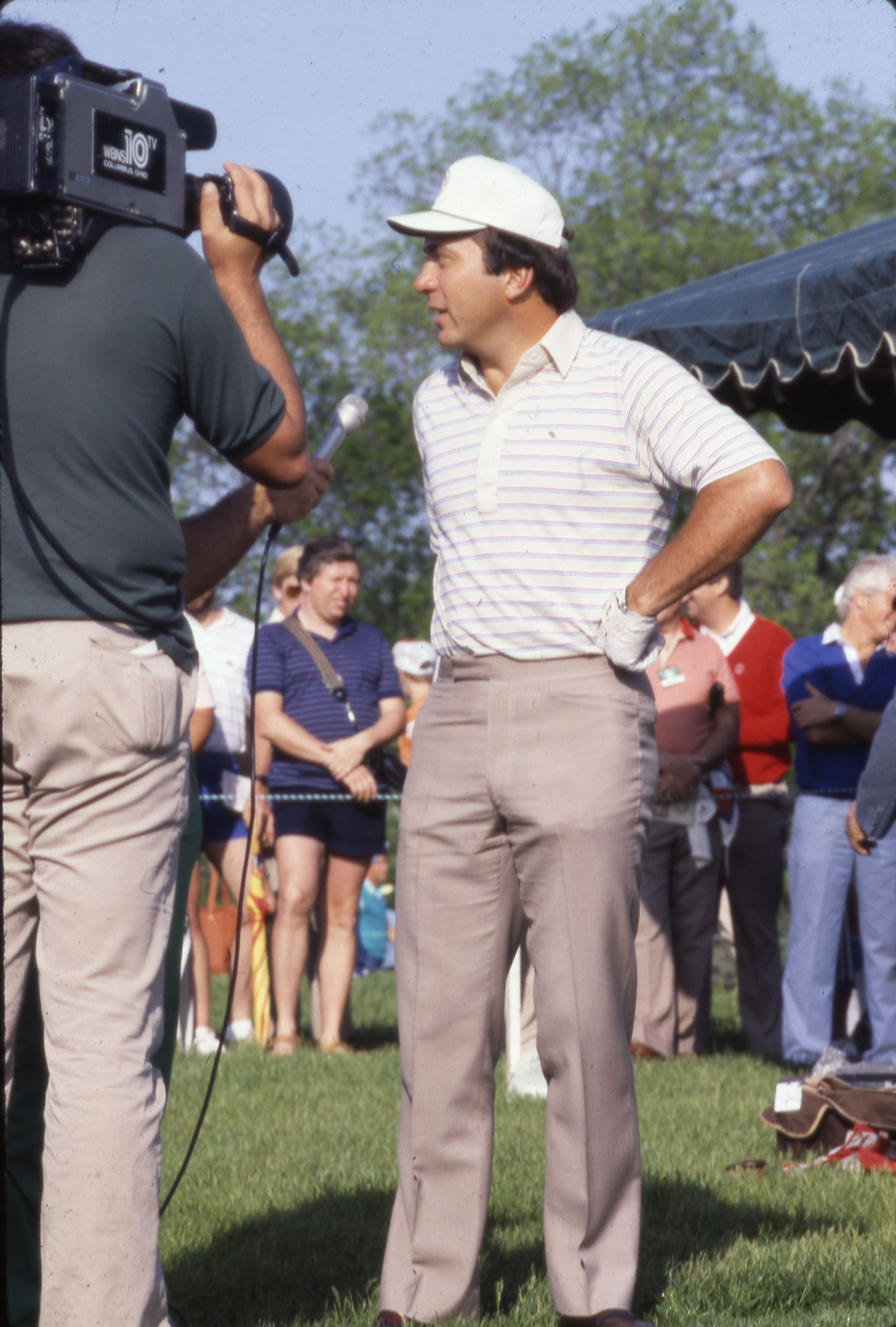
Johnny Bench, 1993 runner-up.

On Friday, July 9, 1993, in Round One of the fourth annual Isuzu Celebrity Golf Championship, Rhoden shot 66, with Hall of Fame catcher Johnny Bench and Larouche trailing by four. On Saturday, July 10, in Round Two, Rhoden lead after two rounds with 137 strokes, followed by Bench with 140 and Tennessee Oilers placekicker Al Del Greco with 141. On Sunday, July 11, in Round Three, Rhoden won the tournament again with 207 total strokes and finishing nine under par, both setting tournament records. He became the first player to win the event multiple times. This gave the US a tie with Canada in total tournament victories with two each. Bench finished in second place with 211 total and Del Greco finished in third place with 214 total.

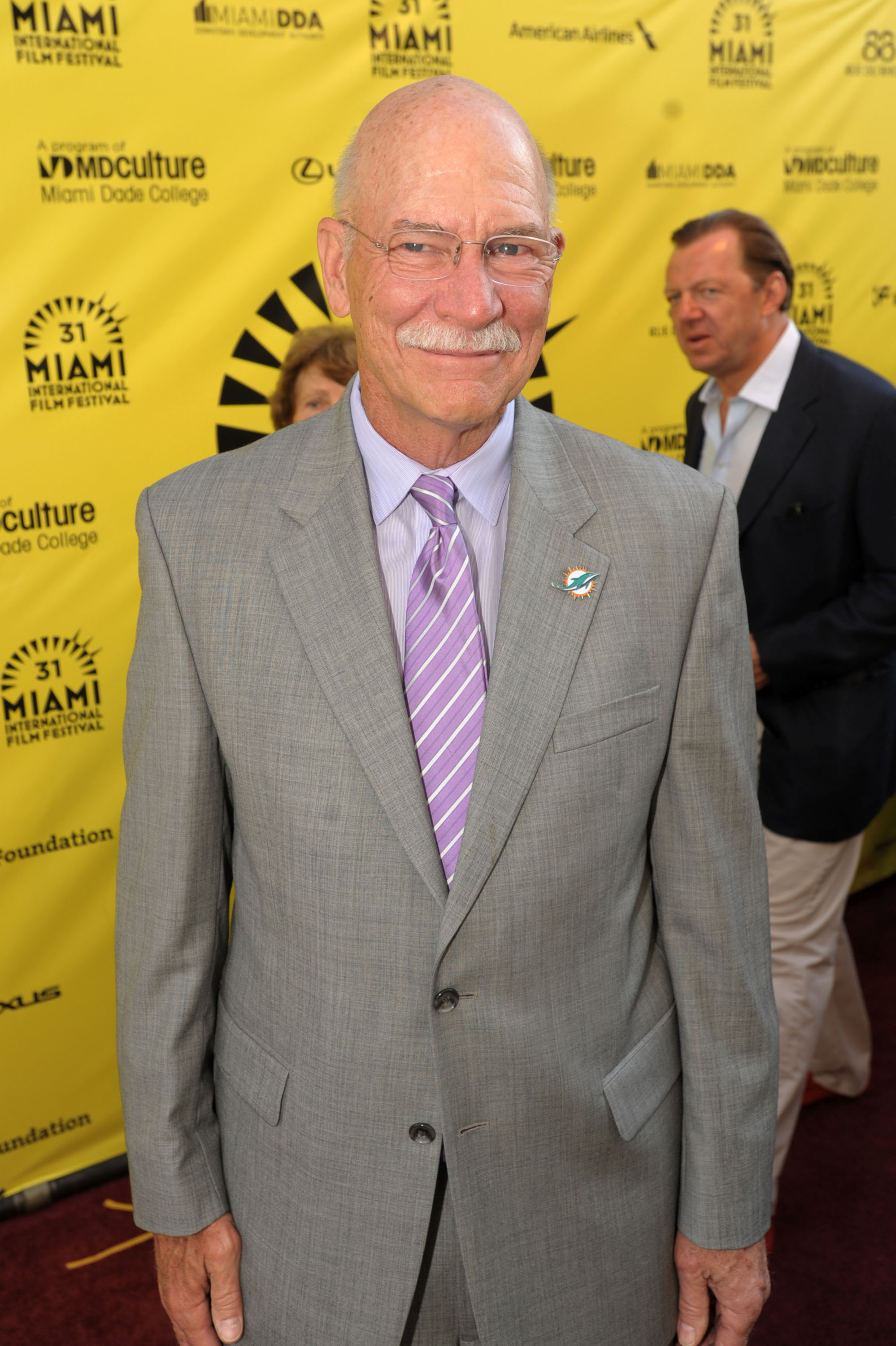
Dick Anderson, 1994 winner.

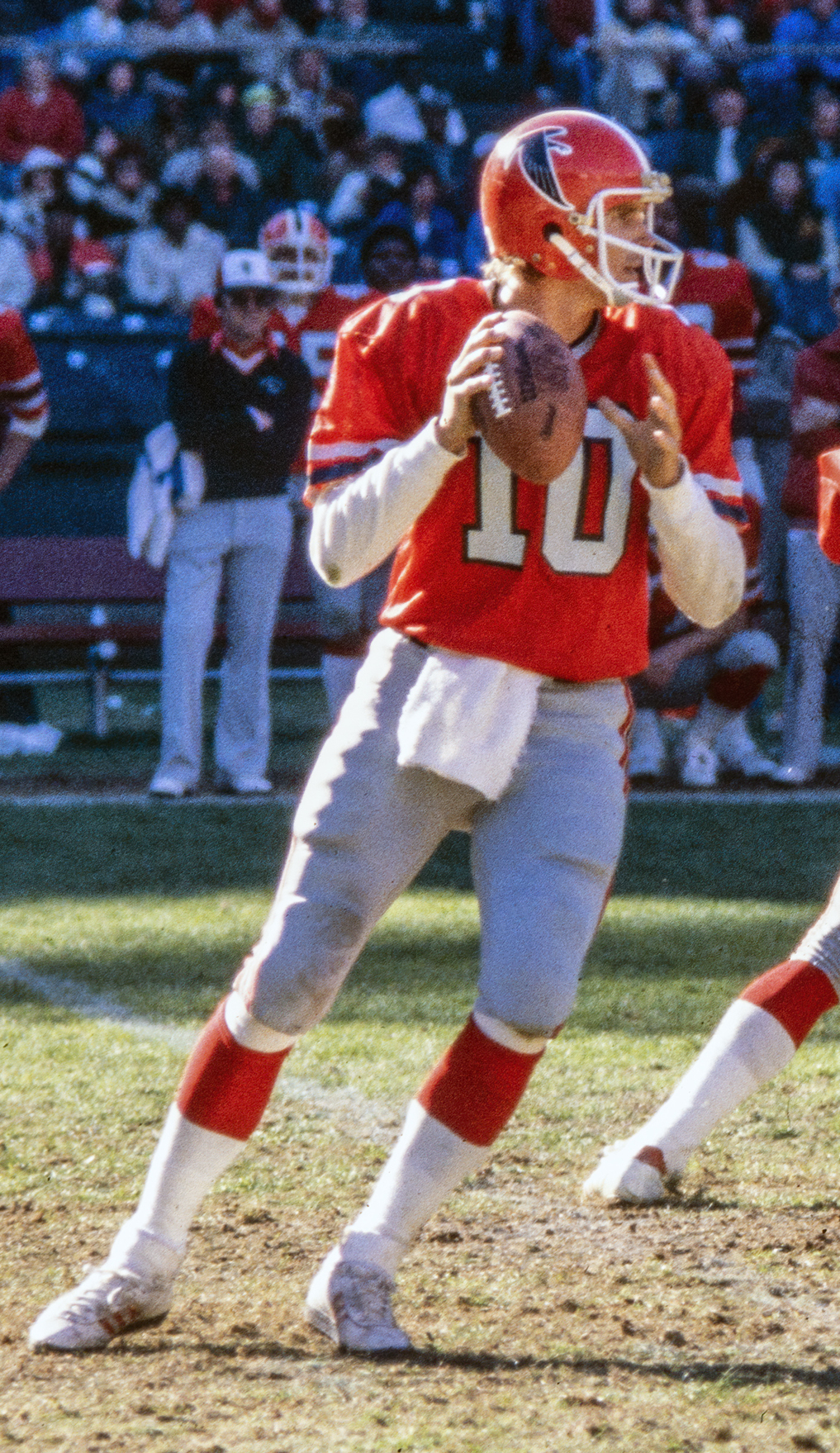
Steve Bartkowski, 1994 co-runner-up.

On Friday, July 8, 1994, in Round One of the fifth annual Isuzu Celebrity Golf Championship, Bartkowski, Laimbeer, and Chris Miller all shot 71, tying for the lead. Miller withdrew after Round One. On Saturday, July 9, in Round Two, former ice hockey player Darren Veitch lead after two rounds with 139 strokes, followed by Anderson and Bartkowski with 141 each. On Sunday, July 10, in Round Three, Anderson, Bartkowski, and Rhoden finished with 212 total strokes, going to the second sudden-death playoff in tournament history. Anderson won the event in the playoff, making him the first non-quarterback in football to win the event. This is the third time someone from America has win the event, giving the US the lead over Canada.

In Round One of the sixth annual Isuzu Celebrity Golf Championship on Friday in 1995, Rhoden and Del Greco both shot 71, followed by former NBA player Jack Marin, newly elected Hall of Fame third baseman Mike Schmidt, former NFL quarterback Neil Lomax, and Hall of Fame relief pitcher Rollie Fingers each trailing by one. After Round Two on Saturday, Rhoden was running away with it with 138 strokes, leading Marin and Del Greco by eight strokes. In Round Three on Sunday, Rhoden won the event with 211 total strokes. Former NFL quarterback Peter Tom Willis finished in second place five strokes behind and Anderson finished in third place with 217 total.

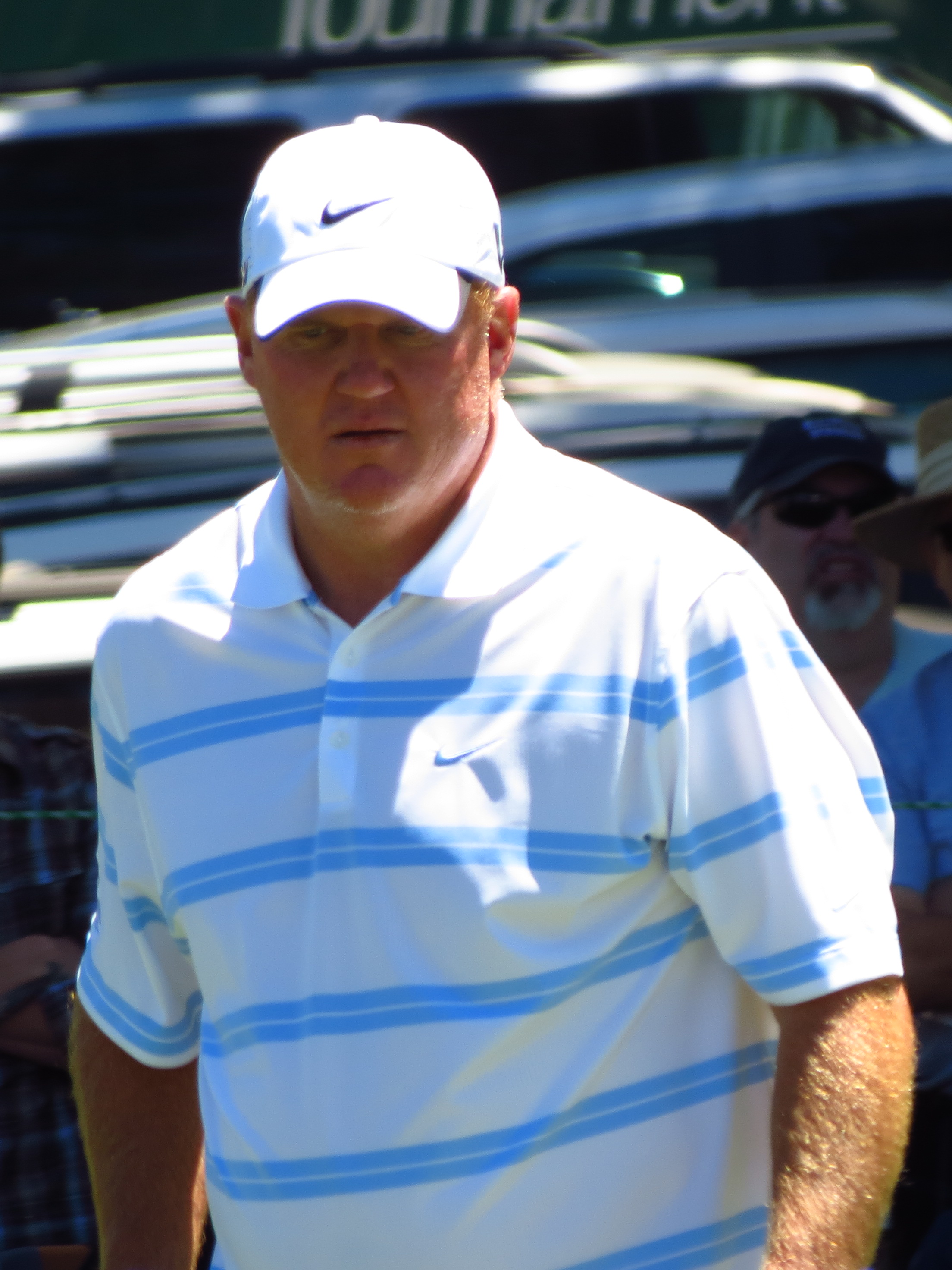
Billy Joe Tolliver, playing in the event in 2011, is a four-time ACC champion.

On Friday, June 12, 1996, in Round One of the seventh annual Isuzu Celebrity Golf Championship, Quinn shot 67 with Bench trailing two strokes behind. Atlanta Falcons quarterback Billy Joe Tolliver, Elway, Marin, and Stenerud all shot 70. On Saturday, July 13, in Round Two, Larouche and Dick Anderson tied for the lead with 141 strokes. Tolliver, former San Francisco 49ers quarterback John Brodie, and Elway were in a three-way tie for third with 143 each. On Sunday, June 14, in an exciting Round Three, Tolliver claimed the Isuzu with a four-stroke victory over his nearest competitor, former running back Donny Anderson. Brodie finished in third place with 216 total.

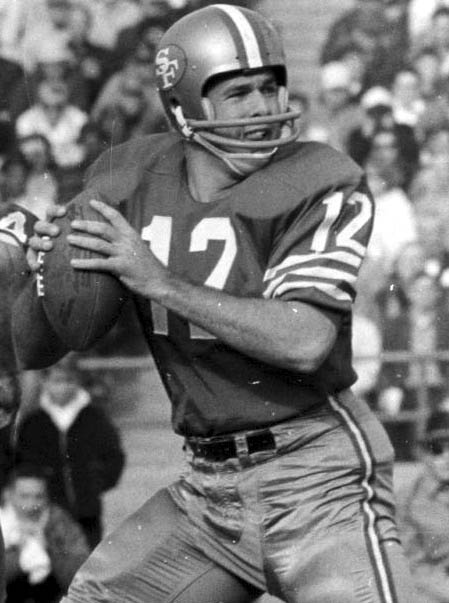
John Brodie, 1997 co-runner-up.

On Friday, July 4, 1997, in Round One of the eighth annual Isuzu Celebrity Golf Championship, Brodie shot 67 with Tampa Bay Buccaneers quarterback Trent Dilfer trailing by one and actor Rudy Gatlin trailing Dilfer by two. On Saturday, July 5, in Round Two, Rhoden lead after two rounds with 137 strokes, followed by Quinn and Brodie with 140 each. On Sunday, July 6, in Round Three, Rhoden won the Isuzu for the fourth time in the event's eight-year history, shooting a two-under 70 as he cruised to a three-shot win over his playing partners, Quinn and Brodie. Rhoden finished at nine-under 207, tying his three day tournament record and winning for his 16th time on the celebrity golf circuit.

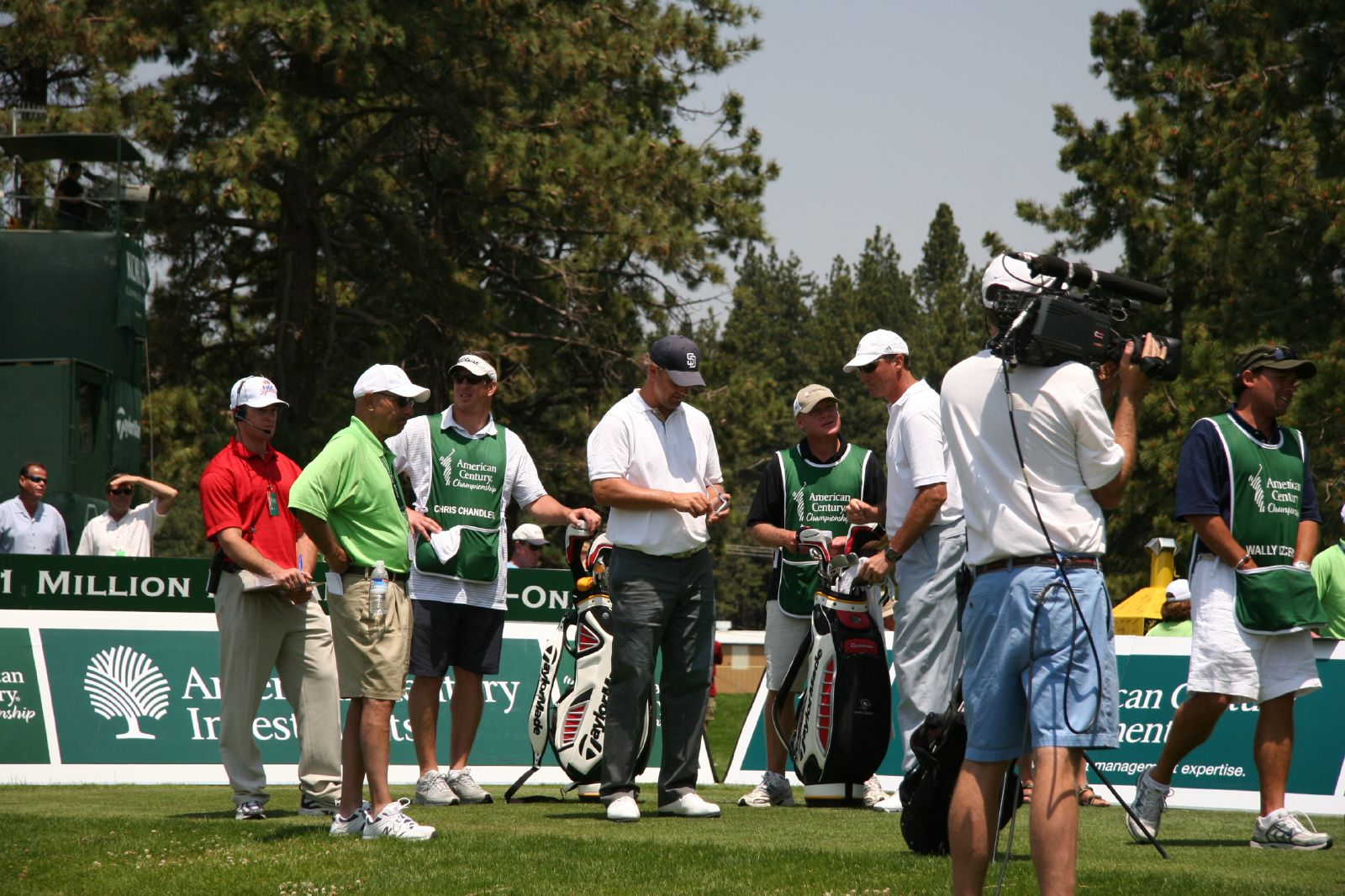
2007 winner Chris Chandler (left) and 1998 winner Mario Lemieux (right) in 2008.

On Friday, July 10, 1998, in Round One of the ninth annual Isuzu Celebrity Golf Championship, Dilfer shot 71, with Tolliver, Elway, Quinn, Del Greco, Bartkowski, and Stenerud all trailing by one. On Saturday, July 11, in Round Two, Tolliver lead after two rounds with 140 strokes, followed by retired hockey great Super Mario Lemieux, Rhoden, and Quinn each trailing by three strokes. On Sunday, July 12, in Round Three, Lemieux won the Isuzu, shooting a three-under 69 to finish with a total of 212 strokes. Tolliver and Dick Anderson tied for second place, both finishing one stroke behind.

On Friday, July 2, 1999, in Round One of the tenth annual American Century Celebrity Golf Championship, Rypien shot 70 with Rhoden and Elway both trailing by one. On Saturday, July 3, in Round Two, Rhoden lead after two rounds with 145 strokes, followed by Larouche trailing by one stroke and Rypien with 149. On Sunday, July 4, in Round Three, Rhoden won the ACCGC for the fifth time in the event's ten-year history, finishing with 212 total strokes. Quinn and Tolliver tied for second place with 221 total strokes. Rhoden earned $100,000 of the total $500,000 total ACCGC purse. Hampered by 50 miles per hour gusts of wind during rounds one and two, Rhoden still managed to win with the largest margin of victory in tournament history with a nine stroke lead, and remains the top money winner in Celebrity Golf.

=== 2000s ===
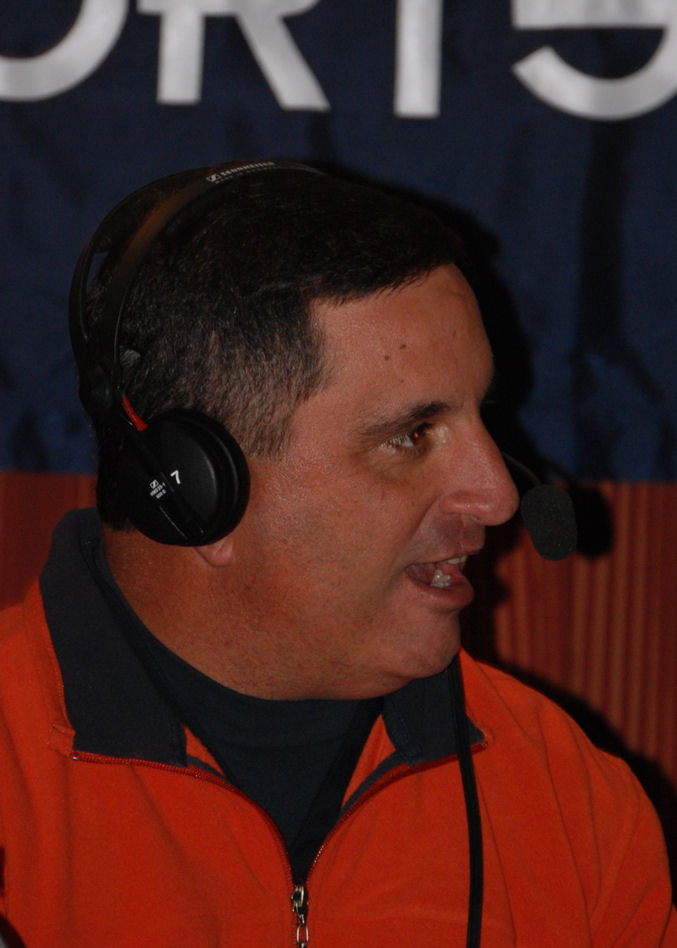
Al Del Greco, 2000 winner.

On Friday, July 7, 2000, in Round One of the 11th annual American Century Celebrity Golf Championship, Wagner shot 69 with Dilfer trailing by one and Rhoden trailing behind Dilfer by one. On Saturday, July 8, in Round Two, Anderson lead after two rounds with 142 strokes, followed closely behind by Rhoden trailing by one stroke and Dilfer and Bartkowski both trailing Rhoden by one. On Sunday, July 9, in Round Three, Del Greco’s seven under par 65 gave him the 2000 ACCGC. He finished the tournament with 210 total strokes. The 65 shot by Del Greco was the lowest score ever posted in this Celebrity Championship. He became the second football player after Dick Anderson as the only two non-quarterbacks to win the event. Anderson finished three strokes behind in second place and Brodie finished three strokes behind Anderson placing third.

On Friday, July 6, 2001, in Round One of the 12th annual American Century Celebrity Golf Championship, Rhoden shot 65, setting the record for the lowest score in round one and any other round in tournament history, with former Pittsburgh Penguins Center, the Mighty Dan Quinn, trailing by four strokes, and Wagner and Kinchen trailing the leader by five strokes. On Saturday, July 7, in Round Two, former Hockey Great Dan Quinn and Rhoden both lead after two rounds with 136 strokes, the fewest ever through the first two rounds in tournament history. They were followed closely behind by Wagner trailing by two strokes. On Sunday, July 8, in Round Three, Quinn won the ACCGC, ending the odd year streak of five-time tournament champion Rick Rhoden. Quinn finished with 207 total strokes, tying Rhoden's tournament record. Rhoden finished in second place with 210 total strokes and Wagner finished in third place with 214 total strokes.

On Friday, July 19, 2002, in Round One of the 13th annual American Century Celebrity Golf Championship, Quinn, Bartkowski, and Lomax all lead after shooting 71. On Saturday, July 20, in Round Two, Quinn and Rhoden both lead again after two rounds with 142 strokes, followed closely behind by Wagner, former tennis player Ivan Lendl, and Dick Anderson, all trailing by two strokes. On Sunday, July 21, in Round Three, Quinn won another ACCGC, this time in 213 strokes. Rhoden finished two strokes behind for second place and Tolliver finished three strokes behind for third place. Quinn took home another trophy and a winner’s check for $100,000, making him the first celebrity to win the tournament in consecutive years. He gave ten percent of his winnings to the NYC Firefighters Scholarship Fund following the September 11 attacks.

On Friday, July 18, 2003, in Round One of the 14th annual American Century Championship, Bartkowski shot 68 with Quinn and Del Greco both trailing by one stroke. On Saturday, July 19, in Round Two, Wagner lead after two rounds with 139 strokes, followed by Bartkowski trailing by one stroke and Rhoden trailing the leader by four strokes. On Sunday, July 20, in Round Three, after a three-year drought, Rhoden shot a final round of 66 to capture his sixth ACC title. Rhoden had 133 strokes in the last two rounds, setting the records for the fewest strokes in the last two rounds and any two consecutive rounds in tournament history. Wagner placed second and Quinn placed third.

On Friday, July 16, 2004, in Round One of the 15th annual American Century Championship, Quinn and Tolliver both scored 25 points each, with Rhoden and Lendl both trailing by two points each. On Saturday, July 17, in Round Two, Tolliver lead after two rounds with 47 points, followed by Quinn, Rhoden, and Rypien all trailing the leader by two points each. On Sunday, July 18, in Round Three, it came down to the final putt on the 18th hole to determine the winner. Rhoden had an eagle putt to capture his seventh title, but it was Quinn who tapped in for birdie and the $100,000 first place check. Quinn scored a total of 74 points and has now won three out of the last four Championships. Rhoden finished scoring one point behind the winner for second place and Rypien placed third after scoring 67 points.

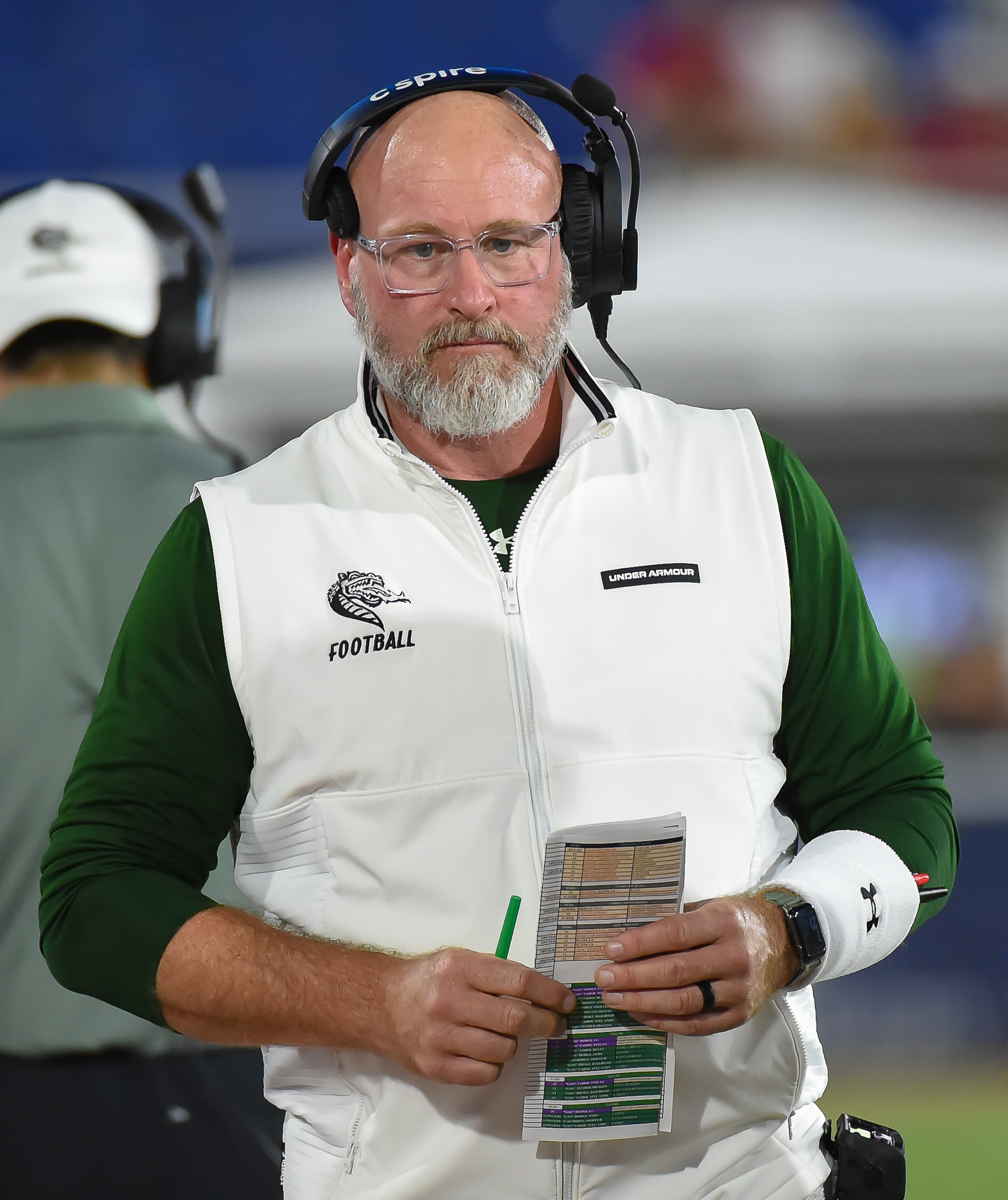
Trent Dilfer, 2005 runner-up.

On Friday, July 15, 2005, in Round One of the 16th annual American Century Championship, Rhoden scored 30 points, the most points ever scored in Round One in tournament history. To date, it is the only time 30 points were ever scored in Round One. Tolliver and Rypien were both trailing the leader by two points each. On Saturday, July 16, in Round Two, Tolliver again lead after two rounds with 56 points, followed by Rhoden with 54 points and former quarterback Chris Chandler with 51 points. On Sunday, July 17, in Round Three, simply put, when he puts his mind to it, Tolliver plays good golf. And this year, for him, it was mind over matter as he wins this three-day tournament of champions shooting a 28-28-20 (Stableford format) for a total of 76 points. In regular stroke play, this equates to a 69-69-73, or 211 strokes, for the three rounds. Although Dilfer matched Tolliver in the fewest total strokes, he placed second after scoring 72 total points and Rhoden finished in third place after scoring 71 total points in 212 strokes.

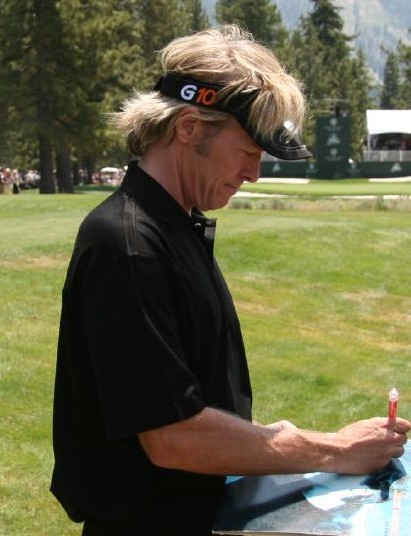
Jack Wagner, signing autographs on the 17th hole in 2008, is a two-time champion and the only non-professional athlete to win the event.

On Friday, July 14, 2006, in Round One of the 17th annual American Century Championship, Tolliver scored 27 points, with Quinn trailing the leader by one point and Wagner and Chandler scoring 23 points each. On Saturday, July 15, in Round Two, Tolliver lead for the third straight year after two rounds, this time with 51 points, followed by Quinn with 49 points and Wagner with 47 points. On Sunday, July 16, in Round Three, Wagner won the ACC by sinking a 14-foot putt for birdie on the final hole. Wagner finished with 70 total points, or 213 total strokes, becoming the first "non-professional athlete" to win this event and seemed very proud of that fact in his press conference. Tolliver finished one point behind in 216 total strokes for second place. Quinn had the same number of strokes as the winner, but he finished with 67 points for third place.

On Friday, July 13, 2007, in Round One of the 18th annual American Century Championship, Tolliver scored 26 points, with former ice hockey goaltender Grant Fuhr and Green Bay Packers wide receiver Sterling Sharpe both trailing the leader by one point each. On Saturday, July 14, in Round Two, Rhoden lead after two rounds with 51 points, followed by Fuhr with 48 points and Chandler and Rypien with 47 points each. On Sunday, July 15, in Round Three, Chandler fired a five under par of 67 scoring 31 points in the final round and 78 total points over the three day tournament in 213 strokes to capture the ACC title. Chandler set the single day and tournament records for overall points accumulated with his final round play. These records have since been broken. Although Rhoden and Fuhr finished the tournament with fewer strokes than Tolliver, with 210 and 212, respectively, they ended up scoring 73 and 70 points, respectively, to finish in second and third place.

On Friday, July 11, 2008, in Round One of the 19th annual American Century Championship, Jeremy Roenick scored 26 points, with Brett Hull trailing the leader by one point and Rhoden, Dallas Cowboys quarterback Tony Romo, Larouche, and Rypien all scoring 23 points each. On Saturday, July 12, in Round Two, Rhoden lead after two rounds with 45 points, followed by Romo with 43 points and Larouche with 41 points. On Sunday, July 13, in Round Three, Quinn scored 28 points and Rhoden scored 23 points. Although Quinn scored more in the final round, Rhoden edged out Quinn to secure his seventh ACC title by one point in the tournament. Fuhr and Romo finished tied for third place with 64 points each. Rhoden's steady play this weekend is why he has won more Celebrity Championships than anyone else.

On Friday, July 17, 2009, in Round One of the 20th annual American Century Championship, Romo scored 27 points, with Fuhr trailing Romo by three points and Dilfer one point back of Fuhr. On Saturday, July 18, in Round Two, Fuhr and Rhoden co-lead after two rounds with 56 points, followed by Romo and Quinn with 49 points each. On Sunday, July 19, in Round Three, with a total score of 74 points, Rhoden won his eighth ACC, even though he posted a two over par round with four bogies and only two birdies for the day. This is the first time Rhoden has won this tournament in consecutive years, making him the second celebrity to accomplish this feat. Romo finished three points back for second place and Tolliver and Quinn both finished one point behind Romo to tie for third place.

=== 2010s ===
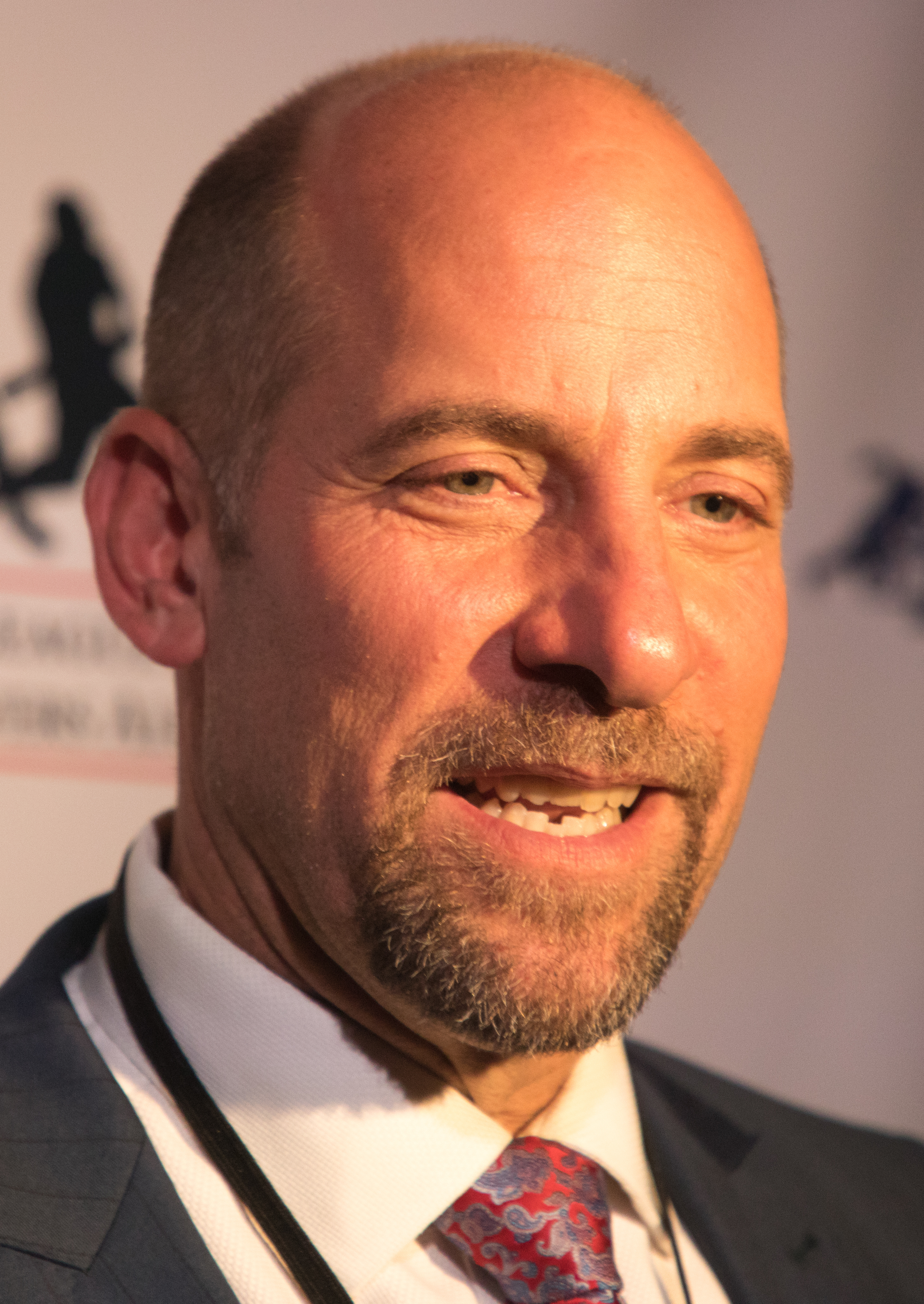
John Smoltz, three-time runner-up.

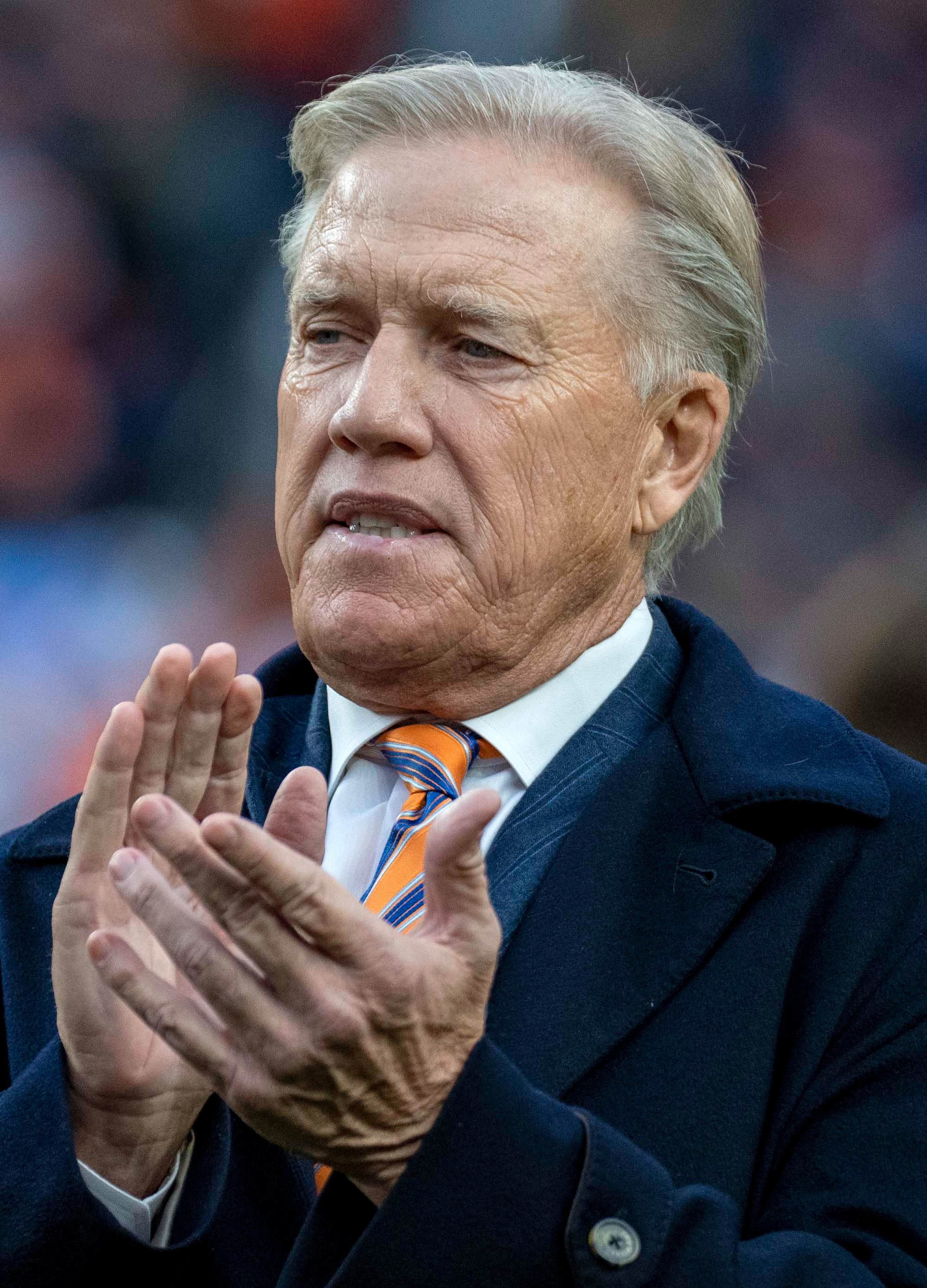
John Elway, 2010 runner-up, two-time Long Drive Challenge winner, and 2012 Hole-In-One Contest winner.

On Friday, July 16, 2010, in Round One of the 21st annual American Century Championship, Wagner and Roenick both scored 26 points each, with Tolliver trailing the leader by one point point back. On Saturday, July 17, in Round Two, Tolliver scored a then-record 31 points, leading after two rounds with 58 points, the most ever through the first two rounds in tournament history. He was followed behind by Wagner with 47 points and Quinn with 46 points. On Sunday, July 18, in Round Three, Tolliver was never challenged, scoring 26 points to claim his third title. Tolliver set the overall tournament scoring record by posting an impressive 84 total points, whilst winning the tournament by 19 points, the largest margin of victory. Tolliver scored 59 points in the last two rounds, the most ever through the last two rounds and any two consecutive rounds in tournament history. These are all tournament records. He finished 19 points ahead of Wagner, Elway, Romo, and former MLB pitcher John Smoltz, who were all in a four-way tie for second place with 65 points, setting the record for the most people tying for second place.

On Friday, July 15, 2011, in Round One of the 22nd annual American Century Championship, Wagner scored 29 points with Roenick and Chandler 5 points back of the leader. On Saturday, July 16, in Round Two, Wagner lead after two rounds with 52 points, followed by Romo with 46 points and Chandler with 42 points. The highlight of the tournament came on Sunday, July 17, in Round Three, when former ice hockey player Joe Sakic made a hole-in-one with an 8 Iron from 169 yards on the par three 17th hole for the fourth hole-in-one in tournament history. Romo scored 31 points and Wagner scored 28 points. Wagner birdied the par-three 17th hole and survived a bogey on the final hole for a three-point win over Romo at the ACC. Wagner outscored Romo, 80–77, to become the fourth multi-time winner in the event's 22-year history. Wagner's 80 points scored in a single tournament is the fourth most ever. Roenick and Chandler tied for third place scoring 66 points each.

On Friday, July 20, 2012, in Round One of the 23rd annual American Century Championship, former MLB pitcher Mark Mulder and Wagner both scored 22 points each, with Minnesota Vikings placekicker Ryan Longwell trailing the leader by one point back. On Saturday, July 21, in Round Two, Rypien lead after two rounds with 42 points, followed by Quinn with 40 points and Mulder with 38 points. On Sunday, July 22, in Round Three, Quinn birdied three of his first seven holes Sunday to pull ahead and then stretched his lead on the back nine to finish with 66 and earn a six-point victory over Rypien for his fifth ACC title, the second most ever. Elway finished in third place, one point behind Rypien.

On Friday, July 19, 2013, in Round One of the 24th annual American Century Championship, Rypien scored 27 points, with actor Lucas Black scoring 25 points and Chandler one point back of Black. On Saturday, July 20, in Round Two, Golden State Warriors point guard Stephen Curry lead after two rounds with 47 points, followed by Chandler and Roenick who were both trailing Curry by one point each. On Sunday, July 21, in Round Three, Tolliver and Rypien both finished with 67 points each, going to the third sudden-death playoff in tournament history. Mulder finished in third place scoring 66 points. Tolliver made par on the third playoff hole to edge Rypien to win his fourth championship, the third most ever.

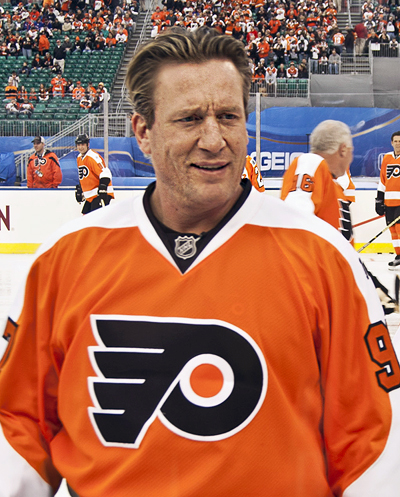
Jeremy Roenick, 2014 co-runner-up and two-time Long Drive Challenge winner.

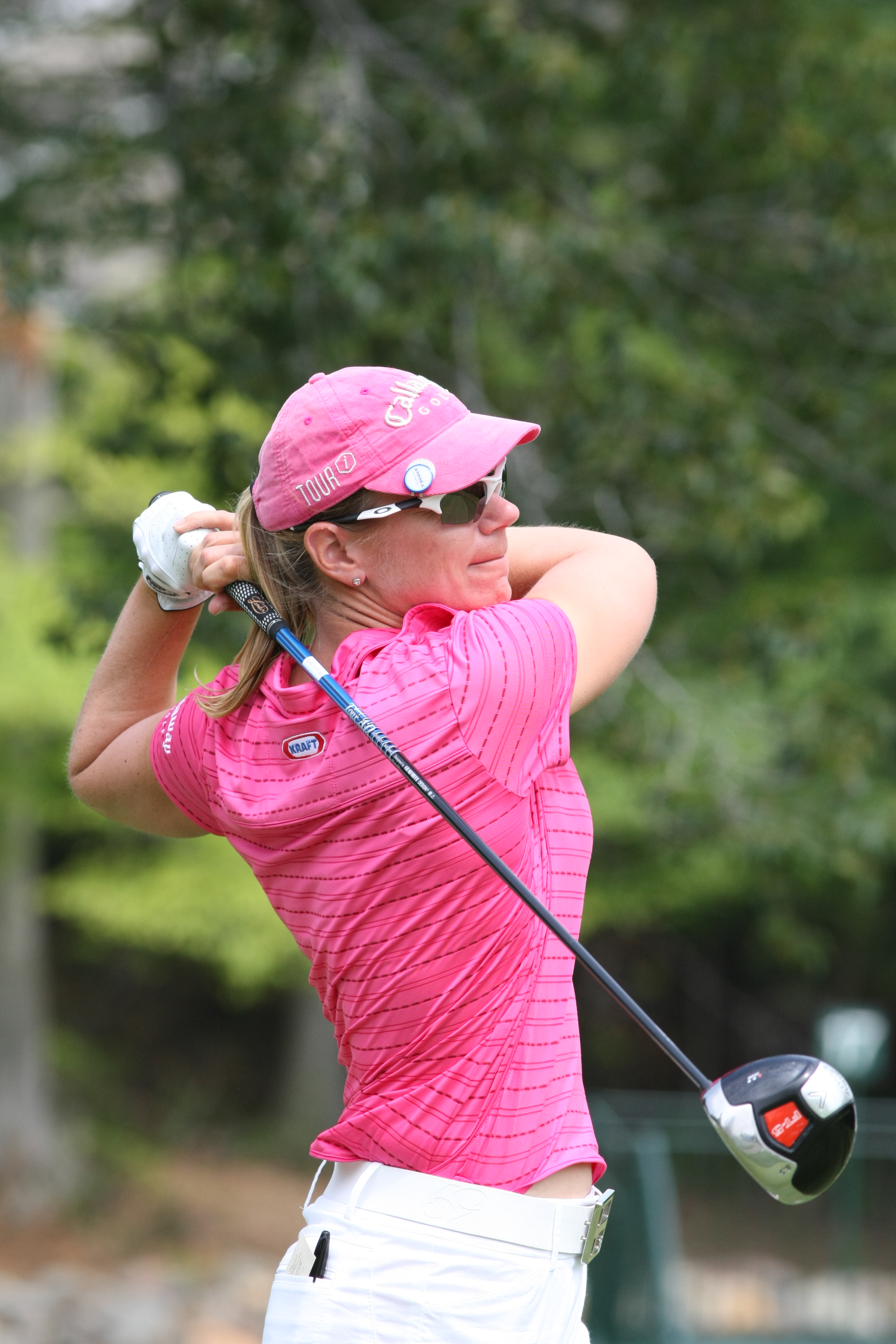
Annika Sörenstam, 2014 co-runner-up.

The 2014 American Century Championship featured United States Army veteran and amputee Chad Pfeifer, who had lost his left leg while on patrol in Iraq in 2007 to an improvised-explosive device. On Friday, July 18, 2014, in Round One of the 25th annual ACC, Pfeifer scored 24 points, with Roenick scoring 23 points and Rypien scoring 22 points. On Saturday, July 19, in Round Two, Roenick lead after two rounds with 48 points, followed by Pfeifer with 44 points and Rypien with 43 points. On Sunday, July 20, in Round Three, Rypien stayed the course through a three hour rain and lightning delay to score 76 total points to win the 25 Year Silver Anniversary of NBC Sports’ ACC. Rypien took two second-place finishes in the last two years in 2012 and 2013. Mark had also previously been the Super Bowl of Celebrity Sports tournament's first champion back in 1990, setting the record for largest gap between titles in tournament. Subsequently he scored 33 points in the final round, breaking the single day mark held by Chris Chandler (2007 Final Round) and Billy Joe Tolliver (2010 Second Round). Roenick and professional golfer Annika Sörenstam both finished tied for second place scoring 65 points each. By tying for second place, Sörenstam set the record for the best finish by a woman in the history of the tournament.

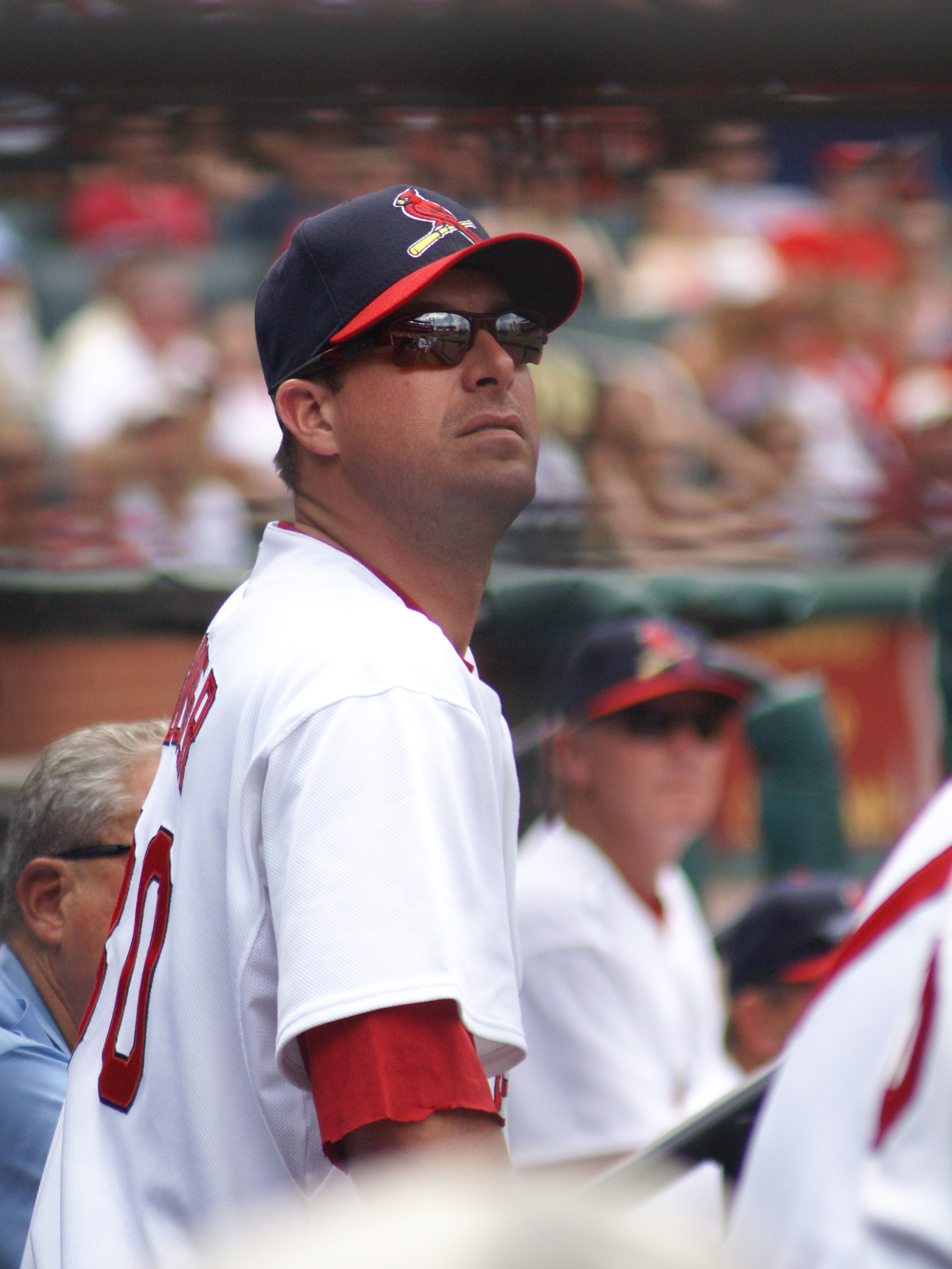
Mark Mulder is the only celebrity to have won the tournament three times consecutively.

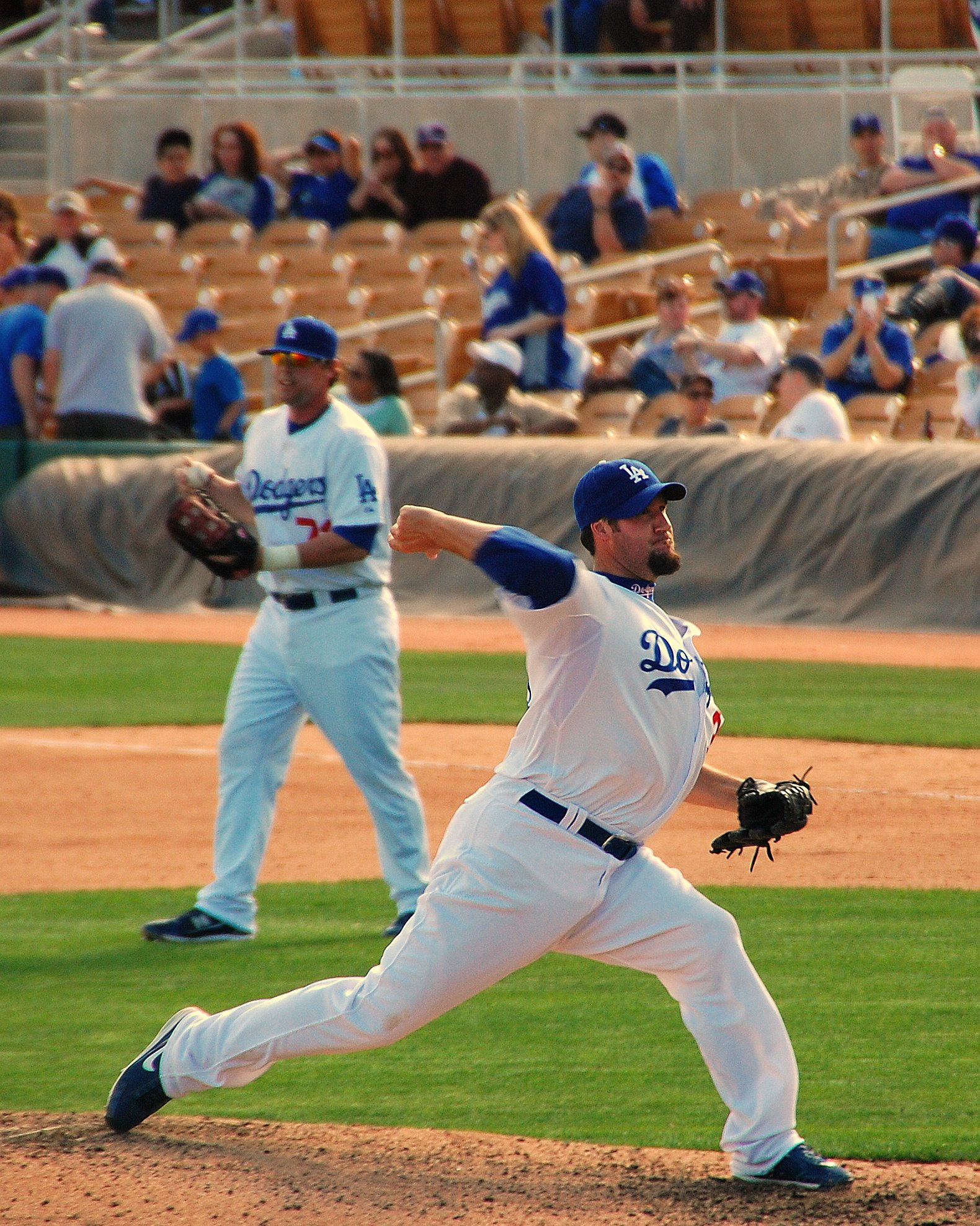
Éric Gagné, 2015 runner-up.

On Friday, July 17, 2015, in Round One of the 26th annual American Century Championship, Mulder and Wagner both scored 26 points each, with Tolliver trailing the leader by one point back. On Saturday, July 18, in Round Two, Josh Scobee tied Mark Rypien's single day scoring record with 33, which was set one year earlier. This put him at 57 points through two rounds of play, with Mulder trailing the leader by five points and former MLB pitcher Éric Gagné sitting one point behind Mulder. On Sunday, July 19, in Round Three, and after three straight top ten finishes, Mulder finally broke through. Coming into the final round, Mulder trailed the leader by five strokes, but he rode seven birdies to rack up 30 points on Sunday and 82 total points, all the way to his first ACC victory. Mulder became both the second baseball player and pitcher to win the tournament other than Rhoden. Despite scoring 30 points on Sunday and 59 points in the last two rounds, which tied Tolliver's records set back in 2010, Gagné finished only one point back in the tournament to place second. Mulder and Gagné's 82 and 81 total points are the second and third most points ever scored in a single tournament, respectively. Gagné's 81 points are a record for someone who never won that or any tournament event. Scobee scored 79 points, the fifth most ever, to finish in third place.

On Friday, July 22, 2016, in Round One of the 27th annual American Century Championship, Wagner scored 27 points, with former ice hockey player Mike Modano scoring 24 points and Mulder trailing Modano by one point back. On Saturday, July 23, in Round Two, former ATP tennis player Mardy Fish lead after two rounds scoring 50 points, with Wagner trailing the leader by two. Mulder and Modano found themselves both trailing the leader by five points. On Sunday, July 24, in Round Three, and just like last year, Mulder came into the last round five strokes behind the leader and used a strong round on Sunday to win back-to-back ACCs. Mulder came out firing with seven birdies on his first 13 holes to take the lead. Regardless, he had to sweat it out until the end as Fish missed a 12-foot putt for eagle on the final hole that would have send the tournament to a playoff. Mulder won scoring 74 total points and Fish finished in second place after scoring 69 total points. Mulder is the third celebrity to win the tournament in consecutive years. Wagner placed third after scoring 67 total points.

On Friday, July 14, 2017, in Round One of the 28th annual American Century Championship, former MLB pitcher Derek Lowe scored 25 points, with Fish trailing one point behind the leader and San Jose Sharks center and right wing Joe Pavelski trailing only one point behind Fish. On Saturday, July 15, in Round Two, Mulder lead after two rounds with 48 points, followed by Fish and Lowe both scoring 45 points each. On Sunday, July 16, at the conclusion of Round Three, a three-peat! After a slow start on Friday, Mulder uses a big round two of 26 points to take the lead into the final round. He won with 73 total points, holding off the field including Fish, a charging Stephen Curry and the returning Tony Romo. Fish and Lowe both tied for second place scoring 62 points each.

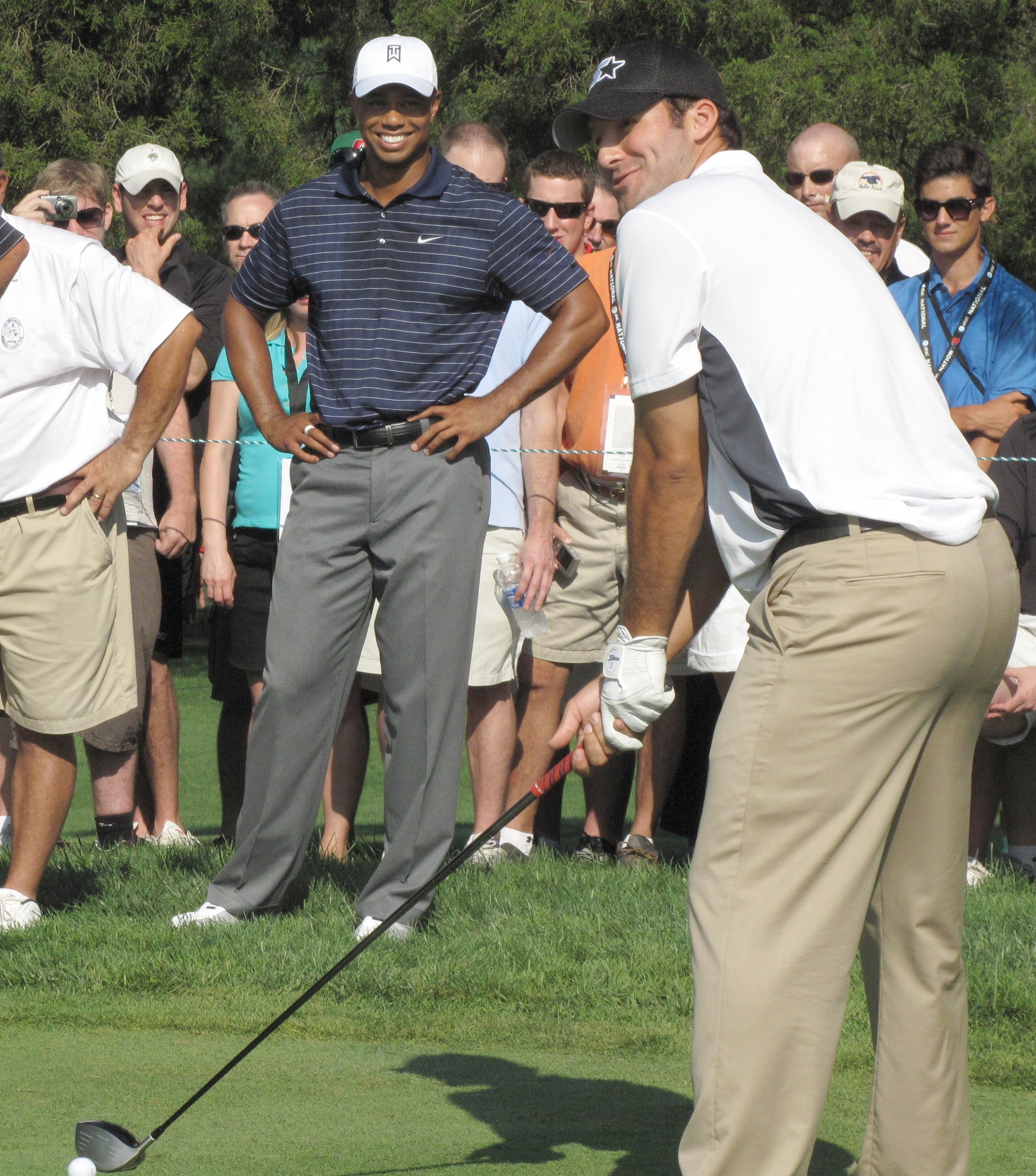
Tony Romo won back-to-back ACCs in 2018 and 2019 and won his third in 2022.

On Friday, July 13, 2018, in Round One of the 29th annual American Century Championship, Pavelski scored 25 points, with Dilfer trailing one point behind the leader and Rypien and Smoltz trailing three points behind Dilfer. On Saturday, July 14, in Round Two, Pavelski lead after two rounds with 48 points, followed by Mulder trailing Pavelski by only one point back and Romo scoring 44 points. On Sunday, July 15, in Round Three, Romo scores 27 points on the final day by shooting a four-under 68 to take the title home after starting the day in third place. He finished with 71 total points, three ahead of Mulder. Mulder, who scored 31 points in the second round, finished with 68 total points. Pavelski and former NBA shooting guard Ray Allen both tied for third place scoring 66 points each. Pavelski made it tough on him throughout the day and Allen finished with a career-best finish tied for third place.

On Friday, July 12, 2019, in Round One of the 30th annual American Century Championship, Romo scored 26 points, with Arizona Cardinals cornerback Patrick Peterson trailing two points behind the leader and Lowe trailing one point behind Peterson. On Saturday, July 13, in Round Two, Romo lead after two rounds with 51 points, followed by Fish and Lowe both scoring 42 points each. On Sunday, July 14, in Round Three, the defending champion lead wire-to-wire, scoring 71 total points, to cruise to a ten-point victory. The former quarterback became the fourth celebrity to repeat as tournament champion and held off three-time champion Mulder and perennial challengers Fish and Lowe who both finish tied for third place after scoring 57 points. Washington Redskins quarterback Case Keenum, Stephen Curry and Minnesota Vikings wide receiver Adam Thielen all finish in the top ten leading the way for active players.

=== 2020s ===
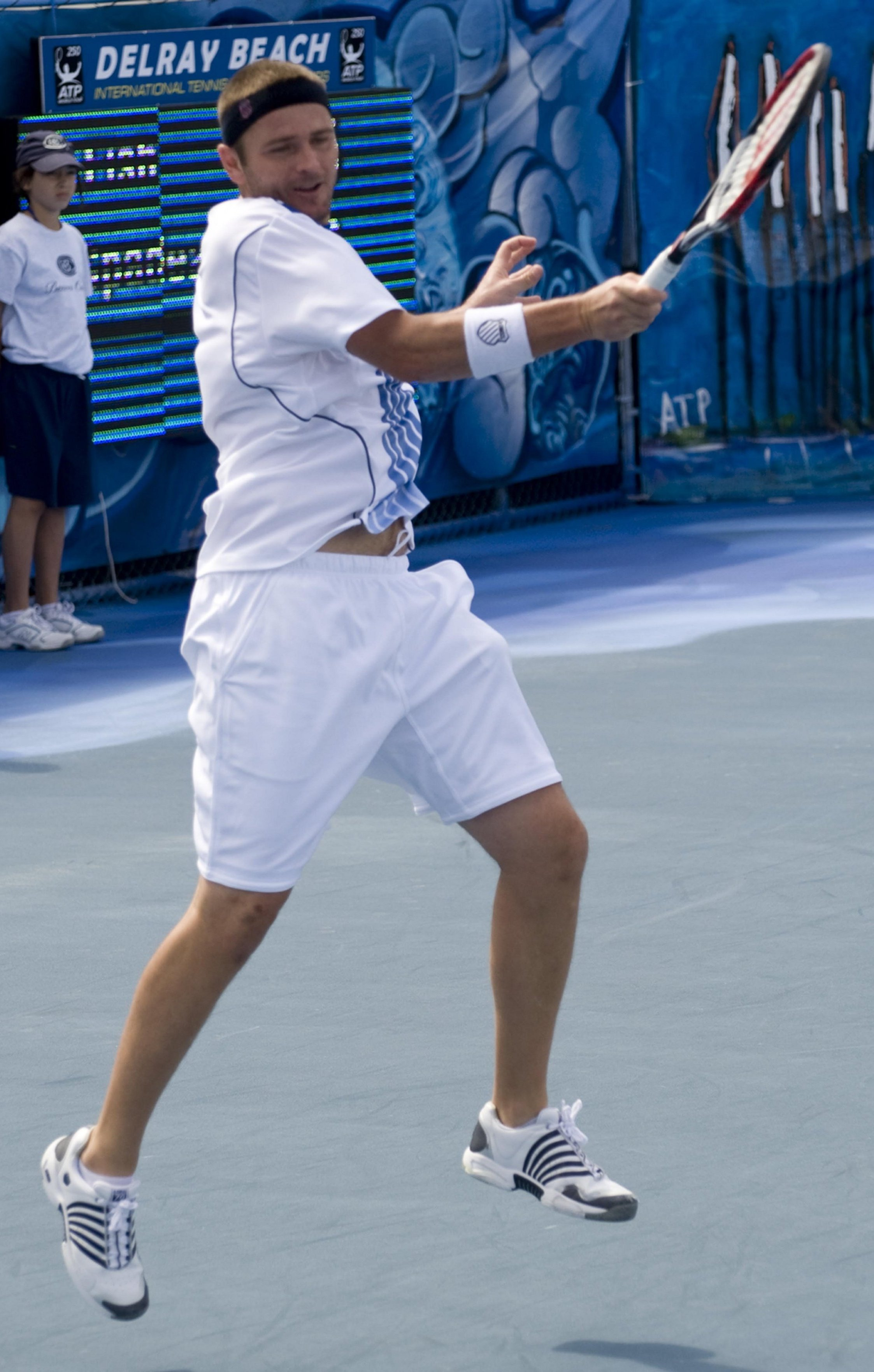
Mardy Fish has won the tournament championship three times in 2020, 2024, and 2026.

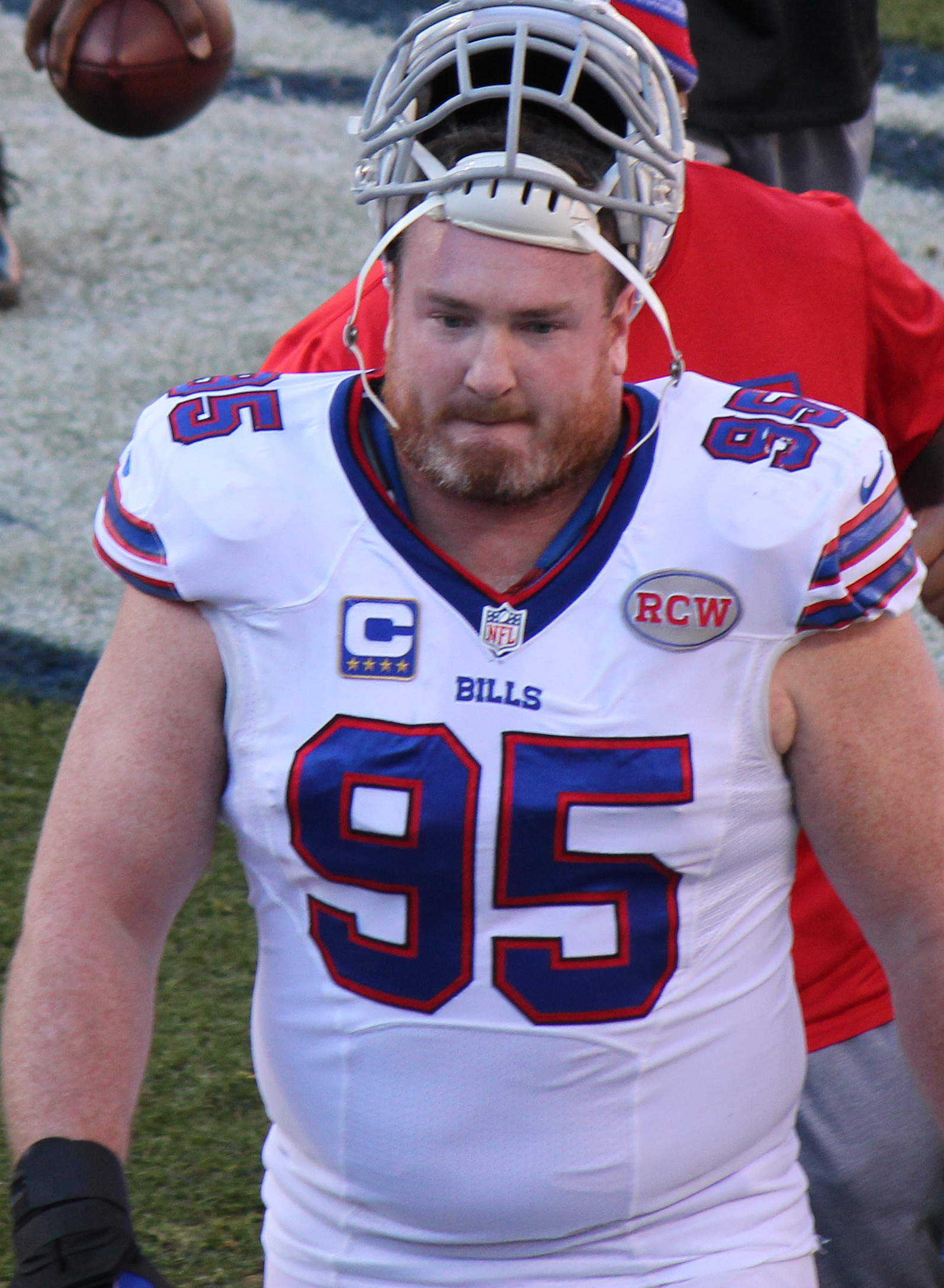
Kyle Williams, 2020 runner-up.

On June 4, 2020, it was announced that fans would not be allowed on the course due to the COVID-19 pandemic. On Friday, July 10, in Round One of the 31st annual American Century Championship, former Buffalo Bills defensive tackle Kyle Williams held the first round lead after scoring 25 points, followed by Smoltz who was five points back. Fish, Wagner, and Palmer all scored 18 points each. On Saturday, July 11, Round Two was highlighted by Mardy Fish's historic round as he set the single round modified Stableford scoring system record with 37 points, breaking the previous mark held by Mark Rypien and Josh Scobee whilst also posting a 63 in total strokes. He started his second round with a bogey on the first hole, but would then make ten birdies on his round, including birdying the final five holes, jumping him into the lead and giving him a three-point lead over Williams. Smoltz was 18 points behind Fish. Despite playing from the front tees, this broke the competitive course record of 64 at Edgewood Tahoe Resort, which was set in 1984 by World Golf Hall of Famer Lee Trevino. On Sunday, July 12, before Round Three, two-time defending champion Tony Romo was forced to withdraw after sustaining a wrist injury, ending Romo's quest for a three-peat. Fish would not relinquish his 36-hole lead as he went on to win the tournament scoring 76 total points. Williams finished in second place nine points behind Fish. John Smoltz's consistency found him in third place after scoring 58 total points and Curry rallied on Sunday to score 26 points and finish fourth after scoring a combined 56 total points.

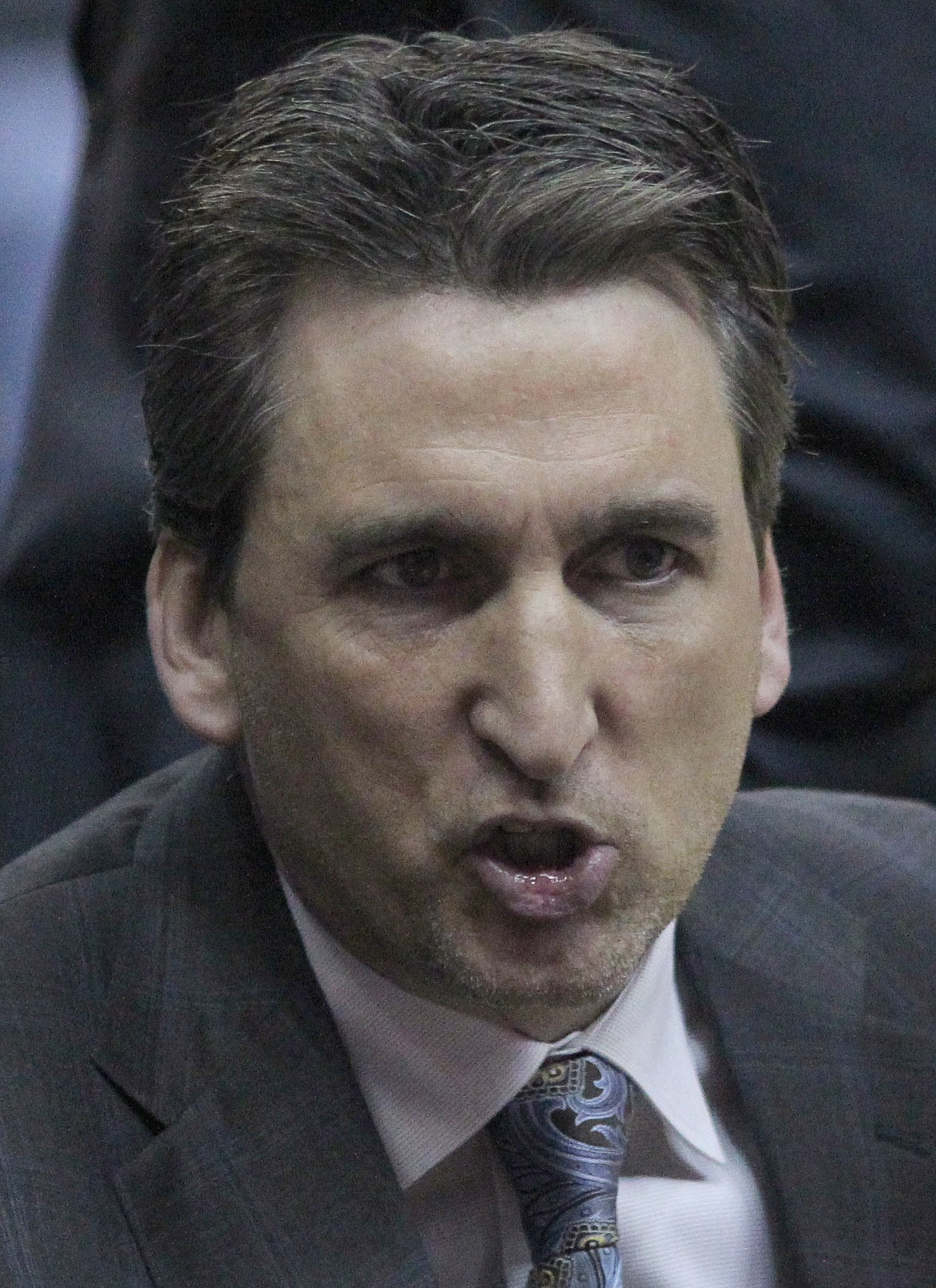
Vinny Del Negro, 2021 winner.

On Friday, July 9, 2021, in Round One of the 32nd annual American Century Championship, Modano holed out from 205 yards on the 18th hole for a double eagle, marking the first in tournament history. The double eagle was debatable because his wife Allison Micheletti was behind him but moved to the right right before Modano attempted and hit his second shot, which under the rules of golf, if caught, would have penalized him by two strokes and given him a birdie instead. Under Rule 10.2b(4), when a player begins taking a stance for the stroke and until the stroke is made, the player's caddie must not deliberately stand in a location on or close to an extension of the line of play behind the ball for any reason. Had Modano been made aware of the breach before he signed his scorecard, the two strokes would have needed to have been added. If he was unaware about the penalty and signed his scorecard, the penalty could still be added after the scorecard was returned and before the tournament was over. A disqualification penalty would only be incurred if he had known about the penalty before returning his scorecard and had failed to add this to his score. Nevertheless, this gave him ten points and jumped him into a tie for first place with Smoltz with 25 points scored each. Wagner and Dallas Stars center and right wing Joe Pavelski both trailed by only one point each. On Saturday, July 10, in Round Two, Smoltz lead after two rounds racking up 51 points, with former NBA player and coach Vinny Del Negro trailing by two points back and Wagner four points back of the leader. On Sunday, July 11, in Round Three, Del Negro had an eagle putt for the win on the 18th hole but left it a little short and settled for birdie. Smoltz made his par putt for one point to give him 69 total points, forcing a sudden-death playoff, the fourth in tournament history, between him and Del Negro. Romo scored 66 total points to finish in third place. In the sudden-death playoff, Smoltz hit his drive to the right, hit his next shot into a tree branch, and proceeded to go for the hole on his third shot, but it ended up splashing into "Lake Laimbeer". Another birdie on the 18th hole gave an emotional Del Negro the win as he dedicated the win to his late father who had died on Wednesday. He became the first person in basketball to win the tournament.

On Friday, July 8, 2022, in Round One of the 33rd annual American Century Championship, Washington Capitals right winger T. J. Oshie scored 21 points, with Mulder and Sörenstam both trailing by a single point back. On Saturday, July 9, in Round Two, Mulder takes a decent lead with 45 total points heading into the final round, but was ultimately unable to seal the deal. Fish trailed by three points behind Mulder and Thielen and Lowe both scored 38 total points each. On Sunday, July 10, in Round Three, Romo and Pavelski score 25 and 27 points respectively to force a three-way sudden-death playoff with Mulder, as they all finish with 62 points each. 62 total points accumulated through three rounds of play is the lowest ever by the leaders under this format. This was the fifth playoff in tournament history and the first playoff to happen in consecutive years. On the second playoff hole, Mulder and Pavelski both hit a tree on their drives and Romo capitalizes with a birdie to win his third ACC Championship in five years. Over 67,000 spectators attended that summer, setting a tournament record.

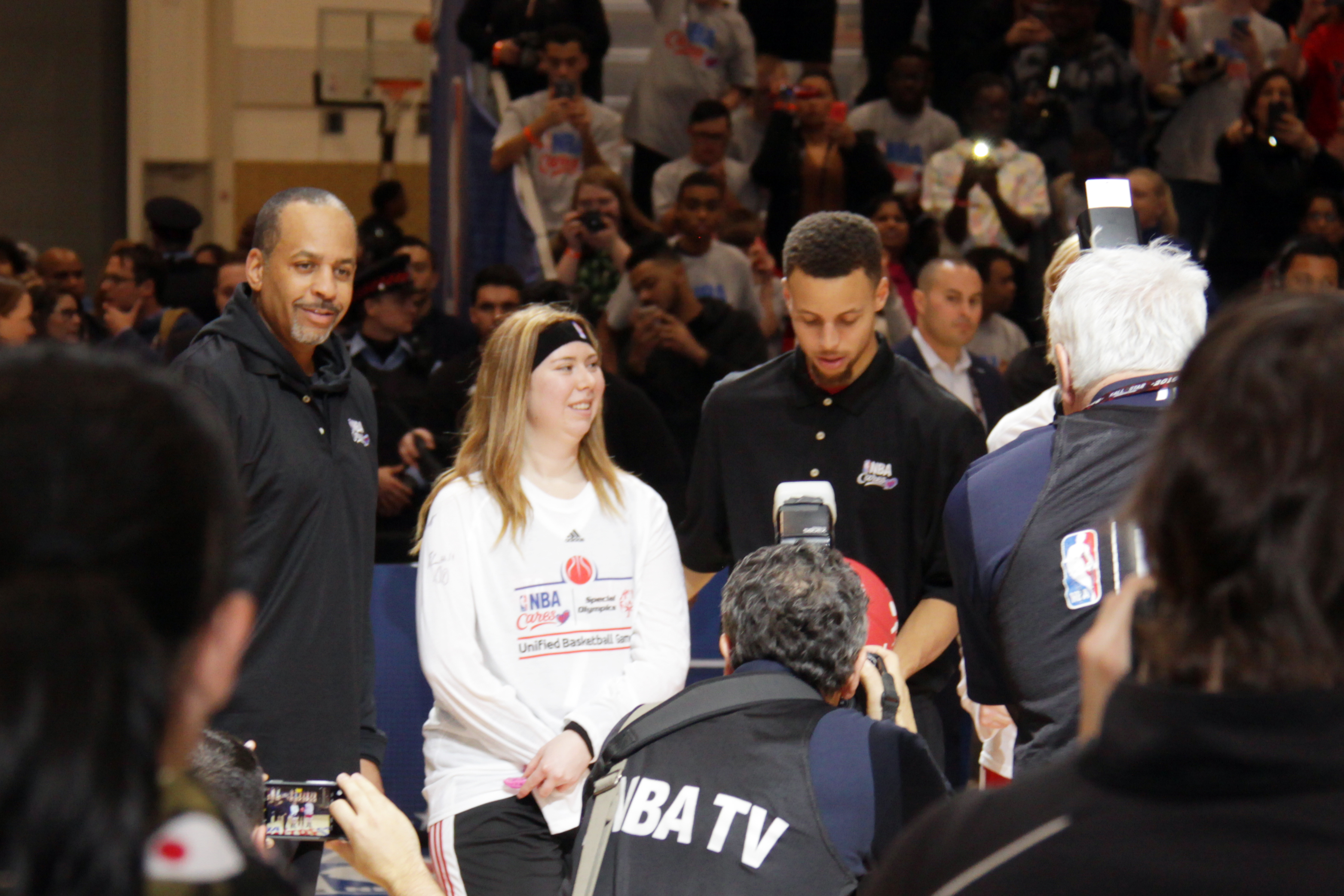
Dell Curry (left) with son and 2023 winner Stephen Curry (right) in 2016.

On Friday, July 14, 2023, before Round One of the 34th annual American Century Championship, as Curry was being introduced on the first tee, the opening tee box announcer named some of his biggest accomplishments and mentioned "...but he still hasn't won the big one... The American Century Championship." That would change by the end of the weekend. After a quick start on Friday, Curry ended the first round with the lead, having scored 27 points. Pavelski trailed by four points back and Anaheim Ducks left wing Alex Killorn trailed Pavelski by two. Curry topped his performance on Saturday, July 15, in Round Two, with a hole-in-one on the seventh hole from 165 yards. This was the first time someone made a hole-in-one on the seventh hole and the fifth in tournament history, as well as Curry's second hole-in-one. He finished the day in the lead once more with 50 points so far. Fish and Pavelski both trailed by three points each. On Sunday, July 16, Fish tied Curry coming off of the front nine in Round Three, which was a classic shootout. Fish claimed the lead and held it for most of the back nine. Fish held a three-point lead over Curry going into the 18th and final hole. The tournament finish was controversial because a fan interrupted the outcome. As Fish approached the tee box, a heckler yelled at him "Hey, Fish, f––– you, you suck!" The heckler then screamed bird noises right in his backswing as Fish hooked it to the right in the trees. The fan tried to scurry away and was tracked down by Curry and Fish's caddies as well as Stephen's father, Dell Curry, who regularly plays in the tournaments with his sons and was previously Stephen's caddie in the past. It was later revealed that the fan had money on Curry to win the tournament. Fish had to settle for par. Curry won the tournament by making an essential clutch eagle for a walk-off win. Had he missed the putt, he would have lost. He finished the event with 75 points, two more points than Fish and nine more points than Pavelski. He became the first active player to win the event since Del Greco in 2000 (fifth total), the second in basketball to win it, and the first African-American to win the event. A record 76,810 fans came out to watch.

On Thursday, April 18, 2024, it was rumored that Stephen Curry would not be able to play if he were to participate as a member of the United States men's national basketball team at the 2024 Summer Olympics in Paris, France. On Tuesday, May 7, 2024, it was confirmed. A regular staple, this is the first time Curry will miss the event since 2012 and will make him the first reigning champion in tournament history not to defend the title. On Friday, July 12, 2024, in Round One of the 35th annual American Century Championship, Carolina Panthers wide receiver Adam Thielen scored 24 points with Fish trailing by only one point. Lowe and Pavelski both scored 21 points, respectively. The shot of the day came on the par-three 12th hole, when NFL and College Football Hall of Fame wide receiver Tim Brown made a hole-in-one from 143 yards, the sixth hole-in-one in tournament history and the first ever occurrence on that particular hole. NFL and College Football Hall of Fame running back, fellow Heisman Trophy winner, and former Raider teammate Marcus Allen then made him realize that he had won a 2024 MasterCraft X24 boat collaborated with TravisMathew worth $225,000.00 after he had told him. On Saturday, July 13, in Round Two, Fish moved into the lead after two rounds with 57 total points, with Pavelski trailing by seven points back and Thielen 12 points back of the leader. Fish scored 34 points on the day, giving him possession of the top two single round modified Stableford scoring system point totals. On Sunday, July 14, in Round Three, despite Pavelski making a charge, Fish would again not relinquish his 36-hole lead, as he went on to win the tournament, making him the eighth multi-time winner in tournament history. Fish scored 83 total points, the second most ever in tournament history, and scored 60 points in Rounds Two and Three, the most ever for Rounds Two and Three and the most for any two consecutive rounds. Pavelski finished in second place with 79 total points and Sörenstam finished in third place with 68 total points. This summer set a new attendance record of 77,049 fans. On Saturday, August 10, 2024 at Accor Arena, in the Olympic Final, a 98–87 win over the France men's national basketball team, the 2024 United States men's Olympic basketball team won the Olympic gold medal.

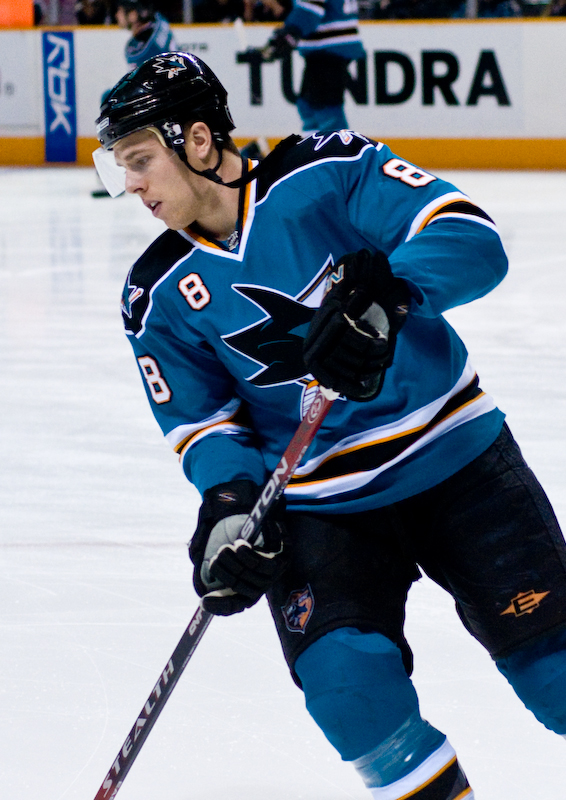
Joe Pavelski, 2025 winner.

On Friday, July 11, 2025, in Round One of the 36th annual American Century Championship, Pavelski scored 23 points with Del Negro trailing by only one point. Former soccer player Taylor Twellman and Stephen Curry both scored 21 points, respectively. On Saturday, July 12, in Round Two, Pavelski tied Twellman for the co-lead after two rounds with 44 total points, with country music singer Jake Owen trailing by three points. The shot of the day on Day Two came on the par-three 12th hole, when former MLB player Jimmy Rollins made a hole-in-one from 139 yards, the seventh hole-in-one in tournament history and the second ever (consecutive) occurrence on that particular hole. This is the third straight year with an ace at the tournament. He won a 2024 MasterCraft X24 boat collaborated with TravisMathew worth at least $325,000.00. On Sunday, July 14, in Round Three, Pavelski won the tournament with a dramatic walk-off eagle on the eighteenth and final hole. He scored 29 points that day to finish with 73 total points. He celebrated his birthday on Friday, his wedding anniversary on Saturday, and celebrated his win very similar to Curry's two years ago. Pavelski became the seventh NHL hockey player overall and the first U.S. born NHL hockey player to win the tournament. Smoltz finished in second place with 64 total points and Owen finished in third place with 62 total points.

On Friday, July 10, 2026, in Round One of the 37th annual American Century Championship, the defending champion Pavelski scored 29 points. This was his second consecutive round scoring 29 points dating back to last year's Final Round. Fish and Stephen Curry scored 27 and 25 points. On Saturday, July 11, in Round Two, Fish made a gutsy eagle on 18 to take the lead, finishing with 52 points. Pavelski was four points back with 48 points and Sörenstam finished with 47 points. On Sunday, July 12, in Round Three, Fish won the tournament with a conservative and safe par on the eighteenth and final hole, finishing with 72 total points scored. Previous champions Pavelski and Curry finished with 66 and 59 total points scored, respectively. Fish's third title in the last seven years made him the sixth in tournament history to win at least three.

== Traditions ==
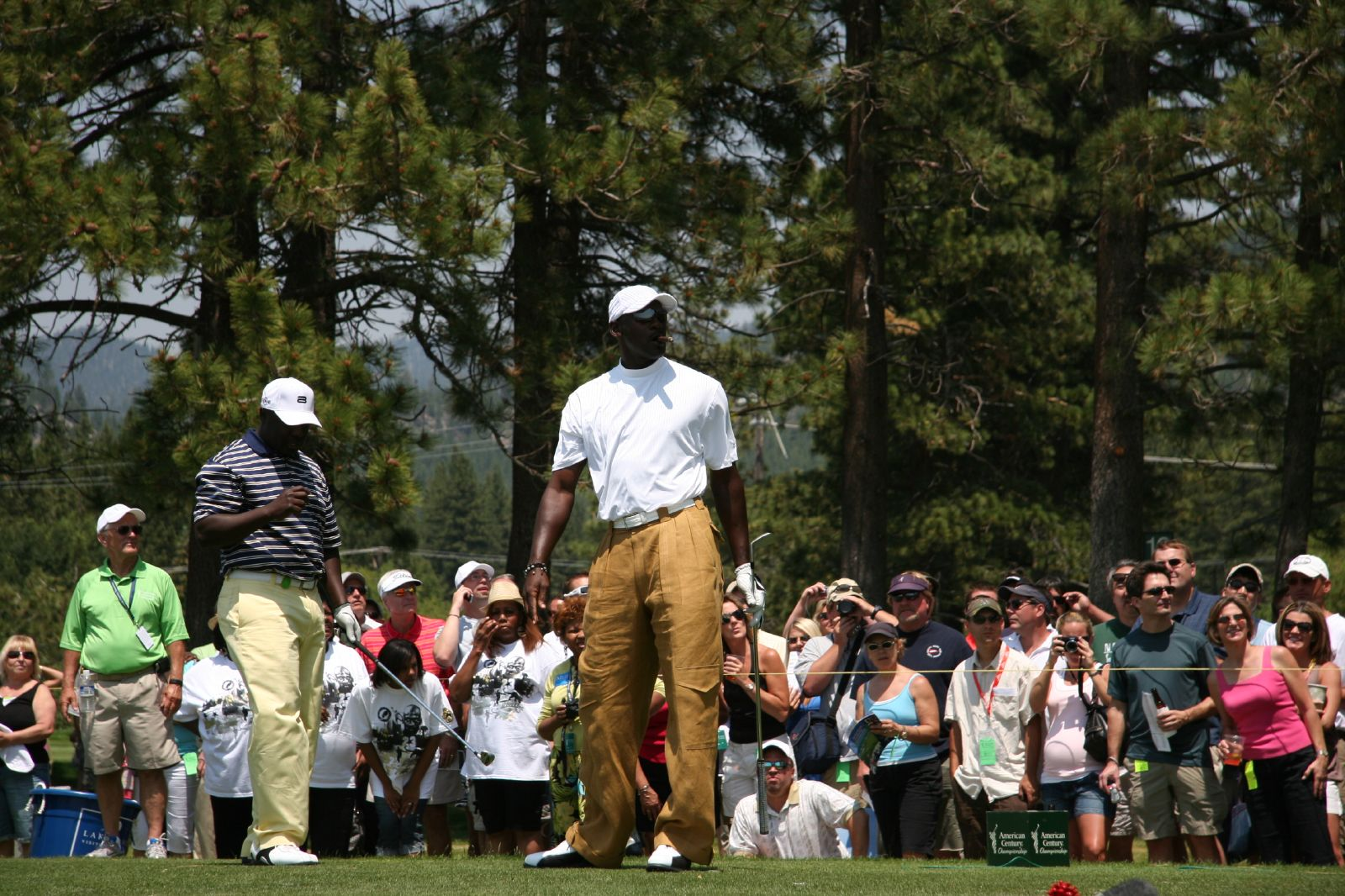
Michael Jordan (right) after teeing off and Marshall Faulk (left) getting ready to tee off in 2008

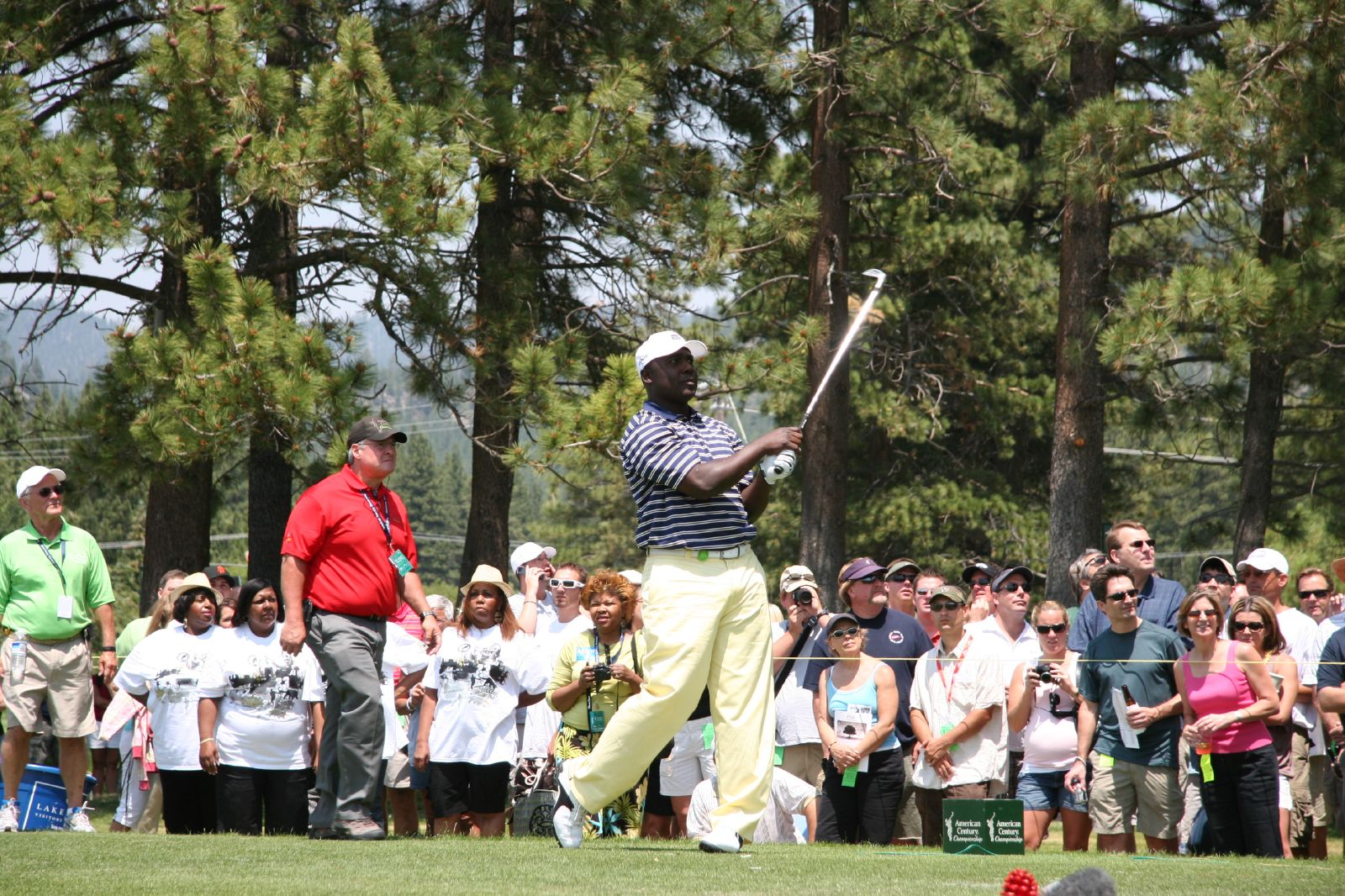
Marshall Faulk teeing off in 2008

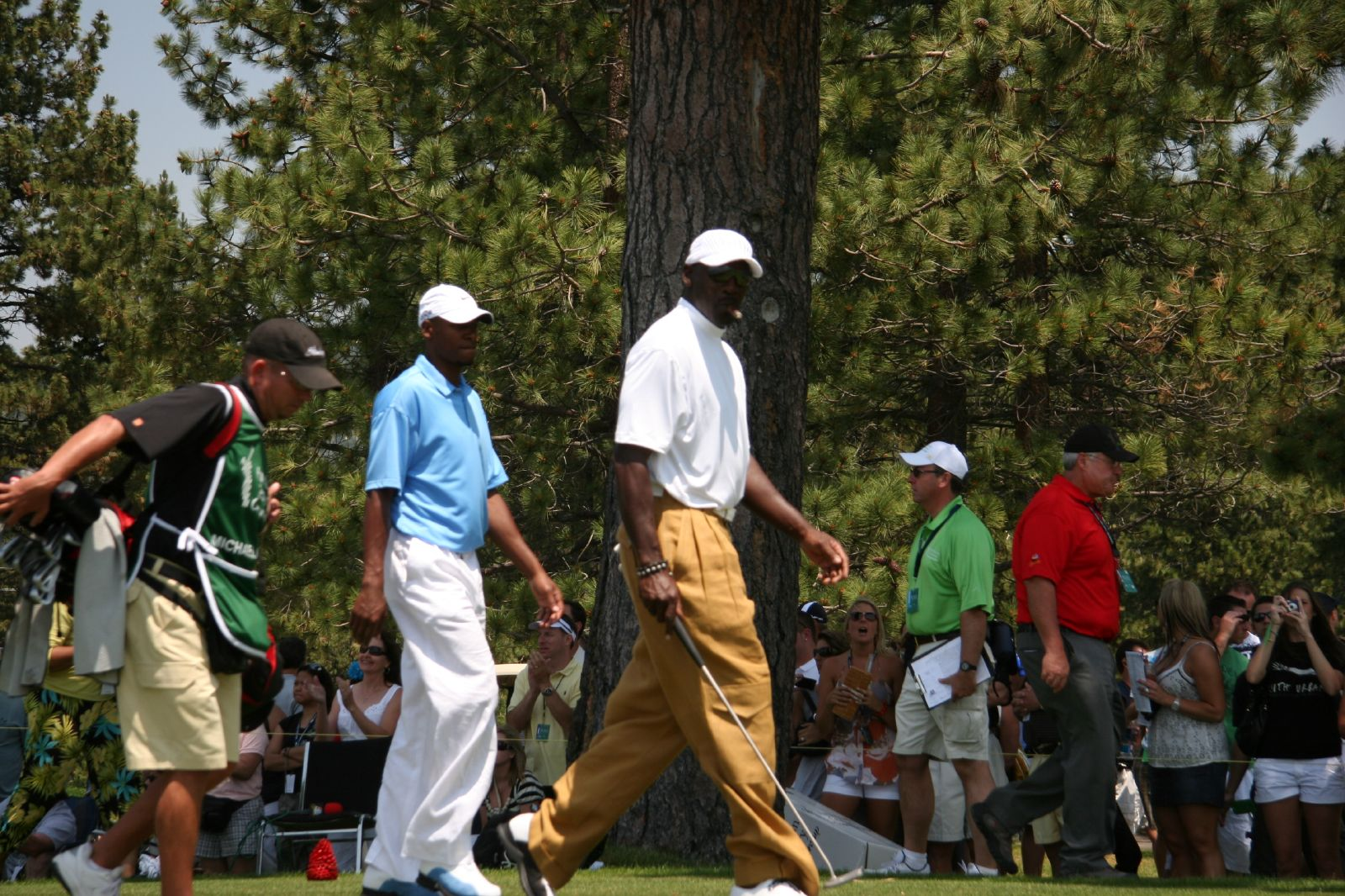
Michael Jordan (right) and Ray Allen (left) in 2008

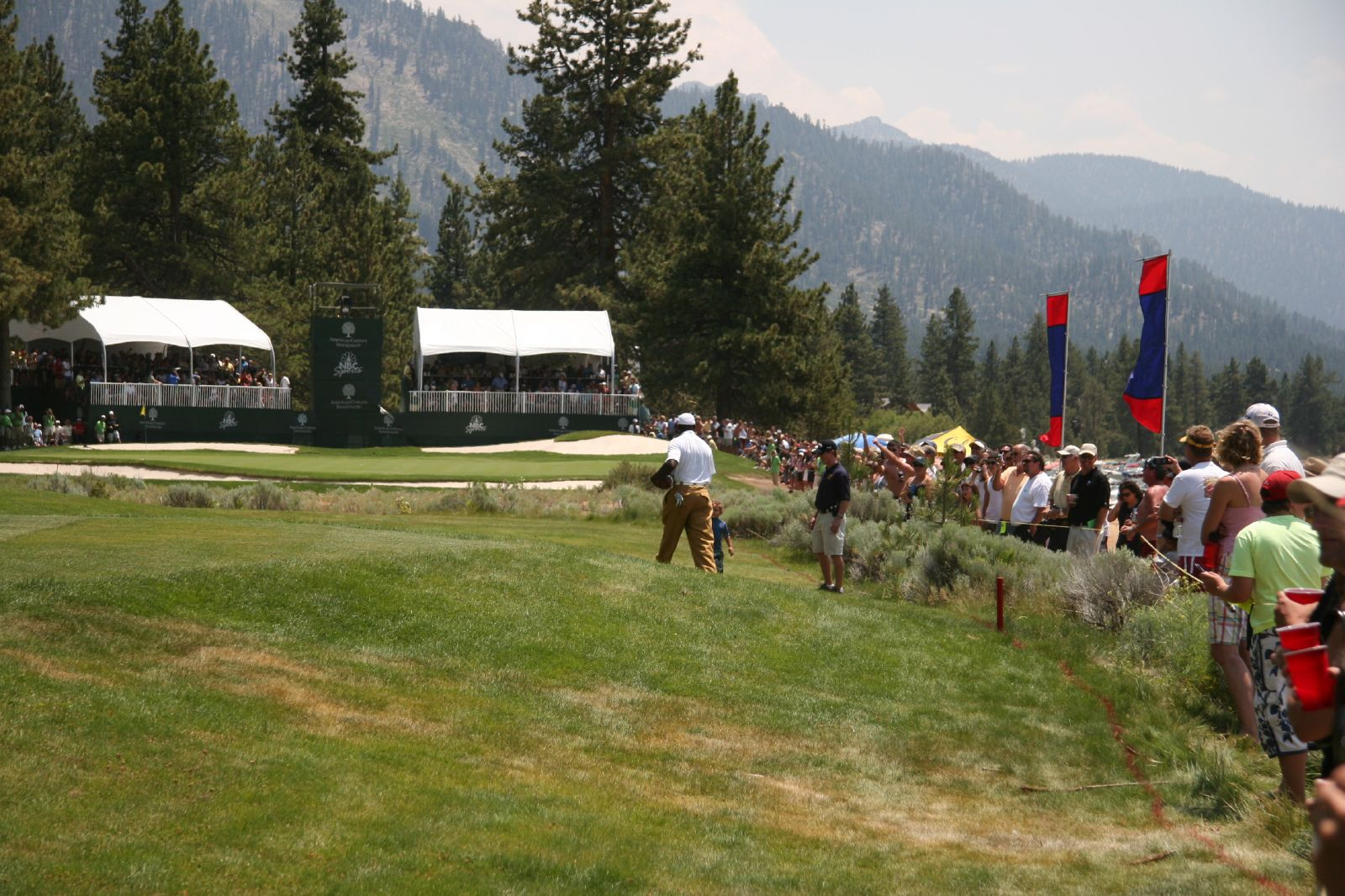
Michael Jordan approaching the green from the beach on the 17th hole in 2008

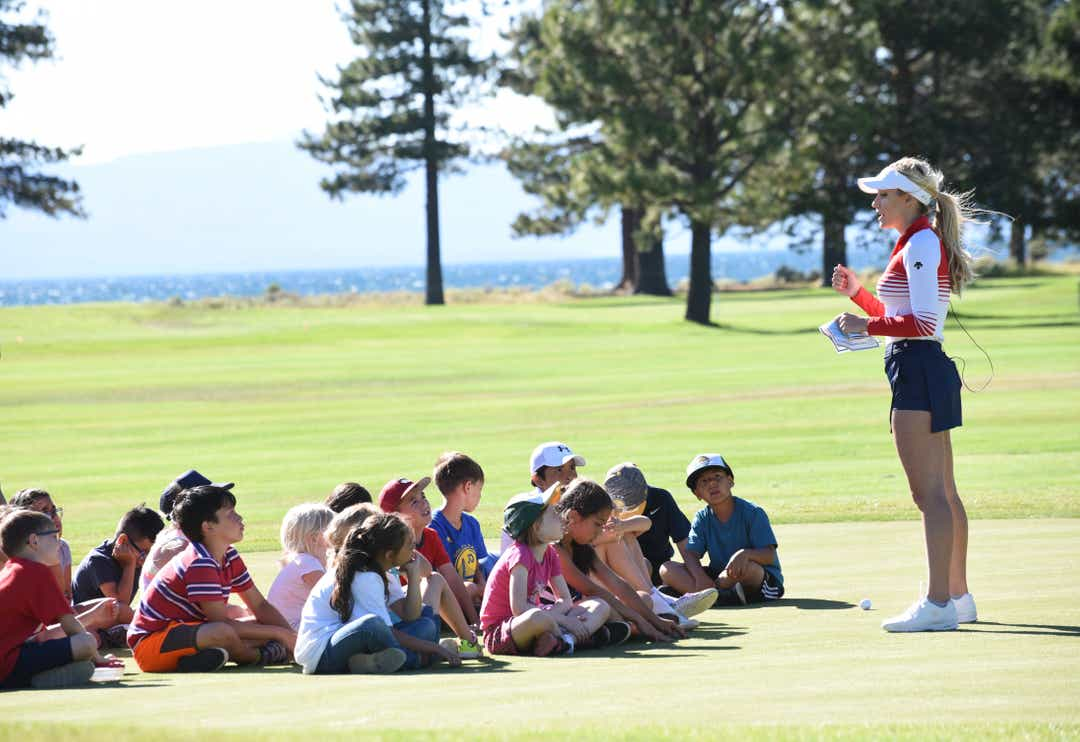
Paige Spiranac speaking to kids about cyberbullying at the event in 2017

Legend
^	As active professional athlete
	Won the tournament
	Tournament record
^	Denotes single tournament participants record progression

=== Awards ===
The total prize money for the 2024 American Century Championship was $750,000, with $150,000 going to the winner. The winner is presented a trophy on the 18th green after the final round.

=== Tournament events ===
There are events scheduled around the tournament, including practice rounds. The Korbel Long Drive Challenge takes place on the 16th tee.

=== Long Drive Challenge ===
The Korbel Long Drive Challenge takes place on the 16th tee.

Year	Winner	Profession Position	Distance	Runner(s)-up	Profession Position
1990	No event				
1991	No event				
1992	(United States) Jim McMahon^	Football; Quarterback	327 yds	(United States) Rick Barry	Basketball; Small forward
1993	(United States) Bill Laimbeer^	Basketball; Center	348 yds	(United States) Jeremy Roenick^	Ice hockey Centre
1994	(United States) Jim McMahon^ (2)	Football (2); Quarterback	300 yds	(United States) Chris Chandler (United States) Mike Schmidt (Canada) Mark Rypien	Football; Quarterback; Baseball; Third baseman Football (2); Quarterback (2)
1995	(United States) John Elway^	Football (3); Quarterback	375 yds	(United States) Bill Laimbeer	Basketball (2); Center
1996	(United States) Pete Sampras^	Tennis player	332 yds	(United States) Jim McMahon^	Football (3); Quarterback (3)
1997	(United States) Chris Chandler^	Football (4); Quarterback	346 yds	(United States) Bill Laimbeer (2)	Basketball (3); Center
1998	(United States) Mike Modano^	Ice hockey Centre	379 yds	(United States) John Elway^	Football (4); Quarterback (4)
1999	(United States) Emmitt Smith^	Football (5); Running back	373 yds	(Canada) (United States) Brett Hull^	Ice hockey (2); Right wing
2000	(United States) Jeremy Roenick^	Ice hockey (2); Centre	357 yds	(Canada) Grant Fuhr	Ice hockey (3); Goaltender
2001	(United States) Billy Joe Tolliver^	Football (6); Quarterback	378 yds	(United States) Brian Kinchen^	Football (5); Tight end / Long snapper
2002	(United States) Jeremy Roenick^ (2)	Ice hockey (3); Centre	340 yds	(United States) John Elway (2)	Football (6); Quarterback (5)
2003	(United States) Steve Beuerlein^	Football (7); Quarterback	339 yds	(United States) Mark McGwire	Baseball (2); First baseman
2004	(United States) Brian Kinchen	Football (8); Tight end / Long snapper	393 yds	(United States) Billy Joe Tolliver	Football (7); Quarterback (6)
2005	(United States) David Carr^	Football (9); Quarterback	334 yds	(United States) Billy Joe Tolliver (2)	Football (8); Quarterback (7)
2006	(United States) Paul O’Neill	Baseball; Right fielder	357 yds	(United States) David Carr^	Football (9); Quarterback (8)
2007	(United States) Jim McMahon (3)	Football (10); Quarterback	319 yds	(United States) Lucas Black	Actor
2008	(United States) Kenny Lofton	Baseball (2); Center fielder	335 yds in playoff	(United States) Billy Joe Tolliver (3)	Football (10); Quarterback (9)
2009	(United States) AJ Hawk^	Football (11); Linebacker	322 yds	(United States) Chris Chandler (2)	Football (11); Quarterback (10)
2010	(United States) Alfonso Ribiero	Actor	333 yds	(United States) Kyle Boller^	Football (12); Quarterback (11)
2011	(United States) AJ Hawk^ (2)	Football (12); Linebacker	337 yds	(United States) Mark Mulder	Baseball (3); Pitcher
2022	(United States) Jon Lester	Baseball; Pitcher	343 yds	(United States) Travis Kelce^	Football; Tight end
2023	(United States) Travis Kelce^	Football; Tight end	367 yds		
2024	(United States) Jason Kelce	Football; Center	322 yds		

=== Charity Chip Challenge ===
They added a chipping challenge in 2023.

=== Korbel Hole-In-One Contest ===
The Korbel Hole-In-One Contest takes place on the 17th hole.

Year	Winner	Profession Position	Distance	Donation
2012	(United States) John Elway	Football; Quarterback	6' 7.5"	Lake Tahoe Community College Foundation
2013	(United States) Bode Miller^	alpine ski racer	13' 7"	Tahoe Tallac Association
2014	(Canada) Mark Rypien	Football (2); Quarterback (2)	7'	Tahoe Fund
2015	(United States) Willie Robertson	TV personality	12' 1"	Lake Tahoe Wildlife Care
2016	(United States) Joe Theismann	Football (3); Quarterback (3)	3' 4"	Take Care Tahoe
2017	(United States) Mark Mulder	Baseball; Pitcher	12' 4"	Douglas County Search and Rescue
2018	(United States) Derek Lowe	Baseball (2); Pitcher (2)	7' 11"	SOS Outreach
2019	(United States) Derek Lowe (2)	Baseball (3); Pitcher (3)	21"	Tahoe Prosperity Center
2020	(Mexico) Canelo Álvarez^	Boxer	13' 1"	Boys & Girls Club of Lake Tahoe
2021	(United States) Michael Peña	Actor	16' 4"	Lake Tahoe Wildlife Care (2)
2022	(United States) Alfonso Ribeiro	Actor (2) / Comedian	3' 3"	South Lake Tahoe Family Resource Center
2023	(United States) Alfonso Ribeiro	Actor (3) / Comedian (2)	5' 8"	American Century Celebrity Tournament Charity

== Format ==
A 54-hole event, the first fourteen editions were conducted under standard stroke play. The following modified Stableford format has been used since 2004:

Modified Stableford Scoring
Points
Double Eagle	10
Hole-in-one	8
Eagle	6
Birdie	3
Par	1
Bogey	0
Double Bogey+	-2

== Course ==
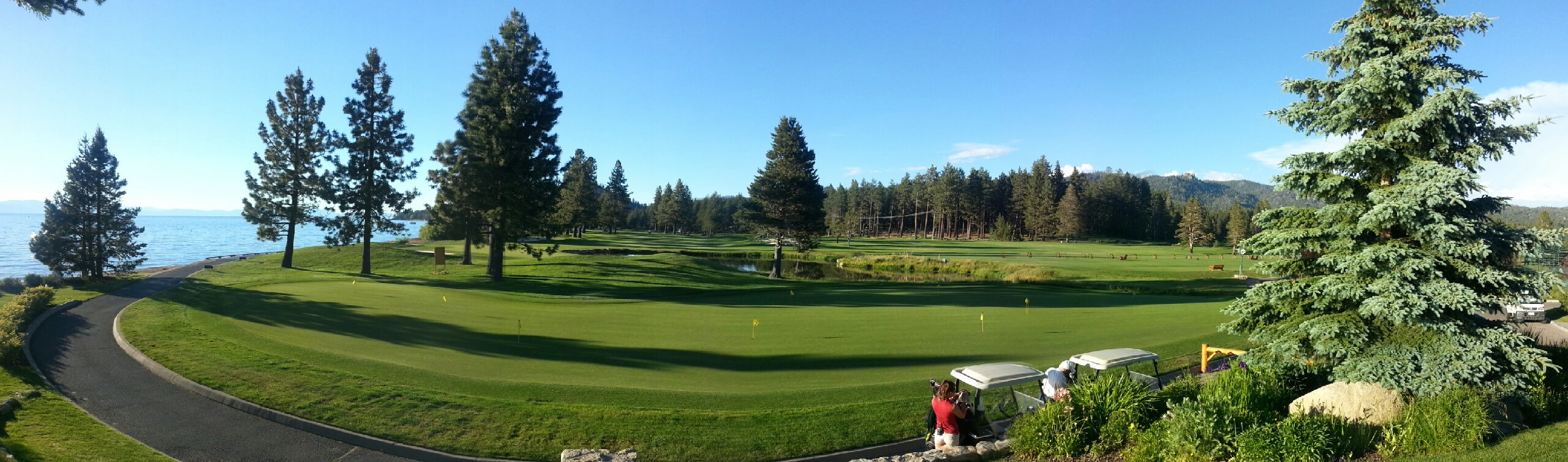
The golf course at Edgewood Tahoe Resort in 2013

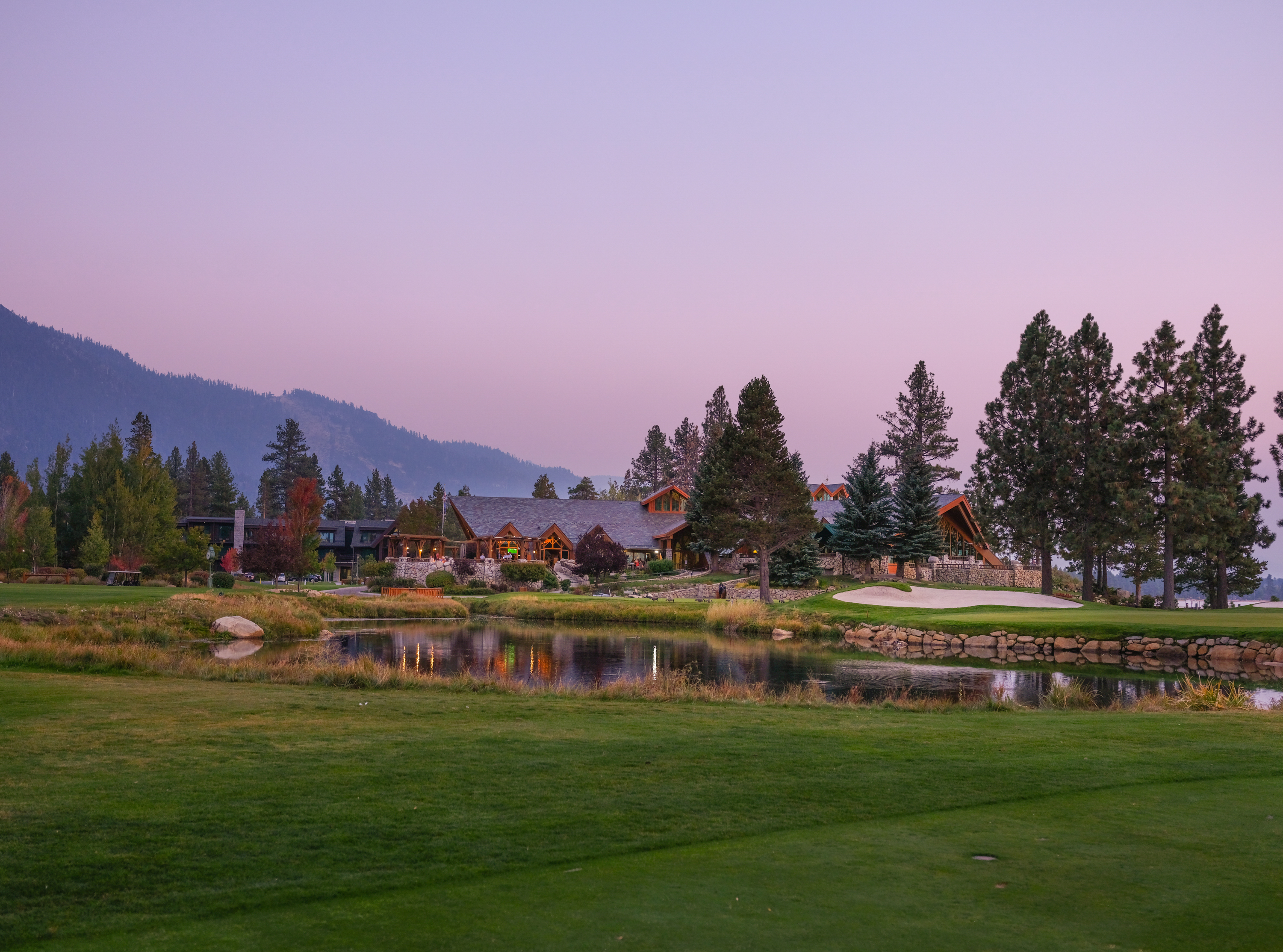
Edgewood Tahoe Resort circa 2020

Hole	Yards	Par	Hole	Yards	Par
1	370	4	10	425	4
2	362	4	11	328	4
3	532	5	12	140	3
4	536	5	13	413	4
5	152	3	14	411	4
6	417	4	15	392	4
7	165	3	16	546	5
8	382	4	17	163	3
9	381	4	18	501	5
Out	3,183	36	In	3,156	36
Source:			Total	6,709	72

Lengths of the course for the American Century Championship every year:

- 1990–1998: 6,725 yards (6,149 m)
- 1999, 2001: 6,707 yards (6,133 m)
- 2000: 6,771 yards (6,191 m)
- 2002–2003: 6,710 yards (6,136 m)
- 2004–2005, 2010: 6,972 yards (6,375 m)
- 2006–2009: 7,072 yards (6,467 m)
- 2011–2014: 6,865 yards (6,277 m)
- 2015–present: 6,709 yards (6,135 m)

=== Course adjustments ===
Holes one and two on the front nine were switched with holes ten and 11 on the back nine. The tees and distance are rotated on the par threes every day.

== Field ==
The American Century Championship participants are celebrities, both male and female. Although participation by professional golfers is usually avoided, a handful of female players with professional and/or collegiate experience have been invited to play, the most notable being Annika Sörenstam, who has one runner-up finish at Edgewood Lake Tahoe. The size of the field has gradually increased over the years to meet the growing interest of celebrities wanting to compete. 93 players were a part of the 2023 event.

== Most wins ==
The first winner of this celebrity golf tournament was Mark Rypien in 1990, and he repeated in 2014. The player with the most tournament victories is Rick Rhoden, who won eight times between 1991 and 2009. Dan Quinn has five wins, followed by Billy Joe Tolliver with four, and Mark Mulder, Tony Romo, and Mardy Fish have three titles to their name. Rypien was the tournament's first foreign-born winner in the inaugural event with his first victory in 1990. Two-time champions include Jack Wagner and Rypien.

== Winners ==
#	Year	Winner	Profession Position	Score	To par	Margin of victory	Runner(s)-up	Profession Position	Purse (US$)	Winner's share ($)	Ref.
1st	1990	(Canada) Mark Rypien^	Football; Quarterback	221	+5	1 stroke	(United States) Dick Anderson	Football; Safety	400,000	75,000	
2nd	1991	(United States) Rick Rhoden	Baseball; Pitcher	221 (2)	+5 (2)	Playoff	(United States) (2) Bill Laimbeer^	Basketball; Center	400,000 (2)	75,000 (2)	
3rd	1992	(Canada) (2) Dan Quinn^	Ice hockey Centre	213	–3	1 stroke (2)	(United States) (3) Rick Rhoden (United States) (4) Dick Anderson (2)	Baseball; Pitcher; Football (2); Safety (2)	400,000 (3)	75,000 (3)	
4th	1993	(United States) (2) Rick Rhoden (2)	Baseball (2); Pitcher (2)	207	−9	4 strokes	(United States) (5) Johnny Bench	Baseball (2) Catcher	400,000 (4)	75,000 (4)	
5th	1994	(United States) (3) Dick Anderson	Football (2); Safety	212	–4	Playoff (2)	(United States) (6) Steve Bartkowski (United States) (7) Rick Rhoden (2)	Football (3); Quarterback; Baseball (3); Pitcher (2)	400,000 (5)	75,000 (5)	
6th	1995	(United States) (4) Rick Rhoden (3)	Baseball (3); Pitcher (3)	211	–5	5 strokes	(United States) (8) Peter Tom Willis	Football (4); Quarterback (2)	400,000 (6)	75,000 (6)	
7th	1996	(United States) (5) Billy Joe Tolliver^	Football (3); Quarterback (2)	211 (2)	–5 (2)	4 strokes (2)	(United States) (9) Donny Anderson	Football (5); Running back / Punter	400,000 (7)	75,000 (7)	
8th	1997	(United States) (6) Rick Rhoden (4)	Baseball (4); Pitcher (4)	207 (2)	−9 (2)	3 strokes	(Canada) Dan Quinn (United States) (10) John Brodie	Ice hockey Centre; Football (6); Quarterback (3)	500,000	100,000	
9th	1998	(Canada) (3) Mario Lemieux	Ice hockey (2); Centre (2)	212 (2)	–4 (2)	1 stroke (3)	(United States) (11) Billy Joe Tolliver (United States) (12) Dick Anderson (3)	Football (7); Quarterback (4); Football (8); Safety (3)	500,000 (2)	100,000 (2)	
10th	1999	(United States) (7) Rick Rhoden (5)	Baseball (5); Pitcher (5)	212 (3)	–4 (3)	9 strokes	(Canada) (2) Dan Quinn (2) (United States) (13) Billy Joe Tolliver (2)	Ice hockey (2); Centre (2); Football (9); Quarterback (5)	500,000 (3)	100,000 (3)	
11th	2000	(United States) (8) Al Del Greco^	Football (4); Placekicker	210	–6	3 strokes (2)	(United States) (14) Dick Anderson (4)	Football (10); Safety (4)	500,000 (4)	100,000 (4)	
12th	2001	(Canada) (4) Dan Quinn (2)	Ice hockey (3); Centre (3)	207 (3)	−9 (3)	3 strokes (3)	(United States) (15) Rick Rhoden (3)	Baseball (4); Pitcher (3)	500,000 (5)	100,000 (5)	
13th	2002	(Canada) (5) Dan Quinn (3)	Ice hockey (4); Centre (4)	213 (2)	–3 (2)	2 strokes	(United States) (16) Rick Rhoden (4)	Baseball (5); Pitcher (4)	500,000 (6)	100,000 (6)	
14th	2003	(United States) (9) Rick Rhoden (6)	Baseball (6); Pitcher (6)	218	+2	2 strokes (2)	(United States) (17) Jack Wagner	Actor / Singer	500,000 (7)	100,000 (7)	

#	Year	Winner	Profession Position	Points	Margin of victory	Runner(s)-up	Profession Position	Purse (US$)	Winner's share ($)	Ref.
15th	2004	(Canada) (6) Dan Quinn (4)	Ice hockey (5); Centre (5)	74	1 point	(United States) (18) Rick Rhoden (5)	Baseball (6); Pitcher (5)	500,000 (8)	100,000 (8)	
16th	2005	(United States) (10) Billy Joe Tolliver (2)	Football (5); Quarterback (3)	76	4 points	(United States) (19) Trent Dilfer^	Football (11); Quarterback (6)	500,000 (9)	100,000 (9)	
17th	2006	(United States) (11) Jack Wagner	Actor / Singer	70	1 point (2)	(United States) (20) Billy Joe Tolliver (3)	Football (12); Quarterback (7)	500,000 (10)	100,000 (10)	
18th	2007	(United States) (12) Chris Chandler	Football (6); Quarterback (4)	78	5 points	(United States) (21) Rick Rhoden (6)	Baseball (7); Pitcher (6)	600,000	125,000	
19th	2008	(United States) (13) Rick Rhoden (7)	Baseball (7); Pitcher (7)	68	1 point (3)	(Canada) (3) Dan Quinn (3)	Ice hockey (3); Centre (3)	600,000 (2)	125,000 (2)	
20th	2009	(United States) (14) Rick Rhoden (8)	Baseball (8); Pitcher (8)	74 (2)	3 points	(United States) (22) Tony Romo^	Football (13); Quarterback (8)	600,000 (3)	125,000 (3)	
21st	2010	(United States) (15) Billy Joe Tolliver (3)	Football (7); Quarterback (5)	84	19 points	(United States) (23) John Smoltz (United States) (24) Tony Romo (2) (United States) (25) John Elway (United States) (26) Jack Wagner (2)	Baseball (8); Pitcher (7); Football (14); Quarterback (9); Football (15); Quarterback (10); Actor (2) / Singer (2)	600,000 (4)	125,000 (4)	
22nd	2011	(United States) (16) Jack Wagner (2)	Actor (2) / Singer (2)	80	3 points (2)	(United States) (27) Tony Romo^ (3)	Football (16); Quarterback (11)	600,000 (5)	125,000 (5)	
23rd	2012	(Canada) (7) Dan Quinn (5)	Ice hockey (6); Centre (6)	66	6 points	(Canada) (4) Mark Rypien	Football (17); Quarterback (12)	600,000 (6)	125,000 (6)	
24th	2013	(United States) (17) Billy Joe Tolliver (4)	Football (8); Quarterback (6)	67	Playoff (3)	(Canada) (5) Mark Rypien (2)	Football (18); Quarterback (13)	600,000 (7)	125,000 (7)	
25th	2014	(Canada) (8) Mark Rypien (2)	Football (9); Quarterback (7)	76 (2)	11 points	(United States) (28) Jeremy Roenick (Sweden) Annika Sörenstam	Ice hockey (4); Centre (4); Golfer	600,000 (8)	125,000 (8)	
26th	2015	(United States) (18) Mark Mulder	Baseball (9); Pitcher (9)	82	1 point (4)	(Canada) (6) Éric Gagné	Baseball (9); Pitcher (8)	600,000 (9)	125,000 (9)	
27th	2016	(United States) (19) Mark Mulder (2)	Baseball (10); Pitcher (10)	74 (3)	5 points (2)	(United States) (29) Mardy Fish	Tennis player	600,000 (10)	125,000 (10)	
28th	2017	(United States) (20) Mark Mulder (3)	Baseball (11); Pitcher (11)	73	11 point (2)	(United States) (30) Mardy Fish (2)	Tennis player (2)	600,000 (11)	125,000 (11)	
29th	2018	(United States) (21) Tony Romo	Football (10); Quarterback (8)	71	3 points (3)	(United States) (31) Mark Mulder	Baseball (10); Pitcher (9)	600,000 (12)	125,000 (12)	
30th	2019	(United States) (22) Tony Romo (2)	Football (11); Quarterback (9)	71 (2)	10 points	(United States) (32) Mark Mulder (2)	Baseball (11); Pitcher (10)	600,000 (13)	125,000 (13)	
31st	2020	(United States) (23) Mardy Fish	Tennis player	76 (3)	9 points	(United States) (33) Kyle Williams	Football (19); Defensive tackle	600,000 (14)	125,000 (14)	
32nd	2021	(United States) (24) Vinny Del Negro	Basketball; Point guard / Shooting guard / Head coach	69	Playoff (4)	(United States) (34) John Smoltz (2)	Baseball (12); Pitcher (11)	600,000 (15)	125,000 (15)	
33rd	2022	(United States) (25) Tony Romo (3)	Football (12); Quarterback (10)	62	Playoff (5)	(United States) (35) Mark Mulder (3) (United States) (36) Joe Pavelski	Baseball (13); Pitcher (12); Ice hockey (5); Centre (5) / Right wing	600,000 (16)	125,000 (16)	
34th	2023	(United States) (26) Stephen Curry^	Basketball (2); Point guard (2)	75	2 points	(United States) (37) Mardy Fish (3)	Tennis player (3)	600,000 (17)	125,000 (17)	
35th	2024	(United States) (27) Mardy Fish (2)	Tennis player (2)	83	4 points (2)	(United States) (38) Joe Pavelski (2)	Ice hockey (6); Centre (6) / Right wing (2)	750,000	150,000	
36th	2025	(United States) (28) Joe Pavelski	Ice hockey (7); Centre (7) / Right wing	73	9 points (2)	(United States) (39) John Smoltz (3)	Baseball (14); Pitcher (13)	750,000 (2)	150,000 (2)	
37th	2026	(United States) (29) Mardy Fish (3)	Tennis player (3)	72	6 points (2)	(United States) (40) Joe Pavelski (3)	Ice hockey (7); Centre (7) / Right wing (3)	750,000 (3)	150,000 (3)	

== Multi-time winners ==
Wins	Celebrity	Years
8	(United States) Rick Rhoden	1991, 1993, 1995, 1997, 1999, 2003, 2008, 2009
5	(Canada) Dan Quinn	1992, 2001, 2002, 2004, 2012
4	(United States) Billy Joe Tolliver	1996, 2005, 2010, 2013
3	(United States) Mark Mulder	2015, 2016, 2017
3	(United States) Tony Romo	2018, 2019, 2022
3	(United States) Mardy Fish	2020, 2024, 2026
2	(United States) Jack Wagner	2006, 2011
2	(Canada) Mark Rypien	1990, 2014

== Records ==
Jim McMahon and Jack Wagner have played in all 37 events in the history of the tournament.

Most points scored in a single tournament since 2004
#	Year	Name	Points
21st	2010	(United States) Billy Joe Tolliver	84
35th	2024	(United States) (4) Mardy Fish	83
26th	2015	(United States) (3) Mark Mulder	82
26th	2015	(Canada) Éric Gagné	81
22nd	2011	(United States) (2) Jack Wagner	80

Most points scored in a single round since 2004
#	Year	Name	Round	Points
31st	2020	(United States) (8) Mardy Fish	Second	37
35th	2024	(United States) (9) Mardy Fish (2)	Second	34
21st	2010	(United States) (3) Billy Joe Tolliver	Second	33
25th	2014	(Canada) (2) Mark Rypien	Final	33 (2)
26th	2015	(United States) (5) Josh Scobee	Second	33 (3)
20th	2009	(Canada) Grant Fuhr	Second	32
18th	2007	(United States) (2) Chris Chandler	Final	31
22nd	2011	(United States) (4) Tony Romo	Final	31 (2)
29th	2018	(United States) (7) Mark Mulder (2)	Second	31 (3)
16th	2005	(United States) Rick Rhoden	First	30
26th	2015	(Canada) (3) Éric Gagné	Final	30 (2)
26th	2015	(United States) (6) Mark Mulder	Final	30 (3)

== Broadcasting ==
=== United States television ===
Network	Years of broadcast
NBC Sports	1990–present

The American Century Championship tournament was developed to fill air time after NBC lost the airing rights to Major League Baseball. It was originally titled The Celebrity Golf Association, the brainchild of Jim Karvellas. Initially, the tournament had no title sponsor, but landed three future Hall of Fame players from different sports: John Elway, Michael Jordan, and Mario Lemieux. Karvellas is quoted as saying: "They are here at Caesars Tahoe this week, because they believe in the concept, they love the game of golf and they like to compete. I shall be forever indebted to them for that."

Round 1 of the American Century Championship starts on Friday and is broadcast live on NBC Sports and Peacock from 4:00 to 6:00 PM ET. After Round 1 is recorded, the tape plays on Golf Channel from 9:30 to 11:30 PM ET. Rounds 2 and 3 of the American Century Championship follows and concludes on Saturday and Sunday, respectively. Both are broadcast live on NBC Sports and Peacock from 2:30 to 6:00 PM ET.

=== Naming rights ===
The first tournament was held 36 years ago in 1990 and sponsored by NBC, which broadcasts the second and third round coverage on the weekend. The inaugural tournament was the first annual Celebrity Golf Championship. Isuzu sponsored the tournament from 1992 through 1998, making it the annual Isuzu Celebrity Golf Championship. On Monday, September 21, 1998, American Isuzu Motors Inc. announced that it would no longer be sponsoring the event. Current sponsor American Century Investments succeeded Isuzu in 1998, making it the American Century Celebrity Golf Championship from 1998 to 2002. Since 2003, it has been the American Century Championship. In July 2015, American Century Investments extended its sponsorship to 2022. On Monday, July 10, 2023, NBC Sports and American Century Investments announced a six-year extension of the American Century Championship through 2029.

== Ticketing ==
Tickets are $40.00 for practice rounds and $50.00 for actual rounds.
