= Kelso & Company =

American private equity firm

- Type: Publicly traded company
- Industry: Private Equity
- Founded: 1971; 55 years ago
- Headquarters: New York City, New York, United States
- Key people: Phil Berney (co-CEO); Frank Loverro (co-CEO); Frank Nickell (chairman)
- Products: Private equity funds, Leveraged buyouts, Recapitalizations, Growth capital
- AUM: $11.2 billion
- Website: www.kelso.com

Kelso & Company is an American private equity firm focusing on leveraged buyouts, recapitalizations and growth capital transactions. Kelso invests in a variety of sectors, including communication, manufacturing and restaurants. Kelso is based in New York City.

Kelso also provides mezzanine capital through a joint venture with asset management firm BlackRock. Their joint venture, BlackRock Kelso Capital Corp. (Nasdaq: BKCC), is organized as a type of publicly traded private equity company known as a Business Development Company.

== History ==
Founded in 1971 as Kelso Bangert & Company, the firm acted as both an advisor and merchant bank, both making investments and advising on mergers and acquisitions. Kelso was founded by Louis O. Kelso, a lawyer and economist who is given credit for developing the concept for employee stock ownership plans, in 1956. Kelso, alongside a sister company Louis O. Kelso Inc., focused initially on M&A activity involving Employee Stock Ownership Plans.

Kelso raised its first private equity fund and has had a dedicated private equity investment platform since 1980. Louis O. Kelso, who died in 1991, transitioned management of the firm to Joseph Schuchert to focus on writing and lecturing.

In June 2016, Kelso closed its latest fund at $2.6 billion.

== Investments ==
Kelso & Company has invested in energy, materials, retailing, industrial and consumer products, telecommunication services, financial services, and healthcare sectors. The company typically invests in North America with a focus on the United States. It targets investing between $50 million and $600 million in firms that have a value of between $250 million and $2.5 billion.

In December 2021, Kelso completed the acquisition of ReSource Pro, a leading provider of business process management (BPO) and consulting services to insurance brokers and carriers.
