= American Capital =

U.S. financial services firm

American Capital Ltd.
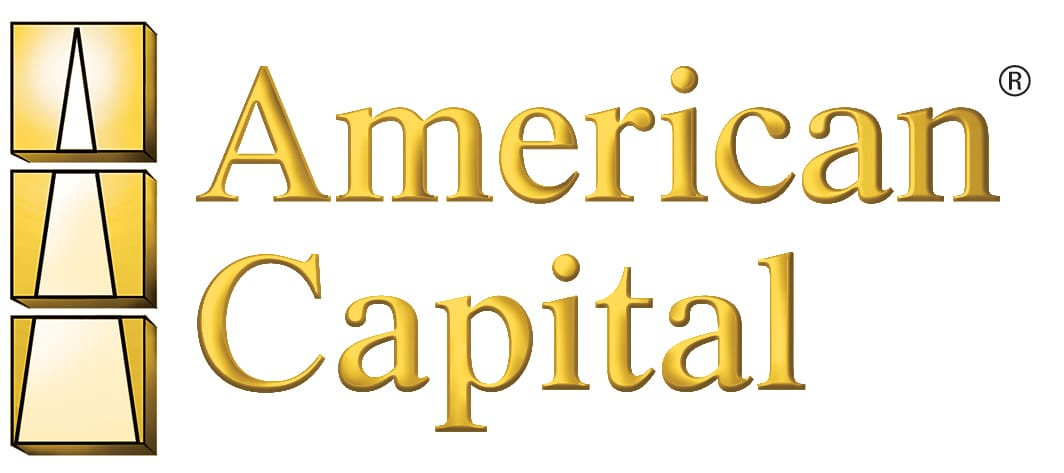
- Type: Public
- Traded as: Nasdaq: ACAS
- Industry: Financial services: Private equity (1997–2017)
- Founded: 1986; 40 years ago
- Founder: Malon Wilkus
- Fate: Acquired by Ares Management
- Headquarters: Bethesda, Maryland
- Products: Private capital management

American Capital, Ltd. was a publicly traded private equity and global asset management firm, trading on NASDAQ under the symbol "ACAS" from 1997 to 2017 and a component of the S&P 500 Index from 2007 to 2009. American Capital was sold to Ares Management in 2017 for US$4.1 billion. Investors who had bought American Capital stock in its August 29, 1997 IPO received a 14% compounded annual return including dividends after the sale.

== History ==
=== The early years ===
American Capital was founded by Malon Wilkus in 1986. He was chairperson and chief executive officer (CEO) until the time of the sale of American Capital in 2017. The company was headquartered in Bethesda, Maryland. It made its first investment in the equity of an employee owned middle market company in 1990. By August 1997, American Capital had facilitated approximately 18 ESOP transactions (Employee Stock Ownership Plans), and had invested in the equity of 7 employee buyouts. Based on third party valuations and net realized gains, the return on these investments was 36% per annum prior to its IPO. American Capital went public on August 29, 1997, in a $155 million equity offering. At the time of its IPO American Capital changed its operations and tax status to a Business Development Company (BDC). In 1998, American Capital expanded and opened additional offices in Chicago and Dallas.

Entering the New Century

By 2000, American Capital opened offices in Los Angeles and Philadelphia. It also formed an internal Operations Team headed by Gordon O’Brien, composed of former C-level executives and vice presidents who would work onsite at its portfolio companies to maximize returns. During 2001, American Capital formed an internal financial analysis and compliance team headed by Jay Beam, to perform financial due diligence for buyout investments and to provide financial and information technology (IT) advisory services to portfolio companies and to conduct internal valuations. The team had approximately 90 finance, IT and accounting personnel at its peak.

In 2005, American Capital raised €750 million of equity for European Capital Ltd. (ECAS) and ECAS opened offices in Paris and London. Nathalie Faure Beaulieu and Jean Eichenlaub were appointed managing directors. In addition in 2005, American Capital expanded its investment strategy by establishing specialized investment teams focusing on Special Situations, Syndication, Energy, Commercial Mortgage Asset Management Group, and Leverage Finance.

American Capital's growth continued in 2006 with the establishment of a technology investment team headed by Virginia Turezyn and Andy Fillat, who were appointed managing directors, with offices in Boston and Palo Alto. Bob Grunewald was appointed managing director of the newly formed American Capital Financial Services Group. The company raised its second externally managed private equity fund, American Capital Equity I, through a novel sale of a significant portion of its private equity investments to a third-party fund that it then managed. American Capital also received investment grade ratings from Moody's, S&P and Fitch.

In May 2006, European Capital was taken public and traded on the London Stock Exchange.

In the Spring of 2007, American Capital was included in the S&P 500 index of public companies. European Capital opened additional offices in Frankfurt and Madrid and formed specialized teams to invest in distressed debt and second lien loans.

=== The Great Recession ===
The Great Recession lasted from 2007 to 2009. As a BDC, American Capital had to fair-value its assets quarterly so that it had to dramatically depreciate its assets, whether they were performing or not, in line with comparable market valuations. Performance declined, in many cases materially, at some of its portfolio companies and investments.

In response, in 2008 American Capital closed offices in Los Angeles, Palo Alto, Philadelphia and San Francisco, continuing to operate offices in Bethesda, Boston, Dallas, Providence and New York. European Capital closed offices in Frankfurt and Madrid, continuing to operate offices in London and Paris.

Also in 2008, American Capital launched and took public American Capital Agency (NASDAQ: AGNC). Due to the dramatic depreciation of its assets, American Capital defaulted on its debt and began negotiations with its creditors. In the third quarter, American Capital terminated its regular quarterly dividend, and was removed from the S&P 500 index in early 2009. European Capital, whose stock price and performance was subject to the same depreciating environment as American Capital and other financial assets during the Great Recession, was taken private by merging into American Capital during 2009.

=== Re-financing ===
In April 2010, through a direct equity offering primarily with Paulsen & Co. Inc, $295 million of equity was raised. A refinancing agreement was reached with American Capital creditors in mid-2010. Under the terms of the transaction, lenders and note-holders had the option of receiving either cash or new secured debt, in each case in the full principal amount of their pre-transaction debt. Lenders and note-holders holding $1.03 billion of debt, 44% of pre-transaction debt, selected and received 100% cash for their debt, while lenders and note-holders holding $1.31 billion of debt, 56% of pre-transaction debt, elected to receive new secured loans or notes of various series. By 2011, American Capital Agency had raised $4.4 billion of equity through offerings in January, March, June and November. It also initiated an IPO of newly formed American Capital Mortgage Investment Corp (NASDAQ: MTGE). American Capital continued to re-leverage its balance sheet after the Great Recession. In 2012, it refinanced its debt in June and raised $250 million of debt in August. American Capital raised $362 million of debt for its third externally managed CLO. At the same time, American Capital created American Capital Infrastructure, and an Annapolis, MD office was opened. The year 2013 allowed American Capital to form a Leveraged Finance Investment Team and a Lower Middle Market Investment Team led by managing directors Sean Eagle, Eugene Krichevsky, David Steinglass, and Justin DuFour. In addition, American Capital launched American Capital Senior Floating (ACSF). Also, S&P upgraded its rating of American Capital from BB− to B+ in August of this year. However, American Capital closed its Boston office. In January 2014, American Capital Senior Floating raised $150 million of equity through its IPO. During 2014, American Capital approved a plan to split the company's businesses by transferring most of the corporation's investment assets to two newly established business development companies (BDCs), American Capital Growth and Income and American Capital Income. American Capital would continue primarily in the asset management business and would manage these two new BDCs

=== Strategic review ===
With the market failing to reflect support for its spin-off plan, including lack of support from its major shareholders, and a new activist shareholder that had become the company's largest shareholder, American Capital announced a full strategic review of all alternatives in November 2015. American Capital Mortgage Management was sold to American Capital Agency for $562 million on June 30, 2016. On January 3, 2017 American Capital was sold to Ares Capital. Both sales were for a total of $4.1 billion.

=== Shareholder returns from IPO to the sale ===
Investors who had bought American Capital at its August 29, 1997 IPO received a 14% compounded annual return including dividends (not reinvested) at the sale on January 3, 2017. better than the 10% return made by investors in shares of Berkshire Hathaway over the same period.

== Business units ==
American Capital built seven billion-dollar financial institutions over the years which included: American Capital, American Capital Equity I, European Capital, American Capital Agency, American Capital Mortgage, American Capital Equity III and American Capital Asset Management. American Capital took five companies public and invested over $33 billion in middle market companies to support their buyouts and growth. During the time American Capital was public, it owned and or controlled over 155 companies and invested in over 600 companies, including well-known companies such as AAMCO, Aeriform Corporation, Affordable Care, Algoma Group, Bumble Bee Foods, Bushnell Outdoor Products, CamelBak Products, Case Logic, Confluence Kayaks, Crosman Corporation, Cycle Gear, Electrolux, Explorer Pipeline, Euro-Pro, Evenflo Company, Gibson Guitars, Meadows of Wickenburg (addiction center), Nancy's Specialty Foods, New England Confectionery Company (NECCO), Parts Plus, Piper Aircraft, Potpourri, Riddell Sports Group, Ranpak, Rug Doctor and Service Experts. American Capital, Ltd.: American Capital (ACAS), both directly and through its asset management business, originated, underwrote and managed investments in middle market private equity, leveraged finance and structured products. It participated in management and employee buyouts either by providing mezzanine and senior debt financing for buyouts led by private equity firms or by providing capital directly to companies through a "One Stop Buyout" in which it funded senior debt, mezzanine and equity and was the controlling shareholder. American Capital and its affiliates invested from $10 million to $600 million per company in North America and €10 million to €300 million per company in Europe. At its peak, American Capital had over $100 billion of assets under management.

European Capital Limited: European Capital Limited (ECAS) was an externally managed private equity and mezzanine fund. The mission of European Capital was to provide in Europe mezzanine and senior debt financing for buyouts led by private equity firms or to provide capital directly to companies through a "One Stop Buyout" in which it funded senior debt, mezzanine and equity and was the controlling shareholder. Paris and London were the first of several offices.

American Capital Agency: American Capital Agency (AGNC) was formed as an agency real estate investment trust, REIT, which it externally managed and played an important role in the growth of American Capital Management and the re-appreciation of American Capital's balance sheet.

American Capital Mortgage Investment Corp: American Capital Mortgage Investment Corp (MTGE) was a hybrid mortgage REIT, raising $581 million.

American Capital Energy & Infrastructure: American Capital Energy & Infrastructure (ACEI) invested in global energy infrastructure assets. Paul Hanrahan, former CEO of AES Corporation, was appointed CEO, John Erickson was appointed its CFO and Richard Santoroski was appointed managing director.

American Capital Equity I: This was American Capital's second externally managed private equity fund.

American Capital Equity III: This was another externally managed private equity fund, managed by the American Capital Lower Middle Market Buyout group

American Capital Senior Floating: American Capital Senior Floating (ACSF), was an externally managed BDC investing predominately in senior secured debt of middle and large market U.S. companies and equity tranches of CLOs.

== Management ==
Name	Role	Years active
Malon Wilkus	Chairman and chief executive officer	1986 – 2017
John Erickson	President – Structured Finance/CFO	1998 - 2017
Ira Wager	President - European Private Finance	2001 - 2015
Gordon O'Brien	President – Specialty Finance & Operations	1998 - 2017
Brian Graff	President – Private Finance	2001 - 2017
Darin Winn	President	1998 - 2015
Roland Cline	Senior Vice President and Managing Director	1988 - 2017
Samuel Flax	Executive Vice President & General Counsel	2005 - 2017

== Financial results ==
American Capital went public in August 1997 at $15.00 per share, raising $155 million, making it the first private equity firm to go public in the United States. American Capital was sold on January 3, 2017, for $4.1 billion or $18.06 per share. Adjusted for a stock dividend paid in 2009, which had the effect of a stock split, the $18.06 per share selling price translates to approximately $23.50 a share when compared to its share price at the time of its IPO. In addition, during its time as a public company, American Capital paid $30.32 per share in dividends.

American Capital, Ltd. Financial Data
	Revenue (millions $)	Net Operating Income (NOI) (millions $)	Year-End Stock Price	Book Value (millions $)	Total Assets Under Mgmt. (millions $)	Dividend	Notes
1997	2.8	2.3	$18.13	151	151	$0.21	
1998	17	14.8	$17.25	153	270	$1.34	raised $30 million of debt capital
1999	33.4	24.7	$22.75	311	395	$1.74	raised $190 million in debt and equity capital
2000	70.1	44.7	$25.19	445	614	$2.35	raised $412 million of debt and equity in four offerings
2001	104.2	71.6	$28.35	640	910	$2.12	raised $237 million of debt and equity in three offerings
2002	147	102	$21.59	688	1400	$2.57	raised $436 million of debt and equity in four offerings
2003	206	141	$29.73	1200	2100	$2.79	raised $1.1 billion of debt and equity in six offerings
2004	336	220	$33.35	1900	3500	$1.88	raised $2.2 billion of debt and equity capital through nine offerings
2005	554	313	$36.21	2900	5700	$4.11	funds raised through European Capital - €750 million
2006	860	425	$46.26	4300	11300	$3.33	
2007	1200	594	$32.96	6400	17100	$3.72	
2008	1100	493	$3.24	3200	13400	$3.09	
2009	697	135	$2.44	2300	12500	$1.07	special stock and cash dividend, approximately 30% dilution of stock outstanding. Removed from S&P.
2010	600	204	$7.56	3700	22600	---	Dividends terminated in third quarter
2011	591	448	$6.73	4600	68000	---	
2012	646	397	$12.02	5100	93000	---	
2013	487	156	$15.64	5500	86000	---	
2014	471	117	$14.61	4800	73000	---	
2015	671	253	$13.79			---	
2016	---	---	$16.91			---	Merger with Ares Capital Corporation - January 3, 2017
