= Venture capital trust =

UK collective investment scheme

A venture capital trust or VCT is a tax efficient UK closed-end collective investment scheme designed to provide venture capital for small expanding companies, and income (in the form of dividend distributions) and/or capital gains for investors. VCTs are a form of publicly traded private equity, comparable to investment trusts in the UK or business development companies in the United States. They were introduced by the Conservative government in the Finance Act 1995 to encourage investment into new UK businesses.

The structure of a VCT is that of a public limited company on the London Stock Exchange. They invest in other companies which are usually not themselves listed, although VCTs can also invest in AIM companies, and some VCTs specialise in this area. VCTs tend to have a minority stake in the businesses they invest in, as opposed to private equity investing, where a majority stakeholder position is held.

== Tax reliefs ==
Tax reliefs are different for investors in new shares issued by VCTs and investors who purchase second-hand shares, for example on the stock market.

For any VCT shares, however acquired, the reliefs are

- exemption from income tax on dividends on ordinary shares in VCTs
- exemption from capital gains tax on disposal of shares in VCTs

=== Income tax relief ===
For new shares (those acquired by subscribing for a VCT share offer), the same reliefs are available, and in addition

- income tax relief at the rate of 20% on the amount subscribed for the shares (on or after 6 April 2026).

The rate of income tax relief has been changed over the years. The most recent change was the reduction from 30% to 20% in the November 2025 Budget.

This relief is available on investments up to £200,000 in a tax year (£100,000 before 6 April 2006), provided they continue to be held for 5 years (3 years for shares issued before 6 April 2006).

=== Capital gains tax ===
For shares issued before 6 April 2004, capital gains tax deferral was offered. Investors owing tax on the gains on the disposal of other assets within 12 months before or after the investment could postpone the CGT until the VCT shares were disposed of.

== Criteria ==
VCTs raise funds through issues of new shares. The managers of the VCT then have three years in which to invest this money. During this time they may hold the funds as cash or cash equivalents, or buy gilts, bonds and in some cases unit trusts / OEICs to attempt to maximize investor return.

Within three years of the share issue at least 80% of the VCT’s assets must be invested in "qualifying" holdings. These are defined as holdings of shares or securities, including loans of at least five years duration, in unquoted companies and those whose shares are traded on the alternative investment market (AIM). These companies must have a permanent establishment in the UK and carry out a "qualifying trade". The balance of up to 20% can be invested into areas such as government securities, gilts or blue-chip shares.

From 6 April 2026, VCTs may invest up to £10 million in a qualifying company, or £20 million for companies classified as “knowledge intensive (KI)”. Each individual investment cannot make up more than 15% of VCT assets. The gross assets of the company into which the VCT invests must not exceed £30 million based on pre-money valuation, and the company must have no more than 250 employees. If an investment is held in a company that becomes quoted on the London Stock Exchange then it can continue to be treated as a qualifying VCT investment for up to five years.

== Types ==
VCTs can usually be classified according to the following criteria:

- Generalist or Specialist: A generalist VCT invests primarily in unquoted companies from a diversity of industries; a specialist VCT focuses on a particular industry or sector, such as healthcare.
- AIM or hybrid: An AIM VCT is generalist in nature but invests predominantly in companies listed on London’s Alternative Investment Market (AIM). Some VCTs pursue a hybrid approach, with a blend of AIM and unlisted investments.

== Amount of money raised by VCTs ==
For the first nine years of their existence, Venture Capital Trusts raised an average of £181 million per tax year in aggregate. During this time, investors could claim 20% income tax relief on VCT subscriptions upfront, and also defer capital gains, thus avoiding capital gains tax.

In 2004 the amount of income tax relief was temporarily doubled to 40% by chancellor Gordon Brown, along with a doubling of the annual allowance to £200,000 per individual per tax year, while capital gains tax deferral was withdrawn. These changes helped VCT fundraising increase sharply to £505 million in 2004/05 and £779 million in 2005/06, the latter setting a record that would last 15 years.

After the level of income tax relief was reduced to 30% in April 2006, at which point the required minimum holding period was also increased to 5 years, the amounts raised by VCTs in the tax year did not exceed £500 million for a decade.

In 2018/19, when £731 million was raised, the trust that raised the largest total was Octopus Titan VCT, which reached £227.7 million, a record for a VCT share offer.

In 2019/20, the amount invested in VCTs dropped to £619 million during a year in which the UK left the European Union and the COVID-19 pandemic caused widespread interruption to business in the UK.

In 2020/21 £685 million was raised, 11% higher than the previous year, although the overall capacity of VCT share offers was 7.5% lower, reflecting uncertainty over the economic impact of the COVID-19 pandemic.

In 2021/22 a new high of £1.13 billion was raised, of which £170 million by AIM VCTs, also the highest on record. The year was notable for fast selling offers including Mobeus VCTs, which raised £35 million within a day of opening.

In 2022/23 the backdrop in the UK economy was one of economic uncertainty, with high inflation, political instability and the ongoing Russian invasion of Ukraine. £1.08 billion was raised, 5% lower than the year before. A new record was set for the largest individual VCT offer, with Octopus Titan VCT raising £237 million. AIM VCTs raised only £85 million, half the total of the previous year.

In 2023/24 funds raised fell to £882 million. Around 66% of the difference is accounted for by the £131 million less raised by a single trust, Octopus Titan VCT, which stopped raising funds in 2024. The total increased slightly to £895 million in 2024/25, then to £918 million in 2026/27 – the third highest year on record..

The total amounts raised by VCTs per tax year are as follows:

Tax year	Raised (£ million)	Change from previous year	Income tax relief	Investment allowance	Minimum hold period	CGT deferral
2025/26	918	2.5%	30%	£200,000	5 years	No
2024/25	895	1.2%	30%	£200,000	5 years	No
2023/24	882	-18.2%	30%	£200,000	5 years	No
2022/23	1,078	-4.9%	30%	£200,000	5 years	No
2021/22	1,133	65.4%	30%	£200,000	5 years	No
2020/21	685	10.7%	30%	£200,000	5 years	No
2019/20	619	-15.3%	30%	£200,000	5 years	No
2018/19	731	0.4%	30%	£200,000	5 years	No
2017/18	728	34.3%	30%	£200,000	5 years	No
2016/17	542	18.3%	30%	£200,000	5 years	No
2015/16	457	6.8%	30%	£200,000	5 years	No
2014/15	429	2.1%	30%	£200,000	5 years	No
2013/14	420	56.1%	30%	£200,000	5 years	No
2012/13	269	0.8%	30%	£200,000	5 years	No
2011/12	267	-24.6%	30%	£200,000	5 years	No
2010/11	354	4.7%	30%	£200,000	5 years	No
2009/10	338	119.5%	30%	£200,000	5 years	No
2008/09	154	-29.7%	30%	£200,000	5 years	No
2007/08	220	-18.0%	30%	£200,000	5 years	No
2006/07	267	-65.7%	30%	£200,000	5 years	No
2005/06	779	54.3%	40%	£100,000	3 years	No
2004/05	505	910.0%	40%	£100,000	3 years	No
2003/04	50	-23.1%	20%	£100,000	3 years	Yes
2002/03	65	-48.0%	20%	£100,000	3 years	Yes
2001/02	125	-71.1%	20%	£100,000	3 years	Yes
2000/01	433	60.4%	20%	£100,000	5 years	Yes
1999/00	270	63.6%	20%	£100,000	5 years	Yes
1998/99	165	-13.2%	20%	£100,000	5 years	Yes
1997/98	190	11.8%	20%	£100,000	5 years	Yes
1996/97	170	6.3%	20%	£100,000	5 years	Yes
1995/96	160	-	20%	£100,000	5 years	Yes

== See also ==
- Business development company
- Investment trust
- Collective investment scheme
- Enterprise investment scheme
- Publicly traded private equity
