= Miami Dolphins =

NFL team in Miami Gardens, Florida

- Current season
Logo	Wordmark
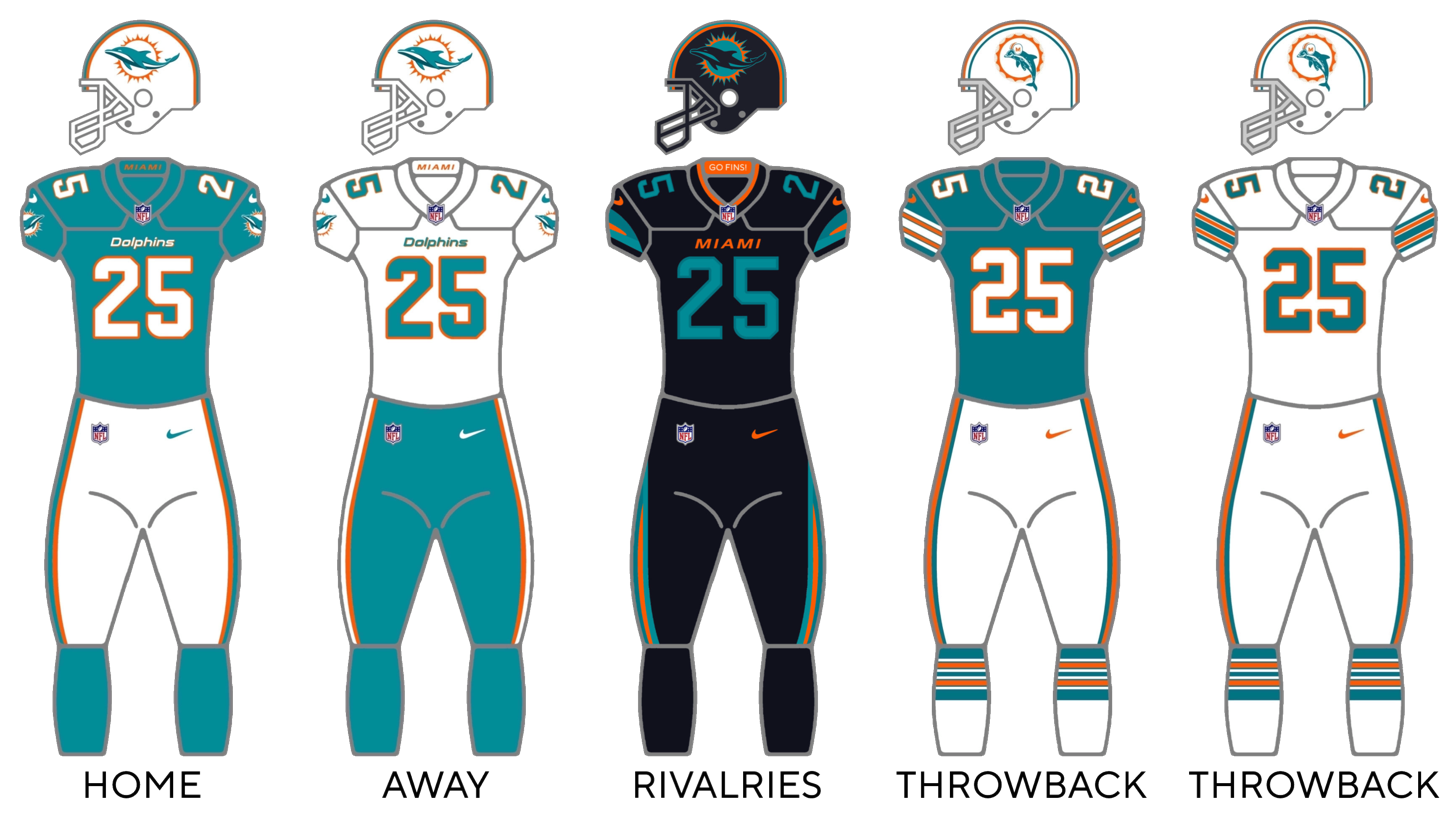
- Uniforms

General information
- Founded: August 16, 1965; 61 years ago
- Stadium: Hard Rock Stadium; Miami Gardens, Florida
- Headquartered: Baptist Health Training Complex; Miami Gardens, Florida
- Colors: Aqua, orange, white, marine blue
- Fight song: "Miami Dolphins No. 1"
- Mascot: T. D.
- Website: miamidolphins.com

Personnel
- Owner: Stephen Ross
- CEO: Daniel Sillman
- General manager: Jon-Eric Sullivan
- Head coach: Jeff Hafley

Nicknames
- The Phins; No Name Defense (1972 defense); Killer Bees (1982 defense)

Team history
- Miami Dolphins (1966–present)

Home fields
- Miami Orange Bowl (1966–1986); Hard Rock Stadium (1987–present)

League / conference affiliations
- American Football League (1966–1969): Eastern Division (1966–1969); National Football League (1970–present): American Football Conference (1970–present); AFC East (1970–present)

Championships
- Super Bowl championships: 2 1972 (VII), 1973 (VIII)
- Conference championships: 5: AFC: 1971, 1972, 1973, 1982, 1984
- Division championships: 13: AFC East: 1971, 1972, 1973, 1974, 1979, 1981, 1983, 1984, 1985, 1992, 1994, 2000, 2008

Playoff appearances (25)
- NFL: 1970, 1971, 1972, 1973, 1974, 1978, 1979, 1981, 1982, 1983, 1984, 1985, 1990, 1992, 1994, 1995, 1997, 1998, 1999, 2000, 2001, 2008, 2016, 2022, 2023

Owners
- Joe Robbie (1966–1990); Wayne Huizenga (1990–2009); Stephen M. Ross (2009–present)

The Miami Dolphins are a professional American football team based in the Miami metropolitan area. The Dolphins compete in the National Football League (NFL) as a member of the American Football Conference (AFC) East division. The team plays its home games at Hard Rock Stadium in Miami Gardens, Florida, a northern suburb of Miami. The team is owned by Stephen M. Ross. The Dolphins are the oldest professional sports team in Florida. Of the four AFC East teams, the Dolphins are the only team in the division that was not a charter member of the American Football League (AFL). The Dolphins were also one of the first professional football teams in the southeast, along with the Atlanta Falcons.

The Dolphins were founded by Joe Robbie, an attorney and politician, and Danny Thomas, an actor and comedian. They began play in the AFL in 1966. The region had not had a professional football team since the days of the Miami Seahawks, who played in the All-America Football Conference in 1946, before becoming the first incarnation of the Baltimore Colts. For the first few years, the Dolphins' full-time training camp and practice facilities were at Saint Andrew's School, a private, boys boarding prep school in Boca Raton. Miami joined the NFL as a result of the 1970 AFL–NFL merger.

The team played in its first Super Bowl in Super Bowl VI, losing to the Dallas Cowboys, 24–3. The following year, the Dolphins completed a perfect season, culminating in a victory in Super Bowl VII. The Dolphins then repeated as champions by winning Super Bowl VIII, becoming the first team to appear in three consecutive Super Bowls, and the second team (the first AFL/AFC team) to win back-to-back championships. Miami later appeared in Super Bowl XVII and Super Bowl XIX, losing both games.

For most of their early history, the Dolphins were coached by Don Shula, the most successful head coach in professional football history in terms of total games won. Under Shula, the Dolphins posted losing records in only two of his 26 seasons as the head coach. During the period spanning 1983 to the end of 1999, quarterback Dan Marino became one of the most prolific passers in NFL history, breaking numerous league passing records. Marino led the Dolphins to five division titles, 10 playoff appearances, and an appearance in Super Bowl XIX before retiring following the 1999 season.

Since Marino's retirement, they have experienced mediocre levels of success and have just six playoff appearances (2000, 2001, 2008, 2016, 2022, and 2023) and two division titles (2000 and 2008) with one playoff win. They currently have the longest postseason win drought in the NFL, with their most recent playoff win coming in the 2000 season.

In December 2024, under Ross' ownership, the Dolphins became one of the first teams in NFL history to sell part of their team to outside private equity investors. 13% of the Dolphins franchise was sold at a valuation of $8.1 billion, including 10% to the American investment group Ares Management.

== History ==
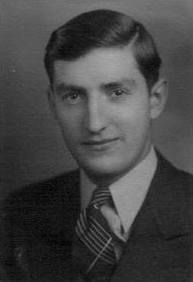
Joe Robbie, founder and former principal owner of the Dolphins (1966–1990)

The Miami Dolphins joined the American Football League (AFL) when an expansion franchise was awarded to lawyer Joseph Robbie and actor Danny Thomas in 1965 for $7.5 million, although Thomas would eventually sell his stake in the team to Robbie. During the summer of 1966, the Dolphins' training camp was in St. Pete Beach with practices in August at Boca Ciega High School in Gulfport.

=== Don Shula years (1970–1995) ===
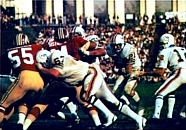
The Dolphins finished their perfect 1972 season by defeating the Redskins in Super Bowl VII.

The Dolphins were the worst team with a 15–39–2 record in their first four seasons under head coach George Wilson, before Don Shula was hired as head coach. Shula was a Paul Brown disciple who had been lured from the Baltimore Colts, after losing Super Bowl III two seasons earlier to the AFL's New York Jets, and finishing 8–5–1 the following season. Shula got his first NFL coaching job from then-Detroit head coach George Wilson, who hired him as the defensive coordinator. The AFL merged with the NFL in 1970, and the Dolphins were assigned to the AFC East division in the NFL's new American Football Conference.

For the rest of the 20th century, the Shula-led Dolphins emerged as one of the most dominant teams in the NFL, with only two losing seasons between 1970 and 1999. They were extremely successful in the 1970s, completing the first complete perfect season in NFL history by finishing with a 14–0 regular-season record in 1972 and winning the Super Bowl that year. It was the first of two consecutive Super Bowl wins and one of three appearances in a row. The 1980s and 1990s were also moderately successful. The early 80s teams made two Super Bowls despite losing both times and saw the emergence of future Hall of Fame quarterback Dan Marino, who went on to break numerous NFL passing records, holding many of them until the late 2000s. After winning every game against the division rival Buffalo Bills in the 1970s, the two teams gradually developed a competitive rivalry in the 80s and 90s, often competing for AFC supremacy when Jim Kelly emerged as the quarterback for the Bills. The Dolphins have also maintained a strong rivalry with the New York Jets throughout much of their history.

After Marino and Shula retired and with the rise of Tom Brady and the New England Patriots, the Dolphins suffered a decline in the 2000s and 2010s. During that time, the team's level of play was largely described as mediocre. They have only made the playoffs four times since Marino's retirement and have usually not been able to find a quarterback to replace him.

=== Jimmy Johnson years (1996–1999) ===
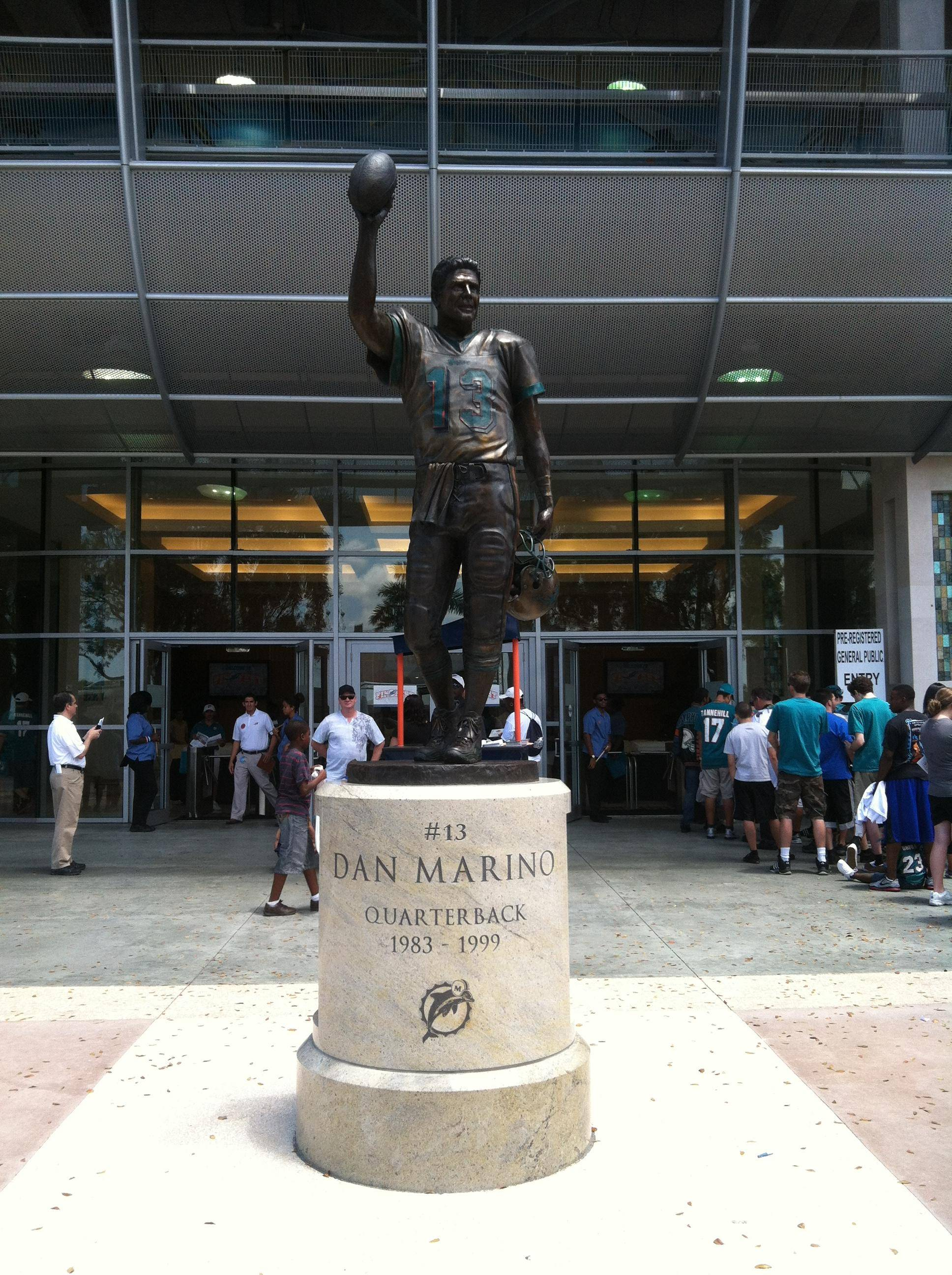
A life sized bronzed statue of Dan Marino outside of Hard Rock Stadium.

Jimmy Johnson was hired to replace Shula prior to the 1996 season. In his first season at the helm, he led the team to an 8–8 record and missed the postseason. In the 1997, the team improved to a 9–7 mark and made the postseason. The team saw their season end in the Wild Card Round with a 17–3 loss to the New England Patriots. In the 1998 season, the team went 10–6 and made the postseason. The Dolphins defeated the Bills 24–17 in the Wild Card Round before falling to the Denver Broncos 38–3 in the Divisional Round. In the 1999 season, the Dolphins went 9–7 and made the postseason. The team defeated the Seattle Seahawks 20–17 in the Wild Card Round before falling 62–7 to the Jacksonville Jaguars in what would be Marino's final game. Johnson resigned following the season.

=== Mediocrity and playoff win drought (2000−present) ===
Going into the 2000 season, the Dolphins named Dave Wannstedt as head coach. In his first season with the Dolphins, he led the team to an 11–5 record and an AFC East title. The team defeated the Indianapolis Colts 23–17 in the Wild Card Round before losing 27–0 to the Oakland Raiders in the Divisional Round. The Dolphins finished with winning records over the next three seasons, though only qualified for the playoffs as a wild card in 2001, where they lost to the Baltimore Ravens 20–3 in the Wild Card Round. Following a 1–8 start to the 2004 season, Wannstedt resigned. Interim head coach Jim Bates finished out the year with a 3–4 mark.

Nick Saban coached the Dolphins in the 2005 and 2006 seasons. He went 9–7 and 6–10 in those two seasons, respectively, missing the playoffs in both. Saban resigned following the latter to coach college football at Alabama. The Dolphins hired Cam Cameron in the 2007 off-season. Cameron was fired after just a single season, in which the Dolphins finished with a league- and franchise-worst 1−15 record.

Tony Sparano was named head coach of the Dolphins prior to the 2008 season. The Dolphins drafted offensive tackle Jake Long with the first-overall pick in the 2008 draft. Sparano led the team to an 11–5 record and an AFC East title. During the season, they became the second team in NFL history to make a 10-game improvement over the previous season. Their success that season was notably tied to the use of the gimmick Wildcat offense, which they introduced against the New England Patriots during Week 3. They finished the season atop the AFC East; their success proved to be an outlier, as it remains their most recent division title as of 2026. The team's season ended with a 27–9 loss to the Baltimore Ravens in the Wild Card Round. Sparano's Dolphins finished with losing records the following two seasons, and after a 4−9 start in 2011, he was fired. Todd Bowles was named as the interim coach to close out the season.

Prior to the 2012 season, the team hired Joe Philbin as head coach. Over each of his first three full seasons in the role, the Dolphins finished with mediocre records and missed the playoffs. After a 1–3 start to the 2015 season, Philbin was fired. Dan Campbell was named as interim coach and finished the year with a 5–7 mark. Adam Gase was named head coach during the 2016 off-season. He led the team to a 10–6 record and a Wild Card round berth, which resulted in a 30−12 loss to the Pittsburgh Steelers. After two losing seasons in 2017 and 2018, Gase was fired.

Prior to the 2019 season, the Dolphins hired Brian Flores as head coach. He led the team to a 5–11 record in the 2019 season. The team drafted Alabama quarterback Tua Tagovailoa in the first round of the 2020 NFL draft. The Dolphins finished with winning records in both of Tagovailoa's first two seasons, though narrowly missed the postseason both years. Flores was then fired. In the 2022 off-season, Mike McDaniel was hired as head coach. In both of his first two seasons, McDnaiel led the Dolphins to winning records and postseason berths, though the Dolphins lost in the Wild Card round both years. In years three and four under McDaniel, the Dolphins finished with losing records and missed the playoffs, leading to his firing after the 2025 season.

Jeff Hafley succeeded McDaniel as head coach, being hired in the 2026 off-season. With their last postseason win coming in 2000, the Dolphins entered the Hafley era with the longest postseason win drought among the four major professional sports leagues in the United States and Canada.

== Championships ==
=== Super Bowl championships ===
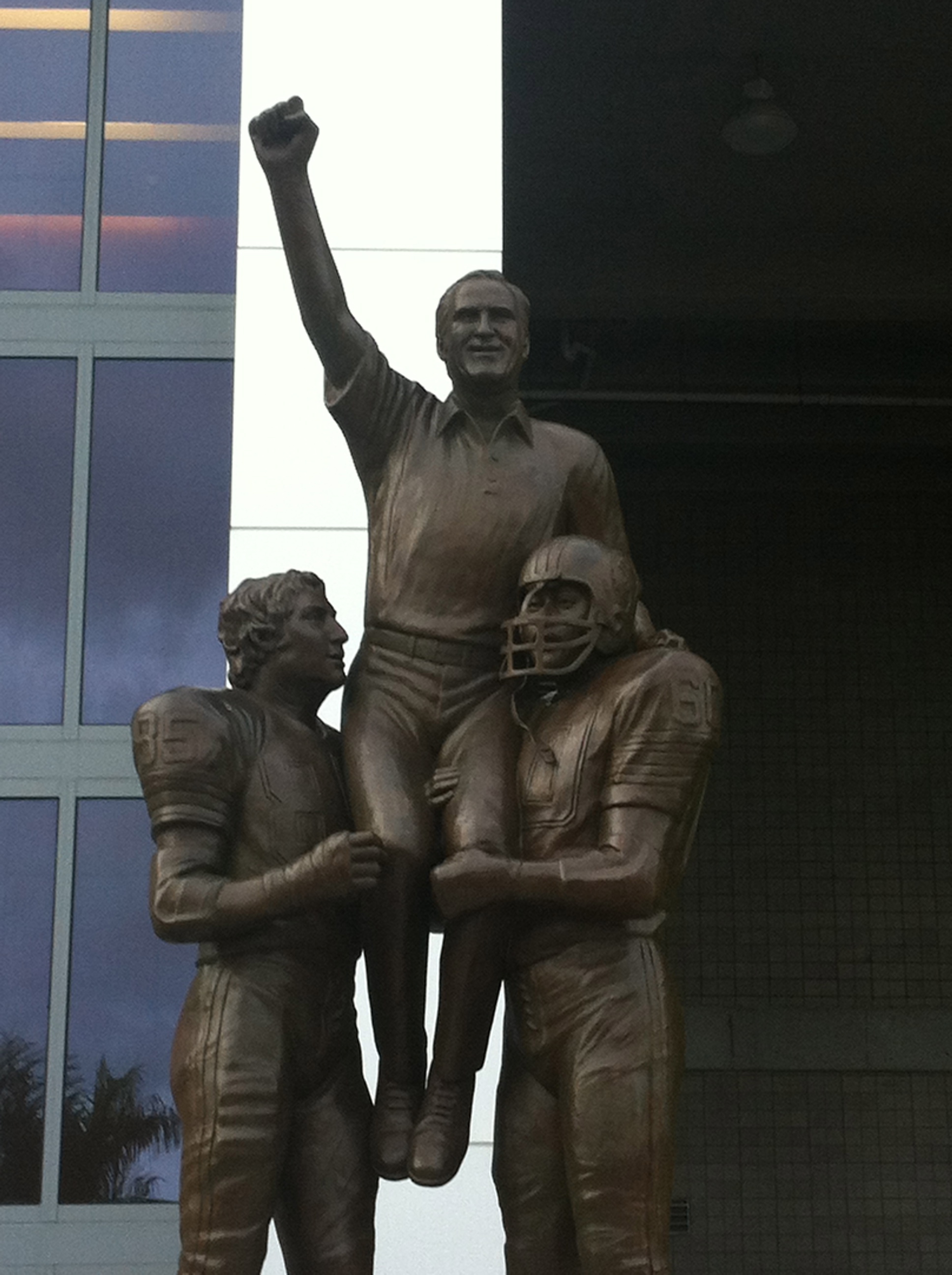
A statue of coach Don Shula outside of Hard Rock Stadium

Season	Coach	Super Bowl	Location	Opponent	Score	Record
1972	Don Shula	VII	Los Angeles Memorial Coliseum (Los Angeles)	Washington Redskins	14–7	17–0
1973	Don Shula	VIII	Rice Stadium (Houston)	Minnesota Vikings	24–7	15–2
Total Super Bowls won:						2

=== AFC championships ===
Season	Coach	Location	Opponent	Score	Record
1971	Don Shula	Orange Bowl (Miami)	Baltimore Colts	21–0	12–4–1
1972	Don Shula	Three Rivers Stadium (Pittsburgh)	Pittsburgh Steelers	21–17	17–0
1973	Don Shula	Orange Bowl (Miami)	Oakland Raiders	27–10	15–2
1982	Don Shula	Orange Bowl (Miami)	New York Jets	14–0	10–3
1984	Don Shula	Orange Bowl (Miami)	Pittsburgh Steelers	45–28	16–3
Total AFC Championships won:					5

== Rivalries ==
=== Divisional ===
==== New England Patriots ====
The Dolphins dominated the New England Patriots during the 1970s and the 1990s, but there were some notable moments as well, including a 1982 game now known as the Snowplow Game. Fortunes changed when Tom Brady became the franchise quarterback for the Patriots, and during his tenure with the Patriots, New England dominated the AFC, especially the AFC East, winning 16 of 17 division titles between 2003 and 2019, with the Dolphins winning the only non-Patriots division title in that time frame when Brady was out due to injury. Miami posed the biggest divisional challenge to the Brady-led Patriots, however, winning more games against them than the Bills or Jets did during that era.

Notable wins over New England by the Dolphins include the Miracle in Miami, which involved a dramatic last-minute game-winning touchdown that paralleled "The Night that Courage Wore Orange", where in 2004, the Dolphins, at 2–11, upset the defending Super Bowl champion Patriots 28–29, and handed them the second of their 2 losses that season. The rivalry briefly intensified in 2005 when Nick Saban, Bill Belichick's former Browns defensive coordinator was hired as their new head coach and when Saban nearly signed quarterback Drew Brees, as well as in 2008, when the two teams battled for the AFC East division title. Miami and New England are also the only two franchises to have posted undefeated regular-season records since the NFL-AFL merger, with Miami going 14–0 in 1972 and New England going 16–0 in 2007. Only the 1972 Dolphins were able to win the Super Bowl. As of the 2024 season, the Dolphins lead the all-time series 64–55.

==== Buffalo Bills ====
The Dolphins and the Buffalo Bills have a long-standing rivalry, as there are stark characteristic differences between the cities of Miami and Buffalo, especially in climate and culture. The rivalry was extremely lopsided in favor of Miami during the 1970s, as the Dolphins won all 20 games against the Bills during that decade. Fortunes changed in the 1980s and 1990s when Jim Kelly became the Bills' starting quarterback. Though both teams were extremely dominant during that period, the Bills ultimately held the edge and dominated the Dolphins during their four playoff matchups in the 1990s, with the Dolphins' only playoff win coming after Kelly's retirement. With the rise of Tom Brady and the Patriots during the 2000s and the retirements of Kelly and Dolphins quarterback Dan Marino, the Bills-Dolphins rivalry faded in relevance, but remains somewhat intense to this day. Some former Dolphins have gone to play for the Bills as well, most notably Dan Carpenter, Chris Hogan, and Charles Clay.

In the 2020s, the rivalry intensified again, with Dolphins quarterback Tua Tagovailoa, drafted in 2020, leading a resurgent Dolphins team against the Josh Allen-led Bills, who had gained a streak of success after Brady's departure from the Patriots and the division. Though Allen's career record against Miami currently stands at 13–2, Tagovailoa led the Dolphins to their first win over Bills in 8 games in 2022, and the Dolphins played the Bills tightly in the teams' two other meetings that year despite losing both, including the playoffs. As of the 2024 season, the Dolphins lead the all-time series 62–60–1.

==== New York Jets ====
The New York Jets are perhaps Miami's most bitter rivals. Dolphins fans despise the Jets due to the sheer amount of New York City transplants who have moved to South Florida and the Jets' misplaced cocky demeanor. Just as the Bills-Dolphins rivalry is motivated by differences, the Dolphins-Jets series is also notable for the differences between New York and Miami. Unlike the former, this rivalry has been more consistent over the years. Some of the more memorable moments in this rivalry include Dan Marino's fake spike, Vinny Testaverde leading the Jets to a notable comeback on Monday Night Football, and former Jets quarterback Chad Pennington signing with the Dolphins and leading them to a divisional title. The two teams have also played in the 1982 AFC Championship, with Miami winning to face the Washington Redskins in Super Bowl XVII. As of the 2024 season, the Dolphins lead the all-time series 61–57–1.

=== Conference ===
==== Jacksonville Jaguars ====
The Dolphins have taken part in a minor rivalry with the Jacksonville Jaguars as both teams are the only two AFC franchises located in Florida. The two teams first met during the 1998 NFL season on a Monday Night Football matchup. Both teams later met in the 1999 AFC Divisional Round in what would ultimately be the final career game for Dolphins' hall-of-fame quarterback Dan Marino. The Dolphins entered the game as heavy underdogs as they had finished the 1999 season 9–7, securing the lowest wild card berth. Meanwhile, the Jaguars had boasted an impressive 14–2 campaign under pro-bowl quarterback Mark Brunell, culminating in the Jaguars destroying Miami in a 62–7 blowout loss. The Jaguars managed an improbable upset victory during the 2021 Season as the team had declined severely under controversial head coach Urban Meyer. Despite this, the Jaguars managed a comeback victory against the Dolphins in London during week 6. Miami leads the series 6–5 all time, though the Jaguars lead 1–0 in the postseason.

==== Indianapolis Colts ====
When the then-Baltimore Colts were inserted into the AFC East following the AFL/NFL merger, they sparked a heated rivalry with the Dolphins, as a controversy involving the hiring of former Colts coach Don Shula forced Miami to forfeit a first-round draft pick. The Dolphins and Colts faced off several times in the AFC playoffs during the 1970s, including the AFC championship game leading up to Super Bowl VI, which the Dolphins lost to the Dallas Cowboys. The rivalry cooled down in the 1980s after the Colts struggled and moved to Indianapolis, but heated up once again in the late 90s until the Colts were reassigned into the AFC South as a result of the 2002 realignment of the NFL's divisions. As of 2024, the Dolphins lead the all-time series 48–29.

=== Interconference ===
==== Tampa Bay Buccaneers ====
Since the founding of the Tampa Bay Buccaneers in 1976, the Dolphins and Buccaneers have shared a mellow in-state rivalry and were the only two teams in Florida until the Jacksonville Jaguars joined the NFL in 1995. As of the 2023 season, the Buccaneers lead the all-time series 7–5.

=== Historic ===
==== Kansas City Chiefs ====
The Dolphins won a notable pair of games against the Kansas City Chiefs, defeating them in "The Longest Game", the final game in Municipal Stadium, and then the first regular season game at Arrowhead Stadium in 1972. As of the 2023 season, the Chiefs lead the all-time series 17–16.

==== Oakland Raiders, San Diego Chargers, Pittsburgh Steelers ====
The Dolphins also share historic rivalries with other AFC teams such as the Las Vegas Raiders, Los Angeles Chargers, and Pittsburgh Steelers, stemming from often competing against these teams in the playoffs during the Don Shula era. As of the 2023 season, the Raiders lead the all-time series 21–20–1.

== Facilities ==
=== Stadiums ===
The Dolphins originally played all home games in the Orange Bowl in Miami. They moved to the new Joe Robbie Stadium after the 1986 season. From 1993 to 2011, the Dolphins shared the stadium with Major League Baseball's Florida Marlins (now known as the Miami Marlins). The venue has had multiple naming rights deals since 1996, carrying the names Pro Player Stadium, Dolphins Stadium, Dolphin Stadium, LandShark Stadium, Sun Life Stadium, New Miami Stadium and, as of August 2016, Hard Rock Stadium. The facility is located in Miami Gardens, a suburb of Miami located approximately 15 miles (24 km) north of downtown Miami. The Miami Dolphins share Hard Rock Stadium with the NCAA Miami Hurricanes. The 2015–2016 season was the first season in the newly renovated Hard Rock Stadium. The Dolphins spent more than two years and over $400 million on a major overhaul to Hard Rock Stadium. Every seat was replaced and the lower-level seats were moved closer to the field. There are roughly 10,000 fewer seats.

==== Orange Bowl ====
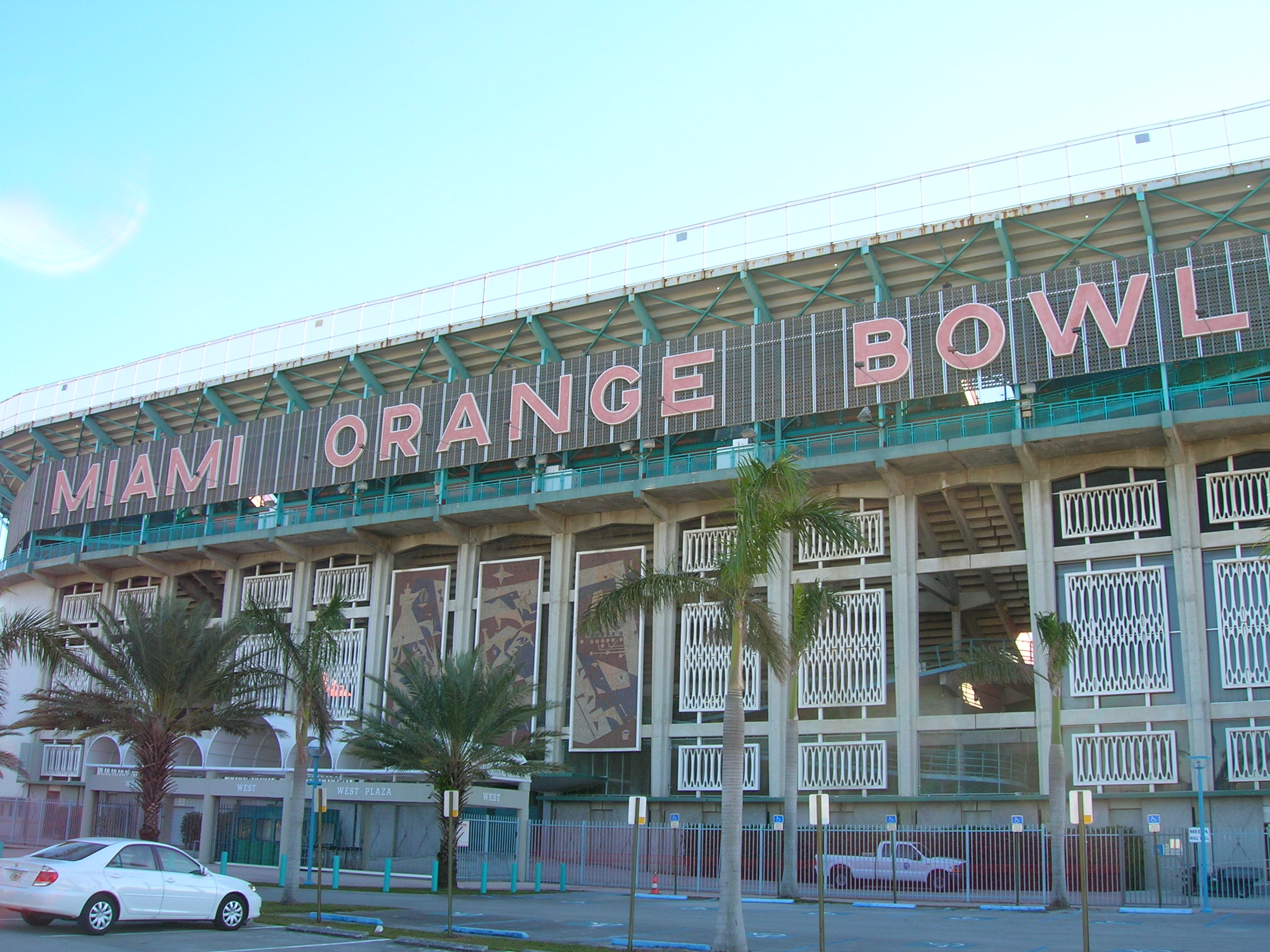
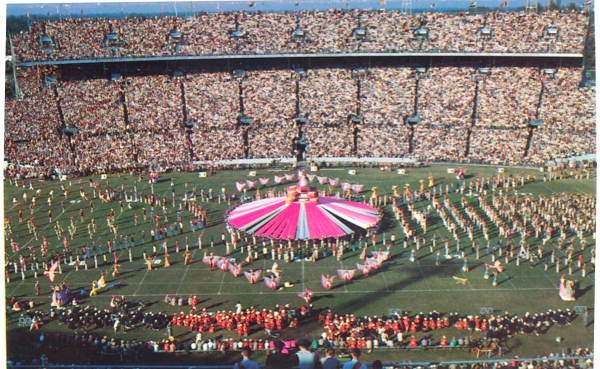
Exterior (left) and interior (right) of the Miami Orange Bowl where the Dolphins played from 1966 to 1986.

==== Hard Rock Stadium ====
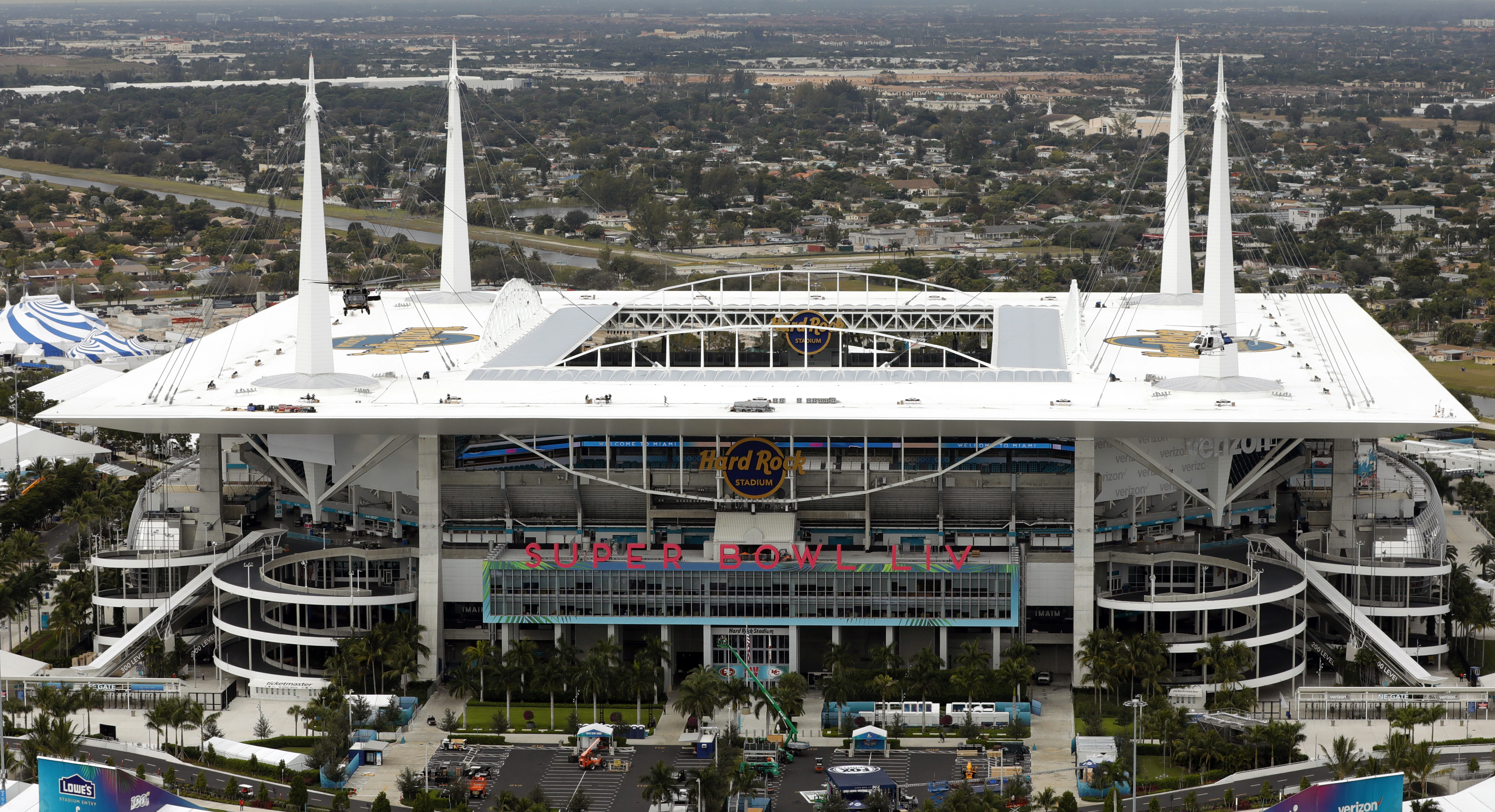
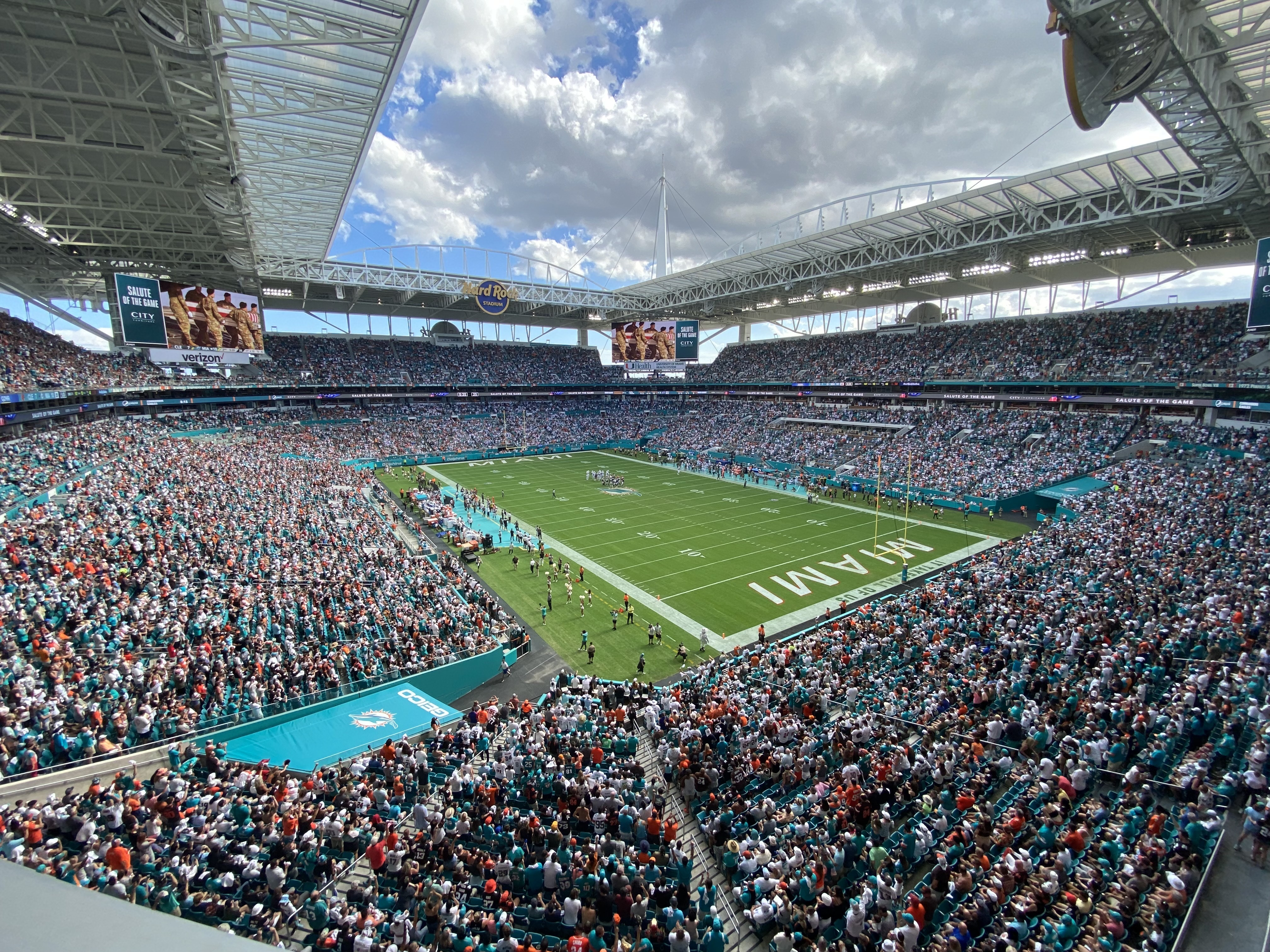
Exterior (left) and interior (right) of Hard Rock Stadium where the Dolphins have played since 1987.

=== Training ===
St. Petersburg Beach hosted the Dolphins' first training camp in 1966. St. Andrew's School in Boca Raton hosted training camp in the late 1960s. The Dolphins subsequently trained in Miami Gardens at Biscayne College, later renamed St. Thomas University, from 1970 until 1993. In 1993, the Dolphins opened the Miami Dolphins Training Facility at Nova Southeastern University in Davie. In 2006, the facility added a domed field that allows the team to practice during thunderstorms which are common in the area during the summer.

In 2021, the Dolphins opened a new $135 million training facility, dubbed the Baptist Health Training Complex, the Dolphins practice in. The complex is located next to Hard Rock Stadium in Miami Gardens.

== Franchise information ==
=== Logos and uniforms ===
==== Leaping dolphin (1966–2012) ====
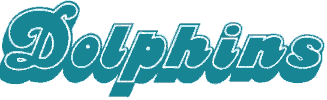
Miami's wordmark logo (1980–1996)

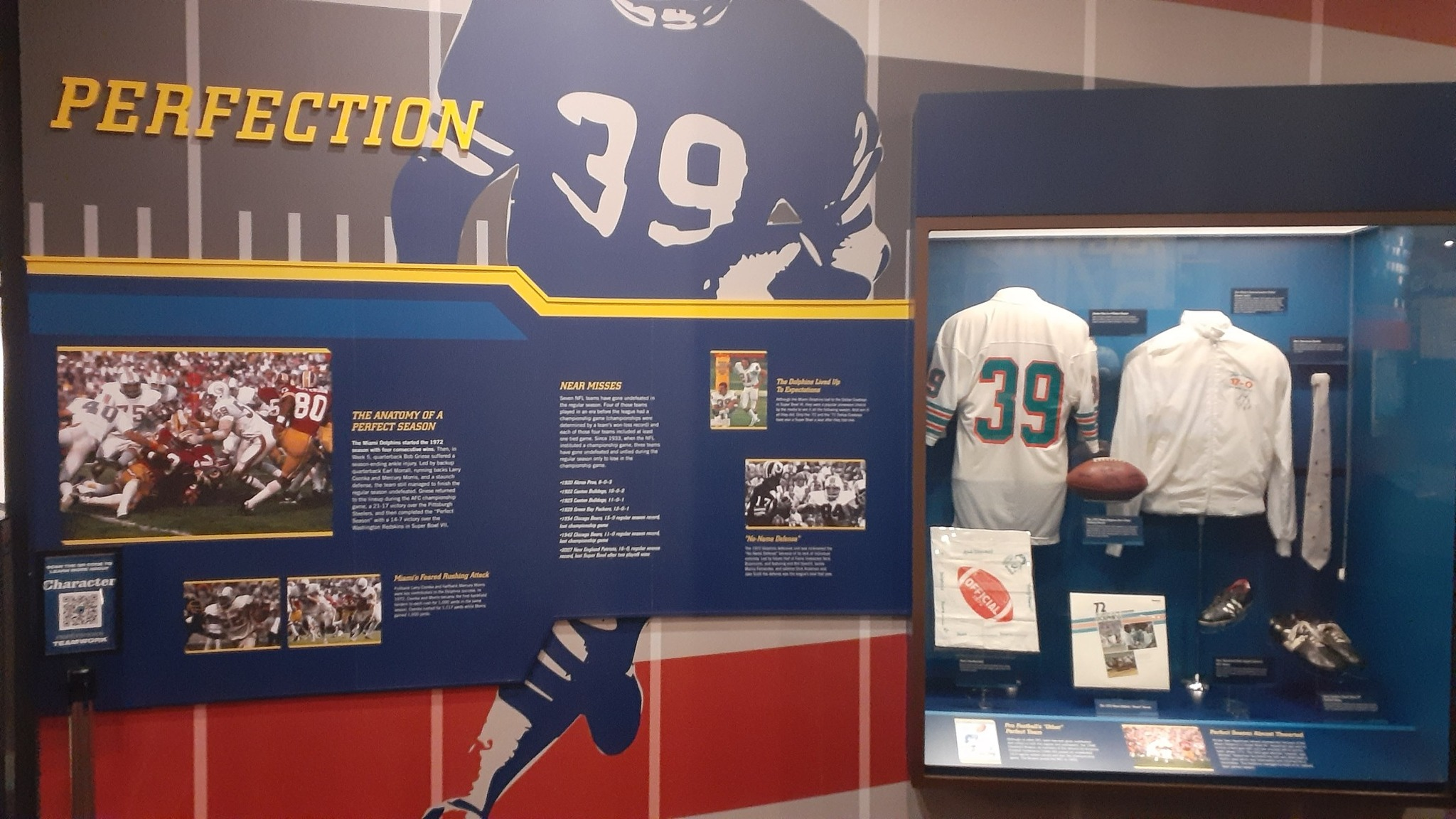
The "Perfection Exhibit" honoring the 1972 17–0 Undefeated Miami Dolphins at the Pro Football Hall of Fame.

The Dolphins logo and uniforms remained fairly consistent from the team's founding through 2012. The team's colors were originally aqua and coral, with the coral color paying tribute to the Miami Seahawks and to the many natural coral reefs in Biscayne Bay. The team's original logo consisted of a sunburst with a leaping dolphin wearing a football helmet bearing the letter M. At their debut in 1966, a lighter & brighter orange was used instead of the deep coral color. The dolphin's head was near the center of the sunburst. In the 1967 season, the dolphin was centered on the sunburst, but it reverted to the original placement between 1968 and 1973. By 1974, the dolphin's body was centered on the sunburst in a slightly smaller logo than the 1967 version. The uniforms featured white pants with aqua and orange stripes, paired with either a white or aqua jersey. On the white jersey, aqua block numbers and names were outlined in orange, with aqua and orange sleeve stripes. Starting with the 1972 perfect season, these uniforms were used as the primary uniforms for road games and daytime home games, due to the extreme heat of South Florida. The team also had an aqua jersey used mainly for night home games or road games in which the opponent chose to wear white. The aqua jersey featured white block numbers and names with an orange outline, and orange and white sleeve stripes.

An update was given to the logo in 1997 – the sunburst was simplified and the dolphin was darkened and given a more serious game-face expression. The uniforms remained the same; however, a different block number font was used and navy drop shadows were added.

On very rare occasions, an orange jersey was used for primetime games. The uniforms essentially swapped the location of orange and aqua from the aqua jersey. The orange jersey was first used on a Sunday night in 2003 against Washington, a Dolphin win. In 2004, the orange jersey was brought back for a Monday Night Football match pitting the 2–11 Dolphins against the 12–1 defending champion New England Patriots. The Dolphins scored a huge upset win after trailing by 11 points with less than 5 minutes remaining. Due to the unusual orange jerseys, the game has become known within some Dolphin circles as "The Night That Courage Wore Orange". The orange jerseys were used for a 2009 Monday night win against the New York Jets. However, the Dolphins would lose a 2010 Sunday night matchup with the Jets, their first loss in orange, and the orange jerseys in the original style would not be worn again.

In 2009, the Dolphins switched to black shoes for the first time since the early 1970s glory days, following a recent trend among NFL teams. However, by 2011, they returned to wearing white shoes.

The Dolphins' final game in the original style uniforms with block numbers and the iconic leaping dolphin logo was the final game of the 2012 season, a 28–0 shutout loss to the New England Patriots in Foxboro. The white jerseys were worn for the game, and as rumors of a new look had been swirling, many fans watching knew that it would likely be the last time their team would wear the leaping dolphin logo.

==== Stylized swimming dolphin (2013–present) ====
A new logo and new uniforms were unveiled shortly before the 2013 NFL draft. The new logo features a stylized aqua dolphin swimming in front of a heavily modified version of the orange sunburst. The dolphin in the logo is more vague and artistic, and is not wearing a helmet as it is merely a silhouette of a dolphin cast in aqua and navy.

Navy was incorporated as featured color for the first time, with orange becoming greatly de-emphasized. The uniforms feature both white pants and aqua pants, with a white or aqua jersey. The Dolphins continue to wear white at home, just as they had with the previous uniforms, with aqua being used for primetime home games. The white jersey features aqua numbers and names in a unique custom font, with orange and navy outlines on the numbers; however, the names only use navy as an outline color. The aqua jerseys use white numbers with an orange and aqua outline, and white names with a navy outline. The helmets are white with a white facemask, just like the final years of the previous look; however, navy is a prominent color on the helmet stripe, joining aqua and a de-emphasized orange. Both jerseys have large "Dolphins" text above the numbers, written in the team's new script. The pants are either aqua or white, and contain no markings other than a small team wordmark.

In 2018, the team made some slight modifications to the logo and uniform set: The shades of orange and aqua were tweaked, and navy blue was removed from the color scheme, only remaining on the logo.

==== Throwback uniforms ====
In 2015, the Dolphins brought back their 1970s aqua uniforms for a few select games. Four years later, they brought back a white version from the same era as a second alternate uniform. The aqua throwbacks were worn during the now-famous 2018 Miracle in Miami play against the Patriots.

==== Color Rush uniform ====
On September 29, 2016, the Dolphins debuted their new Color Rush uniform in a Thursday Night Football game against the Cincinnati Bengals. The all-orange uniform marked the first time since 2010 that the Dolphins wore an orange uniform. However, the set was only used for that game as the Dolphins immediately retired the uniform soon after.

In later years, the Dolphins wore similar all-aqua or all-white uniforms in select games as the NFL gradually relaxed its rules regarding hosiery.

==== Rivalries uniform ====
On August 28, 2025, the Dolphins released a new "Rivalries" uniform that would be worn at home against each of their AFC East opponents over a three-year span. The design featured a dark blue base with aqua numbers and orange trim, along with a "MIAMI" wordmark in orange with aqua drop shadows. The helmet is dark blue with aqua and orange striping, and featured a modified "swimming dolphin" logo without white elements.

=== Fight song ===
The song was written and composed by Lee Ofman, and has similar instrumentation and lyrics to the fight song of the Houston Oilers. Ofman approached the Dolphins with it before the 1972 season because he wanted music to inspire his favorite team. The fight song would soon serve as a good luck charm for the Dolphins that season. The Dolphins became the first team in NFL history to record an undefeated season, going 17–0 en route to victory over the Washington Redskins in Super Bowl VII. The following season, Miami posted an equally impressive 15–2 record and capped the season with another title, defeating the Minnesota Vikings in Super Bowl VIII. The back-to-back championship runs, coupled with the popularity of the fight song amongst Dolphins fans, have ensured the song's longevity. The Dolphins revealed a new fight song by T-Pain and Jimmy Buffett featuring Pitbull on August 7, 2009, which was introduced for the 2009 NFL season. The fight song was played during the preseason home opener against the Jacksonville Jaguars on August 17, 2009, but was not played during the second preseason game against the Carolina Panthers on August 22, 2009, after being booed heavily in the first game. Furthermore, the team has preferred to play Buffett's song "Fins" after scores during the 2009 regular season instead of the traditional fight song.

=== Cheerleaders ===
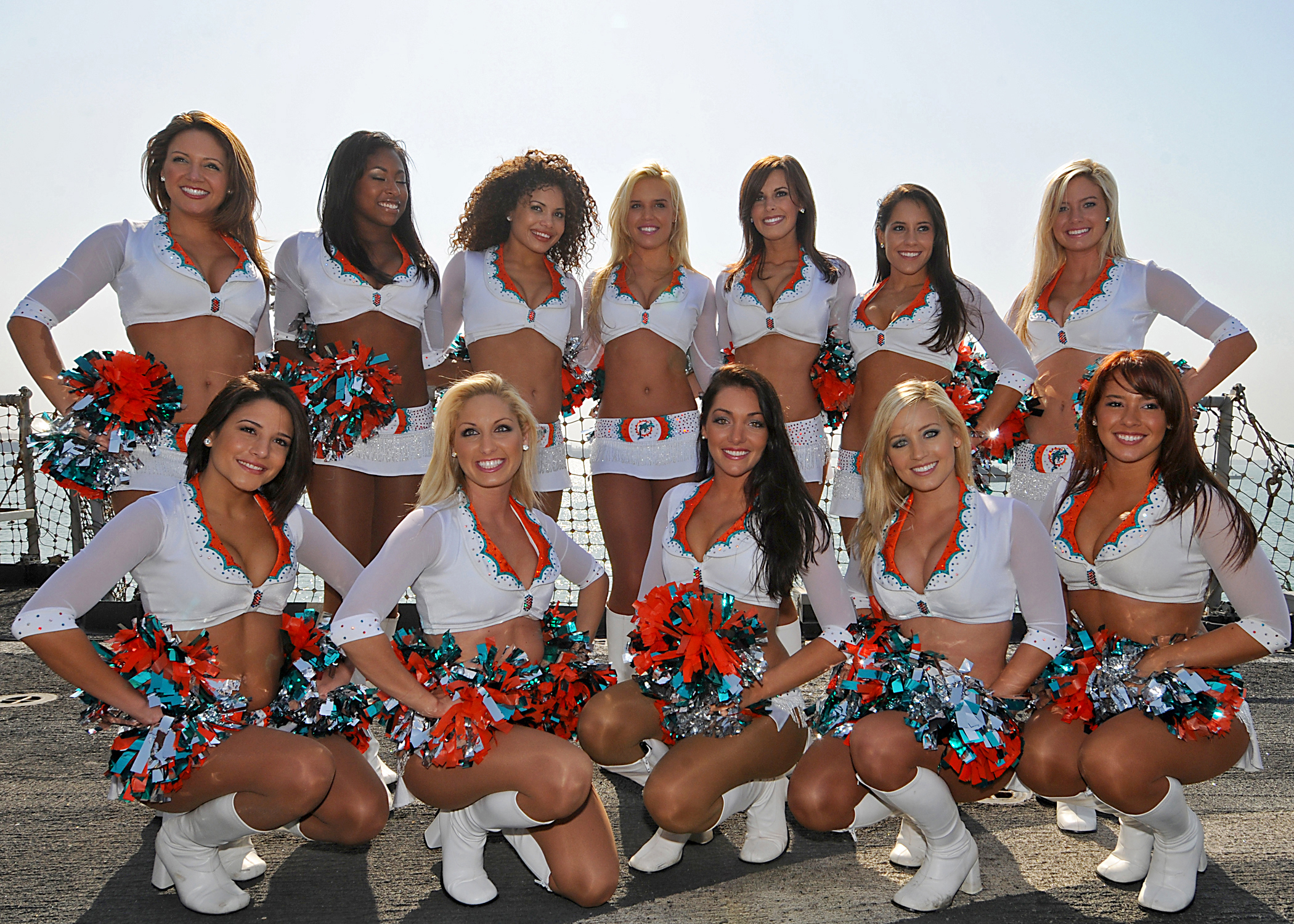
Miami Dolphins Cheerleaders

The team's cheerleaders are known collectively as the Miami Dolphins Cheerleaders. The company had its debut in 1978 as the Dolphins Starbrites. (The name referred to the co-sponsor, Starbrite Car Polish.) The cheerleaders' founding choreographer was June Taylor, famed colleague of Jackie Gleason, who led the squad until her retirement in 1990.

=== Special Teams/Volunteer Program ===
In April 2010, the Dolphins started the first Volunteer Program in the NFL. Special Teams is a unique volunteer organization created to enlist and mobilize the ongoing services of the community with the Dolphins staff, players and alumni. The mission of the Special Teams is to offer hands-on services to communities and families in need, to partner with existing organizations on worthwhile social, civic and charitable programs, to provide assistance at Miami Dolphins Foundation events, and to support community efforts in times of emergency. This program is headed by Leslie Nixon and Sergio Xiques. Since its inception, Special Teams has given over 250,000 community services hours to the South Florida and Mexico community.

=== Mascots ===
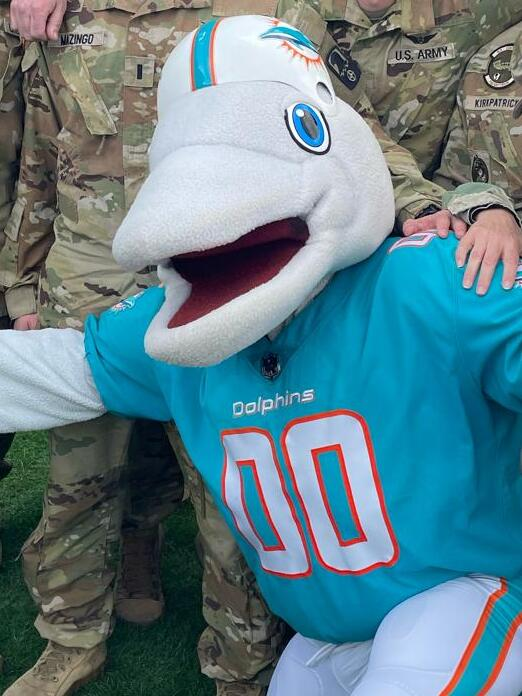
T. D. the mascot

==== T.D. ====
On Friday, April 18, 1997, the first "official" mascot of the Miami Dolphins was introduced. The 7-foot mascot made his public debut on April 19 at Pro Player Stadium during the team's draft-day party. The team then made a "Name the Mascot" contest that drew over 13,000 entries covering all 50 states and 22 countries. 529 names were suggested. The winning entry was announced at the annual Dolphins Awards Banquet on June 4, 1997.

==== Dolfan Denny ====
Denny Sym cheered on the Miami Dolphins for 33 years as a one-man sideline show, leading Miami crowds in cheers and chants in his glittering coral (orange) and aqua hat from the Dolphins' first game in 1966 until 2000. Sym died on March 18, 2007. He was 72.

==== Flipper ====
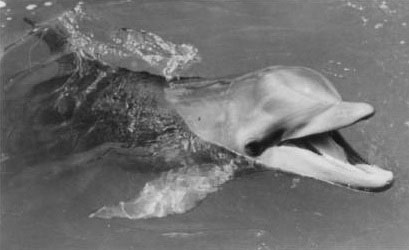
"Flipper" (former mascot)

From 1966 to 1968, and in the 1970s a live dolphin was situated in a water tank in the open (east) end of the Orange Bowl. He would jump in the tank to celebrate touchdowns and field goals. The tank that was set up in the 1970s was manufactured by Evan Bush and maintained during the games by Evan Bush and Dene Whitaker. Flipper was removed from the Orange Bowl after 1968 to save costs, and in the 1970s due to stress.

== Radio and television ==
In August 2010, the team launched its own regional TV network to carry preseason games and in-season content such as coach and player shows. The Dolphins Television Network comprises 10 South Florida TV stations that agreed to carry the team-produced coverage. Preseason games are broadcast on television through CBS-owned WFOR-TV in Miami-Dade and Broward counties, WTVX in West Palm Beach, WBBH-TV in Fort Myers, and WRDQ in Orlando. Longtime TV and radio personality Dick Stockton provides play-by-play commentary, with Dolphins Hall-of-Fame QB Bob Griese and former Dolphins WR Nat Moore providing color commentary. The radio broadcast team features Jimmy Cefalo providing play-by-play commentary and Joe Rose providing color commentary during preseason games, along with Griese for regular-season games. Griese replaced longtime color commentator Jim Mandich after his death in 2011, who played for the Dolphins under Don Shula. Radio coverage as of the 2023 season is carried WINZ (940 AM) and WBGG-FM (105.9 FM). Additionally, games can also be heard in Spanish on WNMA (1210 AM), with Raúl Striker Jr. and Joaquin Duro providing play-by-play and color commentary, respectively.

CBS-owned WFOR, in addition to preseason telecasts, airs most of the Dolphins' regular season games and Thursday Night Football, with rare home games moved or delayed by hurricanes carried by sister station WBFS-TV due to network conflicts, and some games carried by WSVN when flexed to Fox. When playing on Sunday night, the team's matches will be broadcast on NBC's WTVJ.

The Dolphins' radio affiliates:

=== English ===
Map of radio affiliates

City	Call sign	Frequency
Miami/Fort Lauderdale	WINZ	940 AM
Miami/Fort Lauderdale	WBGG-FM	105.9 FM
Fort Myers	WRXK-FM	96.1 FM
Key West	WKWF	1600 AM
Orlando	WDBO	580 AM
Port St. Lucie	WPSL	1590 AM
West Palm Beach	WESP	106.3 FM

=== Spanish ===
City	Call sign	Frequency
Miami/Fort Lauderdale	WNMA	1210 AM
West Palm Beach	WEFL	760 AM

== Players ==
=== Current roster ===
Miami Dolphins roster
**Quarterbacks (QB)**: 14 Kyle McCord; 2 Malik Willis; **Running backs (RB)**: 30 Kaytron Allen; 0 Ollie Gordon II; 34 D. J. Herman FB; 5 Jaylen Wright; **Wide receivers (WR)**: 18 Chris Bell; 21 Kevin Coleman Jr.; 7 Caleb Douglas; 1 Jalen Tolbert; 6 Malik Washington RS; 86 Jared Wayne; **Tight ends (TE)**: 85 Greg Dulcich; 80 Justin Joly; 89 Will Kacmarek; 83 Seydou Traore	**Offensive linemen (OL)**: 55 Aaron Brewer C; 79 Chukwuebuka Godrick T; 64 Christian Haynes G; 73 Austin Jackson T; 62 Jarrett Kingston T; 60 Andrew Meyer C; 52 Patrick Paul T; 74 Kadyn Proctor G; 71 Jonah Savaiinaea G; 77 Caedan Wallace G; **Defensive linemen (DL)**: 93 Zeek Biggers DT; 78 Kenneth Grant DT; 90 Malik Herring DE; 58 Jamree Kromah DE; 59 Rodney McGraw DE; 94 Jordan Phillips DT; 44 Chop Robinson DE; 92 Zach Sieler DT; 9 Joshua Uche DE	**Linebackers (LB)**: 20 Jordyn Brooks ILB; 40 Willie Gay ILB; 45 Shaka Heyward ILB; 10 Jacob Rodriguez ILB; 42 Jackson Woodard ILB; **Defensive backs (DB)**: 23 Zayne Anderson S; 8 JuJu Brents CB; 24 Marcellas Dial CB; 3 Chris Johnson CB; 19 Kyle Louis S; 4 Jason Marshall Jr. CB; 32 Jaylin Simpson CB; 16 Michael Taaffe S; 35 Reese Taylor CB; 11 Dante Trader Jr. S; 25 Julius Wood S; **Special teams (ST)**: 46 Tucker Addington LS; 48 Bradley Pinion P	**Practice squad**: 50 Liam Anderson ILB; 27 Ethan Bonner CB; 43 Major Burns S; 63 DJ Campbell G; 15 Brady Cook QB; 65 James Ester G; 53 Amari Gainer DE; 31 Zane Gonzalez K; 82 A. J. Henning WR; 91 Jordan Jefferson DT; 57 Max Llewellyn DE; 88 Jalen Reagor WR; 81 Will Sheppard WR; 26 Carlos Washington Jr. RB; 87 Tre Watson TE; 95 Eric Watts DE; **Reserve**: 28 De'Von Achane RB (IR); 22 Darrell Baker Jr. CB (PUP); 56 Ronnie Harrison ILB (IR); 95 Rene Konga DT (IR); 17 Trey Moore LB (IR); 87 Cole Turner TE (IR) 53 active, 16 practice squad, 6 reserve As of October 31, 2026. Rookies in italics.; Roster; Depth chart; Transactions

=== Miami Dolphins in the Pro Football Hall of Fame ===
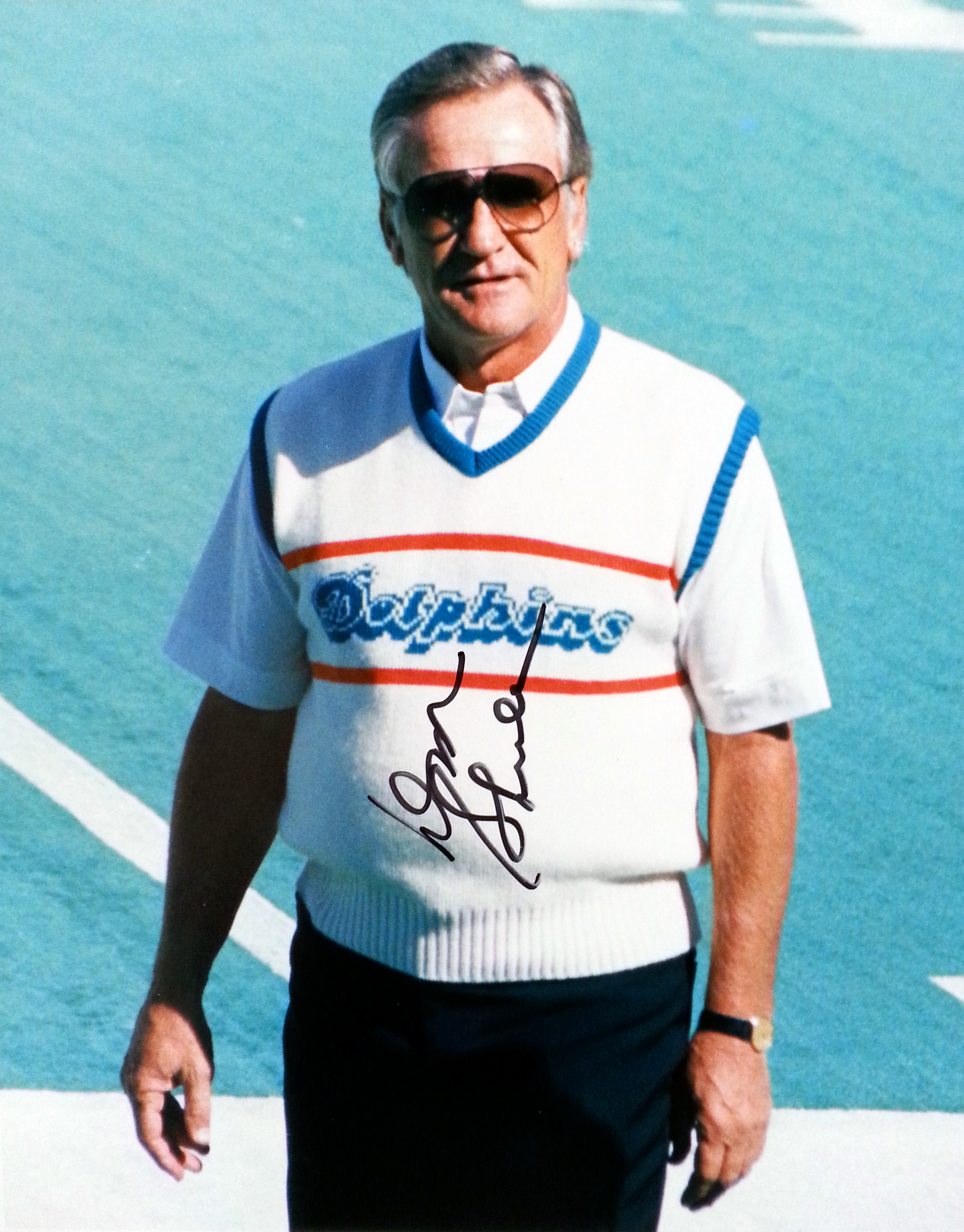
Hall of Fame Head Coach Don Shula

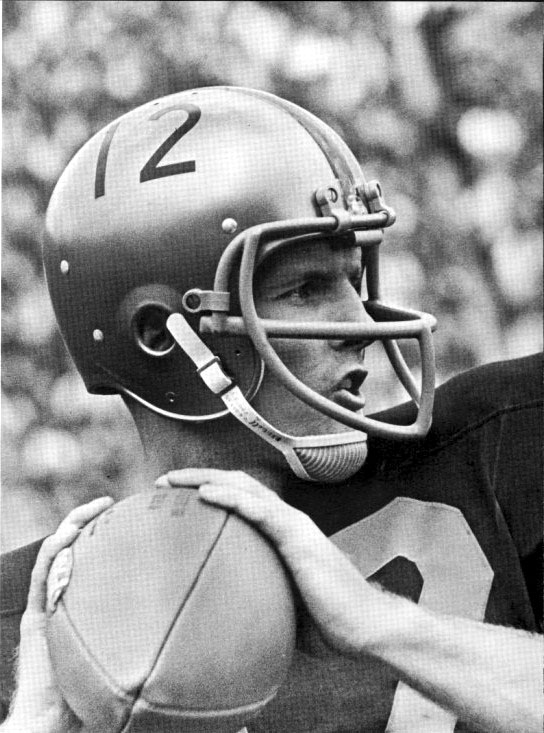
Hall of Fame QB Bob Griese

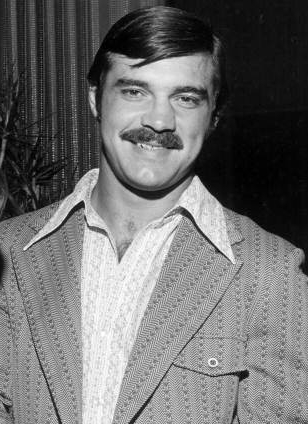
Hall of Fame FB Larry Csonka

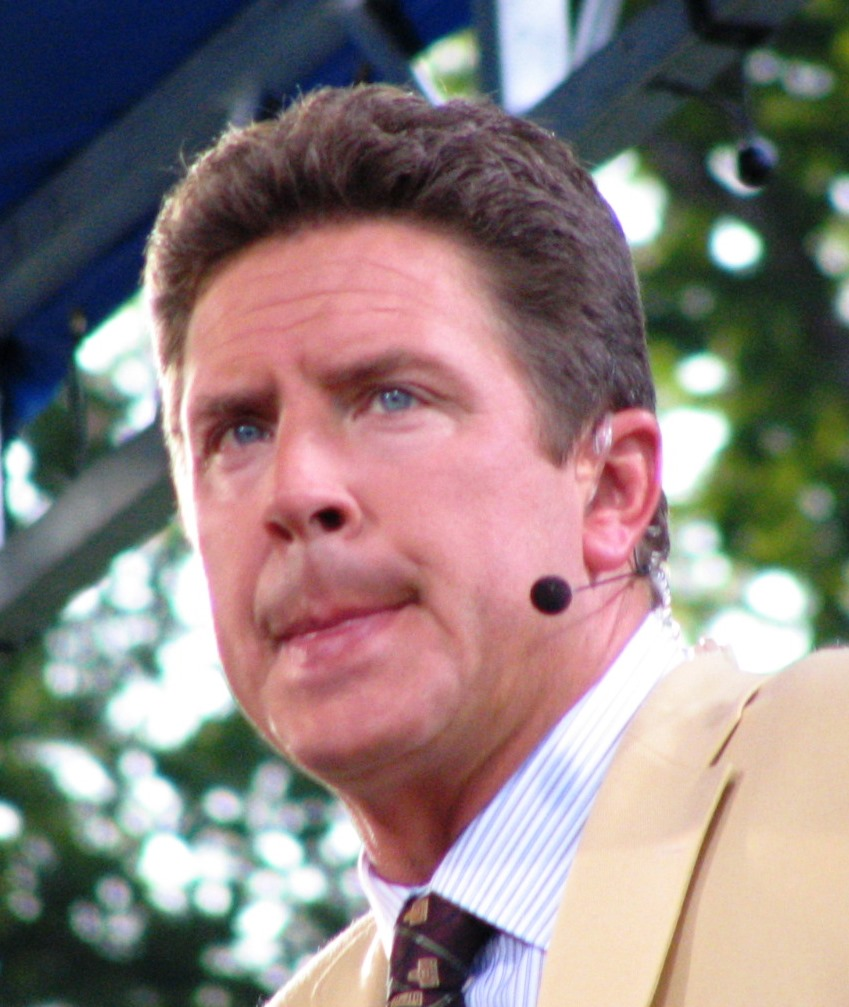
Hall of Fame QB Dan Marino

The Dolphins currently have ten players, and one coach enshrined in the Pro Football Hall of Fame, that have spent the majority (or entirety) of their careers, or made significant contributions with the Miami Dolphins. Three other players and four coaches/contributors that have spent only a "minor portion" of their careers with the Dolphins, have also been enshrined in the Pro Football Hall of Fame, but have been enshrined primarily with other teams.

**Elected to the Pro Football Hall of Fame primarily as a Miami Dolphin**

**Jersey Number Retired**

Miami Dolphins in the Pro Football Hall of Fame
Players
No.	Name	Position	Season(s)	Inducted
42	**Paul Warfield**	WR	1970–1974	1983
**39**	**Larry Csonka**	FB	1968–1974, 1979	1987
62	**Jim Langer**	C	1970–1979	1987
**12**	**Bob Griese**	QB	1967–1980	1990
66	**Larry Little**	G	1969–1980	1993
57	**Dwight Stephenson**	C	1980–1987	1998
85	**Nick Buoniconti**	LB	1969–1974, 1976	2001
**13**	**Dan Marino**	QB	1983–1999	2005
34	Thurman Thomas	RB	2000	2007
88	Cris Carter	WR	2002	2013
55	Junior Seau	LB	2003–2005	2015
99	**Jason Taylor**	DE	1997–2007, 2009, 2011	2017
54	**Zach Thomas**	LB	1996–2007	2023
Coaches and Executives
Name		Position	Season(s)	Inducted
**Don Shula**		Head coach	1970–1995	1997
Bill Parcells		Executive VP of Football Operations	2008–2010	2013
Bobby Beathard		Director of Player Personnel	1972–1977	2018
Jimmy Johnson		Head coach	1996–1999	2020
George Young		Director of Personnel and Pro Scouting	1975–1978	2020

=== Retired numbers ===
The Miami Dolphins have three retired jersey numbers.

- Bob Griese's number **12** was retired at a Miami Dolphin Awards Banquet on May 6, 1982.
- Dan Marino's number **13** was retired immediately after his retirement on September 17, 2000, during halftime of the Ravens at Dolphins game on Sunday Night Football.
- Larry Csonka's number **39**, was retired on December 9, 2002, during halftime of the Bears at Dolphins game on Monday Night Football, which celebrated the 30th anniversary of Miami's 1972 undefeated team.

**Miami Dolphins retired numbers**
No.	Player	Position	Tenure	Retired
**12**	Bob Griese	QB	1967–1980	May 6, 1982
**13**	Dan Marino	QB	1983–1999	September 17, 2000
**39**	Larry Csonka	FB	1968–1974, 1979	December 9, 2002

The Dolphins also have two numbers that have not been reissued to any player, or that are in reduced circulation but not yet officially retired.

- **54** for Zach Thomas
- **99** for Jason Taylor

As of 2025, neither Taylor nor Thomas have had their numbers retired despite being inducted into the Pro Football Hall of Fame in 2017 and 2023, respectively.

=== Individual award winners ===
Listed below are the individuals who have won the following NFL, Super Bowl, and Pro Bowl MVP awards, the Offensive and Defensive Rookie and Player of the Year awards, the Comeback Player of the Year winners, the winners of the prestigious NFL Walter Payton Man of the Year Award, and the winner of the Coach of the Year Award for the Miami Dolphins. Bold indicates those elected to the Pro Football Hall of Fame.

**NFL MVP winners**
Season	Player	Position
1984	**Dan Marino**	QB

**Super Bowl MVP winners**
Super Bowl	Player	Position
VII	Jake Scott	S
VIII	**Larry Csonka**	FB

**Pro Bowl MVP winners**
Pro Bowl	Player	Position
1973	Garo Yepremian	K
2002	Ricky Williams	RB
2011	Brandon Marshall	WR

**NFL Offensive Player of the Year winners**
Season	Player	Position
1984	**Dan Marino**	QB

**NFL Defensive Player of the Year winners**
Season	Player	Position
1973	Dick Anderson	S
1983	Doug Betters	DE
2006	**Jason Taylor**	DE

**NFL Comeback Player of the Year winners**
Season	Player	Position
1972	Earl Morrall	QB
1979	**Larry Csonka**	FB
1994	**Dan Marino**	QB
2008	Chad Pennington	QB

**NFL Offensive Rookie of the Year winners**
Season	Player	Position
1987	Troy Stradford	RB

**NFL/AFL Defensive Rookie of the Year winners**
Season	Player	Position
1968	Dick Anderson	S
1977	A. J. Duhe	LB
1994	Tim Bowens	DT

**NFL Walter Payton Man of the Year winners**
Season	Player	Position
1985	**Dwight Stephenson**	C
1998	**Dan Marino**	QB
2007	**Jason Taylor**	DE

**NFL Coach of the Year winners**
Season	Coach
1972	**Don Shula**

=== NFL All-Decade Team and 100th Anniversary All-Time Team selections ===
The following are Miami Dolphins (players and/or coaches) who have been selected to an "All-Decade Team", or the NFL 100th Anniversary All-Time Team by the Pro Football Hall of Fame selection committee. Bold indicates those elected to the Pro Football Hall of Fame.

**1970s All-Decade Team selections**
No.	Player	Position	Tenure
—	**Don Shula**	Head coach	1970–1995
62	**Jim Langer**	C	1970–1979
66	**Larry Little**	G	1969–1980
42	**Paul Warfield**	WR	1970–1974
40	Dick Anderson	S	1968–1977
1	Garo Yepremian	K	1970–1978

**1980s All-Decade Team selections**
No.	Player	Position	Tenure
57	**Dwight Stephenson**	C	1980–1987
4	Reggie Roby	P	1983–1992

**1990s All-Decade Team selections**
No.	Player	Position	Tenure
78	Richmond Webb	OT	1990–2000

**2000s All-Decade Team selections**
No.	Player	Position	Tenure
99	**Jason Taylor**	DE	1997–2007, 2009, 2011
54	**Zach Thomas**	LB	1996–2007

**2010s All-Decade Team selections**
No.	Player	Position	Tenure
93	Ndamukong Suh	DT	2015–2017
21	Frank Gore	RB	2018

**NFL 100th Anniversary All-Time Team selections**
No.	Player	Position	Tenure
—	**Don Shula**	Head coach	1970–1995
42	**Paul Warfield**	WR	1970–1974
57	**Dwight Stephenson**	C	1980–1987
13	**Dan Marino**	QB	1983–1999
55	**Junior Seau**	LB	2003–2005

=== Pro Bowl selections ===
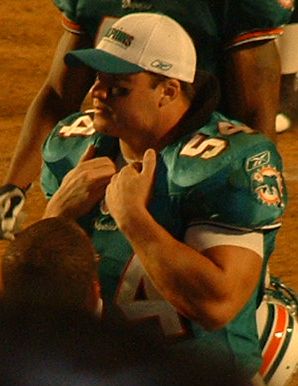
Hall of Fame LB Zach Thomas

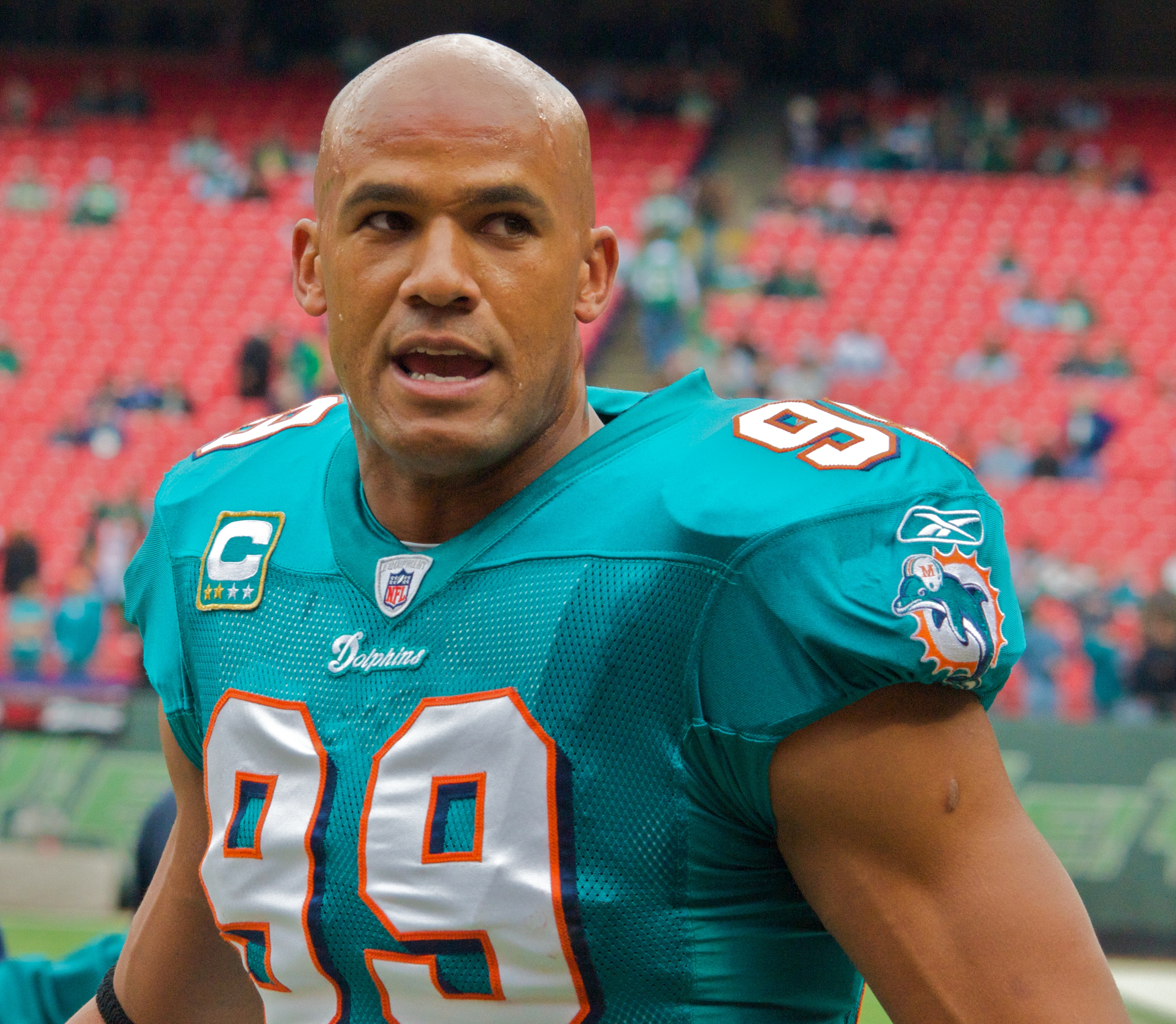
Hall of Fame DE Jason Taylor

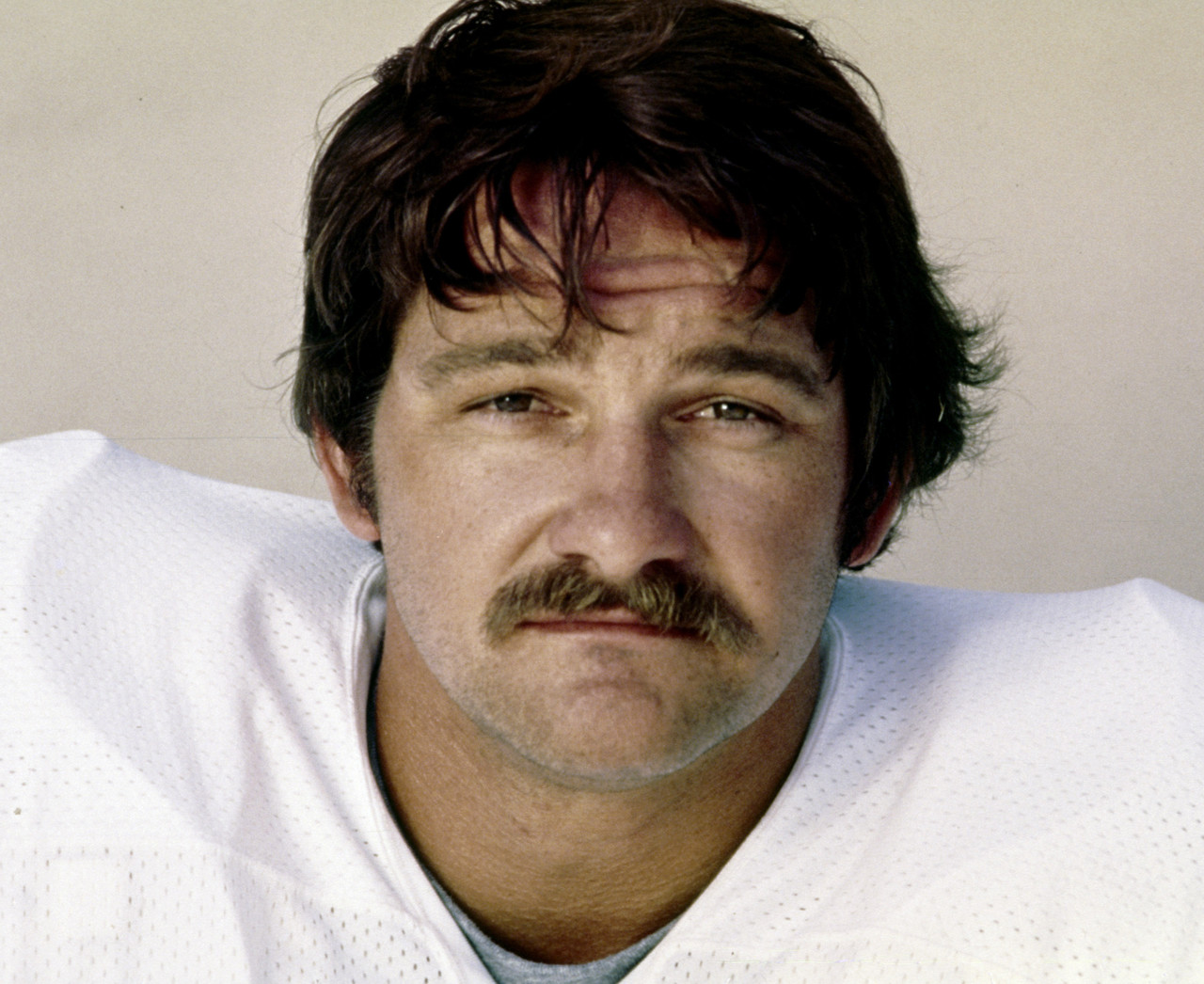
Hall of Fame C Jim Langer

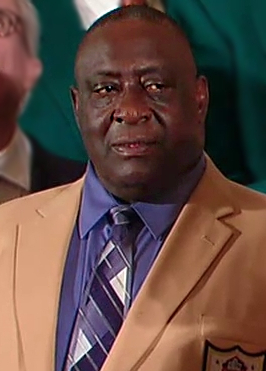
Hall of Fame G Larry Little

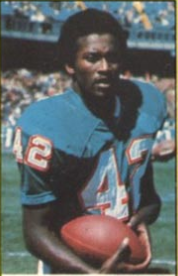
Hall of Fame WR Paul Warfield

Many former and current Miami Dolphins players have represented the franchise in the Pro Bowl (or the AFL All-Star Game). Below is a list of current or former players that play or have played for the Miami Dolphins that have been selected to at least three Pro Bowls.

**Elected to the Pro Football Hall of Fame**

**Miami Dolphins Pro Bowl selections**
No. of Pro Bowls	Player	Position	Tenure	Pro Bowl years
9	**Dan Marino**	QB	1983–1999	1983–1987, 1991–1992, 1994–1995
8	**Bob Griese**	QB	1967–1980	1967–1968, 1970–1971, 1973–1974, 1977–1978
7	**Zach Thomas**	LB	1996–2007	1999–2003, 2005–2006
7	Richmond Webb	OT	1990–2000	1990–1996
6	Bob Kuechenberg	G	1970–1984	1974–1975, 1977–1978, 1982–1983
6	**Jim Langer**	C	1970–1979	1973–1978
6	**Jason Taylor**	DE	1997–2007, 2009, 2011	2000, 2002, 2004–2007
5	Bob Baumhower	DT	1977–1986	1979, 1981–1984
5	Mark Clayton	WR	1983–1992	1984–1986, 1988, 1991
5	**Larry Csonka**	FB	1968–1974, 1979	1970–1974
5	**Larry Little**	G	1969–1980	1969, 1971–1974
5	John Offerdahl	LB	1986–1993	1986–1990
5	Jake Scott	S	1970–1975	1971–1975
5	Bill Stanfill	DE	1969–1976	1969, 1971–1974
5	**Dwight Stephenson**	C	1980–1987	1983–1987
5	Cameron Wake	DE	2009–2018	2010, 2012–2014, 2016
5	**Paul Warfield**	WR	1970–1974	1970–1974
4	Xavien Howard	CB	2016–2023	2018, 2020–2022
4	Jake Long	OT	2008–2012	2008–2011
4	Sam Madison	CB	1997–2005	1999–2002
4	Ed Newman	DE	1973–1984	1981–1984
3	Dick Anderson	S	1968–1977	1971–1973
3	**Nick Buoniconti**	LB	1969–1974, 1976	1969, 1972–1973
3	Bryan Cox	LB	1991–1995	1992, 1994–1995
3	Mark Duper	WR	1982–1992	1983–1984, 1986
3	Brent Grimes	CB	2013–2015	2013–2015
3	Jarvis Landry	WR	2014–2017	2015–2017
3	Brock Marion	S	1998–2003	2000, 2002–2003
3	Mercury Morris	RB	1969–1975	1971–1973
3	Mike Pouncey	WR	2011–2017	2013–2015
3	Keith Sims	G	1990–1997	1993–1995
3	Patrick Surtain	CB	1998–2004	2002–2004

=== 50 greatest players ===
In 2015, to commemorate the Miami Dolphins' 50th NFL season, the Dolphins organization announced through voting from the South Florida Media and Miami Dolphin fans the results of the 50 greatest players in Miami Dolphins franchise history. The results were announced during halftime on Monday Night Football between the Dolphins and the Giants. Here are the 50 greatest Dolphins broken down by position. Bold indicates those elected to the Pro Football Hall of Fame.

Offense:

- QB: **Bob Griese**, **Dan Marino**, Earl Morrall
- HB: Jim Kiick, Mercury Morris, Tony Nathan, Ricky Williams
- FB: **Larry Csonka**
- WR: Mark Clayton, Mark Duper, O.J. McDuffie, Nat Moore, **Paul Warfield**
- TE: Bruce Hardy, Keith Jackson, Jim Mandich
- C: **Jim Langer**, Mike Pouncey, **Dwight Stephenson**
- G: Bob Kuechenberg, **Larry Little**, Ed Newman, Keith Sims
- OT: Norm Evans, Richmond Webb

Defense:

- DT: Bob Baumhower, Tim Bowens, Manny Fernandez
- DE: Doug Betters, Vern Den Herder, Bill Stanfill, **Jason Taylor**, Cameron Wake
- LB: Kim Bokamper, Bob Brudzinski, **Nick Buoniconti**, Bryan Cox, A. J. Duhe, John Offerdahl, **Zach Thomas**
- CB: Brent Grimes, Sam Madison, Patrick Surtain
- S: Dick Anderson, Glenn Blackwood, Louis Oliver, Jake Scott

Special teams:

- K: Garo Yepremian
- P: Reggie Roby
- ST: Jim Jensen

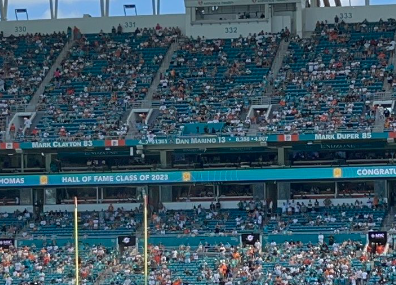
Dan Marino on the Honor Roll in-between his two "Marks Brothers" WRs Mark Clayton and Mark Duper.

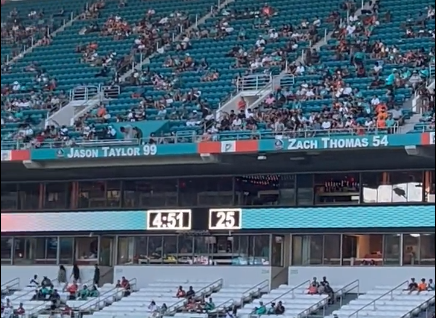
Hall of Famers Zach Thomas & Jason Taylor on the Honor Roll.

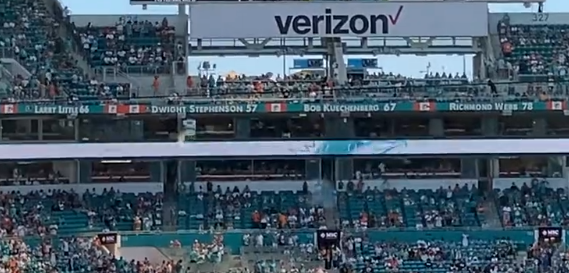
Hall of Famers Larry Little and Dwight Stephenson, up on the Honor Roll, along with Bob Kuechenberg and Richmond Webb.

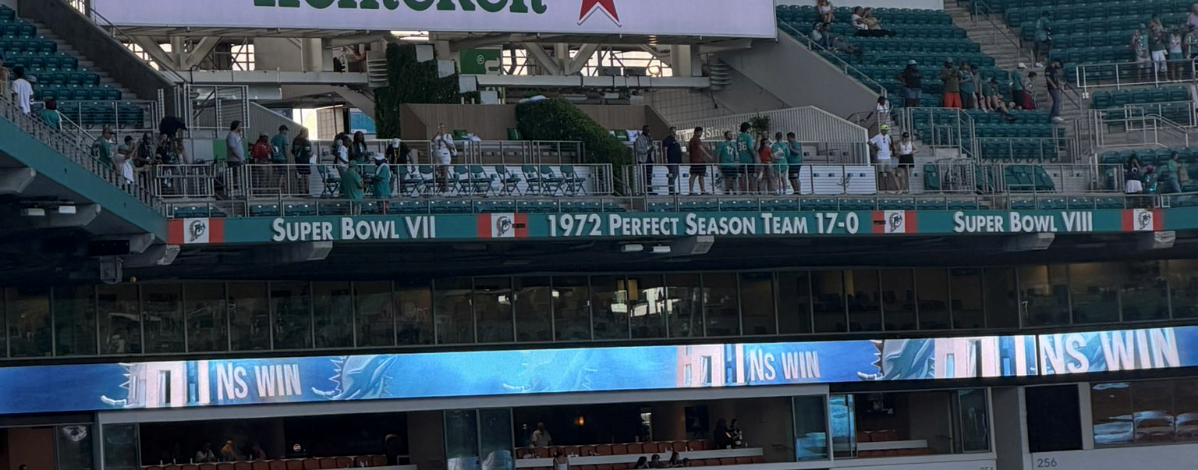
The "1972 Perfect Season Team 17-0" enshrined in one corner of the stadium on the Honor Roll, in-between the Dolphins two Super Bowl championship teams: Super Bowl VII and Super Bowl VIII.

=== Miami Dolphins Ring of Honor/Honor Roll ===
The Miami Dolphins Ring of Honor, formerly known as the Honor Roll, is a ring around the second tier of Hard Rock Stadium that honors former players, coaches, owners and contributors who have made significant contributions to the franchise throughout their history. Each of these players is honored with a placard on the facing of the upper level around Hard Rock Stadium including team founder-owner Joe Robbie. In place of a jersey number, Don Shula has the number 347, representing his record number of NFL coaching victories, 274 of them as Dolphins head coach. Dan Marino's name includes his career passing statistics of attempts (8,358), completions (4,967), passing yards (61,361), and touchdown passes (420). Pro Football Hall of Fame inductees are additionally denoted by a hall of fame logo next to their names.

In 1992, at the 20-year anniversary, Miami's "1972 Undefeated Team" was enshrined into the Honor Roll. At the 40 year anniversary, which enshrined former defensive coordinator Bill Arnsparger into the Honor Roll, his name went on the Honor Roll where the "1972 Undefeated Team" inductee previously and originally was enshrined, and an updated "1972 Perfect Season Team 17–0" inductee was put into one corner of Hard Rock Stadium with special placards of Super Bowl VII and Super Bowl VIII included next to it on each side.

**Elected to the Pro Football Hall of Fame**

**Jersey Number Retired**

The inductees as of 2024 include:

Miami Dolphins Honor Roll
No.	Name	Position(s)	Years with club	Inducted
—	Joe Robbie	Owner/Founder	1966–1989	1990
**39**	**Larry Csonka**	FB	1968–1974, 1979	1990
**12**	**Bob Griese**	QB	1967–1980	1990
62	**Jim Langer**	C	1970–1979	1990
42	**Paul Warfield**	WR	1970–1974	1990
85	**Nick Buoniconti**	LB	1969–1974, 1976	1991
1972 Undefeated Team				1992
66	**Larry Little**	G	1969–1980	1993
57	**Dwight Stephenson**	C	1980–1987	1994
67	Bob Kuechenberg	G	1970–1984	1995
347	**Don Shula**	Head coach	1970–1995	1996
89	Nat Moore	WR	1974–1986	1999
**13**	420 * 61,361 * **Dan Marino** * 8,358 * 4,967	QB	1983–1999	2000
83	Mark Clayton	WR	1983–1992	2003
85	Mark Duper	WR	1982–1992	2003
40	Dick Anderson	S	1968–1977	2006
78	Richmond Webb	OT	1990–2000	2006
73	Bob Baumhower	DT	1977–1986	2008
75	Doug Betters	DE	1978–1987	2008
13	Jake Scott	S	1970–1975	2010
84	Bill Stanfill	DE	1969–1976	2010
88	Jim Mandich	TE; Radio Broadcaster	1970–1977; 1992–2004, 2007–2010	2011
—	Bill Arnsparger	Defensive Coordinator	1970–1973, 1976–1983	2012
Super Bowl VII Team; 1972 Perfect Season Team 17–0; Super Bowl VIII Team			UPDATED; 1992 Inductee	2012
99	**Jason Taylor**	DE	1997–2007, 2009, 2011	2012
54	**Zach Thomas**	LB	1996–2007	2012
56	John Offerdahl	LB	1986–1993	2013
75	Manny Fernandez	DT	1968–1975	2014
95	Tim Bowens	DT	1994–2004	2024

=== Joe Robbie Alumni Plaza Walk of Fame ===
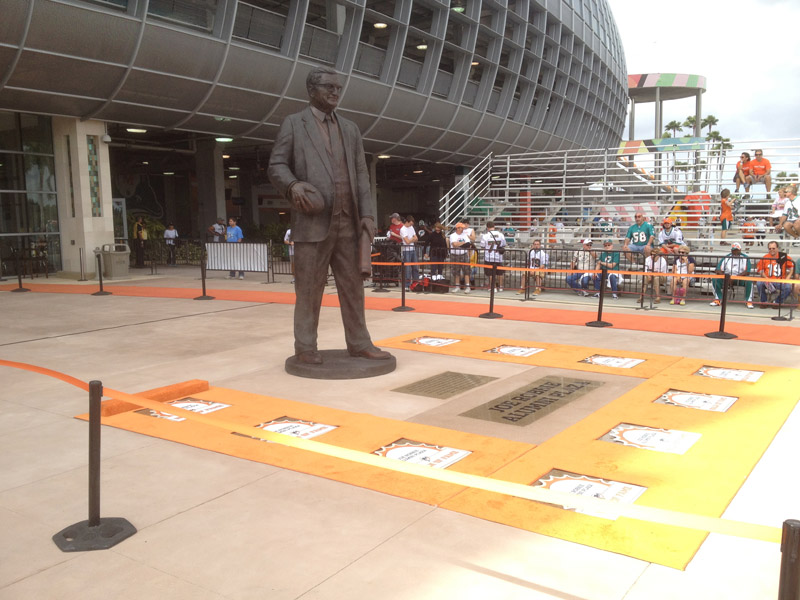
A statue of the original founder/owner of the Miami Dolphins from 1966 to 1989, Joe Robbie, on display as the centerpiece to the Joe Robbie Alumni Plaza Walk of Fame.

The Joe Robbie Alumni Plaza Walk of Fame was first established in 2011, designed to be all-encompassing and recognize the best of the Miami Dolphins alumni, including those in the Pro Football Hall of Fame, the Honor Roll, and as well as the many other players who were among the unsung heroes and community leaders that the organization has produced. The "Walk of Fame" is located at the north end of Hard Rock Stadium, with a life-size bronze statue of Joe Robbie, the original founder and owner of the Miami Dolphins from 1966 to 1989. Bold indicates those elected to the Pro Football Hall of Fame.

The inductees as of 2018 (by yearly class) are:

- Class of 2011: **Nick Buoniconti**, **Larry Csonka**, **Bob Griese**, **Jim Langer**, **Larry Little**, Joe Robbie, **Dan Marino**, **Don Shula**, **Dwight Stephenson**, **Paul Warfield**
- Class of 2012: Tim Bowens, A. J. Duhe, Manny Fernandez, Nat Moore, Earl Morrall, Don Strock
- Class of 2013: Kim Bokamper, Mercury Morris, O. J. McDuffie, Keith Sims
- Class of 2014: Jeff Cross, Sam Madison, Tony Nathan, Ed Newman
- No classes from 2015 to 2017, due to modernization and reconstruction at Hard Rock Stadium
- Class of 2018: Dick Anderson, Mark Clayton, Mark Duper, Jon Giesler, John Offerdahl, **Jason Taylor**

== Staff ==
=== Head coaches ===
The Dolphins have had 15 head coaches in franchise history. The current head coach of the Dolphins is Jeff Hafley, since his hiring on January 19, 2026.

=== Current staff ===
Miami Dolphins staff
Front office: Chairman/Managing general partner – Stephen Ross; CEO – Daniel Sillman; Senior vice president, chief financial officer – Chris Clements; General manager – Jon-Eric Sullivan; Assistant general manager – Kyle Smith; Executive vice president, football operations – Brandon Shore; Senior personnel executive – Jon Robinson; Senior personnel executive – Shaun Herock; Director of player personnel – Matt Winston; Assistant director of player personnel – Josh Scobey; Director of college scouting – Grant Wallace; Director of pro scouting – Venzell Boulware; Vice president of football administration and strategy – Max Napolitano; Senior director, football operations – Olivia Sheehy; Director, football analytics – Ella Summer; Director, scouting operations – Minh Luu; Manager, football administration – John Glaser; Senior national scout – Ron Brockington; Special advisor to the vice chairman, president and CEO – Dan Marino; Head coaches: Head coach – Jeff Hafley; Offensive coaches: Offensive coordinator – Bobby Slowik; Passing game coordinator – Kevin Patullo; Quarterbacks – Bush Hamdan; Running backs – Ladell Betts; Wide receivers – Tyke Tolbert; Assistant wide receivers – Jonathan Krause; Tight ends – Ron Middleton; Assistant tight ends – Lemuel Jeanpierre; Offensive line – Zach Yenser; Assistant offensive line – Matt Applebaum; Offensive assistant – Leander Wallace; Offensive assistant – C. J. Conrad	Defensive coaches: Defensive coordinator – Sean Duggan; Defensive line – Austin Clark; Assistant defensive line – Chuka Ndulue; Linebackers – Al Washington; Assistant linebackers – Wendel Davis; Defensive backs/Passing game coordinator – Ryan Downard; Defensive backs/Cornerbacks – Jahmile Addae; Assistant defensive backs/Nickels – DeShawn Shead; Run game coordinator/Senior defensive assistant – Joe Barry; Defensive quality control – Siriki Diabate; Special teams coaches: Special teams coordinator – Chris Tabor; Assistant special teams – Brock Olivo; Special teams assistant – Darius Eubanks; Strength and conditioning coaches: Director, strength and conditioning – Todd Hunt; Assistant director, strength and conditioning – Willie Jones; Assistant strength and conditioning coach – Ike Brown, Andrew Papirio; → Coaching staff → Front office → More NFL staffs

Preceded by Dallas Cowboys	Super Bowl champions 1972 (VII), 1973 (VIII)	Succeeded by Pittsburgh Steelers
