= Publicly traded private equity =

Listed private equity (LPE)

Publicly traded private equity, also known as publicly quoted private equity or publicly listed private equity, is an investment firm or investment vehicle, which makes investments conforming to one of the various private equity strategies, and is listed on a public stock exchange.

There are fundamentally two separate opportunities that private equity firms pursued in the public markets. These options involved a public listing of either:

- A private equity firm (the management company), which provides shareholders an opportunity to gain exposure to the management fees and carried interest earned by the investment professionals and managers of the private equity firm. The most notable example of this public listing was completed by The Blackstone Group in 2007
- A private equity fund or similar investment vehicle, which allows investors that would otherwise be unable to invest in a traditional private equity limited partnership to gain exposure to a portfolio of private equity investments.

== Business Development Companies ==
Historically, in the United States, there had been a group of publicly traded private equity firms that were registered as business development companies (BDCs) under the Investment Company Act of 1940.

Typically, BDCs are structured similar to real estate investment trusts (REITs) in that the BDC structure reduces or eliminates corporate income tax. In return, REITs are required to distribute 95% of their income, which may be taxable to its investors.

As of the end of 2008, among the largest BDCs (by market value, excluding Apollo Investment Corp, discussed elsewhere) are: American Capital Strategies (Nasdaq: ACAS), Ares Capital Corp. (Nasdaq: ARCC), BlackRock Kelso Capital Corp, Gladstone Investment Corp (Nasdaq: GAIN) and Kohlberg Capital Corp (Nasdaq: KCAP).

== Venture capital trusts ==
A venture capital trust or VCT is a highly tax efficient UK closed-end collective investment scheme designed to provide capital finance for small expanding companies and capital gains for investors. VCTs are companies listed on the London Stock Exchange, which invest in other companies which are not themselves listed.

First introduced by the Conservative government in the Finance Act, 1995 they have proved to be much less risky than originally anticipated. The last created VCTs to encourage investment into new UK businesses.

== History ==
Although there had previously been certain instances of publicly traded private equity vehicles, the convergence of private equity and the public equity markets attracted significantly greater attention when several of the largest private equity firms pursued various options through the public markets. Taking private equity firms and private equity funds public appeared an unusual move since private equity funds often buy public companies listed on exchange and then take them private. Private equity firms are rarely subject to the quarterly reporting requirements of the public markets and tout this independence to prospective sellers as a key advantage of going private.

=== Blackstone Group IPO ===
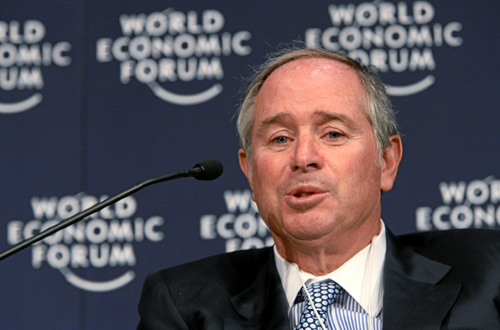
Schwarzman's Blackstone Group completed the first major IPO of a private equity firm in June 2007.

On March 22, 2007, the Blackstone Group filed with the SEC to raise $4 billion in an initial public offering. On June 21, Blackstone swapped a 12.3% stake in its ownership for $4.13 billion in the largest U.S. IPO since 2002. Traded on the New York Stock Exchange under the ticker symbol BX, Blackstone priced at $31 per share on June 22, 2007.

=== KKR Private Equity ===
In May 2006, Kohlberg Kravis Roberts raised $5 billion in an initial public offering for a new permanent investment vehicle (KKR Private Equity Investors or KPE) listing it on the Euronext exchange in Amsterdam (ENXTAM: KPE). KKR raised more than three times what it had expected at the outset as many of the investors in KPE were hedge funds seeking exposure to private equity but could not make long-term commitments to private equity funds. Because private equity had been booming in the preceding years, the proposition of investing in a KKR fund appeared attractive to certain investors. However, KPE's first-day performance was lackluster, trading down 1.7% and trading volume was limited. Initially, a handful of other private equity firms and hedge funds had planned to follow KKR's lead but shelved those plans when KPE's performance continued to falter after its IPO. KPE's stock declined from an IPO price of €25 per share to €18.16 (a 27% decline) at the end of 2007 and a low of €11.45 (a 54.2% decline) per share in Q1 2008. KPE disclosed in May 2008 that it had completed approximately $300 million of secondary sales of selected limited partnership interests in and undrawn commitments to certain KKR-managed funds in order to generate liquidity and repay borrowings.

Less than two weeks after the Blackstone Group IPO, in 2007 Kohlberg Kravis Roberts filed with the SEC in July 2007 to raise $1.25 billion by selling an ownership interest in its management company. KKR had previously listed its KKR Private Equity Investors (KPE) private equity fund vehicle in 2006. The onset of the credit crunch and the shutdown of the IPO market would dampen the prospects of obtaining a valuation that would be attractive to KKR and the flotation was repeatedly postponed.

== Response to private equity IPOs ==
The initial public offering completed by Blackstone intensified the level of attention directed toward the private equity industry overall as media commentators focused on the large payout received by the firm's CEO Steve Schwarzman. Schwarzman received a severe backlash from both critics of the private equity industry and fellow investors in private equity. An ill-timed birthday event around the time of the IPO led various commentators to draw comparisons to the excesses of notorious executives including Bernie Ebbers (WorldCom) and Dennis Kozlowski (Tyco International). David Bonderman, a co-founder of the private equity firm TPG Capital, remarked, "We have all wanted to be private – at least until now. When Steve Schwarzman's biography with all the dollar signs is posted on the web site none of us will like the furor that results – and that's even if you like Rod Stewart."

Meanwhile, other private equity investors would also seek to realize a portion of the value locked into their firms. In September 2007, the Carlyle Group sold a 7.5% interest in its management company to Mubadala Development Company, which is owned by the Abu Dhabi Investment Authority (ADIA) for $1.35 billion, which valued Carlyle at approximately $20 billion. Similarly, in January 2008, Silver Lake Partners sold a 9.9% stake in its management company to CalPERS for $275 million.

Additionally, Apollo Management completed a private placement of shares in its management company in July 2007. By pursuing a private placement rather than a public offering, Apollo would be able to avoid much of the public scrutiny applied to Blackstone and KKR. In April 2008, Apollo filed with the SEC to permit some holders of its privately traded stock to sell their shares on the New York Stock Exchange. In April 2004, Apollo raised $930 million for a listed business development company, Apollo Investment Corporation Nasdaq: AINV, to invest primarily in middle-market companies in the form of mezzanine debt and senior secured loans, as well as by making direct equity investments in companies. The company also invests in the securities of public companies.

== See also ==
- Private equity
- Private equity secondary market
- History of private equity and venture capital
- Business Development Company
