= Dolfan Denny =

American football fan

Dolfan Denny was the name given to Denny Sym by Miami Dolphins football fans. He was known for cheering on the NFL team for 33 years as a one-man sideline show, often leading Miami crowds in cheers and chants from each corner of the field. He usually wore glittering orange and aqua hats, and did so since the Dolphins' first game in 1966 until 2000. In 1976, the Dolphins began paying him $50 per game to cheer from the sideline after being impressed by his spirit and passion. He then retired his act in 2000, at the age of 65, after suffering chronic health problems. At one point, he had to cheer while seated due to knee problems.

== Death ==
Denny Sym died on March 18, 2007, of kidney disease and cancer at the age of 72.
