= ReSource Pro =

American business process management and technology services company

- Type: Private
- Industry: Insurance
- Founded: 2003; 23 years ago
- Founder: Distinguished Programs Group
- Headquarters: New York City, U.S.
- Key people: Dan Epstein Tagger (CEO)
- Number of employees: 13,000+ (2026) (2024)
- Website: www.resourcepro.com

ReSource Pro is a business process management and technology services company headquartered in New York City. It operates in the United States, Serbia, India, China, and Philippines, providing AI-supported operations, analytics, and administrative support to firms in the insurance sector.

ReSource Pro has appeared on the Inc. 5000 ranking of privately held U.S. companies seventeen times and has expanded its operations through acquisitions and partnerships related to insurance technology and compliance.

In 2011, it was the focus of a case study published by Harvard Business School, which examined its offshoring strategy and organizational development.

== History ==
ReSource Pro originated in 2003 as an in-house processing unit of Distinguished Programs Group, a New York insurance program manager, after the carrier Kemper’s withdrawal from the market left the firm with an operations gap. Matthew Bruno, then a DPG employee, set up the unit in Qingdao, China. It was incorporated as a separate company, ReSource Pro LLC, in 2004. The company established with a focus on delivering back-office support to U.S.-based insurance organizations.

Dan Epstein joined the company in 2005 as vice president of business development and was named chief executive officer in July 2006, succeeding David Watkins.

In the years following its founding, ReSource Pro broadened its service offerings to include technology-enabled and AI-assisted operations, analytics, and compliance support. The company has expanded its delivery operations to include centers in India and the Philippines, while maintaining offices in various locations in the United States.

In 2011, Harvard Business School published a case study analyzing ReSource Pro's business model and cross-border operations, focusing on the integration of offshore teams within the U.S. insurance market.

In April 2018, the private equity firm DFW Capital Partners acquired a majority stake in ReSource Pro from Distinguished Programs Group, with the company's management retaining a minority holding. In December 2021, DFW sold its stake to Kelso & Company, which became the majority owner. Between 2020 and 2025, ReSource Pro completed several acquisitions, including The Nolan Company, TowerIQ, Strategy Meets Action, Helix Agency Services, Lowry & Associates, and Propellint.

In April of 2026, ReSource Pro announced its AI Orchestration and Data Management Suite further broadening its service offerings to include AI-supported insurance operations, management of client data, and implementation of traceable, governed AI workflows. In June 2026, ReSource Pro co-announced the acquisition of the core team, intellectual property, and technology of Flow Specialty alongside the establishment of the company's dedicated unit for developing and delivering managed agentic services to clients.

=== Acquisitions ===
In 2020, it acquired Oceanus Partners and Strategy Meets Action, consulting firms specializing in insurance distribution strategies.

In 2021, it acquired The Nolan Company, a management consulting firm focused on insurance and healthcare.

In 2022, it acquired MIS, a managed technology services provider for carriers and MGAs, and TowerIQ, a technology platform that provides digital solutions for commercial insurance workflows.

In 2024 and 2025, ReSource Pro acquired Helix Agency Services, Lowry & Associates, and Propellint, further expanding its offerings in licensing, surplus lines compliance, and technology services.

In November 2025, ReSource Pro acquired Supportive Insurance Services (SIS), a firm based in Indiana that provides insurance licensing and renewal services. The acquisition expanded ReSource Pro's compliance and regulatory offerings in the insurance sector by integrating SIS's licensing and renewal expertise into its service portfolio.

In June 2026, ReSource Pro acquired the core team, intellectual property, and technology of Flow Specialty, an AI-focused wholesale insurance brokerage.

== Recognition and awards ==
- ReSource Pro has appeared on the Inc. 5000 list of fastest-growing private U.S. companies 17 times, including in 2025.
- In 2024, ReSource Pro was named an Inc. Power Partner and in was named an Inc. Regionals Northeast winner in 2021 and 2024.
- In 2025, ReSource Pro won the CSO Awards for Cybersecurity Leadership. In 2026, ReSource Pro won the CSO Award for Cybersecurity Awareness and Training.
- In 2019, ReSource Pro won 3 Stevie Awards for Customer Service based on the company's response efforts in the wake of Hurricane Harvey. In 2021, ReSource Pro won a Stevie Award for Back Office Customer Service Department of the Year.
