= Ares Management =

American asset management company

Ares Management Corporation

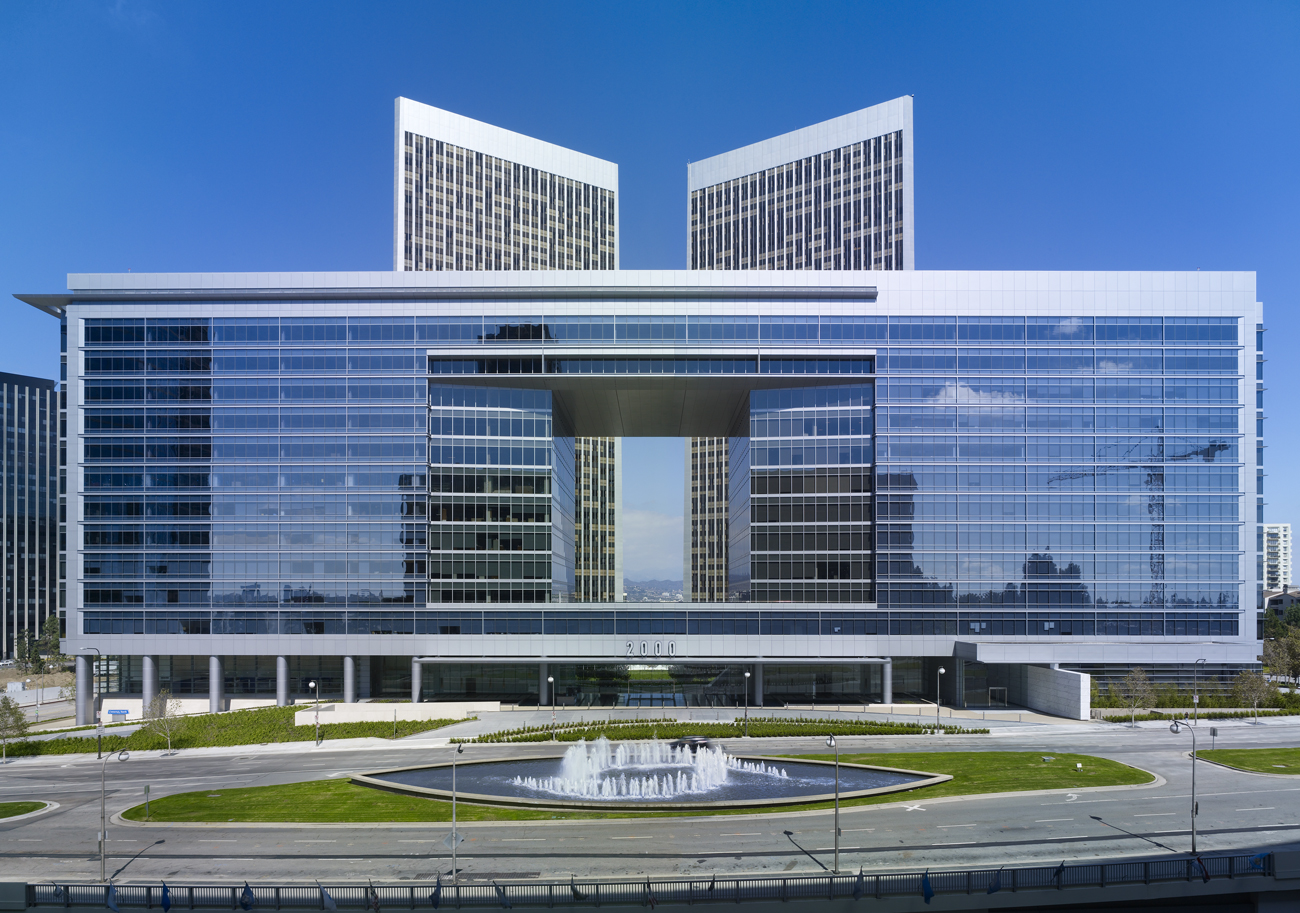
- Ares Management's global headquarters
- Type: Public
- Traded as: NYSE: ARES (Class A); S&P 500 component
- Industry: Asset Management
- Founded: 1997; 29 years ago
- Founders: Antony Ressler, John Kissick, Michael Arougheti, David Kaplan, and Bennett Rosenthal
- Headquarters: Los Angeles, California, U.S.
- Revenue: ▲US$3.885 billion (2024)
- Operating income: ▲US$946 million (2024)
- Net income: ▲US$441 million (2024)
- AUM: ▲$596 billion (2025)
- Total assets: ▲US$24.884 billion (2024)
- Total equity: ▲US$6.824 billion (2024)
- Number of employees: approx. 4,200 (November 2025)
- Website: www.aresmgmt.com www.arescapitalcorp.com www.arescre.com www.arespublicfunds.com

Ares Management Corporation is a global alternative investment manager operating in the credit, private equity and real estate markets. The company was founded in 1997, with additional offices across North America, Europe, and Asia.

As of June 30, 2026, Ares Management Corporation's global platform had approximately $671.3 billion in assets under management and 4,400 employees operating across North America, Europe, Asia Pacific and the Middle East.

== History ==
The firm was established in 1997. The co-founders included Antony Ressler, Michael Arougheti, David Kaplan, John H. Kissick, and Bennett Rosenthal. It has several subsidiaries:

- Ares Capital Corporation: established in 2004 and provides financing for middle market acquisitions, recapitalizations, and leveraged buyouts, mainly in the United States. It is a publicly traded closed-end, non-diversified specialty finance company that is regulated as a business development company (BDC) under the Investment Company Act of 1940.
- Ares Capital Management LLC: an SEC-registered investment adviser, is the investment adviser to Ares Capital Corporation.
- Ares Management Limited: established in 2006 as an expansion of the Ares business platform into Europe, focused on Ares European capital markets operations. It is authorized under the Financial Conduct Authority (FCA) in the United Kingdom to provide certain investment advisory services.

In May 2007, a minority interest in the firm was acquired by an international institutional investor, Abu Dhabi Investment Authority. It did not acquire any voting or governance rights via its investment.

In May 2014, Ares Management completed its initial public offering and is currently listed on the New York Stock Exchange. In April 2016, Ares Management closed its fifth global private equity fund, raising $7.85 billion. In May 2016, Ares Management announced a plan to buy asset management company American Capital; the US$3.4 billion deal closed in January 2017.

On January 30, 2020, Ares Management acquired a controlling stake in the Hong Kong–based alternative investment firm SSG Capital Management. The deal was formally completed on July 2, 2020, and SSG Capital Management now operates under the name Ares SSG.

On July 1, 2021, Ares Management announced the completion of its acquisition of Black Creek Group's U.S. real estate investment advisory and distribution business.

In June 2024, Ares Management, in co-operation with Searchlight Capital, invested £500 million in a preferred equity transaction in RSK Group, a UK-based environmental, engineering and technical services group.

In October 2024, Ares Management acquired the international business of GLP Capital Partners (GCP), excluding its Greater China business, for approximately $3.7 billion in cash and $1.9 billion in Ares Class A common stock.

In December 2024, Ares acquired 10% of the Miami Dolphins of the National Football League. It was one of the first deals allowing outside investors to buy into an NFL franchise after league owners voted to allow new investors in August.

In April 2026, Ares agreed to acquire Whitestone REIT—operator of outdoor shopping centers across Arizona and Texas—in a $1.7 billion all-cash transaction.

== Operations ==
The firm is among the largest players in the private debt market.

Ares' investment activities are conducted through four business units:

- Ares Credit Group manages liquid and illiquid credit in the non-investment grade credit sector, with approximately $60.0 billion in assets under management as of May 10, 2016.
- Ares Private Equity Group makes opportunistic majority or shared-control investments, principally in under-capitalized middle market companies, and manages investments in U.S. power and infrastructure assets in the power generation, transmission, and midstream sectors. As of 2016, it manages approximately $23.3 billion in assets under management through four corporate private equity commingled funds focused on North America and, to a lesser extent, Europe, one China growth fund and four commingled funds and six related co-investment vehicles focused on U.S. power and infrastructure assets as of May 10, 2016.
- Ares Real Estate Group manages public and private equity and debt investments in real estate assets in North America and Europe. With approximately $10.2 billion in assets under management, it manages several investment vehicles including its publicly traded REIT, Ares Commercial Real Estate Corporation, U.S. and European real estate private equity commingled funds and real estate equity and debt separately managed accounts as of May 10, 2016.
- Ares SSG was formed when Ares Management acquired an alternative investment firm, SSG Capital Management. It makes credit, private equity and special situations investments across the Asia-Pacific region.
