= Business Development Company =

Type of investment company in the United States

A Business Development Company (BDC) is a form of unregistered closed-end investment company in the United States that invests in small and mid-sized businesses. This form of company was created by the US Congress in 1980 in the amendments to the Investment Company Act of 1940. Publicly filing firms may elect regulation as BDCs if they meet certain requirements of the Investment Company Act.

BDCs were created to provide small and growing companies access to capital and to enable private equity funds to access public capital markets. Under the legislation, a BDC must invest at least 70% of its assets in nonpublic US companies with market values of less than $250 million. Moreover, like REITs, as long as 90% or more of the BDC's income is distributed to investors, a BDC is not taxed at the corporate level. Although BDCs are allowed to invest in the capital structure, the vast majority of the investment has been debt because BDCs typically leverage their equity with debt (up to 2X their equity), and fixed-income investing supports their debt obligations.

== Regulation and tax structure ==
Election means the BDC must subject itself to all relevant provisions of the Investment Company Act, which (a) limits how much debt a BDC may incur, (b) prohibits most affiliated transactions, (c) requires a code of ethics and a comprehensive compliance program, and (d) requires regulation by the Securities and Exchange Commission (SEC) and subject to regular examination, like all mutual funds and closed-end funds. BDCs are also required to file quarterly reports, annual reports, and proxy statements with the SEC. Some BDCs are publicly traded, while others are not.

BDCs are usually taxed as regulated investment companies (RICs) under the Internal Revenue Code. Like real estate investment trusts (REITs), as long as the RIC meets certain income, diversity, and distribution requirements, the company pays little or no corporate income tax. As a pass-through tax structure, RICs must distribute at least 90 percent of taxable income as dividends to investors. Most BDCs distribute 98 percent of their taxable income to avoid all corporate taxation. (RICs fall under section 851 of the Internal Revenue Code; REITs fall under section 856.) At least two BDCs have stated that they intend to be taxed as a REIT. Because income is not taxed at the corporate level, distributions to investors are generally taxable for investors based on the type of income earned by the BDC. For example, ordinary income to the BDC is taxable for investors at ordinary income rates, while capital gains income to the BDC is generally taxable for investors at capital gains rates.

Historically, BDCs are listed on a national stock exchange like the NYSE or NASDAQ. Recently, as is common for REITs, some BDCs have declined to list on an exchange. Unlisted BDCs are required to follow the same regulatory structure as listed BDCs.

== Distinctiveness ==
BDCs are similar to venture capital (VC) or private equity (PE) funds since they provide investors with a way to invest in small companies and participate in the sale of those investments. However, VC and PE funds are often closed to all but wealthy investors. BDCs, on the other hand, allow anyone who purchases a share to participate in the open market. This feature often attracts money to newly public BDCs, thereby giving them a faster way to raise capital for investments than VC funds.

== Impact on financing ==
BDCs often function as substitutes for traditional lenders.

== Larger BDCs ==
Among the largest BDCs by market value, are (in alphabetical order):

- Ares Capital Corp. (Nasdaq: ARCC)
- Main Street Capital (Nasdaq: MAIN)
- BlackRock Kelso Capital Corp (Nasdaq: BKCC)
- FS KKR Capital Corp. (NYSE: FSK)
- Gladstone Investment Corp (Nasdaq: GAIN)
- Goldman Sachs BDC (Nasdaq: GSBD)
- Golub Capital BDC, Inc. (Nasdaq: GBDC)
- Hercules Technology Growth Capital (Nasdaq: HTGC)
- Trinity Capital (Nasdaq: TRIN)
- Horizon Technology Finance Corporation (Nasdaq: HRZN)
- KCAP Financial, Inc (Nasdaq: KCAP)
- MidCap Financial Investment Corporation (Nasdaq: MFIC)
- PennantPark Investment Corp (Nasdaq: PNNT)
- Prospect Capital Corp (Nasdaq: PSEC)

Some BDCs are non-traded, with $1 billion or more of assets under management. The largest non-traded BDCs are as follows:

- FS Investment Corporation II
- FS Energy & Power Fund
- FS Investment Corporation III
- Business Development Corp of America
- TCW Direct Lending LLC
- CĪON Investment Corporation
- Sierra Income Corp

== See also ==
- Private equity
- Publicly traded private equity
- History of private equity and venture capital
- Venture capital trust
