= List of Miami Dolphins award winners =

This page lists the awards won by players of the Miami Dolphins, a professional American football team who compete in the National Football League. The Dolphins' most recent award winner was Jason Taylor, who won the Defensive Player of the year and the Walter Payton Man of the Year awards in 2006 and 2007 respectively.

== Individual League Awards ==
=== Associated Press NFL Most Valuable Player Award ===
- 1984: Dan Marino, QB

=== Associated Press NFL Offensive Player of the Year Award ===
- 1984: Dan Marino, QB

=== Associated Press NFL Defensive Player of the Year Award ===
- 1973: Dick Anderson, S
- 1983: Doug Betters, DE
- 2006: Jason Taylor, DE

=== Associated Press NFL Offensive Rookie of the Year Award ===
- 1987: Troy Stradford, RB

=== Associated Press NFL Defensive Rookie of the Year Award ===
- 1977: A. J. Duhe, DE
- 1994: Tim Bowens, DT

=== Super Bowl Most Valuable Player Award ===
- 1973 (VII): Jake Scott, S
- 1974 (VIII): Larry Csonka, RB

=== Associated Press NFL Coach of the Year Award ===
- 1972: Don Shula

=== Walter Payton NFL Man of the Year Award ===
- 1985: Dwight Stephenson, C
- 1998: Dan Marino, QB
- 2007: Jason Taylor, DE

=== NFLPA Alan Page Community Award ===
- 1986: Nat Moore, WR
