= Manny Fernandez (American football) =

American football player (1946–2026)

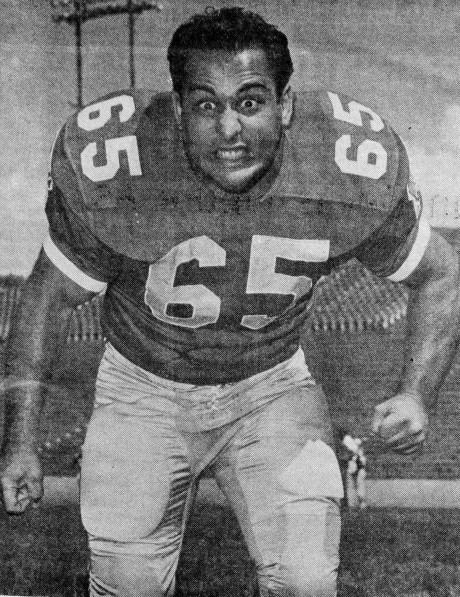
- Fernandez, circa 1967

No. 75
- Positions: Defensive tackle, Defensive end

Personal information
- Born: July 3, 1946; Hayward, California, U.S.
- Died: May 24, 2026 (aged 79); Ellaville, Georgia, U.S.
- Listed height: 6 ft 2 in (1.88 m)
- Listed weight: 250 lb (113 kg)

Career information
- High school: San Lorenzo (Ashland, California)
- College: Utah
- NFL draft: 1968: undrafted

Career history
- Miami Dolphins (1968–1975)

Awards and highlights
- 2× Super Bowl champion (VII, VIII); 2× Second team All-Pro (1970, 1973); Miami Dolphins Honor Roll; Dolphins Walk of Fame (2012)

Career NFL/AFL statistics
- Fumble recoveries: 6
- Sacks: 35
- Stats at Pro Football Reference

Manuel Jose Fernandez (July 3, 1946 – May 24, 2026) was an American professional football player who was a defensive lineman for eight seasons with the Miami Dolphins of the National Football League (NFL). He played college football for the Utah Utes. He played in three consecutive Super Bowls for the Dolphins in the 1971, 1972, and 1973 seasons. Fernandez started on the 1972 Miami Dolphin year known as "The Perfect Season," as the Dolphins won all of their games, including the playoffs and superbowl.

== Early life ==
Manuel Jose Fernandez was born in Hayward, California, on July 3, 1946. He played football, wrestled, and threw the discus at San Lorenzo High School in San Lorenzo, California.

== College career ==
Fernandez attended Chabot Junior College before enrolling at the University of Utah and playing under Utes head coach Mike Giddings. Fernandez wore number 65 at Utah and was a three-year letterman.

He went undrafted and signed with the Dolphins.

== Professional career ==
For his career Fernandez had 35 career sacks, a high number for a nose tackle, with a career high of 8 in 1971, which led the Dolphins. In Dolphin history only one nose tackle (Bob Baumhower: 39.5) recorded more sacks. Fernandez recorded 5.5 sacks in post-season play which is currently 3rd in Dolphins history behind defensive ends Kim Bokamper (8) and Trace Armstrong (6).

He was 2nd team All-Pro in 1970 and 1973, and an All-AFC selection in 1971 and a second-team All-AFC choice in 1972 and 1973, marking four consecutive season with post-season honors. Fernandez is also credited with being one of the first nose tackles in the NFL, since the Dolphins played the famed "53" defense (which was a 3–4 defense) in 1972 through 1974, which put him over the center. Likely, no team played the 3–4 defense more until the New England Patriots when went to the 3–4 full-time in 1974.

Fernandez was a strong contender for MVP of Super Bowl VII. Wrote Nick Buoniconti, "It was the game of his life–in fact, it was the most dominant game by a defensive lineman in the history of the game, and he would never be given much credit for it. They should have given out two game balls and made Manny Fernandez the co-MVP with Jake Scott." Larry Csonka also said he thought Fernandez should have been the MVP. The MVP was selected by Dick Schaap, the editor of Sport magazine. Schaap admitted later that he had been out late the previous night, struggled to watch the defense-dominated game, and was not aware that Fernandez had 17 tackles. Fernandez also recorded a sack against the Washington Redskins' quarterback Billy Kilmer.

"Winning the car never entered my mind until I heard that Jake won it," Fernandez said in the January 1974 issue of Sport magazine. "I was happy for Jake, he played a helluva game for a guy who was healthy but he had two bad shoulders."

The following year, Fernandez recorded 5 tackles and 1 sack in Super Bowl VIII against the Minnesota Vikings. Two years earlier, Fernandez recorded 6 tackles, 1 sack, and recovered a fumble in the Dolphins loss to the Dallas Cowboys. In his three Super Bowls Fernandez recorded three sacks and 28 tackles.

== Later life and death ==
In 2007, he was voted to the Dolphins All-Time team. Fernandez had previously been voted to the 1990 Dolphins Silver Anniversary Team that celebrated the Dolphins' 25 years in the NFL. From 1968 through 1973 Fernandez was voted as the Dolphins' "Outstanding Defensive Lineman", even though Pro Bowlers like Bill Stanfill and Vern Den Herder were on the same line.

In January 2001, Fernandez was named to Pro Football Weekly's All-Time Super Bowl team. In 2006, USA Today named him to their All-time Super Bowl team.

In 2013, President Barack Obama honored the entire 1972 Perfect Season Dolphins at an event in the White House, but Fernandez declined to attend. He told sports columnist Dave Hyde of Ft. Lauderdale's Sun Sentinel "I'll just say my views are diametrically opposed to the President's... Enough said. Let's leave it at that. I hope everyone enjoys the trip who goes."

On December 21, 2014, Fernandez was inducted into the Miami Dolphin Honor Roll at Sun Life Stadium. On January 30, 2014, Frank Schwab from Yahoo! Sports ranked Manny Fernandez as the tenth-best player of all time in the past 48 Super Bowls.

Fernandez died on May 24, 2026, at the age of 79.
