= Bob Kuechenberg =

American football player (1947–2019)

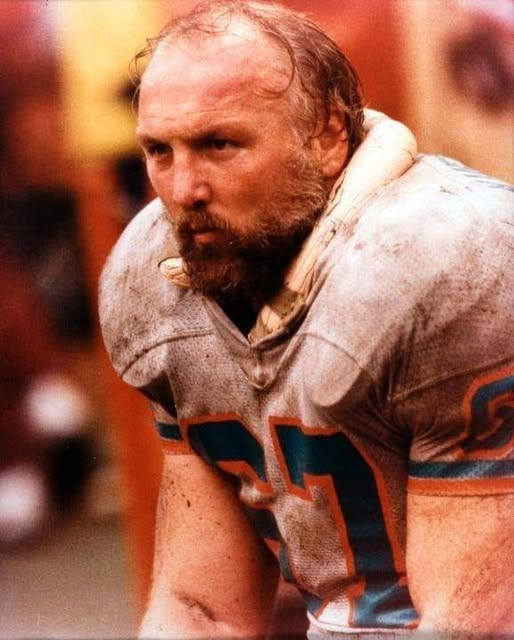
- Kuechenberg in 1983

No. 65, 67
- Positions: Guard, Tackle, Center

Personal information
- Born: October 14, 1947; Gary, Indiana, U.S.
- Died: January 12, 2019 (aged 71); Fort Lauderdale, Florida, U.S.
- Listed height: 6 ft 2 in (1.88 m)
- Listed weight: 253 lb (115 kg)

Career information
- High school: Hobart (Hobart, Indiana)
- College: Notre Dame (1965-1968)
- NFL draft: 1969: 4th round, 80th overall pick

Career history
- Philadelphia Eagles (1969)*; Chicago Owls (1969); Miami Dolphins (1970–1984)
- * Offseason or practice squad member only

Awards and highlights
- 2× Super Bowl champion (VII, VIII); 2× First-team All-Pro (1975, 1978); Second-team All-Pro (1977); 6× Pro Bowl (1974, 1975, 1977, 1978, 1982, 1983); Miami Dolphins Honor Roll; National champion (1966)

Career NFL statistics
- Games played: 196
- Games started: 176
- Fumble recoveries: 6
- Stats at Pro Football Reference

Robert John Kuechenberg (October 14, 1947 – January 12, 2019) was an American professional football player who was a guard in the National Football League (NFL) for the Miami Dolphins for 14 seasons between 1970 and 1983, spending the 1984 season on injured reserve. He was a mainstay in a line that included Hall of Famers Jim Langer, Larry Little, and Dwight Stephenson and played in six Pro Bowls in the late 1970s and early 1980s. He was selected as one of the top 15 finalists for the Pro Football Hall of Fame from 2002 to 2006, and one of the top 17 finalists from 2007 to 2009, but missed the cut every year. He was inducted into the Miami Dolphins Honor Roll on December 15, 1995. He was the brother of the retired Chicago Bears linebacker Rudy Kuechenberg.

== Early life ==
Kuechenberg was born on October 14, 1947, in Gary, Indiana to Rudy and Marion Kuechenberg, and grew up in Hobart, Indiana (located about 10 minutes from Gary and 30 minutes/35–40 miles from Chicago). He attended Hobart High School, and played football for the Hobart Brickies during high school. Kuechenberg called his father the toughest man he ever knew, and said his father had such occupations as iron worker, boxer, rodeo clown, and human cannonball. Kuechenberg himself would go on to play football with injuries that would have prevented most people from playing. Kuechenberg's older brother Rudy also attended Hobart High, would also become an NFL player, and they would be inducted together on June 23, 1996, into the Indiana Football Coaches Association Hall of Fame.

== College career ==
Kuechenberg attended college at the University of Notre Dame, where he studied economics, earning a Bachelor's degree in 1969. He played both the offensive and defensive lines for the Fighting Irish, including offensive tackle and defensive tackle on Notre Dame's 1966 National Championship team. He was a starting offensive tackle on the 1966 team. In 1968, he was the Notre Dame Defensive Lineman of Year (the Monogram Club MVP). In the same year, he was also an Honorable Mention All-American Defensive End. Kuechenberg played in the East-West and All-American Bowls. In is combined junior and senior years, he had 18 tackles for loss, broke up six passes, and recovered two fumbles. In addition to football, Kuenchenberg was third baseman on school's baseball team.

== Professional career ==
Kuechenberg was drafted 80th overall by the Philadelphia Eagles as a fourth-round pick in the 1969 NFL/AFL draft. He quit shortly after training camp started and played a season with the Chicago Owls in the Continental Football League. Kuechenberg signed with the Dolphins as a free agent in 1970. He became a starter that season, starting 5 out of 14 games played, as the Dolphins finished 10–4 and made the playoffs for the first time in club history. During the next regular season, 1971, Kuechenberg helped the Dolphins make it to the Super Bowl, where they lost to the Dallas Cowboys 24–3.

The next two seasons the Dolphins won the Super Bowl (going 17–0 in 1972) and his play was noticed by New York Post writer Paul Zimmerman, who named Kuechenberg on his All-pro ballot. The following season, 1974, he was named All-AFC by Pro Football Weekly and was named to his first Pro Bowl. In total, he would play in six Pro Bowls 1974–1975, 1977–1978, 1982–1983. He was named 1st team All-Pro in 1975 and in 1978 and was named All-AFC three times. He was Second-team All-Pro in 1977. He played in four Super Bowls (in 1971, 1972, 1973, and 1982), winning in 1972 and 1973. He was a team captain from 1980 to 1984. In 1995, he was inducted into the Miami Dolphins Honor Roll. His 19 playoff games are the most in Dolphins' history.

Kuechenberg was sometimes critical of his past teams. One such critique prompted then-current Miami All-Pro, Jason Taylor, to comment, "It's another chapter in the grumpy Kuechenberg story. It's Kuechenberg. He gets up every year and complains about something. If it ain't one thing, it's another. He needs a hug and a hobby. It's ridiculous."

Kuechenberg was inducted into the American Football Association's Semi Pro Football Hall of Fame in 1986. In 2013, President Barack Obama honored the entire 1972 Perfect Season Dolphins at an event in the White House, but Kuechenberg declined to attend for political reasons. He told sports columnist Dave Hyde of Ft. Lauderdale's Sun-Sentinel "I want to be careful, because Mom said if you have nothing good to say about someone, then don't say anything. I don't have anything good to say about someone."

In 2014, he was inducted into the Chicagoland Sports Hall of Fame, and was given its George Connor Lifetime Achievement Award. The Professional Football Researchers Association named Kuechenberg to the PRFA Hall of Very Good Class of 2013. He was a finalist on a number of occasions for the Hall of Fame, but has not made it. As of October 22, 2024, he remained a candidate in the seniors category for inclusion in the hall of fame class for 2025. He did not make the final round.

== Health and death ==
Kuechenberg played with various significant injuries. He played Super Bowl VIII with a fractured arm. He completed a game against the Pittsburgh Steelers, even though he had suffered a broken ankle. He played much of 1977 with two bone fractures in his back. His career ended after an eye injury in 1983. Legendary New York Times sportswriter Red Smith quoted Kuechenberg in 1975, on his sacrifice and strategy for success against opposing defensive tackles: "'I just fight him .... As long as he's beating on my head and not the quarterback's it's all right with me.'"

He was one of at least 345 NFL players to be diagnosed after death with chronic traumatic encephalopathy (CTE), which is caused by repeated hits to the head. He was diagnosed posthumously, and among six Dolphins from the 1972 team diagnosed with CTE (Kuechenberg, Jim Kiick, Jake Scott, Bill Stanfill, Earl Morrall and Nick Buoniconti). More recently, another 15 Dolphins have been discovered to have had CTE. Kuechenberg likely had thousands of head hits during the years he played football. After his death and CTE diagnosis, researchers asked his daughter if the family knew how many concussions Kuechenberg suffered. She told them "'His head was his tool. ... Do that math over college and high school.'" She stated that her father declined rapidly in the years leading to his death, his memory beginning to fail, rarely leaving home, making poor financial decisions, drinking heavily, suffering from depression and contemplating suicide.

He died of a heart attack on January 12, 2019.
