= 1975 All-Pro Team =

Official list of the best NFL players in 1975

The 1975 All-Pro Team is composed of the National Football League players that were named to the Associated Press, Newspaper Enterprise Association, Pro Football Writers Association, and Pro Football Weekly All-Pro Teams in 1975. Both first- and second- teams are listed for the AP, NEA, and PFWA teams. These are the four All-Pro teams that are included in the Total Football II: The Official Encyclopedia of the National Football League and compose the Consensus All-pro team for 1975.

== Teams ==
Offense
Position	First team	Second team
Quarterback	Fran Tarkenton, Minnesota Vikings (AP, NEA, PFWA, PFW)	Ken Anderson, Cincinnati Bengals (AP-2, NEA-2, PFWA-2)
Running back	Chuck Foreman, Minnesota Vikings (AP, NEA, PFWA, PFW); O. J. Simpson, Buffalo Bills (AP, NEA, PFWA, PFW)	Terry Metcalf, St. Louis Cardinals (AP-2, NEA-2, PFWA-2); Franco Harris, Pittsburgh Steelers (AP-2, NEA-2, PFWA-2)
Wide receiver	Cliff Branch, Oakland Raiders (AP, NEA); Mel Gray, St. Louis Cardinals (AP, PFWA, PFW); Isaac Curtis, Cincinnati Bengals (NEA, PFW); Lynn Swann, Pittsburgh Steelers (PFWA)	Mel Gray, St. Louis Cardinals (NEA-2); Cliff Branch, Oakland Raiders (PFWA-2); Lynn Swann, Pittsburgh Steelers (AP-2, NEA-2); Isaac Curtis, Cincinnati Bengals (AP-2, PFWA-2)
Tight end	Charle Young, Philadelphia Eagles (NEA, PFWA, PFW); Riley Odoms, Denver Broncos (AP)	Rich Caster, New York Jets (PFWA-2); Charle Young, Philadelphia Eagles (AP-2); Riley Odoms, Denver Broncos (NEA-2)
Tackle	Ron Yary, Minnesota Vikings (AP, NEA, PFWA, PFW); George Kunz, Baltimore Colts (AP, PFW); Dan Dierdorf, St. Louis Cardinals (PFWA); Rayfield Wright, Dallas Cowboys (NEA)	Dan Dierdorf, St. Louis Cardinals (AP-2, NEA-2); George Kunz, Baltimore Colts (PFWA-2); Art Shell, Oakland Raiders (AP-2, NEA-2, PFWA-2)
Guard	Joe DeLamielleure, Buffalo Bills (AP, PFWA, PFW); Larry Little, Miami Dolphins (AP, PFWA, PFW); Bob Kuechenberg, Miami Dolphins (NEA); Ed White, Minnesota Vikings (NEA)	Gene Upshaw, Oakland Raiders (AP-2); Reggie McKenzie, Buffalo Bills (AP-2); Tom Mack, Los Angeles Rams (NEA-2, PFWA-2); Larry Little, Miami Dolphins (NEA-2); Bob Kuechenberg, Miami Dolphins (PFWA-2)
Center	Jim Langer, Miami Dolphins (AP, NEA, PFWA, PFW)	Len Hauss, Washington Redskins (AP-2); Jack Rudnay, Kansas City Chiefs (NEA-2); Bob Johnson, Cincinnati Bengals (PFWA-2)

Special teams
Position	First team	Second team
Kicker	Jim Bakken, St. Louis Cardinals (AP, NEA, PFWA, PFW)	Jan Stenerud, Kansas City Chiefs (AP-2, NEA-2, PFWA-2)
Punter	Ray Guy, Oakland Raiders (NEA, PFWA, PFW)	Jerrel Wilson, Kansas City Chiefs (NEA-2); Neil Clabo, Minnesota Vikings (PFWA-2)
Kick Returner	Billy "White Shoes" Johnson, Houston Oilers (PFW)	

Defense
Position	First team	Second team
Defensive end	L. C. Greenwood, Pittsburgh Steelers (AP, NEA, PFWA, PFW); Jack Youngblood, Los Angeles Rams (AP, NEA, PFWA, PFW)	John Dutton, Baltimore Colts (AP-2, PFWA-2); Elvin Bethea, Houston Oilers (AP-2, NEA-2); Cedrick Hardman, San Francisco 49ers (NEA-2); Dwight White, Pittsburgh Steelers (PFWA-2)
Defensive tackle	Alan Page, Minnesota Vikings (AP, PFWA, PFW); Curley Culp, Houston Oilers (AP, NEA PFWA, PFW); Wally Chambers, Chicago Bears (NEA)	Wally Chambers, Chicago Bears (AP-2, PFWA-2); Alan Page, Minnesota Vikings (NEA-2); Joe Greene, Pittsburgh Steelers (AP-2, NEA-2, PFWA-2)
Middle linebacker	Jack Lambert, Pittsburgh Steelers (PFWA, PFW); Bill Bergey, Philadelphia Eagles (AP); Willie Lanier, Kansas City Chiefs (NEA)	Jack Lambert, Pittsburgh Steelers (AP-2); Bill Bergey, Philadelphia Eagles (NEA-2); Willie Lanier Kansas City Chiefs (PFWA-2)
Outside linebacker	Jack Ham, Pittsburgh Steelers (AP, NEA, PFWA, PFW); Isiah Robertson, Los Angeles Rams (NEA, PFW-t); Chris Hanburger, Washington Redskins (AP); Phil Villapiano, Oakland Raiders (PFW-t); Andy Russell, Pittsburgh Steelers (PFWA)	Fred Carr, Green Bay Packers (NEA-2); Phil Villapiano, Oakland Raiders (AP-2); Chris Hanburger, Washington Redskins (NEA-2, PFWA-2); Isiah Robertson, Los Angeles Rams (AP-2, PFWA-2)
Cornerback	Mel Blount, Pittsburgh Steelers (AP, NEA, PFWA, PFW); Roger Wehrli, St. Louis Cardinals (AP, PFWA, PFW); Emmitt Thomas, Kansas City Chiefs (NEA)	Emmitt Thomas, Kansas City Chiefs (AP-2); Lemar Parrish, Cincinnati Bengals (NEA-2); Bobby Bryant, Minnesota Vikings (PFWA-2); Roger Wehrli, St. Louis Cardinals (NEA-2); Ken Riley, Cincinnati Bengals (AP-2, PFWA-2)
Safety	Ken Houston, Washington Redskins (AP, NEA, PFWA, PFW); Paul Krause, Minnesota Vikings (AP, PFWA, PFW); Cliff Harris, Dallas Cowboys (NEA)	Jake Scott, Miami Dolphins (AP-2, PFWA-2); Dave Elmendorf, Los Angeles Rams (AP-2, NEA-2); Paul Krause, Minnesota Vikings (NEA-2); Cliff Harris, Dallas Cowboys (PFWA-2)

== Key ==
- AP = Associated Press first-team All-Pro
- AP-2 = Associated Press second-team All-Pro
- NEA = Newspaper Enterprise Association first-team All-Pro team
- NEA-2 = Newspaper Enterprise Association second-team All-Pro team
- PFW = Pro Football Weekly All-Pro team
- PFWA = Pro Football Writers Association All-NFL
