= Jim Langer =

American football player (1948–2019)

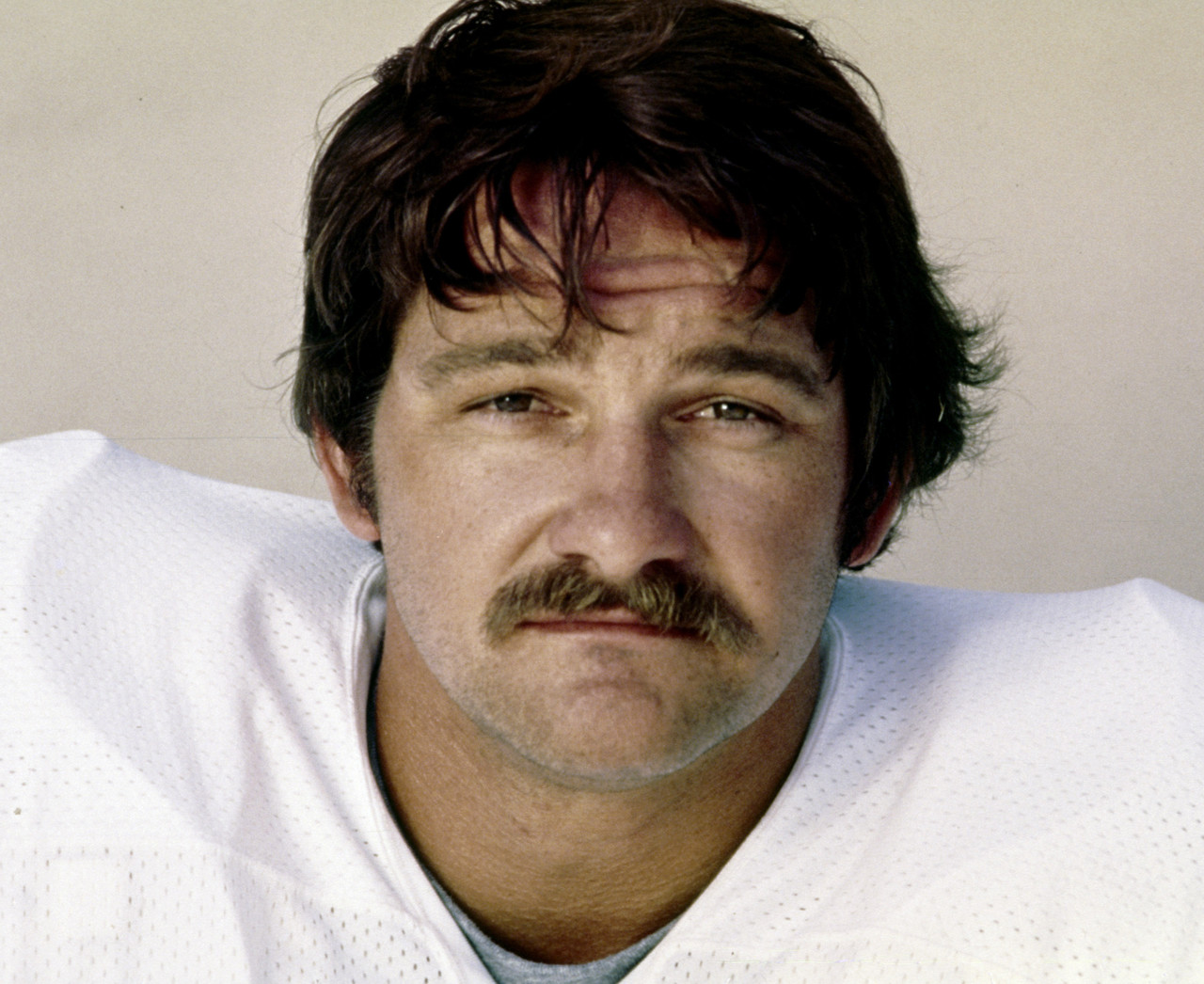
- Langer in 1969

No. 62, 58
- Positions: Center, Guard

Personal information
- Born: May 16, 1948; Little Falls, Minnesota, U.S.
- Died: August 29, 2019 (aged 71); Coon Rapids, Minnesota, U.S.
- Listed height: 6 ft 2 in (1.88 m)
- Listed weight: 250 lb (113 kg)

Career information
- High school: Royalton (MN)
- College: South Dakota State
- NFL draft: 1970: undrafted

Career history
- Cleveland Browns (1970)*; Miami Dolphins (1970–1979); Minnesota Vikings (1980–1981)
- * Offseason or practice squad member only

Awards and highlights
- 2× Super Bowl champion (VII, VIII); 3× First-team All-Pro (1974, 1975, 1977); 3× Second-team All-Pro (1973, 1976, 1978); 6× Pro Bowl (1973–1978); NFL 1970s All-Decade Team; Miami Dolphins Honor Roll; Dolphins Walk of Fame (2011)

Career NFL statistics
- Games played: 151
- Games started: 110
- Fumble recoveries: 2
- Stats at Pro Football Reference
- Pro Football Hall of Fame

James John Langer (May 16, 1948 – August 29, 2019) was an American professional football player who was a center and guard in the National Football League (NFL) for the Miami Dolphins and Minnesota Vikings. BBC Sport reported him as one of the greatest centers in NFL history. Langer was elected to the Pro Football Hall of Fame in his first year of eligibility in 1987.

He is one of only five Dolphins players to get elected to the Hall of Fame in their first year of eligibility; the others being Dan Marino, Don Shula, Paul Warfield, and Jason Taylor.

== College career ==
Langer was a native of Little Falls, Minnesota. He spent his early life at Royalton and graduated from the Royalton High School in 1966. He played middle linebacker at South Dakota State University, where in 1969 he was Honorable Mention All-America. He also played on the team's offensive line, alternating between the tackle and guard positions.

Langer also excelled at baseball, making a second-team All-America selection as an outfielder in his junior season. He led the team in hitting, field and pitching as the Jacks won a share of the North Central Conference title.

After graduating South Dakota State University with a B.S. in economics, he was signed by the Cleveland Browns as a free agent in 1970, but was cut during training camp. Langer signed as a free agent with the Miami Dolphins and saw limited action for his first 2 seasons.

== Professional career ==
=== Miami Dolphins ===
In Langer's first two years in Miami he played sparingly behind veteran center Bob DeMarco but in 1972, DeMarco was traded to Cleveland during the pre-season and Langer became the starter at center in the 1972 season. Between 1970 and 1979, he played 128 consecutive games for the Dolphins. Among these games were the 1972 and 1973 Super Bowl victories.

In 1972, during Super Bowl VII he played every offensive snap. The Dolphins win–loss figure in the season was 17-0 when it won the Super Bowl VII. The 1972 Dolphins are still the only unbeaten, untied team in the history of the league.

In 1973, during the Super Bowl VIII, the Dolphins again became the champions after they defeated the Vikings 24–7. Langer played a decisive role in the game where the ball was run 53 times for 196 yards by the Dolphins.

During a 6-year stretch in the mid-1970s, Langer was named AP First-team All-Pro 3 times 1974, 1975, and 1977, and Second-team Team All-Pro thrice, in 1973, 1976, and 1978. He also appeared in the Pro Bowl each of those seasons. Langer played in three Super Bowls with the Dolphins, losing in Super Bowl VI, but winning in Super Bowl VII and Super Bowl VIII. In 1975, he was voted as the Dolphins' most valuable player while serving as an offensive lineman. He played ten seasons with the Dolphins. A knee injury ended his playing days with Miami nine games into the 1979 season with seven games still left.

=== Minnesota Vikings ===
Langer wanted to stay closer to his home, and was accordingly traded to the Minnesota Vikings prior to the 1980 season, playing his final 2 NFL seasons with them before retiring after the 1981 campaign. He played 22 games as a Viking player from his overall 151 games. He also made one of his total 110 starts with the Vikings.

His final participation in the NFL was in 1981. By this time, Langer was a six-time Pro Bowler, four-time first-team All-Pro and two-time Super Bowl champion.

=== Post NFL career ===
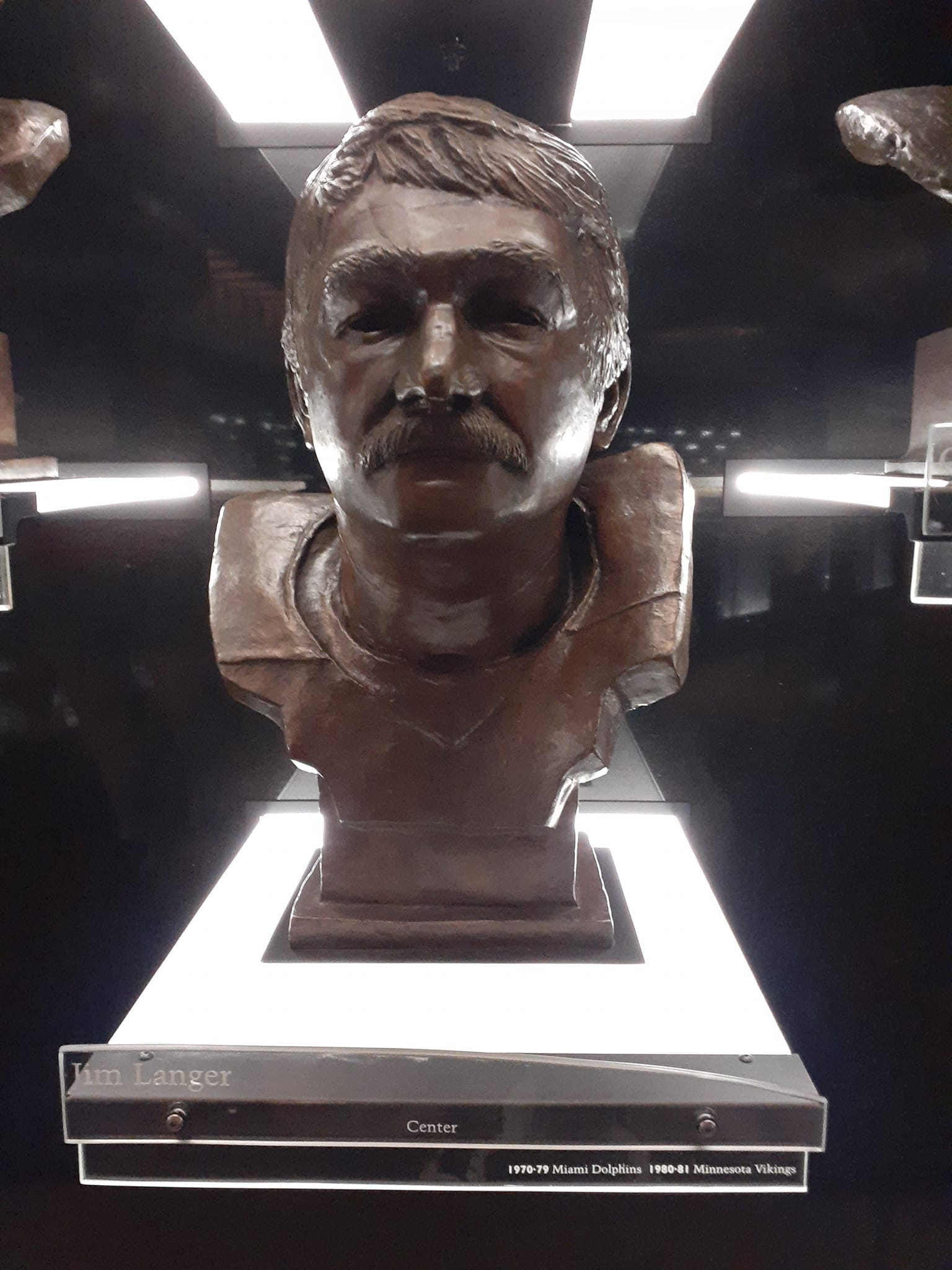
Langer's bronze bust at the Pro Football Hall of Fame

Around the middle of the decade of 1980s, he worked in the WJON AM 1240 radio station as a broadcaster. He handled the color commentator duties for the football broadcasts of St. Cloud State University Huskies.

Langer was inducted to the Dolphins Honor Roll and in the Dolphins Walk of Fame.

The Jim Langer Award, which is presented to the nation's top NCAA Division II lineman, is named after him.

In 2016, the football field of Royalton High School was named after Langer. It is one of 97 high school football fields in America to be named an NFL Hometown Hall of Fame field.

== Personal life ==
He lived in Ramsey, Minnesota, had married Linda and had four children.

In 2013, President Barack Obama honored the entire 1972 Perfect Season Dolphins at an event in the White House, but Langer declined to attend for political reasons. He told sports columnist Dave Hyde of Ft. Lauderdale's Sun-Sentinel "We've got some real moral compass issues in Washington... I don't want to be in a room with those people and pretend I'm having a good time. I can't do that. If that [angers] people, so be it."

According to his wife Linda, Langer died on August 29, 2019, at a hospital near his home in Coon Rapids, Minnesota because of a sudden heart-related issue.

To honor his contributions, the Hall of Fame flag was flown at half-staff in Canton, Ohio. Langer's death made him the third player from the 1972 Dolphins team to die in 2019, along with Bob Kuechenberg and Nick Buoniconti.
