= George Kunz =

American football player (born 1947)

- Kunz in 1972

No. 75
- Position: Offensive tackle

Personal information
- Born: July 5, 1947 (age 79); Fort Sheridan, Illinois, U.S.
- Listed height: 6 ft 5 in (1.96 m)
- Listed weight: 257 lb (117 kg)

Career information
- High school: Loyola (Los Angeles, California)
- College: Notre Dame
- NFL draft: 1969: 1st round, 2nd overall pick

Career history
- Atlanta Falcons (1969–1974); Baltimore Colts (1975–1978, 1980)

Awards and highlights
- 3× First-team All-Pro (1972, 1973, 1975); 2× Second-team All-Pro (1976, 1977); 7× Pro Bowl (1969, 1971–1973, 1975–1977); National champion (1966); Consensus All-American (1968)

Career NFL statistics
- Games played: 129
- Games started: 126
- Fumble recoveries: 3
- Stats at Pro Football Reference

George James Kunz (/ˈkuːnz/ KOONZ; born July 5, 1947) is an American former professional football player who was an offensive lineman in the National Football League (NFL) from 1969 to 1978, 1980. He played college football with the Notre Dame Fighting Irish, earning consensus All-American honors in 1968. He played with the Atlanta Falcons (1969 to 1974) and Baltimore Colts (1975 to 1978, 1980) in the NFL. He suffered a career derailing back injury in the first game of the 1978 season and did not play another game until the 1980 season.

Kunz was selected in the first round of the 1969 NFL/AFL draft with the second overall pick. He was selected to play in the Pro Bowl during his rookie season, and seven times in total over his first nine seasons (1969 to 1977). During that nine-year period, Kunz also was named a first- or second-team All-Pro five times. He was also named as an Offensive Lineman of the Year in 1976 and 1977.

In his later years Kunz has worked as an attorney practicing in Las Vegas, Nevada.

== Early life ==
Kunz was born on July 5, 1947, in Fort Sheridan, Illinois. Kunz later lived in Arcadia, California and attended Loyola High School in Los Angeles. He had been enrolled in minor seminary for two years before joining Loyola's football team as a "walk-on" in 1962; never having played organized football. Kunz learned quickly and went on to play both offensive and defensive tackle for Loyola. Kunz regularly played defense as a junior in 1963. He was named All-Catholic League at tackle as a junior, on a Loyola team that was the CIF champion in 1963. As a senior in 1964, the 6 ft 4 in (1.93 m) 225 lb (102.1 kg) Kunz was selected first-team 1964 All-California Interscholastic Federation (CIF) AAAA, at tackle. He played both on offense and defense in 1964. He was selected to play in the California high school North-South Shrine Game.

== College career ==
Kunz was recruited by and attended the University of Notre Dame. He was heavily recruited by college football programs across the United States, including among others the USC Trojans, UCLA Bruins, and Princeton Tigers. Kunz played tackle for most of his college career with the Fighting Irish. In his sophomore season (1966), Kunz was originally Notre Dame's second-team tight end. He was switched to starting offensive tackle before the season began when starting tackle Rudy Konieczny was injured. Kunz suffered a knee injury early in the second game of the 1966 season, while starting at tackle; and missed Notre Dame's remaining games that year. The 1966 Notre Dame team was ranked No. 1 by the Associated Press (AP) at the end of the season.

In 1967, coach Ara Parseghian made the 6 ft 5 in (1.96 m) 250 lb (113.4 kg) Kunz a starting tight end for the first two games of the season, until converting him back to tackle. Kunz dropped passes in his first game, but caught seven passes for 101 yards in his second game, against the Purdue Boilermakers. Before the season's third game, All-American defensive end Kevin Hardy was lost to injury, and Parseghian replaced him with offensive tackle Bob Kuechenberg. Coach Parseghian moved Kunz back to offensive tackle to replace Kuechenberg. Notre Dame was 8–2 that season, ranking fifth in the AP poll at the end of the season.

In late November 1967, after the 1967 season ended, the team elected Kunz a 1968 co-captain. Notre Dame was 7–2–1 in 1968, and again ranked fifth in the AP's final poll. Kunz was a 1968 consensus first-team All-American. In addition he was a National Football Foundation Scholar-Athlete honoree in 1968, an Academic All-American in 1968, and recipient of the NCAA post-graduate scholarship award (created in 1964). Kunz also received Notre Dame's Byron V. Kanaley Award as the most exemplary student and leader.

Kunz played in the East-West Shrine Game, and the 1969 Chicago Charities College All-Star Game. His all-star teammates voted him an offensive co-captain for the Chicago All-Star Game, along with Notre Dame teammate Terry Hanratty. The college all-stars head coach Otto Graham approved of the players' four co-captaincy choices, observing that the four players chosen "'were not only outstanding athletes, they have been the hardest workers in our training camp'".

Kunz was regarded as the best offensive lineman of his draft class in 1969. Notre Dame head coach Ara Parseghian said of Kunz in 1969, "'Having someone like George Kunz on a team is an asset both talent-wise and spirit-wise. He has the certain something which sets him apart from the average player'".

== Professional career ==
Kunz was selected in the first round of the 1969 NFL/AFL draft by the Falcons with the second overall selection. He was selected to play in the Pro Bowl in seven of his first nine seasons (1969 to 1977). Kunz suffered a back injury in the first game of the 1978 season that derailed his career; missing the rest of the 1978 season and all of the 1979 season. He started six games in 1980, his last season.

=== Atlanta Falcons ===
Right tackle George Kunz (75) helping to keep quarterback Bob Berry upright was the featured image of the 1972 Atlanta Falcons media guide.

Kunz started all 14 games at right tackle as a rookie in 1969, and was selected to play in the Pro Bowl. He started nine games the following year, missing five games early in the season after knee surgery; returning to play 38 days after surgery. He did not miss another start at right tackle for the Falcons from 1971 to 1974, starting 56 consecutive games. In 1971, Kunz was again selected to play in the Pro Bowl. He was a bulwark of the Atlanta offense and a key part of an offensive line that limited Falcons' opponents to just 31 sacks in 1971.

Kunz was selected to the Pro Bowl again in 1972. The Newspaper Enterprise Association (NEA) named him first-team All-Pro in 1972, and United Press International (UPI) named Kunz second-team All-NFC. In 1973, he was named to the Pro Bowl for the fourth time in five years. The NEA again named him first-team All-Pro, as did Pro Football Weekly; and the Pro Football Writers of America named him second-team All-Pro in 1973. UPI named him second-team All-NFC in 1974. Kunz's teammates selected him as their players' union representative in 1974, after union representative Ken Reaves was traded. He picketed during the 1974 players' strike.

In January 1975, Kunz was traded to the Baltimore Colts as part of a draft pick-flip with the Falcons in the 1975 NFL draft. The Colts, who held the top overall pick in the draft traded it to the Falcons for Kunz plus Atlanta's first draft pick, number three overall. In addition, the Colts gave Atlanta a sixth-round pick in the deal. The Falcons used the first overall pick to select quarterback Steve Bartkowski and the sixth pick on linebacker Fulton Kuykendall in the 1975 NFL draft; while the Colts drafted guard Ken Huff with the third overall pick.

=== Baltimore Colts ===
Kunz started 12 games at right tackle in his first season with the Colts. He was selected to play in the Pro Bowl for the fifth time overall and for the first time on the AFC's team. The Associated Press (AP) and Pro Football Weekly selected him first-team All-Pro in 1975, and the Pro Football Writers named him second-team All-Pro. All three of those entities, plus The Sporting News and UPI named him first-team All-AFC.

In 1976, Kunz was named the NFL Players Association Offensive Lineman of the Year in the American Football Conference and the Seagram's Seven Crown of Sports Offensive Lineman of the Year. Kunz was again selected to the Pro Bowl, and was named an AFC Pro Bowl offensive team captain for the January 1977 Pro Bowl. He was named second-team All-Pro by the AP, NEA, and Pro Football Writers; and first-team All-AFC by the AP, Pro Football Weekly, The Sporting News and UPI.

In 1977, Kunz was the Colts' offensive co-captain. He was named to the Pro Bowl for the seventh time in nine years. He was selected second-team All-Pro by the AP and NEA, and first-team All-AFC by Pro Football Weekly, The Sporting News, and UPI. He was again named the Seagram's Seven Crown of Sports Offensive Lineman of the Year in 1977.

The Colts were 2–12 in 1974 before obtaining Kunz. During Kunz's only three full seasons playing for the Colts (1975 to 1977) the team was 31–11 and reached the playoffs each of those seasons. Kunz's presence on the offensive line and the maturing of Colts' All-Pro quarterback Bert Jones during those three seasons were reported to be the major factors in the Colts winning the AFC East Division three consecutive seasons. Kunz said those three seasons with the Colts from 1975 to 1977 were the happiest of his career.

Kunz suffered a career-changing back injury in the first game of the 1978 season, and he did not play again during the remainder of the 1978 season. He failed to pass an NFL physical examination of his back in early July 1979; and announced his retirement in July 1979 because the recurring back problems. He did not play for the Colts in 1979. Similarly, Jones played every game from 1975 to 1977, but only a few games in 1978 and 1979 due to a serious shoulder injury. The Colts were a combined 10–22 during those two seasons.

Kunz came out of retirement in 1980, seeing action in nine games with six starts for the Colts; though he recognized he could no longer play at the level he had been in 1977. He started the season's first five games, but after a variety of injuries started only one game the rest of the 1980 season. Kunz suffered another back injury during a 1980 game, losing all feeling in his legs at the time. He took this as a sign that he should retire. Kunz announced his second, and final, retirement in May 1981.

== Legacy and honors ==
The Professional Football Researchers Association named Kunz to the PRFA Hall of Very Good Class of 2014. Ted Marchibroda who coached Kunz in Baltimore, and was an NFL coach for over 30 years (12 as a head coach) is reported as saying of Kunz, "'As a lineman, he’s the best offensive leader I’ve ever been around . . . His teammates followed him. George Kunz made other players better'".

Kunz had been selected as a team captain at Notre Dame, with the Falcons, and then the Colts, and was voted AFC team captain by his peers in the Pro Bowl. Marchibroda called that "'an indication of what others thought of him'". Comparing him to offensive tackles in the Pro Football Hall of Fame, Marchibroda said that Kunz "'made as many Pro Bowls as the [Ron] Yarys, [Art] Shells and [Bob] Browns. I would rather have him than those guys. I had Bob Brown in L.A. Bob may have been a better athlete, but you can’t compare them as leaders. His [Kunz's] leadership sets him apart'". Marchibroda described Kunz's absence from the Hall of Fame as "'somehow he's fallen through the cracks'".

Kunz was among those considered for induction by the Hall of Fame seniors committee in 2025, but did not advance for final consideration. During an interview with the National Catholic Register in 2017, when asked about Hall of Fame induction, Kunz said

Sporting halls of fame aside, we should all be striving to enter the heavenly “Hall of Fame” with the saints. That’s my ultimate wish — to hear, at the end of my life, the words in Matthew 25, which are, paraphrased, “Well done, good and faithful servant. Enter into the joy of the Lord.” In the same chapter, we are informed how, when we help our fellow man in his needs, we are really helping God and that God will recognize our efforts and reward us accordingly. We each have our own ways of helping, but two things I like to do are making it possible for financially needy children to attend Catholics schools and feeding homeless people.

== Broadcast career ==
Kunz was a communications major at Notre Dame, and had a weekly radio show called "Captain's Corner". In May 1972, he appeared on local television in Atlanta, at WAGA, filling in as an early evening news sportscaster for Bill Curry. During his retirement in 1979, Kunz was a color commentator for NBC Sports. After retiring for good in early 1981, Kunz returned as a color analyst with NBC Sports for two years.

== Personal life ==
Toward the end of his career, Kunz lived in Phoenix, raising Appaloosa horses. He became a McDonald's restaurant operator after retiring, in Las Vegas, Nevada, where he was also involved with a number of charitable and community organizations. He owned two restaurants in Las Vegas. During college at Notre Dame he volunteered his services at the Northern Indiana Children's Hospital. In Las Vegas, he was instrumental in developing a Ronald McDonald House.

While at Notre Dame, he was a communications major (with a 3.4 grade point average) and had planned to go to law school. In 2007, at the urging of his wife Mary Sue, the 59-year old Kunz went back to school, enrolling in the William S. Boyd School of Law at the University of Nevada, Las Vegas. Kunz, a former Academic All-American at Notre Dame, found the transition difficult but achievable, later telling a journalist: "My first day in class I had to ask another student how to turn on my computer — I was the oldest one there. Once I got back into the flow of it, it got a little easier but football killed a lot of brain cells. The bottom line is, I wasn't at the top of my class, but I wasn't at the bottom, either".

Kunz graduated in 2010 and subsequently passed the Nevada state bar exam. He opened a legal practice in Las Vegas dealing with matters of family law, adoption, and personal injury.

Kunz's son Matt attended Notre Dame (1994 to 1998), and played football there under head coach Lou Holtz.
