= 1978 All-Pro Team =

Official list of the best NFL players in 1978

The 1978 All-Pro Team is composed of the National Football League players that were named to the Associated Press, Newspaper Enterprise Association, Pro Football Writers Association, and Pro Football Weekly All-Pro Teams in 1978. Both first- and second- teams are listed for the AP and NEA teams. These are the four All-Pro teams that were included in the Total Football II: The Official Encyclopedia of the National Football League.

== Teams ==
Offense
Position	First team	Second team
Quarterback	Terry Bradshaw, Pittsburgh Steelers (AP, PFWA, PFW); Jim Zorn, Seattle Seahawks (NEA)	Jim Zorn, Seattle Seahawks (AP-2); Terry Bradshaw, Pittsburgh Steelers (NEA-2)
Running back	Delvin Williams, Miami Dolphins (AP); Walter Payton, Chicago Bears (NEA, PFWA, PFW); Earl Campbell, Houston Oilers (AP, NEA, PFWA, PFW)	Wilbert Montgomery, Philadelphia Eagles (AP-2); Franco Harris, Pittsburgh Steelers (NEA-2); Walter Payton, Chicago Bears (AP-2); Delvin Williams, Miami Dolphins (NEA-2)
Wide receiver	Lynn Swann, Pittsburgh Steelers (AP, NEA, PFWA, PFW); Wesley Walker, New York Jets, (AP, NEA, PFWA, PFW)	Steve Largent, Seattle Seahawks (AP-2, NEA-2); John Jefferson, San Diego Chargers (AP-2, NEA-2)
Tight end	Dave Casper, Oakland Raiders (AP, NEA, PFWA, PFW)	Russ Francis, New England Patriots (AP-2, NEA-2)
Tackle	Dan Dierdorf, St. Louis Cardinals (AP, NEA, PFWA, PFW); Leon Gray, New England Patriots (AP, PFWA, PFW); Russ Washington, San Diego Chargers (NEA)	Doug France, Los Angeles Rams (AP-2, NEA-2); Art Shell, Oakland Raiders (AP-2); Leon Gray, New England Patriots (NEA-2)
Guard	John Hannah, New England Patriots (AP, NEA, PFWA, PFW); Joe DeLamielleure, Buffalo Bills (NEA, PFWA, PFW-t); Bob Kuechenberg, Miami Dolphins (AP, PFW-t)	Larry Little, Miami Dolphins (AP-2, NEA-2); Joe DeLamielleure, Buffalo Bills (AP-2); Bob Kuechenburg, Miami Dolphins (NEA-2)
Center	Mike Webster, Pittsburgh Steelers (AP, NEA, PFWA, PFW)	Jim Langer, Miami Dolphins (AP-2, NEA-2)

Special teams
Position	First team	Second team
Kicker	Frank Corral, Los Angeles Rams (NEA, PFWA, PFW); Pat Leahy, New York Jets (AP)	Mark Moseley, Washington Redskins (NEA-2); Frank Corral, Los Angeles Rams (AP-2)
Punter	Ray Guy, Oakland Raiders (AP, NEA, PFWA, PFW)	Dave Jennings, New York Giants (AP-2, NEA-2)
Kick Returner	Rick Upchurch, Denver Broncos (AP, PFWA); Tony Green, Washington Redskins (PFW)	Tony Green, Washington Redskins (AP-2)
Punt Returner	Rick Upchurch, Denver Broncos (PFW)	

Defense
Position	First team	Second team
Defensive end	Al Baker, Detroit Lions (AP, NEA, PFWA, PFW); Jack Youngblood, Los Angeles Rams (AP, NEA, PFWA, PFW)	Lyle Alzado, Denver Broncos (AP-2); Lee Roy Selmon, Tampa Bay Buccaneers (AP-2, NEA-2); Elvin Bethea, Houston Oilers (NEA-2)
Defensive tackle	Louie Kelcher, San Diego Chargers (AP, NEA, PFWA, PFW); Randy White, Dallas Cowboys (AP, NEA, PFWA, PFW)	Curley Culp, Houston Oilers (AP-2, NEA-2); Larry Brooks, Los Angeles Rams (AP-2, NEA-2)
Middle linebacker	Randy Gradishar, Denver Broncos (AP, NEA, PFWA, PFW)	Jack Lambert, Pittsburgh Steelers (NEA-2); Bill Bergey, Philadelphia Eagles (AP-2)
Outside linebacker	Robert Brazile, Houston Oilers (AP, NEA, PFWA, PFW); Jack Ham, Pittsburgh Steelers (AP, NEA, PFWA, PFW)	Tom Jackson, Denver Broncos (AP-2); Ted Hendricks, Oakland Raiders (NEA-2); Brad Van Pelt, New York Giants (NEA-2); Harry Carson, New York Giants (AP-2)
Cornerback	Willie Buchanon, Green Bay Packers (AP, PFWA, PFW); Louis Wright, Denver Broncos (AP, NEA PFWA-t, PFW); Mike Haynes, New England Patriots (NEA, PFWA-t)	Mike Haynes, New England Patriots (AP-2); Pat Thomas, Los Angeles Rams (NEA-2); Willie Buchanon, Green Bay (NEA-2); Mel Blount, Pittsburgh Steelers (AP-2)
Safety	Cliff Harris, Dallas Cowboys (AP, PFWA--t-FS, PFW); Thom Darden, Cleveland Browns (NEA, PFWA-t-FS, PFW); Charlie Waters, Dallas Cowboys (NEA, PFWA-SS); Ken Houston, Washington Redskins (AP)	Donnie Shell, Pittsburgh Steelers (NEA-2); Cliff Harris, Dallas Cowboys (NEA-2); Thom Darden, Cleveland Browns (AP-2); Charlie Waters, Dallas Cowboys (AP-2)

== Key ==
- AP = Associated Press first-team All-Pro
- AP-2 = Associated Press second-team All-Pro
- NEA = Newspaper Enterprise Association first-team All-Pro team
- NEA-2 = Newspaper Enterprise Association second-team All-Pro team
- PFW = Pro Football Weekly All-Pro team
- PFWA = Pro Football Writers Association All-NFL
