= Rick Upchurch =

American football player (born 1952)

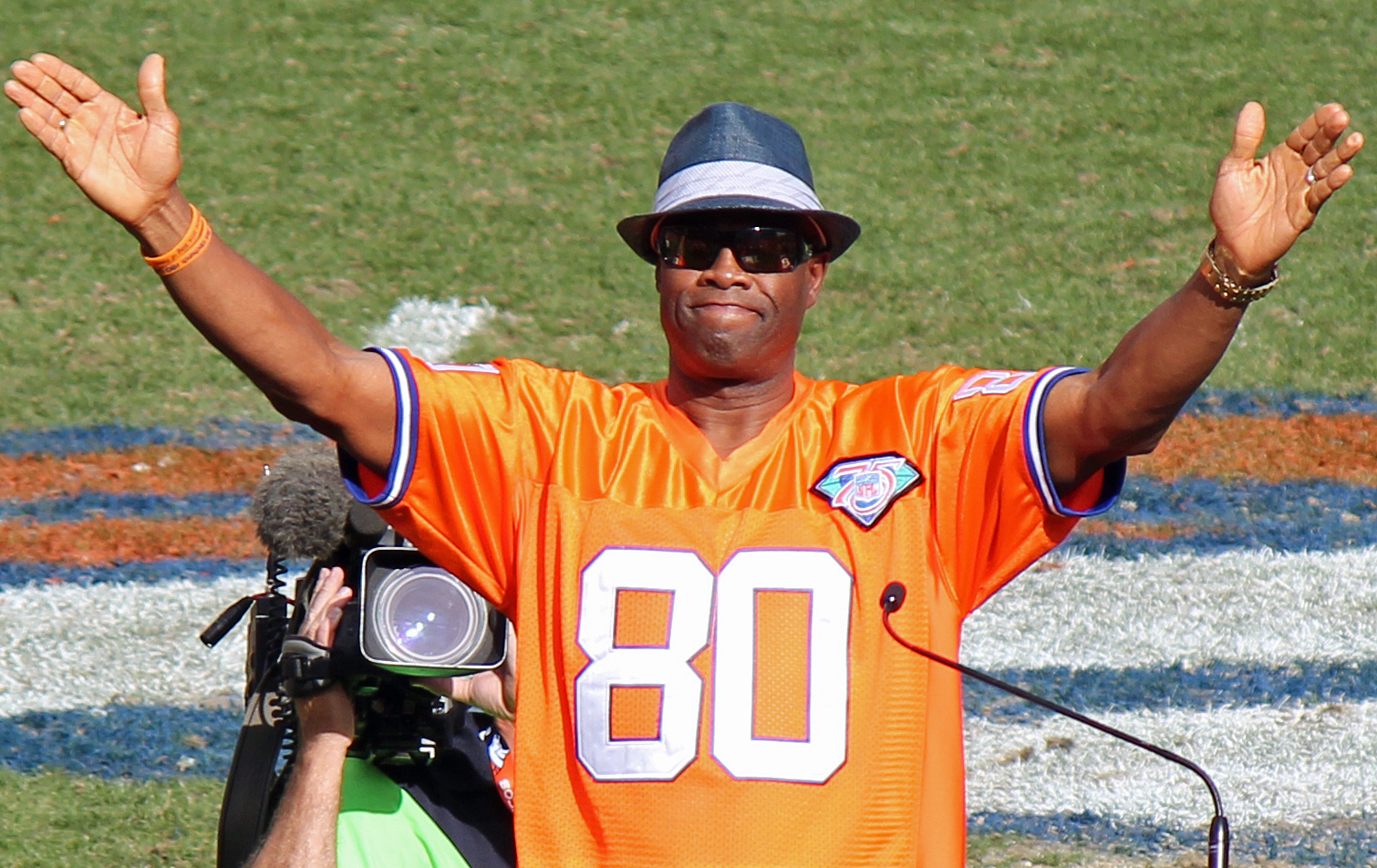
- Upchurch in 2014

No. 80
- Positions: Wide receiver, Return specialist

Personal information
- Born: May 20, 1952 (age 74); Toledo, Ohio, U.S.
- Listed height: 5 ft 10 in (1.78 m)
- Listed weight: 175 lb (79 kg)

Career information
- High school: Springfield (Holland, Ohio)
- College: Minnesota
- NFL draft: 1975: 4th round, 95th overall pick

Career history
- Denver Broncos (1975–1983)

Awards and highlights
- 3× First-team All-Pro (1976, 1978, 1982); 2× Second-team All-Pro (1977, 1979); 4× Pro Bowl (1976, 1978, 1979, 1982); NFL 1970s All-Decade Team; NFL 1980s All-Decade Team; PFWA All-Rookie Team (1975); Denver Broncos Ring of Fame; Denver Broncos 50th Anniversary Team; 2× Second-team All-Big Ten (1973, 1974)

Career NFL statistics
- Receptions: 267
- Receiving yards: 4,369
- Rushing attempts: 49
- Rushing yards: 349
- Return yards: 5,363
- Total touchdowns: 35
- Stats at Pro Football Reference

Richard Upchurch (born May 20, 1952) is an American former professional football player who was a wide receiver and return specialist in the National Football League (NFL). He played his entire career with the Denver Broncos from 1975 to 1983. One of 29 individuals to be selected to multiple All-Decade teams, Upchurch is noted as one of the greatest return specialists of all time.

== College career ==
Before his NFL career, he attended Springfield High School in Holland, Ohio, and then played for Centerville Community College in Centerville, Iowa before transferring to the University of Minnesota. In his two seasons with the Gophers, Upchurch rushed for 1,783 yards, caught 18 passes for 242 yards, and scored 18 offensive touchdowns. He averaged 6.1 yards per carry and also set a school record for return yards in a season with 305. He was enshrined in Minnesota's athletic hall of fame in 2001.

== Professional career ==
In his nine NFL seasons, Upchurch excelled as a receiver and a kick returner on special teams. In his rookie season, he rushed for 97 yards, caught eighteen passes for 436 yards, returned 27 punts for 312 yards, and added another 1,014 yards returning kickoffs. In his second season, he set an NFL record by returning four punts for touchdowns and made the Pro Bowl. In the 1977 season, he led the NFL with 653 punt return yards and assisted his team to their first ever Super Bowl appearance. The Broncos lost Super Bowl XII to the Dallas Cowboys 27–10, but he had a good performance in the game. Upchurch amassed 125 total offensive yards (94 kickoff return, 22 punt return, nine receiving), including a Super Bowl record 67-yard kickoff return in the third quarter that set up Denver's only touchdown of the game.

Upchurch stayed with the Broncos until the 1983 season. He led the NFL in punt return average twice (1978 and 1982) and was selected to the Pro Bowl three more times (1978, 1979, 1982). He finished his nine-season career with 49 carries for 349 rushing yards, 267 receptions for 4,369 yards, 248 punt returns for 3,008 yards, and 95 kickoff returns for 2,355 yards. Overall, Upchurch gained 10,081 total yards and scored 35 touchdowns: eight returning punts, 24 receiving, and three rushing. He was also selected All-Pro five times. At the time of his retirement, he was the NFL's career leader in punt return yards, and his eight punt returns for touchdowns tied the NFL record shared by Jack Christiansen. With his 12.1 yards per punt return, he is one of five players to record a career average of over twelve yards per punt return.

== NFL career statistics ==
Legend
**Bold**	Career high

Year	Team	Games		Receiving					Rushing				
Year	Team	GP	GS	Rec	Yds	Avg	Lng	TD	Att	Yds	Avg	Lng	TD
1975	DEN	14	0	18	436	24.2	**90**	2	**16**	**97**	6.1	15	**1**
1976	DEN	13	9	12	340	**28.3**	59	1	6	71	11.8	25	**1**
1977	DEN	14	1	12	245	20.4	45	2	1	19	**19.0**	19	**1**
1978	DEN	12	0	17	210	12.4	29	1	5	31	6.2	11	0
1979	DEN	**16**	**16**	**64**	**937**	14.6	47	**7**	3	17	5.7	18	0
1980	DEN	**16**	14	46	605	13.2	35	3	5	49	9.8	21	0
1981	DEN	13	10	32	550	17.2	63	3	5	56	11.2	**37**	0
1982	DEN	9	8	26	407	15.7	51	3	2	-10	-5.0	-3	0
1983	DEN	12	11	40	639	16.0	40	2	6	19	3.2	9	0
		119	69	267	4,369	16.4	90	24	49	349	7.1	37	3

== Post career ==
After his retirement, Upchurch coached football at Tabor College in Hillsboro, Kansas. In 2005, Upchurch became the head football coach at East High School in Pueblo, Colorado posting a 1–19 record in his two seasons as head coach. Upchurch currently resides in Mesquite, Nevada, and frequently visits nearby communities such as St. George, Utah, and Logandale, Nevada, to sign autographs for Broncos fans. Upchurch is ranked the sixth-greatest return specialist in NFL history on NFL Network's NFL Top 10 Return Aces.

== Legacy ==
Upchurch holds eleven Broncos franchise records, including:

- Punt returns: career (248), season (51 in 1977), game (eight on 1978-10-22 @BAL; with Trindon Holliday)
- Punt return yards: career (3,008), season (653 in 1977)
- Punt return touchdowns: career (eight), season (four in 1976), game (two on 1976-09-26 CLE; with Darrien Gordon)
- Total return yards: career (5,363), playoffs (351), playoff season (222 in 1977)

== Personal life ==
Upchurch dated and was briefly engaged to the former Secretary of State Condoleezza Rice in the 1970s. She left him because, according to her biographer Marcus Mabry, "She knew the relationship wasn't going to work." He is currently married and has four children.
