= Miami Dolphins Honor Roll =

Ring at Hard Rock Stadium honoring Miami Dolphins personnel

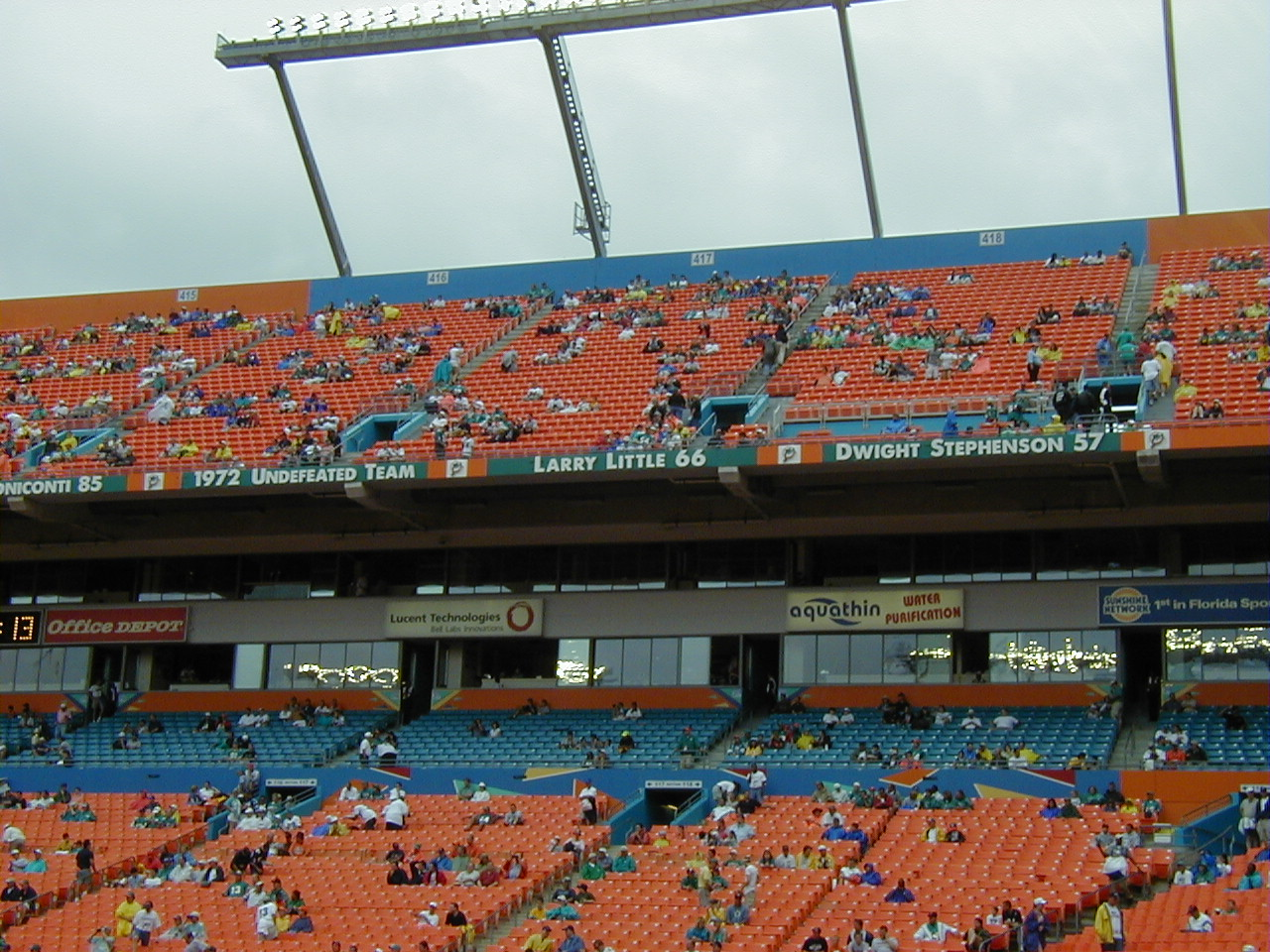
Miami Dolphins Honor Roll

The Miami Dolphins Ring of Honor is a ring around the second tier at Hard Rock Stadium in Miami Gardens, Florida, which honors former players, coaches, contributors, and officials who have made significant contributions to the Miami Dolphins franchise.

The Miami Dolphins Ring of Honor was started on September 16, 1990, with its first inductee being the owner/founder of the Miami Dolphins: Joe Robbie, who died one year prior to his induction.

Since then, 23 players, and two coaches have been inducted into the Ring of Honor, along with a special induction to honor the 1972 Undefeated Team, which was inducted in 1992 at the 20th anniversary. Inductions included a special "four individual" induction in 1990 to honor the first four Miami Dolphins Hall of Famers of Csonka, Langer, Griese, and Warfield.

There have also been special "dual" inductions: In 2003, the "Marks Brothers" of WRs Mark Clayton and Mark Duper were inducted. In 2008, a special "dual" induction honored two members of the famed "Killer B's" defense with DT Bob Baumhower and DE Doug Betters. In 2010, a "dual" induction of two defensive stars on Miami's 1972 undefeated team - S Jake Scott and DE Bill Stanfill - were inducted. In 2012, a special "dual" induction of two all-time Dolphin fan-favorites, defensive stars from the mid-late 1990s/early 2000s - LB Zach Thomas and DE Jason Taylor - were also inducted.

In 1992 at the 20th anniversary, Miami's "1972 Undefeated Team" was enshrined into the Ring of Honor. At the 40th anniversary, which enshrined former defensive coordinator Bill Arnsparger into the Ring of Honor, his name went on the Ring of Honor where the "1972 Undefeated Team" inductee previously and originally was enshrined, and an updated "1972 Perfect Season Team 17-0" inductee was put into one corner of Hard Rock Stadium with special placards of Super Bowl VII and Super Bowl VIII included next to it on each side.

In 2024, the name was switched from the Honor Roll to the Ring of Honor.

Miami Dolphins Ring of Honor inductees are chosen by current members of the Ring of Honor, as well as current franchise officials.

== Inductees ==
**Name**	**Number**	**Position**	**Years With Club**	**Date of Induction**
Joe Robbie		Founder and Owner	1966–1989	September 16, 1990
**Larry Csonka**	39 ^	FB	1968–1974, 1979	November 19, 1990
**Bob Griese**	12 ^	QB	1967–1980	November 19, 1990
**Jim Langer**	62	C	1970–1979	November 19, 1990
**Paul Warfield**	42	WR	1970–1974	November 19, 1990
**Nick Buoniconti**	85	LB	1969–1974, 1976	November 18, 1991
1972 undefeated team				November 16, 1992
**Larry Little**	66	G	1969–1980	December 16, 1993
**Dwight Stephenson**	57	C	1980–1987	December 12, 1994
Bob Kuechenberg	67	G	1970–1984	December 15, 1995
**Don Shula**	347 (number of career coaching wins)	Head coach	1970–1995	November 25, 1996
Nat Moore	89	WR	1974–1986	December 5, 1999
**Dan Marino**	13 ^	QB	1983–1999	September 17, 2000
Mark Clayton	83	WR	1983–1992	December 15, 2003
Mark Duper	85	WR	1982–1992	December 15, 2003
Dick Anderson	40	S	1968–1977	December 3, 2006
Richmond Webb	78	OT	1990–2000	December 25, 2006
Bob Baumhower	73	DT	1977–1986	December 14, 2008
Doug Betters	75	DE	1978–1987	December 14, 2008
Jake Scott	13	S	1970–1975	November 18, 2010
Bill Stanfill	84	DE	1969–1976	November 18, 2010
Jim Mandich	88	TE and Radio Broadcaster	1970–1977 / 1992–2004, 2007-2010	December 4, 2011
**Jason Taylor**	99	DE	1997–2007, 2009, 2011	October 14, 2012
**Zach Thomas**	54	LB	1996-2007	October 14, 2012
Bill Arnsparger		Defensive Coordinator	1970-1973; 1976-1983	December 16, 2012
Updated 1992 inductee: Super Bowl VII | 1972 Perfect Season Team 17-0 | Super Bowl VIII				December 16, 2012
John Offerdahl	56	LB	1986-1993	October 31, 2013
Manny Fernandez	75	DT	1968-1975	December 21, 2014
Tim Bowens	95	DT	1994-2004	October 27, 2024

^ Jersey Number Retired
Bold indicates those enshrined into the Pro Football Hall of Fame
