= NFL 1970s All-Decade Team =

Official list of the NFL's best players in the 1970s

The National Football League 1970s All-Decade Team is a list of National Football League (NFL) players selected by voters of the Pro Football Hall of Fame. The squad consists of first- and second-team offensive, defensive, and special teams units, as well as a first- and second-team head coaches.

Punter Ray Guy was the leading vote-getter for the 1970s All-Decade Team, receiving 24 of a possible 25 votes. O. J. Simpson and Lynn Swann were next with 22 and 21 votes, respectively. Linebacker Jack Ham and Tight end Dave Casper each received 20 votes. Next were Defensive end Jack Youngblood and defensive tackle Joe Greene who each had 18 votes. Players that also made the National Football League 1960s All-Decade Team (the first NFL all-decade list) were Bob Lilly, Dick Butkus, Merlin Olsen, Larry Wilson, and Jim Bakken. (Note: Willie Brown was named to two all-decade teams, as the American Football League All-Time Team (a league that merged with the NFL) covered the 1960s.) Walter Payton, John Hannah, Mike Webster, Ted Hendricks, Jack Lambert, Billy "White Shoes" Johnson, Rick Upchurch, and Chuck Noll would also be named to the 1980s All-Decade Team.

== Offense ==
*	Elected into the Pro Football Hall of Fame	¤	~	Hall of Fame Finalist

Position	First Team	Votes	Hall of Fame?	Second Team	Votes	Hall of Fame?
Quarterback	Terry Bradshaw* (Pittsburgh Steelers)	13	Yes	Roger Staubach* (Dallas Cowboys)	3	Yes
Quarterback	Terry Bradshaw* (Pittsburgh Steelers)	13	Yes	Ken Stabler* (Oakland Raiders)	3	Yes
Running back	O. J. Simpson* (Buffalo Bills, San Francisco 49ers)	22	Yes	Earl Campbell* (Houston Oilers)	8	Yes
Running back	Walter Payton* (Chicago Bears)	11	Yes	Franco Harris* (Pittsburgh Steelers)	7	Yes
Wide receiver	Lynn Swann* (Pittsburgh Steelers)	21	Yes	Paul Warfield* (Miami Dolphins, Cleveland Browns)	5	Yes
Wide receiver	Drew Pearson* (Dallas Cowboys)	7	Yes	Harold Carmichael* (Philadelphia Eagles)	2	Yes
Tight end	Dave Casper* (Oakland Raiders)	20	Yes	Charlie Sanders* (Detroit Lions)	3	Yes
Tackle	Art Shell* (Oakland Raiders)	13	Yes	Dan Dierdorf* (St. Louis Cardinals)	11	Yes
Tackle	Rayfield Wright* (Dallas Cowboys)	12	Yes	Ron Yary* (Minnesota Vikings)	5	Yes
Guard	Larry Little* (Miami Dolphins)	16	Yes	John Hannah* (New England Patriots)	9	Yes
Guard	Joe DeLamielleure* (Buffalo Bills)	12	Yes	Gene Upshaw* (Oakland Raiders)	6	Yes
Center	Jim Langer* (Miami Dolphins)	15	Yes	Mike Webster* (Pittsburgh Steelers)	6	Yes

== Defense ==
Position	First Team	Votes	Hall of Fame?	Second Team	Votes	Hall of Fame?
Defensive end	Jack Youngblood* (Los Angeles Rams)	18	Yes	L. C. Greenwood ~ (Pittsburgh Steelers)	10	7 time finalist
Defensive end	Carl Eller* (Minnesota Vikings)	11	Yes	Harvey Martin (Dallas Cowboys)	5	No
Defensive tackle	Joe Greene* (Pittsburgh Steelers)	18	Yes	Alan Page* (Minnesota Vikings, Chicago Bears)	8	Yes
Defensive tackle	Bob Lilly* (Dallas Cowboys)	16	Yes	Merlin Olsen* (Los Angeles Rams)	5	Yes
Middle linebacker	Dick Butkus* (Chicago Bears)	9	Yes	Jack Lambert* (Pittsburgh Steelers)	6	Yes
Outside linebacker	Jack Ham* (Pittsburgh Steelers)	20	Yes	Robert Brazile* (Houston Oilers)	5	Yes
Outside linebacker	Ted Hendricks* (Baltimore Colts, Green Bay Packers, Oakland Raiders)	8	Yes	Bobby Bell* (Kansas City Chiefs)	4	Yes
Cornerback	Willie Brown* (Oakland Raiders)	13	Yes	Louis Wright (Denver Broncos)	7	No
Cornerback	Jimmy Johnson* (San Francisco 49ers)	8	Yes	Roger Wehrli* (St. Louis Cardinals)	7	Yes
Safety	Ken Houston* (Houston Oilers, Washington Redskins)	16	Yes	Larry Wilson* (St. Louis Cardinals)	7	Yes
Safety	Cliff Harris* (Dallas Cowboys)	15	Yes	Dick Anderson (Miami Dolphins)	3	No

== Special teams ==
Position	First Team	Votes	Hall of Fame?	Second Team	Votes	Hall of Fame?
Kicker	Garo Yepremian (Miami Dolphins, New Orleans Saints)	8	No	Jim Bakken (St. Louis Cardinals)	7	No
Punter	Ray Guy* (Oakland Raiders)	24	Yes	Jerrel Wilson (Kansas City Chiefs)	1	No
Kick Returner	Rick Upchurch (Denver Broncos)	10	No	Billy "White Shoes" Johnson (Houston Oilers)	6	No

== Coach ==
Position	First Team	Votes	Hall of Fame?	Second Team	Votes	Hall of Fame?
Coach	Don Shula* (Miami Dolphins)	11	Yes	Chuck Noll* (Pittsburgh Steelers)	9	Yes
