= Bill Bergey =

American football player (1945–2024)

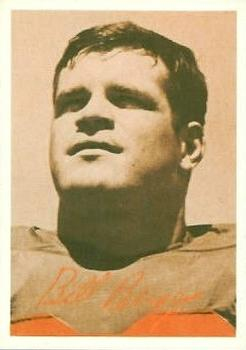
- Bergey with the Cincinnati Bengals in 1969

No. 66
- Position: Linebacker

Personal information
- Born: February 9, 1945; South Dayton, New York, U.S.
- Died: December 25, 2024 (aged 79); Chadds Ford, Pennsylvania, U.S.
- Listed height: 6 ft 4 in (1.93 m)
- Listed weight: 243 lb (110 kg)

Career information
- High school: Pine Valley (South Dayton)
- College: Arkansas State
- NFL draft: 1969: 2nd round, 31st overall pick

Career history
- Cincinnati Bengals (1969-1973); Philadelphia Eagles (1974–1980)

Awards and highlights
- 2× First-team All-Pro (1974, 1975); 3× Second-team All-Pro (1976–1978); 5× Pro Bowl (1969, 1974, 1976–1978); AFL Defensive Rookie of the Year (1969); Cincinnati Bengals 50th Anniversary Team; Philadelphia Eagles Hall of Fame; Philadelphia Sports Hall of Fame; First-team Little All-American (1968)

Career NFL/AFL statistics
- Fumble recoveries: 21
- Interceptions: 27
- Sacks: 18.5
- Stats at Pro Football Reference

William Earl Bergey (February 9, 1945 – December 25, 2024) was an American professional football linebacker who played for 12 seasons, most notably with the Philadelphia Eagles of the National Football League (NFL). He was selected by the Cincinnati Bengals of the American Football League (AFL) in the 1969 NFL/AFL draft, the year before the AFL–NFL merger was completed and continued to play with the Bengals in the NFL until 1973. Bergey signed with the Eagles the following year, where he played seven seasons until retiring in 1981.

During his career, Bergey received five Pro Bowl and two first-team All-Pro selections and made an appearance in Super Bowl XV, his final professional game. He is an inductee of the Eagles Hall of Fame and the Philadelphia Sports Hall of Fame.

== Early life and education ==
Bergey was born in South Dayton, New York, on February 9, 1945. He graduated from Pine Valley Central High School in South Dayton in 1964, and graduated from Arkansas State University (ASU), where he played under coach Bernie Ellender. He was an All-American for the Arkansas State Indians (now Red Wolves) and has since been voted by fans the Top Player in Arkansas State history. He was a charter member of Delta Eta chapter of Kappa Alpha Order at ASU. He graduated in 1969 with a Bachelor of Science degree in physical education, and a commission in the Army Reserves.

Originally positioned at offensive lineman and noseguard, he was moved to linebacker in 1966. At ASU, Bergey set records for best tackling average in a season, most fumble recoveries in a season, most tackles in a game, most tackles in a season, and most career tackles. He once had 33 tackles in a single game, and averaged 19.6 tackles per game in 1968.

He played in three post-season all-star games during his ASU career (the Senior Bowl, the North–South Game, and one of the last Chicago All-Star Games, against the New York Jets). Bergey was selected to the All-Southland Conference team three times and to the Southland Conference All-First Decade Team. Bergey's jersey number 66 was retired by ASU, and he was the first person to go up on its Wall of Fame. He was inducted into ASU's Hall of Honor in 1982. Despite the accolades, Bergey's southern schoolmates would physically fight with the "Yankee" from Western New York, and his actual time at ASU in Jonesboro was difficult.

== Professional career ==
=== Cincinnati Bengals ===
Bergey was drafted by the American Football League's Cincinnati Bengals in the second round of the 1969 NFL/AFL draft, the 31st overall selection. He was chosen as an AFL All-Star in his rookie year, for the game held on January 17, 1970. He had two interceptions for the Bengals in his rookie year. For his efforts as a rookie, he was named the AFL Defensive Rookie of the Year by the Associated Press, the final selections made for the AFL as a league prior to the merger.

Bergey played under Hall of Fame coach Paul Brown at Cincinnati. He recorded three interceptions in the 1970 season, the first year for the team in the NFL. The Bengals made the postseason that year, losing to the Baltimore Colts in the divisional round 17–0, but Bergey did not record a statistic. He recorded a fumble recovery to go with an unofficial "sack". He recorded an interception in his next two combined seasons (1971–1972). In his final season with Cincinnati in 1973, he had three interceptions and recovered three fumbles.

=== Florida Blazers and trade to Philadelphia Eagles ===
Bergey signed a personal service contract on April 17, 1974, with the Washington Capitols, the owner of the World Football League (WFL)'s Virginia Ambassadors, which would later become the Florida Blazers once the circuit began play in July of that year. He was to have joined the WFL team in May 1976, after his contract with the Cincinnati Bengals expired following the 1975 season. However, the Bengals filed suit against Bergey for breach of contract and a temporary restraining order against the WFL and its franchises two days later on April 19. In the hearing, which began on April 29 and was adjudicated 15 days later on May 14, the court concluded that Bergey had not breached his contract and the Bengals' motion for a temporary injunction was denied.

Bergey did not receive compensation from the Blazers and was released from his WFL contract. He was traded from the Bengals to the Philadelphia Eagles for a 1977 first-round selection, Wilson Whitley, and first- and second-round picks in 1978, Ross Browner and Ray Griffin respectively, on July 10, 1974.

In July 1974, Bergey signed a five-year contract with the Eagles. The Blazers ceased operating following the 1974 season, and the WFL itself ceased business in 1975.

=== Philadelphia Eagles ===
Bergey played a key role in the Eagles' subsequent rise, culminating in the trip to Super Bowl XV. With the Eagles, Bergey, a four-time Pro Bowl selection as an Eagle (1974, 1976–1978), set the NFL record for most interceptions by a linebacker and became the highest-paid defensive player in the league with a four-year contract for $1 million. He earned Eagles MVP status three times from the votes of his teammates. In his first year with the Eagles, Bergey was runner up to "Mean" Joe Greene for defensive player of the year.

Bergey played 91 games as an Eagle, and started every game in six of the seven years in Philadelphia, with 18 interceptions and 15 fumble recoveries. Bergey recorded 233 tackles in a single season with the Eagles, and once held the league record for interceptions by a linebacker with five. He was a popular player who was the foundation of the "Gang Green" defense that brought the Eagles back to the playoffs in 1978, 1979 and 1980. They went all the way to the Super Bowl in 1981 after winning the NFC championship game against the Dallas Cowboys 20–7 in the 1980 season. He suffered a serious knee injury in 1979. He returned in 1980, but it would be Bergey's last season. His ability level was reduced by the injury (he evaluated it at 65%), and he could no longer reach runners in time to make the play; but he was still named All NFC by the Sporting News and went to the Super Bowl.

Bergey played 159 games and recorded nearly 1,200 tackles. He was first- or second-team All Pro/All NFL or All-NFC from 1974 to 1978 (1974 All-Pro Team, 1975 All-Pro Team, 1976 All-Pro Team, 1977 All-Pro Team, 1978 All-Pro Team). He finished his career with 27 interceptions that he returned for 397 yards, 16 unofficial sacks (beginning in 1970), and 21 fumble recoveries.

Bergey had conflicts with guard Conrad Dobler of the Eagles' NFC East rival St. Louis Cardinals, who once spit on him while he was downed and injured. His and Dobler's volatile relationship was ranked by NFL Films at No. 9 on the NFL Top 10 list of feuds.

Bergey retired from professional football in 1981, his last game being Super Bowl XV. He was inducted into the Eagles Roll of Honor in 1988 with Tommy McDonald. In 2012, the Professional Football Researchers Association named Bergey to the PFRA Hall of Very Good Class of 2012. He is considered one of the top Eagles of all time. He was inducted into the Philadelphia Sports Hall of Fame in 2011. The same year, the Philadelphia Sports Writers Association recognized Bergey with its Living Legend Award.

== Personal life and death ==
During his playing days, Bergey served as a lieutenant in the U.S. Army Reserve.

Bergey served as a color commentator on radio broadcasts of the Philadelphia Eagles from 1982 to 1983. He also provided pre-game and post-game radio and television commentary for the team during the season for over 20 years.

Bergey was a plaintiff in the concussion related lawsuit against the NFL filed and settled in a Philadelphia federal court.

Bergey later lived in Chadds Ford, Pennsylvania with his wife Micky Kay. He had three sons and multiple grandchildren. He is a member of the Greater Buffalo Sports Hall of Fame (2004). In 1989, he became a member of the Chautauqua Sports Hall of Fame.

His son Jake Bergey is a retired lacrosse player for the Philadelphia Wings of the National Lacrosse League and his son Josh Bergey is a retired lacrosse player for the Chesapeake Bayhawks of the Major League Lacrosse. Bill's brother Bruce Bergey was a standout player for the Portland Storm of the WFL.

In the film Silver Linings Playbook, Robert De Niro's character Pat Solitano Sr., an Eagles fanatic, wears a number 66 Bill Bergey jersey.

Bergey was diagnosed with oral cancer in 2021 and determinedly fought in response to the disease, finding encouragement and inspiration from others, including former Buffalo Bills quarterback Jim Kelly.

In October 2024, Bergey was among 60 former players under consideration for the 2025 Pro Football Hall of Fame class in the Senior category, though he did not make it to the next round of 31 candidates.

Bergey died from cancer in Chadds Ford on December 25, 2024. He was 79.
