= 1974 All-Pro Team =

Official list of the best NFL players in 1974

The following is a list of players that were named to the Associated Press All-Pro Team, the Newspaper Enterprise Association All-Pro team and the Pro Football Writers Association, and Pro Football Weekly All-Pro teams in 1974. Both first- and second- teams are listed for the AP, NEA, and PFWA teams. These are the four All-Pro teams that are included in the Total Football II: The Official Encyclopedia of the National Football League and compose the Consensus All-pro team for 1974.

== Teams ==
Offense
Position	First team	Second team
Quarterback	Ken Stabler, Oakland Raiders (AP, NEA, PFWA, PFW)	Jim Hart, St. Louis Cardinals (AP-2, NEA-2); Ken Anderson, Cincinnati Bengals (PFWA-2)
Running back	O. J. Simpson, Buffalo Bills (AP, NEA, PFWA, PFW); Otis Armstrong, Denver Broncos (AP, PFWA, PFW); Lawrence McCutcheon, Los Angeles Rams (NEA)	Chuck Foreman, Minnesota Vikings (AP-2, NEA-2, PFWA-2); Otis Armstrong, Denver Broncos (NEA-2); Lawrence McCutcheon, Los Angeles Rams (AP-2, PFWA-2)
Wide receiver	Cliff Branch, Oakland Raiders (AP, NEA, PFWA, PFW); Drew Pearson, Dallas Cowboys (AP, PFWA, PFW); Mel Gray, St. Louis Cardinals (NEA)	Isaac Curtis, Cincinnati Bengals (AP-2, NEA-2, PFWA-2); Charley Taylor, Washington Redskins (AP-2); Fred Biletnikoff, Oakland Raiders (PFWA-2); Drew Pearson, Dallas Cowboys (NEA-2)
Tight end	Riley Odoms, Denver Broncos (AP, NEA, PFWA, PFW)	Charle Young, Philadelphia Eagles (AP-2, NEA-2, PFWA-2)
Tackle	Ron Yary, Minnesota Vikings (AP, NEA, PFWA, PFW); Art Shell, Oakland Raiders (AP, NEA, PFWA, PFW)	Dan Dierdorf, St. Louis Cardinals (AP-2, NEA-2, PFWA-2); Rayfield Wright, Dallas Cowboys (AP-2, PFWA-2); Russ Washington, San Diego Chargers (NEA-2)
Guard	Larry Little, Miami Dolphins (AP, PFWA); Gene Upshaw, Oakland Raiders (AP, PFW); Tom Mack, Los Angeles Rams (PFWA, PFW); Ed White, Minnesota Vikings (NEA); Gale Gillingham, Green Bay Packers (NEA)	Reggie McKenzie, Buffalo Bills (AP-2, PFWA-2); Joe DeLamielleure, Buffalo Bills (NEA-2); Gene Upshaw, Oakland Raiders (NEA-2, PFWA-2); Tom Mack, Los Angeles Rams (AP-2)
Center	Jim Langer, Miami Dolphins (AP, NEA, PFWA, PFW)	Len Hauss, Washington Redskins (AP-2); Jack Rudnay, Kansas City Chiefs (NEA-2); Bobby Maples, Denver Broncos (PFWA-2)

Special teams
Position	First team	Second team
Kicker	Chester Marcol, Green Bay Packers (AP, PFWA, PFW); Jan Stenerud, Kansas City Chiefs (NEA)	Roy Gerela, Pittsburgh Steelers (AP-2, NEA-2, PFWA-2)
Punter	Ray Guy, Oakland Raiders (NEA, PFWA, PFW)	Jerrel Wilson, Kansas City Chiefs (NEA-2); Billy Van Heusen, Denver Broncos (PFWA-2)

Defense
Position	First team	Second team
Defensive end	L. C. Greenwood, Pittsburgh Steelers (AP, PFWA, PFW); Jack Youngblood, Los Angeles Rams (AP, PFWA); Claude Humphrey, Atlanta Falcons (NEA, PFW); Fred Dryer, Los Angeles Rams (NEA)	Bill Stanfill, Miami Dolphins (NEA-2, PFWA-2); L. C. Greenwood, Pittsburgh Steelers (NEA-2); Claude Humphrey, Atlanta Falcons (AP-2, PFWA-2); Fred Dryer, Los Angeles Rams (AP-2)
Defensive tackle	Joe Greene, Pittsburgh Steelers (AP, NEA, PFWA, PFW); Alan Page, Minnesota Vikings (AP, NEA, PFWA, PFW)	Merlin Olsen, Los Angeles Rams (PFWA-2); Wally Chambers, Chicago Bears (AP-2); Larry Brooks, Los Angeles Rams (NEA-2); Ernie Holmes, Pittsburgh Steelers (NEA-2); Otis Sistrunk, Oakland Raiders (AP-2); John Mendenhall, New York Giants (PFWA-2)
Middle linebacker	Bill Bergey, Philadelphia Eagles (AP, PFWA, PFW); Willie Lanier, Kansas City Chiefs (NEA)	Bill Bergey, Philadelphia Eagles (NEA-2); Willie Lanier, Kansas City Chiefs (AP-2, PFWA-2)
Outside linebacker	Jack Ham, Pittsburgh Steelers (AP, NEA, PFWA, PFW); Ted Hendricks, Green Bay Packers (AP, NEA, PFWA, PFW)	Isiah Robertson, Los Angeles Rams (AP-2, NEA-2, PFWA-2); Chris Hanburger, Washington Redskins (AP-2, NEA-2 PFWA-2)
Cornerback	Robert James, Buffalo Bills (AP, NEA, PFWA, PFW); Emmitt Thomas, Kansas City Chiefs (AP, PFWA); Roger Wehrli, St. Louis Cardinals (NEA, PFW)	Lemar Parrish, Cincinnati Bengals (NEA-2, PFWA-2); Mike Bass, Washington Redskins (AP-2); Emmitt Thomas, Kansas City Chiefs (NEA-2); Roger Wehrli, St. Louis Cardinals (AP-2, PFWA-2)
Safety	Tony Greene, Buffalo Bills (AP, NEA, PFWA, PFW); Jake Scott, Miami Dolphins (AP, PFW); Dick Anderson, Miami Dolphins (NEA); Ken Houston, Washington Redskins (PFWA)	Jack Tatum, Oakland Raiders (AP-2, PFWA-2); Cliff Harris, Dallas Cowboys (NEA-2); Dick Anderson, Miami Dolphins (AP-2, PFWA-2); Ken Houston, Washington Redskins (NEA-2)

== Key ==
AP = Associated Press All-Pro team; AP-2 Associated Press Second-team All-Pro; PFWA = Pro Football Writers Association All-Pro team; NEA = Newspaper Enterprise Association All-Pro team.; NEA-2 Newspaper Enterprise Association Second-team All-Pro; PFW = Pro Football Weekly All-Pro team; t = players tied in votes.
