= 1977 All-Pro Team =

Official list of the best NFL players in 1977

The 1977 All-Pro Team is composed of the National Football League players that were named to the Associated Press, Newspaper Enterprise Association, Pro Football Writers Association, and Pro Football Weekly All-Pro Teams in 1977. Both first- and second- teams are listed for the AP and NEA teams. These are the four All-Pro teams that are included in the Total Football II: The Official Encyclopedia of the National Football League and compose the Consensus All-pro team for 1977.

== Teams ==
Offense
Position	First team	Second team
Quarterback	Bob Griese, Miami Dolphins (AP, NEA, PFWA, PFW)	Bert Jones, Baltimore Colts (AP-2, NEA-2)
Running back	Franco Harris, Pittsburgh Steelers (AP, NEA, PFWA, PFW); Walter Payton, Chicago Bears (AP, NEA, PFWA, PFW)	Mark van Eeghen, Oakland Raiders (AP-2); Chuck Foreman, Minnesota Vikings (NEA-2); Lydell Mitchell, Baltimore Colts (AP-2); Greg Pruitt, Cleveland Browns (NEA-2)
Wide receiver	Nat Moore, Miami Dolphins (AP, PFWA); Drew Pearson, Dallas Cowboys (AP, NEA, PFWA, PFW); Lynn Swann, Pittsburgh Steelers (PFW); Cliff Branch, Oakland Raiders (NEA)	Lynn Swann, Pittsburgh Steelers (AP-2); Harold Jackson, Los Angeles Rams (NEA-2); Ken Burrough, Houston Oilers (AP-2, NEA-2)
Tight end	Dave Casper, Oakland Raiders (AP, NEA, PFWA, PFW)	Russ Francis, New England Patriots (NEA-2); Riley Odoms, Denver Broncos (AP-2)
Tackle	Art Shell, Oakland Raiders (AP, NEA, PFWA, PFW); Dan Dierdorf, St. Louis Cardinals (AP, NEA, PFWA, PFW)	Ron Yary, Minnesota Vikings (AP-2, NEA-2); George Kunz, Baltimore Colts (AP-2, NEA-2)
Guard	Joe DeLamielleure, Buffalo Bills (AP, NEA, PFWA, PFW); Gene Upshaw, Oakland Raiders (AP, PFWA-t, PFW); Larry Little, Miami Dolphins (PFWA-t); John Hannah, New England Patriots (NEA)	Bob Kuechenberg, Miami Dolphins (NEA-2); Gene Upshaw, Oakland Raiders (NEA-2); Larry Little, Miami Dolphins (AP-2); John Hannah, New England Patriots (AP-2)
Center	Jim Langer, Miami Dolphins (AP, NEA, PFWA, PFW)	Tom Banks, St. Louis Cardinals (AP-2, NEA-2)

Special teams
Position	First team	Second team
Kicker	Efrén Herrera, Dallas Cowboys (AP, NEA, PFWA, PFW)	Errol Mann, Oakland Raiders (AP-2, NEA-2)
Punter	Ray Guy, Oakland Raiders (AP, NEA, PFWA, PFW)	John James, Atlanta Falcons (AP-2, NEA-2)
Kick Returner	Billy "White Shoes" Johnson, Houston Oilers (AP, PFWA); Raymond Clayborn, New England Patriots (PFW)	Rick Upchurch, Denver Broncos (AP-2)
Punt Returner	Billy "White Shoes" Johnson, Houston Oilers (PFW)	

Defense
Position	First team	Second team
Defensive end	Lyle Alzado, Denver Broncos (AP, PFWA, PFW); Harvey Martin, Dallas Cowboys (AP, NEA, PFWA, PFW); Claude Humphrey, Atlanta Falcons (NEA)	Claude Humphrey, Atlanta Falcons (AP-2); Lyle Alzado, Denver Broncos (NEA-2); Jack Youngblood, Los Angeles Rams (AP-2, NEA-2)
Defensive tackle	Joe Greene, Pittsburgh Steelers (AP); Cleveland Elam, San Francisco 49ers (AP, NEA, PFWA, PFW); Larry Brooks, Los Angeles Rams (PFWA); Louie Kelcher, San Diego Chargers (NEA); Randy White, Dallas Cowboys (PFW)	Rubin Carter, Denver Broncos (AP-2); Curley Culp, Houston Oilers (NEA-2); Larry Brooks, Los Angeles Rams (NEA-2); Louie Kelcher, San Diego Chargers (AP-2)
Middle linebacker	Bill Bergey, Philadelphia Eagles (NEA, PFWA); Randy Gradishar, Denver Broncos (AP, PFW)	Bill Bergey, Philadelphia Eagles (AP-2); Randy Gradishar, Denver Broncos (NEA-2)
Outside linebacker	Tom Jackson, Denver Broncos (AP, PFWA, PFW); Jack Ham, Pittsburgh Steelers (AP, NEA, PFWA, PFW); Robert Brazile, Houston Oilers (NEA)	Robert Brazile, Houston Oilers (AP-2); Ted Hendricks, Oakland Raiders (NEA-2); Isiah Robertson, Los Angeles Rams (AP-2, NEA-2)
Cornerback	Rolland Lawrence, Atlanta Falcons (AP, PFWA, PFW); Roger Wehrli, St. Louis Cardinals (AP, NEA); Monte Jackson, Los Angeles Rams (PFWA); Mike Haynes, New England Patriots (PFW); Mel Blount, Pittsburgh Steelers (NEA)	Louis Wright, Denver Broncos (NEA-2); Rolland Lawrence, Atlanta Falcons (NEA-2); Mike Haynes, New England Patriots (AP-2); Monte Jackson, Los Angeles Rams (AP-2)
Safety	Cliff Harris, Dallas Cowboys (AP, NEA, PFWA, PFW); Ken Houston, Washington Redskins (NEA, PFW); Charlie Waters, Dallas Cowboys (PFWA); Billy Thompson, Denver Broncos (AP)	Charlie Waters, Dallas Cowboys (AP-2, NEA-2); Jack Tatum, Oakland Raiders (NEA-2); Lyle Blackwood, Baltimore Colts (AP-2)

== Key ==
- AP = Associated Press first-team All-Pro
- AP-2 = Associated Press second-team All-Pro
- NEA = Newspaper Enterprise Association first-team All-Pro team
- NEA-2 = Newspaper Enterprise Association second-team All-Pro team
- PFW = Pro Football Weekly All-Pro team
- PFWA = Pro Football Writers Association All-NFL
