= Isiah Robertson =

American football player (1949–2018)

- Robertson as he appeared on his 1972 Topps football card

No. 58
- Position: Linebacker

Personal information
- Born: August 17, 1949; New Orleans, Louisiana, U.S.
- Died: December 6, 2018 (aged 69); Mabank, Texas, U.S.
- Listed height: 6 ft 3 in (1.91 m)
- Listed weight: 225 lb (102 kg)

Career information
- High school: Covington (LA) Pine View
- College: Southern
- NFL draft: 1971: 1st round, 10th overall pick

Career history
- Los Angeles Rams (1971–1978); Buffalo Bills (1979–1982)

Awards and highlights
- NFL Defensive Rookie of the Year (1971); 4× First-team All-Pro (1973–1976); 2× Second-team All-Pro (1971, 1977); 6× Pro Bowl (1971, 1973–1977)

Career NFL statistics
- Interceptions: 25
- Touchdowns: 3
- Stats at Pro Football Reference

Isiah "Butch" Robertson (August 17, 1949 – December 6, 2018) was an American professional football player who was a linebacker for the Los Angeles Rams (1971–1978) and the Buffalo Bills (1979–1982). He was selected to six Pro Bowls during his years with the Rams. He had 25 career interceptions, returning three for touchdowns, scoring a fourth touchdown on a fumble recovery in 1978. According to Rams and Bills records, Robertson also sacked the quarterback 24 1/2 times and forced 16 fumbles in his career.

Robertson combined size, strength, quickness, speed, toughness, and a knack for making the game-breaking play. The 6'3" star was one of the NFL's fastest linebackers of his era, having been timed at 4.6 seconds in the 40-yard dash.

== College career ==
Isiah Robertson was a middle-linebacker at Southern University, located in Baton Rouge, Louisiana, where he anchored a defense alongside future National Football League great and Hall of Fame member, cornerback Mel Blount.

In 1970, his senior year at Southern, Robertson made 112 tackles and had 45 assists. The season was highlighted by a record-setting 102 yard interception return for a game-winning touchdown against Grambling State University in the game's waning seconds and a 15 tackle game against Prairie View in which he preserved a tie with a blocked extra point attempt.

Robertson was a star of the Senior Bowl which followed the 1970 season, intercepting a pass and returning it 90 yards for the South before being run down from behind by the speedy Northern wide out J. D. Hill. He was chosen to The Sporting News and TIME 1970 All-American team, as well as being named to the AP and UPI small college All-American Teams.

Robertson concluded his collegiate career by receiving a Bachelor of Science degree in business marketing.

== NFL career ==
=== 1971 draft ===
Robertson was a first-round draft choice of the Los Angeles Rams in 1971, the 10th player chosen overall. Robertson was the first linebacker and second defensive player taken in the '71 draft, a lottery which featured the selection of quarterbacks Jim Plunkett, Archie Manning, and Dan Pastorini with the first three picks.

The Rams had earlier acquired the draft pick used to select Robertson, touted as "the black Dick Butkus," as part of a multi-player deal made with the Washington Redskins. The team later used its own first round pick to select University of Florida defensive lineman Jack Youngblood, a player eventually elected to the Pro Football Hall of Fame.

=== Los Angeles Rams ===
Robertson got off to a lackluster start in his debut season, 1971, earning reproach in the press from Rams linebackers' coach Tom Caitlin for having "wasted six weeks of his summer" — three weeks in college all-star camp and three weeks with the Rams putting out only partial effort. He subsequently took heed and increased his intensity, winning accolades from star teammate Deacon Jones, who called the rookie "the best No. 1 choice I've seen since I've been with the Rams."

Robertson explained his slow start:

"I was given some wrong information. Someone told me that pro football would be a lot of fun. But pro football is a business, not a game. I wasn't putting out 110% and now I'm making the adjustment.... It requires so much more dedication, hard work, and study. In college, you go to class and then practice. Here, it's just practice — it's football all the time."

In his rookie year, Robertson established himself as one of the NFL's new stars, replacing the departed Jack Pardee as the Rams' starting strongside linebacker. He was voted AP Defensive Rookie of the Year, and finished third in overall Rookie of the Year voting, with Packer running back John Brockington winning the award. Robertson was also selected Second-team All-NFL and chosen to the Pro Bowl, played at the Los Angeles Memorial Coliseum. The Rams posted an 8-5-1 record but missed the playoffs by half a game.

In 1973 Robertson was voted First-team All-Pro. It was one of the best seasons of his brilliant career. He intercepted 3 passes that season and returned one interception 49 yards for a touchdown against the New York Giants on Monday Night Football. It was the first touchdown of his professional career. Isiah Robertson was considered by many as the best linebacker in the NFL. The Rams finished with a great 12–2 record and won the Western division.

In 1974, Robertson had an excellent season making All-Pro once again and named to his third Pro Bowl. The Rams posted a 10–4 record and won the Western division title again. In the playoffs, the Rams played the Washington Redskins. In the 4th quarter, with the Rams leading the Redskins only 13–10, Isiah intercepted quarterback Sonny Jurgensen's pass and ran 59 yards for a touchdown that sealed a 19–10 victory for the Rams.

In 1975 was voted All-Pro and made the Pro Bowl for the fourth time. He intercepted 4 passes for 118 yards and 1 touchdown. On Monday Night Football, against the Philadelphia Eagles, Robertson intercepted a pass and ran 76 yards for a touchdown showcasing his great speed. The Rams beat the Eagles 42–3. In 1975 the Rams finished with a 12–2 record and won their division. In the playoffs, the Rams defeated the explosive St. Louis Cardinals 35–23. The Los Angeles Rams would face the Dallas Cowboys in the 1975 NFC Championship game.

Butch Robertson was a First-team All-Pro in 1976 and a Second-team choice in 1977, making the Pro Bowl both seasons.

In 1978, his last year with the Rams, he was credited with 40 tackles, 4 sacks, and 2 fumble recoveries. Robertson returned a fumble 16 yards for a touchdown against the Minnesota Vikings in a Rams 34- 17 victory. He only started 6 of the 13 games he played in, losing his starting job to Bob Brudzinski. Robertson may be best known for a play in the 1978 season, when, while attempting to tackle then-rookie Houston Oilers running back (and NFL Hall Of Famer) Earl Campbell, Robertson was head-butted in the sternum and run over by Campbell on his way down the field against the Rams. The play is often shown as a part of NFL Films highlights; especially those concerning Campbell.

=== Buffalo Bills ===
After the season, the Rams traded Robertson to the Buffalo Bills. After he was traded Robertson signed a 4-year $920,000 contract making him among the highest paid NFL linebackers, averaging $230,000 a season. In 1979, in his first year as a member of the Bills, Isiah brought his 8 years experience and football savvy to the young Bills linebacking corps, which included standout rookie Jim Haslett. He had another outstanding year. Isiah registered 93 tackles, a quarterback sack, recovered 2 fumbles, and had 2 interceptions. In a game against the Cincinnati Bengals, he intercepted a pass and ran 23 yards for a touchdown. It was the last touchdown of his career.

In 1980, Robertson had 76 tackles as part of an 11–5-record season for the Bills, in which won the Eastern division. The team then lost 20–14 in the playoffs to the San Diego Chargers.

In 1981, Robertson had 48 tackles and 23 assists for a total of 71 tackles. The Buffalo Bills posted a 10–6 record and were a wild card team in the playoffs. They defeated the New York Jets 31–27 in the playoffs and then lost to the Cincinnati Bengals in another playoff game. Robertson would play one more year, 1982, and he started all nine games as recorded 34 tackles.

Robertson retired from the NFL on May 2, 1983.

== Death and legacy ==
Robertson died in a three car crash in Van Zandt County, southeast of Dallas, Texas on December 6, 2018, when he lost control of a limousine he was driving and spun out while navigating a curve. Robertson's limo, which came to a rest perpendicular to the road along which he had been traveling, was then t-boned by a car from behind, pushing him into the opposite lane of traffic, where he was hit by a car traveling in the other direction. Robertson was transported to a nearby hospital, where he subsequently died.

Isiah Robertson was 69 years old at the time of his death. A lawsuit filed by his family stated that Robertson had advanced (Stage 3) chronic traumatic encephalopathy (CTE), a degenerative brain disease caused by repeated hits to the head. He is one of at least 345 NFL players to be diagnosed after death with this disease.

The Professional Football Researchers Association named Robertson to the PFRA Hall of Very Good Class of 2016. He was voted to the Pro Bowl in 1971 and then in every year from 1973 to 1977, cementing his place as one of the NFL's premiere linebackers of the 1970s.

Isaiah ran a drug rehab facility and was deeply involved in its operation.
