= Bruce Bergey =

American football player (1946–2026)

No. 84, 83
- Position: Defensive end

Personal information
- Born: August 8, 1946; South Dayton, New York, U.S.
- Died: September 20, 2026 (aged 80); Hillsboro, Oregon, U.S.
- Listed height: 6 ft 2 in (1.88 m)
- Listed weight: 240 lb (109 kg)

Career information
- High school: Pine Valley (South Dayton)
- College: UCLA
- NFL draft: 1971: 14th round, 354th overall pick

Career history
- Kansas City Chiefs (1971); Houston Oilers (1971); Toronto Argonauts (1972–1973); Portland Storm (1974); Portland Thunder (1975)
- Stats at Pro Football Reference

Bruce Gene Bergey (August 8, 1946 – September 20, 2026) was an American professional football player who was a defensive end in the National Football League (NFL), World Football League (WFL) and Canadian Football League (CFL). He played college football for the UCLA Bruins. Bergey played in the NFL for the Kansas City Chiefs and Houston Oilers in 1971 and in the CFL for the Toronto Argonauts from 1972 to 1973. Bergey died at a medical center in Hillsboro, Oregon, on September 20, 2026, at the age of 80.

Bergey's older brother, Bill, was an All-Pro linebacker for 12 seasons in the NFL and AFL.
