= 1976 All-Pro Team =

Official list of the best NFL players in 1976

The 1976 All-Pro Team is composed of the National Football League players that were named to the Associated Press, Newspaper Enterprise Association, Pro Football Writers Association, and Pro Football Weekly All-Pro Teams in 1976. Both first- and second- teams are listed for the AP, NEA, and PFWA teams. These are the four All-Pro teams that are included in the Total Football II: The Official Encyclopedia of the National Football League and compose the Consensus All-pro team for 1976.

== Teams ==
Offense
Position	First team	Second team
Quarterback	Bert Jones, Baltimore Colts (AP, NEA, PFWA); Ken Stabler, Oakland Raiders (PFW)	Ken Stabler, Oakland Raiders (AP-2, NEA-2, PFWA-2)
Running back	Walter Payton, Chicago Bears (AP, PFWA, PFW); O. J. Simpson, Buffalo Bills (AP, NEA, PFWA, PFW); Chuck Foreman, Minnesota Vikings (NEA)	Franco Harris, Pittsburgh Steelers (NEA-2, PFWA-2); Lydell Mitchell, Baltimore Colts (AP-2); Walter Payton, Chicago Bears (NEA-2); Chuck Foreman, Minnesota Vikings (AP-2, PFWA-2)
Wide receiver	Drew Pearson, Dallas Cowboys (AP, PFWA, PFW); Cliff Branch, Oakland Raiders (AP, NEA, PFWA, PFW); Isaac Curtis, Cincinnati Bengals (NEA)	Isaac Curtis, Cincinnati Bengals (AP-2, PFWA-2); Charlie Joiner, San Diego Chargers (NEA-2); Roger Carr, Baltimore Colts (AP-2, NEA-2, PFWA-2)
Tight end	Dave Casper, Oakland Raiders (AP, NEA, PFWA, PFW)	Russ Francis, New England Patriots (AP-2, NEA-2, PFWA-2)
Tackle	Dan Dierdorf, St. Louis Cardinals (AP, NEA, PFWA, PFW); Ron Yary, Minnesota Vikings (AP, NEA, PFWA); Art Shell, Oakland Raiders (PFW)	George Kunz, Baltimore Colts (AP-2, NEA-2, PFWA-2); Rayfield Wright, Dallas Cowboys (AP-2, NEA-2, PFWA-2)
Guard	John Hannah, New England Patriots (AP, PFWA, PFW); Joe DeLamielleure, Buffalo Bills (AP, NEA, PFWA, PFW); Conrad Dobler, St. Louis Cardinals (NEA)	Conrad Dobler, St. Louis Cardinals (AP-2); Ed White, Minnesota Vikings (PFWA-2); John Hannah, New England Patriots (NEA-2); Gene Upshaw, Oakland Raiders (AP-2, NEA-2, PFWA-2)
Center	Jim Langer, Miami Dolphins (NEA, PFWA, PFW); Tom Banks, St. Louis Cardinals (AP)	Jim Langer, Miami Dolphins (AP-2); Tom Banks, St. Louis Cardinals (NEA-2, PFWA-2)

Special teams
Position	First team	Second team
Kicker	Jim Bakken, St. Louis Cardinals (AP, NEA, PFWA, PFW)	Efrén Herrera, Dallas Cowboys (AP-2, PFWA-2); Jan Stenerud, Kansas City Chiefs (NEA-2)
Punter	Ray Guy, Oakland Raiders (AP, NEA, PFWA, PFW)	John James, Atlanta Falcons (AP-2, NEA-2, PFWA-2)
Kick Returner	Rick Upchurch, Denver Broncos (AP); Duriel Harris, Miami Dolphins (PFW)	Eddie Brown, Washington Redskins (AP-2)
Punt Returner	Rick Upchurch, Denver Broncos (PFW)	

Defense
Position	First team	Second team
Defensive end	John Dutton, Baltimore Colts (AP); Tommy Hart, San Francisco 49ers (NEA, PFWA, PFW); Jack Youngblood, Los Angeles Rams (AP, NEA, PFWA, PFW)	Coy Bacon, Cincinnati Bengals (NEA-2, PFWA-2); Harvey Martin, Dallas Cowboys (AP-2, NEA-2); Tommy Hart, San Francisco 49ers (AP-2); John Dutton, Baltimore Colts (PFWA-2)
Defensive tackle	Jerry Sherk, Cleveland Browns (AP, NEA, PFWA, PFW); Wally Chambers, Chicago Bears (AP, NEA, PFWA, PFW)	Joe Greene, Pittsburgh Steelers (AP-2); Alan Page, Minnesota Vikings (AP-2, NEA-2, PFWA-2); Cleveland Elam, San Francisco 49ers (NEA-2); Joe Ehrmann, Baltimore Colts (PFWA-2)
Middle linebacker	Jack Lambert, Pittsburgh Steelers (AP, NEA, PFWA, PFW)	Bill Bergey, Philadelphia Eagles (AP-2, NEA-2, PFWA-2)
Outside linebacker	Isiah Robertson, Los Angeles Rams (AP); Chris Hanburger, Washington Redskins (NEA, PFW); Jack Ham, Pittsburgh Steelers (AP, NEA, PFWA, PFW); Robert Brazile, Houston Oilers (PFWA)	Ted Hendricks, Oakland Raiders (AP-2, NEA-2, PFWA-2); Phil Villapiano, Oakland Raiders (NEA-2); Isiah Robertson, Los Angeles Rams (PFWA-2); Robert Brazile, Houston Oilers (AP-2)
Cornerback	Monte Jackson, Los Angeles Rams (AP, NEA, PFWA, PFW); Roger Wehrli, St. Louis Cardinals (AP, PFWA); Lemar Parrish, Cincinnati Bengals (NEA); Mel Blount, Pittsburgh Steelers (PFW)	Mike Haynes, New England Patriots (AP-2, NEA-2, PFWA-2); Ken Riley, Cincinnati Bengals (AP-2, PFWA-2); Mel Blount, Pittsburgh Steelers (NEA-2)
Safety	Cliff Harris, Dallas Cowboys (AP, NEA, PFWA, PFW); Ken Houston, Washington Redskins (NEA, PFWA, PFW); Tommy Casanova, Cincinnati Bengals (AP)	Glen Edwards, Pittsburgh Steelers (AP-2, NEA-2); Mike Wagner, Pittsburgh Steelers (AP-2); Thom Darden, Cleveland Browns (PFWA-2); Tommy Casanova, Cincinnati Bengals (NEA-2, PFWA-2)

== Key ==
- AP = Associated Press first-team All-Pro
- AP-2 = Associated Press second-team All-Pro
- NEA = Newspaper Enterprise Association first-team All-Pro team
- NEA-2 = Newspaper Enterprise Association second-team All-Pro team
- PFW = Pro Football Weekly All-Pro team
- PFWA = Pro Football Writers Association All-NFL
