= Dick Anderson =

American football player (born 1946)

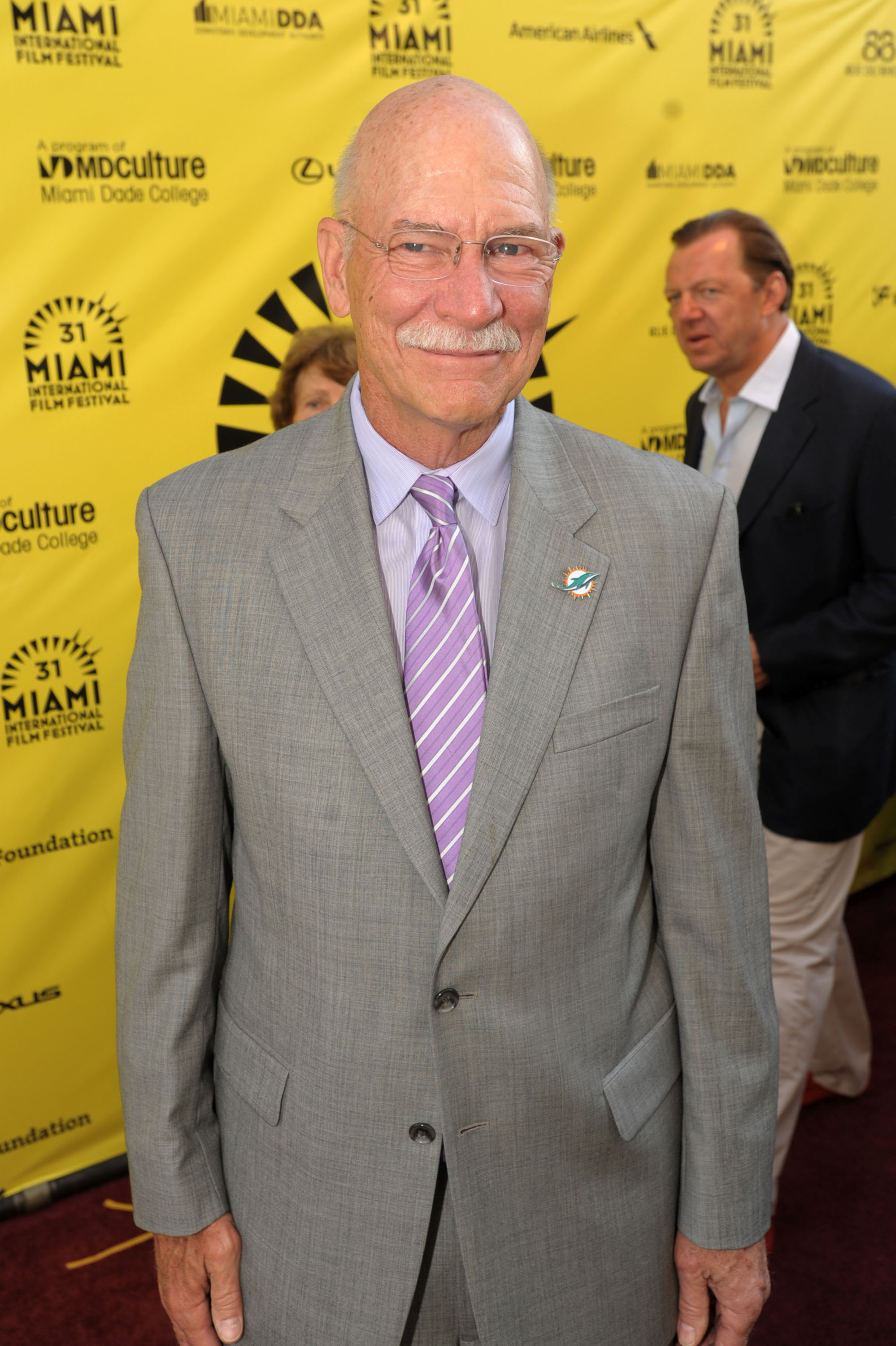
- Anderson in 2014

No. 40
- Position: Safety

Personal information
- Born: February 10, 1946 (age 80); Midland, Michigan, U.S.
- Listed height: 6 ft 2 in (1.88 m)
- Listed weight: 196 lb (89 kg)

Career information
- High school: Boulder (Boulder, Colorado)
- College: Colorado (1965–1967)
- NFL draft: 1968: 3rd round, 73rd overall pick

Career history
- Miami Dolphins (1968–1977)

Awards and highlights
- 2× Super Bowl champion (VII, VIII); NFL Defensive Player of the Year (1973); AFL co-Defensive Rookie of the Year (1968); 2× First-team All-Pro (1972, 1973); Second-team All-Pro (1974); 3× Pro Bowl (1972–1974); NFL interceptions co-leader (1973); NFL 1970s All-Decade Team; Miami Dolphins Honor Roll; Dolphins Walk of Fame (2018); Consensus All-American (1967); First-team All-Big Eight (1967); NFL record: Most passes intercepted in a single game: 4 (tied)

Career NFL statistics
- Interceptions: 34
- Interception return yards: 792
- Touchdowns: 4
- Stats at Pro Football Reference
- College Football Hall of Fame

Richard Paul Anderson (born February 10, 1946) is an American former professional football player who was a safety for the Miami Dolphins of the American Football League (AFL) and National Football League (NFL) for nine seasons during the 1960s and 1970s. He played college football for the Colorado Buffaloes and was recognized as a consensus All-American. He was selected in third round of the 1968 NFL/AFL draft, and he played for his entire professional career for the Dolphins.

Anderson made an immediate impact with the Dolphins during his rookie year of 1968 with 8 interceptions (his first of three seasons where he recorded at least 8 interceptions), which resulted in him winning the AP AFL Defensive Rookie of the Year Award along with George Atkinson. In 1970, with the addition of drafting safety Jake Scott, the two would make up one of the most dynamic safety tandems in the NFL throughout the 1970s, on the Miami Dolphins famed "No-Name Defense". He won back-to-back Super Bowl championships in 1972 during Miami's "perfect season", and the following year in 1973. During their 1973 Super Bowl championship run, Anderson was voted the NFL Defensive Player of the Year where he recorded another 8 interceptions, including a record 4 in one game against the Pittsburgh Steelers.

Anderson finished his career as Miami's 2nd all-time leading interceptor with 34 career interceptions (one behind Jake Scott's 35). He was a three-time Pro Bowl selection, a three-time first (2) or second (1) team All-Pro, and was also selected to the NFL 1970s All-Decade Team.

In 1993, Anderson was inducted into the College Football Hall of Fame. Despite numerous NFL accolades, Anderson has yet to make the Pro Football Hall of Fame. It's possibly due to his short tenure, only playing 10 seasons.

== Early life ==
Anderson was born on February 10, 1946, in Midland, Michigan. He attended Boulder High School in Boulder, Colorado.

== College career ==
Anderson was named a consensus first-team All-American in his senior season at the University of Colorado, and set a school record with 14 career interceptions.

== Professional career ==
=== Miami Dolphins ===
Anderson was selected in the third round by the Dolphins in the 1968 NFL/AFL Draft. He was named the AFL defensive rookie of the year. He was a three-time Pro Bowler in 1972, 1973 (in which he was NFL Defensive Player of the Year), and 1974, in which he was one of the leaders of the Dolphins well known No Name Defense. Anderson was also the president of the National Football League Players Association from 1975 until he retired.

Although primarily a safety, he also served as the team's backup punter. In 1969 Miami's regular punter separated his shoulder late in the season and Anderson took over the punting duties for the Dolphins' last game of the season against the New York Jets. In Miami's undefeated season of 1972, Seiple injured his knee in a late season game against the Jets and Anderson had to punt late in that game. The Dolphins signed punter Billy Lothridge, who punted the next two games, but the Dolphins had to deactivate Lothridge for their next to last game against the New York Giants in order to activate quarterback Bob Griese, who had missed much of the season with an injury, and so Anderson had to take over the punting duties for that game. Seiple returned for the Dolphins' last game of the season and for the playoffs.

In his nine AFL/NFL seasons, Anderson recorded 34 interceptions, which he returned for 792 yards and 3 touchdowns. He also recovered 15 fumbles, returning them for 100 yards and a touchdown. On special teams, he gained 430 yards returning kickoffs and punted the ball nine times for 335 yards.

After retirement, Anderson became a successful businessman and a Florida state senator. In 1993, he was enshrined in the College Football Hall of Fame. His brother is Bobby Anderson, an All-American running back at Colorado and the eleventh overall pick of the 1970 NFL draft, selected by the Denver Broncos. His son, Blake Anderson, played wide receiver for the University of Colorado.

On December 3, 1973, Anderson had perhaps his greatest personal effort in his career, becoming the 7th player to intercept 4 passes in a single game in NFL history in the Dolphins 30–26 victory over the Pittsburgh Steelers. Since that date, another six players have tied that mark.

On December 3, 2006, Anderson was inducted into the Miami Dolphins Honor Roll during halftime of the Dolphins-Jaguars game. He is one of two players inducted that year, the other being Richmond Webb, who was inducted December 25 against the Jets. Anderson was the first individual defensive back inducted into the Honor Roll. The entire 1972 Dolphins roster is a part of the Honor Roll, including Anderson.

In 2018, the Professional Football Researchers Association named Anderson to the PFRA Hall of Very Good Class of 2018. He is noted for being one of four players from the NFL All-Decade team from the 1970s to not eventually have been inducted into the Pro Football Hall of Fame.

== NFL career statistics ==
Legend
	Led the league
	NFL Defensive Player of the Year
	Won the Super Bowl
**Bold**	Career high

=== Regular season ===
Year	Team	Games		Interceptions				Fum			
Year	Team	GP	GS	Int	Yards	TD	Lng	Fmb	FR	Yards	TD
1968	MIA	**14**	12	**8**	**230**	1	**96**	**1**	1	13	0
1969	MIA	**14**	**14**	3	106	0	40	**1**	3	0	0
1970	MIA	**14**	**14**	**8**	191	0	86	**1**	2	0	0
1971	MIA	**14**	**14**	2	33	0	33	**1**	4	16	0
1972	MIA	**14**	**14**	3	34	0	22	**1**	**5**	35	**1**
1973	MIA	**14**	**14**	**8**	163	**2**	36	0	0	0	0
1974	MIA	**14**	**14**	1	3	0	3	0	1	**36**	0
1975	MIA	0	0	Did not play due to injury - (Knee)							
1976	MIA	9	0	1	32	0	32	0	0	0	0
1977	MIA	**14**	4	0	0	0	0	0	0	0	0
Career		121	100	34	792	3	96	5	16	100	1

== Personal life ==
Anderson has competed at the American Century Championship, an annual golf competition to determine the best players among American sports and entertainment celebrities. He won the tournament in 1994 and has a total of 11 top ten finishes. The tournament, televised by NBC in July, is played at Edgewood Tahoe Golf Course in Lake Tahoe, Nevada.

== See also ==
- List of American Football League players
