= Rayfield Wright =

American football player (1945–2022)

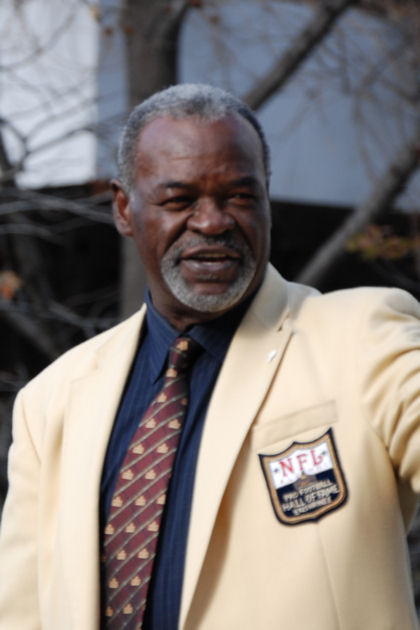
- Wright wearing a Hall of Fame jacket in 2006

No. 85, 67, 70
- Position: Offensive tackle

Personal information
- Born: August 23, 1945; Griffin, Georgia, U.S.
- Died: April 7, 2022 (aged 76); Willow Park, Texas, U.S.
- Listed height: 6 ft 6 in (1.98 m)
- Listed weight: 255 lb (116 kg)

Career information
- High school: Fairmont (Griffin)
- College: Fort Valley State (1963–1966)
- NFL draft: 1967: 7th round, 182nd overall pick

Career history
- Dallas Cowboys (1967–1979); Philadelphia Eagles (1980)*
- * Offseason or practice squad member only

Awards and highlights
- 2× Super Bowl champion (VI, XII); 3× First-team All-Pro (1971–1973); 3× Second-team All-Pro (1974–1976); 6× Pro Bowl (1971–1976); NFL 1970s All-Decade Team; Dallas Cowboys Ring of Honor

Career NFL statistics
- Games played: 166
- Fumble recoveries: 4
- Stats at Pro Football Reference
- Pro Football Hall of Fame

Larry Rayfield Wright (August 23, 1945 – April 7, 2022) was an American professional football player who was an offensive tackle for the Dallas Cowboys of the National Football League (NFL) for 13 seasons. He is a member of the Pro Football Hall of Fame, having been inducted in 2006.

Nicknamed "Big Cat" for his nimble feet, Wright played on five NFC Championship teams that advanced to the Super Bowl (1970, 1971, 1975, 1977, and 1978 seasons), winning twice. He also participated in the Ice Bowl against the Green Bay Packers for the NFL championship in his rookie season in 1967.

== Early life and college ==
Born and raised in Griffin, Georgia, and raised by his mother Opel Wright, he attended Fairmont High School, which was merged with Griffin High School. He was a letterman in basketball, but he was unable to make the high school football team.

Wright went to nearby Fort Valley State College to play college basketball, where he was a standout player. The following summer, head coach Stan Lomax made him quit his summer job at a mill to get ready to join the Wildcats' football team. Lomax tried Wright at free safety, then used him as a punter, defensive end and tight end. The coach also became a father figure to Wright.

Wright was a Boy Scout who, at an early age, memorized Robert Frost's poem The Road Not Taken. In his later years, he credited the poem with helping him navigate the choices he faced in life.

== Professional career ==
Wright was selected by the Dallas Cowboys in the seventh round of the 1967 NFL/AFL draft, 182nd overall, as a tight end. During his first three years with Dallas, the 6 ft 6 in (1.98 m), 225 lb (102 kg) "Big Cat" was a tight end, defensive lineman, and offensive tackle.

In his third season in 1969, Wright got his first chance as a starter after Ralph Neely was sidelined by injury. His opponent in his first start was Los Angeles Rams future Hall of Fame defensive end Deacon Jones, who was in his prime. Wright's performance was so strong that he won a starting role as right tackle before the first day of training camp in 1970.

For thirteen seasons, Wright played more than 200 games, started at right tackle in six NFC Championship games, and played in five Super Bowls, winning two of them: (VI, XII). He earned his first of four All-Pro honors in 1971 and was voted that same year to the first of six straight Pro Bowls.

Wright was named first- or second-team All-Pro each season from 1971 through 1976, earned three All-NFC honors, and the Cowboys led the league for total offense five times (ranked 6th all-time at retirement in 1979). His blocking and leadership as the team's co-captain for seven years helped the Cowboys win 10 division titles and six conference crowns.

Released by the Cowboys in March 1980, Wright signed in April with division rival Philadelphia, but retired early in training camp in July 1980.

He anchored the line for an offense that finished in the top ten in scoring all ten seasons of the 1970s, while helping pave the way for the first five 1,000-yard rushers in Cowboys' history.

Wright played at a time when the right tackle was the most important spot on the offensive line, and was usually paired against the opponent's best pass rusher. He broke every time-honored mold previously held for men of his size. He was light on his feet and possessed an athleticism that had him miscast as a tight end and defensive end for the first three years of his NFL career.

"Rayfield could do it all," said former Cowboys running back Calvin Hill after Wright's election to the Pro Football Hall of Fame. "He could pull. He could run in the open field. He could finesse-block and power-block in the run game. And there was no one better in pass-blocking. He was dominant."

"He was absolutely the best," said Roger Staubach. "Rayfield was a big, strong guy that was able to transfer his size and strength from tight end to tackle. He also had such quick feet that he was able to deal with some of the faster defensive ends and even the linebacker blitzes. If he got beat, I don't remember it."

Was voted the NFLPA NFC Offensive Lineman of the Year in 1972.

Wright was also presented with a number of individual awards following the conclusion of his career, including the NFL All-Super Bowl Team (1990), the Dallas Cowboys 25th Anniversary Team (1985), the Cowboys' own Ring of Honor (2004), the Texas Sports Hall of Fame (2005) and was named to the NFL’s All-Decade Team of the 1970s.

== Legacy ==
Wright was inducted into the Georgia Sports Hall of Fame in 1988. He was a member of the NFL All-Time Super Bowl Team in 1990 and received the NFL Legends Award that same year. He was inducted into the Texas Black Sports Hall of Fame in 2002. In 2004, Rayfield Wright was inducted in the Dallas Cowboys Ring of Honor and the Texas Sports Hall of Fame. In 2006, he was elected to the Pro Football Hall of Fame. He was officially inducted, with introduction by college coach Leon J. "Stan" Lomax, during the Enshrinement Ceremony on August 6, 2006 where his bust, sculpted by Scott Myers, was unveiled.

He was also inducted into the State of Georgia Hall of Fame, the Fort Valley Georgia Hall of Fame and the Griffin Georgia Hall of Fame.

== Personal life ==
In 1992, Wright served as an assistant coach to the Arizona Rattlers of the Arena Football League. Wright's post-football involvement with at-risk, inner city youth resulted in his appointment to the Juvenile Supreme Court in Arizona. He also served as president of the NFL Alumni Chapter, "Caring for Kids" program in the mid-90s. His philanthropic endeavors, including the non-profit "Kids 4 Tomorrow" organization he co-founded with some other NFL players, were featured in Volume 9 of the Philanthropy World Magazine, along with former Cowboy teammate, Cliff Harris.

Wright founded the Rayfield Wright Foundation, which helps children obtain grants to attend college. He authored and published his autobiography Wright Up Front.

In his later years, Wright battled early-onset dementia, the result of numerous head injuries he says he had in 13 seasons, more than 180 regular-season and playoff games from 1967 to 1979. Wright claimed to have suffered several concussions throughout his career, and struggled with memory loss, and claimed to have been in several car accidents caused by seizures. Wright joined other former NFL players in a class-action suit against the NFL accusing the league of hiding evidence of head trauma causing degenerative brain disease; the lawsuit was settled in 2015.

Wright died on April 7, 2022, at the age of 76. At the time of his death, he was survived by his wife Di; his three daughters Courtney Minor, Anitra Hernandez, and Ariel Wright; his sons Laray and Larry Jr; and his brother Lamar.
