= Dwight Stephenson =

American football player (born 1957)

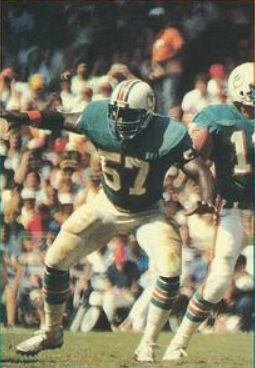
- Stephenson on a 1984 card

No. 57
- Position: Center

Personal information
- Born: November 20, 1957 (age 68); Murfreesboro, North Carolina, U.S.
- Listed height: 6 ft 2 in (1.88 m)
- Listed weight: 255 lb (116 kg)

Career information
- High school: Hampton (Hampton, Virginia)
- College: Alabama
- NFL draft: 1980: 2nd round, 48th overall pick

Career history
- Miami Dolphins (1980–1988)

Awards and highlights
- NFL Man of the Year (1985); 4× First-team All-Pro (1984–1987); Second-team All-Pro (1983); 5× Pro Bowl (1983–1987); NFL 1980s All-Decade Team; NFL 100th Anniversary All-Time Team; Miami Dolphins Honor Roll; Dolphins Walk of Fame (2011); 2× National champion (1978, 1979); 2× Second-team All-American (1978, 1979); Jacobs Blocking Trophy (1979); 3× First-team All-SEC (1977, 1978, 1979)

Career NFL statistics
- Games played: 114
- Games started: 87
- Fumble recoveries: 3
- Stats at Pro Football Reference
- Pro Football Hall of Fame

Dwight Eugene Stephenson (born November 20, 1957) is an American former professional football player who was a center for the Miami Dolphins of the National Football League (NFL) from 1980 to 1987. He played college football for the Alabama Crimson Tide. Stephenson was inducted into the Pro Football Hall of Fame in 1998.

== Early life and college ==
Stephenson was born in Murfreesboro, North Carolina. He played college football at the University of Alabama under coach Bear Bryant. Bryant called Stephenson the best center he ever coached, and described him as "a man among children". He was the Crimson Tide's starting center from 1977 to 1979, and was a member of Alabama's back-to-back national championship teams of 1978 and 1979. He was a two-time second-team All-American; in 1978 by United Press International (UPI) and 1979 by the Associated Press (AP) and UPI. "His speed, his foot quickness, was off the chart," said Mike Brock, a former Alabama lineman. "You couldn't compare it to other people who played at that time. There was no way for defenses to deal with him."

== Professional career ==
Stephenson was drafted by Don Shula and the Miami Dolphins in the second round of the 1980 NFL draft. He was used on special teams only until late in the 1981 season, when starting center Mark Dennard was injured. A few seasons later, Stephenson was "universally recognized as the premier center in the NFL".

With the exceptionally explosive Stephenson as offensive captain, the Dolphins offensive line gave up the fewest sacks in the NFL for a record six straight seasons, from 1982 to 1987, which doubled the length of the previous record. He retired from pro football in 1987, after sustaining a severe left knee injury in a play involving New York Jets Marty Lyons and Joe Klecko on Monday Night Football.

Stephenson was voted as an All-Pro five consecutive times from 1983 to 1987. He was selected to play on five Pro Bowl squads over the same span. He was named AFC Offensive Lineman of the Year by the NFLPA five consecutive times (1983–87) and voted the Seagram's Seven Crowns of Sports Offensive Lineman of the Year three consecutive times (1983–85). He started at center in the AFC Championship Game three times, in 1982, 1984, and 1985. He was the starting center in the Dolphins' two most recent Super Bowl appearances: Super Bowl XVII and Super Bowl XIX. In 1985, Stephenson was the recipient of the NFL Man of the Year Award for "outstanding community service and playing excellence."

== Honors and later life ==
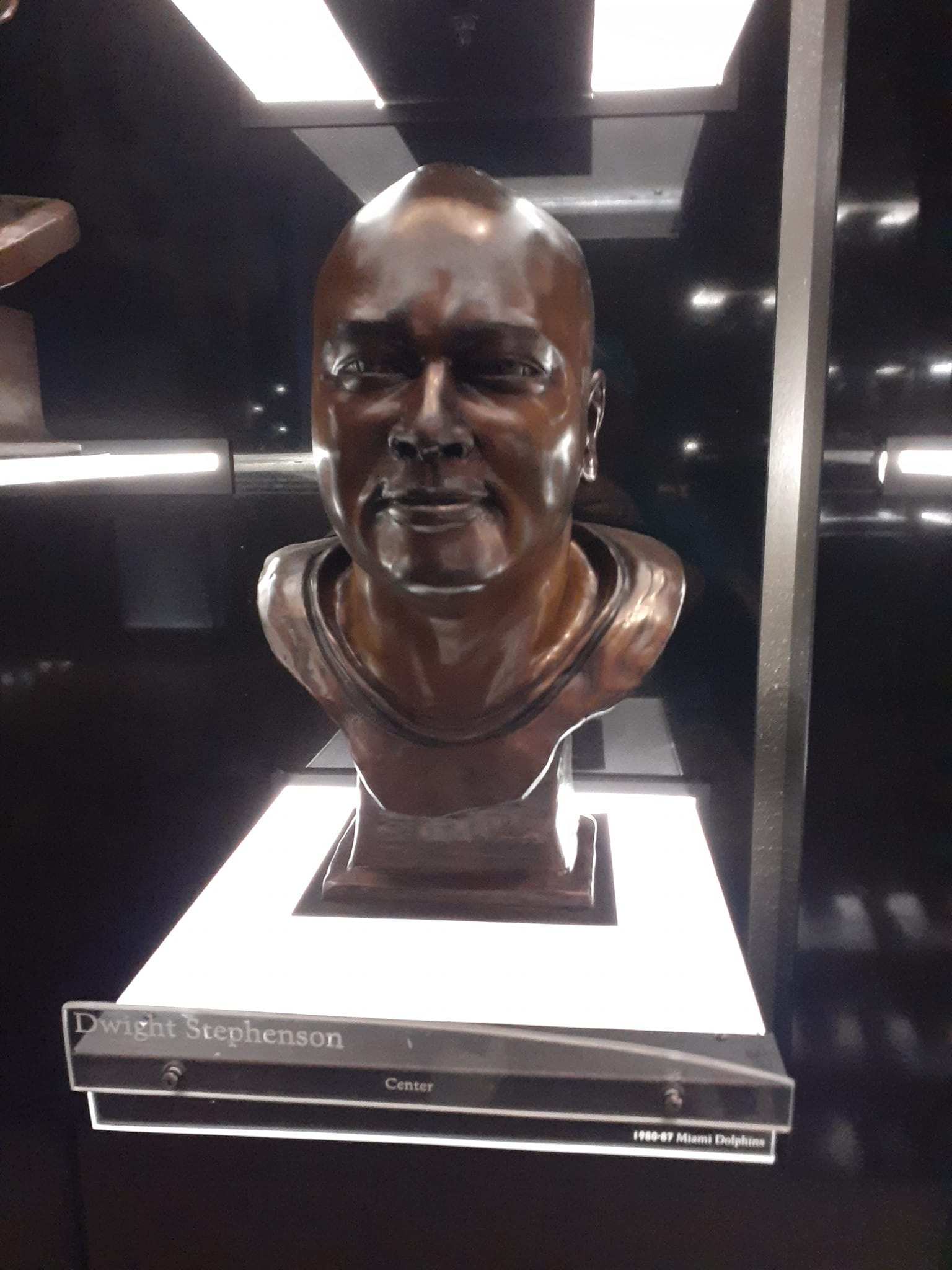
Stephenson's bronze bust at the Pro Football Hall of Fame

On December 12, 1994, Stephenson was added to the Miami Dolphins Honor Roll.

Despite the brevity of his career, in 1999, Stephenson was ranked number 84 on The Sporting News' list of the 100 Greatest Football Players. Also in 1999, he was inducted into the Virginia Sports Hall of Fame, and in 2011, Stephenson was inducted into the Hampton Roads Sports Hall of Fame, for his contributions to sports in southeastern Virginia.

In 1998, Stephenson was inducted into the Pro Football Hall of Fame. He was quoted as saying that "I know I’m not going to make every block, but I don’t like to ever get beat. That’s what keeps me motivated. There’s always the next play to get ready for.”

In 2005, Stephenson was named the Walter Camp Man of the Year.

He is the namesake of Pro Football Focus' annual Dwight Stephenson Award, honoring the player the website considers best in the NFL regardless of position.

After retiring from football, as of 2013, Stephenson had worked as a construction manager and general contractor in Florida. He remains a strong supporter of the University of Alabama's football team.
