= Bill Stanfill =

American football player (born 1947–2016)

No. 84
- Position: Defensive end

Personal information
- Born: January 13, 1947; Cairo, Georgia, U.S.
- Died: November 10, 2016 (aged 69); Albany, Georgia, U.S.
- Listed height: 6 ft 5 in (1.96 m)
- Listed weight: 248 lb (112 kg)

Career information
- High school: Cairo
- College: Georgia
- NFL draft: 1969: 1st round, 11th overall pick

Career history
- Miami Dolphins (1969–1976)

Awards and highlights
- 2× Super Bowl champion (VII, VIII); First-team All-Pro (1972); 2× Second-team All-Pro (1973, 1974); 5× Pro Bowl (1969, 1971–1974); NFL sacks leader (1973); Miami Dolphins Honor Roll; Outland Trophy (1968); Consensus All-American (1968); 2× Second-team All-American (1966, 1967); 2× First-team All-SEC (1967, 1968); Florida–Georgia Hall of Fame

Career NFL/AFL statistics
- Fumble recoveries: 8
- Interceptions: 2
- Touchdowns: 2
- Sacks: 69.5
- Stats at Pro Football Reference
- College Football Hall of Fame

William Thomas Stanfill (January 13, 1947 – November 10, 2016) was an American professional football player who was a defensive end for the Miami Dolphins of the American Football League (AFL) and then the National Football League (NFL) after the AFL-NFL merger of 1970. He played college football for the Georgia Bulldogs. He was a member of Miami's two Super Bowl-winning teams.

== Early life ==
Stanfill attended Cairo High School in Cairo, Georgia, where he was a three-sport star in football, basketball, and track and field. In football, as a senior, he was named the Class AA Lineman of the Year after leading his team to three Region Championships. In basketball, as a senior, he led his team to the state championship and was named the state tournament MVP. In track and field, he added three state discus and one shot put AA titles.

== College career ==
Stanfill played defensive tackle for the Georgia Bulldogs from 1966 through 1968. He was awarded the Outland Trophy in 1968 and was named an All-American the same year. He received a B.S. degree from the University of Georgia in 1971. Stanfill was voted All-SEC in 1966, 1967 and 1968 and was the SEC Lineman of The Year in 1968. In addition, he was an Academic All-America that same season. During his three seasons at Georgia, the Bulldogs had a 26–6–2 record along with two Southeastern Conference titles: one in 1966 (co-champions) and the other in 1968. During that time the Bulldogs also appeared in three bowl games: the Cotton Bowl Classic in 1966, the Liberty Bowl in 1967 and the Sugar Bowl in 1968. Georgia beat SMU in the Cotton Bowl Classic, lost to North Carolina State in the Liberty and lost to the Arkansas Razorbacks in the Sugar.

Georgia's venerable coach Vince Dooley said of Stanfill, "He was everything you'd want in a defensive tackle. He combined speed, size, range, quickness and competitiveness to make him one of the greatest linemen to ever play the game"

In a 1968 51–0 thumping of the University of Florida, Coach Dooley allowed Stanfill to finish the game at quarterback. The game was in a driving rainstorm and caused some hard feelings on the part of the Gator team. According to Litkenhous the 8–1–2 Bulldogs were National Champions that season. However, most other polls and formulas awarded the football national championship to Ohio State University.

Selected to the 50th Anniversary All-SEC team (1933–1982). Also selected the SEC Quarter-Century team (1950–74) and All-SEC 25-year team (1961–1985) and 1960s All-SEC team. In 1984 was voted a member of the Georgia Sports Hall of Fame and was elected to the College Football Hall of Fame in 1998.

== Professional career ==
Stanfill played for the Miami Dolphins from 1969-1976. As the NFL did not officially maintain sack records until 1982, he unofficially led the Dolphins in sacks in 1969 with eight (Still an unofficial team rookie mark that was tied by Lorenzo Bromell in 1998), picked off two passes and returned both for touchdowns. Voted to the 1969 AFL All-Star game. He went to the AFC-NFC Pro Bowl from 1971 through 1974)

In 1970, Stanfill started on the 10–4 Dolphins and again unofficially led the team with sacks, this time with six. The Dolphins, although improving, lost in the playoffs. The following season Stanfill was an All-AFC choice and was unofficially third on the team with 6½ sacks. The Dolphins advanced to the Super Bowl, losing 24–3 to the Dallas Cowboys.

Stanfill was unofficially second on the 17–0 Super Bowl winning Dolphins team with 10 sacks (behind left defensive end Vern Den Herder's 10½) and was voted All-Pro by the Associated Press. He was a consensus All-AFC selection that unofficially led the Dolphins in sacks in 1973 with 18½ and was a consensus All-Pro and All-AFC selection as the 12–2 Dolphins won their second straight Super Bowl. His unofficial 1973 sack total still stands as the team record, although All-Pro Jason Taylor tied that mark in 2002 . On October 7, 1973, Stanfill set the unofficial single-game sack record versus the New York Jets. Two weeks later, teammate Den Herder tied that mark against the Buffalo Bills.

In 1974, Stanfill unofficially led the Dolphins defense in sacks with 10 and was voted a second-team All-Pro by the NEA and Pro Football Writers Association and was an All-AFC selection for the fourth straight season. In November, versus the Buffalo Bills, Stanfill tied his own (and Den Herder's) unofficial game record for sacks, again recording five.

Injuries hampered Stanfill in 1975 and 1976– both knee and neck injured limited his playing time and marked the end to Stanfill's post-season honors. Still, he unofficially recorded 6½ sacks in 1975 and four in 1976. The mark in 1976 did, however, tie him for the team lead on a 6–8 Dolphins team .

In all, Stanfill unofficially totaled 69½ career sacks, which was the team record until broken by Jason Taylor, who now has 131 career sacks with the club (139.5 overall). He also is unofficially tied for fourth in the Dolphins' playoff record for sacks with four (tied with Bob Baumhower).

Stanfill was mentioned by Football Hall of Famer Nick Buoniconti in his induction speech as being an unsung player on the early 1970s Dolphin teams and as being worthy of consideration for the Hall of Fame.

In 2007, Stanfill was voted to the All-Time Miami Dolphins team.

On November 18, 2010, two defensive stars on Miami's 1972 undefeated team – S Jake Scott and DE Bill Stanfill – were inducted into the Miami Dolphins Honor Roll.

In 2021, the Professional Football Researchers Association named Stanfill to the PFRA Hall of Very Good Class of 2021

== NFL career statistics ==
Legend
	Led the league
**Bold**	Career high

=== Regular season ===
Year	Team	Games		Tackles	Interceptions	
Year	Team	GP	GS	Sck	Int	TD
1969	MIA	13	13	8.0	2	2
1970	MIA	14	14	6.0	0	0
1971	MIA	13	12	6.5	0	0
1972	MIA	14	14	10.0	0	0
1973	MIA	14	13	18.5	0	0
1974	MIA	14	14	10.0	0	0
1975	MIA	13	8	6.5	0	0
1976	MIA	14	7	4.0	0	0
Career		109	95	69.5	2	2

== Later life and death ==
Stanfill lived in Albany, Georgia as a real estate broker . He was featured in a Sports Illustrated article that detailed the injuries to former NFL players, which also included Hall of Fame quarterback Johnny Unitas, Earl Campbell, Joe Jacoby, Curt Marsh, Harry Carson and others. SI reported that Stanfill had three surgeries, from August 1993 to January 1996, to fuse four vertebrae in his spine, a problem that started when he jammed his neck during an exhibition game in 1975. According to Stanfill, the surgeries on his spine caused a neck pain so severe he could not tip his head back, had little use of his left thumb, and experienced considerable loss of hand and arm strength. He also had surgery to repair a hip condition that was cutting blood flow to the hip bone.

On November 10, 2016, Stanfill died at age 69 of complications resulting from a fall. He was found to have had chronic traumatic encephalopathy, or C.T.E., the degenerative brain disease associated with repeated head trauma. He is one of at least 345 NFL players to be diagnosed after death with this disease.

== See also ==
- Other American Football League players
- List of AFL/NFL players with chronic traumatic encephalopathy

== Sources ==
- Tony Barhart, ed. (2004). "The Sixties". What it means to be a Bulldog: Vince Dooley, Mark Richt, and Georgia's greatest players. Chicago, Illinois: Triumph Books. pp. 143–146. ISBN 1-57243-645-X.
- databaseFootball: Bill Stanfill statistics
