= Dave Hyde =

American sportswriter

David Warren Hyde is a sports columnist for the South Florida Sun Sentinel newspaper, the main daily newspaper of Fort Lauderdale. He won the National Headliner Award in 2016 (and finished second in 2018) for top sports column writing in the country. He was named Top 10 in column writing by the Associated Press Sports Editors in 2022, the 16th time his work has been in the top 10 of APSE awards. He won the APSE's award for investigative work in 1996. Prior to joining the Sun-Sentinel as a columnist in 1990, he worked as a sportswriter at the Miami Herald from 1985-1990. He has been a Sun-Sentinel columnist since 1990. He attended Miami University in Oxford, Ohio where he was a member of Phi Kappa Tau and a writer for the Miami Student. Hyde has written the following books: "Still Perfect: The Untold Story of the 1972 Miami Dolphins"; "1968; The Year That Saved Ohio State Football"; and "Swagger: Super Bowls, Brass Balls and Football," which is coach Jimmy Johnson's autobiography. His work has been featured in The Best American Sports Writing.
