= History of the San Francisco 49ers =

History of the American football team

The 49ers logo, features an interlocking "SF" monogram inside a red, black, golden oval.

The San Francisco 49ers are an American football team based in San Francisco. They were the first major league professional sports teams to be based in San Francisco and one of the first professional sports teams based on the West Coast of the United States.

The 49ers have won five NFL championships – all Super Bowls. They were the first team to win five Super Bowls (Super Bowls XVI, XIX, XXIII, XXIV and XXIX). They are considered "The Team of the Eighties", winning four Super Bowls in the decade. Prior to the 1980s, the 49ers had never won an NFL championship (they did not even win a division title until 1970). During the 1980s, they failed to make the playoffs only twice—in 1980, and again in the strike-shortened 1982 season which saw them go 0–5 at home and 3–1 on the road—the only time in NFL history that a team went winless at home while winning more than half its away games in the same season.

== Franchise history ==
=== The early years (1946–1979) ===
==== 1946–1949: Beginnings in the AAFC ====
The 49ers entered professional football in 1946 as a member of the All-America Football Conference. They were founded by lumber magnate Tony Morabito, who had tried several times to get an NFL team for the Bay Area, together with Allen E. Sorrell and Ernest J. Turre. Morabito was one of the first to realize that with the advent of air travel, truly national professional sports leagues were now possible. Indeed, the 49ers were the very first team in the four major sports to originate on the West Coast.

The 49ers could never unseat the dominant Cleveland Browns, and had the misfortune of being in the same conference as the Browns. Nonetheless, they were clearly the second-strongest franchise in the AAFC both on and off the field. Thus, along with the Browns and the first Baltimore Colts, they were granted admission to the National Football League in 1950.

The team's name came from the California Gold Rush gold-seekers who came to the San Francisco Bay Area, especially throughout 1849.

==== 1950s: Entering the NFL ====
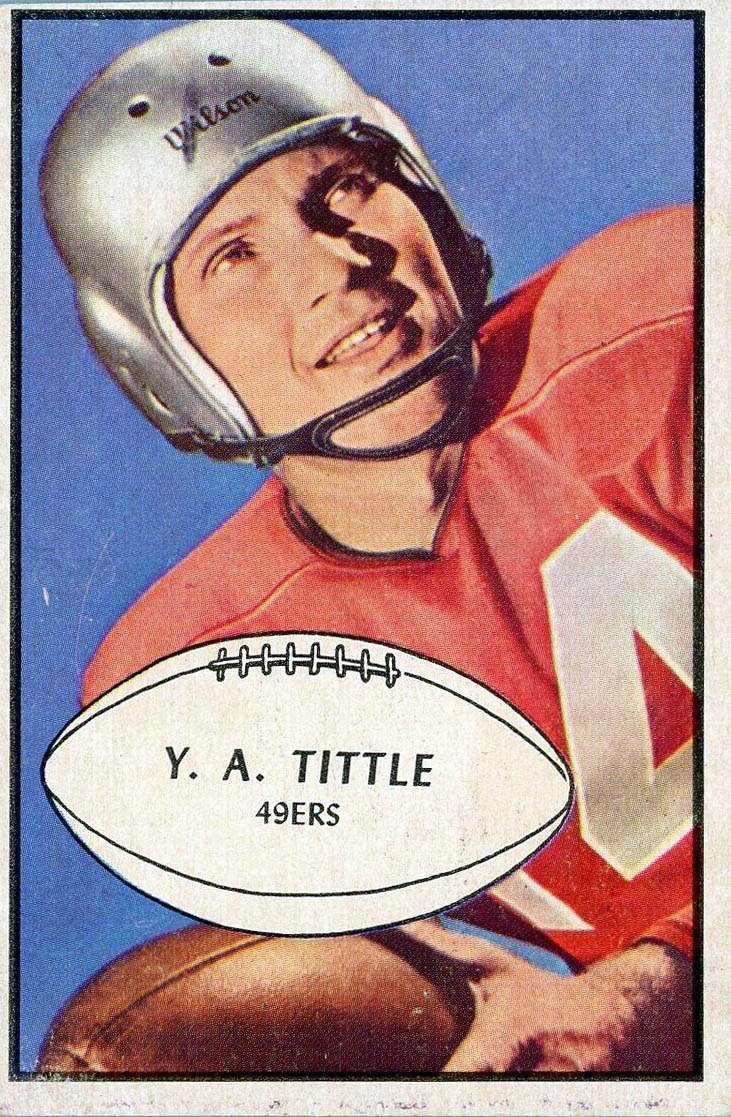
Quarterback Y. A. Tittle

The 49ers' first game as a member of the NFL was a home match with the New York Yanks on September 17, 1950. San Francisco lost 21–17. Unlike the Cleveland Browns, who won the championship that year, the 49ers struggled in the NFL, finishing the 1950 season 3–9. In 1951, they would do much better, with a 7–4–1 season and nearly reaching the championship game. The 1952 season saw seven wins and five losses. With a 9–3 record, San Francisco had its best season yet in 1953, but a loss to the Lions kept them from the championship match. Injuries in 1954 caused a 7–4–1 finish. More injuries (notably to RB Hugh McElhenny) caused the 49ers to fall to a losing 4–8 the following year. With former quarterback Frankie Albert taking over as head coach in 1956, the team went 5–6–1. This period was most notable for the destructive on-field antics of LB Hardy Brown, traded from Washington in 1952. Brown established a fearsome reputation for injuring players by ramming them with his shoulder during his five years on the 49ers roster.

==== 1957 ====
In 1957, the 49ers would enjoy their first sustained success as members of the NFL. After losing the opening game of the season, the 49ers won their next three against the Rams, Bears, and Packers before returning home to Kezar Stadium for a game against the Chicago Bears. The 49ers fell behind the Bears 17–7. 49ers owner Tony Morabito collapsed of a heart attack and died during the game. The 49ers players learned of his death at halftime when Coach Frankie Albert was handed a note with two words: "Tony's gone." With tears running down their faces, and motivated to win for their departed owner, the 49ers scored 14 unanswered points to win the game, 21–17. Dicky Moegle's late-game interception in the endzone sealed the victory.

On November 3, 1957, the 49ers hosted the Detroit Lions, a game which has gone down in local lore as featuring arguably the greatest pass play (along with Dwight Clark's "The Catch" in 1981). With 10 seconds remaining, 49ers ball on the Lions 41, Detroit leading 31–28, Y. A. Tittle threw a desperation pass into the end zone, right into the arms of high-leaping R. C. Owens. The play became famously known as the "Alley Oop". Ironically, the two men covering Owens would later become 49ers coaches: Jack Christiansen, head coach of the 49ers from 1963 to 1967, and Jim David, a secondary coach for Christiansen from 1964 to 1966.

The 49ers would end that season with three straight victories and an 8–4 record, tying the Detroit Lions for the NFL Western Division title, and setting up a one-game divisional playoff in San Francisco. The 49ers got off to a fast start, and in the third quarter led 27–7. The Lions, led by quarterback Tobin Rote, who earlier in the season had replaced an injured Bobby Layne, would mount one of the biggest comebacks in NFL history and defeat the 49ers, 31–27. Had they won the game, the 49ers would have hosted the NFL Championship game the following weekend against the Cleveland Browns. As it happened, the Lions wound up beating the Browns 59–14.

==== 1958–1959 ====
For most of the next 13 years the 49ers would be an average team. Frankie Albert resigned as head coach after a 6–6, 1958 season, and was replaced by Red Hickey. He led them to a 7–5 campaign in 1959, and again in 1960. Key players for these 49ers included running back Ken Willard, quarterback John Brodie, and offensive lineman Bruce Bosley.

==== 1960s ====
During this time the 49ers became the first NFL team to use the shotgun formation. It was named by the man who actually devised the formation, Red Hickey. The formation, in which the quarterback lines up seven yards behind the center, was designed to allow the quarterback extra time to throw. The formation was used for the first time in 1960 and enabled the 49ers to beat the Baltimore Colts, who were not familiar with the formation.

In 1961, primarily using the shotgun, the 49ers got off to a fast 4–1 start, including two shutouts in back-to-back weeks. In their sixth game they faced the Chicago Bears, who, by moving players (e.g., linebackers) closer to the line of scrimmage and rushing the quarterback, were able to defeat the shotgun and shut out the 49ers, 31–0. Though the 49ers went 3–5–1 the rest of the way, the shotgun would eventually become a component of most teams' offenses, and is a formation used by football teams at all levels. The 49ers won six games that year. They won only one game at Kezar Stadium while on the road they won 5 of 7 games (the NFL expanded to a 14-game season that year).

After posting losing records for the next three years (6–8, 2–12, and 4–10 in 1962–1964), the 1965 49ers rebounded to finish with a 7–6–1 record. They were led that year by John Brodie, who after being plagued by injuries came back to become one of the NFL's best passers by throwing for 3,112 yards and 30 touchdowns. The 1966 team had six wins, six losses, and two ties. One of those wins was over the eventual champion Packers. Coach Jack Christiansen was fired after a 7–7 1967 season, which saw the team go on a six-game losing streak after a promising 5–1 start.

Louis "Lou" Spadia, who had been general manager of the 49ers since the early 1950s, continued in that role for the Morabito widows throughout the worst times of the team and into the more successful early 1970s.

For the 1968 season, the 49ers hired as their head coach Dick Nolan, who had been Tom Landry's defensive coordinator with the Dallas Cowboys. Nolan's first two seasons with the 49ers went much the same as the previous decade, with the 49ers going 7–6–1 and 4–8–2.

==== 1970 ====
The 1970 49ers started out the 1970 season 7–1–1, their only loss a one-point defeat to Atlanta. After losses to Detroit and Los Angeles, the 49ers won their next two games before the season finale against the Oakland Raiders. Going into the game the 49ers had a half-game lead on the Los Angeles Rams and needed either a win or the Giants to defeat the Rams in their finale to give the 49ers their first ever divisional title.

In the early game, the Giants were crushed by the Rams 30–3, thus forcing the 49ers to win their game to clinch the division. In wet, rainy conditions in Oakland, the 49ers dominated the Raiders, 38–7, giving the 49ers their first divisional championship, becoming champions of the NFC West.

The 49ers won their divisional playoff game, 17–14 against the defending conference champion Minnesota Vikings, thus setting up a matchup against the Dallas Cowboys for the NFC Championship. In what would be the final home game for the 49ers at Kezar Stadium the 49ers kept up with the Cowboys before losing, 17–10, thus giving the Cowboys their first conference championship.

The 49ers sent five players to the Pro Bowl that season, including MVP veteran quarterback John Brodie, wide receiver Gene Washington, and linebacker Dave Wilcox. Nolan was also named NFL Coach of the Year for 1970.

==== 1971 ====
Following the 1970 season, the 49ers moved from Kezar Stadium to Candlestick Park. Despite its location in the far southeastern corner of San Francisco, Candlestick Park, which was adapted to accommodate both baseball and football, gave the 49ers a much more modern facility with more amenities and easier highway access for fans. In any case, an expansion or remodeling of Kezar Stadium within a public park would have proven controversial.

The 49ers won their second straight divisional title in 1971 with a 9–5 record. The 49ers again won their divisional playoff game against the Washington Redskins by a 24–20 final score. This set up a rematch against the Dallas Cowboys in the NFC Championship Game, this time to be played in Dallas. Though the defense again held the Cowboys in check, the 49ers offense was ineffective and the eventual Super Bowl champion Cowboys beat the 49ers again, 14–3.

In 1971, eight 49ers made the Pro Bowl, including defensive back Jimmy Johnson and Gene Washington, both for the second year in a row, as well as defensive end Cedric Hardman, running back Vic Washington, and offensive lineman Forrest Blue.

==== 1972 ====
The 49ers won their third consecutive NFC West championship in 1972 with five wins in their last six games, making them the only franchise to win their first three divisional titles after the 1970 AFL–NFL merger. Their opponents in the divisional playoffs would again be the Dallas Cowboys, making it the third consecutive year the teams faced each other in the playoffs.

Vic Washington took the opening kickoff 97 yards for a score, and the 49ers took a 21–6 lead in the second quarter. After the 49ers took a 28–13 lead in the 4th quarter, Tom Landry sent quarterback Roger Staubach, who was backing up Craig Morton, into the game. Staubach quickly led the Cowboys on a drive to a field goal, bringing the score to 28–16, and as the game wound down it appeared that that would be all the Cowboys would get. However, the Cowboys would complete the comeback all in the last two minutes. Just after the two-minute warning Staubach found Billy Parks for a touchdown to bring the score to 28–23. Needing an onside kick to have a realistic chance at a game-winning touchdown, Cowboys kicker Toni Fritsch executed a successful onside kick, with the ball going back to the Cowboys. With the 49ers on the ropes, Staubach completed the comeback with a touchdown pass to Ron Sellers giving the Cowboys a dramatic 30–28 victory and sending the 49ers to yet another crushing playoff defeat.

The defeat would have a chilling effect on the 49ers, as they failed to make the playoffs for the next eight seasons.

==== 1973–1975 ====
The 49ers run at the top of the NFC West ended in 1973 with the 49ers falling to a 5–9 record, their worst since 1969. The team lost six of its last eight games, including games to the also-ran New Orleans Saints and Detroit Lions. In the final season of his career, longtime 49ers quarterback John Brodie split playing time with two other quarterbacks, most notably longtime backup Steve Spurrier. The team also suffered from not having a dominant running back, with Vic Washington leading the team with only 534 yards rushing.

In 1974, the 49ers drafted Wilbur Jackson from the University of Alabama to be the team's primary back. Jackson enjoyed a fine rookie year, leading the 49ers with 705 yards rushing. He and fellow running back Larry Schreiber combined for over 1,300 yards rushing. With Steve Spurrier injured and missing nearly the entire year, the 49ers did not have a regular quarterback but did put together a respectable 6–8 record. Following the season, longtime tight end Ted Kwalick left the 49ers to join the World Football League (he would join the Oakland Raiders upon the WFL's dissolution.)

The 49ers dropped to 5–9 in what would be Dick Nolan's final season as coach in 1975, the 49ers losing their final four games of the season. Wilbur Jackson was hurt much of the year and Delvin Williams led the 49ers in rushing with 631 yards rushing.

==== 1976 ====
Following the 1975 season the 49ers traded for New England Patriots quarterback Jim Plunkett, former Heisman Trophy winner from nearby Stanford University (which was also the alma mater of John Brodie). Though Plunkett had shown promise with the Patriots, he had not won there and it was thought that he needed a change of scenery. Monte Clark was also brought on as 49ers head coach.

The 49ers were led by one of the best running games in the NFL in 1976. Delvin Williams emerged as an elite back, gaining over 1,200 yards rushing and would make the Pro Bowl. Wilbur Jackson also enjoyed a resurgence, rushing for 792 yards. Again Gene Washington was the team's leading receiver with 457 yards receiving and six scores.

The 49ers started the season 6–1 for their best start since 1970. Most of the wins were against second-tier teams, although the 49ers did shut out the Rams 16–0, in Los Angeles on Monday Night Football. In that game the 49ers recorded 10 sacks, including 6 by Tommy Hart. However, the 49ers lost four games in a row, including two against divisional rivals Los Angeles and Atlanta that proved fatal to their playoff hopes. Despite finishing the season with a winning record of 8–6, Clark was fired after just one season by general manager Joe Thomas, who would oversee the worst stretch of football in the team's history.

==== 1977 ====
Under coach Ken Meyer, the 49ers would lose their first five games of the 1977 season, including being shut out twice. Though they would win five of their next six games, they would lose their last three games to finish the season 5–9. Playing in San Francisco proved not to revive Plunkett's career as he had another disappointing season, throwing only 9 touchdown passes. Bright spots for the 49ers included defensive linemen Tommy Hart and Cleveland Elam, who made the Pro Bowl, and running backs Wilbur Jackson and Delvin Williams, who combined for over 1,600 yards rushing. Gene Washington again led the team in receiving in 1977, which would be his final year with the 49ers.

==== 1978 ====
The 1977 off-season was marked by a number of questionable moves by Joe Thomas that backfired badly. Thomas's big off-season acquisition was running back O. J. Simpson from the Buffalo Bills. As with Plunkett two years previously, it was thought that rescuing Simpson from a bad situation and bringing him to the area of the country he had been raised would rejuvenate his career. To create playing time for Simpson, Thomas traded Delvin Williams to the Miami Dolphins for wide receiver Freddie Solomon. Thomas also released Gene Washington and Jim Plunkett, giving him only one season, and replaced him with Pete McCulley, his third coach in three seasons.

The 1978 season was a disaster for the 49ers, as they finished 2–14, their only wins coming against the Cincinnati Bengals and Tampa Bay Buccaneers. Simpson indeed led the team in rushing, but with less than 600 yards. It had become apparent that Simpson's knees and body were shot, and he was clearly near the end of his career. Wilbur Jackson also missed the entire season due to injury. Even worse for the franchise was that the first pick of the 1979 draft that they would have had was traded to the Bills as part of the O. J. Simpson deal. Thomas was fired following the season.

However, some of the key players that would be part of the 49ers stunning rise to emergence would begin their 49ers career in 1978. Rookie quarterback Steve DeBerg, who would be Joe Montana's first mentor, was the 49ers starting quarterback. Running back Paul Hofer and center/guard Randy Cross also started with the 49ers in 1978.

=== 1979–1992: Joe Montana and Jerry Rice era ===
==== 1979 ====
The team was led in its turnaround from late 1970s doormat by new owner Edward J. DeBartolo Jr. and head coach Bill Walsh. The former head coach of Stanford University was known for stockpiling draft picks, making excellent draft selections, and patching roster holes by acquiring key free agents.

Bill Walsh was hired to be the 49ers head coach in the 1978 off-season. Walsh was a disciple of Paul Brown, and served as Brown's offensive coordinator with the Cincinnati Bengals from 1968 to 1975. However, Brown did not appoint him as his successor upon his retirement, ironically choosing another assistant, former 49ers center Bill "Tiger" Johnson. Desiring head coach experience, Walsh looked to Stanford University in 1977. He had had some success there before the 49ers tapped him to be their replacement.

Walsh is given credit for popularizing the 'West Coast offense', which is not entirely true. The Bill Walsh offense was actually created and refined while he was an assistant coach with Bengals. The offense uses a short, precise, timed passing game as a replacement/augmentation of the running game. The offense is extremely difficult to defend against as it is content to consistently make 6–8 yard gains all the way down the field. (The true West Coast offense—more focused on the vertical, or downfield, passing game—was actually created by 1960s L.A. / San Diego coach Sid Gillman, and San Diego State coach Don Coryell, who also employed a version of it as head coach of the San Diego Chargers.)

In Walsh's first draft, the 49ers had targeted and traded for Notre Dame quarterback Joe Montana as an early round pick. Montana had enjoyed a storied college career, leading the Fighting Irish to the 1977 national title and a number of dramatic comeback victories, the most stunning of all being his final game, at the 1979 Cotton Bowl. Playing the University of Houston in an ice storm, and with Montana suffering from a bad flu, Notre Dame was down 34–13 in the third quarter. However, Montana led a magnificent rally that culminated with him throwing a touchdown pass on the game's final play to give Notre Dame the 35–34 win.

Despite this, most scouts did not peg Montana as a top prospect. In addition to being relatively small for a quarterback (just over six feet) and slow, Montana's arm strength was considered suspect. Though he did get credit for his moxie and intangibles, most thought of him as a system player surrounded by a great team.

In the 1979 draft, the Dallas Cowboys were placed just ahead of the 49ers. The Cowboys' draft strategy through that time was to take the highest-ranked player on their draft board at the time of their selection, regardless of position. When the Cowboys' turn came up in the third round, the highest rated player on their board was Montana. However, feeling that the quarterback position was in excellent long-term shape with Roger Staubach and Danny White, and desperately needing a tight end, the Cowboys went off their strategy and drafted Doug Cosbie. The 49ers, and Walsh, took Montana.

As Walsh implemented his strategies and game plan, the 49ers had another year of losing, going 2–14. There were, however, a number of bright spots. Despite throwing more interceptions than touchdowns, Steve DeBerg blossomed under Walsh, throwing for over 3,600 yards and completing 60% of his passes. Freddie Solomon also had a good year, with over 800 yards receiving. The running game was patchwork, with Paul Hofer leading the team with 615 yards and O. J. Simpson, in what would be his final season, rushing for only 460 yards and being sidelined with injuries.

==== 1980 ====
The 49ers got off to a strong start in 1980, winning their first three games of the season. However, the team, still not quite ready for the big time, would lose their next eight games in a row, although many of those games were close, and the 49ers acquitted themselves well.

During the 1980 season, Walsh alternated DeBerg and Montana at quarterback. Though DeBerg had played well for the 49ers, Walsh felt the team's best chance to win in the long run was with Montana. He alternated the two quarterbacks, giving Montana some experience while keeping opponents off guard. This strategy of alternating quarterbacks from game to game and during games is rare in football, although it had been employed by other successful teams in the past, specifically the Dallas Cowboys of the early 1970s who alternated Roger Staubach and Craig Morton, and the Los Angeles Rams of the early 1950s alternating Norm Van Brocklin and Bob Waterfield.

In Week 14 of the 1980 season, the 49ers overcame a 35–7 halftime deficit against the New Orleans Saints, who entered the game with an 0–13 record. Led by Joe Montana, the 49ers recorded what was then the largest comeback in NFL history, tying the score in regulation and winning 38–35 in overtime on a field goal by Ray Wersching. Following this performance—Montana's first significant professional comeback—he was named the team's full-time starting quarterback.

A number of key players emerged for the 49ers in 1980. Among them were Dwight Clark, who led the 49ers with 82 receptions and just under 1,000 yards receiving, and running back Earl Cooper, who ran for over 700 yards.

==== 1981: 'The Catch' and first Super Bowl championship ====
With the offense in good shape, Walsh and the 49ers focused on overhauling the defense in 1981. Walsh took the highly unusual step of overhauling his entire secondary with rookies and untested players, bringing on board Ronnie Lott, Eric Wright and Carlton Williamson and giving Dwight Hicks a prominent role. He also acquired veteran linebacker Jack "Hacksaw" Reynolds and veteran defensive lineman and sack specialist Fred Dean.

These new additions, when added to existing defensive mainstays like Keena Turner, turned the 49ers into a dominant team. After a 1–2 start, the 49ers won all but one of their final games to finish with a 13–3 record, which was the best in the team's history at that point. Dean made the Pro Bowl, as did Lott in his rookie season, and Hicks.

Led by Montana, the unusual offense was centered on the short passing game, which Walsh used as ball control. Both Dwight Clark and Freddie Solomon had excellent years receiving, Clark as the possession receiver and Solomon as more of a deep threat. The 49ers running game, however, was among the weakest for any champion in NFL history. Ricky Patton led the 49ers with only 543 yards rushing. The 49ers' most valuable running back, however, might have been Earl Cooper, whose strength was as a pass-catching back (he had 51 catches during the season.)

The 49ers faced the New York Giants in the divisional playoffs and won, 38–24, in a game that was not as close as the score suggests. This set up an NFC Championship Game matchup with the Dallas Cowboys, whom the 49ers could never get past during their earlier successful run in the early 1970s.

As they had earlier in the season (beating the Cowboys 45–14), the 49ers played the Cowboys tough, but the Cowboys forced turnovers and held the lead late. Unlike the playoff games of the '70s, this would end differently. In a scenario not unlike the 1972 divisional playoff, the 49ers were down 27–21 and on their own 11 yard line with 4:54 remaining. As Montana had done for Notre Dame and the 49ers so many times before, he led the 49ers on a sustained drive to the Cowboys' 6-yard line. On a 3rd-and-3 play, with his primary receiver covered, Montana rolled right and threw the ball off balance to Dwight Clark in the end zone, who leaped up and caught the ball to tie the game at 27, with the extra point giving the 49ers the lead.

"The Catch", as the play has since been named by sportscasters, reminded older 49er fans of the "Alley-oop" passes that Y. A. Tittle threw to lanky receiver R.C. Owens back in the 1950s. A picture of Clark's leap in the air appeared on the cover of that week's Sports Illustrated and was also featured in an autumn 2005 commercial for Gatorade.

Despite this, the Cowboys had one last chance to win. And indeed, on the first play of the next possession, Cowboys receiver Drew Pearson caught a pass from Danny White and got to midfield before he was pulled down by the jersey at the 49ers 44 yard line by Cornerback Eric Wright. Had Pearson not have been jersey-tackled, there was a good chance he would have scored a touchdown, as there were no 49ers downfield. On the next play, White was sacked by Lawrence Pillers and fumbled the ball, which was recovered by Jim Stuckey, giving the 49ers the win and a trip to their first ever Super Bowl against the Cincinnati Bengals, who were also in their first Super Bowl.

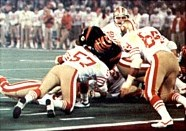
The 49ers playing against the Bengals in Super Bowl XVI

The 49ers would take a 20–0 halftime lead and hold on to win Super Bowl XVI 26–21 behind kicker Ray Wersching's four field goals and a key defensive stand. Throughout the 1981 season, the defense had been a significant reason for the team's success, despite residing in the shadow of the then-innovative offense. Montana won MVP honors mostly on the strength of leading the 49ers on a 92-yard, 12-play drive culminating in a touchdown pass to Earl Cooper. Thus did the 49ers complete one of the most dramatic and complete turnarounds in NFL history, going from back-to-back 2–14 seasons to a Super Bowl championship in just two years.

Montana's success in the playoffs, and his success in leading the 49ers on big comebacks, made him one of the biggest stars in the NFL. His charisma enabled his fame to transcend football. Additionally, it made other teams consider different qualities in players, such as their personalities, rather than just strength,

During their first Super Bowl run, the team was known for its short-range passing game and the play-making ability of quarterback Joe Montana. Later, they became proficient in all aspects of the game, featuring a dominant defense (always in the offense's shadow) and a fast-scoring passing attack (with wide-receivers Jerry Rice and John Taylor).

==== 1982–1983 ====
The 1982 season was a bad one for the 49ers, as they lost all five games at Candlestick Park en route to a 3–6 record in a strike-shortened season. Joe Montana was the one highlight, passing for 2,613 yards in just nine games, highlighted by five straight games in which he broke the 300-yard barrier.

In 1983, the 49ers won their final three games of the season, finishing with a 10–6 record and winning their second NFC Western Divisional Title in three years. Leading the rebound was Joe Montana with another stellar season, passing for 3,910 yards and connecting on 26 touchdowns. In the NFC Divisional Playoffs, they hosted the Detroit Lions. The 49ers jumped out in front early and led 17–9 entering the 4th quarter, but the Lions roared back, scoring two touchdowns to take a 23–17 lead. However, Montana would lead a comeback, hitting wide receiver Freddie Solomon on a game-winning 14-yard touchdown pass with 2:00 left on the clock to put the 49ers ahead 24–23. The game ended when a potential game-winning FG attempt by Lions kicker Eddie Murray missed. The next week, the 49ers came back from a 21–0 deficit against the Washington Redskins in the NFC Championship Game to tie the game, only to lose 24–21 on a Mark Moseley field goal, set up by two controversial pass interference and holding penalties against the 49ers secondary. Washington's win sent the Redskins to Super Bowl XVIII.

==== 1984 ====
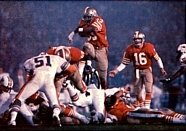
Roger Craig (middle) and Joe Montana (right) in Super Bowl XIX

In 1984, the 49ers had one of the greatest seasons in team history by finishing the regular season 15–1, setting the record for most regular season wins that was later equaled by the 1985 Chicago Bears, the 1998 Minnesota Vikings, and the 2004 Pittsburgh Steelers, the 2011 Green Bay Packers, and finally broken by the 2007 New England Patriots. In the playoffs, they beat the New York Giants 21–10, shut out the Chicago Bears 23–0 in the NFC Championship, and in Super Bowl XIX the 49ers shut down a record-setting year by NFL MVP Dan Marino (and his speedy receivers Mark Clayton and Mark Duper), beating the Miami Dolphins 38–16. Their entire defensive backfield (Ronnie Lott, Eric Wright, Dwight Hicks, and Carlton Williamson) was elected to the Pro Bowl—an NFL first. Their overall record of 18–1 including playoffs is also an NFL record (tied by Chicago in 1985 and New England in 2007).

During the 1984 season, fourteen 49ers players came together to record a 45 pop single entitled "We're the 49ers". The song, released as a 45-RPM single on Megatone Records, was produced and co-written by Narada Michael Walden. It mixed elements of R&B, funk, and pop. Prominent 49ers who provided vocals include Roger Craig, Dwight Clark and Ronnie Lott (Joe Montana is noticeably absent, although he would join Lott, Clark and Riki Ellison to provide background vocals for the San Francisco band Huey Lewis and the News on two tracks from their 1986 album Fore!). While achieving some local airplay in San Francisco on radio stations like KMEL, it did not catch on nationally the way the Bears' Super Bowl Shuffle would a year later.

==== 1985–1987 ====
In the 1985 season, Roger Craig became the first NFL player to gain 1,000 yards rushing and 1,000 yards receiving in the same season. The 49ers were not as dominant as in 1984, however, and they settled for a 10–6 record, a wild card berth and a quick elimination from the playoffs when the New York Giants beat them 17–3. In addition, 1985 marked the appearance of newly acquired rookie Jerry Rice who would continue with the 49ers throughout the 1990s.

When the 1986 season began, the 49ers were off and running with a 31–7 win over the Tampa Bay Buccaneers on opening day. But the win was costly; Joe Montana injured his back and was out for two months. Jeff Kemp became the starting quarterback, and the 49ers went 4–3–1 in September and October. Upon Montana's return, the 49ers caught fire, winning five of the last seven games, including a 24–14 win over the Los Angeles Rams, to clinch the NFC West title. However, the New York Giants defeated them again in the playoffs, 49–3. Montana was injured in the first half by a hit from the Giants' Jim Burt.

During the strike-shortened 1987 season, the 49ers led the league with a 13–2 record, including a 41–0 rout of the Bears in Week 14, because it turned out that the latter's feared defense was vulnerable to Bill Walsh's short passing game. But San Francisco failed to win a playoff game for the third year in a row when they fell to the Minnesota Vikings 36–14. The loss to the Vikings was a stunning upset considering the 49ers that year were ranked No. 1 on both offense and defense, making them the odds-on favorite to go to the Super Bowl. 1987 marked the first of six seasons when the 49ers had two Hall of Fame quarterbacks on the roster: from 1987 through 1992, Montana's backup (and frequent replacement) was Steve Young.

==== 1988 ====
In 1988, the 49ers struggled. At one point, they were 6–5 and in danger of missing the playoffs but rose to defeat the Washington Redskins on a Monday night, eventually finishing the season at 10–6. They gained a measure of revenge by thrashing the Minnesota Vikings 34–9 in the first round. The 49ers then traveled to Chicago's Soldier Field, where the chill factor at game-time was −26 °F (−32 °C). They defeated the Chicago Bears 28–3 in an NFC Championship game upset.

The win over the Bears gave the 49ers their third trip to the Super Bowl: Super Bowl XXIII, in Miami. However, the game was tied 3–3 at halftime, the 49ers having missed a few scoring opportunities. A late Cincinnati field goal seemed to seal the victory, but they left too much time for Joe Montana to work his magic. He drove the team 92 yards for the winning touchdown on a pass to John Taylor with only 34 seconds left. Final score: 20–16 49ers.

==== 1989 ====
The following year, coach Bill Walsh retired, and his defensive coordinator and handpicked successor, George Seifert, took over head coaching duties. The 49ers then steamrolled through the league to finish 14–2 and gain home-field advantage throughout the playoffs. Their two losses were by a combined 5 points. In the first round, they crushed the Vikings, 41–13. In the NFC Championship game, they blew out the Los Angeles Rams 30–3 before crushing the Denver Broncos 55–10 in Super Bowl XXIV – setting a record for points scored and widest margin of victory in a Super Bowl, among others. Montana himself set many Super Bowl records (some since tied or surpassed) en route to his third Super Bowl MVP. In winning the Super Bowl, the 49ers became the only team to win back-to-back Super Bowls under different head coaches. This 1989 championship squad is often regarded as one of the most dominant teams ever, winning all three playoff games by a combined 100 points.

==== 1990–1992 ====
In 1990, the 49ers won their first ten games, and they eventually finished 14–2. They ripped through the season, and the coveted third consecutive Super Bowl victory seemed within reach. In the playoffs, the 49ers dispatched the Washington Redskins 28–10, setting up a conference championship game with the New York Giants. Despite not scoring a touchdown in the game, the Giants took advantage of a 4th quarter injury to Montana and converted a faked punt attempt to thwart the 49ers attempt at a "three-peat". The Giants kicked a last-second field goal after recovering a Roger Craig fumble in the final minutes of the game, winning 15–13 and going on to win Super Bowl XXV.

During their quest for a "three-peat" between 1988 and 1990, the 49ers set a league record with 18 consecutive road victories.

Joe Montana then missed the following two seasons with a recurring elbow injury. Following the 1990 season, the 49ers left team stalwarts Roger Craig and Ronnie Lott unprotected and let them go to the Los Angeles Raiders via Plan B free agency.

In 1991, Steve Young injured the thumb on his throwing hand and later was sidelined with an injured knee. After 10 games, the 49ers had a record of 4–6. Backup quarterback Steve Bono helped the team win five of its next six games with Young sidelined. In the final game of the season, Monday night versus the NFC's No. 2 seed, Young returned and the 49ers embarrassed the Chicago Bears 52–14, finishing 10–6. However, the team missed qualifying for the playoffs by virtue of losing tiebreakers to the Atlanta Falcons. The 1992 and 1993 seasons saw a resurgent 49er team under the leadership of Steve Young, but a sub-par defense could only take them to the NFC Championship game before falling to the Dallas Cowboys each time.

=== 1992–1998: Young in, Montana out ===
In 1992, Joe Montana came back after missing almost two full seasons due to an elbow injury in his throwing arm, and started the second half of a Monday night game versus Detroit on December 28, 1992. With the 49ers clinging to a 7–6 lead, Montana entered the game and looked as though he had not missed a single snap, completing 15–21 for 126 yards and two TDs, as the 49ers defeated the Lions 24–6. By the end of the season, partly fueled by media hype, perhaps the biggest quarterback controversy in football history was in full swing. After discussions with the owner and the coach, and after owner Eddie DeBartolo announced that quarterback Steve Young would be the 49ers starter for the 1993 season, Montana asked for and was granted a trade to the Kansas City Chiefs prior to the 1993 season.

==== 1994: Fifth Super Bowl ====
In 1994, the team spent large amounts of money on the addition of several star free agents from other teams, including Ken Norton, Jr., Gary Plummer, Rickey Jackson, and Deion Sanders. Additionally, several rookie players made key contributions to the team, some becoming season-long starters such as defensive tackle Bryant Young, fullback William Floyd, and linebacker Lee Woodall. The 49ers had some tough times early in the season, including a 40–8 home loss to the Philadelphia Eagles, and a 24–17 loss to the Kansas City Chiefs, led by former 49ers quarterback Joe Montana. Following the Eagles game, a poll conducted on local sports radio station KNBR showed that an overwhelming majority of 49er fans wanted head coach George Seifert fired.

The game against the Eagles was a turning point for the 49ers despite the lopsided score. Young was benched in the 3rd quarter and was later seen livid on the sidelines, shouting profanities at head coach George Seifert. The following week in Detroit, the 49ers trailed the Lions 14–0. After throwing a pass, Young was hit, picked up, and driven into the ground by three Lions defenders. After the hit, Young was screaming with his face dark red in color. He crawled most of the way off of the field before refusing help from the trainers as he limped the remaining way off the field. He miraculously returned to the field one play later (NFL rules state that after trainers attend to an injured player, that player must leave the field for at least one play) to lead the 49ers to a 27–21 victory. The team rallied around Young to win 10 straight games, including a 21–14 victory over the two-time defending Super Bowl champion Dallas Cowboys. During that span, the 49ers' average margin of victory was nearly 20 points per game.

Even after those initial rough spots early in the season, the 49ers finished the season 13–3 and with home-field advantage throughout the playoffs. In their first game, they easily defeated the Chicago Bears, 44–15, setting up the third straight 49ers-Cowboys NFC Championship Game. The 49ers took advantage of three early Cowboys turnovers, taking a 21–0 lead in the first quarter. From that point on, the game was more competitive, but the 49ers held on for a 38–28 victory after Dallas scored a late touchdown, qualifying them for their fifth Super Bowl, and the first to be played by two teams from California. The 49ers steamrolled the San Diego Chargers, becoming the first team to win a record five Super Bowls. With a record 6 touchdown passes, Steve Young was named the game's MVP. Their run of 5 Super Bowl wins in 14 seasons (1981–1994) solidified them as one of the all-time greatest NFL teams.

==== 1995–1997 ====
The 49ers made the playoffs in 1995, 1996, and 1997, being eliminated each season by the Green Bay Packers, including a 23–10 loss at Candlestick in the 1997 NFC Championship game.

===== 1998 =====
In 1998, Steve Young led the 49ers to a 12–4 record and their 16th straight winning season, all with 10 wins or more. Again, the 49ers faced the Green Bay Packers in an NFC Wild Card game that went back and forth for its duration. The 49ers trailed 27–23 in the waning seconds, however, in one last moment of glory, Young hit Terrell Owens on a game-winning 25-yard touchdown pass that put the Niners ahead at 30–27 with 0:03 left on the game clock. However, the 49ers would go on to lose 20–18 in the divisional round to the eventual NFC champion Atlanta Falcons.

=== 1999–2010: Going downhill ===
==== Ownership change: Eddie out, the Yorks in ====
In the late 1990s, Eddie DeBartolo, Jr. was involved in a corruption investigation regarding Louisiana Governor Edwin Edwards and one of his Mississippi riverboat casinos. DeBartolo later pleaded guilty to a failure to report a felony charge in 1998. He was suspended from active control of the 49ers for one year. His sister, Denise DeBartolo York, and her husband, Dr. John York, took over operations of the team.

Eddie DeBartolo returned from his suspension in 1999, but a series of lawsuits over control of the family's vast holdings led him to surrender controlling interest to the Yorks as part of a 2000 settlement. Denise York is now chairwoman of the board, while John York was named CEO.

==== 1999 ====
On the field, the 1999 version of the 49ers got off to a 3–1 start, then in a nationally televised Monday Night Football game against the Arizona Cardinals, Steve Young suffered a blindside hit from cornerback Aeneas Williams that would eventually force him to retire.

Without their future Hall of Famer, the 49ers lost 11 of their last 12 games, and suffered their first losing season in a non-strike year since 1980, which was also the last time that the 49ers failed to win at least 10 or more games in a season.

Young's career-ending injury, and the subsequent losing streak throughout the remainder of 1999 ended a remarkable stretch where San Francisco went 213–75–1 over 289 regular season games dating back to week 12 in 1980; a win percentage of .737.

Bobb McKittrick, the 49ers offensive line coach since 1979, also died of cancer of the bile duct, following the 1999 season. His doctors had previously canceled a liver transplant he needed after exploratory surgery showed his cancer had spread to his abdomen.

==== 2000: Jerry Rice's final season in San Francisco ====
In their first season without Steve Young, Jeff Garcia in just his second season, had his best season throwing for 31 touchdowns, but the 49ers ended the year at 6–10. This season marked the end of an era as Jerry Rice, who played 16 seasons with the 49ers, left the team at the end of the season.

==== 2001 ====
With a 12–4 record, the 49ers returned to the playoffs for the first time since 1998, but lost to the Green Bay Packers in Wild Card round. The defense, who ranked 28th last year, improved to 9th for the season. The season also marked the return of running back Garrison Hearst, who missed the previous two seasons due to an ankle injury suffered Divisional Round against the Atlanta Falcons.

==== 2002–2004: Last gasps of glory ====
In 2002, they produced the second-greatest comeback in 49ers playoff history when Jeff Garcia led the team back from a 24-point deficit to win 39–38 against the New York Giants. They lost their subsequent game to the eventual Super Bowl XXXVII champion Tampa Bay Buccaneers. Following the season, head coach Steve Mariucci—whose published statements about his degree of power in the organization had frayed already-strained relations with management—was fired by John York, despite a winning record. York has since said he made the correct decision to fire Mariucci, but could have handled it better; for instance, he admitted he should have made the announcement himself rather than hand that responsibility to general manager Terry Donahue. The replacement, former Seattle Seahawks and Oregon State head coach Dennis Erickson was signed to a five-year contract. The hiring of Erickson was highly criticized by the fans and the media. During the coaching search, three defensive coordinators emerged as candidates for the job, but the offensive-minded Erickson was chosen despite the fact that Erickson's offensive philosophy was very different from the West Coast Offense.

The period since the 2002 season has been disastrous for the 49ers: injuries, a weak offensive line, and an inconsistent defense. Although they finished the 2003 season with a losing record of 7–9, Erickson was retained as coach for the 2004 season. The 2003 season also marked the end for volatile wide receiver Terrell Owens with the 49ers. Owens scored 85 touchdowns in eight seasons for the 49ers, including four in the playoffs. But his on and off-field antics lead to the 49ers trading him to the Philadelphia Eagles during the off-season.

On September 26, 2004, the 49ers were shut out 34–0 by the Seattle Seahawks, their first such loss in 420 regular season and 36 playoff games, a league record. The last shutout had been 27 years prior in 1977 when they were defeated 7–0 by the Atlanta Falcons at what was then known as Candlestick Park. The 49ers had several chances to score in the fourth quarter, but an interception and a fumble recovery sealed their fate in this game.

During the 2004 season, rumors that the Yorks might sell the team began spreading. Larry Ellison and Pro Football Hall of Fame quarterback Steve Young have been the names most commonly rumored as potential buyers. The 49ers would finish that season with a record of 2–14, and thus finished last in the NFC West division for the first time since 1979, ending what had been the NFL's longest active streak for not finishing last in a division. It was also the worst record that season among the 32 NFL teams, securing them the right to the first pick in the NFL Draft. Erickson and the man who hired him, general manager Terry Donahue, were fired.

After an extensive coaching search, the 49ers announced the hiring of Mike Nolan—defensive coordinator of the Baltimore Ravens—as their head coach for the 2005 season. He is the son of Dick Nolan, who led the team to three consecutive playoff appearances in the early 1970s. Among many NFL franchises, the general manager makes strategic, player and coaching personnel decisions; the 49ers hired a head coach without hiring a GM, indicating that Nolan will likely exert substantial control in all of these areas. In his inaugural draft as head coach, Mike Nolan selected with the first pick of the draft quarterback Alex Smith of the University of Utah. It was a pick predicted by most, though many predicted the 49ers might select local product Aaron Rodgers of the University of California, Berkeley.

==== 2005 ====
Tragedy struck the 49ers on August 20, 2005, when offensive lineman Thomas Herrion died immediately following a preseason loss to the Denver Broncos at Invesco Field at Mile High. Head coach Mike Nolan had just finished addressing the players in the locker room when Herrion collapsed. He was taken to a local Denver hospital, where he died several hours later. An autopsy revealed that Herrion died of a heart disease, which had not been previously diagnosed.

In 2005, the 49ers finished 4th in the NFC West for the second year in a row, but were able to double their win total from 2004, ending the season with a 4–12 record. They ended the season on a high note with two consecutive wins; their first two-game winning streak since 2003. Also, they swept their division arch-rival, the St. Louis Rams for the first time since 1998.

==== 2006 ====
The 49ers finished the 2006 regular season with a 7–9 record and 3rd in the NFC West, their fourth consecutive losing season. The team displayed vast improvement, however. The most impressive victory of the season came in the last week versus the Denver Broncos. The 49ers managed to come back from a 13–0 deficit and knock Denver out of the playoffs in an overtime win (26–23). They also defeated division rival, and defending NFC Champion, Seattle Seahawks in both meetings on the season.

At the beginning of the 2006 season, the team made perhaps their most important decision, awarding the top running back spot to second year veteran Frank Gore from Miami. Gore ran for a franchise record of 1,695 rushing yards, which led the NFC, along with 8 touchdowns. He was awarded his first Pro Bowl appearance as a starter.

==== 2007 ====
Before the beginning of the 2007 season, former head coach Bill Walsh died of complications from leukemia. In the off-season, Cornerback Nate Clements was signed as a free agent from the Buffalo Bills. Clements' contract was worth $80 million for 8 years, the largest contract given to a defensive player in NFL history at the time.

The 49ers started 2–0, winning their first two games against the Arizona Cardinals and the St. Louis Rams. This marked the first time the 49ers started 2–0 since 1998. In the fourth game of the season, against the Seattle Seahawks, quarterback Alex Smith suffered a separated shoulder on the third play of the game, an injury that would severely hamper his play and ultimately lead to an early end to his 2008 campaign after having shoulder surgery. Chiefly due to quarterback Trent Dilfer's struggles and Alex Smith's injury, the 49ers lost 8 straight games from week 3 through week 12, ending the year with a disappointing 5–11 record.

==== 2007–2008: Off-season and end of the Nolan era ====
In the off-season, the 49ers signed quarterback Shaun Hill to a three-year deal and quarterback J. T. O'Sullivan to a one-year contract, they also signed Isaac Bruce to a two-year contract. That raised questions about the future of Alex Smith, whose first three seasons had been plagued by inconsistent play, injuries, and not having had an offensive coordinator remain on the team for consecutive years. Head coach Mike Nolan and new offensive coordinator Mike Martz stated that a competition between Smith, Hill, and O'Sullivan would run through the first two preseason games of 2008, with the hope of naming a starter soon after. O'Sullivan was named the 49ers starter after performing better than Smith or Hill in the first three preseason games. Seven games into the NFL season, the San Francisco 49ers fired head coach Mike Nolan on October 20, 2008. Mike Singletary was named interim head coach. After a poor performance against the Seattle Seahawks (2 interceptions, 4 fumbles) on October 26, O'Sullivan was benched and replaced by Shaun Hill by interim coach Mike Singletary. The 49ers finished the 2008 NFL season with a record of 7–9.

==== The Mike Singletary era ====
On the night of October 20, 2008, head coach Mike Nolan was fired and assistant head coach Mike Singletary, a Hall of Fame linebacker with the Chicago Bears, was named Nolan's successor. Despite positive signs in the improvement of the offense from the 2007 season, there was too many turnovers, and the defense did not live up to its potential causing the need for change.

On December 28, the 49ers, through general manager Scot McCloughan, announced that Singletary would be retained as head coach for the 2009 season; the team won five of its final seven games and went 5–4 overall under Singletary after Nolan's dismissal. Singletary proved to be a fan favorite after a memorable post game interview. On October 27, Singletary said of their loss with him as head coach: "But right now, we've got to figure out the formula. Our formula. Our formula is this: We go out, we hit people in the mouth." The 49ers won their final game of the season, a 27–24 win at home over the Washington Redskins, to end their campaign with a final record of 7 wins and 9 losses. During the locker room announcement, Singletary stated that a four-year contract would be negotiated. It was unclear as to whether or not Martz would be retained as offensive coordinator and Martz was fired only days after the conclusion of the 2008 season.

Also on December 28, the 49ers announced that Jed York, oldest son of John and Denise DeBartolo York (and nephew of former team owner Edward DeBartolo Jr.), was promoted to team president from his previous post of Vice President of Strategic Planning, and would assume responsibility for all day-to-day team operations, with general manager Scot McCloughan and other top staff reporting directly to him. The elder Yorks will assume the roles of co-chairmen, and will continue to represent the organization in various official ways with the NFL.

On April 25, 2009, the 49ers selected Texas Tech wide receiver Michael Crabtree with the 10th pick in the first round of the 2009 NFL draft. This was the first and last pick of the first day of the draft for the 49ers. After selecting Crabtree, they traded their next and only other first day pick along with a 4th round pick to the Carolina Panthers. From this trade they received a first round pick in the 2010 NFL Draft. Other selections for the 49ers included Glen Coffee, Scott McKillop, Nate Davis, Bear Pascoe, Curtis Taylor, and Ricky Jean-Francois.

On May 19, 2009, Walt Harris tore his ACL during Organized Team Activities, forcing the 49ers to quickly sign former Rams, Lions and Broncos cornerback Dre Bly who can be viewed as a Pro Bowl replacement for the lost Pro Bowler.

Although 49er rookies, quarterbacks and selected veterans were expected to report to training camp on July 28, 2009, Crabtree was a no show. He failed to report because he had yet to sign a contract and even several days later his agent, Eugene Parker, still had not reached a contract agreement with the team. Crabtree became the first 49er rookie to be a no show at training camp since 2005. Sources close to Crabtree indicated that he was prepared to sit out the 2009–2010 NFL season and re-enter the 2010 NFL Draft. However, Crabtree's agent, Eugene Parker, went on record to state that he never threatened the 49ers with the possibility of Crabtree sitting out the season and reentering the draft.

On August 30, 2009, Crabtree became the very last holdout and unsigned draft pick from the 2009 NFL draft when Andre Smith, the 6th overall pick, signed with the Bengals. That day was also the 32nd day of Crabtree's holdout, and only 10 days short of the all time long holdout for any 49er rookie in the franchise's history. Beat reporter Matt Maiocco had reported rumors that the signing could have happened around Labor Day, but that did not occur as the sides remained at a complete impasse. Over Labor Day weekend Deion Sanders, an NFL reporter and Crabtree counselor, stated on the NFL Total Access show that Crabtree was indeed willing to sit out the entire season. Sanders also claimed that the rookie receiver was not in "dire need" of money at that time.

By September 9, 2009, Crabtree set a San Francisco 49ers record by becoming the longest rookie holdout in franchise history. The last first round draft pick to hold out for an entire season was quarterback Kelly Stouffer in 1987 when he refused to sign with the Cardinals. Stouffer was eventually traded in April 1988 to the Seahawks for three draft picks, including a first pick in the 1989 draft. The 49ers would have had the option to trade the rights to Crabtree only after March 1, 2010, and up until the next draft. If a team were to trade for the rights, that team would not be able to sign such a player before the 2010 NFL draft. If he was not signed by the 49ers and then traded to another team, his contract would have then counted against that team's 2010 rookie pool.

On September 21, 2009, the 49ers filed charges against the New York Jets for attempting to tamper with their negotiations with Crabtree. The 49ers may believe the Jets contacted Crabtree's agent to let him know they would be interested in trading for his rights, or in drafting him in 2010 with a better salary than the 49ers were offering. The 49ers had until November 17 to sign Crabtree or he would not be allowed to play in the 2009 season along with it being considered a non-accrued season for contract purposes.

On October 7, 2009, ESPN reported that Crabtree and the 49ers had agreed to a six-year contract. ESPN's Adam Schefter reported the deal would be worth $32 million, with $17 million guaranteed, $8 million more than offered by the team in August 2009, but also a year longer.

On October 25, 2009, Crabtree made his first career NFL start against the Houston Texans.

==== 2009 ====
The 49ers had a comparatively unremarkable season in 2009, finishing 8–8 and second in the NFC West, although they defeated the defending NFC champion Cardinals twice; on the season opener and in Week 14 on Monday Night Football. In Week 15, they lost 27–13 to the Eagles, which eliminated them from playoff contention. The final two games were easy wins over Detroit and St. Louis. On the bright side, the 49ers finished at .500 for the first time since 2002.

==== 2010 ====
Optimistic predictions for 2010 were not borne out when the team started 2010, 0–4 after losses to Seattle, New Orleans, Kansas City, and Atlanta. In week five, they hosted the Eagles where bad performance by the team led booing of Alex Smith by 49ers fans. Despite nearly being benched, he came back and began playing better, but it still was not enough and Philadelphia walked away with a 27–24 win. The 49ers finally won in week six by hosting Oakland in the "Battle of the Bay". Alex Smith threw two touchdown passes to lead San Francisco to a 17–9 victory. After giving the winless Panthers a victory in week seven, the team headed to London for an international game with Denver, which they won 24–16. After this, they beat St. Louis in overtime 23–20 and then suffered a home shutout (21–0) for the first time since 1977 while playing Tampa Bay. Next, they beat the Cardinals 27–6 on Monday Night Football before losing to Green Bay 34–16. Despite having only won four games, San Francisco's chances of winning their weak division remained alive and remained so after beating Seattle 41–30 in Week 15. However, the next week saw them blown out in San Diego 34–7. Another defeat in St. Louis finally removed San Francisco from playoff contention and Singletary was fired after that game. With Jim Tomsula as interim coach, the team won a meaningless season ender against Arizona to end 2010 with a final record of 6–10.

=== 2011–2014: Jim Harbaugh era ===
==== 2011: Rise from mediocrity ====
In February 2011, Stanford head coach and former NFL quarterback Jim Harbaugh (the younger brother of Ravens head coach John Harbaugh) was hired as head coach. Harbaugh immediately identified Alex Smith as his quarterback despite Smith being a free agent during the 2011 NFL lockout. Days before the lockout started, Harbaugh gave Smith a copy of his playbook. During the offseason in which Coaches and players could not communicate, Smith organized and led team workouts with offensive lineman Joe Staley. Things got off to a good start when San Francisco knocked off the Seattle Seahawks 33–17 in Week 1. They lost in overtime to the Dallas Cowboys 27–24 in Week 2 on a miracle comeback by Tony Romo, but then beat the Cincinnati Bengals 13–8. In Week 4, they gained an upset 24–23 road win against the Philadelphia Eagles to start 3–1. In week five, They crushed the Tampa Bay Buccaneers at home 48–3 on four Smith touchdowns. With their Week 11 victory over the Arizona Cardinals (23–7), the 49ers snapped their eight-year non-winning jinx to secure a winning season. Smith rewarded Harbaugh with his best season yet as a 49er as they finished the 2011 regular season with a record of 13–3 (winning the NFC West), their best since 1997. This would lead them to the playoffs for the first time since 2002. They would go on to defeat the New Orleans Saints 36–32 in the divisional round, but then lose to the eventual Super Bowl champion New York Giants 20–17 in overtime in the NFC Championship Game.

==== 2012: Emergence of Kaepernick and first Super Bowl loss ====
In the second season with Jim Harbaugh at the helm, San Francisco rolled ahead in impressive fashion, beating Green Bay on their home turf in Week 1. In Week 7 (the bye week), the 49ers stood 6–2. Afterwards, things started to take a strange turn as the team hosted division rival St. Louis at home. The match went into overtime and with neither veteran kicker David Akers or his opposite number Greg Zuerlein able to score, it ended 24–24 for the NFL's first tie game since 2008. In addition to the unusual ending, the game also saw Alex Smith concussed and his spot taken by backup quarterback Colin Kaepernick, who had been drafted from Nevada in 2010 but had yet to see any regular season action. Kaepernick thus started the next week's game versus Chicago. The rookie starter stunned nearly everyone by throwing 243 yards and two TD passes in a 32–7 rout of the Bears. Although Alex Smith was subsequently cleared by team doctors to play, Kaepernick's performance caused Jim Harbaugh to name him starting quarterback until further notice. This move was not without some controversy since Smith had delivered a solid, if not outstanding performance over the last two seasons without any crippling mistakes. Kaepernick's stronger arm and scrambling ability proved a difficult temptation to resist with the added dimension of the "Pistol Offense". Kaepernick's dynamic play added more to his cause by trouncing the Saints in New Orleans in Week 12. But the following week, a bad play at the end of the rematch with the Rams resulted in San Francisco's third loss of the season. Despite this, Harbaugh announced that he was going to continue starting Kaepernick as long as he "has the hot hand".

Colin Kaepernick was named the permanent starter before the first playoff game. Although San Francisco overcame a 17-point deficit against the Atlanta Falcons to win the NFC championship game, the team fell just short of overcoming a 22-point deficit in Super Bowl XLVII, at one point scoring 17 points in less than four and a half minutes in the February 3, 2013, game. The 49ers moved to a 5–1 Super Bowl record with the 34–31 loss to the Baltimore Ravens.

On February 27, 2013, the 49ers agreed to trade Smith to the Kansas City Chiefs for the Chiefs' second round pick in the 2013 NFL Draft and a conditional pick in the 2014 NFL Draft.

==== 2013: Final season at Candlestick Park ====
In the third season with Jim Harbaugh at helm, San Francisco's goal was to return to the Super Bowl after falling short the previous year. San Francisco opened up their final season at Candlestick Park with an impressive win against Green Bay. Colin Kaepernick had a career day as he threw for 412 yards and threw 3 touchdown passes. However San Francisco would suffer back to back losses to Seattle and Indianapolis and started the season at 1–2. San Francisco would get back to their winning ways as they won 5 straight to sit at 6–2 on the season going into their bye. San Francisco would again suffer back to back losses for the second time of the season this time coming to the Panthers at home and the Saints in New Orleans and sat at 6–4, however this would be the last time the 49ers lost a regular season game. In week 16 San Francisco played their final game in Candlestick Park versus the Atlanta Falcons in a rematch of the previous NFC Championship Game. In the fourth quarter Falcons' quarterback Matt Ryan threw two touchdown passes to cut San Francisco's lead 27–24. Atlanta's running back Jason Snelling then recovered the ensuing onside kick as the Falcons got the ball back and were driving for a potential game winning score. However San Francisco's defensive back Tramaine Brock broke up a pass intended for Atlanta wide receiver Harry Douglas and landed into the hands of linebacker NaVorro Bowman who took it 89 yards for the game-winning touchdown (and final touchdown at Candlestick Park) as San Francisco clinched a playoff berth.

San Francisco finished the 2013 season at 12–4 and were the NFC's 5th seed. The 49ers first Wild Card game in over 11 years was a week 1 rematch against Green Bay. San Francisco would set up a game-winning drive and kicker Phil Dawson kicked a game-winning field goal to win 23–20 over Green Bay. In the divisional round, San Francisco avenged their week 9 loss against Carolina and won 23–10, in a game where San Francisco's defense played a key role that kept Carolina scoreless in the second half. With the win, San Francisco clinched their third straight NFC Championship Game appearance. The 49ers travelled to CenturyLink Field to take on the NFC's No. 1 seed, Seattle Seahawks. However San Francisco would turn the ball over three times in the fourth quarter and lost to the eventual Super Bowl champions, 23–17 and were denied their return to the Super Bowl. Key turnovers for the third straight year prevented San Francisco from winning it all. During the game San Francisco lost their star linebacker, NaVorro Bowman to a left knee injury that later revealed was a torn ACL and MCL.

==== 2014: Harbaugh's final year ====
In the fourth season with Jim Harbaugh at helm, San Francisco began its season 1–2 for the second year in a row. Against Dallas, Chicago, and Arizona, San Francisco's offense struggled in the second half, being outscored 52–3, a pattern that would continue the rest of the season. In Week 4 against Philadelphia, San Francisco's defense shut down the Eagles' high-powered offense, however key mistakes by quarterback Colin Kaepernick and the 49ers' special teams kept the Eagles in the game, but won, 26–21. In Week 5, San Francisco welcomed home former quarterback Alex Smith and the Chiefs. The 49ers' red-zone offense struggled, only scoring one touchdown in four trips. However, they won 22–17 with the help of kicker Phil Dawson. The next week, the 49ers on Monday Night Football trailed 14–0 in the first quarter, but scored 31 unanswered points to defeat the Rams 31–17. On Sunday Night Football, San Francisco was overwhelmed by the Broncos' high-powered offense and lost 42–17. Struggles on San Francisco's offensive line would keep Colin Kaepernick under constant pressure in game where he was dropped six times and intercepted. Key injuries on the defense would also play a huge factor. San Francisco's offense struggled again as they failed to score a single point in the second half against the Rams and a goal-line fumble by Colin Kaepernick all but sealed a loss for the 49ers, dropping them to 4–4. Against the Saints, San Francisco's second-half struggles appeared once more in a game where they were up 21–10 at the end of the first half, to trail 24–21 with under two minutes left in the game. Colin Kaepernick however found a wide open Michael Crabtree for a 51-yard gain to set up a Phil Dawson field goal to send the game into overtime. In overtime 49ers' Ahmad Brooks would strip sack Saints quarterback Drew Brees to set up a game-winning field goal. By Week 13 the 49ers were 7–4, however they dropped the next four games and were officially eliminated from playoff contention for the first time since 2010, after losing to the Seahawks in week 15. San Francisco defeated the Cardinals 20–17 in their season finale and finished the season 8–8. After months of speculations, Harbaugh and the 49ers organization mutually parted ways nearly an hour after his final win as head coach of the 49ers, ending his tenure with a record of 44–19–1.

=== 2015–2016: Struggles after Harbaugh ===
Jim Tomsula was hired on January 14, 2015, to replace Jim Harbaugh. Subsequently, Geep Chryst was promoted to offensive coordinator and Eric Mangini was hired as defensive coordinator. On March 10, 2015, All-Pro linebacker Patrick Willis announced his retirement from the NFL due to repeated injuries to both feet. A week later on March 17, linebacker Chris Borland, Patrick Willis' presumed replacement, announced his retirement from the NFL due to fears of the effects of head trauma. These two developments left the 49ers linebackers position group weakened as they headed into an offseason under first year head coach Jim Tomsula. Two other developments during the 49ers off season, the retirements of starters defensive end Justin Smith, and right tackle Anthony Davis, and the uncertainty of linebacker Aldon Smith's availability due to his legal issues.

The 49ers signed running back Reggie Bush, wide receiver Torrey Smith, and defensive tackle Darnell Dockett. On October 22, in a battle with the rival Seattle Seahawks to stay out of last place in the NFC West, the 49ers fell to 2–5 with a 20–3 loss.

On January 4, 2016, the 49ers fired Tomsula after he led them to a 5–11 record.

On January 14, 2016, Chip Kelly was hired as head coach. Kelly's tenure began with an emphatic 28–0 victory over the Los Angeles Rams on Monday Night Football. However, the team went on to lose 12 straight games as of December 16, 2016. On October 21, 2016, in an ESPN ranking of professional sports franchises, the 49ers were ranked the worst franchise in North America.

On January 1, 2017, the 49ers would fire head coach Chip Kelly along with general manager Trent Baalke.

On February 6, 2017, the 49ers would hire Kyle Shanahan to be the next head coach who was the offensive coordinator for the Atlanta Falcons who had an explosive offense in their Super Bowl run during the 2016 season.

=== 2017–present: Kyle Shanahan era ===
==== 2017–2018: Rebuilding ====
The 49ers began the Kyle Shanahan era losing their first nine games of the 2017 season before winning their first game on November 12, 2017, against the New York Giants. The team's fortunes began to change after making a trade with the New England Patriots for quarterback Jimmy Garoppolo on October 31, 2017. Garoppolo made his first start on December 3, 2017, leading the team to a five-game winning streak to end the season at 6–10. However, that momentum would not carry over into the 2018 season as the team struggled after Garoppolo tore his ACL on September 23, 2018, against the Kansas City Chiefs. Numerous other key players suffered injuries leading them to finish the season at 4–12.

==== 2019: Return to the Super Bowl ====
The 49ers revamped their roster before and during the 2019 season, such as drafting defensive end Nick Bosa, signing halfback Tevin Coleman, trading for veteran linebacker Dee Ford, and acquiring receiver Emmanuel Sanders from the Denver Broncos prior to the trade deadline. With Garoppolo back from injury, San Francisco jumped to an 8–0 start and eventually clinched the top seed in the NFC with a 13–3 record, thanks to improved play on both sides of the field. Behind Coleman, Matt Breida, and Raheem Mostert, the 49ers enjoyed a dominant running game by committee, finishing second in rushing yards and first in rushing touchdowns. Coupled with effective passing play from Garoppolo, the 49ers scored 479 points, the second most in the league. Defensively, they surrendered just 281.8 yards per game, also finishing with the league's top pass defense and 48 sacks. In their first playoff appearance since losing to the rival Seattle Seahawks 23–17 in the 2013 NFC Championship game, the 49ers hosted the Minnesota Vikings in the divisional round, winning 27–10, before beating the Green Bay Packers 37–20 in the NFC conference championship game. This allowed San Francisco to clinch its seventh Super Bowl appearance and first since 2012. In the Super Bowl, they faced off with the Kansas City Chiefs, who were making their first trip to the Super Bowl since 1969. The 49ers defense was able to hold Chiefs quarterback Patrick Mahomes and their offense in check for most of the game, and led 20–10 with just over 8 minutes remaining. But a 3rd and 15 completion by Mahomes to Tyreek Hill swung momentum the other direction, and the Chiefs ripped off 21 straight points to win a thriller, 31–20, for their first Super Bowl championship in half a century. With the defeat, the 49ers failed to tie the New England Patriots and Pittsburgh Steelers for the most Super Bowl victories with 6. After the season ended, Nick Bosa was announced the 2019 Defensive Rookie of the Year, having nine sacks, 32 solo tackles, including 16 for loss, and an interception for 46 yards.

==== 2020 ====
The 49ers would collapse during the 2020 season. The 49ers would suffer several losses to the team, including Jimmy Garoppolo and Nick Bosa, resulting in a total of at least 18 players being put in the injured reserve due to either injuries, opt-outs, or cases of COVID-19 within the team. Without many of their players, the 49ers suffered a losing season of 6–10, making them last in their division, and they would miss the playoffs. As a result of the spreading COVID-19 pandemic in the United States, home games in Santa Clara were canceled, and the team was forced to play their last three home games in Glendale, Arizona.

==== 2021 ====
As the season started, the 49ers drafted Trey Lance, a quarterback who was gained in a first round pick (3rd-overall) which was notable for being gained in exchange for its first-round selection (12th overall), a 2022 first-round selection, a 2022 third-round selection and a 2023 first-round selection to Miami in exchange. Despite the draft pick having been influential for the 49ers, Lance would still be benched in favor of Jimmy Garoppolo. Lance would go on to play in just 2 games, winning against the Texans in Week 17. Another notable pick in the 49ers draft was seventh-round running back Elijah Mitchell, who would go on to gain 1,242 rushing yards and 7 rushing touchdowns, as well as one receiving touchdown.

They improved from their 2020 6–10 record and returned to the playoffs after a one-year absence. Despite starting 2–0, they would lose 4 consecutive games. After an embarrassing Week 9 loss to an injury depleted Arizona Cardinals, the 49ers had a disappointing 3–5 record. But they would rebound and end the season winning 7 of their last 9 games, including a dramatic Week 18 win over the Los Angeles Rams in which the 49ers fought back from a 17–0 deficit to win 27–24 in overtime, thus allowing them to finish at 3rd place in the NFC West with a 10–7 record and sneak into the playoffs as the No. 6 seed. During the season, the 49ers showcased a well rounded team, finishing top 10 in both total offense and total defense. The offense averaged 376 yards a game, good for 7th in the league, while averaging 25.1 points a game. The defense was even better, giving up just 310 yards a game, good for 3rd overall. This included the 6th best pass defense and 7th best rush defense. The defense also generated 48 sacks during the season, 5th best in the league.

In the wild-card round, the 49ers upset the Dallas Cowboys 23–17. They would then upset the No. 1 seeded Green Bay Packers 13–10 in the divisional round, thus advancing to the NFC Championship for the second time in 3 years. However, they lost to their division rival and eventual Super Bowl champion Los Angeles Rams 17–20, cutting their season short.

==== 2022: Emergence of Purdy and acquisition of McCaffrey ====
After having an underwhelming start to their season, with notable season-ending injuries, combined with a 3–4 start before the bye week, the 49ers went on a 10-game winning streak to finish at 13–4 and the No. 2 seed of the playoffs after gaining running back Christian McCaffrey in a trade with the Carolina Panthers, improving on their 10–7 record from the previous year after a Week 16 win over the Washington Commanders. With a Week 15 win against the Seattle Seahawks, and with the Rams and Cardinals both being mathematically eliminated from playoff contention, they won the NFC West for the first time since 2019 and clinched a playoff berth, also becoming the NFL's first team this season to win their division. The 49ers swept the NFC West for the first time since 1997, which included sweeping the Seahawks for the first time since 2011. With a 41–23 victory over the Seahawks in the Wild Card round, San Francisco completed a 3–0 sweep of all three games played against Seattle, as well as a perfect 7–0 sweep against all teams in the NFC West. The next week, the 49ers defeated the Dallas Cowboys 19–12 in the Divisional round, defeating them in the playoffs for the second-consecutive season. However, the 49ers lost to the Philadelphia Eagles 31–7 in the NFC Championship in which injuries to third-stringer Brock Purdy and fourth-stringer Josh Johnson during the game and first-stringer Trey Lance and second-stringer Jimmy Garoppolo previously in the season made the 49ers unable to stay competitive.

The season was highlighted by the emergence of rookie quarterback Brock Purdy, taken last in the 2022 NFL draft, who started after an injury to Jimmy Garoppolo (who himself replaced the injured Trey Lance after an injury in Week 2) and went 5–0 as the starter to end the regular season before winning his first two playoff games. Purdy would set several records, including being the first rookie quarterback since Sammy Baugh in 1937 to have at least 200 passing yards and two pass scores in a playoff win, becoming the first Mr. Irrelevant to get a touchdown pass in a game, and being the first rookie quarterback to defeat Tom Brady in his first career start, beating the Buccaneers 35–7 in Week 14. Purdy would end the season with an overall 7–1 record, 16 touchdowns, and 4 interceptions (including playoffs), becoming just one of five rookie quarterbacks to make it to the Conference Championship game. His passer rating of 119.4 was the highest rating for a quarterback in his first five starts since Kurt Warner in 1999.

Former Panthers running-back Christian McCaffrey also had a notable season, despite joining in the middle of the season, as he had 746 rushing yards and 6 rushing touchdowns, 464 receiving yards and 4 receiving touchdowns, and 1 passing attempt which was returned by wide receiver Brandon Aiyuk for a touchdown against the Los Angeles Rams during the victory, in which McCaffrey became the first 49ers running back to record passing, rushing, and receiving touchdowns in the same game. McCaffrey was the fourth player since the 1970 merger to complete the trifecta, and the first since 2005.

==== 2023: Critical player losses and resignings ====
To start the season, the 49ers would lose 14 players to free agency, including quarterback Jimmy Garoppolo, who signed with the Las Vegas Raiders after spending 6 seasons with the team. The team also lost offensive tackle Mike McGlinchey and free safety Jimmie Ward.

The team traded backup quarterback Trey Lance to the Dallas Cowboys in exchange for a 4th-round pick.

After a 44-day holdout, defensive end Nick Bosa, who had recently won the 2022 Defensive Player of the Year Award, signed a 5-year, $170-million contract, including $122.5 million guaranteed. This contract made him the highest paid defensive player in NFL history.

Meanwhile, the 49ers started with a 5–0 record for the first time since 2019 before heading into a 3-game losing streak. They would later finish at 12–5 and later win the NFC West for the second straight season and earn the NFC's No. 1 seed of the playoffs.

The 49ers hosted the 7th seeded Green Bay Packers in the Divisional Round where the 49ers would go on to win the game 24–21. Additionally this was also the first game between the No. 7 seed and the No. 1 seed since the playoff expansion in 2020. The 49ers hosted the Detroit Lions in the NFC Championship Game where they trailed 24–7 at halftime and made a comeback and won 34–31. The 49ers advanced to Super Bowl LVIII, where they once again fell to the Kansas City Chiefs, 25–22 in overtime.

==== 2024 ====
The 2024 season saw the 49ers finish with a 6–11 record, in 4th place in the NFC West, missing the playoffs a year after reaching Super Bowl LVIII.

2025: The Improbable Season

The 49ers won their first game against the Seahawks 17–13 and then beat the Saints 26–21. However in Week 3 the 49ers lost Nick Bosa for the rest of the season. The 49ers then lost Brock Purdy for six games after he had already been out for 2. In Week 6, the 49ers lost Fred Warner for the rest of the season. The 49ers rallied toward the end of the season however with 48–27 win over the Colts and a 42–38 win over the Bears. In both games Brock Purdy threw five touchdowns, the first time since the 1990s a 49ers quarterback achieved that feat. In Week 18 they were in contention for the No. 1 seed in the NFC though a 13–3 loss to the Seahawks ended that hope. Even so, with a 12–5 regular season record they made the playoffs and defeated the Philadelphia Eagles 23–19 in the Wild Card Round. They then moved to the divisional round were they were defeated 41–6 by the Seahawks. Despite all the losses the 49ers 13–6 and even won a playoff game.
