= 1978 Miami Dolphins season =

13th season in franchise history

- Owner: Joe Robbie
- General manager: Mike Robbie
- Head coach: Don Shula
- Home stadium: Miami Orange Bowl

Results
- Record: 11–5
- Division place: 2nd AFC East
- Playoffs: Lost Wild Card Playoffs (vs. Oilers) 9–17
- Pro Bowlers: 2 DT Bob Baumhower; SS Tim Foley

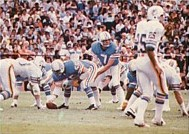
The Dolphins playing against the Houston Oilers in the 1978 AFC wild card game.

The 1978 Miami Dolphins season was the franchise's 9th season in the National Football League, the 13th overall, and the 9th under head coach Don Shula. The team returned to the NFL playoffs for the first time since 1974, with an 11–5 record. Quarterback Bob Griese missed the first seven games due to a knee injury. The Dolphins got off to a 5–2 start behind back-up Don Strock. Upon Griese's return, the Dolphins earned a berth to the playoffs as a Wild Card. Helping to lead the Dolphins back to the postseason was running back Delvin Williams, who set a team record with 1,258 yards rushing on the season. In the first playoff game involving two Wild Cards, the Dolphins were stunned 17–9 by the Houston Oilers at the Orange Bowl. In the process the Dolphins set two notable records: scoring first in all but one of their sixteen regular season games, and never trailing at any point in eleven games. The former record was equalled by the 2004 Patriots, and the latter was beaten by the 2005 Colts.

== Offseason ==
=== NFL draft ===
1978 Miami Dolphins draft
Round	Pick	Player	Position	College	Notes
2	51	Guy Benjamin	Quarterback	Stanford	
3	64	Lyman Smith	Defensive tackle	Duke	
3	81	Jimmy Cefalo	Wide receiver	Penn State	
4	93	Gerald Small	Cornerback	San Jose State	
4	106	Eric Laakso	Tackle	Tulane	
5	111	Ted Burgmeier	Safety	Notre Dame	
6	163	Doug Betters *	Defensive end	Nevada	
7	178	Karl Baldischwiler	Tackle	Oklahoma	
7	190	Lloyd Henry	Wide receiver	Northeast Missouri State	
8	217	Sean Clancy	Linebacker	Amherst	
9	247	Bruce Hardy	Tight end	Arizona State	
10	274	Mark Dennard	Center	Texas A&M	
12	331	Mike Moore	Running back	Middle Tennessee State	
12	333	Bill Kenney *	Quarterback	Northern Colorado	
Made roster * Made at least one Pro Bowl during career

=== Undrafted free agents ===
1978 undrafted free agents of note
Player	Position	College
Steve Arndts	Center	Eastern Michigan
John Bristor	Cornerback	Waynesburg
Rod Broadway	Defensive end	North Carolina
Zac Henderson	Safety	Oklahoma
Gregg Lazzaro	Tight end	Florida State
Robert Moss	Defensive end	Jackson State
Vic Rivas	Guard	Florida State
Mike Shumann	Wide receiver	Florida State

== Personnel ==
=== Staff ===
1978 Miami Dolphins staff
Front office: President – Joe Robbie; Vice President – Don Shula; Executive Vice-President - Mike Robbie; Head coaches: Head coach – Don Shula; Offensive coaches: Offense/Receivers/Passing Game – Howard Schnellenberger; Offensive Backs – Carl Taseff; Offensive Line/Running Game – John Sandusky	Defensive coaches: Assistant head coach/Defense – Bill Arnsparger; Defensive Line/Run Defense – Mike Scarry; Defensive Backs – Tom Keane; Special teams coaches: Special Teams – Carl Taseff; Punting – Tom Keane

=== Roster ===
1978 Miami Dolphins roster
Quarterbacks (QB): 7 Guy Benjamin; 12 Bob Griese; 10 Don Strock; Running backs (RB): 34 Jim Braxton; 31 Norm Bulaich; 27 Gary Davis; 38 Leroy Harris; 24 Delvin Williams; Wide receivers (WR): 81 Jimmy Cefalo; 82 Duriel Harris; 89 Nat Moore; 85 Bo Rather; Tight ends (TE): 84 Bruce Hardy; 80 Loaird McCreary; 87 Andre Tillman	Offensive linemen (OL): 71 Mike Current T; 67 Bob Kuechenberg G; 68 Eric Laakso G/T; 62 Jim Langer C; 66 Larry Little G; 60 Melvin Mitchell G; 79 Wayne Moore T; 65 Wally Pesuit C; Defensive linemen (DL): 76 John Alexander DE; 78 Carl Barisich NT; 73 Bob Baumhower NT; 75 Doug Betters DE; 83 Vern Den Herder DE; 77 A. J. Duhe DE	Linebackers (LB): 58 Kim Bokamper OLB; 51 Rusty Chambers ILB; 57 Sean Clancy OLB; 50 Larry Gordon OLB; 53 Bob Matheson ILB; 55 Earnie Rhone ILB; 56 Steve Towle ILB; Defensive backs (DB): 49 Charlie Babb FS; 44 Charles Cornelius CB; 25 Tim Foley SS; 45 Curtis Johnson CB; 48 Gerald Small CB; 41 Norris Thomas CB; 21 Rick Volk FS; Special teams (ST): 4 George Roberts P; 1 Garo Yepremian K	Reserve: 63 Mark Dennard C (IR); 88 Lloyd Henry WR (IR); 64 Ed Newman G (IR); 36 Don Nottingham RB (IR); 70 Bob Simpson DE (IR); 74 Steve Young T (IR); Rookies in italics

=== Standings ===
1978 AFC East standings
	W	L	T	PCT	DIV	CONF	PF	PA	STK
^{(2)} New England Patriots	11	5	0	.688	6–2	9–3	358	286	L1
^{(4)} Miami Dolphins	11	5	0	.688	5–3	8–4	372	254	W3
New York Jets	8	8	0	.500	6–2	7–5	359	364	L2
Buffalo Bills	5	11	0	.313	2–6	4–10	302	354	W1
Baltimore Colts	5	11	0	.313	1–7	3–9	239	421	L5

== Regular season ==
=== Schedule ===
Week	Date	Opponent	Result	Record	Venue	Recap
1	September 3	at **New York Jets**	**L** 20–33	0–1	Shea Stadium	Recap
2	September 10	at **Baltimore Colts**	**W** 42–0	1–1	Memorial Stadium	Recap
3	September 17	**Buffalo Bills**	**W** 31–24	2–1	Miami Orange Bowl	Recap
4	September 24	at Philadelphia Eagles	**L** 3–17	2–2	Veterans Stadium	Recap
5	October 1	St. Louis Cardinals	**W** 24–10	3–2	Miami Orange Bowl	Recap
6	October 9	Cincinnati Bengals	**W** 21–0	4–2	Miami Orange Bowl	Recap
7	October 15	at San Diego Chargers	**W** 28–21	5–2	San Diego Stadium	Recap
8	October 22	at **New England Patriots**	**L** 24–33	5–3	Schaefer Stadium	Recap
9	October 29	**Baltimore Colts**	**W** 26–8	6–3	Miami Orange Bowl	Recap
10	November 5	Dallas Cowboys	**W** 23–16	7–3	Miami Orange Bowl	Recap
11	November 12	at **Buffalo Bills**	**W** 25–24	8–3	Rich Stadium	Recap
12	November 20	at Houston Oilers	**L** 30–35	8–4	Astrodome	Recap
13	November 26	**New York Jets**	**L** 13–24	8–5	Miami Orange Bowl	Recap
14	December 3	at Washington Redskins	**W** 16–0	9–5	Robert F. Kennedy Memorial Stadium	Recap
15	December 10	Oakland Raiders	**W** 23–6	10–5	Miami Orange Bowl	Recap
16	December 18	**New England Patriots**	**W** 23–3	11–5	Miami Orange Bowl	Recap
Note: Intra-division opponents are in **bold** text.

=== Results ===
==== Week 3 ====
Team	1	2	3	4	Total
Bills	0	7	3	14	24
• Dolphins	7	7	10	7	31

- Date: September 17
- Location: Orange Bowl, Miami, Florida
- Game start: 4:00 p.m.
- Game weather: 82 °F (28 °C); Wind 12 mph (19 km/h)

Scoring summary
1	MIA	Leroy Harris 4 yard run (Garo Yepremian kick)	MIA 7–0
2	BUF	Terry Miller 1 yard run (Tom Dempsey kick)	Tie 7–7
2	MIA	Andre Tillman 6 yard pass from Don Strock (Garo Yepremian kick)	MIA 14–7
3	MIA	Garo Yepremian 49 yard field goal	MIA 17–7
3	BUF	Tom Dempsey 46 yard field goal	MIA 17–10
3	MIA	Gary Davis 65 yard run (Garo Yepremian kick)	MIA 24–10
4	BUF	Frank Lewis 92 yard pass from Joe Ferguson (Tom Dempsey kick)	MIA 24–17
4	MIA	Delvin Williams 18 yard run (Garo Yepremian kick)	MIA 31–17
4	BUF	Roland Hooks 4 yard pass from Joe Ferguson (Tom Dempsey kick)	MIA 31–24

== Playoffs ==
Round	Date	Opponent (seed)	Result	Record	Venue	Recap
Wild Card	December 24	Houston Oilers (5)	L 9–17	0–1	Miami Orange Bowl	Recap

=== AFC Wildcard Playoff (Sunday December 24, 1978): vs. Houston Oilers ===
Game summary

Quarter	1	2	3	4	Total
Oilers	7	0	0	10	17
Dolphins	7	0	0	2	9

at Miami Orange Bowl, Miami, Florida

- Game time: 4:00 pm EST
- Game weather: 77 °F (25 °C), relative humidity 78%, wind 12 mph (19 km/h)
- Game attendance: 70,036
- Referee: Dick Jorgensen
- TV announcers (NBC): Dick Enberg and Len Dawson

Game information
- Scoring
  - MIA – Tillman 13 pass from Griese (Yepremian kick) MIA 7–0
  - HOU – Wilson 13 pass from Pastorini (Fritsch kick) 7–7
  - HOU – field goal Fritsch 35 HOU 10–7
  - HOU – Campbell 1 run (Fritsch kick) HOU 17–7
  - MIA – Safety, Pastorini ran out of end zone HOU 17–9

== Notes and references ==
- Miami Dolphins on Pro Football Reference
- Miami Dolphins on jt-sw.com
