= 1975 San Francisco 49ers season =

American football team season

- Owner: Josephine Morabito-Fox; Jane Morabito
- General manager: Louis Spadia
- Head coach: Dick Nolan
- Offensive coordinator: Dick Stanfel
- Home stadium: Candlestick Park

Results
- Record: 5–9
- Division place: 2nd NFC West
- Playoffs: Did not qualify
- Pro Bowlers: DE Cedrick Hardman

The 1975 San Francisco 49ers season was the franchise's 26th season in the National Football League, their 30th overall, and their seventh under head coach Dick Nolan.

Nolan and his squad entered the 1975 Season attempting to improve on their 6–8 season in 1974. However, for the second time in three seasons, the team finished with a 5–9 record, and missed the playoffs for the third consecutive season. Nolan was let go after the season. DE Cedrick Hardman was the team's only player to qualify for the Pro Bowl.

== Offseason ==
=== NFL draft ===
1975 San Francisco 49ers draft
Round	Pick	Player	Position	College	Notes
1	10	Jimmy Webb	Defensive tackle	Mississippi State	
2	35	Greg Collins	Linebacker	Notre Dame	
3	71	Jeff Hart	Tackle	Oregon State	
3	72	Steve Mike-Mayer	Kicker	Maryland	
3	75	Wayne Baker	Defensive tackle	BYU	
4	85	Cleveland Elam *	Defensive tackle	Tennessee State	
4	87	Frank Oliver	Defensive back	Kentucky State	
5	114	Wayne Bullock	Running back	Notre Dame	
8	191	Preston Kendrick	Linebacker	Florida	
9	218	James Johnson	Defensive back	Tennessee State	
9	223	Dan Natale	Tight end	Penn State	
9	230	Caesar Douglas	Tackle	Illinois Wesleyan	
10	243	Don Layton	Running back	South Carolina State	signed with Edmonton Eskimos (CFL)
11	270	Gene Hernandez	Defensive back	TCU	
12	295	Rick Worley	Quarterback	Howard Payne	
13	322	Dale Mitchell	Linebacker	USC	played with 49ers beginning in 1976
14	347	David Henson	Wide receiver	Abilene Christian	
15	374	Rich Lavin	Tight end	Western Illinois	
Made roster * Made at least one Pro Bowl during career

=== Staff / Coaches ===
1975 San Francisco 49ers staff
Front office: Team Owner(s) – Josephine Morabito-Fox & Jane Morabito; General manager / Team President – Louis Spadia; Head coaches: Head coach / Defensive Coordinator – Dick Nolan; Offensive coaches: Offensive Coordinator = Dick Stanfel; Quarterbacks / Wide Receivers – Don Heinrich; Running Backs – Doug Scovil; Offensive Line / Blocking – Lew Erber	Defensive coaches: Defensive Line – Bob Hollway; Linebackers – Ed Beard; Defensive Backfield / Secondary – Rich Brooks; Special teams coaches: Special Teams – Rich Brooks

=== Roster ===
1975 San Francisco 49ers roster
Quarterbacks (QB): 14 Tom Owen; 16 Norm Snead; 11 Steve Spurrier; Running backs (RB): 40 Wilbur Jackson; 47 Kermit Johnson; 48 Sammy Johnson; 45 Manfred Moore; 35 Larry Schreiber; 24 Delvin Williams; Wide receivers (WR): 88 Terry Beasley; 20 Mike Holmes; 18 Gene Washington; Tight ends (TE): 82 Len Garrett; 85 Bill Larson; 84 Tom Mitchell	Offensive linemen (OL): 79 Cas Banaszek T; 77 Jean Barrett G/C; 71 Keith Fahnhorst T; 68 Jeff Hart T; 66 Bob Penchion G; 69 Woody Peoples G; 54 Bill Reid C; 67 John Watson T; Defensive linemen (DL): 78 Wayne Baker DT; 72 Cleveland Elam DE; 86 Cedrick Hardman DE; 53 Tommy Hart DE; 56 Bob Hoskins DT; 60 Bill Sandifer DT; 74 Jimmy Webb DT	Linebackers (LB): 79 Greg Collins MLB; 59 Willie Harper OLB; 57 Frank Nunley MLB; 52 Skip Vanderbundt OLB; 50 Dave Washington OLB; Defensive backs (DB): 27 Nate Allen CB; 26 Tim Anderson SS; 43 Windlan Hall SS/FS; 37 Jimmy Johnson CB; 33 John Saunders SS; 44 Bruce Taylor CB; Special teams (ST): 10 Steve Mike-Mayer K; 13 Tom Wittum P	Reserve: 78 Rolf Krueger DT (IR); 49 Ralph McGill S (IR); 64 Dale Mitchell LB (IR); 32 Mel Phillips S (IR); Rookies in italics

== Preseason ==
Week	Date	Opponent	Result	Record	Venue	Attendance
1	August 10	Cleveland Browns	W 17–13	1–0	Candlestick Park	45,560
2	August 16	at Los Angeles Rams	L 6–10	1–1	Los Angeles Memorial Coliseum	58,230
3	August 21	at San Diego Chargers	L 7–20	1–2	San Diego Stadium	18,764
4	August 30	at Oakland Raiders	L 21–40	1–3	Oakland–Alameda County Coliseum	52,866
5	September 7	Denver Broncos	W 44–10	2–3	Candlestick Park	45,686
6	September 13	Green Bay Packers	W 24–3	3–3	Candlestick Park	56,267

== Regular season ==
=== Schedule ===
Week	Date	Opponent	Result	Record	Venue	Attendance
1	September 21	at Minnesota Vikings	**L** 17–27	0–1	Metropolitan Stadium	46,479
2	September 28	**Los Angeles Rams**	**L** 14–23	0–2	Candlestick Park	55,072
3	October 5	at Kansas City Chiefs	**W** 20–3	1–2	Arrowhead Stadium	54,490
4	October 12	**Atlanta Falcons**	**L** 3–17	1–3	Candlestick Park	44,043
5	October 19	**New Orleans Saints**	**W** 35–21	2–3	Candlestick Park	39,990
6	October 26	at New England Patriots	**L** 16–24	2–4	Schaefer Stadium	60,358
7	November 2	Detroit Lions	**L** 17–28	2–5	Candlestick Park	43,209
8	November 9	at **Los Angeles Rams**	**W** 24–23	3–5	Los Angeles Memorial Coliseum	74,064
9	November 16	Chicago Bears	**W** 31–3	4–5	Candlestick Park	41,726
10	November 23	at **New Orleans Saints**	**W** 16–6	5–5	Louisiana Superdome	40,328
11	November 30	at Philadelphia Eagles	**L** 17–27	5–6	Veterans Stadium	56,694
12	December 7	Houston Oilers	**L** 13–27	5–7	Candlestick Park	44,015
13	December 14	at **Atlanta Falcons**	**L** 9–31	5–8	Atlanta–Fulton County Stadium	38,501
14	December 21	New York Giants	**L** 23–26	5–9	Candlestick Park	34,354
Note: Intra-division opponents are in **bold** text.

=== Standings ===
NFC West
	W	L	T	PCT	DIV	CONF	PF	PA	STK
Los Angeles Rams^{(2)}	12	2	0	.857	5–1	9–2	312	135	W6
San Francisco 49ers	5	9	0	.357	3–3	4–7	255	286	L4
Atlanta Falcons	4	10	0	.286	3–3	3–8	240	289	L1
New Orleans Saints	2	12	0	.143	1–5	2–9	165	360	L7

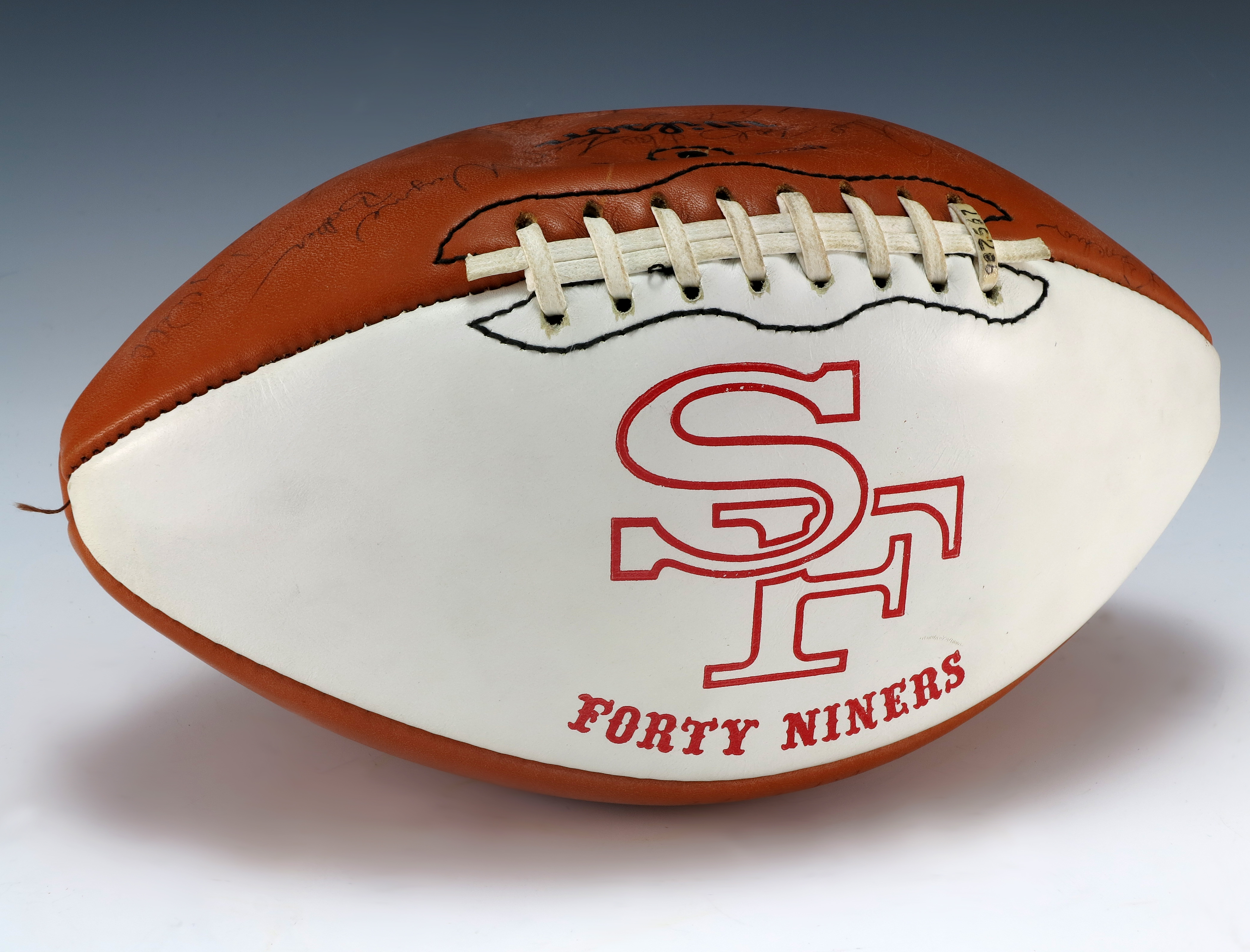
A football signed by the 1975 San Francisco 49ers team, including Steve Spurrier.
