= 1976 Miami Dolphins season =

11th season in franchise history

- Head coach: Don Shula
- Home stadium: Orange Bowl

Results
- Record: 6–8
- Division place: 3rd AFC East
- Playoffs: Did not qualify
- Pro Bowlers: 4 QB Bob Griese; G Bob Kuechenberg; C Jim Langer; PR/KR Nat Moore

The 1976 Miami Dolphins season was the team's 11th, and seventh as a member of the National Football League (NFL). The Dolphins failed to improve on their previous season's 10–4 record, winning only six games. One of these wins came over their new in-state rivals, the Tampa Bay Buccaneers, who proceeded to lose all 14 games that year. The 6–8 finish marked the first losing record of head coach Don Shula's career.

The Dolphins would not have another losing season until the 1988 Season.

== Offseason ==
=== 1976 expansion draft ===
Miami Dolphins selected during the expansion draft
Round	Overall	Name	Position	Expansion team
0	0	Bruce Elia	Linebacker	Tampa Bay Buccaneers
0	0	Norm Evans	Offensive tackle	Seattle Seahawks
0	0	Doug Swift	Linebacker	Tampa Bay Buccaneers

=== NFL draft ===
1976 Miami Dolphins draft
Round	Pick	Player	Position	College	Notes
1	17	Larry Gordon	Linebacker	Arizona State	
1	19	Kim Bokamper *	Defensive end	San Jose State	
2	49	Loaird McCreary	Tight end	Tennessee State	
3	80	Duriel Harris	Wide receiver	New Mexico State	
4	98	Melvin Mitchell	Guard	Tennessee State	
6	174	Gary Davis	Running back	Cal Poly-SLO	
7	185	Joe Ingersoll	Guard	UNLV	
7	200	John Owens	Defensive end	Tennessee State	
8	230	Bob Simpson	Defensive end	Colorado	
9	257	Norris Thomas	Defensive back	Southern Miss	
10	281	Gary Fencik *	Safety	Yale	
10	282	Don Testerman	Running back	Clemson	
11	312	Dexter Pride	Running back	Minnesota	
12	339	Randy Young	Tackle	Iowa State	
12	342	Darryl Brandford	Defensive tackle	Northwestern	
13	366	Bernie Head	Center	Tulsa	
14	396	Bob Gissler	Linebacker	South Dakota State	
15	423	Ron Holmes	Running back	Utah State	
16	450	Mike Green	Punter	Ohio	
17	480	Jeff Grantz	Quarterback	South Carolina	
Made roster * Made at least one Pro Bowl during career

== Personnel ==
=== Coaches / Staff ===
1976 Miami Dolphins staff
Front office: President – Joe Robbie; Vice President – Don Shula; Director of Player Personnel – Bobby Beathard; Head coaches: Head Coach – Don Shula; Offensive coaches: Offense/Receivers/Passing Game – Howard Schnellenberger; Offensive Backs – Carl Taseff; Offensive Line/Running Game – John Sandusky	Defensive coaches: Assistant Head Coach/Defense – Bill Arnsparger; Defensive Line/Run Defense – Mike Scarry; Linebackers/Pass Defense – Don Doll; Defensive Backs – Tom Keane; Special teams coaches: Special Teams – Carl Taseff; Punting – Tom Keane; Strength and conditioning: None - N/A

=== Roster ===
1976 Miami Dolphins roster
Quarterbacks (QB): 12 Bob Griese; 15 Earl Morrall; 10 Don Strock; Running backs (RB): 31 Norm Bulaich; 27 Gary Davis; 35 Clayton Heath; 32 Benny Malone; 36 Don Nottingham; 33 Stan Winfrey; Wide receivers (WR): 26 Duriel Harris; 82 Ike Hill; 86 Freddie Solomon; Tight ends (TE): 88 Jim Mandich; 80 Loaird McCreary; 87 Andre Tillman	Offensive linemen (OL): 71 Darryl Carlton T; 78 Tom Drougas T; 67 Bob Kuechenberg G; 62 Jim Langer C; 66 Larry Little G/T; 68 Melvin Mitchell T; 79 Wayne Moore G; 64 Ed Newman G; 65 Wally Pesuit G/T; Defensive linemen (DL): 70 John Andrews DE; 74 Randy Crowder DT; 83 Vern Den Herder DE; 72 Bob Heinz DT; 60 Don Reese DT; 84 Bill Stanfill DE	Linebackers (LB): 85 Nick Buoniconti MLB; 51 Rusty Chambers OLB; 50 Larry Gordon OLB; 53 Bob Matheson OLB; 56 Steve Towle MLB; Defensive backs (DB): 40 Dick Anderson SS; 49 Charlie Babb SS; 46 Ted Bachman CB; 48 Ken Ellis CB/FS; 45 Curtis Johnson CB; 41 Jeris White CB; Special teams (ST): 20 Larry Seiple P; 1 Garo Yepremian K	Reserve: 58 Kim Bokamper LB (IR); 75 Manny Fernandez DT (IR); 25 Tim Foley CB (IR); 44 Barry Hill S (IR); 43 Mike Holmes WR (IR); 57 Mike Kolen LB (IR); 89 Nat Moore WR (IR); 55 Earnie Rhone LB (IR); 81 Howard Twilley WR (IR); Rookies in italics

== Regular season ==
=== Schedule ===
Week	Date	Opponent	Result	Record	Venue	Attendance
1	September 13	at **Buffalo Bills**	**W** 30–21	1–0	Rich Stadium	77,683
2	September 19	at **New England Patriots**	**L** 14–30	1–1	Schaefer Stadium	46,053
3	September 26	**New York Jets**	**W** 16–0	2–1	Miami Orange Bowl	49,754
4	October 3	Los Angeles Rams	**L** 28–31	2–2	Miami Orange Bowl	60,753
5	October 10	at **Baltimore Colts**	**L** 14–28	2–3	Memorial Stadium	58,832
6	October 17	Kansas City Chiefs	**L** 17–20 (OT)	2–4	Miami Orange Bowl	43,325
7	October 24	at Tampa Bay Buccaneers	**W** 23–20	3–4	Tampa Stadium	61,437
8	October 31	**New England Patriots**	**W** 10–3	4–4	Miami Orange Bowl	52,863
9	November 7	at **New York Jets**	**W** 27–7	5–4	Shea Stadium	53,344
10	November 14	at Pittsburgh Steelers	**L** 3–14	5–5	Three Rivers Stadium	48,945
11	November 22	**Baltimore Colts**	**L** 16–17	5–6	Miami Orange Bowl	62,104
12	November 28	at Cleveland Browns	**L** 13–17	5–7	Cleveland Municipal Stadium	74,715
13	December 5	**Buffalo Bills**	**W** 45–27	6–7	Miami Orange Bowl	43,475
14	December 11	Minnesota Vikings	**L** 7–29	6–8	Miami Orange Bowl	46,543
Note: Intra-division opponents are in **bold** text.

=== Standings ===
AFC East
	W	L	T	PCT	DIV	CONF	PF	PA	STK
^{(2)} Baltimore Colts	11	3	0	.786	7–1	11–1	417	246	W1
^{(4)} New England Patriots	11	3	0	.786	6–2	10–2	376	236	W6
Miami Dolphins	6	8	0	.429	5–3	6–6	263	264	L1
New York Jets	3	11	0	.214	2–6	3–9	169	383	L4
Buffalo Bills	2	12	0	.143	0–8	2–10	245	363	L10
