= List of Amherst Mammoths in the NFL draft =

This is a list of Amherst Mammoths football players in the NFL draft.

== Key ==
| B | Back | K | Kicker | NT | Nose tackle |
| C | Center | LB | Linebacker | FB | Fullback |
| DB | Defensive back | P | Punter | HB | Halfback |
| DE | Defensive end | QB | Quarterback | WR | Wide receiver |
| DT | Defensive tackle | RB | Running back | G | Guard |
| E | End | T | Offensive tackle | TE | Tight end |

| = Pro Bowler |
| = Hall of Famer |

== Selections ==
| Year | Round | Pick | Player | Team | Position |
|---|---|---|---|---|---|
| 1972 | 13 | 338 | Jean Fugett | Dallas Cowboys | TE |
| 1974 | 7 | 174 | Freddie Scott | Baltimore Colts | WR |
| 1978 | 8 | 217 | Sean Clancy | Miami Dolphins | LB |
| 1978 | 9 | 232 | Bill Swiacki Jr. | New York Giants | TE |
