= Tommy Hart =

American football player, coach and executive (1944–2024)

No. 53
- Positions: Defensive end, Linebacker

Personal information
- Born: November 7, 1944; Macon, Georgia, U.S.
- Died: November 20, 2024 (aged 80)
- Listed height: 6 ft 4 in (1.93 m)
- Listed weight: 245 lb (111 kg)

Career information
- High school: Ballard (Macon)
- College: Morris Brown
- NFL draft: 1968: 10th round, 261st overall pick

Career history

Playing
- San Francisco 49ers (1968–1977); Chicago Bears (1978–1979); New Orleans Saints (1980)

Coaching
- San Francisco 49ers (1983–1991); Dallas Cowboys (1996–1997)

Operations
- San Francisco 49ers (1992–1993) Scout; Dallas Cowboys (1998–2005) Scout

Awards and highlights
- As player: All-Pro (1976); Pro Bowl (1976); As coach: 3× Super Bowl champion (XIX, XXIII, XXIV)

Career NFL statistics
- Fumble recoveries: 8
- Interceptions: 2
- Touchdowns: 2
- Sacks: 83
- Stats at Pro Football Reference

Tommy Lee Hart (November 7, 1944 – November 20, 2024) was an American professional football player who was a defensive end in the National Football League (NFL) for the San Francisco 49ers, Chicago Bears and New Orleans Saints. He played college football for the Morris Brown Wolverines. Hart was a defensive line coach for the 49ers from 1983 to 1991 and for the Dallas Cowboys from 1996 to 1997. His was selected to the Pro Bowl and as an All-Pro in 1976, after leading a 49ers' defense with 17 quarterback sacks. The 1976 49ers unofficially set the team record for quarterback sacks (61, in 14 games). Hart coached the 49ers' defensive line on the 1985 team that officially had 60 sacks in 16 games. Hart had six quarterback sacks in a single game, also causing three fumbles, against the Los Angeles Rams in 1976.

== Early life ==
Hart was born on November 7, 1944, in Macon, Georgia, to Anthonia and Minnie Lee Hart. The Harts had 10 children in total, but two died. Hart was the second oldest. The family worked farmland and raised cattle, but was not financially well off. The only source of heat in their home was a fireplace; and Hart had a lifelong aversion to cold weather. His father worked as a woodcutter.

Hart attended Ballard-Hudson High School, where he was a three-year starter on the school's football team under head coach Robert Slocum; playing both offensive and defensive tackle. Hart was the team's most valuable player during his senior season (1963). Hart had a long bus ride to and from school each day, and a long walk from the bus stop to his home. On days he missed the bus home because of football practice, Hart would have to walk all the way home from school; and might not arrive until 11:00 o’clock at night.

He also played on the school's baseball team from 1962 to 1964, where one of his teammates was future Major League Baseball pitcher John "Blue Moon" Odom. He was also on the track and field team. In May 1963, he received the Atlanta Life Insurance Award as Ballard-Hudson's best all-around athlete.

== College career ==
Hart attended Morris Brown College in Atlanta, part of the Southern Intercollegiate Athletic Conference (SIAC). He originally believed he had received a football scholarship from Morris Brown, and came to the school to practice with the football team. Upon arriving, Hart learned he did not have such a scholarship. Though Hart considered returning home that day, he went ahead and scrimmaged with the football team. He was offered a four-year scholarship the next day.

He earned four letters at Morris Brown in football, and played as an offensive guard, offensive tackle, defensive end, defensive tackle, and linebacker. Hart said he was more of a linebacker than a tackle at Morris Brown. He was a three-time All-SIAC selection in football. In 1966, he was All-SIAC at linebacker. He was named second-team NAIA All-American as a senior (1967). Future NFL defensive back George Atkinson was among his Morris Brown teammates.

Hart also earned three letters in track as a sprinter and shot putter. Coming out of college, Hart reportedly ran the 40-yard dash in either 4.5 or 4.7 seconds, the 100-yard dash in 9.7 seconds, and the 440-yard dash in 48 seconds; and threw the shot put 52 feet. He also won track titles in the discus throw and 220-yard dash.

== Professional career ==
=== San Francisco 49ers ===
Hart was selected by the San Francisco 49ers in the 10th round of the 1968 NFL/AFL draft, 261st overall. Hart was originally drafted as a linebacker, weighing only 213 lb (96.6 kg). As a rookie, he was a reserve linebacker and special teams player, appearing in only five games, after being activated to play by the 49ers in mid-November. Hart was placed on the military reserve list in early September 1968, and was in the military for part of the 1968 season. He was also on the 49ers taxi squad for part of his rookie season. In a mid-December 1968 game with the 49ers, Hart blocked an extra point conversion attempt in a 14–12 win over the Atlanta Falcons. After the season, 49ers' linebacker coach Mike Giddings made a strong argument that the team should keep Hart going into the next season.

Among other things, Hart had dental issues that affected his eating and kept his weight down. The 49ers addressed that issue, and put Hart on a program to gain weight through eating the right foods and undergoing intensive physical training. He was up to 243 lb (110.2 kg) by his second year with the team. Hart was made a reserve defensive end and special teams player in his second season (1969), appearing in 14 games without starting any. Although still light by defensive end standards in the NFL, Hart had a powerful physique and huge hands. Hart also believed his speed made up for his lack of weight.

Before the beginning of his third season in 1970, Hart continued to be listed as a reserve defensive end and special teams player. He came into training camp at 255 lb (115.7 kg) or 260 lb (117.9 kg), but was down to 245 lb (111 kg) during the season. In training camp before his rookie season in 1968, while still at his linebacker weight, Hart had run the 40-yard dash in 4.5 seconds. In testing to see if his weight gain had slowed him down, Hart still ran the 40-yard dash in 4.5 seconds during the 1970 preseason.

Instead of playing as a reserve as he had in 1969, Hart started all 14 games at left defensive end in 1970; and would go on to start every 49ers game at left defensive end from 1970 through 1977. He had 5.5 quarterback sacks, two fumble recoveries and an interception in 1970. Defensive line coach Paul Wiggin had the biggest influence on Hart's development as a defensive end. The 49ers had started Hart in place of the injured Stan Hindman to begin the season. In the first game of 1970, against the Washington Redskins, Hart sacked future Hall of Fame quarterback Sonny Jurgensen three times, and blocked one of his passes. Wiggin said after two games that Hart had played so well Hindman would have to win the job back from Hart once he returned from injury. Even after becoming a starter, the 49ers used Hart on special teams because of his speed (though Hart himself believed he would have more energy to play defense if he did not have to play on special teams because of the full out running required).

Hart made a key play during the 49ers divisional round playoff 17–14 win over the Minnesota Vikings, on December 27, 1970. Hart sacked Vikings quarterback Gary Cuozzo for a seven- or eight-yard loss, with the 49ers ahead, 10–7. This led to Minnesota kicker Fred Cox's ensuing field goal attempt falling five-yards short. The 49ers then drove 80 yards for the game-winning touchdown. The 49ers lost the 1970 NFC Championship Game to the Dallas Cowboys, 17–10; Hart starting in that game. Hart suffered a knee injury in that game when three Cowboys players blocked him during a kickoff return.

In 1971, Hart again started all 14 49ers' games at left defensive end, with six sacks and two fumble recoveries that season. In a late October game against the St. Louis Cardinals, Hart recovered a fumble after 49ers right defensive end Cedrick Hardman sacked quarterback Pete Beathard, and returned it 63 yards for a touchdown. The 49ers won the NFC West Division that season with a 9–5 record, and then defeated the Washington Redskins in the divisional round of the playoffs, 24–20. The 49ers lost to the Cowboys again in the 1971 NFC Championship Game, 14–3. Hart had four solo tackles and seven assisted tackles in the championship game.

Hart had a career-high 17 sacks in 1972, second highest of any player in the NFL that season. He intercepted an Archie Manning pass in an early October game against the New Orleans Saints. In a Thanksgiving Day game win over the Dallas Cowboys, 31–10, he sacked quarterback Craig Morton three times. He was a United Press International (UPI) honorable-mention All-NFC that year. He was sixth in the Associated Press' Defensive Player of the Year voting. The 49ers led the NFL in quarterback sacks (46) that season, with a defensive line that included Hart (left defensive end), Hardman (right defensive end), Charlie Krueger (left defensive tackle) and Earl Edwards (right defensive tackle). The 49ers lost to the Cowboys again in the playoffs, this time in the divisional round, 30–28. Hart recovered a fumble in that game.

Hart had 10.5 sacks in 1973, with one fumble recovery; seven sacks and one fumble recovery in 1974; and 7.5 sacks and one fumble recovery in 1975. He was on a defensive line with Hardman and right tackle Bob Hoskins all three seasons. In a mid-November 1975 game against the Chicago Bears, Hardman forced a fumble against quarterback Gary Huff that Hart recovered and returned 10 yards for a touchdown.

Hart was selected to play in the Pro Bowl for the only time in the 1976 season. He had 16 quarterback sacks, third best in the NFL that season. This included six sacks in a single game against 6 ft 3 in (1.91 m) 256 lb (116.1 kg) quarterback James Harris of the Los Angeles Rams, on October 11, in a 16–0 win over the favored Rams. His six sacks forced three Harris fumbles; the 49ers scoring after recovering two of those fumbles. Hart called it the greatest game of his career. He also had one fumble recovery and a safety that season.

Hart finished third in voting for the Associated Press' Defensive Player of the Year in 1976. He was named first-team All-Pro by the Newspaper Enterprise Association, Pro Football Writers of America, and Pro Football Weekly, and second-team All-Pro by the Associated Press. The Associated Press, United Press International, The Sporting News and Pro Football Weekly all selected him first-team All-NFC. The 49ers' defensive line that season, consisting of Hart, Hardman (12.5 sacks), Jimmy Webb (left tackle, 7.5 sacks) and Cleveland Elam (right tackle, 16 sacks), was known as "the Gold Rush". The 49ers led the NFL with 61 quarterback sacks, were second in fewest total yards allowed, and tied for third in fewest points allowed. The unofficial total of 61 sacks, set in a 14-game season, is the most in 49ers history for a season. The official sack high was 60, set in 1985 in a 16-game season, when Hart was a 49ers' defensive line coach.

1977 was Hart's final season with the 49ers. He started all 14 games, but developed knee problems during the year. He had only three sacks, on a 5–9 team. His right knee was surgically repaired after the season ended. During his ten-year 49ers' career, he played in 131 games, starting in 112. He had 72.5 sacks and eight fumble recoveries. It was also reported that during a seven-season period as a starter, he averaged 15 sacks and 76 unassisted tackles a year. In April 1978, the 49ers traded Hart to the Chicago Bears for a second-round draft choice. At the time, Hart believed the 49ers traded him because they did not want to pay the salary he was seeking.

=== Chicago Bears and New Orleans Saints ===
Hart started 16 games at left defensive end for the Bears in 1978, with 7.5 sacks, one safety and one forced fumble. He was second on the team in sacks to future Hall of Fame tackle Alan Page. In 1979, he was a reserve defensive end, appearing in 15 games without any starts. He was replaced at left defensive end by rookie, and future Hall of Fame defensive end, Dan Hampton. Hart finished his playing career with the New Orleans Saints in 1980, after being acquired from the Bears in July. He started 12 games at right defensive end, with three sacks.

Over his 13-year career, he started 140 of 170 games in which he appeared, with 83 quarterback sacks, eight fumble recoveries, two interceptions, two safeties, and two touchdowns.

== Coaching and scouting career ==
In 1979, Hart played under Bears' defensive coordinator Buddy Ryan. Ryan understood that Hart had a wealth of experience, and Hart's rookie replacement Dan Hampton was extremely talented. Ryan asked Hart to teach Hampton everything he could. In working with Hampton, Hart showed his ability to be a good coach.

In 1983, 49ers' future Hall of Fame head coach Bill Walsh hired Hart as an assistant defensive line coach. Walsh liked using recent players as coaches because he believed it helped improve rapport with players and on-field techniques. Walsh also appreciated the experience veteran players like Hart brought to the team. Hart was the 49ers' assistant defensive line coach from 1983 through 1991. The team had a record of 117–41–1 during that time, and Hart was part of three 49ers Super Bowl championship teams (1984, 1988, 1989). As a 49ers' coach, Hart worked with Hall of Fame defensive ends Fred Dean and Charles Haley, among other linemen.

When Haley was a rookie in 1986, everything was new to him, including how to sack quarterbacks in the NFL. He said of Hart, "You have great guys like . . . Tommy Hart around that give you all the insight into that kind of stuff. You know, Tommy Hart is the greatest player. He's just the greatest. He went up and grabbed some old game film. After that, I was a new man". Haley had over 100 sacks in his 13-year career. Hart moved to the 49ers' scouting department in 1992 and worked as a 49ers' scout through 1993.

During the 1983 season, the 49ers had a losing record in home games and were faltering in the standings compared to expectations. They were playing the New Orleans Saints in San Francisco, with both teams having a 6–4 record. To the surprise of everyone on the team, Hart, typically a person of few words, gave the team an inspirational talk; helping to contribute to the 49ers' 27–0 victory over the Saints. Although he reportedly did not hear Hart's inspirational talk to the team, Fred Dean had six sacks in that game to tie Hart's 49ers' record set in 1976 against the Rams and James Harris. In 1985, the 49ers' defensive line that Hart coached helped the team collect 60 sacks, the second highest total in team history behind the 1976 team's unofficial 61 sacks.

In 1996, Hart joined the Dallas Cowboys as the defensive ends or defensive line coach. In 1998, he was hired by the Cowboys as the team's West area scout, and worked in that role through 2005.

== Legacy and honors ==
In 1972 and 1976, Hart's 49ers' teammates honored him by voting him the recipient of the Len Eshmont Award, the 49ers most prestigious annual honor, that goes to the player best exemplifying "the inspirational and courageous play of Len Eshmont". When receiving the 1972 award, Hart tearfully said "I've experienced some wonderful things in my life . . . but this has to be the biggest. It means a lot when your teammates are the ones voting for the award". Robert Slocum, Hart's high school football coach, presented Hart with the 1972 award. Slocum said of Hart "Tommy is someone I'll always remember because he demonstrated character, determination and self-confidence, three ingredients that remain with him today. He learned early to stay with a job and not let up even if it meant blood, sweat and tears". After Hart's 1972 season, 49ers defensive coach Paul Wiggin said he would not trade Hart for any other defensive end, because he knew "how much desire Tommy has".

Before being selected to the Pro Bowl for the first and only time in 1976, his ninth year in the NFL, Hart observed that he was not a flamboyant player, and was overlooked during his career for this kind of accolade. Hart's official obituary noted that he was a man of few words, who lived by the motto "you learn more by listening than you do talking", and the principle "just do your job".

In 1993, Hart was inducted into the Georgia Sports Hall of Fame. In 2001, he was inducted into the Macon Sports Hall of Fame. He was inducted into the Multi-Ethnic Sports Hall of Fame in 2015, and the Georgia High School Hall of Fame in 2024.

== Personal life and death ==
In August 1966, while still in college, Hart was drafted by the United States Army during the Vietnam War, and reportedly was in military service for part of 1968 in the United States during his first NFL season. It was also reported that due to right knee problems, he was not drafted or did not see military action. While playing for the 49ers, Hart lived in Redwood City, California during the off seasons, where he worked with city youth in recreation programs. He also was employed by a city-county agency to work with juvenile criminal offenders. Hart worked on a two-person team in eight-hour shifts, and was assigned to the maximum security cottage with the most serious offenders.

After becoming successful in the NFL, Hart had a nine-room split level home built for his family, on a plot of land near their existing home in Georgia. Early in his career, Hart took advice from 49ers teammate Charlie Krueger to start planning for life financially after his football career ended. While still playing in the NFL, Hart bought a cattle ranch in Georgia as a tax shelter, and made real estate investments. Hart also opened Tom Hart Sports, a sporting goods store in California; from which he would also provide football shoes to those in need.

Hart died on November 20, 2024. He was survived by Cherrie Hart, his wife of 56 years; along with four daughters and six grandchildren.
