= Cedrick Hardman =

American football player (1948–2019)

- Hardman in 2003

No. 86
- Position: Defensive end

Personal information
- Born: October 4, 1948; Houston, Texas, U.S.
- Died: March 8, 2019 (aged 70); San Clemente, California, U.S.
- Listed height: 6 ft 3 in (1.91 m)
- Listed weight: 255 lb (116 kg)

Career information
- High school: George Washington Carver (Houston)
- College: North Texas State (1965–1966, 1968–1969)
- NFL draft: 1970: 1st round, 9th overall pick

Career history
- San Francisco 49ers (1970–1979); Oakland Raiders (1980–1981); Oakland Invaders (1983)

Awards and highlights
- Super Bowl champion (XV); 2× Second-team All-Pro (1971, 1975); 2× Pro Bowl (1971, 1975); NFL sacks leader (1971); First-team All-MVC (1969)

Career NFL statistics
- Sacks: 122.5
- Safeties: 1
- Fumble recoveries: 9
- Defensive touchdowns: 1
- Stats at Pro Football Reference

Cedrick Ward Hardman (October 4, 1948 – March 8, 2019) was an American professional football defensive end who played in the National Football League (NFL) for the San Francisco 49ers and the Oakland Raiders, then played in the United States Football League (USFL) for the Oakland Invaders. He was a 49ers' first round draft pick in 1970 and became part of the 49ers "Gold Rush" defensive line. He was on the Raiders' Super Bowl XV winning team, after leading the Raiders in sacks in 1980. Hardman's thirteen-year football career lasted from 1970 to 1981 in the NFL and ended as a player-coach in 1983 with the Invaders.

Hardman was the first player known in NFL history to record at least eight sacks in a season for the first seven seasons of their career, and had eight or more sacks in his first nine seasons. He had 10.5 or more sacks in six seasons with the 49ers, including a stretch of five consecutive seasons with at least 10.5 sacks. Hardman held the record for most sacks in a season for the 49ers for over 40 years, recording 18 sacks in 14 games during the 1971 season with the 49ers, until 2012, when it was broken by Aldon Smith with 19.5. Hardman had another 4.5 sacks in the 1971–72 NFL playoffs, and had two 3.5 sack playoff games in his career.

Hardman played college football at North Texas State University (now the University of North Texas). He became a defensive end during his final two seasons at North Texas State. As a senior in 1969, he had seven sacks in a single game against the University of Tulsa, was named All-Missouri Valley Conference, and played in the Blue Gray Game (where he was named defensive lineman of the game) and the Senior Bowl (where he had two critical sacks in the game).

== Early life ==
Hardman was born on October 4, 1948, in Houston to Frank and Ossie Lee Hardman. He was one of four children. It is reported that he attended Garden City Elementary school, beginning his schooling in second grade, at the age of five; or that he attended first grade and was promoted directly to third grade. He attended George Washington Carver High School in Houston. He only played one year of high school football because he was younger and smaller than his peers, and focused more on being a basketball player in high school. In 1970, he said that he had played offensive end as a high school senior, but years later also stated that he did not play football in high school because he was too small at that time. He graduated fourth in his class, at 16-years old.

== College career ==
Hardman attended North Texas State University, (renamed the University of North Texas in 1988), on an academic (engineering) scholarship. He was not quite 17-years olds when he entered North Texas. He played on the school's college football team in the Missouri Valley Conference. He was 5 ft 11 in (1.8 m) 175 lb (79.4 kg) when he entered North Texas State in 1965. Hardman was originally a defensive back or running back at North Texas in 1965, and played as a reserve and/or starting defensive back in 1966. He was scholastically ineligible to play football in 1967.

On returning to the team in 1968, Hardman had grown to 6 ft 3 in (1.91 m) 240 lb (108.9 kg). Head coach Rod Rust tried Hardman at different positions, finally concluding defensive end was Hardman's best position; and Hardman played his junior season (1968) at defensive end. He did not begin the year as a starter, but was one of the most feared defensive ends in the Missouri Valley Conference by the end of that season. In 1968, he started only two or three games, playing alongside future Hall of Fame defensive tackle Joe Greene, later describing this time-period as whetting his appetite for sacking quarterbacks.

By his senior year (1969), Hardman reportedly was 6 ft 3 in 255 lb (116 kg), 240 lb, or 260 lb (117.9 kg). Hardman did not bulk up by lifting weights, but believed he was just continuing to grow during his college years. The summer before his senior season, Hardman studied films of NFL defensive ends, such as Hall of Fame end Deacon Jones to better learn how to play the position. Hardman stated in 1984 that he had over 30 quarterback sacks his senior year at North Texas. Decades after his time playing at North Texas, it has been reported that he had: 38 quarterback sacks in only 10 games that year; 30 sacks during his 1969 regular season games played for North Texas and eight additional sacks in post-season college all-star games; and 38 sacks over his two seasons at defensive end.

During his senior year (1969), it was reported on November 16, 1969 that in a November 15, 1969 game against the University of Tulsa, Hardman had nine solo tackles, three assisted tackles, seven quarterback sacks, two forced fumbles against Tulsa quarterback Rick Arrington that led to two North Texas scoring drives, and an interception against Arrington that Hardman returned for a touchdown. The interception came when Hardman hit Arrington, a future NFL quarterback, while he was trying to pass. The ball popped in the air, Hardman caught it and went two yards for the touchdown. North Texas won the game 42–16. (Decades later, other sources stated Hardman had an 11-sack game against the University of Tulsa in 1969.) Coach Rust stated that Hardman's performance against the Missouri Valley Conference champion Memphis Tigers earlier that year was the best game by a defensive end he had ever seen.

In 1969, the Associated Press named Hardman first-team All-Missouri Valley Conference at defensive end. Hardman was also selected to play in the Blue-Gray Game and the Senior Bowl after his senior season at North Texas. He was voted the South's best defensive lineman in the Blue-Gray Game. It has been reported that while Hardman had an excellent performance rushing the passer and recovering a fumble in the Blue-Gray Game, Troy State's George Little was named the outstanding defensive player of the game. In the Senior Bowl, Hardman had two critical sacks of North quarterback Dennis Shaw that stopped touchdown drives. He is reported to have run the 40-yard dash in 4.6 seconds while being scouted at the Senior Bowl. It has been stated that Hardman earned defensive most valuable player honors in both of these college all-star games after recording four sacks in each game. Hardman was also selected to play in the Coaches All-America Game in June 1970, held in Lubbock Texas, and in the Chicago Charities College All-Star Game against the Kansas City Chiefs in July 1970.

Hardman was given the nickname "Nasty" in college, which carried over into his NFL career.

== Professional career ==
=== NFL career ===
==== San Francisco 49ers ====
Hardman was selected with the ninth overall selection in the first round of the 1970 NFL draft by the San Francisco 49ers. He started five games at right defensive end in 1970 as a rookie, with Bill Belk starting the other nine games at right defensive end. Left defensive end Tommy Hart started every 49ers game from 1970 to 1977. 49ers coach Dick Nolan used Hardman as part of a defensive line rotation with Belk. Nolan put Hardman into games on third downs as a pass rushing specialist, in circumstances when it was most likely the offense would be passing rather than rushing.

Hardman started the first game of his rookie season at right defensive end, on September 20, 1970, against the Washington Redskins. He sacked future Hall of Fame quarterback Sonny Jurgensen, and knocked down one of Jurgensen's passes. That season, as a rookie who started less than half of the team's games, Hardman led the 49ers with 8.5 quarterback sacks. The 49ers had a 10–3–1 record, and came in first place in the NFC West Division. The 49ers defeated the Minnesota Vikings in the divisional round of the playoffs, 17–14. Hardman did not start that game, but had two sacks. The 49ers then lost in the NFC Championship game to the Dallas Cowboys, 17–10.

In 1971, Hardman started 13 of 14 games in which he appeared, and had a career high 18 sacks. He led the NFL in sacks that season, 4.5 sacks ahead of second place Jethro Pugh. His 18 sacks set the 49ers single season record, standing for over 40 years. This record was later surpassed in a 16-game season by Aldon Smith with 19.5 sacks in 2012 (though Smith set the record in the 13th game of that season), and by Nick Bosa with 18.5 sacks in 2022 (in which Bosa played 16 games). Hardman was selected to play in the Pro Bowl. He was named second-team All-Pro by the Pro Football Writers of America, and second-team All-Conference by United Press International (UPI).

The 49ers again won the NFC West Division, and defeated the Washington Redskins, 24–20 in the divisional round of the 1971–72 playoffs. Hardman started that game, and had one sack. He also tackled Redskins receiver Roy Jefferson on an end-around play for a 13-yard loss; a play which had been suggested to Washington coach George Allen by President Richard Nixon. The 49ers again lost in the NFC Championship game to the Dallas Cowboys, 14–3. Hardman started that game and had 3.5 sacks. In his 16 49ers' games played that season overall, Hardman had 22.5 sacks.

Hardman started 12 of the 14 games in which he appeared in 1972, with nine sacks and one fumble recovery. The 49ers again won the NFC West Division. They lost 30–28 in the 1972 divisional round against the Dallas Cowboys. Hardman had 3.5 sacks in that game, and forced an interception as he was pressuring Cowboys' quarterback Craig Morton. In 1973, Hardman started 12 of the 14 games in which he appeared with eight quarterback sacks, two fumble recoveries and a safety. Hardman started all 14 games in 1974, leading the 49ers with 10.5 sacks and recovering two fumbles.

Hardman led the 49ers with 14.5 sacks in 1975, fourth best in the NFL. He was selected to the Pro Bowl for the second time. The Newspaper Enterprise Association named him second-team All-Pro. The Sporting News named him first-team All-Conference and UPI named him second-team All-Conference. In an October 1975 game against the New Orleans Saints, Hardman blocked a punt that ultimately led to a 49ers' touchdown.

Hardman had 12.5 sacks in 1976, playing in only 11 games. The 49ers' defensive line that season, consisting of Hardman, Tommy Hart (16 sacks) Jimmy Webb (left tackle, 7.5 sacks) and Cleveland Elam (right tackle, 16 sacks), was known as "the Gold Rush". Hardman played under defensive line coach Floyd Peters in 1976 and 1977, whom Hardman held in high regard as a coach. The 49ers led the NFL with 61 quarterback sacks, were second in fewest total yards allowed, and tied for third in fewest points allowed. The unofficial total of 61 sacks, set in a 14-game season, is the most in 49ers history for a season. The official 49ers sack high was 60, set in 1985 in a 16-game season.

In 1977, Hardman started all 14 games, with 12.5 sacks and one fumble recovery. He had 3.5 sacks in an early November game against the Atlanta Falcons. He started all 16 games in 1978, with 11.5 sacks, two forced fumbles and one fumble recovery. In 1979, his last year in San Francisco, he started 11 games, with three sacks and one forced fumble. He suffered from a pinched nerve and broken thumb that season, affecting his play and causing him to miss time as a starter after breaking his thumb.

Bill Walsh became the 49ers head coach in 1979, with Chuck Studley as defensive coordinator. Hardman believed Walsh and Studley had lost confidence in him that season, and that Studley in particular had a negative attitude about Hardman. Hardman later observed that the 49ers went to a 3–4 defense, for which he was not well-suited. In May 1980, after having played the entire decade of the 1970s in San Francisco, the 49ers traded Hardman to the Oakland Raiders for future draft choices. Walsh said at the time "Cedrick has been a great performer for the 49ers" but the team needed "to take a long range approach in developing our young defensive line".

Hardman remains the current all-time sack leader for the San Francisco 49ers franchise. Sacks did not become an official statistic in the NFL until 1982. In 139 games with the 49ers, he is reported as recording, unofficially, 107 sacks between 1970 and 1979 with the 49ers, or 108 sacks with the 49ers, or 112.5 sacks with the 49ers. He had over 10 sacks in six of his 10 seasons with the 49ers, including five consecutive seasons from 1974 to 1978. He additionally totaled 10 sacks in five playoff games with the 49ers, including his two 3.5 sack games.

Hardman had a flashy style with the 49ers. He had his nickname "Nasty" on the license plate of his red Lincoln Continental, and was known for a flamboyant wardrobe.

==== Oakland Raiders ====
Hardman's career was rejuvenated with Oakland in 1980. He did not start any of the 16 games in which he appeared for the Raiders, but he led the Raiders with 9.5 sacks. He also had two forced fumbles and one fumble recovery. He was used as a pass rush specialist, who replaced right defensive end Dave Browning on likely passing plays. He was a member of the Raiders' Super Bowl XV championship team. He sacked future Hall of Fame quarterback Dan Fouts in the 1980 AFC Championship victory over the San Diego Chargers.

In 1981, Hardman again played in 16 games for the Raiders, without starting any. He had five quarterback sacks, one forced fumble and one fumble recovery. In a September 14, 1981 Monday Night Football game against the Minnesota Vikings, Hardman recovered a fumble after teammate Howie Long hit quarterback Wade Wilson, and returned it 52 yards for the only touchdown of his career. The Raiders waived Hardman in August 1982.

Hardman had 14.5 unofficial sacks with the Oakland Raiders in 1980 (9.5) and 1981 (five). Unofficially, through the 2019 season, Hardman's 121.5 career sacks ranked him tied with Clyde Simmons for 30th all time. He has also been reported as having 122.5 regular season career sacks by Pro Football Reference, ranking him 31st among all players since 1960 (through the 2025 season).

=== USFL career ===
On October 20, 1982, Hardman was the first player signed by the Oakland Invaders of newly formed United States Football League. Hardman served as a player-coach during the team's inaugural 1983 season, as the Invaders won their division with a 9-9 record.

== Legacy and honors ==
In 2001, he was inducted into the University of North Texas Athletics Hall of Fame, and in 2006 was selected to the Missouri Valley Conference All-Centennial Team. In 2013, he was selected to the North Texas All-Century Team. The NFL Network included Hardman on a 49ers All-Time Team.

At the time of his death in March 2019, the 49ers issued a statement saying "During his 10-year career in red and gold, he anchored the vaunted 'Gold Rush' defensive line with a nonstop motor that put fear in the minds of opposing quarterbacks". Through the 2022 season, he was one of only seven players known to have at least eight sacks in each of their first seven seasons (along with Al Baker, Aaron Donald, Yannick Ngakoue, Derrick Thomas, DeMarcus Ware and Reggie White). Hardman was the first among those players to record at least eight sacks in a season for the first seven seasons of their career. He had eight or more sacks over his first nine seasons. He was also reported as having at least 12 sacks per year in his first nine years with the 49ers.

== Acting career ==
After retiring from football, Hardman worked as an actor, appearing in both films and television shows.

=== Movies ===
- House Party (1990) – Rock
- Stir Crazy (1980) – Big Mean
- The Candidate (1972) – Actor

=== Television ===
- The Fall Guy: "Pilot" (1981) – Righteous (2 episodes)
- Police Woman: "The Company" (1975, credited as Cedrick Hardman) – Large Man
- Criminal Minds: "Blood Relations" (2014) – Hand double

== Personal life and death ==
After retiring, in 1984, he moved from Menlo Park, California to Laguna Beach, California to work for Rockshire Records in Anaheim, California. Rockshire Records went out of business, and that same year Hardman took a job as a defensive line coach at Laguna Beach High School, in Orange County, California. He became the school's head football coach in 1985.

In September 1986, he was arrested for cocaine possession while driving, and resisting arrest; resulting in suspension as head coach. Hardman was ordered to enter a drug diversion program, and some charges against him were dismissed. While not condoning his conduct, a majority of the school board voted to permit Hardman to finish out the 1986 season as a volunteer assistant to the team's coaches, but without pay during his final three games; believing this would help his rehabilitation. They also voted that he could be reinstated in 1987 if he completed the drug diversion program, and met a number of other conditions. The decision to allow Hardman to finish the season and possibly return as coach was divisive in the community, and resulted in three board members later being removed in a special election. Hardman resigned in early 1987 and did not return to coach that year, stating he intended to pursue completion of his college education. In June 1987, he pleaded no contest to the resisting arrest charge and was sentenced to 10 days in the Orange County jail.

In 1990, Hardman was a volunteer football coach at California State University, Long Beach, under Pro Football Hall of Fame head coach George Allen. Allen selected Hardman among 200 applicants, both because of his experience playing against Hardman in the NFL and because Allen believed Hardman was a good person who needed an opportunity to overcome the stigma of his 1986 arrest. By that time, Hardman had given up the flamboyant style of his younger playing days, and sought anonymity. In 2003, he volunteered to assist in the Baltimore Ravens' training camp.

Hardman helped organize Sack Masters, Inc., an organization for professional football players with 100 or more quarterback sacks. Hardman was related to Jonathan Marshall, who played four games in the NFL for the New York Jets in 2021 (with one sack), and during 2022–23 was on the practice squads of the Jets and the Pittsburgh Steelers.

Hardman was one of the NFL players participating in a lawsuit against the NFL alleging injuries suffered from concussions incurred while playing in the NFL. In his complaint against the NFL Hardman alleged that he "suffered repeated and chronic head impacts during his career in the NFL and is at an increased risk of latent brain disease. As a result, Hardman has experienced cognitive and other difficulties including, but not limited to, loss of memory, neck and cervical arthritis and associated numbness/tingling". Before his death, Hardman left instructions that his brain be donated to the Brain Bank at Boston University to determine whether he had chronic traumatic encephalopathy (CTE). Hardman died from pancreatic cancer on March 8, 2019, in San Clemente, California.
