= Dale Mitchell (American football) =

American football player (born 1953)

No. 64
- Position: Linebacker

Personal information
- Born: September 1, 1953 (age 73); Oceanside, California, U.S.
- Listed height: 6 ft 3 in (1.91 m)
- Listed weight: 223 lb (101 kg)

Career information
- High school: Carlsbad (Carlsbad, California)
- College: USC
- NFL draft: 1975: 13th round, 322nd overall pick

Career history
- San Francisco 49ers (1975–1977)
- Stats at Pro Football Reference

Dale James Mitchell (born September 1, 1953) is an American former professional football linebacker who played for the San Francisco 49ers of the National Football League (NFL). He played college football for the USC Trojans and was selected by the 49ers in the 13th round of the 1975 NFL draft.

== Early life ==
Dale James Mitchell was born on September 1, 1953, in Oceanside, California. He attended Carlsbad High School in Carlsbad, California.

== College career ==
Mitchell enrolled at the University of Southern California to play college football for the Trojans. He was on the freshman team in 1971 and was a three-year varsity letterman from 1972 to 1974.

== Professional career ==
Mitchell was selected by the San Francisco 49ers in the 13th round, with the 322nd overall pick, of the 1975 NFL draft. As a rookie during training camp, Mitchell had to wear a bucket on his head in the cafeteria and sing Dang Me by Roger Miller. This was traditional rookie hazing during the time period. Mitchell missed the entire 1975 season due to injury. He played in 13 games in 1976 as a reserve linebacker. He appeared in four games in 1977 before being placed on injured reserve on October 12, 1977. Mitchell became a free agent after the 1977 season and was not re-signed.
