= Delvin Williams =

American football player (born 1951)

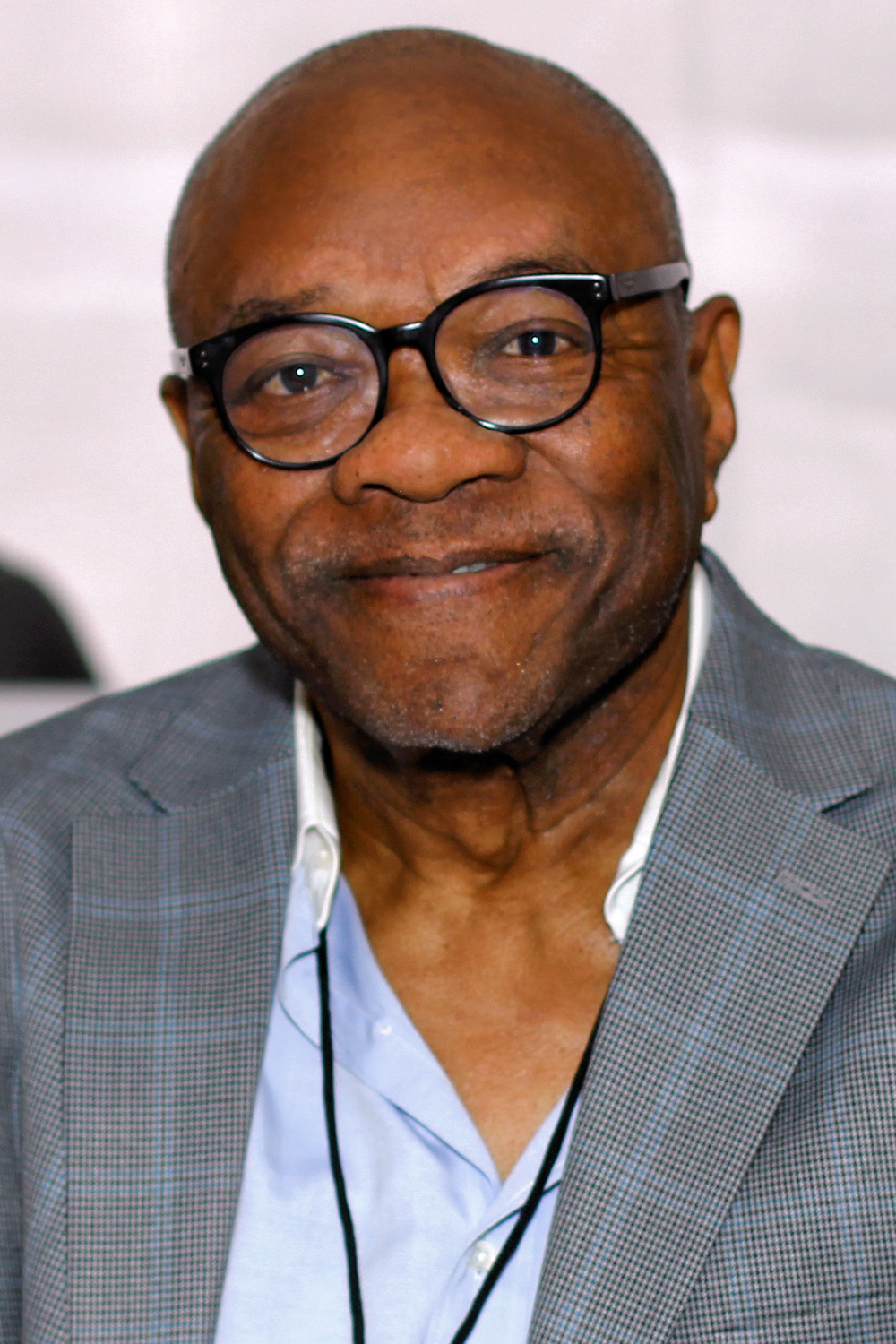
- Williams in 2023

No. 24, 20
- Position: Running back

Personal information
- Born: April 17, 1951 (age 75); Houston, Texas, U.S.
- Listed height: 6 ft 0 in (1.83 m)
- Listed weight: 195 lb (88 kg)

Career information
- High school: Kashmere (Houston)
- College: Kansas
- NFL draft: 1974: 2nd round, 49th overall pick

Career history
- San Francisco 49ers (1974–1977); Miami Dolphins (1978–1980); Green Bay Packers (1981)

Awards and highlights
- First-team All-Pro (1978); 2× Pro Bowl (1976, 1978)

Career NFL statistics
- Rushing yards: 5,598
- Average: 4.3
- Rushing TDs: 33
- Stats at Pro Football Reference

Delvin Williams Jr. (born April 17, 1951), is an American former professional football player who was a running back in the National Football League (NFL). He was selected by the San Francisco 49ers in the second round of the 1974 NFL draft. A 6'0", 197-lb. running back from the University of Kansas, Williams played for the 49ers, Miami Dolphins, and Green Bay Packers in eight NFL seasons from 1974 to 1981. A two-time Pro Bowl selection in 1976 and 1978, Williams rushed for over 1,200 yards in both those seasons.

== NFL career statistics ==
Legend
| | Led the league |
| **Bold** | Career high |

=== Regular season ===
| Year | Team | Games | | Rushing | | | | | Receiving | | | | |
| Year | Team | GP | GS | Att | Yds | Avg | Lng | TD | Rec | Yds | Avg | Lng | TD |
|---|---|---|---|---|---|---|---|---|---|---|---|---|---|
| 1974 | SFO | 13 | 0 | 36 | 201 | **5.6** | 71 | 3 | 1 | 9 | 9.0 | 9 | 0 |
| 1975 | SFO | 14 | 12 | 117 | 631 | 5.4 | 52 | 3 | **34** | **370** | **10.9** | 30 | 1 |
| 1976 | SFO | 13 | 13 | 248 | 1,203 | 4.9 | **80** | 7 | 27 | 283 | 10.5 | **85** | **2** |
| 1977 | SFO | 14 | 14 | 268 | 931 | 3.5 | 40 | 7 | 20 | 179 | 9.0 | 17 | **2** |
| 1978 | MIA | 16 | 15 | **272** | **1,258** | 4.6 | 58 | **8** | 18 | 192 | 10.7 | 42 | 0 |
| 1979 | MIA | 14 | 13 | 184 | 703 | 3.8 | 39 | 3 | 21 | 175 | 8.3 | 38 | 1 |
| 1980 | MIA | 15 | 10 | 187 | 671 | 3.6 | 65 | 2 | 31 | 207 | 6.7 | 19 | 0 |
| 1981 | GNB | 1 | 0 | 0 | 0 | 0.0 | 0 | 0 | 0 | 0 | 0.0 | 0 | 0 |
| | | 100 | 77 | 1,312 | 5,598 | 4.3 | 80 | 33 | 152 | 1,415 | 9.3 | 85 | 6 |

=== Playoffs ===
| Year | Team | Games | | Rushing | | | | | Receiving | | | | |
| Year | Team | GP | GS | Att | Yds | Avg | Lng | TD | Rec | Yds | Avg | Lng | TD |
|---|---|---|---|---|---|---|---|---|---|---|---|---|---|
| 1978 | MIA | 1 | 1 | **13** | **41** | **3.2** | **9** | 0 | 1 | 8 | **8.0** | **8** | 0 |
| 1979 | MIA | 1 | 1 | 8 | 1 | 0.1 | 3 | 0 | **6** | **26** | 4.3 | 6 | 0 |
| | | 2 | 2 | 21 | 42 | 2.0 | 9 | 0 | 7 | 34 | 4.9 | 8 | 0 |

== Work with Nancy Reagan ==
Shortly after retiring, Williams began a years-long collaboration with Nancy Reagan on her signature project to prevent teens from doing drugs called "Just Say No". Williams focused on providing advice to youth on preventing drug use. In this capacity, he made many presentations with Mrs. Reagan.

== Post-football career ==
On March 10, 2015, Williams launched a global internet sports radio show, LIFE AFTER FOOTBALL on MJWJ Global Radio Network. The one-hour talk show airs every Tuesday at 7:00 PM/CST, broadcasting live from Houston, Texas. It will explore a wide range of topics related to football focused on the athlete often unprepared for life after the sport. LIFE AFTER FOOTBALL will tackle a new topic each week and provide an open format for retired football players to voice opinions. The program offers a unique approach and perspective from a retired players point of view.
