= Bob Simpson (American football) =

American football player (born 1954)

No. 70
- Position: Defensive end

Personal information
- Born: March 29, 1954 (age 72); Bloomington, Illinois, U.S.
- Listed height: 6 ft 5 in (1.96 m)
- Listed weight: 235 lb (107 kg)

Career information
- High school: Arapahoe (Centennial, Colorado)
- College: Colorado
- NFL draft: 1976: 8th round, 230th overall pick

Career history
- Miami Dolphins (1978)

Career NFL statistics
- Sacks: 1
- Stats at Pro Football Reference

Robert Morris Simpson (born March 29, 1954) is an American former professional football player who was a defensive end in the National Football League (NFL) with the Miami Dolphins for five games in 1978. He played college football for the Colorado Buffaloes.

== Professional career ==
Simpson was selected by the Miami Dolphins in the eighth round (230th overall) of the 1976 NFL draft out of the University of Colorado Boulder before being released in training camp. He was resigned by the team in the offseason before the 1978 season started.
