= Sean Clancy (American football) =

American football player (born 1956)

No. 57, 52
- Position: Linebacker

Personal information
- Born: October 22, 1956 (age 70); Manhasset, New York, U.S.
- Listed height: 6 ft 4 in (1.93 m)
- Listed weight: 218 lb (99 kg)

Career information
- High school: Chaminade (Mineola, New York)
- College: Amherst
- NFL draft: 1978: 8th round, 217th overall pick

Career history
- Miami Dolphins (1978); St. Louis Cardinals (1979)

Career NFL statistics
- Fumble recoveries: 1
- Stats at Pro Football Reference

Sean Matthew Clancy (born October 22, 1956) is an American former professional football player who was a linebackerfor two seasons in the National Football League (NFL) with the Miami Dolphins and St. Louis Cardinals from 1978 to 1979. He played college football for the Amherst Mammoths.

== Career ==
Clancy was selected by the Miami Dolphins in the 8th round of the 1978 NFL draft out of Amherst College. Clancy would go on to appear in 26 career games for the Dolphins and St. Louis Cardinals.
