= Melvin Mitchell =

American football player (born 1953)

No. 68, 64, 60
- Positions: Guard, center, tackle

Personal information
- Born: February 21, 1953 (age 73); Dallas, Texas, U.S.
- Listed height: 6 ft 3 in (1.91 m)
- Listed weight: 260 lb (118 kg)

Career information
- High school: Lincoln (Dallas)
- College: Tennessee State
- NFL draft: 1976: 4th round, 98th overall pick

Career history
- Miami Dolphins (1976–1977); Detroit Lions (1977); Miami Dolphins (1978); Minnesota Vikings (1980)

Career NFL statistics
- Games played: 34
- Fumble recoveries: 1
- Stats at Pro Football Reference

Melvin Mitchell (born February 21, 1953) is an American former professional football player who was an offensive lineman for four seasons in the National Football League (NFL).

Mitchell was born and raised in Dallas, Texas and attended Tennessee State University. As a senior he was named to the Pittsburgh Courier's 51st Annual Black All-American Team.

He was selected 98th overall by the Miami Dolphins in the fourth round of the 1976 NFL draft.
