= Loaird McCreary =

American football player (born 1953)

No. 80, 89, 82
- Position: Tight end

Personal information
- Born: March 15, 1953 (age 73); Crawfordville, Georgia, U.S.
- Listed height: 6 ft 5 in (1.96 m)
- Listed weight: 227 lb (103 kg)

Career information
- High school: George (Atlanta, Georgia)
- College: Tennessee State (1972–1975)
- NFL draft: 1976: 2nd round, 49th overall pick

Career history
- Miami Dolphins (1976–1978); New York Giants (1979); Baltimore Colts (1981)*; Oklahoma Outlaws (1984)
- * Offseason or practice squad member only

Career NFL statistics
- Receptions: 8
- Receiving yards: 95
- Receiving touchdowns: 3
- Stats at Pro Football Reference

Loaird Arthur McCreary (born March 15, 1953) is an American former professional football player who was a tight end for four seasons in the National Football League (NFL) with the Miami Dolphins and New York Giants. He was selected by the Dolphins in the second round of the 1976 NFL draft after playing college football for the Tennessee State Tigers.

== Early life and college ==
Loaird Arthur McCreary was born on March 15, 1953, in Crawfordville, Georgia. He attended Walter F. George High School in Atlanta, Georgia.

McCreary was a four-year letterman for the Tennessee State Tigers of Tennessee State University from 1972 to 1975.

== Professional career ==
McCreary was selected by the Miami Dolphins in the second round, with the 49th overall pick, of the 1976 NFL draft. He played in all 14 games for the Dolphins during his rookie year in 1976 and caught two passes for 51 yards. He appeared in all 14 games for the second consecutive season, starting four, in 1977, recording two receptions for ten yards and one touchdown, and one kick return for 30 yards. McCreary played in all 16 games, starting one, during the 1978 season and caught three passes for 27 yards and two touchdowns. He also appeared in one playoff game that year. He was released by the Dolphins on August 21, 1979.

McCreary signed with the New York Giants on October 2, 1979. He played in 11 games in 1979, totaling one catch for seven yards. He was released by the Giants on August 16, 1980.

McCreary was signed by the Baltimore Colts on April 21, 1981. He was waived on September 1, 1981.

McCreary was a member of the Oklahoma Outlaws of the United States Football League (USFL) in 1984. He was released on March 5, 1984, after the second game of the 1984 USFL season.
