= Cleveland Elam =

American football player (1952–2012)

No. 72
- Positions: Defensive tackle Defensive end

Personal information
- Born: April 5, 1952; Memphis, Tennessee, U.S.
- Died: July 12, 2012 (aged 60); Salisbury, North Carolina, U.S.
- Listed height: 6 ft 4 in (1.93 m)
- Listed weight: 252 lb (114 kg)

Career information
- College: Tennessee State
- NFL draft: 1975: 4th round, 85th overall pick

Career history
- San Francisco 49ers (1975–1978); Detroit Lions (1979)

Awards and highlights
- First-team All-Pro (1977); 2× Pro Bowl (1976, 1977)

Career NFL statistics
- Sacks: 34.5
- Fumble recoveries: 4
- Defensive TDs: 1
- Stats at Pro Football Reference

Cleveland Elam (April 5, 1952 – July 12, 2012) was an American professional football defensive tackle who played in the National Football League (NFL) for the San Francisco 49ers and Detroit Lions in an injury-shortened five-year career that lasted from 1975 to 1979.

Teaming with Cedric Hardman, Jimmy Webb and Tommy Hart, the 49ers Gold Rush defensive line led the NFL in sacks during the 1976 season. Elam had 14.5 sacks in 1976 and led the team with 17.5 sacks in 1977.

Elam played college football at Tennessee State University and was drafted in the fourth round of the 1975 NFL draft by the 49ers. He was a two time Pro Bowler in 1976 and 1977.

Elam was married to his wife Blanche and had four children. He died on July 12, 2012.
