= List of Atlanta Falcons starting quarterbacks =

These quarterbacks have started at least one game for the Atlanta Falcons of the National Football League (NFL). They are listed in order of the date of each playing at quarterback for the Falcons.

Bob Berry (1968–1972)

== Starting quarterbacks ==
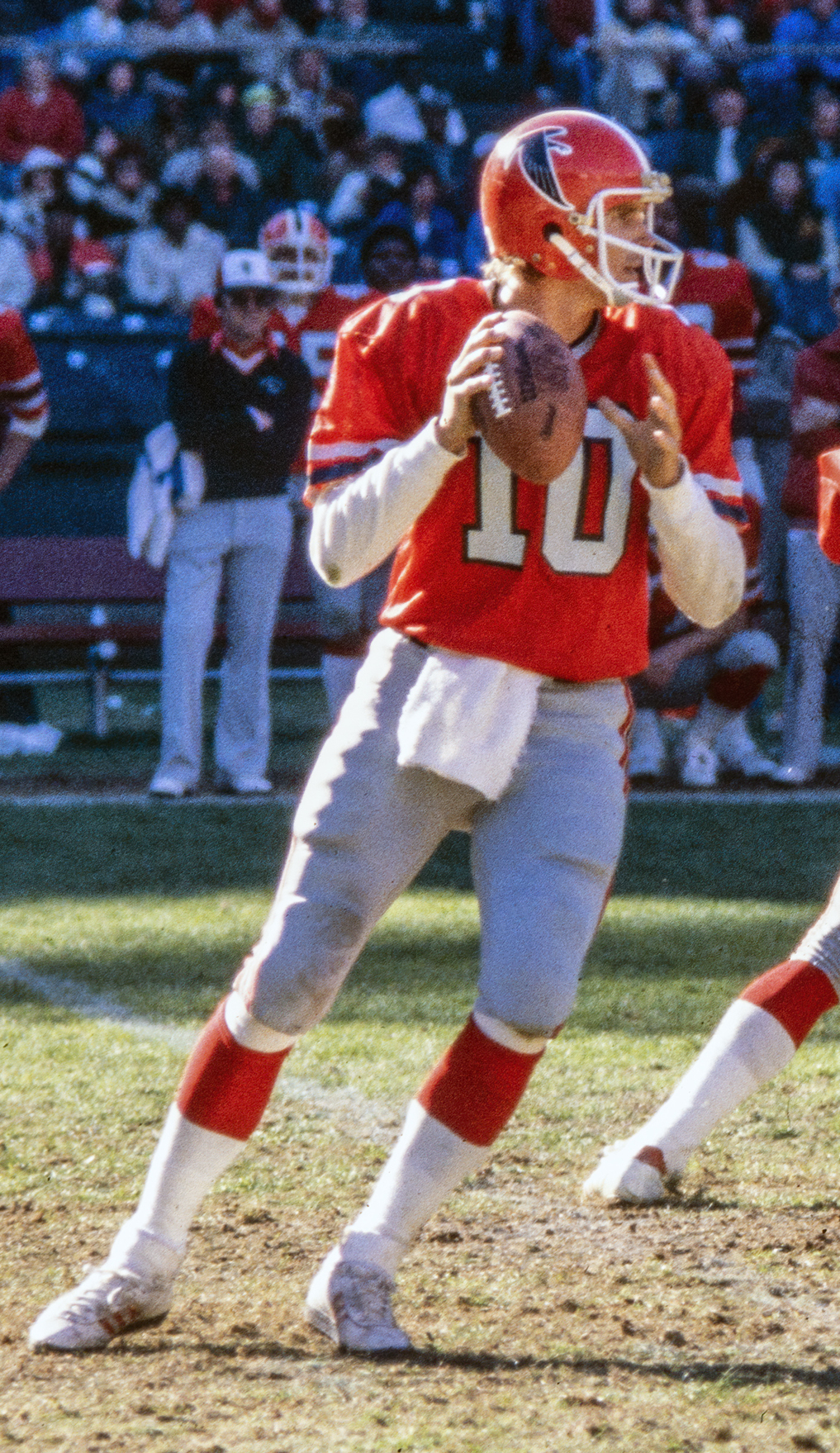
Steve Bartkowski (1975–1985)

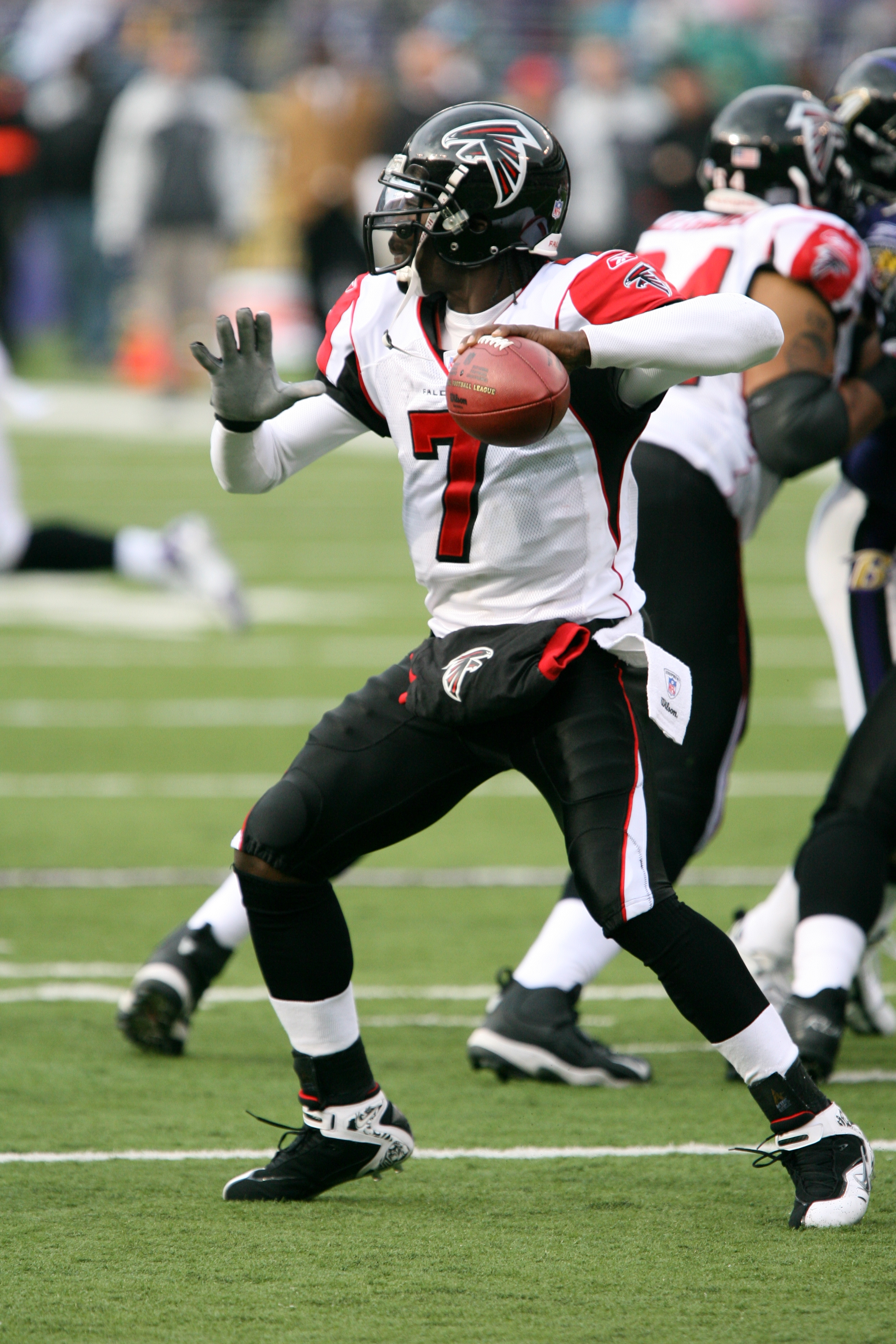
Michael Vick (2001–2006)

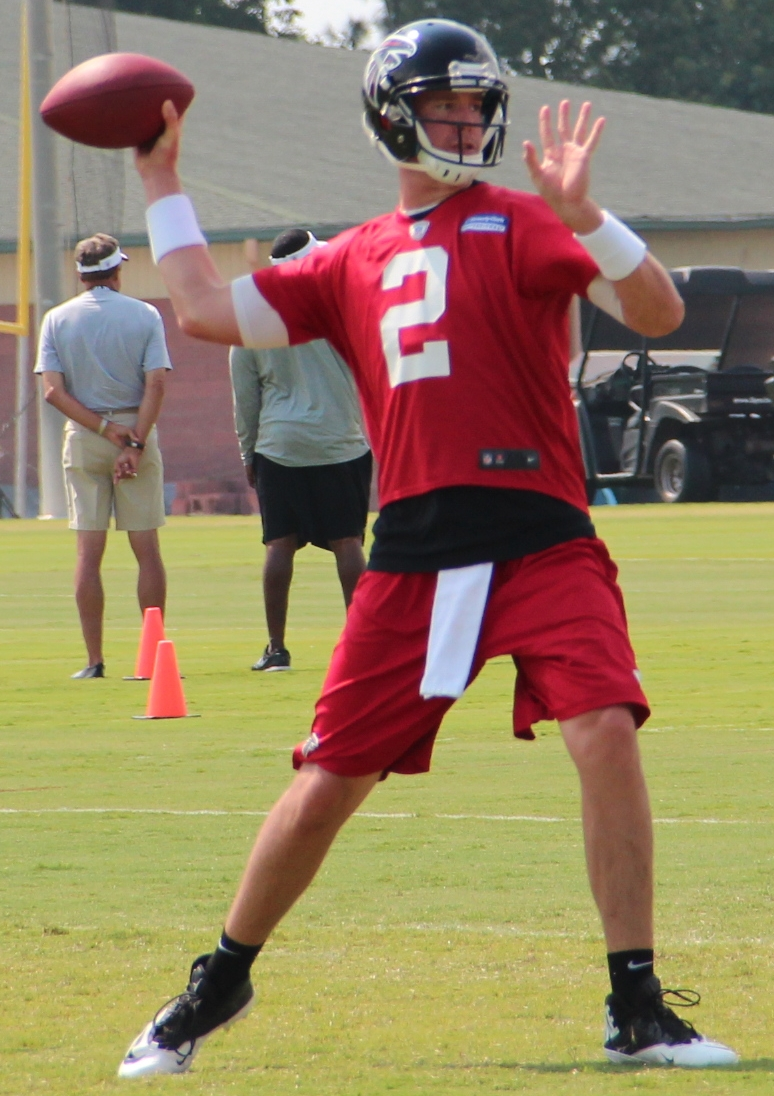
Matt Ryan (2008–2021)

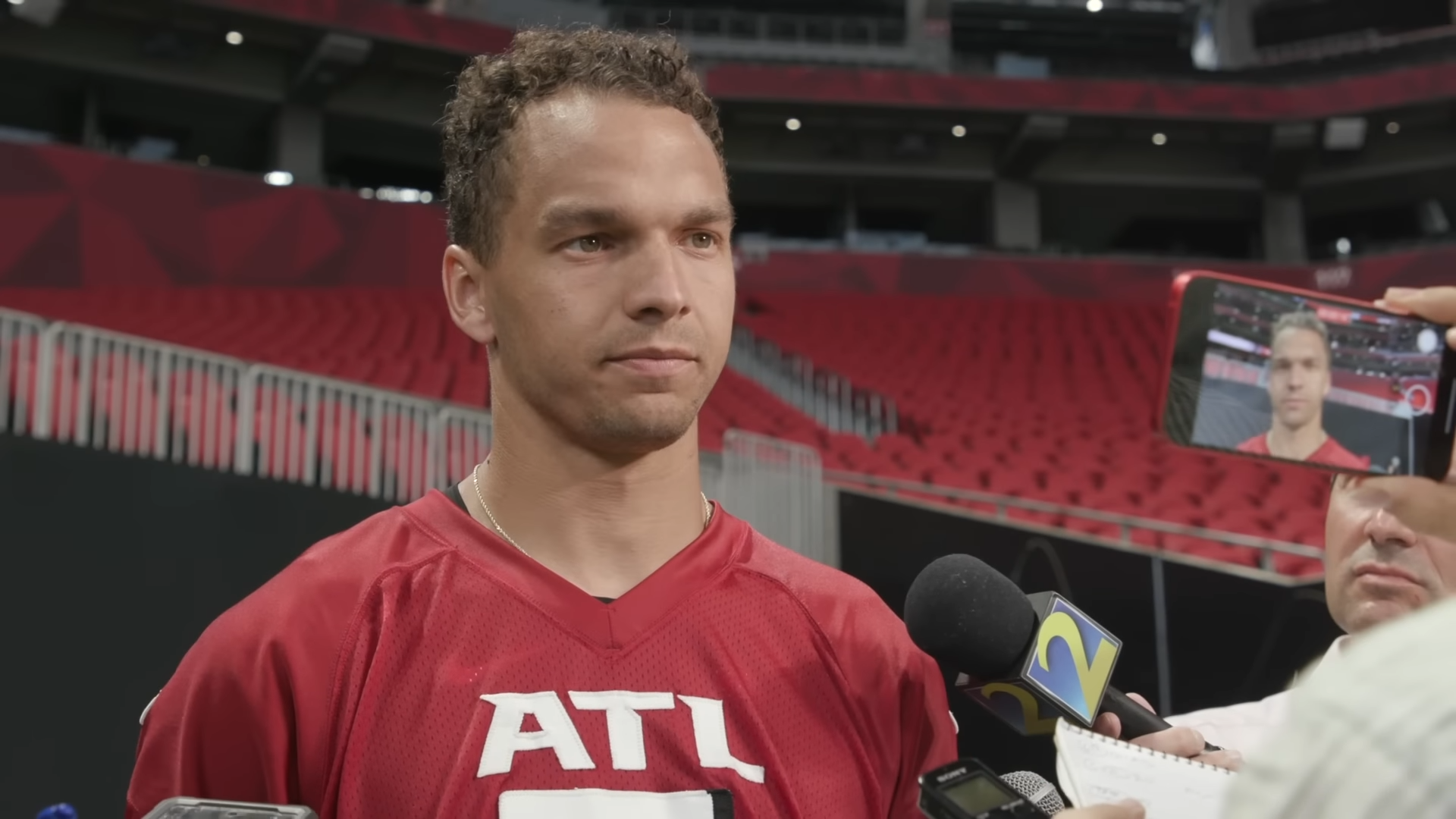
Desmond Ridder (2022–2023)

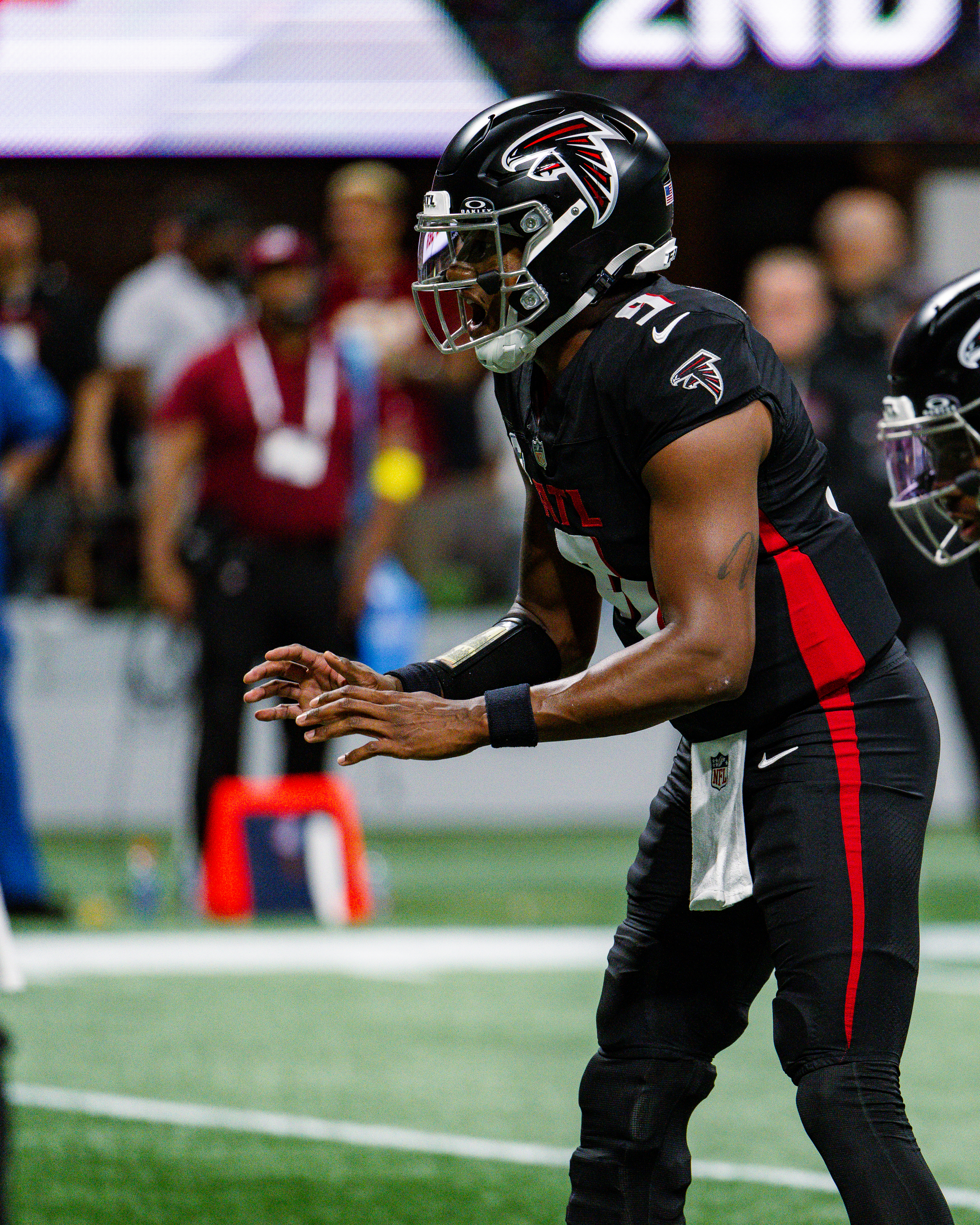
Michael Penix Jr. (2024–present)

The number of games they started during the season is listed to the right:

=== Regular season ===
Season	Regular season	Postseason	Ref.
1966	Randy Johnson (3–8) / Dennis Claridge (0–3)		
1967	Randy Johnson (1–10–1) / Terry Nofsinger (0–1) / Steve Sloan (0–1)		
1968	Bob Berry (1–6) / Randy Johnson (1–6)		
1969	Bob Berry (4–3) / Randy Johnson (2–3) / Bruce Lemmerman (0–2)		
1970	Bob Berry (3–7–2) / Randy Johnson (1–1)		
1971	Bob Berry (4–5–1) / Dick Shiner (3–1)		
1972	Bob Berry (7–7)		
1973	Bob Lee (8–2) / Dick Shiner (1–3)		
1974	Bob Lee (2–7) / Pat Sullivan (0–3) / Kim McQuilken (1–1)		
1975	Steve Bartkowski (4–7) / Kim McQuilken (0–2) / Pat Sullivan (0–1)		
1976	Scott Hunter (2–4) / Steve Bartkowski (1–4) / Kim McQuilken (1–2)		
1977	Scott Hunter (4–3) / Steve Bartkowski (3–4)		
1978	Steve Bartkowski (8–5) / June Jones (1–2)	Steve Bartkowski (1–1)	
1979	Steve Bartkowski (6–8) / June Jones (0–2)		
1980	Steve Bartkowski (12–4)	Steve Bartkowski (0–1)	
1981	Steve Bartkowski (7–9)		
1982	Steve Bartkowski (5–4)	Steve Bartkowski (0–1)	
1983	Steve Bartkowski (6–8) / Mike Moroski (1–1)		
1984	Steve Bartkowski (3–8) / Mike Moroski (1–4)		
1985	David Archer (4–7) / Steve Bartkowski (0–5)		
1986	David Archer (5–5–1) / Turk Schonert (2–3)		
1987	Scott Campbell (2–7) / Erik Kramer (1–1) / Chris Miller (0–2) / David Archer (0–1) / Jeff Van Raaphorst (0–1)		
1988	Chris Miller (5–8) / Steve Dils (0–3)		
1989	Chris Miller (3–12) / Hugh Millen (0–1)		
1990	Chris Miller (3–9) / Hugh Millen (2–0) / Scott Campbell (0–2)		
1991	Chris Miller (9–5) / Billy Joe Tolliver (1–1)	Chris Miller (1–1)	
1992	Chris Miller (3–5) / Billy Joe Tolliver (2–3) / Wade Wilson (1–2)		
1993	Bobby Hebert (4–8) / Billy Joe Tolliver (2–0) / Chris Miller (0–2)		
1994	Jeff George (7–9)		
1995	Jeff George (9–7)	Jeff George (0–1)	
1996	Bobby Hebert (3–10) / Jeff George (0–3)		
1997	Chris Chandler (7–7) / Billy Joe Tolliver (0–1) / Tony Graziani (0–1)		
1998	Chris Chandler (13–1) / Tony Graziani (1–0) / Steve DeBerg (0–1)	Chris Chandler (2–1)	
1999	Chris Chandler (4–8) / Tony Graziani (1–2) / Danny Kanell (0–1)		
2000	Chris Chandler (4–9) / Doug Johnson (0–2) / Danny Kanell (0–1)		
2001	Chris Chandler (6–8) / Michael Vick (1–1)		
2002	Michael Vick (8–6–1) / Doug Johnson (1–0)	Michael Vick (1–1)	
2003	Doug Johnson (1–7) / Michael Vick (3–1) / Kurt Kittner (1–3)		
2004	Michael Vick (11–4) / Matt Schaub (0–1)	Michael Vick (1–1)	
2005	Michael Vick (8–7) / Matt Schaub (0–1)		
2006	Michael Vick (7–9)		
2007	Joey Harrington (3–7) / Chris Redman (1–3) / Byron Leftwich (0–2)		
2008	Matt Ryan (11–5)	Matt Ryan (0–1)	
2009	Matt Ryan (9–5) / Chris Redman (0–2)		
2010	Matt Ryan (13–3)	Matt Ryan (0–1)	
2011	Matt Ryan (10–6)	Matt Ryan (0–1)	
2012	Matt Ryan (13–3)	Matt Ryan (1–1)	
2013	Matt Ryan (4–12)		
2014	Matt Ryan (6–10)		
2015	Matt Ryan (8–8)		
2016	Matt Ryan (11–5)	Matt Ryan (2–1)	
2017	Matt Ryan (10–6)	Matt Ryan (1–1)	
2018	Matt Ryan (7–9)		
2019	Matt Ryan (7–8) / Matt Schaub (0–1)		
2020	Matt Ryan (4–12)		
2021	Matt Ryan (7–10)		
2022	Marcus Mariota (5–8) / Desmond Ridder (2–2)		
2023	Desmond Ridder (6–7) / Taylor Heinicke (1–3)		
2024	Kirk Cousins (7–7) / Michael Penix Jr. (1–2)		
2025	Michael Penix Jr. (3–6) / Kirk Cousins (5–3)		
2026	Michael Penix Jr. (3–2) / Cooper Rush (0–2)		

== Most games as starting quarterback ==
These quarterbacks have the most starts for the Falcons in regular season games (through the 2021 NFL season).

Name	
GP	Games played
GS	Games started
W	Number of wins as starting quarterback
L	Number of losses as starting quarterback
T	Number of ties as starting quarterback
Pct	Winning percentage as starting quarterback

Name	Period	GP	GS	W	L	T	%
Matt Ryan	2008–2021	222	222	120	102	—	.541
Steve Bartkowski	1975–1985	123	121	55	66	—	.455
Michael Vick	2001–2006	74	67	38	28	1	.575
Chris Chandler	1997–2001	68	67	34	33	—	.507
Chris Miller	1987–1993	69	66	23	43	—	.348
Bob Berry	1968–1972	54	51	19	29	3	.402

== Team career passing records ==
=== Regular season ===
(Through the 2021 NFL season)

Name	Comp	Att	%	Yds	TD	Int
Matt Ryan	5,242	8,003	65.5	59,735	367	170
Steve Bartkowski	1,871	3,330	56.2	23,470	154	141
Chris Miller	1,129	2,089	54.0	14,066	87	72
Chris Chandler	981	1,672	58.7	13,268	87	56
Michael Vick	930	1,730	53.8	11,505	71	52
Jeff George	714	1,180	60.5	8,575	50	32
Bobby Hebert	637	1,066	59.8	7,053	50	49
Bob Berry	598	1,049	57.0	8,489	57	56

=== Postseason ===
Name	Comp	Att	%	Yds	TD	Int
Matt Ryan	237	351	67.5	2,672	20	7
Steve Bartkowski	53	101	52.4	792	5	8
Chris Miller	35	62	56.4	451	1	6
Chris Chandler	59	97	60.8	728	4	4
Michael Vick	58	103	56.3	609	3	3
Jeff George	30	54	55.5	366	2	2

== See also ==
- List of NFL starting quarterbacks
