= 1975 Atlanta Falcons season =

NFL team season

- Owner: Rankin M. Smith Sr.
- General manager: Pat Peppler
- Head coach: Marion Campbell
- Home stadium: Atlanta Stadium

Results
- Record: 4–10
- Division place: 3rd NFC West
- Playoffs: Did not qualify

The 1975 Atlanta Falcons season was the franchise's tenth year in the National Football League (NFL). With the first overall pick of the NFL draft, the Falcons selected quarterback Steve Bartkowski out of the University of California. However, the pick would do them no good as the Falcons slumped to another miserable 4–10 record and missed the playoffs for the 10th straight season. This was also the first and only full season for head coach Marion Campbell until the 1980s, as he was hired to coach the final 6 games of the previous season and was fired 5 games into the following season.

== Offseason ==
=== NFL draft ===
1975 Atlanta Falcons draft
| Round | Pick | Player | Position | College | Notes |
| 1 | 1 | Steve Bartkowski * | Quarterback | California | from Baltimore Colts |
| 2 | 29 | Ralph Ortega | Linebacker | Florida | |
| 3 | 65 | Woody Thompson | Running back | Miami (FL) | from Houston Oilers |
| 4 | 81 | John Nessel | Guard | Penn State | |
| 5 | 123 | Greg McCrary | Tight end | Clark Atlanta University | from Buffalo Bills |
| 6 | 132 | Fulton Kuykendall | Linebacker | UCLA | from Baltimore Colts |
| 6 | 133 | Doug Payton | Offensive tackle | Colorado | |
| 7 | 159 | Mike Esposito | Running back | Boston College | |
| 8 | 185 | Brent Adams | Offensive tackle | Chattanooga | |
| 9 | 211 | Brad Davis | Running back | LSU | |
| 10 | 237 | Marshall Mills | Wide receiver | West Virginia | |
| 11 | 263 | Jeff Merrow | Defensive end | West Virginia | |
| 12 | 289 | Alonza Pickett | Tackle | Texas Southern | |
| 13 | 315 | Carl Russ | Linebacker | Michigan | |
| 14 | 341 | Steve Robinson | Defensive tackle | Tuskegee | from Baltimore Colts |
| 15 | 367 | Jimmy Robinson | Wide receiver | Georgia Tech | |
| 16 | 393 | Steve Knutson | Tackle | USC | |
| 17 | 419 | Mitch Anderson | Quarterback | Northwestern | |
Made roster * Made at least one Pro Bowl during career

== Personnel ==
=== Staff ===
1975 Atlanta Falcons staff
| Front office: Chairman of the board – Rankin M. Smith Sr.; President – Frank E. Wall; General manager – Pat Peppler; Head coaches: Head coach – Marion Campbell; Offensive coaches: Offensive coordinator – Bill Nelsen; Offensive backfield – John Rauch; Receivers – Jimmy Orr; Offensive line – Bill Walsh | Defensive coaches: Defensive coordinator – Fred Bruney; Defensive line – Eddie Khayat; Linebackers – Marv Matuszak; Defensive backfield – Al Lavan |

=== Roster ===
1975 Atlanta Falcons roster
| Quarterbacks (QB): 10 Steve Bartkowski; 11 Kim McQuilken; 7 Pat Sullivan; Running backs (RB): 25 Larry Crowe; 46 Monroe Eley; 43 Dave Hampton; 42 Mack Herron; 24 Haskel Stanback; 48 Woody Thompson; Wide receivers (WR): 82 Ken Burrow; 89 Wallace Francis; 84 Alfred Jenkins; 81 Frank Pitts; Tight ends (TE): 88 Greg McCrary; 86 Jim Mitchell | Offensive linemen (OL): 61 Brent Adams T; 63 Nick Bebout T; 65 Len Gotshalk T; 56 Dennis Havig G; 68 Larron Jackson G; 53 Paul Ryczek C; 64 Royce Smith G; 57 Jeff Van Note C; Defensive linemen (DL): 78 Roy Hilton DE; 69 Mike Lewis DT; 75 Jeff Merrow DE; 74 Mike Tilleman DT; 79 Chuck Walker DE/DT; 71 John Zook DE | Linebackers (LB): 50 Greg Brezina OLB; 58 Don Hansen OLB; 54 Fulton Kuykendall OLB; 60 Tommy Nobis MLB; 55 Ralph Ortega MLB; 59 Carl Russ OLB; Defensive backs (DB): 34 Ray Brown FS; 38 Rick Byas CB; 32 Ray Easterling SS; 27 Tom Hayes CB; 40 Bob Jones CB/S; 22 Rolland Lawrence CB; Special teams (ST): 6 John James P; 12 Nick Mike-Mayer K | Reserve: 47 Brad Davis RB (IR); 26 Mike Esposito RB (IR); 66 Ted Fritsch C (IR); 87 Claude Humphrey DE (IR); 20 Vince Kendrick RB (IR); 29 Ron Mabra CB (IR); 83 Larry Mialik TE (IR); Rookies in italics |

== Regular season ==
=== Schedule ===
| Week | Date | Opponent | Result | Record | Venue | Attendance | Recap |
|---|---|---|---|---|---|---|---|
| 1 | September 21 | at St. Louis Cardinals | **L** 20–23 | 0–1 | Busch Memorial Stadium | 42,172 | Recap |
| 2 | September 28 | Detroit Lions | **L** 14–17 | 0–2 | Atlanta Stadium | 45,218 | Recap |
| 3 | October 5 | **New Orleans Saints** | **W** 14–7 | 1–2 | Atlanta Stadium | 29,444 | Recap |
| 4 | October 12 | at **San Francisco 49ers** | **W** 17–3 | 2–2 | Candlestick Park | 44,043 | Recap |
| 5 | October 19 | at **Los Angeles Rams** | **L** 7–22 | 2–3 | Los Angeles Memorial Coliseum | 64,843 | Recap |
| 6 | October 26 | Cincinnati Bengals | **L** 14–21 | 2–4 | Atlanta Stadium | 45,811 | Recap |
| 7 | November 2 | at **New Orleans Saints** | **L** 7–23 | 2–5 | Louisiana Superdome | 49,342 | Recap |
| 8 | November 9 | at Minnesota Vikings | **L** 0–38 | 2–6 | Metropolitan Stadium | 43,751 | Recap |
| 9 | November 16 | **Los Angeles Rams** | **L** 7–16 | 2–7 | Atlanta Stadium | 44,595 | Recap |
| 10 | November 23 | Denver Broncos | **W** 35–21 | 3–7 | Atlanta Stadium | 28,686 | Recap |
| 11 | November 30 | at Oakland Raiders | **L** 34–37 (OT) | 3–8 | Oakland–Alameda County Coliseum | 50,860 | Recap |
| 12 | December 7 | Washington Redskins | **L** 27–30 | 3–9 | Atlanta Stadium | 52,809 | Recap |
| 13 | December 14 | **San Francisco 49ers** | **W** 31–9 | 4–9 | Atlanta Stadium | 38,501 | Recap |
| 14 | December 21 | at Green Bay Packers | **L** 13–22 | 4–10 | Lambeau Field | 56,267 | Recap |
Note: Intra-division opponents are in **bold** text.

=== Game summaries ===
==== Week 1: at St. Louis Cardinals ====
Week 1: Atlanta Falcons at St. Louis Cardinals – Game summary

| Quarter | 1 | 2 | 3 | 4 | Total |
|---|---|---|---|---|---|
| Falcons | 7 | 6 | 7 | 0 | **20** |
| **Cardinals** | 7 | 6 | 0 | 10 | **23** |

at Busch Memorial Stadium, St. Louis, Missouri

- Date: September 21
- Game time: 2:00 p.m. EDT/1:00 p.m. CDT
- Game weather: 54 °F (12 °C)
- Game attendance: 42,172
- Box score

Game information

**First quarter**

- STL – Terry Metcalf 39-yard run (Jim Bakken kick). Cardinals 7–0.
- ATL – Steve Bartkowski 1-yard run (Nick Mike-Mayer kick). Tied 7–7.

**Second quarter**

- STL – Jim Bakken 22-yard field goal. Cardinals 10–7.
- ATL – Dave Hampton 6-yard run (kick failed). Falcons 13–10.
- STL – Jim Bakken 39-yard field goal. Tied 13–13.

**Third quarter**

- ATL – Dave Hampton 1-yard run (Nick Mike-Mayer kick). Falcons 20–13.

**Fourth quarter**

- STL – Earl Thomas 8-yard pass from Jim Hart (Jim Bakken kick). Tied 20–20.
- STL – Jim Bakken 25-yard field goal. Cardinals 23–20.

**Top passers**

- ATL – Steve Bartkowski – 8/16, 81 yards, INT
- STL – Jim Hart – 12/23, 150 yards, TD, 2 INT

**Top rushers**

- ATL – Dave Hampton – 23 rushes, 135 yards, 2 TD
- STL – Terry Metcalf – 20 rushes, 99 yards, TD

**Top receivers**

- ATL – Woody Thompson – 3 receptions, 29 yards
- STL – Mel Gray – 3 receptions, 65 yards

==== Week 2: vs. Detroit Lions ====
Week 2: Detroit Lions at Atlanta Falcons – Game summary

| Quarter | 1 | 2 | 3 | 4 | Total |
|---|---|---|---|---|---|
| **Lions** | 0 | 7 | 3 | 7 | **17** |
| Falcons | 0 | 7 | 7 | 0 | **14** |

at Atlanta Stadium, Atlanta, Georgia

- Date: September 28
- Game time: 1:00 p.m. EDT
- Game weather: 62 °F (17 °C)
- Game attendance: 45,218
- Box score

Game information

**First quarter**

- No scoring plays

**Second quarter**

- ATL – Haskel Stanback 17-yard run (Nick Mike-Mayer kick). Falcons 7–0.
- DET – Horace King 5-yard run (Errol Mann kick). Tied 7–7.

**Third quarter**

- ATL – Gerald Tinker 26-yard pass from Steve Bartkowski (Nick Mike-Mayer kick). Falcons 14–7.
- DET – Errol Mann 29-yard field goal. Falcons 14–10.

**Fourth quarter**

- DET – Altie Taylor 1-yard run (Errol Mann kick). Lions 17–14.

**Top passers**

- DET – Greg Landry – 12/21, 146 yards
- ATL – Steve Bartkowski – 7/22, 104 yards, TD, INT

**Top rushers**

- DET – Altie Taylor – 16 rushes, 63 yards, TD
- ATL – Dave Hampton – 21 rushes, 86 yards

**Top receivers**

- DET – Ray Jarvis – 5 receptions, 64 yards
- ATL – Ken Burrow – 3 receptions, 43 yards

==== Week 3: vs. New Orleans Saints ====
Week 3: New Orleans Saints at Atlanta Falcons – Game summary

| Quarter | 1 | 2 | 3 | 4 | Total |
|---|---|---|---|---|---|
| Saints | 0 | 0 | 7 | 0 | **7** |
| **Falcons** | 7 | 7 | 0 | 0 | **14** |

at Atlanta Stadium, Atlanta, Georgia

- Date: October 5
- Game time: 1:00 p.m. EDT
- Game weather: 55 °F (13 °C)
- Game attendance: 29,444
- Box score

Game information

**First quarter**

- ATL – Ken Burrow 9-yard pass from Steve Bartkowski (Nick Mike-Mayer kick). Falcons 7–0.

**Second quarter**

- ATL – Jim Mitchell 50-yard fumble return (Nick Mike-Mayer kick). Falcons 14–0.

**Third quarter**

- NO – Alvin Maxson 1-yard run (Bill McClard kick). Falcons 14–7.

**Fourth quarter**

- No scoring plays

**Top passers**

- NO – Archie Manning – 15/31, 146 yards, 2 INT
- ATL – Steve Bartkowski – 11/23, 119 yards, TD, INT

**Top rushers**

- NO – Mike Strachan – 14 rushes, 71 yards
- ATL – Dave Hampton – 25 rushes, 101 yards

**Top receivers**

- NO – Alvin Maxson – 11 receptions, 71 yards
- ATL – Jim Mitchell – 3 receptions, 65 yards

==== Week 4: at San Francisco 49ers ====
Week 4: Atlanta Falcons at San Francisco 49ers – Game summary

| Quarter | 1 | 2 | 3 | 4 | Total |
|---|---|---|---|---|---|
| **Falcons** | 7 | 7 | 3 | 0 | **17** |
| 49ers | 0 | 0 | 3 | 0 | **3** |

at Candlestick Park, San Francisco, California

- Date: October 12
- Game time: 4:00 p.m. EDT/1:00 p.m. PDT
- Game weather: 57 °F (14 °C)
- Game attendance: 44,043
- Box score

Game information

**First quarter**

- ATL – Jim Mitchell 9-yard pass from Steve Bartkowski (Nick Mike-Mayer kick). Falcons 7–0.

**Second quarter**

- ATL – Haskel Stanback 26-yard run (Nick Mike-Mayer kick). Falcons 14–0.

**Third quarter**

- SF – Steve Mike-Mayer 26-yard field goal. Falcons 14–3.
- ATL – Nick Mike-Mayer 27-yard field goal. Falcons 17–3.

**Fourth quarter**

- No scoring plays

**Top passers**

- ATL – Steve Bartkowski – 9/20, 96 yards, TD
- SF – Norm Snead – 16/28, 196 yards, 4 INT

**Top rushers**

- ATL – Haskel Stanback – 6 rushes, 40 yards, TD
- SF – Larry Schreiber – 13 rushes, 54 yards

**Top receivers**

- ATL – Ken Burrow – 2 receptions, 35 yards
- SF – Gene Washington – 5 receptions, 66 yards

==== Week 5: at Los Angeles Rams ====
Week 5: Atlanta Falcons at Los Angeles Rams – Game summary

| Quarter | 1 | 2 | 3 | 4 | Total |
|---|---|---|---|---|---|
| Falcons | 0 | 0 | 0 | 7 | **7** |
| **Rams** | 10 | 6 | 6 | 0 | **22** |

at Los Angeles Memorial Coliseum, Los Angeles, California

- Date: October 19
- Game time: 4:00 p.m. EDT/1:00 p.m. PDT
- Game weather: 61 °F (16 °C)
- Game attendance: 64,843

==== Week 6: vs. Cincinnati Bengals ====
Week 6: Cincinnati Bengals at Atlanta Falcons – Game summary

| Quarter | 1 | 2 | 3 | 4 | Total |
|---|---|---|---|---|---|
| **Bengals** | 0 | 14 | 0 | 7 | **21** |
| Falcons | 7 | 0 | 0 | 7 | **14** |

at Atlanta Stadium, Atlanta, Georgia

- Date: October 26
- Game time: 1:00 p.m. EST
- Game weather: 60 °F (16 °C)
- Game attendance: 45,811

==== Week 7: at New Orleans Saints ====
Week 7: Atlanta Falcons at New Orleans Saints – Game summary

| Quarter | 1 | 2 | 3 | 4 | Total |
|---|---|---|---|---|---|
| Falcons | 0 | 0 | 0 | 7 | **7** |
| **Saints** | 0 | 10 | 10 | 3 | **23** |

at Louisiana Superdome, New Orleans, Louisiana

- Date: November 2
- Game time: 2:00 p.m. EST/1:00 p.m. CST
- Game weather: None (played indoors)
- Game attendance: 49,342

==== Week 8: at Minnesota Vikings ====
Week 8: Atlanta Falcons at Minnesota Vikings – Game summary

| Quarter | 1 | 2 | 3 | 4 | Total |
|---|---|---|---|---|---|
| Falcons | 0 | 0 | 0 | 0 | **0** |
| **Vikings** | 7 | 17 | 7 | 7 | **38** |

at Metropolitan Stadium, Bloomington, Minnesota

- Date: November 9
- Game time: 2:00 p.m. EST/1:00 p.m. CST
- Game weather: 46 °F (8 °C)
- Game attendance: 43,751
- Box score

Game information

**First quarter**

- MIN – Chuck Foreman 3-yard pass from Fran Tarkenton (Fred Cox kick). Vikings 7–0.

**Second quarter**

- MIN – Fred Cox 45-yard field goal. Vikings 10–0.
- MIN – Chuck Foreman 1-yard run (Fred Cox kick). Vikings 17–0.
- MIN – Chuck Foreman 1-yard run (Fred Cox kick). Vikings 24–0.

**Third quarter**

- MIN – Jim Lash 12-yard pass from Bob Lee (Fred Cox kick). Vikings 31–0.

**Fourth quarter**

- MIN – Dave Osborn 2-yard run (Fred Cox kick). Vikings 38–0.

**Top passers**

- ATL – Kim McQuilken – 5/26, 43 yards, 5 INT
- MIN – Fran Tarkenton – 11/22, 47 yards, TD

**Top rushers**

- ATL – Dave Hampton – 9 rushes, 39 yards
- MIN – Chuck Foreman – 26 rushes, 102 yards, 2 TD

**Top receivers**

- ATL – Dave Hampton – 1 reception, 15 yards
- MIN – Chuck Foreman – 4 receptions, 19 yards, TD

Kim McQuilken started at quarterback for the Falcons, going 5 of 26 (for a completion percentage of 19.2) for 43 yards and threw five interceptions, finishing the game with a passer rating of zero.

==== Week 9: vs. Los Angeles Rams ====
Week 9: Los Angeles Rams at Atlanta Falcons – Game summary

| Quarter | 1 | 2 | 3 | 4 | Total |
|---|---|---|---|---|---|
| **Rams** | 0 | 6 | 3 | 7 | **16** |
| Falcons | 0 | 0 | 0 | 7 | **7** |

at Atlanta Stadium, Atlanta, Georgia

- Date: November 16
- Game time: 1:00 p.m. EST
- Game weather: 47 °F (8 °C)
- Game attendance: 44,595

==== Week 10: vs. Denver Broncos ====
Week 10: Denver Broncos at Atlanta Falcons – Game summary

| Quarter | 1 | 2 | 3 | 4 | Total |
|---|---|---|---|---|---|
| Broncos | 7 | 0 | 7 | 7 | **21** |
| **Falcons** | 0 | 14 | 7 | 14 | **35** |

at Atlanta Stadium, Atlanta, Georgia

- Date: November 23
- Game time: 1:00 p.m. EST
- Game weather: 36 °F (2 °C)
- Game attendance: 28,686

==== Week 11: at Oakland Raiders ====
Week 11: Atlanta Falcons at Oakland Raiders – Game summary

| Quarter | 1 | 2 | 3 | 4 | OT | Total |
|---|---|---|---|---|---|---|
| Falcons | 13 | 7 | 0 | 14 | 0 | **34** |
| **Raiders** | 21 | 0 | 3 | 10 | 3 | **37** |

at Oakland–Alameda County Coliseum, Oakland, California

- Date: November 30
- Game time: 4:00 p.m. EST/1:00 p.m. PST
- Game weather: 47 °F (8 °C)
- Game attendance: 50,860

==== Week 12: vs. Washington Redskins ====
Week 12: Washington Redskins at Atlanta Falcons – Game summary

| Quarter | 1 | 2 | 3 | 4 | Total |
|---|---|---|---|---|---|
| **Redskins** | 3 | 7 | 7 | 13 | **30** |
| Falcons | 0 | 14 | 3 | 10 | **27** |

at Atlanta Stadium, Atlanta, Georgia

- Date: December 7
- Game time: 1:00 p.m. EST
- Game weather: 57 °F (14 °C)
- Game attendance: 52,809

==== Week 13: vs. San Francisco 49ers ====
Week 13: San Francisco 49ers at Atlanta Falcons – Game summary

| Quarter | 1 | 2 | 3 | 4 | Total |
|---|---|---|---|---|---|
| 49ers | 0 | 9 | 0 | 0 | **9** |
| **Falcons** | 0 | 10 | 14 | 7 | **31** |

at Atlanta Stadium, Atlanta, Georgia

- Date: December 14
- Game time: 1:00 p.m. EST
- Game weather: 57 °F (14 °C)
- Game attendance: 38,501

==== Week 14: at Green Bay Packers ====
Week 14: Atlanta Falcons at Green Bay Packers – Game summary

| Quarter | 1 | 2 | 3 | 4 | Total |
|---|---|---|---|---|---|
| Falcons | 6 | 0 | 0 | 7 | **13** |
| **Packers** | 3 | 9 | 10 | 0 | **22** |

at Lambeau Field, Green Bay, Wisconsin

- Date: December 21
- Game time: 2:00 p.m. EST/1:00 p.m. CST
- Game weather: 10 °F (−12 °C)
- Game attendance: 56,267
- Box score

Game information

**First quarter**

- GB – Joe Danelo 34-yard field goal. Packers 3–0.
- ATL – Dave Hampton 1-yard run (kick failed). Falcons 6–3.

**Second quarter**

- GB – Eric Torkelson 15-yard run (kick failed). Packers 9–6.
- GB – Joe Danelo 30-yard field goal. Packers 12–6.

**Third quarter**

- GB – Joe Danelo 19-yard field goal. Packers 15–6.
- GB – Barty Smith 1-yard run (Joe Danelo kick). Packers 22–6.

**Fourth quarter**

- ATL – Alfred Jenkins 52-yard pass from Steve Bartkowski (Nick Mike-Mayer kick). Packers 22–13.

**Top passers**

- ATL – Steve Bartkowski – 13/34, 219 yards, TD, 2 INT
- GB – John Hadl – 16/32, 181 yards, INT

**Top rushers**

- ATL – Dave Hampton – 14 rushes, 61 yards, TD
- GB – Eric Torkelson – 22 rushes, 86 yards, TD

**Top receivers**

- ATL – Alfred Jenkins – 2 receptions, 81 yards, TD
- GB – Rich McGeorge – 3 receptions, 46 yards

=== Standings ===
NFC West
| | W | L | T | PCT | DIV | CONF | PF | PA | STK |
|---|---|---|---|---|---|---|---|---|---|
| Los Angeles Rams^{(2)} | 12 | 2 | 0 | .857 | 5–1 | 9–2 | 312 | 135 | W6 |
| San Francisco 49ers | 5 | 9 | 0 | .357 | 3–3 | 4–7 | 255 | 286 | L4 |
| Atlanta Falcons | 4 | 10 | 0 | .286 | 3–3 | 3–8 | 240 | 289 | L1 |
| New Orleans Saints | 2 | 12 | 0 | .143 | 1–5 | 2–9 | 165 | 360 | L7 |
