= 1974 Atlanta Falcons season =

NFL team season

- Owner: Rankin M. Smith Sr.
- General manager: Norm Van Brocklin (fired Nov. 6)
- Head coach: Norm Van Brocklin (fired Nov. 6; 2–6 record); Marion Campbell (interim; 1–5 record)
- Home stadium: Atlanta Stadium

Results
- Record: 3–11
- Division place: 4th NFC West
- Playoffs: Did not qualify
- All-Pros: 1: DE Claude Humphrey (2nd team)
- Pro Bowlers: 3: C Jeff Van Note; T George Kunz; DE Claude Humphrey

The 1974 Atlanta Falcons season was the franchise's ninth year in the National Football League (NFL). After coming close to their maiden postseason appearance the previous season and finishing with a best-to-date 9–5 record despite an upset loss to the Cardinals, the Falcons traded star cornerback Ken Reaves to the archrival New Orleans Saints to obtain in-demand guard Royce Smith, a former Georgia Bulldogs All-American, in a widely criticized move (Reaves played only five games for New Orleans before he was cut; he signed with St. Louis, where he remained through his retirement in 1978). During the strike-affected pre-season, they beat the Eagles 23–7 in a rain-soaked match, before losing to the Raiders, 28–16. Soon afterwards the Falcons lost key offensive tackle Bill Sandeman for the entire season with a slipped disc in his back.

Along with a form lapse from quarterback Bob Lee and an injury to running back Dave Hampton, this destroyed the Falcons’ offense. The 1974 Falcons scored 111 points with a mere twelve touchdowns, the lowest total in franchise history, and the second lowest by any team in a fourteen-game NFL season after the infamous “Zero Gang” offense of the 1977 Buccaneers who were shut out six times in fourteen games. Their failure to score more than seventeen points in any game has been equalled since only by the infamous offense of the 1992 Seahawks. Overall, Bob Lee, statistically, had one of the poorest seasons by a quarterback in Atlanta Falcons history, throwing for 852 yards, just 3 touchdowns, 14 interceptions, and completed just 45.3% of his passes (going 78 for 172) to go with his 32.4 passer rating. He also got sacked 31 times for 269 yards.

The Falcons sacked long-serving head coach Norman van Brocklin after being thrashed by the Miami Dolphins and having heard demands from fans to make that move. Three of his successors have suffered the same humiliation in the middle of a season: Marion Campbell (1976 and 1989), Dan Reeves (2003) and Dan Quinn (2020), and Bobby Petrino quit with three games remaining in 2007.

The 1974 Falcons suffered through the humiliation of being the first Falcons team to be swept by the Saints since the teams became division rivals with the AFL-NFL merger. The Saints entered the season 1–9 all-time vs. the Falcons, with that win coming in the teams' first meeting in 1967. New Orleans did not sweep Atlanta again until 1983.

== Offseason ==
=== NFL draft ===
1974 Atlanta Falcons draft
Round	Pick	Player	Position	College	Notes
2	44	Gerald Tinker	Wide receiver	Kent State	Selected two spots ahead of Kent State teammate Jack Lambert.
3	69	Kim McQuilken	Quarterback	Lehigh	
4	96	Vince Kendrick	Running back	Florida	
5	128	Monroe Eley	Running back	Arizona State	Would join the Falcons in 1975 after having played in the CFL for the British Columbia Lions between 1972 and 1974.
6	147	Doyle Orange	Running back	Southern Mississippi	
7	173	Jim Coode	Offensive tackle	Michigan	Played in the CFL for the Ottawa Rough Riders up to 1980.
9	225	Larry Bailey	Defensive tackle	Pacific	
10	252	Paul Ryczek	Center	Virginia	
11	277	Eddie Wilson	Wide receiver	Albany State	
12	304	Vic Kögel	Linebacker	Ohio State	
13	329	Ralph Powell	Running back	Nebraska	
14	356	John Givens	Guard	Villanova	
15	381	Willie Jones	Wide receiver	Iowa State	
16	408	Sylvester McGee	Running back	Rhode Island	
17	433	Al Davis	Guard	Boise State	
Made roster * Made at least one Pro Bowl during career

== Personnel ==
=== Staff ===
1974 Atlanta Falcons staff
Front office: Chairman of the board – Rankin M. Smith Sr.; President – Frank E. Wall; General manager – Norm Van Brocklin; Head coaches: Head coach – Norm Van Brocklin (games 1-8) Marion Campbell (games 9-14); Offensive coaches: Offensive backfield – Billy Ray Barnes; Receivers – Harry Gilmer; Offensive line – Duane Putnam	Defensive coaches: Head defensive – Marion Campbell; Defensive line – Bob Griffin; Linebackers – Marv Matuszak; Defensive backfield – Fred Bruney

=== Roster ===
1974 Atlanta Falcons roster
Quarterbacks (QB): 19 Bob Lee; 11 Kim McQuilken; 7 Pat Sullivan; Running backs (RB): 43 Dave Hampton; 20 Vince Kendrick; 25 Art Malone; 31 Molly McGee; 44 Eddie Ray; 24 Haskel Stanback; Wide receivers (WR): 82 Ken Burrow; 41 Al Dodd; 84 Tom Geredine; 80 Louis Neal; 81 Gerald Tinker; Tight ends (TE): 83 Larry Mialik; 86 Jim Mitchell	Offensive linemen (OL): 63 Nick Bebout T; 66 Ted Fritsch C; 65 Len Gotshalk T; 56 Dennis Havig G; 75 George Kunz T; 55 Jim Miller G; 53 Paul Ryczek C; 64 Royce Smith G; 57 Jeff Van Note C; Defensive linemen (DL): 68 Larry Bailey DE; 87 Claude Humphrey DE; 69 Mike Lewis DT; 77 Rosie Manning DT; 74 Mike Tilleman DT; 79 Chuck Walker DT; 71 John Zook DE	Linebackers (LB): 50 Greg Brezina OLB; 58 Don Hansen OLB; 52 Ken Mitchell OLB; 60 Tommy Nobis MLB; 51 Dick Palmer OLB; 59 Lonnie Warwick MLB; Defensive backs (DB): 34 Ray Brown SS; 32 Ray Easterling SS; 29 Clarence Ellis FS; 27 Tom Hayes CB; 45 Ron Simmons CB; 22 Rolland Lawrence CB; 38 Rick Byas CB; Special teams (ST): 6 John James P; 12 Nick Mike-Mayer K	Reserve: 61 Bill Sandeman T (IR); Rookies in italics

== Regular season ==
=== Schedule ===
Week	Date	Opponent	Result	Record	Venue	Attendance	Recap
1	September 15	Dallas Cowboys	**L** 0–24	0–1	Atlanta Stadium	52,322	Recap
2	September 22	**San Francisco 49ers**	**L** 10–16	0–2	Atlanta Stadium	47,686	Recap
3	September 29	at **New Orleans Saints**	**L** 13–14	0–3	Tulane Stadium	62,273	Recap
4	October 6	at New York Giants	**W** 14–7	1–3	Yale Bowl	42,379	Recap
5	October 13	Chicago Bears	**W** 13–10	2–3	Atlanta Stadium	47,835	Recap
6	October 20	**New Orleans Saints**	**L** 3–13	2–4	Atlanta Stadium	47,217	Recap
7	October 28	at Pittsburgh Steelers	**L** 17–24	2–5	Three Rivers Stadium	48,094	Recap
8	November 3	at Miami Dolphins	**L** 7–42	2–6	Miami Orange Bowl	64,399	Recap
9	November 10	at **Los Angeles Rams**	**L** 0–21	2–7	Los Angeles Memorial Coliseum	70,056	Recap
10	November 17	Baltimore Colts	**L** 7–17	2–8	Atlanta Stadium	41,278	Recap
11	November 24	at **San Francisco 49ers**	**L** 0–27	2–9	Candlestick Park	45,435	Recap
12	December 1	**Los Angeles Rams**	**L** 7–30	2–10	Atlanta Stadium	18,648	Recap
13	December 7	at Minnesota Vikings	**L** 10–23	2–11	Metropolitan Stadium	47,105	Recap
14	December 15	Green Bay Packers	**W** 10–3	3–11	Atlanta Stadium	10,020	Recap
Note: Intra-division opponents are in **bold** text.

=== Game summaries ===
==== Week 1: vs. Dallas Cowboys ====
Week 1: Atlanta Falcons at Dallas Cowboys – Game summary

Quarter	1	2	3	4	Total
**Cowboys**	7	10	0	7	**24**
Falcons	0	0	0	0	**0**

at Atlanta Stadium, Atlanta, Georgia

- Date: September 15
- Game time: 4:00 p.m. EDT
- Game weather: Partly cloudy, 71 °F (22 °C)
- Game attendance: 52,322
- Box score

Game information

**First quarter**

- DAL – Roger Staubach 9-yard run (Mac Percival kick). Cowboys 7–0.

**Second quarter**

- DAL – Mac Percival 33-yard field goal. Cowboys 10–0.
- DAL – Golden Richards 52-yard pass from Roger Staubach (Mac Percival kick). Cowboys 17–0.

**Third quarter**

- No scoring plays

**Fourth quarter**

- DAL – Robert Newhouse 1-yard run (Mac Percival kick). Cowboys 24–0.

**Top passers**

- DAL – Roger Staubach – 13/27, 252 yards, TD
- ATL – Pat Sullivan – 4/6, 44 yards, INT

**Top rushers**

- DAL – Calvin Hill – 11 rushes, 58 yards
- ATL – Eddie Ray – 12 rushes, 36 yards

**Top receivers**

- DAL – Drew Pearson – 5 receptions, 95 yards
- ATL – Jim Mitchell – 1 reception, 15 yards

==== Week 2: vs. San Francisco 49ers ====
Week 2: San Francisco 49ers at Atlanta Falcons – Game summary

Quarter	1	2	3	4	Total
**49ers**	13	0	0	3	**16**
Falcons	7	0	0	3	**10**

at Atlanta Stadium, Atlanta, Georgia

- Date: September 22
- Game time: 1:00 p.m. EDT
- Game weather: Cloudy, 68 °F (20 °C)
- Game attendance: 47,686
- Box score

Game information

**First quarter**

- SF – Danny Abramowicz 13-yard pass from Joe Reed (kick failed). 49ers 6–0.
- SF – Larry Schreiber 1-yard run (Bruce Gossett kick). 49ers 13–0.
- ATL – Art Malone 1-yard run (Nick Mike-Mayer kick). 49ers 13–7.

**Second quarter**

- No scoring plays

**Third quarter**

- No scoring plays

**Fourth quarter**

- ATL – Nick Mike-Mayer 32-yard field goal. 49ers 13–10.
- SF – Bruce Gossett 25-yard field goal. 49ers 16–10.

**Top passers**

- SF – Joe Reed – 7/22, 101 yards, TD, INT
- ATL – Bob Lee – 10/23, 99 yards, 3 INT

**Top rushers**

- SF – Larry Schreiber – 18 rushes, 70 yards, TD
- ATL – Eddie Ray – 17 rushes, 58 yards

**Top receivers**

- SF – Wilbur Jackson – 2 receptions, 45 yards
- ATL – Ken Burrow – 4 receptions, 57 yards

==== Week 3: at New Orleans Saints ====
Week 3: Atlanta Falcons at New Orleans Saints – Game summary

Quarter	1	2	3	4	Total
Falcons	0	7	3	3	**13**
**Saints**	0	7	0	7	**14**

at Tulane Stadium, New Orleans, Louisiana

- Date: September 29
- Game time: 1:00 p.m. EDT/12:00 p.m. CDT
- Game weather: Cloudy, 79 °F (26 °C)
- Game attendance: 62,273
- Box score

Game information

**First quarter**

- No scoring plays

**Second quarter**

- NO – Joel Parker 13-yard pass from Archie Manning (Bill McClard kick). Saints 7–0.
- ATL – Gerald Tinker 72-yard punt return (Nick Mike-Mayer kick). Tied 7–7.

**Third quarter**

- ATL – Nick Mike-Mayer 21-yard field goal. Falcons 10–7.

**Fourth quarter**

- ATL – Nick Mike-Mayer 27-yard field goal. Falcons 13–7.
- NO – Jess Phillips 8-yard run (Bill McClard kick). Saints 14–13.

**Top passers**

- ATL – Pat Sullivan – 7/20, 74 yards, INT
- NO – Archie Manning – 6/14, 47 yards, TD, INT

**Top rushers**

- ATL – Haskel Stanback – 18 rushes, 73 yards
- NO – Jess Phillips – 16 rushes, 63 yards, TD

**Top receivers**

- ATL – Jim Mitchell – 2 receptions, 40 yards
- NO – John Beasley – 1 reception, 30 yards

==== Week 4: at New York Giants ====
Week 4: Atlanta Falcons at New York Giants – Game summary

Quarter	1	2	3	4	Total
**Falcons**	0	7	7	0	**14**
Giants	7	0	0	0	**7**

at Yale Bowl, New Haven, Connecticut

- Date: October 6
- Game time: 1:00 p.m. EDT
- Game weather: Partly cloudy, 63 °F (17 °C)
- Game attendance: 42,379
- Box score

Game information

**First quarter**

- NYG – Doug Kotar 53-yard run (Pete Gogolak kick). Giants 7–0.

**Second quarter**

- ATL – Jim Mitchell 15-yard pass from Bob Lee (Nick Mike-Mayer kick). Tied 7–7.

**Third quarter**

- ATL – Ray Brown 59-yard interception return (Nick Mike-Mayer kick). Falcons 14–7.

**Fourth quarter**

- No scoring plays

**Top passers**

- ATL – Bob Lee – 10/17, 142 yards, TD, 3 INT
- NYG – Norm Snead – 10/20, 85 yards, 2 INT

**Top rushers**

- ATL – Haskel Stanback – 15 rushes, 64 yards
- NYG – Doug Kotar – 15 rushes, 119 yards, TD

**Top receivers**

- ATL – Jim Mitchell – 3 receptions, 55 yards, TD
- NYG – Bob Grim – 2 receptions, 24 yards

==== Week 5: vs. Chicago Bears ====
Week 5: Chicago Bears at Atlanta Falcons – Game summary

Quarter	1	2	3	4	Total
Bears	0	0	0	10	**10**
**Falcons**	0	7	3	3	**13**

at Atlanta Stadium, Atlanta, Georgia

- Date: October 13
- Game time: 1:00 p.m. EDT
- Game weather: Partly cloudy, 68 °F (20 °C)
- Game attendance: 47,835
- Box score

Game information

**First quarter**

- No scoring plays

**Second quarter**

- ATL – Bob Lee 1-yard run (Nick Mike-Mayer kick). Falcons 7–0.

**Third quarter**

- ATL – Nick Mike-Mayer 35-yard field goal. Falcons 10–0.

**Fourth quarter**

- CHI – Bo Rather 59-yard pass from Gary Huff (Mirro Roder kick). Falcons 10–7.
- CHI – Mirro Roder 37-yard field goal. Tied 10–10.
- ATL – Nick Mike-Mayer 31-yard field goal. Falcons 13–10.

**Top passers**

- CHI – Gary Huff – 14/25, 177 yards, TD, 2 INT
- ATL – Bob Lee – 10/18, 121 yards, 2 INT

**Top rushers**

- CHI – Carl Garrett – 14 rushes, 50 yards
- ATL – Haskel Stanback – 19 rushes, 77 yards

**Top receivers**

- CHI – Bo Rather – 6 receptions, 114 yards, TD
- ATL – Ken Burrow – 4 receptions, 76 yards

==== Week 6: vs. New Orleans Saints ====
Week 6: New Orleans Saints at Atlanta Falcons – Game summary

Quarter	1	2	3	4	Total
**Saints**	0	10	3	0	**13**
Falcons	0	3	0	0	**3**

at Atlanta Stadium, Atlanta, Georgia

- Date: October 20
- Game time: 1:00 p.m. EDT
- Game weather: Sunny, 52 °F (11 °C)
- Game attendance: 47,217
- Box score

Game information

**First quarter**

- No scoring plays

**Second quarter**

- ATL – Nick Mike-Mayer 47-yard field goal. Falcons 3–0.
- NO – Paul Seal 36-yard pass from Bobby Scott (Bill McClard kick). Saints 7–3.
- NO – Bill McClard 41-yard field goal. Saints 10–3.

**Third quarter**

- NO – Bill McClard 31-yard field goal. Saints 13–3.

**Fourth quarter**

- No scoring plays

**Top passers**

- NO – Bobby Scott – 6/16, 78 yards, TD, INT
- ATL – Pat Sullivan – 12/24, 122 yards, INT

**Top rushers**

- NO – Alvin Maxson – 25 rushes, 91 yards
- ATL – Dave Hampton – 12 rushes, 37 yards

**Top receivers**

- NO – Paul Seal – 1 reception, 36 yards, TD
- ATL – Jim Mitchell – 4 receptions, 45 yards

==== Week 7: at Pittsburgh Steelers ====
Week 7: Atlanta Falcons at Pittsburgh Steelers – Game summary

Quarter	1	2	3	4	Total
Falcons	0	14	0	3	**17**
**Steelers**	14	0	3	7	**24**

at Three Rivers Stadium, Pittsburgh, Pennsylvania

- Date: October 28
- Game time: 9:00 p.m. EST
- Game weather: Clear, 51 °F (11 °C)
- Game attendance: 48,094
- TV announcers (ABC): Frank Gifford and Howard Cosell
- Box score

Game information

**First quarter**

- PIT – Rocky Bleier 10-yard run (Roy Gerela kick). Steelers 7–0.
- PIT – Terry Bradshaw 1-yard run (Roy Gerela kick). Steelers 14–0.

**Second quarter**

- ATL – Al Dodd 9-yard pass from Bob Lee (Nick Mike-Mayer kick). Steelers 14–7.
- ATL – Ken Burrow 24-yard pass from Bob Lee (Nick Mike-Mayer kick). Tied 14–14.

**Third quarter**

- PIT – Roy Gerela 33-yard field goal. Steelers 17–14.

**Fourth quarter**

- PIT – Franco Harris 7-yard run (Roy Gerela kick). Steelers 24–14.
- ATL – Nick Mike-Mayer 32-yard field goal. Steelers 24–17.

**Top passers**

- ATL – Bob Lee – 8/20, 122 yards, 2 TD, 2 INT
- PIT – Terry Bradshaw – 9/21, 130 yards, 2 INT

**Top rushers**

- ATL – Dave Hampton – 17 rushes, 55 yards
- PIT – Franco Harris – 28 rushes, 141 yards, TD

**Top receivers**

- ATL – Jim Mitchell – 2 receptions, 62 yards
- PIT – Franco Harris – 2 receptions, 37 yards

==== Week 8: at Miami Dolphins ====
Week 8: Atlanta Falcons at Miami Dolphins – Game summary

Quarter	1	2	3	4	Total
Falcons	0	7	0	0	**7**
**Dolphins**	0	14	21	7	**42**

at Miami Orange Bowl, Miami, Florida

- Date: November 3
- Game time: 4:00 p.m. EST
- Game weather: Partly cloudy, 77 °F (25 °C)
- Game attendance: 64,399
- Box score

Game information

**First quarter**

- No scoring plays

**Second quarter**

- MIA – Benny Malone 4-yard run (Garo Yepremian kick). Dolphins 7–0.
- MIA – Paul Warfield 4-yard pass from Bob Griese (Garo Yepremian kick). Dolphins 14–0.
- ATL – Dave Hampton 2-yard run (Nick Mike-Mayer kick). Dolphins 14–7.

**Third quarter**

- MIA – Don Nottingham 1-yard run (Garo Yepremian kick). Dolphins 21–7.
- MIA – Jim Mandich 18-yard pass from Bob Griese (Garo Yepremian kick). Dolphins 28–7.
- MIA – Don Nottingham 2-yard run (Garo Yepremian kick). Dolphins 35–7.

**Fourth quarter**

- MIA – Don Nottingham 1-yard (Garo Yepremian kick). Dolphins 42–7.

**Top passers**

- ATL – Bob Lee – 8/15, 65 yards, INT
- MIA – Bob Griese – 10/15, 158 yards, 2 TD, INT

**Top rushers**

- ATL – Dave Hampton – 14 rushes, 71 yards, TD
- MIA – Benny Malone – 24 rushes, 108 yards, TD

**Top receivers**

- ATL – Ken Burrow – 3 receptions, 47 yards
- MIA – Paul Warfield – 4 receptions, 71 yards, TD

==== Week 9: at Los Angeles Rams ====
Week 9: Atlanta Falcons at Los Angeles Rams – Game summary

Quarter	1	2	3	4	Total
Falcons	0	0	0	0	**0**
**Rams**	7	0	7	7	**21**

at Los Angeles Memorial Coliseum, Los Angeles, California

- Date: November 10
- Game time: 4:00 p.m. EST/1:00 p.m. PST
- Game weather: Sunny, 65 °F (18 °C)
- Game attendance: 70,056
- Box score

Game information

**First quarter**

- LAR – Harold Jackson 40-yard pass from James Harris (David Ray kick). Rams 7–0.

**Second quarter**

- No scoring plays

**Third quarter**

- LAR – Tony Baker 1-yard run (David Ray kick). Rams 14–0.

**Fourth quarter**

- LAR – Harold Jackson 25-yard pass from James Harris (David Ray kick). Rams 21–0.

**Top passers**

- ATL – Bob Lee – 10/21, 89 yards
- LAR – James Harris – 5/13, 130 yards, 2 TD, INT

**Top rushers**

- ATL – Art Malone – 13 rushes, 49 yards
- LAR – Lawrence McCutcheon – 22 rushes, 140 yards

**Top receivers**

- ATL – Art Malone – 6 receptions, 33 yards
- LAR – Harold Jackson – 3 receptions, 79 yards, 2 TD

==== Week 10: vs. Baltimore Colts ====
Week 10: Baltimore Colts at Atlanta Falcons – Game summary

Quarter	1	2	3	4	Total
**Colts**	0	10	0	7	**17**
Falcons	0	7	0	0	**7**

at Atlanta Stadium, Atlanta, Georgia

- Date: November 17
- Game time: 1:00 p.m. EST
- Game weather: Partly cloudy, 54 °F (12 °C)
- Game attendance: 41,278
- Box score

Game information

**First quarter**

- No scoring plays

**Second quarter**

- BAL – Toni Linhart 37-yard field goal. Colts 3–0.
- ATL – Haskel Stanback 23-yard run (Nick Mike-Mayer kick). Falcons 7–3.
- BAL – Marty Domres 12-yard run (Toni Linhart kick). Colts 10–7.

**Third quarter**

- No scoring plays

**Fourth quarter**

- BAL – Bill Olds 1-yard run (Toni Linhart kick). Colts 17–7.

**Top passers**

- BAL – Marty Domres – 4/11, 74 yards, INT
- ATL – Bob Lee – 12/22, 142 yards, INT

**Top rushers**

- BAL – Lydell Mitchell – 33 rushes, 151 yards
- ATL – Dave Hampton – 16 rushes, 62 yards

**Top receivers**

- BAL – Raymond Chester – 1 reception, 41 yards
- ATL – Jim Mitchell – 2 receptions, 45 yards

==== Week 11: at San Francisco 49ers ====
Week 11: Atlanta Falcons at San Francisco 49ers – Game summary

Quarter	1	2	3	4	Total
Falcons	0	0	0	0	**0**
**49ers**	7	7	0	13	**27**

at Candlestick Park, San Francisco, California

- Date: November 24
- Game time: 4:00 p.m. EST/1:00 p.m. PST
- Game weather: Cloudy, 50 °F (10 °C)
- Game attendance: 45,435
- Box score

Game information

**First quarter**

- SF – Gene Washington 5-yard pass from Tom Owen (Bruce Gossett kick). 49ers 7–0.

**Second quarter**

- SF – Gene Washington 53-yard pass from Tom Owen (Bruce Gossett kick). 49ers 14–0.

**Third quarter**

- No scoring plays

**Fourth quarter**

- SF – Manfred Moore 88-yard punt return (Bruce Gossett kick). 49ers 21–0.
- SF – Bruce Gossett 20-yard field goal. 49ers 24–0.
- SF – Bruce Gossett 42-yard field goal. 49ers 27–0.

**Top passers**

- ATL – Pat Sullivan – 13/30, 148 yards, 2 INT
- SF – Tom Owen – 7/16, 127 yards, 2 TD, INT

**Top rushers**

- ATL – Dave Hampton – 10 rushes, 43 yards
- SF – Larry Schreiber – 20 rushes, 106 yards

**Top receivers**

- ATL – Dave Hampton – 4 receptions, 37 yards
- SF – Gene Washington – 2 receptions, 58 yards, 2 TD

==== Week 12: vs. Los Angeles Rams ====
Week 12: Los Angeles Rams at Atlanta Falcons – Game summary

Quarter	1	2	3	4	Total
**Rams**	6	7	17	0	**30**
Falcons	0	7	0	0	**7**

at Atlanta Stadium, Atlanta, Georgia

- Date: December 1
- Game time: 4:00 p.m. EST
- Game weather: Rain, 36 °F (2 °C)
- Game attendance: 18,648
- Box score

Game information

**First quarter**

- LAR – Jim Bertelsen 6-yard run (kick failed). Rams 6–0.

**Second quarter**

- LAR – Jack Snow 44-yard pass from James Harris (David Ray). Rams 13–0.
- ATL – Vince Kendrick 2-yard pass from Pat Sullivan (Nick Mike-Mayer kick). Rams 13–7.

**Third quarter**

- LAR – Dave Elmendorf 57-yard interception return (David Ray kick). Rams 20–7.
- LAR – Jim Bertelsen 4-yard run (David Ray kick). Rams 27–7.
- LAR – David Ray 23-yard field goal. Rams 30–7.

**Fourth quarter**

- No scoring plays

**Top passers**

- LAR – James Harris – 9/17, 174 yards, TD
- ATL – Kim McQuilken – 13/27, 160 yards, 3 INT

**Top rushers**

- LAR – Lawrence McCutcheon – 16 rushes, 53 yards
- ATL – Art Malone – 4 rushes, 9 yards

**Top receivers**

- LAR – Jack Snow – 2 receptions, 85 yards, TD
- ATL – Jim Mitchell – 7 receptions, 109 yards

==== Week 13: at Minnesota Vikings ====
Week 13: Atlanta Falcons at Minnesota Vikings – Game summary

Quarter	1	2	3	4	Total
Falcons	0	7	0	3	**10**
**Vikings**	7	3	6	7	**23**

at Metropolitan Stadium, Bloomington, Minnesota

- Date: December 7
- Game time: 1:00 p.m. EST/12:00 p.m. CST
- Game weather: Cloudy with flurries, 28 °F (−2 °C)
- Game attendance: 47,105
- Box score

Game information

**First quarter**

- MIN – Dave Osborn 10-yard run (Fred Cox kick). Vikings 7–0.

**Second quarter**

- ATL – Art Malone 1-yard run (Nick Mike-Mayer kick). Tied 7–7.
- MIN – Fred Cox 21-yard field goal. Vikings 10–7.

**Third quarter**

- MIN – Dave Osborn 5-yard run (kick failed). Vikings 16–7.

**Fourth quarter**

- ATL – Nick Mike-Mayer 36-yard field goal. Vikings 16–10.
- MIN – Stu Voigt 10-yard pass from Bob Berry (Fred Cox kick). Vikings 23–10.

**Top passers**

- ATL – Kim McQuilken – 11/25, 125 yards, 2 INT
- MIN – Bob Berry – 14/22, 114 yards, TD, INT

**Top rushers**

- ATL – Art Malone – 10 rushes, 54 yards, TD
- MIN – Dave Osborn – 24 rushes, 96 yards, 2 TD

**Top receivers**

- ATL – Ken Burrow – 3 receptions, 50 yards
- MIN – Dave Osborn – 6 receptions, 39 yards

==== Week 14: vs. Green Bay Packers ====
Week 14: Green Bay Packers at Atlanta Falcons – Game summary

Quarter	1	2	3	4	Total
Packers	0	0	3	0	**3**
**Falcons**	7	3	0	0	**10**

at Atlanta Stadium, Atlanta, Georgia

- Date: December 15
- Game time: 1:00 p.m. EST
- Game weather: Cloudy, 42 °F (6 °C)
- Game attendance: 10,020
- Box score

Game information

**First quarter**

- ATL – Dave Hampton 5-yard run (Nick Mike-Mayer kick). Falcons 7–0.

**Second quarter**

- ATL – Nick Mike-Mayer 47-yard field goal. Falcons 10–0.

**Third quarter**

- GB – Chester Marcol 43-yard field goal. Falcons 10–3.

**Fourth quarter**

- No scoring plays

**Top passers**

- GB – John Hadl – 15/38, 138 yards, 2 INT
- ATL – Kim McQuilken – 7/20, 68 yards, 3 INT

**Top rushers**

- GB – John Brockington – 20 rushes, 65 yards
- ATL – Dave Hampton – 23 rushes, 94 yards, TD

**Top receivers**

- GB – Rich McGeorge – 2 receptions, 38 yards
- ATL – Tom Geredine – 2 receptions, 27 yards

=== Standings ===
NFC West
	W	L	T	PCT	DIV	CONF	PF	PA	STK
Los Angeles Rams	10	4	0	.714	5–1	7–3	263	181	W1
San Francisco 49ers	6	8	0	.429	4–2	6–5	226	236	W2
New Orleans Saints	5	9	0	.357	3–3	5–6	166	263	L1
Atlanta Falcons	3	11	0	.214	0–6	3–8	111	271	W1
