= 1973 Atlanta Falcons season =

NFL team season

- Owner: Rankin M. Smith Sr.
- General manager: Norm Van Brocklin
- Head coach: Norm Van Brocklin
- Home stadium: Atlanta Stadium

Results
- Record: 9–5
- Division place: 2nd NFC West
- Playoffs: Did not qualify

The 1973 Atlanta Falcons season was the franchise's eighth year in the National Football League (NFL). The team improved on their previous season's output of 7–7 and achieved their best record until 1980, but failed to reach a maiden playoff berth.

Atlanta opened the season with a massive 62-7 victory at New Orleans led by five interceptions of Archie Manning and 13 completions in 15 attempts with 3 touchdowns by Dick Shiner, who was the first quarterback in NFL history to be officially credited with a perfect 158.3 passer rating. He was relieved by Bob Lee in the second half. After this explosive showing, the Falcons lost three straight without scoring any touchdowns. Then Lee took over as starter and completed 11 of 13 passes with his own perfect 158.3 rating in a 46-6 blowout of Chicago. This sparked a seven-game winning streak which included defeating the Vikings when that team was 9–0 and looking at emulating the previous season‘s Dolphins’ perfect season.

Despite entering the last month of the regular season at 8–3, they were upset by the Buffalo Bills, forcing them into a race with the Washington Redskins for the wild card playoff spot. The NFL's tiebreaker format at the time, which favored teams with the best combined scoring offense and defense, necessitated a blowout win over a Cardinals team that had won only one of its last ten and was playing an unknown quarterback, Gary Keithley. However, while Keithley completed only ten of 32 passes (he and Lee recorded a 0.0 passer rating in the game), the Falcons were instead blown out 32–10 at home courtesy of an unexpected Cardinals rushing game and six field goals from Jim Bakken. Although the Falcons won the regular season finale to end the season at 9–5, Washington also won and qualified as the wild card with a 10–4 record.

Despite the Falcons’ success between 2008 and 2012, the win over the Vikings was the last time the Falcons defeated the last unbeaten NFL team until they defeated the 14–0 Carolina Panthers in week 16 of the 2015 season.

== Offseason ==
=== NFL draft ===
1973 Atlanta Falcons draft
Round	Pick	Player	Position	College	Notes
2	39	Greg Marx	Defensive end	Notre Dame	
4	94	Tom Geredine	Wide receiver	Northeast Missouri State	
6	142	Nick Bebout	Offensive tackle	Wyoming	
7	170	Tommy Campbell	Cornerback	Iowa State	
8	195	Tom Reed	Guard	Arkansas	
9	220	Russell Ingram	Center	Texas Tech	
10	248	Nick Mike-Mayer *	Kicker	Temple	
11	273	Byron Buelow	Defensive back	Wisconsin–La Crosse	
12	298	Mike Samples	Linebacker	Drake	
13	326	Chris Stecher	Offensive tackle	Claremont-Mudd	
14	351	John Madeya	Quarterback	Louisville	
15	376	Thomas Gage	Defensive back	Lamar	
16	404	Rufus Ferguson	Running back	Wisconsin	
17	428	Jim Hodge	Wide receiver	Arkansas	
Made roster * Made at least one Pro Bowl during career

== Personnel ==
=== Staff ===
1973 Atlanta Falcons staff
Front office: Chairman of the board – Rankin M. Smith Sr.; President – Frank E. Wall; General manager – Norm Van Brocklin; Head coaches: Head coach – Norm Van Brocklin; Offensive coaches: Offensive backfield – Billy Ray Barnes; Receivers – Harry Gilmer; Offensive line – Duane Putnam	Defensive coaches: Head defensive – Marion Campbell; Defensive line – Bob Griffin; Defensive backfield – Fred Bruney

=== Roster ===
1973 Atlanta Falcons roster
Quarterbacks (QB): 19 Bob Lee; 9 John Madeya; 7 Pat Sullivan; Running backs (RB): 43 Dave Hampton; 25 Art Malone; 33 Henry Matthews; 44 Eddie Ray; 5 Harmon Wages; 30 Joe Washington; Wide receivers (WR): 41 Al Dodd; 84 Tom Geredine; 80 Louis Neal; Tight ends (TE): 83 Larry Mialik; 86 Jim Mitchell	Offensive linemen (OL): 63 Nick Bebout T; 68 Ted Fritsch C; 65 Len Gotshalk T; 56 Dennis Havig G; 75 George Kunz T; 64 Andy Maurer G; 61 Bill Sandeman T; 57 Jeff Van Note C; Defensive linemen (DL): 87 Claude Humphrey DE; 69 Mike Lewis DT; 77 Rosie Manning DT; 78 Greg Marx DE; 74 Mike Tilleman DT; 79 Chuck Walker DT; 71 John Zook DE	Linebackers (LB): 51 Duane Benson OLB; 50 Greg Brezina OLB; 58 Don Hansen OLB; 52 Ken Mitchell OLB; 60 Tommy Nobis MLB; 59 Lonnie Warwick MLB; Defensive backs (DB): 34 Ray Brown SS; 32 Ray Easterling FS; 29 Clarence Ellis FS; 27 Tom Hayes CB; 22 Rolland Lawrence CB; 35 Tony Plummer SS; 36 Ken Reaves CB; Special teams (ST): 6 John James P; 12 Nick Mike-Mayer K	Practice squad: 40 Don Highsmith RB; 77 Rosie Manning DT; Reserve: 82 Ken Burrow WR (IR); 55 Jim Miller G (IR); 89 Harry Sovio TE (IR); Rookies in italics

== Schedule ==
Week	Date	Opponent	Result	Record	Venue	Attendance
1	September 16	at **New Orleans Saints**	**W** 62–7	1–0	Tulane Stadium	66,428
2	September 23	at **Los Angeles Rams**	**L** 0–31	1–1	Los Angeles Memorial Coliseum	61,197
3	October 1	at Detroit Lions	**L** 6–31	1–2	Tiger Stadium	45,599
4	October 7	**San Francisco 49ers**	**L** 9–13	1–3	Atlanta Stadium	51,107
5	October 14	Chicago Bears	**W** 46–6	2–3	Atlanta Stadium	58,850
6	October 21	at San Diego Chargers	**W** 41–0	3–3	San Diego Stadium	41,527
7	October 28	at **San Francisco 49ers**	**W** 17–3	4–3	Candlestick Park	56,825
8	November 4	**Los Angeles Rams**	**W** 15–13	5–3	Atlanta Stadium	55,837
9	November 11	at Philadelphia Eagles	**W** 44–27	6–3	Veterans Stadium	63,114
10	November 19	Minnesota Vikings	**W** 20–14	7–3	Atlanta Stadium	56,519
11	November 25	at New York Jets	**W** 28–20	8–3	Shea Stadium	47,283
12	December 2	Buffalo Bills	**L** 6–17	8–4	Atlanta Stadium	54,607
13	December 9	St. Louis Cardinals	**L** 10–32	8–5	Atlanta Stadium	48,030
14	December 16	**New Orleans Saints**	**W** 14–10	9–5	Atlanta Stadium	34,147
Note: Intra-division opponents are in **bold** text.

=== Standings ===
NFC West
	W	L	T	PCT	DIV	CONF	PF	PA	STK
Los Angeles Rams	12	2	0	.857	5–1	9–2	388	178	W6
Atlanta Falcons	9	5	0	.643	4–2	7–4	318	224	W1
San Francisco 49ers	5	9	0	.357	2–4	4–7	262	319	L2
New Orleans Saints	5	9	0	.357	1–5	4–7	163	312	L1
