= 1972 Atlanta Falcons season =

NFL team season

- Media guide for the 1972 Atlanta Falcons, featuring quarterback Bob Berry and star right tackle George Kunz.
- Owner: Rankin M. Smith Sr.
- General manager: Norm Van Brocklin
- Head coach: Norm Van Brocklin
- Home stadium: Atlanta Stadium

Results
- Record: 7–7
- Division place: 2nd NFC West
- Playoffs: Did not qualify
- Pro Bowlers: T George Kunz; TE Jim R. Mitchell; DE Claude Humphrey; LB Tommy Nobis

The 1972 Atlanta Falcons season was the franchise's seventh year in the National Football League (NFL). The team failed to improve on their previous season's output of 7–6–1, finishing 7–7 and failing to reach the playoffs. Standing at 7–5 the Falcons traveled to San Francisco with the NFC West division title on the line. However, the Falcons were never in the game and saw their playoff hopes dim with a 20–0 shutout loss. Facing the Kansas City Chiefs in their final game of the season, Running Back Dave Hampton surpassed the 1,000-yard mark. However, a play later he was thrown for a six-yard loss to end the season with 995 yards, as the Falcons lost and finished 7–7.

== Offseason ==
=== NFL draft ===
1972 Atlanta Falcons draft
Round	Pick	Player	Position	College	Notes
1	15	Clarence Ellis	Safety	Notre Dame	
2	40	Pat Sullivan	Quarterback	Auburn	
2	41	Steve Okoniewski	Defensive tackle	Montana	
2	42	Rosie Manning	Defensive tackle	Northeastern State	
3	67	Les Goodman	Running back	Yankton	
Made roster

== Personnel ==
=== Staff ===
1972 Atlanta Falcons staff
Front office: Chairman of the board – Rankin M. Smith Sr.; President – Frank E. Wall; General manager – Norm Van Brocklin; Head coaches: Head coach – Norm Van Brocklin; Offensive coaches: Offensive backfield – Billy Ray Barnes; Receivers – Harry Gilmer; Offensive line – Duane Putnam	Defensive coaches: Head defensive – Marion Campbell; Defensive line – Bob Griffin; Defensive backfield – Fred Bruney

=== Roster ===
1972 Atlanta Falcons roster
Quarterbacks (QB): 17 Bob Berry; 7 Pat Sullivan; Running backs (RB): 28 Willie Belton; 43 Dave Hampton; 25 Art Malone; 23 Joe Profit; 44 Eddie Ray; Wide receivers (WR): 82 Ken Burrow; 81 Wes Chesson; 45 Ray Jarvis; 80 Todd Snyder; Tight ends (TE): 83 Larry Mialik; 86 Jim Mitchell	Offensive linemen (OL): 68 Ted Fritsch C; 65 Len Gotshalk T; 56 Dennis Havig G; 75 George Kunz T; 64 Andy Maurer G; 61 Bill Sandeman T; 57 Jeff Van Note C; Defensive linemen (DL): 88 Glen Condren DT; 87 Claude Humphrey DE; 69 Mike Lewis DT; 66 John Small DT; 79 Chuck Walker DT; 71 John Zook DE	Linebackers (LB): 54 Grady Allen OLB; 51 Duane Benson OLB; 50 Greg Brezina OLB; 58 Don Hansen OLB; 60 Tommy Nobis MLB; Defensive backs (DB): 34 Ray Brown SS; 32 Ray Easterling CB; 29 Clarence Ellis FS; 31 Willie Germany FS; 27 Tom Hayes CB; 35 Tony Plummer SS; 36 Ken Reaves CB; Special teams (ST): 37 Bill Bell K; 6 John James P	Practice squad: 59 Noel Jenke LB; 72 Mel Lunsford DE; 77 Rosie Manning DT; 52 Ken Mitchell LB; 11 Dick Shiner QB; 89 Henry Sovio TE; Reserve: 55 Jim Miller G (IR); 5 Harmon Wages RB (IR); Rookies in italics

== Schedule ==
Week	Date	Opponent	Result	Record	Venue	Attendance
1	September 17	at Chicago Bears	**W** 37–21	1–0	Soldier Field	55,701
2	September 24	at New England Patriots	**L** 20–21	1–1	Schaefer Stadium	60,999
3	October 1	**Los Angeles Rams**	**W** 31–3	2–1	Atlanta Stadium	57,122
4	October 8	Detroit Lions	**L** 23–26	2–2	Atlanta Stadium	58,850
5	October 15	at **New Orleans Saints**	**W** 21–14	3–2	Tulane Stadium	66,294
6	October 22	at Green Bay Packers	**W** 10–9	4–2	Milwaukee County Stadium	47,967
7	October 29	**San Francisco 49ers**	**L** 14–49	4–3	Atlanta Stadium	58,850
8	November 5	at **Los Angeles Rams**	**L** 7–20	4–4	Los Angeles Memorial Coliseum	75,018
9	November 12	**New Orleans Saints**	**W** 36–20	5–4	Atlanta Stadium	58,850
10	November 20	at Washington Redskins	**L** 13–24	5–5	RFK Stadium	53,034
11	November 26	Denver Broncos	**W** 23–20	6–5	Atlanta Stadium	58,850
12	December 3	Houston Oilers	**W** 20–10	7–5	Atlanta Stadium	58,850
13	December 10	at **San Francisco 49ers**	**L** 0–20	7–6	Candlestick Park	61,214
14	December 17	Kansas City Chiefs	**L** 14–17	7–7	Atlanta Stadium	58,850
Note: Intra-division opponents are in **bold** text.

=== Standings ===
NFC West
	W	L	T	PCT	DIV	CONF	PF	PA	STK
San Francisco 49ers	8	5	1	.607	3–2–1	6–4–1	353	249	W2
Atlanta Falcons	7	7	0	.500	3–3	5–5	269	274	L2
Los Angeles Rams	6	7	1	.464	4–2	5–5–1	291	286	L2
New Orleans Saints	2	11	1	.179	1–4–1	2–8–1	215	361	L3
