= Dave Hampton =

American football player (born 1947)

No. 25, 43, 34
- Position: Running back

Personal information
- Born: May 7, 1947 (age 79); Akron, Ohio, U.S.
- Listed height: 6 ft 0 in (1.83 m)
- Listed weight: 210 lb (95 kg)

Career information
- High school: Ann Arbor (MI)
- College: Wyoming
- NFL draft: 1969: 9th round, 220th overall pick

Career history
- Green Bay Packers (1969–1971); Atlanta Falcons (1972–1976); Philadelphia Eagles (1976)

Awards and highlights
- NFL Comeback Player of the Year (1975); NFL kickoff return yards leader (1971)

Career NFL statistics
- Rushing yards: 4,536
- Rushing average: 4
- Receptions: 119
- Receiving yards: 1,156
- Return yards: 2,923
- Total touchdowns: 34
- Stats at Pro Football Reference

David Hampton (born May 7, 1947) is an American former professional football player who was a running back and return specialist in the National Football League (NFL) for the Green Bay Packers, Atlanta Falcons, and Philadelphia Eagles. He played college football for the Wyoming Cowboys. In 2026, he was selected to the University of Wyoming Intercollegiate Athletics Hall of Fame.

Hampton was the first player in Atlanta Falcons' history to finish a season with over 1,000 rushing yards (1975). In 1972 he led the NFL in all-purpose yards, and was the Falcon's most valuable player in his first season with the team. He led the Falcons in rushing every season from 1972 through 1975. In 1975, he was the NFL's Comeback Player of the Year. He ran a kickoff back for a touchdown in each of his first three seasons with the Green Bay Packers. For a 14-game season, Hampton's 1,314 kickoff return yards in 1971 as a Packer is second only to Bobby Jancik's record of 1,317 return yards for the 1963 Houston Oilers in the American Football League.

== Early life ==
Hampton was born on May 7, 1947, in Akron, Ohio. He attended Ann Arbor High School, in Ann Arbor, Michigan, graduating in 1965. He played on the Ann Arbor Pioneers football and basketball teams. In 1964 as a senior, the 5 ft 11 in (1.8 m) 180 lb (81.7 kg) Hampton was named All-Six-A League as a running back. Hampton was All-City and second-team All-State in football. He was a guard on the school's basketball team in 1964–65 that won the Six-A League title.

== College career ==
Hampton attended the University of Wyoming, where he played on the Wyoming Cowboys football team in the Western Athletic Conference (WAC). During his sophomore and junior years, he played both offense and defense, as well as returning kickoffs. As a running back, he was used more as a blocking back than primary runner during these two years.

As a sophomore running back in 1966, he rushed for 384 yards in 88 carries, with three rushing touchdowns. He was second on the team in rushing to junior running back Jim Kiick (597 yards), a future NFL running back like Hampton; who won two Super Bowls with the Miami Dolphins. Among others, the 1966 Cowboys' backfield also included future NFL player Vic Washington, who helped lead the San Francisco 49ers to the playoffs from 1970 to 1972. The 1966 Cowboys team finished the season 10–1, and were WAC champions. The Cowboys defeated Florida State University in the Sun Bowl, 28–20. Hampton rushed for 16 yards on six carries, and Kiick was the game's most valuable player. The Associated Press (AP) ranked Wyoming as high as No. 10 during the season that year.

In 1967, Wyoming again finished 10–1 and won the WAC. They ended the season ranked No. 6 by the AP. Hampton had only 148 yards rushing and a 2.8 yards per carry average that year, with two rushing touchdowns. He also had a receiving touchdown that season. Kiick was again the team's leading rusher. The only game Wyoming lost that year was in the January 1, 1968 Sugar Bowl to Louisiana State University, 20–13. The Cowboys had a 13–0 lead at halftime, but the Tigers came back to win the game.

Hampton's breakout season with the Cowboys came in 1968, leading the team with 749 rushing yards, a 5.5 yards per carry average and eight rushing touchdowns. He also had nine receptions for 100 yards and two receiving touchdowns. In a November game against the University of Texas at El Paso, Hampton had 157 yards rushing and two rushing touchdowns, in a 26–19 win for Wyoming. Wyoming had a 7–3 record, and won the WAC for a third consecutive season. Hampton was third in the WAC in rushing yards, second in yards per carry, and tied for second in total touchdowns.

== Professional career ==
=== Green Bay Packers ===
Hampton was selected by the Green Bay Packers in the ninth round of the 1969 NFL/AFL draft, 220th overall, in late January, in what turned out to be general manager Vince Lombardi's last official function with the club before becoming coach and general manager of the Washington Redskins the next week.

Under head coach Vince Lombardi, the Packers had built their championship teams of the 1960s upon a running attack led by Hall of Fame halfback Paul Hornung and Hall of Fame fullback Jim Taylor. Hornung and Taylor were traded to the New Orleans Saints after the 1966 season, and the Packers won their fifth and final championship of the 1960s after the 1967 season. In 1968, the Packers focused on passing the ball more than running, finishing the season with a losing record, under general manager Lombardi and new coach Phil Bengston. The team intended to run the ball more in 1969, Hampton's rookie season. Hampton went on to lead the Packers in yards per carry average that season, and was named the team's rookie of the year by the Wisconsin chapter of the Pro Football Writers of America.

In 1969, the leading rushers on the Packers were Travis Williams (536 yards), Hampton (365 yards), Donny Anderson (288 yards) and Jim Grabowski (261 yards), on a team that finished 8–6 under Bengston. Hampton was the team's second leading rusher, even though he did not start any games. In an October 12 game against the Detroit Lions, Hampton made an extraordinary and critical 50-yard reception of a Bart Starr pass, and then scored a touchdown on the next play on a one-yard run, helping to secure a Packers' win. Along with Williams, Hampton also served as a Packers' kickoff returner that season. Hampton led the team with 22 kickoff returns for 582 yards (26.5 yards per return). In the season's second game, Hampton returned a kickoff 87 yards for a touchdown, against the San Francisco 49ers.

Hampton missed the majority of the 1970 season, playing in only six games. In the third game of the season, on October 4, he returned a kickoff 101 yards for a touchdown against the Minnesota Vikings. Hampton had suffered a blow to his abdominal region during the Packers' final preseason game on September 13 against the Buffalo Bills (Hampton leading the Packers in rushing with 69 yards in that 34–0 win). The injury did not cause him significant pain again until very shortly after his touchdown return against the Vikings weeks later, while catching his breath on the sidelines. Two days later he had surgery for a pelvic abscess, in which a segment of his bowel was also removed. A second abscess had to be removed later.

Hampton lost 20 pounds after these surgeries. He regained enough weight and strength, however, that he returned to start on December 6 against the Pittsburgh Steelers, rushing 15 times for 53 yards. Hampton started again the following week, gaining 34 yards on 20 carries. He did not start the season's final game, but did carry the ball seven times, for only 12 yards.

Hampton remained a reserve running back in 1971, playing behind Donny Anderson. He started one of the 13 games in which he appeared. He had 302 yards on 67 carries, with three rushing touchdowns. He also had a touchdown reception that year. Packers' head coach Dan Devine reportedly said after the season that the decision to start Anderson over Hampton had been unfair on Devine's part.

Hampton was the Packers' primary kickoff returner that season, with 46 returns for 1,314 yards, leading the NFL in both categories. His 28.6 yards per return was second in the NFL to Travis Williams (now with the Los Angeles Rams). In a November 28 game against the New Orleans Saints, he returned a kickoff 90 yards for a touchdown.

=== Atlanta Falcons ===
The Packers traded Anderson for running back MacArthur Lane before the 1972 season, and intended to start Lane ahead of Hampton. In early September 1972, the Packers traded Hampton to the Atlanta Falcons for starting offensive tackle Malcolm Snider. In three seasons with the Packers as a running back, Hampton started three games with 787 total rushing yards in 195 attempts. The Falcons made Hampton a starter in 1972, and in 11 starts that season he had 995 yards on 230 carries, with six rushing touchdowns. He had 23 receptions for 244 yards and a receiving touchdown, and returned 25 kickoffs for 535 yards that season. Hampton led the NFL in all-purpose yards (1,780). Hampton did all of this while playing injured during much of the season.

In Hampton's third game as a Falcon, against the Los Angeles Rams, he rushed for 161 yards on 29 carries (both Falcons' records at the time), with two rushing touchdowns; including a 56-yard touchdown run. The Associated Press named him its Offensive Player of the Week in the NFL for his performance in that game.

==== Losing 1,000-yard season ====
The Falcons played their final game of the 1972 season against the Kansas City Chiefs, in Atlanta. During a halftime ceremony Hampton was presented with a trophy as the Falcon's Player of the Year. Early in the fourth quarter, Hampton surpassed the 1,000-yard rushing yard mark for the season, the first player in Falcons' history to accomplish this feat. The game was paused, and the ball was presented to Hampton. The Atlanta crowd gave him a standing ovation, and his teammates came out to shake his hand. However, the field was icy that day and on his next rushing opportunity Hampton was tackled for a five- or six-yard loss, after a poor connection between him and quarterback Bob Berry in getting the ball to Hampton. That was Hampton's last rushing attempt of the day, and Hampton ended the season with 995 total rushing yards. Although there was considerable time left in the game, the Chiefs exhausted much of the remaining time on a lengthy offensive drive, and Hampton did not get an opportunity to re-reach the 1,000 yard mark. He called it the most frustrating experience of his professional career at the time.

In 1973, Hampton had another chance to get a 1,000-yard rushing season, but he ended up three yards shy; tied for sixth best in the NFL that season. He also had 25 receptions for 273 yards and one touchdown reception. Hampton returned 11 kickoffs for 258 yards; the lowest totals of his NFL career to date. During the final game of the season, Hampton needed 15 yards with less than two minutes to play in the game to reach 1,000 yards on the season. The Falcons handed the ball to Hampton on the game's final plays, but the Saints knew this would be the case and focused solely on stopping Hampton, foregoing any concern about other offensive players. Hampton was still able to gain 12 yards, reaching 997 for the season.

Hampton had a thigh injury going into the 1974 season, and missed the first five games. Hampton came back to start in the season's sixth game, but had only 36 rushing yards. Hampton started the remaining eight games of the season. On the year, he had 464 yards on 127 carries. Even though he missed five games and suffered injury, Hampton's 464 rushing yards were a team high. The Falcons did not use him as a kickoff returner that season.

In 1975, Hampton finally achieved the 1,000-yard mark with the Falcons. He started all 14 games that season, rushing for 1,002 yards on 250 carries, with five rushing touchdowns. He also had 21 receptions for 195 yards and another touchdown. Hampton was sixth in the NFL in rushing attempts, eighth in rushing yards, and ninth in yards from scrimmage.

He went over 1,000 yards against his former team the Green Bay Packers in the last game of the season. The game was played in Green Bay at Lambeau Field. The Packers' fans cheered for Hampton to reach 1,000 yards, and gave him a standing ovation when he did so. He finally became the first Falcons running back to have 1,000 yards for an entire season. Hampton received the NFL Comeback Player of the Year Award from the Associated Press and Pro Football Weekly that season.

Hampton led the Falcons in rushing all four years he was with the team (1972 to 1975), but with their first two picks in the 1976 NFL draft, the Falcons selected running backs Bubba Bean (first round, No. 9) and Sonny Collins (second round, No. 36). Hampton felt from training camp on that season that he had to prove himself deserving to start, rather than the rookies having to do so. Hampton started the first game of the 1976, with 24 yards in 11 carries. Bean replaced him as a starter in the next game, running for 98 yards on 22 carries; with Hampton having only one rushing attempt. Hampton did not have any rushing attempts the following week, or in the fourth week of the season against the Philadelphia Eagles, played on October 3. This was his final game as a Falcon, as he was traded to the same Eagles two days later for cash and a future draft pick. He welcomed the trade, as he had come to feel like an outsider on the Falcons.

During his little over four years with the Falcons, Hampton started 49 games, with 3,482 yards in 882 carries (3.9 yards per carry), and 17 rushing touchdowns. He also caught 82 passes for 823 yards and three receiving touchdowns.

=== Philadelphia Eagles ===
Hampton was traded from the Falcons to the Philadelphia Eagles for a 1978 tenth-round pick (257th overall–Ricky Patton) and cash on October 5, 1976. In the Eagles, he was going to a team needing running backs due to injuries. He played in eight games for the Eagles that season, starting three. He rushed for 267 yards on 71 carries, with one rushing touchdown. He also had 12 receptions for 57 yards.

In Hampton's first start for the Eagles, on November 14 against the Cleveland Browns, he had his best game of the season with 94 yards on 16 carries. He had a 59-yard run in that game, the longest run from scrimmage in his career. Like the Falcons a year earlier, however, the Eagles were rebuilding with younger running backs going into the next season and released Hampton in May 1977. Hampton was then signed by Al Davis of the Oakland Raiders, but the Raiders released Hampton in August 1977, as they too were also focusing on younger rushing prospects.

== Legacy and honors ==
Hampton was the first player in Atlanta Falcons history to run for 1,000 yards in a season. He was the team's most valuable player in his first season with the Falcons. He led the Falcons in rushing from 1972 through 1975. At the time he was traded in 1976, Hampton's 3,482 rushing yards was a franchise record. He is the Falcons’ ninth all-time leader in total rushing yards (through 2025). Hampton holds the Packers all-time record for career kickoff return average, with 28.2 yards per return (through the 2025 season). His 1,314 kickoff return yards in 1971 with the Packers are three yards short of the record for return yards in a 14-game season, set by the Houston Oilers' Bobby Jancik in 1963, while playing in the American Football League. The NFL went to a 16-game season in 1978, but Jancik and Hampton were not surpassed until Buster Rhymes reached 1,345 yards in 1985 (in 15 games).

In 2026, Hampton was selected to join the University of Wyoming Intercollegiate Athletics Hall of Fame. In 2006, he was inducted into the Ann Arbor Pioneer High School Hall of Fame.

== Personal life ==
Hampton received a communications degree at Wyoming. During the offseasons in Green Bay, he worked with emotionally disturbed children. After his playing career ended, Hampton remained in Atlanta. He worked in television as a producer, director, writer and talk show host. His charitable work included providing service to the NAACP, United Way, Save the Whales and the Atlanta Zoological Society, among other entities.

== NFL career statistics ==
Legend
**Bold**	Career high

Year	Team	Games		Rushing					Receiving				
Year	Team	GP	GS	Att	Yds	Avg	Lng	TD	Rec	Yds	Avg	Lng	TD
1969	GNB	14	0	80	365	**4.6**	53	4	15	216	**14.4**	**50**	**2**
1970	GNB	6	2	48	115	2.4	14	0	7	23	3.3	12	0
1971	GNB	13	1	67	307	**4.6**	41	3	3	37	12.3	19	1
1972	ATL	13	11	230	995	4.3	56	**6**	23	244	10.6	43	1
1973	ATL	14	14	**263**	997	3.8	25	4	**25**	**273**	10.9	22	1
1974	ATL	9	9	127	464	3.7	34	2	13	111	8.5	21	0
1975	ATL	14	14	250	**1,002**	4.0	22	5	21	195	9.3	24	1
1976	ATL	2	1	12	24	2.0	10	0	0	0	0.0	0	0
1976	PHI	8	3	71	267	3.8	**59**	1	12	57	4.8	19	0
		93	55	1,148	4,536	4.0	59	25	119	1,156	9.7	50	6
