= 1971 Atlanta Falcons season =

NFL team season

- Owner: Rankin M. Smith Sr.
- General manager: Norm Van Brocklin
- Head coach: Norm Van Brocklin
- Home stadium: Atlanta Stadium

Results
- Record: 7–6–1
- Division place: 3rd NFC West
- Playoffs: Did not qualify

The 1971 Atlanta Falcons season was the franchise's sixth year in the National Football League (NFL). Finishing the season at 7-6-1, the record was the first winning season in franchise history.

== Offseason ==
=== NFL draft ===
1971 Atlanta Falcons draft
Round	Pick	Player	Position	College	Notes
1	7	Joe Profit	Running back	Northeast Louisiana	
Made roster

== Personnel ==
=== Staff ===
1971 Atlanta Falcons staff
Front office: Chairman of the board – Rankin M. Smith Sr.; President – Frank E. Wall; General manager – Norm Van Brocklin; Head coaches: Head coach – Norm Van Brocklin; Offensive coaches: Offensive backfield – Billy Ray Barnes; Receivers – Harry Gilmer; Offensive line – Duane Putnam	Defensive coaches: Head defensive – Marion Campbell; Defensive line – Bob Griffin; Defensive backfield – Fred Bruney

=== Roster ===
1971 Atlanta Falcons roster
Quarterbacks (QB): 17 Bob Berry; 10 Leo Hart; 11 Dick Shiner; Running backs (RB): 28 Willie Belton; 33 Jim Butler; 45 Sonny Campbell; 25 Art Malone; 5 Harmon Wages; Wide receivers (WR): 82 Ken Burrow; 81 Wes Chesson; 45 Ray Jarvis; 85 Ray Poage; Tight ends (TE): 84 Mike Donohoe; 86 Jim Mitchell	Offensive linemen (OL): 63 Dick Enderle G; 75 George Kunz T; 53 John Matlock C; 64 Andy Maurer G; 55 Jim Miller G; 61 Bill Sandeman T; 67 Malcolm Snider G; 57 Jeff Van Note C; Defensive linemen (DL): 88 Glen Condren DT; 87 Claude Humphrey DE; 72 Greg Lens DT; 69 Mike Lewis DT; 89 Randy Marshall DE; 66 John Small DT; 71 John Zook DE	Linebackers (LB): 52 Ron Acks OLB; 54 Grady Allen OLB; 62 John Bramlett OLB; 50 Greg Brezina OLB; 58 Don Hansen MLB; 59 Rudy Kuechenberg MLB; 51 Cleo Walker OLB; Defensive backs (DB): 34 Ray Brown FS; 27 Tom Hayes CB; 35 Tony Plummer FS; 22 John Mallory SS; 36 Ken Reaves CB; 47 Rudy Redmond SS; 30 Larry Shears CB; Special teams (ST): 37 Bill Bell K; 26 Billy Lothridge P	Practice squad: 19 Mike Brunson RB; 65 Len Gotshalk T; 56 Dennis Havig G; Reserve: 20 Tom McCauley FS (IR); 60 Tommy Nobis LB (IR); 23 Joe Profit RB (IR); 80 Todd Snyder WR (IR); Rookies in italics

== Regular season ==
=== Schedule ===
Week	Date	Opponent	Result	Record	Venue	Attendance
1	September 19	**San Francisco 49ers**	**W** 20–17	1–0	Atlanta–Fulton County Stadium	56,990
2	September 26	at **Los Angeles Rams**	**T** 20–20	1–0–1	Los Angeles Memorial Coliseum	57,895
3	October 3	at Detroit Lions	**L** 38–41	1–1–1	Tiger Stadium	54,418
4	October 10	St. Louis Cardinals	**L** 9–26	1–2–1	Atlanta Stadium	58,850
5	October 17	**Los Angeles Rams**	**L** 16–24	1–3–1	Atlanta Stadium	58,850
6	October 24	**New Orleans Saints**	**W** 28–6	2–3–1	Atlanta Stadium	58,850
7	October 31	at Cleveland Browns	**W** 31–14	3–3–1	Cleveland Municipal Stadium	76,825
8	November 7	at Cincinnati Bengals	**W** 9–6	4–3–1	Riverfront Stadium	59,604
9	November 14	New York Giants	**L** 17–21	4–4–1	Atlanta Stadium	58,850
10	November 22	Green Bay Packers	**W** 28–21	5–4–1	Atlanta Stadium	58,850
11	November 28	at Minnesota Vikings	**L** 7–24	5–5–1	Metropolitan Stadium	49,784
12	December 5	Oakland Raiders	**W** 24–13	6–5–1	Atlanta Stadium	58,850
13	December 12	at **San Francisco 49ers**	**L** 3–24	6–6–1	Kezar Stadium	44,582
14	December 19	at **New Orleans Saints**	**W** 24–20	7–6–1	Tulane Stadium	75,954
Note: Intra-division opponents are in **bold** text.

=== Standings ===
NFC West
	W	L	T	PCT	DIV	CONF	PF	PA	STK
San Francisco 49ers	9	5	0	.643	2–4	7–4	300	216	W2
Los Angeles Rams	8	5	1	.615	4–1–1	7–3–1	313	260	W1
Atlanta Falcons	7	6	1	.538	3–2–1	4–6–1	274	277	W1
New Orleans Saints	4	8	2	.333	2–4	4–7	266	347	L3

Note: Tie games were not officially counted in the standings until 1972.
