= Kim McQuilken =

American football player (born 1951)

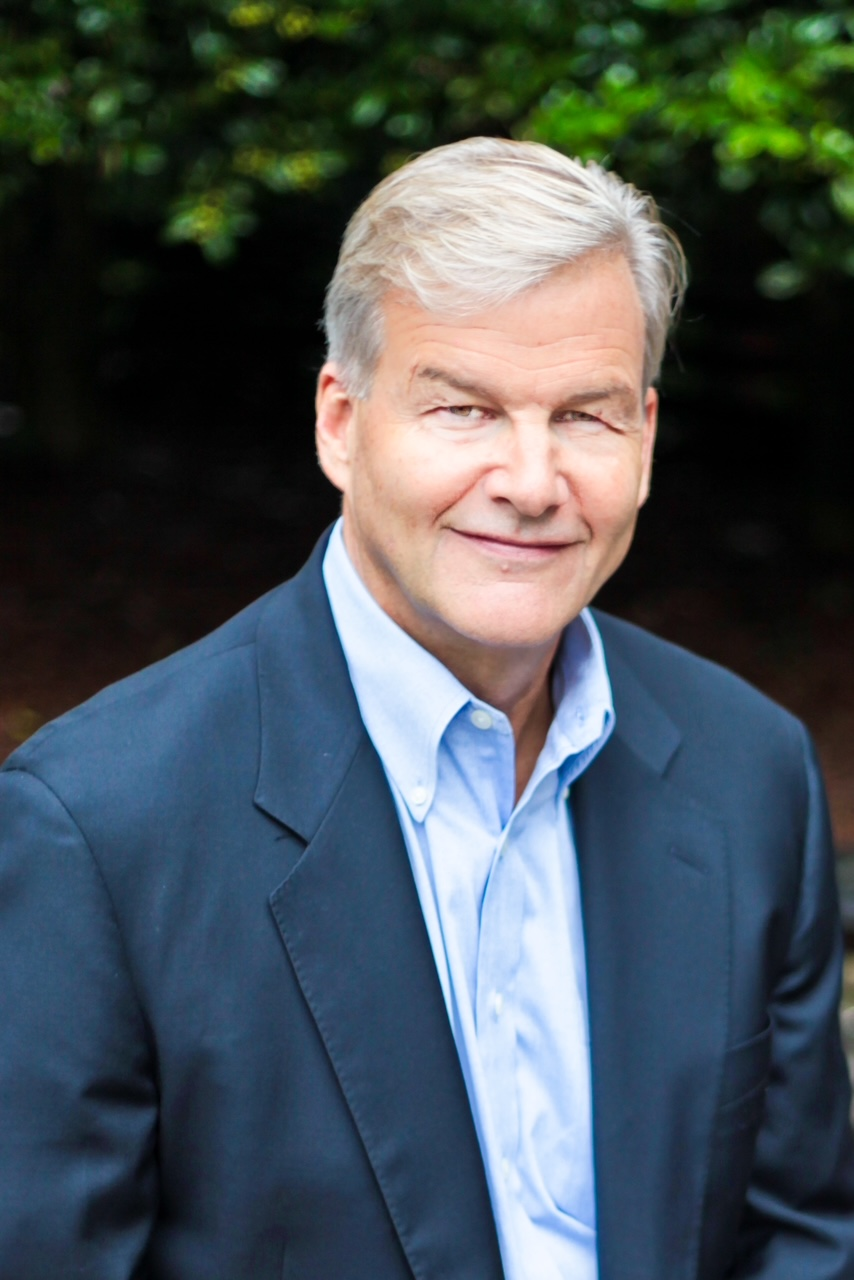

No. 11
- Position: Quarterback

Personal information
- Born: February 26, 1951 (age 75); Allentown, Pennsylvania, U.S.
- Listed height: 6 ft 2 in (1.88 m)
- Listed weight: 206 lb (93 kg)

Career information
- High school: William Allen (Allentown)
- College: Lehigh
- NFL draft: 1974: 3rd round, 69th overall pick

Career history
- Atlanta Falcons (1974–1977); Washington Redskins (1978–1980); Washington Federals (1983)

Awards and highlights
- First-team Little All-American (1973); Lehigh Athletics Hall of Fame (1995)

Career NFL statistics
- Passing attempts: 272
- Passing completions: 108
- Completion percentage: 39.7%
- TD–INT: 4–29
- Passing yards: 1,135
- Passer rating: 17.9
- Stats at Pro Football Reference

Kim McQuilken (born February 26, 1951) is an American former professional football player who was a quarterback in the National Football League (NFL) for the Atlanta Falcons and Washington Redskins and the United States Football League (USFL) with the Washington Federals. He played college football for the Lehigh Mountain Hawks. His business career includes over 20 years as a football color commentator on radio and TV and two decades as a senior sales and marketing executive with Ted Turner's Turner Broadcasting System.

== Early life ==
McQuilken was born in Allentown, Pennsylvania and attended William Allen High School. He started as quarterback during his junior and senior seasons. During his senior year, McQuilken suffered a fractured clavicle in a pre-season scrimmage and missed the first three games.

== College career ==
McQuilken was offered only one football scholarship after high school. The offer was from Lehigh University and Head Coach Fred Dunlap. Lehigh had not had a winning season in the previous 10 years. Moreover, Lehigh employed a ground offensive attack not suited to McQuilken's passing skills. But Fred Dunlap convinced McQuilken the passing game would open up if he enrolled at Lehigh. The coach was true to his word

In 1971, McQuilken's sophomore season the team posted its first winning record in over a decade going 8-3 and setting numerous offensive records. McQuilken passed for over 2,000 yards in ‘71 setting new Lehigh records for yardage, attempts, and completions. By the middle of his junior year (1972) McQuilken would own every Lehigh game, season, and career passing record. In his 1973 senior season, Lehigh went 7-3-1 and won the Lambert Cup.

Lehigh was selected as one of 16 D-LL teams invited to the first-ever NCAA D-LL national playoffs. The 1973 seniors at Lehigh graduated with a 3-0 record vs archival Lafayette College. McQuilken was the first-ever two-time winner of the game's MVP trophy.

McQuilken was named third-team All-American by the AP in 1972 and would be a consensus 1st-Team All-American in his senior year (1973) including the AP and Kodak Coaches All-American teams. He was also named the Eastern Collegiate Athletic Association (ECAC) player of the year in 1973 as well as The New York Times 1st team All-East QB (across all division levels). He was recognized as team MVP in 1973 and Lehigh University awarded McQuilken the Undergraduate Merit Award in 1974 for bringing recognition to the University. McQuilken graduated with career stats of 516 completions, 6,996 yards, and 37 touchdowns in his three years of eligibility all Lehigh records at the time. McQuilken was chosen to play in the North–South Shrine Game held annually on Christmas night in the Orange Bowl. He was also on invitation lists to the Coaches’ All-America Bowl in Lubbock, Texas, and the East-West Shrine game in San Francisco. While playing in the North–South game, McQuilken tore his MCL and declined the remaining Bowl invitations. In 1995, McQuilken was inducted into the Roger Penske/Lehigh Athletics Hall of Fame.

== Professional career ==
McQuilken was selected in the third round (69th pick) of the 1974 NFL draft by the Atlanta Falcons. He was the third quarterback chosen in the 1974 draft. He was also drafted in the second round by the Memphis Southmen of the World Football League. McQuilken ultimately signed a three-year contract with the Falcons. He was initially slotted behind starting quarterback Bob Lee and former Heisman Trophy winner Pat Sullivan with former Quarterback and Hall of Famer Norm Van Brocklin as head coach. The team got off to a 2–6 start in the 1974 season and the coach was terminated mid-season. DC Marion Campbell was named interim coach and began to work McQuilken into the rotation.

McQuilken played in five games in the 1974 season (his rookie season) including the final two as starter. With the season-ending 3–11 record, none of the Falcons QBs experienced much success. McQuilken posted no TDs vs nine interceptions while starter Bob Lee would end the season with three touchdown passes and 14 interceptions. Pat Sullivan would add three touchdowns and eight interceptions.

Out of football for three years, McQuilken joined the Washington Federals of the United States Football League in their 1983 inaugural season and emerged as their opening-day starter. Ultimately, he would complete 188-for-334 passes for 1,912 yards, seven touchdowns, and 14 interceptions for the season. However, the Feds would finish just 4–14 in front of small crowds, and the 32-year-old McQuilken retired.

=== NFL career statistics ===
Year	Team	Games			Passing								Rushing				Sacks		Fumbles	
Year	Team	GP	GS	Record	Cmp	Att	Pct	Yds	Avg	TD	Int	Rtg	Att	Yds	Avg	TD	Sck	Yds	Fum	Lost
1974	ATL	5	2	1–1	34	79	43.0	373	4.7	0	9	18.0	2	1	0.5	0	9	113	0	0
1975	ATL	3	2	0–2	20	61	32.8	253	3.1	1	9	12.6	4	26	6.5	0	5	45	3	0
1976	ATL	8	3	1–2	48	121	39.7	450	3.7	2	10	21.7	9	26	2.9	0	17	164	6	0
1977	ATL	7	0	0–0	5	7	71.4	47	6.7	1	0	129.2	2	-1	-0.5	0	0	0	0	0
1979	WSH	3	0	0–0	1	4	25.0	12	3.0	0	1	25.0	2	-3	-1.5	0	0	0	0	0
Career		26	7	2–5	108	272	39.7	1,135	4.2	4	29	17.9	19	49	2.6	0	31	322	9	0

== Personal life ==
McQuilken went on to become executive vice president of The Cartoon Network, Inc., before leaving the company in 2006 to set up his own sports and entertainment marketing and licensing consulting business.
