= Larned High School =

Coordinates: 38.1829°N 99.1104°W

Location
- 805 Corse Avenue; Larned, Kansas 67550; United States

Information
- Type: Public high school
- School district: Fort Larned USD 495
- Principal: Roni Ettleman
- Staff: 21.40 (FTE)
- Enrollment: 228 (2023-2024)
- Student to teacher ratio: 10.65
- Colors: Black and orange
- Nickname: Indians
- Website: Larned High School

Larned High School is the public high school in Larned, Kansas, United States, and operated by Fort Larned USD 495 school district. The sports teams are called the Indians and the school colors are black and orange.

== History ==
Larned High School was established in 1890 and offered a 3-year school program. In 1904 it began offering a standard 4-year curriculum.

== Notable alumni ==
- Gene Keady, former head men's basketball coach for the Purdue Boilermakers from 1980 to 2005
- John Zook, football player

== See also ==
- List of high schools in Kansas
- List of unified school districts in Kansas
