= Ken Burrow =

American football player (born 1948)

- Burrow in 1972

No. 82
- Position: Wide receiver

Personal information
- Born: March 29, 1948 (age 78); Richmond, California, U.S.
- Listed height: 6 ft 0 in (1.83 m)
- Listed weight: 190 lb (86 kg)

Career information
- High school: De Anza (Richmond)
- College: Utah State (1967) San Diego State (1969–1970)
- NFL draft: 1971: 2nd round, 33rd overall pick

Career history
- Atlanta Falcons (1971–1975)

Career NFL statistics
- Games played: 64
- Starts: 61
- Receiving yards: 2,668 <small(17.6 average)
- Touchdowns: 21
- Stats at Pro Football Reference

Kenneth Robert Burrow (born March 29, 1948) is an American former professional football player who was a wide receiver for five seasons for the Atlanta Falcons of the National Football League (NFL). He gained a total of 2,693 yards during his NFL career, scoring 21 touchdowns.

== Biography ==
Ken Burrow was born March 29, 1948, in Richmond, California. He attended high school at De Anza High School in that Northern California city. At the time of his graduation from high school, he was offered a contract to play baseball for the Los Angeles Dodgers, who sought to sign him as a catcher. Burrow declined the offer, instead choosing to accept a college football scholarship.

Burrow enrolled at Utah State University and played the 1966 season there. He decided to leave after one year, however, returning to California to attend San Diego State, where he studied criminal justice. Playing on the 1970 San Diego State Aztecs football team, Burrow had a masterful senior season, snagging 54 passes for 904 yards and 12 touchdowns, placing himself firmly on the radar of the scouting departments of the National Football League.

He was drafted in the second round of the 1971 NFL draft by the Atlanta Falcons, who used the 33rd selection in the draft to land his signing rights. Burrow was the fourth wide out to come off the board of that 1971 draft.

Burrow set the league on fire as a rookie in 1971, setting the mark for the best receiving day by a National Football Conference receiver not one but twice — accumulating 190 receiving yards in an October 3 game against the Detroit Lions and again in the final game of the year at New Orleans. He finished the year with 741 yards in the air, second-most in tam history to Paul Flatley and his 834 yards in 1969. All the more remarkable, he accomplished this feat with a fractured wrist, injured in his impressive Week 3 performance against the Lions when he rolled over at the end of a 66 yard passing play.

Burrow played his entire 5-year NFL career with the Falcons, starting a total of 61 games. The team never made the playoffs until 1978, three years after his retirement.

== NFL career statistics ==
Legend
**Bold**	Career high

Year	Team	Games		Receiving				
Year	Team	GP	GS	Rec	Yds	Avg	Lng	TD
1971	ATL	**14**	**14**	33	**741**	**22.5**	**84**	6
1972	ATL	**14**	**14**	29	492	17.0	40	5
1973	ATL	9	8	31	567	18.3	57	**7**
1974	ATL	**14**	**14**	**34**	545	16.0	48	1
1975	ATL	13	11	25	323	12.9	23	2
		64	61	152	2,668	17.6	84	21
