= Jim Mitchell (tight end) =

American football player (1947–2007)

- Mitchell in 1972

No. 86
- Position: Tight end

Personal information
- Born: October 19, 1947; Shelbyville, Tennessee, U.S.
- Died: October 20, 2007 (aged 60); Shelbyville, Tennessee, U.S.
- Listed height: 6 ft 1 in (1.85 m)
- Listed weight: 234 lb (106 kg)

Career information
- High school: Harris (Shelbyville)
- College: Prairie View A&M (1965–1968)
- NFL draft: 1969: 4th round, 81st overall pick

Career history
- Atlanta Falcons (1969–1979)

Awards and highlights
- Second-team All-Pro (1972); 2× Pro Bowl (1969, 1972)

Career NFL statistics
- Receptions: 305
- Receiving yards: 4,358
- Receiving touchdowns: 28
- Stats at Pro Football Reference

James Robert Mitchell (October 19, 1947 – October 20, 2007) was an American professional football player who was a tight end for 11 seasons with the Atlanta Falcons in the National Football League (NFL). He was selected as a member of the Pro Bowl following his 1969 rookie season and again in 1972.

== Biography ==
Jim Mitchell was born October 19, 1947, in Shelbyville, Tennessee .

Mitchell attended Prairie View A&M University in Prairie View, Texas, where he was a two sport athlete. An all-conference split end on the football team, Mitchell also pitched and played first base for the school baseball team.

Mitchell was drafted 81st overall in the fourth round of the 1969 NFL draft by the Atlanta Falcons. During his rookie season the big tight end caught 22 passes for 339 yards, scoring 4 touchdowns—sufficient to win him a place on the 1969 Pro Bowl team.

He nearly doubled his production during his second season with the team, catching 44 balls for 650 yards and 6 touchdowns. Although the Falcons were a poor team in these years, Mitchell emerged as an offensive star and team leader and he was named captain of the Falcons offense in 1971.

Mitchell was again named to the NFL Pro Bowl team in 1972.

After leaving the NFL, Mitchell coached football at Morehouse College and Morris Brown College in Atlanta, Georgia, supporting the tradition of college football at historically black colleges and universities.

Mitchell died on October 20, 2007, in Shelbyville, Tennessee, at the age of 60.

== NFL career statistics ==
Legend
**Bold**	Career high

=== Regular season ===
Year	Team	Games		Receiving				
Year	Team	GP	GS	Rec	Yds	Avg	Lng	TD
1969	ATL	14	14	22	339	15.4	42	4
1970	ATL	14	14	**44**	**650**	14.8	51	**6**
1971	ATL	13	13	33	593	**18.0**	43	5
1972	ATL	14	14	28	470	16.8	40	4
1973	ATL	14	14	32	420	13.1	50	0
1974	ATL	14	14	30	479	16.0	**52**	1
1975	ATL	14	14	34	536	15.8	32	4
1976	ATL	14	14	17	209	12.3	39	0
1977	ATL	12	12	17	178	10.5	17	0
1978	ATL	16	16	32	366	11.4	24	2
1979	ATL	16	16	16	118	7.4	14	2
		155	155	305	4,358	14.3	52	28

=== Playoffs ===
Year	Team	Games		Receiving				
Year	Team	GP	GS	Rec	Yds	Avg	Lng	TD
1978	ATL	2	2	3	35	11.7	19	1
		2	2	3	35	11.7	19	1

== Personal life ==
Mitchell's son, Brandon Hodges, played football at Bethune-Cookman University.
