= Art Malone (American football) =

American football player (1948–2012)

- Malone in 1972

No. 25, 26
- Position: Running back

Personal information
- Born: March 20, 1948; Tyler, Texas, U.S.
- Died: July 27, 2012 (aged 64); Tempe, Arizona, U.S.
- Listed height: 5 ft 11 in (1.80 m)
- Listed weight: 211 lb (96 kg)

Career information
- High school: Santa Cruz Valley Union (Eloy, Arizona)
- College: Arizona State (1966-1969)
- NFL draft: 1970: 2nd round, 39th overall pick

Career history
- Atlanta Falcons (1970–1974); Philadelphia Eagles (1975–1976)

Awards and highlights
- WAC Offensive Player of the Year (1968)

Career NFL statistics
- Rushing yards: 2,457
- Rushing average: 3.9
- Receptions: 161
- Receiving yards: 1,465
- Total touchdowns: 25
- Stats at Pro Football Reference

Arthur Lee Malone (March 20, 1948 – July 27, 2012) was an American professional football player who was a running back for seven seasons in the National Football League (NFL) for the Atlanta Falcons and Philadelphia Eagles. He played college football for the Arizona State Sun Devils and was selected in the second round of the 1970 NFL draft.

He is the older brother of Benny Malone.

Malone died on July 27, 2012.

== NFL career statistics ==
Legend
**Bold**	Career high

Year	Team	Games		Rushing					Receiving				
Year	Team	GP	GS	Att	Yds	Avg	Lng	TD	Rec	Yds	Avg	Lng	TD
1970	ATL	**14**	3	40	136	3.4	12	0	9	38	4.2	9	1
1971	ATL	13	13	120	438	3.7	19	6	34	380	11.2	46	**2**
1972	ATL	**14**	**14**	**180**	**798**	4.4	**27**	**8**	**50**	**585**	**11.7**	**57**	**2**
1973	ATL	10	8	76	336	4.4	14	2	19	177	9.3	33	1
1974	ATL	13	12	116	410	3.5	13	2	28	168	6.0	13	0
1975	PHI	13	13	101	325	3.2	18	0	20	120	6.0	15	0
1976	PHI	3	0	2	14	**7.0**	15	1	1	-3	-3.0	-3	0
		80	63	635	2,457	3.9	27	19	161	1,465	9.1	57	6
