= Joe Washington (running back) =

American football player (1951-2020)

No. 30
- Position: Running back

Personal information
- Born: July 10, 1951; Baton Rouge, Louisiana, U.S.
- Died: October 13, 2020 (aged 69); Chicago, Illinois, U.S.
- Listed height: 5 ft 9 in (1.75 m)
- Listed weight: 180 lb (82 kg)

Career information
- High school: McKinley
- College: Illinois State
- NFL draft: 1973: undrafted

Career history
- Miami Dolphins (1973)*; Atlanta Falcons (1973)
- * Offseason or practice squad member only
- Stats at Pro Football Reference

Joseph Willie Washington (July 10, 1951 – October 13, 2020) was an American professional football running back who played for the Atlanta Falcons of National Football League (NFL). He played college football at Illinois State University.
