= Ottawa Rough Riders seasons (1970–1979) =

Contents:	1970 - 1971 - 1972 - 1973 - 1974 - 1975 - 1976 - 1977 - 1978 - 1979

From 1970 to 1979, the Ottawa Rough Riders won two Grey Cups. During the decade, the Rough Riders compiled a regular season record of 83 wins, 65 losses, and 4 ties. One of the highlights of the decade was the formation of Touch of Class in 1975. Touch of Class was composed of Notre Dame quarterback Tom Clements and Tennessee quarterback Condregde Holloway. In 1975, Holloway was tabbed as the starter, but after a 2–3 start and an injury during a 26–3 loss to Calgary, Brancato went with Clements. By early November, "Touch of Class" had led Ottawa to an 8–2–1 record.

Over the next three years, Brancato was able to rely on a quarterback combination that became increasingly threatening to defences. Each quarterback was talented enough to start and each was mobile. Clements would throw significantly more often than Holloway and see his completion percentage rise markedly each year. Holloway's abilities increased consistently as well.
