= Bob Berry (American football) =

American football player (1942–2023)

- Berry in 1972

No. 17
- Position: Quarterback

Personal information
- Born: March 10, 1942; San Jose, California, U.S.
- Died: April 17, 2023 (aged 81); Santa Cruz, California, U.S.
- Listed height: 5 ft 11 in (1.80 m)
- Listed weight: 185 lb (84 kg)

Career information
- High school: Willow Glen (San Jose)
- College: Oregon
- NFL draft: 1964: 11th round, 142nd overall pick
- AFL draft: 1964: 26th round, 201st overall pick

Career history
- Minnesota Vikings (1965–1967); Atlanta Falcons (1968–1972); Minnesota Vikings (1973–1975)

Awards and highlights
- Pro Bowl (1969); First-team All-American (1964); First-team All-PCC (1964); Second-team All-PCC (1963)

Career NFL statistics
- Passing attempts: 1,173
- Passing completions: 661
- Completion percentage: 56.4%
- TD–INT: 64–64
- Passing yards: 9,197
- Passer rating: 77.2
- Stats at Pro Football Reference

Robert Chadwick Berry Jr. (March 10, 1942 – April 17, 2023) was an American professional football player who was a quarterback in the National Football League (NFL) for twelve seasons. He was selected to one Pro Bowl in 1969 as a member of the Atlanta Falcons. Berry was a member of three Super Bowl teams with the Minnesota Vikings in the mid-1970s.

== College career ==
Born and raised in San Jose, California, Berry played football at Willow Glen High School, where his father was a longtime head coach. He graduated in 1960 and played college football at Oregon, where he was a three-year letter winner under head coach Len Casanova. At Oregon, Berry teamed with future Pro Football Hall of Famers Mel Renfro and Dave Wilcox and led the Ducks to three consecutive winning seasons. In his junior year in 1963, Oregon's last as an independent, the Ducks beat SMU 21–14 in the Sun Bowl on New Year's Eve. (The Pacific-8 conference did not allow a second bowl team until 1975).

Berry was named a first-team All-American after his senior season, despite being edged out as All-Pacific-8 quarterback by Craig Morton of California. In the balloting for the Heisman Trophy won by John Huarte of Notre Dame, Berry was thirteenth, just behind Joe Namath (Alabama) and Gale Sayers (Kansas). His teammates named him the outstanding player and he played in the East-West Shrine Game and the Hula Bowl.

In 1985, Berry received the university's distinguished alumnus award. Berry was inducted to the Oregon Sports Hall of Fame in 1987 and the University of Oregon Sports Hall of Fame in 1992.

== Professional career ==
=== Minnesota Vikings (first stint) ===
Selected 142nd overall by the Philadelphia Eagles in the eleventh round of the 1964 NFL draft and by the Denver Broncos in the twenty-sixth round of the 1964 AFL draft, Berry played his senior season at Oregon in 1964 and signed with the Minnesota Vikings in late November. Minnesota had acquired his draft rights in an off-season trade with the Eagles. Berry was out of college during the 1961 season, a de facto redshirt year.

Berry in action against the Detroit Lions, October 1971.

Berry played three seasons with the Vikings, the first two under head coach Norm Van Brocklin, himself a former Oregon quarterback, and was primarily a reserve behind Fran Tarkenton. He made his first start in 1966, a loss in the snow at home to the expansion Atlanta Falcons on December 4. Following the 1966 season, Tarkenton demanded to be traded and was sent to the New York Giants for multiple draft picks and Van Brocklin stepped down as head coach. Joe Kapp was the starting quarterback under new head coach Bud Grant in 1967 and Berry saw very limited action. In training camp in 1968, Berry was behind Kapp and Gary Cuozzo (acquired in a trade with the New Orleans Saints) and missed the final cut in early September.

=== Atlanta Falcons ===
Berry was quickly picked up by the Atlanta Falcons in 1968, and Van Brocklin became the head coach after the third game of the season. Berry started 51 games for the Falcons in five seasons, through 1972, throwing for 8,489 yards and 57 touchdowns, with a passer rating of 79.2. He was selected to the Pro Bowl in 1969. In May 1973, he was traded back to the Vikings for QB Bob Lee.

=== Minnesota Vikings (second stint) ===
Berry played for the Minnesota Vikings again for four seasons, beginning in 1973. He was again the backup to Tarkenton, and Minnesota played in three Super Bowls (VIII, IX, and XI) during this second stint, all losses. Berry retired from football on the first day of 1977 training camp, July 28; Berry's position with the Vikings became tenuous when they drafted Tommy Kramer from Rice three months earlier.

== NFL career statistics ==
Legend
	Led the league
**Bold**	Career high

Year	Team	Games			Passing									Rushing					Sacks	
Year	Team	GP	GS	Record	Cmp	Att	Pct	Yds	Y/A	Lng	TD	Int	Rtg	Att	Yds	Avg	Lng	TD	Sck	Yds
1965	MIN	2	0	0-0	0	2	0.0	0	0.0	0	0	0	39.6	0	0	0.0	0	0	0	0
1966	MIN	3	1	0-1	13	37	35.1	215	5.8	52	1	5	25.0	3	12	4.0	5	0	7	53
1967	MIN	2	0	0-0	3	7	42.9	43	6.1	21	0	0	63.4	0	0	0.0	0	0	6	49
1968	ATL	10	7	1-6	81	153	52.9	1,433	**9.4**	66	7	13	65.1	**26**	**139**	5.3	**45**	**2**	**49**	**364**
1969	ATL	7	7	4-3	71	124	57.3	1,087	8.8	**88**	10	2	106.5	20	68	3.4	30	0	31	219
1970	ATL	12	12	3-7-2	**156**	269	58.0	1,806	6.7	51	**16**	13	78.1	13	60	4.6	16	0	36	274
1971	ATL	11	10	4-5-1	136	226	60.2	2,005	8.9	84	11	**16**	75.9	19	31	1.6	9	0	21	150
1972	ATL	14	14	**7-7**	154	**277**	55.6	**2,158**	7.8	57	13	12	78.5	24	86	3.6	16	**2**	39	255
1973	MIN	6	0	0-0	10	24	41.7	121	5.0	30	1	2	37.0	2	5	2.5	5	0	1	8
1974	MIN	10	1	1-0	34	48	**70.8**	305	6.4	21	5	1	**113.6**	1	8	**8.0**	8	0	2	12
1975	MIN	1	0	0-0	3	6	50.0	24	4.0	17	0	0	60.4	1	0	0.0	0	0	1	9
Career		78	52	20-29-3	661	1,173	56.4	9,197	7.8	88	64	64	77.2	109	409	3.8	45	4	193	1,393

== Personal life and death ==
Berry had a daughter, Jennifer (born 1972) and a son, Michael (born 1993) and two grandchildren. Berry resided in Santa Cruz, California.

Berry's younger brother Ken was the starting quarterback at San Jose State, and their two teams met in 1963.

Berry died in Santa Cruz on April 17, 2023, at the age of 81.

== See also ==
- List of NCAA major college football yearly passing leaders
