= Bob Lee (quarterback) =

American football player (1945–2026)

No. 19
- Positions: Quarterback, punter

Personal information
- Born: August 7, 1945; Columbus, Ohio, U.S.
- Died: August 17, 2026 (aged 81); San Francisco, California, U.S.
- Listed height: 6 ft 2 in (1.88 m)
- Listed weight: 195 lb (88 kg)

Career information
- High school: Lowell (San Francisco)
- College: Arizona State (1963–1964); CCSF (1965); Pacific (1966–1967)
- NFL draft: 1968: 17th round, 441st overall pick

Career history
- Minnesota Vikings (1969–1972); Atlanta Falcons (1973–1974); Minnesota Vikings (1975–1978); Los Angeles Rams (1979–1980)

Awards and highlights
- NFL champion (1969); NFL punting yards leader (1971)

Career NFL statistics
- Passing attempts: 730
- Passing completions: 368
- Completion percentage: 50.4%
- TD–INT: 30–40
- Passing yards: 5,034
- Passer rating: 63.7
- Punting yards: 6,195
- Punting average: 39.7
- Stats at Pro Football Reference

Robert Melville Lee (August 7, 1945 – August 17, 2026) was an American professional football player who was a quarterback and punter in the National Football League (NFL). He played college football for the Arizona State Sun Devils, CCSF Rams and Pacific Tigers. Lee was selected 441st overall in the 1968 NFL/AFL draft by the NFL's Minnesota Vikings. He also played for the Atlanta Falcons and Los Angeles Rams.

== Early life ==
Lee was born in Columbus, Ohio, on August 7, 1945. He attended and played high school football for Lowell High School in San Francisco.

== College career ==
Lee initially played college football for the Arizona State Sun Devils in 1963 and 1964—lettering in 1964. He then attended the City College of San Francisco for the 1965 season before finishing his career with the Pacific Tigers—lettering in both 1966 and 1967.

== Professional career ==
=== Minnesota Vikings (first stint) ===
Lee was selected in the seventeenth round of the 1968 NFL/AFL draft by the Minnesota Vikings of the National Football League (NFL). As a member of the Vikings, he saw action as a punter in Super Bowl IV.

He started a 1971 NFC Divisional Playoff on Christmas against the Dallas Cowboys over Gary Cuozzo and Norm Snead. Lee was seven of seventeen for 86 yards—49 of those on a second quarter completion to Bob Grim—with no touchdowns and two interceptions. With the Vikings trailing 3–20 late in the third quarter, coach Bud Grant replaced Lee with Cuozzo, who led Minnesota to its lone touchdown on a 6-yard pass to Stu Voigt. Despite the late score, the team still lost 12–20.

=== Atlanta Falcons ===
On May 14, 1973, the Atlanta Falcons dealt quarterback Bob Berry and a first round draft pick for Lee and linebacker Lonnie Warwick. During his stint with the Falcons, he led Atlanta to a 20–14 victory over the 9–0 Minnesota Vikings on Monday Night Football on November 19, 1973. 1973 was Lee's most successful season in the NFL. He replaced Dick Shiner as the Falcons quarterback in Week 5 and led the Falcons to seven consecutive wins, including the win over the Vikings, on their way to a 9–5 record, the Falcons' best season in their history at that point. Lee started ten games and passed for 1,786 yards with ten touchdowns and eight interceptions.

=== Minnesota Vikings (second stint) ===
In 1976, Lee threw a touchdown pass in Super Bowl XI. With starting quarterback Fran Tarkenton's late season injury in the 1977 season, Lee started and led the Vikings to a 14–7 win over the Los Angeles Rams in the divisional round of the playoffs. The game was infamous due to the muddy conditions. Lee started the NFC Championship the next week as well against the Dallas Cowboys, but the Vikings lost 23–6.

=== Los Angeles Rams ===
Lee was also a backup in Super Bowl XIV as a member of the Los Angeles Rams.

He is one of twelve quarterbacks to post both a perfect quarterback rating and a zero passer rating over the course of their careers, and is the first to have done so in the same season.

== Personal life and death ==
His son, Zac Lee, played football for the University of Nebraska–Lincoln and was the team's starting quarterback for most of the 2009 season, he briefly signed with the Seattle Seahawks and he played for the Las Vegas Locomotives of the United Football League (UFL). The two Lees are inducted in the San Francisco Prep Hall of Fame for football and they are the first father-son duo to be honored in the Hall of Fame. His daughter, Jenna Lee, worked in various roles for the Fox Business Network starting in 2007, prior to becoming an anchor on the Fox News Channel in 2010.

Lee died in San Francisco on August 17, 2026, at the age of 81.

== NFL career statistics ==
Legend
	Led the league
**Bold**	Career high

=== Regular season ===
Year	Team	Games			Passing										Rushing				Sacks		Fumbles	
Year	Team	GP	GS	Record	Cmp	Att	Pct	Yds	Avg	TD	Int	Rtg	TD%	Int%	Att	Yds	Avg	TD	Sck	Yds	Fum	Lost
1969	MIN	**14**	0	—	7	11	**63.6**	79	7.2	1	**0**	115.3	9.1	**0.0**	3	9	3.0	0	**0**	**0**	2	2
1970	MIN	6	2	2–0	40	79	50.6	610	7.7	5	5	71.2	6.3	6.3	10	20	2.0	**1**	6	36	2	2
1971	MIN	**14**	4	3–1	45	90	50.0	598	5.1	2	4	60.3	2.2	4.4	11	14	1.3	**1**	8	91	2	1
1972	MIN	2	0	—	3	6	50.0	75	**12.5**	1	**0**	**135.4**	**16.7**	**0.0**	0	0	0.0	0	**0**	**0**	0	0
1973	ATL	12	**10**	**8–2**	**120**	**230**	52.2	**1,786**	7.8	**10**	8	77.9	4.3	3.5	**29**	67	2.4	0	28	256	6	2
1974	ATL	9	9	2–7	78	172	45.3	852	5.0	3	14	32.4	1.7	8.1	19	**99**	**5.2**	**1**	31	269	4	4
1975	MIN	4	0	—	5	14	35.7	103	7.4	2	1	72.3	14.3	7.1	1	0	0.0	0	1	6	1	1
1976	MIN	4	1	1–0	15	30	50.0	156	5.2	0	2	37.6	0.0	6.7	2	2	1.0	0	6	41	3	3
1977	MIN	5	4	3–1	42	72	58.3	522	7.3	4	4	76.3	5.6	5.6	12	-8	-0.7	0	7	47	1	1
1978	MIN	3	0	–	2	4	50.0	10	2.5	0	1	16.7	0.0	25.0	0	0	0.0	0	2	20	**0**	**0**
1979	LAR	3	0	–	11	22	50.0	243	10.8	2	1	101.1	9.1	4.5	4	-5	-1.3	0	4	39	1	0
1980	LAR	1	0	–	0	0	0.0	0	0.0	0	0	0.0	0.0	0.0	0	0	0.0	0	0	0	0	0
Career		77	30	19−11	368	730	50.4	5,034	5.3	30	40	63.7	4.1	5.5	92	197	2.1	3	93	805	22	18

Year	Team	GP	Punting				
Year	Team	GP	Punts	Yds	Avg	Lng	Blk
1969	MIN	**14**	67	2,680	**40.0**	56	**0**
1971	MIN	**14**	**89**	**3,515**	39.5	**58**	**0**
Career		28	156	6,195	39.7	58	0

=== Postseason ===
Year	Team	Games			Passing										Rushing				Sacks		Fumbles	
Year	Team	GP	GS	Record	Cmp	Att	Pct	Yds	Avg	TD	Int	Rtg	TD%	Int%	Att	Yds	Avg	TD	Sck	Yds	Fum	Lost
1969	MIN	**3**	0	—	0	0	0.0	0	0.0	0	0	0.0	0.0	0.0	0	0	0.0	0	0	0	0	0
1971	MIN	1	1	0–1	7	16	42.8	86	5.4	0	2	21.4	0.0	12.5	**3**	**28**	**9.3**	**0**	**0**	**0**	**0**	**0**
1976	MIN	2	0	—	7	10	**70.0**	81	**8.1**	**1**	**0**	**127.5**	**10.0**	**0.0**	2	4	2.0	**0**	1	7	1	1
1977	MIN	2	**2**	**1–1**	**19**	**41**	46.3	**215**	5.2	0	1	52.4	0.0	2.4	**3**	-10	-3.3	**0**	3	22	1	1
Career		8	3	1–2	33	67	49.3	382	5.7	1	3	47.8	1.5	4.5	8	22	2.8	0	4	29	2	2
