= Marion Campbell =

American football player and coach (1929–2016)

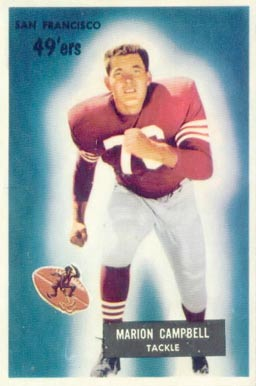
- Campbell on a 1955 Bowman football card

No. 76, 78
- Positions: Defensive end, defensive tackle, guard, tackle

Personal information
- Born: May 25, 1929; Chester, South Carolina, U.S.
- Died: July 13, 2016 (aged 87); Plano, Texas, U.S.
- Listed height: 6 ft 3 in (1.91 m)
- Listed weight: 250 lb (113 kg)

Career information
- College: Georgia (1948–1951)
- NFL draft: 1952: 4th round, 46th overall pick

Career history

Playing
- San Francisco 49ers (1954–1955); Philadelphia Eagles (1956–1961)

Coaching
- Boston Patriots (1962–1963) Defensive line coach; Minnesota Vikings (1964–1966) Defensive line coach; Los Angeles Rams (1967–1968) Defensive line coach; Atlanta Falcons (1969–1974) Defensive coordinator; Atlanta Falcons (1974–1976) Head coach; Philadelphia Eagles (1977–1982) Defensive coordinator; Philadelphia Eagles (1983–1985) Head coach; Atlanta Falcons (1987–1989) Head coach; Georgia (1994) Defensive coordinator

Awards and highlights
- NFL champion (1960); First-team All-Pro (1960); 2× Pro Bowl (1959, 1960)

Career NFL statistics
- Games played: 95
- Games started: 81
- Fumble recoveries: 8
- Interceptions: 3
- Stats at Pro Football Reference

Head coaching record
- Regular season: 34–80–1 (.300)
- Coaching profile at Pro Football Reference

Francis Marion Campbell (May 25, 1929 – July 13, 2016) was an American professional football player and coach in the National Football League (NFL). He played as a defensive lineman and was the head coach of the Atlanta Falcons and Philadelphia Eagles.

Campbell played college football for the Georgia Bulldogs from 1949 until 1951, where he was nicknamed "Swamp Fox" after Revolutionary War General Francis Marion. During his National Football League (NFL) playing career, he played for the San Francisco 49ers (1954–1955) and the Philadelphia Eagles (1956–1961), winning Pro Bowl honors in 1959 and 1960 and also being named 1st team All-Pro in 1960 as part of the Eagles' championship team that year. He was one of the last of the NFL's "two-way" players who played all offensive and defensive snaps in a game.

== Coaching career ==
=== NFL ===
Campbell was head coach of the Atlanta Falcons (twice) and Philadelphia Eagles as well as the defensive coordinator for each team separate from his times as head coach. He also served as defensive line coach for the Boston Patriots (1962–1963), Minnesota Vikings (1964–1966), and the Los Angeles Rams (1967–1968). He was an expert in the 3–4 defense; his Eagles defenses ranked first in the league in points allowed in 1980 and 1981, and second and first in yards allowed. At 46 games under .500, Campbell's 34–80–1 head coaching record is the worst among all NFL head coaches to coach over 100 games and is the fifth lowest winning percentage among head coaches who have coached at least five seasons in the NFL. The only coaches with worse winning percentages are Phil Handler, Bert Bell, Carl Storck, and David Shula.

=== Georgia ===
Campbell spent the 1994 season as the defensive coordinator for his alma mater Georgia Bulldogs.

== Head coaching record ==
Team	Year	Regular Season				
Team	Year	Won	Lost	Ties	Win %	Finish
ATL	1974	1	5	0	.167	4th in NFC West
ATL	1975	4	10	0	.286	3rd in NFC West
ATL	1976	1	4	0	.200	3rd in NFC West
PHI	1983	5	11	0	.313	4th in NFC East
PHI	1984	6	9	1	.400	5th in NFC East
PHI	1985	6	9	0	.400	4th in NFC East
ATL	1987	3	12	0	.200	4th in NFC West
ATL	1988	5	11	0	.313	4th in NFC West
ATL	1989	3	9	0	.250	4th in NFC West
Total		34	80	1	.300	

== Personal life ==
Campbell spent two years in the United States Army between college and the NFL. He lived in St. Augustine, Florida with his wife, the former June Roberts. The Campbells have two children: a daughter, Alicia Johnson, and a son, Scott. In 2013, Campbell fell and broke multiple vertebrae in his neck. He died on July 13, 2016.
