= John Zook =

American football player (1947–2020)

No. 71, 63
- Position: Defensive end

Personal information
- Born: September 24, 1947; Garden City, Kansas, U.S.
- Died: June 6, 2020 (aged 72); Wichita, Kansas, U.S.
- Listed height: 6 ft 4 in (1.93 m)
- Listed weight: 243 lb (110 kg)

Career information
- High school: Larned (Larned, Kansas)
- College: Kansas
- NFL draft: 1969: 4th round, 99th overall pick

Career history
- Atlanta Falcons (1969–1975); St. Louis Cardinals (1976–1979)

Awards and highlights
- Second-team All-Pro (1973); Pro Bowl (1973); Consensus All-American (1968); 2× First-team All-Big Eight (1967, 1968); Second-team All-Big Eight (1966)

Career NFL statistics
- Fumble recoveries: 8
- Interceptions: 4
- Touchdowns: 1
- Sacks: 78
- Stats at Pro Football Reference

John Eldon Zook (September 24, 1947 – June 6, 2020) was an American professional football player who was a defensive end for 12 seasons in the National Football League (NFL). He played for the St. Louis Cardinals and the Atlanta Falcons. Zook played college football for the University of Kansas.

Zook was born in Garden City, Kansas, and grew up in Zook and Larned. He was a three-year letterman, was picked twice for all-conference honors, anchoring one of the top defensive units ever taking the field at KU. He was an honorable mention All-American in 1967 and was a consensus All-America honors as the Jayhawks' defensive standout on the 1968 Orange Bowl-bound team, the year KU was named No. 6 by the Associated Press. Zook had 202 total tackles during his career, putting him at No. 4 on KU's all-time defensive line list. KU Coach Pepper Rodgers said Zook "never played but full speed from snap one to snap hundred. He was the most full-speed player on every snap that you could imagine." He was also chosen in the KU All-Time team by the Lawrence Journal-World.

Zook was drafted by the Los Angeles Rams in the fourth round (99th overall) of the 1969 NFL/AFL draft. He was traded to the Philadelphia Eagles and then by the Eagles to the Atlanta Falcons, where began his NFL career in 1969. Zook played 144 games in the NFL and was a Second-team All-Pro selection in 1973. He had been a Second-team All-NFC selection in 1972 and 1973 and was voted to the 1973 Pro Bowl. Zook was traded to the St. Louis Cardinals in 1976 and finished his career there.

Zook recorded the first ever safety for the Falcons franchise.

Zook died on June 6, 2020, in Kansas.
