= Ray Brown (safety) =

American football player (1949–2023)

- Brown in 1972

No. 34, 27
- Position: Safety

Personal information
- Born: January 12, 1949; Fort Worth, Texas, U.S.
- Died: October 26, 2023 (aged 74); Savannah, Georgia, U.S.
- Listed height: 6 ft 1 in (1.85 m)
- Listed weight: 208 lb (94 kg)

Career information
- College: West Texas State (1967–1970)
- NFL draft: 1971: 6th round, 148th overall pick

Career history
- Atlanta Falcons (1971–1977); New Orleans Saints (1978–1980)

Career NFL statistics
- Games played: 137
- Starts: 130
- Interceptions: 38
- Fumble recoveries: 10
- Touchdowns: 2
- Stats at Pro Football Reference

Raymond Madison Brown (January 12, 1949 – October 26, 2023) was an American professional football player who was a safety in the National Football League (NFL). He played college football for the West Texas State Buffaloes. He was drafted 148th overall by the Atlanta Falcons in the sixth round of the 1971 NFL draft.

== Biography ==
In 1973, Brown led the Falcons with six interceptions. He then played for the New Orleans Saints from 1978 to 1980.

After the end of his football career, Brown began a construction and remodeling business in 1983, which he ran until 2016.

Brown and his wife, Linda, were married for 49 years and had four children. Brown died from complications of dementia and lung cancer at his home in Savannah, Georgia, on October 26, 2023, at the age of 74.
