= 1967 Atlanta Falcons season =

NFL team season

- Owner: Rankin M. Smith Sr.
- General manager: Frank E. Wall
- Head coach: Norb Hecker
- Home stadium: Atlanta Stadium

Results
- Record: 1–12–1
- Division place: 4th Coastal
- Playoffs: Did not qualify
- Pro Bowlers: LB Tommy Nobis

The 1967 Atlanta Falcons season was the franchise's second year in the National Football League (NFL). Unable to improve on their 3–11, second-to-last place finish from their inaugural season, the Falcons finished with the worst record in the whole NFL, at 1–12–1. They failed to qualify for the playoffs for the second consecutive season.

The Falcons were shifted from the Eastern Conference to the Western with the addition of the New Orleans Saints for 1967. Atlanta was further east than three Eastern Conference teams: the Saints, Dallas Cowboys, and St. Louis Cardinals.

== Offseason ==
=== NFL draft ===
1967 Atlanta Falcons draft
| Round | Pick | Player | Position | College | Notes |
| 2 | 31 | Leo Carroll | Defensive end | San Diego State | |
| 3 | 57 | Jimmy Jordan | Running back | Florida | |
| 5 | 112 | Bill Delaney | Tight end | American International | |
| 5 | 120 | Randy Matson | Defensive tackle | Texas A&M | |
Made roster

== Personnel ==
=== Staff / Coaches ===
1967 Atlanta Falcons staff
| Front office: President – Rankin M. Smith Sr.; Assistant to the president – Bud Erickson; Vice president and general manager – Frank E. Wall; Head coaches: Head coach – Norb Hecker; Offensive coaches: Offensive backfield – Bill Crutchfield; Receivers – Lew Carpenter; Offensive line – Brad Ecklund; Assistant offensive line – Bob Fry | Defensive coaches: Chief defensive – Hal Herring; Defensive backfield – John Symank |

=== Roster ===
1967 Atlanta Falcons roster
| Quarterbacks (QB): 11 Randy Johnson; 14 Terry Nofsinger; 12 Steve Sloan; Running backs (RB): 34 Junior Coffey; 37 Perry Lee Dunn; 33 Jim Mankins; 21 Tom Moore; 23 Ron Rector; Wide receivers (WR): 80 Gary Barnes; 8 Tommy McDonald; 44 Jerry Simmons; 40 Ron Smith; Tight ends (TE): 85 Billy Martin; 28 Ray Ogden | Offensive linemen (OL): 64 Tom Harmon G; 65 Jake Kupp G; 73 Errol Linden T; 56 Frank Marchlewski C; 61 Bill Sandeman T; 66 Jim Simon G; 72 Don Talbert T; 63 Jim Wilson G; Defensive linemen (DL): 75 Bob Hughes DT; 70 Jim Norton DE; 68 Bobby Richards DE; 74 Karl Rubke DT; 77 Chuck Sieminski DT; 71 Joe Szczecko DT; 88 Sam Williams DE; 81 Bo Wood DE | Linebackers (LB): 51 Andy Bowling; 55 Ralph Heck; 60 Tommy Nobis; 52 Marion Rushing OLB; 54 Bob Sanders; Defensive backs (DB): 22 Lee Calland CB; 25 Mike Fitzgerald CB; 24 Floyd Hudlow SS; 27 Nick Rassas FS; 36 Ken Reaves CB; 43 Jerry Richardson SS; 20 Bob Riggle FS; Special teams (ST): 26 Billy Lothridge P; 7 Wade Traynham K | Practice squad: 57 Dick Absher LB; 38 Tom Bryan RB; 18 Corey Colehour QB; 58 George Patton DE; 42 Gene Snipes WR; 86 David Ray WR; Reserve: -- Leo Carroll DE (IR); 75 Ed Cook G (IR); 67 Dan Grimm G (IR); Rookies in italics |

== Regular season ==
=== Schedule ===
| Week | Date | Opponent | Result | Record | Venue | Attendance |
|---|---|---|---|---|---|---|
| 1 | September 17 | at **Baltimore Colts** | **L** 31–38 | 0–1 | Memorial Stadium | 56,715 |
| 2 | September 24 | at **San Francisco 49ers** | **L** 7–38 | 0–2 | Kezar Stadium | 30,207 |
| 3 | October 1 | at Green Bay Packers | **L** 0–23 | 0–3 | Milwaukee County Stadium | 49,467 |
| 4 | October 8 | Philadelphia Eagles | **L** 7–38 | 0–4 | Atlanta Stadium | 53,868 |
| 5 | October 15 | Washington Redskins | **T** 20–20 | 0–4–1 | Atlanta Stadium | 56,538 |
| 6 | October 22 | at Detroit Lions | **L** 3–24 | 0–5–1 | Tiger Stadium | 50,601 |
| 7 | October 29 | Minnesota Vikings | **W** 21–20 | 1–5–1 | Atlanta Stadium | 52,859 |
| 8 | November 5 | at Dallas Cowboys | **L** 7–37 | 1–6–1 | Cotton Bowl | 54,751 |
| 9 | November 12 | **Baltimore Colts** | **L** 7–49 | 1–7–1 | Atlanta Stadium | 58,850 |
| 10 | November 19 | **Los Angeles Rams** | **L** 3–31 | 1–8–1 | Atlanta Stadium | 56,871 |
| 11 | November 26 | at New Orleans Saints | **L** 24–27 | 1–9–1 | Tulane Stadium | 83,437 |
| 12 | December 3 | at **Los Angeles Rams** | **L** 3–20 | 1–10–1 | Los Angeles Memorial Coliseum | 46,395 |
| 13 | December 10 | **San Francisco 49ers** | **L** 28–34 | 1–11–1 | Atlanta Stadium | 51,798 |
| 14 | December 17 | Chicago Bears | **L** 14–23 | 1–12–1 | Atlanta Stadium | 54,107 |
Note: Intra-division opponents are in **bold** text.

=== Game summaries ===
==== Week 14 ====
| Team | 1 | 2 | 3 | 4 | Total |
|---|---|---|---|---|---|
| • Bears | 7 | 10 | 3 | 3 | 23 |
| Falcons | 7 | 0 | 0 | 7 | 14 |

- Date: December 17
- Location: Atlanta Stadium

=== Standings ===
NFL Coastal
| | W | L | T | PCT | DIV | CONF | PF | PA | STK |
|---|---|---|---|---|---|---|---|---|---|
| Los Angeles Rams | 11 | 1 | 2 | .917 | 4–1–1 | 8–1–1 | 398 | 196 | W8 |
| Baltimore Colts | 11 | 1 | 2 | .917 | 4–1–1 | 7–1–2 | 394 | 198 | L1 |
| San Francisco 49ers | 7 | 7 | 0 | .500 | 3–3 | 4–6 | 273 | 337 | W2 |
| Atlanta Falcons | 1 | 12 | 1 | .077 | 0–6 | 1–9 | 175 | 422 | L7 |

Note: Tie games were not officially counted in the standings until 1972.
