= 1966 Atlanta Falcons season =

NFL team season (Inaugural season)

- Owner: Rankin M. Smith Sr.
- Head coach: Norb Hecker
- Home stadium: Atlanta Stadium

Results
- Record: 3–11
- Conference place: 7th NFL Eastern
- Playoffs: Did not qualify
- Pro Bowlers: LB Tommy Nobis

The 1966 Atlanta Falcons season was the franchise's inaugural season in the National Football League (NFL). The Falcons finished in seventh place in the NFL Eastern Conference with a record of 3–11, ahead of only the New York Giants.

== Offseason ==
The Falcons attempted to acquire Green Bay Packers running back Jim Taylor. There were tensions in Green Bay because the Packers first round pick, Jim Grabowski would be groomed to take over for Taylor. The signing of Grabowski upset Taylor but he stated he would not leave Green Bay until his contract expired, therefore the Falcons could not acquire the running back.

=== NFL draft ===
Due to the addition of the team for the 1966 NFL season, the Falcons were allotted the first pick in all twenty rounds of the 1966 NFL draft, as well as five compensatory picks and the end of the first five rounds.

1966 Atlanta Falcons draft
Round	Pick	Player	Position	College	Notes
1	1	Tommy Nobis *	Linebacker	Texas	
1	16	Randy Johnson	Quarterback	Texas A&I	
2	17	Nick Rassas	Safety	Notre Dame	
2	32	Jerry Jones	Offensive tackle	Bowling Green	
3	33	Mike Dennis	Running back	Ole Miss	
3	48	Phil Sheridan	Wide Receiver	Notre Dame	
4	49	Ken Reaves *	Safety	Norfolk State	
4	64	Willie Asbury	Running back	Kent State	
5	65	Bill Wolski	Running back	Notre Dame	
5	80	Martin Kahn	Tackle	North Texas State	
6	81	Charley Casey	Wide Receiver	Florida	
7	96	William Johnson	Running Back	University of the South	
8	111	Bill Goss	Linebacker	Tulane	
9	126	Bob Sanders	Center	North Texas State	
10	141	Mike Bender	Guard	Arkansas	
11	156	Steve Sloan	Quarterback	Alabama	
12	171	Ken Hollister	Tackle	Indiana	
13	186	Bob Collins	Tackle	South Carolina	
14	201	Steve Ecker	Kicker	Shippensburg	
15	216	Tommy Tolleson	Wide Receiver	Alabama	
16	231	Jim Vining	Guard	Rice	
17	246	Lurley Archambeau	Center	Toledo	
18	261	Doug Korver	Center	Southern Iowa	
19	276	Walt Mainer	Defensive Back	Xavier	
20	291	Bob Riggle	Safety	Penn State	
Made roster * Made at least one Pro Bowl during career

=== Undrafted free agents ===
1966 undrafted free agents of note
Player	Position	College
Chuck Brooks	Cornerback	Wiley
Wade Traynham	Kicker	Frederick

== Personnel ==
=== Staff / Coaches ===
1966 Atlanta Falcons staff
Front office: President – Rankin M. Smith Sr.; Assistant to the president – Bud Erickson; Vice president and treasurer – Frank E. Wall; Head coaches: Head coach – Norb Hecker; Offensive coaches: Chief offensive – Tom Fears; Offensive backfield – George Dickson; Offensive line – Brad Ecklund	Defensive coaches: Chief defensive – Hal Herring; Defensive backfield – John Symank

=== Roster ===
The expansion Falcons were allowed to field a roster of 42(only dress 40) players while the rest of the league was limited to 40 during 1966.

1966 Atlanta Falcons roster
Quarterbacks (QB): 10 Dennis Claridge; 11 Randy Johnson; 14 Steve Sloan; Running backs (RB): 34 Junior Coffey; 37 Perry Lee Dunn; 29 Ron Rector; 32 Preston Ridlehuber; 30 Ernie Wheelwright; Wide receivers (WR): 84 Vern Burke; 48 Angelo Coia; 25 Alex Hawkins; 86 Tom Hutchinson; 82 Bob Sherlag; 86 Tommy Tolleson; Tight ends (TE): 87 Taz Anderson; 85 Billy Martin	Offensive linemen (OL): 75 Ed Cook G; 67 Dan Grimm G; 73 Errol Linden T; 53 Frank Marchlewski C; 66 Jim Simon T/G; 72 Don Talbert T; 51 Bob Whitlow C; Defensive linemen (DL): 70 Bud Marshall DT; 68 Bobby Richards DE; 74 Karl Rubke DT/DE; 77 Chuck Sieminski DT; 71 Joe Szczecko DT; 88 Sam Williams DE	Linebackers (LB): 55 Ralph Heck MLB; 57 Bill Jobko OLB; 33 Larry Morris OLB; 60 Tommy Nobis MLB; 52 Marion Rushing OLB; Defensive backs (DB): 22 Lee Calland CB; 47 Nick Rassas SS; 36 Ken Reaves CB; 43 Jerry Richardson SS; 20 Bob Riggle FS; 40 Ron Smith CB; Special teams (ST): 65 Lou Kirouac K; 26 Billy Lothridge P	Practice squad: 49 Floyd Hudlow S; 78 Richard Koeper T; 24 Jimmy Sidle RB; Reserve: 76 Guy Reese DT (IR); 54 Bob Sanders C (Military); 45 Carl Silvestri S (IR); 7 Wade Traynham K (IR); 44 Bill Wolski RB (IR); Rookies in italics

== Regular season ==
The Falcons played their first game (preseason) on August 1, 1966, against the Philadelphia Eagles before a crowd of 26,072 at Atlanta Stadium, a two-point Falcons loss, 9–7. In their inaugural regular season, Atlanta played each of the fourteen other teams in the league once. The Falcons lost their first nine regular season games; their first win was on the road against the New York Giants, 27–16, on November 20. Former Giant Ernie Wheelwright scored two touchdowns receiving and ran for 51 more yards as QB Randy Johnson hit for a trio of touchdowns.

Their first ever home victory was over the St. Louis Cardinals, 16–10, before 57,169 on December 11. The Falcons ended their inaugural season at 3–11, yet Tommy Nobis won the NFL Rookie of the Year Award and became the first Falcon named to the Pro Bowl.

=== Schedule ===
Week	Date	Opponent	Result	Record	Venue	Attendance	Recap
1	September 11	Los Angeles Rams	**L** 14–19	0–1	Atlanta Stadium	54,418	Recap
2	September 18	at **Philadelphia Eagles**	**L** 10–23	0–2	Franklin Field	54,049	Recap
3	September 25	at Detroit Lions	**L** 10–28	0–3	Tiger Stadium	47,615	Recap
4	October 2	**Dallas Cowboys**	**L** 14–47	0–4	Atlanta Stadium	56,990	Recap
5	October 9	at **Washington Redskins**	**L** 20–33	0–5	D.C. Stadium	50,116	Recap
6	October 16	San Francisco 49ers	**L** 7–44	0–6	Atlanta Stadium	54,788	Recap
7	October 23	at Green Bay Packers	**L** 3–56	0–7	Milwaukee County Stadium	48,623	Recap
8	October 30	**Cleveland Browns**	**L** 17–49	0–8	Atlanta Stadium	57,235	Recap
9	Bye						
10	November 13	Baltimore Colts	**L** 7–19	0–9	Atlanta Stadium	58,850	Recap
11	November 20	at **New York Giants**	**W** 27–16	1–9	Yankee Stadium	62,746	Recap
12	November 27	at Chicago Bears	**L** 6–23	1–10	Wrigley Field	44,777	Recap
13	December 4	at Minnesota Vikings	**W** 20–13	2–10	Metropolitan Stadium	37,117	Recap
14	December 11	**St. Louis Cardinals**	**W** 16–10	3–10	Atlanta Stadium	57,169	Recap
15	December 18	**Pittsburgh Steelers**	**L** 33–57	3–11	Atlanta Stadium	56,229	Recap
Note: Intra-conference opponents are in **bold** text.

=== Game summaries ===
==== Week 1 vs Los Angeles Rams ====
Week One: Los Angeles Rams (0–0) at Atlanta Falcons (0–0)

Quarter	1	2	3	4	Total
Rams	3	13	3	0	**19**
Falcons	0	7	7	0	**14**

at Atlanta Stadium, Atlanta

- Date: September 11
- Game weather: 71 °F (22 °C)
- Box Score

Game information

**First quarter**

- Los Angeles – Bruce Gossett 15-yard field goal, Rams 7–0.

**Second quarter**

- Los Angeles – Jack Snow) 51-yard pass from Roman Gabriel (Gossett kick), Rams 10–0.
- Los Angeles – Bruce Gossett 15-yard field goal, Rams 13–0.
- Los Angeles – Bruce Gossett 23-yard field goal, Rams 16–0.
- Atlanta – Gary Barnes 53-yard pass from Randy Johnson (Traynham kick), Rams 16–7.

**Third quarter**

- Atlanta – Randy Johnson 3-yard rush (Traynham kick), Rams 16–14.
- Los Angeles – Bruce Gossett 22-yard field goal, Rams 19–14.

**Fourth quarter**

**Top Passers**

- Rams – Roman Gabriel: 21/35, 294 yds, 1 TD, 1 INT
- Falcons – Randy Johnson: 9/25, 154 yds, 1 TD, 2 INT

**Top rushers**

- Rams – Dick Bass: 14 car, 81 yds.
- Falcons – Ernie Wheelwright: 6 car, 91 yds,

**Top receivers**

- Rams– Tommy McDonald: 9 rec, 114 yds
- Falcons – Gary Barnes: 1 rec, 53 yds 1 TD

==== Week 7: at Green Bay Packers ====
Week Seven: Atlanta Falcons (0–6) at Green Bay Packers (5–1)

Quarter	1	2	3	4	Total
Falcons	0	0	3	0	**3**
**Packers**	7	21	7	21	**56**

at Milwaukee County Stadium, Milwaukee, Wisconsin

- Date: Sunday, October 23
- Game weather: 46 °F (8 °C)
- Box Score

Game information

**First quarter**

- Green Bay – Elijah Pitts 3-yard run (Don Chandler kick), Packers 7–0

**Second quarter**

- Green Bay – Jim Taylor 1-yard run (Don Chandler kick), Packers 14–0
- Green Bay – Carroll Dale 51-yard pass from Bart Starr (Don Chandler kick), Packers 21–0
- Green Bay – Donny Anderson 5-yard run (Don Chandler kick), Packers 28–0

**Third quarter**

- Atlanta – Lou Kirouac 41-yard field goal, Packers 28–3
- Green Bay – Herb Adderley 68-yard interception return, Packers 35–3

**Fourth quarter**

- Green Bay – Max McGee 24-yard pass from Bart Starr (Don Chandler kick), Packers 42–3
- Green Bay – Donny Anderson 77-yard punt return (Don Chandler kick), Packers 49–3
- Green Bay – Doug Hart 40-yard interception return (Don Chandler kick), Packers 56–3

**Passing**

- Falcons – Randy Johnson 5/17, 91 yards, 3 INT
- Packers – Bart Starr 8/13, 220 yards, TD

**Rushing**

- Falcons – Ernie Wheelwright 8 att, 51 yards
- Packers – Jim Grabowski 7 att, 52 yards

**Receiving**

- Falcons – Bill Martin 4 rec, 42 yards
- Packers – Carroll Dale 4 rec, 110 yards, TD

==== Week 11 at New York Giants ====
Week Eleven: Atlanta Falcons (0-9) at New York Giants (1-7-1)

Quarter	1	2	3	4	Total
Falcons	7	6	7	7	**27**
Giants	0	3	7	6	**16**

at Yankee Stadium, New York City

- Date: November 20
- Game weather: 36 °F (2 °C)
- Box Score

Game information

**First quarter**

- Atlanta – Ernie Wheelwright 9-yard pass from Randy Johnson (Kirouac kick), Falcons 7–0.

**Second quarter**

- New York – Pete Gogolak 24-yard field goal, Falcons 7–3.
- Atlanta – Vern Burke 8-yard pass from Randy Johnson, Falcons 13–3.

**Third quarter**

- Atlanta – Ernie Wheelwright 6-yard pass from Randy Johnson (Kirouac kick), Falcons 20–3.
- New York – Joe Morrison 25-yard pass from Tom Kennedy (Gogolak kick), Falcons 20–10.

**Fourth quarter**

- Atlanta – Randy Johnson 3-yard rush (Kirouac kick), Falcons 27–10.
- New York – Joe Morrison 12-yard rush, Falcons 27–16.

**Top Passers**

- Falcons – Randy Johnson 15/25, 177 yds, 3 TD, 1 INT
- Giants – Tom Kennedy: 18/33, 188 yds, 1 TD, 1 INT

**Top rushers**

- Falcons – Junior Coffey: 16 car, 64 yds.
- Giants – Joe Morrison: 17 car, 91 yds 1 TD

**Top receivers**

- Falcons– Ernie Wheelwright: 5 rec, 35 yds 2 TD
- Giants – Aaron Thomas: 5 rec, 83 yds

== Standings ==
NFL Eastern Conference
	W	L	T	PCT	CONF	PF	PA	STK
Dallas Cowboys	10	3	1	.769	9–3–1	445	239	W1
Cleveland Browns	9	5	0	.643	9–4	403	259	W1
Philadelphia Eagles	9	5	0	.643	8–5	326	340	W4
St. Louis Cardinals	8	5	1	.615	7–5–1	264	265	L3
Washington Redskins	7	7	0	.500	7–6	351	355	L1
Pittsburgh Steelers	5	8	1	.385	4–8–1	316	347	W2
Atlanta Falcons	3	11	0	.214	2–5	204	437	L1
New York Giants	1	12	1	.077	1–11–1	263	501	L8

Note: Tie games were not officially counted in the standings until 1972.

== Awards and records ==
- Tommy Nobis, NFL Rookie of the Year
