= 1968 Atlanta Falcons season =

NFL team season

- Owner: Rankin M. Smith Sr.
- General manager: Frank E. Wall
- Head coach: Norb Hecker (0–3); Norm Van Brocklin (2–9)
- Home stadium: Atlanta Stadium

Results
- Record: 2–12
- Division place: 4th Coastal
- Playoffs: Did not qualify
- Pro Bowlers: LB Tommy Nobis

The 1968 Atlanta Falcons season was the franchise's third year in the National Football League (NFL). After going an NFL-worst 1–12–1 last year, the Falcons slightly improved on that record by going 2–12, but they still finished tied for the worst record in the whole NFL and failed to qualify for the playoffs for the third consecutive season.

== Offseason ==
=== NFL draft ===
1968 Atlanta Falcons draft
Round	Pick	Player	Position	College	Notes
1	3	Claude Humphrey * ^{†}	Defensive end	Tennessee State	
2	29	Carlton Dabney	Defensive tackle	Morgan State	
2	53	John Wright	Wide receiver	Illinois	
Made roster † Pro Football Hall of Fame * Made at least one Pro Bowl during career

=== Undrafted free agents ===
1968 undrafted free agents of note
Player	Position	College
Jim Bellamy	Running back	Albany State
Bobby Lowery	Defensive back	New Mexico State
Felton Roundtree	Guard	Edward Waters
Oliver Spencer	Tackle	Prairie View A&M

== Personnel ==
=== Staff / Coaches ===
1968 Atlanta Falcons staff
Front office: President – Rankin M. Smith Sr.; Assistant to the president – Bud Erickson; Vice president and general manager – Frank E. Wall; Head coaches: Head coach – Norb Hecker (first three games); Head coach – Norm Van Brocklin; Offensive coaches: Chief offensive – Lew Carpenter; Receivers – Jim Phillips; Offensive line – Bob Fry	Defensive coaches: Chief defensive – Hal Herring; Linebackers – Bill Jobko; Defensive backfield – John Symank

=== Roster ===
1968 Atlanta Falcons roster
Quarterbacks (QB): 17 Bob Berry; 11 Randy Johnson; 18 Bruce Lemmerman; Running backs (RB): 38 Joe Auer; 33 Jim Butler; 37 Perry Lee Dunn; 35 Billy Harris; 31 Dwight Lee; 5 Harmon Wages; Wide receivers (WR): 45 Dave Dunaway; 25 Rick Eber; 85 Paul Flatley; 44 Jerry Simmons; Tight ends (TE): 84 Mike Donohoe; 28 Ray Ogden	Offensive linemen (OL): 65 Steve Duich G; 67 Dan Grimm C/G; 73 Errol Linden T; 66 Jim Simon G; 53 Phil Sobocinski C; 72 Don Talbert T; 64 Randy Winkler G; Defensive linemen (DL): 77 Rick Cash DE; 79 Carlton Dabney DT; 87 Claude Humphrey DE; 78 Jerry Shay DE/DT; 74 Art Strahan DT; 71 Joe Szczecko DT	Linebackers (LB): 57 Dick Absher OLB; 54 Grady Allen OLB; 50 Greg Brezina OLB; 55 Ralph Heck OLB; 60 Tommy Nobis MLB; Defensive backs (DB): 49 Jimmy Burson FS/CB; 43 Mike Freeman CB; 24 Floyd Hudlow SS; 26 Billy Lothridge P/FS; 27 Nick Rassas SS; 36 Ken Reaves CB; Special teams (ST): 3 Bob Etter K	Reserve: 52 Ron Acks LB (IR); 34 Junior Coffey RB (IR); 76 Jim Garcia DE (IR); 80 Bob Long WR (IR); 20 Bob Riggle S (IR); 61 Bill Sandeman T (IR); Rookies in italics

== Regular season ==
=== Schedule ===
Week	Date	Opponent	Result	Record	Venue	Attendance
1	September 14	at Minnesota Vikings	**L** 7–47	0–1	Metropolitan Stadium	45,563
2	September 22	**Baltimore Colts**	**L** 20–28	0–2	Atlanta Stadium	50,428
3	September 29	at **San Francisco 49ers**	**L** 13–28	0–3	Kezar Stadium	27,471
4	October 6	Green Bay Packers	**L** 7–38	0–4	Atlanta Stadium	58,850
5	October 13	New York Giants	**W** 24–21	1–4	Atlanta Stadium	49,962
6	October 20	at **Los Angeles Rams**	**L** 14–27	1–5	Los Angeles Memorial Coliseum	54,443
7	October 27	at Cleveland Browns	**L** 7–30	1–6	Cleveland Municipal Stadium	67,723
8	November 3	Pittsburgh Steelers	**L** 21–41	1–7	Atlanta Stadium	47,727
9	November 10	**Los Angeles Rams**	**L** 10–17	1–8	Atlanta Stadium	53,979
10	November 17	at Chicago Bears	**W** 16–13	2–8	Wrigley Field	44,214
11	November 24	at St. Louis Cardinals	**L** 12–17	2–9	Busch Memorial Stadium	43,246
12	December 1	at **Baltimore Colts**	**L** 0–44	2–10	Memorial Stadium	60,238
13	December 8	Detroit Lions	**L** 7–24	2–11	Atlanta Stadium	49,437
14	December 15	**San Francisco 49ers**	**L** 12–14	2–12	Atlanta Stadium	44,977
Note: Intra-division opponents are in **bold** text.

== Standings ==
NFL Coastal
	W	L	T	PCT	DIV	CONF	PF	PA	STK
Baltimore Colts	13	1	0	.929	6–0	10–0	402	144	W8
Los Angeles Rams	10	3	1	.769	3–2–1	6–3–1	312	200	L2
San Francisco 49ers	7	6	1	.538	2–3–1	4–5–1	303	310	W1
Atlanta Falcons	2	12	0	.143	0–6	1–9	170	389	L4

Note: Tie games were not officially counted in the standings until 1972.
