= 1969 Atlanta Falcons season =

NFL team season

- Owner: Rankin M. Smith Sr.
- General manager: Frank E. Wall
- Head coach: Norm Van Brocklin
- Home stadium: Atlanta Stadium

Results
- Record: 6–8
- Division place: 3rd Coastal
- Playoffs: Did not qualify
- Pro Bowlers: None

The 1969 Atlanta Falcons season was the franchise's fourth year in the National Football League (NFL). The team improved on their previous season's output of 2–12, winning six games. The Falcons had yet to reach the postseason, and would not until 1978. The Falcons rookie squad would play a preseason game against the minor league Alabama Hawks.

== Offseason ==
=== NFL draft ===
1969 Atlanta Falcons draft
Round	Pick	Player	Position	College	Notes
1	2	George Kunz *	Tackle	Notre Dame	
2	29	Paul Gipson *	Running back	Houston	
3	54	Malcolm Snider	Tackle	Stanford	
3	67	Jon Sandstron	Guard	Oregon State	
4	81	James Mitchell *	Tight end	Prairie View A&M	
4	103	Dickie Lyons	Defensive back	Kentucky	
5	127	Tony Pleviak	Defensive end	Illinois	
6	137	Wally Oyler	Defensive back	Louisville	
7	148	Dick Enderle	Guard	Minnesota	
7	164	Ted Cottrell	Linebacker	Delaware Valley	
8	185	Jim Callahan	Wide receiver	Temple	
10	237	Jeff Stanciel	Running back	Mississippi Valley	
11	262	Jeff Van Note *	Linebacker	Kentucky	
12	289	Denver Samples	Defensive tackle	Texas–El Paso	
13	314	Harry Carpenter	Tackle	Tennessee State	
14	341	Billy Hunt	Defensive back	Kansas	
15	366	Jim Weatherford	Defensive back	Tennessee	
16	393	Ed Hughes	Running back	Texas Southern	
17	418	Paul Williams	Running back	California	
Made roster † Pro Football Hall of Fame * Made at least one Pro Bowl during career

=== Undrafted free agents ===
1969 undrafted free agents of note
Player	Position	College
Chuck Lauck	Linebacker	Notre Dame
Rick White	Tight end	Wake Forest

== Personnel ==
=== Staff / Coaches ===
1969 Atlanta Falcons staff
Front office: President – Rankin M. Smith Sr.; Vice president and general manager – Frank E. Wall; Head coaches: Head coach – Norm Van Brocklin; Offensive coaches: Offensive backfield – Walt Yowarsky; Offensive line – Duane Putnam	Defensive coaches: Head defensive – Marion Campbell; Defensive line – Bob Griffin; Defensive backfield – Fred Bruney

=== Roster ===
1969 Atlanta Falcons roster
Quarterbacks (QB): 17 Bob Berry; 18 Bruce Lemmerman; Running backs (RB): 32 Charlie Bryant; 33 Jim Butler; 45 Gary McDermott; 23 Jeff Stanciel; 5 Harmon Wages; Wide receivers (WR): 15 Gail Cogdill; 85 Paul Flatley; 43 Monte Ledbetter; 82 Bobby Lee; Tight ends (TE): 86 Jim Mitchell; 81 Ralph Smith	Offensive linemen (OL): 77 Bruce Bosley C; 65 Bob Breitenstein T/G; 63 Dick Enderle G; 75 George Kunz T; 61 Bill Sandeman T; 55 Roy Schmidt G; 67 Malcolm Snider G; 59 Jim Waskiewicz C; Defensive linemen (DL): 73 Dave Cahill DT; 88 Glen Condren DT; 70 Bob Hughes DE; 87 Claude Humphrey DE; 78 Jerry Shay DT; 71 John Zook DE	Linebackers (LB): 52 Ron Acks OLB; 54 Grady Allen OLB; 50 Greg Brezina OLB; 51 Ted Cottrell OLB; 55 Don Hansen MLB; Defensive backs (DB): 28 Mike Freeman FS/CB; 49 Al Lavan SS; 22 John Mallory FS; 20 Tom McCauley FS; 36 Ken Reaves CB; 47 Rudy Redmond CB; 42 Jim Weatherford SS; Special teams (ST): 3 Bob Etter K; 26 Billy Lothridge P	Practice squad: 8 Ken Vinyard K; Reserve: 79 Carlton Dabney DT (IR); 84 Mike Donohoe TE (IR); 40 Paul Gipson RB (IR); 11 Randy Johnson QB (IR); 60 Tommy Nobis LB (IR); 20 Bob Riggle S (IR); 74 Bill Sabatino DT (IR); 64 Randy Winkler G (Military); Rookies in italics

== Schedule ==
Week	Date	Opponent	Result	Record	Venue	Attendance
1	September 21	**San Francisco 49ers**	**W** 24–12	1–0	Atlanta Stadium	45,940
2	September 28	at **Los Angeles Rams**	**L** 7–17	1–1	Los Angeles Memorial Coliseum	58,031
3	October 5	**Baltimore Colts**	**L** 14–21	1–2	Grant Field^{a}	57,806
4	October 12	Dallas Cowboys	**L** 17–24	1–3	Atlanta Stadium	54,833
5	October 19	at **San Francisco 49ers**	**W** 21–7	2–3	Kezar Stadium	28,684
6	October 26	at Green Bay Packers	**L** 10–28	2–4	Lambeau Field	50,861
7	November 2	**Los Angeles Rams**	**L** 6–38	2–5	Atlanta Stadium	58,850
8	November 9	at Detroit Lions	**L** 21–27	2–6	Tiger Stadium	53,242
9	November 16	Chicago Bears	**W** 48–31	3–6	Atlanta Stadium	53,722
10	November 23	at Washington Redskins	**L** 20–27	3–7	RFK Stadium	50,345
11	November 30	at **Baltimore Colts**	**L** 6–13	3–8	Memorial Stadium	60,238
12	December 7	New Orleans Saints	**W** 45–17	4–8	Atlanta Stadium	51,021
13	December 14	at Philadelphia Eagles	**W** 27–3	5–8	Franklin Field	60,658
14	December 21	Minnesota Vikings	**W** 10–3	6–8	Atlanta Stadium	52,872
Note: Intra-division opponents are in **bold** text.

^aAtlanta Stadium was in use for the Atlanta Braves' NLCS game against the New York Mets, hence the Falcons moved their game to nearby Grant Field. As of 2023, this remains the only NFL game at Grant Field.

== Standings ==
NFL Coastal
	W	L	T	PCT	DIV	CONF	PF	PA	STK
Los Angeles Rams	11	3	0	.786	5–1	7–3	320	243	L3
Baltimore Colts	8	5	1	.615	3–3	5–4–1	279	268	W1
Atlanta Falcons	6	8	0	.429	2–4	4–6	276	268	W3
San Francisco 49ers	4	8	2	.333	2–4	3–7	277	319	W1

Note: Tie games were not officially counted in the standings until 1972.
