= History of the Atlanta Falcons =

Sports team history

The American football team Atlanta Falcons was founded in Atlanta, Georgia in 1965 and joined the NFL Eastern Conference, with Norb Hecker as coach. They soon moved to the NFC West division, and in 2002 to NFC South. Their home stadiums have been the Atlanta–Fulton County Stadium (1966–1991), the Georgia Dome (1992–2016), and Mercedes-Benz Stadium (since 2017).

The Falcons had little success at first and did not qualify for the postseason playoffs until 1978. They were NFC West champions in 1980 and 1998, and in 1998 played in the Super Bowl XXXIII match, losing to Denver Broncos.

The decade of the 2000s featured star player Michael Vick and was marred by criminal charges against him. Falcons finished top of NFC South in 2004, 2010 and 2012, and reached Super Bowl LI in 2016, where they lost to the New England Patriots.

== 1965–1969 ==
The Atlanta Falcons franchise began when it was approved to begin play in 1966 by a unanimous vote of the NFL club owners on June 21, 1965. NFL Commissioner Pete Rozelle granted ownership nine days later on June 30 to Rankin M. Smith Sr., the executive vice president of Life Insurance Company of Georgia. The name Falcons was suggested by Julia Elliott (1909–1990), a high school teacher from Griffin, Georgia who won a contest in 1965. Though 40 other contestants had also suggested the name, Elliott wrote in an essay, "The falcon is proud and dignified, with great courage and fight. It never drops its prey. It's deadly and has a great sporting tradition." Among the many suggested names were the Knights, Bombers, Rebels, Crackers, Confederates, Thrashers (which would later be the name of the city's second NHL team), Lancers, Firebirds, Fireballs, and Thunderbirds."

Rankin M. Smith Sr. would draft Tommy Nobis, LB, University of Texas with the first pick of the 1966 NFL draft held on November 27, 1965, making him the first ever Falcon. Early speculation on the team's first head coach focused on a host of tutors: former University of Oklahoma head coach Bud Wilkinson; University of Arkansas head coach Frank Broyles; former San Francisco 49ers head coach Red Hickey; and former Cleveland Browns head coach Paul Brown; and Green Bay Packers head coach Vince Lombardi were all considered or courted. In the end, Smith selected Lombardi's assistant Norb Hecker on January 26, 1966.

The Atlanta Falcons began their first NFL season in the NFL Eastern Conference, playing a "swing schedule", consisting of playing every other team once, in order to make up for the disparity of an odd number of teams. Their first game (preseason) was on August 1, 1966, against the Philadelphia Eagles before a crowd of 26,072 at the Atlanta Stadium. The Falcons would lose against the Eagles and would lose their first nine games in the regular season before finally getting their first franchise win on the road against the New York Giants, 27–16. Former Giant Ernie Wheelwright scored two touchdowns receiving and ran for 51 more yards as QB Randy Johnson hit for a trio of TD's. Their first ever home victory was against the St. Louis Cardinals, 16–10 to a crowd of 57,169. The Falcons ended their inaugural season at 3–11, yet Nobis won the NFL Rookie of the Year Award and became the first Falcon named to the Pro Bowl.

The 1967 season was no better as the Falcons exited their second season with only 1 win and a 1–12–1 season. After a dreadful 0–3 start in the 1968 season, Norm Van Brocklin, formerly head coach of the Minnesota Vikings, was named to replace Norb Hecker on October 1. Two weeks later, his Falcons beat New York 24–21, in the first meeting between Van Brocklin and his former QB, Fran Tarkenton. Despite the win, the Falcons would still finish with an abysmal 2–12 record. Although the first three seasons for the Falcons were dreadful, the Falcons turned things around in 1969. On September 21, the Falcons won their first season opener ever, beating the San Francisco 49ers, 24–12, before their home fans. Rookie tight end Jim Mitchell scored two TDs and the Falcons set a team record with 229 yards rushing. On December 7, Harmon Wages threw for a TD in the first quarter (16 yards to Paul Flatley), caught a pass for a TD in the second quarter (88 yards), and then ran for a TD in the fourth quarter (66 yards) in a 45–17 rout of the Saints. The Falcons finished the year with a vastly improved 6–8 record.

== 1970–1974 ==
The Falcons would have their first Monday Night Football game in Atlanta during the 1970 season on November 30, when they played the Miami Dolphins. The Falcons would end up losing 20–7 in front of an audience of 30 million TV viewers. The Falcons would end up going 4–8–2 for the 1970 season. Atlanta would have their first winning season in 1971. On November 22, the Falcons won their first nationally televised game with a 28–21 triumph over the Green Bay Packers in Atlanta. The Falcons would enter their final game of the season in New Orleans on December 19 with a 6–6–1 record, needing to beat the Saints to have their first winning record. The Falcons beat New Orleans, 24–20, with 40 seconds left in the game. The victory gave the Falcons a then-franchise best 7–6–1 record. In 1972, the Falcons finished 7-7.

The Falcons opened the 1973 season against New Orleans, smashing 35 team records en route to a 62–7 victory on September 16. Despite opening the season with a huge win, the Falcons would only manage to score 15 total points in the next 3 games, all of which they lost. The Falcons came back and won 7 in a row, including a victory against the unbeaten Vikings, 20–14, on November 19 before a national television audience. Dave Hampton once again barely missed the 1,000 yard mark for the season. The Falcons finished 9–5 for their best record ever up to that point, but lost out on the playoffs by one game.

1974 saw the Falcons collapse to a 3–11 record.

== 1975–1984: Steve Bartkowski era ==
In 1975, with the first pick in the NFL draft, the club selected quarterback Steve Bartkowski of the University of California. The Falcons finished the year with a 4–10 record, but Dave Hampton finally broke the 1,000 yard mark (1,002) in a 22–13 loss to the Green Bay Packers. Bartkowski would continue to struggle in 1976, throwing only 2 TDs while being picked off 9 times. Bartkowski was then replaced by Kim McQuilken, who fared no better, throwing 9 interceptions in three games. Because of the abysmal season, Coach Marion Campbell resigned. Pat Peppler would replace him, and the Falcons would go on to finish at 4–10. In 1977, former Redskins and Cowboys quarterback Eddie LeBaron was named general manager, and Leeman Bennett became the fifth head coach in club history. The following season, the Falcons' "Grits Blitz" defense (led by defensive coordinator Jerry Glanville) set an NFL record for the fewest points allowed in a 14-game season, with 129. They also set the record for the fewest points allowed per game for the year with 9.2 (a mark that not even the 1985 Bears defense could match). However, due to the team's lackluster offense (which averaged less than 13 points per game), the Falcons finished with a 7–7 record.

=== 1978 ===
Led by a strong defense, the team finished the 1978 season with a 9–7 record, qualifying for the postseason for the first time in franchise history. The season featured several dramatic comebacks, including two victories over rival New Orleans by identical 20-17 scores. In the playoffs, they met a team that didn't make the playoffs in a number of years, the Philadelphia Eagles. Despite falling behind 13–0, the Bartkowski-led Falcons came back to take a 14–13 lead, which held up after a chip-shot Eagles FG attempt sailed wide right with seconds remaining. Their next encounter would be with the heavily favored Dallas Cowboys. Despite knocking out Hall of Fame quarterback Roger Staubach and taking a 20–13 lead into halftime, the offense would only collect 85 net yards in the second half as the Cowboys, led by backup QB Danny White, came back and won 27–20. White would come back to haunt the Falcons yet again two years later.

=== 1979 ===
The Falcons were unable to carry the previous year's momentum into 1979, though, finishing 6–10. Records were broken for the season by William Andrews with 1,023 rushing yards, by Wallace Francis with 74 catches for 1,013 receiving yards, and by Steve Bartkowski with 2,502 passing yards (203 completions out of 379 attempts).

=== 1980 ===
1980 was a successful season for the Falcons, as they finished 12–4. While the season started at 3–3, Atlanta went on to record a 9-game winning streak. Bartkowski threw for three touchdowns on December 14 as the Falcons defeated the San Francisco 49ers, 35–10 to win their first-ever NFC West division title. In the Divisional Playoffs, the Falcons lost to the Dallas Cowboys, 30–27, as the Cowboys rallied for 20 points in Atlanta before a then-record crowd of 59,793, including a game-winning touchdown pass from Danny White to Drew Pearson with less than a minute to play. This loss is widely cited as one of the most devastating losses in Atlanta sports history (even more so than the Super Bowl loss to Denver in 1998), as many fans and the team itself took almost a decade to recover.

=== 1981–1984 ===
The 1981 season was plagued with injuries as the Falcons lost 3 key starters for the season. The Falcons would lose six games by less than a touchdown and finish with a 7–9 record.

In the strike-shortened 1982 season, the Falcons finished 5-4 and returned to the (expanded) playoffs, but lost to Minnesota 30–24 in the first round. In 1983, the Falcons finished 7–9.

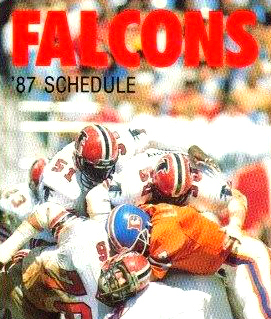
The Falcons' defense taking on Bronco's quarterback John Elway during a mid-1980s game.

In 1984, the Falcons suffered a huge loss when RB William Andrews suffered a career-threatening knee injury on the last day of training camp. He would be sidelined for 2 years before returning for the 1986 season, only to retire soon after.

== 1985–1989 ==
Gerald Riggs would replace him in the lineup, as Riggs was a bright spot in amassing over 3,000 yards and 23 touchdowns in those two seasons. However, the Falcons would finish with back-to-back 4–12 records for the 1984 and 1985 campaigns. After an average 7–8–1 season in 1986, where David Archer succeeded Steve Bartkowski as starting QB, head coach Dan Henning was dumped and replaced by Marion Campbell.

In 1987, Campbell did nothing to reverse the Falcons losing and they would finish their season with a 3–12 record, including losing 9 out of their last 10 games upon their return from the strike of that season. The 1988 season would also be awful as the Falcons would finish with a 5–11 season.

1988 would start with Atlanta drafting first overall, a pick they used to select Auburn linebacker Aundray Bruce, most notably bypassing perennial All-Pro DE Neil Smith, who went second overall to the Kansas City Chiefs. Settling in with 1987's first round selection Chris Miller as their new starting QB, Atlanta proceeded to lose seven out of their first 8 games. The Falcons were able to salvage their season somewhat with a stretch where they won 4 games out of 5, including a road win over the playoff-bound Eagles, but lost their last 3 games to finish 5–11 for the season.

In 1989, Atlanta's top draft pick (fifth overall) was a flamboyant All-American defensive back from Florida State named Deion Sanders who was as good at cultivating his "Prime Time" image as he was at intercepting passes and returning kicks. In drafting Sanders, it gave the Falcons something they had been sorely lacking since the departure of Bartkowski and the diminishing role of Gerald Riggs; an immediately identifiable franchise player. However, Sanders and the Falcons ended up in a contract dispute that lasted until the week leading up to the first game of the regular season as Sanders, among other things, used his standing as a prospect as an outfielder for the New York Yankees as negotiating leverage. Upon finally agreeing to terms, Sanders only practiced the Friday before the game and participated in the Saturday walk-through, put on the football pads for the first time in seven months in the season opener vs. the Rams and returned a punt 68 yards for a touchdown, making him the only modern-day athlete to hit a home run and score a touchdown in the same week (he had only left the Yankees a few days prior). However, the Falcons were unable to win many games, and in response Coach Marion Campbell resigned and replaced by Jim Hanifan on an interim basis. The Falcons would go on to a 3–13 record.

== 1990–1993: Jerry Glanville era ==
Their next head coach was former Oilers coach Jerry Glanville. Coinciding with Glanville's hiring and his "man in black" image, the Falcons altered their uniforms from their traditional red jersey/red helmet uniform to an all-black motif, which would remain in place until 2003.

The Falcons would start the 1990 season with an impressive win against Glanville's former team, the Houston Oilers, 47–27. The Falcons began the season 2–2, but their season took a turn for the worse after losing a 45–35 shootout to the defending champion 49ers (who they had played tough on the road a few weeks prior). Joe Montana torched the blitz-happy Falcons for 6 touchdown passes, and after that game Atlanta would lose 8 out of their next 9, pausing only to beat Glanville's former division rival Cincinnati before winning their last two games to finish at 5–11.

On October 28, Atlanta-based Turner Network Television, a subsidiary of the Turner Broadcasting System, did its first NFL game not only involving the Falcons, but also played in Atlanta. Mentions were made of these connections during the broadcast as the Falcons beat the Cincinnati Bengals 38–17.

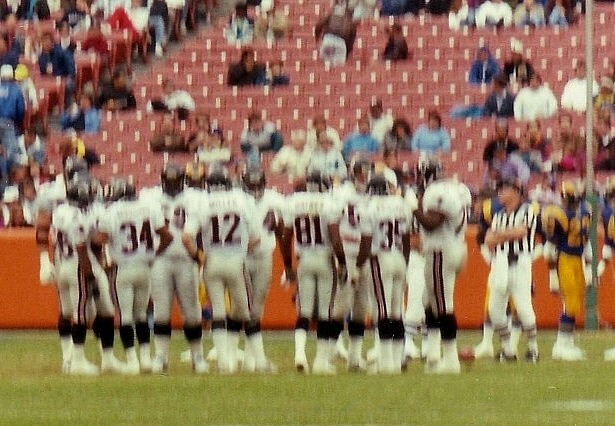
The Falcons playing against the Los Angeles Rams during a 1991 away game.

The 1991 team, also known as the "2 Legit 2 Quit" Falcons, as they appropriated the song by MC Hammer as their team theme song after several Falcons appeared in the accompanying music video. Hammer himself would make several appearances on the Falcons sideline during the season. Atlanta made the playoffs as the sixth seed with a 10–6 record, snapping a streak of eight consecutive losing seasons. Notable personalities on this team were CB Deion Sanders, WR Andre Rison, and CB Tim McKyer, a talented but brash player who had quickly worn out his welcome with the Miami Dolphins the year prior but emerged as a leader for Atlanta. Also new to the team was QB Brett Favre, drafted from Southern Mississippi during the off-season. Atlanta tied the San Francisco 49ers with a 10–6 record, but made it over them due to a Billy Joe Tolliver Hail Mary earlier that year. The Falcons made it to the second round of the playoffs by beating the New Orleans Saints at the Louisiana Superdome (27–20). The next week, they lost a rain-soaked blowout to the eventual Super Bowl champion Washington Redskins 24–7.

In 1992, the Falcons would move from the Atlanta–Fulton County Stadium to the Georgia Dome and finish with a 6–10 record. In the off-season, the team traded Brett Favre to the Green Bay Packers in exchange for a first-round draft pick.

For the 1993 season, Deion Sanders continued to be the star player of the Atlanta Falcons, picking off 7 passes while shutting down some of the league's top receivers. Despite Sanders's amazing performance, the Falcons finished once again with a 6–10 record. After the season coach Jerry Glanville was fired and replaced by June Jones.

TNT did a game from the Georgia Dome for the first time on October 17, as the Falcons beat the Rams 30–24.

== 1994–1996: June Jones era ==
The Falcons would lose Sanders to free agency in 1994, and they would also acquire QB Jeff George, who had managed to wear out his welcome in Indianapolis after being four seasons removed from being picked #1 overall in 1990. With these changes, the Falcons mildly improved to a 7–9 record.

The next year, with Jones's run and shoot offense firmly in place, George had a then-career season. In the final game of the 1995 season, the Falcons come from behind to beat the San Francisco 49ers 28–27 to secure a playoff spot. They would lose to the Green Bay Packers at Lambeau Field 37–20.

The Falcons would follow up their playoff appearance with a 3–13 record in 1996, in a season best-remembered for an argument caught on camera during a Sunday Night game between George and June Jones. George was benched after the incident, and both were gone by the end of the season.

== 1997–2000: Dan Reeves era ==
Jones would be replaced by former Broncos Coach (and Georgia native) Dan Reeves, who would lead the Falcons to a 7–9 record in 1997. Rankin Smith died at the age of 72 on the eve of a Sunday Night game against Carolina. This game aired on TNT, part of Time Warner's Turner Broadcasting System - which is based in Atlanta. In fact, this is the last NFL game aired on TNT to date.

=== 1998: First Super Bowl appearance ===
In the greatest season in franchise history to date, the 1998 Falcons shocked the league by posting a 14–2 regular season record and qualifying for Super Bowl XXXIII by upsetting the heavily favored Minnesota Vikings in the NFC Championship Game.

Featuring a balanced offense led by Pro Bowlers Chris Chandler and Jamal Anderson, as well as an aggressive and opportunistic defense, the Falcons sprinted to a promising 6–2 start. To that point, however, the team's success was generally regarded as a fluke, given the franchise's history, a weak schedule, and blowout road losses to two contending teams, the San Francisco 49ers and the New York Jets.

On November 8, 1998, the NFL finally began to take notice when the Falcons traveled to Foxboro Stadium and defeated the Patriots 41–10, at the same time snapping a streak of 22 consecutive losses at cold-weather sites in November and December that had dated back to 1982. It was in this game that TE O. J. Santiago introduced the famous "Dirty Bird" dance that became the team's trademark endzone celebration for that season.

The win at Foxboro significantly raised the team's profile before a week 11 confrontation with the hated San Francisco 49ers, from whom the Falcons had received some of their most embarrassing losses to throughout their history. Atlanta earned a 31–19 win over the 49ers before a packed Georgia Dome.

The Falcons won their final six games of the season, including a 24–17 week 16 triumph over the Detroit Lions which clinched Atlanta's first division title since 1980.

A major distraction hit Atlanta the day after a road win over the Saints, in the form of a quadruple-bypass heart surgery that their head coach Dan Reeves required. Assistant coach and former Rams head coach Rich Brooks would temporarily handle head coaching duties in Reeves's absence, winning both of their last two games of the season.

The Falcons entered the 1998 playoffs as the #2 seed in the NFC, becoming the first 14-win team not to receive home field advantage throughout the playoffs. However, they did receive a bye into the divisional round.

Three weeks after his surgery and two weeks after being re-admitted to the hospital due to an accelerated heartbeat, Reeves returned to work full-time and would return to the sideline for their division-round showdown with the 49ers, who were coming off of a comeback victory over the Green Bay Packers. The Dome was again filled to capacity as the Falcons charged to a 10–0 first half lead and held on for 20–18 victory, advancing to their first NFC Championship game in franchise history.

==== 1998 NFC Championship game ====
The Falcons played in the Metrodome on January 17, 1998, facing the league's most feared offense, the top-seeded Minnesota Vikings. The Vikings were the highest scoring team in NFL history at the time, wielding an explosive, record-setting passing attack powered by Randall Cunningham and Minnesota's trio of wide receivers: Randy Moss, Jake Reed, and Cris Carter. The Vikings finished the regular season 15–1, so despite Atlanta's impressive 14–2 regular season, they were heavy underdogs heading into Minnesota. Few pundits believed the Falcons to be contenders, with virtually none predicting a win.

The Falcons' offense prepared all week for the deafening cacophony of the Metrodome, and promptly opened the game with a touchdown drive that quieted the crowd and propelled the team to an early 7–0 lead. However, the Vikings responded with a 5-play, 80-yard touchdown drive of their own. Minnesota would proceed to tally 20 unanswered points in the first half, pressing the Falcons against the ropes with a 20–7 lead.

The pivotal moment in the contest came with 1:17 left in the first half. The Vikings had just taken over from a punt on their own 18. High on a dominating first half, they chose to throw the ball in an attempt to put the game away before halftime. Opting for three consecutive downfield passes, Minnesota was dumbfounded when DE Chuck Smith managed to beat Todd Steussie on 3rd down to force a Randall Cunningham fumble. The Falcons recovered on the Minnesota 14 and cashed in with a Chandler to Terance Mathis touchdown on the next play, mending the rift to a more manageable 20–14 going into the break.

In the second half and with the momentum completely reversed the Falcons scored the only points of the 3rd quarter on a 27-yard Morten Andersen field goal to make the score 20–17. The Vikings responded, converting three third downs in a 15-play, 82-yard drive, and posting their only points of the second half on a Cunningham to Matthew Hatchette touchdown pass 1:19 into the fourth quarter. The Falcons countered with another field goal set up by a 70-yard strike from Chandler to Mathis. The score was 27–20 with 11:02 remaining.

From here, the teams exchanged possessions twice. The clock running dry, Minnesota managed to break through on what appeared to be a game-clinching 55-yard drive to the Atlanta 21. Stopped on 3rd down with 2:07 left, the Vikings summoned Pro Bowl kicker Gary Anderson, who had made NFL history that season by converting all 39 of his field goal attempts. However, Anderson's 38 yard boot hooked wide left which left the Falcons still alive and the Vikings and the Metrodome faithful perplexed by a foreboding change in momentum. That momentum would spark the most important drive in franchise history.

The Falcons had the ball and two minutes to span the 71 yards separating them from an improbable comeback. In perhaps the finest moment of his injury-prone and inconsistent career, QB Chris Chandler directed an 8 play drive, concluding with a 16-yard touchdown pass to Terance Mathis with 49 seconds left. Nonplussed, and squeamish from the disaster at the end of the first half, Minnesota coach Dennis Green then chose to run out the clock and try his chances in overtime.

The crowd, which had been collectively eviscerated by the Anderson miss and Chandler's subsequent heroics, quickly took heart as the Vikings won the overtime coin flip. The celebrated Minnesota offense would decide its own fate.

The game became a struggle for field position in the early part of the period, as both teams failed to break the 50-yard line on their initial possession. The Vikings' second possession stalled at their own 39, a 52-yard Mitch Berger punt subsequently pinning Atlanta deep in its own territory.

Beached at their own 9, the Falcon offense mounted a final frantic charge. Led once again by the clutch passing of Chandler, Atlanta surged 70 yards in a breakneck 10-play drive, encountering only a single 3rd down which came on the final play of the game. After centering the ball on a 2-yard Jamal Anderson rush to the Minnesota 21, the Falcons tapped kicker Morten Andersen for the game-winning field goal. The Metrodome waxed breathless as Andersen split the uprights from 38 yards, vaulting the Falcons to the win and sending them to the Super Bowl for the first time in franchise history. It also set off one of the biggest celebrations in the city's history as thousands packed Hartsfield–Jackson Atlanta International Airport upon their arrival in town later that night and thousands more swamped the highways during their convoy to team headquarters.

==== Super Bowl XXXIII ====
In the two-week interval between the NFC Championship game and Super Bowl XXXIII, media attention was focused mostly upon the Falcons' opponent, the Denver Broncos, their retiring quarterback John Elway, and former Denver coach Dan Reeves's relationship with Elway, which was at times contentious during his tenure as Broncos coach. Falcons Pro Bowl CB Ray Buchanan also jokingly guaranteed a win to a reporter, with this statement being blown out of proportion by the overzealous media. Days later, Buchanan attracted further attention when he greeted the media wearing a dog collar to represent the Falcons' status as 8 1/2 point underdogs.

The biggest story for either team broke the night before the game. Falcons Pro Bowl free safety Eugene Robinson, who had just that morning received the Bart Starr Award for his "high moral character," was arrested for soliciting an undercover police officer $40 for oral sex on Biscayne Boulevard in downtown Miami. Robinson would play in the game, but he would turn out to be a liability, blowing a coverage on a key play in the first half, and missing a tackle that resulted in a fourth-quarter touchdown.

Super Bowl XXXIII was a novel event for Falcons fans and players, but was a disappointing end to what had theretofore been a dream season. The Falcons offense moved the ball consistently on the Broncos throughout the game, but had several mishaps within Denver territory, allowing the Broncos offense to pick apart the Atlanta defense and pull away to a 17–3 lead in the first half. A Morten Andersen field goal brought the Falcons within 17–6 going into halftime, but the second half was punctuated by two key interceptions thrown by Chris Chandler, which allowed the Broncos to pull away to a 31–6 lead. By the end of the game, the Falcons had driven within the Broncos 30-yard line seven times, yet had only managed to score 13 points with 5 turnovers. The Falcons scored two late touchdowns, one on a 94-yard kickoff return by Tim Dwight, to make the final score 34–19.

Despite the embarrassing finish, the 1998 Falcons are the most celebrated team in franchise history. That year, the Falcons set franchise records for wins (14) and points scored (442), with RB Jamal Anderson breaking the NFL record for carries in a season (410) and the team record for rushing yards (1,846). The team also sent six players to the Pro Bowl, the second highest total in team history. Atlanta was also the first dome team in league history to make the Super Bowl.

=== 1999–2000 ===
After the adrenaline rush of the 1998 season, Atlanta football would cool down when RB Jamal Anderson endured an early season-ending torn ACL injury. The team tumbled to a 5–11 record in 1999, and an even worse 4–12 record in 2000.

== 2000–2006: Michael Vick era ==
=== 2001 ===
In the 2001 NFL draft, the Falcons orchestrated a trade with the San Diego Chargers to attain the #1 overall draft pick with which they chose the electrifying sophomore quarterback Michael Vick out of Virginia Tech. The Chargers used the #5 pick to acquire running back LaDainian Tomlinson. The Falcons chose to keep veteran quarterback Chris Chandler as the starter to allow Vick some time to learn the system. The team finished the year with a 7–9 record and missed the playoffs.

=== 2002 ===
Starting this season, the Falcons became part of the NFC South division, after 30+ seasons in the geographically inaccurate NFC West.

Vick became the full-time starting quarterback in 2002. That year, the Falcons recorded an NFL-best eight-game unbeaten streak (7–0–1). During the streak, they recorded huge victories over division rivals the New Orleans Saints, who started the year 6–1, and the Carolina Panthers (two shutout victories, 30–0 and 41–0). They also overcame a 17-point deficit in the fourth quarter to force a 34–34 tie with the Pittsburgh Steelers en route to a 9–6–1 record and a trip to the playoffs. Also during the season, Vick set records for both the most rushing yards in a game by a quarterback and longest run by a quarterback, showing that the skills he had shown in his college career at Virginia Tech were not a fake. They immediately scored a major upset on January 4, 2003, by becoming the first road team in NFL history to defeat the Green Bay Packers in a playoff game at Lambeau Field, winning 27–7. Their season would end the next week in Philadelphia as the Philadelphia Eagles won, 20–6.

=== 2003 ===
As things were looking up, disaster struck swiftly in the next season. During the 2003 preseason against the Baltimore Ravens, Vick broke his leg and was forced to miss the first twelve games of the season. Without him, the Falcons were crippled and they suffered through a 5–11 season, despite Vick going 3–1 as starter at the end of the season. With three games left in the season, head coach Dan Reeves was fired and defensive coordinator Wade Phillips was named his replacement on an interim basis. The Falcons drafted Virginia Tech cornerback DeAngelo Hall with the eighth pick in the 2004 NFL draft.

In 2003, the Falcons unveiled new uniforms and their current logo.

=== 2004 ===
In 2004, with the Falcons being buoyed by the return of Michael Vick and energized by their new head coach Jim L. Mora, they would go 11–5 and easily win the NFC South. Having a first round bye, the Falcons would face the St. Louis Rams in the divisional round, who had shut them out 36–0 the previous year on national television. Buoyed by a team record-324 yards rushing and over 150 punt return yardage by Allen Rossum they advanced to the NFC Championship game by embarrassing the Rams 47–17. However, in their second NFC title game appearance, they were denied another trip to the Super Bowl, as they lost to the Philadelphia Eagles, 27–10. After the season, Vick signed a 10-year, $130 million contract with a $37 million signing bonus—the richest contract in NFL history at the time.

=== 2005 ===
During the 2005 season the Falcons started 6–2, but injuries on defense caused them to finish the second half 2–6. Bright spots included the Falcons ending their Monday Night Football jinx by going 3–0, and on Thursday, November 24, the Falcons played on Thanksgiving Day for the first time in franchise history, beating the Detroit Lions 27–7. On the next-to-last game of the regular season, the Falcons were eliminated from playoff contention with a 27–24 overtime loss against the Tampa Bay Buccaneers. The Falcons finished 8–8 and once again failed to attain back-to-back winning seasons.

=== 2006 ===
The Falcons started this season successfully with two wins against the Carolina Panthers and Tampa Bay Buccaneers, but lost to the New Orleans Saints on Monday Night Football, giving them a record of 2–1. The next week, the team came back and won their game against the Arizona Cardinals 32–10, with Jerious Norwood, a rookie running back from Mississippi State University, running for over 100 yards and Morten Andersen hitting all 5 of his field goals. Andersen, one of the most prolific kickers in NFL history and a member of the 1998 Super Bowl team, had been re-signed by the club September 19, ending punter Michael Koenen's audition as the sole kicker on the team (Koenen continued to placekick in long-yardage situations).

The next week, the team had a bye and prepared to face the New York Giants. The Falcons would lose to the Giants 27–14. The only bright spot of the game was a 90-yard 3rd-quarter touchdown run by Warrick Dunn, the longest touchdown run in Atlanta Falcons history.

The Atlanta Falcons hoped to bounce back the next week against the Pittsburgh Steelers, and they did so with a huge game. In a shootout rivaling the following week's Indianapolis Colts-Denver Broncos game, the Falcons beat the Steelers 41–38 in overtime as Morten Andersen kicked a game-winning 32-yard field goal. Falcons quarterback Michael Vick had a career-high 4 touchdown passes, including 3 to star tight tend Alge Crumpler. Both teams combined for 9 touchdown passes and 872 yards of total offense. With the win, the Falcons improved to 4–2.

In week 8, the Falcons defeated the Cincinnati Bengals 29–27. Vick showed that the previous game was no fluke, going 19 of 27 for 291 yards and three touchdowns, as well as scrambling for 55 yards. A third-quarter touchdown pass to third-checkdown receiver, fullback Justin Griffith, chilled defensive coordinators league-wide and thrilled Falcons fans, as Vick demonstrated field awareness, patience, elusiveness, and precision passing under pressure.

The 5–2 Falcons next traveled to Ford Field in Detroit to face the Detroit Lions, where they fell to 5–3. The Falcons suffered a similar fate to both the Cleveland Browns and the Baltimore Ravens bringing their record to an even 5–5 on the season. The Falcons suffered another loss to the New Orleans Saints on November 26 (31–13) to cause their record for the season drop to 5–6, but more importantly to let their losing streak continue on to 4 games. The next week they defeated the Washington Redskins in an away game with a score of 24–14. In that game the Falcons were down 14–0 but came back and scored 24 unanswered points to win the game. A 69-yard run for a touchdown by rookie Jerious Norwood helped seal the victory. The next week, the Falcons beat the Tampa Bay Buccaneers, keeping hopes alive for a playoff berth. However, they then lost their next two games, against the Dallas Cowboys and the Carolina Panthers.

Even with a 7–8 record, the Falcons were not eliminated from the playoffs until, in week 17, the New York Giants beat the Washington Redskins. The Falcons' last game was a meaningless loss to a second-string Philadelphia Eagles team, sealing their record for the season at a losing 7–9. The next day (January 1, 2007), the Falcons fired their head coach, Jim L. Mora; he was replaced by Louisville head coach Bobby Petrino on January 7.

== 2007: Vick suspended ==
=== 2007 ===
The Falcons spent most of the 2007 season trying to overcome the controversy surrounding Vick and his involvement in an illegal dog fighting ring. Under considerable pressure, the NFL barred Vick from attending training camp pending its own investigation into the matter. For all intents and purposes, the Falcons' season effectively ended when Vick was arraigned on federal dog fighting charges on July 26. The terms of his bail barred him from leaving Virginia for any reason before the November 26 trial. With Vick's absence, journeyman quarterbacks Joey Harrington and Byron Leftwich were used to plug the hole at quarterback. Vick pleaded guilty on August 20; on the same day the NFL suspended him indefinitely. The Falcons are trying to recover part of his signing bonus, based on evidence he used it to fund the gambling side of the dog fighting operation. Blank later stated that while he felt Vick should be allowed back into the NFL, he will probably not play another down for the Falcons again.

Petrino had revamped the offense in hopes of making Vick a more complete quarterback. However, with Vick on the sidelines, Petrino's game plan didn't seem to fit on the field or in the locker room, with veteran players Alge Crumpler and DeAngelo Hall voicing their displeasure. Petrino later resigned just 13 games into the season to coach the Arkansas Razorbacks. Petrino resigned the day after Vick was sentenced to 23 months in prison and also a day after Petrino coached the Falcons in a 34–14 loss to the New Orleans Saints on Monday Night Football.

Without Vick, the Falcons appeared to be a rudderless team. They finished their troubled 2007 season with a 44–41 victory over the Seattle Seahawks, ending the year at 4–12. The offseason brought change to the team's front office, as Thomas Dimitroff was hired to replace Rich McKay at the general manager position.

== 2008–2021: Matt Ryan era ==
=== 2008–2015 ===
2008

On January 23, 2008, Jacksonville Jaguars defensive coach Mike Smith was named the Falcons' new head coach. Matt Ryan, a quarterback from Boston College, was drafted third overall to be the new face of the franchise. Free agent Michael Turner was also acquired to help in the run game. Defying expectations, the Falcons managed an 11–5 season in 2008 and earned a wild card playoff berth. They did not get beyond that however, as they lost a 30–24 match against the eventual NFC champion Arizona Cardinals.

2009

In 2009, the Falcons suffered numerous devastating injuries to defensive players and to Turner (ankle) and Ryan (toe). The Week 13 game against the Philadelphia Eagles saw Michael Vick return to play his former team, in which he scored two touchdowns, one passing and one rushing. Atlanta was very nearly shut out, but in the closing seconds of the game scored a touchdown and brought the final score to 34–7. The following week, the team lost a close match against the eventual Super Bowl XLIV champion New Orleans Saints, which mathematically excluded them from the playoffs. Nonetheless, Atlanta managed to win their final three games and end the year with a 9–7 record, the first time in its history the team achieved back-to-back winning seasons.

2010

The Falcons lost their 2010 opener to the eventual AFC champion Pittsburgh Steelers before crushing the Arizona Cardinals at home in Week 2. Atlanta then played its first divisional match of the season against the defending Super Bowl XLIV champion New Orleans Saints. In a closely fought game, the Falcons beat the Saints 27–24 with two minutes left in overtime. Then followed a 16–14 win over the struggling San Francisco 49ers. After games with the Cleveland Browns (a 20–10 win) and the Philadelphia Eagles (a 31–17 loss), they won a key division match against the Tampa Bay Buccaneers in Week 9 to claim a lead in the NFC South, putting them at 6–2 at the halfway point of their season. In the 2010 Thursday Night Football opener, the Falcons donned throwback uniforms and defeated the Baltimore Ravens 26–21 in a highly anticipated match-up of 6–2 teams, and the first meeting of the top two quarterback picks of the 2008 draft, in Ryan and Joe Flacco. Ryan set career highs for attempts and completions, going 32 for 50, and clinching the Falcons' first 7–2 record since the 1998 Super Bowl season. The Falcons secured their third straight winning season, a franchise first, with a win over the St. Louis Rams (34–17), and a victory in a highly anticipated game with the Green Bay Packers (20–17), which was a close game all the way up to the end, when kicker Matt Bryant sealed the game with a 47-yard field goal with 13 seconds on the clock, bringing the Falcons to an NFC-best 9–2 record. The next week the Falcons defeated their divisional rivals, the Tampa Bay Buccaneers 28–24, improving their record to an NFC best 10–2. Week 14 saw the first of two late-season matchups with the struggling Carolina Panthers. The Falcons got up 14–0 early in the game and went on to cruise to a 31–10 victory, raising their record to an NFC-best 11–2. Week 15 took the Falcons to the Pacific Northwest against the Seattle Seahawks. After a quick start by the Seahawks, the Falcons took control with a key touchdown pass late in the first half and a fumble recovery for a touchdown on the Seahawks' first possession of the second half to go up 24–10, eventually winning 34–18. The win (followed by a New York Giants loss) secured a playoff berth for the Falcons with two games left. With only one win needed in the final two games to clinch everything, Week 16 set up a Monday Night showdown with the defending Super Bowl champion New Orleans Saints. A low-scoring affair ended with the Saints pulling out a 17–14 win. Week 17 brought in the struggling Carolina Panthers and an easy win for the Falcons, 31–10. The victory clinched the NFC South Division title (only their fourth division title in the team's history) and clinching home-field advantage in the playoffs by claiming the number one seed in the NFC. However, their season had a disappointing end, with the Falcons suffering a loss at home in the divisional round of the playoffs to the eventual Super Bowl XLV champion Green Bay Packers by a margin of 48–21.

2011

In 2011, Atlanta finished 10-6 and earned the fifth seed in the NFC playoffs. The Falcons failed to get out of the first round, however, as the eventual Super Bowl XLVI champion New York Giants defeated them 24–2, with Atlanta's only points coming off of a safety.

2012

In 2012, the Falcons won the NFC South and had the conference's best record at 13–3. Matt Ryan had the best season of his career, throwing for 4,719 yards and 32 touchdowns. Ryan directed an explosive passing attack featuring 1,000-yard receivers Roddy White (1,351 yards) and Julio Jones (1,198 yards), and future Hall of Fame tight end Tony Gonzalez, who led the Falcons with 93 receptions. In the playoffs, Atlanta narrowly defeated the Seattle Seahawks 30–28 in the divisional round after blowing a 27–7 3rd-quarter lead. The Seahawks took a 28–27 lead with 31 seconds left, but Ryan quickly led the Falcons downfield to set up Matt Bryant's game-winning 49-yard field goal with 8 seconds remaining. Atlanta would go on to host the NFC Championship Game and face the San Francisco 49ers. Just like the week before, the Falcons jumped out to an early lead (17–0) and could not hold onto it. This time, they lost 28–24.

2013

In 2013, Atlanta slipped to a 4–12 record, their first losing season since 2007. Injuries were also the story of the 2013 season. This was Tony Gonzalez' last year in the NFL.

2014

In 2014, Atlanta improved by two games, and thanks to an extremely weak division, remained in playoff contention until the final week of the season, when their divisional rival, the Carolina Panthers, defeated them 34–3. The Falcons' final record that season was 6–10. After the season, Mike Smith was fired and replaced by Dan Quinn.

2015

The 2015 season marked the Falcons' 50th season of play in the NFL. The Falcons got out to a fast start in 2015 with 5 straight victories before losing their first game to their archrivals, the New Orleans Saints on the road on Thursday Night Football. They bounced back to defeat the Tennessee Titans but then went into a tailspin, losing six straight games before they finally defeated the Jacksonville Jaguars in Week 15. Then in Week 16, they scored a major upset by defeating the eventual NFC champion Carolina Panthers, who had beaten them 38-0 two weeks before, by the score of 20–13. This spoiled Carolina's chance at a perfect season. Sadly for the Falcons, they were eliminated from playoff contention for the third straight year after the Minnesota Vikings defeated the New York Giants later that day. They finished the regular season with a 20–17 loss at home to their archrivals, the New Orleans Saints, giving them a final record of 8-8.

=== 2016: 28–3 ===
The 2016 season was the Falcons 25th and final season at the Georgia Dome. They finished with an 11–5 record, earning them a first-round bye in the playoffs. Matt Ryan was named NFL MVP after the season. After defeating the Seattle Seahawks in the divisional round 36–20 and blowing out the Green Bay Packers 44–21 in the title game, the Falcons advanced to the Super Bowl for the first time in 18 years. Against the 14–2 Patriots, the Falcons started off strong, pulling away with a 28–3 lead nearing the end of the third quarter. However, Tom Brady and the Patriots mounted an incredible comeback, scoring 25 unanswered points to send the game into overtime for the first time in Super Bowl history. The Patriots received the ball in overtime, and drove down the field for the game-winning score, shocking the Falcons as they went home inches from the Lombardi Trophy.

=== 2017–2021 ===
2017

After the Falcons' heartbreaking Super Bowl loss the year before, the Falcons returned in 2017 for a second shot at the Lombardi Trophy. 2017 was also the opening of Mercedes-Benz Stadium, the new home for the Falcons. One of their regular season games was also against the Patriots in a game known as "the Fog Bowl II." Overall, the Falcons finished 10–6, qualifying for a playoff spot despite being placed 3rd in the division. In the wild card round, the Falcons beat the 11–5 Los Angeles Rams 26–13. It was the first time in franchise history winning playoff games in back-to-back years. However, the Falcons season was stopped short the following week against the Eagles, 10–15.

2018

In 2018, the Atlanta Falcons were expected by many to be the first team to play the Super Bowl in their home stadium. However, injuries plagued the team throughout the season as they fell to 4–9 and, with a Vikings win the following week, were mathematically eliminated from postseason contention. However, the Falcons were able to win their final three games to finish 7–9.

2019

In the 2019 season, Atlanta wasn't ready to give up. Nevertheless, they suffered a six-game losing streak following a week 2 win over the Eagles. Their 1–7 start was the worst since 2003. However, after their bye week in week 9, the Falcons caught fire, winning six of their final eight games to equal their 7–9 record from the previous year. In their season finale against the Buccaneers, the Falcons finished the game with a pick-six seven seconds into overtime, marking the shortest overtime in NFL history.

2020

After their phenomenal finish at the end of last year's season, the Falcons expected to do really well this season. However, things took a turn for the worse as the Falcons started off with five straight losses, their first such start since 1997. Two of these losses (in back-to-back weeks) included fourth-quarter leads of 15+ blown by the Falcons. The Falcons ended up firing head coach Dan Quinn after a Week 5 loss to the Panthers. Interim head coach Raheem Morris led the team to a 4–2 record over their next six games before the Falcons lost their final five games to finish last in the NFC at 4–12. On January 15, 2021, the Falcons hired Arthur Smith to be their head coach for the season.

2021

For the first time since 2010, longtime receiver Julio Jones was not on the roster, as he was traded to the Tennessee Titans on June 6, 2021. The Falcons drafted tight end Kyle Pitts with the 4th overall pick in the 2021 NFL Draft. The Falcons improved on last year, ending the season at 7–10. The 2021 season was the Falcons' last season with Matt Ryan as he was traded to the Indianapolis Colts on March 21, 2022.

== 2022–present: Post Matt Ryan era ==
2022

The Falcons matched their record from last season at 7–10. One highlight is the fact that the Falcons have upset the NFC South champions Tampa Bay Buccaneers in the season finale to win their first and only game against Tom Brady.

2023

After a surprising 2–0 start, the Falcons not only fail to make the playoffs but would match their 7–10 record from the last 2 seasons. On January 8, 2024, head coach Arthur Smith was fired after 3 seasons.

2024

On January 25, 2024, the Falcons named Raheem Morris as their full time head coach after being the interim for the 2020 season. The Falcons finished the seasons 8–9, an improvement from the three previous seasons stuck at 7–10.

== See also ==
- List of Atlanta Falcons seasons
