= Randy Johnson (quarterback) =

American football player (1944–2009)

- Johnson with the Atlanta Falcons

No. 11, 12, 16
- Position: Quarterback

Personal information
- Born: June 17, 1944; San Antonio, Texas, U.S.
- Died: September 17, 2009 (aged 65); Brevard, North Carolina, U.S.
- Listed height: 6 ft 3 in (1.91 m)
- Listed weight: 205 lb (93 kg)

Career information
- High school: Sam Houston (San Antonio)
- College: Texas A&I
- NFL draft: 1966: 1st round, 16th overall pick
- AFL draft: 1966: 4th round, 27th overall pick

Career history
- Atlanta Falcons (1966–1970); New York Giants (1971–1973); The Hawaiians (1974); Washington Redskins (1975); Green Bay Packers (1976)

Awards and highlights
- All-WFL (1974); First-team Little All-American (1965)

Career NFL statistics
- Passing attempts: 1,286
- Passing completions: 647
- Completion percentage: 50.3%
- TD–INT: 51–90
- Passing yards: 8,329
- Passer rating: 55.1
- Rushing yards: 573
- Rushing touchdowns: 10
- Stats at Pro Football Reference

Randolph Klaus Johnson (June 17, 1944 – September 17, 2009) was an American professional football player. He was the starting quarterback for the Atlanta Falcons in their inaugural season of 1966. He also had brief stints with the New York Giants, Washington Redskins, and Green Bay Packers. In 1974, he played with The Hawaiians of the World Football League (WFL).

== Early life and college ==
Born and raised in San Antonio, Texas, Johnson graduated from its Sam Houston High School in 1962. He played college football at Texas A&I in Kingsville (now Texas A&M–Kingsville), teammates with guard Gene Upshaw.

Johnson is a member of the Texas A&M Kingsville Javelina Hall of Fame. A two time All-American in 1964 and 1965. He led the Javelinas in passing in all four years he played and led the team in rushing in 1964. Johnson was the Lone Star Conference MVP in 1964 after leading the conference in passing. He was also the MVP in the 1965 Blue-Grey Classic, MVP in the Coaches All-America game and one of the top performers in the Senior Bowl.

== Professional career ==
Johnson entered the 1966 NFL draft and became the first Texas A&I player to ever be selected in the first round (16th overall). He was also selected in the fourth round of the AFL draft by the Denver Broncos. Johnson would start the first ever game for the Falcons at quarterback on September 11, 1966 against the Los Angeles Rams. He went 9-of-25 for 154 yards with a touchdown and two interceptions while delivering the first Falcon points on a 53-yard pass to Gary Barnes and later delivered the first rushing touchdown on a three-yard run. Johnson started 11 of the 14 games for the team, who won just three games. He threw for 1,795 yards with 12 touchdowns to 21 interceptions with a 47.8 passer rating. The 1967 season would see him start 12 games and go 1–10–1 while throwing for 1,620 yards with 10 touchdowns to 21 interceptions with a 47.8 passer rating. The 1968 season saw him start the first five games of the season before he was taken out for Bob Berry. Johnson would not start again until Week 12 and started once more in Week 14 to close the year out. In eight games, he threw for 892 yards with 2 touchdowns to 10 interceptions.

Johnson started just five games of the 1969 season, splitting time with Berry and Bruce Lemmerman, and he started just two games of the subsequent season, his last as a Falcon. He moved over to the New York Giants, where he played sparingly in his first two seasons there before being thrust into starting duty for seven games of the 1973 season, which saw him go 1–6. He threw for 1,279 yards with 7 touchdowns to 8 interceptions. He played one season with the Honolulu Hawaiians of the short-lived World Football League in 1974 before making two starts for the Washington Redskins in 1975 and then closing out his career with one start in 1976 for the Green Bay Packers. In his last start and game as a professional on December 12, 1976, he went 16-of-25 for 165 yards with an interception and a rushing touchdown in a 24-20 victory. Over his professional career, he completed 647 of 1,286 passes (a 50.3-percentage) for 51 touchdowns and 90 interceptions while going 10–38–1 as a starter. He also ran for 573 yards and 10 touchdowns over his career.

== NFL career statistics ==
Legend
**Bold**	Career high

Year	Team	Games			Passing									Rushing					Sacks	
Year	Team	GP	GS	Record	Cmp	Att	Pct	Yds	Y/A	Lng	TD	Int	Rtg	Att	Yds	Avg	Lng	TD	Sck	Yds
1966	ATL	14	11	3-8	129	**295**	43.7	**1,795**	6.1	53	**12**	**21**	47.8	**35**	142	4.1	21	**4**	26	236
1967	ATL	14	12	1-10-1	**142**	288	49.3	1,620	5.6	**82**	10	**21**	47.8	24	**144**	6.0	17	1	**34**	**311**
1968	ATL	8	7	1-6	73	156	46.8	892	5.7	71	2	10	42.5	11	97	**8.8**	**26**	1	20	153
1969	ATL	6	5	2-3	51	93	54.8	788	8.5	65	8	5	89.4	11	55	5.0	13	1	18	152
1970	ATL	4	2	1-1	40	72	55.6	443	6.2	34	2	8	43.7	7	21	3.0	14	0	16	148
1971	NYG	5	1	0-1	41	74	55.4	477	6.4	45	3	3	71.7	6	29	4.8	17	0	13	116
1972	NYG	4	1	0-1	10	17	58.8	230	**13.5**	63	3	3	**103.2**	9	26	2.9	9	1	2	10
1973	NYG	9	7	1-6	99	177	55.9	1,279	7.2	48	7	8	73.2	4	24	6.0	11	1	19	134
1975	WAS	8	2	0-2	41	79	51.9	556	7.0	36	4	10	52.0	2	10	5.0	10	0	2	19
1976	GNB	3	1	1-0	21	35	**60.0**	249	7.1	45	0	1	69.8	5	25	5.0	11	1	2	23
Career		75	49	10-38-1	647	1,286	50.3	8,329	6.5	82	51	90	55.1	114	573	5.0	26	10	152	1,302

== Personal life ==
Within a year of his retirement from the league, he went through divorce with Pennye Wheeler, who he had married in college and had two children with. He also filed for bankruptcy around this time. He moved back to Texas after the divorce and began drinking heavily to cope with the loneliness, as he also had agreed to cut off all contact with his then growing two daughters, a decision that he said was on his part "the worst thing that ever happened to me." He also did not keep contact with a son he had conceived from a previous relationship in high school. His attempts at rehab and undergoing psychological care went nowhere for parts of the 1980s and 1990s. Suffering from bone cancer and diabetes, he moved to North Carolina in late 2007 with an acquaintance that set him up with a sparse living space akin to a shed. He died September 17, 2009, in Brevard, North Carolina in what police deemed to be of natural causes. When contact was made with Johnson's ex-wife a few days later, it was decided to bury Johnson in Cuero, Texas, where he and Wheeler had gotten married.
