= Parade, South Dakota =

Unincorporated community in South Dakota, U.S.

Coordinates: 45°01′26″N 101°06′17″W

Parade is an unincorporated community in Dewey County, in the U.S. state of South Dakota.

== History ==
A post office called Parade was established in 1923. The community's name is a corruption of the name of George Paradis, a French settler.

== Notable people ==
- Norm Van Brocklin, football player and coach
- Oren L. Lesmeister, Minority Whip of the South Dakota House of Representatives
