= Leo Carroll (American football) =

American football player (born 1944)

No. 67, 89
- Position: Defensive end

Personal information
- Born: February 16, 1944; Alhambra, California, U.S.
- Died: January 30, 2016 (aged 71); U.S.
- Listed height: 6 ft 7 in (2.01 m)
- Listed weight: 250 lb (113 kg)

Career information
- High school: Alhambra
- College: Glendale CC (1962-1963); Tulsa (1964); San Diego State (1965-1966)
- NFL draft: 1967: 2nd round, 31st overall pick

Career history
- Atlanta Falcons (1967); Green Bay Packers (1968); Washington Redskins (1969–1970)

Career NFL statistics
- Fumble recoveries: 2
- Sacks: 2
- Stats at Pro Football Reference

Leo Henry Carroll (born February 16, 1944) is an American former professional football player who was a defensive end in the National Football League (NFL) for the Green Bay Packers and the Washington Redskins. He played college football at the University of Tulsa, San Diego State University and Glendale Community College. Carroll was selected 31st overall in the second round of the 1967 NFL/AFL draft by the Atlanta Falcons

Leo was the owner of Carroll's Brake Service in Alhambra, CA, as was his father before him, and now his sons. He graduated from Emery Park Elementary in Alhambra in 1958 and Alhambra High School in 1962.
