= Jim Weatherford =

American football player (born 1946)

No. 45, 42
- Position: Defensive back

Personal information
- Born: August 16, 1946 (age 80); Athens, Georgia, U.S.
- Listed height: 5 ft 11 in (1.80 m)
- Listed weight: 186 lb (84 kg)

Career information
- High school: Dalton (Dalton, Georgia)
- College: Tennessee (1965-1968)
- NFL draft: 1969: 15th round, 366th overall pick

Career history
- Atlanta Falcons (1969)

Awards and highlights
- First-team All-American (1968); First-team All-SEC (1968)

Career NFL statistics
- Interceptions: 1
- Fumble recoveries: 3
- Touchdowns: 1
- Stats at Pro Football Reference

James Earl Weatherford (born August 16, 1946) is an American former professional football player who was a defensive back for the Atlanta Falcons of the National Football League (NFL). He played college football for the Tennessee Volunteers. Weatherford was selected by the Falcons in the 15th round of the 1969 NFL draft with the 366th overall pick. In Week 5 of the 1969 season, he had a 74-yard defensive fumble return for a touchdown in a victory over the San Francisco 49ers.
