= Steve Duich =

American football player (born 1946)

No. 65, 63, 60
- Position: Guard

Personal information
- Born: February 28, 1946 (age 80); Long Beach, California, U.S.
- Listed height: 6 ft 3 in (1.91 m)
- Listed weight: 248 lb (112 kg)

Career information
- High school: St. Augustine (San Diego, California)
- College: San Diego State (1966-1967)
- NFL draft: 1968: 5th round, 121st overall pick

Career history
- Green Bay Packers (1968)*; Atlanta Falcons (1968); Washington Redskins (1969); BC Lions (1971)
- * Offseason or practice squad member only

Career NFL statistics
- Games played: 23
- Games started: 4
- Stats at Pro Football Reference

Steven John Duich (born February 28, 1946) is an American former professional football player who was a guard in the National Football League (NFL) for the Atlanta Falcons and Washington Redskins. He played college football for the San Diego State Aztecs.

== NFL career ==
Duich was selected by the Green Bay Packers with the 121st overall pick in the fifth round of the 1968 NFL/AFL draft. The Packers had obtained this pick on July 30, 1967, in a trade with the Pittsburgh Steelers. In exchange, the Steelers received quarterback Kent Nix. Exactly one year later, on July 30, 1968, the Packers traded again. This time, they traded Duich to the Atlanta Falcons for kicker Wade Traynham, who the Packers cut on August 26, 1968.
