= Ernie Wheelwright (running back) =

American football player (1939–2001)

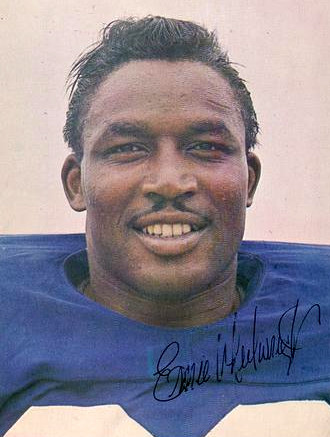
- Wheelwright in 1965

No. 30, 39
- Position: Running back

Personal information
- Born: November 28, 1939; Columbus, Ohio, U.S.
- Died: May 1, 2001 (aged 61); Las Vegas, Nevada, U.S.
- Listed height: 6 ft 3 in (1.91 m)
- Listed weight: 235 lb (107 kg)

Career information
- High school: Columbus (OH) Central
- College: Southern Illinois (1959-1960)
- NFL draft: 1964: undrafted

Career history

Playing
- New York Giants (1964–1965); Atlanta Falcons (1966–1967); New Orleans Saints (1967-1970)

Coaching
- Southern California Sun (1974-1975) Backfield coach

Career NFL statistics
- Rushing yards: 1,426
- Rushing average: 3.7
- Receptions: 54
- Receiving yards: 531
- Total touchdowns: 16
- Stats at Pro Football Reference

Ernest Lamour 'Wheels' Wheelwright (November 28, 1939 – May 1, 2001) was an American football player.

Wheelwright attended Southern Illinois University and served in the 101st Airborne Division (a.k.a. the Screaming Eagles). In 1962, he led the Fort Campbell football team to a 14–10 victory over Lackland Air Force Base in the Missile Bowl. He then played running back for the New York Giants (1964–65), Atlanta Falcons (1966–67) and the New Orleans Saints (1967–70) of the National Football League. He rushed for 1426 yards and scored 16 touchdowns (9 rushing and 7 receiving) in 79 games.

Wheelwright was also owner of one of Atlanta's premier nightclubs in the 1960s, the Pink Pussycat Club. 'Wheels' hosted many visiting black artists and had the opportunity to cut a record 'Beggin You Back' for the local Gaye label owned by Johnny Brooks. (Note: J T. Brooks who was also an engineer and record producer had opened his own facility in Atlanta in 1964. Wheelwright's disc was one of at least eight on Gaye. In addition Brooks was owner of the gospel label Sounds of Atlanta whose roster included Little Jimmy Dempsey, Big Chief Weatherington, the Soul Searchers and The Blackwood Singers.) In 1970 the NFL asked Wheelwright, then with the New Orleans Saints, to sell his interest on the grounds that continuing ownership would bring the NFL into disrepute.

Following the end of his football career, Wheelwright appeared as an actor in films including The Longest Yard (1974), Trackdown (1976), The Greatest (1977) & Wildcats (1986).

Ernie Wheelwright died of cancer in Las Vegas on May 1, 2001, aged 61.

== Filmography ==
Year	Title	Role	Notes
1974	The Longest Yard	Spooner	
1976	Trackdown	Rosey	
1977	The Greatest	Bossman Jones	
