= Marion Rushing =

American football player (1936–2013)

Profile
- Position: Linebacker

Personal information
- Born: September 3, 1936; Pinckneyville, Illinois, U.S.
- Died: April 26, 2013 (aged 76); Pinckneyville, Illinois, U.S.

Career information
- College: Southern Illinois

Career history
- Chicago/St. Louis Cardinals (1959–1965); Atlanta Falcons (1966–1968); Houston Oilers (1968)
- Stats at Pro Football Reference

Marion Rushing (September 3, 1936 – April 26, 2013) was an American professional football player. Born in Pinckneyville, Illinois, he played 9 1/2 seasons in the National Football League (NFL), mainly for the Chicago/St. Louis Cardinals. He finished his pro football career in 1968 with the Houston Oilers of the American Football League (AFL). While at Southern Illinois University (SIU), Rushing earned more athletic letters than any other athlete in Saluki history. He earned a total of 13 letters while playing football, basketball, track, and wrestling for SIU. Following his career at SIU, Rushing went on to play professional football in both the NFL and AFL. He was inducted into the charter class of the Saluki Hall of Fame in 1978. In 2010 SIU honored Rushing by renaming a street near the new football stadium, Marion Rushing Lane.

== See also ==
- List of American Football League players
