= Mike Donohoe =

American football player (born 1945)

- Donohoe in 1972

No. 84, 86
- Position: Tight end

Personal information
- Born: May 6, 1945 (age 81); San Francisco, California, U.S.
- Listed height: 6 ft 3 in (1.91 m)
- Listed weight: 225 lb (102 kg)

Career information
- High school: Archbishop Riordan (San Francisco)
- College: San Francisco
- NFL draft: 1968: 9th round, 225th overall pick

Career history
- Atlanta Falcons (1968–1971); Green Bay Packers (1973–1974)

Career NFL statistics
- Receptions: 10
- Receiving yards: 106
- Touchdowns: 2
- Stats at Pro Football Reference

Michael Pierce Donohoe (born May 6, 1945) is an American former tight end in the National Football League (NFL).

== Biography ==
Donohoe was born in San Francisco, California, United States.

== Career ==
Donohoe was drafted in the ninth round of the 1968 NFL/AFL draft by the Minnesota Vikings. He would go on to play his first three seasons with the Atlanta Falcons. During his final two season he would play with the Green Bay Packers. Donohoe spent the 1975 season in the World Football League with the Hawaiians.

He played at the collegiate level at the University of San Francisco where he was inducted into the Hall of Fame in 1988.
