= Gary Barnes =

American football player (1939–2023)

No. 80, 86, 88
- Position: Wide receiver

Personal information
- Born: September 13, 1939; Fairfax, Alabama, U.S.
- Died: August 15, 2023 (aged 83); Clemson, South Carolina, U.S.
- Listed height: 6 ft 5 in (1.96 m)
- Listed weight: 210 lb (95 kg)

Career information
- High school: Valley (Valley, Alabama)
- College: Clemson
- NFL draft: 1962: 3rd round, 41st overall pick
- AFL draft: 1962: 9th round, 69th overall pick

Career history
- Green Bay Packers (1962); Dallas Cowboys (1963); Chicago Bears (1964); Huntsville Rockets (1965); Philadelphia Eagles (1965)*; Atlanta Falcons (1966–1967)
- * Offseason or practice squad member only

Awards and highlights
- NFL champion (1962); 2× First-team All-ACC (1959, 1960); Second-team All-ACC (1961)

Career NFL statistics
- Receptions: 41
- Receiving yards: 583
- Touchdowns: 2
- Stats at Pro Football Reference

Gary Marshall Barnes (September 13, 1939 – August 15, 2023) was an American professional football player who was a wide receiver in the National Football League (NFL) for the Green Bay Packers, the Dallas Cowboys, the Chicago Bears, and the Atlanta Falcons. He played college football for the Clemson Tigers.

== Early life ==
Gary Marshall Barnes attended Valley High School, where he practiced football and basketball. He spent a year at Gordon Military Academy, before accepting a scholarship from Clemson University with the intention of playing both sports.

Head coach Frank Howard convinced him to just focus on football and eventually named him a starter at split end as a sophomore, registering 9 receptions for 216 yards and 3 touchdowns. He had a 68-yard touchdown reception in a 23-7 win over the seventh-ranked Texas Christian University in the 1959 Bluebonnet Bowl.

The next year, he posted 14 receptions for 256 yards and one touchdown. He was moved to halfback as a senior, finishing with 16 receptions for 247 yards, 8 carries for 31 yards and 3 touchdowns.

In 2002, he was inducted into the Clemson University Athletic Hall of Fame. In 2005, he was inducted in the South Carolina Athletic Hall of Fame.

== Professional career ==
=== Green Bay Packers ===
Barnes was selected by the Green Bay Packers in the third round (41st overall) of the 1962 NFL draft and was also selected by the New York Titans in the ninth round (69th overall) of the 1962 AFL draft. As a rookie, he was a backup wide receiver, appearing in 13 games with no receptions and was a member of the 1962 NFL Championship team.

In 1963, he was traded to the Dallas Cowboys in exchange for a fifth round draft choice (#60-Duke Carlisle).

=== Dallas Cowboys ===
In 1963, he appeared in 12 games (3 starts), registering 15 receptions for 195 yards. On June 18, 1964, he was traded to the Chicago Bears in exchange for defensive end Maury Youmans.

=== Chicago Bears ===
In 1964, the Chicago Bears acquired Barnes for depth purposes and he only recorded four receptions for 61 yards. He was waived in August 1965.

=== Philadelphia Eagles ===
On August 23, 1965, he was signed as a free agent by the Philadelphia Eagles. He was released 7 days later on August 30.

=== Atlanta Falcons ===
In 1965, Barnes was the first player signed to a contract by the Atlanta Falcons in team history. He was asked to play for a semi-pro football team in Huntsville, to keep in shape since the franchise was still a year away from beginning play. The next season, he scored the first touchdown in Falcons history, with a 53-yard reception from quarterback Randy Johnson during a 14–19 loss in the season opener against the Los Angeles Rams. On November 25, 1966, he was released to make room for rookie Richard Koeper.

Barnes was re-signed in January 1967. He was released on September 4, 1968. Although he had an opportunity to try out for other teams, he opted to retire, finishing with 60 career games, 41 receptions for 583 yards and 2 touchdowns.

== Personal life and death ==
After football, he worked in the fiber division of Chevron Corporation. He also operated a textile business and was an investment adviser.

In 1986, although he had no previous legal experience, he was asked by then-Clemson City Council member Gaston Gage to become Clemson's first full-time municipal judge. He spent 30 years in that job until retiring in 2015.

Gary Barnes died from Parkinson's disease in Clemson, on August 15, 2023, at the age of 83.
