= Ed Cook (American football) =

American football player (1932–2007)

No. 75
- Positions: Guard, tackle

Personal information
- Born: June 29, 1932; Philadelphia, Pennsylvania, US
- Died: September 7, 2007 (aged 75)
- Listed height: 6 ft 2 in (1.88 m)
- Listed weight: 245 lb (111 kg)

Career information
- High school: Southeast Catholic (PA)
- College: Notre Dame
- NFL draft: 1958: undrafted

Career history
- Chicago/St. Louis Cardinals (1958–1965); Atlanta Falcons (1966–1967)

Career NFL statistics
- Games played: 112
- Games started: 68
- Fumble recoveries: 1
- Stats at Pro Football Reference

Edward Joseph Cook (June 29, 1932 – September 7, 2007) was a professional American football offensive lineman in the National Football League (NFL).

== Early life and education ==
Born in Philadelphia, Cook attended high school at Southeast Catholic High School where he was coached by Paul Bartolomeo. In his senior year, he was named to the All Scholastic Team. Cook later attended the University of Notre Dame.

== Football career ==
Cook made his professional debut in the NFL in 1958 with the Chicago Cardinals. He played for the Cardinals (1958–65), and the Atlanta Falcons (1966–67).

In 1965, the Sonny Randle injured his shoulder and was out for the remainder of the season, causing the St Louis Cardinals to move Billy Gambrell to Randle's position, Irv Goode to Gambrell's, and Cook to tackle in place of Goode.

== Personal life ==
Cook's son Ed Jr was also coached by Paul Bartolomeo at Southeast Catholic.
