= Norm Van Brocklin =

American football player, coach and executive (1926–1983)

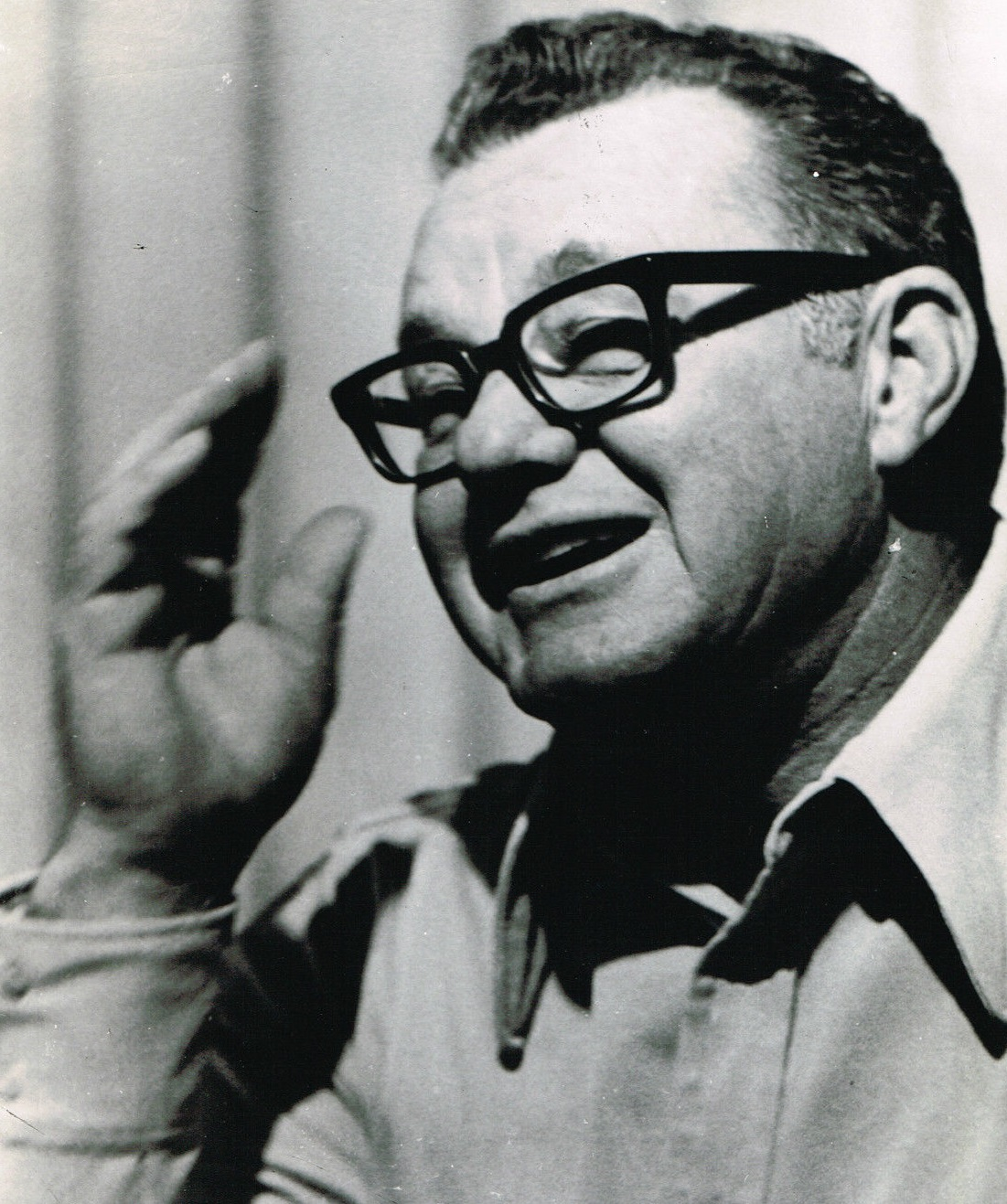
- Van Brocklin in 1974

No. 25, 11
- Positions: Quarterback, punter

Personal information
- Born: March 15, 1926; Parade, South Dakota, U.S.
- Died: May 2, 1983 (aged 57); Social Circle, Georgia, U.S.
- Listed height: 6 ft 1 in (1.85 m)
- Listed weight: 190 lb (86 kg)

Career information
- High school: Acalanes (Lafayette, California)
- College: Oregon (1946–1948)
- NFL draft: 1949: 4th round, 37th overall pick

Career history

Playing
- Los Angeles Rams (1949–1957); Philadelphia Eagles (1958–1960)

Coaching
- Minnesota Vikings (1961–1966) Head coach; Atlanta Falcons (1968–1974) Head coach; Georgia Tech (1979) Running backs coach

Operations
- Atlanta Falcons (1970–1974) General manager

Awards and highlights
- As a player: 2× NFL champion (1951, 1960); NFL Most Valuable Player (1960); 2× First-team All-Pro (1955, 1960); 2× Second-team All-Pro (1952, 1954); 9× Pro Bowl (1950–1955, 1958–1960); NFL passing yards leader (1954); NFL completion percentage leader (1952); NFL passer rating leader (1950); NFL 1950s All-Decade Team; Philadelphia Eagles Hall of Fame; St. Louis Football Ring of Fame; First-team All-American (1948); 2× First-team All-PCC (1947, 1948); NFL record: Most passing yards in a game: 554 (Note: Week 1, against the New York Yanks in 1951.)

Career NFL statistics
- Passing attempts: 2,895
- Passing completions: 1,553
- Completion percentage: 53.6%
- TD–INT: 173–178
- Passing yards: 23,611
- Passer rating: 75.1
- Punting yards: 22,313
- Punting average: 42.7
- Stats at Pro Football Reference

Head coaching record
- Career: 66–100–7 (.402)
- Coaching profile at Pro Football Reference
- Executive profile at Pro Football Reference
- Pro Football Hall of Fame
- College Football Hall of Fame

Norman Mack Van Brocklin (March 15, 1926 – May 2, 1983) was an American professional football quarterback and coach who played in the National Football League (NFL) for 12 seasons. Nicknamed "the Dutchman", he spent his first nine seasons with the Los Angeles Rams and his final three with the Philadelphia Eagles. Following his playing career, he was the inaugural head coach of the Minnesota Vikings from 1961 to 1966 and the second head coach of the Atlanta Falcons from 1968 to 1974.

Van Brocklin played college football for the Oregon Webfoots, earning All-America honors in 1948. Due to concerns over his professional availability, he was not selected until the fourth round of the 1949 NFL draft by the Rams. During his first three seasons, he and teammate Bob Waterfield alternated as the starting quarterback, culminating with them leading Los Angeles to victory in the 1951 championship game. After Waterfield retired, Van Brocklin served as the Rams primary starter from 1952 to 1957, concluding his tenure with six consecutive Pro Bowl selections and a passing-yards leading season in 1954. He joined Philadelphia in 1958, extending his Pro Bowl selections to nine. In his final season, he was named NFL Most Valuable Player en route to winning the 1960 championship.

As the head coach of the expansion Vikings and Falcons, Van Brocklin was unable to reach the postseason with either franchise, but recorded the first winning season for both. He was inducted to the Pro Football Hall of Fame in 1971 and the College Football Hall of Fame in 1966.

== Early life ==
Born in Parade, South Dakota, Van Brocklin was one of nine children of Mack and Ethel Van Brocklin. His father was a watchmaker. The family moved to Northern California and settled in Walnut Creek, east of Oakland. Van Brocklin was a three-sport standout at Acalanes High School in Lafayette, where he quarterbacked the football team to a 5–3 record as a sophomore and a 4–2–2 record as a junior. He served in the U.S. Navy from 1943 through 1945, foregoing his senior year of high school.

== College career ==
Following World War II, Van Brocklin followed two former high school teammates north and enrolled at the University of Oregon in Eugene. He became the starting quarterback in 1947 under first-year head coach Jim Aiken, and led the Ducks to a 16–5 record in his two seasons as a starter. In 1948, Oregon tied with California for the title of the Pacific Coast Conference, forerunner of the Pac-12. California was undefeated overall, and Oregon's only loss was at undefeated Michigan, that year's national champions, and the Ducks had seven victories in the PCC to Cal's six. Oregon did not go to the Rose Bowl, however, because Cal was voted by the other schools to represent the PCC in the game. Oregon needed only a 5–5 tie vote, as Cal had been to the game more recently, and with six Northwest schools and four in California, appeared favored to advance. Oregon had opted for a playoff game, but California declined. Among the Cal voters was the University of Washington, which elevated the intensity of the Oregon-Washington rivalry. Breaking with tradition, the PCC allowed Oregon to accept an invitation to play SMU in the Cotton Bowl in Dallas. It was the first time that a Pacific Coast team played in a major bowl game other than the Rose Bowl (a policy which was continued by the Pac-8 through 1974). Both Oregon and California lost their New Year's Day bowl games. That season, Van Brocklin was honored with an All-America selection and finished sixth in the Heisman Trophy voting. Coincidentally, the Heisman Trophy winner that year was SMU running back Doak Walker. Both Walker and Van Brocklin got Outstanding Player recognition for their performance in the Cotton Bowl Classic.

Van Brocklin left Oregon for the NFL with one remaining year of college eligibility. At that time, a player was not allowed to join the NFL until four years after graduating from high school. Though he had only been at the University of Oregon for three years, he was eligible due to his time in the Navy during World War II. At age 23, he completed his bachelor's degree in June 1949.

== Professional playing career ==
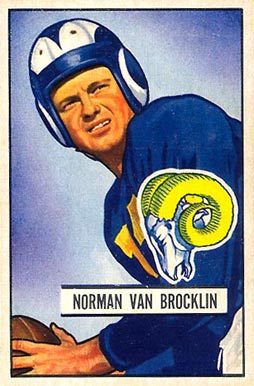
Van Brocklin depicted in 1951

=== Los Angeles Rams ===
Van Brocklin was selected 37th overall in the 1949 NFL draft, taken in the fourth round by the Los Angeles Rams. Teams were not sure if he planned to play the 1949 season in college, so he fell in the draft, conducted in December 1948. Van Brocklin signed with the Rams in July and joined a team that already had a star quarterback, Bob Waterfield. Beginning in 1950, new Rams coach Joe Stydahar solved his problem by platooning Waterfield and Van Brocklin. The 1950 Rams scored a then-record 466 points (38.8 per game – which is still a record) with a high octane passing attack featuring Tom Fears and Elroy "Crazy Legs" Hirsch. Fears led the league and set a new NFL record with 84 receptions. Van Brocklin and Waterfield finished 1–2 in passer rating as well. They were defeated by the Cleveland Browns in the 1950 title game, 30–28.

In 1951, Van Brocklin and Waterfield again split quarterbacking duties and the Rams again won the West. That year, Hirsch set an NFL record with 1,495 receiving yards and tied Don Hutson's record of 17 touchdown receptions. This time, the Rams won the title rematch against Cleveland, 24–17. Waterfield (9–24, 125 yards) took most of the snaps at the L.A. Coliseum, but Van Brocklin (4–6, 128 yards) threw a game-winning 73-yard touchdown pass to Fears. It was the Rams' only NFL championship while originally based in southern California; their next came in 1999, several years after the move east to St. Louis. After returning to Los Angeles for the 2016 season, the Rams subsequently won Super Bowl LVI in 2022.

Earlier in 1951 on opening night, Van Brocklin threw for an NFL record 554 yards on September 28, breaking Johnny Lujack's single-game record of 468 set two years earlier. Waterfield was injured so Van Brocklin played the entire game and completed 27 of 41 attempts with five touchdowns. Despite the increase in passing attacks by NFL teams in recent years, the yardage record still stands, set 75 years ago.

Waterfield retired after the 1952 season and Van Brocklin continued to quarterback the Rams, leading them to the title game again in 1955, hosted at the L.A. Coliseum. In that game, the visiting Browns crushed the Rams 38–14 as Van Brocklin threw six interceptions. In early January 1958, he announced his retirement from pro football after nine seasons and had plans to enter private business in Oregon at Portland.

=== Philadelphia Eagles ===
Less than five months later in late May, Van Brocklin changed his mind and was traded to the Philadelphia Eagles for two players (offensive lineman Buck Lansford and defensive end Jimmy Harris) and a first-round draft pick. It was disclosed he did not want to play another season for the Rams under head coach Sid Gillman's offense, but it was not a personality issue with Gillman. Under famed head coach Buck Shaw, Van Brocklin was given total control of the offense in Philadelphia in 1958, and he steadily improved the Eagles' attack. In his third and final season with Philly in 1960, the team had the best regular season record in league at 10–2, and hosted the Green Bay Packers in the NFL Championship Game at Franklin Field. Throwing to his favorite receiver, 5 ft 9 in (1.75 m) 176 lb (80 kg) Tommy McDonald, Van Brocklin led the Eagles to victory. In a game dominated by defense, he led a fourth quarter comeback, resulting in a final score of 17–13.

During his twelve-year career, Van Brocklin played on two NFL championship teams: the 1951 Los Angeles Rams and the 1960 Philadelphia Eagles. Following the latter triumph, he retired. As it turned out, the Eagles were the only team to defeat the Packers in a playoff game during Vince Lombardi's tenure as Green Bay's head coach. Van Brocklin led the NFL in passing three times and in punting twice; he retired as the all-time punts leader at 523 and was the first person with 500 career punts. On nine occasions, he was selected to the Pro Bowl. He was a first team All-Pro for the 1960 season.

== Coaching career ==
=== Minnesota Vikings ===
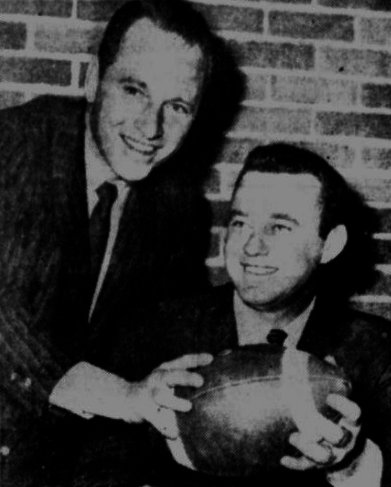
Norm Van Brocklin (right) with Vikings general manager Bert Rose (left) in 1961

Van Brocklin cut his ties with the Eagles after his belief that the team had reneged on an agreement to name him head coach to replace the retiring Buck Shaw, as they instead wanted him to serve as a player-coach when he really wanted to go out on top as a player. On January 18, 1961, he accepted the head coaching position for the expansion Minnesota Vikings, less than a month after winning the NFL Championship game. Van Brocklin personally looked at film for over two dozen quarterbacks before picking Fran Tarkenton in the third round of the draft. In training camp, he emphasized for Tarkenton to "hum the ball", complete with making him do weight exercises and practicing throws on a line. He also allowed Tarkenton to call his own plays. Van Brocklin tapped George Shaw as the starting quarterback for the first game of the season, but he prepared Tarkenton the week before the first game by having him come over to his house to study film night after night. When the Vikings played the Chicago Bears on September 17, Van Brocklin tapped Tarkenton to replace Shaw after the first quarter. Tarkenton proceeded to throw 17-of-23 for 250 yards with four touchdowns in the 37–13 victory.

Dubbed "Stormin' Norman" for his fiery temper towards players and even officials (which once saw him throw a pocketful of change at an official), Van Brocklin compiled a record of 29–51–4 (.369) in six seasons. The tenure was highlighted by his contentious relationship with quarterback Fran Tarkenton. Van Brocklin was displeased with Tarkenton's penchant for scrambling, preferring that he stay in the pocket. The feud culminated with Tarkenton's demand for a trade and Van Brocklin's surprise resignation on February 11, 1967. Van Brocklin stated the following about Tarkenton a month later about Tarkenton: “There are two types of quarterbacks—those who carry a team and those who have to be carried by the team. Francis will win some games he shouldn’t win, but he’ll lose some games he shouldn’t lose.” In an interview years later, Tarkenton described Van Brocklin as both "a great quarterback and a brilliant offensive mind" and also "a dysfunctional human being, totally dysfunctional." While the Vikings attempted to dissuade Tarkenton from being traded with the departure of Van Brocklin, Tarkenton stayed firm with his desire for a trade in the belief of not wanting to be thought of as having Van Brocklin's departure tied to him. Tarkenton was traded to the New York Giants shortly after Van Brocklin's departure. He was reacquired by Van Brocklin's successor, Bud Grant, five years later in 1972. One thing Van Brocklin was known for was his disdain for soccer-style kickers (now the standard in the NFL). In one game, soccer-style kicker Garo Yepremian beat Van Brocklin's team and after the game, a reporter asked how he felt about losing the game on a last-second field goal, and he replied, "They ought to change the god-damned immigration laws in this country". However, Van Brocklin did end up having a soccer-style kicker in Nick Mike-Mayer in his final two seasons as coach of the Falcons, in 1973 and 1974.

During his first year off the field in over two decades, Van Brocklin served as a commentator on NFL broadcasts in 1967 for CBS.

=== Atlanta Falcons ===
In 1968, Van Brocklin took over as head coach of the Atlanta Falcons on October 1, replacing Norb Hecker, who had started the season with three defeats, extending the team losing streak to ten games. Over the next seven seasons, Van Brocklin had mixed results, putting together a 37–49–3 mark. He led the team to its first winning season in 1971 with a 7–6–1 record, then challenged for a playoff spot in 1973 with a 9–5 mark. His 1973 Falcons handed the Fran Tarkenton-led, 9–0 Minnesota Vikings its first defeat, on Monday Night Football. However, after winning just two of his first eight games in 1974, he was fired.

== Career statistics ==
=== Playing career ===
Legend
	AP NFL MVP
	NFL champion
	Led the league
**Bold**	Career high

Year	Team	Games			Passing									Punting				
Year	Team	GP	GS	Record	Cmp	Att	Pct	Yds	Avg	TD	Int	Lng	Rtg	Punts	Yds	Avg	Lng	Blk
1949	LA	8	0	—	32	58	55.2	601	10.4	6	2	51	111.4	2	91	45.5	46	0
1950	LA	**12**	6	5–1	127	233	54.5	2,061	8.8	18	14	58	85.1	11	466	42.4	51	0
1951	LA	**12**	2	1–1	100	194	51.5	1,725	8.9	13	11	81	80.8	48	1,992	41.5	62	**1**
1952	LA	**12**	6	6–0	113	205	55.1	1,736	8.5	14	17	84	71.5	29	1,250	43.1	66	0
1953	LA	**12**	**12**	8–3–1	156	286	54.5	2,393	8.4	19	14	70	84.1	**60**	2,529	42.2	57	0
1954	LA	**12**	11	6–4–1	139	260	53.5	**2,637**	**10.1**	13	**21**	80	71.9	44	1,874	42.6	61	0
1955	LA	**12**	**12**	8–3–1	144	272	52.9	1,890	6.9	8	15	74	62.0	**60**	**2,676**	**44.6**	61	0
1956	LA	**12**	4	2–2	68	124	54.8	966	7.8	7	12	58	59.5	48	2,070	43.1	**72**	0
1957	LA	**12**	**12**	6–6	132	265	49.8	2,105	7.9	20	**21**	70	68.8	54	2,392	44.3	71	0
1958	PHI	**12**	**12**	2–9–1	**198**	**374**	52.9	2,409	6.4	15	20	**91**	64.1	54	2,225	41.2	58	**1**
1959	PHI	**12**	**12**	7–5	191	340	**56.2**	2,617	7.7	16	14	71	79.5	53	2,263	42.7	59	**1**
1960	PHI	**12**	**12**	**10–2**	153	284	53.9	2,471	8.7	**24**	17	64	**86.5**	**60**	2,585	43.1	70	0
Career		140	101	61–36–4	1,553	2,895	53.6	23,611	8.2	173	178	91	75.1	523	22,413	42.9	72	3

=== Head coaching record ===
Team	Year	Regular season					Postseason			
Team	Year	Won	Lost	Ties	Win %	Finish	Won	Lost	Win %	Result
MIN	1961	3	11	0	.214	7th in NFL Western	—	—	—	—
MIN	1962	2	11	1	.179	6th in NFL Western	—	—	—	—
MIN	1963	5	8	1	.393	4th in NFL Western	—	—	—	—
MIN	1964	8	5	1	.607	2nd in NFL Western	—	—	—	—
MIN	1965	7	7	0	.500	5th in NFL Western	—	—	—	—
MIN	1966	4	9	1	.321	6th in NFL Western	—	—	—	—
MIN Total		29	51	4	.369		—	—	—	
ATL	1968	2	9	0	.182	4th in NFL Coastal	—	—	—	—
ATL	1969	6	8	0	.429	3rd in NFL Coastal	—	—	—	—
ATL	1970	4	8	2	.357	3rd in NFC West	—	—	—	—
ATL	1971	7	6	1	.536	3rd in NFC West	—	—	—	—
ATL	1972	7	7	0	.500	2nd in NFC West	—	—	—	—
ATL	1973	9	5	0	.643	2nd in NFC West	—	—	—	—
ATL	1974	2	6	0	.250	4th in NFC West	—	—	—	—
ATL Total		37	49	3	.433		—	—	—	
Total		66	100	7	.402		—	—	—	

== Career highlights ==
=== Awards and honors ===
NFL

- 2× NFL champion (1951, 1960)
- NFL Most Valuable Player (1960)
- 2× First-team All-Pro (1955, 1960)
- 2× Second-team All-Pro (1952, 1954)
- 9× Pro Bowl (1950–1955, 1958–1960)
- NFL passing yards leader (1954)
- NFL completion percentage leader (1952)
- NFL passer rating leader (1950)
- No. 83 on The Top 100: NFL's Greatest Players
- NFL 1950s All-Decade Team
- Philadelphia Eagles Hall of Fame
- St. Louis Football Ring of Fame

College

- First-team All-American (1948)
- 2× First-team All-PCC (1947, 1948)

=== Records ===
- First player in NFL history to throw for over 500 yards: 554 on September 28, 1951
- Most passing yards in a single game: 554 on September 28, 1951

== Final years ==
Following his dismissal, Van Brocklin returned to his pecan farm in Social Circle, Georgia, east of Atlanta. His only connections to football during this era were as a running backs coach for Georgia Tech under head coach Pepper Rodgers in 1979, who was fired that December. It was his only stint as an assistant coach. Rodgers's successor Bill Curry brought in a new staff in 1980 and Van Brocklin then was a college football analyst on "Superstation" WTBS in Atlanta.

== Personal life and death ==
Van Brocklin and his wife Gloria married in 1947 and had three children together. Shortly before the family's departure from Minnesota in 1966, they adopted three children.

Van Brocklin, a heavy cigarette smoker, suffered a number of illnesses, including a brain tumor. After it was removed, he told the press, "It was a brain transplant. They gave me a sportswriter's brain, to make sure I got one that hadn't been used." He died of a heart attack in 1983 at age 57, five weeks after former teammate Bob Waterfield.

Van Brocklin was posthumously elected to the University of Oregon Athletics Hall of Fame in 1992.

== See also ==
- List of 500-yard passing games in the National Football League
