= Carlton Dabney =

American football player (born 1947)

No. 79
- Position: Defensive tackle

Personal information
- Born: January 26, 1947 (age 79); Richmond, Virginia, U.S.
- Listed height: 6 ft 3 in (1.91 m)
- Listed weight: 259 lb (117 kg)

Career information
- High school: Armstrong (Richmond)
- College: Morgan State (1964-1967)
- NFL draft: 1968: 2nd round, 29th overall pick

Career history
- Atlanta Falcons (1968)

Career NFL statistics
- Interceptions: 1
- Sacks: 3
- Stats at Pro Football Reference

Carlton Dabney (born January 26, 1947) is an American former professional football player who was a defensive tackle for the Atlanta Falcons of the National Football League (NFL). He played college football for the Morgan State Bears.
