= Wade Traynham =

American football player (born 1942)

No. 7
- Position: Kicker

Personal information
- Born: February 3, 1942 (age 84); Hampton, Virginia, U.S.
- Listed height: 6 ft 2 in (1.88 m)
- Listed weight: 218 lb (99 kg)

Career information
- High school: Hampton
- College: Frederick
- NFL draft: 1966: undrafted

Career history
- Atlanta Falcons (1966–1967)
- Stats at Pro Football Reference

Wade Lanier Traynham (born February 3, 1942) is an American former professional football player who was a kicker for the Atlanta Falcons of the National Football League (NFL). He played college football at Frederick College, but was "dismissed from the student body at Frederick College for disciplinary reasons."

== NFL career ==
Wade Traynham was a kicker for the Atlanta Falcons in 1966 and 1967 after previously having kicked for the semi-pro Savannah Chiefs. He appeared in only 2 games in 1966, but was the Falcons' regular kicker in 1967. Although he was 0 for 1 on field goal attempts in 1966, and only 7 for 18 in 1967, he made all 24 extra point attempts in his career (22 of them in 1967). The Falcons traded Traynham to the Green Bay Packers on July 30, 1968 in exchange for offensive lineman Steve Duich, who the Packers had taken in the 5th round of the 1968 draft. But after going 1 for 4 on field goal attempts in three preseason games, the Packers cut Traynham on August 26, 1968.

== The whiff that wasn't ==
Legend has it that Traynham was kicking off in the Falcons' very first pre-season game, and completely whiffed on the kick—a harbinger of tough days ahead for the Falcons. Traynham debunked the story in a 1999 interview. Traynham said the play in question was not in the Falcons' preseason debut, but in their second regular season game, against the Philadelphia Eagles. He said, "I never whiffed the ball, I just slipped planting my foot...But I got a little piece of the ball as I went down. It wound up being a perfect onside kick and we got it back." However, Traynham strained a thigh muscle on the play and did not kick the rest of the season.

== Post-NFL life ==
Traynham coached football from 1981-1984 for Phoebus High School in his home town of Hampton, Virginia. He was later softball coach at the school.
