= Mike Freeman (defensive back) =

American football player (born 1944)

No. 43, 28
- Position: Defensive back

Personal information
- Born: July 13, 1944 (age 82); Los Angeles, California, U.S.
- Listed height: 5 ft 11 in (1.80 m)
- Listed weight: 179 lb (81 kg)

Career information
- High school: Fresno (Fresno, California)
- College: Fresno State
- NFL draft: 1968: 4th round, 89th overall pick

Career history
- Atlanta Falcons (1968–1970); Houston Texans (1974)

Career NFL statistics
- Interceptions: 1
- Fumble recoveries: 5
- Stats at Pro Football Reference

Michael Freeman (born July 13, 1944) is an American former professional football player who was a defensive back in the National Football League (NFL). He played college football for the Fresno State Bulldogs.

Freeman was born in Los Angeles in 1944 and attended McLane High School in Fresno, California. He played college football at Fresno City College for two years before transferring to California State University, Fresno. He starred at Fresno State as a defensive back/safety in 1966 and 1967 and was selected by the UPI as a first-team defensive back on the 1966 Little All-America team.

Freeman was selected by the Minnesota Vikings in the fourth round (89th overall pick) of the 1968 NFL/AFL draft. He was placed on waivers by the Vikings in early September 1968 and immediately claimed by the Atlanta Falcons. During his time with the Falcons, he was used primarily as a backup and on special teams. He appeared in 37 games for the Atlanta Falcons, six of them as a starter, from 1968 to 1970. He totaled one interception and five fumble recoveries.
