= Frank E. Wall =

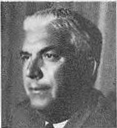
- Wall, c. 1968

Personal information
- Died: April 16, 1997 (aged 78); Sandy Springs, Georgia, U.S.

Career history
- Atlanta Falcons (1966) Vice president and treasurer; Atlanta Falcons (1967–1969) General manager; Atlanta Falcons (1970–1976) President

Frank E. Wall (died April 16, 1997) was an American accountant and sports executive who served as president and general manager of the Atlanta Falcons of the National Football League (NFL).

Wall was a partner of the accounting firm of Garrett and Wall and served as a financial assistant to Atlanta Falcons owner Rankin M. Smith Sr. On July 1, 1966, Wall was named the team's treasurer. On January 31, 1967, he became the team's general manager. On January 11, 1970, he was promoted to team president and head coach Norm Van Brocklin took on the additional duties of general manager. In 1977 he was replaced as president by Rankin M. Smith Jr. but remained with the team as a director until his death from a self-inflicted gunshot on April 16, 1997.
