= Bill Sandeman =

American football player (born 1942)

No. 70, 73, 61
- Positions: Offensive tackle, Defensive tackle

Personal information
- Born: November 30, 1942 (age 83); Providence, Rhode Island, U.S.
- Listed height: 6 ft 6 in (1.98 m)
- Listed weight: 252 lb (114 kg)

Career information
- High school: Lincoln (Stockton, California)
- College: Delta College (1961–1962); Pacific (1963–1964)
- NFL draft: 1965: undrafted

Career history
- Dallas Cowboys (1965–1966); New Orleans Saints (1967); Atlanta Falcons (1967–1974)

Career NFL statistics
- Games played: 84
- Games started: 61
- Fumble recoveries: 3
- Stats at Pro Football Reference

William Stewart Sandeman (born November 30, 1942, in Providence, Rhode Island) was an American professional football offensive tackle in the NFL for the Dallas Cowboys, New Orleans Saints, and Atlanta Falcons. He played college football at the University of the Pacific.

== Early life ==
Sandeman was a notable swimmer at Lincoln High School and started to play football as a junior.

He enrolled at Stockton Junior College where he was an All-American as a swimmer. After his sophomore season, he accepted a football scholarship from the University of the Pacific, where he played tight end and defensive end. He also competed in swimming.

In 2009, he was inducted into the Pacific Athletics Hall of Fame.

== Professional career ==
=== Dallas Cowboys ===
Sandeman was not selected in the 1965 NFL draft and was signed as an undrafted free agent by the Dallas Cowboys. He injured his knee early in training camp and was placed on the injured reserve list.

In 1966, he was being converted to the offensive line, so he played both on offense and defense. He played in eight games before being placed on the injured reserve list.

=== New Orleans Saints ===
He was selected by the New Orleans Saints in the 1967 NFL expansion draft. He was a part of the inaugural team and was released after playing in two games.

=== Atlanta Falcons ===
In 1967, he was claimed off waivers by the Atlanta Falcons. In 1968, he became the regular starter at left tackle, before suffering a crushed disk on his back. In 1971, he regained his starter position and appeared in all 14 games.

In 1973, he started 12 games but was limited with knee problems. In 1974, he was placed on the injured reserve list after having back surgery to correct a slipped disk. On July 17, 1975, he announced his retirement.
