= Norb Hecker =

American football player (1927–2004)

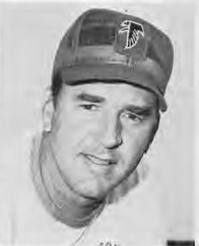
- Hecker in 1968

No. 88, 79, 48, 70
- Position: Safety

Personal information
- Born: May 26, 1927; Berea, Ohio, U.S.
- Died: March 14, 2004 (aged 76); Los Altos, California, U.S.
- Listed height: 6 ft 2 in (1.88 m)
- Listed weight: 193 lb (88 kg)

Career information
- High school: Olmsted Falls (Olmsted Falls, Ohio)
- College: Baldwin–Wallace
- NFL draft: 1951: 6th round, 72nd overall pick

Career history

Playing
- Los Angeles Rams (1951–1953); Toronto Argonauts (1954); Washington Redskins (1955–1957); Hamilton Tiger-Cats (1958)

Coaching
- Green Bay Packers (1959–1965) Defensive backs coach; Atlanta Falcons (1966–1968) Head coach; New York Giants (1969–1971) Defensive coordinator; Stanford (1972–1973) Defensive coordinator & defensive line coach; Stanford (1974–1976) Defensive coordinator & linebackers coach; Stanford (1977–1978) Linebackers coach; San Francisco 49ers (1979) Defensive backs coach; San Francisco 49ers (1980–1986) Linebackers coach

Awards and highlights
- As a player: NFL champion (1951); First-team Little All-American (1950); As an assistant coach: 3× NFL champion (1961, 1962, 1965); Super Bowl champion (XVI) champion (XIX)

Career NFL statistics
- Interceptions: 28
- Fumble recoveries: 4
- Total touchdowns: 3
- Stats at Pro Football Reference

Head coaching record
- Career: 4–26–1 (.145)
- Coaching profile at Pro Football Reference

Norbert Earl Hecker (May 26, 1927 – March 14, 2004) was an American professional football player and coach who was part of eight National Football League (NFL) championship teams and was the first head coach of the NFL's Atlanta Falcons.

== Early life and career ==
Born and raised in Olmsted Falls, Ohio, Hecker served in the U.S. Army during World War II, then returned home to attend nearby Baldwin-Wallace College. In his years at the school, he showed himself to be an outstanding athlete by competing in four sports, most notably in football, where he won small college All-American honors in 1950 at wide receiver. He also excelled at baseball, basketball, and track. After having seen time as a reserve during the previous two years, Hecker caught 34 passes for 646 yards as a senior, including 13 catches in a single game.

== Professional career ==
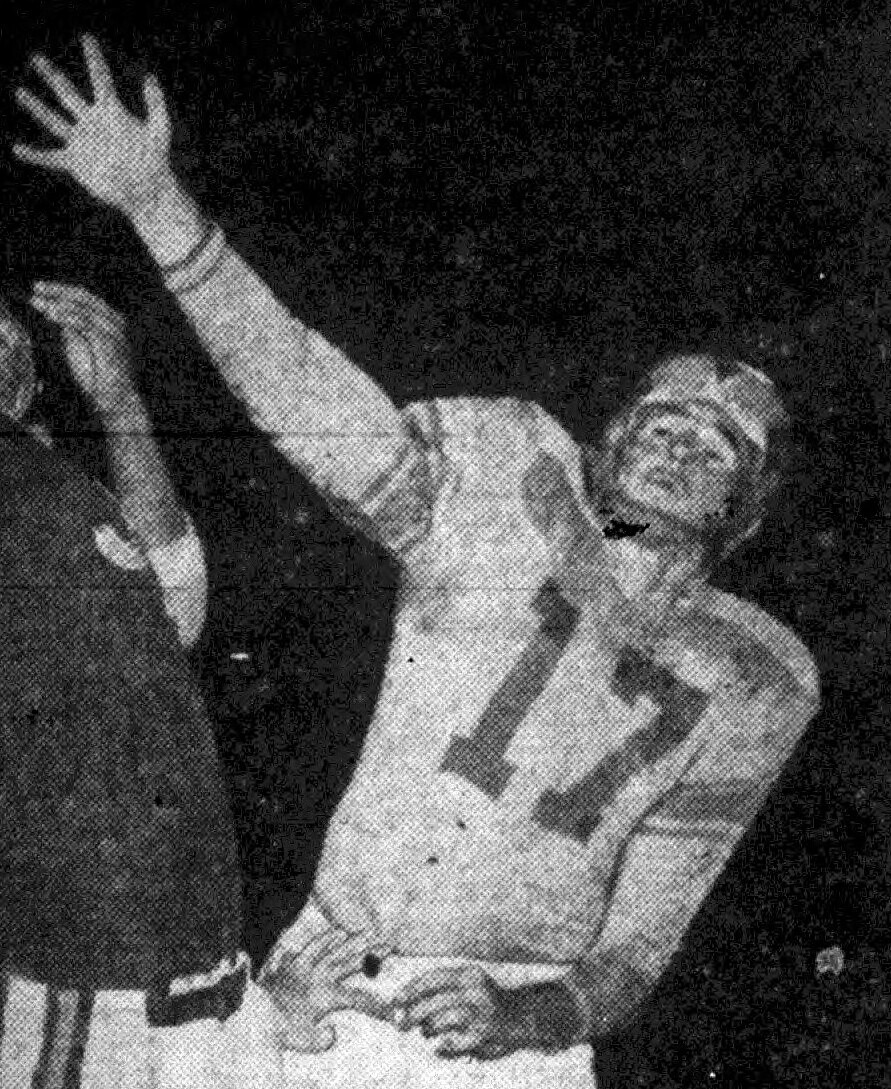
Hecker on August 31, 1951 playing against the Chicago Bears.

Hecker was drafted by the Los Angeles Rams in the sixth round of the 1951 NFL draft, and during his first season with the team, played on both sides of the ball, missing only one game after suffering a fractured cheekbone. On defense, he returned one turnover for a touchdown that season, but his most important contribution came in the NFL title game on December 23, when his game-saving tackle helped the Rams defeat the Cleveland Browns, 24–17.

During the following off-season, Hecker married Barbara Anne Ritchie on April 4, a union that would last 46 years until her death. The family ties became even stronger when his brother Bob joined him in the Los Angeles secondary, but Hecker's time with the Rams would end after the conclusion of the 1953 NFL season, when, after intercepting seven passes for the year, he was dealt to the Washington Redskins. However, before playing a down with his new team, he signed to play with the Canadian Football League's Toronto Argonauts on June 8, 1954.

After just one season with his new team, the Argonauts released Hecker and the team's other American imports on December 14. After first choosing to stay up north with the Ottawa Rough Riders, Hecker changed his mind and reported to the Redskins' training camp on August 2, 1955. In his first season, he had a team-high six interceptions, returning one for a touchdown.

Off the field, Hecker also made an impact as one of 12 players who started the National Football League Players Association in 1956, briefly serving as the team representative.

Hecker closed out his career after two more years of action, scoring another defensive touchdown in 1957 and finishing with 28 interceptions for his career. He also had two touchdown receptions, while also seeing periodic duty as the team's placekicker.

Continuing knee troubles played a major role in Hecker's release from the Redskins on September 7, 1958, with the veteran returning to Canada for one final season as a player-coach with the Hamilton Tiger-Cats.

== Coaching career ==
On February 23, 1959, Hecker began his coaching career by signing as an assistant under new Green Bay Packers' coach Vince Lombardi. He relayed how he was hired in a 2002 interview:

"Jack Vainisi called me and said Lombardi wanted to talk to me about coming to Green Bay. I didn't know Vince from Adam. I went to Green Bay and talked to Lombardi, but spent more time with (Phil) Bengtson. Lombardi told me he was going to Jack Mara's funeral (in New York) and that he would call me the next week. Lombardi called me the next day and told me I was hired. I heard later that Buddy Parker (former NFL head coach) had recommended me."

Inheriting a team that had won just once in 1958, Lombardi finished with a winning record in his first season, then narrowly missed capturing the NFL title the following year. In each of the next two campaigns, the Packers won the championship, then added another in 1965. The latter title resulted in Hecker being hired by the expansion Falcons as their first head coach on January 26, 1966. He was hired on a four-year contract for $100,000.

Lombardi was initially pursued as the first Atlanta coach, but after deciding to stay with Green Bay, was asked for recommendations for Atlanta's first coach. At the time, Lombardi did not recommend Hecker and the Atlanta owner, Rankin Smith Sr., thinking Lombardi was trying to pull one over on him, decided to hire Hecker; NFL commissioner Pete Rozelle also recommended Hecker. The next three years would be an exercise in frustration for Hecker who managed just four wins in his 31 games at the helm. One bad omen of this misery came in the team's first exhibition game when the Falcons' kicker Wade Traynham completely missed the ball on the kickoff. Following the inaugural 3–11 season, the Falcons were plagued by injuries in 1967 and declined to a 1–12–1 mark, the lone win coming in a one-point mid-season contest against the Minnesota Vikings.

When Atlanta began the 1968 NFL season by dropping their first three games, Hecker was fired on October 1 and replaced by former Viking head coach Norm Van Brocklin. After reaching a settlement on the remaining two years of his contract, Hecker accepted the defensive coordinator position with the New York Giants on February 12, 1969. He had also been under consideration for a post with the Redskins, who had just hired the previously retired Lombardi.

Following a 6–8 season that began with the preseason dismissal of head coach Allie Sherman, the Giants came close to reaching the postseason in 1970 with a 9–5 mark. However, when the team slipped to 4–10 the next year and gave up 362 points, Hecker was fired on December 23, 1971. He resurfaced at Stanford University, first under Jack Christiansen from 1972 to 1976, then Bill Walsh the next two seasons.

When Walsh was hired as head coach of the San Francisco 49ers in 1979, Hecker came along as an assistant coach. After struggling for two seasons, the 49ers stunned the NFL by winning the championship in 1981, capping their turnaround season with a 26–21 win over the Cincinnati Bengals in Super Bowl XVI. San Francisco would go on to win three more Super Bowls, with Hecker eventually moving into a front office position until his retirement in 1991.

Hecker closed out his career in 1995 with the Amsterdam Admirals of the World League of American Football, handling both coaching and front office duties.

== Personal life ==
Hecker had five children with his wife. He died of cancer in 2004.
