= Errol Linden =

American football player (1937–1983)

No. 70, 73
- Position: Offensive tackle

Personal information
- Born: October 21, 1937; New Orleans, Louisiana, U.S.
- Died: March 10, 1983 (aged 45); New Orleans, Louisiana, U.S.
- Listed height: 6 ft 5 in (1.96 m)
- Listed weight: 258 lb (117 kg)

Career information
- High school: De La Salle (LA)
- College: Houston
- NFL draft: 1961: 10th round, 135th overall pick
- AFL draft: 1961: 29th round, 232nd overall pick

Career history
- Cleveland Browns (1961); Minnesota Vikings (1962–1965); Atlanta Falcons (1966–1968); New Orleans Saints (1969–1970)

Career NFL statistics
- Games played: 134
- Games started: 113
- Fumble recoveries: 4
- Stats at Pro Football Reference

Errol Joseph Linden (October 21, 1937 – March 10, 1983) was a National Football League (NFL) offensive tackle. Linden was selected in the tenth round by the Detroit Lions out of the University of Houston in the 1961 NFL draft and played ten seasons.

Over these 10 seasons, Linden, a native of New Orleans, played as an offensive lineman for the Cleveland Browns, the Minnesota Vikings, the Atlanta Falcons and the New Orleans Saints.

He died of cancer in a hospital at the age of 45.
