= Nick Rassas =

American football player (1944–2025)

No. 47, 27
- Position: Safety

Personal information
- Born: January 13, 1944; Baltimore, Maryland, U.S.
- Died: September 1, 2025 (aged 81); Salt Lake City, Utah, U.S.
- Listed height: 6 ft 0 in (1.83 m)
- Listed weight: 190 lb (86 kg)

Career information
- High school: Loyola Academy (Wilmette, Illinois)
- College: Notre Dame (1961-1965)
- NFL draft: 1966: 2nd round, 17th overall pick
- AFL draft: 1966: 2nd round, 16th overall pick

Career history
- Atlanta Falcons (1966–1968); New Orleans Saints (1970)*
- * Offseason or practice squad member only

Awards and highlights
- National champion (1964); Consensus All-American (1965)

Career NFL statistics
- Interceptions: 1
- Fumble recoveries: 2
- Stats at Pro Football Reference

Nicholas Charles Rassas (January 13, 1944 – September 1, 2025) was an American professional football player for the Atlanta Falcons of the National Football League (NFL) from 1966 to 1968. He played college football for the Notre Dame Fighting Irish under coaches Hugh Devore and Ara Parseghian.

Rassas was portrayed as an underdog in the 2009 Jim Dent book Resurrection: The Miracle Season That Saved Notre Dame, which was based on the 1964 Fighting Irish team.

Rassas died on September 1, 2025, in Salt Lake City, Utah, at the age of 81.

== See also ==
- List of NCAA major college yearly punt and kickoff return leaders
