= Joe Szczecko =

German gridiron football player (born 1942)

No. 71, 76
- Position: Defensive tackle

Personal information
- Born: August 25, 1942 (age 84); Lahr, Baden-Wurttemberg, Germany
- Listed height: 6 ft 0 in (1.83 m)
- Listed weight: 245 lb (111 kg)

Career information
- High school: Gordon Tech
- College: Northwestern
- NFL draft: 1965: undrafted

Career history
- Chicago Bears (1965)*; Atlanta Falcons (1966–1968); New York Giants (1969)
- * Offseason or practice squad member only
- Stats at Pro Football Reference

Joe Szczecko is a former professional American football player who played defensive tackle for four seasons for the Atlanta Falcons and New York Giants.
