= Bruce Lemmerman =

American gridiron football player and coach (born 1945)

No. 18, 10, 7
- Position: Quarterback

Personal information
- Born: October 4, 1945 (age 81); Los Angeles, California, U.S.
- Listed height: 6 ft 1 in (1.85 m)
- Listed weight: 206 lb (93 kg)

Career information
- High school: Westchester (Los Angeles)
- College: Cal State-Northridge (1964-1967)
- NFL draft: 1968: undrafted

Career history

Playing
- Atlanta Falcons (1968–1970); Edmonton Eskimos (1971–1979); Hamilton Tiger-Cats (1980)

Coaching
- Edmonton Eskimos (1981–1982) Offensive backfield coach; Los Angeles Express (1983) Offensive coordinator/quarterbacks coach; Houston Oilers (1984–1985) Receivers coach; Winnipeg Blue Bombers (1987–1988) Quarterbacks/running backs/receivers coach

Awards and highlights
- 6× Grey Cup champion (1975, 1978, 1979, 1981, 1982, 1988)

Career NFL statistics
- Passing attempts: 77
- Passing completions: 28
- Completion percentage: 36.4%
- TD–INT: 1–5
- Passing yards: 370
- Passer rating: 29.7
- Stats at Pro Football Reference

Bruce Lemmerman (born October 4, 1945) is an American former professional football player.

== Football career ==
After a star career at San Fernando Valley State College, where he led the Matadors to their first winning season and the Junior Rose Bowl in 1967, Lemmerman became a backup quarterback for the Atlanta Falcons in 1968 and 1969. He later played ten years in the Canadian Football League (CFL) for the Edmonton Eskimos. After his retirement from a playing career in football, Lemmerman became an assistant coach for the Eskimos, the Los Angeles Express of the United States Football League (USFL) and the NFL's Houston Oilers. Later he was hired as director of operations for Edmonton, and then worked for many years as a scout for the Kansas City Chiefs and the New Orleans Saints.

== Legacy ==
Lemmerman is the only CSUN quarterback to play in the NFL, and was inducted into the Matadors Hall of Fame in 1981. He holds multiple records at CSUN that were never surpassed, including single game records for most touchdown passes, most touchdowns through rushing, most points scored, and longest punt. He also holds the CSUN season record for most touchdown passes.
