= Ralph Heck =

American football player (1941–2025)

No. 43, 55
- Position: Linebacker

Personal information
- Born: November 6, 1941 (age 85); Pittsburgh, Pennsylvania, U.S.
- Listed height: 6 ft 1 in (1.85 m)
- Listed weight: 230 lb (104 kg)

Career information
- High school: Penn Hills (Pittsburgh)
- College: Colorado
- NFL draft: 1963: 11th round, 144th overall pick

Career history
- Philadelphia Eagles (1963–1965); Atlanta Falcons (1966–1968); New York Giants (1969–1971)

Career NFL statistics
- Fumble recoveries: 4
- Interceptions: 5
- Sacks: 7.5
- Stats at Pro Football Reference

Ralph Adam Heck (November 6, 1941 – May 25, 2025) was an American professional football player who was a linebacker for nine seasons in the National Football League (NFL) with the Philadelphia Eagles, Atlanta Falcons, and New York Giants. He played college football for the Colorado Buffaloes.

Heck died on May 25, 2025, at the age of 83.
