= Bud Ericksen =

American football player (1916–2008)

No. 18
- Position: Center

Personal information
- Born: April 10, 1916; Seattle, Washington, U.S.
- Died: April 14, 2008 (aged 92)

Career information
- College: Washington

Career history
- 1938–1939: Washington Redskins

Awards and highlights
- Second-team All-PCC (1937)
- Stats at Pro Football Reference

Carlton Lyons "Bud" Ericksen (April 10, 1916 – April 14, 2008) was an American football player. He played professionally as a center in the National Football League (NFL) for the Washington Redskins. Ericksen played college football at the University of Washington, where he had been a walk-on player.

He was raised in Bothell, Washington, where his grandfather Gerhard Erickson was among the founders of the town. Both are honored by a mural that was painted on the side of their former family store. Ericksen served as mayor of Bothell from 1969 to 1973 and owned a local car dealership that he opened after leaving the Redskins. He died at the age of 92 on April 14, 2008.
