= Jim Simon (American football) =

American football player (born 1940)

No. 83, 66
- Positions: Guard, Tackle

Personal information
- Born: March 22, 1940 (age 86); Pittsburgh, Pennsylvania, U.S.
- Listed height: 6 ft 4 in (1.93 m)
- Listed weight: 240 lb (109 kg)

Career information
- High school: Scott Twp.
- College: Miami (FL)
- NFL draft: 1963: 15th round, 208th overall pick
- AFL draft: 1963: 9th round, 71st overall pick

Career history
- Detroit Lions (1963–1965); Atlanta Falcons (1966–1968)

Career NFL statistics
- Games played: 82
- Games started: 39
- Stats at Pro Football Reference

James E. Simon (born March 22, 1940) is an American former professional football player who was an offensive lineman for the Detroit Lions and Atlanta Falcons of the National Football League (NFL) in the 1960s. He played college football for the Miami Hurricanes.

He attended Scott Township High School.
