= Dan Grimm =

American football player (1941–2018)

No. 67
- Position: Guard

Personal information
- Born: February 7, 1941; Perry, Iowa, U.S.
- Died: May 3, 2018 (aged 77); Lincolnton, North Carolina, U.S.
- Listed height: 6 ft 3 in (1.91 m)
- Listed weight: 245 lb (111 kg)

Career information
- High school: Roosevelt
- College: Colorado
- NFL draft: 1963: 5th round, 70th overall pick
- AFL draft: 1963: 20th round, 157th overall pick

Career history
- Green Bay Packers (1963–1965); Atlanta Falcons (1966–1968); Baltimore Colts (1969); Washington Redskins (1969)

Awards and highlights
- NFL champion (1965)

Career NFL statistics
- Games played: 80
- Games started: 43
- Fumble recoveries: 2
- Stats at Pro Football Reference

Daniel Jay Grimm (February 7, 1941 – May 3, 2018) was an American football offensive lineman in the National Football League (NFL) for the Green Bay Packers, Atlanta Falcons, Baltimore Colts, and the Washington Redskins. He played college football at the University of Colorado and was drafted in the fifth round of the 1963 NFL draft. Grimm was also selected in the 20th round of the 1963 AFL draft by the Denver Broncos. He died on May 3, 2018.
