= Bob Riggle =

American football player (born 1944)

No. 20
- Position: Defensive back

Personal information
- Born: February 5, 1944 (age 82); Washington, Pennsylvania, U.S.
- Listed height: 6 ft 1 in (1.85 m)
- Listed weight: 200 lb (91 kg)

Career information
- High school: Washington
- College: Penn State (1962-1965)
- NFL draft: 1966: 20th round, 291st overall pick

Career history
- Atlanta Falcons (1966–1969)

Career NFL statistics
- Interceptions: 3
- Fumble recoveries: 1
- Touchdowns: 1
- Stats at Pro Football Reference

Robert Dunbar Riggle (born February 5, 1944) is an American former professional football player who was a defensive back for the Atlanta Falcons of the National Football League (NFL). He played college football for the Penn State Nittany Lions.
