= Rankin M. Smith Sr. =

American businessman and sports team owner

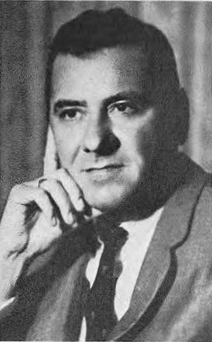
- Smith, c. 1968
- Born: October 29, 1924; Atlanta, Georgia, U.S.
- Died: October 26, 1997 (aged 72); Atlanta, Georgia, U.S.
- Education: University of Georgia
- Occupations: Atlanta Falcons owner; philanthropist

Rankin McEachern Smith Sr. (October 29, 1924 – October 26, 1997) was an American businessman and philanthropist. A longtime resident of Atlanta, Georgia, Smith was very active in the Atlanta community. Smith served as president of the Life Insurance Company of Georgia from 1970 to 1976. Smith was also the founding owner of the National Football League (NFL)'s Atlanta Falcons.

== Personal life ==
Smith was born October 29, 1924, in Atlanta, Georgia. The hospital where he was born later became part of Atlanta Stadium. He attended North Fulton High School. Following high school, he spent one year at Emory University, then transferred to the University of Georgia. While at the University of Georgia he was a member of Chi Phi fraternity. Following graduation he began working as an executive at Life Insurance Company of Georgia. He ascended to the position of president and chairman of the board in 1970. He stepped down from the board in 1976 due to his "other business interests", but reportedly he was pushed out due to his problem with alcohol. He retired in 1978. Smith was married twice. First, to the former Miriam "MeMe" Wellman (1945–1974) with whom he fathered five children: Rankin, Carroll, Dorothy Ann, Taylor and Karen. These five were the genesis behind the corporate name of the Atlanta Falcons Football Club, The Five Smiths, Inc. In 1976, he married Charlotte Topping, the widow of former New York Yankees owner Dan Topping. He died on October 26, 1997, from complications resulting from heart failure.

== Purchase of the Atlanta Falcons ==
In 1965, the unexpectedly successful American Football League wanted to expand to Atlanta. Smith, then an executive vice president at the Life Insurance Company of Georgia, was awarded an AFL franchise, but reneged on his agreement when the older National Football League offered him a franchise. He paid $8.5 million on June 30, 1965, for an NFL team based in Atlanta. Smith secured exclusive rights to Atlanta–Fulton County Stadium, where the Falcons began play in 1966 and played there for 26 seasons. Smith was instrumental in the construction of the Falcons' next stadium, the Georgia Dome, threatening to move the Falcons elsewhere if a new stadium was not built. When Smith backed out from the AFL agreement, the AFL franchise was then awarded to Miami, which would start play as the Dolphins in 1966. He named his son Rankin Smith Jr team president, where he served from 1977 to 1988.

Smith continued to manage day-to-day operations of the team until 1989, when he turned control of the team over to his son Taylor Smith (who started as a team ballboy as a kid before moving on to work at the marketing and public relations departments) although the elder Smith apparently still had a say in decisions due to the management structure being a committee by the late 1980s. In his span as full-time owner, Rankin went 129-218-5 as an owner with three playoff appearances in 24 seasons.

Months before he died, his son convinced him to hire Dan Reeves as head coach and let him have control of the personnel; twenty years prior, Smith displayed reluctance in ceding player control when inquiring about hiring Reeves. Two years later, the Falcons reached Super Bowl XXXIII.

The team was later sold to Arthur M. Blank in 2002 for $545 million.

On Interstate 985 in the northern suburbs of Atlanta, Exit 12, for Spout Springs Road, leads to the Atlanta Falcons training complex in Flowery Branch and is named in Smith's honor.

== Philanthropy ==
Smith was extremely generous and made significant donations to causes in and around Atlanta, a tradition his estate continued after his death. He was a major contributor to the Fernbank Museum of Natural History. In addition to making individual contributions, he led a fundraising drive which raised $43 million for the museum. The Museum's IMAX theater is named for Smith.

In 1985 Smith founded the Atlanta Falcons Youth Foundation. It provides grants to non-profit organizations across Georgia, focusing on programs which benefit children.

Following his death, three of Smith's children (Rankin Smith Jr., Dorothy Smith Knox, and Taylor Smith) donated $3.5 million to the University of Georgia Athletic Association in his memory. The donation was a major component of the University's “Investing in Champions” initiative. In recognition of the donation the university named the major building built under the program, a student-athlete academic center, after Smith.
