= National Register of Historic Places listings in Seneca County, Ohio =

Location of Seneca County in Ohio

This is a list of the National Register of Historic Places listings in Seneca County, Ohio.

This is intended to be a complete list of the properties and districts on the National Register of Historic Places in Seneca County, Ohio, United States. The locations of National Register properties and districts for which the latitude and longitude coordinates are included below, may be seen in an online map.

There are 45 properties and districts listed on the National Register in the county. Another property was once listed but has been removed.

This National Park Service list is complete through NPS recent listings posted September 4, 2026.

== Current listings ==
	Name on the Register	Image	Date listed	Location	City or town	Description
1	Aigler Alumni Building	Aigler Alumni Building	February 12, 1979 (#79002779)	315 E. Market St. 41°06′58″N 83°10′10″W	Tiffin	
2	Bagby-Hossler House	Bagby-Hossler House	July 10, 1986 (#86001562)	530 Sycamore St. 41°05′51″N 83°11′15″W	Tiffin	
3	Beatty Glass Company	Beatty Glass Company	January 7, 1980 (#80003217)	4th Ave. and Vine St. 41°07′51″N 83°10′59″W	Tiffin	
4	Black Student Union Center	Black Student Union Center	February 12, 1979 (#79002780)	120 Hedges St. 41°06′50″N 83°10′02″W	Tiffin	
5	Bowman's Distillery	Bowman's Distillery	January 7, 1980 (#80003218)	215 Riverside Dr. 41°07′20″N 83°10′18″W	Tiffin	
6	Camp Pittenger Historic District		February 12, 1979 (#100009723)	8877 S. Township Road 131; 40°59′44″N 83°12′03″W	McCutchenville vicinity	
7	College Hall	College Hall	February 12, 1979 (#79002778)	310 E. Market St. 41°06′59″N 83°10′04″W	Tiffin	
8	Ambrose Cory House	Ambrose Cory House	June 20, 1979 (#79001942)	957 N. Union St. 41°10′08″N 83°25′09″W	Fostoria	
9	Daughters of America National Home	Daughters of America National Home	January 23, 2003 (#02001730)	652 N. Sandusky St. 41°08′04″N 83°10′06″W	Tiffin	
10	Downtown Tiffin Historic District	Downtown Tiffin Historic District	May 2, 1978 (#78002186)	Roughly bounded by Riverside Dr., Jefferson, S. Washington St., E. Market, Madison, and Court Sts. 41°06′46″N 83°10′33″W	Tiffin	
11	Fort Ball-Railroad Historic District	Fort Ball-Railroad Historic District	June 20, 1979 (#79001944)	Roughly bounded by the Sandusky River and Perry, Sandusky and Washington Sts. 41°07′02″N 83°11′02″W	Tiffin	
12	Fostoria Downtown Historic District	Fostoria Downtown Historic District	September 28, 2001 (#01001065)	Roughly bounded by North St., South St., and the alleys east and west of Main St. 41°09′23″N 83°24′52″W	Fostoria	
13	Founders Hall, Heidelberg College	Founders Hall, Heidelberg College	March 20, 1973 (#73001534)	Perry St. (State Route 18); 41°06′59″N 83°10′02″W	Tiffin	
14	France Hall	France Hall	February 12, 1979 (#79002776)	119 Greenfield St. 41°06′55″N 83°09′52″W	Tiffin	
15	Gerhart-Rust Residence	Gerhart-Rust Residence	February 12, 1979 (#79002766)	285 E. Perry St. 41°07′00″N 83°10′06″W	Tiffin	
16	Great Hall	Great Hall	February 12, 1979 (#79002777)	44 Greenfield St. 41°06′53″N 83°10′06″W	Tiffin	
17	Hanson Machinery Company	Hanson Machinery Company	January 7, 1980 (#80003219)	235 Miami St. 41°07′11″N 83°11′16″W	Tiffin	
18	Hedges-Hunter-Keller-Bacon Gristmill	Hedges-Hunter-Keller-Bacon Gristmill	January 7, 1980 (#80003220)	255 Riverside Dr. 41°07′25″N 83°10′14″W	Tiffin	
19	Henny Barn	Henny Barn	November 6, 1979 (#79003646)	Western half of the southwestern corner of section 1, on the northern side of County Road 34 east of the northwestern railroad tracks and east of Flat Rock; 41°14′29″N 82°50′50″W	Thompson Township	
20	Heter Farm	Heter Farm	March 29, 1979 (#79001941)	8531 N. County Road 29, southwest of Bellevue; 41°14′45″N 82°51′33″W	Thompson Township	
21	William Hunter House	William Hunter House	January 7, 1980 (#80003221)	260 Riverside Dr. 41°07′23″N 83°10′12″W	Tiffin	
22	Junior Order United American Mechanics National Orphans' Home	Junior Order United American Mechanics National Orphans' Home	October 1, 1990 (#90001499)	600 N. River Rd. 41°07′55″N 83°09′33″W	Tiffin	
23	Laird Hall	Laird Hall	February 12, 1979 (#79002775)	70 Greenfield St. 41°06′54″N 83°09′59″W	Tiffin	
24	Miami Street Grade School	Miami Street Grade School	March 21, 1979 (#79001945)	155 Miami St. 41°07′06″N 83°11′04″W	Tiffin	
25	Michaels Farm	Michaels Farm	November 29, 1979 (#79001943)	South of Kansas on State Route 635; 41°13′43″N 83°16′46″W	Liberty Township	
26	Mueller Brewery	Mueller Brewery	January 7, 1980 (#80003222)	146-164 Riverside Dr. 41°07′11″N 83°10′21″W	Tiffin	
27	Christ Mueller House	Christ Mueller House	January 7, 1980 (#80003223)	140-142 Riverside Dr. 41°07′11″N 83°10′22″W	Tiffin	
28	North Sandusky Street Historic District	North Sandusky Street Historic District	May 27, 1980 (#80003224)	N. Sandusky St. 41°07′23″N 83°10′49″W	Tiffin	
29	Northeast Tiffin Historic District	Northeast Tiffin Historic District	May 28, 1980 (#80003225)	Clinton, Ohio, and Hunter Sts. 41°07′12″N 83°10′09″W	Tiffin	
30	The Octagon	The Octagon	February 12, 1979 (#79002764)	297 E. Perry St. 41°07′00″N 83°10′05″W	Tiffin	
31	Ohio Lantern Company	Ohio Lantern Company	January 7, 1980 (#80003226)	60-72 Hudson St. 41°07′13″N 83°10′47″W	Tiffin	
32	Omar Chapel	Omar Chapel	November 5, 1987 (#87001982)	408 State Route 4, north of Attica; 41°07′06″N 82°51′46″W	Reed Township	
33	Pfleiderer Center for Religion and the Humanities	Pfleiderer Center for Religion and the Humanities	February 12, 1979 (#79002773)	28 Greenfield St. 41°06′55″N 83°10′05″W	Tiffin	
34	Pleasant Ridge United Methodist Church and Cemetery	Pleasant Ridge United Methodist Church and Cemetery	September 10, 1993 (#93000880)	Junction of State Route 101 and County Road 38, northeast of Tiffin; 41°10′05″N 83°05′58″W	Pleasant Township	
35	President's House	President's House	February 12, 1979 (#79002768)	67 Greenfield St. 41°06′56″N 83°09′59″W	Tiffin	
36	St. Boniface Roman Catholic Church, School, Rectory, and Convent of the Sisters of the Precious Blood	St. Boniface Roman Catholic Church, School, Rectory, and Convent of the Sisters of the Precious Blood	November 17, 1982 (#82001487)	N. Perry St. 41°03′16″N 83°19′17″W	New Riegel	
37	Social Science House	Social Science House	February 12, 1979 (#79002782)	266 E. Market St. 41°06′55″N 83°10′12″W	Tiffin	
38	Springdale	Springdale	August 26, 1993 (#93000878)	318 Sycamore St. 41°06′09″N 83°10′56″W	Tiffin	
39	Tiffin Agricultural Works	Tiffin Agricultural Works	January 7, 1980 (#80003227)	40 Harrison St. 41°07′13″N 83°10′32″W	Tiffin	
40	Tiffin Art Metal Company	Tiffin Art Metal Company	January 7, 1980 (#80003228)	450 Wall St. 41°07′39″N 83°11′14″W	Tiffin	
41	Tiffin Waterworks	Tiffin Waterworks	January 7, 1980 (#80003229)	170 Ella St. 41°06′16″N 83°11′14″W	Tiffin	
42	Umsted Farm	Umsted Farm	April 27, 1979 (#79001946)	North of Tiffin on County Road 38; 41°10′05″N 83°09′37″W	Pleasant Township	
43	Wagner Brothers Bottling Works	Wagner Brothers Bottling Works	January 7, 1980 (#80003230)	250-258 Benner St. 41°06′52″N 83°11′04″W	Tiffin	
44	Webster Manufacturing	Webster Manufacturing	January 7, 1980 (#80003231)	325 Hall St. 41°07′26″N 83°11′24″W	Tiffin	
45	Williard Hall	Williard Hall	February 12, 1979 (#79002771)	116 Greenfield St. 41°06′52″N 83°09′52″W	Tiffin	

== Former listing ==
	Name on the Register	Image	Date listed	Date removed	Location	City or town	Description
1	Fine Arts Building		February 12, 1979 (#79002770)	January 31, 1995	338 E. Perry St. 41°07′00″N 83°09′58″W	Tiffin	

== See also ==
- List of National Historic Landmarks in Ohio
- Listings in neighboring counties: Crawford, Hancock, Huron, Sandusky, Wood, Wyandot
- National Register of Historic Places listings in Ohio
