= Elizabeth Tyler =

Elizabeth Tyler may refer to:

- Elizabeth Tyler (1823–1850), daughter of John Tyler, president of the United States
- Elizabeth Tyler (KKK organizer) (1881–1924), Atlanta public-relations professional and Ku Klux Klan organizer
- Elizabeth M. Tyler, professor of medieval literature at the University of York
