= Bob Sherman (American football) =

American football player (born 1942)

No. 49
- Position: Defensive back

Personal information
- Born: July 4, 1942 (age 84); Owosso, Michigan, U.S.
- Listed height: 6 ft 2 in (1.88 m)
- Listed weight: 195 lb (88 kg)

Career information
- High school: Durand (Durand, Michigan)
- College: Iowa (1960–1963)
- NFL draft: 1964: 12th round, 163rd overall pick

Career history
- Pittsburgh Steelers (1964–1965); Atlanta Falcons (1966)*
- * Offseason or practice squad member only
- Stats at Pro Football Reference

Robert David Sherman (born July 4, 1942) is an American former professional football defensive back who played for the Pittsburgh Steelers of the National Football League (NFL). He played college football for the Iowa Hawkeyes and was selected by the Steelers in the 12th round of the 1964 NFL draft.

== Early life ==
Robert David Sherman was born on July 4, 1942, in Owosso, Michigan. He attended Durand High School in Durand, Michigan.

== College career ==
Sherman enrolled at the University of Iowa to play college football for the Hawkeyes. He was on the freshman team in 1960 as a quarterback. He played for the varsity team in 1961 as a halfback/defensive back but not enough to earn a letter. Sherman was a two-year varsity letterman from 1962 to 1963. He finished his college career with 41 carries for 118 yards and 11 receptions for 48 yards.

== Professional career ==
Sherman was selected by the Pittsburgh Steelers in the 12th round, with the 163rd overall pick, of the 1964 NFL draft. He began the 1964 season playing exclusively on special teams. He made his first start at defensive back on November 15, 1964, against the Washington Redskins after Clendon Thomas was moved to split end. Sherman played in all 14 games, starting three, overall for the Steelers in 1964. He appeared in 11 games, starting three, during the 1965 season and made an interception for 35 yards.

Sherman was chosen by the Atlanta Falcons in the 1966 NFL expansion draft. He was released on August 21, 1966, after the fourth of five preseason games.

== Personal life ==
After his NFL career, Sherman worked at Merrill Lynch for 33 years before retiring in 2000. His final job title was "Sr. Vice President and Co-National Sales Director of the Private Client Group".
