= Bagby–Hossler House =

Historic house in Ohio, United States

- U.S. National Register of Historic Places
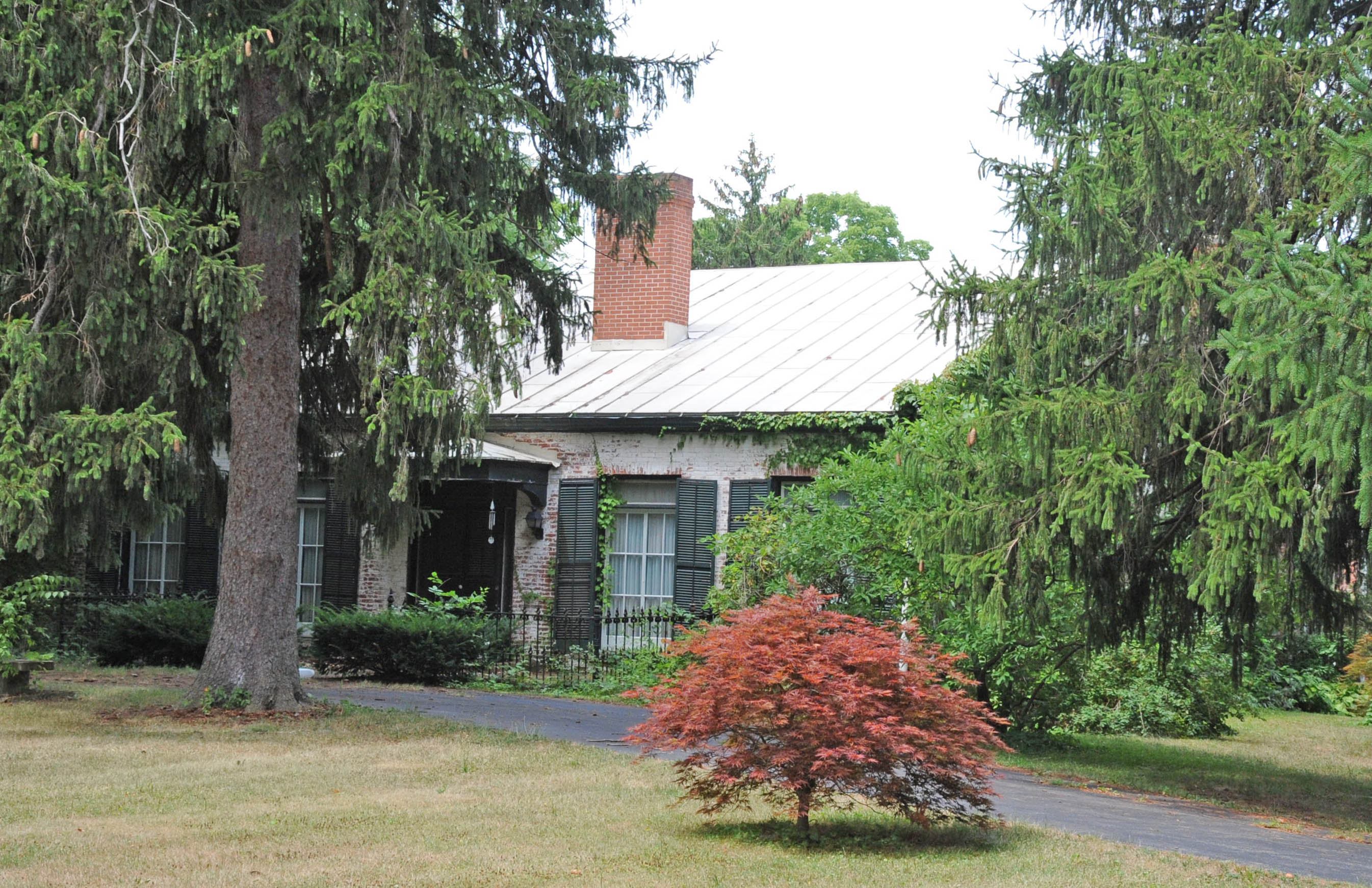
- Front of the house in 2016

- Location within Ohio Location within the United States
- Location: 530 Sycamore St., Tiffin, Ohio; 1822 Sycamore St. after renumbering
- Coordinates: 41°6′9.70″N 83°10′54.49″W
- Built: 1862, 1930
- Architect: Arthur Hossler (1930)
- NRHP reference No.: 86001562
- Added to NRHP: 10 July 1986

Bagby–Hossler House is a historic house in Tiffin, Ohio.

== Description ==
The house is situated on a 3-acre (1.2 ha) lot that slopes gently to the Sandusky River. It is located at 530 Sycamore Street. The rectangular brick building rests on a rubble stone foundation. It is built into a hill is one and one half stories on the facade and 2 1/2 stories in the rear. The gable roof] has two shed dormers on the rear side and there are three tall chimneys.

The five bay facade has a central six panel door with sidelights and a transom, and a metal hood covering supported by consoles. Four pair of French doors with unusual glazing and full length louvered shutters flank the central entry. The curved or domed windows in these doors distort the view and are considered unique in Ohio. As of 1986, the interior was in excellent and near original condition. Original features including plaster cornices and medallions, poplar woodwork and porcelain key hole covers remained.

In addition to the main house built in 1862, additions and other structures and features from 1930 are historically significant. It was listed in the National Register of Historic Places on July 10, 1986.

== History ==
Thomas H. Bagby was a lawyer and public official of some notoriety in Seneca County, Ohio. Arriving from New York in 1845 when he was 22 before building this house he had built a Gothic Revival style house on North Sandusky in 1855. Bagby purchased 18 acres (7.3 ha) of land on the outskirts of Tiffin along the Sandusky River in 1862 when he built what came to be known as the Bagby–Hossler House there. The domed glass was reportedly to distort the view of his jealously guarded wife. These unique windows are a reflection of the sophistication of the glass industry in Ohio at the time.

Bagby gained a measure of notoriety when appointed as a county commissioner in 1882 local newspaper editor O.T. Locke purported the selection of Arthur L. Hossler Sr. as architect for the county courthouse was fixed. Bagby went on to win election as commissioner in 1884 and served until 1891, dying in 1906.

Bagby's widow died in 1915 and the property had suffered some deterioration by 1930 when Arthur Hassler purchased it from her estate. Hossler did extensive renovations and improvements to the property. Hossler, born in Seneca County in 1882, began building houses in 1914. He went on to form a contracting company with his brothers that moved into larger commercial and civic construction, for example the Holland Theatre. When the house was listed in 1986, Hossler Brothers was still an active and significant construction firm in the county, but it shut down in 2000.

== See also ==
- Historic preservation
- National Register of Historic Places in Seneca County, Ohio
