= Southern Publicity Association =

The Southern Publicity Association was a fund-raising agency whose clients included the Anti-Saloon League, the Ku Klux Klan and the Red Cross. The firm was owned and operated by Edward Young Clarke and Mary Elizabeth Tyler. While working with the Klan during its resurgence in the 1920s, the agency was paid for signing up members. They organized recruiters on the national level who were also paid a commission. Their Klan recruitment operation was largely successful in the Southern United States.

== Background ==
Founding member Elizabeth Tyler was the first major female Klan leader of the 1920s and Edward Clarke had previous experience with fraternal organizations, having previously worked with the Woodmen of the World. Tyler herself was a member of the Daughters of America, which was a female organization associated with the Junior Order of United American Mechanics (an anti-Catholic fraternal organization). When Tyler and Clarke first met, Clarke was a festival organizer in the American South. They met when they were both involved in the "great Harvest Festival" in Atlanta, Georgia. Together they created the Southern Publicity Association. During the early years of the Association, they worked with low-revenue generating clients like the Red Cross, the Salvation Army and the YMCA.

== Ku Klux Klan ==
They entered into a contract with William Joseph Simmons, agreeing to recruit members for the Klan in exchange for a percentage of the $10 initiation fee. Within six months they had recruited 85,000 new members for the Klan. They accomplished this by expanding the Klan's traditional Reconstruction era hatred of blacks. During this period of the Klan's second resurgence, under the guidance of the Southern Publicity Association, the Klan targeted Catholics, Jews, nonwhites, Bolsheviks and immigrants. Paid organizers, called Kleagles would identify sources of conflict for native-born White Protestants on the community level, and target those groups in their recruitment campaigns.

Tyler has said that the Association was first put in touch with Simmons after her son-in-law joined the Klan. She has said:

We found Colonel Simmons was having a hard time [getting] along. He couldn't pay his rent. The receipts were not sufficient to take care of his personal needs. He was a minister and a clean living and thinking man, and he was heart and soul for the success of the Ku Klux Klan. After we had investigated it from every angle, we decided to go into it with Colonel Simmons and give it the impetus that it could best get from publicity.

Their campaign to promote the Klan emphasized anti-Catholiscm and "one hundred percent Americanism". They promoted the Klan's image of guarding socially conservative values by advertising Klan opposition to bootlegging, gambling, drugs, sexual liberty, Sabbath violation, non-traditional gender roles and "virtually anything and everything that might be deemed morally scandalous."

== Other clients ==
- The Theodore Roosevelt Memorial Association, who sued Clarke alleging that he had embezzled $1,000 and claiming another $4,000 was unaccounted for
- Armenian Relief Fund
