= Larry Benz =

American football player (born 1941)

No. 23
- Position: Safety

Personal information
- Born: January 28, 1941 (age 85); Chattanooga, Tennessee, U.S.
- Listed height: 5 ft 11 in (1.80 m)
- Listed weight: 185 lb (84 kg)

Career information
- High school: Cleveland Heights (Cleveland Heights, Ohio)
- College: Northwestern
- NFL draft: 1963: undrafted

Career history
- Cleveland Browns (1963–1965)

Awards and highlights
- NFL champion (1964)

Career NFL statistics
- Interceptions: 16
- Fumble recoveries: 2
- Stats at Pro Football Reference

Larry Walker Benz (born January 28, 1941) is an American former professional football player who was a safety in the National Football League (NFL). He played college football for the Northwestern Wildcats and signed with the Cleveland Browns as an undrafted free agent.

== Early life ==
Benz attended Cleveland Heights High School in Cleveland Heights, Ohio, where he earned eight letters in football, baseball, basketball, and track.

== College career ==
Benz played college football at Northwestern University, primarily as a running back, but also as a safety and occasionally as a quarterback. As a junior in 1961, he threw two touchdown passes to lead the Wildcats to a 12–10 victory over Notre Dame. Benz was an honorable mention all-Big Ten Conference selection as a senior. He graduated with a degree in geography and history.

== Professional career ==
After going unselected in the 1963 NFL draft, Benz was signed by the Cleveland Browns as an undrafted free agent and became a regular member of their defensive unit as a safety after the accidental death of Don Fleming in the offseason. As a rookie, Benz tied for the team lead for interceptions with seven. In 1964, he recorded four interceptions and helped the Browns defeat the Baltimore Colts in the NFL Championship Game. In his third season with the team, he led the team with five interceptions.

In February 1966, Benz was one of three Browns players selected by the newly created Atlanta Falcons in the 1966 NFL expansion draft. However, he quit the team suddenly in July.

== Personal life ==
Benz is of German descent and has two older brothers named Tom and Dick. He and his wife Dalia lived in Euclid, Ohio, during his time on the Browns. After his playing career, Benz started his own construction business.
