= Daughters of America =

American secret society Nativist organization

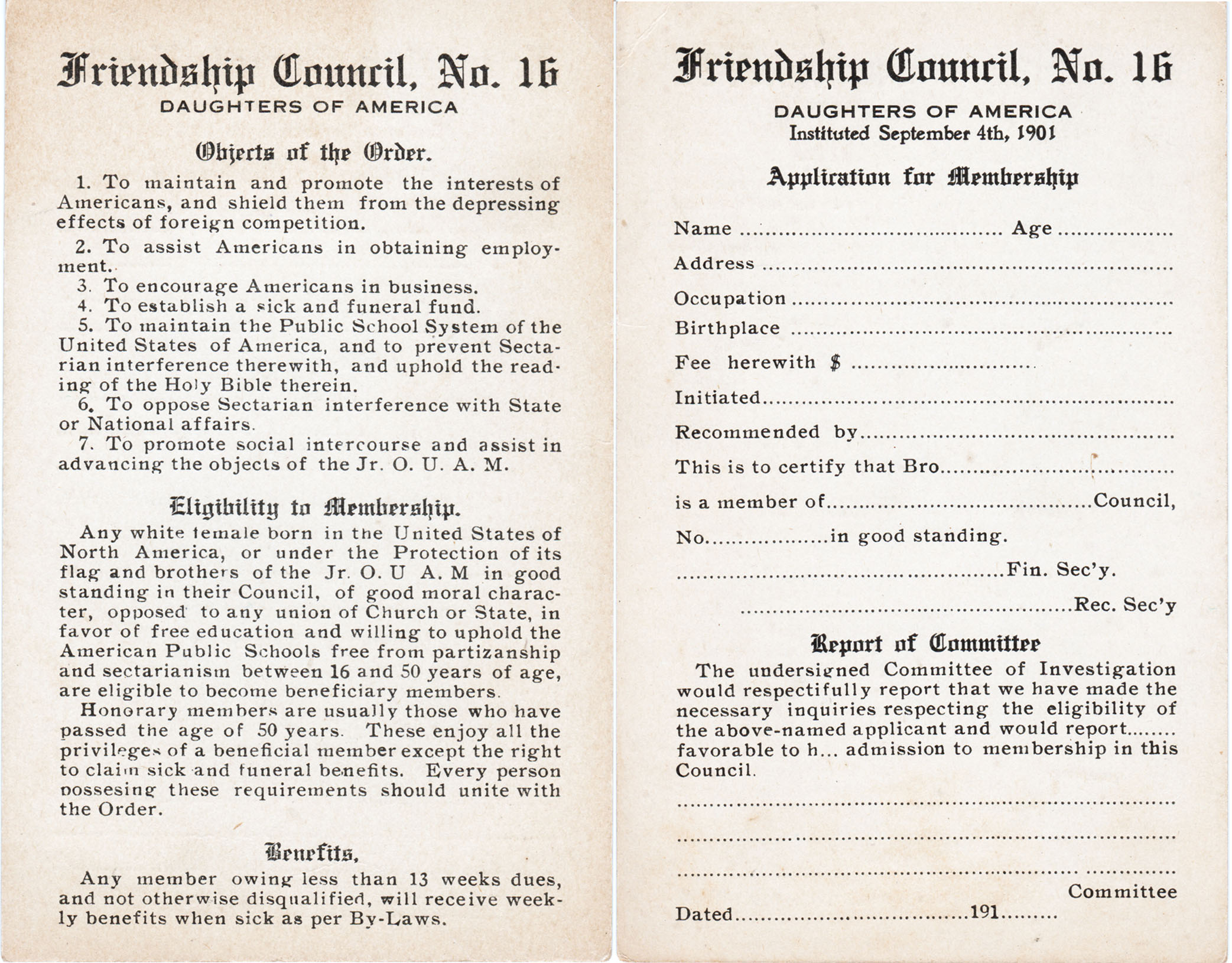
Daughters of America Friendship Council No 16 Application for Membership

The Daughters of America is an American secret society, Nativist organization dating from the late-19th century. It was founded in 1891 as an auxiliary of the Junior Order of United American Mechanics. Since its heyday in the 1930s, the organization is believed to have shrunk significantly, to the point that it is no longer known whether or not it still exists.

== History ==
Both the JOUAM and the Daughters of America are descended from the Order of United American Mechanics, founded in 1845. The Junior Order of United American Mechanics, as its name suggests, was meant to be the youth affiliate of the Order. The OUAM founded a ladies auxiliary, the Daughters of Liberty in the 1870s. The JOUAM split from the OUAM in 1885. When the JOUAM decided to form a Daughters of Liberty group in 1891, the older Order objected. The Daughters of America were formed instead. The "National Council, Daughters of American" was chartered in Allegheny County, Pennsylvania. Though it was always considered the auxiliary of JOUAM, it was only officially recognized in 1926. (Another source gives its date of founding as 1888.)

According to The International Encyclopedia of Secret Societies and Fraternal Orders, The Daughters of America was still operational in 1997 and tax returns for the Daughters of America National Council have been filed as recently as 2019.

== Organization and membership ==
The Daughters of America was organized on three levels. Local groups were called Councils, state groups were called State Councils, and the overall structure was called the National Council. Its headquarters was located in Harrisburg, Ohio, in 1979.

1946 meeting in Wheelwright, Kentucky

In 1923 there were 1,000 local Councils with slightly more than 115,000 members in 32 states. By 1930 the organization reported having over 160,000 members in 33 states. Its membership numbers were reduced to about 19,000 in 26 states by 1978.

Originally, the order was open to white American women over 16, as well as members of the JOUAM. Later, in a pamphlet described as "recent" in 1979, the order was described as open to "PATRIOTIC, WHITE MALE AND FEMALE CITIZENS OF GOOD MORAL CHARACTER, WHO BELIEVE IN A SUPREME BEING AS THE CREATOR AND PRESERVER of the Universe and who favor the upholding the American Public School System and the reading of the Holy Bible in the schools thereof, must be opposed to the union of Church and State; must be literate and capable of giving all the secret signs and words of the Order, or of explaining them if unable to give them by reason of some physical misfortune or defect."

== Rituals and secrecy ==
The Daughters had as part of their association various ritual activities, about which there was maintained a strict code of secrecy as late as 1970. The association were also strict about not discussing its business outside of the Council rooms.

== Philanthropy and benefits ==
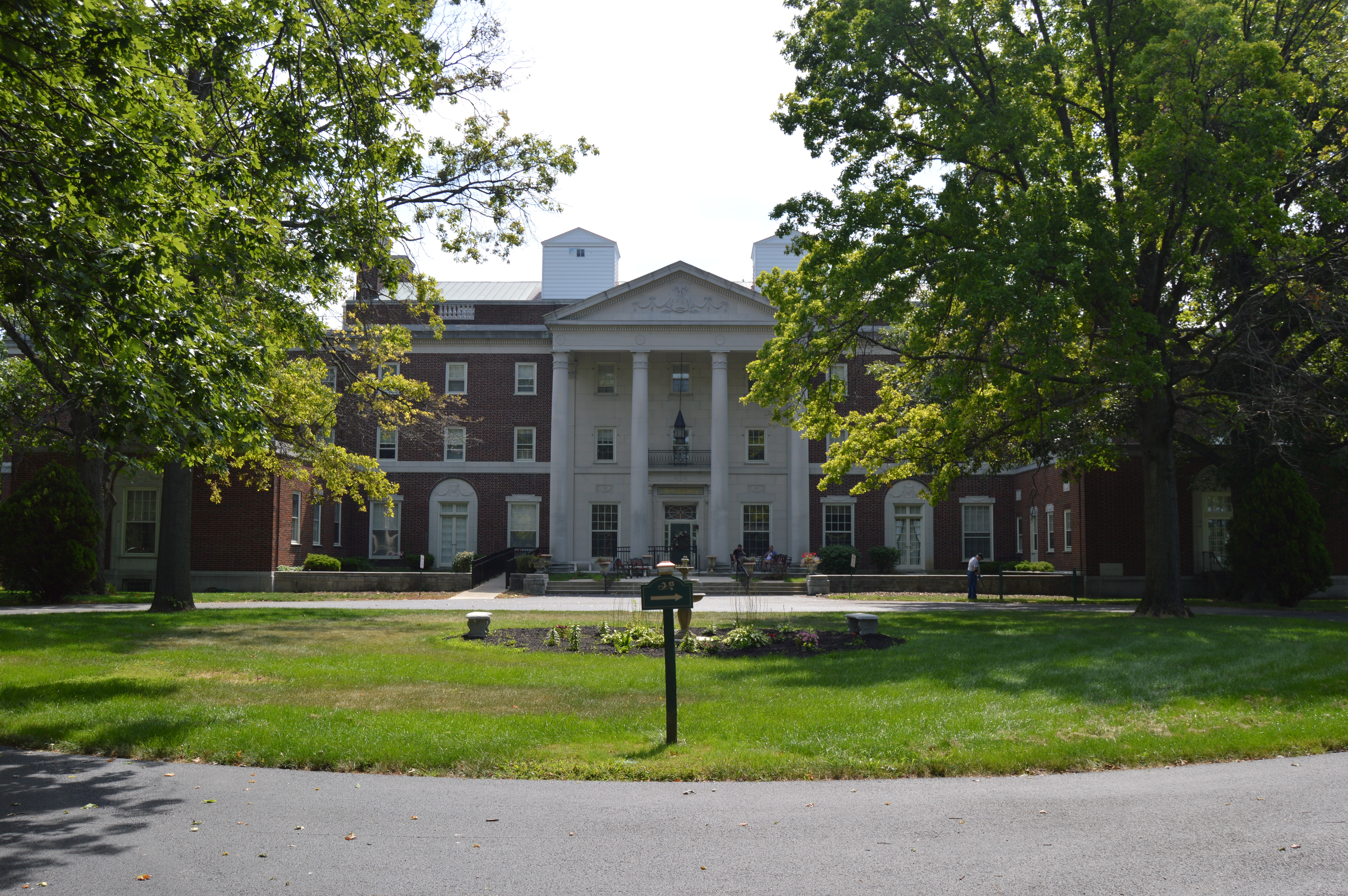
The National Home

In 1907 the Daughters of America created a Funeral Benefit Department. In 1930, the organization opened the Daughters of America National Home in Tiffin, Ohio. Those members wishing to reside there had two options: turn over all their income and properties to the home or join a "contributing plan" which required a monthly fee of $275. Any member 62 or older who had been a member of the order for at least fifteen years was eligible to stay at the home.

Instead of an orphanage, the Daughters of America created an early form of foster care called the "Helping Hands System". A manager would find suitable homes for the children and a stipend for their support was paid out of the funds of the department, raised by voluntary contributions from the local branches. By the 1970s this had evolved into a financial aid toward the education of children under 18 in the event of the members death.

An insurance concern, the Daughters of America, National Council, was established in 1907 and admitted men and women. There were 97,340 member in 973 lodges in 1923. It was headquartered at 708 State Avenue, Cincinnati, Ohio as of 1923.

== Beliefs ==
Members were required to endorse the Daughters of America mission statement:

Council of the Daughters of America, a patriotic fraternity, which seeks to aid in preserving and perpetuating the Public School system; to instill a spirit of patriotism into the youth of our land; to place our flag over every schoolhouse; to promote the reading of the Holy Bible therein; and to protest against the immigration of paupers, criminals, and the enemies of our social order. If you endorse the objects of this Order, raise your right hand and repeat after me the following: CALLING UPON ALMIGHTY GOD TO WITNESS,--I DO SOLEMNLY VOW,--THAT I SEEK MEMBERSHIP--IN THIS ORDER WITH HONEST PURPOSE,--TO ASSIST TO THE EXTENT OF MY ABILITY--IN CARRYING OUT THE OBJECTS AND PRINCIPLES OF THIS ORDER. I SOLEMNLY PROMISE TO KEEP SECRET--ALL I HAVE SEEN OR HEARD,--OR MAY SEE OR HEAR,--DURING MY INITIATION.

According to its 1978 regulations, the Daughters of America professed the following principles for its members:

1. Promoting and maintaining American interests by shielding the country from unrestricted immigration
2. Helping Americans find employment
3. Encouraging American businesses
4. Providing support for the American public school system in upholding Bible reading in the public schools
5. Opposing sectarian influences in state and national affairs
6. Promoting and advancing the Jr. Order of United American Mechanics
7. Establishing the funds to support orphans of deceased members of the organization
8. Establishing funds to provide for the aged and infirm members of the order.

== Notable members ==
- Mary Elizabeth Tyler, founder of the Southern Publicity Association
