= Elizabeth M. Tyler =

Professor of Medieval Literature

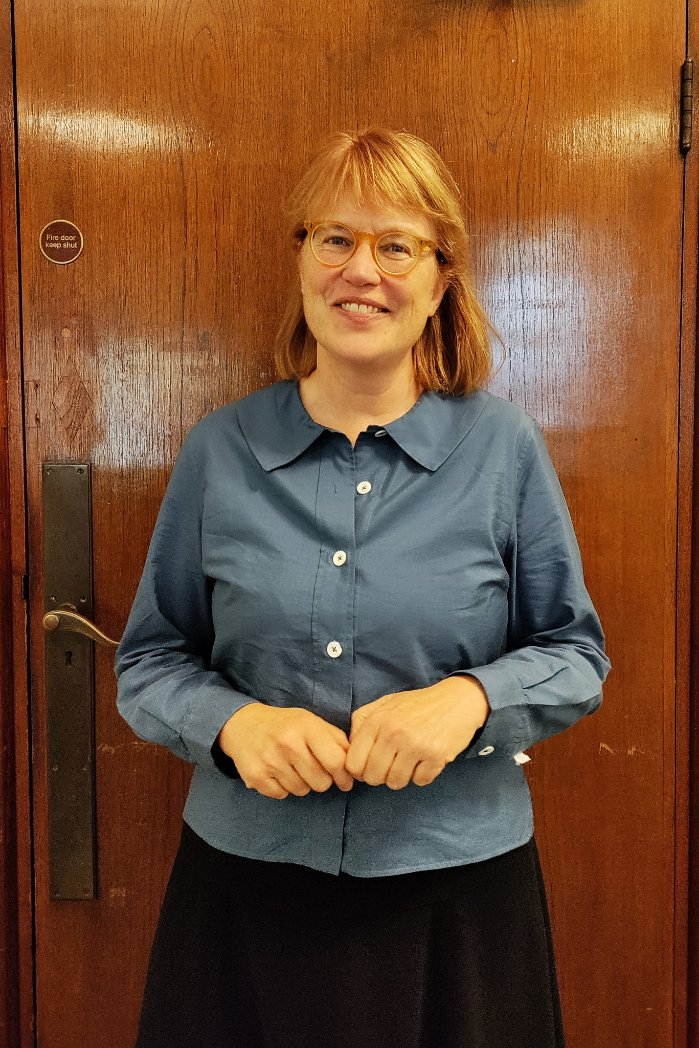
Elizabeth M. Tyler, 27 May 2022, the Institute of Classical Studies, School of Advanced Study, University of London

Elizabeth M. Tyler FBA is Professor of Medieval Literature at the University of York. She is a co-director of the Centre for Medieval Literature at the University of Southern Denmark and the University of York. She is an expert in the literary culture of England from the ninth to the twelfth centuries. She was made a Fellow of the British Academy in 2026.

== Education ==
Tyler received her DPhil from the University of Oxford in 1994. Her doctoral thesis was titled The Collocation of Words for Treasure in Old English Verse. The thesis used a study of the collocation of words for treasure to address the question of the relationship between the conventionality and originality of Old English verse.

== Career ==
Tyler was appointed at the University of York in 1995. She is an editor of an open-access journal, Interfaces: A Journal of Medieval European Literatures. She is a general editor for the Studies in the Early Middle Ages series, published by Brepols. She is an editorial board member for the Old English Series of the Dumbarton Oaks Medieval Library, published by Harvard University Press. Tyler is an executive committee member for Carmen: The Worldwide Medieval Network.

== Bibliography ==
- (ed. by Elizabeth M. Tyler and M. J. Toswell) Studies in English Language and Literature: 'Doubt Wisely', Papers in Honour of E.G. Stanley (London: Routledge, 1996)
- (ed. by Elizabeth M. Tyler) Treasure in the medieval West (York : York Medieval Press, 2000)
- Old English Poetics: the Aesthetics of the Familiar in Anglo-Saxon England (Cambridge: Cambridge University Press, 2006)
- (ed. by Elizabeth M. Tyler and Ross Balzaretti) Narrative and History in the Early Medieval West (Turnhout: Brepols, 2006)
- (ed.) Conceptualizing Multilingualism in Medieval England, c.800-c.1250 (Turnhout : Brepols, 2011)
- England in Europe: English Royal Women and Literary Patronage, c.1000-1150 (Toronto: University of Toronto Press, 2017)
- (ed. by Jennifer Jahner, Emily Steiner and Elizabeth M. Tyler) Medieval historical writing: Britain and Ireland, 500-1500 (Cambridge: Cambridge University Press, 2019)
