= Daughters of America National Home =

Historic retirement home in Tiffin, Ohio

- U.S. National Register of Historic Places
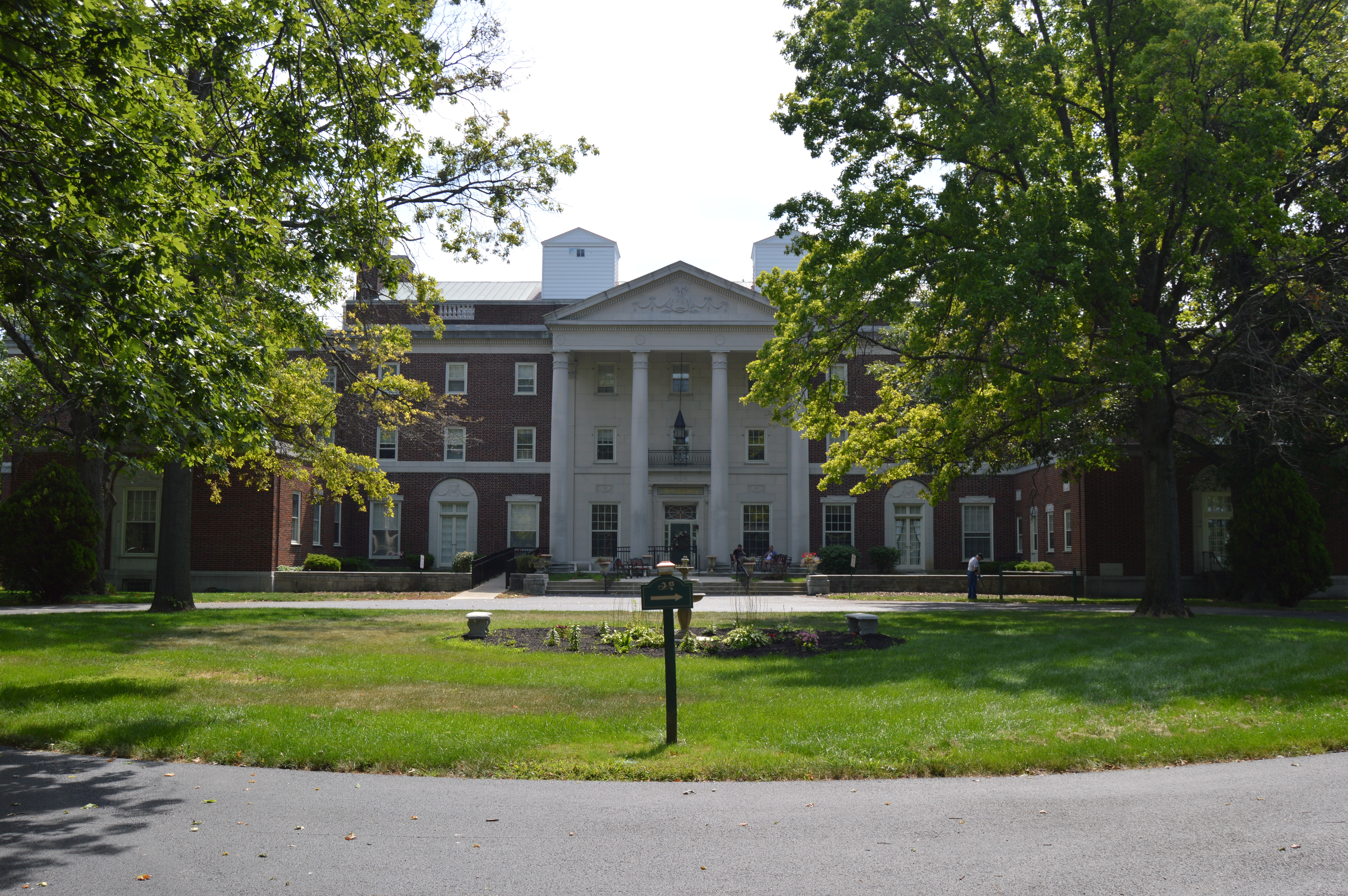
- The restored building in 2014

- Location within Ohio Location within the United States
- Location: 652 North Sandusky Street, Tiffin, Ohio 44883
- Coordinates: 41°08′04″N 83°10′06″W
- Area: 3.6 acres (1.5 ha)
- Built: 1930
- Built by: Hossler Brothers of Tiffin
- Architect: Mills, Rhines, Bellman & Nordhoff of Toledo
- Founder: Julia T. Roth
- Architectural style: Georgian Revival with Neoclassical entrance
- Restored: 2004
- NRHP reference No.: 02001730
- Added to NRHP: January 23, 2003

The Daughters of America National Home is a historic building in Tiffin, Ohio opened in 1930 and now known as Coventry House. The National Register of Historic Places listed the Daughters of America facility in 2003.

== History ==
The Daughters of America was a secret society and an anti-immigration nativist group. They were also the women's auxiliary of the Junior Order of United American Mechanics (JOUAM) fraternal organization. Julia T. Roth, national secretary, proposed for a fraternal retirement home which the Daughters endorsed in 1920.

Following a national site search, the group selected Tiffin because the city offered undeveloped riverfront property and a donation of $10,000 (equivalent to $190,000 in 2025). The location was also just across the Sandusky River from the JOUAM's orphanage, built in 1896. Construction began in 1928 and, when completed in 1930, the new institution's building costs were paid in full with funds left over for an endowment.

The design for the National Home included space for about 100 residents plus eight hospital beds. By 1932, 19 members had moved into the building, and usage peaked in the late 1950s and early 1960s with 79 residents. Only 13 residents remained when the facility closed in 1989 and the furniture was sold at auction. A nine-hole Towne & Country Golf Course took over the estate in 1995, using the first floor as a club house and pro shop. That enterprise folded after a few years, leaving the building completely vacant.

During this period, the original 52-acre campus began shrinking to the current 3.6 acres. In the late 1990s, 24 condominiums were built and the Woda Group built Tall Trees, a senior housing development. Woda Group is an Ohio-based company managing dozens of affordable housing developments.

In 2004 Woda began a $3.5 million project to refurbish the National Home and return to its original use as a retirement home, now renamed as "Coventry House". Seneca County coordinated this adaptive reuse utilizing federal tax credits. Woda later built the adjacent Devon House, a third senior housing option in the complex.

== Architecture ==
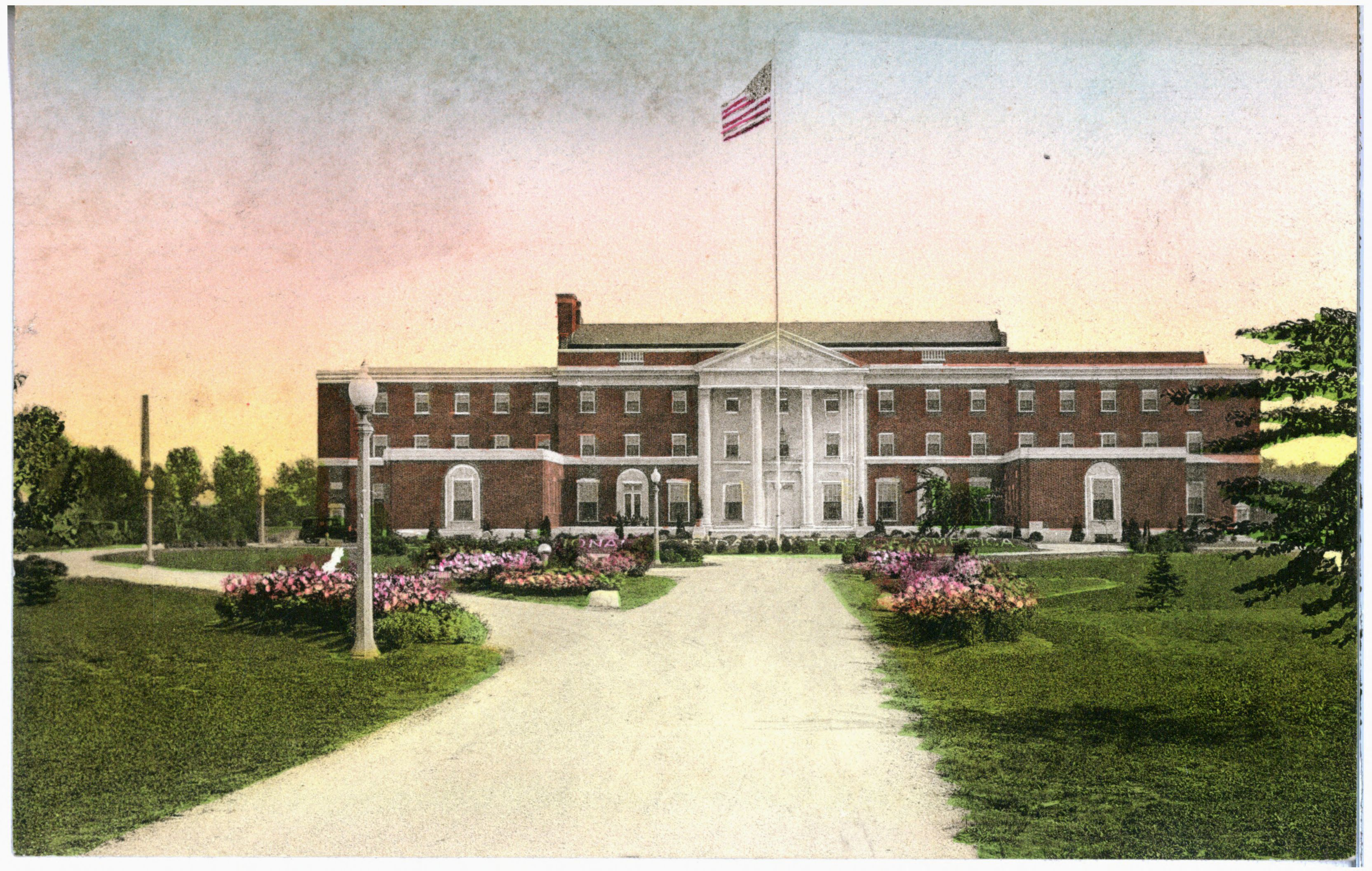
Early picture without large trees

The Daughters of America hired the prominent architectural firm of Mills, Rhines, Bellman & Nordhoff to design their National Home. The Georgian Revival building is four stories tall with three one-story projections: one on each side of the faced and another on the back.

The building facade consists of 21 bays with red Flemish brick. Stone details accent the building including the foundation, water table, stringcourse, and urn decorations. Some of the first-floor windows have decorative stone lintels and slightly recessed round brick arches while all the upper story windows have lintels with radiating voussoirs. The fourth floor has a gabled roof with dormers and is set back to create a large roof terrace surrounded by parapet. On the roof are two large pyramid chimneys, one of which is false to maintain symmetry.

In contrast to the rest of the brick building, the formal entrance employs a neoclassical style using limestone. A prominent three-story portico includes four round pillars and two square embedded pilasters, all topped with simplified Corinthian capitals. Above each column is a stone circle in the frieze. The official shield of the Daughters of America with swags on each side decorates the pediment.

The interior of the building consists of formal commons rooms on the first floor including a main entry, reception area, living room, main dining room, side dining room, smoking room, infirmary, board room, sun room and library. The more modest upper floors originally included over 100 dormitory style units with shared bathrooms on each hall. During the renovations in 2004, these rooms were grouped to provide bathrooms and kitchenettes resulting in 30 modern apartments.

== Gallery ==
Postcards with hand-colored photographs
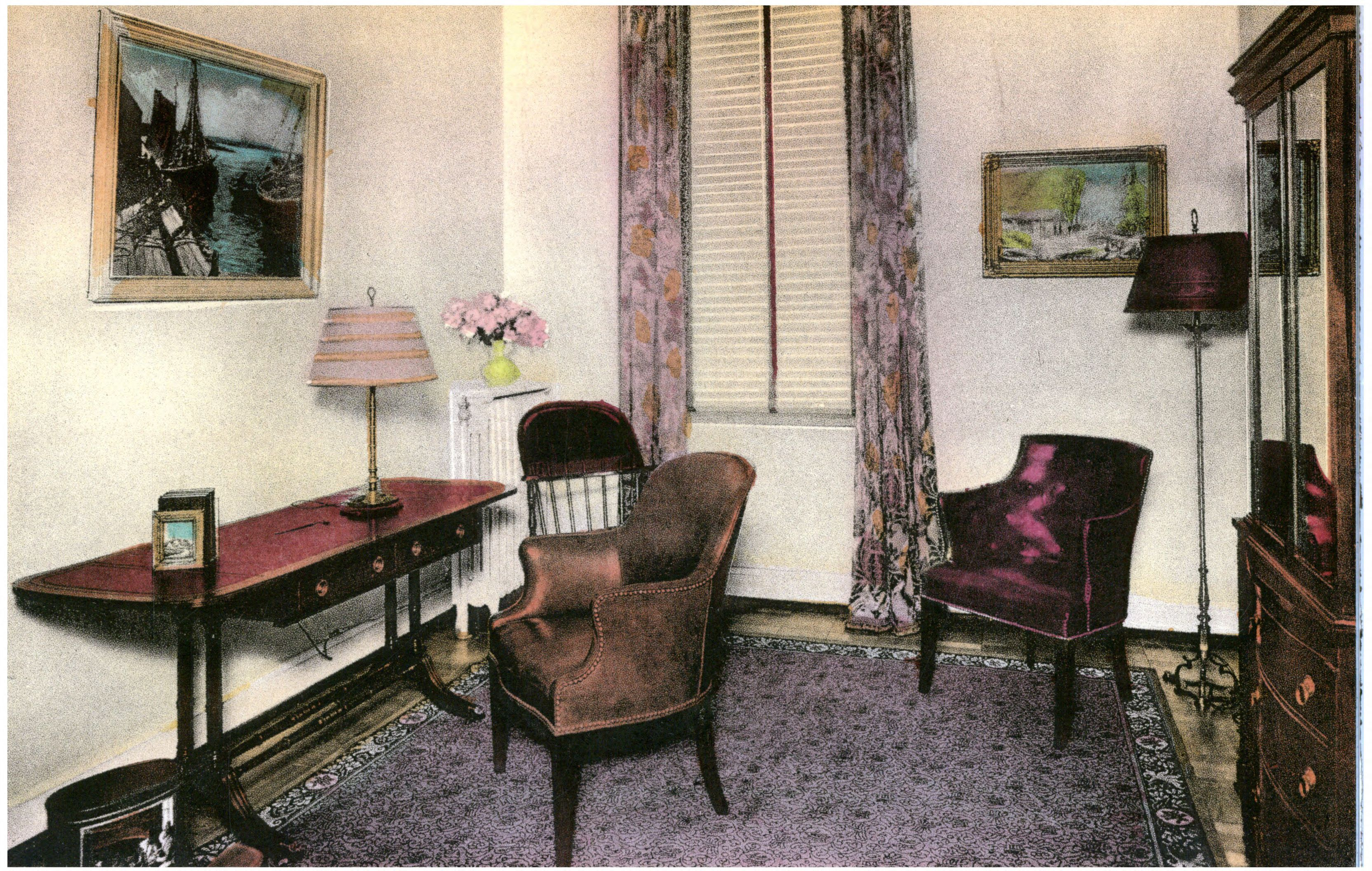
Consultation room

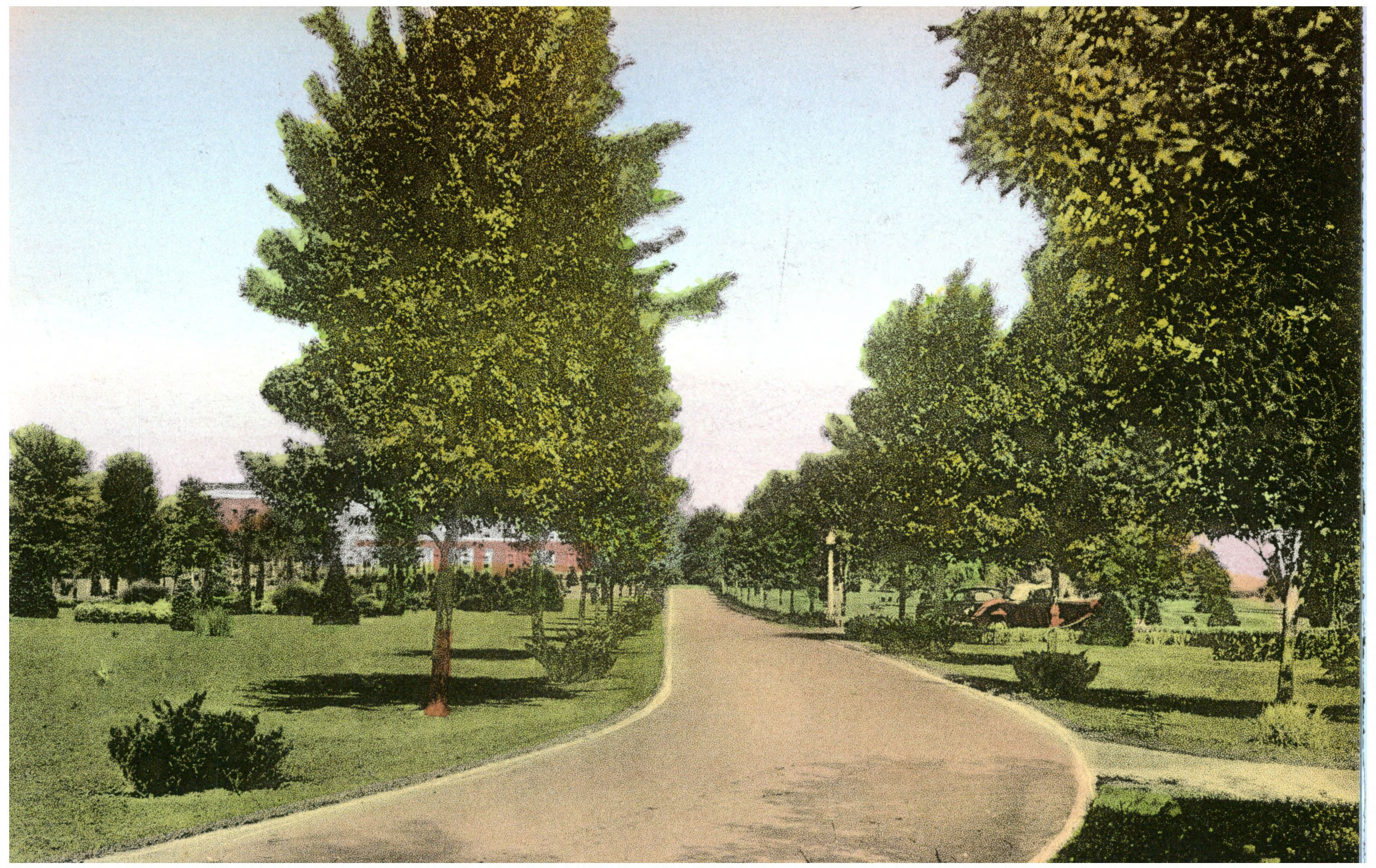
Driveway

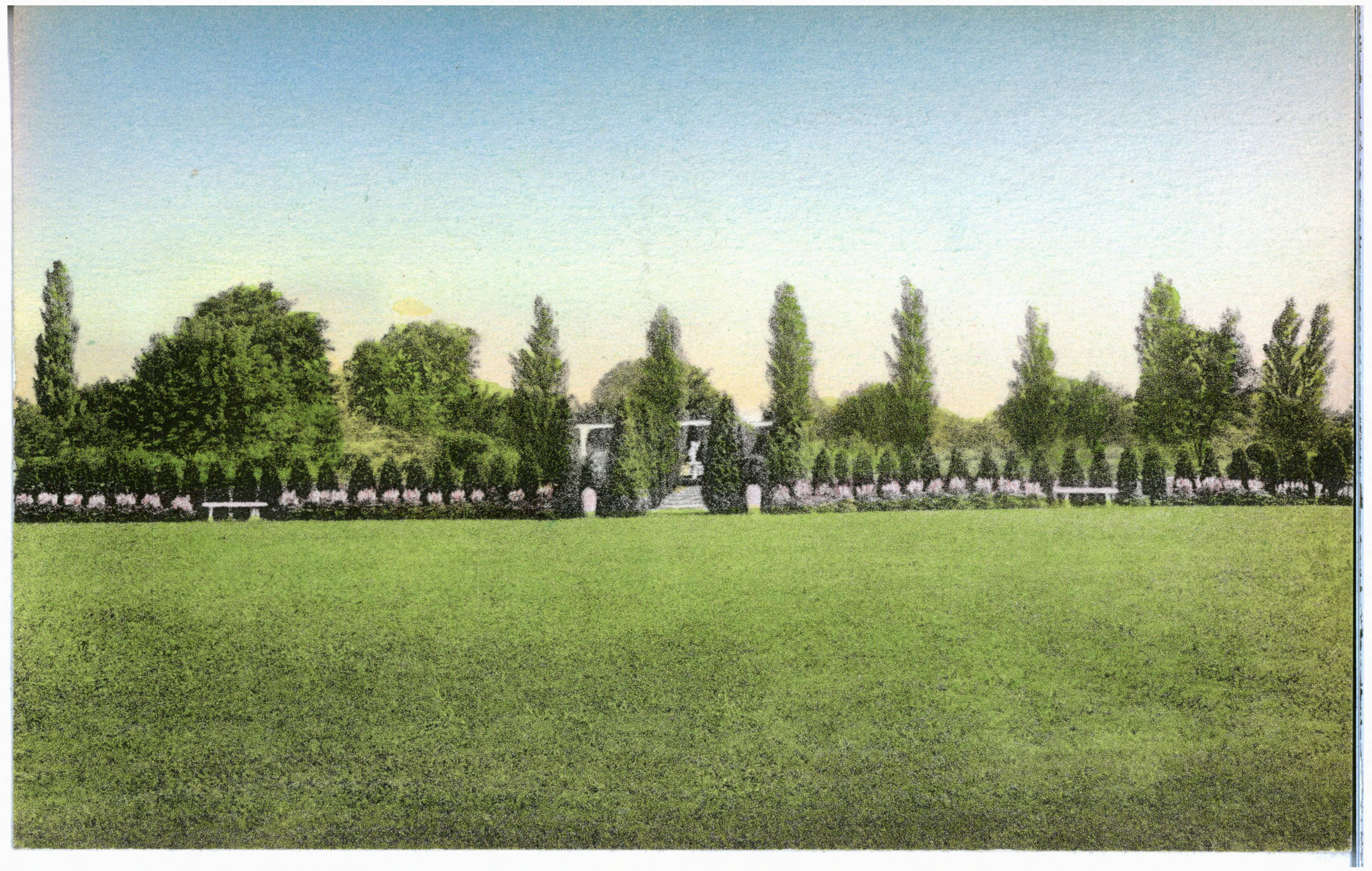
Flower garden

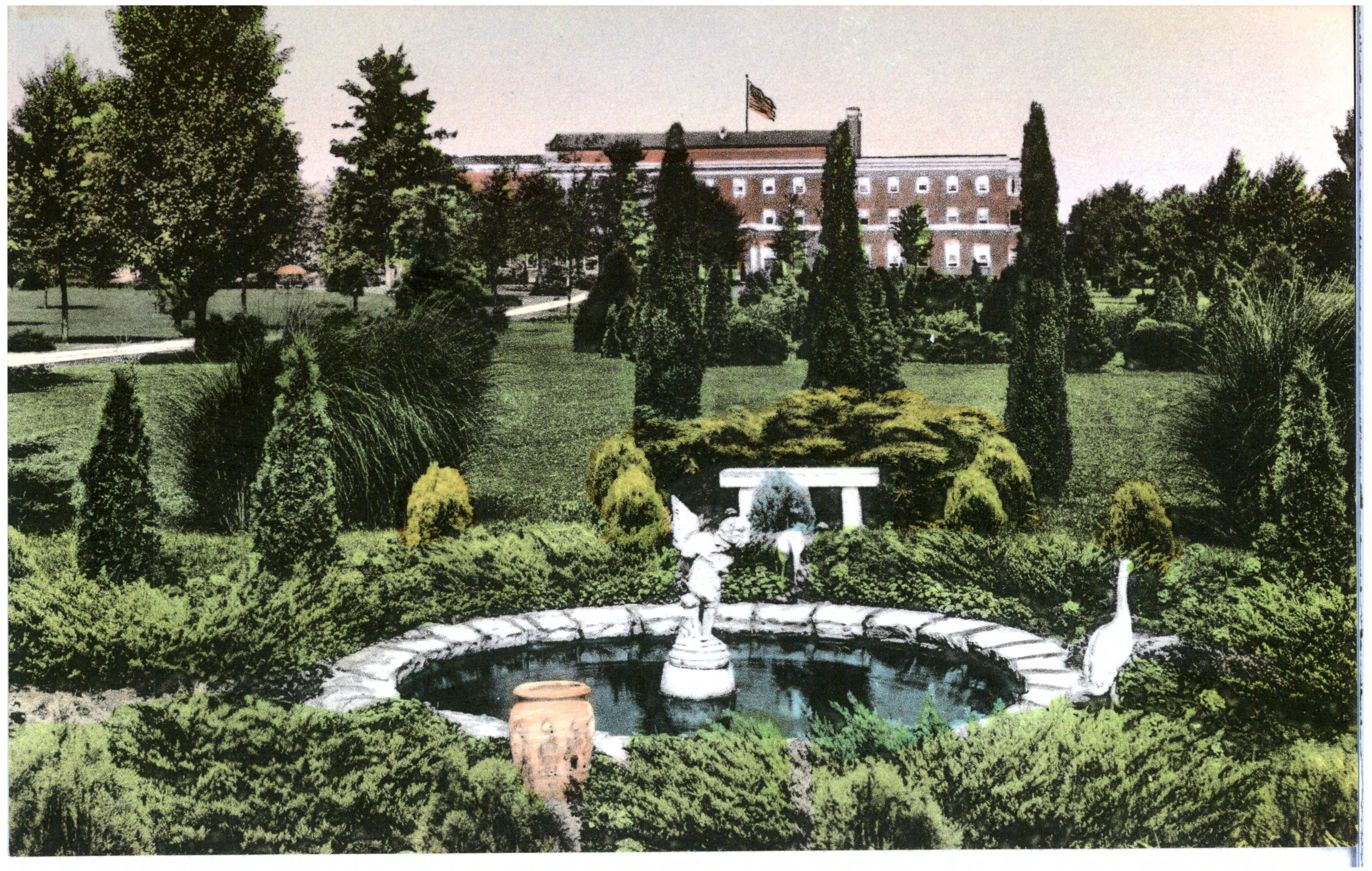
Formal pool

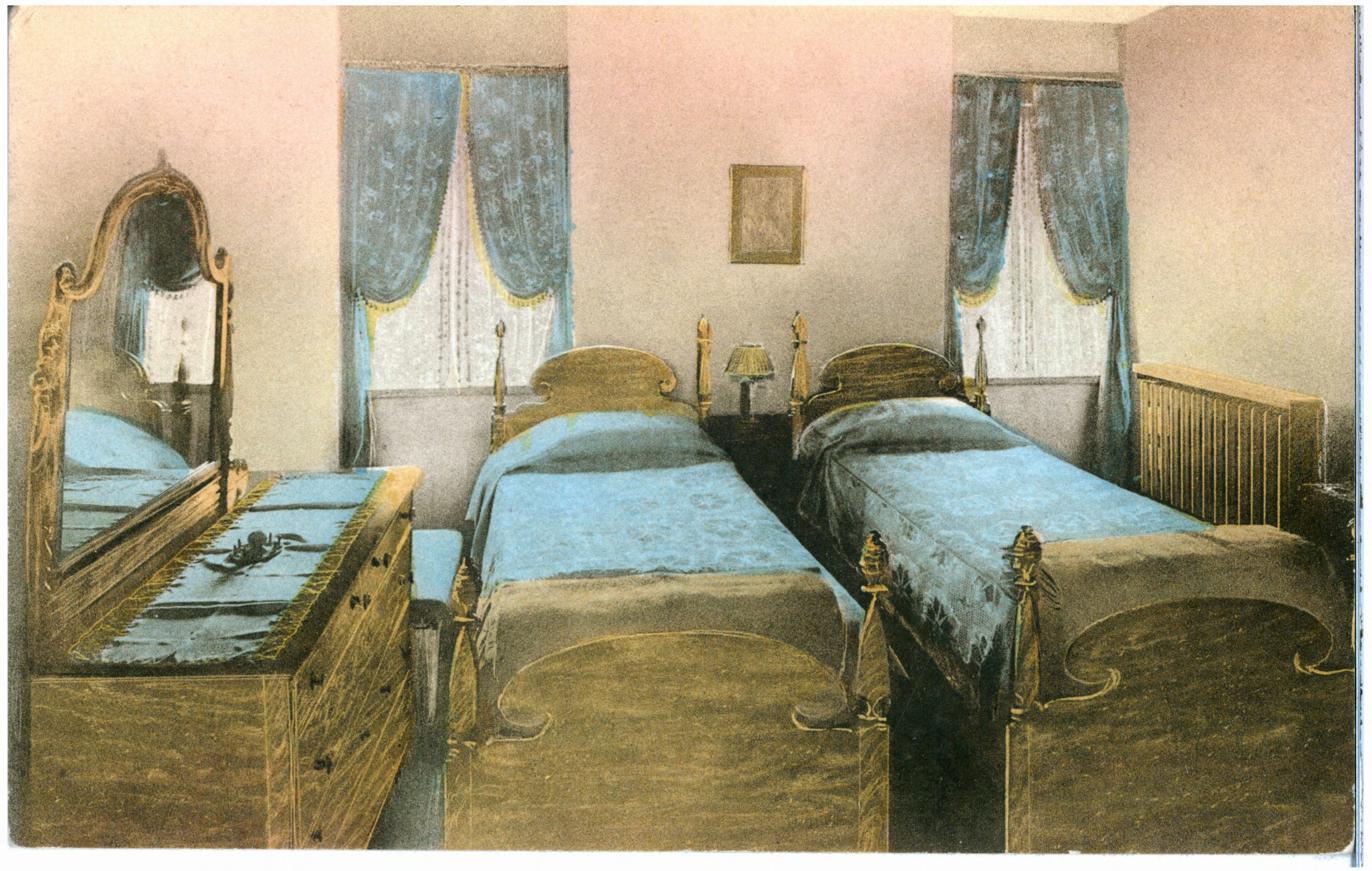
Guest room

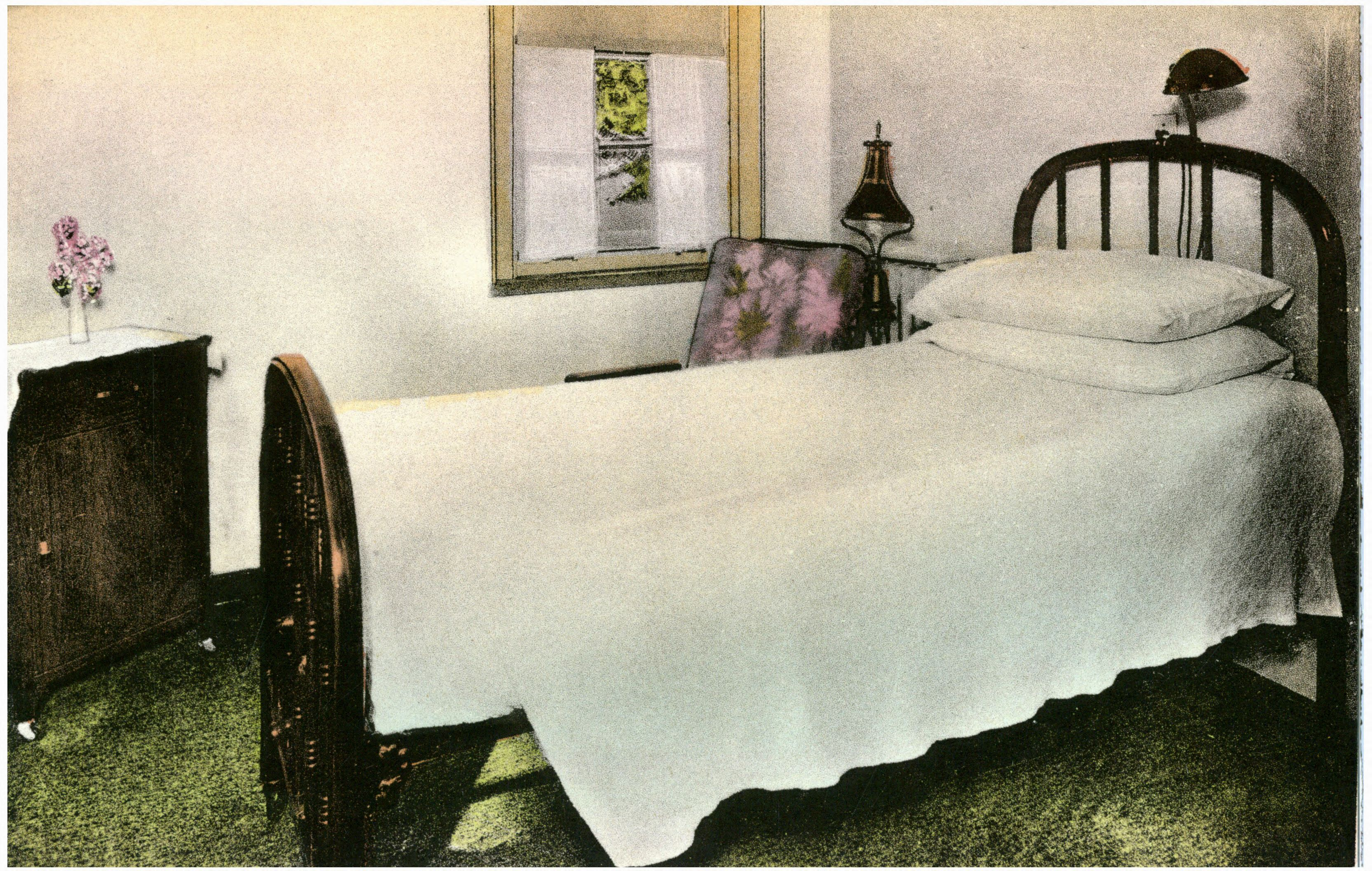
Hospital room

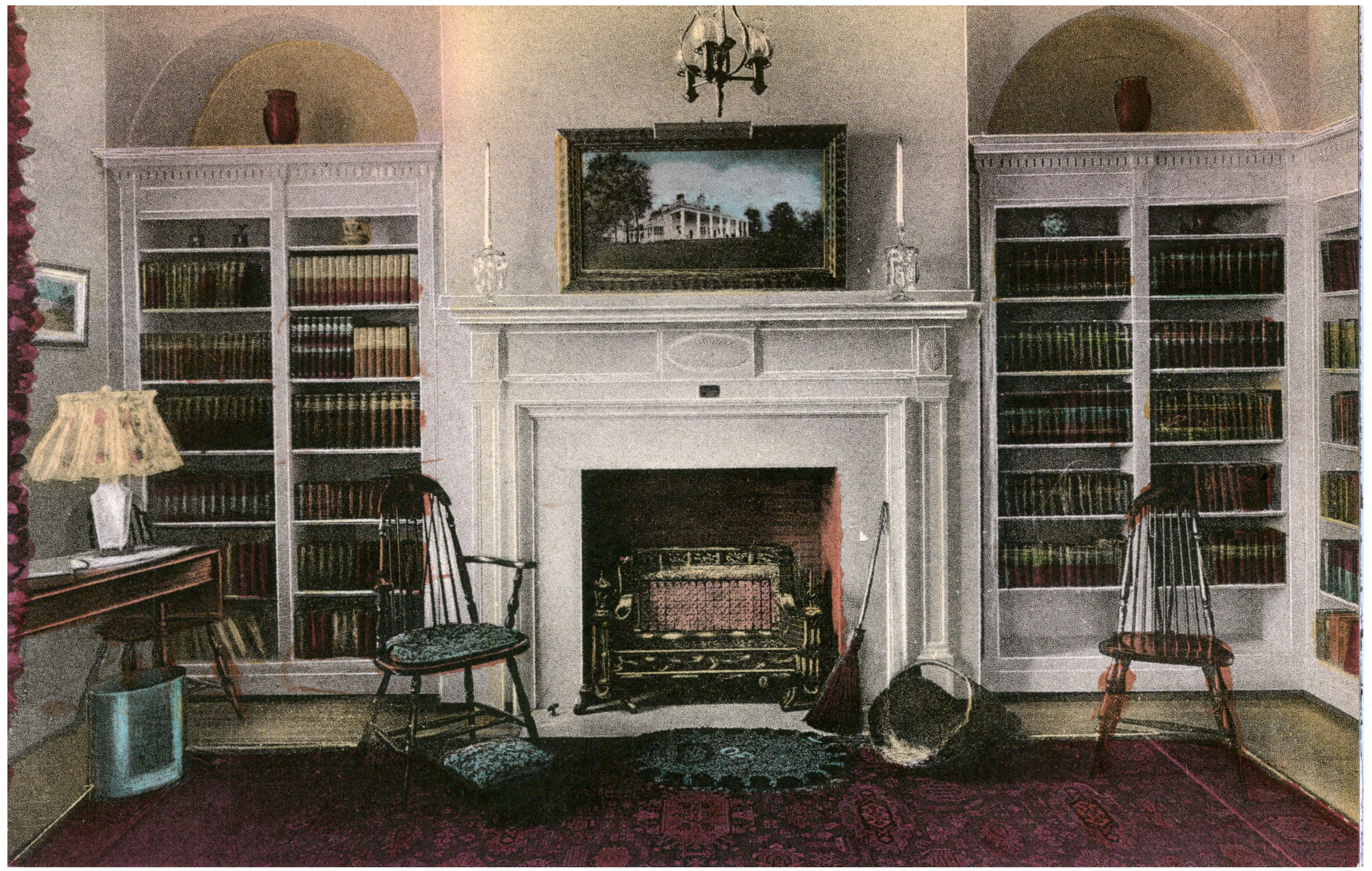
Library

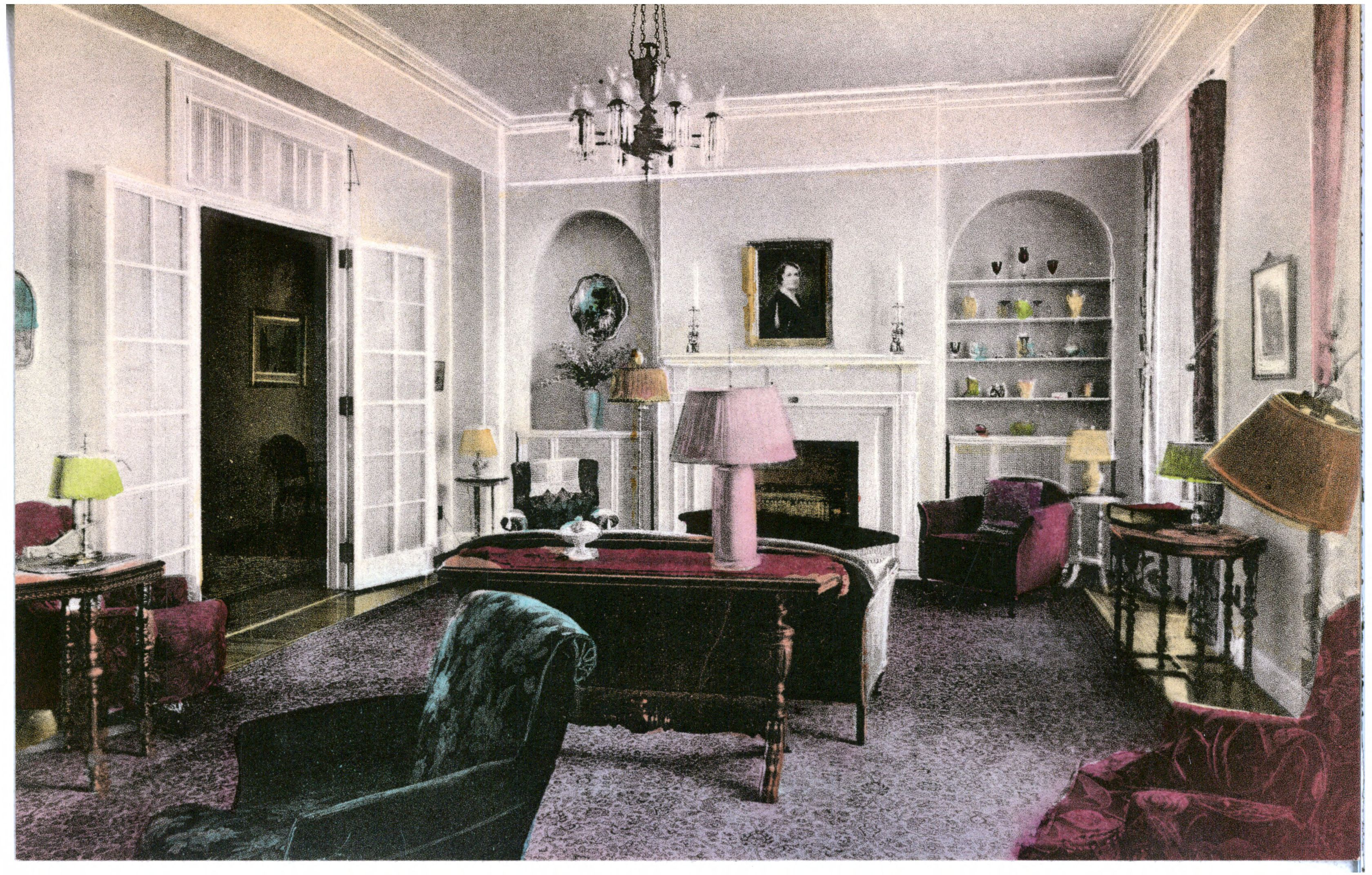
Living room

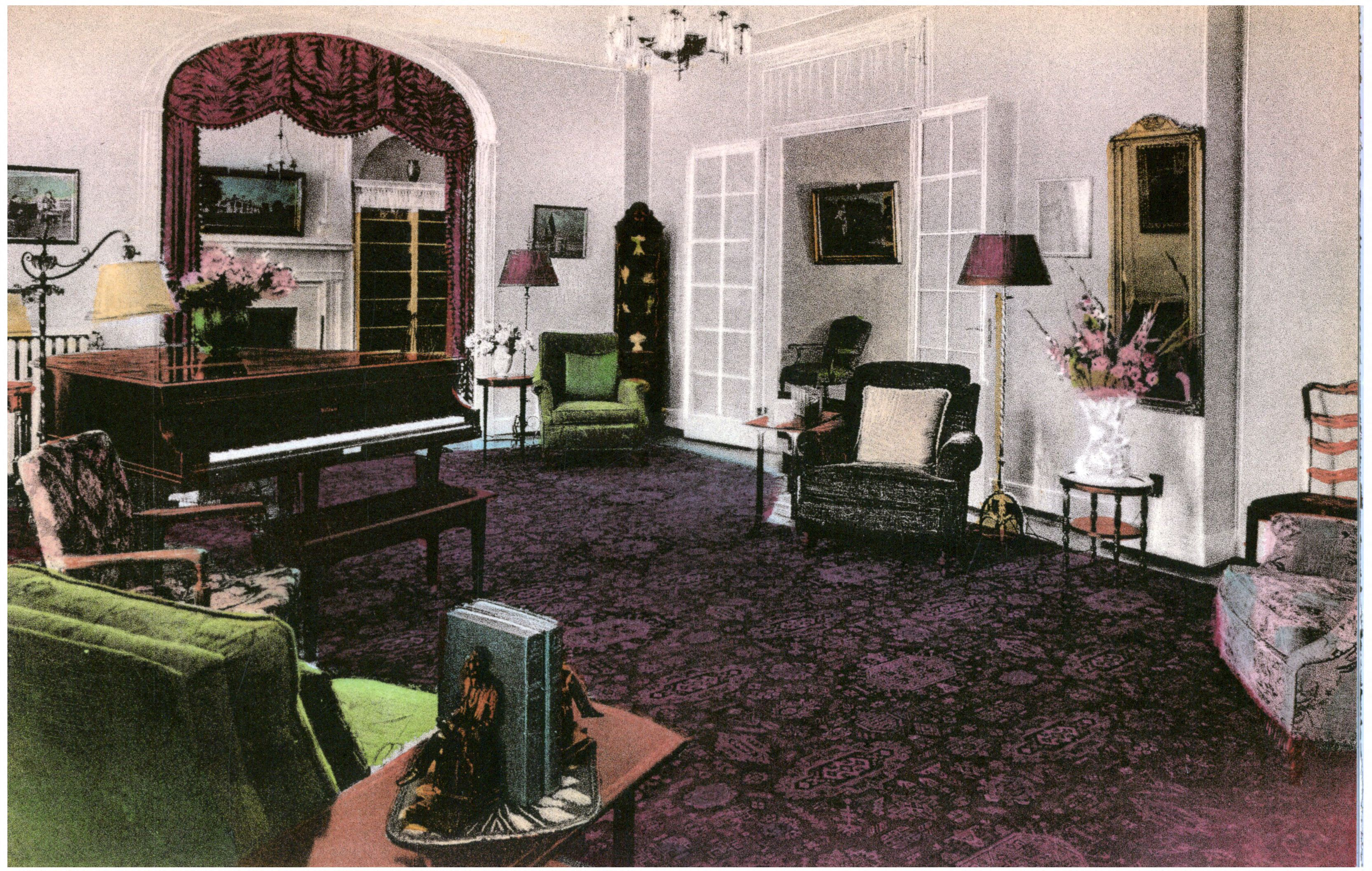
Lounge

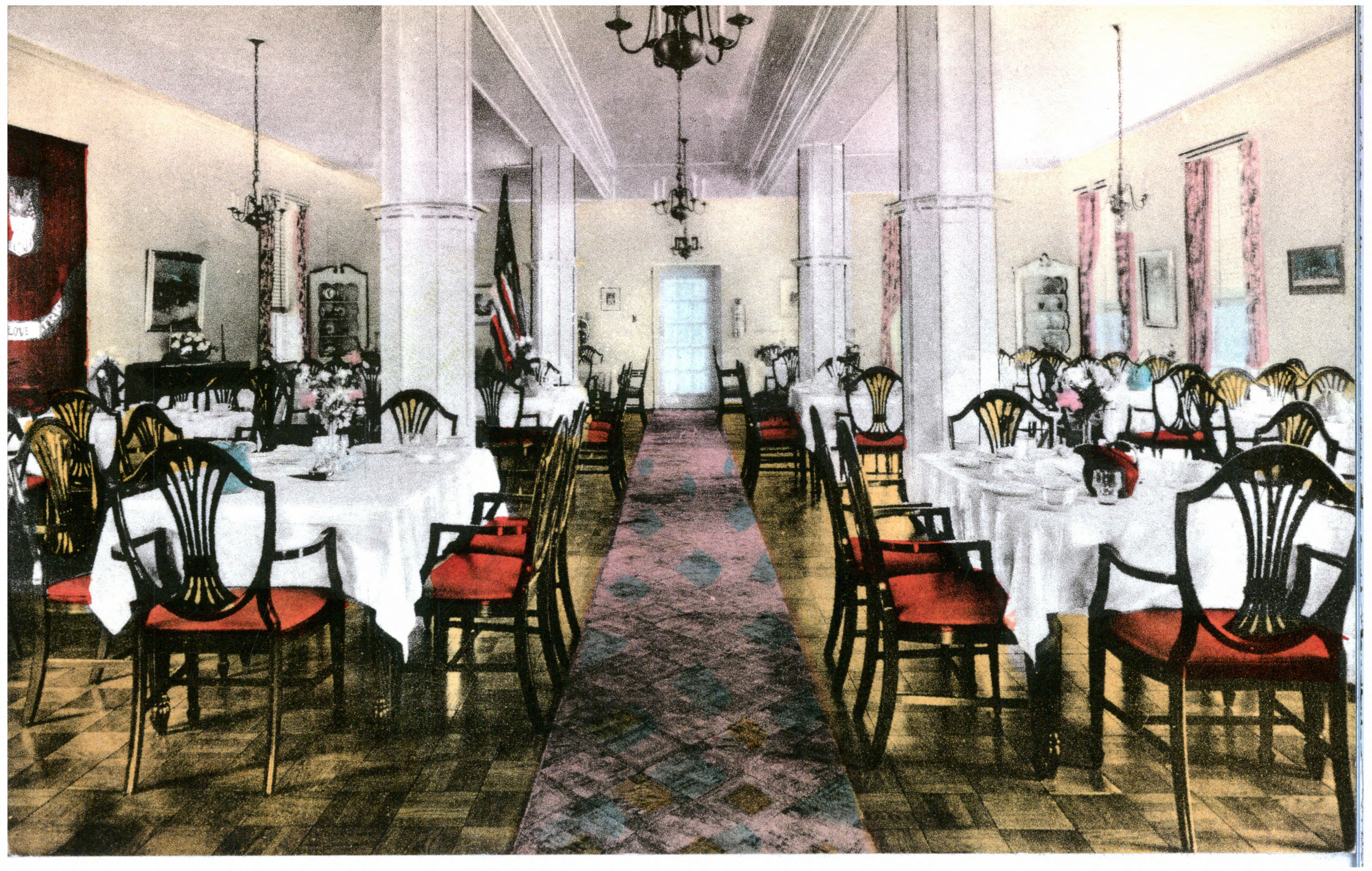
Main dining room (middle)

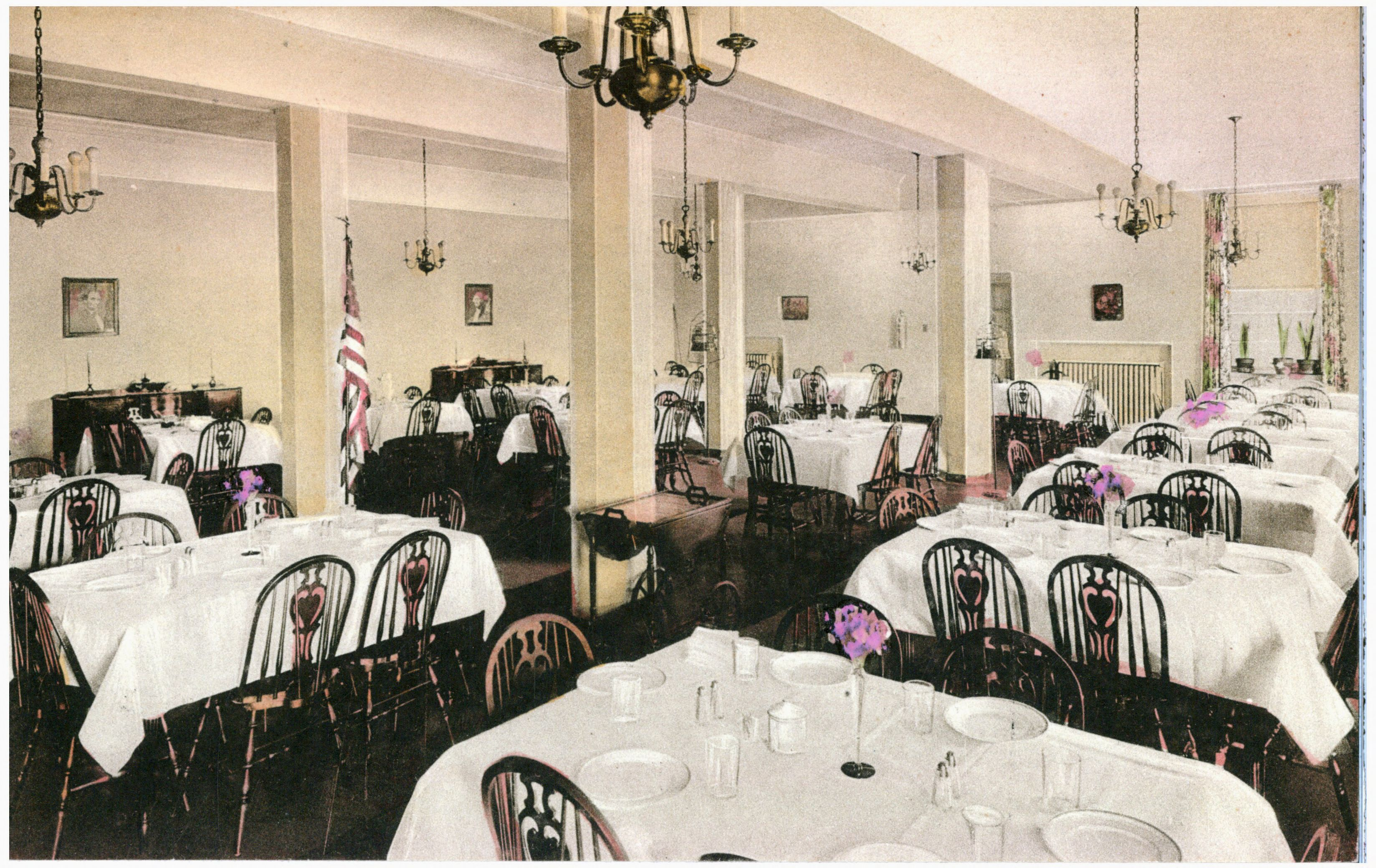
Main dining room (side)

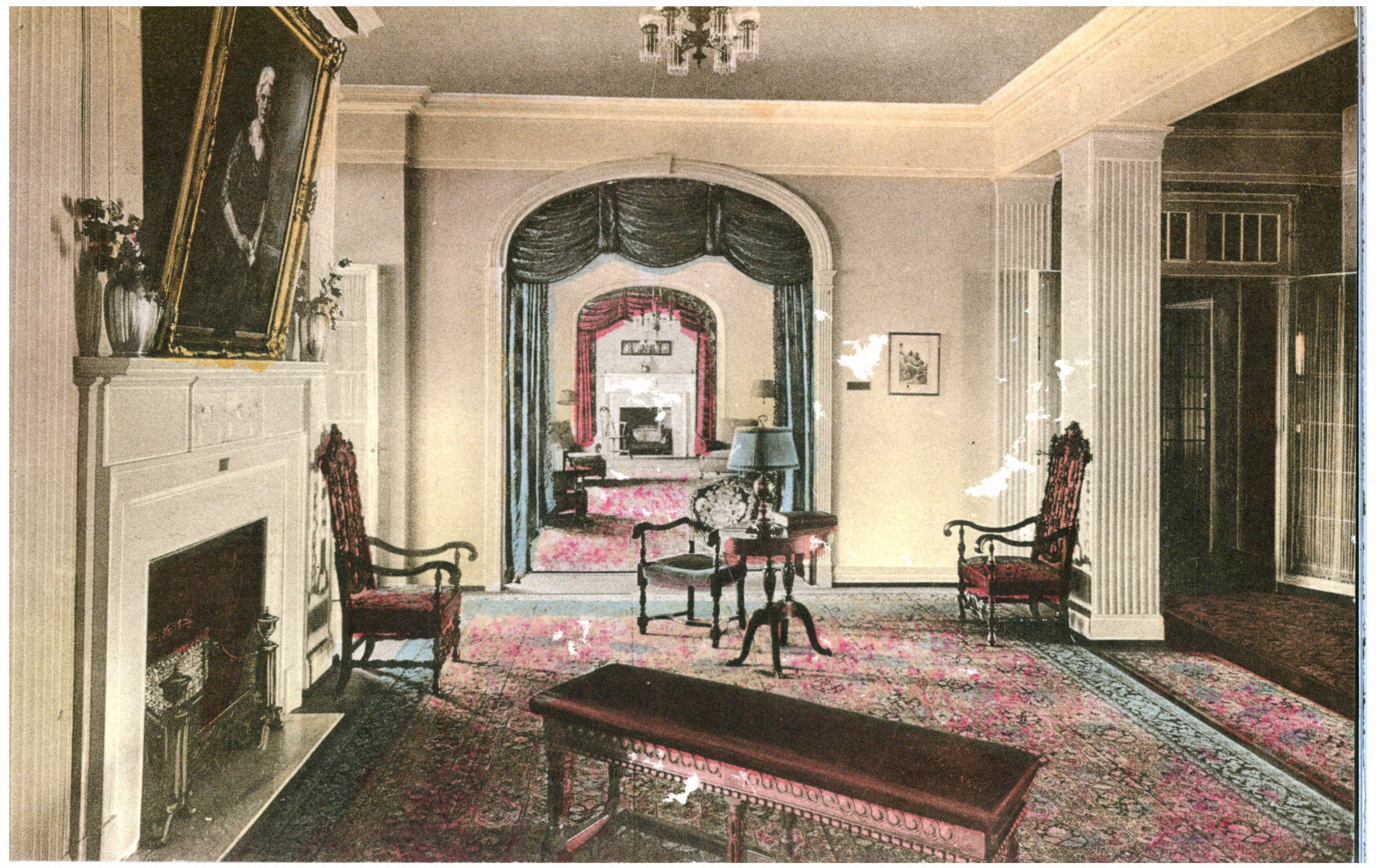
Reception room

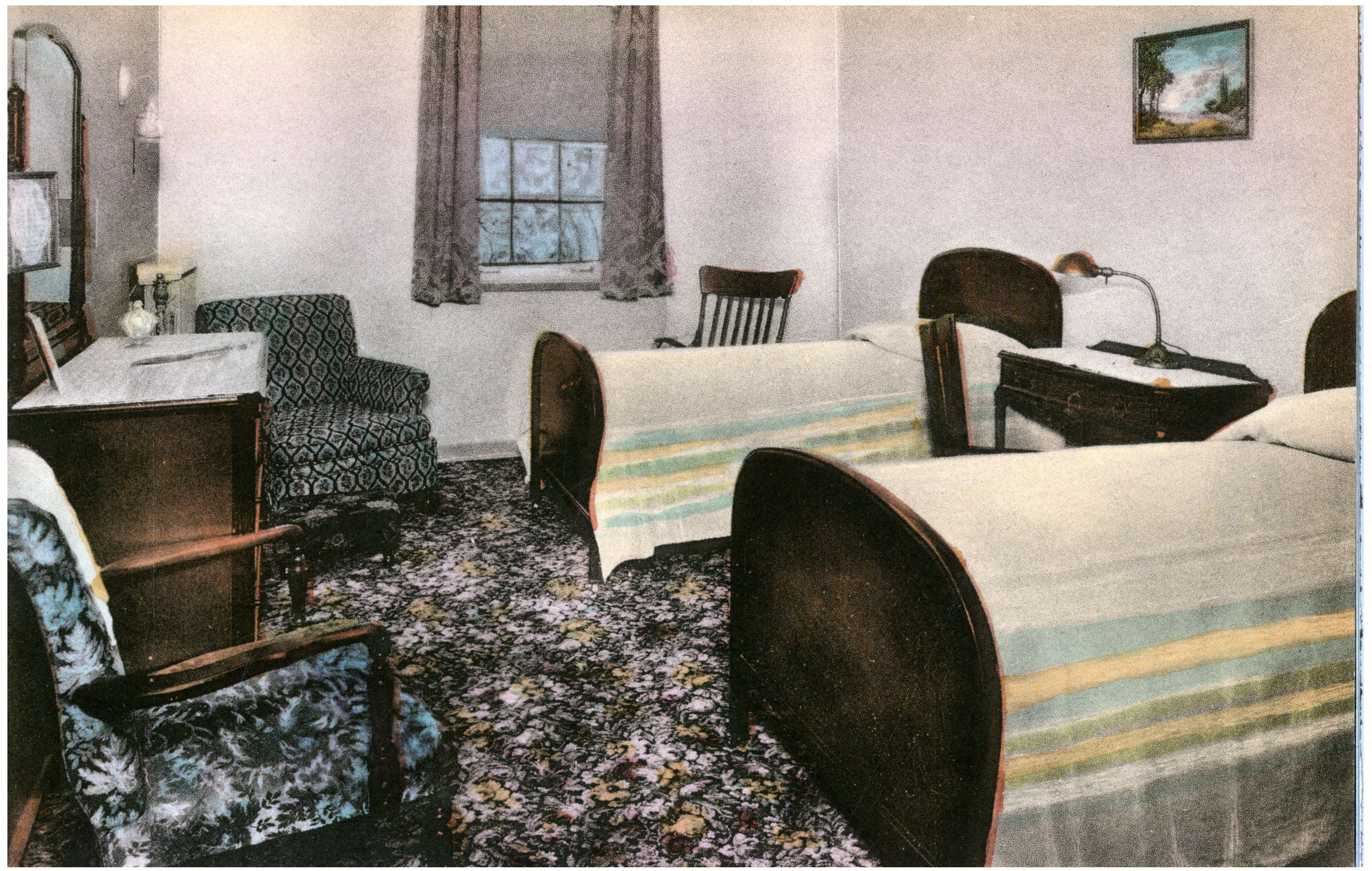
Resident's room

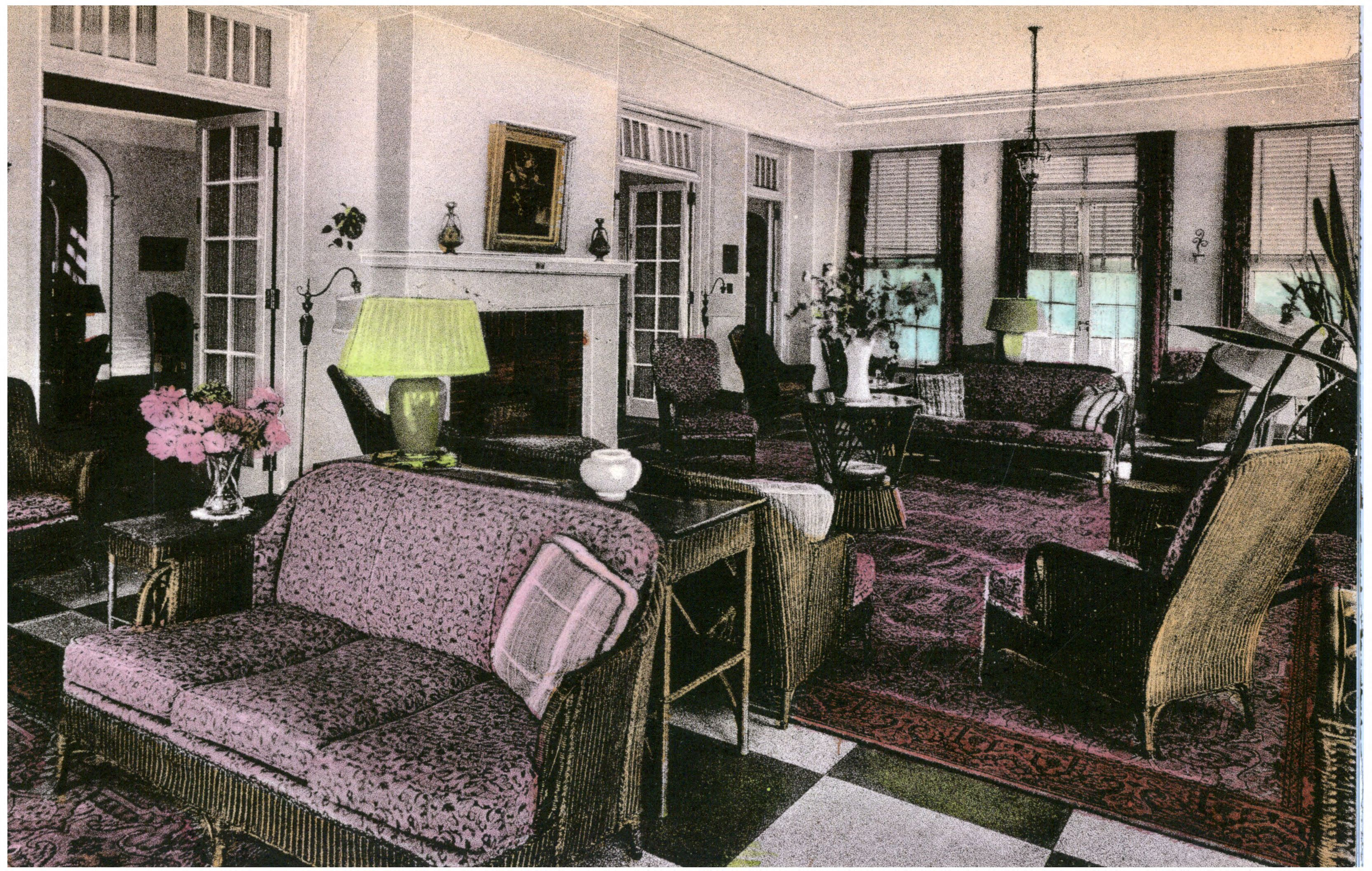
Sun parlor

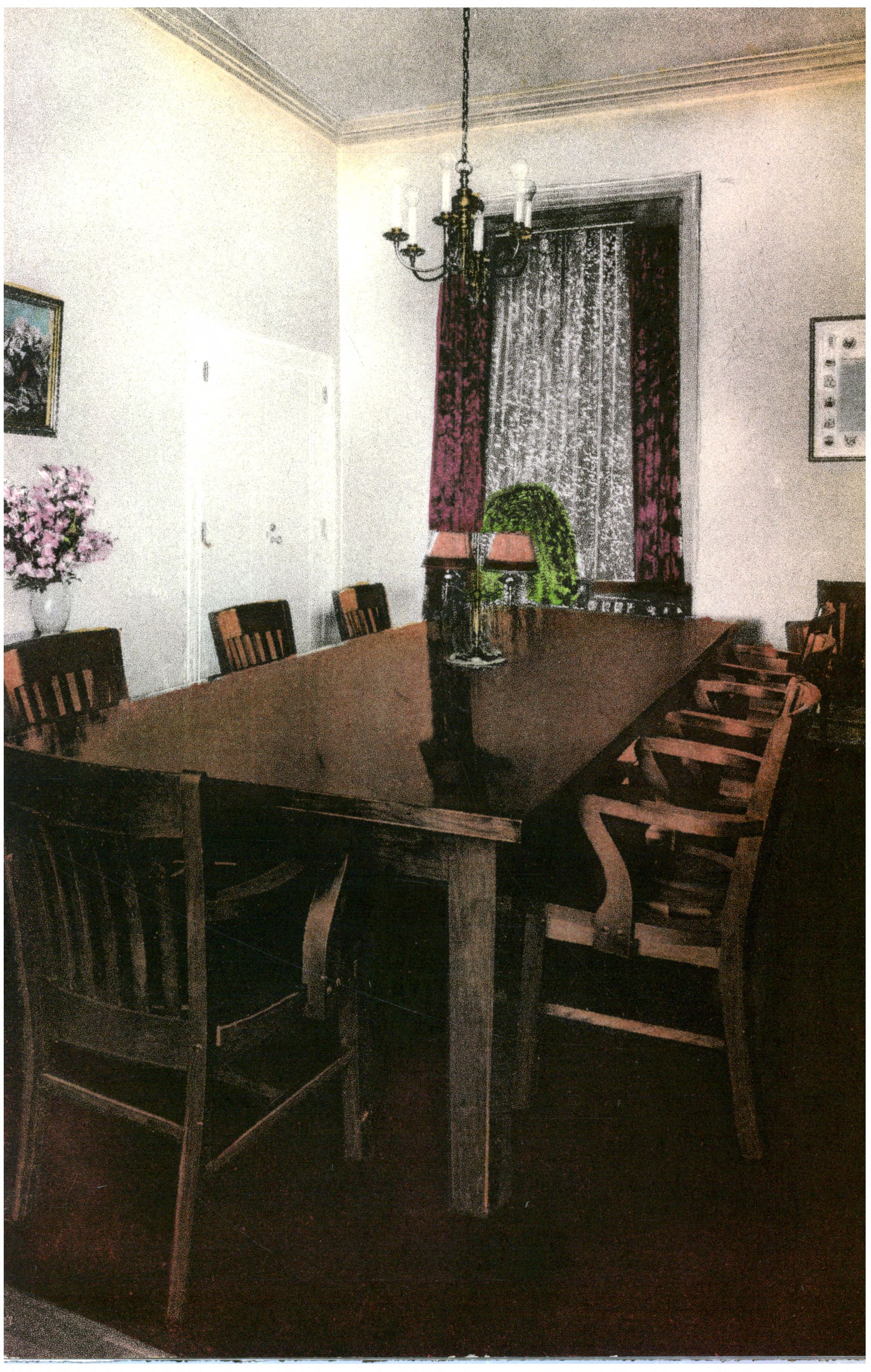
Board room

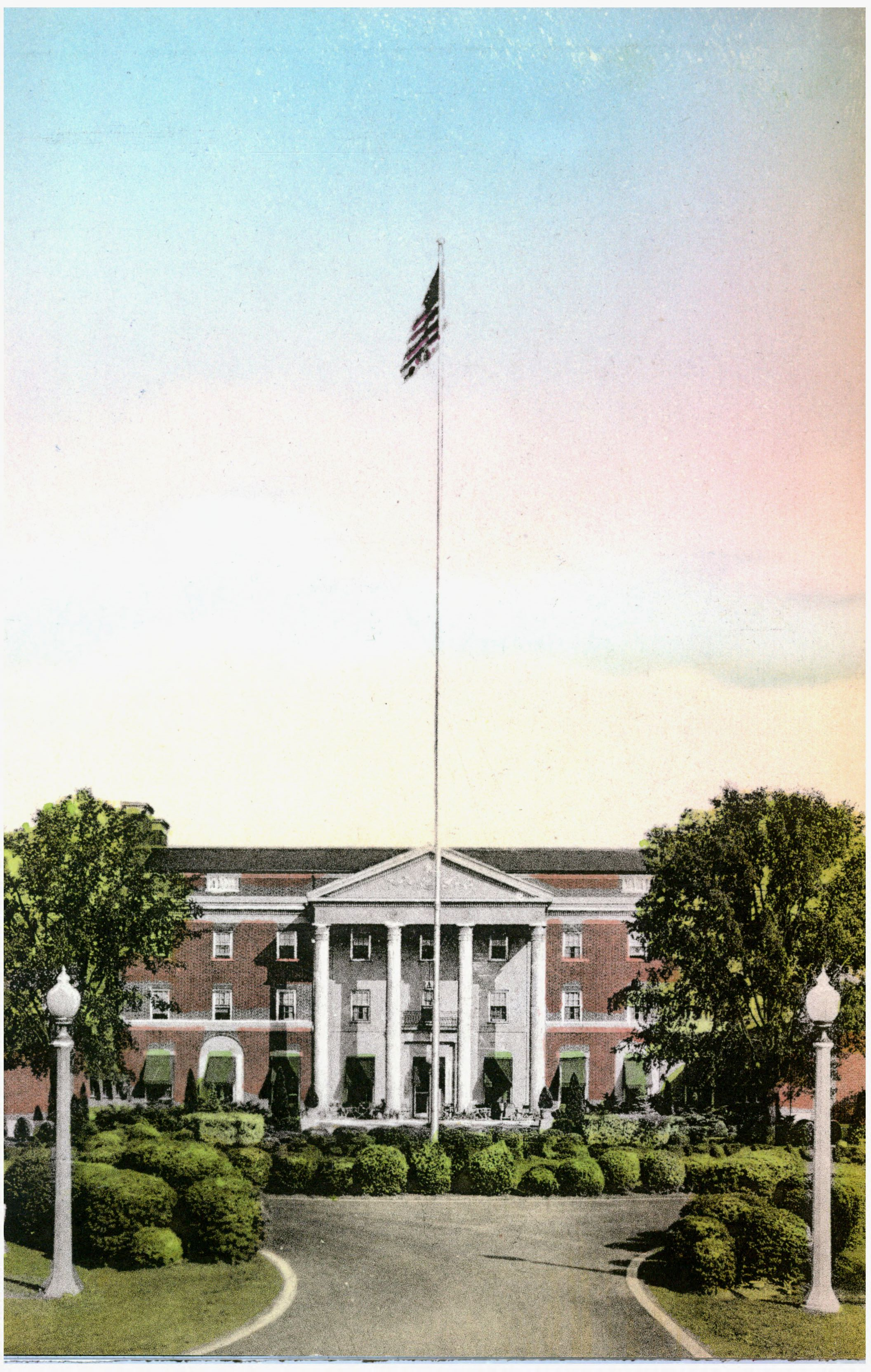
Flagpole

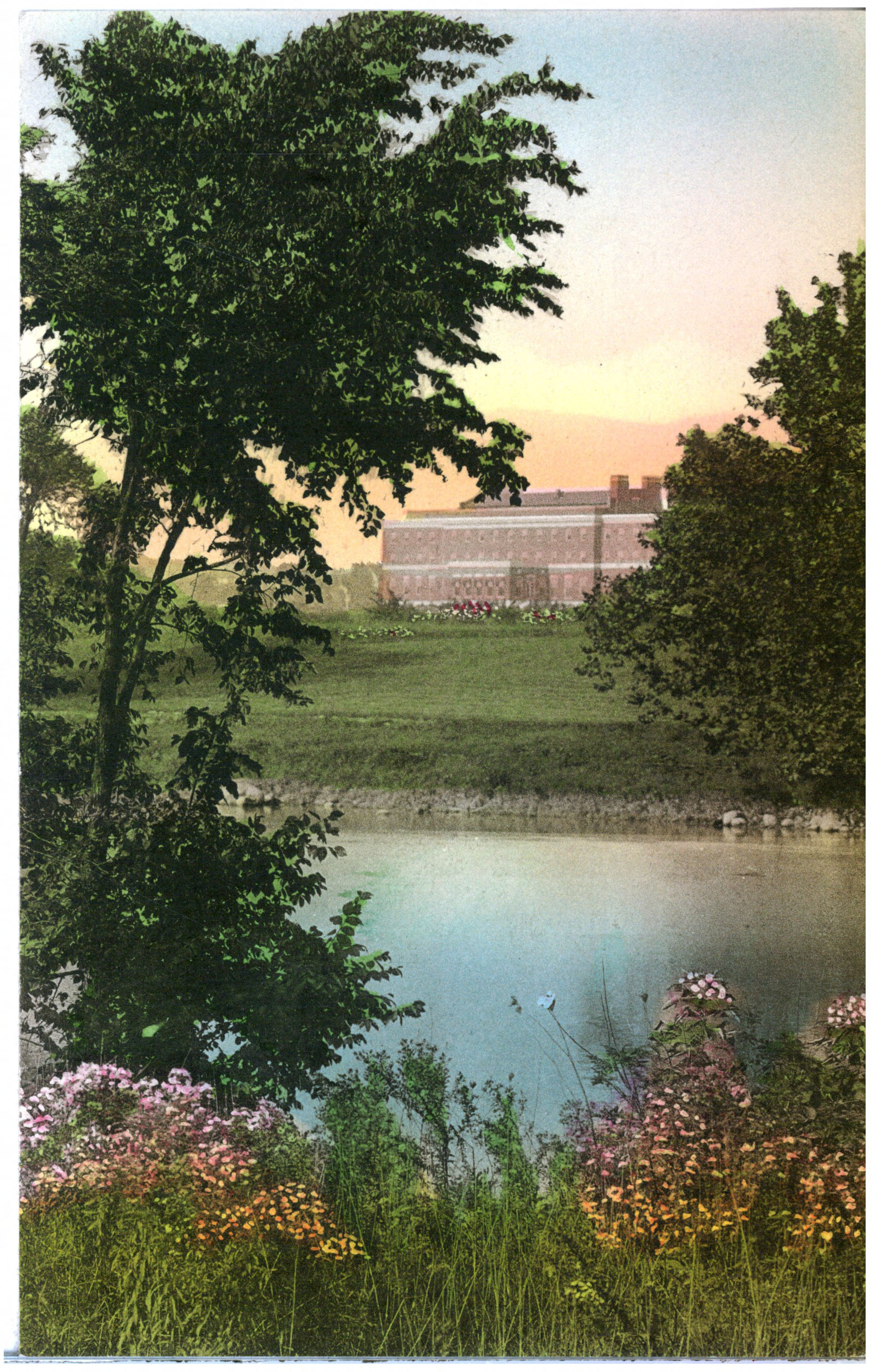
Rear side along river

== See also ==
- Sycamore House: historic building converted into senior housing by the Woda Group
- National Register of Historic Places listings in Seneca County, Ohio
