= Aigler Alumni Building =

- U.S. National Register of Historic Places
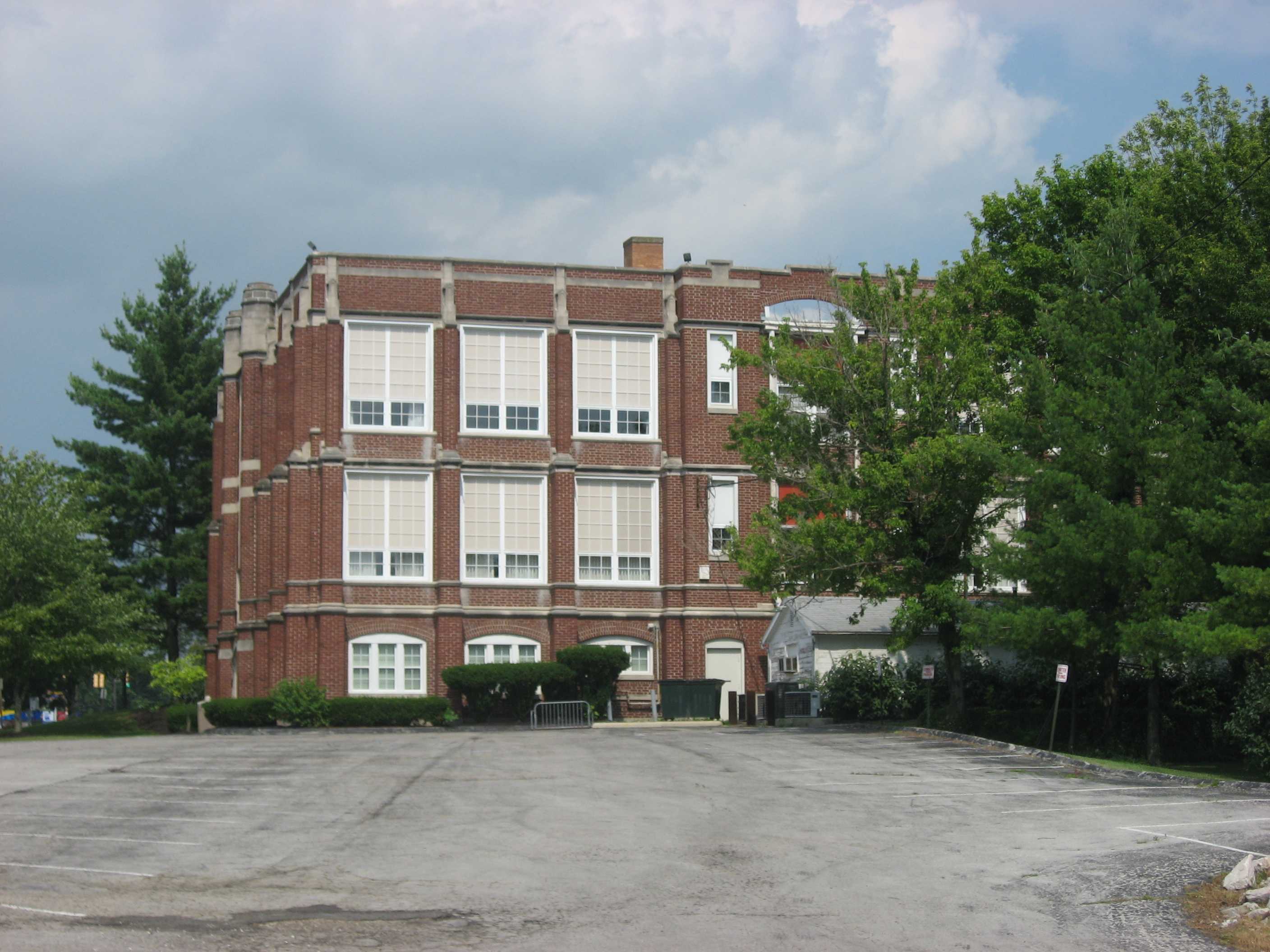
- Rear of the building in 2010

- Location within Ohio Location within the United States
- Location: 315 E Market St., Tiffin, Ohio
- Coordinates: 41°7′0.38″N 83°10′6.24″W
- Architectural style: American colonial
- MPS: Heidelberg College MRA (64000627)
- NRHP reference No.: 79002779
- Added to NRHP: 12 February 1979

Aigler Alumni Building, formerly the College Hill School, is a historic building in Tiffin, Ohio, that was listed in the National Register on February 12, 1979. It is one of ten buildings on the Heidelberg University campus listed on the National Register of Historic Places.

== History ==
The building is named for alumni Allan G. Aigler, Class of 1902, who was a trustee of the university from 1926 to 1960. The Aigler Alumni Building was purchased by Heidelberg University from the Tiffin City Board of Education in 1961, and was outfitted for use as a classroom, office, and laboratory building. It had previously functioned as an elementary school. In 2010 the Graduate Studies Office, psychology, criminal justice and political science moved into the building when the School of Business moved into the newly remodeled Adams Hall.

== See also ==
- Historic preservation
- History of education in the United States
- National Register of Historic Places in Seneca County, Ohio
