= 1966 NFL expansion draft =

Selection of players by the Atlanta Falcons

General information
- Sport: American football
- Date: February 15, 1966

Overview
- League: NFL
- Expansion teams: Atlanta Falcons
- Expansion season: 1966

The 1966 NFL expansion draft was a National Football League (NFL) draft in which a new expansion team, named the Atlanta Falcons, selected its first players. On June 30, 1965, NFL Commissioner Pete Rozelle awarded the first NFL franchise in the Deep South to the city of Atlanta and granted ownership to Rankin Smith Sr.

So that the Falcons could become competitive with existing teams, the league awarded the Falcons the first pick in the 1966 NFL draft, supplemented with the final pick in the first five rounds. The NFL also gave the new team the opportunity to select current players from existing teams. That selection was provided by the expansion draft, held on February 15, 1966. In this draft, held six weeks after the regular draft, the existing franchises listed players from which the Falcons could select to switch to the new team.

Each of the 14 established teams froze 29 players on their 40-man rosters that opened the 1965 season (That made 154 players available.). Atlanta picked one of the 11 and then each team froze two more. Atlanta was able to select two more for a total of 42 players chosen. The Falcons paid $8.5 million for the franchise. (February 17, 1966 St. Petersburg Times.)

== Player selections ==
| Player | Position | College team | Original NFL team |
|---|---|---|---|
| Roger Anderson | DT | Virginia Union | New York Giants |
| Larry Benz | S | Northwestern | Cleveland Browns |
| Lee Calland | DB | Louisville | Minnesota Vikings |
| Dennis Claridge | QB | Nebraska | Green Bay Packers |
| Junior Coffey | FB | Washington | Green Bay Packers |
| Ed Cook | OG | Notre Dame | St. Louis Cardinals |
| Dave Crossan | C | Maryland | Washington Redskins |
| Perry Lee Dunn | RB | Mississippi | Dallas Cowboys |
| Bobby Franklin | S | Mississippi | Cleveland Browns |
| Dan Grimm | OG | Colorado | Green Bay Packers |
| Alex Hawkins | WR | South Carolina | Baltimore Colts |
| Ralph Heck | LB | Colorado | Philadelphia Eagles |
| Bob Jencks | TE- PK | Miami (OH) | Washington Redskins |
| Bill Jobko | LB | Ohio State | Minnesota Vikings |
| Rudy Johnson | HB | Nebraska | San Francisco 49ers |
| Frank Lasky | OT | Florida | New York Giants |
| Danny Lewis | FB | Wisconsin | Washington Redskins |
| Errol Linden | OT | Houston | Minnesota Vikings |
| Bill (Red) Mack | TE-WR | Notre Dame | Pittsburgh Steelers |
| Frank Marchlewski | C | Minnesota | Los Angeles Rams |
| Billy Martin | TE | Georgia Tech | Chicago Bears |
| Dale Memmelaar | OG | Wyoming | Cleveland Browns |
| Dale Messer | FL | Fresno State | San Francisco 49ers |
| Max Messner | LB | Cincinnati | Pittsburgh Steelers |
| Dennis Murphy | DT | Florida | Chicago Bears |
| Neal Petties | SE | San Diego State | Baltimore Colts |
| Tim Powell | DE | Northwestern | Los Angeles Rams |
| Dave Recher | C | Iowa | Philadelphia Eagles |
| Guy Reese | OT | SMU | Baltimore Colts |
| Bob Richards | DE | LSU | Philadelphia Eagles |
| Jerry Richardson | DB | West Texas State | Los Angeles Rams |
| Marion Rushing | LB | Southern Illinois | St. Louis Cardinals |
| Bob Sherman | DB | Iowa | Pittsburgh Steelers |
| Chuck Sieminski | DT | Penn State | San Francisco 49ers |
| Carl Silvestri | DB | Wisconsin | St. Louis Cardinals |
| Jim Simon | OG-T | Miami | Detroit Lions |
| Ron Smith | DB | Wisconsin | Chicago Bears |
| Don Talbert | OT | Texas | Dallas Cowboys |
| Ernie Wheelwright | FB | Southern Illinois | New York Giants |
| Bob Whitlow | C | Arizona | Detroit Lions |
| Sam Williams | DE | Michigan State | Detroit Lions |
| Maury Youmans | DE | Syracuse | Dallas Cowboys |

== See also ==
- Pro Football Hall of Fame – 1966 Draft
- Dbasefootball – 1966 Draft
- 1966 American Football League draft
