= Edward Young Clarke =

American businessman and KKK official

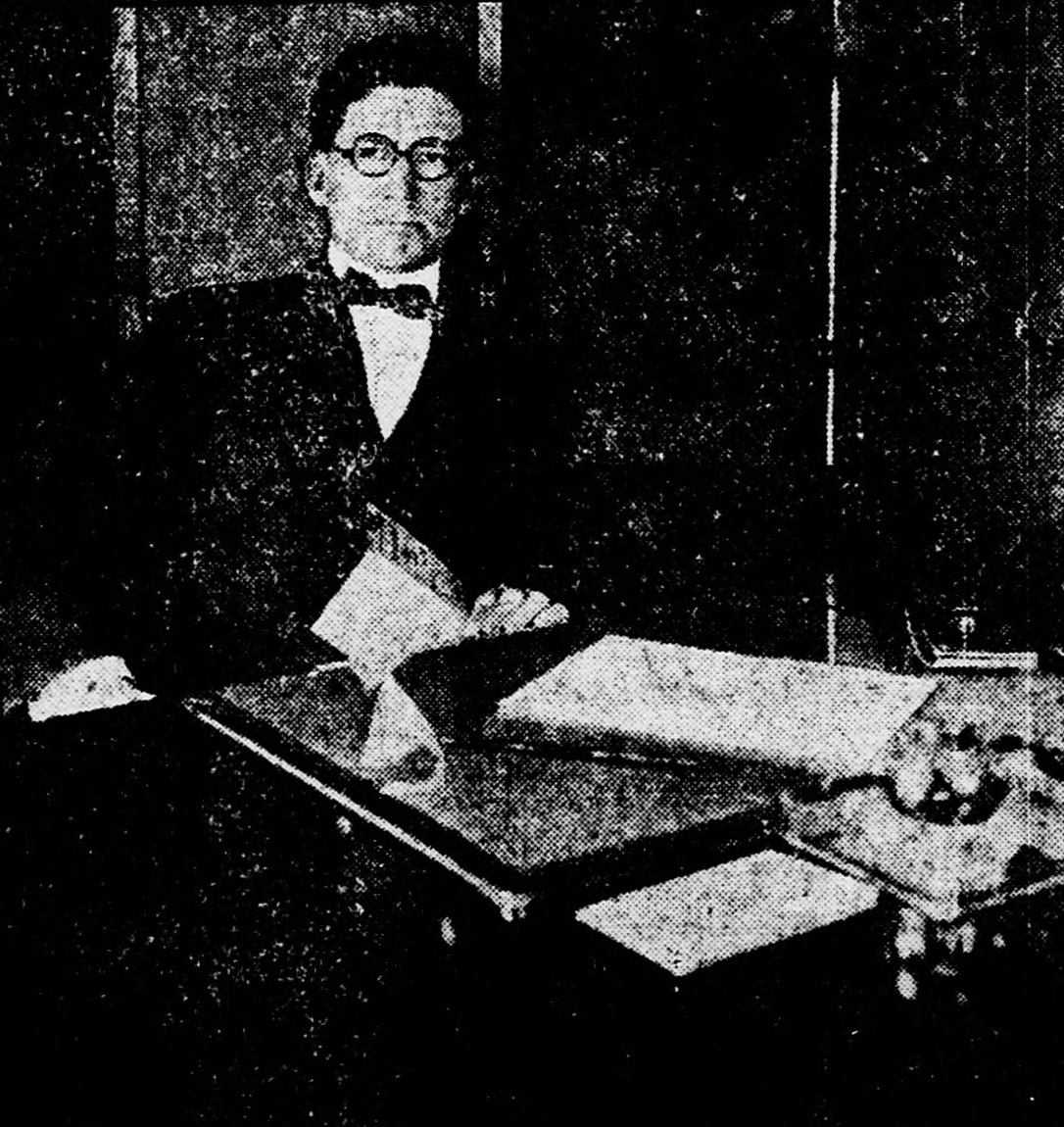
- In his office, 1922
- Born: 1877; Georgia
- Died: Unknown
- Parent: E. Y. Clarke Sr.

Edward Young Clarke was the Imperial Wizard pro tempore of the Ku Klux Klan from 1915 to 1922. Prior to his Klan activities, Clarke headed the Atlanta-based Southern Publicity Association. He later served as the president of Monarch Publishing, a book publishing company.

== Biography ==
=== Early life ===
Edward Young Clarke was born in Georgia according to census records. He grew up in Atlanta, Georgia, as his mother, Elnora Harrison Clarke, and his father, Colonel Edward Y. Clarke Sr. were both longtime citizens of the city. His father was the owner of The Atlanta Constitution newspaper from 1870 to 1876, whose managing editor was his brother, Francis Clarke.

=== KKK Activities ===
In the early 20th century, Clarke joined the Ku Klux Klan, which had been reborn in Atlanta. He then served as the Imperial Wizard pro tempore of the Ku Klux Klan from 1915 to 1922. He devised the "kluxing" system of payments to the hierarchy within the Klan. Along with Elizabeth Tyler, he helped to turn the initially anemic second Ku Klux Klan into a mass-membership organization with a broader social agenda.

In March 1924, he pleaded guilty to violating the Mann Act, after being arrested for a violent attack against a young woman who worked for him. Clarke was spared prison, but fined $5,000. In 1940, he was arrested in Chicago for failing to pay a $600 hotel bill, cashing a $76 worthless check, and the failing to repay $600 he borrowed from a Chicago woman.

=== Book publisher ===
He was the President of Monarch Publishing, a book publishing company. In 1939, he published the novel The Flaming Sword by Thomas Dixon Jr.
