= Omar Chapel =

- U.S. National Register of Historic Places
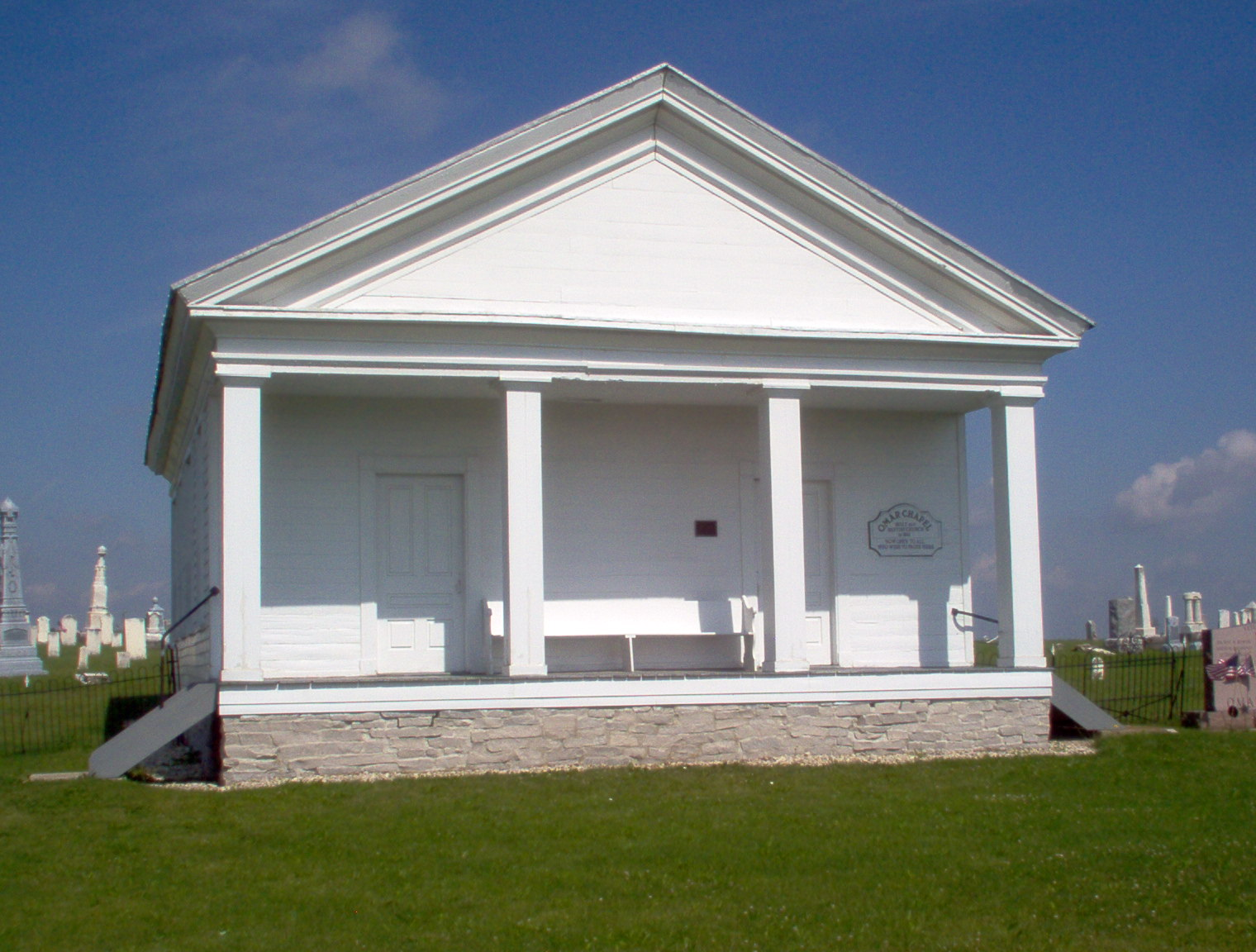
- East facade

- Location within Ohio Location within the United States
- Nearest city: Attica, Ohio
- Coordinates: 41°7′6″N 82°51′46″W
- Area: 1 acre (0.40 ha)
- Built: 1843
- Architectural style: Greek Revival
- NRHP reference No.: 87001982
- Added to NRHP: November 5, 1987

Omar Chapel is a historic church building in Reed Township, Seneca County, Ohio, United States. It was completed in 1843 in the Greek Revival style and was once known as the Second Regular Baptist Church of Reed Township.

The chapel has been designated an Ohio Underground Railroad Historic Site for its role in the abolitionist movement. It was listed on the National Register of Historic Places in 1987.

A 1953 tornado damaged the chapel's roof. The property has since been restored and maintained by volunteers.

== See also ==
- List of Underground Railroad sites
