= Black Student Union Center =

- U.S. National Register of Historic Places
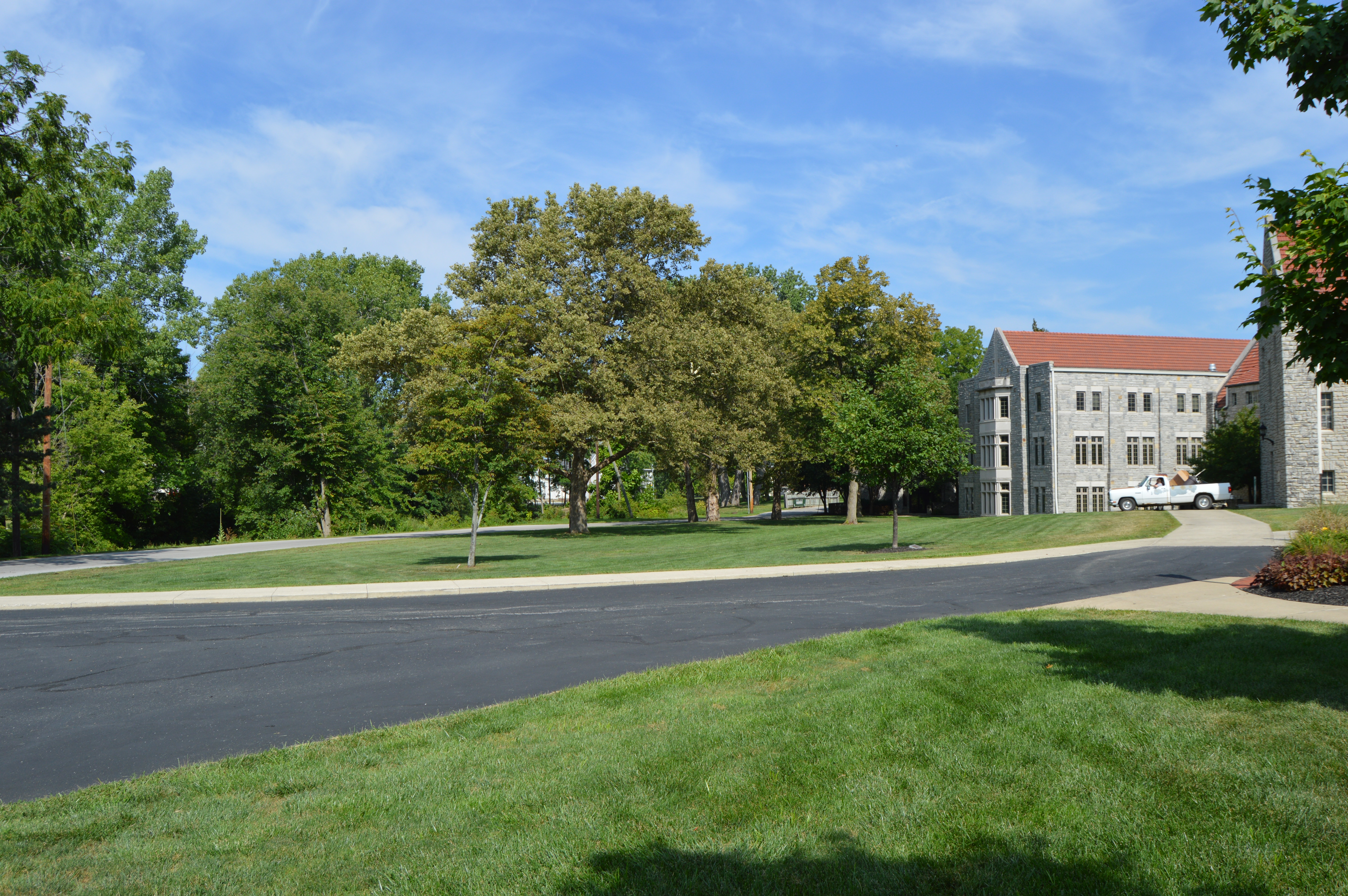
- A lawn on the campus of Heidelberg University in Tiffin, Ohio, United States. This lawn was formerly occupied by a small building known as the Black Student Union Center; although it was destroyed after it was listed on the National Register of Historic Places, it has not yet been delisted.

- Location within Ohio
- Location: 120 Hedges St., Tiffin, Ohio
- Coordinates: 41°06′50″N 83°10′04″W
- Area: less than one acre
- Built: 1920
- Architectural style: Bungalow
- MPS: Heidelberg College MRA
- NRHP reference No.: 79002780
- Added to NRHP: February 12, 1979

The Black Student Union Center of Heidelberg College in Tiffin, Ohio, located at 120 Hedges St., was built in 1920. It was listed on the National Register of Historic Places in 1979.

At the time of writing of the Heidelberg College Multiple Resources Assessment, the union was not considered to be NRHP-eligible.
