= Old Durand High School =

- Durand High School
- U.S. National Register of Historic Places
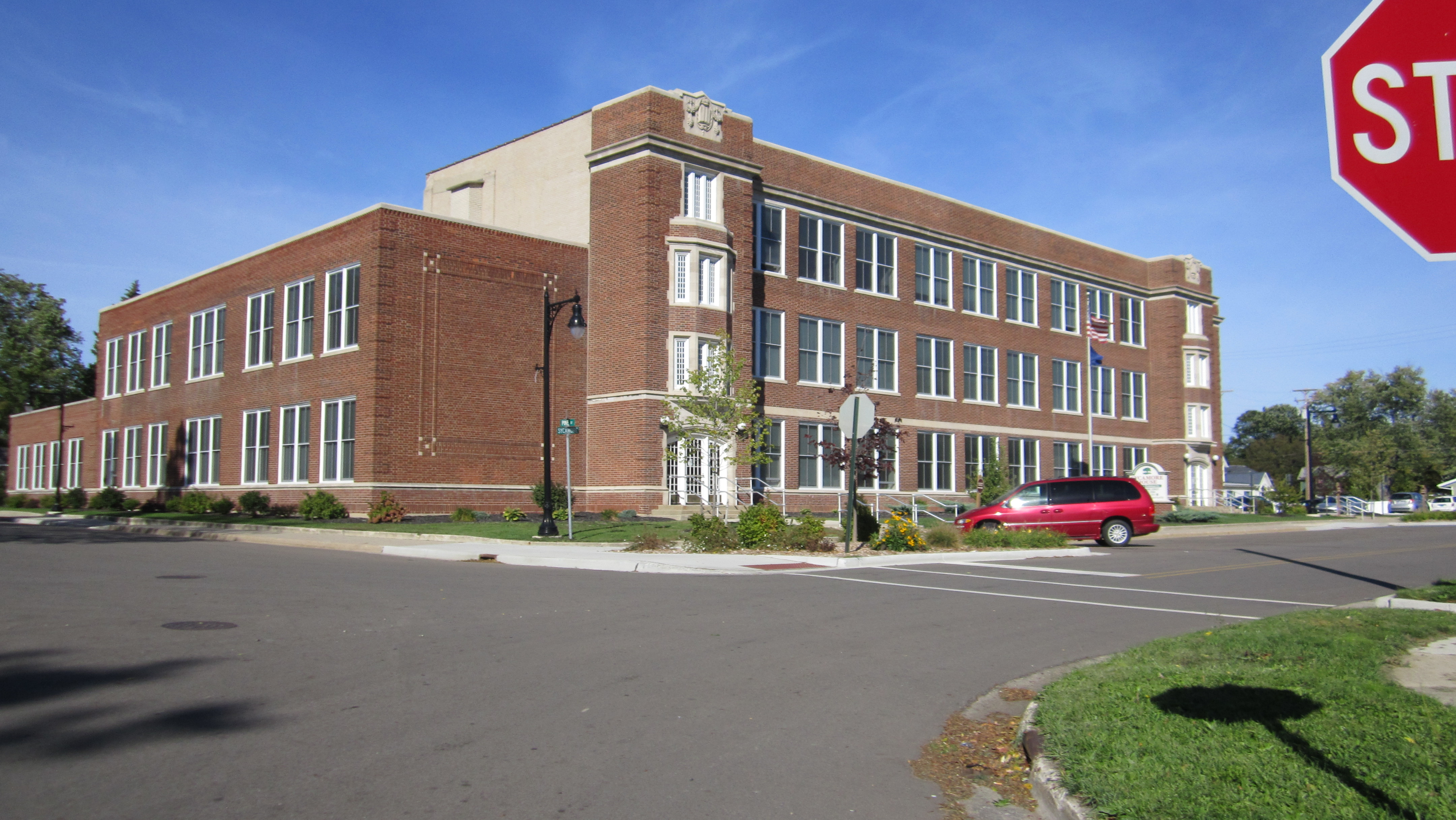

- Location within Michigan Location within the United States
- Interactive map
- Location: 100 W. Sycamore St., Durand, Michigan
- Coordinates: 42°54′56″N 83°59′12″W
- Area: 1.4 acres (0.57 ha)
- Built: 1920
- Architect: Van Leyen, Schilling & Keough
- Architectural style: Tudor Revival
- NRHP reference No.: 09000130
- Added to NRHP: March 17, 2009

The old Durand High School is a former school building located at 100 West Sycamore Street in Durand, Michigan. It was listed on the National Register of Historic Places in 2009. It has been refurbished into senior living apartments, known as the Sycamore House.

== History ==
Durand was first platted in 1876, at the juncture of the Chicago & Northeastern and the Detroit, Grand Haven & Milwaukee railway lines. In 1890, a four-room brick school building housing all grades was constructed on Sycamore Street where the former high school now stands. This building was expanded in 1909, and in 1912 a second school was constructed on the south side for grades one through six, leaving the original school to house the upper grades. However, in 1920, the 1890 school was destroyed by fire. After the fire, the school board hired the Detroit firm of Van Leyen, Schilling & Keough to design a new building. Due to the high post-WWI inflation, only one section of the original plan was constructed in 1920. The school opened for classes in early 1921.

The school district population continued to increase, however, and the already small school became even more crowded. Durand voters turned down one millage proposal in the mid-1920s, but in 1928 approved an expansion of the school. It was designed by the Detroit architecture firm of Van Leyen, Schilling, Keough and Reynolds. In 1929, a wing was added. In the 1950 and 1960s, Durand consolidated with surrounding rural districts. In 1965, a new high school was constructed, and the former high school was converted to a junior high.

The junior high was closed in 1996, and sold by the school district to new owners. The Woda Group then converted the building into senior housing. Woda Group is an Ohio-based company managing dozens of affordable housing developments.

== Description ==
The former Durand High School is a three-story, E-shaped, red-and-brown brick Tudor Revival school building. The front facade is nine bays wide, with stair/entry towers with wide limestone entry arches at each end. The facade has brick quoins at the corners, a limestone water table and stringcourse on the second floor, a cornice band above the third floor windows, and a stone parapet cap. In each bay is a set of two, two-over-two double-hung windows, aligned on each floor. The towers have three-sided bay windows above the entrances in the upper two stories.

== See also ==
- Coventry House: historic building converted into senior housing by the Woda Group
- National Register of Historic Places listings in Shiawassee County, Michigan
