= Emily Steiner =

American Medievalist

Academic background
- Education: Brown University
- Thesis: When the problem exceeds the presence : English attitudes towareds Jews in post-expulsion sermonic literature (1993)

Emily Steiner is the A. M. Rosenthal Professor of English at the University of Pennsylvania. She is known for her work on medieval literature and middle English literature and culture. She was elected a Fellow of the Medieval Academy of America in 2026.

== Education and career ==
Steiner has a Bachelors of Arts from Brown University and a Doctor of Philosophy from Yale University. Steiner started teaching at the University of Pennsylvania as an assistant professor in the Department of English in 1999, and was promoted to associate professor in 2005. The University of Pennsylvania raised Steiner to the role of full professor in 2015 and the Rose Family Endowed Term Professor of English in 2021, a position that she holds as of 2022.

== Selected publications ==
- Steiner, Emily; Barrington, Candace, eds. (2002-04-01). The Letter of the Law: Legal Practice and Literary Production in Medieval England. Cornell University Press.
- Steiner, Emily (2003). Documentary culture and the making of medieval English literature. Cambridge, U.K.: Cambridge University Press. ISBN 0-521-82484-2. OCLC 51914335.
- Steiner, Emily (2013). Reading Piers Plowman. Cambridge. ISBN 978-0-521-86820-4. OCLC 822971454.
- Steiner, Emily; Ransom, Lynn, eds. (2015). Taxonomies of knowledge : information and order in medieval manuscripts. Philadelphia. ISBN 978-0-8122-4759-6. OCLC 910239505.
- Steiner, Emily (2021). John Trevisa's information age : knowledge and the pursuit of literature, c. 1400 (First ed.). Oxford. ISBN 978-0-19-265082-5. OCLC 1264709826.
