= Mary Elizabeth Tyler =

Ku Klux Klan organizer (1881 – 1924)

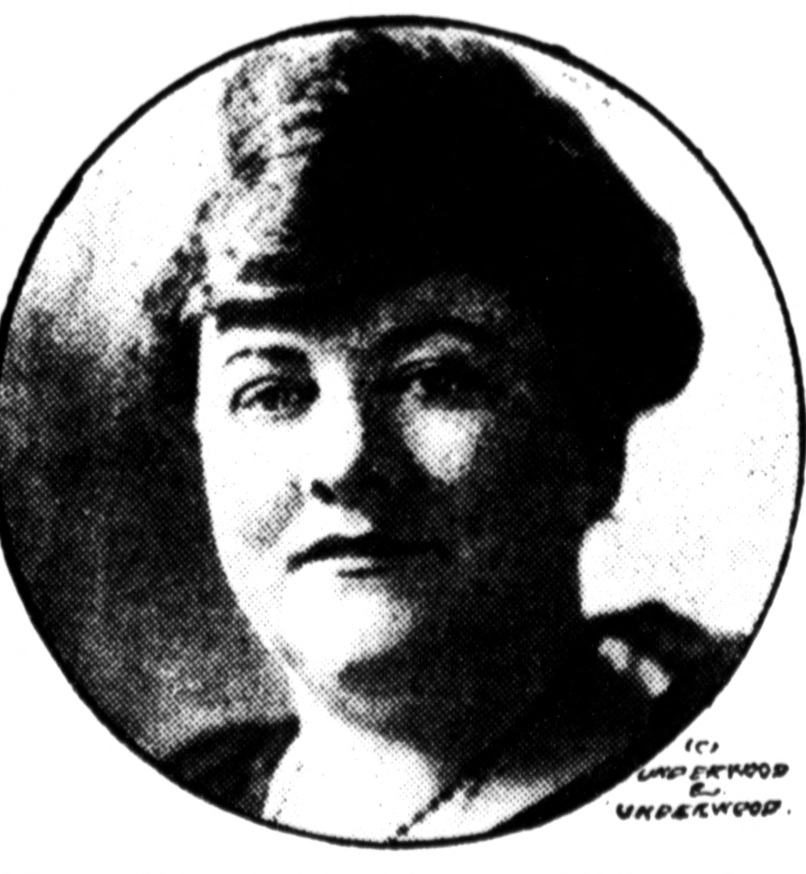
- Depicted in a contemporary newspaper, 1922
- Born: July 10, 1881; Georgia, U.S.
- Died: September 10, 1924 (aged 43); Altadena, California, U.S.
- Resting place: Inglewood Park Cemetery, Inglewood, California

Mary Elizabeth Tyler (July 10, 1881 – September 10, 1924) was an Atlanta public-relations professional who, along with Edward Young Clarke, founded the Southern Publicity Association. Their organization helped to turn the initially anemic second Ku Klux Klan into a mass-membership organization with a broader social agenda. They also worked with the Anti-Saloon League during the same period.

== Civic engagement ==
Tyler became active in the "better babies" movement as a volunteer hygiene worker in the 1910s. With Clarke, she formed the Atlanta-based Southern Publicity Association, which promoted temperance and public health causes such as the Anti-Saloon League and American Red Cross. Like Clarke and the second Klan's initial organizer William Simmons, Tyler was active in fraternal organizations—in her case, in a women's auxiliary called the Daughters of America.

Starting in 1920, Tyler and Clarke were successful in building the organization of the Klan and in promoting a broader agenda for it, including temperance, anticommunism, antisemitism, and anti-Catholicism. They did well for themselves financially, pocketing 80% of every new Klansman's initiation fee, all the while investing in businesses that manufactured Klan robes and paraphernalia. Tyler owned the Searchlight, the Klan's newspaper. She built a large classical-revival house on 14 acres in downtown Atlanta; the house is now listed in the National Register of Historic Places.

Clarke and Tyler's sexual relationship was not a well kept secret, and Clarke's wife May sued him for divorce on grounds of desertion. In 1919, Clarke and Tyler were rousted out of bed by Atlanta police and arrested on charges of disorderly conduct. They initially gave false names. Notwithstanding the Klan's temperance activities, they were fined for possessing whiskey. Their sexual relationship was in tension with the prominent role played by the purity of white womanhood in the organization's foundational mythology, which revolved around the real-life figure of Mary Phagan and the film The Birth of a Nation, which features the fictional martyr Flora Cameron. In 1921, the Columbus Enquirer-Sun and the New York World published articles accusing Clarke and Tyler of financial and sexual misconduct. An internal power struggle ensued within the Klan, and as a result Tyler was forced out of the Klan in 1923, Clarke left the country to escape charges under the Mann Act, and power shifted to Hiram Wesley Evans. Tyler moved to Southern California.

== Personal life ==
Tyler was first married at age 14 or 15, and then abandoned, and later married multiple times. Likely names of her husbands were Andrew M. Manning (married 1897; divorced 1906), Owen C. Carroll (died Washington D.C. in 1913), and Stephen Walcott Grow (married 1920).

Tyler died on September 10, 1924, in Altadena, California, of apoplexy and arteriosclerosis. She was buried in Inglewood Park Cemetery.
