= 1944 in the United States =

- Decades: 1920s; 1930s; 1940s; 1950s; 1960s
- See also: History of the United States (1918–1945); Timeline of United States history (1930–1949); List of years in the United States

Events from the year 1944 in the United States.

== Incumbents ==
=== Federal government ===
- President: Franklin D. Roosevelt (D-New York)
- Vice President: Henry A. Wallace (D-Iowa)
- Chief Justice: Harlan F. Stone (New York)
- Speaker of the House of Representatives: Sam Rayburn (D-Texas)
- Senate Majority Leader: Alben W. Barkley (D-Kentucky)
- Congress: 78th

==== State governments ====
Governors and lieutenant governors

=== Governors ===
- Governor of Alabama: Chauncey Sparks (Democratic)
- Governor of Arizona: Sidney Preston Osborn (Democratic)
- Governor of Arkansas: Homer Martin Adkins (Democratic)
- Governor of California: Earl Warren (Republican)
- Governor of Colorado: John Charles Vivian (Republican)
- Governor of Connecticut: Raymond E. Baldwin (Republican)
- Governor of Delaware: Walter W. Bacon (Republican)
- Governor of Florida: Spessard Holland (Democratic)
- Governor of Georgia: Ellis Arnall (Democratic)
- Governor of Idaho: C. A. Bottolfsen (Republican)
- Governor of Illinois: Dwight H. Green (Republican)
- Governor of Indiana: Henry F. Schricker (Democratic)
- Governor of Iowa: Bourke B. Hickenlooper (Republican)
- Governor of Kansas: Andrew F. Schoeppel (Republican)
- Governor of Kentucky: Simeon S. Willis (Republican)
- Governor of Louisiana: Sam H. Jones (Democratic) (until May 9), Jimmie H. Davis (Democratic) (starting May 9)
- Governor of Maine: Sumner Sewall (Republican)
- Governor of Maryland: Herbert R. O'Conor (Democratic)
- Governor of Massachusetts: Leverett Saltonstall (Republican)
- Governor of Michigan: Harry Kelly (Republican)
- Governor of Minnesota: Edward John Thye (Republican)
- Governor of Mississippi: Dennis Murphree (Democratic) (until January 18), Thomas L. Bailey (Democratic) (starting January 18)
- Governor of Missouri: Forrest C. Donnell (Republican)
- Governor of Montana: Sam C. Ford (Republican)
- Governor of Nebraska: Dwight Griswold (Republican)
- Governor of Nevada: Edward P. Carville (Democratic)
- Governor of New Hampshire: Robert O. Blood (Republican)
- Governor of New Jersey: Charles Edison (Democratic) (until January 18), Walter Evans Edge (Republican) (starting January 18)
- Governor of New Mexico: John J. Dempsey (Democratic)
- Governor of New York: Thomas Dewey (Republican)
- Governor of North Carolina: J. Melville Broughton (Democratic)
- Governor of North Dakota: John Moses (Democratic)
- Governor of Ohio: John W. Bricker (Republican)
- Governor of Oklahoma: Robert S. Kerr (Democratic)
- Governor of Oregon: Earl Snell (Republican)
- Governor of Pennsylvania: Edward Martin (Republican)
- Governor of Rhode Island: J. Howard McGrath (Democratic)
- Governor of South Carolina: Olin D. Johnston (Democratic)
- Governor of South Dakota: Merrill Q. Sharpe (Republican)
- Governor of Tennessee: Prentice Cooper (Democratic)
- Governor of Texas: Coke R. Stevenson (Democratic)
- Governor of Utah: Herbert B. Maw (Democratic)
- Governor of Vermont: William H. Wills (Republican)
- Governor of Virginia: Colgate Darden (Democratic)
- Governor of Washington: Arthur B. Langlie (Republican)
- Governor of West Virginia: Matthew M. Neely (Democratic)
- Governor of Wisconsin: Walter S. Goodland (Republican)
- Governor of Wyoming: Lester C. Hunt (Democratic)

=== Lieutenant governors ===
- Lieutenant Governor of Alabama: Leven H. Ellis (Democratic)
- Lieutenant Governor of Arkansas: James Lavesque Shaver (Democratic)
- Lieutenant Governor of California: Frederick F. Houser (Republican)
- Lieutenant Governor of Colorado: William Eugene Higby (Republican)
- Lieutenant Governor of Connecticut: William L. Hadden (Republican)
- Lieutenant Governor of Delaware: Isaac J. MacCollum (Democratic)
- Lieutenant Governor of Idaho: Edwin Nelson (Republican)
- Lieutenant Governor of Illinois: Hugh W. Cross (Republican)
- Lieutenant Governor of Indiana: Charles M. Dawson (Democratic)
- Lieutenant Governor of Iowa: Robert D. Blue (Republican)
- Lieutenant Governor of Kansas: Jess C. Denious (Republican)
- Lieutenant Governor of Kentucky: Kenneth H. Tuggle (political party unknown)
- Lieutenant Governor of Louisiana: Marc M. Mouton (Democratic) (until May 9), J. Emile Verret (Democratic) (starting May 9)
- Lieutenant Governor of Massachusetts: Horace T. Cahill (Republican)
- Lieutenant Governor of Michigan: Eugene C. Keyes (Republican)
- Lieutenant Governor of Minnesota: Archie H. Miller (Republican)
- Lieutenant Governor of Mississippi: vacant (until January 18), Fielding L. Wright (Republican) (starting January 18)
- Lieutenant Governor of Missouri: Frank Gaines Harris (Democratic) (until December 30), vacant (starting December 30)
- Lieutenant Governor of Montana: Ernest T. Eaton (Republican)
- Lieutenant Governor of Nebraska: Roy W. Johnson (Republican)
- Lieutenant Governor of Nevada: Vail M. Pittman (Democratic)
- Lieutenant Governor of New Mexico: James B. Jones (Democratic)
- Lieutenant Governor of New York: Joseph R. Hanley (Republican)
- Lieutenant Governor of North Carolina: Reginald L. Harris (Democratic)
- Lieutenant Governor of North Dakota: Henry Holt (Democratic) (until month and day unknown), vacant (starting month and day unknown)
- Lieutenant Governor of Ohio: Paul M. Herbert (Republican)
- Lieutenant Governor of Oklahoma: James E. Berry (Democratic)
- Lieutenant Governor of Pennsylvania: John C. Bell, Jr. (Republican)
- Lieutenant Governor of Rhode Island: Louis W. Cappelli (Democratic) (until month and day unknown), vacant (starting month and day unknown)
- Lieutenant Governor of South Carolina: Ransome Judson Williams (Democratic)
- Lieutenant Governor of South Dakota: A. C. Miller (Republican)
- Lieutenant Governor of Tennessee: Joseph H. Ballew (Democratic)
- Lieutenant Governor of Texas: John Lee Smith (Democratic)
- Lieutenant Governor of Vermont: Mortimer R. Proctor (Republican)
- Lieutenant Governor of Virginia: William M. Tuck (Democratic)
- Lieutenant Governor of Washington: Victor A. Meyers (Democratic)
- Lieutenant Governor of Wisconsin: Oscar Rennebohm (Republican)

== Events ==
=== January ===
- January 20 – The U.S. Army 36th Infantry Division, in Italy, attempts to cross the Gari River.
- January 22 – World War II – Battle of Anzio: the Allies begin the assault on Anzio, Italy. The U.S. Army 45th Infantry Division stands their ground at Anzio against violent assaults for 4 months.
- January 30 – World War II: United States troops invade Majuro, Marshall Islands.
- January 31
  - World War II: American forces land on Kwajalein Atoll and other islands in the Japanese-held Marshall Islands.
  - USS Franklin is commissioned.

=== February ===
- February 1 – World War II: United States troops land in the Marshall Islands.
- February 3 – World War II: United States troops capture the Marshall Islands.
- February 14 – SHAEF headquarters is established in Britain by General Dwight D. Eisenhower.
- February 17 – World War II: the Battle of Eniwetok Atoll begins; it ends in an American victory on February 23.
- February 20 – The United States takes Eniwetok Island.
- February 22 – United States Strategic Air Forces in Europe organized from the Eighth Air Force's strategic planning staff; subsuming strategic planning for all US Army Air Forces in Europe and Africa.
- February 29 – World War II – Battle of Los Negros and Operation Brewer: the Admiralty Islands are invaded by U.S. forces.

=== March ===
- March 1 – Essex-class aircraft carriers USS Tarawa (CV-40) and USS Kearsarge (CV-33) are laid down, at Norfolk Naval Shipyard and Brooklyn Navy Yard respectively.
- March 2 – The 16th Academy Awards ceremony, hosted by Jack Benny, is held, the first Oscar ceremony held at a large public venue, Grauman's Chinese Theatre in Hollywood. Michael Curtiz's Casablanca wins the Outstanding Motion Picture, with Curtiz winning Best Director. Henry King's The Song of Bernadette receives the most nominations with 12 and wins the most awards with four.
- March 4 – In Ossining, New York, Louis Buchalter, the leader of 1930s crime syndicate Murder, Inc., is executed at Sing Sing prison, along with Emanuel "Mendy" Weiss and Louis Capone.

=== April ===
- April 3 – Smith v. Allwright decided in the Supreme Court prohibits white primaries.
- April 25 – The United Negro College Fund is incorporated.
- April 28 – World War II: 749 American troops are killed in Exercise Tiger at Start Bay, Devon, England.

=== May ===
- May 8 – World War II: USS Ticonderoga is commissioned.
- May 24 – World War II: Six LSTs are accidentally destroyed and 163 men killed in Pearl Harbor's West Loch disaster.
- May 31 – World War II: Destroyer escort USS England sinks the sixth Japanese submarine in two weeks. This anti-submarine warfare performance remains unmatched through the twentieth century.

=== June ===
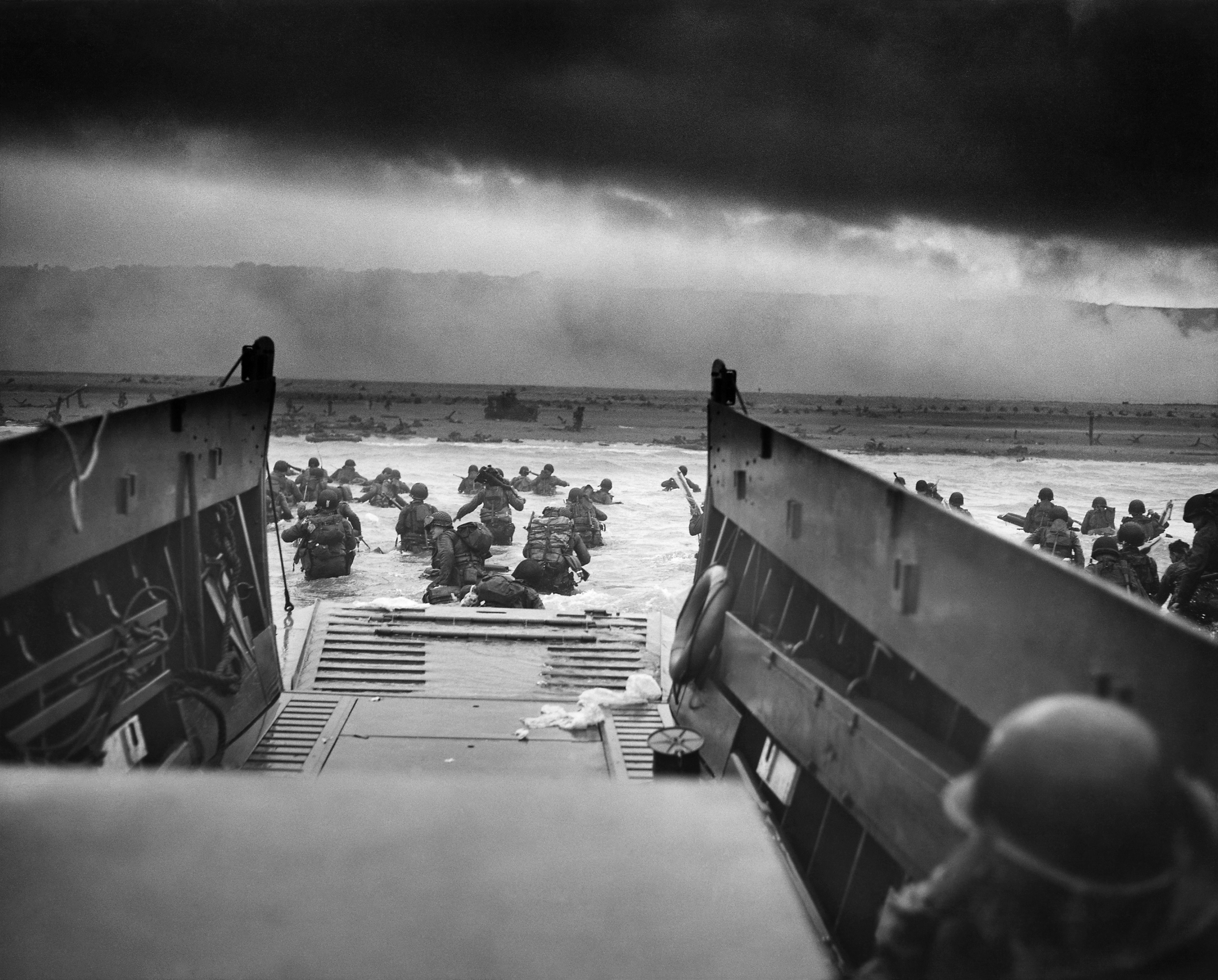
June 6: Normandy Landings

- June 4 – A hunter-killer group of the United States Navy captures the German submarine U-505, marking the first time a U.S. Navy vessel has captured an enemy vessel at sea since the 19th century.
- June 5 – US and British paratrooper divisions jump over Normandy, in preparation for D-Day. All including 82nd and 101st Airborne divisions of the United States.
- June 6 – World War II – Battle of Normandy: Operation Overlord, commonly known as D-Day, commences with the landing of 155,000 Allied troops on the beaches of Normandy in France. The Allied soldiers quickly break through the Atlantic Wall and push inland, in the largest amphibious military operation in history. This operation helps liberate France from Germany and also weakens the Nazi hold on Europe.
- June 15
  - Battle of Saipan: the United States invades Saipan.
  - American forces push back the Germans in Saint-Lô, capturing the city.
- June 16 – George Stinney, a 14-year old African-American, is executed after being accused of killing two white girls in his hometown, Alcolu, South Carolina. The execution takes place in South Carolina Penitentiary in Columbia, South Carolina by electric chair.
- June 26 – World War II: American troops enter Cherbourg.

=== July ===
- July 1 – The United Nations Monetary and Financial Conference begins at Bretton Woods, New Hampshire.
- July 6
  - Hartford Circus Fire: More than 100 children die in one of the worst fire disasters in the history of the United States.
  - World War II: At Camp Hood, Texas, future baseball star and 1st Lt. Jackie Robinson is arrested and later court-martialed for refusing to move to the back of a segregated U.S. Army bus. He is eventually acquitted.
- July 17 – Port Chicago disaster: The SS E. A. Bryan, loaded with ammunition, explodes at the Port Chicago, California, Naval Magazine, killing 320 sailors and civilian personnel.
- July 19 – President Franklin D. Roosevelt is renominated for a fourth term at the 1944 Democratic National Convention. Missouri Senator Harry Truman is selected to be the vice presidential nominee.
- July 21 – Battle of Guam: American troops land on Guam (the battle ends August 10).

=== August ===
- August 6 – USS Bennington is commissioned.
- August 7 – IBM dedicates the first program-controlled computer, the electromechanical Automatic Sequence Controlled Calculator (known best as the Harvard Mark I).
- August 9 – The United States Forest Service and the Wartime Advertising Council release posters featuring Smokey Bear for the first time.
- August 12 – Major fire at Luna Park, Coney Island, New York.
- August 14 – Fort Lawton riot
- August 15 – World War II: Operation Dragoon lands Allies in southern France. The U.S. Army 45th Infantry Division participates in its fourth assault landing at St. Maxime, spearheading the drive for the Belfort Gap.
- August 20 – World War II: American forces successfully defeat Nazi forces at Chambois, closing the Falaise Gap.
- August 22 – World War II: Tsushima Maru, an unmarked Japanese passenger/cargo ship, is sunk by torpedoes launched by the submarine USS Bowfin off Akuseki-jima, killing 1,484 civilians including 767 schoolchildren.
- August 31 – The mysterious "Mad Gasser of Mattoon" attacks in Mattoon, Illinois, apparently resume.

=== September ===
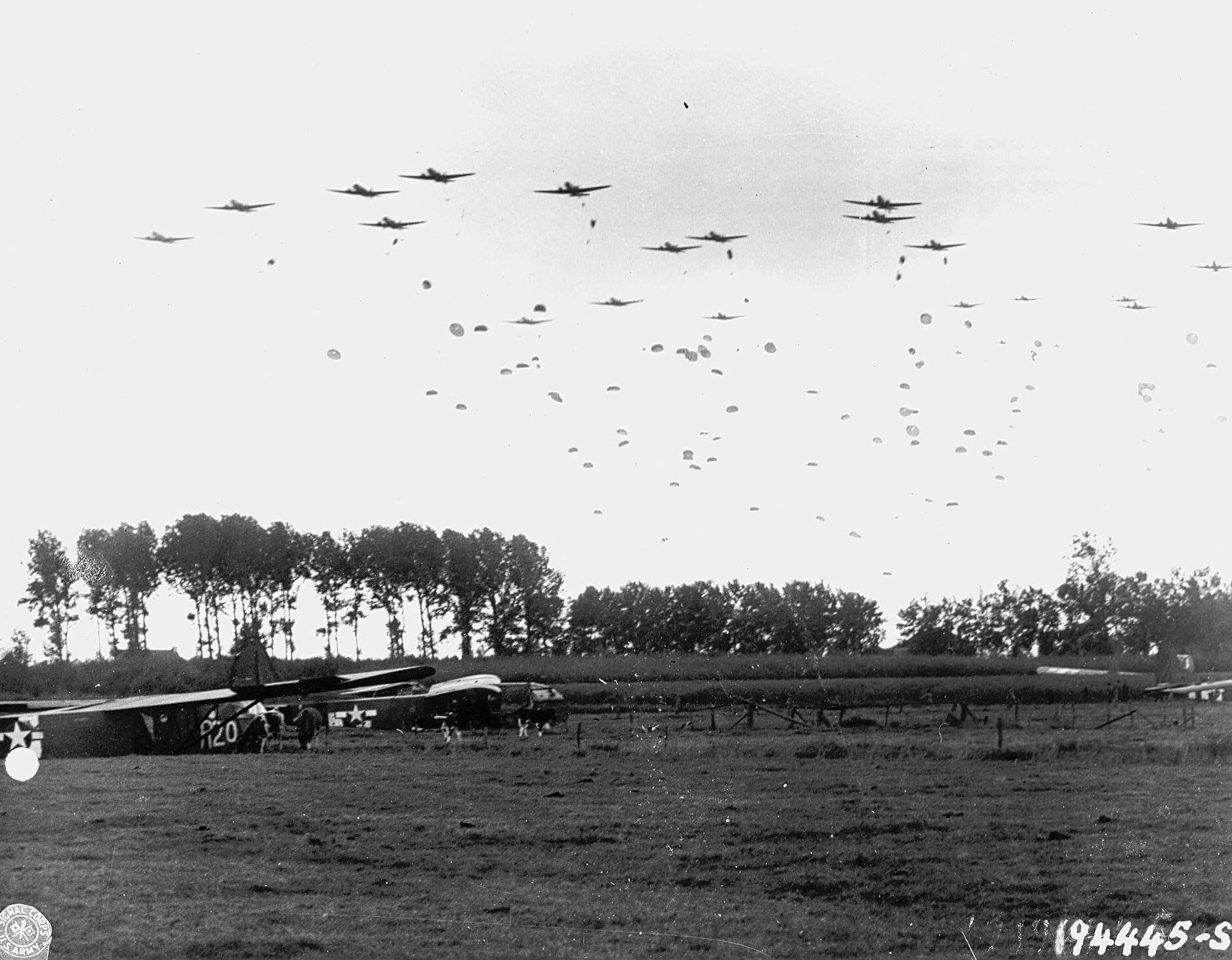
September 17–25: Operation Market Garden

- September 3 – Black mother Recy Taylor is kidnapped and gang raped by six white men in Abbeville, Alabama; failure to indict any of her assailants provokes nationwide protest and activism among the African American community.
- September 5 – The 5.8 M_{w} Cornwall–Massena earthquake affects the northern New York town of Massena at the Canada–United States border with a maximum Mercalli intensity of VII (Very strong), causing $2 million in damage, but no deaths. Across the border, Cornwall, Ontario suffers greater damage.
- September 14 – USS Shangri-La is commissioned.
- September 17 – World War II: Operation Market Garden begins.
- September 24 – World War II: the U.S. Army 45th Infantry Division takes the strongly defended city of Epinal before crossing the Moselle River and entering the western foothills of the Vosges.
- September 25 – World War II: Operation Market Garden ends in an Allied withdrawal.

=== October ===
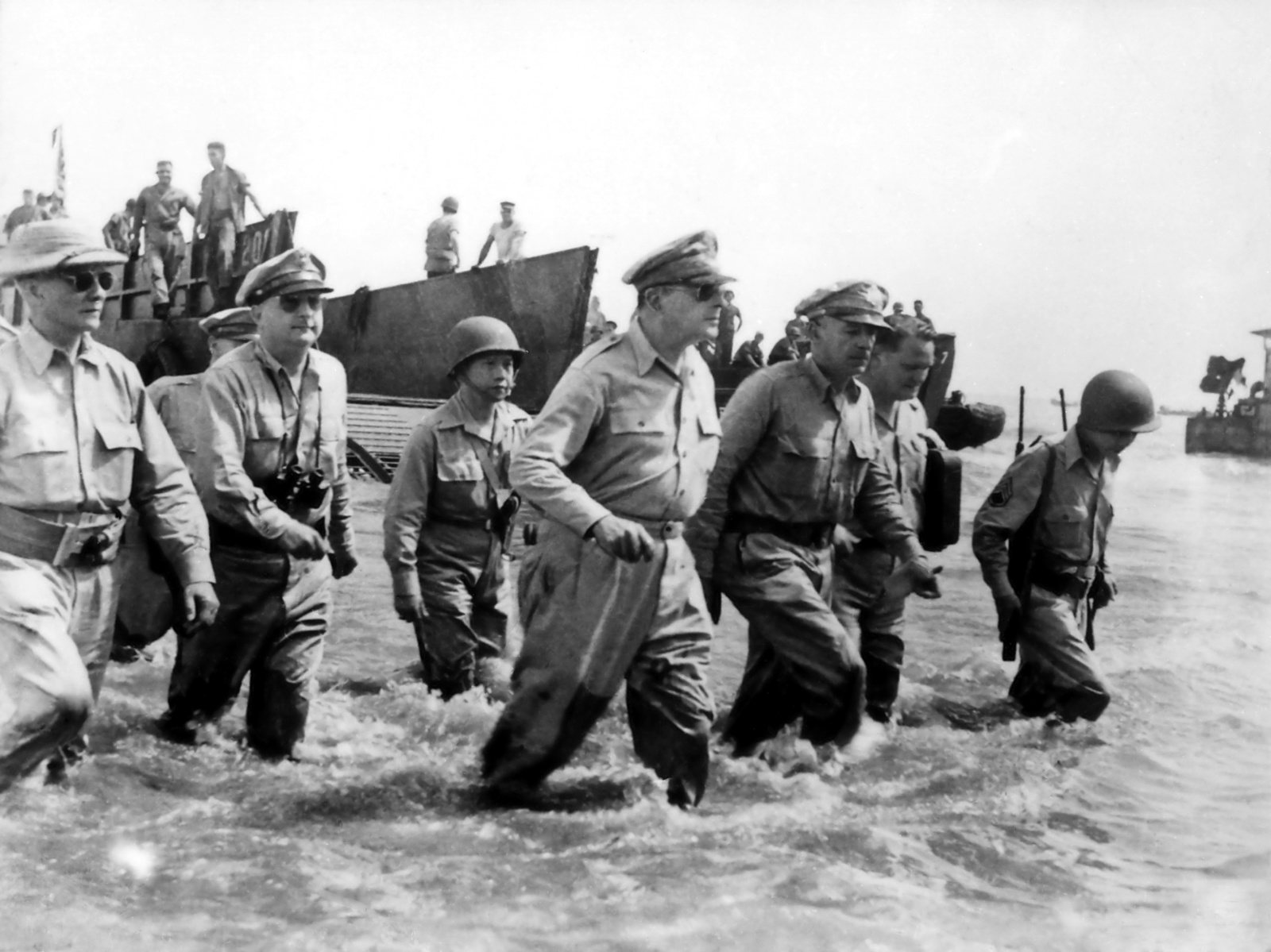
October 20: Douglas MacArthur returns to the Philippines

- October 8 – The Adventures of Ozzie and Harriet radio show debuts in the United States.
- October 9
  - The St. Louis Cardinals defeat the St. Louis Browns, 4 games to 2, to win their 5th World Series Title. This is the only all St. Louis World Series.
  - USS Randolph is commissioned.
- October 20
  - World War II: American and Filipino troops (with Filipino guerrillas) begin the Battle of Leyte in the Philippines. American forces land on Red Beach in Palo, Leyte, as General Douglas MacArthur returns to the Philippines with Philippine Commonwealth president Sergio Osmeña and Armed Forces of the Philippines Generals Basilio J. Valdes and Carlos P. Romulo. American forces land on the beaches in Dulag, Leyte, accompanied by Filipino troops entering the town, and fiercely opposed by the Japanese occupation forces. The combined forces liberate Tacloban.
  - An LNG explosion destroys a square mile (2.6 km^{2}) of Cleveland, Ohio.
- October 21 – World War II: Aachen, the first German city to fall, is captured by American troops.
- October 23–26 – World War II: Naval Battle of Leyte Gulf in the Philippines – In the largest naval battle in history by most criteria and the last naval battle in history between battleships, combined U.S. and Australian naval forces decisively defeat the Imperial Japanese Navy.
- October 25 – Florence Foster Jenkins gives a notorious recital in Carnegie Hall, New York City.
- October 30 – Appalachian Spring, a ballet by Martha Graham with music by Aaron Copland, debuts at the Library of Congress in Washington, D.C., with Graham in the lead role.

=== November ===
- November 6 – Hanford Site in Washington (state) produces its first plutonium.
- November 7
  - 1944 United States presidential election: Franklin D. Roosevelt wins reelection over Republican challenger Thomas E. Dewey, becoming the only U.S. president elected to a fourth term.
  - A passenger train derails in Aguadilla, Puerto Rico, due to excessive speed on a declining hill; 16 are killed, 50 injured.
- November 26 – USS Bon Homme Richard is commissioned.

=== December ===
- December 10 – Legendary Italian conductor Arturo Toscanini leads a concert performance of the first half of Beethoven's Fidelio (minus its spoken dialogue) on NBC Radio, starring Rose Bampton. He chooses this opera for its political message – a statement against tyranny and dictatorship. Presenting it in German, Toscanini intends it as a tribute to the German people who are being oppressed by Hitler. The second half is broadcast a week later. The performance is later released on LP and CD, the first of 7 operas that Toscanini conducts on radio.
- December 13 – Battle of Mindoro: United States, Australian and Philippine Commonwealth troops land in Mindoro Island, the Philippines.
- December 16 – General George C. Marshall becomes the first Five-Star General.
- December 22 – World War II: Brigadier General Anthony C. McAuliffe, commander of the U.S. forces defending Bastogne, refuses to accept demands for surrender by sending a one-word reply, "Nuts!", to the German command.
- December 24–26 – Agana race riot in Guam between white and black United States Marines.
- December 26
  - World War II: American troops repulse German forces at Bastogne.
  - The Glass Menagerie by Tennessee Williams premieres in Chicago.
- December 30 – Edward Stettinius Jr. becomes the last United States Secretary of State of the Roosevelt administration, filling the seat left by Cordell Hull.

=== Undated ===
- National Committee for Education on Alcoholism, predecessor of the National Council on Alcoholism and Drug Dependence, is established by Marty Mann.
- 14-year-old Warren Buffett's father introduces him to a newspaper office to do the job of taking a newspaper to the subscriber. Then, with a salary of US$1,200, he buys 40 acres of land and starts a sub-leased tenant farming business.
- Rio Grande company is founded in Albuquerque, New Mexico.

=== Ongoing ===
- World War II, U.S. involvement (1941–1945)

== Births ==
=== January ===
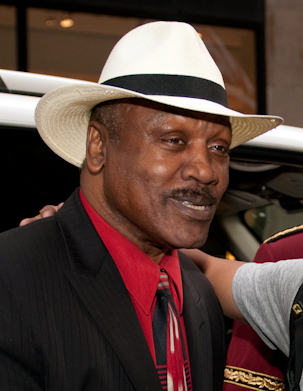
Joe Frazier

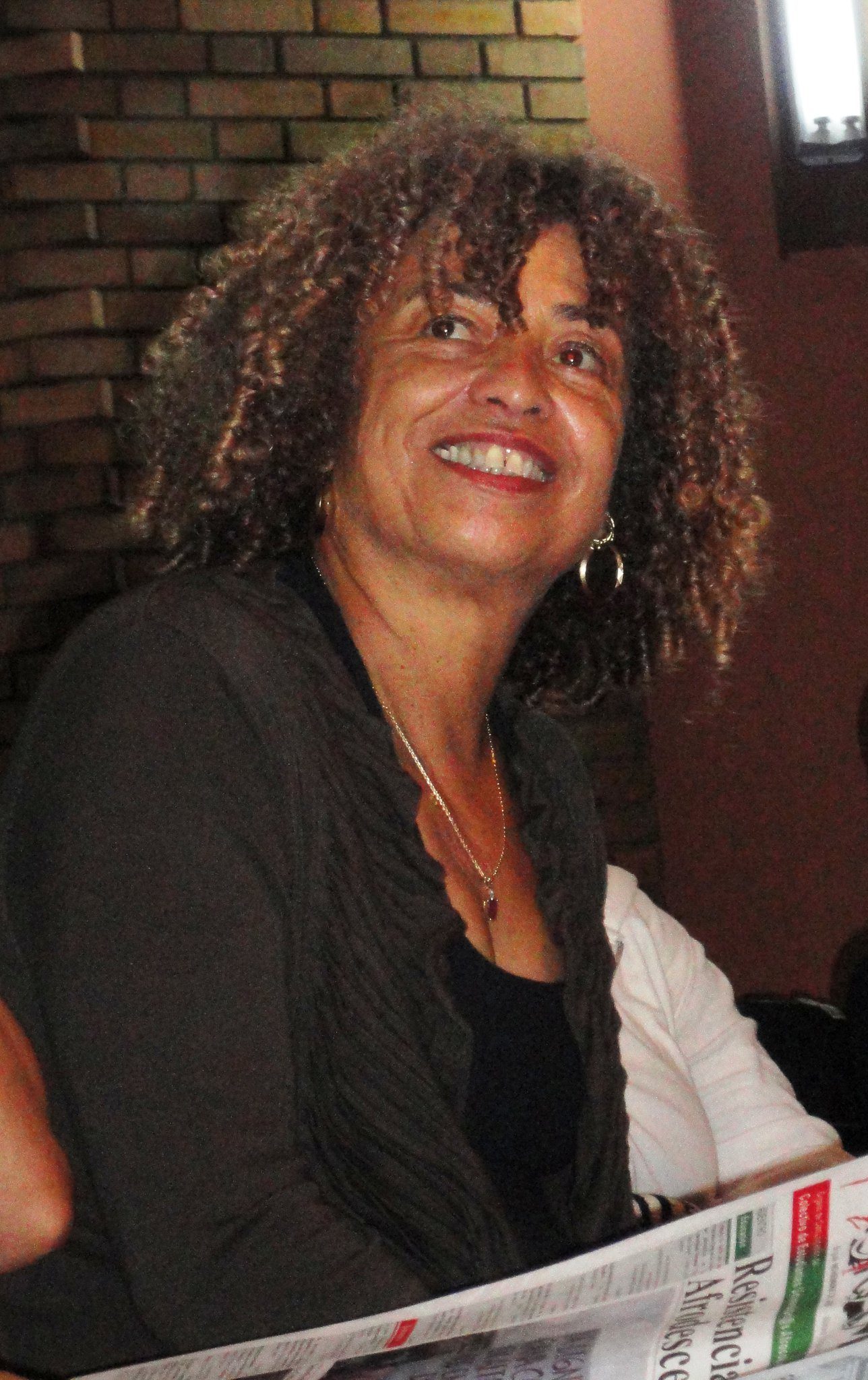
Angela Davis

- January 1
  - Jimmy Hart, American wrestling manager and singer
  - Robert Lee Minor, American actor, stunt performer
- January 2 – Lowell M. Snow, General authority of the Church of Jesus Christ of Latter-day Saints (LDS Church)
- January 4
  - Frank Alesia, American actor and television director (d. 2011)
  - Charlie Manuel, American baseball player and manager
- January 5 – Carolyn McCarthy, American nurse and politician
- January 6 – Bonnie Franklin, American actress, singer, dancer and television director (d. 2013)
- January 9 – Ian Hornak, American painter (d. 2002)
- January 10 – Frank Sinatra Jr., American singer, songwriter and actor (d. 2016)
- January 11 – Jim McAndrew, American baseball player (d. 2024)
- January 12 – Joe Frazier, African American boxer, world heavyweight champion from 1970 to 1973 (d. 2011)
- January 13 – Chris von Saltza, American swimmer
- January 19
  - Shelley Fabares, American actress, singer
  - Dan Reeves, American football player and coach (d. 2022)
- January 25 – Evan Chandler, American screenwriter and dentist (d. 2009)
- January 26
  - Angela Davis, African-American political activist, academic and author
  - Jerry Sandusky, American football coach and child molester
- January 27 – Sam Smith, American basketball player (d. 2022)
- January 28 – Susan Howard, American actress

=== February ===
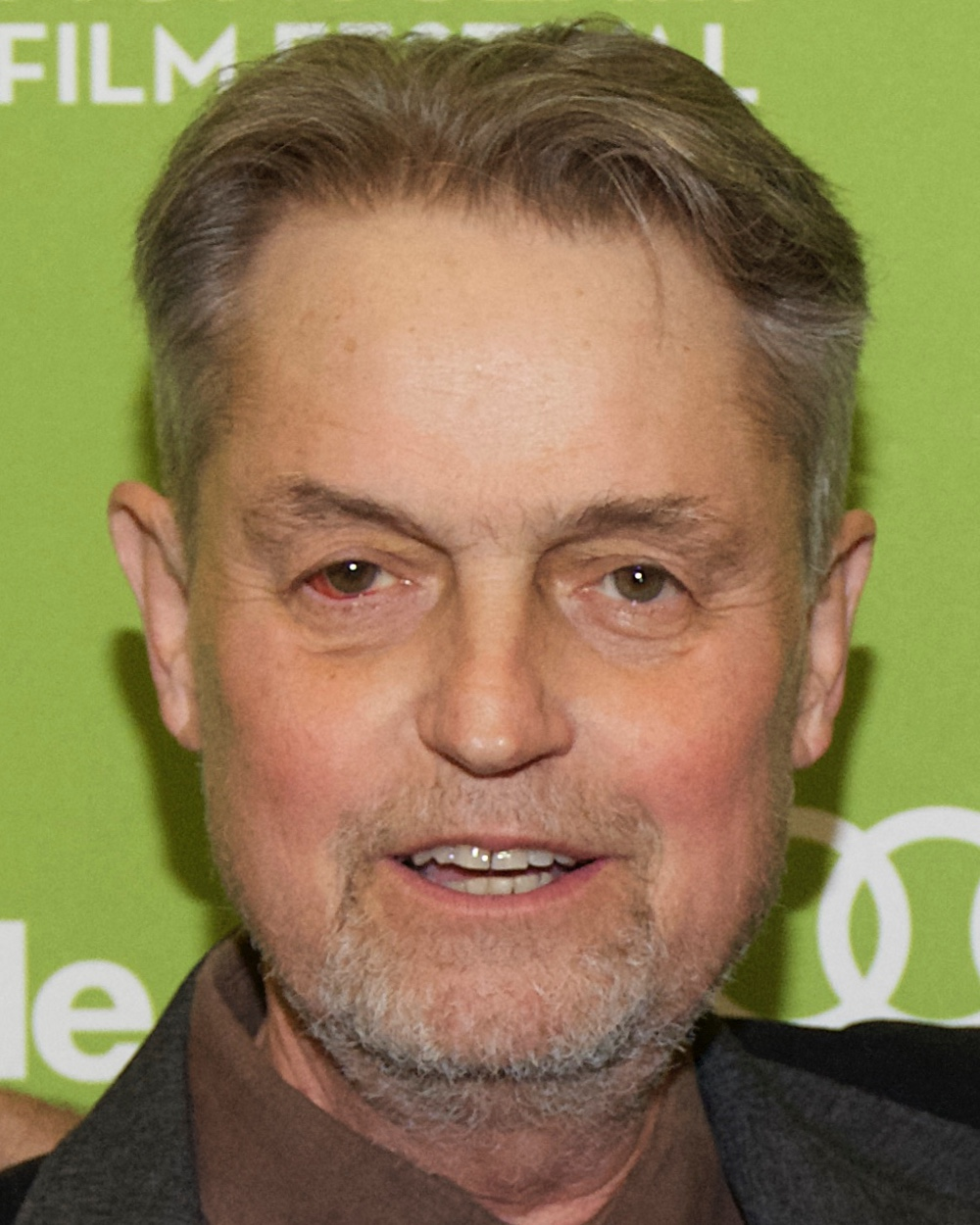
Jonathan Demme

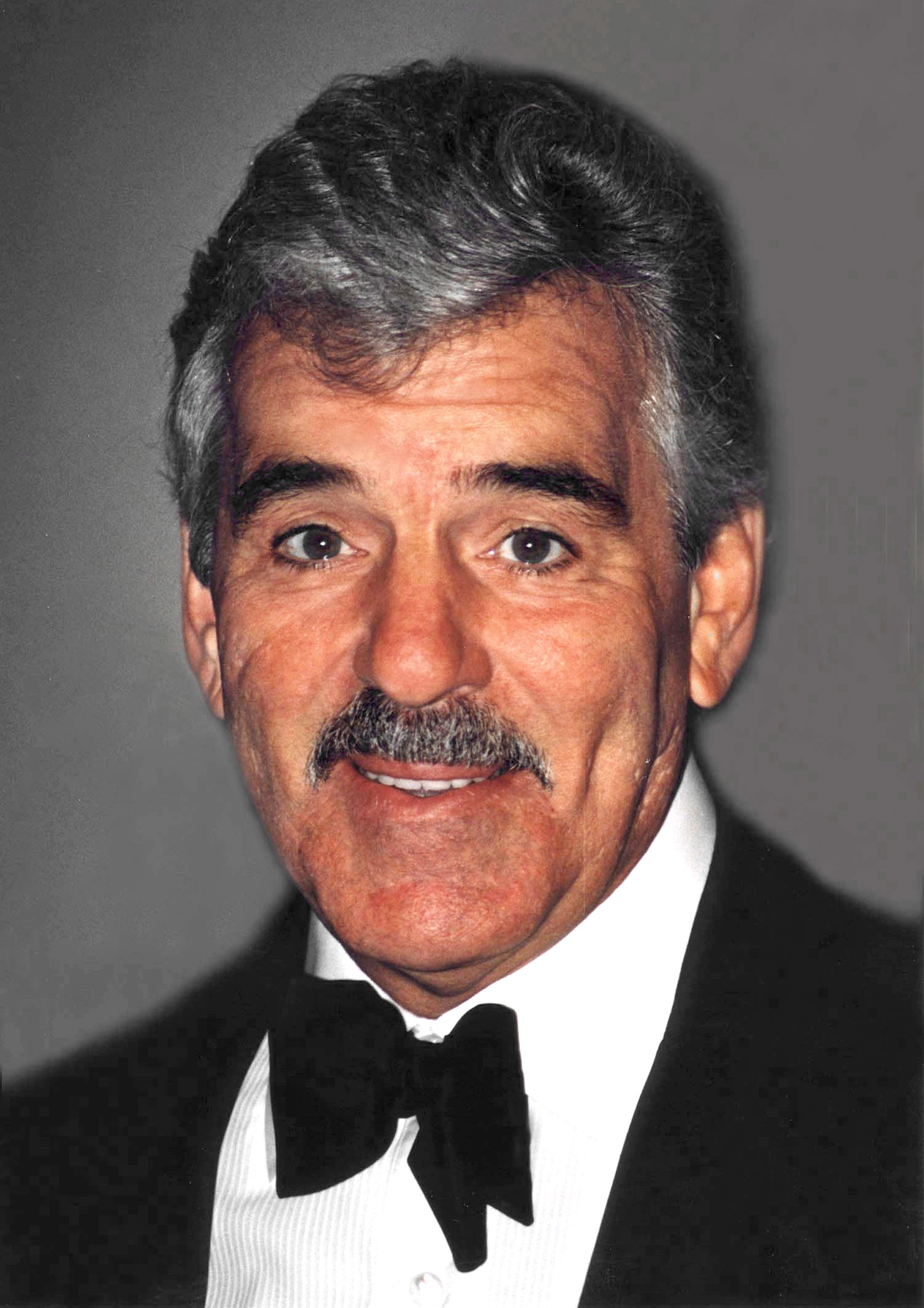
Dennis Farina

- February 1
  - Paul Blair, American baseball player (d. 2013)
  - Mike Enzi, American politician (d. 2021)
- February 3 – Wayne Comer, American baseball player (d. 2023)
- February 5 – Al Kooper, American rock musician (Blood, Sweat & Tears)
- February 8 – Bunky Henry, American professional golfer (d. 2018)
- February 9 – Alice Walker, African-American novelist and poet
- February 11 – Mike Oxley, American politician (d. 2016)
- February 12 – Moe Bandy, American country music singer
- February 13
  - Sal Bando, American baseball player and manager (d. 2023)
  - Stockard Channing, American actress
  - Michael Ensign, American actor
  - Sheldon Silver, American politician, attorney and convicted felon (d. 2022)
- February 14 – Carl Bernstein, American journalist
- February 15 – Rommy Hunt Revson, singer and inventor (d. 2022)
- February 16 – Richard Ford, American novelist
- February 19 – Donald F. Glut, American writer, film director and screenwriter
- February 22
  - Jonathan Demme, American film director, producer and screenwriter (d. 2017)
  - Robert Kardashian, American attorney and businessman (d. 2003)
- February 23
  - Ed Flanagan, American football player (d. 2023)
  - Johnny Winter, American rock musician (d. 2014)
- February 27 – Ken Grimwood, American writer (d. 2003)
- February 29
  - Dennis Farina, American actor (d. 2013)
  - Phyllis Frelich, American deaf actress (d. 2014)

=== March ===
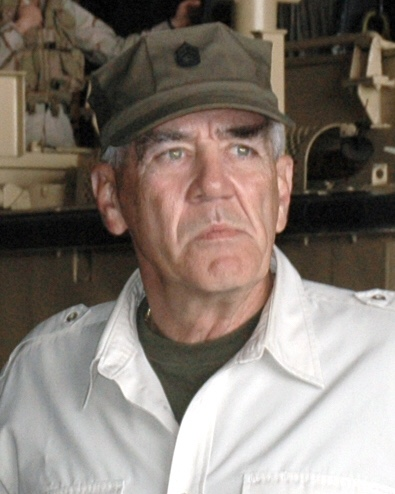
R. Lee Ermey

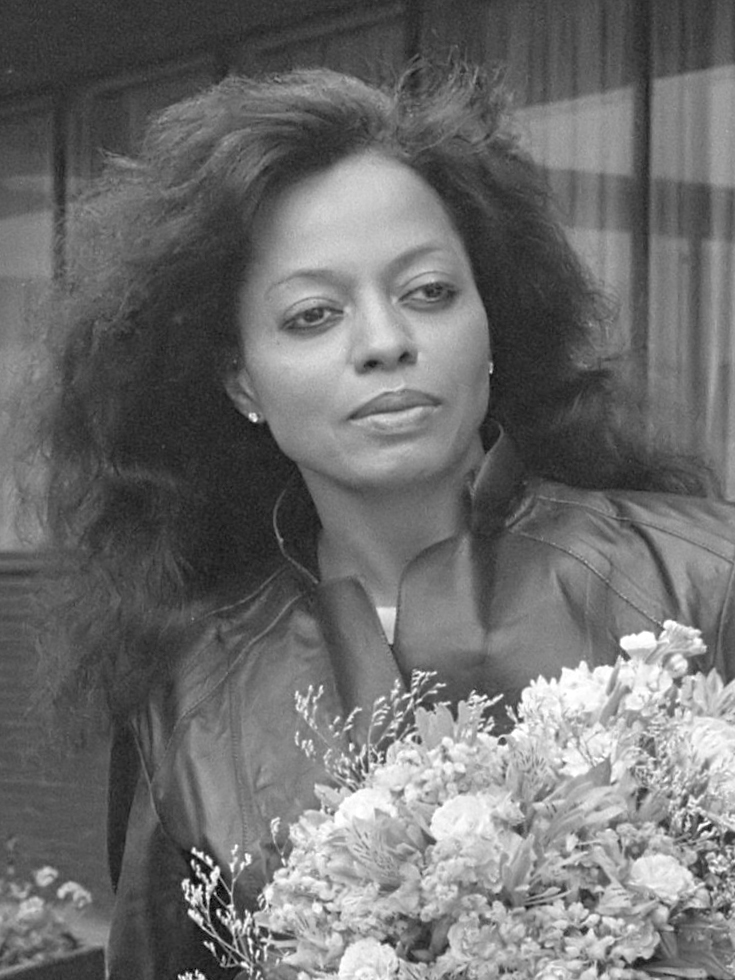
Diana Ross

- March 1 – John Breaux, American politician
- March 3 – Odessa Cleveland, American actress (M*A*S*H)
- March 4 – Bobby Womack, African-American singer-songwriter (d. 2014)
- March 6 – Mary Wilson, African-American singer (The Supremes) (d. 2021)
- March 7
  - Michael Rosbash, American geneticist and chronobiologist, recipient of the Nobel Prize in Physiology or Medicine in 2017
  - Townes Van Zandt, American country singer (d. 1997)
- March 8 – Carole Bayer Sager, American singer, songwriter
- March 11 – Richard McGeagh, American Olympic swimmer and water polo player (d. 2021)
- March 14 – Steve Daskewisz, American actor (d. 2018)
- March 15 – Ralph MacDonald, American percussionist, songwriter (d. 2011)
- March 16 – Granville Van Dusen, American actor
- March 17 – John Sebastian, American singer-songwriter (The Lovin' Spoonful)
- March 20 – Camille Cosby, philanthropist
- March 23 – Ric Ocasek, American singer, songwriter and record producer (The Cars) (d. 2019)
- March 24 – R. Lee Ermey, U.S. Marine and actor (d. 2018)
- March 26 – Diana Ross, African-American actress and singer (The Supremes)
- March 27 – Thomas H. Lee, American private equity investor (d. 2023)
- March 28
  - Rick Barry, American basketball player
  - Ken Howard, American actor (d. 2016)
- March 29 – Denny McLain, American baseball player
- March 31 – Angus King, American politician

=== April ===
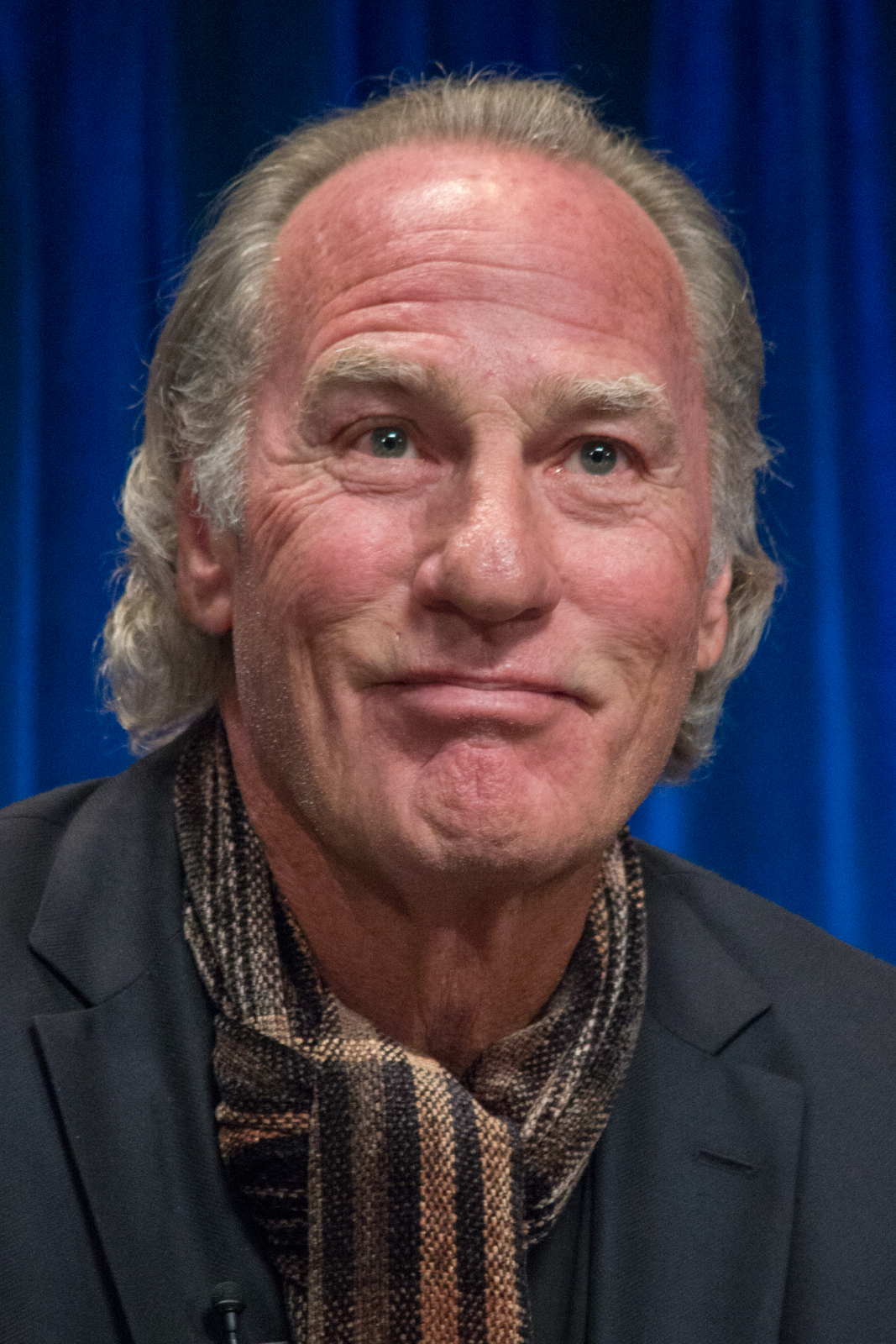
Craig T. Nelson

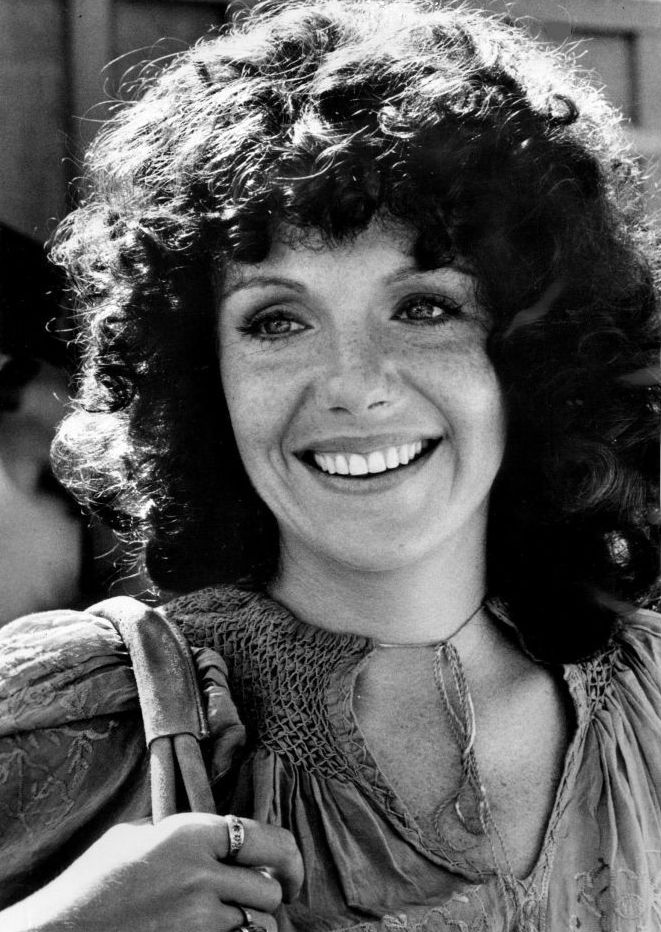
Jill Clayburgh

- April 1 – Rusty Staub, American baseball player and coach (d. 2018)
- April 3 – Tony Orlando, American musician
- April 4 – Craig T. Nelson, American actor
- April 5 – Peter King, American politician
- April 6 – Judith McConnell, American actress
- April 7
  - Shel Bachrach, American insurance broker, investor, businessman and philanthropist (d. 2024)
  - Warner Fusselle, American sportscaster (d. 2012)
- April 8 – Jimmy Walker, American professional basketball player (d. 2007)
- April 11 – John Milius, American film director, producer and screenwriter
- April 13 – Jack Casady, American rock musician (Jefferson Airplane, Hot Tuna)
- April 18
  - Robert Hanssen, American double agent (d. 2023)
  - Charlie Tuna, American disc jockey and game show announcer (d. 2016)
- April 19
  - Robert Holmes Bell, American district judge (d. 2023)
  - James Heckman, economist, recipient of the Nobel Memorial Prize in Economic Sciences in 2000
  - Bernie Worrell, American rock keyboardist, (d. 2016)
- April 21 – Paul Geremia, American singer-songwriter and guitarist
- April 22 – Steve Fossett, American millionaire adventurer (d. 2007)
- April 24 – Tony Visconti, American record producer, musician and singer
- April 26
  - Linda Hirshman, American lawyer and academic (d. 2023)
  - Larry H. Miller, American sports owner (Utah Jazz; d. 2009)
- April 27 – Cuba Gooding Sr., African-American actor and singer (d. 2017)
- April 29 – Richard Kline, American actor and television director
- April 30 – Jill Clayburgh, American actress (d. 2010)

=== May ===
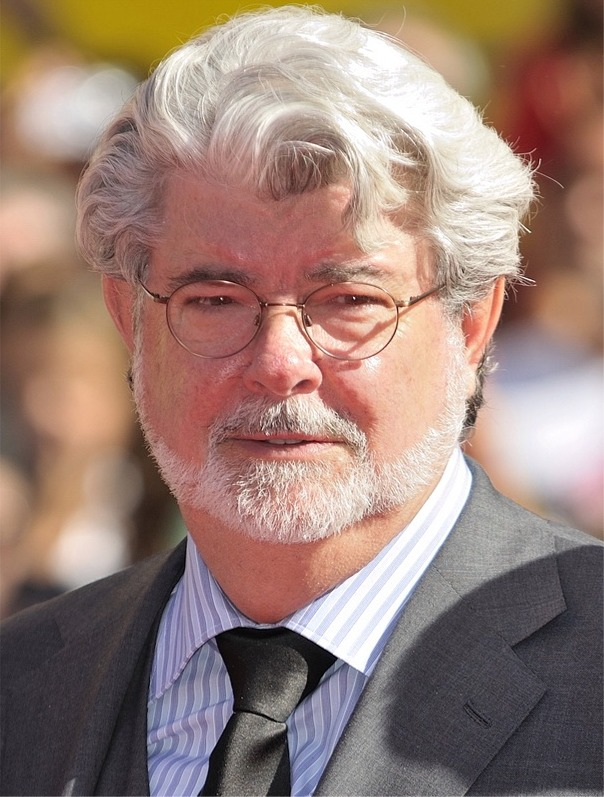
George Lucas

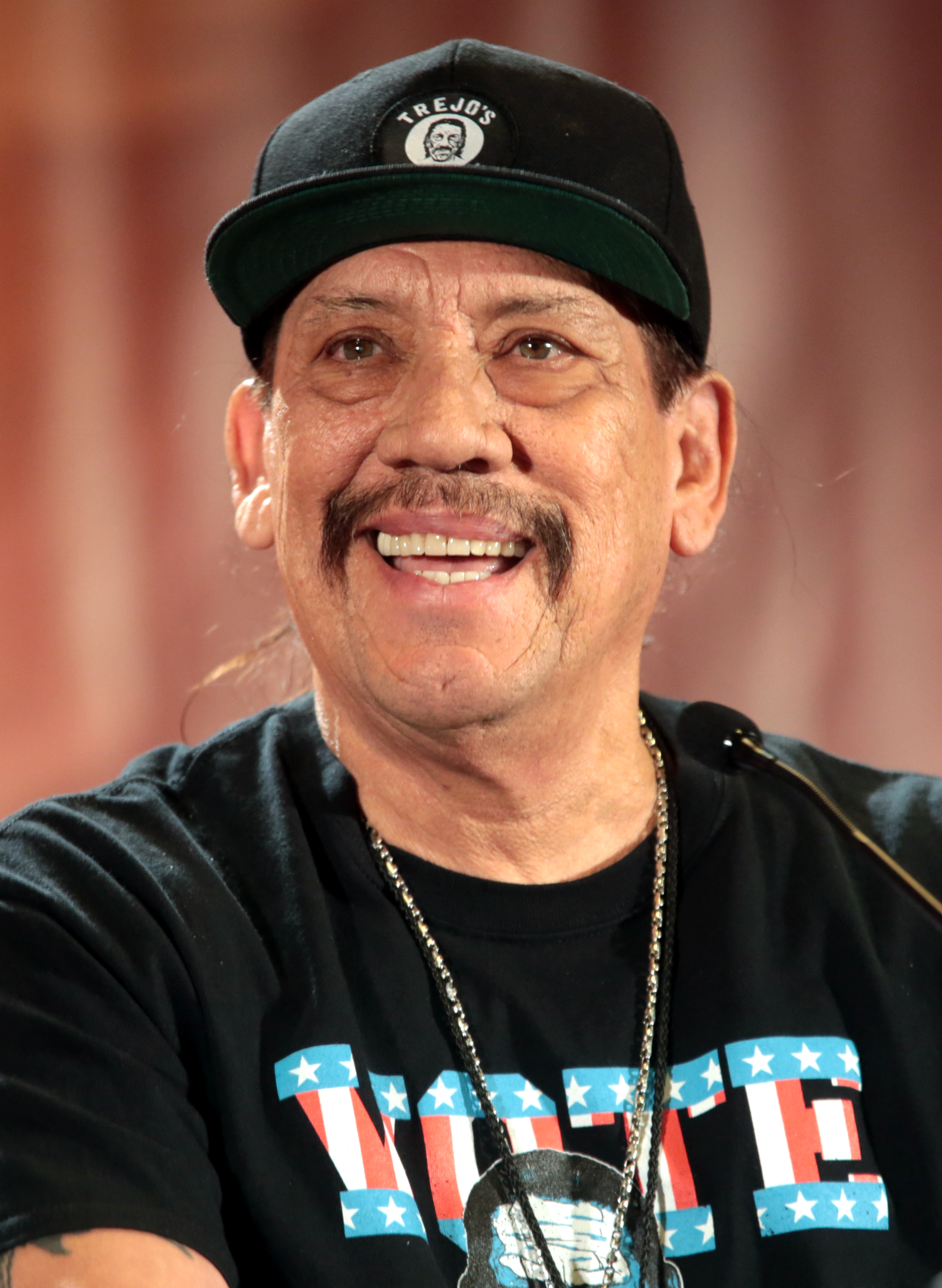
Danny Trejo

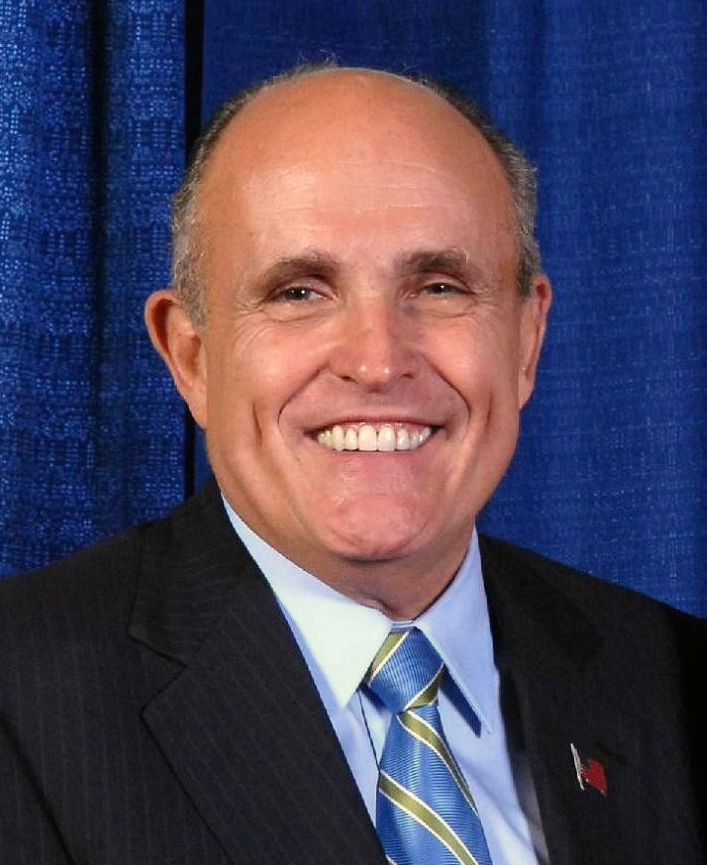
Rudy Giuliani

- May 1 – Marva Whitney, American singer (d. 2012)
- May 3 – Rusty Wier, American singer-songwriter (d. 2009)
- May 4 – Russi Taylor, American actress (d. 2019)
- May 9
  - Richie Furay, American musician (Poco, Buffalo Springfield)
  - Laurence Owen, American figure skater (d. 1961)
- May 10 – Jim Abrahams, American film director (d. 2024)
- May 13
  - Carolyn Franklin, American singer (d. 1988)
  - Armistead Maupin, American fiction writer
- May 14
  - Connie Lawn, American journalist (d. 2018)
  - George Lucas, American filmmaker and entrepreneur
- May 16 – Danny Trejo, Hispanic-American actor
- May 17 – Jesse Winchester, American-Canadian musician and songwriter (d. 2014)
- May 18 – Marianne Battani, American jurist (d. 2021)
- May 24
  - David Mark Berger, American-born Israeli weightlifter (k. in Munich massacre 1972)
  - Patti LaBelle, African-American singer, actress and entrepreneur
- May 26 – Jan Schakowsky, American politician
- May 27
  - Jon Brittenum, American football player (d. 2022)
  - Chris Dodd, American politician
- May 28
  - Rudy Giuliani, American politician, former Mayor of New York City
  - Gladys Knight, African-American singer
  - Sondra Locke, American actress and director (d. 2018)
  - Gary Stewart, American singer (d. 2003)
- May 30 – Meredith MacRae, American actress (d. 2000)

=== June ===
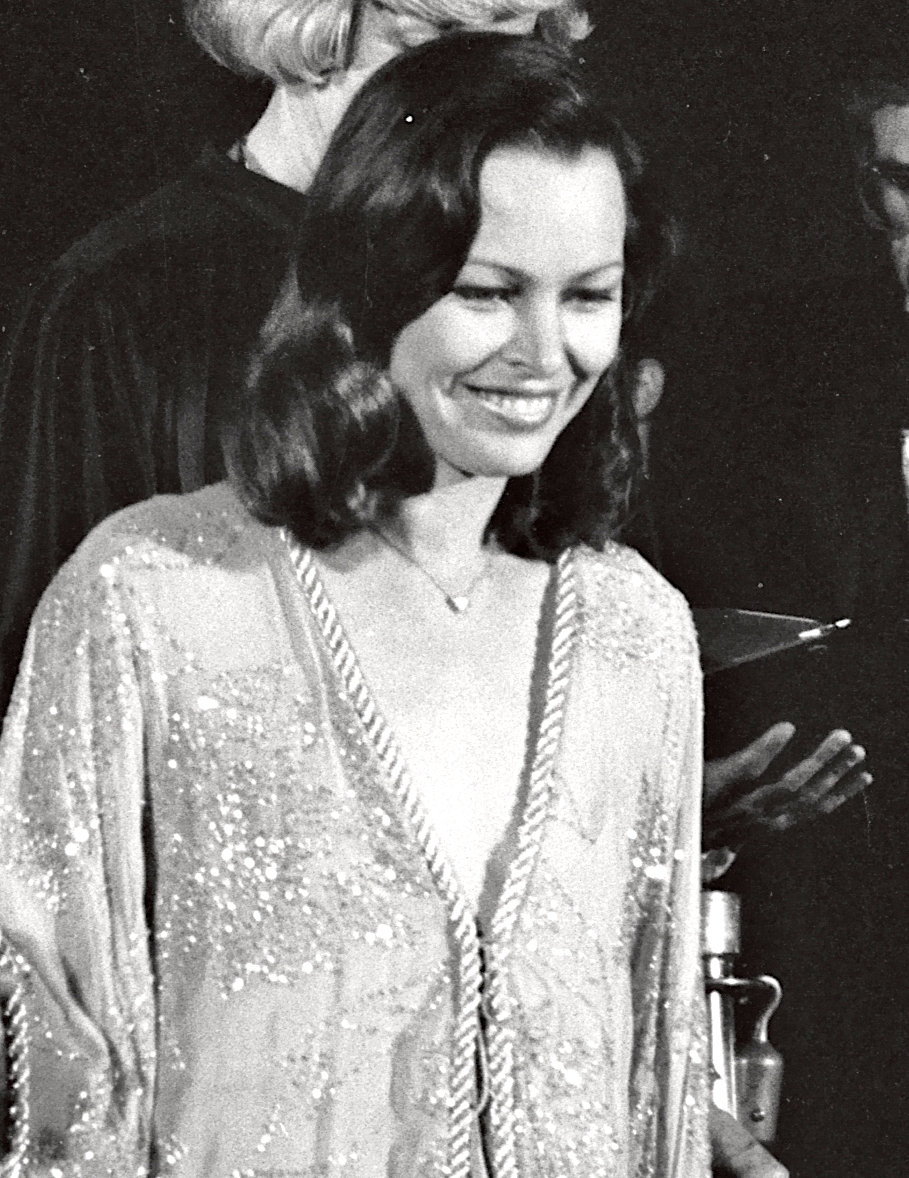
Michelle Phillips

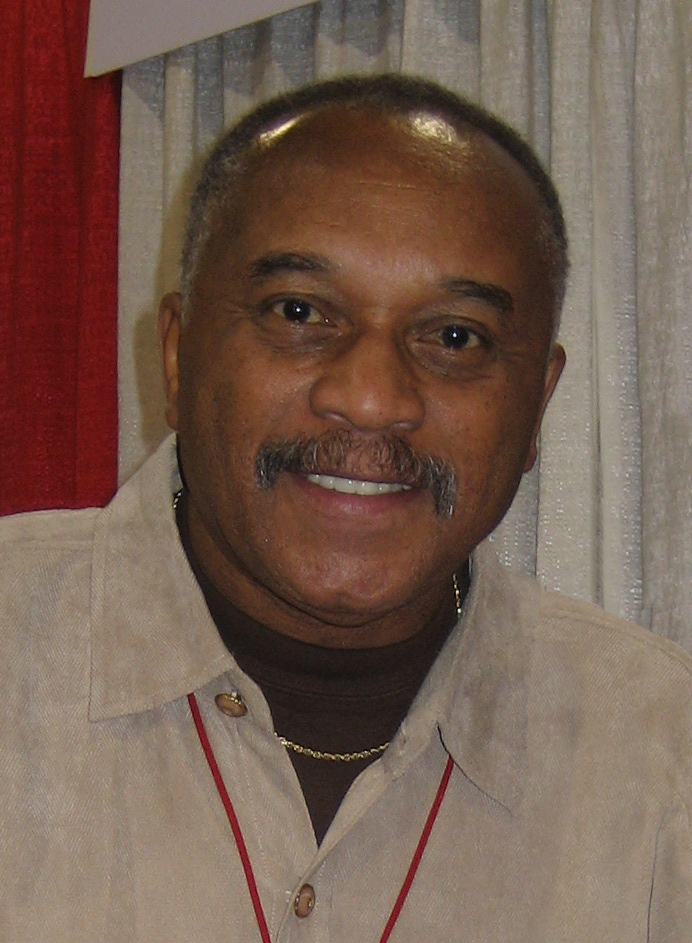
Tommie Smith

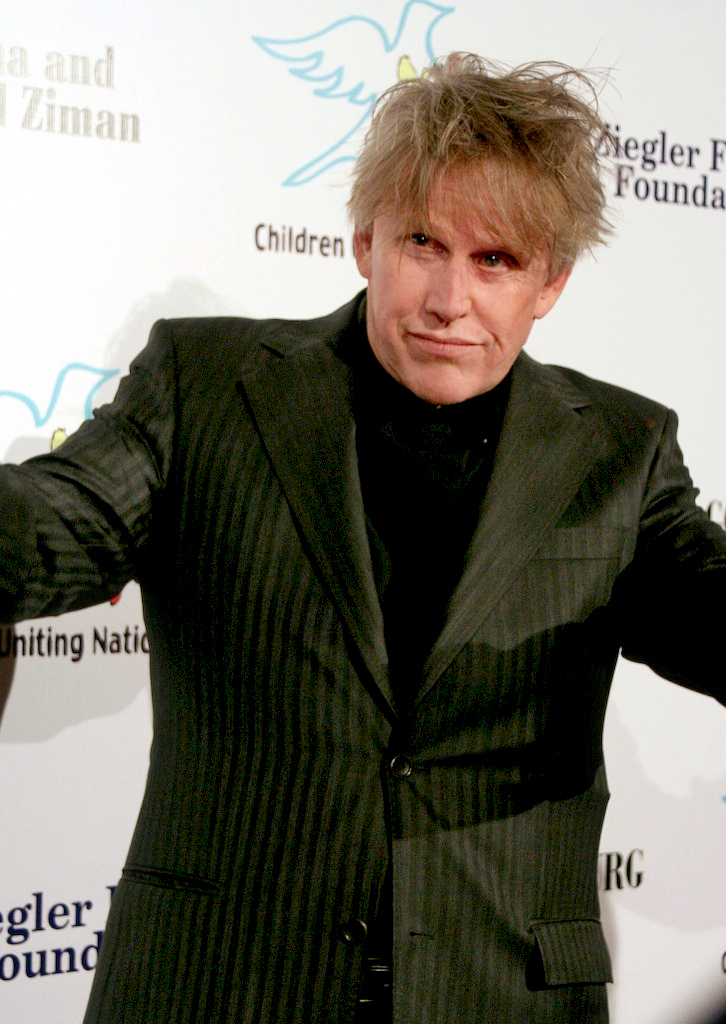
Gary Busey

- June 2
  - Garo Yepremian, American football player (d. 2015)
  - Marvin Hamlisch, American composer, conductor (d. 2012)
- June 3
  - Edith McGuire, American sprinter, Olympic champion (1964)
  - Mary Thom, American journalist and author (d. 2013)
- June 4 – Michelle Phillips, American singer and actress
- June 5 – Whitfield Diffie, American cryptographer
- June 6
  - Bud Harrelson, American baseball player (d. 2024)
  - Phillip Allen Sharp, American geneticist and molecular biologist
  - Tommie Smith, African-American track athlete
- June 8
  - Mark Belanger, American baseball player (d. 1998)
  - Don Grady, American actor and singer (d. 2012)
  - Boz Scaggs, American singer and guitarist
- June 9
  - Roger Bonk, American football player (d. 2023)
  - Wally Gabler, American football player (d. 2025)
- June 17 – Bill Rafferty, American comedian and impressionist (d. 2012)
- June 18
  - Sandy Posey, American musician (d. 2024)
  - Rick Griffin, American artist (d. 1991)
- June 21 – Kenny O'Dell, American country singer-songwriter (d. 2018)
- June 29 – Gary Busey, American actor
- June 30
  - Terry Funk, American professional wrestler (d. 2023)
  - Raymond Moody, American parapsychologist
  - Alan C. Fox, American author, philanthropist and entrepreneur

=== July ===
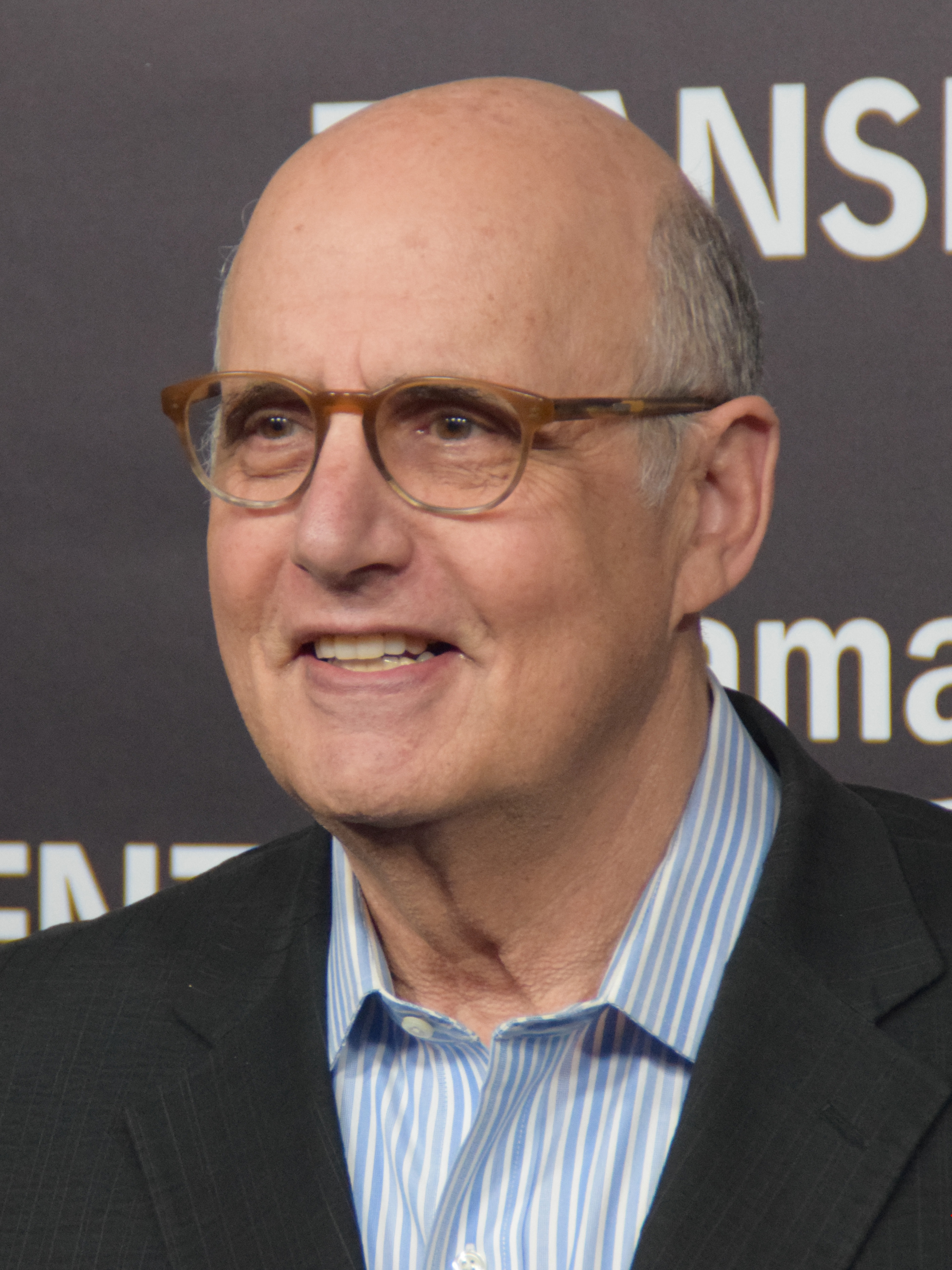
Jeffrey Tambor

- July 1 – Diron Talbert, American football player
- July 2 – Paul Schudel, American football player and coach
- July 8
  - Jaimoe, American drummer (The Allman Brothers Band)
  - Jeffrey Tambor, American actor
- July 16 – Randy Kehler, American political activist (d. 2024)
- July 17 – Tom Kalinske, American businessman
- July 18 – Thomas Markle, American lighting director. father of Meghan Markle
- July 20 – W. Cary Edwards, American politician (d. 2010)
- July 21 – Paul Wellstone, American politician (d. 2002)
- July 26
  - Betty Davis, American singer, songwriter and model (d. 2022)
  - Celeste Yarnall, American actress (d. 2018)
  - Kiel Martin, American actor (d. 1990)
- July 31
  - Geraldine Chaplin, English-American actress
  - Robert C. Merton, American economist

=== August ===
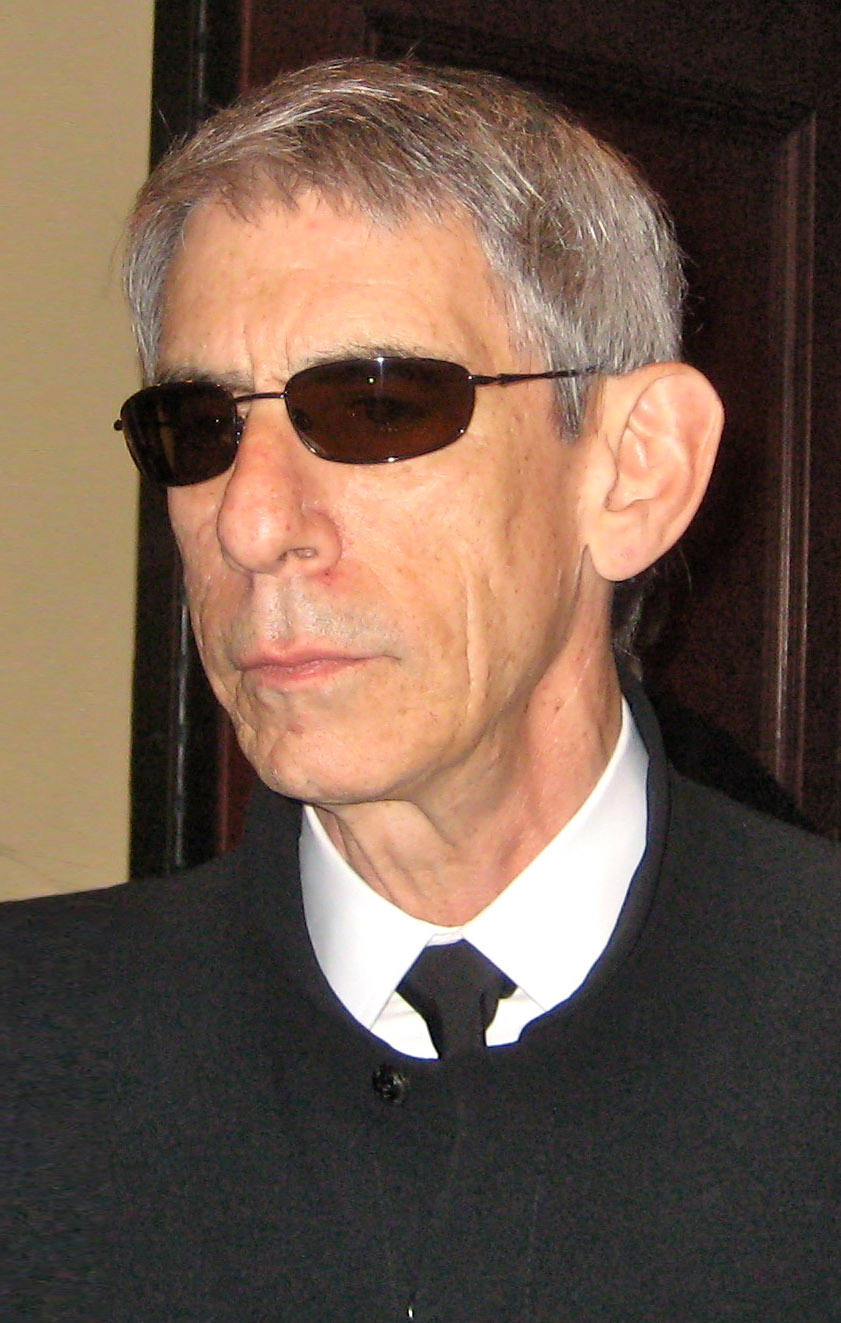
Richard Belzer

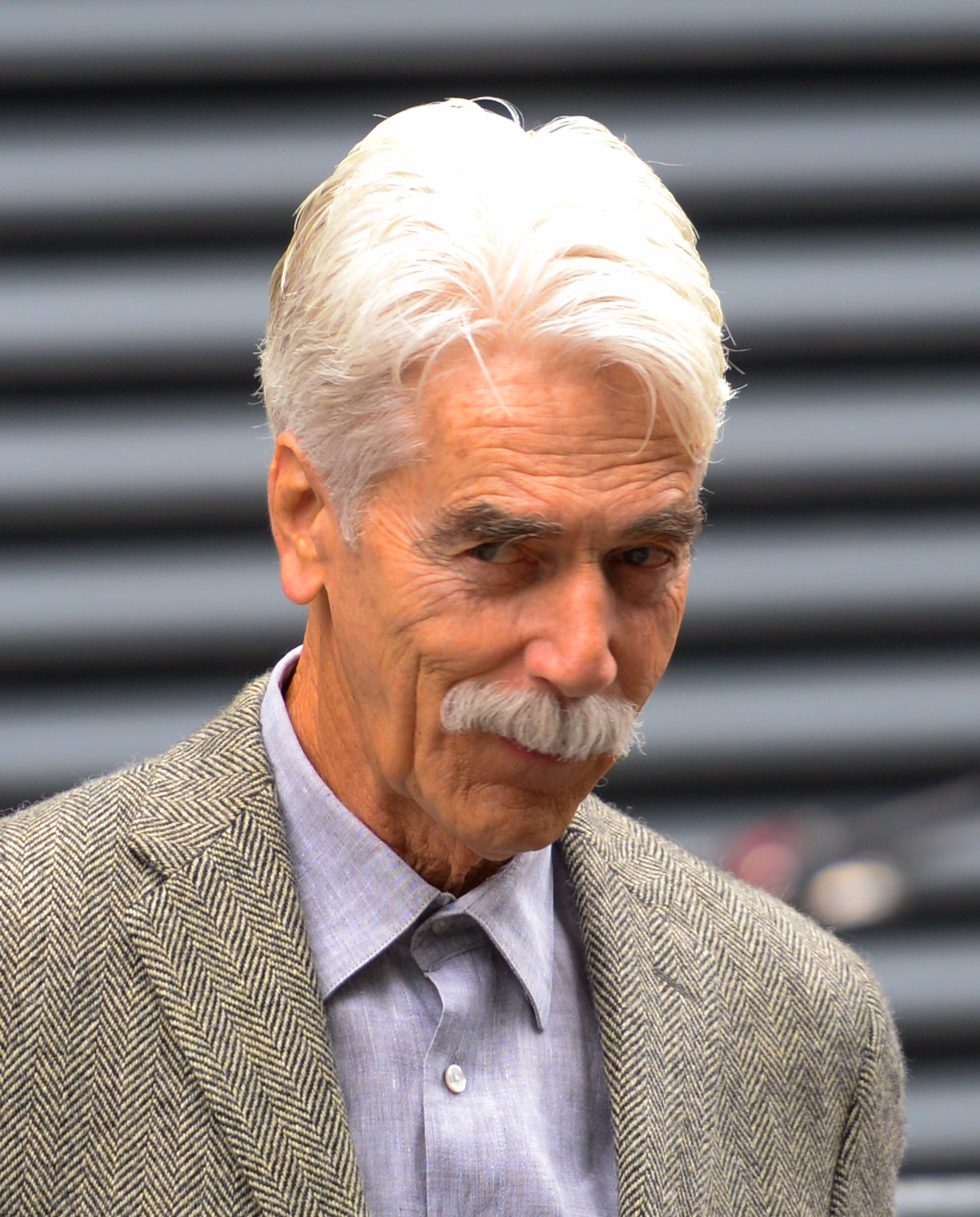
Sam Elliott

- August 4
  - Richard Belzer, American actor and comedian (d. 2023 in France)
  - William Frankfather, American actor (d. 1998)
- August 7
  - Denny Freeman, American guitarist (d. 2021)
  - John Glover, American actor
  - Robert Mueller, American lawyer and FBI director (d. 2026)
- August 8 – Michael Johnson, American singer-songwriter and guitarist (d. 2017)
- August 9 – Sam Elliott, American actor
- August 11 – Frederick W. Smith, American businessman (d. 2025)
- August 13 – Kevin Tighe, American actor
- August 15
  - Linda Ellerbee, American journalist and author
  - Thomas J. Murphy, Jr., American politician, 56th Mayor of Pittsburgh
- August 17 – Larry Ellison, co-founder of Oracle Corporation
- August 19 – Steve Sloan, American football player and coach (d. 2024)
- August 24
  - Henry Braden, American lawyer and politician (d. 2013)
  - Gregory Jarvis, astronaut (d. 1986)
  - Christine Chubbuck, American television reporter (d. 1974)
- August 27 – G. W. Bailey, American actor
- August 28 – Karen Durbin, American journalist and film critic (d. 2025)
- August 30 – Tug McGraw, American baseball player (d. 2004)
- August 31 – Earnie Shavers, African-American professional wrestler (d. 2022)

=== September ===
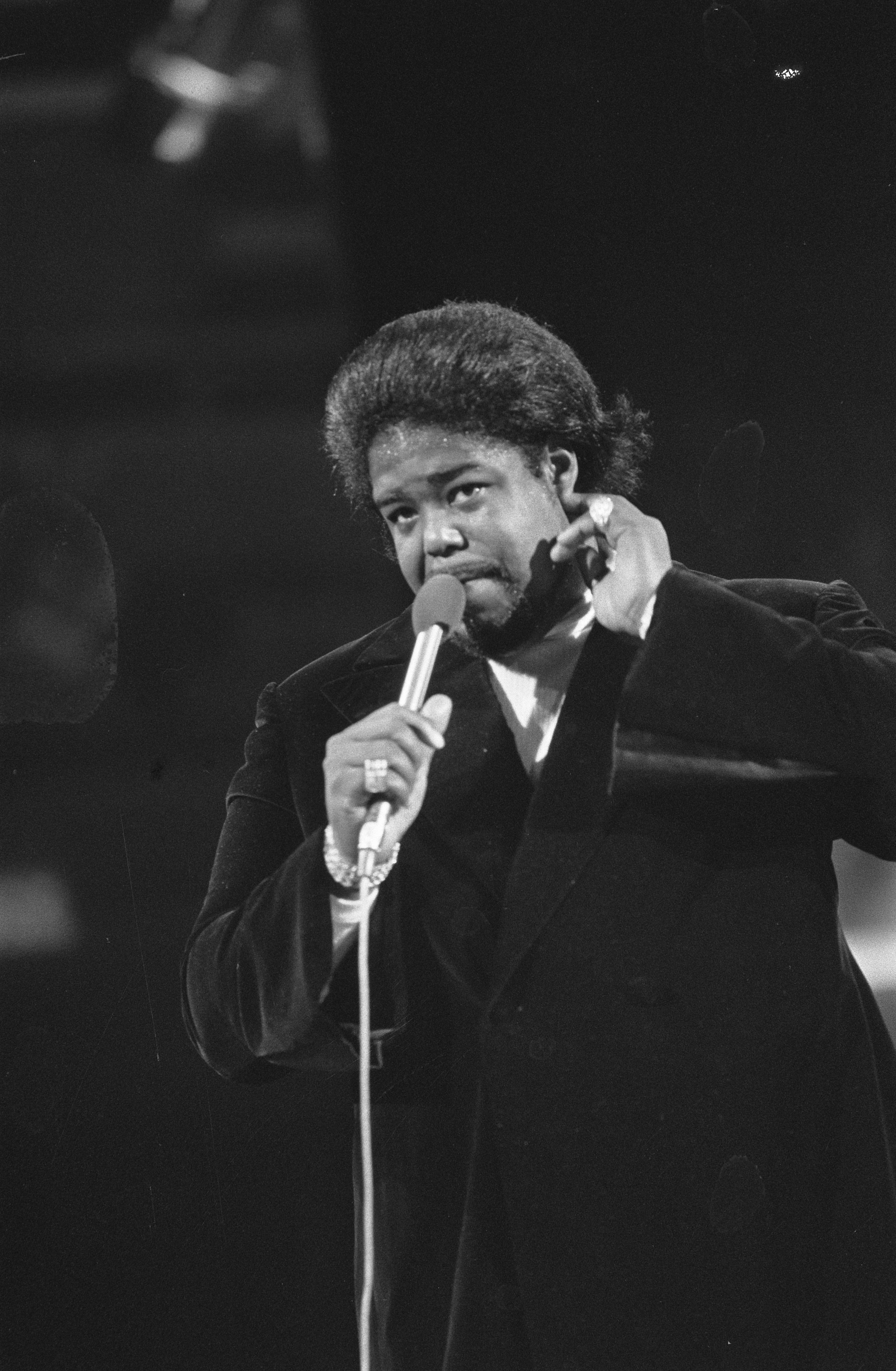
Barry White

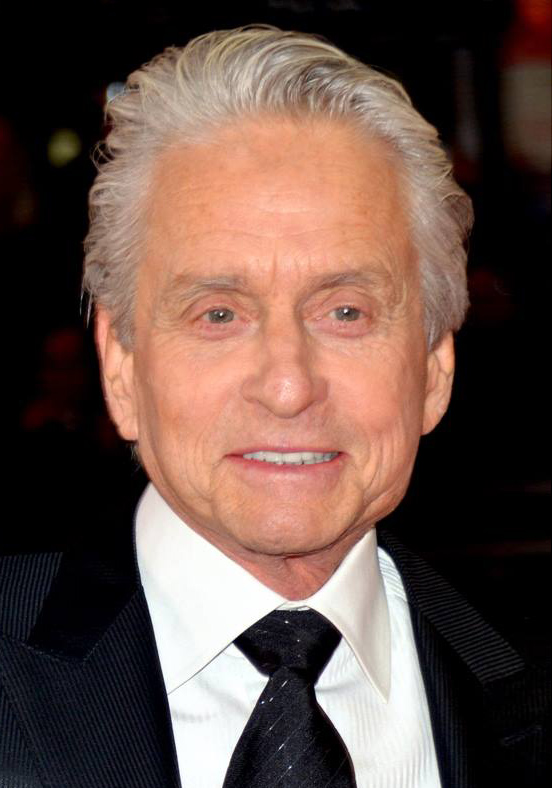
Michael Douglas

- September 1 – Leonard Slatkin, American conductor
- September 3 – Ty Warner, American businessman, inventor of Beanie Babies
- September 7
  - Earl Manigault, American basketball player (d. 1998)
  - Jerry Relph, American politician, member of the Minnesota Senate (d. 2020)
- September 8 – Bill Parkyn, scientist (d. 2012)
- September 12
  - Leonard Peltier, Native American activist and convicted murderer
  - Barry White, African-American R&B and soul singer (d. 2003)
- September 13 – Peter Cetera, lead singer and guitarist of American rock group Chicago
- September 14 – Colleen Barrett, American business executive (d. 2024)
- September 18
  - Bill Cottrell, American football player (d. 2025)
  - Satan's Angel, American exotic dancer (d. 2019)
- September 21
  - Caleb Deschanel, American cinematographer and film director
  - Hamilton Jordan, American politician, 8th White House Chief of Staff (d. 2008)
- September 25 – Michael Douglas, American actor and producer

=== October ===
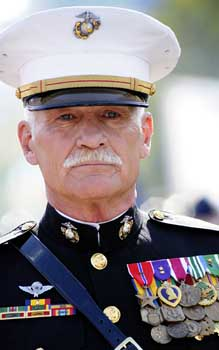
Dale Dye

- October 2 – Vernor Vinge, American science fiction author and mathematician (d. 2024)
- October 3 – Bob Riley, American retired politician and businessman who served as the 52nd governor of Alabama from 2003 to 2011
- October 4 – Tony La Russa, American baseball player and manager
- October 6 – Mylon LeFevre, American singer and evangelist (d. 2023)
- October 8 – Dale Dye, American actor, technical advisor, radio personality and U.S. Marine
- October 9 – Nona Hendryx, American R&B singer (Labelle)
- October 11 – William T. Greenough, American neuroscientist (d. 2013)
- October 13 – Margo Lion, American theatrical producer (d. 2020)
- October 15
  - Mac Collins, American politician (d. 2018)
  - Kay Ivey, American politician
- October 16 – Elizabeth Loftus, American psychologist
- October 19 – George McCrae, American soul and disco singer
- October 28 – Dennis Franz, American actor
- October 31
  - Kinky Friedman, American singer, songwriter, novelist, humorist, politician and columnist (d. 2024)
  - Hal Wick, American politician (d. 2018)

=== November ===
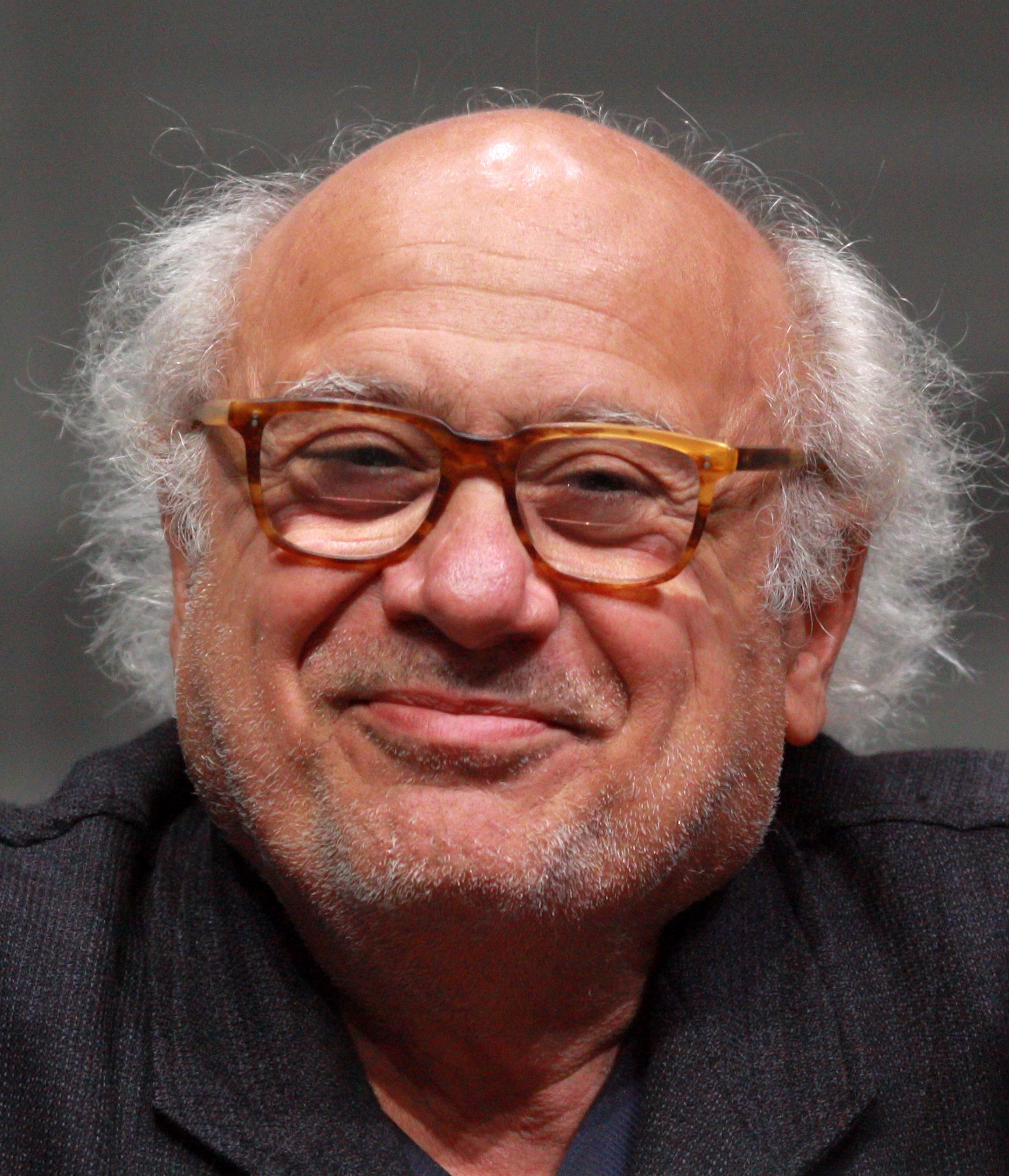
Danny DeVito

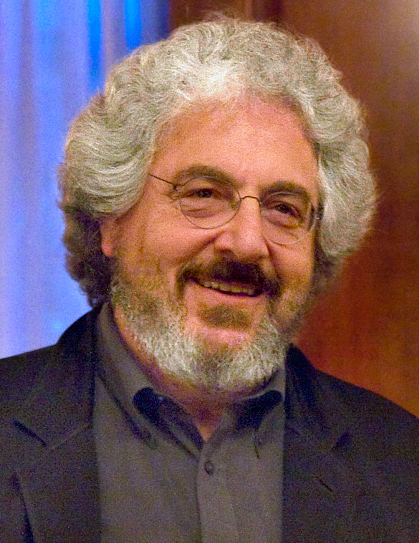
Harold Ramis

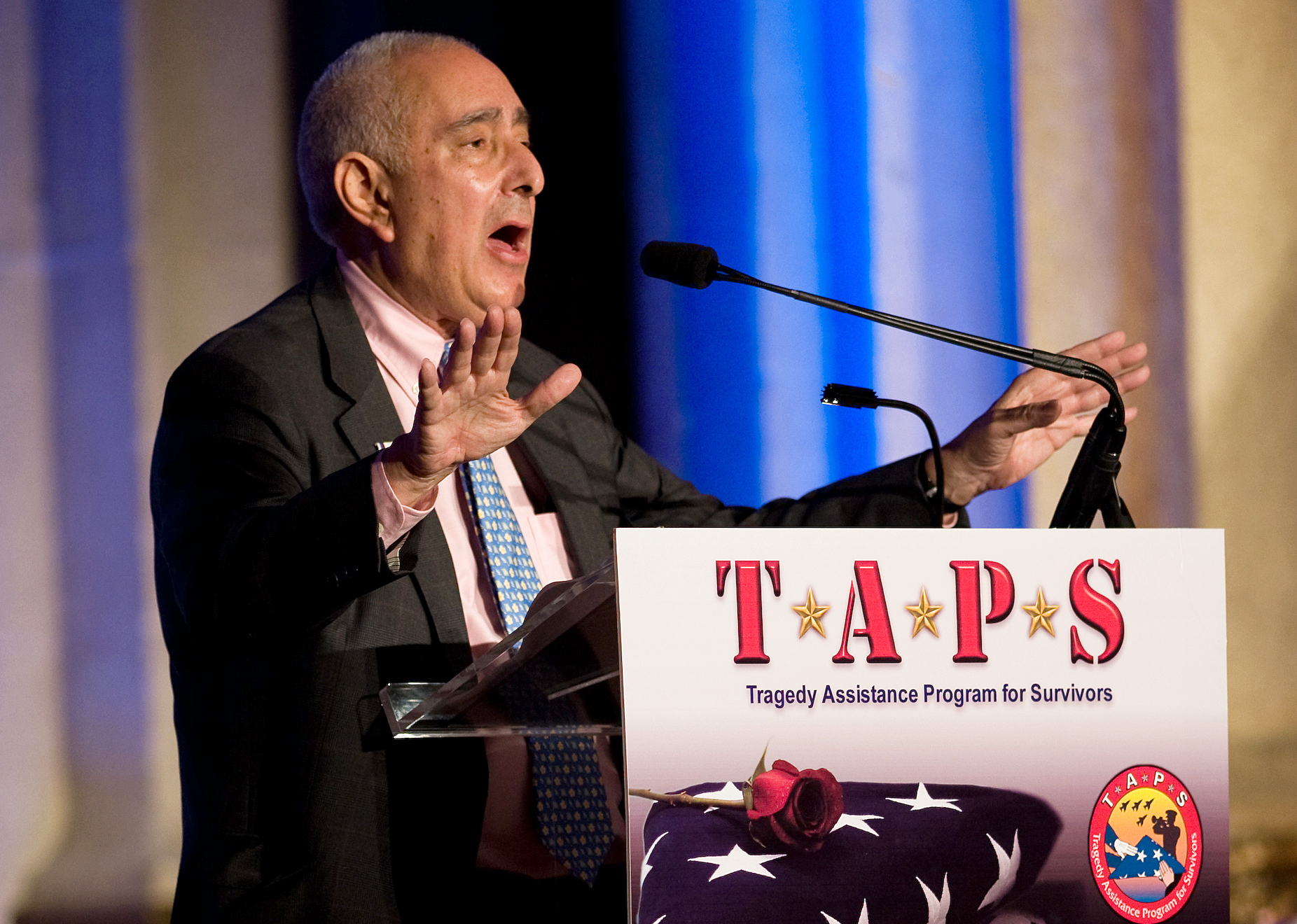
Ben Stein

- November 1
  - Florindo Fabrizio, American politician (d. 2018)
  - Bobby Heenan, American professional wrestling manager and commentator (d. 2017)
- November 2 – Michael Buffer, American ring announcer and actor
- November 3 – Tom Shales, American writer and television critic (d. 2024)
- November 4 – Linda Gary, American voice actress (d. 1995)
- November 5 – Leland Wilkinson, American statistician and computer scientist (d. 2021)
- November 7 – Joe Niekro, American baseball player (d. 2006)
- November 10 – Silvestre Reyes, American politician
- November 12
  - Booker T. Jones, African-American musician, singer and songwriter
  - Al Michaels, American sportscaster
- November 17
  - Jim Boeheim, American basketball player and coach
  - Gene Clark, American singer-songwriter (d. 1991)
  - Danny DeVito, American actor, film producer and director
  - Gary Goldman, American animator, film producer and director
  - Tom Seaver, American baseball player (d. 2020)
  - Sammy Younge Jr., American civil rights activist (d. 1966)
- November 18
  - Lorinda Cherry, American computer scientist (d. 2022)
  - Ed Krupp, American astronomer, Director of the Griffith Observatory and science popularizer
- November 20 – Donald DiFrancesco, American lawyer and politician, 51st Governor of New Jersey
- November 21
  - Dick Durbin, American politician
  - Harold Ramis, American actor, director and comedy writer (d. 2014)
- November 24 – Candy Darling, American actress (d. 1974)
- November 25 – Ben Stein, American law professor, actor and author
- November 27 – Mickey Leland, American politician (d. 1989)
- November 28 – Rita Mae Brown, American fiction writer and political activist
- November 30 - Dian Parkinson, former model

=== December ===
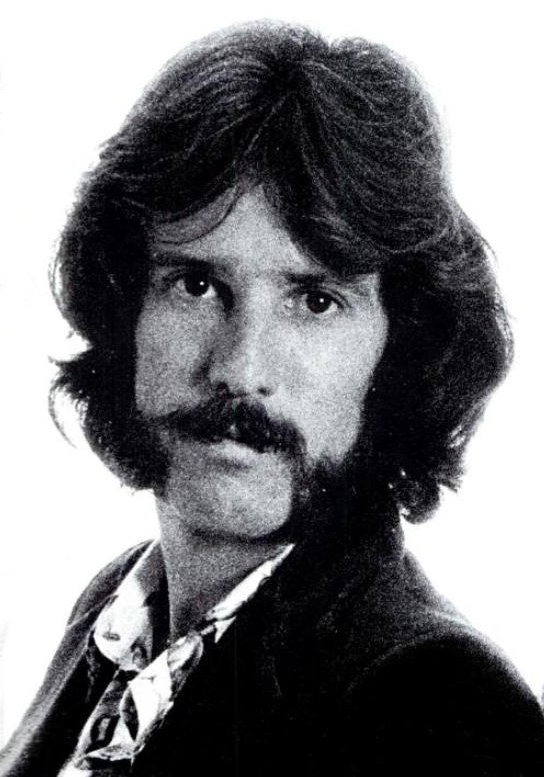
John Densmore

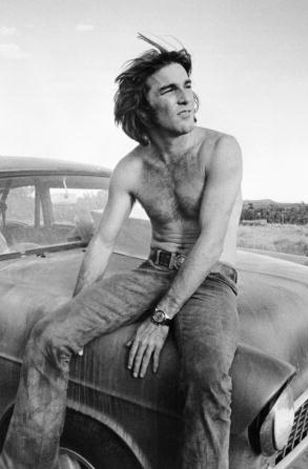
Dennis Wilson

- December 1 – John Densmore, American drummer, member of The Doors.
- December 2 – Cathy Lee Crosby, American actress (That's Incredible!)
- December 4 – Dennis Wilson, American drummer (The Beach Boys) (d. 1983)
- December 6
  - Kit Culkin, American stage actor
  - Ron Kenoly, American Christian leader
- December 7 – Daniel Chorzempa, American organist (d. 2023)
- December 9 – Ki Longfellow, American novelist (d. 2022)
- December 11
  - Teri Garr, American actress (d. 2024)
  - Lynda Day George, American actress
  - Brenda Lee, American singer
- December 19 – Tim Reid, African-American actor and film director
- December 20 – Bobby Colomby, American drummer and producer
- December 21 – Michael Tilson Thomas, American conductor (d. 2026)
- December 22 – Steve Carlton, American baseball player
- December 23 – Wesley Clark, U.S. general and NATO Supreme Allied Commander
- December 26 – Bill Ayers, American education theorist and former radical anti-war activist
- December 28
  - Johnny Isakson, American politician (d. 2021)
  - Kary Mullis, American biochemist (d. 2019)
- December 30 – Joseph Hilbe, American statistician and author
- December 31 – Lois Galgay Reckitt, American activist and politician (d. 2023)

=== Undated ===
- Donald Nicolaisen, American SEC chief accountant (d. 2019)

== Deaths ==
- January 6 – Ida Tarbell, investigative journalist (b. 1857)
- January 7 – Lou Henry Hoover, wife of Herbert Hoover, First Lady of the United States (b. 1874)
- March 7 – August Busck, entomologist and author of works on microlepidoptera (b. 1870 in Denmark)
- March 11 – Irvin S. Cobb, writer (b. 1876)
- March 19 – Henry Francis Bryan, governor of American Samoa (b. 1865)
- April 21 – Florence Trail, educator and author (b. 1854)
- April 25 – George Herriman, cartoonist (Krazy Kat) (b. 1880)
- May 8 – Albert Leo Stevens, balloonist (b. 1877)
- May 23 – Thomas Curtis, hurdler (b. 1873)
- June 16 - George Stinney, African-American boy wrongfully convicted of murder (b. 1929)
- June 30 – Georgia Hopley, journalist, political figure and temperance advocate (b. 1858)
- August 12 – Joseph P. Kennedy Jr., U.S. Navy lieutenant (b. 1915; k. in action)
- September 26 – John Sheridan Weller, attorney and politician (b. 1866)
- September 27 – Aimee Semple McPherson, Pentecostal evangelist (b. 1890 in Canada)
- October 4 – Al Smith, politician (b. 1873)
- October 21 – Lionel Pape, actor (b. 1877)
- October 22 – Richard Bennett, stage and silent screen actor (b. 1870)
- November 2 – Thomas Midgley Jr., mechanical and chemical engineer (b. 1889)
- November 4 – Sir John Dill, British Army field marshal (b. 1881 in Ireland)
- November 9
  - Jane Grey, actress (b. 1883)
  - Frank Marshall, chess player (b. 1877)
- November 12 – George Houston, actor (b. 1896)
- November 26 – Florence Foster Jenkins, socialite and amateur soprano (b. 1868)
- December 4
  - Grace Denio Litchfield, poet and novelist (b. 1849)
  - Benjamin Wistar Morris, architect (b. 1870)
  - Georgiana Simpson, African American philologist (b. 1865)
- December 15 - Glenn Miller, conductor, trombonist (b. 1904)
- December 16 – Stuart Paton, British-born screenwriter and film director (b. 1883)
- December 21 – James Redmond, artist, killed in action in Belgium (b. 1901)
- December 31 – Ruth Hanna McCormick, politician, activist and publisher (b. 1880)

== See also ==
- List of American films of 1944
- Timeline of United States history (1930–1949)
- Timeline of World War II
