= Al Dodd =

American football player (1945–1987)

No. 23, 25, 41
- Positions: Wide receiver, Cornerback

Personal information
- Born: August 21, 1945; New Orleans, Louisiana, U.S.
- Died: April 9, 1987 (aged 41); Opelika, Alabama, U.S.
- Listed height: 6 ft 0 in (1.83 m)
- Listed weight: 185 lb (84 kg)

Career information
- High school: West Jefferson (Harvey, Louisiana)
- College: Northwestern State
- NFL draft: 1967: 4th round, 90th overall pick

Career history
- Chicago Bears (1967); New Orleans Saints (1969–1971); Atlanta Falcons (1973–1974); Miami Dolphins (1975)*
- * Offseason or practice squad member only

Awards and highlights
- First-team Little All-American (1966)

Career NFL statistics
- Receptions: 111
- Receiving yards: 1,803
- Receiving touchdowns: 3
- Stats at Pro Football Reference

Alvin Roy Dodd (August 21, 1945 – April 9, 1987) was an American professional football player who played as a wide receiver and cornerback for six seasons for the Chicago Bears, New Orleans Saints, and Atlanta Falcons.

== College career ==
Recruited out of West Jefferson High School, Al Dodd played his college ball at Northwestern State. While at Northwestern State, Dodd led the school in kick off return yards from 1964 to 1966. In addition to playing safety, Dodd also played tailback and receiver for the school as well. When his college career was over, he 31 career interceptions.

== Pro Career ==
The Chicago Bears selected Dodd in the fourth round of the 1967 NFL draft. Dodd was with the team six weeks before he was released. After spending the 1968 season out of the NFL, Dodd signed with the New Orleans Saints. Saints head coach Tom Fears converted Dodd into a receiver. Dodd and Danny Abramowicz became the top receiving targets for quarterback Billy Kilmer. Dodd and Abramowicz were the highlights of what proved to be a dismal season for the Saints. Fears was fired after posting a 1-5-1 record, and J.D. Roberts took over. Kilmer split time with Edd Hargett at quarterback, and the young Hargett wasn't ready for the big stage, losing every one of his starts. The instability at quarterback didn't bold well for the Saints chances next season. Kilmer was traded away to the Washington Redskins, and Hargett traded the starting role back and forth with Archie Manning. However, Dodd still posted decent numbers in his final season in New Orleans, catching 15 passes for 298 yards.

Dodd spent another season out of the NFL and returned in 1973 with the Atlanta Falcons. Playing Norm Van Brocklin, Dodd started 10 games for Atlanta, and hooked up with Falcons quarterback Bob Lee, posting 19 receptions for 291 yards. In 1974, his final season in the NFL, Dodd split his time between returning punts and playing receiver. He caught 12 passes for 130 yards and a touchdown.

== Highlights and Awards ==
In 1980, Dodd was inducted into the Northwestern State Athletic Hall of Fame. His number 41 was retired by the football team one of only five retired by the program. And in 2007, Dodd was honored again, as he was named to the all-time Northwestern State football team.
