= Lee White (American football) =

American football player (born 1946)

No. 34, 44, 38
- Position: Running back

Personal information
- Born: May 9, 1946 (age 80); Las Vegas, Nevada, U.S.
- Listed height: 6 ft 2 in (1.88 m)
- Listed weight: 232 lb (105 kg)

Career information
- High school: Las Vegas
- College: Weber State
- NFL draft: 1968: 1st round, 17th overall pick

Career history
- New York Jets (1968–1970); Los Angeles Rams (1971); San Diego Chargers (1972)

Awards and highlights
- Super Bowl champion (III); AFL champion (1968); First-team Little All-American (1967)

Career NFL/AFL statistics
- Rushing yards: 389
- Rushing average: 3.2
- Receptions: 16
- Receiving yards: 143
- Total touchdowns: 1
- Stats at Pro Football Reference

Lee Andrew White (born May 9, 1946) is an American former professional football player who was a running back in the American Football League (NFL) and National Football League (NFL). After playing college football for the Weber State Wildcats, he joined the New York Jets as the 17th pick in the first round of the 1968 NFL/AFL draft. He was on the Jets' roster for the 1968 AFL championship victory over the Oakland Raiders, and for the third AFL-NFL World Championship game, in which the AFL's Jets defeated the NFL's champion Baltimore Colts.

White played for the Jets for four years, until he was traded to the NFL's Los Angeles Rams. With the Rams he played several games, but found it hard to settle into the area.

White was traded along with Deacon Jones and Greg Wojcik from the Rams to the San Diego Chargers for Jeff Staggs, a second rounder in 1972 (30th overall–Jim Bertelsen) and a second and third rounder in 1973 (31st and 60th overall–Cullen Bryant and Tim Stokes respectively) on January 29, 1972. He retired in 1973.

== See also ==
- List of American Football League players
