= Ken Frith =

Canadian football player (born 1945)

Profile
- Positions: Defensive end, Defensive tackle

Personal information
- Born: December 1, 1945 (age 80); Lake Providence, Louisiana, U.S.
- Listed height: 6 ft 4 in (1.93 m)
- Listed weight: 252 lb (114 kg)

Career information
- College: Northeast Louisiana
- NFL draft: 1971: 6th round, 156th overall pick

Career history
- 1969–1971: Saskatchewan Roughriders

Awards and highlights
- CFL West All-Star (1970); Second-team Little All-American (1968)

Kenneth Frith (born December 1, 1945) is an American-born Canadian football player who played professionally for the Saskatchewan Roughriders.
