= Tim Buchanan (American football) =

American football player (born 1946)

- Buchanan in 1968

No. 52
- Position: Linebacker

Personal information
- Born: May 26, 1946 (age 80); Pasadena, California, U.S.
- Listed height: 6 ft 1 in (1.85 m)
- Listed weight: 230 lb (104 kg)

Career information
- High school: John Muir (Pasadena)
- College: Arizona State (1965-1967); Hawaii (1968)
- NFL draft: 1969: 8th round, 187th overall pick

Career history
- Cincinnati Bengals (1969)

Awards and highlights
- First-team Little All-American (1968); Hula Bowl MVP (1969)

Career AFL statistics
- Games played: 14
- Stats at Pro Football Reference

Timothy Buchanan (born May 26, 1946) is an American former professional football player who was a linebacker for the Cincinnati Bengals of the National Football League (NFL). He played college football for the Hawaii Rainbow Warriors and played for the Bengals for one season as a backup for Bill Bergey.

== Early life ==
Buchanan was born on May 26, 1946 in Pasadena, California. He is the older brother of Dave Buchanan. He graduated from John Muir High School in 1965. While in high school he primarily played as an offensive guard and defensive tackle, but shifted to the linebacker position in his senior year.

== Career ==
=== College career ===
Buchanan played college football for the Arizona State Sun Devils from 1965 to 1967, where he wore number #51. Dissatisfied with the coaching at Arizona State, Buchanan transferred to the Hawaii Rainbow Warriors for the 1968 season. He has the third-most tackles in a single season in the team's history, with 148 tackles in 1968. He is also tied for second-most tackles in a single game with Blane Gaison and Dave Jaworsky, set in a game against the University of California on November 30, 1968. He was a first-team Little All-America linebacker in 1968 and participated in the Hula Bowl in 1969, where he was named MVP.

He also played basketball in college.

=== Professional career ===
Buchanan was drafted in the eighth round of the 1969 NFL/AFL draft by the Cincinnati Bengals. He played as a backup to Bill Bergey. He was released by the Bengals on July 16, 1970, with head coach Paul Brown citing a "failure to perform" as the reason. He was claimed by the Cleveland Browns as a free agent, but they cut him from their roster a month later.

== Personal life ==
Buchanan majored in elementary education.
