= 1967 Little All-America college football team =

American college football all-star team

The 1967 Little All-America college football team is composed of college football players from small colleges and universities who were selected by the Associated Press (AP) as the best players at each position. For 1967, the AP selected two teams, each team having separate offensive and defensive platoons.

== First team ==
Position	Player	Team
Offense
QB	Charles McKee	Lawrence
HB	Don Haas	Montana State
HB	Carl Garrett	New Mexico Highlands
FB	Lee White	Weber State
E	Haven Moses	San Diego State
E	Dwayne Nix	Texas A&I
T	Eddie Joyner	Lenoir–Rhyne
T	John Gloisten	Wagner
G	Spergon Wynn	Lamar Tech
G	Leland Hughes	Delta State
C	Victor Bender	Northeast Louisiana
Defense
DE	William Hanna	Northern Arizona
DE	Jeff Queen	Morgan State
DT	Claude Humphrey	Tennessee A&I
DT	Dave Williams	Fairmont State
MG	Ray Pedersen	Northern Iowa
LB	Robert Beers	Montana
LB	David Ragusa	Rochester
LB	Richard Jaeger	Gustavus Adolphus
CB	Major Hazelton	Florida A&M
CB	Steve Dockery	Maryville (TN)
S	Robert Willbanks	Arlington State

== Second team ==
Position	Player	Team
Offense
QB	Bob Toledo	San Francisco State
HB	Doug VanBoven	Central (IA)
HB	Lennie Holton	Northern Michigan
FB	Richard Moore	Western Kentucky
E	Aaron Marsh	Eastern Kentucky
E	Henry McKay	Guilford
T	Mike Donovan	Northeastern
T	Bob Deim	Arlington State
G	Tom Funches	Jacksonville State
G	Willie Banks	Alcorn A&M
C	James Lietzki	Mankato State
Defense
DE	Alfred Beauchamp	Southern
DE	Joe Hornak	Waynesburg
DT	Marvin Upshaw	Trinity (TX)
DT	Art Shell	Maryland State
MG	Mike Tomasini	Colorado State
LB	Gary Jones	Whitman
LB	Herbert Cooper	Wesleyan (CT)
CB	Mac Sauls	Southwest Texas State
CB	Lou Ciccone	Glassboro State
S	Mike Johnston	Alfred

== See also ==
- 1967 College Football All-America Team
