= Darwin Gonnerman =

American gridiron football player (1947–2015)

Profile
- Position: Running back

Personal information
- Born: January 3, 1947; Rock County, Minnesota, U.S.
- Died: February 7, 2015 (aged 68); New Braunfels, Texas, U.S.
- Listed height: 5 ft 11 in (1.80 m)
- Listed weight: 200 lb (91 kg)

Career information
- College: South Dakota State

Career history
- 1969: Winnipeg Blue Bombers
- 1969: Ottawa Rough Riders
- 1970: Edmonton Eskimos

Awards and highlights
- Grey Cup champion (1969); Second-team Little All-American (1968)

Darwin Lynn "Go Go" Gonnerman (January 3, 1947 – February 7, 2015) was an American professional football player who played for the Winnipeg Blue Bombers, Ottawa Rough Riders and Edmonton Eskimos. He won the Grey Cup in 1969 with Ottawa. He previously played college football at South Dakota State University. He died after a brief hospitalization in 2015.
