= Roger Bonk =

American gridiron football player (1944–2023)

No. 52
- Position: Linebacker

Personal information
- Born: June 9, 1944; Chippewa County, Minnesota, U.S.
- Died: February 13, 2023 (aged 78); Clovis, California, U.S.
- Listed height: 5 ft 11 in (1.80 m)
- Listed weight: 230 lb (104 kg)

Career information
- High school: Appleton (MN)
- College: Minnesota (1962); North Dakota (1964–1966)

Career history
- 1967–1968: Winnipeg Blue Bombers

Awards and highlights
- First-team Little All-American (1966); North Dakota Athletic Hall of Fame (1983)

Career statistics
- Games played: 15
- Interceptions: 1
- Int. ret. yards: 14
- Fumble recoveries: 1

Roger Franklin Bonk (June 9, 1944 – February 13, 2023) was an American professional football player who was a linebacker for one season in the Canadian Football League (CFL) for the Winnipeg Blue Bombers. A native of Minnesota, he played freshman football for the Minnesota Golden Gophers in 1962 before transferring to the University of North Dakota. He played three years for their football team and was twice named all-conference, additionally being named first-team Little All-American as a senior. Bonk then played 15 games for Winnipeg in 1967 before being released prior to the 1968 season.

== Early life and education ==
Bonk was born on June 9, 1944, in Chippewa County, Minnesota. He had seven siblings, all sisters, and was a member of a farming family. Bonk went to elementary school in Danvers and later attended Appleton High School, at which he played football, wrestling, and track. As a senior, Bonk was named first-team all-state by the Star Tribune in football and also earned all-state honors in track and wrestling. His position with Appleton in football was middle guard.

After graduating from Appleton in 1962, Bonk played freshman football for the Minnesota Golden Gophers. Although he was considered one of their "brightest prospects" as a sophomore in 1963, he announced that he was dropping out before the season started. Afterwards, Bonk transferred to the University of North Dakota.

Bonk went on to play three seasons for North Dakota, and was described as "unquestionably an outstanding leader and premier football performer." Playing offensive guard and linebacker, he twice was named all-conference and in his final year was one of their captains. As a senior in 1966, Bonk was named first-team Little All-American after averaging 11 solo tackles per game. Nicknamed "The Boinker," he also was named the team's most outstanding lineman and was later inducted into their hall of fame. Bonk graduated with a degree in business.

== Professional career ==
Bonk was signed by the Winnipeg Blue Bombers of the Canadian Football League (CFL) in April 1967. He became a starter at linebacker early in the season, and finished the year having appeared in all but one of their 16 games. He posted one interception, a return of 14 yards, and also recorded one fumble recovery as well as two kickoff returns for 29 yards. Bonk was released by the Blue Bombers in July 1968.

== Later life and death ==
After finishing his football career, Bonk moved to California and worked at Sears for a time, before starting a swimming pool business, which he ran for over 40 years. He also was a youth football coach. He was inducted into the University of North Dakota Athletic Hall of Fame in 1983. Bonk died on February 13, 2023, in Clovis, California, at age 78.
