= 1966 Little All-America college football team =

American college football all-star team

The 1966 Little All-America college football team is composed of college football players from small colleges and universities who were selected by the Associated Press (AP) as the best players at each position. For 1966, the AP selected two teams, each team having separate offensive and defensive platoons.

Halfback Carl Garrett of New Mexico Highlands received first-team honors as a sophomore. He received the same honor again in 1967 and 1968 and went on to be named AFL Rookie of the Year in 1969.

Dwayne Nix of Texas A&I won first-team honors at offensive end and was later inducted into the College Football Hall of Fame.

Linebacker John Huard of Maine also received first-team honor and was later inducted into the College Football Hall of Fame. He was the first player form the University of Maine to be inducted.

== First team ==
Position	Player	Team
Offense
QB	Donald Horn	San Diego
HB	Carl Garrett	New Mexico Highlands
HB	Donald Haas	Montana State
FB	John Ogles	Austin Peay
E	Joseph Peyton	Puget Sound
E	Dwayne Nix	Texas A&I
T	Herbert Slattery	Delaware
T	Fred Davis	Doane
G	Harry Sorrell	Chattanooga
G	William Stringer	Southwest Missouri State
C	David Edmondson	Cal Poly
Defense
DE	Ronald McCall	Weber State
DE	Joseph Egresitz	Gettysburg
DT	Kenneth Ozee	Arkansas State
DT	Mark DeVilling	Muskingum
MG	Walter Odegaard	North Dakota State
LB	Dick Ries	Northern Arizona
LB	John Huard	Maine
LB	Roger Bonk	North Dakota
DB	Ray Vinson	Jacksonville State
DB	Al Dodd	Northwestern State
DB	Mel Thake	Superior State

== Second team ==
Position	Player	Team
Offense
QB	Bob Berezowitz	Whitewater State
HB	Terry Gwin	Arkansas State
HB	Michael Love	Abilene Christian
FB	Robert Mitchell	Vermont
E	Donald Larson	Minnesota–Duluth
E	Larry Fowler	Hillsdale
T	Paul Maczuzak	Bucknell
T	Edward Joyner	Lenoir–Rhyne
G	Curtis Marker	Northern Michigan
G	Terry Pitts	Fresno State
C	Al DuBouis	Franklin & Marshall
Defense
DE	Claude Humphrey	Tennessee A&I
DE	Leo Carroll	San Diego
DT	Thomas Sears	Georgetown (KY)
DT	Don Williams	Wofford
MG	LeRoy Gray	East Tennessee State
LB	Thomas McNeil	Waynesburg
LB	Jeff Stagg	San Diego
LB	David Ragusa	Rochester
DB	Alfred Avila	Sul Ross
DB	Louis Pfaadt	Eastern Kentucky
DB	Paul Wallerga	Santa Clara

== See also ==
- 1966 College Football All-America Team
