= Dwayne Nix =

American football player (born 1946)

No. 82
- Position: Tight end

Personal information
- Born: October 10, 1946 (age 80); Kingsville, Texas, U.S.
- Listed height: 6 ft 0 in (1.83 m)
- Listed weight: 185 lb (84 kg)

Career information
- High school: King (Kingsville, Texas)
- College: Texas A&I (1965–1968)

Awards and highlights
- First-team Little All-American (1966, 1968)
- College Football Hall of Fame (Class of 2003)

Dwayne Nix (born October 10, 1946) is an American former college football player and United States Marine Corps officer. He was elected to the College Football Hall of Fame in 2003. He played in the National Association of Intercollegiate Athletics championship game.

Nix played for the Texas A&M Kingsville Javelinas and was named to the Associated Press Little All-America squads three times, in 1966, 1967 and 1968.

After graduation, he served in the United States Marine Corps as a helicopter pilot, in the Vietnam War, initially flying Bell UH-1 Hueys. In 1974 he went to work for Bell Helicopter and later NAVAIR in Iran, before being evacuated in 1979. That year he was named to the Kingsville Javelina Hall of Fame.

In 1981 he returned to the Marine Corps.

Nix remained with the Marine Corps as a reserve officer for 23 years, serving in the Gulf War during that time. In 2003, Nix retired from the Marine Corps reserves as a colonel where he served as the Assistant Deputy Director, Operations Division in the Plans, Programs and Operations Department at Marine Corps Headquarters in Washington, D.C.

In 2016, Nix was named to the Lone Star Conference Hall of Honor.
