= Claude Humphrey =

American football player and coach (1944–2021)

- Humphrey in 1972

No. 87
- Position: Defensive end

Personal information
- Born: June 29, 1944; Memphis, Tennessee, U.S.
- Died: December 3, 2021 (aged 77); Memphis, Tennessee, U.S.
- Listed height: 6 ft 4 in (1.93 m)
- Listed weight: 252 lb (114 kg)

Career information
- High school: Lester (Memphis)
- College: Tennessee A&I (1964–1967)
- NFL draft: 1968: 1st round, 3rd overall pick

Career history
- Atlanta Falcons (1968–1978); Philadelphia Eagles (1979–1981)

Awards and highlights
- NFL Defensive Rookie of the Year (1968); 5× First-team All-Pro (1971–1974, 1977); 3× Second-team All-Pro (1969, 1970, 1976); 6× Pro Bowl (1970–1974, 1977); Atlanta Falcons Ring of Honor; First-team Little All-American (1967)

Career NFL statistics
- Fumble recoveries: 11
- Interceptions: 2
- Touchdowns: 1
- Sacks: 130
- Stats at Pro Football Reference
- Pro Football Hall of Fame

Claude B. Humphrey (June 29, 1944 – December 3, 2021) was an American professional football player who played as a defensive end in the National Football League (NFL) for the Atlanta Falcons and Philadelphia Eagles. Humphrey was inducted into the Pro Football Hall of Fame in 2014. He played college football for the Tennessee A&I Tigers.

== Early life ==
Humphrey was born on June 29, 1944, in Memphis, to Dosie and Millie (Mays) Humphrey. He grew up in a "shotgun house". He attended Lester High School in Memphis. Humphrey played football, basketball, ran the low hurdles and excelled in the shot put in high school. He held the Tennessee high school record in the shot put for almost four decades. His high school basketball team finished as state runners-up twice.

== College career ==
Humphrey attended Tennessee State University (TSU), an Historically Black College and University (HBCU) in Nashville. He played varsity football from 1965-67 under coach John Merritt. As a freshman (1964), he came in as an offensive tackle, but was switched to defensive tackle. As a defensive tackle, he became a two- or three-time All-American. Tennessee State was twice HBCU national champion with Humphrey, winning the Grantland Rice Bowl in 1965 and 1966; while achieving an overall 35–3–1 record during his tenure. Humphrey's 39 sacks were a school record at the time of his graduation, and this still ranked fifth at the time of his death.

Humphrey played in four college all star games: the Senior Bowl, the Blue-Gray Game, the Coaches All-American Game and the College All-Star game. In 1967, the Associated Press (AP) named him a first-team Little All-American, and he was named an All-American by The Pittsburgh Courier, The Sporting News, and Time Magazine.

Humphrey was a member of Phi Beta Sigma.

== Professional career ==
Humphrey was drafted out of Tennessee State University in the first round of the 1968 NFL draft with the third overall choice by the Falcons. He had been well prepared as a defensive lineman at TSU by coach Merritt and defensive coordinator Joe Gilliam Sr. In his Falcons' rookie year (1968), Humphrey started every game, had 11.5 sacks, recovered three fumbles, and was named the NFL's Defensive Rookie of the Year.

Even after an excellent rookie season, Humphrey knew he had to expand his technique and skill set to continue his success in the NFL. He credited the Falcons' new 1969 defensive coordinator, Marion Campbell, with helping him branch out to obtain that knowledge, leading to his continued success. In 1969, he had 10 or 10.5 sacks, without any signs of a "sophomore slump"; being named second-team All-Pro by the AP and Newspaper Enterprise Association (NEA).

Quarterback sacks did not become an official NFL statistic until 1982, after Humphrey retired, but retrospective film study of his games gave him 130 unofficial sacks in his career. Following his sophomore NFL season, he had 10 sacks in 1970 and 13 in 1971 for the Falcons. Humphrey would have double digit sacks in three of the next five full seasons he played for the Falcons, not including the 9.5 sacks he had in his final full year with Atlanta (1977). He missed the 1975 season with a knee injury.

The 1977 Falcons had an historically excellent defense, known as the "Grits Blitz". The Falcons defense gave up only 129 points on the year, a 14-game record. This broke the prior record of the 1969 Minnesota Vikings team that went to the Super Bowl (133). The 25th ranked offense was so poor, however, it scored only 179 points, and the team finished with a 7–7 record.

Humphrey temporarily retired after four games in 1978, because of the team's perpetual lack of success; going to work for WAOK radio station in Atlanta, where he had The Claude Humphrey Show. He later decided to return to football, and in 1979, the Falcons traded him to the Eagles for two fourth-round draft picks.

Humphrey finished out his career with the Philadelphia Eagles from 1979 to 1981. In 1980, Humphrey was a designated pass rusher, recording a team-high 14½ or 15½ sacks (career high) helping the Eagles become NFC champions and earn a spot in Super Bowl XV. During Super Bowl XV, when Humphrey was called for roughing the passer against Oakland Raiders quarterback Jim Plunkett, he picked up the penalty flag and fired it back at referee Ben Dreith.

He finished his career with an unofficial 122, 126 1/2 or 130 career sacks with the Falcons and Eagles. He retired in 1981, the season before sacks were recorded as an official NFL statistic.

=== All-Pro and Pro Bowl honors ===
Humphrey's stellar career included being named first-team All-Pro five times (1971/NEA, 1972/AP, 1973/AP, 1974/NEA,1977/NEA), second-team All-Pro four times (1969/AP, 1970/NEA, 1974/AP, 1977/AP), and All-NFC six times (1970/AP, 1971/AP, 1972/AP, 1973/AP, 1974/AP, 1977/Pro Football Weekly). He was NEA second-team All-NFC in 1976 when Humphrey unofficially recorded a Falcons career-high or career-high 14½ or 15 quarterback sacks. In addition, Humphrey was named to the Pro Bowl six times over the span of his career (1970–74, 1977).

=== Coaching ===
Humphrey served as a defensive line coach for the Falcons in the 1990s.

== Pro Football Hall of Fame ==
Humphrey was a final 15 candidate for induction into the Pro Football Hall of Fame in 2003, 2005, and 2006. On August 27, 2008, he was named as one of two senior candidates for the 2009 Hall of Fame election. In August 2013, he was named as one of two senior candidates for the 2014 Hall of Fame election.

In February 2014, Claude Humphrey was elected to the Pro Football Hall of Fame on the senior ballot.

On August 2, 2014, Humphrey was officially inducted at the Enshrinement Ceremony where his bust, sculpted by Scott Myers, was unveiled.

== Honors ==
In addition to the Pro Football Hall of Fame, in 1988 Humphrey was inducted into the Tennessee Sports Hall of Fame. In 2008, he was inducted into the Falcons' Ring of Honor. In 2012, he was inducted into the Black College Football Hall of Fame. He has also been inducted into the Tennessee State University Hall of Fame in 1983, the Georgia Sports Hall of Fame in 2004, the Atlanta Sports Hall of Fame, and his high school's hall of fame. Both his TSU and high school jersey numbers have been retired.

The Professional Football Researchers Association named Humphrey to the PFRA Hall of Very Good Class of 2009.

== Personal life ==
During the off-seasons for Atlanta, he worked in Nashville for the Metro Board Parks and Recreation. After retiring as a player, Humphrey owned a livestock ranch in Oakland, Tennessee.

Humphrey also had a guest appearance on The Dukes of Hazzard episode "Repo Men" in which he portrayed Big John, a counterfeiter.

== Death ==
Humphrey died in Memphis on December 3, 2021, at the age of 77. His wife Sarah (Harrell) Humphrey, who had been his high school girlfriend, died in 2013. His 2014 Hall of Fame induction speech began with the story of his life with Sarah. He was survived by their three daughters.
