= Bill Parkyn =

American scientist (1944–2012)

William A. Parkyn Jr
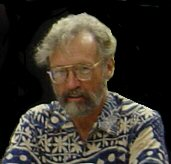
- William Parkyn
- Born: 8 September 1944; Teaneck, NJ, United States
- Died: 10 December 2012 (aged 68); Los Angeles, United States
- Occupations: Optical design; Inventor
- Spouse: Liz

Bill Parkyn (8 September 1944 – 10 December 2012) was an American scientist who lived in Lomita, California area and worked on nonimaging optics.

== Early life and education ==
Parkyn was born in New Jersey and raised in Orange County, California.

He had a Bachelor of Science (BS) in Aeronautics/Aviation/Aerospace Science and Technology and was a General at Massachusetts Institute of Technology on a full four-year scholarship.

== Career ==
Parkyn worked on nonimaging optics. His specialties were solving new optical design problems for LED illumination and generating new intellectual property. The book "Introduction to Nonimaging Optics", in its acknowledgments, refers that it "benefited from the writing skills and extensive experience of Bill Parkyn in optics, who edited the whole book, greatly improving readability."

He was the chief scientist of InteLED from 2001 to 2012, Chief Technology Officer of Teledyne Lighting & Display in Marina Del Rey, California from 1992 to 2002 and part of the technical staff at bd Systems in Torrance CA from 1985 to 1994.

In his job at bd Systems, Parkin developed PC-based programs for simulating Earth orbit surveillance, launch vehicle performance, SDI particle-beam targeting, missile-warfare scenarios, and ASAT coverage. bd Systems was a provider of aerospace engineering and information technology (IT) services.

In the 1980s he worked at National Technical Systems where he set up and ran one of the few approved solar thermal panel testing facilities in the United States.

Parkyn's technical expertise was wide-ranging and included the fields of nonimaging optics, optical engineering, thermal engineering, solar energy and patent drafting. Parkyn was a prolific inventor and his list of patents is extensive. He was one of the inventors of the modern TIR (Total Internal Reflection) lens as exemplified by US patent 5676453 issued in 1997 with his co-inventor Dr. David Pelka. He and Dr. Pelka collaborated on a number of inventions over a period of several decades. Parkyn was also a co-inventor with the famous Dr. Roland Winston (US 6177761) on a patent to better extract and radiate light from LEDs. Parkyn collaborated on many inventions with researchers at the company Light Prescriptions Innovators (USA and Spain) and Universidad Politécnica de Madrid from 2000 to 2012. Overall, Parkyn held 23 patents.

His personal interests were also varied and included world history, astrophysics, economics, cell biology, political philosophy or philosophy of the mind and Vikings and their written language or runes.

== See also ==
- Nonimaging optics
