= 1968 Little All-America college football team =

American college football all-star team

The 1968 Little All-America college football team is composed of college football players from small colleges and universities who were selected by the Associated Press (AP) as the best players at each position. For 1968, the AP selected two teams, each team having separate offensive and defensive platoons.

Two players were included on the first team for the third consecutive year: running back Carl Garrett of New Mexico Highlands and split end Dwayne Nix of Texas A&I. Garret was the AFL Rookie of the Year in 1969.

Quarterback Sonny Wade of Emory & Henry won first-team honors and went on to play 10 seasons in the Canadian Football League (CFL), winning three Grey Cup championships for the Montreal Alouettes in 1970, 1974, and 1977.

== First team ==
Position	Player	Team
Offense
QB	Sonny Wade	Emory & Henry
HB	Carl Garrett	New Mexico Highlands
HB	Paul Hatchett	North Dakota State
FB	Lloyd Edwards	San Diego State
E	Bruce Cerone	Emporia
E	Dwayne Nix	Texas A&I
T	Denny Nelson	Illinois State
T	Jim Urczyk	Central Missouri
G	Dan Klepper	Omaha
G	Larry Small	Northern Arizona
C	Dick Dobbert	Springfield (MA)
Defense
DE	Fred Dryer	San Diego State
DE	Tally Windham	McMurry
DT	Bill Bailey	Lewis & Clark
DT	Jim Ferge	North Dakota State
MG	Ron Brown	Tampa
LB	Bill Bergey	Arkansas State
LB	Tim Buchanan	Hawaii
LB	Tom McCall	Fresno State
DB	Dan Eckstein	Presbyterian
DB	Jim Marsalis	Tennessee A&I
DB	Jack O'Brien	Colorado State

== Second team ==
Position	Player	Team
Offense
QB	Sim Byrd	Troy State
HB	Frank McGuigan	Arkansas State
HB	Mike Quirk	Moorhead State (MN)
FB	Darwin Gonnerman	South Dakota State
E	Joe Campanelli	Cornell (IA)
E	Angelo Napolitano	Chattanooga
T	Mike Antonelli	Santa Clara
T	Jim Koehler	South Dakota
G	Mike Morris	Randolph–Macon
G	Fred Troike	Eastern Kentucky
C	Fred Selfe	Emory & Henry
Defense
DE	Jim Feltz	Wittenberg
DE	Bud Wiedoff	Northern Arizona
DT	Ken Frith	Northeast Louisiana
DT	Joe Lanzilli	Northeastern
MG	Lee Patek	Pomona
LB	Bill Assenhelmar	Alfred
LB	Glen Lafluer	Southwestern Louisiana
LB	Calvin Lee	Willamette
DB	Garry Grady	Eastern Michigan
DB	David Hadley	Alcorn A&M
DB	Ron Overbay	East Tennessee State

== See also ==
- 1968 College Football All-America Team
