= Carl Garrett =

American football player (1947–2020)

No. 30, 26, 31
- Position: Running back

Personal information
- Born: August 31, 1947; Denton, Texas, U.S.
- Died: August 24, 2020 (aged 72); Denton, Texas, U.S.
- Listed height: 5 ft 11 in (1.80 m)
- Listed weight: 210 lb (95 kg)

Career information
- High school: Fred Moore (Denton)
- College: New Mexico Highlands
- NFL draft: 1969: 3rd round, 58th overall pick

Career history
- Boston / New England Patriots (1969–1972); Chicago Bears (1973–1974); New York Jets (1975); Oakland Raiders (1976–1977)

Awards and highlights
- Super Bowl champion (XI); AFL All-Star (1969); 3× First-team Little All-American (1966–1968)

Career NFL/AFL statistics
- Rushing yards: 4,197
- Rushing average: 4.1
- Receptions: 182
- Receiving yards: 1,931
- Total touchdowns: 35
- Return yards: 4,191
- Stats at Pro Football Reference

Carl L. Garrett (August 31, 1947 – August 24, 2020) was an American professional football running back who began his professional career with the American Football League (AFL)'s Boston Patriots.

Garrett caught 29 passes for 267 yards and two touchdowns in 1969, and ran the ball for over five yards per carry with 137 attempts for 691 yards and five touchdowns. He was the 1969 Sporting News ' AFL Rookie of the Year. He was also selected to the AFL All-Star team in 1969.

Garrett was involved in a highly unusual trade just prior to the 1971 season. The Patriots traded Garrett to the Dallas Cowboys for running back Duane Thomas. Shortly after the players reported to their new teams, the trade was rescinded, and Thomas returned to the Cowboys and Garrett to the Patriots. The Cowboys ultimately won the Super Bowl at the end of the 1971 season with Duane Thomas as their leading rusher in the game. Garrett won Super Bowl XI with the 1976 Oakland Raiders, gaining 19 yards on four carries in the game.

== NFL/AFL career statistics ==
Legend
	Won the Super Bowl
	Led the league
**Bold**	Career high

=== Regular season ===
Year	Team	Games		Rushing					Receiving				
Year	Team	GP	GS	Att	Yds	Avg	Lng	TD	Rec	Yds	Avg	Lng	TD
1969	BOS	14	9	137	691	**5.0**	**80**	**5**	29	267	9.2	34	**2**
1970	BOS	13	12	88	272	3.1	26	4	26	216	8.3	29	0
1971	NWE	14	14	**181**	**784**	4.3	38	1	22	265	12.0	**80**	1
1972	NWE	10	6	131	488	3.7	41	**5**	**30**	**410**	**13.7**	43	0
1973	CHI	13	11	175	655	3.7	35	**5**	23	292	12.7	39	0
1974	CHI	7	6	96	346	3.6	19	1	16	132	8.3	20	1
1975	NYJ	13	8	122	566	4.6	40	**5**	19	180	9.5	20	1
1976	OAK	12	1	48	220	4.6	17	1	9	108	12.0	26	0
1977	OAK	14	0	53	175	3.3	13	1	8	61	7.6	13	**2**
Career		110	67	1,031	4,197	4.1	80	28	182	1,931	10.6	80	7

=== Playoffs ===
Year	Team	Games		Rushing					Receiving				
Year	Team	GP	GS	Att	Yds	Avg	Lng	TD	Rec	Yds	Avg	Lng	TD
1976	OAK	3	0	**7**	**27**	3.9	**13**	0	**2**	**15**	**7.5**	**11**	0
1977	OAK	2	0	1	6	**6.0**	6	0	0	0	0.0	0	0
Career		5	0	8	33	4.1	13	0	2	15	7.5	11	0

== See also ==
- List of American Football League players
