= Lowell M. Snow =

American Mormon bishop (born 1944)

Second Quorum of the Seventy
- April 2, 2005 – October 1, 2011
- Called by: Gordon B. Hinckley
- End reason: Honorably released

Personal details
- Born: Lowell Miller Snow; January 2, 1944 (age 82); St. George, Utah, U.S.

Lowell Miller Snow (born January 2, 1944) was a general authority of the Church of Jesus Christ of Latter-day Saints (LDS Church) from 2005 to 2011. Snow was a member of the Second Quorum of the Seventy and in 2006 became the president of the Africa West Area of the church.

Snow is a descendant of Erastus Snow and grew up in St. George, Utah. He served as a LDS Church missionary in Germany and then attended Brigham Young University, where he met his wife Tamara. Snow then received a master's degree in counseling from Wayne State University.

Snow was in the United States military, doing intelligence work in Germany. He then earned a law degree at the University of Utah. Snow spent his career largely as a corporate and independent lawyer. He wrote the article on "blood atonement" in the 1992 Encyclopedia of Mormonism.

Snow was the president of the Mississippi Jackson Mission of the LDS Church from 1982 to 1985, the president of the Salt Lake City Temple Square Mission from 1997 to 1999, and served as a temporary Mission President of the Georgia Atlanta Mission from July 2012-October 2012. After serving as President of Temple Square, Snow served as director of Church Hosting.

Among various other callings he held prior to his call as a general authority, Snow was a bishop and as an area seventy.

Snow and his wife are the parents of five children.

On October 1, 2011, Snow was released from the Second Quorum of the Seventy at the LDS Church's semi-annual general conference.
