= Donald Nicolaisen =

Donald T. Nicolaisen (1944–2019) was the chief accountant for the U.S. Securities and Exchange Commission between 2003 and 2005.
