= Rio Grande (company) =

Jewelry-making supply company

Coordinates: 35°5′1.3″N 106°43′14.6″W

- Industry: Jewelry
- Founded: 1944; 82 years ago
- Founder: Saul Bell
- Owner: Berkshire Hathaway (since 2013)

Rio Grande is a jewelry-making equipment, tools and supplies company located in Albuquerque, New Mexico. Founded in 1944 by jeweler Saul Bell, the company is run by Arien Gessner (CEO).

Rio Grande, a Berkshire Hathaway Company since 2013, offers jewelry-making supplies. While specializing in silver findings and fabrication materials, the company also provides metalsmithing tools and equipment, jewelry displays and packaging products, jewelry workbenches, casting machines and kilns, soldering and welding torches, gemstones, diamonds, and bead stringing materials. They also supply craft artisans who work in enamels and resins as well as copper and bronze metal clay (COPPRclay and BRONZclay) and silver and gold Precious Metal Clays (PMC). The company annually produces at least two product catalogs, specifically its Gems & Findings and Tools & Equipment books.

The Rio Grande facility includes a large manufacturing area where many sterling silver and other precious metal findings, like jewelry chain, jump rings and split rings, clasps are produced both by fabrication and by casting methods. Since 2010, the entire facility has been solar-powered from nearly five acres of solar panels installed on the property. At the time of construction, the solar array was the largest solar photovoltaic installation in New Mexico with an expected annual output of 1.6 million kilowatt hours of electricity. Rio Grande regularly host jewelry making classes and workshop series for both professional and inexperienced artisans.

Rio Grande is principle-based (guided by 15 overarching principles) rather than rule-based. Employees are encouraged to take an active role in the company's success through its participative management structure. The participative management concept is supposed to encourage the formation of small groups (teams) of employees organized by their functions roles to execute necessary business tasks and resolve specific challenges as they arise around the company. This style of management sprang, in part, from study of the Japanese quality circle movement and strategies from Toyota Production Systems' "Lean Manufacturing" approach.
