= Little All-America team =

Annual award to the best players in collegiate sports

- Awarded for: The best small college players at their respective positions
- Country: United States
- Presented by: Associated Press

The Little All-America team is an honor given annually in the United States to the best small-college players at their respective positions.

The first Little All-America team for college football, selected with assistance from reporters in every region, was announced in December 1934 by Edward J. Neil of the Associated Press (AP). Neil wrote that the Little All-America team was intended to honor "the little fellows, players in hundreds of colleges who labored just as earnestly, often with just as much ability, but barely edging into the spotlight . . ."

Players who received Little All-America honors (years in parentheses) and were later inducted into the Pro Football Hall of Fame include: Joe Stydahar (1934), Bulldog Turner (1939), Tony Canadeo (1939), Andrew Robustelli (1949), Buck Buchanan (1962), Willie Lanier (1965), Terry Bradshaw (1969), Walter Payton (1974), and Shannon Sharpe (1989).

Other notable Little All-Americans include Otis Taylor (1964), Carl Garrett (1966, 1967, 1968), Billy "White Shoes" Johnson (1973), Ed "Too Tall" Jones (1973), Wilbert Montgomery (1973), Neil Lomax (1980), Christian Okoye (1986), and Erik Williams (1990).

The award also exists for college basketball.

In 2017, the award was divided into DII and DIII Little All-America teams.
