= 1969 Chicago Bears season =

NFL team season

- Owner: George Halas
- Head coach: Jim Dooley
- Home stadium: Wrigley Field

Results
- Record: 1–13
- Division place: 4th Central
- Playoffs: Did not qualify

The 1969 Chicago Bears season was their 50th regular season completed in the National Football League. The team finished with a franchise-worst 1–13 record. The Bears' own historical record described the 1–13 campaign as the lowest point in franchise history at the time. This occurred despite the contributions of future Pro Football Hall of Fame players Dick Butkus and Gale Sayers. Sayers had torn the ligaments in his right knee in November 1968. After surgery, he went through a physical rehabilitation program with the help of teammate Brian Piccolo. In 1969, Sayers led the league in rushing once again with 1,032 yards, but lacked his previous speed, and averaged only 4.4 yards per carry. This would also turn out to be Sayers final full season, as he would be on the injured reserve list for the entire 1970 and '71 seasons before finally retiring.

An already poor season was compounded in late November. Undersized fullback Piccolo had scored a touchdown in each of his final three games (November 2, 9, 16), but a persistent cough was diagnosed as cancer and he underwent chest surgery; he succumbed to the disease seven months later at age 26.

The Bears scored a total of only 27 points in 6 division games.

== Offseason ==
=== Draft ===
1969 Chicago Bears draft
Round	Pick	Player	Position	College	Notes
1	14	Rufus Mayes	Offensive tackle	Ohio State	
2	41	Bobby Douglass	Quarterback	Kansas	
3	66	Ross Montgomery	Running back	TCU	
4	91	Rudy Redmond	Cornerback	Pacific	
5	119	Jim Winegardner	Tight end	Notre Dame	
6	114	Bill Nicholson	Defensive end	Stanford	
7	169	Ron Copeland	Wide receiver	UCLA	
8	197	Webb Hubbell	Guard	Arkansas	
9	222	Joe Aluise	Running back	Arizona	
10	247	Ron Pearson	Tight end	Maryland	
11	275	Sam Campbell	Defensive tackle	Iowa State	
12	300	Dave Hale	Defensive tackle	Ottawa	
13	325	Tom Quinn	Defensive back	Notre Dame	
14	353	Ron Ehrig	Defensive back	Texas	
15	378	Bob Coble	Punter	Kansas State	
16	403	Dave Stydahar	Guard	Purdue	
17	431	Bob Long	Wide receiver	Texas A&M	
Made roster

== Roster ==
1969 Chicago Bears roster
Quarterbacks (QB): 15 Virgil Carter; 11 Jack Concannon; 14 Bobby Douglass; Running backs (RB): 33 Mike Hull; 32 Ralph Kurek; 22 Ross Montgomery; 40 Gale Sayers; Wide receivers (WR): 36 Ron Copeland; 45 Dick Gordon; 21 Cecil Turner; 89 Bob Wallace; Tight ends (TE): 84 Austin Denney; 38 Ray Ogden; 82 Emilio Vallez	Offensive linemen (OL): 72 Jim Cadile G; 58 Jim Ferguson C; 65 Randy Jackson T; 74 Wayne Mass T; 71 Rufus Mayes T; 68 Howard Mudd G; 50 Mike Pyle C; 67 George Seals G; 63 Bob Wetoska T; Defensive linemen (DL): 81 Marty Amsler DE; 73 Frank Cornish DT; 79 Dick Evey DT; 75 Dave Hale DE; 85 Willie Holman DE/DT; 70 Ken Kortas DT; 87 Ed O'Bradovich DE	Linebackers (LB): 55 Doug Buffone OLB; 51 Dick Butkus MLB; 59 Rudy Kuechenberg OLB; 53 Dave Martin MLB; 86 Loyd Phillips OLB; Defensive backs (DB): 23 Dick Daniels FS; 49 Major Hazelton CB; 44 Garry Lyle SS; 26 Bennie McRae CB; 20 Joe Taylor CB; 37 George Youngblood SS; Special teams (ST): 88 Bobby Joe Green P; 83 Mac Percival K	Practice squad: 35 Joe Aluise RB; 69 Ted Wheeler G; Reserve: 29 Ronnie Bull RB (IR); 41 Brian Piccolo RB (NF-Ill.); 57 Dan Pride LB (IR); 80 Jerry Simmons WR (IR); Rookies in italics

=== Preseason ===
On August 30, a crowd of 85,532 fans viewed a doubleheader at Cleveland's Municipal Stadium. In the first contest, the Bears played the AFL's Buffalo Bills, while the Cleveland Browns hosted the Green Bay Packers in the second match.

== Regular season ==
=== Schedule ===
Week	Date	Opponent	Result	Record	Venue	Attendance
1	September 21	at **Green Bay Packers**	**L** 0–17	0–1	Lambeau Field	50,861
2	September 28	at St. Louis Cardinals	**L** 17–20	0–2	Busch Memorial Stadium	50,039
3	October 5	at New York Giants	**L** 24–28	0–3	Yankee Stadium	62,583
4	October 12	**Minnesota Vikings**	**L** 0–31	0–4	Wrigley Field	45,757
5	October 19	at **Detroit Lions**	**L** 7–13	0–5	Tiger Stadium	54,732
6	October 26	Los Angeles Rams	**L** 7–9	0–6	Wrigley Field	45,985
7	November 2	at **Minnesota Vikings**	**L** 14–31	0–7	Metropolitan Stadium	47,900
8	November 9	Pittsburgh Steelers	**W** 38–7	1–7	Wrigley Field	45,851
9	November 16	at Atlanta Falcons	**L** 31–48	1–8	Atlanta Stadium	53,722
10	November 23	Baltimore Colts	**L** 21–24	1–9	Wrigley Field	45,455
11	November 30	Cleveland Browns	**L** 24–28	1–10	Wrigley Field	45,050
12	December 6	at San Francisco 49ers	**L** 21–42	1–11	Kezar Stadium	32,826
13	December 14	**Green Bay Packers**	**L** 3–21	1–12	Wrigley Field	45,216
14	December 21	**Detroit Lions**	**L** 3–20	1–13	Wrigley Field	41,879
Note: Intra-division opponents are in **bold** text.

== Standings ==
NFL Central
	W	L	T	PCT	DIV	CONF	PF	PA	STK
Minnesota Vikings	12	2	0	.857	6–0	9–1	379	133	L1
Detroit Lions	9	4	1	.692	3–3	6–3–1	259	188	W2
Green Bay Packers	8	6	0	.571	3–3	5–5	269	221	W2
Chicago Bears	1	13	0	.071	0–6	0–10	210	339	L6

Note: Tie games were not officially counted in the standings until 1972.
