= 1968 Chicago Bears season =

NFL team season

- Owner: George Halas
- General manager: George Halas
- Head coach: Jim Dooley
- Home stadium: Wrigley Field

Results
- Record: 7–7
- Division place: 2nd Central
- Playoffs: Did not qualify

The 1968 season was the Chicago Bears' 49th in the National Football League. The team failed to improve on their 7–6–1 record from 1967 and finished with a 7–7 record under first-year head coach Jim Dooley and earning them a second-place finish in the Central Division within the NFL's Western Conference, a game behind the Minnesota Vikings.

Star running back Gale Sayers tore the ligaments in his right knee against San Francisco on November 10 and was lost for the season.

The Bears had the tiebreaker advantage over Minnesota, after defeating them twice. They needed a win over the Green Bay Packers in the season finale to clinch the division title, but lost by a point at home.

The following season, Chicago posted its worst record in franchise history at 1–13. The Bears' next postseason appearance was in 1977, as a wild card team, and the next division title came in 1984.

== Offseason ==
George Halas, age 73, retired as head coach of the Bears for the fourth and final time on May 27. Dooley, 38, was promoted and introduced as head coach the following day.

=== NFL/AFL draft ===
1968 Chicago Bears draft
Round	Pick	Player	Position	College	Notes
1	16	Mike Hull	Fullback	USC	
2	46	Bob Wallace	Tight end	UTEP	
3	57	Major Hazelton	Defensive back	Florida A&M	
4	99	Wayne Mass	Offensive tackle	Clemson	
4	106	Alan Bush	Guard	Ole Miss	
5	127	Cecil Turner *	Wide receiver	Cal Poly-San Luis Obispo	
6	154	Jim Schmedding	Center	Weber State	
7	181	Willie Holman	Defensive end	South Carolina State	
8	208	Wayne Bell	Running back	Lenoir–Rhyne	
9	235	Sam Moore	Tackle	Mississippi Valley State	
10	262	Fred Davis	Guard	Doane	
11	289	Rich Coady	Tight end	Memphis State	made in 1970
12	316	Emilio Vallez	Linebacker	New Mexico	
13	343	Willie Dearion	Wide receiver	Prairie View A&M	
14	370	Harold Gargus	Defensive tackle	New Mexico State	
15	397	Rich Jaeger	Center	Gustavus Adolphus	
16	424	Jim Murphy	Kicker	Utah State	
17	451	Gene Layton	Defensive tackle	Colorado State	
Made roster

=== Undrafted free agents ===
1968 undrafted free agents of note
Player	Position	College
Bill Cooper	Running back	

== Roster ==
1968 Chicago Bears roster
Quarterbacks (QB): 10 Rudy Bukich; 11 Jack Concannon; 12 Larry Rakestraw; Running backs (RB): 29 Ronnie Bull; 33 Mike Hull; 32 Ralph Kurek; 41 Brian Piccolo; Wide receivers (WR): 45 Dick Gordon; 21 Cecil Turner; 89 Bob Wallace; Tight ends (TE): 84 Austin Denney; 82 Emilio Vallez	Offensive linemen (OL): 72 Jim Cadile G; 65 Randy Jackson T; 60 Doug Kriewald G; 74 Wayne Mass T; 70 Bob Pickens T; 50 Mike Pyle C; 67 George Seals G; 63 Bob Wetoska T; Defensive linemen (DL): 73 Frank Cornish DT; 79 Dick Evey DT; 85 Willie Holman DE; 76 John Johnson DT; 87 Ed O'Bradovich DE; 86 Loyd Phillips DE	Linebackers (LB): 55 Doug Buffone OLB; 51 Dick Butkus MLB; 59 Rudy Kuechenberg OLB; 57 Dan Pride OLB; 53 Jim Purnell OLB; 62 Mike Reilly MLB; Defensive backs (DB): 23 Clarence Childs CB/S; 46 Curt Gentry CB; 49 Major Hazelton FS; 26 Bennie McRae CB; 17 Richie Petitbon SS; 20 Joe Taylor CB; 24 Roosevelt Taylor FS; Special teams (ST): 80 Jon Kilgore P; 83 Mac Percival K	Practice squad: 68 Bob Breitenstein T; 34 Tim Casey LB; 35 Rich Coady TE; 25 Tom Greenlee S; Reserve: 81 Marty Amsler DE (IR); 15 Virgil Carter QB (IR); 88 Bobby Joe Green P (IR); 43 Bob Jones WR (Military); 48 Andy Livingston RB (Left Squad); 40 Gale Sayers RB (IR); Rookies in italics

== Regular season ==
=== Schedule ===
Week	Date	Opponent	Result	Record	Venue	Attendance
1	September 15	Washington Redskins	**L** 28–38	0–1	Wrigley Field	41,321
2	September 22	at **Detroit Lions**	**L** 0–42	0–2	Tiger Stadium	50,688
3	September 29	at **Minnesota Vikings**	**W** 27–17	1–2	Metropolitan Stadium	47,644
4	October 6	at Baltimore Colts	**L** 7–28	1–3	Memorial Stadium	60,238
5	October 13	**Detroit Lions**	**L** 10–28	1–4	Wrigley Field	46,996
6	October 20	at Philadelphia Eagles	**W** 29–16	2–4	Franklin Field	60,858
7	October 27	**Minnesota Vikings**	**W** 26–24	3–4	Wrigley Field	46,562
8	November 3	at **Green Bay Packers**	**W** 13–10	4–4	Lambeau Field	50,861
9	November 10	San Francisco 49ers	**W** 27–19	5–4	Wrigley Field	46,978
10	November 17	Atlanta Falcons	**L** 13–16	5–5	Wrigley Field	44,214
11	November 24	Dallas Cowboys	**L** 3–34	5–6	Wrigley Field	46,667
12	December 1	at New Orleans Saints	**W** 23–17	6–6	Tulane Stadium	78,285
13	December 8	at Los Angeles Rams	**W** 17–16	7–6	Los Angeles Memorial Coliseum	66,368
14	December 15	**Green Bay Packers**	**L** 27–28	7–7	Wrigley Field	46,435
Note: Intra-division opponents are in **bold** text.

=== Game summaries ===
==== Week 3 ====
Team	1	2	3	4	Total
• Bears	14	6	0	7	27
Vikings	0	3	0	14	17

- Date: September 29
- Location: Metropolitan Stadium, Bloomington, MN
- Game weather: 54 °F (12 °C); wind 7 mph

Scoring summary
Q1	CHI	Sayers 7-yard run (Percival kick)	CHI 7–0
Q1	CHI	Gordon 15-yard pass from Concannon (Percival kick)	CHI 14–0
Q2	CHI	Percival 43-yard field goal	CHI 17–0
Q2	MIN	Cox 45-yard field goal	CHI 17–3
Q2	CHI	Percival 31-yard field goal	CHI 20–3
Q4	MIN	Washington 24-yard pass from Cuozzo (Cox kick)	CHI 20–10
Q4	MIN	Brown 1-yard run (Cox kick)	CHI 20–17
Q4	CHI	Kurek 23-yard run (Percival kick)	CHI 27–17

- Gale Sayers 16 Rush, 108 Yds

==== Week 6 ====
Team	1	2	3	4	Total
• Bears	7	6	3	13	29
Eagles	3	10	3	0	16

- Date: October 20
- Location: Franklin Field, Philadelphia, PA
- Game weather: 62 °F (17 °C); wind 12 mph

Scoring summary
Q1	PHI	Baker 30-yard field goal	PHI 3–0
Q1	CHI	Turner 11-yard pass from Carter (Percival kick)	CHI 7–3
Q2	PHI	Baker 27-yard field goal	CHI 7–6
Q2	PHI	Ditka 2-yard pass from Snead (Baker kick)	PHI 13–7
Q2	CHI	Percival 39-yard field goal	PHI 13–10
Q2	CHI	Percival 31-yard field goal	Tie 13–13
Q3	CHI	Percival 28-yard field goal	CHI 16–13
Q3	PHI	Baker 44-yard field goal	Tie 16–16
Q4	CHI	Percival 15-yard field goal	CHI 19–16
Q4	CHI	Taylor 96-yard interception return (Percival kick)	CHI 26–16
Q4	CHI	Percival 14-yard field goal	CHI 29–16

==== Week 7 ====
Team	1	2	3	4	Total
Vikings	7	7	0	10	24
• Bears	7	6	7	6	26

- Date: October 27
- Location: Wrigley Field, Chicago, IL
- Game weather: 51 °F (11 °C); wind 17 mph

Scoring summary
Q1	MIN	Lindsey 1-yard run (Cox kick)	MIN 7–0
Q1	CHI	Wallace 12-yard pass from Carter (Percival kick)	Tie 7–7
Q2	CHI	Percival 12-yard field goal	CHI 10–7
Q2	MIN	Washington 54-yard pass from Kapp (Cox kick)	MIN 14–10
Q2	CHI	Percival 42-yard field goal	MIN 14–13
Q3	CHI	Gordon 50-yard pass from Carter (Percival kick)	CHI 20–14
Q4	MIN	Cox 38-yard field goal	CHI 20–17
Q4	CHI	Percival 21-yard field goal	CHI 23–17
Q4	MIN	Washington 25-yard pass from Kapp (Cox kick)	MIN 24–23
Q4	CHI	Percival 47-yard field goal	CHI 26–24

- Gale Sayers 18 Rush, 143 Yds

==== Week 8 ====
Team	1	2	3	4	Total
• Bears	0	3	7	3	13
Packers	0	0	7	3	10

- Date: November 3
- Location: Lambeau Field, Green Bay, WI
- Game weather: 36 °F (2 °C); wind 9 mph
- Referee: Pat Haggerty

Scoring summary
Q2	CHI	Percival 10-yard field goal	CHI 3–0
Q3	CHI	Carter 2-yard run (Percival kick)	CHI 10–0
Q3	GB	Dale 50-yard pass from Starr (Mercin kick)	CHI 10–7
Q4	GB	Mercin 19-yard field goal	Tie 10–10
Q4	CHI	Percival 43-yard field goal	CHI 13–10

- Gale Sayers 24 Rush, 205 Yds

Mac Percival booted the game-winning field goal with 16 seconds remaining on a rare free kick following a fair catch.

== Standings ==
NFL Central
	W	L	T	PCT	DIV	CONF	PF	PA	STK
Minnesota Vikings	8	6	0	.571	4–2	6–4	282	242	W2
Chicago Bears	7	7	0	.500	3–3	5–5	250	333	L1
Green Bay Packers	6	7	1	.462	1–4–1	2–7–1	281	227	W1
Detroit Lions	4	8	2	.333	3–2–1	4–5–1	207	241	L1

Note: Tie games were not officially counted in the standings until 1972.
