= 1972 Chicago Bears season =

NFL team season

- Owner: George Halas
- Head coach: Abe Gibron
- Home stadium: Soldier Field

Results
- Record: 4–9–1
- Division place: 4th NFC Central
- Playoffs: Did not qualify

The 1972 Chicago Bears season was their 53rd regular season completed in the National Football League. The team finished with a 4–9–1 record, another below .500 showing, in head coach Abe Gibron's first season. They were, however, quite successful at running the football at the quarterback position. QB Bobby Douglass ran on 143 carries for 968 yards and 8 Touchdowns. This would be later broken by Atlanta Falcons QB Michael Vick who became the first and only Quarterback to run over 1,000 yards in the NFL. But it would be held as a franchise record until Justin Fields broke that in the 2022 season. Only three other QBs have run for over 1,000 yards in one season, but they were all in the CFL.

== NFL draft ==
1972 Chicago Bears draft
Round	Pick	Player	Position	College	Notes
1	3	Lionel Antoine	Offensive tackle	Southern Illinois	traded from the New York Giants
1	12	Craig Clemons	Safety	Iowa	
3	62	Johnny Musso	Running back	Alabama	
5	117	Bob Parsons	Tight end	Penn State	
6	133	Bob Pifferini	Linebacker	UCLA	
7	167	Jim Fassel	Quarterback	Long Beach State	
7	182	Jim Osborne	Defensive tackle	Southern	
8	192	Ralph Wirtz	Wide receiver	North Dakota State	
9	219	Larry Horton	Defensive end	Iowa	
10	247	Jack Turnbull	Center	Oregon State	
11	272	Ed Wimberly	Defensive back	Jackson State	
12	297	Doug Neill	Running back	Texas A&M	
13	322	Jay Rood	Tackle	Southern (SD)	
14	347	Bob Brown	Wide receiver	Rice	
15	377	Roger Lawson	Running back	Western Michigan	
16	402	Bill McKinney	Linebacker	West Texas A&M	
17	427	LaVerne Dickinson	Defensive back	Southern	
Made roster

== Roster ==
1972 Chicago Bears roster
Quarterbacks (QB): 10 Bobby Douglass; 7 John Huarte; Running backs (RB): 35 Jim Harrison; 33 Gary Kosins; 36 Roger Lawson; 22 Cyril Pinder; 24 Don Shy; Wide receivers (WR): 43 George Farmer; 46 Matt Maslowski; 84 Jim Seymour; 21 Cecil Turner; 89 Bob Wallace; Tight ends (TE): 86 Bob Parsons; 82 Earl Thomas	Offensive linemen (OL): 79 Lionel Antoine T; 74 Bob Asher T; 73 Rich Buzin T; 72 Jim Cadile G; 52 Rich Coady C; 61 Glen Holloway G; 65 Randy Jackson T; 64 Ernie Janet G; 78 Bob Newton G; Defensive linemen (DL): 82 Steve DeLong DE; 64 Larry Horton DE; 67 Bill Line DT; 71 Tony McGee DE/DT; 68 Jim Osborne DT; 70 Andy Rice DT; 76 Bill Staley DT	Linebackers (LB): 31 Ross Brupbacher OLB; 55 Doug Buffone OLB; 51 Dick Butkus MLB; 30 Jimmy Gunn OLB; 58 Bob Pifferini OLB; 53 Larry Rowden MLB; Defensive backs (DB): 25 Craig Clemons SS; 32 Charlie Ford CB; 29 Bob Jeter CB; 18 Jerry Moore FS; 48 Ron Smith SS; 20 Joe Taylor CB; Special teams (ST): 88 Bobby Joe Green P; 83 Mac Percival K	Practice squad: 38 Robert Holmes RB; 15 Mirro Roder K; Reserve: 75 Dave Hale DE (IR); 85 Willie Holman DE (IR); 44 Garry Lyle S (IR); 54 Bill McKinney LB (IR); 49 Joe Moore RB (IR); 40 Gale Sayers RB (Retired); Rookies in italics

== Schedule ==
Week	Date	Opponent	Result	Record	Venue	Attendance
1	September 17	Atlanta Falcons	**L** 21–37	0–1	Soldier Field	55,701
2	September 24	Los Angeles Rams	**T** 13–13	0–1–1	Soldier Field	55,701
3	October 1	**Detroit Lions**	**L** 24–38	0–2–1	Soldier Field	55,701
4	October 8	at **Green Bay Packers**	**L** 17–20	0–3–1	Lambeau Field	56,263
5	October 15	at Cleveland Browns	**W** 17–0	1–3–1	Cleveland Municipal Stadium	72,339
6	October 23	**Minnesota Vikings**	**W** 13–10	2–3–1	Soldier Field	55,701
7	October 29	at St. Louis Cardinals	**W** 27–10	3–3–1	Busch Memorial Stadium	50,464
8	November 5	at **Detroit Lions**	**L** 0–14	3–4–1	Tiger Stadium	54,418
9	November 12	**Green Bay Packers**	**L** 17–23	3–5–1	Soldier Field	55,701
10	November 19	San Francisco 49ers	**L** 21–34	3–6–1	Soldier Field	55,701
11	November 26	Cincinnati Bengals	**L** 3–13	3–7–1	Soldier Field	55,701
12	December 3	at **Minnesota Vikings**	**L** 10–23	3–8–1	Metropolitan Stadium	49,784
13	December 10	at Philadelphia Eagles	**W** 21–12	4–8–1	Veterans Stadium	65,720
14	December 17	at Oakland Raiders	**L** 21–28	4–9–1	Oakland–Alameda County Coliseum	54,711
Note: Intra-division opponents are in **bold** text.

=== Standings ===
NFC Central
	W	L	T	PCT	DIV	CONF	PF	PA	STK
Green Bay Packers	10	4	0	.714	5–1	8–3	304	226	W3
Detroit Lions	8	5	1	.607	2–4	6–5	339	290	W1
Minnesota Vikings	7	7	0	.500	4–2	6–5	301	252	L2
Chicago Bears	4	9	1	.321	1–5	3–7–1	225	275	L1
