= 1973 Chicago Bears season =

NFL team season

- Owner: George Halas
- General manager: George Halas, Jr.
- Head coach: Abe Gibron
- Home stadium: Soldier Field

Results
- Record: 3–11
- Division place: 4th NFC Central
- Playoffs: Did not qualify

The 1973 Chicago Bears season was their 54th regular season completed in the National Football League. Unable to improve on their 4–9–1 record from 1972, the Bears failed to qualify for the playoffs for the 10th consecutive season, and instead went 3–11 for their fifth consecutive losing season. Their .214 winning percentage was the second-worst in franchise history until 43 years later in 2016, when the team went 3–13. This was the final season of Dick Butkus's career, as he was forced to retire due to a knee injury.

== Offseason ==
=== NFL draft ===
1973 Chicago Bears draft
Round	Pick	Player	Position	College	Notes
1	8	Wally Chambers *	Defensive end	Eastern Kentucky	
2	33	Gary Huff	Quarterback	Florida State	
2	48	Gary Hrivnak	Defensive tackle	Purdue	
5	107	Allan Ellis *	Cornerback	UCLA	
6	138	Mike Creaney	Center	Notre Dame	
8	187	Conrad Graham	Defensive back	Tennessee	
9	216	Mike Deutsch	Running back	North Dakota	
10	241	William Barry	Wide receiver	Ole Miss	
11	266	Ed Siegler	Kicker	Clemson	
12	291	Mike Griffin	Guard	Arkansas	
13	320	John Cieszkowski	Running back	Notre Dame	
14	345	Dave Juenger	Wide receiver	Ohio	
15	370	Don Rives	Linebacker	Texas Tech	
17	424	Larry Roach	Defensive back	Oklahoma	
Made roster * Made at least one Pro Bowl during career

== Roster ==
1973 Chicago Bears roster
Quarterbacks (QB): 12 Zeke Bratkowski; 10 Bobby Douglass; 19 Gary Huff; Running backs (RB): 26 Carl Garrett; 35 Jim Harrison; 33 Gary Kosins; 36 Roger Lawson; 45 Joe Moore; 39 Reggie Sanderson; Wide receivers (WR): 43 George Farmer; 17 Ike Hill; 38 Dave Juenger; 81 Mike Reppond; 82 Earl Thomas; 21 Cecil Turner; Tight ends (TE): 80 Craig Cotton; 86 Bob Parsons	Offensive linemen (OL): 79 Lionel Antoine T; 74 Bob Asher T; 52 Rich Coady C; 61 Glen Holloway G; 65 Randy Jackson T; 64 Ernie Janet G; 63 Steve Kinney T; 78 Bob Newton G; Defensive linemen (DL): 60 Wally Chambers DT; 72 Gary Hrivnak DE; 71 Tony McGee DE; 68 Jim Osborne DT; 70 Andy Rice DT; 89 Mel Tom DE	Linebackers (LB): 55 Doug Buffone OLB; 53 Gail Clark OLB; 58 Bob Pifferini OLB; 57 Don Rives MLB; 54 Adrian Young MLB; Defensive backs (DB): 25 Craig Clemons SS; 48 Allan Ellis CB; 32 Charlie Ford CB; 29 Bob Jeter CB/S; 44 Garry Lyle FS; 24 Willie Roberts CB; 20 Joe Taylor CB; Special teams (ST): 88 Bobby Joe Green P; 83 Mac Percival K; 15 Mirro Roder K	Reserve: 51 Dick Butkus LB (IR); 37 Conrad Graham S (IR); 30 Jimmy Gunn LB (IR); 75 Dave Hale DE (IR); 87 Tom Reynolds WR (IR); Rookies in italics

== Regular season ==
=== Schedule ===
Week	Date	Opponent	Result	Record	Venue	Attendance
1	September 16	Dallas Cowboys	**L** 17–20	0–1	Soldier Field	49,970
2	September 23	**Minnesota Vikings**	**L** 13–22	0–2	Soldier Field	52,035
3	September 30	at Denver Broncos	**W** 33–14	1–2	Mile High Stadium	51,159
4	October 7	at New Orleans Saints	**L** 16–21	1–3	Tulane Stadium	56,561
5	October 14	at Atlanta Falcons	**L** 6–46	1–4	Atlanta–Fulton County Stadium	58,850
6	October 21	New England Patriots	**L** 10–13	1–5	Soldier Field	47,643
7	October 28	Houston Oilers	**W** 35–14	2–5	Soldier Field	43,755
8	November 4	at **Green Bay Packers**	**W** 31–17	3–5	Lambeau Field	56,267
9	November 12	at Kansas City Chiefs	**L** 7–19	3–6	Arrowhead Stadium	70,664
10	November 18	**Detroit Lions**	**L** 7–30	3–7	Soldier Field	48,625
11	November 25	at **Minnesota Vikings**	**L** 13–31	3–8	Metropolitan Stadium	46,430
12	December 2	Los Angeles Rams	**L** 0–26	3–9	Soldier Field	47,620
13	December 9	at **Detroit Lions**	**L** 7–40	3–10	Tiger Stadium	41,729
14	December 16	**Green Bay Packers**	**L** 0–21	3–11	Soldier Field	29,157
Note: Intra-division opponents are in **bold** text.

=== Game summaries ===
==== Week 1 vs. Cowboys ====
Week One: Dallas Cowboys (0–0) at Chicago Bears (0–0)

Quarter	1	2	3	4	Total
**Cowboys**	0	17	0	3	**20**
Bears	3	0	7	7	**17**

at Soldier Field, Chicago, Illinois

- Date: September 16
- Game time: 1:00 p.m. CST
- Game weather: 55 °F (13 °C)
- Game attendance: 49,970
- Box Score

Game information

**First quarter**

- CHI – Mac Percival 33-yard field goal. Bears 3–0.

**Second quarter**

- DAL – Toni Fritsch 25-yard field goal. Tie 3–3.
- DAL – Otto Stowe 21-yard pass from Roger Staubach (Toni Fritsch kick). Cowboys 10–3.
- DAL – Bob Hayes 18-yard pass from Roger Staubach (Toni Fritsch kick). Cowboys 17–3.

Third quarter'

- CHI – Ike Hill 59-yard punt return (Mac Percival kick). Cowboys 17–10.

**Fourth quarter**

- CHI – Carl Garrett 15-yard run (Mac Percival kick). Tie 17–17.
- DAL – Toni Fritsch 11-yard field goal. Cowboys 20–17.

Top passers

- DAL – Roger Staubach – 9/22, 91 yards, 2 TD, 2 INT
- CHI – Bobby Douglass – 6/13, 52 yards, INT

Top rushers

- DAL – Calvin Hill – 31 rushes, 130 yards
- CHI – Jim Harrison – 16 rushes, 70 yards

Top receivers

- DAL – Calvin Hill – 4 receptions, 28 yards
- CHI – Jim Harrison – 4 receptions, 30 yards

==== Week 8 ====
Team	1	2	3	4	Total
• Bears	7	3	14	7	31
Packers	7	10	0	0	17

- Date: November 4
- Location: Lambeau Field
- Game start: 1:00 p.m.
- Game attendance: 56,267
- Game weather: 31 °F (−1 °C) • Wind 9 mph (14 km/h)

Scoring summary
1	CHI	Bobby Douglass 1 yard run (Mac Percival kick)	Bears 7–0
1	GB	MacArthur Lane 5 yard pass from Scott Hunter (Chester Marcol kick)	Tie 7–7
2	GB	Scott Hunter 1 yard run (Chester Marcol kick)	Packers 14–7
2	GB	Chester Marcol 25 yard field goal	Packers 17–7
2	CHI	Mac Percival 10 yard field goal	Packers 17–10
3	CHI	Bobby Douglass 1 yard run (Mac Percival kick)	Tie 17–17
3	CHI	Bobby Douglass 2 yard run (Mac Percival kick)	Bears 24–17
4	CHI	Bobby Douglass 1 yard run (Mac Percival kick)	Bears 31–17

=== Standings ===
NFC Central
	W	L	T	PCT	DIV	CONF	PF	PA	STK
Minnesota Vikings	12	2	0	.857	6–0	10–1	296	168	W2
Detroit Lions	6	7	1	.464	3–2–1	6–4–1	271	247	L1
Green Bay Packers	5	7	2	.429	1–4–1	4–6–1	202	259	W1
Chicago Bears	3	11	0	.214	1–5	1–9	195	334	L6
