= Brian's Song (2001 film) =

2001 television film

- Genre: Drama, Sport
- Based on: I Am Third by Gale Sayers; Al Silverman
- Written by: Allen Clare; John Gray
- Story by: William Blinn
- Directed by: John Gray
- Starring: Sean Maher; Mekhi Phifer; Paula Cale; Elise Neal; Aidan Devine; Dean McDermott; Ben Gazzara
- Country of origin: United States
- Original language: English

Production
- Running time: 90 minutes
- Production companies: Storyline Entertainment; Columbia TriStar Domestic Television

Original release
- Network: ABC
- Release: December 2, 2001

Brian's Song is the 2001 American remake of the 1971 television film Brian's Song, telling the story of Brian Piccolo (Sean Maher), an Italian-American running back who meets, clashes with and befriends a fellow Chicago Bears running back, African-American Gale Sayers (Mekhi Phifer). The movie was adapted from Sayers' own words in his 1970 autobiography, I Am Third. The television movie, produced by Storyline Entertainment and Columbia TriStar Domestic Television, was first broadcast in the United States on The Wonderful World of Disney on ABC on December 2, 2001.

In the movie, Piccolo is a brash rookie with the Bears. Initially thinking Sayers is arrogant – when he is only quiet and a slight bit anti-social – they rub each other the wrong way from the moment they meet. The movie, taking place from 1965 to 1970, as the civil rights movement grows, places great emphasis on integration, bringing up the conflict of when Brian and Gale room together for their first football season.

== Plot ==
Brian Piccolo and Gale Sayers are not friends in the beginning of the story; in fact they are rivals. During their first season together with pro football's Chicago Bears, Piccolo is never in the spotlight because Sayers is a better and more dynamic player. After the season, Piccolo pledges to outplay Sayers and take his starting position on the team.

During their second season, Sayers is still the Bears' starting running back. After he is injured during a game and loses hope of ever playing again, Piccolo personally takes charge of his rehabilitation on the assumption that if Sayers gives up and Piccolo moves into the starting lineup in his place, Piccolo would have made it only by chance and not by his own prowess. The two bond during this time, soon becoming good friends and roommates.

Piccolo is diagnosed with cancer. The treatments and radiation therapy are only partially effective, and every time it seems as if everything Piccolo is getting better, the cancer shows up again someplace else. Piccolo dies from the disease at age 26. During this time, Sayers stays by his side.

== Cast ==
- Sean Maher as Brian Piccolo
- Mekhi Phifer as Gale Sayers
- Paula Cale as Joy Piccolo
- Elise Neal as Linda Sayers
- Aidan Devine as Abe Gibron
- Dean McDermott as Ralph Kurek
- Ben Gazzara as Coach George Halas
- Michael Boisvert as Jack Concannon
- Jeff Ironi as Dick Butkus
- Shane Daly as Bill Filbert
- Bruce Gooch as Ed McCaskey
- Craig Eldrige as Dr. Beattie
- Michael Miller as Dr. Fox
- Shawn Lawrence as Dr. O'Conner
- Erika Cohen as Nurse
- Carly Marie Alves as Traci Piccolo (as Carley Marie Alves)
- Janessa Crimi as Lori Piccolo
- Patrick Salvagna as Brian Piccolo at 10
- Michael Birkett as Gale Sayers at 10
- Nigel Hamer as Master of Ceremonies
- James Arnold as Reporter #1
- Edgar George as Reporter #2
- Howard Hoover as TV Sportscaster
- Gary Fruchtman as Toastmaster
- Andrea Garnett as Gale's Mother
- Marvin Hinz as Brian's Father
- Tony Meyler as Gale's Father

== See also ==
- List of American football films
