= Dick Gordon (American football) =

American football player (born 1944)

No. 45, 5, 7, 88
- Position: Wide receiver

Personal information
- Born: January 1, 1944 (age 82); Cincinnati, Ohio, U.S.
- Listed height: 5 ft 11 in (1.80 m)
- Listed weight: 190 lb (86 kg)

Career information
- High school: Walnut Hills (Cincinnati)
- College: Michigan State
- NFL draft: 1965: 7th round, 88th overall pick

Career history
- Chicago Bears (1965–1971); Los Angeles Rams (1972); Green Bay Packers (1973); Los Angeles Rams (1973); San Diego Chargers (1974)

Awards and highlights
- First-team All-Pro (1970); 2× Pro Bowl (1970–1971); NFL receiving touchdowns leader (1970); NFL receptions leader (1970); 100 greatest Bears of All-Time; First-team All-Big Ten (1964)

Career NFL statistics
- Receptions: 243
- Receiving yards: 3,594
- Receiving touchdowns: 36
- Stats at Pro Football Reference

Richard Frederick Gordon (born January 1, 1944) is an American former professional football player who was a wide receiver for ten seasons in the National Football League (NFL). He played for the Chicago Bears, Los Angeles Rams, Green Bay Packers, and San Diego Chargers.

== Early life ==
Gordon was born on January 1, 1944, in Cincinnati, Ohio. His father was a physical education instructor. Gordon attended Walnut Hills High School in Cincinnati, where he was a halfback on the football team, and was also a member of the baseball team.

== College career ==
Gordon attended Michigan State University, in East Lansing, Michigan. Gordon played football at running back for Michigan State, under College Football Hall of Fame coach Duffy Daugherty.

He joined the team as a walk-on, as he did not have a football scholarship. Gordon did well on the freshman team, and was recognized as outstanding halfback at spring practice. He did not play enough the following year, however, to earn a letter as a sophomore. He again was little used on offense as a junior in 1963, with only eight rushing attempts in nine games; but did play more on defense as a junior, replacing injured defensive back Don Japinga and finally earning a varsity letter. His varsity career rushing totals at the end of his junior year were 58 yards on 14 carries.

Gordon was given more of an opportunity as a senior in 1964, but had only 100 yards in 30 attempts over his first three games. In his fourth game of the year, against Indiana University, Gordon rushed for 81 yards; and the following week he had 105 yards against Northwestern.

On October 31, Gordon ran for 199 yards on only 13 attempts against Wisconsin (15.3 yards per carry), including a 75-yard touchdown run and another run of 57 yards. This was the most rushing yardage in a game by a Spartan as a member of the Big Ten Conference, and second most in school history to Ron Rubick's 207 yards in 1962. His teammate, and future NFL Pro Bowl receiver, Gene Washington also set a school receiving record that day.

The week after the Wisconsin game he had 145 yards against Purdue, with four pass receptions, giving him 11 receptions on the seasons to go along with 630 yards rushing (after having no receptions in his prior years). Daugherty attributed Gordon's blossoming to his improved concentration. Gordon himself believed he improved because the team's blocking improved, and because he altered his running style to make sure he kept his head up so he could have a broader view of developing plays and where he should be running.

He finished the 1964 season with 741 yards in 123 attempts (six yards per carry) over nine games, and 13 receptions for 81 yards. He was second to future 1971 Chicago Bears teammate Jim Grabowski in total rushing yards in the Big Ten that year, but his six yards per carry average was first in the Big Ten. He also returned nine kickoffs for 201 yards. He was timed to have run the 100-yard dash in 9.6 seconds while at Michigan State, and also was considered a fine defensive back.

The Associated Press (AP) selected Gordon first-team All-Big Ten at halfback. He was one of only two unanimous choices on offense. Gordon's teammates named him the team's Most Valuable Player in 1964. He was selected to play in both the January 1965 East-West Shrine game and the Senior Bowl.

Gordon's quarterback on the East team in the Shrine game was the Naval Academy's Roger Staubach. Staubach had attended Purcell High School in Cincinnati, less than one mile from Gordon's Walnut Hills school; but the two had never met until coming to San Francisco for the Shrine game. Staubach completed a 38-yard pass to Gordon, setting up the East's only touchdown in the game.

== Professional career ==
=== Chicago Bears ===
The Chicago Bears selected Gordon in the seventh round of the 1965 NFL draft, 88th overall. This was the same draft in which the Bears selected future NFL greats Dick Butkus (3rd overall pick) and Gale Sayers (4th overall pick) in the first round. Although a running back in college, the Bears immediately used Gordon as a receiver in their 1965 training camp, and then into the regular season. As a rookie, Gordon started four games with only 13 receptions, but he averaged 21.5 yards per reception and had three touchdown catches. In 1966, he started 12 games and had 15 receptions for 210 yards.

In 1967, Gordon started all 14 games, with 31 receptions for 534 yards and five touchdown catches. In a November 19 game against the St. Louis Cardinals, Gordon caught two touchdown passes from Jack Concannon of 93 and 67 yards against defensive back Pat Fischer, and was given the game ball. Concannon was Gordon's roommate and closest friend on the team. Gordon started 12 games each in 1968 and 1969, catching 29 and 36 passes, respectively.

The best year of his career came in 1970, when he was named first-team All-Pro by the Associated Press, the Newspaper Enterprise Association, the Pro Football Writers of America and Pro Football Weekly. He was also named to the 1970 Pro Bowl. Gordon led the NFL with 71 receptions and 13 receiving touchdowns. He was third in the NFL with 1,026 total receiving yards.

Among his outstanding 1970 games, on October 5 against the Detroit Lions he had four receptions for 95 yards and two touchdowns, including a 60-yard touchdown reception. On November 15 against the Green Bay Packers, he had five receptions for a season-high 158 yards and a 69-yard touchdown reception. The following week against the Buffalo Bills he caught six passes for 107 yards and two touchdowns. In the Bears second game against the Packers that year, he had seven receptions for 92 yards and two touchdowns; and in the final game of the season against the New Orleans Saints, he had a season-high nine receptions, for 119 yards and a touchdown.

He had one more Pro Bowl season for the Bears in 1971, with 43 receptions for 610 yards and five touchdowns. United Press International (UPI) named him second-team All-NFC.

=== Later career ===
Gordon had a tense relationship with the Bears' front office during his years with the team, ranging from contract negotiations, his interest in players' rights, his playing habits, his hair and even his wardrobe. Gordon had held out for a time before the 1971 season, in which he ultimately played for the Bears, but played out his option. After the season ended, Gordon and Bears' owner George Halas criticized each other in the media. In 1972, he held out again, and ultimately joined the Los Angeles Rams as a free agent.

Gordon's move to the Rams was not complete until Commissioner Pete Rozelle decided on the compensation the Rams had to provide the Bears, on October 12, 1972. The Rams had already played four games by then. Further, Gordon was injured during the season with leg muscle pulls and broken ribs, and played in only four Rams games the entire year; with three receptions for 29 yards.

Gordon played in the Rams first four games of 1973, when he suffered a dislocated shoulder on October 7 against the Houston Oilers. He only played in one more game for the Rams before being cut on November 7. He had no receptions in his five Rams games that year, with one rushing attempt and three kickoff returns.

The Packers signed Gordon in 1973; however, he reinjured his shoulder and played in only two games, with no receptions. In January 1974, the Packers traded Gordon to the New England Patriots for John Mosier. The Patriots cut Gordon before the start of the 1974 season, and he was signed by the San Diego Chargers. He played in seven games for the Chargers in 1974, starting three, with only two receptions for 15 yards. The Chargers released Gordon in late October. This was his last NFL season.

== Legacy and honors ==
After playing his option year with the Bears in 1971, Gordon became a free agent on May 1, 1972. The lateness of his signing with the Rams on October 12 after the start of the 1972 campaign was due to the uncertainty of compensation that the Bears were to receive, as decided by Commissioner Pete Rozelle. The Rams sent a 1974 first-round selection (20th overall–Dave Gallagher) to the Bears as compensation; completing the last of only four times the NFL exercised the Rozelle rule. This rule allowed the commissioner to unilaterally and finally decide compensation one team must pay another for signing a player as a free agent from the former team; effectively deterring free agency by creating uncertainty and reluctance in signing free agents. Gordon was one of the fifteen plaintiffs in Mackey v. National Football League in which Judge Earl R. Larson declared that the Rozelle rule was a violation of antitrust laws on December 30, 1975.

In 2019, the Bears' 100th anniversary, he was selected as one of the 100 greatest Bears of All-Time by a number of sources, including the Bears team.

== NFL career statistics ==
Legend
	Led the league
**Bold**	Career high

=== Regular season ===
Year	Team	Games		Receiving				
Year	Team	GP	GS	Rec	Yds	Avg	Lng	TD
1965	CHI	**14**	4	13	279	**21.5**	51	3
1966	CHI	**14**	12	15	210	14.0	40	1
1967	CHI	**14**	**14**	31	534	17.2	**93**	5
1968	CHI	**14**	12	29	477	16.4	51	4
1969	CHI	**14**	12	36	414	11.5	41	4
1970	CHI	**14**	**14**	**71**	**1,026**	14.5	69	**13**
1971	CHI	13	12	43	610	14.2	45	5
1972	RAM	5	4	3	29	9.7	17	1
1973	GB	2	0	Did not record any stats				
1973	RAM	5	0	Did not record any stats				
1974	SD	7	3	2	15	7.5	17	0
Career		115	83	243	3,594	14.8	93	36
