= Vallez =

Vallez is a surname. Notable people with the surname include:

- Emilio Vallez (born 1946), American football player
- Thomas Vallez (born 1996), French badminton player
