= Jack Concannon =

American football player (1943–2005)

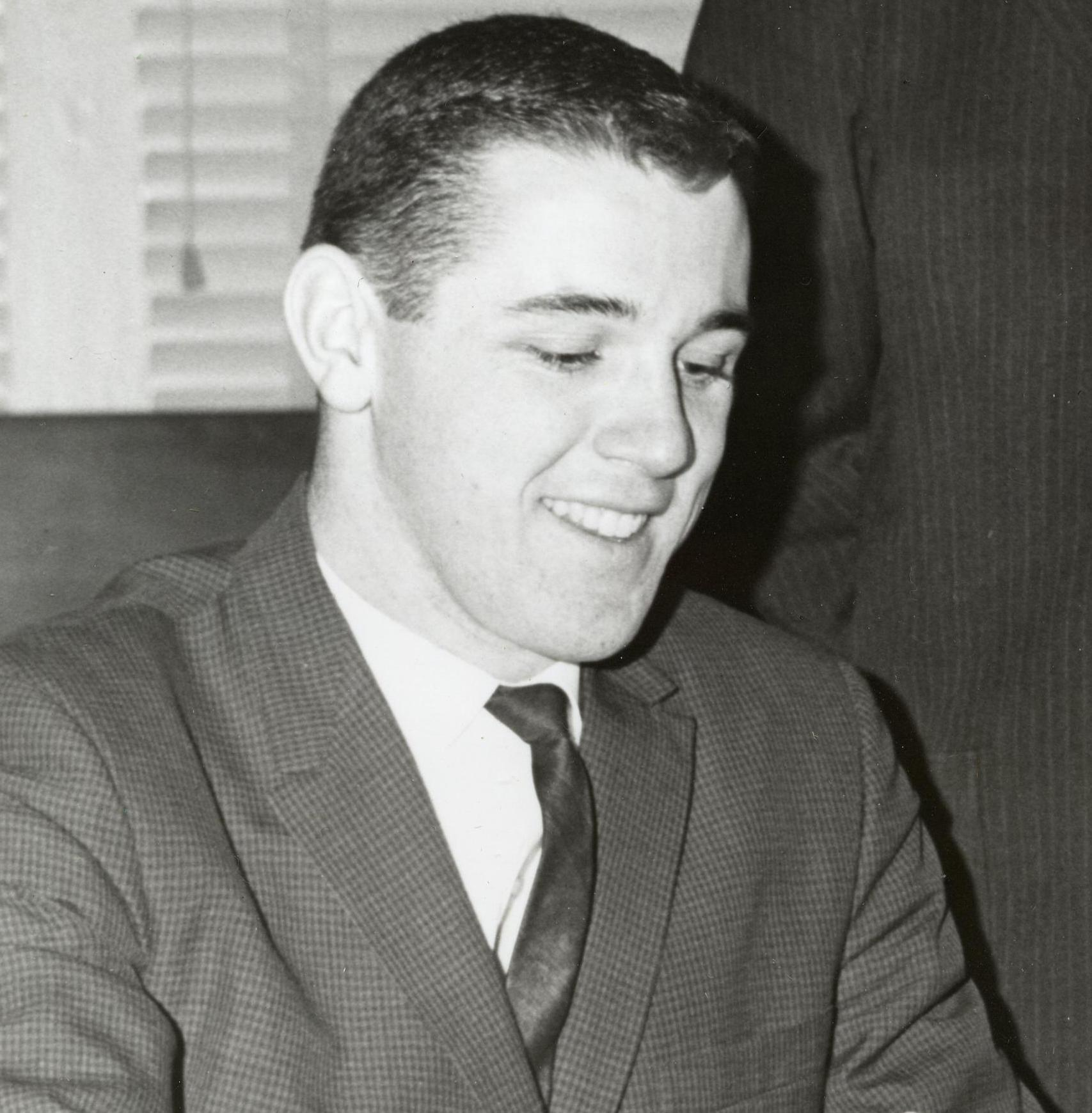
- Concannon in 1962

No. 3, 11, 10
- Position: Quarterback

Personal information
- Born: February 25, 1943; Boston, Massachusetts, U.S.
- Died: November 28, 2005 (aged 62); Newton, Massachusetts, U.S.
- Listed height: 6 ft 3 in (1.91 m)
- Listed weight: 205 lb (93 kg)

Career information
- High school: Matignon (Cambridge, Massachusetts)
- College: Boston College
- NFL draft: 1964: 2nd round, 16th overall pick
- AFL draft: 1964: 1st round, 1st overall pick

Career history
- Philadelphia Eagles (1964–1966); Chicago Bears (1967–1971); Dallas Cowboys (1972–1973)*; Green Bay Packers (1974); Detroit Lions (1975)
- * Offseason or practice squad member only

Awards and highlights
- Second-team All-East (1963); Third-team All-East (1962); All-New England (1963); Scanlan Award (1963)

Career NFL statistics
- Passing attempts: 1,110
- Passing completions: 560
- Completion percentage: 50.5%
- TD–INT: 36–63
- Passing yards: 6,270
- Passer rating: 54.8
- Rushing yards: 1,026
- Rushing touchdowns: 12
- Stats at Pro Football Reference

John Joseph Concannon Jr. (February 25, 1943 – November 28, 2005) was an American professional football player who was a quarterback in the National Football League (NFL) for the Philadelphia Eagles, Chicago Bears, Dallas Cowboys, Green Bay Packers, and Detroit Lions. He played college football for the Boston College Eagles.

== Early life ==
Concannon attended Matignon High School, where he practiced football, baseball, and basketball.

He accepted a football scholarship from Boston College. He also was a pitcher for the baseball team. He played halfback and quarterback. In the last game of the football season as a freshman, he sustained a potential career-ending back injury, which required surgery (bone fusion) and to be placed in a half body cast for six weeks.

As a sophomore, he wasn't allowed any contact in practice until the month of November. He was a third-string quarterback and tallied 10-of-23 completions (43.5%) for 162 yards, 3 interceptions, 14 carries for 29 yards and one touchdown. He also played basketball after the football season was over.

As a junior, he was named the starter at quarterback. He recorded 97-of-181 completions (53.6%), 1,450 yards, 15 passing touchdowns, 6 interceptions, 91 carries for 293 yards and 5 rushing touchdowns. He finished fifth in the nation in total offense and tied Terry Baker for the nation's lead in touchdown passes with 15.

As a senior, he posted 85-of-192 completions (44.3%) for 1,328 yards, 8 touchdown passes, 9 interceptions, 94 carries for 281 yards and 6 rushing touchdowns. He became the first school athlete to receive the Thomas F. Scanlan Award (outstanding senior scholar-athlete), the Harry Agganis Award (outstanding senior player in New England) and the O'Melia Award (outstanding player of the annual BC-Holy Cross game). He was named the Most Valuable Player in the North-South Shrine Game.

Concannon finished his college career with 192-of-396 completions for 2,940 yards, 23 touchdowns and 18 interceptions. Demonstrating his versatility, he also gained 603 rushing yards and 12 rushing touchdowns.

In 1973, he was inducted into the Boston College Varsity Club Hall of Fame.

== Professional career ==
=== Philadelphia Eagles ===
Concannon was selected by the Philadelphia Eagles in the second round (16th overall) of the 1964 NFL draft. He also was selected by the Boston Patriots in the first round (1st overall) of the 1964 AFL draft. He opted to sign a $50,000 contract with the Philadelphia Eagles. As a rookie, he was a third-string quarterback behind Norm Snead and King Hill. He appeared in 4 games (one start), completing 12-of-23 passes for 199 yards, 2 touchdowns and one interception. He started in the thirteenth game against the Dallas Cowboys, throwing for 134 yards and two touchdowns in the 24–14 win.

In 1965, he was the third-string quarterback, appearing in 3 games, while making 12-of-29 completions (41.4%) for 176 yards, one touchdown and 3 interceptions. Because his playing opportunities were limited during the season, head coach Joe Kuharich also tried to incorporate him into the games as a halfback, flanker, and punt returner.

In 1966, he still remained as the third-string quarterback, but led the team to 2 December wins that contributed to the Eagles finishing the season with a 9–5 record and a tie for second place in the Eastern Conference of the NFL. He posted 21-of-51 completions (41.2%) for 262 yards, one touchdown and 4 interceptions. He started in the thirteenth game against the Pittsburgh Steelers, tallying 13-of-25 completions for 131 yards, 15 carries for 129 yards (franchise record for quarterbacks) and one rushing touchdown, during the 27–23 victory. He also started the next week against the Cleveland Browns, posting 7-of-23 completions for 120 yards, one passing touchdown, 4 interceptions, 7 carries for 40 yards, and one rushing touchdown in the 33–21 win.

On April 26, 1967, Concannon was traded to the Chicago Bears along with a 1968 fourth round pick (#106-Alan Bush), in exchange for future hall of fame tight end Mike Ditka. The transaction was intended to fill roster vacancies created by the retirements of Eagles' tight end Pete Retzlaff and Bears' quarterback Rudy Bukich. In three seasons with the Eagles, Concannon recorded 103 passes for 637 yards (43.7%), 4 passing touchdowns, 8 interceptions, 50 carries for 433 yards (8.7-yard avg.), 2 rushing touchdowns and the team was 3–0 in his starts.

=== Chicago Bears ===
In 1967, he was named the starter at quarterback, leading the team to a 7-6-1 record, which would be George Halas' final year as an NFL head coach. Concannon appeared in 13 games (12 starts), recording 92-of-186 completions (49.5%), 1,260 yards, 6 touchdowns and 14 interceptions, while rushing for a career-high 279 yards and 3 touchdowns.

In 1968, he began the season with 7 starts (3–4), before suffering a broken collar bone against the Minnesota Vikings. He was replaced with rookie Virgil Carter, after Larry Rakestraw proved to be ineffective as the starter. Concannon collected 71-of-143 completions (49.7%) for 715 yards, 5 passing touchdowns, 9 interceptions, 104 rushing yards and 2 rushing touchdowns. He was injured and missed 7 contests.

In 1969, he lost the starting quarterback role to rookie Bobby Douglass, after the team lost the first four contests, while being outscored 62–125. Concannon appeared in 14 games (5 starts), registering 87-of-160 completions (54.4%) for 783 yards, 4 touchdowns and 8 interceptions.

In 1970, he regained the starting position from Douglass. The Bears decided to return to Douglass in the tenth game against the Buffalo Bills, who responded by throwing 4 touchdowns, but suffered a fractured wrist and was lost for the season. Concannon himself would throw for 4 touchdowns and rush for another in a win against the Packers. Concannon appeared in 14 games (13 starts), while setting career marks with 385 attempts, 194 completions, 2,130 yards, 16 touchdowns and 18 interceptions.

In 1971, he was limited to just three starts due to a left knee injury he suffered in the second quarter against the Los Angeles Rams. On August 17, 1972, he was traded to the Dallas Cowboys in exchange for offensive tackle Bob Asher, defensive tackle Bill Line and a 1973 second round draft choice (#48-Gary Hrivnak). In five seasons with the Bears, Concannon recorded 486 passes for 5,222 yards (51.1%), 31 passing touchdowns, 52 interceptions, 164 carries for 586 yards (3.6-yard avg.), 8 rushing touchdowns and the team was 17-22-1 in his starts.

=== Dallas Cowboys ===
In 1972, he was acquired by the Dallas Cowboys, because the team needed a quarterback after starting quarterback Roger Staubach suffered a separated right shoulder in the preseason game against the Los Angeles Rams. He was placed on the taxi squad, but broke his right thumb playing paddle-ball at the Cowboys' practice field, before having the chance of joining the active roster. By the time he recovered from the injury, Staubach had already been activated.

In 1973, he spent the season on the taxi squad. On July 20, 1974, he was traded to the Green Bay Packers in exchange for a 1975 fifth round pick (#113-Kyle Davis).

=== Green Bay Packers ===
In 1974, he was the third-string quarterback behind John Hadl and Jerry Tagge. He appeared in 14 games (2 starts), tallying 28-of-54 completions (51.9%) for 381 yards, one touchdown and 3 interceptions. He was released on September 15, 1975.

=== Detroit Lions ===
On October 29, 1975, he was signed as a free agent by the Detroit Lions, to provide depth after quarterbacks Bill Munson and Greg Landry suffered knee injuries against the Houston Oilers. He was the backup quarterback behind Joe Reed, appearing in 7 games, while making 1-of-2 completions (50%). He wasn't re-signed after the season.

== Legal problems ==
In March 1981, Concannon was arrested on charges that he delivered a kilogram (2.2 lb) of cocaine to an undercover drug agent in Schaumburg, Illinois, a suburb northwest of Chicago. A year later in March 1982, he was acquitted. He successfully argued entrapment after admitting he was in desperate financial straits, but Cook County Criminal Court Judge Earl Strayhorn admonished Concannon.

== Personal life ==
During his NFL career, Concannon became a partner in a restaurant. He also dabbled in acting, with a cameo appearance in the original theatrical film MASH (1970), and as himself in the critically acclaimed TV movie Brian's Song (1971), the story of Chicago Bears teammates Brian Piccolo and Gale Sayers.

== Death ==
Concannon died at age 62 in 2005 of a heart attack in Newton, Massachusetts. He is buried at Calvary Cemetery in Waltham.
