= James Acho =

American lawyer

James Acho, often credited as Jim Acho, is an American attorney, and sports law professor. Acho is a frequent guest on sports talk radio shows on a national level, and in the Detroit area. Acho is cited on air and in print as an authority on labor issues as applied to professional and collegiate sports unions and leagues.

== Biography ==
Acho has been publicly credited by numerous retired NFL and MLB players for improved benefits and has represented current and retired players in litigation. Acho is a professor of sports law at Madonna University.

In January, 2015 Acho announced he'd accepted the nomination of retired NFL players to run for NFL Players Association executive director. Acho lost the election to then-incumbent executive director DeMaurice Smith.

In 2019 and 2020, Acho made national news when he won the NFL concussion cases on behalf of Pro Football Hall of Famer Gale Sayers and broadcast legend Pat Summerall. In 2024, James Acho filed a lawsuit on behalf of former Michigan players against the NCAA and Big Ten Network, alleging they were denied earnings from the use of their name, image, and likeness.
