= Jim Dooley =

American football player and coach (1930–2008)

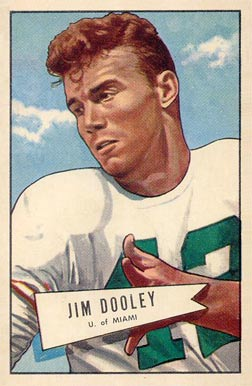
- Dooley's 1952 rookie Bowman football card

No. 43
- Positions: End, flanker

Personal information
- Born: February 8, 1930; Stoutsville, Missouri, U.S.
- Died: January 8, 2008 (aged 77); Lake Forest, Illinois, U.S.
- Listed height: 6 ft 4 in (1.93 m)
- Listed weight: 198 lb (90 kg)

Career information
- High school: Miami Senior (Miami, Florida)
- College: Miami (FL) (1949–1951)
- NFL draft: 1952: 1st round, 8th overall pick

Career history

Playing
- Chicago Bears (1952–1961)

Coaching
- Chicago Bears (1963–1965) Wide receivers coach; Chicago Bears (1966–1967) Defensive coordinator; Chicago Bears (1968–1971) Head coach; Buffalo Bills (1972) Linebackers coach; Southern California Sun (1974) Assistant coach; Chicago Bears (1981) Offensive consultant; Chicago Bears (1982–1989) Research & quality control

Awards and highlights
- As a player: 100 greatest Bears of All-Time; Second-team All-American (1951); Miami Hurricanes No. 42 retired; As a coach: Super Bowl champion (XX); NFL champion (1963)

Career NFL statistics
- Receptions: 211
- Receiving yards: 3,172
- Receiving touchdowns: 16
- Stats at Pro Football Reference

Head coaching record
- Career: 20–36 (.357)
- Coaching profile at Pro Football Reference

James William Dooley (February 8, 1930 – January 8, 2008) was an American professional football player and coach. He played in the National Football League (NFL) as an end and flanker for the Chicago Bears.

== Early life and education ==
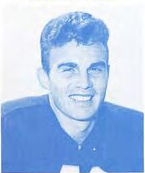
Dooley in 1951

Dooley was born in Stoutsville, Missouri, on February 8, 1930, and grew up in Miami, where he attended and graduated from Miami High School in 1948. He originally wanted to pursue a career in medicine at Vanderbilt University, but attended the nearby University of Miami after then head coach Andy Gustafson agreed to have the school pay his way through medical school.

In his college football career with the Miami Hurricanes, he played on both sides of the ball and put together an outstanding career, winning All-American honors and was the first player in school history to have his number retired. Possessing great speed, he capped his senior year with four interceptions against Clemson University in the Gator Bowl on New Year's Day and was selected in the first round of the 1952 NFL draft by the Bears, eighth overall.

== Professional career ==
In his first year in the NFL, Dooley saw little time on offense, but collected five interceptions. In 1953, he became an important part of the team's passing attack with 53 receptions and four touchdowns, showing a flair for faking out defenders while also popularizing the down-and-out pass. After 34 catches and seven touchdowns in 1954, Dooley's career took a detour when he missed much of the next two seasons by serving the U.S. Air Force. He joined the team on November 28, 1956, and played in their final three games, helping the team reach the NFL Championship Game against the New York Giants.

Teaming with fellow wideout Harlon Hill, Dooley hauled in 37 passes, but only reached the end zone once during the 1957 season. He then missed the entire 1958 campaign when he was forced to the sidelines with an ankle injury, but returned in 1959 with 41 catches. After following that performance with 36 receptions in 1960, Dooley made plans to retire, but changed his mind, catching only six passes the following year.

== NFL career statistics ==
Legend
	Led the league
**Bold**	Career high

=== Regular season ===
Year	Team	Games		Receiving				
Year	Team	GP	GS	Rec	Yds	Avg	Lng	TD
1952	CHI	12	12	0	0	0.0	0	0
1953	CHI	12	11	**53**	**841**	15.9	**72**	4
1954	CHI	12	10	34	658	**19.4**	69	**7**
1956	CHI	3	0	4	47	11.8	15	0
1957	CHI	12	12	37	530	14.3	32	1
1959	CHI	12	10	41	580	14.1	41	3
1960	CHI	12	12	36	426	11.8	28	1
1961	CHI	6	2	6	90	15.0	25	0
Career		81	69	211	3,172	15.0	72	16

=== Playoffs ===
Year	Team	Games		Receiving				
Year	Team	GP	GS	Rec	Yds	Avg	Lng	TD
1956	CHI	1	0	6	66	11.0	15	0
Career		1	0	6	66	11.0	15	0

== Coaching career ==
After competing during the 1962 preseason, Dooley officially retired, but he was soon added as an assistant coach. Three years as the team's wide receivers coach were followed in 1966 by his elevation to the role of the team's defensive coordinator. The move followed the departure of George Allen to Los Angeles, with Dooley quickly becoming known for his innovative strategies. These included flip-flopping the team's defensive tackles during that first year, then using five men in the defensive backfield on third down in 1967, which became known as "the Dooley Shift" and now is referred to as the nickel defense.

In February 1968, Dooley was returned to the offensive side of the ball, but that status changed just months later when 73-year-old George Halas announced his retirement as head coach on May 27 due to arthritis. Dooley, 38, was promoted and introduced as head coach the following day.

The Bears won half of their games that season, but the team collapsed the following year with a franchise-worst 1–13 record. The lone win that year came at midseason against the league's other 1–13 team, the Pittsburgh Steelers. In November, running back Brian Piccolo was diagnosed with cancer, and died the following June.

In 1970, the Bears improved by five games to finish with a 6–8 record, and appeared to be on track for major improvement the following year by winning five of their first seven games, including a 23–19 victory in week seven over the eventual Super Bowl champion Dallas Cowboys. However, the second half of the campaign proved to be a disaster, with just one win in the final seven contests, including a 34–3 humiliation on Monday Night Football on November 29 to the other Super Bowl participant, the Miami Dolphins. It was the second of five consecutive losses to conclude the season. The inevitable result of the 1971 collapse came a month later when Dooley was fired on December 29, the first Bears coach ever to suffer that fate.

Dooley soon signed as the linebacker coach for the Buffalo Bills, but resigned after just one season. After sitting out the 1973 season, Dooley was named an assistant with the fledgling World Football League's Southern California Sun. The job came just one week after he had filed for bankruptcy, citing nearly half a million dollars in debts, including $320,000 to former Bear player and assistant Sid Luckman. In a parallel of his personal problems, Dooley's job ended with the financial problems of the league, at which point he went to work for Luckman at Cellucraft, as a national account sales manager for flexible packaging products, for the next five years.

On October 12, 1981, he was rehired by the Bears as an offensive consultant, a decision that caused conflict with the team's coaching staff, causing them to consider him something of a spy for management. After the conclusion of the season, Dooley and all the other coaches were dismissed, but the team's new head coach Mike Ditka, who had played under Dooley two decades earlier, hired him to scout game film of upcoming opponents.

Dooley flourished in his new job, aiding the Bears's rise and playing a part in their dominating 1985 season that was capped with a 46–10 victory over the New England Patriots in Super Bowl XX.

In 1997, he was honored by his alma mater with a spot in the Miami Hurricanes' Ring of Honor.

== Death ==
Dooley battled amyotrophic lateral sclerosis (ALS, Lou Gehrig's disease) for his last ten years, and died at Lake Forest Hospital in 2008, one month before his 78th birthday. Buried at Rosehill Cemetery in Chicago, he was survived by his wife, daughter, four sons, and 16 grandchildren.

== Head coaching record ==
=== NFL ===
Team	Year	Regular season					Postseason			
Team	Year	Won	Lost	Ties	Win %	Finish	Won	Lost	Win %	Result
CHI	1968	7	7	0	.500		–	–	–	–
CHI	1969	1	13	0	.071		–	–	–	–
CHI	1970	6	8	0	.429		–	–	–	–
CHI	1971	6	8	0	.429		–	–	–	–
CHI total		20	36	0	.357		–	–	–	–
Total		20	36	0	.357		–	–	–	–
