= Mike Hull (fullback) =

American football player (born 1945)

No. 33, 25
- Position: Running back

Personal information
- Born: January 2, 1945 (age 81); Glendale, California, U.S.
- Listed height: 6 ft 3 in (1.91 m)
- Listed weight: 220 lb (100 kg)

Career information
- High school: Crescenta Valley (La Crescenta-Montrose, California)
- College: USC
- NFL draft: 1968: 1st round, 16th overall pick

Career history
- Chicago Bears (1968–1970); Washington Redskins (1971–1974)

Awards and highlights
- National champion (1967)

Career NFL statistics
- Rushing yards: 207
- Rushing average: 2.7
- Receptions: 29
- Receiving yards: 127
- Total touchdowns: 1
- Stats at Pro Football Reference

Michael Bruce Hull (born January 2, 1945) is an American lawyer and former professional football player in the National Football League (NFL). He played for the Chicago Bears and the Washington Redskins. He played college football at the University of Southern California and was one of five USC Trojans players taken in the first round of the 1968 NFL/AFL draft after his senior year.

== Biography ==
Hull started his football career at 14 years old on the bench, as a reserve offensive tackle for Clark Junior H.S., which is now Crescenta Valley High School ("CVHS"). When in tenth grade, Hull was moved to starting tight-end, and defensive end. In his junior year, as the Falcon team began its first year of varsity football, Hull was moved to tailback by Head Coach Gary Hess, in the Falcon's single-wing offense. He returned the opening kickoff 88 yards for a touchdown the first time he touched the ball in a varsity regular season game and gained 142 yards rushing on just ten carries, not including his kickoff return.

In his senior year at CVHS Hull earned First-team All-League honors, amassing over 1,000 yards total offense. In the last game beating Burbank HS, Mike had 137 yds. rushing, on 20 carries, with just 70 yds passing. He also ran the high and low hurdles, long jumped and ran the relays on the Falcon track team. At the close of his career at CVHS Hull was also the student body president, and held every Falcon varsity football rushing and total offense record.

He was recruited by several university teams but decided to start locally at Glendale College and gain some experience in the T-formation, where he matured into a versatile fullback/halfback. He was named the offensive MVP Running Back, and All-Conference, on Glendale's Western Conference Championship Bowl team, before heading to the University of Southern California in the spring to run track as a Trojan freshman.

At USC, Hull converted to full-time fullback, working himself into a starting role for the Trojans for three years, playing on two Rose Bowl teams and the 1967 USC National Championship Team. Between his sophomore year blocking for Heisman Trophy winner, Mike Garrett, and his senior year blocking for future Heisman winner O. J. Simpson, Hull led the USC Rose Bowl team in rushing avg. with 6.7 yds. per carry, winning the "Roy Bullet Baker" award as the Trojans' Most Valuable back. He was also selected as the Most Valuable Player in the USC vs. UCLA game, while rushing for 147 yds on 14 carries against the Bruins.

=== Professional career ===
Hull was selected in the first round of the 1968 NFL draft by the Chicago Bears, the 16th player selected. He played for the Bears for three years, suffering through the Brian Piccolo tragedy, though helping All Pro and future Hall of Famer Gale Sayers, as the lead blocker.

In 1971 Hull was traded to the Washington Redskins for three players, joining coach George Allen's "Over-the-Hill-Gang". He played in 86 consecutive games with the Redskins over five NFL seasons, six NFL playoff games, the NFL Championship and the Super Bowl, where he was a Special Teams leader.

== Law career ==
After seven years in the NFL, Hull started his law school education at Georgetown University Law Center in Washington, D.C., earning his Juris Doctor degree in 1979. He became an Assistant Corporation Counsel for the District of Columbia, and then became an Assistant US Attorney for the US, a prosecutor for the United States. Mike joined Coldwell Banker in 1989 guiding the Southwest team. He retired in July 2020.

== Personal life ==
Mike now resides in San Clemente, California, with wife Connie, a former lawyer representing the NFL, and their daughter Michelle, who graduated magna cum laude from Harvard University and from Columbia Law School, in New York. His son, Ernie, from a prior marriage, graduated from Cal Poly San Luis Obispo, has his Masters from Pepperdine University. His other son Thomas was born in Southern California.
