= Ross Montgomery (American football) =

American football player (born 1946)

No. 22
- Position: Running back

Personal information
- Born: December 10, 1946 (age 79); Detroit, Michigan, U.S.
- Listed height: 6 ft 3 in (1.91 m)
- Listed weight: 220 lb (100 kg)

Career information
- High school: Midland (Midland, Texas)
- College: TCU (1965-1968)
- NFL draft: 1969: 3rd round, 66th overall pick

Career history
- Chicago Bears (1969–1970)

Career NFL statistics
- Rushing yards: 281
- Rushing average: 3.6
- Receptions: 16
- Receiving yards: 83
- Stats at Pro Football Reference

Ross Elliott Montgomery (born December 10, 1946) is an American former professional football player who was a running back for the Chicago Bears of the National Football League (NFL). He played college football for the TCU Horned Frogs.

After his NFL career, he was a judge.
