= Brian Piccolo =

American football player (1943–1970)

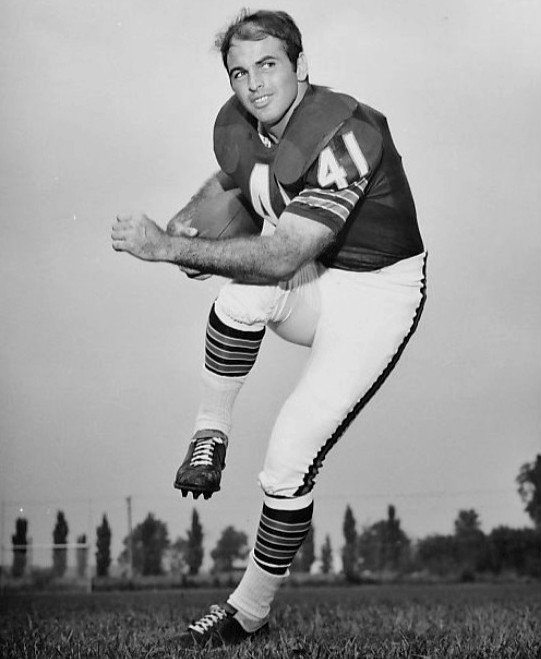
- Piccolo in 1967

No. 41
- Position: Halfback

Personal information
- Born: October 31, 1943; Pittsfield, Massachusetts, U.S.
- Died: June 16, 1970 (aged 26); New York, New York, U.S.
- Listed height: 6 ft 0 in (1.83 m)
- Listed weight: 205 lb (93 kg)

Career information
- High school: St. Thomas Aquinas (Fort Lauderdale, Florida)
- College: Wake Forest (1961–1964)
- NFL draft: 1965: undrafted

Career history
- Chicago Bears (1965–1969)

Awards and highlights
- Chicago Bears No. 41 retired; Second-team All-American (1964); ACC Player of the Year (1964); First-team All-ACC (1964); Wake Forest Demon Deacons No. 31 retired

Career NFL statistics
- Rushing yards: 927
- Rushing average: 3.6
- Rushing touchdowns: 4
- Receptions: 58
- Receiving yards: 537
- Receiving touchdowns: 1
- Stats at Pro Football Reference

Louis Brian Piccolo (October 31, 1943 – June 16, 1970) was an American professional football player who was a halfback for the Chicago Bears of the National Football League (NFL) for four years. He played college football for the Wake Forest Demon Deacons. He died at age 26 from embryonal cell carcinoma, an aggressive form of germ cell testicular cancer, first diagnosed after it had spread to his chest cavity.

Piccolo was the subject of the 1971 TV movie Brian's Song, with a remake TV movie of the same name filmed in 2001. He was portrayed in the original film by James Caan and by Sean Maher in the 2001 remake.

== Early life ==
Piccolo was born in Pittsfield, Massachusetts, the youngest of three sons of Joseph and Irene Piccolo. The family moved south to Fort Lauderdale, Florida, when Piccolo was three, due to his parents' concerns for his brother Don's health. Piccolo and his brothers were athletes, and he was a star running back on his high school football team, although he considered baseball his primary sport. He graduated from the former Central Catholic High School (now St. Thomas Aquinas High School) in Fort Lauderdale in 1961.

Piccolo played college football at Wake Forest in Winston-Salem, North Carolina; his only other scholarship offer was from Wichita State. He led the nation in rushing and scoring during his senior season in 1964 and was named the Atlantic Coast Conference (ACC) Player of the Year yet went unselected in both the AFL and NFL drafts.

In the balloting for the Heisman Trophy won by John Huarte of Notre Dame, Piccolo was tenth, just ahead of Joe Namath of Alabama and future teammate Gale Sayers of Kansas.

A season earlier in 1963, Darryl Hill of the University of Maryland was the first and only African-American football player in the ACC. According to Lee Corso, a Maryland assistant coach at that time, Wake Forest had "the worst atmosphere" of any campus the Maryland football team visited. Piccolo went over to the Maryland bench, walked Hill over to the area in front of the student section and put his arm around him, silencing the crowd.

Following his spectacular senior season, Piccolo married his high school sweetheart, Joy Murrath, on December 26, 1964. They had three daughters: Lori, Traci, and Kristi.

== Professional career ==
Because he was not selected in the 1965 NFL draft or AFL draft, Piccolo tried out for the Chicago Bears as a free agent. He made the team for the 1965 season, but only on the taxi squad (known today as the practice squad), meaning he could practice but not suit up for games. In 1966, he made the main roster but his playing time was primarily on special teams. In 1967 he got more playing time backing up superstar starting tailback Gale Sayers, which increased after Sayers' knee injury in November 1968. Piccolo's biggest statistical year was 1968, during which he posted career bests with 450 yards on 123 carries (a 3.7 average), two touchdowns, and 28 receptions for 291 yards (a 10.4 average).

In 1969, Piccolo was moved up to starting fullback, with Sayers returning as halfback, placing the two in the same backfield on offense.

Players at that time were still segregated by race for hotel-room assignments. At the suggestion of the Bears' captain, the policy was changed and each player was reassigned by position, so that wide receivers would room together, quarterbacks would room together, etc. Running back was the only position of the 1969 Bears with one black and one white player, Sayers and Piccolo, respectively.

== Cancer and death ==
The Bears were in the midst of a 1–13 season in 1969, the worst record in their history. Piccolo had earned a place in the starting lineup as an undersized fullback. Their only win came in the eighth game on November 9, a 38–7 home win over struggling Pittsburgh. Piccolo opened the scoring at Wrigley Field with a 25-yard touchdown reception in the first quarter. The next week in Atlanta, he scored a fourth-quarter touchdown on a one-yard run, and then voluntarily removed himself from the game, something he had never done, raising great concern among his teammates and coaches. Breathing while playing had become extremely difficult for him, so when the team returned to Chicago, he was promptly sent for a medical examination at which he was diagnosed with embryonal cell carcinoma.

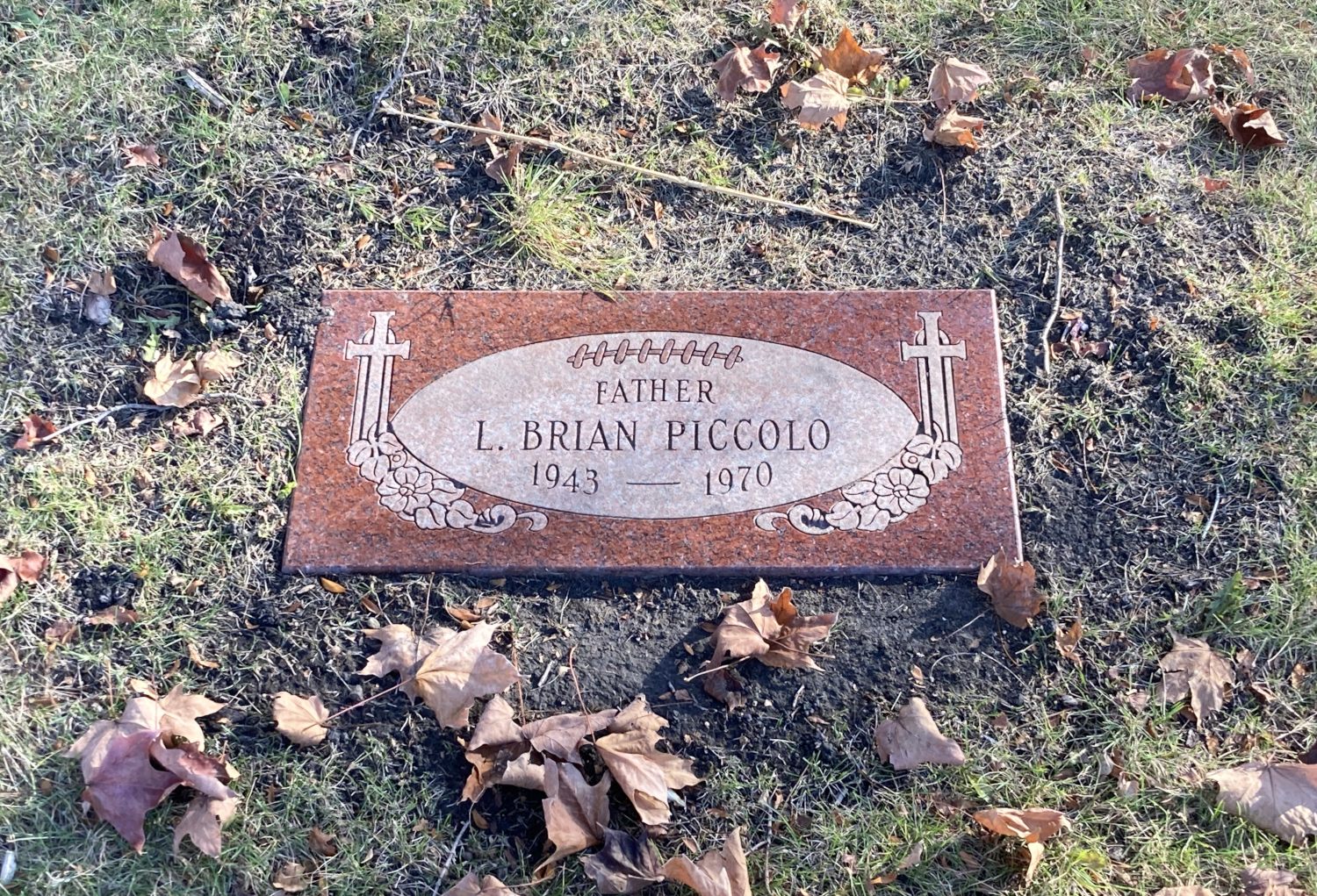
Piccolo's grave at Saint Mary Catholic Cemetery

Soon after initial surgery at Sloan-Kettering in Manhattan, New York to remove the tumor, he underwent a second procedure in April 1970 to remove his left lung and left pectoral muscle. Bothered by continuing chest pain afterward, he was re-admitted to the hospital in early June where doctors determined the cancer had spread to other organs, particularly his liver. He died in the early morning of June 16 at the age of 26. The month before Piccolo's death, Gale Sayers accepted the George S. Halas Award for Most Courageous Player and told the crowd they had selected the wrong person for the award. He said, "I love Brian Piccolo, and I'd like all of you to love him, too. Tonight, when you hit your knees to pray, please ask God to love him, too."

Dick Butkus, Randy Jackson, Ralph Kurek, Ed O'Bradovich, Mike Pyle, and Gale Sayers were the six Bears teammates who served as pallbearers at Piccolo's funeral at Christ the King Catholic Church in Chicago on June 19. He was buried at Saint Mary Catholic Cemetery in Evergreen Park, Illinois.

== Legacy ==
- In 1972, Brian Piccolo Middle School 53 opened in Queens, New York on Nameoke Street in Far Rockaway. The school name was chosen by students after the first airing of Brian's Song. The football jersey that belonged to Brian Piccolo that was displayed in the lobby has been missing since the school was renovated in the late 1990s.
- In August 1973, Orr Middle School, located on the West Side of Chicago on Keeler Avenue, was renamed after Piccolo to the Brian Piccolo Specialty School.
- In 1980, students at Wake Forest, Piccolo's alma mater, began the Brian Piccolo Cancer Fund Drive in his memory. They raised money for the Comprehensive Cancer Center at the Bowman Gray Medical Center of Wake Forest University. In addition, the Brian Piccolo Student Volunteer Program was established to provide undergraduates with an opportunity to work at the Cancer Center as volunteers. A residence hall at Wake Forest is also named in his honor.
- In memory of Piccolo's accomplishments, the St. Thomas Aquinas High School football stadium in Fort Lauderdale is named after him. At the end of every football game, the school's marching band plays "The Hands of Time", the theme from Brian's Song.
- The Piccolo Family has sponsored an endowment in Brian Piccolo's name for cancer research at Rush University Medical Center in Chicago. The current chair is Dr. Melody Cobleigh.
- Brian Piccolo Sports Park and Velodrome in Cooper City, Florida, a Fort Lauderdale suburb, is named for him.
- Comcast SportsNet profiled Piccolo's legacy and the lasting impression he left in the June 2007 episode of 'net Impact.
- Each season since 1972, the Atlantic Coast Conference has awarded the Brian Piccolo Award to the conference's "Most Courageous Player". In 2007, the recipient was Matt Robinson of Wake Forest, the fourth player from Piccolo's alma mater to be given the award; Wake Forest Quarterback Sam Hartman became the sixth in 2022. Since 1970, the Chicago Bears have also handed out an award by the same name to a rookie and (since 1992) a veteran who "best exemplifies the courage, loyalty, teamwork, dedication and sense of humor" of Piccolo. The winners are chosen by the Bears' veteran players.
- An Italian-American organization named UNICO (an acronym for Unity, Neighborliness, Integrity, Charity, and Opportunity) honors his memory each year by awarding the Brian Piccolo Award to courageous and outstanding athletes of Italian-American heritage. In 2009 Brian's brother Don attended his first UNICO award ceremony in Rivervale, New Jersey, where he delivered a speech.
- The Chicago Bears honored Piccolo by retiring his jersey number 41.

== Brian's Song ==
The film Brian's Song, loosely based on Gale Sayers' autobiography, tells the story of the friendship between Brian Piccolo and Gale Sayers and their time together while playing football for the Chicago Bears, up until Piccolo's death. It first aired Tuesday, November 30, 1971, on ABC, less than 18 months after his death, and starred James Caan as Piccolo and Billy Dee Williams as Sayers. The movie was seen by 55 million viewers, half of the U.S. population that owned televisions at that time. Its success on television led to it also being later shown in theaters.

A remake aired in 2001 on ABC's The Wonderful World of Disney, and starred Mekhi Phifer as Sayers and Sean Maher as Piccolo.

== Biography ==
Piccolo's biography, Brian Piccolo: A Short Season, was written by Jeannie Morris (a journalist whose husband was former Bears teammate Johnny Morris) and featured passages written by Piccolo himself for a planned autobiography.

== See also ==
- List of NCAA major college football yearly rushing leaders
- List of NCAA major college football yearly scoring leaders
- List of gridiron football players who died during their careers
