= Emilio Vallez =

American football player (born 1946)

No. 82
- Position: Tight end

Personal information
- Born: April 30, 1946 (age 80); Veguita, New Mexico, U.S.
- Listed height: 6 ft 2 in (1.88 m)
- Listed weight: 210 lb (95 kg)

Career information
- High school: Belen (Belen, New Mexico)
- College: New Mexico
- NFL draft: 1968: 12th round, 316th overall pick

Career history
- Chicago Bears (1968–1969)

Awards and highlights
- First-team All-WAC (1967)
- Stats at Pro Football Reference

Emilio Fidel Vallez (born April 30, 1946) is an American former professional football player who was a tight end for the Chicago Bears of the National Football League (NFL). He played college football for the New Mexico Lobos.

== College football career ==
Vallez played for the New Mexico Lobos from 1964 to 1967, lettering in his last three years.

On October 8, 1966, during a game against Arizona, Vallez caught an 89-yard pass from quarterback Rick Beitler, setting a New Mexico record for longest passing play at the time. As of 2017, this was still the third-longest passing play in New Mexico history.

Vallez also set New Mexico records for most receptions (17) and receiving yards (257) in one game during a 56–7 blowout win over UTEP on October 27, 1967. Both of these records still stood as of 2017.

In 1967, Vallez made first-team all-WAC and was the only New Mexico player that year who achieved that honor. He was also recognized as New Mexico's most valuable player that season.

== NFL career ==
Vallez was selected in the twelfth round of the 1968 NFL/AFL draft by the Chicago Bears of the NFL. He played in nine games with the Bears over two seasons: six games in 1968 and three games in 1969.

== Personal life ==
Vallez is the uncle of KRQE news anchor Kim Vallez.
