= Willie Roberts (American football, born 1948) =

American football player (born 1948)

No. 24
- Position: Defensive back

Personal information
- Born: June 28, 1948 (age 78); Colquitt, Georgia, U.S.
- Listed height: 6 ft 1 in (1.85 m)
- Listed weight: 190 lb (86 kg)

Career information
- High school: Monroe
- College: Houston
- NFL draft: 1972: 13th round, 318th overall pick

Career history
- Houston Oilers (1972)*; Dallas Cowboys (1973)*; Chicago Bears (1973); Chicago Winds (1975)
- * Offseason or practice squad member only
- Stats at Pro Football Reference

Willie Lee Roberts (born June 28, 1948) is an American former professional football player who was a defensive back for the Chicago Bears of National Football League (NFL). He played college football for the University of Houston.
