= Dan Pride =

American football player (born 1942)

No. 57
- Position: Linebacker

Personal information
- Born: June 7, 1942 (age 84); Ironton, Ohio, U.S.
- Listed height: 6 ft 3 in (1.91 m)
- Listed weight: 225 lb (102 kg)

Career information
- High school: Ironton
- College: Jackson State
- AFL draft: 1966: 10th round, 90th overall pick

Career history
- San Diego Chargers (1966)*; Chicago Bears (1967–1969); Southern California Sun (1974)
- * Offseason or practice squad member only
- Stats at Pro Football Reference

Daniel M. Pride (born June 7, 1942) is an American former professional football player who was a linebacker for the Chicago Bears of the National Football League (NFL). He played college football for the Jackson State University
