= Ralph Kurek =

American football player (born 1943)

No. 32
- Position: Running back

Personal information
- Born: February 23, 1943 (age 83); Milwaukee, Wisconsin, U.S.
- Listed height: 6 ft 2 in (1.88 m)
- Listed weight: 210 lb (95 kg)

Career information
- High school: Watertown
- College: Wisconsin
- NFL draft: 1965: 20th round, 269th overall pick

Career history
- Chicago Bears (1965–1970)
- Stats at Pro Football Reference

Ralph Kurek (born February 23, 1943) is a former player in the National Football League (NFL) for the Chicago Bears from 1965 to 1970 as a running back. He played at the collegiate level at the University of Wisconsin–Madison.

== Biography ==
Kurek was born Ralph Elmer Kurek on February 23, 1943, in Milwaukee, Wisconsin. His family later moved to Watertown, Wisconsin, and he played high school football for Watertown High School.

== College career ==
Ralph Kurek was recruited by coach Milt Bruhn out of Watertown high school to play college football at Wisconsin. Kurek appeared in 9 games in 1962, rushing for 367 yards on 67 carries. Wisconsin went 6–1 in conference, and 8–2 overall, good enough to be ranked second in the AP poll. With the graduation of starting quarterback Ron Vander Kelen, Wisconsin relied more on the ground game. Going through a bevy of starting quarterbacks, Wisconsin stumbled to a 5–4 overall finish. Kurek carried the 84 times, but could only muster 262 yards behind an offensive line that featured new starters as well. In hi senior season, Kurek carried the ball 103 times for 325. Wisconsin again finished the season in the second division with a losing record.

Playing high school football, Kurek dream of going to Notre Dame, but no scholarship offer ever arrived. In 1963, Kurek would get vindication. With under seven minutes left in the game, and Wisconsin trailing 9-7, the Badgers put together a drive. They went 80 yards in 14 plays. The winning score would come from Kurek, a one-yard scamper that put the Badgers ahead for good.

== Professional career ==
With their final selection of the 1965 NFL draft, the Chicago Bears drafted Kurek in the 20th round. In his rookie season, Kurek played sparingly. He only had one carry for zero yards. His little playing time was as a result of a deep Bears bench at running back. The Bears already had Gale Sayers, Andy Livingston and Ronnie Bull to handle the majority of the carries.

Still buried deep on the depth chart, Bears Head Coach George Halas deployed Kurek as a receiver during the 1966 NFL season. Kurek caught 10 passes for 178 yards, all career highs. He also had 52 carries for 1789 yards and a score. All once again, career highs. The following season, Kurek started five games, but was reduced to essentially a role player. Halas was devoting more playing time to another running back, Brian Piccolo. However, Kurek remained a duel threat for the Bears, seeing time at both running back and in the slot. After the 1970 season, Kurek retired from the NFL.

== See also ==
- List of Chicago Bears players
