= Roger Lawson =

American football player (born 1949)

No. 36
- Position: Running back

Personal information
- Born: September 28, 1949 (age 77); Detroit, Michigan, U.S.
- Listed height: 6 ft 2 in (1.88 m)
- Listed weight: 215 lb (98 kg)

Career information
- High school: Southwestern (Detroit)
- College: Western Michigan
- NFL draft: 1972: 15th round, 377th overall pick

Career history
- Chicago Bears (1972–1973)

Career NFL statistics
- Rushing attempts: 57
- Rushing yards: 176
- Rushing TDs: 1
- Receptions: 17
- Receiving yards: 180
- Stats at Pro Football Reference

Roger Lawson (born September 28, 1949) is an American former professional football player who was a running back for the Chicago Bears of the National Football League (NFL) from 1972 to 1973. He played college football for the Western Michigan Broncos.
