= Austin Denney =

American football player (1944–2009)

No. 84
- Position: Tight end

Personal information
- Born: January 2, 1944; Nashville, Tennessee, U.S.
- Died: January 20, 2009 (aged 65); Knoxville, Tennessee, U.S.
- Listed height: 6 ft 2 in (1.88 m)
- Listed weight: 230 lb (104 kg)

Career information
- High school: Donelson (Nashville)
- College: Tennessee (1962–1966)
- NFL draft: 1966: 11th round, 160th overall pick
- AFL draft: 1966: Red Shirt 2nd round, 14th overall pick

Career history
- Dallas Cowboys (1967)*; Chicago Bears (1967–1969); Buffalo Bills (1970–1971)
- * Offseason or practice squad member only

Awards and highlights
- First-team All-American (1966); Second-team All-SEC (1966)

Career NFL statistics
- Receptions: 71
- Receiving yards: 764
- Touchdowns: 3
- Stats at Pro Football Reference

Austin Cheek Denney Jr. (January 2, 1944 – January 20, 2009) was an American professional football tight end in the National Football League (NFL) for the Chicago Bears and Buffalo Bills. He played college football at the University of Tennessee.

== Early life ==
Denney attended Donelson High School, where he lettered in football, basketball and baseball. He accepted a football scholarship from the University of Tennessee.

As a junior, he was moved from fullback to tight end, becoming a starter, while posting 14 receptions for 206 yards and 2 touchdowns. As a senior, he posted 21 receptions for 264 yards and 7 receiving touchdowns (school record for tight ends). He finished his college career with 35 receptions for 470 yards and 9 touchdowns (school record for tight ends).

== Professional career ==
Denney was selected by the Dallas Cowboys in the eleventh round (160th overall) of the 1966 NFL draft with a future draft pick, which allowed the team to draft him before his college eligibility was over. He also was selected in the redshirt round 2 (14th overall) of the 1966 AFL draft. On September 6, 1967, he was traded along with Mac Percival to the Chicago Bears in exchange for a third round draft choice (#71-Ed Harmon).

In 1967, Denney became a starter at tight end for the Chicago Bears. His best season was 1968, when he registered 23 receptions for 247 yards and two touchdowns. He was released on September 1, 1970.

On September 2, 1970, he was claimed off waivers by the Buffalo Bills. He was named the starter at tight end, making 14 receptions for 201 yards. He was released on September 15, 1971.

== Personal life ==
On January 20, 2009, he died from an undisclosed illness.
