= Mac Percival =

American football player (born 1940)

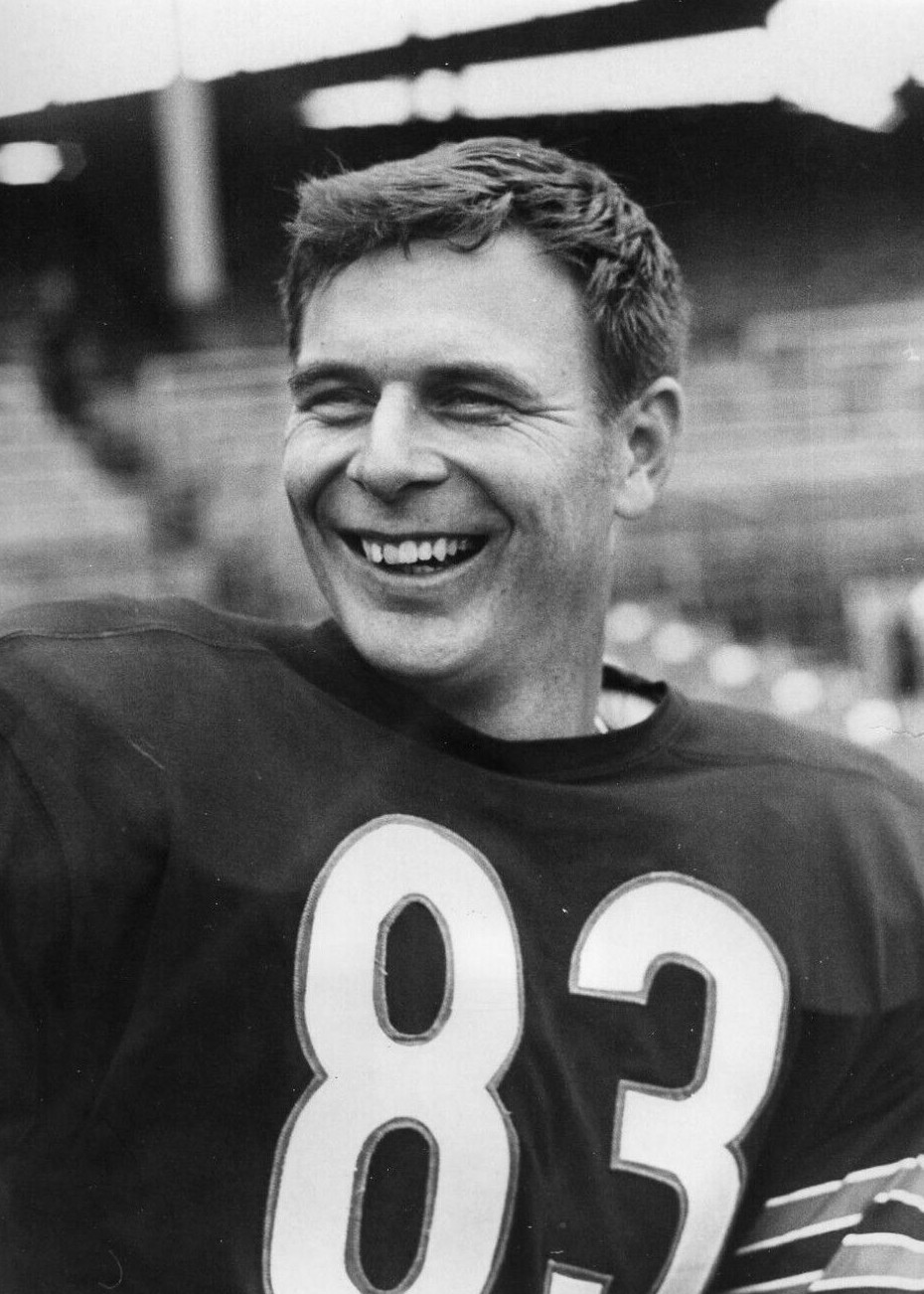
- Percival, circa 1968

No. 83, 11
- Position: Placekicker

Personal information
- Born: February 26, 1940 (age 86); Vernon, Texas, U.S.
- Listed height: 6 ft 4 in (1.93 m)
- Listed weight: 220 lb (100 kg)

Career information
- High school: Vernon
- College: Texas Tech
- NFL draft: 1967: undrafted

Career history
- Dallas Cowboys (1967)*; Chicago Bears (1967–1973); Dallas Cowboys (1974)
- * Offseason or practice squad member only

Career NFL statistics
- Field goals: 101/190
- Field goal %: 53.2
- Longest field goal: 50
- Stats at Pro Football Reference

Mac Percival (February 26, 1940 - September 17, 2026) was an American former professional football player who was a placekicker in the National Football League (NFL) for the Chicago Bears and Dallas Cowboys. He played college basketball for the Texas Tech Red Raiders.

== Early life ==
Percival attended Vernon High School. He used a straight-away style as one of the kickers for the football team, but was only involved in kickoffs and extra points. He also lettered in basketball, which was his main sport.

He accepted a basketball scholarship from Texas Tech University, but did not play football during his time in college.

== Professional career ==
=== Dallas Cowboys (first stint) ===
In the '60s, the Dallas Cowboys employed a kicking caravan search to unearth potential kickers. Percival was signed as an undrafted free agent after the 1967 NFL/AFL draft, based on his performance in one of those searches, even though he never played a down of college football and had spent four years after college as a high school teacher.

On September 6, 1967, he was traded along with tight end Austin Denney to the Chicago Bears in exchange for a third round draft choice (#71-Ed Harmon).

=== Chicago Bears ===
In 1967, the Chicago Bears acquired Percival to replace kicker Roger LeClerc. In his rookie season, he made 13 out of 26 field goals after appearing in 14 games.

In 1968, with the coaching help of Ben Agajanian, he refined his technique and went on to make 25 out of 36 field goals, while scoring 100 points and becoming only the third player in franchise history to achieve that mark in a season. He is also the last Bears kicker to make five field goals in a game, which he accomplished against the Philadelphia Eagles on October 10, during a 29–16 win.

During his tenure with the Bears, he made 99 out of 182 field goals (54.4%) and scored 456 points.

=== Dallas Cowboys (second stint) ===
On September 10, 1974, he was acquired by the Dallas Cowboys to replace George Hunt. He only lasted three games before being replaced by Efren Herrera.

== Free kick ==
In 1968, the Bears were facing their longtime rival Green Bay Packers. With :26 remaining in the game with the score tied at 10–10, Bears returner Cecil Turner fair-caught a Packers punt at the Packers 43-yard line. The Bears decided to kick the game-winning kick as a fair catch kick, which has rarely been done before. Percival was able to make the 43-yarder to win the game. The kick was Percival's second game-winner, as he kicked a 47-yarder with :03 left against their rival in Minnesota to give the Bears a 26–24 win at Wrigley Field the week before.

Four years later in a 1972 exhibition game against the Houston Oilers, Percival once again attempted a free kick. However, this time, the kick, which was 50 yards, missed. The Bears still won 20–17.
