= Bob Wallace (American football) =

American football player (born 1945)

No. 89
- Position: Wide receiver

Personal information
- Born: October 7, 1945 (age 81); Texarkana, Arkansas, U.S.
- Listed height: 6 ft 3 in (1.91 m)
- Listed weight: 211 lb (96 kg)

Career information
- High school: South Mountain (Phoenix, Arizona)
- College: UTEP
- NFL draft: 1968: 2nd round, 46th overall pick

Career history
- Chicago Bears (1968–1972)

Career NFL statistics
- Receptions: 109
- Receiving yards: 1,403
- Touchdowns: 9
- Stats at Pro Football Reference

Robert Charles Wallace (born October 7, 1945) is an American former professional football player who was a wide receiver and tight end in the National Football League (NFL). He was selected by the Chicago Bears in the second round of the 1968 NFL/AFL draft. He played college football for the UTEP Miners.
