= Gale Sayers =

American football player (1943–2020)

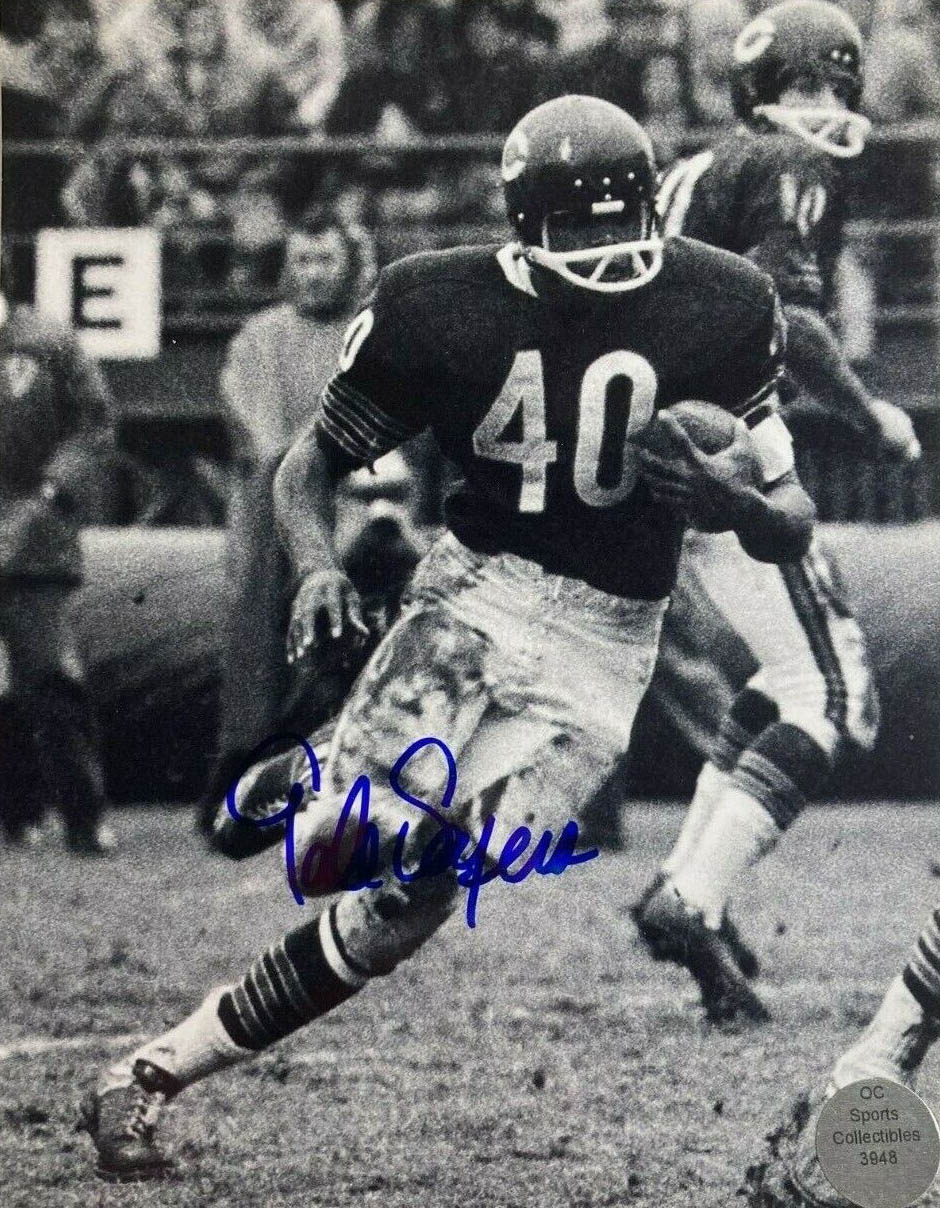
- Sayers playing for the Chicago Bears

No. 40
- Positions: Halfback; Return specialist

Personal information
- Born: May 30, 1943; Wichita, Kansas, U.S.
- Died: September 23, 2020 (aged 77); Wakarusa, Indiana, U.S.
- Listed height: 6 ft 0 in (1.83 m)
- Listed weight: 198 lb (90 kg)

Career information
- High school: Central (Omaha, Nebraska)
- College: Kansas (1962–1964)
- NFL draft: 1965: 1st round, 4th overall pick
- AFL draft: 1965: 1st round, 5th overall pick

Career history

Playing
- Chicago Bears (1965–1971)

Operations
- Southern Illinois (1976–1981) Athletic director; Tennessee State (1985–1986) Interim athletic director

Awards and highlights
- NFL Comeback Player of the Year (1969); NFL Offensive Rookie of the Year (1965); 5× First-team All-Pro (1965–1969); 4× Pro Bowl (1965–1967, 1969); 2× NFL rushing yards leader (1966, 1969); NFL scoring leader (1965); George Halas Award (1970); NFL 1960s All-Decade Team; NFL 50th Anniversary All-Time Team; NFL 75th Anniversary All-Time Team; NFL 100th Anniversary All-Time Team; Chicago Bears No. 40 retired; 100 greatest Bears of All-Time; 2× Consensus All-American (1963, 1964); 3× First-team All-Big Eight (1962–1964); Kansas Jayhawks No. 48 retired; NFL records: Most touchdowns in a rookie season: 22; Highest combined yards per game average, career: 138.75; Most all-purpose touchdowns in a single game: 6 (tied) (Note: Tied with Ernie Nevers and Alvin Kamara); Most yards per kick return (Note: Minimum 75 career kick returns.): 30.6

Career NFL statistics
- Rushing yards: 4,956
- Rushing average: 5
- Rushing touchdowns: 39
- Receptions: 112
- Receiving yards: 1,307
- Receiving touchdowns: 9
- Return yards: 3,172
- Return touchdowns: 8
- Stats at Pro Football Reference
- Pro Football Hall of Fame
- College Football Hall of Fame

Gale Eugene Sayers (May 30, 1943 – September 23, 2020) was an American professional football halfback and return specialist in the National Football League (NFL). Sayers played for the Chicago Bears from 1965 to 1971, though injuries effectively limited him to five seasons of play. Elusive, agile, and very fast, he was regarded by his peers as one of the most difficult players to tackle. Sayers was inducted into the Pro Football Hall of Fame in 1977 at age 34 and remains the youngest person to have received the honor.

Nicknamed "the Kansas Comet", Sayers played college football for the Kansas Jayhawks football team of the University of Kansas, where he compiled 4,020 all-purpose yards over three seasons and was twice recognized as a consensus All-American. In Sayers' rookie NFL season, he set a league record by scoring 22 touchdowns—including a record-tying six in one game—and gained 2,272 all-purpose yards en route to being named the NFL's Rookie of the Year. He continued this production through his first five seasons, earning four Pro Bowl appearances and five first-team All-Pro selections. A right knee injury forced Sayers to miss the final five games of the 1968, but he returned in 1969 to lead the NFL in rushing yards and be named the NFL Comeback Player of the Year. An injury to his left knee in the 1970 preseason as well as subsequent injuries kept him sidelined for most of his final two seasons.

His friendship with Bears teammate Brian Piccolo, who died of cancer in 1970, inspired Sayers to write his autobiography, I Am Third, which became the basis for the 1971 made-for-TV movie Brian's Song.

Sayers is one of five players in the Super Bowl era to be enshrined in the Hall of Fame without playing in a postseason game. He was named to the NFL's 75th Anniversary Team as a halfback and kick returner, the only player to occupy two positions on the team. In 2019, he was named to the NFL 100th Anniversary All-Time Team. For his achievements in college, Sayers was inducted into the College Football Hall of Fame the same year. His jersey number is retired by both the Bears and the University of Kansas. Following his NFL career, Sayers began a career in sports administration and business and served as the athletic director of Southern Illinois University from 1976 to 1981.

== Early life ==
Gale Eugene Sayers was born to Roger Earl Sayers and Bernice Ross in Wichita, Kansas, and raised in Omaha, Nebraska. His father was a mechanic for Goodyear, farmed, and worked for auto dealerships. Sayers' younger brother, Ron, later played running back for the San Diego Chargers of the American Football League. Roger, his older brother, was a decorated college track and field athlete. Gale graduated from Omaha Central High School, where he starred in football and track and field. A fine all-around track athlete, he set a state long jump record of 24 ft 10 1/2 in (7.58m) as a senior in 1961.

== College career ==
Sayers was recruited by several major Midwestern colleges before deciding to play football at the University of Kansas. While being interviewed during a broadcast of a Chicago Cubs game on September 8, 2010, Sayers said he had originally intended to go to the University of Iowa. Sayers said that he decided against going to Iowa after the Iowa head coach Jerry Burns did not have time to meet Sayers during his one campus visit. During his Jayhawks career, he rushed for 2,675 yards and gained a Big Eight Conference-record 4,020 all-purpose yards. He was three times recognized as a first-team All–Big Eight selection and was a consensus pick for the College Football All-America Team in both 1963 and 1964.

As a sophomore in 1962, his first year on the varsity team, Sayers led the Big Eight Conference and was third in the nation with 1,125 rushing yards. His 7.1 yards-per-carry average was the highest of any player in the NCAA that season. Against Oklahoma State, Sayers carried the ball 21 times for a conference single-game-record 283 yards to lead Kansas to a 36–17 comeback victory. In 1963, Sayers set an NCAA Division I FBS record with a 99-yard run against Nebraska. He finished the year with 917 rushing yards, again leading all rushers in the Big Eight. He earned first-team All-America recognition from the American Football Coaches Association (AFCA), the Football Writers Association of America (FWAA), the Newspaper Enterprise Association (NEA), The Sporting News, and United Press International (UPI), among others. In 1964, his senior year, he led the Jayhawks to a 15–14 upset victory over Oklahoma with a 93-yard return of the game's opening kickoff for a touchdown. He finished the year with 633 rushing yards, third most among Big Eight rushers, and also caught 17 passes for 178 yards, returned 15 punts for 138 yards, and returned seven kickoffs for 193 yards. He earned first-team All-America honors from each of the same selectors as in the previous year, in addition to the Associated Press (AP), among others.

== Professional career ==
=== 1965: Rookie season ===
Sayers was the fourth overall selection in the 1965 NFL draft, taken by the Chicago Bears, and was also picked fifth overall by the Kansas City Chiefs of the American Football League in the AFL draft. After consulting his wife, he decided he would rather play in Chicago, signing with George Halas's Bears. In his rookie year, Sayers scored an NFL-record 22 touchdowns: 14 rushing, six receiving, and one each on punt and kickoff returns. He gained 2,272 all-purpose yards, a record for an NFL rookie, with 1,371 of them coming from scrimmage. Sayers averaged 5.2 yards per rush and 17.5 yards per reception. His return averages were 14.9 yards per punt return and a league-high 31.4 yards per kickoff return.

Against the Minnesota Vikings on October 17, Sayers carried 13 times for 64 yards and a touchdown; caught four passes for 63 yards and two touchdowns, and had a 98-yard kickoff return touchdown in the 45–37 Bears victory. He was the last NFL player to score a rushing, receiving, and kickoff return touchdown in the same game until Tyreek Hill accomplished the feat over 50 years later in 2016. Bears coach Halas lauded Sayers after the game, saying, "I don't ever remember seeing a rookie back who was as good," and deemed his talents equal to former Bears greats Red Grange and George McAfee. "And remember," said Halas, "we used to call George 'One-Play McAfee'." On December 12, Sayers tied Ernie Nevers' and Dub Jones' record for touchdowns in a single game, scoring six in a 61–20 victory over the San Francisco 49ers that was played in muddy conditions at the Chicago Cubs' Wrigley Field. He accounted for 326 yards in the game: 113 rushing, 89 receiving, and 134 on punt returns. Sayers was the consensus choice for NFL Rookie of the Year honors from the AP, UPI, and NEA.

He was quoted as saying at the time:

Just give me 18 inches of daylight. That's all I need.

=== 1966: First rushing title ===
In his second season, Sayers led the league in rushing with 1,231 yards, averaging 5.4 yards per carry with eight touchdowns, and becoming the first Chicago Bears halfback to win the rushing title since 1949. He also led the Bears in receiving with 34 catches, 447 yards, and two more touchdowns. He surpassed his rookie season's kick return numbers, averaging 31.2 yards per return with two touchdowns. He also supplanted his all-purpose yards total from the previous season, gaining 2,440 to set the NFL record. The first of his kickoff return touchdowns that season came against the Los Angeles Rams, as he followed a wedge of blockers en route to a 93-yard score. Against the Minnesota Vikings in the Bears' final game of the season, and the first of Sayers' pro career with his parents in attendance, he carried 17 times for a franchise-record 197 yards after returning the opening kickoff 90 yards for a touchdown. Sayers was named to All-Pro first-teams by the AP, UPI, the NEA, The Sporting News, and the Pro Football Writers Association, among others. Starring in his second straight Pro Bowl, Sayers carried 11 times for 110 yards and was named the back of the game. The Bears finished the season with a 5–7–2 record, and the Chicago Tribune tabbed Sayers as "the one bright spot in Chicago's pro football year."

=== 1967: Shared workload ===
In Halas's final season as an NFL coach, Sayers again starred. Sharing more of the rushing duties with other backs, such as Brian Piccolo, Sayers gained 880 yards with a 4.7-yard average per carry. His receptions were down as well. He had three kickoff returns for touchdowns on 16 returns, averaging 37.7 yards per return. Only rarely returning punts—he returned three all season—Sayers still managed to return one for a score against the San Francisco 49ers, a game in which he also returned the opening kickoff 97 yards for a touchdown and scored a rushing touchdown on a rain-soaked field in San Francisco's Kezar Stadium. "It was a bad field, but it didn't stop some people," said 49ers coach Jack Christiansen of Sayers' performance. Christiansen said that after Sayers' kickoff return, he ordered that all punts go out of bounds. But Sayers received the punt and ran 58 yards through the middle of the field for the score. In a November game against the Detroit Lions, a cutback by Sayers caused future hall of fame cornerback Lem Barney to fall over, after which Sayers sprinted for a 63-yard gain. Later in the game he returned a kickoff 97 yards for a touchdown. After the season, Sayers was chosen for his third straight Pro Bowl, in which he returned a kickoff 75 yards and scored a three-yard rushing touchdown and again earned player of the game honors. Chicago finished in second place in the newly organized Central Division with a 7–6–1 record.

=== 1968–1969: Right knee injury and comeback season ===
Sayers had the most productive rushing yardage game of his career on November 3, 1968, against the Green Bay Packers, during which he carried 24 times for 205 yards. His season ended prematurely the following week against the 49ers' Kermit Alexander, when he tore several ligaments in his right knee including his anterior cruciate ligament, his medial collateral ligament, and his meniscus cartilage. Garry Lyle, the teammate nearest Sayers at the time, said, "I saw his eyes sort of glass over. I heard him holler. I knew he was hurt." Sayers had again been leading the league in rushing yards through the first nine games, and finished the year with 856 yards. After surgery, Sayers went through a physical rehabilitation program with the help of Piccolo, who had replaced him in the starting lineup. Despite missing the Bears' final five games, he earned first-team All-Pro recognition from several media outlets, including the AP, UPI, and NEA.

In the 1969 season, after a slow start and despite diminished speed and acceleration, Sayers led the league in rushing once again with 1,032 yards. He averaged 4.4 yards per carry and was the only player to gain over 1,000 rushing yards that year. He moved into second place on the Bears' all-time rushing yards list, passing Bronko Nagurski. Sayers was recognized as the NFL's Comeback Player of the Year by United Press International. The Bears, long past the Halas glory years, finished in last place with a franchise-worst 1–13 record. In his fourth and final Pro Bowl appearance, Sayers was the West's leading rusher and its leading receiver. For the third time in as many Pro Bowl performances, he was named the "Back of the Game".

=== 1970–1971: Left knee injury and retirement ===
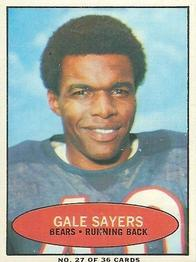
Gale Sayers, 1971, Bazooka Football Card

In the 1970 preseason, Sayers suffered a second knee injury, this time bone bruises to his left knee. Attempting to play through the injury in the opening game against the Giants, his production was severely limited. He sat out the next two games and returned in week 4 against the Vikings, but he was still visibly hampered, most evidently when he was unable to chase down Vikings defensive lineman Alan Page during a 65-yard fumble return. Sayers carried only six times for nine yards before further injuring his knee. He underwent surgery the following week and was deemed out for the remainder of the season. He had carried 23 times for 52 yards to that point. During his off time, Sayers took classes to become a stockbroker and became the first black stockbroker in his company's history. He also entered a Paine Webber program for 45 nationwide stockbroker trainees and placed second highest in sales.

After another knee operation and rehabilitation period, Sayers attempted a comeback in 1971. He was kept out of the first three games after carrying the ball only twice in the preseason, as Bears head coach Jim Dooley planned to slowly work him back into the rotation. His first game back was against the New Orleans Saints on October 10, in which he carried eight times for 30 yards. After the game, he told reporters he was satisfied with his performance and that his knee felt fine. The following week, against the 49ers, he carried five times before injuring his ankle in the first quarter, an injury that ultimately caused him to miss the remainder of the season. He was encouraged to retire but decided to give football one last try. Sayers' final game was in the 1972 preseason in which he fumbled twice in three carries; he retired from professional football days later at age 29.

=== Career statistics ===
Year	Team	Games		Rushing					Receiving					Passing					Returning						Total TD
Year	Team	GP	GS	Att	Yds	Avg	Lng	TD	Rec	Yds	Avg	Lng	TD	Cmp	Att	Yds	TD	Int	KR	KR Yds	KR TD	PR	PR Yds	PR TD	Total TD
1965	CHI	14	12	166	867	5.2	61	14	29	507	17.5	80	6	2	3	53	1	1	21	660	1	16	238	1	23
1966	CHI	14	13	229	1,231	5.4	58	8	34	447	13.1	80	2	2	6	58	0	1	23	718	2	6	44	0	12
1967	CHI	13	13	186	880	4.7	70	7	16	126	7.9	32	1	0	5	0	0	0	16	603	3	3	80	1	12
1968	CHI	9	9	138	856	6.2	63	2	15	117	7.8	21	0	0	2	0	0	0	17	461	0	2	29	0	2
1969	CHI	14	14	236	1,032	4.4	28	8	17	116	6.8	25	0	0	2	0	0	0	14	339	0	0	0	0	8
1970	CHI	2	2	23	52	2.3	15	0	1	-6	-6.0	-6	0	0	0	0	0	0	0	0	0	0	0	0	0
1971	CHI	2	2	13	38	2.9	9	0	0	0	0.0	0	0	0	0	0	0	0	0	0	0	0	0	0	0
Career		68	65	991	4,956	5.0	70	39	112	1,307	11.7	80	9	4	18	111	1	2	91	2,781	6	27	391	2	57

== Playing style ==
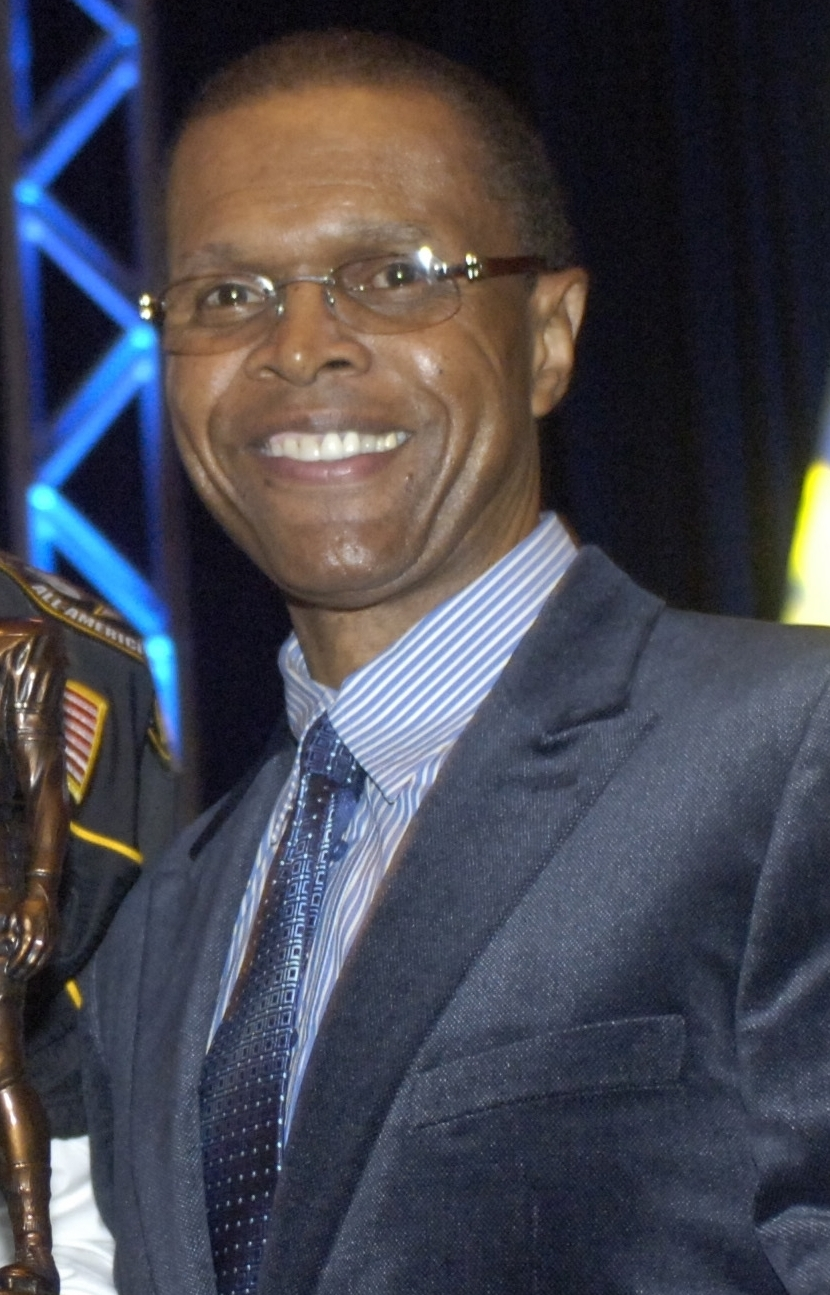
Sayers in 2008

Sayers' ability as a runner in the open field was considered unmatched, both during his playing career and since his retirement. He possessed raw speed and was also highly elusive and had terrific vision, a combination which made him very difficult to tackle. Actor Billy Dee Williams, who portrayed Sayers in the 1971 film Brian's Song, likened his running to "ballet" and "poetry". Mike Ditka, a teammate of Sayers' for two seasons, called him "the greatest player I've ever seen. That's right—the greatest." Another former teammate, linebacker Dick Butkus, famous for his tackling ability, said of Sayers:

He had this ability to go full speed, cut and then go full speed again right away. I saw it every day in practice. We played live, and you could never get a clean shot on Gale. Never.

On his tendency to escape from tight situations, Sayers once proclaimed, "Just give me 18 inches of daylight. That's all I need." He felt if his blockers created 18 inches of space for him to run through, he could break a run into the open field. This quick acceleration became a hallmark of his running style, although some of it was lost following the injury to his right knee. After the injury, he relied more on tough running and engaging tacklers for extra yards.

Despite the production from Sayers, the Bears as a whole struggled to find success; in games that Sayers played, the team compiled a record of 29 wins, 36 losses, and 3 ties, and failed to reach the postseason. Because of this, Sayers' main focus each postseason was on the Pro Bowl, where he excelled. Showcasing his breakaway talents, throughout his Pro Bowl career he achieved runs of 74, 52, 51, 48, and 42 yards. In the Pro Bowl following his rookie season, he had kickoff returns of 51 and 48 yards, despite limited opportunities due to the East's attempts to punt and kick away from him. In the next season's game, his 10 yards-per-carry average set a Pro Bowl record. He was named the "Back of the Game", an honor he received again in 1968 and 1969, joining Johnny Unitas as the only players to win three Pro Bowl MVP awards. "The Pro Bowl is the time to prove how good you are, playing against the best of your peers," recalled Sayers. "I took it as a challenge. I came into the game in shape, came to play."

== Brian Piccolo ==
In 1967, Sayers and Bears teammate Brian Piccolo became roommates in the NFL. Sayers' ensuing friendship with Piccolo and Piccolo's struggle with cancer (embryonal cell carcinoma, which was diagnosed after it metastasized to a large tumor in his chest cavity) became the subject of the made-for-TV movie Brian's Song. The movie, in which Sayers was portrayed by Billy Dee Williams in the 1971 original and by Mekhi Phifer in the 2001 remake, was adapted from Sayers' account of this story in his 1970 autobiography, I Am Third. Sayers and Piccolo were devoted friends and deeply respectful of and affectionate with each other. Piccolo helped Sayers through rehabilitation after injury, and Sayers was by Piccolo's side throughout his illness until his death in June 1970.

== Later life ==
=== Sports administration and business career ===
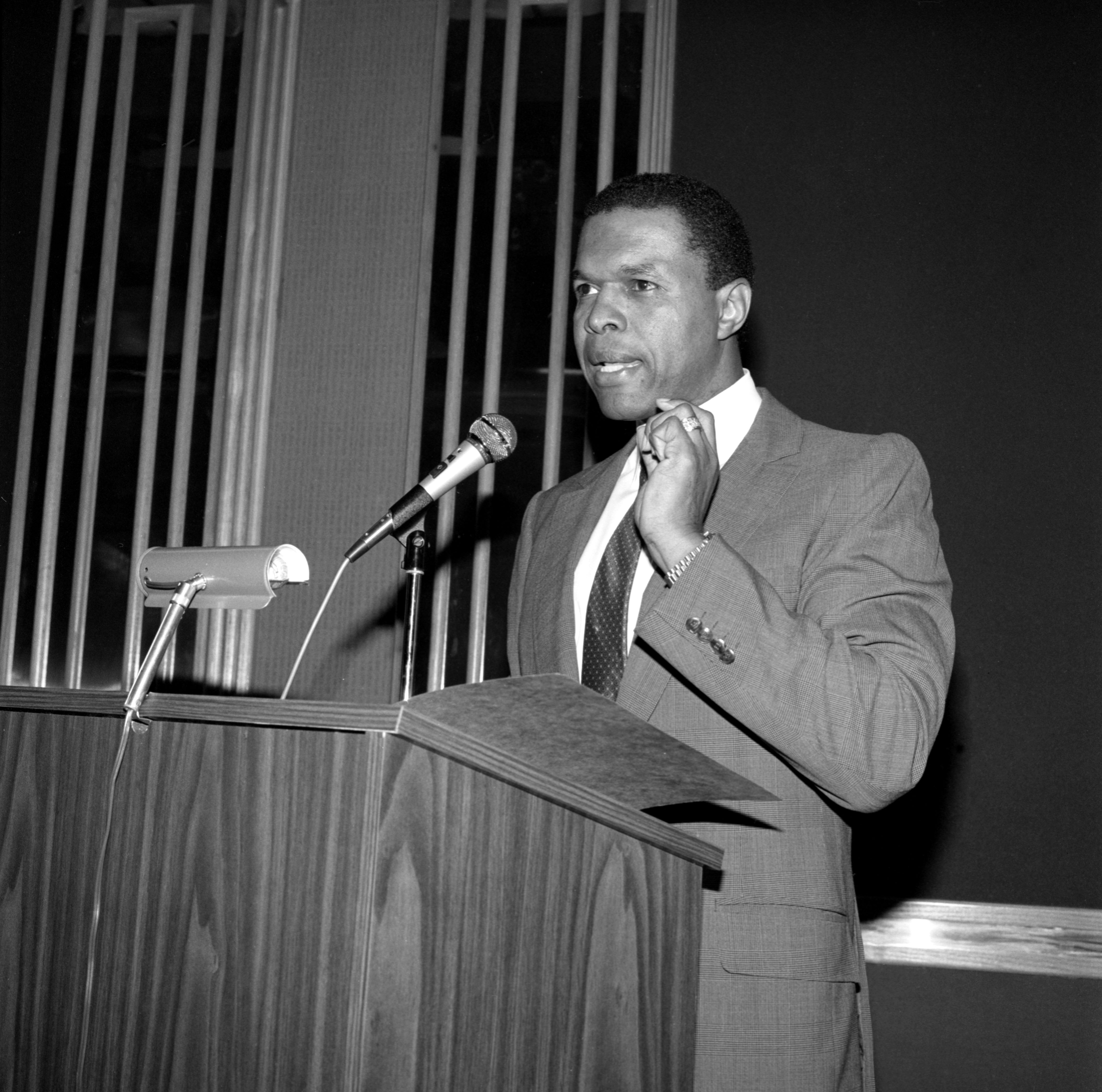
Sayers giving a speech at the 1986 Contract Management Meeting

Sayers worked in the athletic department at his alma mater, the University of Kansas, for three and half years, before he was named the athletic director at Southern Illinois University Carbondale in 1976. He resigned from his position at Southern Illinois in 1981. From 1985 to 1986, Sayers worked as the athletic director at Tennessee State University in Nashville, TN.

In 1983, Sayers acquired an interest in Chezik-Sayers Honda, a new Honda dealership located in Iowa City, Iowa. Ironically, Iowa City—home of the University of Iowa—was nearly the site of Gale Sayers' college football career. By 2004, the dealership had grown to become one of the largest in the state, expanding to include franchises for Mercedes, Ford, Lincoln, Mercury, Volvo, Suzuki, and Mitsubishi. These operated under the names Chezik-Sayers Honda and Chezik-Bell Imports, reflecting the partnership between John Chezik of Kansas City, Jon Bell of Iowa City, and Sayers.

In 1984, Sayers founded Crest Computer Supply Company in the Chicago area. Under Sayers' leadership, this company experienced consistent growth and was renamed Sayers 40, Inc. He was chairman of Sayers 40, Inc., the aforementioned technology consulting and implementation firm serving Fortune 1000 companies nationally with offices in Vernon Hills, Illinois, Walpole, Massachusetts, Clearwater, Florida, and Atlanta. Sayers, along with his wife Ardythe, were also active philanthropists in Chicago. He supported the Cradle Foundation—an adoption organization in Evanston, Illinois, and founded the Gale Sayers Center in the Austin neighborhood of Chicago. The Gale Sayers Center is an after-school program for children ages 8–12 from Chicago's west side and focuses on leadership development, tutoring, and mentoring. In 2009, Sayers joined the University of Kansas Athletic Department staff as Director of Fundraising for Special Projects.

=== Concussion lawsuits ===
In September 2013, Sayers reportedly sued the NFL, claiming the league negligently handled his repeated head injuries during his career. The lawsuit claimed Sayers suffered headaches and short-term memory loss since retirement. It stated he was sometimes sent back into games after suffering concussions, and that the league did not do enough to protect him. The case was withdrawn after Sayers initially claimed it was done so because the case was filed without his permission, but was actually withdrawn due to other litigation that Sayers was involved in at the time. Sayers filed a new lawsuit in January 2014 along with six other former players. The lawsuit was finally settled in late October, 2017. Sayers was represented by James Acho.

=== Legacy and honors ===
==== Records ====
Sayers' record of 22 touchdowns in a season was broken by O. J. Simpson in 1975, who scored 23; his 22 touchdowns remains a rookie record as of 2021. Sayers was the last player to score at least six touchdowns in a game until 2020, when Alvin Kamara scored six against the Minnesota Vikings. His career kickoff return average of 30.56 yards is an NFL record for players with at least 75 attempts, and he is one of several players to have scored two return touchdowns in a game. He is tied with four other players for the second most career kickoff return touchdowns, with six. Sayers' rookie record of 2,272 all-purpose yards was broken in 1988 by Tim Brown, who gained 2,317 yards through 16 games, which was two more games than Sayers set the record in. His single-season all-purpose yards record of 2,440 set in 1966 was broken in 1974 by Mack Herron, who surpassed it by four yards.

==== Post-career recognition ====
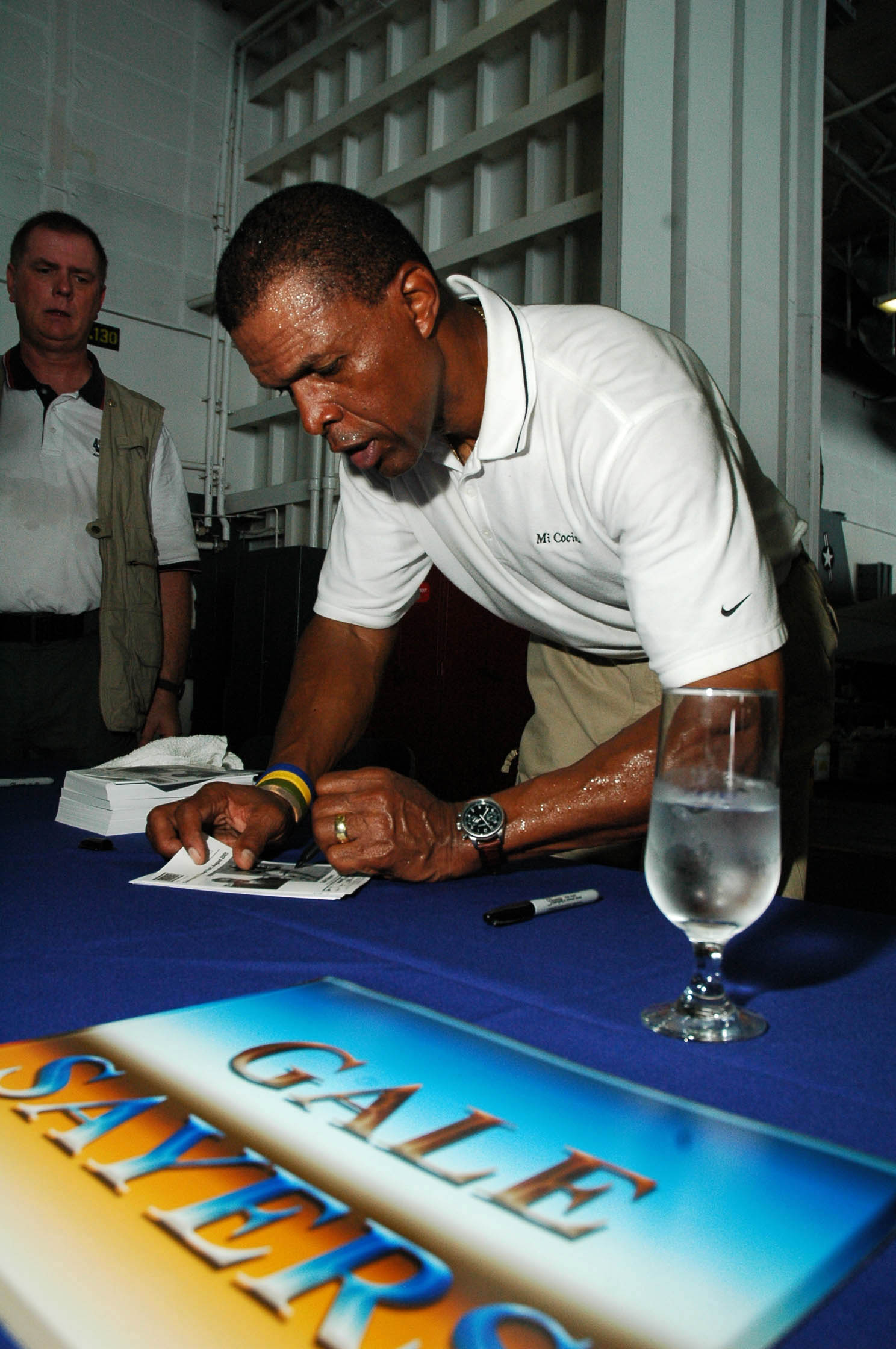
Sayers signing autographs in 2005

Sayers was elected to the Lincoln Journal's Nebraska Sports Hall of Fame in 1973, the first black athlete to be so honored. He was inducted into the College Football Hall of Fame in 1977. His number 48 jersey is one of three retired by the Kansas Jayhawks football team.

Later in 1977, Sayers was inducted into the Pro Football Hall of Fame and is still the youngest inductee in its history. On October 31, 1994, at halftime of a Monday night game, the Bears retired his number 40 at Soldier Field, along with number 51, which had been worn by teammate, linebacker Dick Butkus. The Pro Football Hall of Fame selection committee named Sayers to its NFL 1960s All-Decade Team, which is composed of the best players of the 1960s at each position. In 1969, Sayers was selected to the NFL 50th Anniversary All-Time Team. In 1994, Sayers was selected for the NFL 75th Anniversary All-Time Team as both a halfback and a kickoff returner; he was the only player selected for multiple positions. In 2019, he was one of twelve running backs selected to the NFL 100th Anniversary All-Time Team. In 1999, he was ranked 22nd on The Sporting News's list of the 100 Greatest Football Players.

=== Illness and death ===
In March 2017, Sayers' wife Ardythe revealed that he had been diagnosed with dementia four years prior. She stated that a Mayo Clinic doctor confirmed it was likely caused by his football career. "It wasn't so much getting hit in the head," she said. "It's just the shaking of the brain when they took him down with the force they play the game in." While he remained physically healthy, the disease had an adverse effect on his mental health and memory in particular, making simple tasks such as signing his own name difficult. After suffering from dementia for several years, Sayers died on September 23, 2020, at the age of 77. He was interred at Forest Lawn Memorial Park in Omaha, Nebraska.

== Notes and references ==
=== Bibliography ===
- Chicago Tribune staff (2015). The Chicago Tribune Book of the Chicago Bears: A Decade-By-Decade History. Agate Publishing. ISBN 978-1572847583.
- Layden, Tim (August 23, 2010). "Part Iii: The Icon". Sports Illustrated. Vol. 113, no. 6. Archived from the original on August 25, 2010.
- Sayers, Gale; Mitchell, Fred (2007). Sayers: My Life and Times. Triumph Books. ISBN 978-1572439955.
