= Willie Holman =

American football player (1945–2002)

No. 85
- Positions: Defensive end, Defensive tackle

Personal information
- Born: February 27, 1945; St. Matthews, South Carolina, U.S.
- Died: April 21, 2002 (aged 57); Chicago, Illinois, U.S.
- Listed height: 6 ft 4 in (1.93 m)
- Listed weight: 250 lb (113 kg)

Career information
- High school: St. Matthews
- College: South Carolina State
- NFL draft: 1968: 7th round, 181st overall pick

Career history
- Chicago Bears (1968–1973); Washington Redskins (1973)

Career NFL statistics
- Fumble recoveries: 5
- Sacks: 26
- Stats at Pro Football Reference

Willie Joseph Holman (February 27, 1945 – April 21, 2002) was an American football defensive end in the National Football League (NFL) for the Chicago Bears and the Washington Redskins. He played college football at South Carolina State University and was drafted in the seventh round of the 1968 NFL/AFL draft.
