= Dave Hale =

American football player (born 1947)

No. 75
- Position: Defensive tackle

Personal information
- Born: June 21, 1947 (age 79); McCook, Nebraska, U.S.
- Listed height: 6 ft 8 in (2.03 m)
- Listed weight: 225 lb (102 kg)

Career information
- High school: Benson (Omaha, Nebraska)
- College: Ottawa
- NFL draft: 1969: 12th round, 300th overall pick

Career history
- Chicago Bears (1969–1973)
- Stats at Pro Football Reference

David Robert Hale (born June 21, 1947) is an American former professional football player who was a defensive tackle for the Chicago Bears of the National Football League (NFL). He played college football for the Ottawa Braves.
