= Cecil Turner =

American football player (born 1944)

No. 21
- Positions: Wide receiver, return specialist

Personal information
- Born: April 2, 1944 (age 82); Washington, D.C., U.S.
- Listed height: 5 ft 10 in (1.78 m)
- Listed weight: 176 lb (80 kg)

Career information
- High school: Spingarn (Washington, D.C.)
- College: Pratt (1964–1965); Cal Poly (1966–1967)
- NFL draft: 1968: 5th round, 127th overall pick

Career history
- Chicago Bears (1968–1973)

Awards and highlights
- Pro Bowl (1970); NFL record: Most kickoff return touchdowns in a season: 4 (1970)

Career NFL statistics
- Receptions: 21
- Receiving yards: 364
- Receiving touchdowns: 2
- Return yards: 2,730
- Return touchdowns: 4
- Stats at Pro Football Reference

Cecil Turner (born April 2, 1944) is an American former professional football player who was a wide receiver for six seasons for the Chicago Bears of the National Football League (NFL).

He was selected to the 1971 Pro Bowl, when he tied a record (set in 1967 by Travis Williams) by returning four kickoffs for touchdowns, a record that still stands.

He was twice the NCAA College Division long jump champion while attending Cal-Poly San Luis Obispo, and one-time 100-meter champion.

== Early life ==
Turner was born on April 2, 1944, in Washington, D.C. He graduated from Spingarn High School in Washington D.C. He was a member of Spingarn's track team, where he was a sprinter (100- and 200-yard dashes and half-mile relay), and participated in the high jump and broad jump.

== College career ==
=== Track and field ===
Turner started his college career as a track and field standout. Competing for Pratt College (then known as Pratt Junior College), he won the 1964 NJCAA 100-yard dash title, with a time of 9.5 seconds at the meet hosted in Big Spring, Texas. He continued to excel in track after transferring to Cal Poly San Luis Obispo, bettering his time to 9.3 seconds in the 100-yard dash, and ultimately leading the Mustangs to the 1968 NCAA College Division outdoor track and field team national title.

In February 1967, as a junior, he won the 60-yard dash at the Golden Gate Invitational Track Meet (6.1 seconds). At the 1967 NCAA College Division championship track and field meet, Turner won the long jump (24 ft 5 in, 7.44 m) individually, and anchored Cal Poly's championship 440-yard relay team. He was third in the 100-yard dash (9.4 seconds), and fourth in the 220-yard dash (21.3 seconds).

In 1968, Turner was captain of Cal Poly's track team as a senior. During his final amateur track meet in June 1968, at the NCAA College Division track and field championship, Turner was selected as the most valuable athlete and led Cal Poly to the national championship. He won the 100-meter race (10.3 seconds) and the long jump (24 ft 3.5 in, 7.4 m) individually, and was second in the 200-meter race. He also ran the first leg for Cal Poly's championship 440-relay team.

=== Football ===
Turner played football for two years at Cal Poly at split end and as a kick returner, under coach Sheldon Harden. His best season came as a junior in 1966. Turner had 16 receptions for 366 yards (a 22.9-yard average) and two touchdowns. His receptions included, among others, catches of 67 and 72 yards. In late October 1966, he returned a kickoff 87 yards for a touchdown against San Fernando Valley State College. In an early November 1966 game against Cal State Los Angeles, Turner saved the game for Cal Poly when he chased down Cal State's kickoff returner by tackling him at the Cal Poly eight-yard line after an 80-yard return; knocking two Cal State players aside to make the game-saving tackle.

In 1967, midway through his senior football season for Cal Poly, Turner was hailed as "the fastest college football player in the nation," as he accumulated four touchdowns through the first four games of the year. He missed a number of games, however, because of a knee injury. He also missed most of a mid-September loss to San Francisco State (SFS) when he was ejected in the first quarter, in a game where Cal Poly was called for 13 penalties for 116 yards, and SFS was called for one penalty for five yards. He was able to return for the final game of the season against the University of California, Santa Barbara in late November 1967, in which he made a spectacular 34-yard reception for a touchdown. On the season, he had 11 receptions for 269 yards (24.5 yards per catch) and six touchdowns.

Despite missing games in 1967, United Press International (UPI) still made him an honorable mention Little All-Coast Football Team. Turner was selected to participate in the Shrine-sponsored North-South California collegiate all-star game, known as the Potato Bowl. He was later elected to the Cal Poly Hall of Fame in 1989.

== Professional career ==
Turner was selected 127th overall in the fifth round of the 1968 NFL/AFL draft by the Chicago Bears. He could have chosen to remain an amateur and tried out for the 1968 U.S. Olympic team, but chose to play professional football instead, calling it a tough decision at the time.

As a rookie in 1968, Turner returned punts and kickoffs for the Bears; and was a full-time starting receiver for the only time in his career. From 1969 through his final season in 1973, he only had seven total pass receptions. In the fifth game of the season, he had an 80-yard touchdown reception against the Detroit Lions. On the season, he returned nine punts and 20 kickoffs, and had 14 receptions for 408 yards (14.9 yards per catch) and two touchdowns. In 1969, sharing kickoff return duties with future Hall of Fame running back Gale Sayers, among others, he had 10 returns for 326 yards, to go along with eight punt returns. He only had one reception on the year, and played in only nine games.

Tuner's breakout, and best, season as a kickoff returner came in 1970. He returned 23 kickoffs for 752 yards, averaging 32.7 yards per return (second highest in the NFL to Jim Duncan's 35.4 average). He led the NFL with four touchdown returns on kickoffs, and was selected to play in the Pro Bowl. In the first game of the 1970 season, he returned a kickoff 95 yards for a touchdown against the New York Giants in the first quarter. The next week, on September 27, Turner returned the opening kickoff 96 yards for a touchdown against the Philadelphia Eagles. On November 1, he had a 94-yard kickoff return against the Atlanta Falcons for a touchdown. On December 5, he had an 88-yard touchdown return against the Minnesota Vikings. He was second on the Bears in total kickoff returns, to Ron Smith's 28.

In 1971, Turner returned nine punts for 63 yards, and a career-high 31 kickoffs, for 639 yards; but his longest kickoff return was for 40 yards. In 1972, he returned 16 kickoffs for 409 yards, with his longest 57 yards. In his final season, 1973, Turner had only eight kickoff returns for 127 yards.

In August 1974, he was traded to the San Francisco 49ers for Dick Witcher and John Isenbarger. The 49ers waived Turner before the start of the 1974 season. He then signed with the Florida Blazers of the World Football League. The Blazers played in the first WFL championship game, but the team was on the verge of bankruptcy and failed to pay its players regularly during the year, folding after its first season.

== Legacy ==
Turner's four kickoff touchdown returns is tied for the NFL's all-time record in a season. Larry Mayer ranked Turner as the seventh-greatest return specialist in Bears history on the team's official website, noting his 32.7-yard average for the 1970 season as second only to Gale Sayers' 37.7 yards per return in 1967. In 2010, Bleacher Report selected Turner as an honorable mention in the kickoff return position to their all-time Bears team, with the spot going to Gale Sayers.
