= Joe Taylor (cornerback) =

American football player (1939–2001)

No. 84, 24, 20
- Position: Cornerback

Personal information
- Born: August 27, 1939; Miami, Florida, U.S.
- Died: June 15, 2001 (aged 61)
- Listed height: 6 ft 1 in (1.85 m)
- Listed weight: 200 lb (91 kg)

Career information
- College: North Carolina A&T (1958-1961)
- NFL draft: 1962: 15th round, 209th overall pick

Career history
- Quebec / Toronto Rifles (1964-1966); Chicago Bears (1967–1974)

Career NFL statistics
- Interceptions: 15
- Fumble recoveries: 5
- Stats at Pro Football Reference

Joseph Lee Taylor (August 27, 1939 – June 15, 2001) was an American professional football cornerback who played his entire eight-year National Football League (NFL) career with the Chicago Bears. He was selected in the 15th round of the 1962 NFL draft with the 209th overall pick by the New York Giants.
