= Garry Lyle =

American football player (born 1945)

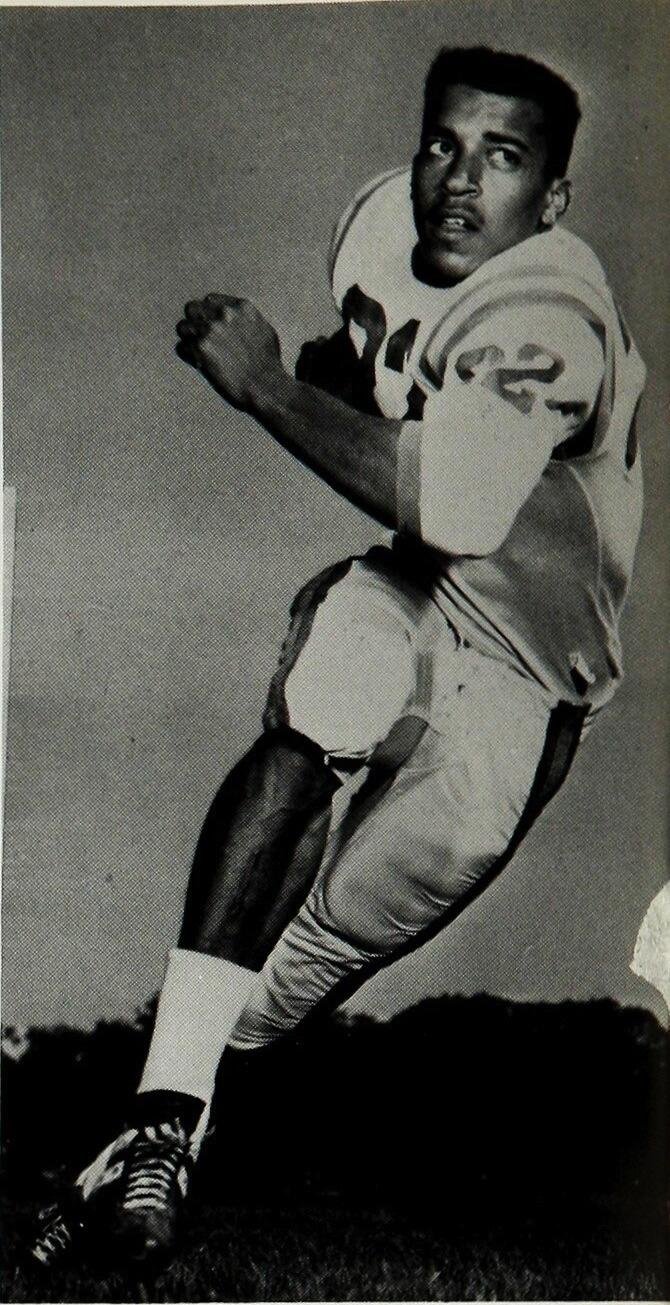
- Lyle as a sophomore at George Washington

No. 44
- Positions: Safety, Running back

Personal information
- Born: October 20, 1945 (age 81); New Martinsville, West Virginia, U.S.
- Listed height: 6 ft 2 in (1.88 m)
- Listed weight: 198 lb (90 kg)

Career information
- High school: Verona (Verona, Pennsylvania)
- College: George Washington
- NFL draft: 1967: 3rd round, 63rd overall pick

Career history
- Chicago Bears (1967–1974)

Career NFL statistics
- Interceptions: 12
- Interception yards: 210
- Fumble recoveries: 4
- Stats at Pro Football Reference

Garry Thomas Lyle (born October 20, 1945) is an American former professional football player who was a safety in the National Football League (NFL). He was selected by the Chicago Bears in the third round of the 1967 NFL/AFL draft and played for seven years.

He played varsity college football for the George Washington Colonials from 1964 to 1966, starting as tailback but quickly switching to quarterback, one of the first African Americans to play quarterback at a predominantly white institution. After injury, he continued as placekicker. He was the first African American to make All Conference. He was GW's last NFL draftee. Lyle's son, Keith, also played in the National Football League from 1994 to 2002.
