= Randy Jackson (offensive lineman) =

American football player (born 1944)

No. 65
- Position: Offensive tackle

Personal information
- Born: March 6, 1944 (age 82); Lake City, Florida, U.S.
- Listed height: 6 ft 5 in (1.96 m)
- Listed weight: 250 lb (113 kg)

Career information
- High school: Columbia (Lake City)
- College: Florida (1964–1965)
- NFL draft: 1966: 4th round, 51st overall pick
- AFL draft: 1966: 3rd round, 25th overall pick

Career history
- Chicago Bears (1967–1974)

Awards and highlights
- University of Florida Athletic Hall of Fame

Career NFL statistics
- Games played: 105
- Games started: 97
- Fumble recoveries: 4
- Stats at Pro Football Reference

Randall Belford Jackson (born March 6, 1944) is an American former professional football player who was an offensive lineman for eight seasons in the National Football League (NFL) during the 1960s and 1970s. Jackson played college football for the Florida Gators, and thereafter, he played professionally for the Chicago Bears of the NFL.

== Early life ==
Randy Jackson was born in Lake City, Florida in 1944, and he attended Lake City High School.

== College career ==
Jackson received an athletic scholarship to attend the University of Florida in Gainesville, Florida, where he was a tackle for coach Ray Graves' Gators from 1963 to 1965. As a senior in 1965, he was a member of the first Gators squad to ever receive an invitation from a "major" bowl, the 1966 Sugar Bowl. Jackson graduated from Florida with a bachelor's degree in business administration in 1968, and was later inducted into the University of Florida Athletic Hall of Fame as a "Gator Great."

== Professional career ==
The Chicago Bears selected Jackson in the fourth round (fifty-first pick overall) of the 1966 NFL draft, and he played in 105 games at offensive tackle for the Bears from 1967 to 1974.

== See also ==
- Florida Gators football, 1960–69
- List of Chicago Bears players
- List of Florida Gators in the NFL draft
- List of University of Florida alumni
- List of University of Florida Athletic Hall of Fame members
