= 1967 NFL playoffs =

American football tournament

- Dates: December 23–31, 1967
- Season: 1967
- Teams: 4
- Games played: 3
- NFL Championship Game site: Lambeau Field; Green Bay, Wisconsin
- Defending champions: Green Bay Packers
- Champion: Green Bay Packers (11th title)
- Runner-up: Dallas Cowboys
NFL playoffs
← 1965 ←1966 Champ. Game	1968 →

The NFL playoffs following the 1967 NFL season culminated in the NFL championship game on New Year's Eve, and determined who would represent the league against the American Football League champions in Super Bowl II.

With 16 teams in the league in 1967, this was the first season that the NFL used a four-team playoff tournament. The four division winners advanced to the postseason, with the two division winners in each conference meeting in the first round (effectively being conference championship games). The championship game this year was the famous Ice Bowl, played in Green Bay on December 31.

Although the Baltimore Colts (11–1–2) had tied for the best record in the league, they lost the new division tie-breaker (point differential in head-to-head games) to the Los Angeles Rams and were excluded from the postseason. The teams had tied in mid-October in Baltimore and the Colts entered the last game undefeated, but lost 34–10 to the Rams in Los Angeles on December 17. In previous seasons, unscheduled tiebreaker games were played (with head-to-head results disregarded); the last was just two years earlier. Prior to 1967, the teams with the best record in the eastern and western divisions, went to the NFL Championship game.

== Regular season ==
=== Final standings ===
Eastern Conference

NFL Capitol
	W	L	T	PCT	DIV	CONF	PF	PA	STK
Dallas Cowboys	9	5	0	.643	4–2	8–2	342	268	L1
Philadelphia Eagles	6	7	1	.462	3–2–1	5–4–1	351	409	W1
Washington Redskins	5	6	3	.455	2–3–1	4–5–1	347	353	L1
New Orleans Saints	3	11	0	.214	2–4	2–8	233	379	W1

NFL Century
	W	L	T	PCT	DIV	CONF	PF	PA	STK
Cleveland Browns	9	5	0	.643	5–1	7–3	334	297	L1
New York Giants	7	7	0	.500	5–1	7–3	369	379	W1
St. Louis Cardinals	6	7	1	.462	1–4–1	4–5–1	333	356	L2
Pittsburgh Steelers	4	9	1	.308	0–5–1	1–8–1	281	320	W1

Note: Tie games were not officially counted in the standings until 1972.

Western Conference

NFL Coastal
	W	L	T	PCT	DIV	CONF	PF	PA	STK
Los Angeles Rams	11	1	2	.917	4–1–1	8–1–1	398	196	W8
Baltimore Colts	11	1	2	.917	4–1–1	7–1–2	394	198	L1
San Francisco 49ers	7	7	0	.500	3–3	4–6	273	337	W2
Atlanta Falcons	1	12	1	.077	0–6	1–9	175	422	L7

NFL Central
	W	L	T	PCT	DIV	CONF	PF	PA	STK
Green Bay Packers	9	4	1	.692	4–1–1	6–3–1	332	209	L2
Chicago Bears	7	6	1	.538	3–2–1	5–4–1	239	218	W1
Detroit Lions	5	7	2	.417	1–3–2	3–5–2	260	259	W2
Minnesota Vikings	3	8	3	.273	1–3–2	1–6–3	233	294	L1

== Postseason ==
=== Bracket ===
Within each conference, the two division winners qualified for the playoffs. In the first round, the Capitol Division winner met the Century Division winner in the Eastern Conference game, while the Coastal Division winner faced the Central Division winner in the Western Conference game. The conference champions advanced to the NFL Championship Game, whose winner played the American Football League champion in Super Bowl II at the Orange Bowl in Miami on January 14. The losers of the conference championship games met in the third place Playoff Bowl, also in Miami, on January 7.

Prior to 1975, the playoff sites rotated and were known prior to the start of the season. In 1967, the hosts were the Capitol and Central division winners for the conference championships (first round), and the Western Conference for the championship game, effectively giving home field advantage to the Central Division winner, the two-time defending NFL champion Green Bay Packers, who clinched their division title with three games remaining. The 1968 playoff hosts were Century, Coastal, and Eastern, respectively, and 1969 was like 1967.

The rotation system forced the Rams (11–1–2) to play at the Packers (9–4–1) in the Western Conference playoff. It had no effect in the Eastern Conference; Cleveland and Dallas were both 9–5, and the Cowboys defeated the Browns during the regular season. With the rotation system it was common for the host team to have an inferior record; it had occurred in four of the previous five NFL championship games (1962, 1964, 1965, 1966), with the home teams winning twice (1964, 1965).

Conference championships
December 24 – Cotton Bowl
Cleveland	14
Dallas	52
December 23 – Milwaukee County Stadium
Los Angeles	7
Green Bay	28

NFL Championship
December 31 – Lambeau Field
Dallas	17
Green Bay	21
Playoff Bowl
January 7, 1968 – Orange Bowl
Cleveland	6
Los Angeles	30

=== Conference championships ===
==== Saturday, December 23, 1967 ====
===== Western Conference: Green Bay Packers 28, Los Angeles Rams 7 =====
Green Bay Packers 28, Los Angeles Rams 7

Quarter	1	2	3	4	Total
Rams	7	0	0	0	7
Packers	0	14	7	7	28

at Milwaukee County Stadium, Milwaukee, Wisconsin

- Date: December 23
- Game time: 1:05 p.m. CST
- Game weather: 20 °F (−7 °C)
- Game attendance: 49,861
- Referee: Art McNally
- TV: CBS
- Pro-Football-Reference

Game information

Scoring

- First quarter
  - LA – Bernie Casey 29-yard pass from Roman Gabriel (Bruce Gossett kick). Rams 7–0
- Second quarter
  - GB – Travis Williams 46-yard run (Don Chandler kick). Tied 7–7
  - GB – Carroll Dale 17-yard pass from Bart Starr (Chandler kick). Packers 14–7
- Third quarter
  - GB – Chuck Mercein 6-yard run (Chandler kick). Packers 21–7
- Fourth quarter
  - GB – Travis Williams 3-yard run (Chandler kick). Packers 28–7

Top passers

- LA – Roman Gabriel – 11/31, 186 yards, 1 TD, 1 INT
- GB – Bart Starr – 17/23, 222 yards, 1 TD, 1 INT

Top rushers

- LA – Dick Bass – 14 rushes, 40 yards
- GB – Travis Williams – 18 rushes, 88 yards, 2 TD

Top receivers

- LA – Bernie Casey – 5 receptions, 82 yards, 1 TD
- GB – Carroll Dale – 6 receptions, 109 yards, 1 TD

The Rams came into the Western Conference Championship with all the momentum, possessing the NFL's best record, but having barely beaten the Packers two weeks earlier by a score of 27–24. In that game in Los Angeles, the Rams blew a 4th quarter lead, and needed a last-second touchdown set up by a blocked punt to pull out the game and keep their division title hopes alive, while the Packers had already clinched their division (and had home field in the playoffs) and were playing only for pride. In this postseason game, Green Bay would be playing for more than pride, as they were attempting win a third consecutive NFL title, unprecedented in the playoff era. The weather was expected to be cold and snowy; the snow held off but the temperature was 20 °F (−7 °C). However, the field condition was poor, and the Rams had accused the Packers of over watering the field to slow down the devastating pass rush of the Rams' Fearsome Foursome, who sacked Starr six times in the game in L.A. For three weeks prior, the field at County Stadium was covered by a tarpaulin and thirty tons of hay.

By the end of the game, LA forced four turnovers, three fumble recoveries and an interception. But they were only able to convert one of them into a score, a first quarter fumble by Carroll Dale that was recovered by defensive back Chuck Lamson on the Rams' 46-yard line. This set up Roman Gabriel's 29-yard touchdown pass to Bernie Casey, giving the Rams a 7–0 lead. But this was all the Rams could do in the first half, as Green Bay's defense took over. Three times, they would drive into Green Bay territory, and each time they would fail to score. Lamson's interception of a Bart Starr pass resulted in nothing when Dave Robinson blocked Bruce Gossett's 24-yard field goal attempt. The Rams also lost the ball twice in Packers territory as a result of failed 4th down conversion attempts.

In the second quarter, Green Bay's Tom Brown returned a punt 39 yards to the Rams 46-yard line. On the next play, rookie Travis Williams raced 46 yards for Green Bay's first touchdown. Later on, Gossett's 46-yard field goal attempt fell short of the goal posts, and Willie Wood returned the ball 44 yards to the Packers' 45. The Packers then drove 55 yards in 10 plays to score on Starr's 18-yard touchdown pass to Dale, giving the team a 14–7 lead going into halftime.

Led by Jerry Kramer and Forrest Gregg, the Packers' offensive line neutralized the vaunted "Fearsome Foursome" of Los Angeles. Where they had thoroughly harassed Starr in the Rams' victory two weeks before, Starr was sacked only once in the playoff contest. The Packers defensive line took Gabriel down five times and pressured him into throwing inaccurate passes all day (3-and-a-half of the 5 sacks were by Henry Jordan). Early in the third quarter, LA recovered another Green Bay fumble, giving them a first down on the Packers' 26-yard line. But this drive ended with no points when Gossett missed another field goal try, this one a 37-yard attempt. The Packers then drove 80 yards to go up 21–7 on Chuck Mercein's 6-yard touchdown run. In the 4th quarter, Starr's 48-yard completion to Dale set up the final score on a 3-yard touchdown run by Williams. This was the only NFL playoff game ever held at Milwaukee County Stadium.

Starr completed 17 of 23 passes for 222 yards and a touchdown, with 1 interception, while also rushing for 8 yards. Dale caught 6 passes for 109 yards and a score. Williams rushed for 88 yards and two touchdowns, while also catching an 8-yard pass. Gabriel completed just 11 of 31 passes for 186 yards and a touchdown, with 1 interception. Casey caught 5 passes for 81 yards and a touchdown. Lamson had two fumble recoveries and an interception.

==== Sunday, December 24, 1967 ====
===== Eastern Conference: Dallas Cowboys 52, Cleveland Browns 14 =====
Dallas Cowboys 52, Cleveland Browns 14

Quarter	1	2	3	4	Total
Browns	0	7	0	7	14
Cowboys	14	10	21	7	52

at Cotton Bowl, Dallas, Texas

- Date: December 24
- Game time: 1:35 p.m. CST
- Game weather: 59 °F (15 °C)
- Game attendance: 70,786
- Referee: Tommy Bell
- TV: CBS
- Pro-Football-Reference

Game information
Scoring
- First quarter
  - DAL – Craig Baynham 3 pass from Don Meredith (Danny Villanueva kick), DAL 7–0
  - DAL – Don Perkins 4 run (Villanueva kick), DAL 14–0
- Second quarter
  - DAL – Bob Hayes 86 pass from Meredith (Villanueva kick), DAL 21–0
  - DAL – field goal Villanueva 10, DAL 24–0
  - CLE – Milt Morin 13 pass from Frank Ryan (Lou Groza kick), DAL 24–7
- Third quarter
  - DAL – Baynham 1 run (Villanueva kick), DAL 31–7
  - DAL – Perkins 1 run (Villanueva kick), DAL 38–7
  - DAL – Cornell Green 60 interception return (Villanueva kick), DAL 45–7
- Fourth quarter
  - DAL – Baynham 1 run (Villanueva kick), DAL 52–7
  - CLE – Paul Warfield 75 pass from Ryan (Groza kick), DAL 52–14

Like the Dallas Cowboys, the wildly inconsistent Cleveland Browns underachieved themselves to a 9–5 record. The Browns featured one of the best running games in the league with Leroy Kelly, while the Cowboys had one of the best run defenses in the game. "Dandy" Don Meredith, the Cowboys quarterback, had been hampered by injuries all year, but Meredith was fully recovered for the contest with the Browns, completing 10 of his 12 pass attempts for 212 yards and 2 touchdowns.

Dallas scored on their opening drive, moving the ball 80 yards in 13 plays, including a 24-yard run by Don Perkins, to score on Meredith's 3-yard touchdown pass to running back Craig Baynham. Later in the first quarter, Cowboys receiver Bob Hayes returned a punt 64 yards before punter Gary Collins tackled him on the Browns' 13-yard line. Four plays later, Perkins crashed through the line for a 1-yard touchdown run on fourth down to give Dallas a 14–0 lead.

In the second quarter, Cleveland seemed ready to respond when Leroy Kelly took off for a 46-yard run to the Cowboys' 10-yard line. But after being forced into a 4th down situation, a bad snap spoiled Lou Groza's field goal attempt. Dallas took over on their own 10-yard line, and two plays later, Hayes raced past Browns cornerback Mike Howell, caught a pass from Meredith past midfield, and took it all the way to the end zone for an 86-yard touchdown reception. Following a punt, Dallas drove 52 yards in 9 plays to score on Danny Villanueva's 10-yard field goal, giving them a 24–0 lead. With time running out in the second quarter, Cleveland quarterback Frank Ryan put together a last second touchdown drive, completing a 15-yard pass to Kelly and two passes to tight end Milt Morin for gains of 10 and 12 yards (the 12-yard reception converted a 4th and 11 situation). With just 4 seconds left on the clock, Ryan cut the score to 24–7 with a 13-yard touchdown pass to Morin.

Still any hopes of a comeback were quickly dashed in the second half, as Meredith completed a 36-yard pass to Hayes on the Browns' 4-yard line that set up Baynham's 1-yard touchdown run, putting the Cowboys up 31–7. Cleveland responded with a drive to midfield, but this was stopped cold when Kelly was stuffed for no gain on 4th and 1. The Browns managed to prevent a score when linebacker Dale Lindsey recovered a fumble from Lance Rentzel on the Browns' 18-yard line, but their offense ended up punting again, and Hayes returned it 68 yards to the Cleveland 2. Three plays later, Perkins' 1-yard touchdown made the score 38–7. Then it became 45–7 when Cornell Green intercepted Ryan's pass and returned it 60 yards for a touchdown.

Meredith was replaced by Craig Morton for most of the fourth quarter, but Dallas still managed to put together another touchdown drive, moving the ball 57 yards to Baynham's 3rd touchdown of the game, this one on a 1-yard run. Meanwhile, all Cleveland could do was cut the final score to 52–14 when Ryan threw a 75-yard touchdown pass to Paul Warfield with 2:12 left in the game.

Hayes finished the game with five receptions for 144 yards and 3 punt returns for 141. His 141 punt return yards was an NFL playoff record until broken by Anthony Carter in the 1987 playoffs. His special teams effort would make a huge difference, as both teams were fairly even in yards gained (401 for Dallas, 322 for Cleveland) and turnovers (2 for Cleveland, 1 for Dallas) Perkins rushed for 74 yards and two touchdowns, while also catching a 4-yard pass. Ryan finished the game 14/30 for 194 yards, with two touchdowns and 1 interception. Kelly rushed for 96 yards and caught 4 passes for 39. Warfield caught 3 passes for 99 yards and a touchdown.

=== NFL Championship Game: Green Bay Packers 21, Dallas Cowboys 17 ===
Green Bay Packers 21, Dallas Cowboys 17

Quarter	1	2	3	4	Total
Cowboys	0	10	0	7	17
Packers	7	7	0	7	21

at Lambeau Field, Green Bay, Wisconsin

- Date: December 31
- Game time: 1:00 p.m. CST
- Game weather: −15 °F (−26 °C), Sunny
- Game attendance: 50,861
- Referee: Norm Schachter
- TV announcers (CBS): Ray Scott & Jack Buck, and Frank Gifford
- Pro Football Reference

Game information

First quarter

- GB – Boyd Dowler 8-yard pass from Bart Starr (Don Chandler kick). Packers 7–0

Second quarter

- GB – Boyd Dowler 46-yard pass from Starr (Chandler kick). Packers 14–0
- DAL – George Andrie 7-yard fumble return (Danny Villanueva kick). Packers 14–7
- DAL – Danny Villanueva 21-yard field goal. Packers 14–10

Fourth quarter

- DAL – Lance Rentzel 50-yard pass from Dan Reeves (Villanueva kick). Cowboys 17–14
- GB – Bart Starr 1-yard run (Chandler kick). Packers 21–17

Top passers

- DAL – Don Meredith – 10/25, 59 yards, INT
- GB – Bart Starr – 14/24, 191 yards, 2 TD

Top rushers

- DAL – Don Perkins – 13 carries, 42 yards
- GB – Donny Anderson – 18 carries, 35 yards

Top receivers

- DAL – Lance Rentzel – 2 receptions, 61 yards, TD
- GB – Boyd Dowler – 4 receptions, 77 yards, 2 TD
