= 1967 Green Bay Packers season =

49th franchise season; second Super Bowl win

- General manager: Vince Lombardi
- Head coach: Vince Lombardi
- Home stadium: Lambeau Field; Milwaukee County Stadium

Results
- Record: 9–4–1
- Division place: 1st NFL Central
- Playoffs: Won Western Conference Championship Game (vs. Rams) 28–7; Won NFL Championship (vs. Cowboys) 21–17; Won Super Bowl II (vs. Raiders) 33–14

The 1967 Green Bay Packers season was their 49th season overall and their 47th season in the National Football League (NFL) and resulted in a 9–4–1 record and a victory in Super Bowl II. The team beat the Dallas Cowboys in the NFL Championship Game, a game commonly known as the "Ice Bowl," which marked the second time the Packers had won an NFL-record third consecutive NFL championship, having also done so in 1931 under team founder Curly Lambeau. In the playoff era (since 1933), it remains the only time a team has won three consecutive NFL titles.

The Packers were led by ninth-year head coach Vince Lombardi and veteran quarterback Bart Starr, in his twelfth season. Green Bay's victory in Super Bowl II over the Oakland Raiders was the fifth world championship for the Packers under Lombardi and the last game he coached for the Packers.

The 1967 Packers became the first team in NFL history to win three consecutive championship games, and the second team in NFL history to three-peat as champions, after the 1929–1931 Packers. Through 2024, no team has won three championships in a row since.

On April 16, 2007, NFL Network aired America's Game: The Super Bowl Champions, the 1967 Green Bay Packers; it narrated by Tom Selleck with team commentary from Chuck Mercein, Dave Robinson, and Jerry Kramer.

== Offseason ==
=== Expansion draft ===
With the expansion New Orleans Saints entering the league in 1967, the Packers had to leave 11 players unprotected for the expansion draft. One of the players that Lombardi left unprotected was a future hall of famer, halfback Paul Hornung. Lombardi was distraught when the Saints selected Hornung in the draft. In later years, Hornung revealed that he spoke to Saints coach Tom Fears prior to the draft. Fears was a former assistant in Green Bay and Fears felt that Hornung would help sell tickets in New Orleans. Several weeks later, the Saints also signed Jim Taylor, the Packers fullback. Taylor, a Louisiana native and future hall of famer, had felt underpaid and underappreciated under Lombardi. While Taylor did see action for the Saints, Hornung never did play a single down for New Orleans due to a neck injury he sustained the previous year and retired during the team's inaugural training camp.

=== NFL draft ===
In the first round of the 1967 NFL/AFL draft in March, the Packers selected guard Bob Hyland and quarterback Don Horn.
This was the first common draft with the AFL, following the merger agreement of the previous June.

1967 Green Bay Packers draft
Round	Pick	Player	Position	College	Notes
1	9	Bob Hyland	Center	Boston College	
1	25	Don Horn	Quarterback	San Diego State	
2	41	Dave Dunaway	Wide receiver	Duke	
2	51	Jim Flanigan	Linebacker	Pittsburgh	
3	78	John Rowser	Cornerback	Michigan	
4	93	Travis Williams	Running back	Arizona State	
5	116	Dwight Hood	Defensive tackle	Baylor	
5	130	Richard Tate	Defensive back	Utah	
5	132	Jay Bachman	Center	Cincinnati	
6	158	Steward Williams	Running back	Bowling Green	
7	161	Bob Ziolkowski	Offensive tackle	Iowa	
7	184	Bill Powell	Linebacker	Missouri	
8	210	Clarence Miles	Defensive tackle	Trinity	
9	236	Harlan Reed	Tight end	Mississippi State	
10	262	Bill Shear	Kicker	Cortland State	
11	287	Dave Bennett	Quarterback	Springfield	
12	314	Mike Bass	Cornerback	Michigan	
13	340	Keith Brown	Wide receiver	Central Missouri	
14	366	Claudis James	Wide receiver	Jackson State	
15	392	Jim Schneider	Defensive tackle	Colgate	
16	418	Fred Cassidy	Running back	Miami (FL)	
17	444	Jeff Elias	Tight end	Kansas	
Made roster

=== Undrafted free agents ===
1967 undrafted free agents of note
Player	Position	College
Steve Buratto	Center	Idaho
Stan Kemp	Wide receiver	Michigan
Dick Werner	Defensive tackle	Bemidji State

== Roster ==
1967 Green Bay Packers roster
Quarterbacks: 12 Zeke Bratkowski; 13 Don Horn; 15 Bart Starr; Running backs: 44 Donny Anderson P; 33 Jim Grabowski; 30 Chuck Mercein; 23 Travis Williams; 36 Ben Wilson; Wide receivers: 84 Carroll Dale; 86 Boyd Dowler; 80 Bob Long; 85 Max McGee; Tight ends: 83 Allen Brown; 81 Marv Fleming	Offensive linemen: 57 Ken Bowman C; 68 Gale Gillingham G; 75 Forrest Gregg T; 50 Bob Hyland C; 64 Jerry Kramer G; 76 Bob Skoronski T; 63 Fuzzy Thurston G; 72 Steve Wright T; Defensive linemen: 82 Lionel Aldridge DE; 78 Bob Brown DE; 87 Willie Davis DE; 74 Henry Jordan DT; 77 Ron Kostelnik DT; 73 Jim Weatherwax DE/DT	Linebackers: 60 Lee Roy Caffey OLB; 56 Tommy Joe Crutcher OLB; 55 Jim Flanigan MLB; 66 Ray Nitschke MLB; 89 Dave Robinson OLB; Defensive backs: 26 Herb Adderley CB; 40 Tom Brown SS; 43 Doug Hart CB; 21 Bob Jeter CB; 45 John Rowser CB/S; 24 Willie Wood FS; Special teams: 34 Don Chandler K	Taxi squad: -- Jay Bachman C; 88 Dick Capp TE; -- Mike Dennis RB; 27 Claudis James WR; Reserve list: 29 Dave Dunaway WR (Military); 22 Elijah Pitts RB (IR)

Note: Player names in italics indicate rookie

=== Coaching staff ===
Name	Title	Age	College
Vince Lombardi	Head coach	54	Fordham
Phil Bengtson	Defensive Coach	54	Minnesota
Jerry Burns	Defensive Backfield Coach	40	Michigan
Dave Hanner	Defensive line coach	37	Arkansas
Tom McCormick	Offensive Backfield Coach	37	College of Pacific
Bob Schnelker	Offensive End Coach	39	Bowling Green
Ray Wietecha	Offensive line coach	39	Northwestern

== Preseason ==
Week	Date	Opponent	Result	Record	Venue	Recap
1	August 4	College All-Stars	W 27–0	1–0	Soldier Field	
2	August 12	Pittsburgh Steelers	W 31–20	2–0	Lambeau Field	
3	August 18	Chicago Bears	W 18–0	3–0	Milwaukee County Stadium	
4	August 28	at Dallas Cowboys	W 20–3	4–0	Cotton Bowl	
5	September 2	at Cleveland Browns	W 30–21	5–0	Cleveland Stadium	
6	September 9	New York Giants	W 31–14	6–0	Lambeau Field	

== Regular season ==
The Packers finished the regular season 9–4–1. The 1967 NFL season saw the addition of a sixteenth team (the New Orleans Saints) and the two conferences of eight teams each were subdivided into two divisions. The Packers played in the Western Conference and in the Central Division, with the Lions, Bears, and Vikings; each division foe was played twice, and each team in the Century Division and Coastal Division was played once (and no teams in the Capitol Division). Each of the four division winners advanced to the playoffs.

The Packers clinched the Central division title at Wrigley Field on November 26 at 8–2–1, with three games remaining, as the second-place Chicago Bears fell to 5–6. With the rotational system (in place until 1975), they had home field advantage for the playoffs in 1967, with the first round (conference) scheduled at Milwaukee against the Coastal division champion.

Green Bay closed the regular season at home for the first time since 1942. The Packers played their final regular season game in Los Angeles or San Francisco every season from 1950-1966.

=== Schedule ===
Week	Date	Opponent	Result	Record	Venue	Attendance	Sources
1	September 17	**Detroit Lions**	**T** 17–17	0–0–1	Lambeau Field	50,861	
2	September 24	**Chicago Bears**	**W** 13–10	1–0–1	Lambeau Field	50,861	
3	October 1	Atlanta Falcons	**W** 23–0	2–0–1	Milwaukee County Stadium	49,467	
4	October 8	at **Detroit Lions**	**W** 27–17	3–0–1	Tiger Stadium	57,877	
5	October 15	**Minnesota Vikings**	**L** 7–10	3–1–1	Milwaukee County Stadium	49,601	
6	October 22	at New York Giants	**W** 48–21	4–1–1	Yankee Stadium	62,585	
7	October 30	at St. Louis Cardinals	**W** 31–23	5–1–1	Busch Memorial Stadium	49,792	
8	November 5	at Baltimore Colts	**L** 10–13	5–2–1	Memorial Stadium	60,238	
9	November 12	Cleveland Browns	**W** 55–7	6–2–1	Milwaukee County Stadium	50,074	
10	November 19	San Francisco 49ers	**W** 13–0	7–2–1	Lambeau Field	50,861	
11	November 26	at **Chicago Bears**	**W** 17–13	8–2–1	Wrigley Field	47,513	
12	December 3	at **Minnesota Vikings**	**W** 30–27	9–2–1	Metropolitan Stadium	47,693	
13	December 9	at Los Angeles Rams	**L** 24–27	9–3–1	Los Angeles Memorial Coliseum	76,637	
14	December 17	Pittsburgh Steelers	**L** 17–24	9–4–1	Lambeau Field	50,861	
Note: Intra-division opponents are in **bold** text.

=== Standings ===
NFL Central
	W	L	T	PCT	DIV	CONF	PF	PA	STK
Green Bay Packers	9	4	1	.692	4–1–1	6–3–1	332	209	L2
Chicago Bears	7	6	1	.538	3–2–1	5–4–1	239	218	W1
Detroit Lions	5	7	2	.417	1–3–2	3–5–2	260	259	W2
Minnesota Vikings	3	8	3	.273	1–3–2	1–6–3	233	294	L1

Note: Tie games were not officially counted in the standings until 1972.

=== Game summaries ===
==== Week 1 ====
Detroit Lions (0–0) at Green Bay Packers (0–0)

Quarter	1	2	3	4	Total
Lions	10	7	0	0	**17**
Packers	0	0	7	10	**17**

at Lambeau Field • Green Bay, Wisconsin

- Date: September 17
- Game weather: 69 °F (21 °C) • Wind 6 mph
- Game attendance: 50,861
- TV: CBS
- Pro-Football-Reference.com

Game information

Lions

- Milt Plum
  7/17, 41 yards
- Mel Farr
  16 rush, 95 yards
- Pat Studstill
  3 rec, 19 yards

Packers

- Bart Starr
  14/23, 321 yards, 4 int
- Jim Grabowski
  10 rush, 36 yards
- Carroll Dale
  4 rec, 109 yards

Scoring summary

Quarter	Time	Drive			Team	Scoring information	Score	
Quarter	Time	Plays	Yards	TOP	Team	Scoring information	DET	{{{HomeName}}}
1					Lions	Interception returned 24 yards for touchdown by Barney, Walker kick good	7	0
1					Lions	47-yard field goal by Walker	10	0
2					Lions	Marsh 3-yard touchdown run, Walker kick good	17	0
3					Packers	Pitts 3-yard touchdown run, Chandler kick good	17	7
4					Packers	Pitts 2-yard touchdown run, Chandler kick good	17	14
4					Packers	28-yard field goal by Chandler	17	17
"TOP" = time of possession. For other American football terms, see Glossary of American football.							17	17

==== Week 2 vs Bears ====
Week Two: Chicago Bears (0–1) at Green Bay Packers (0–0–1)

Quarter	1	2	3	4	Total
Bears	0	0	3	7	**10**
Packers	0	10	0	3	**13**

at Lambeau Field • Green Bay, Wisconsin

- Date: September 24
- Game weather: 49 °F (9 °C) • Wind 9 miles per hour (14 km/h; 7.8 kn)
- Pro-Football-Reference.com

Game information

Bears

- Larry Rakestraw
  3/7, 16 yards, int
- Gale Sayers
  15 rush, 63 yards, TD
  2 rec, 12 yards

Packers

- Bart Starr
  10/19, 113 yards, 5 int
- Jim Grabowski
  32 rush, 111 yards, TD
- Carroll Dale
  4 rec, 58 yards

Scoring summary

Quarter	Time	Drive			Team	Scoring information	Score	
Quarter	Time	Plays	Yards	TOP	Team	Scoring information	CHI	GB
2					Packers	Jim Grabowski 2-yard touchdown run, Don Chandler kick good	0	7
2					Packers	20-yard field goal by Don Chandler	0	10
3					Bears	22-yard field goal by Mac Percival	3	10
4					Bears	Gale Sayers 13-yard touchdown run, Mac Percival kick good	10	10
4					Packers	46-yard field goal by Don Chandler	10	13
"TOP" = time of possession. For other American football terms, see Glossary of American football.							10	13

==== Week 3 ====
Team	1	2	3	4	Total
Falcons	0	0	0	0	0
• Packers	7	9	0	7	23

- Date: October 1
- Location: Milwaukee County Stadium

==== Week 4 ====
Team	1	2	3	4	Total
• Packers	0	7	3	17	27
Lions	3	7	0	7	17

- Date: October 8
- Location: Tiger Stadium

==== Week 5 ====
Team	1	2	3	4	Total
• Vikings	0	0	0	10	10
Packers	0	7	0	0	7

- Date: October 15
- Location: Milwaukee County Stadium

==== Week 6 ====
Team	1	2	3	4	Total
• Packers	7	3	10	28	48
Giants	0	14	0	7	21

- Date: October 22
- Location: Yankee Stadium

==== Week 7 ====
Team	1	2	3	4	Total
• Packers	7	7	3	14	31
Cardinals	3	17	0	3	23

- Date: October 30
- Location: Busch Stadium

==== Week 8 ====
Team	1	2	3	4	Total
Packers	0	3	0	7	10
• Colts	0	0	0	13	13

- Date: November 5
- Location: Memorial Stadium

==== Week 9 ====
Team	1	2	3	4	Total
Browns	7	0	0	0	7
• Packers	35	10	3	7	55

- Date: November 12
- Location: Milwaukee County Stadium

==== Week 10 ====
Team	1	2	3	4	Total
49ers	0	0	0	0	0
• Packers	3	7	3	0	13

- Date: November 19
- Location: Lambeau Field

==== Week 11 ====
Team	1	2	3	4	Total
• Packers	7	7	3	0	17
Bears	7	3	0	3	13

- Date: November 26
- Location: Wrigley Field

==== Week 12 ====
Team	1	2	3	4	Total
• Packers	3	10	14	3	30
Vikings	3	7	7	10	27

- Date: December 3
- Location: Metropolitan Stadium

==== Week 13 ====
Team	1	2	3	4	Total
Packers	7	3	7	7	24
• Rams	0	7	10	10	27

- Date: December 9
- Location: Los Angeles Memorial Coliseum

==== Week 14 ====
Team	1	2	3	4	Total
• Steelers	7	7	10	0	24
Packers	0	10	0	7	17

- Date: December 17
- Location: Lambeau Field

== Postseason ==
=== Western Conference Championship ===
Green Bay Packers 28, Los Angeles Rams 7

Quarter	1	2	3	4	Total
Rams	7	0	0	0	7
Packers	14	7	7	0	28

at Milwaukee County Stadium, Milwaukee, Wisconsin

- Date: December 23, 1967
- Game attendance: 49,861

Game information
First quarter
- LA – Bernie Casey 29-yard pass from Roman Gabriel (Bruce Gossett kick) – Rams 7–0
- GB – Travis Williams 46-yard run (Don Chandler kick) – Tie 7–7
- GB – Carroll Dale 17-yard pass from Bart Starr (Don Chandler kick) – Packers 14–7

Second quarter

- GB – Chuck Mercein 6-yard run (Don Chandler kick) – Packers 21–7

Third quarter

- GB – Travis Williams 3-yard run (Don Chandler kick) – Packers 28–7

The Green Bay Packers defeated the Los Angeles Rams 28–7 on December 23, 1967, at Milwaukee County Stadium, in Milwaukee, Wisconsin.The Packers scored four touchdowns, including two touchdown runs by Travis Williams. With the win the Packers advanced to the NFL Championship game. Packers go to the NFL Championship Game and win to the Cowboys in the Ice Bowl 21-17. And win Super Bowl II to the Raiders 33-14.

=== NFL Championship (“Ice Bowl”) ===
Green Bay Packers 27, Dallas Cowboys 13

Quarter	1	2	3	4	Total
Cowboys	0	10	0	7	17
Packers	7	7	0	7	21

at Lambeau Field, Green Bay, Wisconsin

- Date: December 31, 1967
- Game attendance: 50,861
- Referee: Norm Schachter
- TV: CBS

Game information
First quarter
- GB – Boyd Dowler 8-yard pass from Bart Starr (Don Chandler kick) – Packers 7–0

Second quarter

- GB – Boyd Dowler 46-yard pass from Bart Starr (Don Chandler kick) – Packers 14–0
- DAL – George Andrie 7-yard fumble return (Danny Villanueva kick) – Packers 14–7
- DAL – Danny Villanueva 21-yard field goal – Packers 14–10

Fourth quarter

- DAL – Lance Rentzel 50-yard pass from Dan Reeves (Danny Villanueva kick) – Cowboys 17–14
- GB – Bart Starr 1-yard run (Don Chandler kick) – Packers 21–17

The Packers advanced to the NFL Championship game and faced the Dallas Cowboys in the NFL Championship Game. The game was played on December 31, 1967, at Lambeau Field in Green Bay, Wisconsin. The official game-time temperature was −13 °F (−25 °C), with a wind chill around −48 °F (−44 °C). The bitter cold overwhelmed Lambeau Field's new turf heating system, leaving the playing surface hard as a rock and nearly as smooth as ice. The officials were unable to use their whistles after the opening kickoff when a whistle stuck to a referee's lips.

Early in the game, the Packers jumped to a 14–0 lead with a pair of touchdown passes from Bart Starr to wide receiver Boyd Dowler. Green Bay committed two costly turnovers in the second quarter that led to ten Dallas points. Neither team was able to score any points in the third quarter, but then on the first play of the final period, the Cowboys took a 17–14 lead with running back Dan Reeves' 50-yard touchdown pass to wide receiver Lance Rentzel on a halfback option play.

Starting from his own 32-yard line with 4:54 left in the game, Starr led his team down the field to the one-yard line. Running back Donny Anderson attempted two runs into the end zone, but fell short. Facing a third down with sixteen seconds left in the game, Starr executed a quarterback sneak behind center Ken Bowman and guard Jerry Kramer's block through defensive tackle Jethro Pugh, scoring a touchdown that gave the Packers a 21–17 win and their unprecedented third consecutive NFL championship. Packers go to Super Bowl II and win 33-14 to the Raiders.

=== Super Bowl II ===
Green Bay Packers 33, Oakland Raiders 14

Quarter	1	2	3	4	Total
Packers	3	13	10	7	33
Raiders	0	7	0	7	14

at Orange Bowl, Miami, Florida

- Date: January 14, 1968
- Game time: 3:05 p.m. EST
- Game weather: 68 °F (20 °C), partly cloudy
- Game attendance: 75,546

Game information
First quarter
- GB – Don Chandler 39-yard field goal – Packers 3–0

Second quarter

- GB – Don Chandler 20-yard field goal – Packers 6–0
- GB – Boyd Dowler 62-yard pass from Bart Starr (Don Chandler kick) – Packers 13–0
- OAK – Bill Miller 23-yard pass from Daryle Lamonica (George Blanda kick) – Packers 13–7
- GB – Don Chandler 43-yard field goal – Packers 16–7

Third quarter

- GB – Donny Anderson 2-yard run (Don Chandler kick) – Packers 23–7
- GB – Don Chandler 31-yard field goal – Packers 26–7

Fourth quarter

- GB – Herb Adderley 60-yard interception return (Don Chandler kick) – Packers 33–7
- OAK – Bill Miller 23-yard pass from Daryle Lamonica (George Blanda kick) – Packers 33–14

After beating the Cowboys in the NFL Championship game, the Packers advanced to the AFL-NFL World Championship Game to face the American Football League champions, the Oakland Raiders. The Packers scored early with two field goals from kicker Don Chandler. Later in the second quarter, quarterback Bart Starr threw a 62-yard touchdown pass to receiver Boyd Dowler to give the Packers a 13–0 lead. Oakland struck back on their next possession when quarterback Daryle Lamonica completed a 23-yard touchdown pass to receiver Bill Miller. At the end of the half, Don Chandler added another field goal, making the score 16–7.

In the second half, Starr completed a 35-yard pass to receiver Max McGee, which was the last reception of McGee's career. The pass helped set up Donny Anderson's two-yard touchdown run. Early in the fourth quarter, Chandler kicked his fourth field goal, making the score 26–7. After the field goal, Starr was injured on a sack and was replaced by Zeke Bratkowski. Later in the fourth quarter, Packers defensive back Herb Adderley intercepted a Raiders pass and returned it 60 yards for a touchdown, making the score 33–7. The Raiders managed to score a second touchdown on a 23-yard touchdown pass from Lamonica to Bill Miller late in the fourth quarter. The Packers went on to win the game 33–14. Coaching his last game for the Packers, Vince Lombardi was carried off the field in victory. Packers win but in 1968 finished 6-7-1 to miss the playoffs.

== Season statistical leaders ==
- Passing yards: Bart Starr, 1823
- Passing touchdowns: Bart Starr, 9
- Rushing yards: Jim Grabowski, 466
- Rushing touchdowns: Elijah Pitts and Donny Anderson, 7
- Receiving yards: Boyd Dowler, 836
- Receiving touchdowns: Carroll Dale, 5
- Points: Don Chandler, 96
- Kickoff return yards: Travis Williams, 533
- Punt return yards: Donny Anderson, 98
- Interceptions: Bob Jeter, 8
