= 1967 Minnesota Vikings season =

NFL team season

- General manager: Jim Finks
- Head coach: Bud Grant
- Home stadium: Metropolitan Stadium

Results
- Record: 3–8–3
- Division place: 4th NFL Central
- Playoffs: Did not qualify
- All-Pros: C Mick Tingelhoff (2nd team)
- Pro Bowlers: T Grady Alderman; FB Bill Brown; C Mick Tingelhoff

Uniform
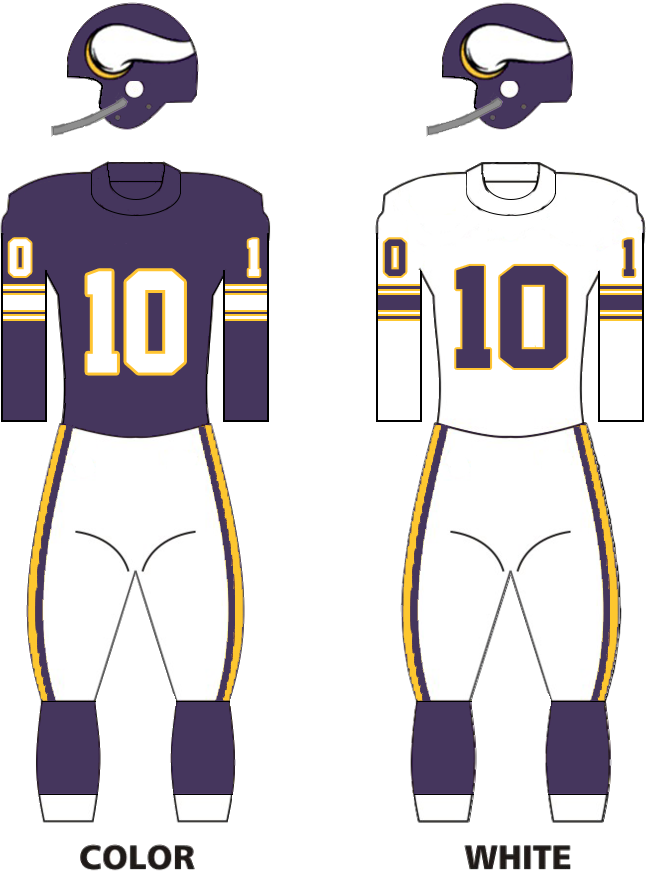

The 1967 season was the Minnesota Vikings' seventh in the National Football League. After the resignation of head coach Norm Van Brocklin at the end of the previous season, the Vikings hired Bud Grant, previously the head coach of the Canadian Football League's Winnipeg Blue Bombers, who led the team to a 3–8–3 record.

== 1967 draft ==
Pro Bowler
Hall of Famer

1967 Minnesota Vikings Draft
Draft order		Player name	Position	College	Notes
Round	Selection	Player name	Position	College	Notes
1	2	Clint Jones	Running back	Michigan State	from Giants (Note: The Vikings traded QB Fran Tarkenton to the Giants in exchange for a first- (2nd overall), a second- (28th overall), a 1968 first- (1st overall) and a 1969 second-round selection (39th overall).)
1	8	Gene Washington	Wide receiver	Michigan State	
1	15	Alan Page	Defensive end	Notre Dame	from Rams (Note: The Vikings traded their second-round selection (33rd overall), TE Hal Bedsole and RB Tommy Mason to the Rams in exchange for a first-round selection (15th overall) and TE/LB Marlin McKeever.)
2	28	Bob Grim	Running back	Oregon State	from Giants
2	33	Traded to the Los Angeles Rams			
3	61	Earl Denny	Wide receiver	Missouri	
4	87	Al Coleman	Defensive back	Tennessee A&I	
5	115	Ken Last	Wide receiver	Minnesota	
6	140	Traded to the Pittsburgh Steelers (Note: The Vikings traded their sixth-round selection (140th overall) to the Steelers in exchange for RB Phil King.)			
7	167	Bobby Bryant	Cornerback	South Carolina	
8	192	Traded to the Pittsburgh Steelers (Note: The Vikings traded their eighth-round selection (192nd overall) to the Steelers in exchange for LB Dave Tobey.)			
8	197	John Beasley	Wide receiver	California	from Redskins (Note: The Vikings traded DE Bill Briggs to the Redskins in exchange for an eighth-round selection (197th overall).)
9	219	Bill Morris	Guard	Holy Cross	
10	244	Pete Tatman	Running back	Nebraska	
11	271	Bob Trygstad	Defensive tackle	Washington State	
12	296	Fred Cremer	Guard	St. John's (MN)	
13	323	Charles Hardt	Defensive back	Tulsa	
14	348	Jim Hargrove	Linebacker	Howard Payne	
15	375	Jim Shea	Defensive back	Eastern New Mexico	
16	400	Gene Beard	Defensive back	Virginia Union	
17	427	Dick Wagoner	Defensive back	Bowling Green	

== Roster ==
1967 Minnesota Vikings roster
Quarterbacks (QB): 17 Bob Berry; 11 Joe Kapp; 15 Ron Vander Kelen; Running backs (RB): 30 Bill Brown; 28 Earl Denny; 26 Clinton Jones; 21 Jim Lindsey; 41 Dave Osborn; 33 Pete Tatman; Wide receivers (WR): 85 Paul Flatley; 27 Bob Grim; 82 Jim Phillips; 84 Gene Washington; Tight ends (TE): 87 John Beasley; 86 Marlin McKeever	Offensive linemen (OL): 67 Grady Alderman T; 61 Larry Bowie G; 75 Bob Breitenstein T; 71 Doug Davis T; 66 John Pentecost G; 64 Milt Sunde G; 53 Mick Tingelhoff C; 63 Jim Vellone G; Defensive linemen (DL): 76 Paul Dickson DT; 81 Carl Eller DE; 77 Gary Larsen DT; 70 Jim Marshall DE; 88 Alan Page DT; 73 Jerry Shay DT; 69 Arnie Simkus DE	Linebackers (LB): 54 Paul Faust OLB; 55 Don Hansen OLB; 50 Jim Hargrove MLB; 36 John Kirby OLB; 59 Lonnie Warwick MLB; 60 Roy Winston OLB; Defensive backs (DB): 37 Al Coleman FS; 49 Dale Hackbart FS; 29 Karl Kassulke SS; 24 Brady Keys CB; 46 Earsell Mackbee CB; 45 Ed Sharockman CB; Special teams (ST): 14 Fred Cox K; 39 Bobby Walden P	Practice squad: 20 Bobby Bryant CB; Reserve: -- Gene Beard CB (Military); 22 Jeff Jordan S (IR); Rookies in italics

== Preseason ==
Week	Date	Opponent	Result	Record	Venue	Attendance
1	August 12	Philadelphia Eagles	W 34–0	1–0	Skelly Stadium (Tulsa, OK)	24,500
2	August 18	at Denver Broncos (AFL)	L 9–14	1–1	University of Denver Stadium	31,850
3	August 27	at New York Giants	L 3–21	1–2	Yale Bowl (New Haven, CT)	43,584
4	September 2	Atlanta Falcons	W 16–3	2–2	Cleveland Stadium (Cleveland, OH)	84,236
5	September 10	Cleveland Browns	L 14–42	2–3	Metropolitan Stadium	40,012

== Regular season ==
=== Schedule ===
Week	Date	Opponent	Result	Record	Venue	Attendance	Sources
1	September 17	San Francisco 49ers	**L** 21–27	0–1	Metropolitan Stadium	39,638	
2	September 22	at Los Angeles Rams	**L** 3–39	0–2	Los Angeles Memorial Coliseum	52,255	
3	October 1	**Chicago Bears**	**L** 7–17	0–3	Metropolitan Stadium	44,868	
4	October 8	St. Louis Cardinals	**L** 24–34	0–4	Metropolitan Stadium	40,017	
5	October 15	at **Green Bay Packers**	**W** 10–7	1–4	Milwaukee County Stadium	49,601	
6	October 22	Baltimore Colts	**T** 20–20	1–4–1	Metropolitan Stadium	47,693	
7	October 29	at Atlanta Falcons	**L** 20–21	1–5–1	Atlanta Stadium	52,859	
8	November 5	New York Giants	**W** 27–24	2–5–1	Metropolitan Stadium	44,960	
9	November 12	**Detroit Lions**	**T** 10–10	2–5–2	Metropolitan Stadium	40,032	
10	November 19	at Cleveland Browns	**L** 10–14	2–6–2	Cleveland Stadium	68,431	
11	November 26	at Pittsburgh Steelers	**W** 41–27	3–6–2	Pitt Stadium	23,773	
12	December 3	**Green Bay Packers**	**L** 27–30	3–7–2	Metropolitan Stadium	47,693	
13	December 10	at **Chicago Bears**	**T** 10–10	3–7–3	Wrigley Field	40,110	
14	December 17	at **Detroit Lions**	**L** 3–14	3–8–3	Tiger Stadium	44,874	
Note: Intra-division opponents are in **bold** text.

=== Standings ===
NFL Central
	W	L	T	PCT	DIV	CONF	PF	PA	STK
Green Bay Packers	9	4	1	.692	4–1–1	6–3–1	332	209	L2
Chicago Bears	7	6	1	.538	3–2–1	5–4–1	239	218	W1
Detroit Lions	5	7	2	.417	1–3–2	3–5–2	260	259	W2
Minnesota Vikings	3	8	3	.273	1–3–2	1–6–3	233	294	L1

Note: Tie games were not officially counted in the standings until 1972.

== Statistics ==
=== Team leaders ===
Category	Player(s)	Value
Passing yards	Joe Kapp	1,386
Passing touchdowns	Joe Kapp	8
Rushing yards	Dave Osborn	972
Rushing touchdowns	Bill Brown	5
Receiving yards	Gene Washington	384
Receiving touchdowns	John Beasley	4
Points	Fred Cox	77
Kickoff return yards	Clint Jones	597
Punt return yards	Bob Grim	101
Interceptions	Earsell Mackbee	5

=== League rankings ===
Category	Total yards	Yards per game	NFL rank (out of 16)
Passing offense	1,667	119.1	14th
Rushing offense	1,811	129.4	9th
Total offense	3,478	248.4	14th
Passing defense	1,752	125.1	3rd
Rushing defense	2,104	150.3	15th
Total defense	3,856	275.4	6th
