= 1967 Dallas Cowboys season =

NFL team season

- Owner: Clint Murchison, Jr.
- General manager: Tex Schramm
- Head coach: Tom Landry
- Home stadium: Cotton Bowl

Results
- Record: 9–5
- Division place: 1st NFL Capitol
- Playoffs: Won Eastern Conference Championship Game (vs. Browns) 52–14; Lost NFL Championship (at Packers) 17–21
- All-Pros: 8: FB Don Perkins; T Ralph Neely; DT Bob Lilly; DE George Andrie; DE Bob Hayes; LB Chuck Howley; CB Cornell Green; FS Mel Renfro
- Pro Bowlers: 10: QB Don Meredith; FB Don Perkins; T Ralph Neely; CB Cornell Green; DT Bob Lilly; DE Bob Hayes; DE George Andrie; LB Chuck Howley; LB Lee Roy Jordan; FS Mel Renfro

The 1967 Dallas Cowboys season was their eighth in the league. The team posted a 9–5 record and won the new four-team Capitol Division. The Cowboys hosted the Century Division winner Cleveland Browns at the Cotton Bowl and won 52–14 for the Eastern Conference title. This gained a rematch the following week for the NFL title with the two-time defending champion Green Bay Packers. Played in frigid sub-zero and windy conditions at Lambeau Field in Green Bay on December 31, the Packers scored a late touchdown to win by four points for their third consecutive NFL title. Green Bay easily won Super Bowl II two weeks later over the Oakland Raiders.

== Offseason ==
=== NFL draft ===
1967 Dallas Cowboys draft
Round	Pick	Player	Position	College	Notes
3	76	Phil Clark	DB	Northwestern	
4	103	Curtis Marker	OG	Northern Michigan	
6	157	Sims Stokes	WR	Northern Arizona	
7	182	Rayfield Wright * ^{†}	OT	Fort Valley State	
8	208	Steve Laub	QB	Illinois Wesleyan	
9	234	Byron Morgan	DB	Findlay	
10	260	Eugene Bowen	RB	Tennessee State	
11	285	Pat Riley	WR	Kentucky	Signed with the NBA
12	312	Harold Deters	K	NC State	
13	338	Al Kerkian	DE	Akron	
14	364	Tommy Boyd	OG	Tarleton State	
15	390	Leavie David	DB	Edward Waters	
14	206	Lewis Turner	RB	Norfolk State	
16	416	Paul Brothers	QB	Oregon State	Signed with the CFL
17	442	George Adams	LB	Morehead State	
Made roster † Pro Football Hall of Fame * Made at least one Pro Bowl during career

=== Undrafted free agents ===
1967 undrafted free agents of note
Player	Position	College
Coy Bacon	Defensive lineman	Jackson State
Nick Czubenko	Defensive tackle	Tulsa
Ron East	Defensive tackle	Montana State
Tom Frazier	Linebacker	Wyoming
Ron Kenney	Tackle	Rutgers
Jim Newson	Safety	Washington State
Mac Percival	Kicker	Texas Tech

== Roster ==
Dallas Cowboys 1967 roster
Quarterbacks: 17 Don Meredith; 14 Craig Morton; 13 Jerry Rhome; Running backs: 46 Craig Baynham; 32 Walt Garrison; 43 Don Perkins; 30 Dan Reeves; 25 Les Shy; Wide receivers: 35 Pete Gent; 22 Bob Hayes; 19 Lance Rentzel; 31 Sims Stokes; Tight ends: 82 Frank Clarke; 84 Pettis Norman	Offensive linemen: 68 Jim Boeke T; 53 Mike Connelly C; 62 Leon Donohue G; 72 Tony Liscio T; 73 Ralph Neely T; 76 John Niland G; 57 Malcolm Walker C/G; 65 John Wilbur G; Defensive linemen: 66 George Andrie DE; 79 Ron East DT; 74 Bob Lilly DT; 75 Jethro Pugh DT; 77 Larry Stephens DE; 71 Willie Townes DE	Linebackers: 52 Dave Edwards OLB; 56 Harold Hays OLB; 54 Chuck Howley OLB; 55 Lee Roy Jordan MLB; 50 Jerry Tubbs MLB; Defensive backs: 37 Phil Clark CB; 45 Dick Daniels CB/S; 27 Mike Gaechter SS; 34 Cornell Green CB; 23 Mike Johnson CB; 20 Mel Renfro FS; Special teams: 11 Danny Villanueva P/K	Reserve lists: 26 Buddy Dial WR (IR); 51 Dave Manders C (IR); Taxi squad: -- Leavie Davis S; 83 Harold Deters K; 67 Bob Schmitz LB; 12 Ron Widby P; 85 Rayfield Wright TE; Rookies in italics 40 active, 7 inactive

== Schedule ==
Week	Date	Opponent	Result	Record	Game Site	Attendance	Recap
1	September 17	at Cleveland Browns	**W** 21–14	1–0	Cleveland Stadium	81,039	Recap
2	September 24	New York Giants	**W** 38–24	2–0	Cotton Bowl	66,209	Recap
3	October 1	Los Angeles Rams	**L** 13–35	2–1	Cotton Bowl	75,229	Recap
4	October 8	at **Washington Redskins**	**W** 17–14	3–1	D.C. Stadium	50,566	Recap
5	October 15	**New Orleans Saints**	**W** 14–10	4–1	Cotton Bowl	64,128	Recap
6	October 22	at Pittsburgh Steelers	**W** 24–21	5–1	Pitt Stadium	39,641	Recap
7	October 29	at **Philadelphia Eagles**	**L** 14–21	5–2	Franklin Field	60,740	Recap
8	November 5	Atlanta Falcons	**W** 37–7	6–2	Cotton Bowl	54,751	Recap
9	November 12	at **New Orleans Saints**	**W** 27–10	7–2	Tulane Stadium	83,437	Recap
10	November 19	**Washington Redskins**	**L** 20–27	7–3	Cotton Bowl	75,538	Recap
11	November 23	St. Louis Cardinals	**W** 46–21	8–3	Cotton Bowl	68,787	Recap
12	December 3	at Baltimore Colts	**L** 17–23	8–4	Memorial Stadium	60,238	Recap
13	December 10	**Philadelphia Eagles**	**W** 38–17	9–4	Cotton Bowl	55,834	Recap
14	December 16	at San Francisco 49ers	**L** 16–24	9–5	Kezar Stadium	27,182	Recap
Note: Intra-division opponents are in **bold** text.

== Game summaries ==
=== Week 14 ===
Team	1	2	3	4	Total
Cowboys	3	0	0	13	16
• 49ers	7	14	3	0	24

- Date: December 16
- Location: Kezar Stadium

== Standings ==
NFL Capitol
	W	L	T	PCT	DIV	CONF	PF	PA	STK
Dallas Cowboys	9	5	0	.643	4–2	8–2	342	268	L1
Philadelphia Eagles	6	7	1	.462	3–2–1	5–4–1	351	409	W1
Washington Redskins	5	6	3	.455	2–3–1	4–5–1	347	353	L1
New Orleans Saints	3	11	0	.214	2–4	2–8	233	379	W1

Note: Tie games were not officially counted in the standings until 1972.

== Postseason ==
Round	Date	Opponent	Result	Game Site	Attendance	Recap
Eastern Conference	December 24, 1967	Cleveland Browns	W 52–14	Cotton Bowl	70,786	Recap
NFL Championship	December 31, 1967	at Green Bay Packers	L 17–21	Lambeau Field	50,861	Recap
