= Bernie Casey =

American football player and actor (1939–2017)

- Casey in 1964

No. 30, 25
- Positions: Flanker, halfback, tight end

Personal information
- Born: June 8, 1939; Wyco, West Virginia, U.S.
- Died: September 19, 2017 (aged 78); Los Angeles, California, U.S.
- Listed height: 6 ft 4 in (1.93 m)
- Listed weight: 215 lb (98 kg)

Career information
- High school: East (Columbus, Ohio)
- College: Bowling Green
- NFL draft: 1961: 1st round, 9th overall pick
- AFL draft: 1961: 9th round, 70th overall pick

Career history
- San Francisco 49ers (1961–1966); Los Angeles Rams (1967–1968)

Awards and highlights
- Pro Bowl (1967); Second-team Little All-American (1960)

Career NFL statistics
- Receptions: 359
- Receiving yards: 5,444
- Receiving touchdowns: 40
- Stats at Pro Football Reference

Bernard Terry Casey (June 8, 1939 – September 19, 2017) was an American professional football player and actor. He was a football player and All-American hurdler at Bowling Green State University, before playing professionally as a wide receiver in the National Football League (NFL), first for the San Francisco 49ers and then the Los Angeles Rams. He made his acting debut in the Western film Guns of the Magnificent Seven (1969). After retiring from football, he became a leading man and action hero in the burgeoning blaxploitation film genre of the 1970s.

Casey played prominent roles in films like Brian's Song (1971), Boxcar Bertha (1972), Cleopatra Jones (1973), The Man Who Fell to Earth (1976), Sharky's Machine (1981), Revenge of the Nerds (1984), Spies Like Us (1985), and Bill & Ted's Excellent Adventure (1989). He won an NAACP Image Award for his portrayal of basketball player Maurice Stokes in the biographical film Maurie (1973). He also played Felix Leiter in the James Bond film Never Say Never Again (1983) and starred in the miniseries Roots: The Next Generations.

In addition to acting and athletics, Casey was also a published poet and a painter.

== Early life and amateur athletics ==
Casey was born in Wyco, West Virginia, the son of Flossie (Coleman) and Frank Leslie Casey. He graduated from East High School in Columbus, Ohio. He then attended Bowling Green State University.

Casey was a record-breaking hurdler for Bowling Green State University and helped the 1959 football team win a small college national championship. Casey earned All-America recognition and a trip to the finals at the U.S. Olympic Trials in 1960. In addition to national honors, he won three consecutive Mid-American Conference titles in the high-hurdles, 1958–60.

== Professional football career ==
Casey was the ninth overall selection in the first round of the 1961 NFL draft, taken by the San Francisco 49ers. He played eight NFL seasons (several positions, first five seasons mainly a halfback, last three seasons a flanker (setback wide receiver)): six with the 49ers and two with the Los Angeles Rams.

His best-known play came in 1967 for the Rams in the penultimate game of the regular season against the Green Bay Packers. The Rams needed to win to keep their division title hopes alive, but trailed 24–20 with under a minute to play. Facing fourth down, the Packers lined up to punt, but Tony Guillory blocked the Donny Anderson punt and Claude Crabb returned it to the Packer five-yard line. After an incomplete pass, Casey caught the winning touchdown pass from Roman Gabriel with under thirty seconds to play to give the Rams a 27–24 victory. The Rams defeated the Baltimore Colts the following week to win the Coastal Division title at 11–1–2.

== NFL career statistics ==
Legend
| **Bold** | Career high |

=== Regular season ===
| Year | Team | Games | | Receiving | | | | |
| Year | Team | GP | GS | Rec | Yds | Avg | Lng | TD |
|---|---|---|---|---|---|---|---|---|
| 1961 | SFO | 12 | 2 | 10 | 185 | 18.5 | 51 | 1 |
| 1962 | SFO | 13 | 11 | 53 | 819 | 15.5 | 48 | 6 |
| 1963 | SFO | 14 | 14 | 47 | 762 | 16.2 | **68** | 7 |
| 1964 | SFO | 13 | 13 | 58 | 808 | 13.9 | 63 | 4 |
| 1965 | SFO | 14 | 14 | **59** | 765 | 13.0 | 59 | **8** |
| 1966 | SFO | 13 | 13 | 50 | 669 | 13.4 | 32 | 1 |
| 1967 | RAM | 14 | 14 | 53 | **871** | 16.4 | 57 | **8** |
| 1968 | RAM | 12 | 12 | 29 | 565 | **19.5** | 55 | 5 |
| | | 105 | 93 | 359 | 5,444 | 15.2 | 68 | 40 |

=== Playoffs ===
| Year | Team | Games | | Receiving | | | | |
| Year | Team | GP | GS | Rec | Yds | Avg | Lng | TD |
|---|---|---|---|---|---|---|---|---|
| 1967 | RAM | 1 | 1 | 5 | 82 | 16.4 | 29 | 1 |
| | | 1 | 1 | 5 | 82 | 16.4 | 29 | 1 |

== Acting career ==
Casey began his acting career in the film Guns of the Magnificent Seven, a sequel to The Magnificent Seven. Then he played opposite fellow former NFL star Jim Brown in the crime dramas ...tick...tick...tick... and Black Gunn. He played a leading role in the 1972 science fiction TV film Gargoyles. He also played Tamara Dobson's love interest in 1973's Cleopatra Jones.

Casey in 2014

From there he moved between performances on television and the big screen such as playing team captain for the Chicago Bears in the TV film Brian's Song. In 1979, he starred as widower Mike Harris in the NBC television series Harris and Company, the first weekly American TV drama series centered on a black family. In 1980, he played Major Jeff Spender in the television mini-series The Martian Chronicles, based on the novel by Ray Bradbury.

In 1981, Casey played a detective opposite Burt Reynolds in the feature film Sharky's Machine, directed by Reynolds. The two reunited a few years later for the crime story Rent-a-Cop.

In 1983, he played the role of CIA agent Felix Leiter in the non-Eon Productions James Bond film Never Say Never Again. He appeared in Revenge of the Nerds and had a comedic role as Colonel Rhombus in the John Landis film Spies Like Us. Casey also appeared in the film Hit Man.

Also during his career, he worked with such well-known directors as Martin Scorsese in his 1972 film Boxcar Bertha and appeared on such television series as The Streets of San Francisco.

He played a version of himself, and other football players turned actors, in Keenen Ivory Wayans's 1988 comedic film I'm Gonna Git You Sucka. He played high school history teacher Mr. Ryan, in Bill & Ted's Excellent Adventure, released in 1989. Casey appeared as a very influential prisoner with outside connections in Walter Hill's Another 48 Hrs.. In 1992, he appeared as a Naval officer on the battleship USS Missouri in Under Siege.

In 1994, Casey guest-starred in a two-episode story arc in Star Trek: Deep Space Nine as the Maquis leader Lieutenant Commander Cal Hudson, and in 1995 as a guest-star on both SeaQuest 2032 as Admiral VanAlden and Babylon 5 as Derek Cranston. In 2006, he co-starred in the film When I Find the Ocean alongside such actors as Lee Majors. His lasting acting role was in the low-budget horror film Vegas Vampires, directed by fellow football player-turned-blaxploitation icon Fred Williamson.

== Personal life ==
Casey enjoyed painting and writing poetry. Look at the People, a book of his paintings and poems, was published by Doubleday in 1969.

== Death ==
Casey died at Cedars-Sinai Medical Center in Los Angeles on September 19, 2017, after a stroke.

== Filmography ==
=== Film ===
| Year | Title | Role | Notes | Ref. |
|---|---|---|---|---|
| 1969 | Guns of the Magnificent Seven | Cassie | | |
| 1970 | ...tick...tick...tick... | George Harley | | |
| 1971 | Black Chariot | The Drifter | | |
| 1972 | Boxcar Bertha | Von Morton | | |
| 1972 | Black Gunn | Seth | | |
| 1972 | Hit Man | Tyrone Tackett | | |
| 1973 | Cleopatra Jones | Reuben Masters | | |
| 1973 | Maurie | Maurice Stokes | | |
| 1975 | Cornbread, Earl and Me | Officer Larry Atkins | | |
| 1976 | Dr. Black, Mr. Hyde | Dr. Henry Pride | | |
| 1976 | The Man Who Fell to Earth | Mr. Peters | | |
| 1977 | Brothers | David Thomas | | |
| 1981 | Sharky's Machine | Detective Arch Driscoll | | |
| 1983 | Never Say Never Again | Felix Leiter | | |
| 1984 | Revenge of the Nerds | U.N. Jefferson | | |
| 1985 | Spies Like Us | Colonel Rhombus | | |
| 1987 | Steele Justice | Detective Tom Reese | | |
| 1987 | Amazon Women on the Moon | Major General Hadley | (segment "The Unknown Soldier"); Uncredited | |
| 1987 | Rent-A-Cop | Lemar | | |
| 1988 | Backfire | Clinton James | | |
| 1988 | I'm Gonna Git You Sucka | John Slade | | |
| 1989 | Bill & Ted's Excellent Adventure | Mr. Ryan | | |
| 1990 | Another 48 Hrs. | Kirkland Smith | | |
| 1991 | Chains of Gold | Sergeant Falco | | |
| 1992 | Under Siege | Commander Harris | | |
| 1993 | The Cemetery Club | John | | |
| 1993 | Street Knight | Raymond | | |
| 1994 | The Glass Shield | James Locket | | |
| 1995 | In the Mouth of Madness | Robinson | | |
| 1995 | Once Upon a Time... When We Were Colored | Mr. Walter | | |
| 1997 | The Dinner | Good Brother | | |
| 2001 | Tomcats | Officer Hurley | | |
| 2002 | Jim Brown: All-American | Himself | | |
| 2002 | On the Edge | Rex Stevens | | |
| 2006 | When I Find the Ocean | Amos Jackson | | |
| 2007 | Vegas Vampires | Bloodhound Bill | Final film role | |

=== Television ===
| Year | Title | Role | Notes | Ref. |
|---|---|---|---|---|
| 1971 | Brian's Song | J.C. Caroline | Television film | |
| 1972 | Cade's County | Patrick | Episode: "Slay Ride" | |
| 1972 | Longstreet | Ray Eller | Episode: "Field of Honor" | |
| 1972 | The Streets of San Francisco | Richard | Episode: "Timelock" | |
| 1972 | Gargoyles | The Gargoyle | Television film | |
| 1974 | The Snoop Sisters | Willie Bates | Episode: "Fear Is a Free-Throw" | |
| 1974 | Panic on the 5:22 | Wendell Weaver | Television film | |
| 1975 | Police Story | Duke Windsor | Episode: "Company Man" | |
| 1976 | Joe Forrester | Cleveland | Episode: "The Answers" | |
| 1977 | Police Woman | P.J. Johnson | Episode: "Once a Snitch" | |
| 1977 | Police Story | Hamilton Ward | Episode: "The Six Foot Stretch" | |
| 1977 | Mary Jane Harper Cried Last Night | Dave Williams | Television film | |
| 1977 | It Happened at Lakewood Manor | Vince | Television film | |
| 1978 | Ring of Passion | Joe Louis | Television film | |
| 1978 | Love Is Not Enough | Mike Harris | Television film | |
| 1979 | Roots: The Next Generations | Bubba Haywood | Miniseries | |
| 1979 | Harris and Company | Mike Harris | 4 episodes | |
| 1980 | The Martian Chronicles | Major Jeff Spender | Miniseries | |
| 1981 | The Sophisticated Gents | Shurley Walker | Miniseries | |
| 1982 | A House Divided: Denmark Vesey's Rebellion | Slave | Television film | |
| 1982 | Trapper John, M.D. | Thornie Thornberry | Episode: "Love and Marriage" | |
| 1982 | Hear No Evil | Inspector Monday | Television film | |
| 1983–1984 | Bay City Blues | Ozzie Peoples | 8 episodes | |
| 1992 | Revenge of the Nerds III: The Next Generation | U.N. Jefferson | Television film | |
| 1994 | Star Trek: Deep Space Nine | Calvin Hudson | Episode: "The Maquis" | |
| 1994 | Revenge of the Nerds IV: Nerds in Love | U.N. Jefferson | Television film | |
| 1995 | seaQuest 2032 | Admiral Vanalden | Episode: "Chains of Command" | |
| 1995 | Babylon 5 | Derek Cranston | Episode: "Hunter, Prey" | |
| 2000 | Just Shoot Me! | Himself | 1 episode | |
| 2005 | Girlfriends | Judge Edward Dent | Episode: "Judging Edward" | |

== Awards and nominations ==
| Award | Year | Category | Work | Result |
|---|---|---|---|---|
| NAACP Image Award | 1974 | Outstanding Actor in a Motion Picture | Maurie | Won |
