= 1967 St. Louis Cardinals (NFL) season =

American football team season

1967 St. Louis Cardinals season
- Head coach: Charley Winner
- Home stadium: Busch Memorial Stadium

Results
- Record: 6–7–1
- Division place: 3rd Century Division
- Playoffs: Did not qualify

The 1967 St. Louis Cardinals season was the team's 48th year with the National Football League (NFL) and the 8th season in St. Louis.

== Offseason ==
=== NFL draft ===
1967 St. Louis Cardinals draft
Round	Pick	Player	Position	College	Notes
1	16	Dave Williams	Wide receiver	Washington	
2	43	Bob Rowe	Defensive tackle	Western Michigan	
Made roster

=== Undrafted free agents ===
1967 undrafted free agents of note
Player	Position	College
Bryan Hondru	Guard	Penn State
Bill Nelson	Defensive tackle	South Carolina
Dick Sorkorum	Wide receiver	Paris
Larry Zunich	Running back	Richmond

== Personnel ==
=== Staff / Coaches ===
1967 St. Louis Cardinals staff
Front office: Principal Owner/de facto General Manager - Bill Bidwill; Partial Owner / Team President - Charles Bidwill Jr.; Head coaches: Head Coach – Charley Winner; Offensive coaches: Quarterbacks Coach - Harry Gilmer; Offensive Backs - Rick Forzano; Offensive line – Red Miller; Receivers Coach / Game Scouting – Ken Shipp	Defensive coaches: Defensive Coordinator - Chuck Drulis; Linebackers Coach – Don Shroyer; Defensive Line – Dick Voris; Defensive Backs - Chuck Drulis

=== Roster ===
1967 St. Louis Cardinals roster
Quarterbacks: 17 Jim Hart; 12 Charley Johnson; Running backs: 30 Charlie Bryant; 33 Willis Crenshaw; 22 Prentice Gautt; 27 Roy Shivers; 36 Bill Thornton; Wide receivers: 40 Bobby Joe Conrad; 3 Billy Gambrell; 80 Dave Williams; Tight ends: 83 Chuck Logan; 81 Jackie Smith; 82 Ted Wheeler	Offensive linemen: 61 Bob DeMarco C; 55 Irv Goode G; 64 Ken Gray G; 73 Ernie McMillan T; 74 Bob Reynolds T; 66 Rick Sortun G; 63 Clyde Williams T; Defensive linemen: 83 Don Brumm DE; 74 Fred Heron DE/DT; 89 Dave Long DE; 84 Joe Robb DE; 72 Sam Silas DT; 79 Chuck Walker DT	Linebackers: 87 Jerry Hillebrand MLB; 34 Bill Koman OLB; 60 Dave Meggyesy OLB; 62 Dale Meinert MLB; 67 Larry Stallings OLB; Defensive backs: 20 Mike Barnes FS; 49 Jimmy Burson CB; 37 Pat Fischer CB; 19 Phil Spiller CB/S; 21 Jerry Stovall SS; 45 Bobby Williams CB; 8 Larry Wilson FS; Special teams: 25 Jim Bakken K; 26 Chuck Latourette P	Reserve lists: 52 Dave O'Brien G (IR); 23 Johnny Roland RB (IR); 56 Bill Wosilius LB (IR); Taxi squad: 44 Mike Campbell RB; 69 Bobby Duncum T; 39 Cid Edwards RB; 78 Dan Goich DT; 51 Dick Kasperek C; 75 Bob Rowe DT; 57 Mike Strofolino LB; 16 Tim Van Galder QB; 53 Jamie Rivers LB; rookies in italics

== Regular season ==
=== Schedule ===
Week	Date	Opponent	Result	Record	Venue	Attendance
1	September 17	**New York Giants**	**L** 20–37	0–1	Busch Memorial Stadium	40,801
2	September 24	at **Pittsburgh Steelers**	**W** 28–14	1–1	Pitt Stadium	45,579
3	October 1	Detroit Lions	**W** 38–28	2–1	Busch Memorial Stadium	43,821
4	October 8	at Minnesota Vikings	**W** 34–24	3–1	Metropolitan Stadium	40,017
5	October 15	at **Cleveland Browns**	**L** 16–20	3–2	Cleveland Municipal Stadium	77,813
6	October 22	Philadelphia Eagles	**W** 48–14	4–2	Busch Memorial Stadium	46,562
7	October 30	Green Bay Packers	**L** 23–31	4–3	Busch Memorial Stadium	49,792
8	November 5	at Washington Redskins	**W** 27–21	5–3	D.C. Stadium	50,480
9	November 12	**Pittsburgh Steelers**	**T** 14–14	5–3–1	Busch Memorial Stadium	46,994
10	November 19	at Chicago Bears	**L** 3–30	5–4–1	Wrigley Field	47,417
11	November 23	at Dallas Cowboys	**L** 21–46	5–5–1	Cotton Bowl	68,787
12	December 3	New Orleans Saints	**W** 31–20	6–5–1	Busch Memorial Stadium	41,171
13	December 10	**Cleveland Browns**	**L** 16–20	6–6–1	Busch Memorial Stadium	47,782
14	December 17	at **New York Giants**	**L** 14–37	6–7–1	Yankee Stadium	62,955
Note: Intra-division opponents are in **bold** text.

=== Game summaries ===
==== Week 14 ====
Team	1	2	3	4	Total
Cardinals	0	0	0	14	14
• Giants	7	7	16	7	37

- Date: December 17
- Location: Yankee Stadium

=== Standings ===
NFL Century
	W	L	T	PCT	DIV	CONF	PF	PA	STK
Cleveland Browns	9	5	0	.643	5–1	7–3	334	297	L1
New York Giants	7	7	0	.500	5–1	7–3	369	379	W1
St. Louis Cardinals	6	7	1	.462	1–4–1	4–5–1	333	356	L2
Pittsburgh Steelers	4	9	1	.308	0–5–1	1–8–1	281	320	W1

Note: Tie games were not officially counted in the standings until 1972.
