= 1967 New York Giants season =

NFL team season

- Owner: Wellington Mara
- General manager: Raymond J. Walsh
- Head coach: Allie Sherman
- Home stadium: Yankee Stadium

Results
- Record: 7–7
- Division place: 2nd NFL Century
- Playoffs: Did not qualify

The 1967 New York Giants season was the franchise's 43rd season in the National Football League. The Giants improved from 1–12–1 the previous season to 7–7, and finished in second place in the NFL Eastern Conference/Century Division.

== Offseason ==
On August 5, Emlen Tunnell, formerly of the Giants, became the first African-American to be inducted into the Pro Football Hall of Fame.

=== NFL draft ===
1967 New York Giants draft
Round	Pick	Player	Position	College	Notes
4	82	Louis Thompson	Defensive tackle	Alabama	
5	109	Dave Lewis	Punter	Stanford	
8	187	Scott Eaton	Cornerback	Oregon State	
Made roster

=== Notable transactions ===
- March 7, 1967 – The Minnesota Vikings traded quarterback Fran Tarkenton to the New York Giants in exchange for the Giants' first and second round picks in the 1967 NFL draft, first round pick in 1968, and third round pick in 1969.

=== Undrafted free agents ===
1967 undrafted free agents of note
Player	Position	College
Jack Calcaterra	Guard	Purdue
Lynn Hughes	Safety	Georgia

== Roster ==
New York Giants 1967 final roster
Quarterbacks: 11 Earl Morrall P; 10 Fran Tarkenton; Running backs: 23 Ernie Koy P; 27 Randy Minniear; 38 Bill Triplett; Wide receivers: 45 Homer Jones; 40 Joe Morrison; 85 Del Shofner; Tight ends: 89 Bobby Crespino; 88 Aaron Thomas	Offensive linemen: 63 Bookie Bolin G; 65 Pete Case G; 62 Darrell Dess G; 64 Andy Gross G; 61 Charlie Harper T; 56 Chuck Hinton C; 53 Greg Larson C; 78 Francis Peay T; 69 Willie Young T; Defensive linemen: 79 Bruce Anderson DE; 73 Roger Anderson DT; 72 Jim Colvin DT; 70 Glen Condren DE; 77 Rosey Davis DE; 75 Jim Katcavage DE; 71 Bob Lurtsema DT; 83 Randy Staten DE	Linebackers: 54 Ken Avery OLB; 58 Mike Ciccolella MLB; 57 Vince Costello MLB; 52 Bill Swain OLB; 51 Ed Weisacosky OLB; Defensive backs: 48 Clarence Childs CB; 20 Scott Eaton CB; 26 Wendell Harris SS/FS; 43 Carl Lockhart FS; 22 Bobby Post CB; 81 Freeman White SS; 41 Willie Williams CB	Special teams: 3 Pete Gogolak K; Taxi squad: -- Jack Calcaterra G; 23 Allen Jacobs RB; 18 Tom Kennedy QB; 86 Rich Kotite TE; 84 Les Murdock K; -- Pete Pifer RB; -- Bobby Post QB; -- Doug Van Horn G; Reserve list: 28 Henry Carr CB (IR); 76 Don Davis DT (IR); 24 Tucker Frederickson RB (IR); 46 Dave Hathcock S (IR); 74 James Moran DT (IR); -- Jeff Smith LB (IR); 25 Larry Vargo LB (IR)

== Regular season ==
=== Schedule ===
Week	Date	Opponent	Result	Record	Venue	Attendance	Recap
1	September 17	at **St. Louis Cardinals**	**W** 37–20	1–0	Busch Memorial Stadium	40,801	Recap
2	September 24	at Dallas Cowboys	**L** 24–38	1–1	Cotton Bowl	66,209	Recap
3	October 1	at Washington Redskins	**L** 34–38	1–2	D.C. Stadium	50,266	Recap
4	October 8	New Orleans Saints	**W** 27–21	2–2	Yankee Stadium	62,670	Recap
5	October 15	at **Pittsburgh Steelers**	**W** 27–24	3–2	Pitt Stadium	39,782	Recap
6	October 22	Green Bay Packers	**L** 21–48	3–3	Yankee Stadium	62,585	Recap
7	October 29	**Cleveland Browns**	**W** 38–34	4–3	Yankee Stadium	62,903	Recap
8	November 5	at Minnesota Vikings	**L** 24–27	4–4	Metropolitan Stadium	44,960	Recap
9	November 12	at Chicago Bears	**L** 7–34	4–5	Wrigley Field	46,223	Recap
10	November 19	**Pittsburgh Steelers**	**W** 28–20	5–5	Yankee Stadium	62,982	Recap
11	November 26	Philadelphia Eagles	**W** 44–7	6–5	Yankee Stadium	63,027	Recap
12	December 3	at **Cleveland Browns**	**L** 14–24	6–6	Cleveland Municipal Stadium	78,594	Recap
13	December 10	Detroit Lions	**L** 7–30	6–7	Yankee Stadium	63,011	Recap
14	December 17	**St. Louis Cardinals**	**W** 37–14	7–7	Yankee Stadium	62,955	Recap
Note: Intra-division opponents are in **bold** text.

=== Game summaries ===
==== Week 11 vs Eagles ====
Week Eleven: Philadelphia Eagles (5–5) at New York Giants (5–5)

Quarter	1	2	3	4	Total
Eagles	0	7	0	0	**7**
**Giants**	17	17	3	7	**44**

at Yankee Stadium, Bronx, New York

- Date: November 26, 1967
- Game weather: 48 °F (9 °C)
- Game attendance: 63,027
- TV announcers (CBS): Stu Nahan, Tom Brookshier (Phil)/ Jack Whitaker, Frank Gifford (NYG)
- Box Score

Team	Category	Player	Statistics
Eagles	Passing	Norm Snead	17/38, 156 Yds, 3 INT
Eagles	Rushing	Timmy Brown	9 Rush, 23 Yds
Eagles	Receiving	Tom Woodeshick	3 Rec, 57 Yds
Giants	Passing	Fran Tarkenton	20/31, 261 Yds, 3 TD
Giants	Rushing	Ernie Koy	11 Rush, 77 Yds
Giants	Receiving	Homer Jones	4 Rec, 84 Yds, 2 TD

Scoring summary

Quarter	Time	Drive			Team	Scoring information	Score	
Quarter	Time	Plays	Yards	TOP	Team	Scoring information	PHI	NYG
1					Giants	Homer Jones 2-yard touchdown reception from Fran Tarkenton, Pete Gogolak kick good	0	7
1					Giants	17-yard field goal by Pete Gogolak	0	10
1					Giants	Homer Jones 63-yard touchdown reception from Fran Tarkenton, Pete Gogolak kick good	0	17
2					Giants	Joe Morrison 2-yard touchdown run, Pete Gogolak kick good	0	24
2					Eagles	Timmy Brown 13-yard touchdown run, Sam Baker kick good	7	24
2					Giants	Aaron Thomas 30-yard touchdown reception from Fran Tarkenton, Pete Gogolak kick good	7	31
2					Giants	15-yard field goal by Pete Gogolak	7	34
3					Giants	40-yard field goal by Pete Gogolak	7	37
4					Giants	Joe Morrison 18-yard touchdown reception from Earl Morrall, Pete Gogolak kick good	7	44
"TOP" = time of possession. For other American football terms, see Glossary of American football.							7	44

==== Week 14 ====
Team	1	2	3	4	Total
Cardinals	0	0	0	14	14
• Giants	7	7	16	7	37

- Date: December 17
- Location: Yankee Stadium

=== Standings ===
NFL Century
	W	L	T	PCT	DIV	CONF	PF	PA	STK
Cleveland Browns	9	5	0	.643	5–1	7–3	334	297	L1
New York Giants	7	7	0	.500	5–1	7–3	369	379	W1
St. Louis Cardinals	6	7	1	.462	1–4–1	4–5–1	333	356	L2
Pittsburgh Steelers	4	9	1	.308	0–5–1	1–8–1	281	320	W1

Note: Tie games were not officially counted in the standings until 1972.

== Awards and honors ==
- Homer Jones, Franchise Record, Most Receiving Yards in One Season, 1,209 Yards

== See also ==
- List of New York Giants seasons
