= 1967 Baltimore Colts season =

15th season of the team in the National Football League

- Owner: Carroll Rosenbloom
- General manager: Harry Hulmes
- Head coach: Don Shula
- Home stadium: Memorial Stadium

Results
- Record: 11–1–2
- Division place: 2nd Coastal
- Playoffs: Did not qualify

The 1967 Baltimore Colts season was the fifteenth season for the team in the National Football League. They finished the regular season with a record of 11 wins, 1 loss, and 2 ties, the same record in the Western Conference's Coastal division with the Los Angeles Rams, who defeated them in the regular season finale; the two had tied in mid-October. The Colts lost the new tiebreaker (point differential in head-to-head games) and thus did not make the playoffs, which included only the four division winners.

The Colts' official winning percentage of .917 (based on the NFL's non-counting of ties for such purposes prior to 1972) is the best in North American professional sports history for a non-playoff-qualifying team. It is also remarkable that the Colts entered the final game undefeated and yet did not qualify for the playoffs.

== Offseason ==
=== NFL draft ===
1967 Baltimore Colts draft
Round	Pick	Player	Position	College	Notes
1	1	Bubba Smith *	Defensive end	Michigan State	from New Orleans
1	20	Jim Detwiler	Running back	Michigan	
2	42	Rick Volk *	Safety	Michigan	
3	54	Norman Davis	Guard	Grambling	
3	71	Leon Ward	Linebacker	Oklahoma State	
4	100	Charlie Stukes	Cornerback	Maryland Eastern Shore	
5	126	Ron Porter	Linebacker	Idaho	
Made roster * Made at least one Pro Bowl during career

=== Undrafted free agents ===
1967 undrafted free agents of note
Player	Position	College
Ross Gwinn	Guard	Northwestern State

== Personnel ==
=== Staff/coaches ===
1967 Baltimore Colts staff
Front office: Owner/president and treasurer – Carroll Rosenbloom; General manager – Harry Hulmes; Coaching staff: Head coach – Don Shula; Offensive coaches: Receivers/offensive ends – Dick Bielski; Offensive backs – Don McCafferty; Offensive line coach – John Sandusky	Defensive coaches: Defensive coordinator/defensive line - Bill Arnsparger; Defensive backfield – Chuck Noll; Linebackers coach – Don Shula

=== Roster ===
1967 Baltimore Colts roster
Quarterbacks (QB): 19 Johnny Unitas; 16 Jim Ward; Running backs (RB): 33 Tony Lorick; 45 Jerry Hill; 41 Tom Matte; 24 Lenny Moore; 26 Preston Pearson; Wide receivers (WR): 82 Raymond Berry; 25 Alex Hawkins; 28 Jimmy Orr; 27 Ray Perkins; 87 Willie Richardson; Tight ends (TE): 88 John Mackey; 86 Butch Wilson	Offensive linemen (OL): 73 Sam Ball T; 63 Norman Davis G; 62 Glenn Ressler G; 71 Dan Sullivan G; 52 Dick Szymanski C; 72 Bob Vogel T; Defensive linemen (DL): 81 Ordell Braase DE; 85 Roy Hilton DE; 79 Lou Michaels DE/K; 76 Fred Miller DT; 74 Billy Ray Smith DT; 78 Bubba Smith DT; 83 Andy Stynchula DE	Linebackers (LB): 36 Barry Brown OLB; 50 Bill Curry MLB; 53 Dennis Gaubatz MLB; 55 Ron Porter OLB; 66 Don Shinnick OLB; Defensive backs (DB): 40 Bobby Boyd CB; 30 Alvin Haymond CB/S; 20 Jerry Logan SS; 43 Lenny Lyles CB; 47 Charlie Stukes CB; 21 Rick Volk FS; 46 Jim Welch SS; Special teams (ST): 49 David Lee P	Practice squad: 68 Ross Gwinn DT; 61 Cornelius Johnson G; 84 Tom Mitchell TE; 14 Terry Southall QB; -- Jim Todd RB; 23 Bob Wade CB; Reserve: 29 Don Alley WR (IR); 32 Mike Curtis LB (IR); 48 Jim Detwiler RB (IR); 42 George Harold CB (IR); 77 Jim Parker T (IR); Rookies in italics

== Regular season ==
=== Schedule ===
Week	Date	Opponent	Result	Record	Venue	Attendance
1	September 17	**Atlanta Falcons**	**W** 38–31	1–0	Memorial Stadium	56,715
2	September 24	at Philadelphia Eagles	**W** 38–6	2–0	Franklin Field	60,755
3	October 1	**San Francisco 49ers**	**W** 41–7	3–0	Memorial Stadium	60,238
4	October 8	at Chicago Bears	**W** 24–3	4–0	Wrigley Field	47,190
5	October 15	**Los Angeles Rams**	**T** 24–24	4–0–1	Memorial Stadium	60,238
6	October 22	at Minnesota Vikings	**T** 20–20	4–0–2	Metropolitan Stadium	47,693
7	October 29	at Washington Redskins	**W** 17–13	5–0–2	D.C. Stadium	50,574
8	November 5	Green Bay Packers	**W** 13–10	6–0–2	Memorial Stadium	60,238
9	November 12	at **Atlanta Falcons**	**W** 49–7	7–0–2	Atlanta Stadium	58,850
10	November 19	Detroit Lions	**W** 41–7	8–0–2	Memorial Stadium	60,238
11	November 26	at **San Francisco 49ers**	**W** 26–9	9–0–2	Kezar Stadium	44,815
12	December 3	Dallas Cowboys	**W** 23–17	10–0–2	Memorial Stadium	60,238
13	December 10	New Orleans Saints	**W** 30–10	11–0–2	Memorial Stadium	60,238
14	December 17	at **Los Angeles Rams**	**L** 10–34	11–1–2	Los Angeles Memorial Coliseum	77,277
Note: Intra-division opponents are in **bold** text.

=== Game summaries ===
==== Week 14 ====
Team	1	2	3	4	Total
Colts	7	0	0	3	10
• Rams	3	14	3	14	34

- Date: December 17
- Location: Los Angeles Memorial Coliseum
- Game attendance: 77,277

=== Standings ===
NFL Coastal
	W	L	T	PCT	DIV	CONF	PF	PA	STK
Los Angeles Rams	11	1	2	.917	4–1–1	8–1–1	398	196	W8
Baltimore Colts	11	1	2	.917	4–1–1	7–1–2	394	198	L1
San Francisco 49ers	7	7	0	.500	3–3	4–6	273	337	W2
Atlanta Falcons	1	12	1	.077	0–6	1–9	175	422	L7

Note: Tie games were not officially counted in the standings until 1972.

== Awards and honors ==
- Johnny Unitas, Bert Bell Award

== See also ==
- History of the Indianapolis Colts
- Indianapolis Colts seasons
