= Scott Eaton (American football) =

American football player (1944–2021)

No. 20
- Position: Defensive back

Personal information
- Born: August 20, 1944; Salem, Oregon, U.S.
- Died: October 1, 2021 (aged 77); Bellevue, Washington, U.S.
- Listed height: 6 ft 3 in (1.91 m)
- Listed weight: 205 lb (93 kg)

Career information
- High school: Medford (Medford, Oregon)
- College: Oregon State
- NFL draft: 1967: 8th round, 187th overall pick

Career history
- New York Giants (1967–1971)

Career NFL statistics
- Games played: 60
- Interceptions: 11
- INT yards: 58
- Touchdowns: 1
- Stats at Pro Football Reference

Thomas Scott Eaton (August 20, 1944 – October 1, 2021) was an American professional football player who was a defensive back in the National Football League (NFL). He was selected by the New York Giants in the eighth round of the 1967 NFL/AFL draft. He played college football for the Oregon State Beavers.

Eaton's son, Tracey, played six years in the NFL.
