= Phil Clark (American football) =

American football player (born 1945)

No. 37, 39, 22
- Position: Defensive back

Personal information
- Born: April 28, 1945 (age 81); Burlington, Kentucky, U.S.
- Listed height: 6 ft 3 in (1.91 m)
- Listed weight: 208 lb (94 kg)

Career information
- High school: Taylor (OH)
- College: Northwestern
- NFL draft: 1967: 3rd round, 76th overall pick

Career history
- Dallas Cowboys (1967–1969); Chicago Bears (1970); New England Patriots (1971)

Awards and highlights
- Second-team All-American (1966); First-team All-Big Ten (1966)

Career NFL statistics
- Games played: 52
- Interceptions: 4
- Fumbles recovered: 2
- Stats at Pro Football Reference

Phil Clark (born April 28, 1945) is an American former professional football player who was a defensive back in the National Football League (NFL) for the Dallas Cowboys, Chicago Bears and New England Patriots. He played college football for the Northwestern Wildcats. He was selected by the Cowboys in the third round of the 1967 NFL/AFL draft.

== Early life ==
Clark attended Taylor High School, before accepting a football scholarship from Northwestern University. He was considered the fastest man on the team and played roving linebacker as a junior.

In 1966, he was named the starter at safety, intercepting 3 passes while receiving second-team All-American and All-Big Ten honors. He also played in the East–West Shrine Game, the Hula Bowl and the 1967 Chicago College All-Star Game.

== Professional career ==
=== Dallas Cowboys ===
The Dallas Cowboys entered the 1967 NFL/AFL draft without a first and second round draft choice, that were traded as part of the price to resolve the Ralph Neely dispute with the Houston Oilers. With their first choice, Clark was selected in the third round (76th overall).

As a rookie, he started 6 games at free safety in place of an injured Mel Renfro. The next year he was a reserve player behind Mike Johnson and Renfro.

In 1969, he started in 13 games at right cornerback, before being benched in favor of Otto Brown. On January 27, 1970, he was traded along with Craig Baynham to the Chicago Bears in exchange for a second round draft choice (#27-Bob Asher).

=== Chicago Bears ===
In 1970, the Chicago Bears switched him to strong safety, where he earned the starter position. He was released on September 9, 1971.

=== New England Patriots ===
On September 22, 1971, he signed as a free agent with the New England Patriots. He was released on October 7, after playing in just two games.
