= Jim Brown: All-American =

2002 American documentary film

- DVD cover
- Directed by: Spike Lee
- Produced by: Spike Lee
- Starring: Jim Brown
- Music by: Terence Blanchard
- Distributed by: Home Box Office
- Release date: March 22, 2002
- Running time: 140 minutes
- Country: United States
- Language: English

Jim Brown: All-American is a 2002 documentary film directed by Spike Lee.

The film takes a look at the life of NFL Hall-of-Famer Jim Brown. The film delves into his life—past, present and future—focusing on his athletic career, acting and activism. Many people from Hollywood and sports backgrounds were interviewed for the film. Members of Brown's family were also interviewed for the film.

== Notable appearances ==
- Art Modell
- Oliver Stone
- Stuart Scott
- Bernie Casey
- Hank Aaron
- Bill Russell
- James Toback
- Fred Williamson
- Raquel Welch
- Melvin Van Peebles
- Johnnie L. Cochran Jr.
- Michael Wilbon
- Joe Frazier
- Burt Reynolds
