= Harold Deters =

American football player (born 1944)

No. 83
- Position: Placekicker

Personal information
- Born: January 16, 1944 (age 82); Du Bois, Pennsylvania, U.S.
- Listed height: 6 ft 0 in (1.83 m)
- Listed weight: 200 lb (91 kg)

Career information
- High school: Grainger (NC)
- College: NC State
- NFL draft: 1967: 12th round, 312th overall pick

Career history
- Dallas Cowboys (1967)

Career NFL statistics
- Games played: 3
- Stats at Pro Football Reference

Harold Lee Deters (born January 16, 1944) is an American former professional football player who was a placekicker for the Dallas Cowboys of the National Football League (NFL). He played college football for the NC State Wolfpack.

== Early life ==
Deters attended Grainger High School. He accepted a football scholarship from North Carolina State University. As a senior, he made 10 out of 21 field goals.

He set 5 Atlantic Coast Conference field goal records, finishing his college career with 21 out of 42 field goals made and didn't miss any extra point attempt.

== Professional career ==
Deters was selected by the Dallas Cowboys in the twelfth round (312th overall) of the 1967 NFL/AFL draft. He began the season as the starter at placekicker, but made only one out of four field goals and was placed on the taxi squad after the third game against the Los Angeles Rams on November 15. He retired at the end of the season to become a teacher.
