= Ted Wheeler (American football) =

American football player (born 1945)

No. 54, 69
- Position: Guard

Personal information
- Born: September 16, 1945 (age 81); Detroit, Michigan, U.S.
- Listed height: 6 ft 3 in (1.91 m)
- Listed weight: 245 lb (111 kg)

Career information
- High school: Pershing
- College: West Texas A&M
- NFL draft: 1967: 9th round, 227th overall pick

Career history
- St. Louis Cardinals (1967–1968); Chicago Bears (1969–1970); British Columbia Lions (1971–1973); Detroit Wheels (1974)
- Stats at Pro Football Reference

Theodore I. Wheeler III (born September 16, 1945) is an American former professional football player who was a guard for the St. Louis Cardinals and the Chicago Bears of the National Football League (NFL). He played college football for the West Texas A&M University
