= Earl Denny =

American football player (born 1945)

No. 28
- Position: Running back

Personal information
- Born: July 21, 1945 (age 81); El Paso, Texas, U.S.
- Listed height: 6 ft 1 in (1.85 m)
- Listed weight: 205 lb (93 kg)

Career information
- High school: Golden City (Golden City, Missouri)
- College: Missouri (1963–1966)
- NFL draft: 1967: 3rd round, 61st overall pick

Career history
- Minnesota Vikings (1967–1969); Washington Redskins (1970)*
- * Offseason or practice squad member only

Career NFL statistics
- Rushing yards: 9
- Rushing average: 4.5
- Return yards: 37
- Stats at Pro Football Reference

Earl Livingston Denny (born July 21, 1945) is an American former professional football player who was a running back for two seasons with the Minnesota Vikings of the National Football League (NFL). He played college football for the Missouri Tigers and was selected by the Vikings in the third round of the 1967 NFL/AFL draft.

== Early life ==
Earl Livingston Denny was born on July 21, 1945, in El Paso, Texas. He attended Golden City High School in Golden City, Missouri.

== College career ==
Denny was a member of the Tigers of the University of Missouri from 1963 to 1966. He rushed 80 times for 297 yards in 1964 while catching ten passes for 222 yards and one touchdown. In 1965, he recorded 36 carries for 109 yards, and ten receptions for 152 yards and two touchdowns. As a senior in 1966, Denny totaled 15 rushing attempts for 20 yards and one touchdown, and 11 catches for 276 yards and one touchdown. He also participated in track for the Tigers.

== Professional career ==
Denny was selected by the Minnesota Vikings in the third round, with the 61st overall pick, of the 1967 NFL draft. He played in 13 games for the Vikings in 1967, recovering two fumbles and returning one kick for 18 yards. He appeared in all 14 games during the 1968 season, totaling two rushes for nine yards, and three kick returns for 19 yards. Denny also played in one playoff game that year, returning one kick for 30 yards. He was placed on injured reserve in 1969 and spent the entire season there.

Denny signed with the Washington Redskins in 1970 but was released later that year.

== Post-playing career ==
Denny was a high school sports coach for six years. He was inducted into the Missouri Sports Hall of Fame in 2008.
