= Norman Davis (American football) =

American football player (1945–2002)

No. 63, 64, 75
- Position: Guard

Personal information
- Born: August 8, 1945; Cocoa, Florida, U.S.
- Died: February 16, 2002 (aged 56)
- Listed height: 6 ft 2 in (1.88 m)
- Listed weight: 245 lb (111 kg)

Career information
- High school: Monroe (Cocoa)
- College: Grambling State (1963-1966)
- NFL draft: 1967: 3rd round, 54th overall pick

Career history
- Baltimore Colts (1967); New Orleans Saints (1969); Philadelphia Eagles (1970); Detroit Wheels (1974); Houston Texans-Shreveport Steamer (1974)

Career NFL statistics
- Games played: 40
- Stats at Pro Football Reference

Norman Davis (August 8, 1945 – February 16, 2002) was an American professional football guard in the National Football League (NFL). He played college football for the Grambling State Tigers. Davis was selected by the Baltimore Colts in the third round (54th overall selection) of the 1967 NFL draft. He played one season each for the Baltimore Colts (1967), New Orleans Saints (1969), and Philadelphia Eagles (1970).
