= Jim Flanigan Sr. =

American football player (1945–2025)

Jim Flanigan
No. 55
- Position: Linebacker

Personal information
- Born: April 15, 1945; Pittsburgh, Pennsylvania, U.S.
- Died: December 26, 2025 (aged 80); Iron River, Michigan, U.S.
- Listed height: 6 ft 3 in (1.91 m)
- Listed weight: 240 lb (109 kg)

Career information
- High school: West Mifflin North (West Mifflin, Pennsylvania)
- College: Pittsburgh
- NFL draft: 1967: 2nd round, 51st overall pick

Career history
- Green Bay Packers (1967–1970); New Orleans Saints (1971)

Awards and highlights
- NFL champion (1967); Super Bowl champion (II)

Career NFL statistics
- Games played: 54
- Interceptions: 1
- Fumble recoveries: 2
- Stats at Pro Football Reference

James Michael Flanigan Sr. (April 15, 1945 – December 26, 2025) was an American professional football player who was a linebacker in the National Football League (NFL). He played college football for the Pittsburgh Panthers.

== College career ==
Flanigan attended the University of Pittsburgh and played linebacker for the Panthers. He was 6' 3" feet tall and weighed 240 pounds.

== Professional career ==
Flanigan was selected by the Green Bay Packers in the 2nd round (51st overall) of the 1967 NFL/AFL draft. He played 40 games for the Packers between 1967 and 1970. He was a member of the Super Bowl Champions of 1967. He also played at middle linebacker in 14 games for the New Orleans Saints in 1971, giving him a total of 54 professional games.

== Personal life and death ==
Flanigan died in Iron River, Michigan, on December 26, 2025, at the age of 80.

His son James Michael Flanigan II played at the University of Notre Dame and professionally for the Chicago Bears, the Green Bay Packers, the San Francisco 49ers, and the Philadelphia Eagles during his nine-year career. His grandson James Michael Flanigan III has played for the Notre Dame Fighting Irish since making his freshman debut on September 27, 2025.
