= 1967 Los Angeles Rams season =

NFL team season

- Head coach: George Allen
- Home stadium: Los Angeles Memorial Coliseum

Results
- Record: 11–1–2
- Division place: 1st Western Coastal
- Playoffs: Lost Western Conference Championship Game (at Packers) 7–28; Won NFL Playoff Bowl (vs. Browns) 30–6

The 1967 Los Angeles Rams season was the team's 30th year with the National Football League and the 22nd season in Los Angeles. Under second-year head coach George Allen, the Rams had a regular season record of 11–1–2, tied for the best in the league (and the best of the George Allen era), and won the first Coastal Division title. It was their first playoff appearance since 1955.

== Roster ==
1967 Los Angeles Rams roster
Quarterbacks (QB): 18 Roman Gabriel; 19 Bill Munson; Running backs (RB): 22 Dick Bass; 33 Willie Ellison; 34 Les Josephson; 20 Tommy Mason; Wide receivers (WR): 30 Bernie Casey; 80 Bucky Pope; 84 Jack Snow; Tight ends (TE): 83 Dave Pivec; 87 Billy Truax	Offensive linemen (OL): 51 George Burman C; 63 Joe Carollo T; 62 Don Chuy G; 73 Charley Cowan T; 50 Ken Iman C; 65 Tom Mack G; 77 Bob Nichols T; 71 Joe Scibelli G; Defensive linemen (DL): 78 Roger Brown DT; 70 Dave Cahill DT; 75 Deacon Jones DE; 85 Lamar Lundy DE; 74 Merlin Olsen DT; 72 Diron Talbert DT	Linebackers (LB): 55 Maxie Baughan OLB; 53 Gene Breen OLB; 88 Tony Guillory OLB; 32 Jack Pardee OLB; 66 Myron Pottios MLB; 57 Doug Woodlief MLB; Defensive backs (DB): 49 Claude Crabb SS; 27 Irv Cross CB; 46 Willie Daniel CB; 44 Chuck Lamson SS; 21 Eddie Meador FS; 24 Clancy Williams CB; 47 Kelton Winston FS; Special teams (ST): 30 Bruce Gossett K; 13 Jon Kilgore P	Practice squad: -- Ron Berger DE; 37 Vilnis Ezerins RB; 14 Wendell Tucker WR; -- Herschel Turner T; Reserve: -- Hal Bedsole TE (IR); 35 Henry Dyer RB (IR); 76 Rosey Grier DT (IR); 31 Jeff Jordan RB (IR); 81 Gregg Schumacher DE (IR); Rookies in italics

== Regular season ==
The Los Angeles Rams entered the 1967 season with renewed optimism. For years they had been a poor team, but the hiring of coach George Allen helped turn things around. In his first season in 1966, the Rams finished at 8–6, their first winning season since 1958.

The Rams won their first two games and faced a big test in Dallas on October 1 against the powerful Cowboys, the defending Eastern Conference champions. It was no contest at the sold-out Cotton Bowl, as the Rams won 35–13, but they came home and stumbled in a 27–24 loss to the 49ers and fell a game behind the 4–0 Baltimore Colts. Los Angeles went east to Baltimore and played to a 24–24 tie. Remarkably, both teams tied their next game as well; the Rams tied the Washington Redskins while the Colts tied the Minnesota Vikings. Both teams then went on winning streaks, and with two games remaining, the Rams were 9–1–2 and the Colts were 10–0–2.

But before finishing the season against the Colts in L.A. in a possible division title deciding game, the Rams faced the two-time defending champion Green Bay Packers (9–2–1). The Packers had clinched their division and would host its playoff games, so a reporter had asked Green Bay head coach Vince Lombardi if he would be resting his starters in (what for them was) a meaningless game, Lombardi roared, "the Packers have never played a meaningless game and, as long as I am the coach, they never will!" The game was a classic see-saw affair that saw the Packers leading 24–20 with less than a minute to play and the Rams out of time outs. Facing fourth down, the Packers lined up to punt at their own 41, but Tony Guillory blocked the Donny Anderson punt and Claude Crabb returned it to the Packer 5-yard line. On second and goal, quarterback Roman Gabriel hit flanker Bernie Casey in the end zone for a 27–24 Rams victory. Baltimore, meanwhile, defeated the New Orleans Saints 30-10.

In the season finale on December 17, the Rams sacked Baltimore quarterback Johnny Unitas seven times and intercepted two of his passes in a 34–10 win. Both teams finished 11–1–2 and tiebreaker rules at the time dictated that the results of the teams' head-to-head meetings was the tiebreaker. The Rams were awarded the division title based on their 1–0–1 record vs. the Colts, outscoring them in the two games by a combined 58–34.

=== Schedule ===
Week	Date	Opponent	Result	Record	Venue	Attendance
1	September 17	at New Orleans Saints	**W** 27–13	1–0	Tulane Stadium	80,879
2	September 22	Minnesota Vikings	**W** 39–3	2–0	Los Angeles Memorial Coliseum	52,255
3	October 1	at Dallas Cowboys	**W** 35–13	3–0	Cotton Bowl	75,229
4	October 8	**San Francisco 49ers**	**L** 24–27	3–1	Los Angeles Memorial Coliseum	60,424
5	October 15	at **Baltimore Colts**	**T** 24–24	3–1–1	Memorial Stadium	60,238
6	October 22	Washington Redskins	**T** 28–28	3–1–2	Los Angeles Memorial Coliseum	55,381
7	October 29	at Chicago Bears	**W** 28–17	4–1–2	Wrigley Field	46,073
8	November 5	at **San Francisco 49ers**	**W** 17–7	5–1–2	Kezar Stadium	53,194
9	November 12	Philadelphia Eagles	**W** 33–17	6–1–2	Los Angeles Memorial Coliseum	57,628
10	November 19	at **Atlanta Falcons**	**W** 31–3	7–1–2	Atlanta Stadium	56,871
11	November 23	at Detroit Lions	**W** 31–7	8–1–2	Tiger Stadium	54,389
12	December 3	**Atlanta Falcons**	**W** 20–3	9–1–2	Los Angeles Memorial Coliseum	40,395
13	December 9	Green Bay Packers	**W** 27–24	10–1–2	Los Angeles Memorial Coliseum	76,637
14	December 17	**Baltimore Colts**	**W** 34–10	11–1–2	Los Angeles Memorial Coliseum	77,277
Note: Intra-division opponents are in **bold** text.

=== Standings ===
NFL Coastal
	W	L	T	PCT	DIV	CONF	PF	PA	STK
Los Angeles Rams	11	1	2	.917	4–1–1	8–1–1	398	196	W8
Baltimore Colts	11	1	2	.917	4–1–1	7–1–2	394	198	L1
San Francisco 49ers	7	7	0	.500	3–3	4–6	273	337	W2
Atlanta Falcons	1	12	1	.077	0–6	1–9	175	422	L7

Note: Tie games were not officially counted in the standings until 1972.

== Postseason ==
Prior to 1975, the NFL playoff sites were rotated and were not based on regular season record. In 1967, the hosts were the Capitol and Central division winners for the conference championships (first round), and the Western Conference for the championship game. This gave home field advantage to the Central Division winner, the two-time defending NFL champion Green Bay Packers. The following year's playoff hosts were Century, Coastal, and Eastern, respectively, and 1969 was like 1967. With the rotation system it was common for the host team to have an inferior record; it had occurred in four of the previous five NFL championship games (1962, 1964, 1965, 1966).

The Coastal division champion Rams (11–1–2) traveled to Milwaukee to meet the Central champion Packers (9–4–1) for the Western Conference title on Saturday, December 23. It was played at County Stadium (the Packers played several home games per season in Milwaukee through 1994) The two teams had played a classic game just thirteen days earlier in Los Angeles (won by the Rams in the final seconds).

In the playoff game, the Rams jumped out to a 7–0 lead in the unusually balmy 30 °F (−1 °C) weather, but the Packers' postseason experience began to show as they led 14–7 at halftime. The Rams could not get anything going offensively and the Packers went on to a methodical 28–7 win. The following week, the Packers won the famed "Ice Bowl" game against the Dallas Cowboys at Lambeau Field in Green Bay.

After the loss in Milwaukee, Los Angeles played the Cleveland Browns in the third place Playoff Bowl. Held at the Orange Bowl in Miami on January 7, it was won by the Rams 30–6.

Round	Date	Opponent	Result	Record	Venue	Attendance
Conference	December 23	at Green Bay Packers	L 7–28	0–1	Milwaukee County Stadium	49,861
Playoff Bowl	January 7, 1968	Cleveland Browns	W 30–6	1–1	Miami Orange Bowl	37,102
