= Jay Bachman =

American football player (born 1945)

No. 56, 65
- Position: Center

Personal information
- Born: December 8, 1945 (age 80); Hamilton, Ohio, U.S.
- Listed height: 6 ft 3 in (1.91 m)
- Listed weight: 250 lb (113 kg)

Career information
- High school: Ross (OH)
- College: Cincinnati
- NFL draft: 1967: 5th round, 132 (By the Green Bay Packers)th overall pick

Career history
- Green Bay Packers (1967)*; Denver Broncos (1968–1971)
- * Offseason or practice squad member only

Awards and highlights
- Super Bowl champion (II)

Career NFL statistics
- Games played: 45
- Games started: 1
- Stats at Pro Football Reference

Jay Lance Bachman (born December 8, 1945) is an American former professional football player who was a center in the American Football League (AFL) and National Football League (NFL). He graduated from Ross High School and played college football at the University of Cincinnati, and then played professionally in the AFL for the Denver Broncos in 1968 and 1969 seasons and for the Broncos of the NFL in the 1970 and 1971 seasons.
