= Travis Williams (running back) =

American football player (1946–1991)

No. 23, 25
- Position: Running back

Personal information
- Born: January 14, 1946; El Dorado, Arkansas, U.S.
- Died: February 17, 1991 (aged 45); Martinez, California, U.S.
- Listed height: 6 ft 1 in (1.85 m)
- Listed weight: 210 lb (95 kg)

Career information
- High school: Harry Ells (Richmond, California)
- College: Arizona State
- NFL draft: 1967: 4th round, 93rd overall pick

Career history
- Green Bay Packers (1967–1970); Los Angeles Rams (1971–1972)

Awards and highlights
- Super Bowl champion (II); NFL champion (1967); Green Bay Packers Hall of Fame; NFL records: Single season kick return average 41.1; Kick return touchdowns in a single season (4)

Career NFL statistics
- Rushing yards: 1,166
- Rushing average: 4
- Receptions: 52
- Receiving yards: 598
- Return yards: 3,014
- Total touchdowns: 18
- Stats at Pro Football Reference

Travis Williams (January 14, 1946 – February 17, 1991) was an American professional football player for the Green Bay Packers. Williams attended Harry Ells High School, Contra Costa College and Arizona State University, before being selected in the fourth round of the 1967 NFL/AFL draft at the insistence of Packers' coach Vince Lombardi. He returned four kickoffs for touchdowns in his rookie season in 1967, setting an NFL record. Among the returns were two in one quarter against the Cleveland Browns to set another league record. He also set the record for single-season kickoff return average with 41.06 yards, returning 18 kickoffs for 739 yards, helping the Packers win their second consecutive Super Bowl championship (Super Bowl II).

Williams played four seasons with the Packers and two with the Los Angeles Rams, before a knee injury ended his career prematurely in the 1972 season. He was traded to the Rams along with the Packers' 4th round draft pick in 1971 in exchange for the Rams' 2nd round pick in 1971 (used to select Virgil Robinson) and a 1972 draft pick. Williams finished his career with 4,778 all-purpose yards and 18 touchdowns, 7 of which came on special teams returns. He averaged 16.4 yards per punt return and 27.5 yards per kick return. In his final season, he led the league in yards per kick return, averaging 29.7.

After his playing career was over, Williams worked a series of odd jobs, collecting junk, driving trucks, working as a bouncer and as a security guard. Later in life, he suffered from alcoholism, particularly after his wife died of a drug overdose in 1985. He was often homeless, sometimes sleeping out of his car. In 1988, he was arrested at a demonstration in front of the office of senator Alan Cranston, protesting cuts to public housing projects.

Williams died of heart failure on February 17, 1991, in Martinez, CA near his hometown of Richmond at the age of 45.
