= 1967 Cleveland Browns season =

NFL team season

- General manager: Harold Sauerbrei
- Head coach: Blanton Collier
- Home stadium: Cleveland Stadium

Results
- Record: 9–5
- Division place: 1st NFL Century
- Playoffs: Lost Eastern Conference Championship Game (at Cowboys) 14–52; Lost NFL Playoff Bowl (vs. Rams) 6–30
- Pro Bowlers: Walter Johnson, DT; Paul Wiggin, DE; Dick Schafrath, LT; Ernie Green, FB; Bill Glass, DE; Leroy Kelly, HB; Gene Hickerson, G

The 1967 Cleveland Browns season was the team's 18th season with the National Football League. The Browns were back in the playoffs after a one-year absence. They finished 9–5, the same as in 1966, but this time, it was good enough for them to get in as they won the Century Division championship in the first year of play after the NFL split the Eastern and Western conferences into two divisions each. The division race was not close, as the Browns finished two games ahead of the runner-up New York Giants (7–7), their old arch rival in the 1950s and early 1960s.

Running Back Leroy Kelly went over 1,000 yards rushing for the second straight time, getting 1,205 to go along with 11 touchdowns, while Ernie Green, now out of the shadow of Jim Brown, went over 700 yards for the second year in a row, getting 710. Quarterback Frank Ryan, the architect of the 27–0 1964 NFL title game victory over the Baltimore Colts, was in his last full season as a starter. He had 20 TD passes and 16 interceptions. But Ryan, with his body, especially his shoulder, beat up, gave way to Bill Nelsen early the next year.

The 52–14 playoff loss to Dallas in the Eastern Conference title contest caused Browns head coach Blanton Collier to re-shape his team at other positions as well, as new players were brought in to replace some of the fading stars who had carried the club for years. For instance, this was the last season for Hall of Fame place-kicker Lou Groza, who retired for the second time – this time for good – after making 11 of 23 field-goal tries. Groza, the last member of the original Browns from the team's inception in 1946, would retire after 21 seasons. Groza was replaced the next season by Don Cockroft.

== Offseason ==
=== NFL draft ===
The following were selected in the 1967 NFL/AFL draft.

1967 Cleveland Browns draft
Round	Selection	Player	Position	College	Notes
1	18	Bob Matheson	Linebacker	Duke	
2	46	Larry Conjar	Running Back	Notre Dame	
3	55	Don Cockroft	Kicker	Adams State	
3	72	Eppie Barney	Flanker	Iowa State	
4	83	Carl Ward	Defensive Back	Michigan	
4	98	Joe Taffoni	Tackle	Tennessee-Martin	
6	152	John Demarie	Guard	LSU	
7	177	Bill House	Tackle	Youngstown State	
8	205	Bill Devrow	Defensive Back	Southern Mississippi	
9	230	Cecil Dowdy	Linebacker	Alabama	
10	255	Jim Copeland	Center	Virginia	
11	282	Bill Sabatino	Defensive Tackle	Colorado	
12	308	Charlie Fowler	Guard	Houston	
13	333	Billy Andrews	Linebacker	Southeastern Louisiana	
14	360	Floyd Rogers	Tackle	Clemson	
15	386	Dennis Williamson	Defensive Back	Wisconsin-Whitewater	
16	411	Don Williams	End	Akron	
17	439	Ben Davis	Defensive Back	Defiance	

== Exhibition schedule ==
Week	Date	Opponent	Result	Attendance
1	August 5	vs. Philadelphia Eagles at Canton	L 13–28	17,500
2	August 13	at San Francisco 49ers	L 14–42	27,482
3	August 19	at Los Angeles Rams	L 17–24	36,942
4	August 25	at Atlanta Falcons	L 31–34	52,240
5	September 2	Green Bay Packers	L 21–30	84,236
6	September 10	at Minnesota Vikings	W 42–14	40,012

There was a doubleheader on September 2, 1967 Falcons vs Vikings and Packers vs Browns.

== Regular season ==
=== Schedule ===
Week	Date	Opponent	Result	Record	Attendance
1	September 17	Dallas Cowboys	L 14–21	0–1	81,039
2	September 24	at Detroit Lions	L 14–31	0–2	57,383
3	October 1	at New Orleans Saints	W 42–7	1–2	77,045
4	October 7	Pittsburgh Steelers	W 21–10	2–2	82,949
5	October 15	St. Louis Cardinals	W 20–16	3–2	77,813
6	October 22	Chicago Bears	W 24–0	4–2	83,183
7	October 29	at New York Giants	L 34–38	4–3	62,903
8	November 5	at Pittsburgh Steelers	W 34–14	5–3	47,131
9	November 12	at Green Bay Packers	L 7–55	5–4	50,074
10	November 19	Minnesota Vikings	W 14–10	6–4	68,431
11	November 26	Washington Redskins	W 42–37	7–4	72,798
12	December 3	New York Giants	W 24–14	8–4	78,594
13	December 10	at St. Louis Cardinals	W 20–16	9–4	47,782
14	December 17	at Philadelphia Eagles	L 24–28	9–5	60,658

=== Game summaries ===
==== Week 13 ====
The Browns clinch their first Century Division title with a 20-16 victory at St. Louis. One touchdown comes on an 18-yard interception return by linebacker Jim Houston and the game ends when St. Louis tight end Jackie Smith catches a 41-yard pass and is dragged down at the Cleveland 18 yard line.

==== Week 14 ====
Team	1	2	3	4	Total
Browns	7	3	0	14	24
• Eagles	0	7	7	14	28

- Date: December 17
- Location: Franklin Field

=== Playoffs ===
Round	Date	Opponent	Result	Record	Venue	Attendance	Recap
Eastern Conference	December 24	at Dallas Cowboys	L 14–52	0–1	Cotton Bowl	70,786	Recap
Playoff Bowl	January 7	Los Angeles Rams	L 6–30	0–2	Miami Orange Bowl	37,102	

=== Standings ===
NFL Century
	W	L	T	PCT	DIV	CONF	PF	PA	STK
Cleveland Browns	9	5	0	.643	5–1	7–3	334	297	L1
New York Giants	7	7	0	.500	5–1	7–3	369	379	W1
St. Louis Cardinals	6	7	1	.462	1–4–1	4–5–1	333	356	L2
Pittsburgh Steelers	4	9	1	.308	0–5–1	1–8–1	281	320	W1

Note: Tie games were not officially counted in the standings until 1972.

== Personnel ==
=== Roster ===
1967 Cleveland Browns roster
Quarterbacks: 13 Frank Ryan; 15 Gary Lane; 18 Dick Shiner; Running backs: 31 Charley Harraway; 35 Larry Conjar; 36 Nick Pietrosante; 44 Leroy Kelly; 48 Ernie Green; Wide receivers: 42 Paul Warfield; 85 Clifton McNeil; 86 Gary Collins P; 87 Eppie Barney; Tight ends: 41 Ralph Smith; 89 Milt Morin	Offensive linemen: 54 Fred Hoaglin C; 55 John Demarie T; 60 John Wooten G; 62 Joe Taffoni G/T; 64 Jim Copeland C/G; 66 Gene Hickerson G; 73 Monte Clark T; 77 Dick Schafrath T; Defensive linemen: 69 Jim Kanicki DT; 71 Walter Johnson DT; 78 Frank Parker DT; 80 Bill Glass DE; 81 Jack Gregory DE; 84 Paul Wiggin DE	Linebackers: 51 Dale Lindsey MLB; 52 Billy Andrews OLB; 56 Bob Matheson MLB; 82 Jim Houston OLB; 83 Johnny Brewer OLB; Defensive backs: 20 Ross Fichtner FS; 24 Ernie Kellermann SS; 27 Carl Ward CB/S; 28 Ben Davis CB; 34 Mike Howell CB; 40 Erich Barnes CB; Special teams: 76 Lou Groza K	Taxi Squad: 12 Don Cockroft K/P; 88 Ron Duncan TE; 43 Ron Green WR; 74 Bill Sabatino DT; rookies in italics

=== Staff/Coaches ===
1967 Cleveland Browns staff
Front office: Majority Owner/CEO & President - Art Modell; Minority owner – Al Lerner; General manager – Harold Sauerbrei; Coaching staff: Head coach – Blanton Collier; Offensive coaches: Quarterbacks/Running Backs - Dub Jones; Offensive guards – Fritz Heisler; Offensive tackles – Ed Ulinski; Offensive backfield and ends – Bob Nussbaumer	Defensive coaches: Defensive line – Nick Skorich; Linebackers – Ed Ulinski; Strength & conditioning: Athletic Trainer - Leo Murphy; Equipment Manager - Morris Kono
