= Craig Baynham =

American football player (born 1944)

No. 46, 48
- Positions: Halfback, Split end

Personal information
- Born: July 24, 1944 (age 82); Casper, Wyoming, U.S.
- Listed height: 6 ft 1 in (1.85 m)
- Listed weight: 203 lb (92 kg)

Career information
- High school: North Augusta (North Augusta, South Carolina)
- College: Georgia Tech (1963-1966)
- NFL draft: 1966: 12th round, 176th overall pick
- AFL draft: 1966: Red Shirt 9th round, 73rd overall pick

Career history
- Dallas Cowboys (1967–1969); Chicago Bears (1970–1971); St. Louis Cardinals (1972)

Career NFL statistics
- Rushing yards: 553
- Rushing average: 3.6
- Receptions: 45
- Receiving yards: 446
- Return yards: 1,035
- Total touchdowns: 9
- Stats at Pro Football Reference

Gordon Craig Baynham (born July 24, 1944) is an American former professional football player who was a running back in the National Football League (NFL) for the Dallas Cowboys, Chicago Bears, and St. Louis Cardinals. He played college football for the Georgia Tech Yellow Jackets and was selected in the 12th round of the 1966 NFL draft.

== Early life ==
Baynham attended North Augusta High School. After playing in only two games as a junior, he had an excellent senior season, that earned him the opportunity to play in the South Carolina All-Star game, where he suffered a knee injury.

As a freshman at Georgia Tech, besides dealing with his knee rehab, he also broke his arm playing against Clemson University. As a sophomore during the fall, he injured the same knee and required surgery.

Baynham enjoyed a healthy season as a junior, playing wingback. He led the team with 30 receptions for 368 yards and set a school record with 7 receiving touchdowns in a season.

He suffered a separated shoulder as a senior, that ended up limiting his playing efficiency. He registered 18 receptions (tied for second on the team) for 144 yards (fourth on the team) and one receiving touchdown (tied for second on the team).

He was a captain of the track team and set a school record with 9.6 seconds in the 100-yard dash.

== Professional career ==
=== Dallas Cowboys ===
Baynham was selected by the Dallas Cowboys in the twelfth round (176th overall) of the 1966 NFL draft and also in the ninth round (73rd overall) of the 1966 AFL Redshirt Draft by the Miami Dolphins of the American Football League. He was selected with a future pick, which allowed the team to draft him before his college eligibility was over. As a rookie in 1967, because of his speed, he was listed as a split end behind Bob Hayes, but also served as a backup at running back. He averaged 27.6 yards on his 12 kickoff returns. He replaced an injured Dan Reeves in the Eastern Conference Championship game against the Cleveland Browns, scoring 3 touchdowns (2 rushing and one receiving).

In 1968, Reeves was the starter at halfback, until week 4 when he tore ligaments in his right knee and was lost for the year. Baynham took over starting 8 games and had his best season in the NFL, registering 438 rushing yards, 29 receptions (third on the team) for 380 yards and 8 touchdowns. He averaged 25.7 yards on his 23 kickoff returns.

In 1969, with Reeves struggling after having off-season knee surgery and Baynham suffering from bruised ribs, it opened the door for rookie Calvin Hill to win the starting halfback job in the second preseason game.

On January 26, 1970, he was traded to the Chicago Bears along with cornerback Phil Clark, in exchange for a second round draft choice (used to draft Bob Asher).

=== Chicago Bears ===
In 1970, he played in 5 games before dislocating a tendon in his ankle. On August 17, 1971, he broke a left wrist in practice that sidelined him for a month. On September 13, Baynham was waived injured after suffering torn ligaments in his right shoulder during a practice.

=== St. Louis Cardinals ===
On May 3, 1972 after a year out of football, the St. Louis Cardinals claimed him on waivers from the Chicago Bears, but would miss half the season with a shoulder injury. On June 9, 1973, he announced his retirement.

== Personal life ==
His son Grant Baynham, also played for Georgia Tech, receiving the Robert Cup, an award given to school's top student athlete.
