= 1967 Washington Redskins season =

NFL team season

- Owner: George Preston Marshall
- General manager: Otto Graham
- President: Edward Bennett Williams
- Head coach: Otto Graham
- Home stadium: D.C. Stadium

Results
- Record: 5–6–3
- Division place: 3rd NFL Capitol
- Playoffs: Did not qualify

The 1967 Washington Redskins season was the franchise's 36th season in the National Football League (NFL) and their 31st in Washington, D.C. The team failed to improve on their 7–7 record from 1966 and finished 5–6–3.

The 1967 season marks the first season in the league's history where the league was divided into two conferences which were subdivided into two divisions. Up to 1967, the league was either divided into two divisions, two conferences, or neither.

== Offseason ==
=== NFL draft ===
1967 Washington Redskins draft
Round	Selection	Player	Position	College
1	13	Ray McDonald	RB	Idaho

== Roster ==
1967 Washington Redskins roster
Quarterbacks (QB): 9 Sonny Jurgensen; 11 Jim Ninowski; Running backs (RB): 24 Pete Larson; 32 Ray McDonald; 25 A. D. Whitfield; 44 Steve Thurlow; Wide receivers (WR): 48 John Burrell; 22 T. J. Jackson; 27 John Love K; 49 Bobby Mitchell; 42 Charley Taylor; Tight ends (TE): 88 Pat Richter P; 87 Jerry Smith	Offensive linemen (OL): 61 Don Bandy G; 56 Len Hauss C; 64 Mitch Johnson T; 75 John Kelly T; 65 Vince Promuto G; 62 Ray Schoenke G; 74 Jim Snowden T; 52 Heath Wingate C; Defensive linemen (DL): 77 Walt Barnes DT; 86 Bill Briggs DE; 66 Carl Kammerer DE; 76 Jim Prestel DT; 72 Joe Rutgens DT; 78 Ron Snidow DE	Linebackers (LB): 63 Ed Breding MLB; 60 Jim Carroll OLB; 55 Chris Hanburger OLB; 54 Larry Hendershot OLB; 70 Sam Huff MLB; 53 Steve Jackson OLB; Defensive backs (DB): 46 Rickie Harris CB/SS; 26 Paul Krause FS; 23 Brig Owens SS; 40 Lonnie Sanders CB; 47 Jim Shorter CB; 43 Tom Walters FS; Special teams (ST): 80 Bruce Alford K	Practice squad: 50 Willie Adams DE; 71 Spain Musgrove DE; 28 Dick Smith CB; -- John Stipech LB; 17 Harry Theofiledes QB; Reserve: 20 Gerry Allen RB (IR); 57 Dave Crossan C (IR); 3 Charlie Gogolak K (IR); -- Dick LeMay DE (Military); 67 Sid Williams LB (IR); Rookies in italics

== Preseason ==
Week	Date	Opponent	Result	Record	Venue	Attendance
1	August 9	Chicago Bears	W 37–14	1–0	D.C. Stadium	47,565
2	August 19	vs. New York Giants	W 31–13	2–0	Carter–Finley Stadium (Raleigh, NC)	33,500
3	August 26	at Boston Patriots (AFL)	W 13–7	3–0	Harvard Stadium (Cambridge, MA)	15,523
4	August 31	Baltimore Colts	L 17–23	3–1	D.C. Stadium	47,008
5	September 9	vs. Pittsburgh Steelers	W 16–10	4–1	Foreman Field (Norfolk, VA)	20,600

== Regular season ==
=== Schedule ===
Week	Date	Opponent	Result	Record	Venue	Attendance	Recap
1	September 17	at **Philadelphia Eagles**	**L** 24–35	0–1	Franklin Field	60,709	Recap
2	September 24	at **New Orleans Saints**	**W** 30–10	1–1	Tulane Stadium	74,937	Recap
3	October 1	New York Giants	**W** 38–34	2–1	D.C. Stadium	50,266	Recap
4	October 8	**Dallas Cowboys**	**L** 14–17	2–2	D.C. Stadium	50,566	Recap
5	October 15	at Atlanta Falcons	**T** 20–20	2–2–1	Atlanta Stadium	56,538	Recap
6	October 22	at Los Angeles Rams	**T** 28–28	2–2–2	Los Angeles Memorial Coliseum	55,381	Recap
7	October 29	Baltimore Colts	**L** 13–17	2–3–2	D.C. Stadium	50,574	Recap
8	November 5	St. Louis Cardinals	**L** 21–27	2–4–2	D.C. Stadium	50,480	Recap
9	November 12	San Francisco 49ers	**W** 31–28	3–4–2	D.C. Stadium	50,326	Recap
10	November 19	at **Dallas Cowboys**	**W** 27–20	4–4–2	Cotton Bowl	75,538	Recap
11	November 26	at Cleveland Browns	**L** 37–42	4–5–2	Cleveland Municipal Stadium	72,798	Recap
12	December 3	**Philadelphia Eagles**	**T** 35–35	4–5–3	D.C. Stadium	50,451	Recap
13	December 10	at Pittsburgh Steelers	**W** 15–10	5–5–3	Pitt Stadium	22,251	Recap
14	December 17	**New Orleans Saints**	**L** 14–30	5–6–3	D.C. Stadium	50,486	Recap
Note: Intra-division opponents are in **bold** text.

=== Game summaries ===
==== Week 13 ====
Team	1	2	3	4	Total
• Redskins	0	9	0	6	15
Steelers	0	3	0	7	10

- Date: December 10
- Location: Pitt Stadium

==== Week 14 ====
Team	1	2	3	4	Total
• Saints	0	7	9	14	30
Redskins	0	0	7	7	14

- Date: December 17
- Location: D.C. Stadium

=== Standings ===
NFL Capitol
	W	L	T	PCT	DIV	CONF	PF	PA	STK
Dallas Cowboys	9	5	0	.643	4–2	8–2	342	268	L1
Philadelphia Eagles	6	7	1	.462	3–2–1	5–4–1	351	409	W1
Washington Redskins	5	6	3	.455	2–3–1	4–5–1	347	353	L1
New Orleans Saints	3	11	0	.214	2–4	2–8	233	379	W1

Note: Tie games were not officially counted in the standings until 1972.
