= Claude Crabb =

American football player (1940–2021)

No. 23, 49
- Position: Cornerback

Personal information
- Born: March 8, 1940; Carmel, California, U.S.
- Died: February 8, 2021 (aged 80); Palm Desert, California, U.S.
- Listed height: 6 ft 1 in (1.85 m)
- Listed weight: 192 lb (87 kg)

Career information
- High school: Monterey (Monterey, California)
- College: USC (1959); Colorado (1960–1961)
- NFL draft: 1962: 19th round, 253rd overall pick
- AFL draft: 1962: 27th round, 212th overall pick

Career history
- Washington Redskins (1962–1963); Philadelphia Eagles (1964–1965); Los Angeles Rams (1966–1968)

Career NFL statistics
- Interceptions: 10
- Fumble recoveries: 5
- Touchdowns: 1
- Stats at Pro Football Reference

Claude Clarence Crabb (March 8, 1940 – February 8, 2021) was an American professional football player who was a cornerback in the National Football League (NFL). He played college football for the USC Trojans.

== Early life ==
Crabb was a football quarterback, basketball player and track sprinter at Monterey Union High School 1954–58.

== College years ==
He played college football at the University of Colorado after transferring from the University of Southern California and was drafted in the 27th round of the 1962 AFL draft by the Buffalo Bills.

== Professional career ==
Crabb was a defensive back in the National Football League for the Washington Redskins (1962–63) where he made six interceptions in 1962, Philadelphia Eagles (1964–65), and the Los Angeles Rams (1966–68). He had been traded along with Norm Snead from the Redskins to the Eagles for Sonny Jurgensen and Jimmy Carr on 31 March 1964. The transaction was part of a youth movement by recently appointed Eagles head coach and general manager Joe Kuharich, as both Snead and Crabb were age 24 at the time while Jurgensen and Carr were 29 and 31 respectively.

== Death ==
Crabb died from COVID-19 on February 8, 2021, aged 80, during the COVID-19 pandemic in California.
