= NFL Century Division =

Former National Football League division

The NFL Century Division was one of the four divisions of the National Football League during the 1967 through 1969 seasons. (The other divisions were named Capitol, Central, Coastal; each name began with C and consisted of seven letters). The NFL, previously, consisted of the Eastern Conference and Western Conference. The four-division setup was used in the preparation of the merger of the NFL and American Football League (AFL) for the 1970 NFL season.

The NFL Century Division had four teams in each season; however, it had five different members: Cleveland Browns, New Orleans Saints, New York Giants, Pittsburgh Steelers, and St. Louis Cardinals. In 1967 and 1969 the four teams were the Browns, Cardinals, Giants, and Steelers. For the 1968 season, the Giants were placed in the Capitol Division, with the Saints switching to the Century.

The Century Division was the only one not based on geography; the Capitol Division's teams were in the eastern U.S., the Central Division in the upper Midwest, and the Coastal had two teams on or near each coast. While the origin of name Century Division is not completely certain, it has been hypothesized that the name could have been intended to be a reference to the centennial of American football, which is generally regarded to have emerged as a distinct game in the late 1860s. In any case, the Century Division's teams varied widely by geography, although not to the extent of the Coastal Division.

The Cleveland Browns won all three division titles in the Century Division. After the AFL–NFL merger in 1970, the division was disbanded; the Giants joined the NFC East; the Cardinals also joined the NFC East before moving to the NFC West in 2002. New Orleans became a member of the NFC West, moving to the newly formed NFC South in 2002. Cleveland and Pittsburgh joined the AFC Central (later the AFC North), with the Cincinnati Bengals (from the AFL West) and Houston Oilers (from the AFL East).

== Division champions ==
Season	Team	Record	Playoff Results
NFL Century
1967	Cleveland Browns	9-5-0	Lost NFL Divisional Playoffs
1968	Cleveland Browns	10-4-0	Lost NFL Championship
1969	Cleveland Browns	10-3-1	Lost NFL Championship

== See also ==
- Browns–Steelers rivalry, the strongest one between any two former Century Division teams.
