= 1967 Philadelphia Eagles season =

NFL team season

- Owner: Jerry Wolman
- Head coach: Joe Kuharich
- Home stadium: Franklin Field

Results
- Record: 6–7–1
- Division place: 2nd NFL Capitol
- Playoffs: Did not qualify
- Pro Bowlers: DT Floyd Peters; C Jim Ringo

The 1967 Philadelphia Eagles season was the franchise's 35th season in the National Football League. The team failed to improve on its previous year win total only winning 6 games.

== Offseason ==
The Eagles held their 1967 training camp for the last time at Hershey Park Stadium in Hershey, Pennsylvania. The following year they trained at Albright College in Reading, Pennsylvania, home of the Albright College Lions.

=== NFL/AFL draft ===
The 1967 NFL/AFL draft was a common draft of college players, held on March 14–15.

=== Player selections ===
The table shows the Eagles selections and what picks they had that were traded away and the team that ended up with that pick. It is possible the Eagles' pick ended up with this team via another team that the Eagles made a trade with. Not shown are acquired picks that the Eagles traded away.

= Pro Bowler	= Hall of Famer

Rd	PICK	PLAYER	POS	SCHOOL
1	19	Harry Jones	Running Back	Arkansas
2	44	John Brooks	Guard	Kent State
3	68	Harry Wilson	Running back	Nebraska
3	73	_{Pick taken by Pittsburgh Steelers}		
4	99	Chuck Hughes	Wide Receiver	Texas Western
5	114	Bob Van Pelt	Center	Indiana
5	125	Dick Absher	Tight End	Maryland
6	153	Bob Hughes	Defensive End	Jackson State
7	174	John Williams	Defensive Back	San Diego State
7	178	Bob Crenshaw	Guard	New Mexico State
8	203	Don Klacking	Running Back	Wyoming
9	231	Harold Stancell	Defensive Back	Tennessee
10	256	Maurice Bates	Defensive End	Northern (SD)
11	281	Omar Parker	Guard	Washington
12	309	Ben Monroe	Quarterback	New Mexico
13	334	Bill Downes	Defensive Tackle	Louisville
14	358	Dick Kenney	Placekicker	Michigan State
15	387	David Poche	Tackle	McNeese
16	412	Lynn Baker	Defensive Back	Colorado
17	437	George Catavolos	Defensive Back	Purdue

== Personnel ==
=== Staff / Coaches ===
1967 Philadelphia Eagles staff
Front office: Principal / Majority Owner – Jerry Wolman; General manager – Joe Kuharich (de facto); Head coaches: Head coach - Joe Kuharich; Offensive coaches: Offensive Coordinator / Receivers - Herman Ball; Offensive Assistant - Mike Nixon; Offensive Line – Dick Stanfel	Defensive coaches: Defensive Coordinator - Dick Evans; Defensive Backs / Secondary – Fred Bruney

=== Roster ===
1967 Philadelphia Eagles roster
Quarterbacks (QB): 10 King Hill; 16 Norm Snead; Running backs (RB): 22 Timmy Brown; 23 Harry Jones; 29 Izzy Lang; 37 Tom Woodeshick; Wide receivers (WR): 85 Gary Ballman; 81 Ron Goodwin; 18 Ben Hawkins; 86 Fred Hill; 13 Chuck Hughes; Tight ends (TE): 98 Mike Ditka; 39 Pete Emelianchik; 84 Jim Kelly	Offensive linemen (OL): 71 Dick Hart G; 79 Lane Howell T; 63 Lynn Hoyem T; 50 Dave Recher C; 54 Jim Ringo C; 70 Jim Skaggs G; 65 Bill Stetz G; 66 Gordon Wright G; Defensive linemen (DL): 80 Randy Beisler DT; 83 Don Hultz DE; 87 Dave Lince; 75 John Meyers DT; 72 Floyd Peters DT; 88 Gary Pettigrew DE; 58 Mel Tom DE; 64 Dean Wink DE	Linebackers (LB): 55 Fred Brown OLB; 51 Ike Kelley MLB; 52 Dave Lloyd MLB; 89 Mike Morgan OLB; 61 Arunas Vasys OLB; 53 Harold Wells OLB; Defensive backs (DB): 28 Jim Gray CB; 42 Aaron Martin CB; 26 Al Nelson CB; 9 Jim Nettles CB; 24 Nate Ramsey SS; 21 Joe Scarpati FS; 25 Bobby Shann FS; 17 Taft Reed CB; Special teams (ST): 38 Sam Baker K/P	Practice squad: 4 Benjy Dial QB; 7 John Huarte QB; Reserve: -- Dan Berry RB (IR); -- Jim Bohl RB (IR); 76 Bob Brown T (IR); -- Bobby Crenshaw T (IR); 78 Dave Graham T (IR); 45 Ron Medved S (IR); 74 Frank Molden DT (IR); -- Tom Sarkisian T (IR); 41 Harry Wilson RB (IR); Rookies in italics

== Regular season ==
=== Schedule ===
Week	Date	Opponent	Result	Record	Venue	Attendance
1	September 17	**Washington Redskins**	**W** 35–24	1–0	Franklin Field	60,709
2	September 24	Baltimore Colts	**L** 6–38	1–1	Franklin Field	60,755
3	October 1	Pittsburgh Steelers	**W** 34–24	2–1	Franklin Field	60,335
4	October 8	at Atlanta Falcons	**W** 38–7	3–1	Atlanta Stadium	53,868
5	October 15	San Francisco 49ers	**L** 27–28	3–2	Franklin Field	60,825
6	October 22	at St. Louis Cardinals	**L** 14–48	3–3	Busch Memorial Stadium	46,562
7	October 29	**Dallas Cowboys**	**W** 21–14	4–3	Franklin Field	60,740
8	November 5	at **New Orleans Saints**	**L** 24–31	4–4	Tulane Stadium	59,596
9	November 12	at Los Angeles Rams	**L** 17–33	4–5	Los Angeles Memorial Coliseum	57,628
10	November 19	**New Orleans Saints**	**W** 48–21	5–5	Franklin Field	60,751
11	November 26	at New York Giants	**L** 7–44	5–6	Yankee Stadium	63,027
12	December 3	at **Washington Redskins**	**T** 35–35	5–6–1	D.C. Stadium	50,451
13	December 10	at **Dallas Cowboys**	**L** 17–38	5–7–1	Cotton Bowl	55,834
14	December 17	Cleveland Browns	**W** 28–24	6–7–1	Franklin Field	60,658
Note: Intra-division opponents are in **bold** text.

=== Game summaries ===
==== Week 11 at Giants ====
Week Eleven: Philadelphia Eagles (5–5) at New York Giants (5–5)

Quarter	1	2	3	4	Total
Eagles	0	7	0	0	**7**
**Giants**	17	17	3	7	**44**

at Yankee Stadium, Bronx, New York

- Date: November 26, 1967
- Game weather: 48 °F (9 °C)
- Game attendance: 63,027
- Box Score

Team	Category	Player	Statistics
Eagles	Passing	Norm Snead	17/38, 156 Yds, 3 INT
Eagles	Rushing	Timmy Brown	9 Rush, 23 Yds
Eagles	Receiving	Tom Woodeshick	3 Rec, 57 Yds
Giants	Passing	Fran Tarkenton	20/31, 261 Yds, 3 TD
Giants	Rushing	Ernie Koy	11 Rush, 77 Yds
Giants	Receiving	Homer Jones	4 Rec, 84 Yds, 2 TD

Scoring summary

Quarter	Time	Drive			Team	Scoring information	Score	
Quarter	Time	Plays	Yards	TOP	Team	Scoring information	PHI	NYG
1					Giants	Homer Jones 2-yard touchdown reception from Fran Tarkenton, Pete Gogolak kick good	0	7
1					Giants	17-yard field goal by Pete Gogolak	0	10
1					Giants	Homer Jones 63-yard touchdown reception from Fran Tarkenton, Pete Gogolak kick good	0	17
2					Giants	Joe Morrison 2-yard touchdown run, Pete Gogolak kick good	0	24
2					Eagles	Timmy Brown 13-yard touchdown run, Sam Baker kick good	7	24
2					Giants	Aaron Thomas 30-yard touchdown reception from Fran Tarkenton, Pete Gogolak kick good	7	31
2					Giants	15-yard field goal by Pete Gogolak	7	34
3					Giants	40-yard field goal by Pete Gogolak	7	37
4					Giants	Joe Morrison 18-yard touchdown reception from Earl Morrall, Pete Gogolak kick good	7	44
"TOP" = time of possession. For other American football terms, see Glossary of American football.							7	44

==== Week 14 ====
Team	1	2	3	4	Total
Browns	7	3	0	14	24
• Eagles	0	7	7	14	28

- Date: December 17
- Location: Franklin Field

=== Standings ===
NFL Capitol
	W	L	T	PCT	DIV	CONF	PF	PA	STK
Dallas Cowboys	9	5	0	.643	4–2	8–2	342	268	L1
Philadelphia Eagles	6	7	1	.462	3–2–1	5–4–1	351	409	W1
Washington Redskins	5	6	3	.455	2–3–1	4–5–1	347	353	L1
New Orleans Saints	3	11	0	.214	2–4	2–8	233	379	W1

Note: Tie games were not officially counted in the standings until 1972.
