= 1967 NFL season =

American football season

Regular season
- Duration: September 17 – December 17, 1967

Playoffs
- East Champions: Dallas Cowboys
- West Champions: Green Bay Packers

Championship Game
- Champions: Green Bay Packers

NFL teams: Coastal, Central, Century, Capitol

The 1967 NFL season was the 48th regular season of the National Football League. The league expanded to 16 teams with the addition of the New Orleans Saints.

The two eight-team divisions became two eight-team conferences split into two divisions each: the newly renamed Eastern Conference divisions were Capitol (Dallas, New Orleans, Philadelphia, and Washington) and Century (Cleveland, New York, Pittsburgh, and St. Louis), and the newly renamed Western Conference divisions were Central (Chicago, Detroit, Green Bay, and Minnesota) and Coastal (Atlanta, Baltimore, Los Angeles, and San Francisco). Each division winner advanced to the playoffs, expanded to four teams in this year. The Saints and the New York Giants agreed to switch divisions in 1968 and return to the 1967 alignment in 1969. This was done to allow all Eastern Conference teams to visit New York at least once over the three-year period. Initially the Capitol Division was called the Federal Division when the NFL decided upon the divisions on November 30, 1966.

The NFL season concluded on December 31, when the Green Bay Packers defeated the Dallas Cowboys in the NFL Championship Game (known as the "Ice Bowl"), in which Jerry Kramer famously blocked for Bart Starr on a quarterback sneak for the game-winning touchdown.

Two weeks later, on January 14, 1968, the Packers handily defeated the AFL's Oakland Raiders 33–14 in Super Bowl II at Miami's Orange Bowl. This was Vince Lombardi's final game as the Packers' head coach. At the time, it was officially the "AFL-NFL World Championship Game," though the more succinct "Super Bowl" was commonly used.

The 1965-67 Packers became the second team in NFL history to three-peat (the first being the same Packers team from 1929-31), and no one has done it since.

The Baltimore Colts had tied for the NFL's best record in 1967 at 11–1–2, but were excluded from the postseason because of new rules introduced for breaking ties within a division. The L.A. Rams won the division title over Baltimore as a result of the Rams' 34–10 win over Baltimore in the last game of the regular season and a 24–24 tie in Baltimore in mid-October. L.A. had a 24-point edge over Baltimore in head-to-head meetings, giving them the tiebreaker and the Coastal division title. The other three division winners had only nine victories each. A total of nine NFL games ended in ties, the most since 1932 – including the two ties in the AFL (considered official NFL records since the merger) makes this the only season since 1932 with ten or more tied games.

Prior to 1975, the playoff sites rotated and were known prior to the start of the season. The hosts in 1967 were the Capitol and Central division winners for the conference championships (first round), and the Western Conference for the championship game. The 1968 playoff hosts were Century, Coastal, and Eastern, respectively, and 1969 featured the same hosts as 1967.

== Draft ==
The 1967 NFL/AFL draft was held from March 14 to 15 at New York City's Gotham Hotel. With the first pick of the first common draft, the Baltimore Colts selected defensive tackle Bubba Smith from Michigan State.

== Expansion draft ==
The 1967 NFL expansion draft was held on February 9, 1967, with the New Orleans Saints selecting 42 players from the other NFL teams; the year-old Atlanta Falcons were exempted from losing a player in this expansion draft.

== Major rule changes ==
- The "slingshot" or "tuning fork" goalpost, with one curved support from the ground and offset behind the crossbar, was made standard in the NFL. This replaced the previous year's offset goalpost, which had two non-curved supports from the ground. Before the introduction of the offset goalpost, the supports were directly on the goal line. Posts also had to be painted bright gold.
  - The new goalposts debuted in the previous season's Playoff Bowl.
- A 6-foot-wide (1.8 m) border around the field was also made standard in the league. Its outer edge designates the closest that non-participants can be to the field, and thus enables the game officials to have a running lane to work in.

== Deaths ==
- April 4 - Guy Chamberlin, age 73. Played Wing Back for the Chicago Bears, Canton Bulldogs, Frankford Yellow Jackets. Played on four NFL Championship teams. Elected to the Pro Football Hall Of Fame in 1965.
- June 22 - Hobby Kinderdine, age 72. Original member of the Dayton Triangles. Played center for Dayton from 1920-1929.

== Division races ==
The Eastern Conference was split into the Capitol and Century Divisions, and the Western Conference had the Coastal and Central Divisions. (Each of the new division names began with the letter C and contained seven letters.) Under the new system, each team played six division games (a home-and-away series against teams in its division); a game against each of the other four teams in its conference; and a nonconference game against all of the four members of one of the two four-team divisions in the other conference, for a total of 14 games. In the past, from 1933 to 1966, if two teams were tied for the division lead at season's end, a one-game playoff was conducted to break the tie. Starting in 1967, a tiebreaking system was implemented that started with net points in head-to-head competition, followed by the team that had less recently played in a title game. As such, only one team in a division would be the division winner, even if the win–loss record was the same.

Week	Capitol		Century		Coastal		Central	
1	Dallas	1–0–0	Pittsburgh	1–0–0	San Francisco	1–0–0	Detroit	0–0–1
2	Dallas	2–0–0	St. Louis	1–1–0	San Francisco	2–0–0	Detroit	1–0–1
3	Philadelphia	2–1–0	St. Louis	2–1–0	Los Angeles	3–0–0	Green Bay	2–0–1
4	Dallas	3–1–0	St. Louis	3–1–0	Baltimore	4–0–0	Green Bay	3–0–1
5	Dallas	4–1–0	New York	3–2–0	Baltimore	4–0–1	Green Bay	3–1–1
6	Dallas	5–1–0	Cleveland	3–2–0	Baltimore	4–0–2	Green Bay	4–1–1
7	Dallas	5–2–0	New York	4–3–0	Baltimore	5–0–2	Green Bay	5–1–1
8	Dallas	6–2–0	St. Louis	5–3–0	Baltimore	6–0–2	Green Bay	5–2–1
9	Dallas	7–2–0	St. Louis	5–3–1	Baltimore	7–0–2	Green Bay	6–2–1
10	Dallas	7–3–0	Cleveland	6–4–0	Baltimore	8–0–2	Green Bay	7–2–1
11	Dallas	8–3–0	Cleveland	7–4–0	Baltimore	9–0–2	Green Bay	8–2–1
12	Dallas	8–4–0	Cleveland	8–4–0	Baltimore	10–0–2	Green Bay	9–2–1
13	Dallas	9–4–0	Cleveland	9–4–0	Baltimore	11–0–2	Green Bay	9–3–1
14	Dallas	9–5–0	Cleveland	9–5–0	Los Angeles	11–1–2	Green Bay	9–4–1

== Final standings ==
Eastern Conference

NFL Capitol
	W	L	T	PCT	DIV	CONF	PF	PA	STK
Dallas Cowboys	9	5	0	.643	4–2	8–2	342	268	L1
Philadelphia Eagles	6	7	1	.462	3–2–1	5–4–1	351	409	W1
Washington Redskins	5	6	3	.455	2–3–1	4–5–1	347	353	L1
New Orleans Saints	3	11	0	.214	2–4	2–8	233	379	W1

NFL Century
	W	L	T	PCT	DIV	CONF	PF	PA	STK
Cleveland Browns	9	5	0	.643	5–1	7–3	334	297	L1
New York Giants	7	7	0	.500	5–1	7–3	369	379	W1
St. Louis Cardinals	6	7	1	.462	1–4–1	4–5–1	333	356	L2
Pittsburgh Steelers	4	9	1	.308	0–5–1	1–8–1	281	320	W1

Note: Tie games were not officially counted in the standings until 1972.

Western Conference

NFL Coastal
	W	L	T	PCT	DIV	CONF	PF	PA	STK
Los Angeles Rams	11	1	2	.917	4–1–1	8–1–1	398	196	W8
Baltimore Colts	11	1	2	.917	4–1–1	7–1–2	394	198	L1
San Francisco 49ers	7	7	0	.500	3–3	4–6	273	337	W2
Atlanta Falcons	1	12	1	.077	0–6	1–9	175	422	L7

NFL Central
	W	L	T	PCT	DIV	CONF	PF	PA	STK
Green Bay Packers	9	4	1	.692	4–1–1	6–3–1	332	209	L2
Chicago Bears	7	6	1	.538	3–2–1	5–4–1	239	218	W1
Detroit Lions	5	7	2	.417	1–3–2	3–5–2	260	259	W2
Minnesota Vikings	3	8	3	.273	1–3–2	1–6–3	233	294	L1

=== Tiebreakers ===
Los Angeles won the Coastal Division based on better point differential in head-to-head games (net 24 points) vs. Baltimore. The Rams and Colts played to a 24–24 tie in Baltimore in October before the Rams won 34–10 on the season's final Sunday at the Los Angeles Memorial Coliseum. The result would be the same under the modern tiebreaker, which relies first on head-to-head record (Los Angeles won the head-to-head series, 1–0–1).

== Postseason ==
=== NFL playoffs ===
Conference championship games
December 24 – Cotton Bowl
Cleveland Browns (9–5)	14
Dallas Cowboys (9–5)	52
December 23 – Milwaukee County Stadium
Los Angeles Rams (11–1–2)	7
Green Bay Packers (9–4–1)	28

NFL Championship Game
* December 31 – Lambeau Field
Dallas Cowboys	17
Green Bay Packers	21

=== Playoff Bowl ===
The Playoff Bowl was between the conference runners-up, for third place in the league. The game, in its eighth year, was played one week after the title game.

- Los Angeles 30, Cleveland 6 at Orange Bowl, Miami, Florida, January 7, 1968

=== AFL–NFL World Championship Game ===
The Green Bay Packers defeated the Oakland Raiders, league champion of the 1967 American Football League season, 33–14, at the Orange Bowl in Miami on January 14, 1968.

== Awards ==
Most Valuable Player	Johnny Unitas, quarterback, Baltimore Colts
Coach of the Year	George Allen, L.A. Rams; Don Shula, Baltimore Colts (tie)
Offensive Rookie of the Year	Mel Farr, running back, Detroit
Defensive Rookie of the Year	Lem Barney, cornerback, Detroit

== Coaching changes ==
- Detroit Lions: Harry Gilmer was replaced by Joe Schmidt.
- Minnesota Vikings: Norm Van Brocklin was replaced by Bud Grant.
- New Orleans Saints: Tom Fears became the expansion team's first head coach.

== Stadium changes ==
- The expansion New Orleans Saints began play at Tulane Stadium

== See also ==
- 1967 American Football League season
