= 1970 Chicago Bears season =

NFL team season

- Owner: George Halas
- Head coach: Jim Dooley
- Home stadium: Wrigley Field

Results
- Record: 6–8
- Division place: 4th NFC Central
- Playoffs: Did not qualify

The 1970 Chicago Bears season was their 51st regular season completed in the National Football League. The team finished with a 6–8 record, a significant improvement over the 1–13 record of the previous season, the worst in franchise history.

After losing the coin flip for the number one pick in the 1970 NFL draft (which Pittsburgh used to select quarterback Terry Bradshaw), the Bears traded the second pick to the Green Bay Packers for linebacker Lee Roy Caffey, running back Elijah Pitts, and center Bob Hyland.

This was Chicago's final season at Wrigley Field. They moved into Soldier Field beginning the next season, and would play there until the 2002 season.

== Offseason ==
- June 16, 1970 – After a seven-month battle with cancer, running back Brian Piccolo died at age 26.

=== NFL draft ===
1970 Chicago Bears draft
Round	Pick	Player	Position	College	Notes
3	58	George Farmer	Wide receiver	UCLA	
4	79	Lynn Larson	Tackle	Kansas State	
4	100	Ross Brupbacher	Linebacker	Texas A&M	
6	133	Bob Cutburth	Quarterback	Oklahoma State	
6	139	Jeff Curchin	Tackle	Florida State	
8	183	Dana Stephenson	Defensive back	Nebraska	
9	210	Linzy Cole	Wide receiver	TCU	
10	235	Glen Holloway	Guard	North Texas State	
11	262	Ted Rose	Tight end	Northern Michigan	
12	287	Butch Davis	Defensive back	Missouri	
13	314	Jimmy Gunn	Defensive back	USC	
14	339	Jim Morgan	Wide receiver	Henderson State	
15	366	Phil Abraira	Defensive back	Florida State	
16	391	Robert Helterbran	Guard	North Texas State	
17	418	Joe Brunson	Defensive tackle	Furman	
Made roster

=== Undrafted free agents ===
1970 undrafted free agents of note
Player	Position	College
Frank Grimm	Guard	Tulsa
Dick Hill	Wide receiver	UT Arlington
Gary Kerr	Wide receiver	Cal Poly

== Roster ==
1970 Chicago Bears roster
Quarterbacks (QB): 11 Jack Concannon; 16 Kent Nix; Running backs (RB): 46 Craig Baynham; 29 Ronnie Bull; 33 Mike Hull; 22 Ross Montgomery; 24 Don Shy; Wide receivers (WR): 25 Linzy Cole; 43 George Farmer; 45 Dick Gordon; 84 Jim Seymour; 21 Cecil Turner; Tight ends (TE): 37 Rich Coady; 38 Ray Ogden	Offensive linemen (OL): 72 Jim Cadile G; 70 Jeff Curchin T; 61 Glen Holloway G; 50 Bob Hyland C; 65 Randy Jackson T; 74 Wayne Mass T; 68 Howard Mudd G; 69 Ted Wheeler G; Defensive linemen (DL): 78 Harry Gunner DE; 75 Dave Hale DT; 85 Willie Holman DE; 87 Ed O'Bradovich DE; 67 George Seals DT; 76 Bill Staley DT	Linebackers (LB): 31 Ross Brupbacher OLB; 55 Doug Buffone OLB; 51 Dick Butkus MLB; 60 Lee Roy Caffey OLB; 30 Jimmy Gunn OLB; 63 John Neidert MLB; Defensive backs (DB): 29 Phil Clark SS; 23 Dick Daniels FS; 47 Butch Davis CB; 44 Garry Lyle FS; 26 Bennie McRae CB; 27 Terrell Ray CB; 48 Ron Smith CB/S; 20 Joe Taylor CB; Special teams (ST): 88 Bobby Joe Green P; 83 Mac Percival K	Reserve: 12 Bobby Cutburth QB (Military); 10 Bobby Douglass QB (IR); 86 Jim Hester TE (IR); 32 Ralph Kurek RB (IR); 40 Gale Sayers RB (IR); 89 Bob Wallace TE (IR); Rookies in italics

== Regular season ==
As an experiment, the Bears hosted their first home game of the season at Northwestern University's Dyche Stadium in Evanston. The Bears' Wrigley Field landlord, the Chicago Cubs, were in a pennant race and might play in the National League Championship Series and World Series, and that Wrigley Field would be unavailable (at least for installation of temporary seating in right and center field) until well into October. (The Cubs were in contention in the National League East until the final week of the 1970 season, thus rendering the anticipation moot.)

In addition, the NFL was pressuring the Bears to move out of Wrigley Field, because it had no lights (installed in 1988) and its seating capacity was under 50,000 (even with additional seating in right field for football games), stipulations of the AFL–NFL merger agreement. The Bears planned to move to Evanston for the 1971 season, but Evanston residents petitioned city officials to block the move, and the Big Ten Conference ultimately barred the Bears from using Dyche Stadium; the Bears moved to Chicago's Soldier Field.

=== Schedule ===
Week	Date	Opponent	Result	Record	Venue	Attendance
1	September 19	at New York Giants	**W** 24–16	1–0	Yankee Stadium	62,936
2	September 27	Philadelphia Eagles	**W** 20–16	2–0	Dyche Stadium	53,463
3	October 5	at **Detroit Lions**	**L** 14–28	2–1	Tiger Stadium	58,210
4	October 11	**Minnesota Vikings**	**L** 0–24	2–2	Wrigley Field	45,485
5	October 18	San Diego Chargers	**L** 7–20	2–3	Wrigley Field	45,278
6	October 25	**Detroit Lions**	**L** 10–16	2–4	Wrigley Field	45,632
7	November 1	at Atlanta Falcons	**W** 23–14	3–4	Atlanta Stadium	58,850
8	November 8	San Francisco 49ers	**L** 16–37	3–5	Wrigley Field	45,607
9	November 15	at **Green Bay Packers**	**L** 19–20	3–6	Lambeau Field	56,263
10	November 22	Buffalo Bills	**W** 31–13	4–6	Wrigley Field	41,015
11	November 29	at Baltimore Colts	**L** 20–21	4–7	Memorial Stadium	60,240
12	December 5	at **Minnesota Vikings**	**L** 13–16	4–8	Metropolitan Stadium	47,900
13	December 13	**Green Bay Packers**	**W** 35–17	5–8	Wrigley Field	44,957
14	December 20	at New Orleans Saints	**W** 24–3	6–8	Tulane Stadium	63,518
Note: Intra-division opponents are in **bold** text.

=== Season summary ===
==== Week 1 at Giants ====
Week One: Chicago Bears (0–0) at New York Giants (0–0)

Quarter	1	2	3	4	Total
**Bears**	7	3	7	7	**24**
Giants	10	3	0	3	**16**

at Yankee Stadium, Bronx, New York

- Date: September 19
- Game time: 8:00 p.m. EDT
- Game weather: Clear, 71 °F (22 °C)
- Referee: Fred Silva
- TV announcers (WBBM): Brent Musburger and Jerry Kramer
- Box Score

Game information

**First quarter**

- NYG – Pete Gogolak 25-yard field goal. Giants 3–0.
- CHI – Cecil Turner 95-yard kickoff return (Mac Percival kick). Bears 7–3.
- NYG – Ron Johnson 12-yard pass from Fran Tarkenton (Pete Gogolak kick). Giants 10–7.

**Second quarter**

- NYG – Pete Gogolak 20-yard field goal. Giants 13–7.
- CHI – Mac Percival 28-yard field goal. Giants 13–10.

**Third quarter**

- CHI – Jack Concannon 1-yard run (Mac Percival kick). Bears 17–13.

**Fourth quarter**

- NYG – Pete Gogolak 45-yard field goal. Bears 17–16.
- CHI – Dick Gordon 19-yard pass from Jack Concannon (Mac Percival kick). Bears 24–16.

Top passers

- CHI – Jack Concannon – 15/29, 148 yards, TD, INT
- NYG – Fran Tarkenton – 23/39, 277 yards, TD, 2 INT

Top rushers

- CHI – Gale Sayers – 17 rushes, 43 yards
- NYG – Ron Johnson – 13 rushes, 24 yards, TD

Top receivers

- CHI – Bob Wallace – 6 receptions, 82 yards
- NYG – Ron Johnson – 8 receptions, 85 yards, TD

==== Week 2 ====
Team	1	2	3	4	Total
Eagles	6	3	0	7	16
• **Bears**	7	10	0	3	20

- Date: September 27
- Location: Dyche Stadium • Evanston, Illinois
- Game start: 1:00 p.m. CST
- Game weather: 52 °F (11 °C) • Wind 9 mph (14 km/h)
- Referee: Fred Swearingen
- TV announcers (CBS): Jack Whitaker and Tom Brookshier

Scoring summary
1	CHI	Cecil Turner 96-yard kickoff return (Mac Percival kick)	Bears 7–0
1	PHI	Gary Ballman 7-yard pass from Norm Snead (kick failed)	Bears 7–6
2	CHI	Mac Percival 17-yard field goal	Bears 10–6
2	PHI	Mark Moseley 42-yard field goal	Bears 10–9
2	CHI	Dick Gordon 12-yard pass from Ronnie Bull (Mac Percival kick)	Bears 17–9
4	PHI	Lee Bouggess 10-yard run (Mark Moseley kick)	Bears 17–16
4	CHI	Mac Percival 36-yard field goal	Bears 20–16

==== Week 7 ====
Team	1	2	3	4	Total
• Bears	10	3	7	3	23
Falcons	0	7	7	0	14

- Date: November 1
- Location: Atlanta Stadium, Atlanta
- Game start: 1:00 p.m.
- Game weather: 62 °F (17 °C); wind 7 mph (11 km/h)

Scoring summary
Q1	CHI	Shy 1 yard run (Percival kick)	CHI 7–0
Q1	CHI	Percival 30 yard field goal	CHI 10–0
Q2	ATL	Gipson 20 yard pass from Berry (Vinyard kick)	CHI 10–7
Q2	CHI	Percival 47 yard field goal	CHI 13–7
Q3	ATL	Mitchell 17 yard pass from Berry (Vinyard kick)	ATL 14–13
Q3	CHI	Turner 94 yard kickoff return (Percival kick)	CHI 20–14
Q4	CHI	Percival 31 yard field goal	CHI 23–14

==== Week 10 ====
Team	1	2	3	4	Total
Bills	6	0	0	7	13
• **Bears**	0	14	7	10	31

- Date: November 22
- Location: Wrigley Field • Chicago
- Game start: 1:00 p.m. CST
- Game weather: 43 °F (6 °C) • Wind 22 mph (35 km/h)
- Referee: John McDonough

Scoring summary
1	BUF	Butch Byrd 23-yard interception return (kick failed)	Bills 6–0
2	CHI	Dick Gordon 36-yard pass from Bobby Douglass (Mac Percival kick)	Bears 7–6
2	CHI	Jim Seymour 36-yard pass from Bobby Douglass (Mac Percival kick)	Bears 14–6
3	CHI	Jim Seymour 53-yard pass from Bobby Douglass (Mac Percival kick)	Bears 21–6
4	BUF	Marlin Briscoe 17-yard pass from Dennis Shaw (Grant Guthrie kick)	Bears 21–13
4	CHI	Mac Percival 37-yard field goal	Bears 24–13
4	CHI	Dick Gordon 28-yard pass from Bobby Douglass (Mac Percival kick)	Bears 31–13

==== Week 13 ====
Green Bay Packers at Chicago Bears

Team	1	2	3	4	Total
Packers	3	0	0	14	17
• **Bears**	14	7	7	7	35

- Date: Sunday, December 13
- Location: Wrigley Field, Chicago
- Game start: 1:00 p.m. CST
- Game weather: 32 °F (0 °C), wind 11 mph (18 km/h)
- Referee: Fred Silva
- Source: Pro-Football-Reference.com

Scoring summary
1	Bears	Dick Gordon 15-yard pass from Jack Concannon (Mac Percival kick)	Bears 7–0
1	Bears	George Farmer 42-yard pass from Jack Concannon (Mac Percival kick)	Bears 14–0
1	Packers	Dale Livingston 32-yard field goal	Bears 14–3
2	Bears	Jack Concannon 15-yard run (Mac Percival kick)	Bears 21–3
3	Bears	Dick Gordon 25-yard pass from Jack Concannon (Mac Percival kick)	Bears 28–3
4	Packers	Donny Anderson 7-yard run (Dale Livingston kick)	Bears 28–10
4	Bears	Ray Ogden 6-yard pass from Jack Concannon (Mac Percival kick)	Bears 35–10
4	Packers	John Hilton 29-yard pass from Rick Norton (Dale Livingston kick)	Bears 35–17

==== Week 14 ====
Team	1	2	3	4	Total
• Bears	0	7	3	14	24
Saints	0	3	0	0	3

- Date: December 20
- Location: Tulane Stadium, New Orleans
- Game start: 1:00 p.m. CST
- Game weather: 65 °F (18 °C); wind 7 mph (11 km/h)
- Referee: Jack Reader
- TV announcers (CBS): Jack Drees and Eddie LeBaron

Scoring summary
Q2	NO	Dempsey 47 yard field goal	NO 3–0
Q2	CHI	Seymour 22 yard pass from Concannon (Percival kick)	CHI 7–3
Q3	CHI	Percival 50 yard field goal	CHI 10–3
Q4	CHI	Seymour 2 yard pass from Concannon (Percival kick)	CHI 17–3
Q4	CHI	Gordon 14 yard pass from Concannon (Percival kick)	CHI 24–3

- Jack Concannon 26/50, 280 Yds
- Dick Gordon 9 Rec, 119 Yds

=== Standings ===
NFC Central
	W	L	T	PCT	DIV	CONF	PF	PA	STK
Minnesota Vikings	12	2	0	.857	5–1	10–1	335	143	W3
Detroit Lions	10	4	0	.714	4–2	7–4	347	202	W5
Green Bay Packers	6	8	0	.429	2–4	4–7	196	293	L2
Chicago Bears	6	8	0	.429	1–5	5–6	256	261	W2

Note: Tie games were not officially counted in the standings until 1972.
