= 1971 Chicago Bears season =

NFL team season

- Owner: George Halas
- Head coach: Jim Dooley
- Home stadium: Soldier Field

Results
- Record: 6–8
- Division place: 3rd NFC Central
- Playoffs: Did not qualify

The 1971 Chicago Bears season was their 52nd regular season completed in the National Football League. The team finished with a 6–8 record, another below .500 showing, eventually costing head coach Jim Dooley his job. This was their 1st season at Soldier Field.

== Offseason ==
=== NFL draft ===
1971 Chicago Bears draft
Round	Pick	Player	Position	College	Notes
1	11	Joe Moore	Running back	Missouri	
2	28	Jim Harrison	Running back	Missouri	
2	36	Charlie Ford	Cornerback	Houston	
3	64	Tony McGee	Defensive end	Bishop	
3	71	Bob Newton	Tackle	Nebraska	
4	89	Jerry Moore	Safety	Arkansas	
6	135	Earl Thomas	Wide receiver	Houston	
7	167	Buddy Lee	Quarterback	LSU	
7	176	Dennis Ferris	Running back	Pittsburgh	
8	192	Karl Weiss	Tackle	Vanderbilt	
9	220	Lester McClain	Wide receiver	Tennessee	
10	245	Larry Rowden	Linebacker	Houston	
11	270	Cliff Hardy	Cornerback	Michigan State	
12	298	Steve Booras	Defensive end	Mesa C. C.	
13	323	Ed Nicholas	Tackle	N. C. State	
14	347	Willie Lewis	Running back	Arizona	
15	376	Ron Maciejowski	Quarterback	Ohio State	
16	401	Sid Bailey	Defensive end	Texas–Arlington	
17	426	Ray Garganes	Linebacker	Millersville	
Made roster * Made at least one Pro Bowl during career

== Roster ==
1971 Chicago Bears roster
Quarterbacks (QB): 10 Bobby Douglass; 16 Kent Nix; Running backs (RB): 33 Jim Grabowski; 35 Jim Harrison; 49 Joe Moore; 22 Cyril Pinder; 24 Don Shy; 34 Bill Tucker; Wide receivers (WR): 43 George Farmer; 45 Dick Gordon; 84 Jim Seymour; 21 Cecil Turner; Tight ends (TE): 38 Ray Ogden; 82 Earl Thomas; 89 Bob Wallace	Offensive linemen (OL): 72 Jim Cadile G; 70 Jeff Curchin T; 52 Rich Coady C; 50 Gene Hamlin C; 61 Glen Holloway G; 65 Randy Jackson T; 78 Bob Newton G; 73 Steve Wright T; Defensive linemen (DL): 75 Dave Hale DE; 85 Willie Holman DE; 71 Tony McGee DT; 87 Ed O'Bradovich DE; 67 George Seals DT; 76 Bill Staley DT	Linebackers (LB): 31 Ross Brupbacher OLB; 55 Doug Buffone OLB; 51 Dick Butkus MLB; 30 Jimmy Gunn OLB; 53 Larry Rowden MLB; Defensive backs (DB): 32 Charlie Ford CB; 29 Bob Jeter CB; 18 Jerry Moore FS; 44 Garry Lyle FS; 48 Ron Smith SS; 20 Joe Taylor CB; Special teams (ST): 88 Bobby Joe Green P; 83 Mac Percival K	Practice squad: 17 Cliff Hardy CB; 79 John Hoffman DE; 14 Buddy Lee QB; Reserve: 46 Craig Baynham RB (IR); 11 Jack Concannon QB (IR); 40 Gale Sayers RB (IR); Rookies in italics

== Schedule ==
Week	Date	Opponent	Result	Record	Venue	Attendance
1	September 19	Pittsburgh Steelers	**W** 17–15	1–0	Soldier Field	55,049
2	September 26	at **Minnesota Vikings**	**W** 20–17	2–0	Metropolitan Stadium	47,900
3	October 3	at Los Angeles Rams	**L** 3–17	2–1	Los Angeles Memorial Coliseum	66,957
4	October 10	New Orleans Saints	**W** 35–14	3–1	Soldier Field	55,049
5	October 17	at San Francisco 49ers	**L** 0–13	3–2	Candlestick Park	44,000
6	October 24	at **Detroit Lions**	**W** 28–23	4–2	Tiger Stadium	54,418
7	October 31	Dallas Cowboys	**W** 23–19	5–2	Soldier Field	55,049
8	November 7	**Green Bay Packers**	**L** 14–17	5–3	Soldier Field	55,049
9	November 14	Washington Redskins	**W** 16–15	6–3	Soldier Field	55,049
10	November 21	**Detroit Lions**	**L** 3–28	6–4	Soldier Field	55,049
11	November 29	at Miami Dolphins	**L** 3–34	6–5	Miami Orange Bowl	75,312
12	December 5	at Denver Broncos	**L** 3–6	6–6	Mile High Stadium	51,200
13	December 12	at **Green Bay Packers**	**L** 10–31	6–7	Lambeau Field	56,263
14	December 19	**Minnesota Vikings**	**L** 10–27	6–8	Soldier Field	55,049
Note: Intra-division opponents are in **bold** text.

== Game summaries ==
=== Week 1 ===
Week One: Pittsburgh Steelers (0–0) at Chicago Bears (0–0)

Quarter	1	2	3	4	Total
Steelers	0	6	6	3	15
Bears	0	3	0	14	17

at Soldier Field, Chicago, Illinois

- Date: September 19, 1971
- Game time: 2:00 p.m.
- Game weather: 63 °F (17 °C)
- Game attendance: 55,049
- Referee: Bernie Ulman
- Pro-Football-Reference.com

Game information

Second quarter

- PIT – Preston Pearson fumble recovery in end zone (kick failed). Steelers 6–0. Drive:
- CHI – Mac Percival 33-yard field goal. Steelers 6–3. Drive:

Third quarter

- PIT – Roy Gerela 32-yard field goal. Steelers 9–3. Drive:
- PIT – Roy Gerela 29-yard field goal. Steelers 12–3. Drive:

Fourth quarter

- PIT – Roy Gerela 42-yard field goal. Steelers 15–3. Drive:
- CHI – Ross Brupbacher 30-yard fumble return (Mac Percival kick). Steelers 15–10.
- CHI – George Farmer 8-yard pass from Kent Nix (Mac Percival kick). Bears 17–15. Drive:

Top passers

- PIT – Terry Bradshaw – 10/24, 129 yards, 4 INT
- CHI – Jack Concannon – 15/26, 116 yards, INT

Top rushers

- PIT – John Fuqua – 17 rushes, 114 yards
- CHI – Don Shy – 9 rushes, 19 yards

Top receivers

- PIT – Ron Shanklin – 6 receptions, 113 yards
- CHI – George Farmer – 4 receptions, 59 yards, TD

=== Week 2 ===
Team	1	2	3	4	Total
• Bears	0	0	3	17	20
Vikings	0	7	10	0	17

- Date: September 26
- Location: Metropolitan Stadium
- Game start: 1:00 p.m. CST
- Game weather: 56 °F (13 °C); wind 13 mph (21 km/h)
- Referee: Fred Silva

Scoring summary
Q2	MIN	Grim 4 yard pass from Cuozzo (Cox kick)	MIN 7–0
Q3	CHI	Percival 45 yard field goal	MIN 7–3
Q3	MIN	Grim 52 yard pass from Cuozzo (Cox kick)	MIN 14–3
Q3	MIN	Cox 14 yard field goal	MIN 17–3
Q4	CHI	Gordon 36 yard pass from Nix (Percival kick)	MIN 17–10
Q4	CHI	Percival 45 yard field goal	MIN 17–13
Q4	CHI	Gordon 19 yard pass from Nix (Percival kick)	CHI 20–17

- Dick Gordon 10 Rec, 115 Yds

=== Week 6 ===
Week Six: Chicago Bears (3–2) at Detroit Lions (4–1)

Quarter	1	2	3	4	Total
Bears	7	14	0	7	28
Lions	6	14	3	0	23

at Tiger Stadium, Detroit, Michigan

- Date: October 24, 1971
- Game time: 2:00 p.m. EST
- Game weather: 60 °F (16 °C)
- Game attendance: 54,418
- Referee: Jack Reader
- Pro-Football-Reference.com

Game information

First quarter

- DET – Errol Mann 28-yard field goal. Lions 3–0. Drive:
- CHI – Don Shy 21-yard run (Mac Percival kick). Bears 7–3. Drive:
- DET – Errol Mann 49-yard field goal. Bears 7–6. Drive:

Second quarter

- CHI – George Farmer 54-yard pass from Bobby Douglass (Mac Percival kick). Bears 14–6. Drive:
- DET – Ron Jessie 102-yard kickoff return (Errol Mann kick). Bears 14–13.
- DET – Larry Walton 16-yard pass from Greg Landry (Errol Mann kick). Lions 20–14. Drive:
- CHI – Bob Wallace 15-yard pass from Bobby Douglass (Mac Percival kick). Bears 21–20. Drive:

Third quarter

- DET – Errol Mann 29-yard field goal. Lions 23–21. Drive:

Fourth quarter

- CHI – Bobby Douglass 1-yard run (Mac Percival kick). Bears 28–23. Drive:

Top passers

- CHI – Bobby Douglass – 15/21, 160 yards, 2 TD
- DET – Greg Landry – 11/26, 173 yards, TD, 2 INT

Top rushers

- CHI – Don Shy – 18 rushes, 99 yards, TD
- DET – Steve Owens – 16 rushes, 81 yards

Top receivers

- CHI – George Farmer – 6 receptions, 95 yards, TD
- DET – Altie Taylor – 4 receptions, 41 yards

Chuck Hughes became the first NFL player to die on the field during a game.

== Standings ==
NFC Central
	W	L	T	PCT	DIV	CONF	PF	PA	STK
Minnesota Vikings	11	3	0	.786	5–1	9–2	245	139	W2
Detroit Lions	7	6	1	.538	2–3–1	3–6–1	341	286	L2
Chicago Bears	6	8	0	.429	2–4	5–6	185	276	L5
Green Bay Packers	4	8	2	.333	2–3–1	2–7–2	274	298	L1

Note: Tie games were not officially counted in the standings until 1972.
