= 1970 New York Giants season =

NFL sports team season

- Owner: Wellington Mara
- Head coach: Alex Webster
- Home stadium: Yankee Stadium

Results
- Record: 9–5
- Division place: 2nd NFC East
- Playoffs: Did not qualify
- Pro Bowlers: QB Fran Tarkenton; RB Ron Johnson

The 1970 New York Giants season was the franchise's 46th season in the NFL. This was the first season for the Giants after the AFL–NFL merger, in which ten American Football League teams joined the NFL. The team was led by second-year head coach Alex Webster. The Giants finished the season 9–5 for their first winning season since 1963, but they missed the playoffs after losing their season finale against the Los Angeles Rams by a score of 31–3. The Giants finished second in the NFC East, a game behind the Dallas Cowboys. They also finished only one game out of a wild-card playoff spot, won by the Detroit Lions.

Probably more damaging to the Giants' playoff hopes than the loss to the Rams were losses to two of the NFL's weakest teams:

- The first was a 14–10 loss at New Orleans in week three. The Giants were the victims of a blown call by head linesman Bruce Finlayson, who ruled tight end Aaron Thomas to be out of bounds on what would have been a game-winning touchdown pass from Fran Tarkenton in the closing minutes. Replays showed Thomas had both feet down in bounds, with control of the ball. The Saints' only other win during their season came five weeks later when Tom Dempsey kicked a then-NFL record 63-yard field goal for a 19–17 decision over the Detroit Lions, ironically the team that beat out the Giants for the final playoff spot in the NFC.
- The second was a 23–20 setback at Philadelphia on Monday Night Football in week 10, the Giants' only setback in a 10-week stretch following the loss to the Saints. The game at Franklin Field was more memorable for the antics in the broadcast booth, where Howard Cosell vomited on Don Meredith's cowboy boots. Cosell took a taxi back to the hotel at halftime, leaving Meredith to finish the game with Keith Jackson.

The Saints finished with the NFL's second-worst record at 2–11–1 (the Giants beat the NFL's worst team of 1970, the 2–12 Boston Patriots); the Eagles were barely better at 3–10–1. The Giants also lost at home to the 6-8 Chicago Bears.

This was the closest the Giants came to qualifying for the playoffs in the 1970s. The franchise enjoyed only one other winning season in the decade, going 8–6 in 1972. Big Blue did not return to the playoffs until 1981, ending a drought which dated back to the 1963 NFL Championship.

== Offense ==
The 1970 Giants offense was led by Pro Bowl performers, quarterback Fran Tarkenton, and running back Ron Johnson. The team was in the top ten in several offensive categories including points, yards, and first downs. The team had over one hundred rushing yards in eleven of its fourteen games, including 202 yards in a week eight win against the Dallas Cowboys. The offense struggled when the team failed to run the ball well, as in the week fourteen loss to the Los Angeles Rams in which the Giants rushed for only 50 yards. When the team was able to run the ball and play defense they were able to win. In all their wins, they had at least 100 yards rushing. The leading passer was Fran Tarkenton, the leading rusher was Ron Johnson (the first Giant to rush for 1,000 yards in a season; 1,027), and the leading receiver was Clifton McNeil.

== Defense ==
The best defensive game by far for the Giants was the shutout of the Boston Patriots (2–12) in a week 5 victory. In that game, the Giants allowed only 155 total offensive yards against the team which finished the season with the league's worst record. The team leader in interceptions for the Giants was Willie Williams, who had six interceptions for 114 total interception yards.

The backbone of New York's defense was a stout front four, featuring ends Fred Dryer and Jim Kanicki and tackles Bob Lurtsema and Jerry Shay. Williams was part of a solid secondary which also included Tom Longo, Scott Eaton and Spider Lockhart. First round draft pick Jim Files moved in at the starting middle linebacker spot for the departed Henry Davis, who moved on to Pittsburgh.

== Special teams ==
The kicker for the Giants that season was Pete Gogolak. Gogolak was a perfect 32 of 32 in extra points but hit only 25 of 41 field goals attempted on the year, with his longest being a kick of 54 yards in week eight vs. the Cowboys, a kick which came on the same day Tom Dempsey set an NFL record with a 63-yard field goal for the Saints vs. the Lions, and 43-year-old George Blanda hit a 53-yard field goal at the gun to lift Oakland over Cleveland 23–20.

Bill Johnson and Ernie Koy shared punting duties for the Giants, and each was average for the position. Bobby Duhon and Les Shy were the main kick and punt returners, though neither returned a kick for a touchdown.

== Draft ==
1970 New York Giants draft
Round	Pick	Player	Position	College	Notes
1	13	Jim Files	LB	Oklahoma	
4	97	Wes Grant	DE	UCLA	
5	117	Claude Brumfield	OG	Tennessee St	
6	142	Duane Miller	WR	Drake	
9	221	Pat Hughes	C	Boston	
10	246	Matt Fortier	DE	Fairmont St	
11	273	Alan Pitcaithley	RB	Oregon	
12	298	Larry Nels	LB	Wyoming	
13	325	Gary Inskeep	OT	Wisconsin–Stout	
14	350	Rodney Brand	C	Arkansas	
15	377	Warren Muir	RB	South Carolina	
16	402	Vic Notling	DB	Xavier	
17	429	Walter Breaux	DT	Grambling	
Made roster † Pro Football Hall of Fame * Made at least one Pro Bowl during career

=== Undrafted free agents ===
1970 undrafted free agents of note
Player	Position	College
Bob Connors	Defensive back	Northeastern

== Roster ==
1970 New York Giants roster
Quarterbacks (QB): 11 Dick Shiner; 10 Fran Tarkenton; Running backs (RB): 28 Bobby Duhon; 24 Tucker Frederickson; 30 Ron Johnson; 40 Joe Morrison; 23 Ernie Koy P; 34 Les Shy; Wide receivers (WR): 85 Don Herrmann; 84 Rich Houston; 18 Clifton McNeil; Tight ends (TE): 88 Aaron Thomas; 38 Bob Tucker	Offensive linemen (OL): 77 Rich Buzin T; 65 Pete Case G; 61 Charlie Harper G; 56 Pat Hughes C; 53 Greg Larson C; 63 Doug Van Horn G; 69 Willie Young T; Defensive linemen (DL): 72 John Baker DE; 74 Dennis Crane DT; 89 Fred Dryer DE; 73 Jim Kanicki DT; 71 Bob Lurtsema DE; 75 Jerry Shay DT	Linebackers (LB): 51 John Douglas OLB; 58 Jim Files MLB; 64 Matt Hazeltine OLB; 55 Ralph Heck OLB; 52 John Kirby OLB; Defensive backs (DB): 21 Otto Brown FS; 20 Scott Eaton CB; 33 Joe Green CB/S; 43 Spider Lockhart FS; 44 Tom Longo SS; 41 Willie Williams CB; 26 Kenny Parker CB; Special teams (ST): 3 Pete Gogolak K; 36 Bill Johnson P	Practice squad: 60 Willie Banks T; 19 Ed Baker QB; 87 Rich Kotite TE; -- Vernon Vanoy DT; Reserve: 34 Junior Coffey RB (IR); -- Wes Grant DE (IR); Rookies in italics

== Schedule ==
Week	Date	Opponent	Result	Record	Venue	Attendance
1	September 19	Chicago Bears	**L** 16–24	0–1	Yankee Stadium	62,936
2	September 27	at **Dallas Cowboys**	**L** 10–28	0–2	Cotton Bowl	57,236
3	October 4	at New Orleans Saints	**L** 10–14	0–3	Tulane Stadium	69,126
4	October 11	**Philadelphia Eagles**	**W** 30–23	1–3	Yankee Stadium	62,820
5	October 18	at Boston Patriots	**W** 16–0	2–3	Harvard Stadium	39,091
6	October 25	**St. Louis Cardinals**	**W** 35–17	3–3	Yankee Stadium	62,984
7	November 1	at New York Jets	**W** 22–10	4–3	Shea Stadium	63,903
8	November 8	**Dallas Cowboys**	**W** 23–20	5–3	Yankee Stadium	62,938
9	November 15	**Washington Redskins**	**W** 35–33	6–3	Yankee Stadium	62,915
10	November 23	at **Philadelphia Eagles**	**L** 20–23	6–4	Franklin Field	59,117
11	November 29	at **Washington Redskins**	**W** 27–24	7–4	Robert F. Kennedy Memorial Stadium	50,415
12	December 6	Buffalo Bills	**W** 20–6	8–4	Yankee Stadium	62,870
13	December 13	at **St. Louis Cardinals**	**W** 34–17	9–4	Busch Memorial Stadium	50,845
14	December 20	Los Angeles Rams	**L** 3–31	9–5	Yankee Stadium	62,870
Note: Intra-division opponents are in **bold** text.

=== Standings ===
NFC East
	W	L	T	PCT	DIV	CONF	PF	PA	STK
Dallas Cowboys	10	4	0	.714	5–3	7–4	299	221	W5
New York Giants	9	5	0	.643	6–2	6–5	301	270	L1
St. Louis Cardinals	8	5	1	.615	5–3	6–5	325	228	L3
Washington Redskins	6	8	0	.429	3–5	4–7	297	314	W2
Philadelphia Eagles	3	10	1	.231	1–7	1–9–1	241	332	W1

Note: Tie games were not officially counted in the standings until 1972.

== Season summary ==
=== Week 1 vs Bears ===
Week One: Chicago Bears (0–0) at New York Giants (0–0)

Quarter	1	2	3	4	Total
Bears	7	3	7	7	24
Giants	10	3	0	3	16

at Yankee Stadium, Bronx, New York

- Date: September 19
- Game time: 8:00 p.m. EDT
- Game weather: Clear, 71 °F (22 °C)
- Referee: Fred Silva
- TV announcers (WBBM): Brent Musburger and Jerry Kramer
- Box Score

Game information

First quarter

- NYG – Pete Gogolak 25-yard field goal. Giants 3–0.
- CHI – Cecil Turner 95-yard kickoff return (Mac Percival kick). Bears 7–3.
- NYG – Ron Johnson 12-yard pass from Fran Tarkenton (Pete Gogolak kick). Giants 10–7.

Second quarter

- NYG – Pete Gogolak 20-yard field goal. Giants 13–7.
- CHI – Mac Percival 28-yard field goal. Giants 13–10.

Third quarter

- CHI – Jack Concannon 1-yard run (Mac Percival kick). Bears 17–13.

Fourth quarter

- NYG – Pete Gogolak 45-yard field goal. Bears 17–16.
- CHI – Dick Gordon 19-yard pass from Jack Concannon (Mac Percival kick). Bears 24–16.

Top passers

- CHI – Jack Concannon – 15/29, 148 yards, TD, INT
- NYG – Fran Tarkenton – 23/39, 277 yards, TD, 2 INT

Top rushers

- CHI – Gale Sayers – 17 rushes, 43 yards
- NYG – Ron Johnson – 13 rushes, 24 yards, TD

Top receivers

- CHI – Bob Wallace – 6 receptions, 82 yards
- NYG – Ron Johnson – 8 receptions, 85 yards, TD

== See also ==
- List of New York Giants seasons
