= Dick Bumpas =

American football player and coach (born 1949)

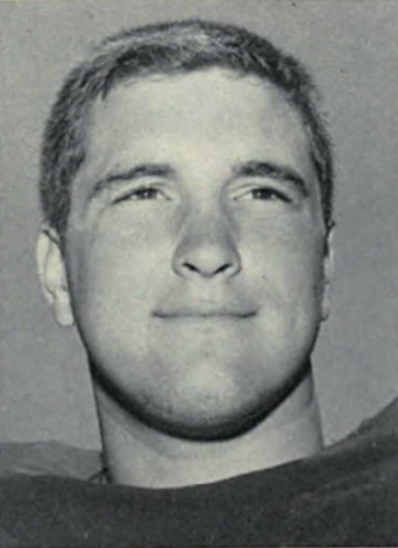
- Bumpas from 1969 "Razorback"

Biographical details
- Born: December 19, 1949 (age 76)

Playing career
- 1967–1970: Arkansas
- 1974: BC Lions
- 1974–1976: Memphis Southmen
- Positions: Defensive tackle, Defensive end, Tight end

Coaching career (HC unless noted)
- 1977: Arkansas (GA)
- 1978: Army (DL)
- 1979–1980: Air Force (DL)
- 1981–1982: Kansas State (DL)
- 1983–1984: Tennessee Tech (DC)
- 1985–1988: Tennessee (LB/ST)
- 1989: Arkansas (DL)
- 1990–1991: Notre Dame (DL)
- 1992–1994: Utah State (DC)
- 1995–1998: Navy (DC)
- 1999–2002: Houston (co-DC)
- 2003: Western Michigan (DC)
- 2004–2014: TCU (DC)

Accomplishments and honors

Awards
- Consensus All-American (1970); First-team All-SWC (1970); Second-team All-SWC (1969); Blue-Gray Game MVP (1970); Arkansas Sports Hall of Fame (2011); Southwest Conference Hall of Fame (2017)

Dick G. Bumpas (born December 19, 1949) is a retired American football coach and former player. He was an All-American defensive tackle at Arkansas and an assistant football coach at several college football programs, most notably an 11-year stint as the defensive coordinator at TCU.

== Early life and playing career ==
Bumpas grew up in Fort Smith, Arkansas, where he graduated from Southside High School in 1967 before enrolling at the University of Arkansas on a football scholarship.

Playing for Coach Frank Broyles at Arkansas, he helped the Razorbacks win a Southwest Conference title in 1968 before defeating Georgia in the Sugar Bowl on New Year's Day, 1969. While his junior season was remembered most for Arkansas' loss to Texas in the Game of the Century, Bumpas earned All-SWC honors and became a Consensus All-American as a senior in 1970.

After graduating from Arkansas, Bumpas played professional football for the BC Lions of the Canadian Football League and the Memphis Southmen of the World Football League.

== Coaching career ==
=== Early years ===
Bumpas began his coaching career when Broyles hired him as a graduate assistant at Arkansas in 1977 The next year, he took his first full-time job coaching defensive linemen at West Point. That season began a stretch of 26 in which Bumpas coached at 11 different schools. This stretch included stints working under coaches including Fisher DeBerry, Johnny Majors and Lou Holtz - and made him one of the few men to have coached at all three service academies.

=== TCU ===
During the journeyman phase of his career, Bumpas' time at Kansas State coincided with Wildcat safety Gary Patterson concluding his playing career in 1981 and beginning his coaching career as a graduate assistant under head coach Jim Dickey in 1982. This was the first of three times he would cross paths with Patterson as fellow assistants - along with their corresponding stints at Tennessee Tech, Utah State and Navy.

Patterson hired Bumpas to be his defensive coordinator at TCU in 2004, where they built the Frogs into a perennial defensive powerhouse running Patterson's 4-2-5 scheme. Bumpas' time in Fort Worth saw TCU jump from Conference USA to the Mountain West to the Big 12, winning five conference titles along the way.

Under Bumpas' leadership, three Horned Frogs earned AP 1st Team All-American honors on defense:

- Jerry Hughes - 2009
- Tejay Johnson - 2010
- Paul Dawson - 2014

Additionally, 22 different TCU defenders earned 1st Team All-Conference honors under Bumpas:

- Marvin Godbolt - 2004
- Tommy Blake - 2005, 2006
- Chase Ortiz - 2005, 2006, 2007
- Quincy Butler - 2005
- Jason Phillips - 2006, 2007
- Marvin White - 2006
- Jerry Hughes - 2008, 2009
- Robert Henson - 2008
- Stephen Hodge - 2008
- Daryl Washington - 2009
- Rafael Priest - 2009
- Nick Sanders - 2009
- Wayne Daniels - 2010
- Tank Carder - 2010, 2011
- Tejay Johnson - 2010
- Tanner Brock - 2010
- Greg McCoy - 2011
- Stansly Maponga - 2011, 2012
- Devonte Fields - 2012
- Jason Verrett - 2012, 2013
- Paul Dawson - 2014
- Chris Hackett - 2014

=== Conference titles ===
Over the course of his coaching career, Bumpas won eight conference titles with four different programs and in five different leagues:

Year	Team	Conference	Head Coach	Overall Record	Conference Record
1985	Tennessee	SEC	Johnny Majors	9–1-2	5–1
1989	Arkansas	SWC	Ken Hatfield	10-2	7-1
1993	Utah State	Big West	Charlie Weatherbie	7–5	5–1
2005	TCU	Mountain West	Gary Patterson	11-1	8-0
2009	TCU	Mountain West	Gary Patterson	12-1	8-0
2010	TCU	Mountain West	Gary Patterson	13-0	8-0
2011	TCU	Mountain West	Gary Patterson	11-2	7-0
2014	TCU	Big 12	Gary Patterson	12-1	8-1

=== Bowl games ===
Bumpas coached in 19 bowl games at 7 different programs, with his teams amassing a record of 14-5 in those games:

Season	Team	Bowl	Opponent	Result	Score	Head coach
1977	Arkansas	Orange Bowl	Oklahoma	Win	31–6	Lou Holtz
1982	Kansas State	Independence Bowl	Wisconsin	Loss	14–3	Jim Dickey
1985	Tennessee	Sugar Bowl	Miami	Win	35–7	Johnny Majors
1986	Tennessee	Liberty Bowl	Minnesota	Win	21–14	Johnny Majors
1987	Tennessee	Peach Bowl	Indiana	Win	27–22	Johnny Majors
1989	Arkansas	Cotton Bowl	Tennessee	Loss	31-27	Ken Hatfield
1990	Notre Dame	Orange Bowl	Colorado	Loss	10-9	Lou Holtz
1991	Notre Dame	Sugar Bowl	Florida	Win	39-28	Lou Holtz
1991	Utah State	Las Vegas Bowl	Ball State	Win	42-33	Charlie Weatherbie
1996	Navy	Aloha Bowl	Ball State	Win	43-38	Charlie Weatherbie
2005	TCU	Houston Bowl	Iowa State	Win	27-24	Gary Patterson
2006	TCU	Poinsettia Bowl	Northern Illinois	Win	37-7	Gary Patterson
2007	TCU	Texas Bowl	Houston	Win	20-13	Gary Patterson
2008	TCU	Poinsettia Bowl	Broncos	Win	17-16	Gary Patterson
2009	TCU	Fiesta Bowl	Broncos	Loss	17-10	Gary Patterson
2010	TCU	Rose Bowl	Wisconsin	Win	21-19	Gary Patterson
2011	TCU	Poinsettia Bowl	Louisiana Tech	Win	31-24	Gary Patterson
2012	TCU	Buffalo Wild Wings Bowl	Michigan State	Loss	17-16	Gary Patterson
2014	TCU	Peach Bowl	Ole Miss	Win	42-3	Gary Patterson

== Retirement ==
Bumpas announced his retirement from coaching on February 3, 2015. He was inducted into the Arkansas Sports Hall of Fame in while still coaching at TCU in 2011 and into the Southwest Conference Hall of Fame in 2017. He currently resides in Garfield, Arkansas with his wife, Gloria.
