= 1970 Notre Dame Fighting Irish football team =

American college football season

1970 Notre Dame Fighting Irish football

National champion (FACT, Matthews, Sagarin), Cotton Bowl champion

Cotton Bowl Classic, W 24–11 vs. Texas
- Conference: Independent

Ranking
- Coaches: No. 5
- AP: No. 2
- Record: 10–1
- Head coach: Ara Parseghian (7th season)
- MVP: Joe Theismann and Tim Kelly
- Captains: Larry DiNardo; Tim Kelly
- Home stadium: Notre Dame Stadium

1970 NCAA University Division independents football records
	Conf.			Overall
Team	W	L	T	W		L		T
No. 2 Notre Dame		–		10	–	1	–	0
Villanova		–		9	–	2	–	0
No. 16 Air Force		–		9	–	3	–	0
No. 13 Georgia Tech		–		9	–	3	–	0
Boston College		–		8	–	2	–	0
No. 19 Houston		–		8	–	3	–	0
West Virginia		–		8	–	3	–	0
No. 17 Tulane		–		8	–	4	–	0
No. 18 Penn State		–		7	–	3	–	0
West Texas State		–		7	–	3	–	0
Cincinnati		–		7	–	4	–	0
Florida State		–		7	–	4	–	0
Virginia Tech		–		5	–	6	–	0
Syracuse		–		6	–	4	–	0
Dayton		–		5	–	4	–	1
Pittsburgh		–		5	–	5	–	0
Rutgers		–		5	–	5	–	0
Utah State		–		5	–	5	–	0
Colgate		–		5	–	6	–	0
Southern Miss		–		5	–	6	–	0
New Mexico State		–		4	–	6	–	0
Miami (FL)		–		3	–	8	–	0
Northern Illinois		–		3	–	7	–	0
Marshall		–		3	–	6	–	0
Buffalo		–		2	–	9	–	0
Navy		–		2	–	9	–	0
Army		–		1	–	9	–	1
Xavier		–		1	–	9	–	0
Holy Cross		–		0	–	10	–	1
Rankings from AP Poll

The 1970 Notre Dame Fighting Irish football team was an American football team that represented the University of Notre Dame as an independent during the 1970 NCAA University Division football season. In their seventh year under head coach Ara Parseghian, the Irish compiled a 10–1 record, outscored opponents by a total of 330 to 97, and were ranked No. 2 in the final AP poll and No. 5 in the final UPI poll. They defeated No. 7 LSU and lost to unranked USC during the regular season and concluded the season with a 24–11 victory over No. 1 Texas in the Cotton Bowl.

End Tom Gatewood and offensive guard Larry DiNardo were consensus first-team picks on the 1970 All-America college football team. Quarterback Joe Theisman received fist-team All-America honors from the Associated Press, and Clarence Ellis received first-team honors from the Newspaper Enterprise Association and United Press International.. The team's statistical leaders during the regular season included Theisman (2,429 passing yards, 16 touchdown passes), Gatewood (77 catches for 1,123 receiving yards), Ed Gulyas (534 rushing yards), and Denny Allan and Scott Hempel (48 points scored each).

The team played its home games at Notre Dame Stadium in Notre Dame, Indiana.

== Schedule ==
Date	Time	Opponent	Rank	Site	TV	Result	Attendance	Source
September 19	2:30 p.m.	at Northwestern	No. 6	Dyche Stadium; Evanston, IL (rivalry)		W 35–14	50,409	
September 26	1:30 p.m.	Purdue	No. 6	Notre Dame Stadium; Notre Dame, IN (rivalry)		W 48–0	59,075	
October 3	2:30 p.m.	at Michigan State	No. 4	Spartan Stadium; East Lansing, MI (rivalry)		W 29–0	76,103	
October 10	1:30 p.m.	Army	No. 3	Notre Dame Stadium; Notre Dame, IN (rivalry)		W 51–10	59,075	
October 17	3:50 p.m.	at No. 18 Missouri	No. 3	Memorial Stadium; Columbia, MO	ABC	W 24–7	64,200	
October 31	1:32 p.m.	vs. Navy	No. 3	John F. Kennedy Stadium; Philadelphia, PA (rivalry)		W 56–7	45,226	
November 7	1:30 p.m.	Pittsburgh	No. 2	Notre Dame Stadium; Notre Dame, IN (rivalry)		W 46–14	59,075	
November 14	1:30 p.m.	Georgia Tech	No. 1	Notre Dame Stadium; Notre Dame, IN (rivalry)		W 10–7	59,075	
November 21	1:30 p.m.	No. 7 LSU	No. 2	Notre Dame Stadium; Notre Dame, IN		W 3–0	59,075	
November 28	4:15 p.m.	at USC	No. 4	Los Angeles Memorial Coliseum; Los Angeles, CA (rivalry)	ABC	L 28–38	64,694	
January 1, 1971	2:00 p.m.	vs. No. 1 Texas	No. 6	Cotton Bowl; Dallas, TX (Cotton Bowl Classic)	CBS	W 24–11	73,000	
Rankings from AP Poll released prior to the game; All times are in Eastern time; Source:

== Game summaries ==
=== Northwestern ===
	1	2	3	4	Total
Notre Dame	14	14	7	0	35
Northwestern	0	14	0	0	14

=== Purdue ===
Purdue Boilermakers at Notre Dame Fighting Irish

Quarter	1	2	3	4	Total
Purdue	0	0	0	0	0
Notre Dame	10	14	7	17	48

at Notre Dame Stadium • South Bend, Indiana

- Date: September 26
- Game weather: Rainy
- Game attendance: 59,075
- Box Score

Game information

Purdue

Notre Dame

- Joe Theismann
  16/24, 274 Yds, 3 TD
- Tom Gatewood
  12 Rec, 192 Yds, 3 TD

Scoring summary

Quarter	Time	Drive			Team	Scoring information	Score	
Quarter	Time	Plays	Yards	TOP	Team	Scoring information	PUR	ND
1					Notre Dame	19-yard field goal by Hempel	0	3
1			80		Notre Dame	Allan 4-yard touchdown run, Hempel kick good	0	10
2					Notre Dame	Gatewood 17-yard touchdown reception from Theismann, Hempel kick good	0	17
2	6:09				Notre Dame	Gatewood 7-yard touchdown reception from Theismann, Hempel kick good	0	24
3					Notre Dame	Gatewood 20-yard touchdown reception from Theismann, Hempel kick good	0	31
4					Notre Dame	37-yard field goal by Hempel	0	34
4					Notre Dame	Dewan 4-yard touchdown run, Hempel kick good	0	41
4					Notre Dame	Parker 63-yard touchdown run, Hempel kick good	0	48
"TOP" = time of possession. For other American football terms, see Glossary of American football.							0	48

=== Michigan State ===
Team	1	2	3	4	Total
• Notre Dame	7	15	0	7	29
Michigan St	0	0	0	0	0

- Date: October 3
- Location: Spartan Stadium, East Lansing, MI
- Game attendance: 76,103
- Referee: Jerry Markbreit

Scoring summary
Q1	ND	Barz 1 yard run (Hempel kick)	ND 7–0
Q2	ND	Minnix 1 yard run (Hempel kick)	ND 14–0
Q2	ND	Gulyas 2 yard run (Theismann run)	ND 22–0
Q4	ND	Parker 4 yard run (Hempel kick)	ND 29–0

- Joe Theismann 12/17, 147 Yds, 13 Rush, 107 Yds
- First Notre Dame game on artificial turf
- First Notre Dame win in East Lansing since 1949

=== Army ===
	1	2	3	4	Total
Army	0	3	7	0	10
Notre Dame	21	9	14	7	51

=== Missouri ===
Originally, Missouri was scheduled to host this game at Busch Memorial Stadium in St. Louis, but the St. Louis Cardinals forced the game to be moved to the University of Missouri campus because they anticipated hosting Game 6 of the World Series. As it turned out, the Cardinals finished a distant fourth place in the National League East, 13 games behind the Pittsburgh Pirates, and were below .500 from July 1 through the end of the season.

Team	1	2	3	4	Total
• Notre Dame	3	0	14	7	24
Missouri	0	0	7	0	7

- Date: October 17
- Location: Memorial Stadium, Columbia, MO
- Game start: 2:50 p.m. CDT
- TV announcers (ABC): Chris Schenkel, Bud Wilkinson

=== Navy ===
Team	1	2	3	4	Total
• Notre Dame	7	28	7	14	56
Navy	7	0	0	0	7

- Date: October 31
- Location: JFK Stadium, Philadelphia, Pennsylvania

Scoring summary
1	Notre Dame	Dewan 3-yard run (Hempel kick)	Notre Dame 7-0
1	Navy	Dillon 5-yard run (Lanning kick)	Tie 7-7
2	Notre Dame	Barz 2-yard run (Hempel kick)	Notre Dame 14-7
2	Notre Dame	Barz 1-yard run (Hempel kick)	Notre Dame 21-7
2	Notre Dame	Gatewood 6-yard pass from Theismann (Hempel kick)	Notre Dame 28-7
2	Notre Dame	Gatewood 29-yard pass from Theismann (Hempel kick)	Notre Dame 35-7
3	Notre Dame	Allan 3-yard run (Hempel kick)	Notre Dame 42-7
4	Notre Dame	Diestowski 30-yard run (Hempel kick)	Notre Dame 49-7
4	Notre Dame	Minnix 5-yard run (Hempel kick)	Notre Dame 56-7

=== Pittsburgh ===
	1	2	3	4	Total
Pittsburgh	0	14	0	0	14
Notre Dame	7	18	6	15	46

=== Georgia Tech ===
	1	2	3	4	Total
Georgia Tech	0	0	7	0	7
Notre Dame	0	0	3	7	10

=== LSU ===
Team	1	2	3	4	Total
LSU	0	0	0	0	0
• Notre Dame	0	0	0	3	3

- Date: November 21
- Location: Notre Dame Stadium, South Bend, Indiana
- Game start: 1:30 p.m. EST
- Game attendance: 59,075
- Game weather: mostly cloudy, 47 degrees, wind S 15-18 MPH
- Referee: Jerry Markbreit

Scoring summary
4	02:54	Notre Dame	Hempel 24-yard field goal	Notre Dame 3-0

=== USC ===
Notre Dame quarterback Joe Theismann completed 33 of 58 passes for a school-record 526 yards, and the Irish outgained the Trojans 557–359, but committed eight turnovers to zero for Southern Cal.

Team	1	2	3	4	Total
Notre Dame	7	7	7	7	28
• So. Cal.	21	3	14	0	38

- Date: November 28
- Location: Los Angeles Memorial Coliseum
- Game start: 1:30 p.m. PST
- Game weather: High 50s, heavy rain
- TV announcers (ABC): Chris Schenkel, Bud Wilkinson

=== 1971 Cotton Bowl vs. Texas ===
#6 Notre Dame vs. #1 Texas

Team	1	2	3	4	Total
• Notre Dame	14	10	0	0	24
Texas	3	8	0	0	11

- Date: January 1, 1971
- Location: Cotton Bowl, Dallas, Texas
- Game start: 1:00 CST
- Game attendance: 72,000
- Referee: Gene Calhoun (Big Ten)
- TV announcers (CBS): Lindsey Nelson, Tom Brookshier

== Roster ==
1970 Notre Dame Fighting Irish football team roster
Players
Coaches
Offense

Pos.	#	Name	Class
RB	22	Denny Allan	Sr
QB	4	Jim Bulger	So
FB	33	Bill Barz	Jr
FB	35	John Cieszkowski	Jr
TE	91	Mike Creaney	So
G	67	John Dampeer	Jr
RB	10	Daryll Dewan	So
G	56	Larry DiNardo	Sr
RB	19	Bill Gallagher	Jr
OT	70	Tom Gasseling	Sr
WR	44	Tom Gatewood	Jr
RB	12	Ed Gulyas	Jr
RB		Denny Gutkowski
RB		Ron Johnson
OL	62	Gary Kos	Sr
OT	73	Mike Martin	Jr
RB	18	Bob Minnix	Jr
RB	28	Chuck Nightingale	Sr
C	50	Dan Novakov	Jr
RB	26	Larry Parker	So
QB	11	Pat Steenberge	So
C	90	John Tereschuk	So
QB	7	Joe Theismann	Sr
WR	80	Willie Townsend	So
WR	82	Bill Trapp	Jr

Defense

Pos.	#	Name	Class
DB	17	Mike Crotty	Jr
DB	23	Clarence Ellis	Jr
DB	5	Terry Garner	So
DT	72	Mike Kadish	Sr
LB	42	Tim Kelly	Jr
DT	75	Greg Marx	Jr
LB	43	Tom McHale	Sr
DB	1	Tom Menie	Jr
DT	74	Pat Mudron	Sr
DL	88	Bob Neidert	Sr
LB	81	Jim O'Malley	So
DB	38	Dan O'Toole	So
LB	45	Eric Patton	Jr
DE	85	Walt Patulski	Jr
DB	6	Jim Roolf	So
DT	68	Pete Schivarelli	Sr
DB	21	Ralph Stepaniak	Jr
DE	93	Fred Swendsen	Jr
LB	38	Rick Thomann	Jr
LB	61	Mike Webb	So
LB	40	Jim Wright	Sr
DL	79	Mike Zikas	Jr

Special teams

Pos.	#	Name	Class
K	52	Scott Hempel	Sr
P	9	Jim Yoder	Jr

Head coach

- Ara Parseghian

Coordinators/assistant coaches

Legend

- (C) Team captain
- (S) Suspended
- (I) Ineligible
- Injured
- Redshirt

== Team players in the NFL ==
Player	Position	Round	Pick	NFL club
Joe Theismann	Quarterback	4	99	Miami Dolphins
Tim Kelly	Linebacker	5	105	New England Patriots
Larry DiNardo	Guard	4	158	New Orleans Saints
Jim Wright	Linebacker	15	382	New York Giants
Gary Kos	Guard	15	384	Los Angeles Rams
