= Jim Barnes (offensive guard) =

American football player

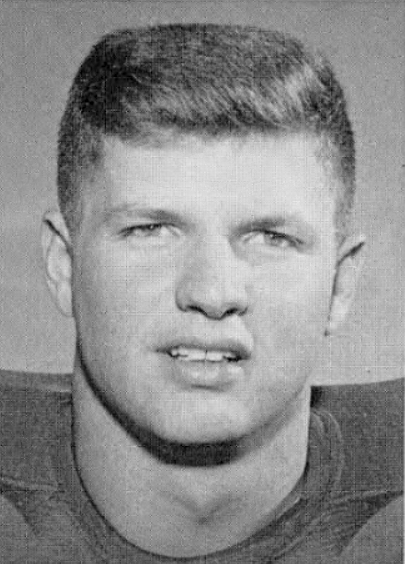
- Barnes from 1967 "Razorback"

Profile
- Position: Offensive guard

Personal information
- Listed height: 6 ft 4 in (1.93 m)
- Listed weight: 235 lb (107 kg)

Career information
- College: University of Arkansas

Career history
- 1966–1968: Arkansas Razorbacks

Awards and highlights
- Consensus All-American (1968); First-team All-SWC (1968)

Jim Donald Barnes is an American former football offensive guard. He played for the Arkansas Razorbacks and was selected as a consensus first-team All-American in 1968.

== Football career ==
Barnes attended the University of Arkansas where he initially hoped to play at the end or linebacker position for the Razorbacks. He ended up as a starter on the offensive line under head coach Frank Broyles. He helped lead the 1968 Arkansas Razorbacks football team to a 10–1, a #6 rating in the AP Poll, and a victory over Georgia in the 1969 Sugar Bowl. Following the victory over favored Georgia in the Sugar Bowl, Barnes said: "I have never been associated with a bunch of boys like this. They've given up more and sacrificed more than any group I've ever seen."

Barnes was a consensus selection at the guard position on the 1968 College Football All-America Team, receiving first-team honors from the Associated Press and Central Press. He was drafted by the Minnesota Vikings in the fifth round (106th overall pick) of the 1969 NFL/AFL draft, but he did not play in the National Football League.

Barnes had polio in the third grade and was in bed for six-and-a-half months. Barnes later recalled that his childhood struggle with polio gave him "an incentive to work a little harder." When he was named to the All-American team in December 1968, the Associated Press story noted: "Jim Barnes looks more like an All-American than a polio victim."
