= 1970 Sugar Bowl =

American college football game

- 36th Sugar Bowl
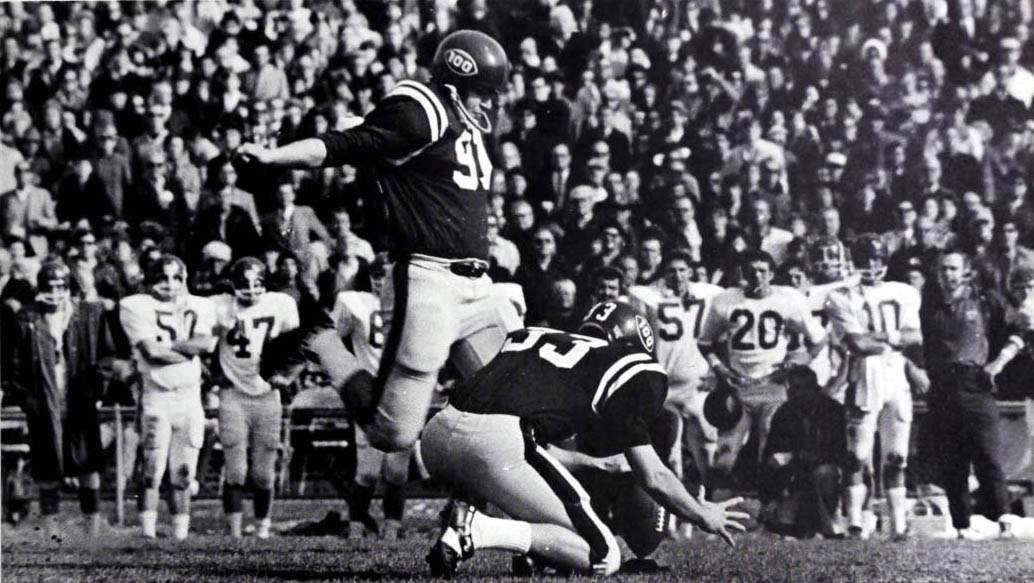
- A moment of the game: Cloyce Hinton kicking for Ole Miss
Arkansas Razorbacks	Ole Miss Rebels
(9–1)	(7–3)
SWC	SEC
22	27
Head coach: Frank Broyles	Head coach: Johnny Vaught
AP / Coaches; 3 / 3	AP / Coaches; 13 / 13
	1	2	3	4	Total
Arkansas	0	12	3	7	22
Ole Miss	14	10	3	0	27
- Date: January 1, 1970
- Season: 1969
- Stadium: Tulane Stadium
- Location: New Orleans, Louisiana
- MVP: Archie Manning (Ole Miss QB)
- Favorite: Arkansas by 3 points
- Referee: Charles Bowen (SEC) (split crew: SEC and SWC)
- Halftime show: Benjamin Rickman & The Heartwoods
- Attendance: 80,096

United States TV coverage
- Network: ABC
- Announcers: Chris Schenkel, Bud Wilkinson

The 1970 Sugar Bowl was the 36th edition of the college football bowl game, played at Tulane Stadium in New Orleans, Louisiana, on Thursday, January 1. It featured the third-ranked Arkansas Razorbacks of the Southwest Conference (SWC) and the #13 Ole Miss Rebels of the Southeastern Conference (SEC). Ole Miss upset Arkansas, 27–22.

== Teams ==
Arkansas entered the game with a 9–1 record and #3 national ranking and Ole Miss was at 7–3. The two neighboring states had developed a rivalry, with a yearly series ending in 1961, and had met in the Sugar Bowl seven years earlier.

=== Arkansas ===
The Razorbacks were making a return trip to the Sugar Bowl, following up a victory in the 1969 Sugar Bowl. Starting 9–0, the Razorbacks ended the regular season with a loss to the Texas Longhorns in The Big Shootout, watching a 14–0 lead evaporate into a 15–14 loss when Texas scored two touchdowns in the fourth quarter. This loss to the #1 Longhorns cost the Hogs, ranked #2 at the time by the Associated Press and #3 by United Press International, a Southwest Conference championship and a chance at the national championship.

=== Mississippi ===
Ole Miss, led by coaching great Johnny Vaught and quarterback Archie Manning entered the game at 7–3. The Rebels were invited to the Sugar Bowl on the strength of November victories over SEC powers LSU (26–23) and Tennessee (38–0), both at Mississippi Veterans Memorial Stadium in Jackson.

== Game summary ==
Ole Miss running back Bo Bowen scampered 69 yards to open the scoring, with Archie Manning adding another 18-yard TD run. Down 14–0, Arkansas responded with a 12-yard TD run by Bill Burnett, but the extra point was missed, and after a Rebel field goal and Archie Manning 30-yard TD strike, the Razorbacks were down 24–6. Before halftime, Chuck Dicus hauled in a 47-yard pass from Bill Montgomery, but the two-point conversion was incomplete, and the Rebels took a 24–12 lead to halftime.

The third quarter produced a field goal from each team, and in the fourth quarter fullback Bruce Maxwell caught a six-yard strike from Montgomery to cut the lead to five, but the rally fell short, the Hogs losing by a 27–22 final.

Though Manning's sons Peyton and Eli later became star quarterbacks in the SEC (at Tennessee and Ole Miss, respectively), neither played in the Sugar Bowl.

Scoring summary

Quarter	Time	Drive			Team	Scoring information	Score	
Quarter	Time	Plays	Yards	TOP	Team	Scoring information	ARK	UM
1			80		UM	Bo Bowen 69-yard touchdown run, King kick good	0	7
1			80		UM	Archie Manning 18-yard touchdown run, King kick good	0	14
2			81		ARK	Bill Burnett 12-yard touchdown run, Bill McClard kick no good	6	14
2			57		UM	52-yard field goal by Hinton	6	17
2			55		UM	Vernon Studdard 30-yard touchdown reception from Manning, King kick good	6	24
2			80		ARK	Chuck Dicus 47-yard touchdown reception from Bill Montgomery, 2-point pass no good	12	24
3			44		UM	36-yard field goal by Hinton	12	27
3			80		ARK	35-yard field goal by McClard	15	27
4			11		ARK	Bruce Maxwell 6-yard touchdown reception from Montgomery, McClard kick good	22	27
"TOP" = time of possession. For other American football terms, see Glossary of American football.							22	27

== Statistics ==
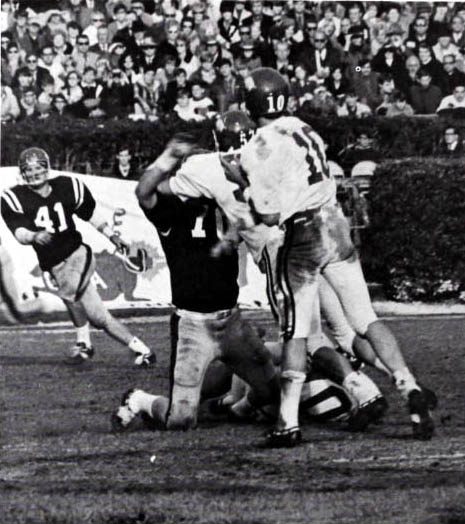
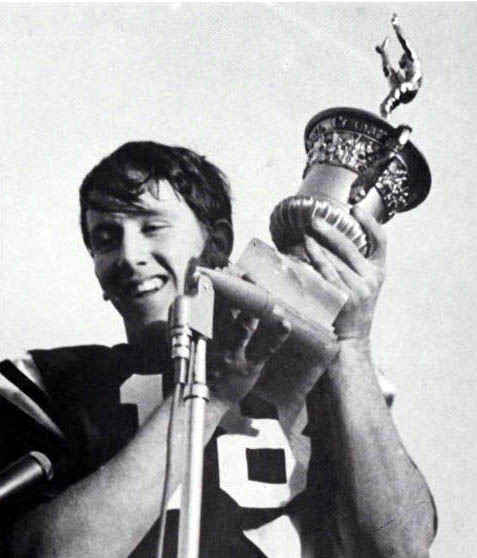
(Left): Arkansas QB Montgomery attempts a pass; (right): Ole Miss QB Archie Manning celebrating with the trophy

Statistics	Arkansas	Ole Miss
First downs	24	21
Rushing	37–189	36–154
Passing	16–34–2	21–35–2
Passing yards	338	273
Total offense	72–527	71–427
Punts–avg.	2–30.5	6–37.6
Fumbles–lost	1–1	0–0
Turnovers	3	2
Penalties–yards	3–22	11–101

== Aftermath ==
The playing field was left in very poor condition for Super Bowl IV, which was held in the stadium ten days later. When the National Football League awarded Super Bowl VI to Tulane Stadium in March 1971, it stipulated the university and the New Orleans Saints install artificial turf.

This was the final bowl game featuring two all-white squads. Arkansas' first black varsity player, Jon Richardson, suited up in 1970, and Ole Miss followed suit in 1972 with Ben Williams. Ole Miss was one of the last major college programs to desegregate their varsity teams, along with SEC rival LSU and BYU.

Manning returned to the Crescent City less than two years later when the New Orleans Saints selected him second overall (behind Jim Plunkett) in the 1971 NFL draft. Manning played for the Saints from 1971 until he was traded after the first game of the 1982 season.

The Razorbacks and Rebels renewed their annual series in the 1980s, and in 1992, they became conference rivals when Arkansas joined the SEC. Houston Nutt was the head coach of both programs: the Razorbacks from 1998 to 2007 and the Rebels from 2008 to 2011.

Arkansas has played in the Sugar Bowl twice since losing to Ole Miss. In 1980 (1979 season), the Razorbacks of Lou Holtz lost 24–9 to national champion Alabama (coached by Arkansas native Bear Bryant), and in 2011 (2010 season), the Bobby Petrino-led Hogs lost 31–26 to Ohio State (the Buckeyes later vacated the win following the discovery of numerous NCAA violations under the watch of coach Jim Tressel).

Ole Miss did not return to the Sugar Bowl until January 2016, when it defeated Oklahoma State 48–20.

== See also ==
- Arkansas–Ole Miss football rivalry
