= Cliff Hardy =

Cliff Hardy may refer to:

- Cliff Hardy (American football) (born 1947), American football player
- Cliff Hardy (character), a fictional Australian private eye created by Peter Corris
