= 1968 All-Southwest Conference football team =

American college football all-star team

The 1968 All-Southwest Conference football team consists of American football players chosen by various organizations for All-Southwest Conference teams for the 1968 NCAA University Division football season. The selectors for the 1968 season included the Associated Press (AP).

== All Southwest selections ==
=== Offense ===
==== Quarterbacks ====
- Edd Hargett, Texas A&M (AP-1)
- Bill Montgomery, Arkansas (AP-2)

==== Halfbacks ====
- Chris Gilbert, Texas (AP-1) (CHFOF)
- Mike Richardson, SMU (AP-1)
- Larry Stegenet, Texas A&M (AP-2)
- Bill Burnett, Arkansas (AP-2)

==== Fullbacks ====
- Jackie Stewart, Texas Tech (AP-1)
- Steve Worster, Texas (AP-1)

==== Split ends ====
- Jerry LeVias, SMU (AP-1) (CFHOF)
- Chuck Dicus, Arkansas (AP-2)

==== Tight ends ====
- Deryl Comer, Texas (AP-1)
- Ken Fleming, SMU (AP-2)

==== Tackles ====
- Dick Stevens, Baylor (AP-1)
- Terry May, SMU (AP-1)
- Leland Winston, Rice (AP-2)
- Webster Hubbell, Arkansas (AP-2)

==== Guards ====
- Jim Barnes, Arkansas (AP-1)
- Don King, Texas Tech (AP-1)
- Danny Abbott, Texas (AP-2)

==== Centers ====
- Rodney Brand, Arkansas (AP-1)
- Calvin Hunt, Baylor (AP-1)

=== Defense ===
==== Defensive ends ====
- Richard Campbell, Texas Tech (AP-1)
- Mike De Niro, Texas A&M (AP-1)
- Bruce Dowdy, Texas Tech (AP-2)
- Corby Robertson, Texas (AP-2)

==== Defensive tackles ====
- Leo Brooks, Texas (AP-1)
- Loyd Wainscott, Texas (AP-1)
- Jim Moylan, Texas Tech (AP-2)
- Gordon McNulty, Arkansas (AP-2)

==== Defensive guards ====
- Larry Adams, TCU (AP-1)
- Rolf Krueger, Texas A&M (AP-1)
- Tom Reaux, Baylor (AP-2)
- Lynn Odom, Texas A&M (AP-2)

==== Linebackers ====
- Bill Hobbs, Texas A&M (AP-1)
- Cliff Powell, Arkansas (AP-1)
- Bruce Protillo, SMU (AP-2)
- Glen Halsell, Texas (AP-2)

==== Defensive backs ====
- Gary Adams, Arkansas (AP-1)
- Larry Alford, Texas Tech (AP-1)
- Jim Livingston, SMU (AP-1)
- Charles Brightwell, TCU (AP-2)
- Ronnie Ehrig, Texas (AP-2)
- Ivan Jones, Texas A&M (AP-2)

=== Kicking specialists ===
- Ken Vinyard, Texas Tech (AP-1) (placekicker)
- Steve O'Neal, Texas A&M (AP-1) (punter)

Sophomore of the Year - Bill Montgomery, Arkansas Player of the Year - Chris Gilbert, Texas

== Key ==
AP = Associated Press

CFHOF = Player inducted into the College Football Hall of Fame

== See also ==
- 1968 College Football All-America Team
