= Rodney Brand =

American football player (born 1947)

Profile
- Position: Center

Personal information
- Born: August 20, 1947 (age 79); Newport, Arkansas, U.S.
- Listed height: 6 ft 3 in (1.91 m)
- Listed weight: 208 lb (94 kg)

Career information
- High school: Newport (AR)
- College: Arkansas
- NFL draft: 1970: 14th round, 350th overall pick

Career history
- New York Giants (1970)*
- * Offseason or practice squad member only

Awards and highlights
- Consensus All-American (1969); 2× First-team All-SWC (1968, 1969)

John Rodney Brand (born August 20, 1947) is an American former college football center who lettered at University of Arkansas in 1967, 1968 and 1969. He was a member of the 1969 College Football All-America Team. He played in the 1969 and 1970 Sugar Bowl, winning the former, and in the 1970 Hula Bowl.

Following his college career, he was selected by the New York Giants in the 14th round, 350th overall, in the 1970 NFL draft, but never played a regular season game in the National Football League (NFL).

Brand was later named to the 1960s Razorbacks All-Decade Team and was inducted into the University of Arkansas Hall of Fame in 2014.
