= Jerry Sanders =

Jerry Sanders may refer to:

- Jerry Sanders (businessman) (born 1936), co-founder and CEO of American semiconductor manufacturer Advanced Micro Devices (AMD)
- Jerry Don Sanders (born 1948), American football player and coach
- Jerry Sanders (politician) (born 1950), American politician in California
