= Bill Atessis =

American football player (born 1949)

No. 73, 77
- Position: Defensive end

Personal information
- Born: July 16, 1949 (age 77); Houston, Texas, U.S.
- Listed height: 6 ft 3 in (1.91 m)
- Listed weight: 240 lb (109 kg)

Career information
- High school: Jones (Houston)
- College: Texas
- NFL draft: 1971: 2nd round, 52nd overall pick

Career history
- Baltimore Colts (1971)*; New England Patriots (1971); St. Louis Cardinals (1972)*; New York Jets (1973)*
- * Offseason or practice squad member only

Awards and highlights
- 2× National champion (1969, 1970); Consensus All-American (1970); Second-team All-American (1969); 2× First-team All-SWC (1969, 1970)
- Stats at Pro Football Reference

William James Atessis (born July 16, 1949) is an American former professional football player who was a defensive end in the National Football League (NFL). He played college football for the Texas Longhorns, who won two NCAA national championships. He was a three-year starter and was a second-team All-American as a junior and a consensus All-American as a senior. He currently resides in Houston, Texas.

== Early life ==
Atessis graduated from Jesse Jones High School, in Houston where he played baseball and basketball in addition to football. He was a Texas All-State tackle in 1966 and Atessis was the state's number one lineman in the recruiting class of 1967.

He was inducted to the Texas High School Football Hall of Fame in 1995.

== College career ==
Atessis was a three-year letterman and three-year starter at left defensive end at Texas from 1968 through the 1970 season. He was a member of teams which set a school record 30-game winning streak that currently stands as the twelfth-longest in NCAA history. He was a starter on the back-to-back National Champion Texas Longhorns teams of 1969 and 1970, and he played in the so-called "Game of the Century" in 1969. He was voted Longhorn Defensive MVP by the Dallas Morning News and Houston Post both in 1969 and 1970.

The Longhorns won three consecutive Southwest Conference championships and appeared in three consecutive Cotton Bowl Classic games, winning two during that time, while he was on the team.

He was a consensus 1st Team All-American in 1970 and was second-team All-American in 1969. In 1970 he was voted Southwest Conference Co-Lineman of the Year. He was a consensus All-SWC choice in 1969 and 1970. He was also a finalist for the Outland Trophy and finished fifth in the voting for the UPI Lineman of the Year, both in 1970.

Atessis played in the Senior Bowl in Mobile, Alabama in January 1971 and in the Coaches All-America game in Lubbock, Texas on June 26, 1971, where he won the player of the game award.

He was voted into the University of Texas Men's Athletics Hall of Honor in 2001; Texas Coach Darrell Royal called him a "[s]uper player, who hasn't played a bad game in three years." was named to the All-Time University of Texas team by the Austin American-Statesman and the Red River Rivalry all-time team by the Fort Worth Star-Telegram in 2005 and was named number 16 on a list of the 50 best players in Texas Longhorn history in 2006.

== Professional career ==
Atessis was selected by the Baltimore Colts in the second round, with the 52nd overall pick, of the 1971 NFL draft. Worried that he wasn't strong enough for the defensive line, the Colts moved him to linebacker. He later suffered a knee injury in training camp and, after some time on the "band squad" was waived early in the season.

In November of the 1971 season he was picked up by the New England Patriots, who moved him back to defensive end and he played in five games for the team.

In 1972, Atessis was asked to drop weight and moved to outside Linebacker. He left the Patriots training camp early with an injured heal and was traded to the St. Louis Cardinals for an undisclosed 1973 draft pick a few days later. The Cardinals moved him to the offensive line and he tried to gain back the weight he lost to play linebacker. He was placed on the injured reserve list shortly thereafter and released from the team in September.

In 1973 he was signed by the New York Jets, but was dropped in early August.
