= Gary Hammond =

American football player (born 1949)

No. 30
- Positions: Wide receiver, running back

Personal information
- Born: July 31, 1949 (age 77); Port Arthur, Texas, U.S.
- Listed height: 5 ft 11 in (1.80 m)
- Listed weight: 184 lb (83 kg)

Career information
- High school: Thomas Jefferson
- College: SMU
- NFL draft: 1972: 3rd round, 66th overall pick

Career history
- New York Jets (1972)*; St. Louis Cardinals (1973–1976)
- * Offseason or practice squad member only

Awards and highlights
- First-team All-SWC (1969); Second-team All-SWC (1970)

Career NFL statistics
- Games played: 49
- Stats at Pro Football Reference

Gary Allen Hammond (born July 31, 1949) is an American former professional football player who was a wide receiver and running back in the National Football League (NFL) who played for the St. Louis Cardinals. He played college football for the SMU Mustangs.

== Early life ==
Hammond attended Thomas Jefferson High School in Port Arthur, Texas, where his father encouraged him to play multiple sports. Hammond was a second-team All-State quarterback in 1967 and a high school All-American in 1968.

== College career ==
Hammond was heavily recruited by Texas and Texas A&M, but chose to attend SMU because he was Methodist. He played wide receiver, running back and quarterback and was a three-year letterman. He was named All-Southwestern Conference at wide receiver as a sophomore and as running back his junior season. He led the conference in receiving in both 1969 and 1970. Hammond was moved to quarterback his senior season in 1971 and was named the conference's Player of the Year. He also received the Kern Tips Memorial Trophy and the Ray McColloch Sportsmanship Award that year.

== Professional career ==
Hammond's versatility in college caught the attention of pro scouts. In 1972, he was selected by the New York Jets in the third round of the 1972 NFL draft. He played some quarterback and receiver in training camp, but missed the regular season after suffering a knee injury.

In 1973, Hammond was claimed by the St. Louis Cardinals just before the final preseason game. Cardinals head coach Don Coryell remembered seeing Hammond at a college all-star game where he was named player of the game while playing both quarterback and wide receiver. Hammond served the Cardinals as a running back, receiver, special teams performer, and even played some safety. His most memorable play came in 1974 when he took a lateral from Jim Hart and hurled an 81-yard pass to Jackie Smith to help the Cardinals to a 31-28 win over the Dallas Cowboys. It was the longest pass in the NFC that season and the longest catch of Smith's career.

Injuries forced Hammond into retirement after the 1976 season.

== Awards and legacy ==
Hammond is a member of the SMU Hall of Fame and received the SMU Alumni Association Leadership Award in 1969, 1970, and 1971. He was NFL Alumni Association President from 1986–87 and in 1992 received the NFL Alumni Legends Award. He is enshrined in the Museum of the Gulf Coast-Sports Hall of Fame.
