= 1969 All-Southwest Conference football team =

American college football all-star team

The 1969 All-Southwest Conference football team consists of American football players chosen by various organizations for All-Southwest Conference teams for the 1969 NCAA University Division football season. The selectors for the 1969 season included the Associated Press (AP) and United Press International (UPI).

== All Southwest selections ==
=== Offense ===
==== Quarterbacks ====
- Chuck Hixson, SMU (AP-1)
- James Street, Texas (AP-2; UPI-1)

==== Halfbacks ====
- Bill Burnett, Arkansas (AP-1; UPI-1)
- Jim Bertelsen, Texas (AP-1)
- Larry Stegent, Texas A&M (AP-1)
- Norm Bulaich, TCU (AP-2)
- Bruce Maxwell, Arkansas (AP-2)
- Ted Koy, Texas (AP-2)

==== Fullbacks ====
- Steve Worster, Texas (AP-1; UPI-1)

==== Wide receivers ====
- Gary Hammond, SMU (AP-1; UPI-1)
- Cotton Speyrer, Texas (AP-1; UPI-1)
- Chuck Dicus, Arkansas (AP-2; UPI-1)

==== Tight ends ====
- Ross Brupbacher, Texas A&M (AP-1)
- Ken Fleming, SMU (AP-2)

==== Tackles ====
- Bob McKay, Texas (AP-1; UPI-1)
- Bobby Wuensch, Texas (AP-1; UPI-1)
- Bill Jackson, SMU (AP-2)
- Bill James, SMU (AP-2)

==== Guards ====
- Jerry Dossey, Arkansas (AP-1; UPI-1)
- James Ray, TCU (AP-1)
- Ronnie Hammers, Arkansas (AP-2)
- Leonard Forey, Texas A&M (AP-2)

==== Centers ====
- Rodney Brand, Arkansas (AP-1; UPI-1)
- Forrest Wiegand, Texas (AP-2)

=== Defense ===
==== Defensive ends ====
- Bill Atessis, Texas (AP-1; UPI-1)
- Mike DeNiro, Texas A&M (AP-1; UPI-1)
- Richard Campbell, Texas Tech (AP-1)
- Bruce James, Arkansas (AP-2)
- Rodrigo Barnes, Rice (AP-2)

==== Defensive tackles ====
- Lynn Odom, Texas A&M (AP-1; UPI-1)
- Rick Kersey, Arkansas (AP-1)
- Leo Brooks, Texas (UPI-1)
- Roger Roitsch, Rice (UPI-1)
- Tom Reaux, Baylor (AP-2)
- Dick Bumpas, Arkansas (AP-2)

==== Linebackers ====
- Glen Halsell, Texas (AP-1; UPI-1)
- Cliff Powell, Arkansas (AP-1; UPI-1)
- Bruce Portillo, SMU (AP-1; UPI-1)
- Andy Durrett, TCU (AP-2)
- Scott Henderson, Texas (AP-2)
- Joe Stutts, SMU (AP-2)

==== Defensive backs ====
- Denton Fox, Texas Tech (AP-1; UPI-1)
- Terry Stewart, Arkansas (AP-1; UPI-1)
- Dave Elmendorf, Texas A&M (AP-1; UPI-1) (CFHOF)
- Pat Curry, SMU (AP-1)
- Tom Campbell, Texas (AP-2)
- Jack Faubion, Rice (AP-2)
- Freddie Joe Steinmark, Texas (AP-2)
- Jerry Moore, Arkansas (AP-2)

=== Kicking specialists ===
- Jerry Don Sanders, Texas Tech (AP-1) (placekicker)
- Ed Marsh, Baylor (AP-1) (punter)

== Key ==
AP = Associated Press

UPI = United Press International

CFHOF = Player inducted into the College Football Hall of Fame

== See also ==
- 1969 College Football All-America Team
