= 1970 All-Southwest Conference football team =

American college football all-star team

The 1970 All-Southwest Conference football team consists of American football players chosen by various organizations for All-Southwest Conference teams for the 1970 NCAA University Division football season. The selectors for the 1970 season included the Associated Press (AP) and the United Press (UP). Players selected as first-team players by both the AP and UP are designated in bold.

== All Southwest selections ==
=== Offense ===
==== Split ends ====
- Chuck Dicus, Arkansas (AP-1)
- Cotton Speyrer, Texas (AP-2)

==== Flankers ====
- Derek Davis, Baylor (AP-1)
- Johnny Odom, Texas Tech (AP-2)

==== Tackles ====
- Bobby Wuensch, Texas (AP-1)
- Bill Jackson, SMU (AP-1)
- Mike Nelson, Arkansas (AP-2)
- Ron Evans, Baylor (AP-2)

==== Guards ====
- Ronnie Hammers, Arkansas (AP-1)
- Bobby Mitchell, Texas (AP-1)

==== Tight ends ====
- Pat Morrison, Arkansas (AP-1)

==== Centers ====
- John Ruthstrom, Texas Christian (AP-1)
- Jesse Richardson, Texas Tech (AP-2)

==== Quarterbacks ====
- Bill Montgomery, Arkansas (AP-1)
- Eddie Phillips, Texas (AP-2)

==== Fullbacks ====
- Steve Worster, Texas (AP-1)
- Doug McCutcheon, Texas Tech (AP-2)

==== Tailbacks ====
- Bill Burnett, Arkansas (AP-1)
- Gary Hammond, SMU (AP-2)

=== Defense ===
==== Defensive ends ====
- Bill Atessis, Texas (AP-1)
- Bruce Dowdy, Texas Tech (AP-1)
- Bruce James, Arkansas (AP-2)
- Roger Goree, Baylor (AP-2)

==== Defensive tackles ====
- Dick Bumpas, Arkansas (AP-1)
- Wayne McDermand, Texas Tech (AP-1)
- Larry Dibbles, TCU (AP-2)
- Rick Kersey, Arkansas (AP-2)

==== Middle guards ====
- Roger Roitsch, Rice (AP-1)

==== Linebackers ====
- Scott Henderson, Texas (AP-1)
- Mike Boschetti, Arkansas (AP-1)
- David Jones, Baylor (AP-1)
- Joe Stutts, SMU (AP-2)
- Larry Molinare, Texas Tech (AP-2)
- Stan Mauldin, Texas (AP-2)

==== Defensive backs ====
- Bucky Allhouse, Rice (AP-1)
- Ken Perkins, Texas Tech (AP-1)
- Dave Elmendorf, Texas A&M (AP-1)
- Jerry Moore, Arkansas (AP-1)
- Pat Curry, SMU (AP-2)
- Dale Rebold, Texas Tech (AP-2)
- Mike Tyler, Rice (AP-2)
- Ed Marsh, Baylor (AP-2)

== Key ==
AP = Associated Press

== See also ==
- 1970 College Football All-America Team
