= Bobby Wuensch =

American football player (born 1947)

Profile
- Position: Tackle

Personal information
- Born: November 1, 1947
- Died: January 19, 2025 (aged 77)

Career information
- College: Texas

Awards and highlights
- 2× National champion (1969, 1970); Consensus All-American (1970); First-team All-American (1969); 2× First-team All-SWC (1969, 1970); Named to Cotton Bowl and SWC All-Decade teams of 1970s; Played in 1971 Hula Bowl and Coaches All-America Game; Inducted into the University of Texas Football Hall of Honor in 1990

Bobby Wuensch (November 1, 1947 – January 19, 2025) was an American football offensive lineman. He played for the Texas Longhorns, anchoring their best offensive line in 1968–1970 as a consensus All-American. Wuensch was a captain of the National Champion 1969 Texas Longhorns football team.

Wuensch was selected by the Baltimore Colts in the 12th round, 294th overall, in the 1971 NFL draft, but suffered a career-ending injury in the first season.

Wuensch died in League City, Texas, on January 19, 2025.
