= 1970 All-America college football team =

Official list of the best college football players of 1970

The 1970 All-America college football team is composed of college football players who were selected as All-Americans by various organizations and writers that chose College Football All-America Teams in 1970. The National Collegiate Athletic Association (NCAA) recognizes six selectors as "official" for the 1970 season. They are: (1) the American Football Coaches Association (AFCA), (2) the Associated Press (AP), (3) the Central Press Association (CP), (4) Football Writers Association of America (FWAA), (5) the Newspaper Enterprise Association (NEA), and (6) the United Press International (UPI).

AP, UPI, NEA, and Central Press were all press organizations that polled writers and players. FWAA was also a poll of writers, as was the Walter Camp Foundation. The AFCA was a poll of college coaches. The Sporting News and Time polled football scouts and coaches. AP, UPI, NEA, Central Press, and The Sporting News chose both first and second teams. AP, UPI, NEA, and Central Press also listed numerous honorable mentions.

== Consensus All-Americans ==
The following chart identifies the NCAA-recognized consensus All-Americans for the year 1970 and displays which first-team designations they received.

Name	Position	School	Number	Official selectors	Other selectors
Jack Tatum	Defensive back	Ohio State	6/5/11	AFCA, AP, CP, FWAA, NEA, UPI	FN, PFW, Time, TSN, WC
Bill Atessis	Defensive end	Texas	5/4/9	AFCA, AP, CP, NEA, UPI	FN, PFW, Time, TSN
Dan Dierdorf	Offensive tackle	Michigan	5/4/9	AFCA, AP, FWAA, NEA, UPI	FN, PFW, Time, WC
Steve Worster	Running back	Texas	5/4/9	AFCA, AP, FWAA, NEA, UPI	FN, Time, TSN, WC
Jim Plunkett	Quarterback	Stanford	5/4/9	AFCA, CP, FWAA, NEA, UPI	FN, Time, TSN, WC
Larry Willingham	Defensive back	Auburn	4/5/9	AFCA, CP, FWAA, NEA	FN, PFW, Time, TSN, WC
Chip Kell	Offensive guard	Tennessee	6/2/8	AFCA, AP, CP, FWAA, NEA, UPI	FN, WC
Jim Stillwagon	Middle guard	Ohio State	6/2/8	AFCA, AP, CP, FWAA, NEA, UPI	FN, WC
Rock Perdoni	Defensive tackle	Georgia Tech	5/3/8	AFCA, AP, CP, FWAA, UPI	FN, TSN, WC
Tom Gatewood	End	Notre Dame	5/2/7	AFCA, CP, FWAA, NEA, UPI	FN, WC
Don Popplewell	Center	Colorado	5/2/7	AP, CP, FWAA, NEA, UPI	FN, WC
Larry DiNardo	Offensive guard	Notre Dame	4/3/7	AP, CP, FWAA, UPI	FN, TSN, WC
Charlie Weaver	Defensive end	USC	4/3/7	AFCA, AP, FWAA, UPI	FN, Time, WC
Elmo Wright	End	Houston	3/4/7	AP, FWAA, NEA	FN, PFW, Time, TSN
Ernie Jennings	End	Air Force	5/1/6	AFCA, AP, CP, FWAA, UPI	FN
Mike Anderson	Linebacker	LSU	5/1/6	AFCA, AP, CP, FWAA, UPI	FN
Don McCauley	Running back	North Carolina	4/2/6	AFCA, AP, CP, FWAA	FN, WC
Bobby Wuensch	Offensive tackle	Texas	4/2/6	AFCA, CP, NEA, UPI	FN, WC
Bob Newton	Offensive tackle	Nebraska	4/1/5	AFCA, AP, CP, FWAA	FN
Dick Bumpas	Defensive tackle	Arkansas	2/0/2	AP, NEA	--
Tommy Casanova	Defensive back	LSU	2/0/2	AFCA, AP	--
Dave Elmendorf	Defensive back	Texas A&M	2/0/2	AP, FWAA	--

== Offense ==
=== Ends ===
- Tom Gatewood, Notre Dame (AFCA, CP-1 [end], FWAA [end], NEA-1, UPI-1 [end], FN, WC)
- Elmo Wright, Houston (AP-1, FWAA [end], NEA-1, UPI-2 [end], FN, PFW, Time, TSN)
- Ernie Jennings, Air Force (AFCA, AP-1, CP-1 [end], FWAA [flanker], NEA-2, UPI-1 [end], FN)
- Chuck Dicus, Arkansas (AFCA, CP-2 [end], NEA-2, FN, WC)
- J. D. Hill, Arizona State (PFW, Time, TSN)
- Terry Beasley, Auburn (AP-2, CP-2 [end], NEA-2 [tight end], UPI-2 [end], FN)
- Cotton Speyrer, Texas (WC)
- Bob Newland, Oregon (AP-2)

=== Tight ends ===
- Jan White, Ohio State (NEA-1, Time, TSN)
- Jim Braxton, West Virginia (AP-1)
- Larry Brown, Kansas (PFW)
- Bob Moore, Stanford (AP-2)

=== Tackles ===
- Dan Dierdorf, Michigan (AFCA, AP-1, CP-2, FWAA, NEA-1, UPI-1, FN, PFW, Time, WC)
- Bobby Wuensch, Texas (AFCA, AP-2, CP-1, NEA-1, UPI-1, FN, WC)
- Bob Newton, Nebraska (AFCA, AP-1, CP-1, FWAA, NEA-2 [guard], UPI-2, FN)
- Vernon Holland, Tenn State (PFW, Time, TSN)
- Marv Montgomery, USC (Time, TSN)
- Larron "Larry" Jackson, Missouri (AP-2, NEA-2, UPI-2)
- Worthy McClure, Mississippi (CP-2, NEA-2)

=== Guards ===
- Chip Kell, Tennessee (AFCA, AP-1, CP-1, FWAA, NEA-1, UPI, FN, WC)
- Larry DiNardo, Notre Dame (AP-1, CP-1, FWAA, NEA-2, UPI, FN, TSN, WC)
- Hank Allison, San Diego St. (AP-2, NEA-1, PFW, Time, TSN)
- Mike Sikich, Northwestern (CP-2, UPI-2)
- Gary Venturo, Arizona St. (CP-2, UPI-2)

=== Centers ===
- Don Popplewell, Colorado (AP-1, CP-1, FWAA, NEA-1, UPI, FN, WC)
- Dave Thompson, Clemson (PFW, Time, TSN, AP-2)
- Wimpy Winther, Mississippi (PFW)
- John Sande, Stanford (NEA-2, UPI-2)
- Bob Herb, William & Mary (AP-2)
- Tommy Lyons, Georgia (CP-2)

=== Quarterbacks ===
- Jim Plunkett, Stanford (AFCA, AP-2, CP-1, FWAA, NEA-1, UPI, FN, Time, TSN, WC)
- Joe Theismann, Notre Dame (AP-1, CP-2, NEA-2, UPI-2, FN)

=== Running backs ===
- Steve Worster, Texas (AFCA, AP-1, CP-2 [fullback], FWAA, NEA-1, UPI, FN, Time, TSN, WC)
- Don McCauley, North Carolina (AFCA, AP-1, CP-1, FWAA, UPI-2, FN, WC)
- John Brockington, Ohio State (AP-2, CP-1 [fullback], NEA-2, UPI-1, FN, PFW, Time, TSN)
- Ed Marinaro, Cornell (AP-2, CP-1, UPI-1, FN)
- Leon Burns, Long Beach St. (NEA-1, PFW)
- Johnny Musso, Alabama (CP-2, FN, WC)
- Willie Armstrong, Grambling (PFW)
- Mike Adamle, Northwestern (UPI-2, FN)
- Leo Hayden, Ohio State (PFW)
- Vince Clements, Connecticut (NEA-2)
- Joe Moore, Missouri (UPI-2)
- Joe Orduna, Nebraska (CP-2)

== Defense ==
=== Ends ===
- Bill Atessis, Texas (AFCA, AP-1, CP-1, NEA-1, UPI-1, FN, PFW, Time, TSN)
- Charlie Weaver, USC (AFCA, AP-1, CP-2, FWAA, NEA-2, UPI-1, FN, Time, WC)
- Jack Youngblood, Florida (AP-2, CP-1, FWAA, UPI-2, FN, PFW, Time, TSN, WC)
- Richard Harris, Grambling (PFW, Time, TSN)
- Tody Smith, USC (PFW, Time)
- Herb Orvis, Colorado (AP-2, NEA-2, UPI-2)
- Mike Kuhn, Kansas St. (CP-2)

=== Tackles ===
- Rock Perdoni, Georgia Tech (AFCA, AP-1, CP-1, FWAA, NEA-2, UPI-1, FN, TSN, WC)
- Dick Bumpas, Arkansas (AP-1, NEA-1 [end])
- Tom Neville, Yale (CP-2, WC)
- Bruce James, Arkansas (FWAA)
- Joe Ehrmann, Syracuse (UPI-1)
- Jim Poston, South Carolina (CP-1)
- Win Headley, Wake Forest (NEA-1)
- Mel Long, Toledo (NEA-1)
- David Rolley, Kentucky (NEA-2)
- Dave Walline, Nebraska (UPI-2)
- Today Smith, USC (UPI-2)
- Craig Hanneman, Oregon St. (AP-2)
- John Sage, LSU (AP-2)
- Bob Bell, Cincinnati (CP-2)

=== Middle guards ===
- Jim Stillwagon, Ohio State (AFCA, AP-1, CP-1 [guard], FWAA, NEA-1, UPI-1 [linebacker], FN, WC)
- Henry Hill, Michigan (AP-2 [guard], CP-1 [guard], NEA-2 [MG])
- George Smith, Nebraska (CP-2 [guard])
- Roger Roitsch, Rice (CP-2 [guard])

=== Linebackers ===
- Jack Ham, Penn State (AFCA, AP-1, CP-2, FWAA, NEA-1, UPI-1, FN, PFW, Time, TSN, WC)
- Mike Anderson, LSU (AFCA, AP-1, CP-1, FWAA, NEA-2, UPI-1, FN)
- Isiah Robertson, Southern University (Time, TSN)
- Jerry Murtaugh, Nebraska (AP-1, CP-2, UPI-2, FN, WC)
- Jackie Walker, Tennessee (AP-2, NEA-1, UPI-2, FN)
- Dale Farley, West Virginia (PFW, TSN)
- Marty Huff, Michigan (AFCA, UPI-2)
- Scott Henderson, Texas (CP-1)
- Richard Slough, USC (PFW)
- Charlie Hall, Houston (NEA-2)
- Phil Croyle, California (AP-2)
- Rick Kingrea, Tulane (AP-2)

=== Backs ===
- Jack Tatum, Ohio State (AFCA, AP-1, CP-1, FWAA, NEA-1, UPI-1, FN, PFW, Time, TSN, WC)
- Larry Willingham, Auburn (AFCA, CP-1, FWAA, NEA-1 [linebacker], FN, PFW, Time, TSN, WC)
- Dave Elmendorf, Texas A&M (AP-1, FWAA [safety], NEA-2 [linebacker], UPI-2)
- Tommy Casanova, LSU (AFCA, AP-1, CP-2, UPI-2)
- Clarence Scott, Kansas State (FWAA, NEA-2, PFW, Time, TSN)
- Dickie Harris, South Carolina (AFCA, CP-2, NEA-1, FN)
- Mike Sensibaugh, Ohio State (AP-2, CP [safety], UPI-1)
- Tim Anderson, Ohio State (NEA-2, Time, TSN)
- Clarence Ellis, Notre Dame (NEA-1, UPI-1)
- Murry Bowden, Dartmouth (AFCA, WC)
- Pat Murphy, Colorado (WC)
- Bivian Lee, Prairie View (PFW)
- Jerry Moore, Arkansas (PFW, NEA-2, TSN-2)
- Bobby Majors, Tennessee (UPI-2)
- Windlan Hall, Arizona St. (UPI-2)
- Dick Adams, Miami (AP-2)
- Norm Thompson, Utah (AP-2)
- Tim Priest, Tennessee (CP-2)

== Special teams ==
=== Kickers ===
- Happy Feller, Texas (PFW, TSN)
- Bill McClard, Arkansas (AFCA)

=== Punters ===
- Marv Bateman, Utah (FWAA [kicker], TSN)
- Jim McCann, Arizona State (PFW)

== Key ==
- **Bold** – Consensus All-American
- -1 – First-team selection
- -2 – Second-team selection
- -3 – Third-team selection

=== Official selectors ===
- AFCA – American Football Coaches Association
- AP – Associated Press
- CP – Central Press Association
- FWAA – Football Writers Association of America
- NEA – Newspaper Enterprise Association
- UPI – United Press International

=== Other selectors ===
- FN – Football News
- PFW – Pro Football Weekly
- Time – Time magazine
- TSN – The Sporting News
- WC – Walter Camp Football Foundation

== See also ==
- 1970 All-Atlantic Coast Conference football team
- 1970 All-Big Eight Conference football team
- 1970 All-Big Ten Conference football team
- 1970 All-Pacific-8 Conference football team
- 1970 All-SEC football team
- 1970 All-Southwest Conference football team
