= Dave Elmendorf =

American football player (born 1949)

No. 42
- Position: Safety

Personal information
- Born: June 20, 1949 (age 77); San Antonio, Texas, U.S.
- Listed height: 6 ft 1 in (1.85 m)
- Listed weight: 195 lb (88 kg)

Career information
- High school: Westbury (Houston, Texas)
- College: Texas A&M
- NFL draft: 1971: 3rd round, 63rd overall pick

Career history
- Los Angeles Rams (1971–1979)

Awards and highlights
- Second-team All-Pro (1975); All-Rookie (1971); Consensus All-American (1970); 2× First-team All-SWC (1969, 1970)

Career NFL statistics
- Interceptions: 27
- Fumble recoveries: 11
- Defensive touchdowns: 2
- Stats at Pro Football Reference
- College Football Hall of Fame

David Cole Elmendorf (born June 20, 1949) is an American former professional football player who was a safety for nine seasons in the National Football League (NFL). He was a part of the Los Angeles Rams Super Bowl XIV team. In 1997, he was inducted into the College Football Hall of Fame.

David attended and graduated, in 1967, from Westbury High School in Houston, Texas. He was a star football running back and baseball player. Dave played his college ball at Texas A&M University, class of 1971. Elmendorf was a 1970 All-America in football and was a twice all-American center fielder on the baseball team and was safety, kick returner and occasional tailback on the football team. He was a straight-A student, with a major in economics. He also was named Academic All-America and won a graduate scholarship from the National Football Foundation. He was selected in the 1971 MLB draft by the New York Yankees but chose to play football for the Los Angeles Rams. He was selected 63rd overall in the third round of the 1971 NFL draft.

Elmendorf was a starter as a rookie for the 1971 Los Angeles Rams, making the All-rookie team. In 1973, he was voted the Rams "Outstanding Defensive Back", an honor he repeated in 1974. Also, in 1974 he intercepted a career-high 7 passes, returning two for touchdowns and was named All-NFC by AP. In 1975, he was a Second-team All-Pro by the AP and NEA and was Second-team All-NFC by UPI. In his nine NFL seasons Elmendorf played in 130 games, starting all 130, and intercepted 27 passes and recovered 10 fumbles.

After the NFL, he became a broadcaster on radio and TV, became a director of course acquisition for the American Golf Corporation, and in 1989 became general manager of Bear Creek Golf Club in Houston, Texas. In 2007, he was color commentator for the Texas A&M football radio broadcasts as well as being involved in other business enterprises. In 2008, he was named general manager of the Quail Valley Golf Course, located in the Quail Valley subdivision of Missouri City, Texas.

Elmendorf is regarded as one of the top two-sport athletes in A&M annals for baseball and football and has been nominated for numerous broadcast honors.
