= Jim Files =

American football player (born 1948)

No. 58
- Position: Linebacker

Personal information
- Born: January 16, 1948 (age 78); Paris, Arkansas, U.S.
- Listed height: 6 ft 4 in (1.93 m)
- Listed weight: 240 lb (109 kg)

Career information
- High school: Southside (AR)
- College: Oklahoma
- NFL draft: 1970: 1st round, 13th overall pick

Career history
- New York Giants (1970–1973)

Awards and highlights
- Second-team All-Big Eight (1969)

Career NFL statistics
- Interceptions: 5
- Fumble recoveries: 5
- Touchdowns: 1
- Stats at Pro Football Reference

Jimmie Dale Files (born January 16, 1948) is an American former professional football player who was a linebacker in the National Football League (NFL). He was selected by the New York Giants 13th overall in the 1970 NFL draft. He played college football for the Oklahoma Sooners.
