= Thom Gatewood =

American football player (born 1950)

No. 83
- Positions: Tight end, wide receiver

Personal information
- Born: March 7, 1950 (age 76); Baltimore, Maryland, U.S.
- Listed height: 6 ft 3 in (1.91 m)
- Listed weight: 215 lb (98 kg)

Career information
- High school: Baltimore City College
- College: Notre Dame (1968–1971)
- NFL draft: 1972: 5th round, 107th overall pick

Career history
- New York Giants (1972–1973)

Awards and highlights
- Consensus All-America (1970); Second-team All-American (1971)

Career NFL statistics
- Games played: 17
- Stats at Pro Football Reference
- College Football Hall of Fame

Thomas Gatewood Jr. (born March 7, 1950) is an American former professional football player who was a wide receiver in the National Football League (NFL). He was selected by the New York Giants in the fifth round of the 1972 NFL draft. He played college football for the Notre Dame Fighting Irish.

== Early life ==
Gatewood grew up in Baltimore. He was second of Thomas and Wilhelmina’s six children. He attended Baltimore City Public Schools where he was a straight-A student. Unbeknownst to his parents, who emphasized academics, he played football in high school at Baltimore City College where he started as a sophomore on a junior varsity that was undefeated and unscored upon. He then started at wide receiver/tight end in both his junior and senior years. He was coached by George Young, who later became the General Manager of the New York Giants. His teams won championships both years and he was recruited by dozens of schools.

== College career ==
While at Notre Dame, Gatewood set many receiving records, many of which were not broken until at least 30 years later. During his career he had 157 receptions for 2,283 yards and 19 touchdowns. In 1970, he was a consensus All-American after a then school record 77 receptions for 1,123 yards. The record was broken in 2006 by Jeff Samardzija who had 78. His 157 career receptions were also a record until 2006 when both Samardzija and Rhema McKnight broke it. Gatewood still holds the record for the most catches per game in a season with 7.7. Gatewood was the first African-American captain at Notre Dame.

== Professional career ==
Gatewood was selected 107th overall by the New York Giants in the fifth round of the 1972 NFL draft. He played in seventeen games over two seasons, recording no receptions.

== College Football Hall of Fame ==
On January 9, 2015, the National Football Foundation announced that Gatewood would be inducted into the College Football Hall of Fame later that year.

== Personal life ==
His grandson, A. J. Dillon, is an American football running back for the Carolina Panthers. He played college football for the Boston College Eagles.
