= Linzy Cole =

American football player (1948–2016)

No. 25, 87, 26, 21
- Position: Wide receiver

Personal information
- Born: April 21, 1948; Dallas, Texas, U.S.
- Died: September 21, 2016 (aged 68); Dallas, Texas, U.S.
- Listed height: 5 ft 11 in (1.80 m)
- Listed weight: 172 lb (78 kg)

Career information
- High school: James Madison (TX)
- College: TCU
- NFL draft: 1970: 9th round, 210th overall pick

Career history
- Chicago Bears (1970); Houston Oilers (1971–1972); Buffalo Bills (1972)

Career NFL statistics
- Receptions: 3
- Receiving yards: 47
- Return yards: 1,515
- Stats at Pro Football Reference

Linzy Cole (April 21, 1948 – September 21, 2016) was an American professional football player who was a wide receiver for three seasons in the National Football League (NFL) for the Chicago Bears, Houston Oilers and Buffalo Bills. He played in a total of 31 career games. Cole was the first black football player at TCU. At TCU, he was a First-Team All-SWC selection and the Rogers Trophy award winner. He is TCU leader in career return average in a season. He closed out his career playing in the 1969 Blue-Grey game.
