= Jerry Don Sanders =

American football player and coach (born 1948)

Biographical details
- Born: February 24, 1948 (age 78); Littlefield, Texas, U.S.

Playing career
- 1967–1969: Texas Tech
- Position: Placekicker

Coaching career (HC unless noted)
- 1979–1980: Lubbock Christian

Head coaching record
- Overall: 0–16 (Note: Does not include exhibition victory vs. Saltillo University.)

Accomplishments and honors

Awards
- First-team All-SWC (1969)

Jerry Don Sanders (born February 24, 1948) is an American former college football coach and player. Sanders was a placekicker for the Texas Tech Red Raiders for three seasons, and in selected to play in the 1970 Blue–Gray Football Classic. The Cleveland Browns drafted Sanders in the 12th round of the 1970 NFL draft. Sanders went on to serve as head coach of the inaugural Lubbock Christian Chaparrals, but compiled a record of 0–16 for the 1979 and 1980 seasons.

== Head coaching record ==
Year	Team	Overall	Conference	Standing	Bowl/playoffs
Lubbock Christian Chaparrals (Texas Intercollegiate Athletic Association) (1979–1980)
1979	Lubbock Christian	0–8	0–0	NA	
1980	Lubbock Christian	0–10	0–10	6th	
Lubbock Christian:		0–18	0–10		
Total:		0–18			
