= Bill Montgomery (quarterback) =

American football player (born 1949)

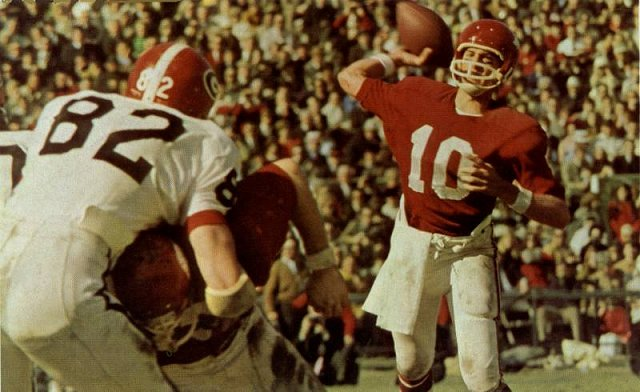
- Montgomery against Georgia in the 1969 Sugar Bowl

No. 10
- Position: Quarterback

Personal information
- Born: January 2, 1949 (age 77)

Career information
- High school: R. L. Turner (Carrollton, Texas)
- College: Arkansas (1968–1970)

Awards and highlights
- First-team All-SWC (1970); Arkansas Sports Hall of Fame; Southwest Conference Hall of Fame

William Acker Montgomery (born January 2, 1949) is an American former football player for The University of Arkansas and a member of the Arkansas Sports Hall of Fame, The University of Arkansas All-Century Team, The University of Arkansas Sports Hall of Honor, and the SEC Football Legends. He is married to his wife Susan Byrne Montgomery and has four sons.

== High school ==
Montgomery attended R.L. Turner High School in Carrollton, Texas, where he participated in every sport and became student body president. His personality was that of someone who carried himself with confidence. His choices for which college to play football came down Arkansas, Texas, or Alabama. He ultimately choose Arkansas and went on to have a successful collegiate career.

== College career ==
After graduating from R.L. Turner High School in Carrollton, Texas, Montgomery was the starting quarterback for the Arkansas Razorbacks in 1968, 1969 and 1970. At the conclusion of his career at Arkansas, he held virtually every school passing record, including career touchdown passes (29), career passing yards (4590), single season passing yards (1662), single game passing yards (338), career completion percentage (.560), career total offense (5052 yd.), single season total offense (1834 yd.), single game total offense (360 yd.), career passing attempts (602), single season passing attempts (234), career completions (337), single season completions (134), career completion percentage (.560) and single game completion percentage (.800).

The Razorbacks went 28–5 in three seasons with Montgomery as the quarterback, the highest winning percentage (.875) in the school's history over any three-year period. In 1968, Montgomery led Arkansas to a share of the Southwest Conference title and finished the season by winning the 1969 Sugar Bowl.

In 1969, Montgomery played in The Big Shootout, a game in which #1-ranked Texas beat #2-ranked Arkansas, 15–14. He was selected All-Southwest Conference in 1970. In 2015 Montgomery was inducted into the Southwest Conference Hall of Fame.

== Life after football ==
After football, Montgomery began an investment career starting in New York before settling in Dallas, Texas. He continues to support the University of Arkansas through financial and advisory contributions. He and his wife Susan have four sons. He currently works and lives in Dallas Texas.
