= Larry DiNardo =

American football player (born 1949)

Profile
- Position: G

Personal information
- Born: August 18, 1949 (age 77)
- Listed height: 6 ft 1 in (1.85 m)
- Listed weight: 235 lb (107 kg)

Career information
- High school: St. Francis Preparatory School
- College: University of Notre Dame

Career history
- 1968–1970: Notre Dame

Awards and highlights
- Consensus All-American (1970); First-team All-American (1969)

Lawrence C. DiNardo (born August 18, 1949) is an American former professional football guard who played for the Notre Dame Fighting Irish football team of the University of Notre Dame, and was recognized as a consensus All-American in 1970. After college, he practiced law in Chicago.

== Early life ==
DiNardo a native of Howard Beach, Queens, is the older brother of college football coach Gerry DiNardo. He attended St. Francis Preparatory School in Fresh Meadows neighborhood in New York City borough of Queens where he graduated as valedictorian in 1967.

== Playing career ==
DiNardo played for the Notre Dame Fighting Irish football team under coach Ara Parseghian during the 1968, 1969 and 1970 seasons. Following his senior year, as a 6-foot, 1-inch, 235-pound guard, he was recognized as a consensus first-team All-American, having received first-team honors from several publications and organizations including the Associated Press (AP), and United Press International (UPI). That year, he was a co-captain and helped the Fighting Irish to set a then all-time school record of 510.5 yards per game for total offense.

DiNardo ran into some controversy after returning home from an NCAA-sponsored trip to boost the troop morale during the Vietnam War. In an interview he called the war "a total waste." Later he told a reporter with Sports Illustrated that he was conservative and did not want to be "a hero of the new left." He also added he didn't think his comment was that controversial, saying "I mean, who's not against the war?"

== After college football ==
DiNardo was drafted by the New Orleans Saints in the seventh round (158 overall selection) of the 1971 NFL draft. He played in 5 preseason games before getting cut. Instead of trying to make another team, he chose to return to Notre Dame and enter law school. He graduated in 1974 began practicing law in South Bend, Indiana. Later he joined the firm of Seyfarth, Shaw and Fairweather in Chicago, and eventually became a partner at Jones Day.
