= Wes Grant =

American football player (born 1946)

No. 89, 86, 75, 71
- Positions: Defensive end, defensive tackle

Personal information
- Born: September 24, 1946 (age 80); Los Angeles, California, U.S.
- Listed height: 6 ft 3 in (1.91 m)
- Listed weight: 245 lb (111 kg)

Career information
- High school: Los Angeles (CA)
- College: UCLA
- NFL draft: 1970: 4thth round, 97th overall pick

Career history
- New York Giants (1970); Miami Dolphins (1971)*; Buffalo Bills (1971); San Diego Chargers (1971); Cleveland Browns (1972); Montreal Alouettes (1972); Houston Oilers (1973); Southern California Sun (1974)*; Portland Storm (1974)*; Southern California Sun (1974–1975)
- * Offseason or practice squad member only

Awards and highlights
- Second-team All-Pac-8 (1969)
- Stats at Pro Football Reference

Wesley Louis Grant (born September 24, 1946) is an American former professional football defensive end who played in the National Football League (NFL) for the Buffalo Bills, San Diego Chargers, Cleveland Browns, and Houston Oilers from 1971 to 1973. He was selected by the New York Giants in the fourth round of the 1970 NFL draft. He spent the 1970 season on injured reserve.
