= Bruce A. Finlayson =

Bruce A. Finlayson is an American chemical engineer and applied mathematician. He is the Professor Emeritus of Chemical Engineering at the University of Washington, United States. He is a member of the National Academy of Engineering (NAE). He is known for his contributions to chemical engineering in general and for the development and application of computational methods engineering problems in particular.

== Career ==
Finlayson received his B.A. and M.S. degrees from the Rice University in 1961 and 1963 respectively and Ph.D. degree from the University of Minnesota in 1965; all in chemical engineering. He served for two years as a Lieutenant in the United States Navy, working at the United States Office of Naval Research in Washington, D.C.

== Books authored ==
- The Method of Weighted Residuals and Variational Principles, Academic Press (1972). ISBN 978-0-12-257050-6.
- Nonlinear Analysis in Chemical Engineering, McGraw-Hill, (1980). ISBN 978-0-07-020915-2.
- Numerical Methods for Problems with Moving Fronts, Ravenna Park Publishing, (1992). ISBN 978-0-9631765-0-9.
- Introduction to Chemical Engineering Computing, Wiley-Interscience, (2006). ISBN 978-0-471-74062-9.
