= Robert Henson =

American author and journalist

Robert Henson is an American author and journalist on topics primarily concerned with the weather and climate change.

He grew up in Oklahoma City, surrounded by the wild weather of the US Great Plains. It was a tornado warning that got him interested in atmospheric science at the age of seven. Henson holds a bachelor's degree from Rice University and a master's degree in journalism from the University of Oklahoma.

In 1989 Henson joined the National Center for Atmospheric Research (NCAR) and its parent organization, the University Corporation for Atmospheric Research (UCAR).

== Journalistic work ==
Henson has interviewed dozens of the world's top climate scientists while producing newsletters and reports for UCAR and NCAR. He has won several Distinguished Technical Communication awards in international competitions sponsored by the Society for Technical Communication. As a freelance writer, his work has appeared in Nature, Scientific American, Discover, Audubon, Sierra, and dozens of other publications. He is a contributing editor for the magazine Weatherwise and wrote and produced more than 100 segments for the US-syndicated radio program “The Weather Notebook.”

Henson's current book is The Thinking Person's Guide to Climate Change (2014) (American Meteorological Society, 497pp.)

Henson's previous books include:

- The Rough Guide to Climate Change (Rough Guides £9.99, pp320), was shortlisted for the Royal Society's £10,000 Science Book Prize.
- Television Weathercasting: A History (McFarland, 1990) and The Rough Guide to Weather (Rough Guides, 2002.)
