= Butch Davis (defensive back) =

American football player (born 1948)

No. 47
- Position: Defensive back

Personal information
- Born: July 3, 1948 (age 78); La Jolla, California, U.S.
- Listed height: 5 ft 11 in (1.80 m)
- Listed weight: 183 lb (83 kg)

Career information
- High school: Chillicothe
- College: Missouri
- NFL draft: 1970: 12th round, 287th overall pick

Career history
- Chicago Bears (1970); Green Bay Packers (1972)*
- * Offseason or practice squad member only
- Stats at Pro Football Reference

John Charles Davis (born July 3, 1948) is an American former professional football player who was a defensive back for the Chicago Bears of the National Football League (NFL). He played college football for the University of Missouri
