= Jerry Moore (American football, born 1949) =

American football player (born 1949)

No. 18, 25
- Position: Defensive back

Personal information
- Born: March 16, 1949 (age 77); Belleville, Illinois, U.S.
- Listed height: 6 ft 3 in (1.91 m)
- Listed weight: 208 lb (94 kg)

Career information
- High school: Belleville West
- College: Arkansas
- NFL draft: 1971: 4th round, 89th overall pick

Career history
- Chicago Bears (1971–1972); New Orleans Saints (1973–1974)

Awards and highlights
- Second-team All-American (1970); First-team All-SWC (1970); Second-team All-SWC (1969)

Career NFL statistics
- Games played: 43
- Interceptions: 2
- Stats at Pro Football Reference

Jerry Porter Moore (born March 16, 1949) is an American former professional football player who played defensive back for four seasons in the National Football League (NFL) with the Chicago Bears and New Orleans Saints. He played college football for the Arkansas Razorbacks.
