= Larry Rowden =

American football player (born 1949)

Larry "LD" Rowden
No. 53
- Position: Linebacker

Personal information
- Born: March 17, 1949 (age 77); Pampa, Texas, U.S.
- Listed height: 6 ft 2 in (1.88 m)
- Listed weight: 220 lb (100 kg)

Career information
- High school: Pampa
- College: Houston
- NFL draft: 1971: 10th round, 245th overall pick

Career history
- Chicago Bears (1971–1972)
- Stats at Pro Football Reference

Larry Rowden (born March 17, 1949) is an American former professional football player who was a linebacker for the Chicago Bears of the National Football League (NFL) from 1971 to 1972. He played college football for the Houston Cougars.
