= Chuck Dicus =

American football player (born 1948)

No. 28
- Position: Wide receiver

Personal information
- Born: October 2, 1948 (age 78); Odessa, Texas, U.S.
- Listed height: 6 ft 0 in (1.83 m)
- Listed weight: 183 lb (83 kg)

Career information
- High school: Garland (Garland, Texas)
- College: Arkansas
- NFL draft: 1971: 7th round, 169th overall pick

Career history
- San Diego Chargers (1971–1972)

Awards and highlights
- 2× First-team All-American (1969, 1970); 2× First-team All-SWC (1969, 1970); Second-team All-SWC (1968); 1969 Sugar Bowl MVP

Career NFL statistics
- Receptions: 24
- Receiving yards: 316
- Receiving TDs: 3
- Stats at Pro Football Reference
- College Football Hall of Fame

Charles Wayne Dicus (born October 2, 1948) is a former American professional football player who was a wide receiver for two seasons with the San Diego Chargers of the National Football League (NFL). Dicus played college football for the Arkansas Razorbacks and was inducted into the College Football Hall of Fame. He later served as president of the Razorback Foundation, the private organization that raises funds for school athletic endeavors, for 17 years.

== College career ==
Dicus played wide receiver for the Razorbacks from 1968 to 1970, ending his career as the top receiver in team history at the time. His totals of 118 catches and 1854 yards still rank as the eighth best career totals for the team. Arkansas had a 28–5 record in the years he played.

Dicus was selected All-Southwest Conference in each of his three seasons and received first team All-America honors from the American Football Coaches Association in his junior year and the AFCA, Associated Press and Walter Camp Foundation after his senior season.

In his junior season, Dicus was chosen Most Valuable Player in the 1969 Sugar Bowl after catching 12 passes for 169 yards and the game's only touchdown. He also played in the 1970 Hula Bowl and the All-American Game after completing his college playing eligibility.

Dicus was inducted into the Razorback Hall of Honor in 1993 and selected a member of the school's All-Century Team in 1994.

== Professional career ==
Dicus's career in the National Football League spanned two seasons with the San Diego Chargers and one season with the Pittsburgh Steelers. His career totals included 24 receptions for 319 yards and three touchdowns.

== Post-playing career ==
After ending his professional football career, Dicus joined the staff of Richard Williamson at the University of Memphis, then known as Memphis State University. He also sold real estate in the off-season.

In 1991, Dicus became president of the Razorback Foundation, a position he would hold until his sudden ouster in October 2008.

Dicus was inducted into the Arkansas Sports Hall of Fame in 1995. He was inducted into the College Football Hall of Fame in 1999.
