= Jeff Curchin =

American football player (1947–2011)

No. 70, 73
- Positions: Tackle, guard

Personal information
- Born: December 17, 1947; Binghamton, New York, U.S.
- Died: June 16, 2011 (aged 63); Valrico, Florida, U.S.
- Listed height: 6 ft 7 in (2.01 m)
- Listed weight: 260 lb (118 kg)

Career information
- High school: Ocala (FL)
- College: Florida State
- NFL draft: 1970: 6th round, 139th overall pick

Career history
- Chicago Bears (1970–1971); Buffalo Bills (1972)

Career NFL statistics
- Games played: 27
- Games started: 5
- Stats at Pro Football Reference

Jeff Curchin (December 17, 1947 – June 16, 2011) was an American professional football tackle and guard. He played for the Chicago Bears from 1970 to 1971 and for the Buffalo Bills in 1972.

He died on June 16, 2011, in Valrico, Florida at age 63.
