= Ross Brupbacher =

American football player (born 1948)

No. 31, 59
- Position: Linebacker

Personal information
- Born: April 7, 1948 (age 78); Lafayette, Louisiana, U.S.
- Listed height: 6 ft 3 in (1.91 m)
- Listed weight: 215 lb (98 kg)

Career information
- High school: Lafayette
- College: Texas A&M
- NFL draft: 1970: 4th round, 100th overall pick

Career history
- Chicago Bears (1970–1972); Birmingham Americans (1974-1975); Chicago Bears (1976)

Awards and highlights
- All-WFL (1974); First-team All-SWC (1969)

Career NFL statistics
- Games played: 56
- Interceptions: 12
- Fumble recoveries-for TDs: 7-1
- Stats at Pro Football Reference

Ross Alan Brupbacher (born April 7, 1948) is an American former professional football player who was a linebacker in the National Football League (NFL). He played college football for the Texas A&M Aggies

== Professional career ==
A fourth round selection (100th overall pick) of the 1970 NFL draft out of Texas A&M University, Brupbacher played for four seasons for the Chicago Bears (1970–1972, 1976). In the midst of a promising NFL career, he jumped to the World Football League in 1974 to play for the Birmingham Americans. As captain of their defense, he helped lead the Americans to the 1974 World Bowl championship game, where they defeated the Florida Blazers 22–21. He returned to the Bears for one season after the WFL ceased operations.

== Personal life ==
Brupbacher earned a Bachelor's degree in Management from Texas A&M in 1970 and a Juris Doctor from Louisiana State University's Paul M. Hebert Law Center seven years later in 1977. A member of the Louisiana State Bar Association, he practices law in the United States District Court for the Western District of Louisiana. He is a general practitioner whose primary focus is business consultations.

After the conclusion of his playing career, he has served as Sheriff of Lafayette Parish in Louisiana, trial attorney for Domengeaux, Wright, Roy & Edwards and general counsel for Lafayette General Medical Center.
