= Cliff Hardy (American football) =

American football player (born 1947)

No. 17
- Position: Cornerback

Personal information
- Born: January 28, 1947 (age 79); Fairfield, Alabama, U.S.
- Listed height: 6 ft 0 in (1.83 m)
- Listed weight: 188 lb (85 kg)

Career information
- High school: Roosevelt
- College: Michigan State
- NFL draft: 1971: 11th round, 270th overall pick

Career history
- Chicago Bears (1971)

Career NFL statistics
- Games played: 1
- Stats at Pro Football Reference

Clifton Hardy (born January 28, 1947) is an American former professional football player who was a cornerback for the Chicago Bears of the National Football League (NFL). He played college football for the Michigan State Spartans.
