= Frank Broyles =

American college football coach, college athletic director (1924–2017)

- Broyles in 1965

Biographical details
- Born: December 26, 1924; Decatur, Georgia, U.S.
- Died: August 14, 2017 (aged 92); Fayetteville, Arkansas, U.S.

Playing career

Football
- 1943–1946: Georgia Tech

Baseball
- 1946–1946: Georgia Tech
- Positions: Quarterback (football); Guard (basketball)

Coaching career (HC unless noted)

Football
- 1947–1949: Baylor (backfield)
- 1950: Florida (backfield)
- 1951–1956: Georgia Tech (backfield)
- 1957: Missouri
- 1958–1976: Arkansas

Administrative career (AD unless noted)
- 1974–2007: Arkansas

Head coaching record
- Overall: 149–62–6
- Bowls: 4–6

Accomplishments and honors

Championships
- National (1964); 7 SWC (1959–1961, 1964–1965, 1968, 1975)

Awards
- AFCA Coach of the Year (1964); SN College Football COY (1964); SWC Coach of the Year (1964); Second-team All-American (1944); 2× First-team All-SEC (1944, 1946)
- College Football Hall of Fame; Inducted in 1983 (profile)

John Franklin Broyles (December 26, 1924 – August 14, 2017) was an American college football player and coach, college athletics administrator, and broadcaster. He served as the head football coach for one season at the University of Missouri in 1957 and at the University of Arkansas from 1958 to 1976, compiling a career coaching record of 149–62–6. Broyles was also the athletic director at Arkansas from 1974 to 2007. His mark of 144–58–5 in 19 seasons at the helm of the Arkansas Razorbacks football gives him the most wins and the most coached games of any head coach in program history. With Arkansas, Broyles won seven Southwest Conference titles and his 1964 team was named a national champion by a number of selectors including the Football Writers Association of America.

Broyles attended Georgia Tech, where he was the starting quarterback for the Yellow Jackets and also lettered in baseball and basketball. Following his playing career, he was an assistant football coach at Baylor University, the University of Florida, and his alma mater, Georgia Tech. Broyles was inducted into the College Football Hall of Fame as a coach in 1983.

== Playing career ==
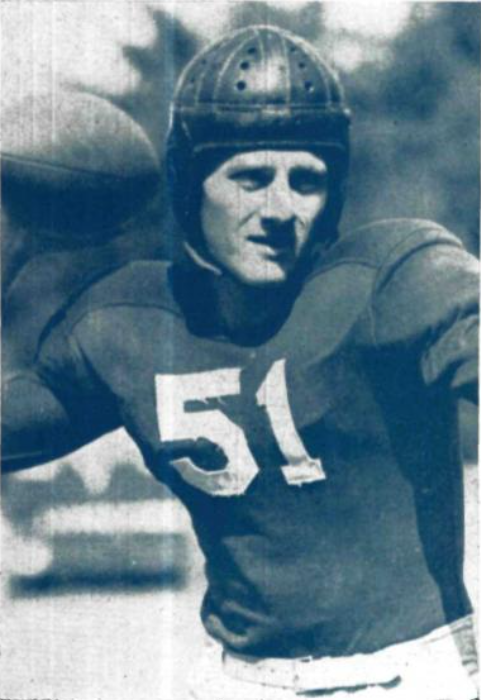
Broyles at Georgia Tech, c. 1945

After his graduation from Decatur Boys High School, Broyles studied at Georgia Tech, where he was a quarterback from 1944 to 1946. He graduated from Georgia Tech with a degree in Industrial Management. Broyles started all of Tech's games as quarterback during his senior season, and led the Yellow Jackets to the 1945 Orange Bowl. Tech lost the bowl game, but in defeat Broyles set an Orange Bowl record for passing yards with 304. The record stood for 55 years until eclipsed by Michigan quarterback Tom Brady in the 2000 Orange Bowl. Broyles is a member of the Orange Bowl (1991), Gator Bowl (1995), and Cotton Bowl Classic (1999) halls of fame, and the Georgia Tech Hall of Fame. Broyles was drafted 19th overall by the Chicago Bears in the third round of the 1946 NFL draft when he still had a year of college eligibility. When his college career was over he moved straight into coaching.

While at Georgia Tech he also played basketball.

== Coaching career ==
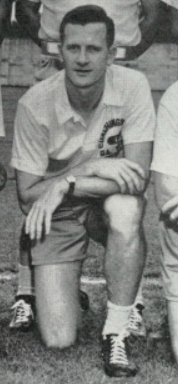
Broyles on the Georgia Tech Yellow Jackets coaching staff, c. 1956

Broyles entered coaching in 1947 as the backfield coach under head coach Bob Woodruff at Baylor University. In 1950, Broyles followed Woodruff when the latter took the head coach position at the University of Florida. In 1951, he left Florida and returned to Georgia Tech as the backfield coach under coach Bobby Dodd. Broyles sought the head coaching position at Northwestern University in 1954, and ultimately left Georgia Tech in 1957 when he was offered the position of head coach at the University of Missouri. Broyles stayed at Missouri only one season when he was offered the head coaching job at Arkansas. During his nineteen years as head coach there, he was offered other major coaching and leadership positions, but remained at Arkansas.

During his tenure at Arkansas, Broyles coached the Razorbacks to seven Southwest Conference championships, and two Cotton Bowl Classic wins. His 1964 team was proclaimed national champions by the Football Writers Association of America, as well as the Helms Foundation, and to date is the last Razorback team to go undefeated and untied in a season. If the wire service polls had not given out their national championships prior to the bowl games during that era of college football, Arkansas positively would have won both the AP and the UPI national titles as well. Not only were the Razorbacks the only undefeated and untied team in the nation, but AP and UPI national champion Alabama lost to Texas (a team Arkansas beat in Austin in 1964) in the Orange Bowl. He still holds the record for most wins by a head coach in the history of Arkansas football, with 144. During the 1960s and 1970s, one of college football's most intense rivalries was between Broyles' Razorbacks and the University of Texas Longhorns under legendary coach Darrell Royal.

Among Broyles' most memorable victories while coaching the Razorbacks was the 14–13 win over No. 1 Texas in 1964 in Austin, the 1965 Cotton Bowl victory over Nebraska to complete an undefeated season, the 1969 Sugar Bowl victory over Georgia, beating No. 2 Texas A&M in the 1975 season finale to win a share of the SWC championship, and then beating Georgia in the 1976 Cotton Bowl.

The two most painful losses in his tenure at Arkansas, included the 1966 Cotton Bowl loss to LSU that snapped Arkansas' 22 game winning streak, and, most famously, the 1969 Game of the Century that saw No. 1 Texas come from behind to beat No. 2 Arkansas, 15–14.

== Broadcasting career ==
After his retirement from coaching, but concurrent with the early part of his tenure as men's athletic director at Arkansas, Broyles served as the primary color commentator for ABC Sports television coverage of college football, normally alongside top play-by-play man Keith Jackson. Broyles' time as a broadcaster at ABC lasted from 1977 to 1985. Broyles was often assigned games involving Southeastern Conference or Southwest Conference teams, but if the primary game of a particular week involved the Razorbacks, Broyles was paired with another play-by-play man, many times Al Michaels or Chris Schenkel, while Jackson called the game with another color commentator, many times Ara Parseghian. Broyles' commentary was normally focused on play calling and coaching strategy, and while paired with Jackson, resulted in an all-Georgian booth (Jackson was a native of Roopville).

As a member of Augusta National Golf Club, Broyles from 1972 to 1977 co-hosted (with tournament chairmen Clifford Roberts and William Lane) the green jacket presentation ceremony at the end of the Masters Tournament from Butler Cabin televised on CBS.

== Athletic director ==
In 1974 Broyles was appointed Men's Athletic Director of the University of Arkansas. (Arkansas had a completely separate women's athletics department from 1971 until the men's and women's programs were merged in 2008.) Broyles continued as head football coach for three years. Since stepping down as head coach, the University of Arkansas men's athletic programs under his leadership as athletic director won 43 national championships. The Razorbacks won 57 Southwest Conference championships and 47 Southeastern Conference championships during his tenure. Broyles disbanded the men's swimming and diving program to satisfy new regulations from the SEC of having two more women's sports than men's sports.

On February 17, 2007, Broyles announced his plans to retire as Men's Athletic Director, effective December 31, 2007, ending his half-century association with Arkansas.

== Criticism ==
As athletic director, Broyles was known for being very hands-on with the football program. Indeed, at least one head coach, Ken Hatfield, left the school because he couldn't abide Broyles' meddling. After Hatfield left, at least one booster doubted whether the Razorbacks would ever attract a top-tier head coach as long as Broyles was athletic director.

== Legacy ==
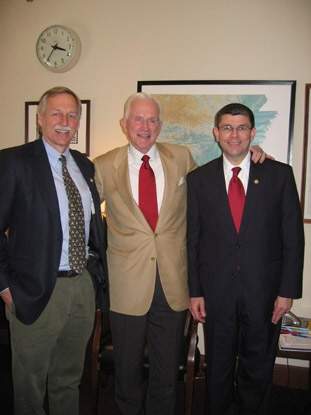
Broyles (center) with Reps. Vic Snyder (left) and Mike Ross (right)

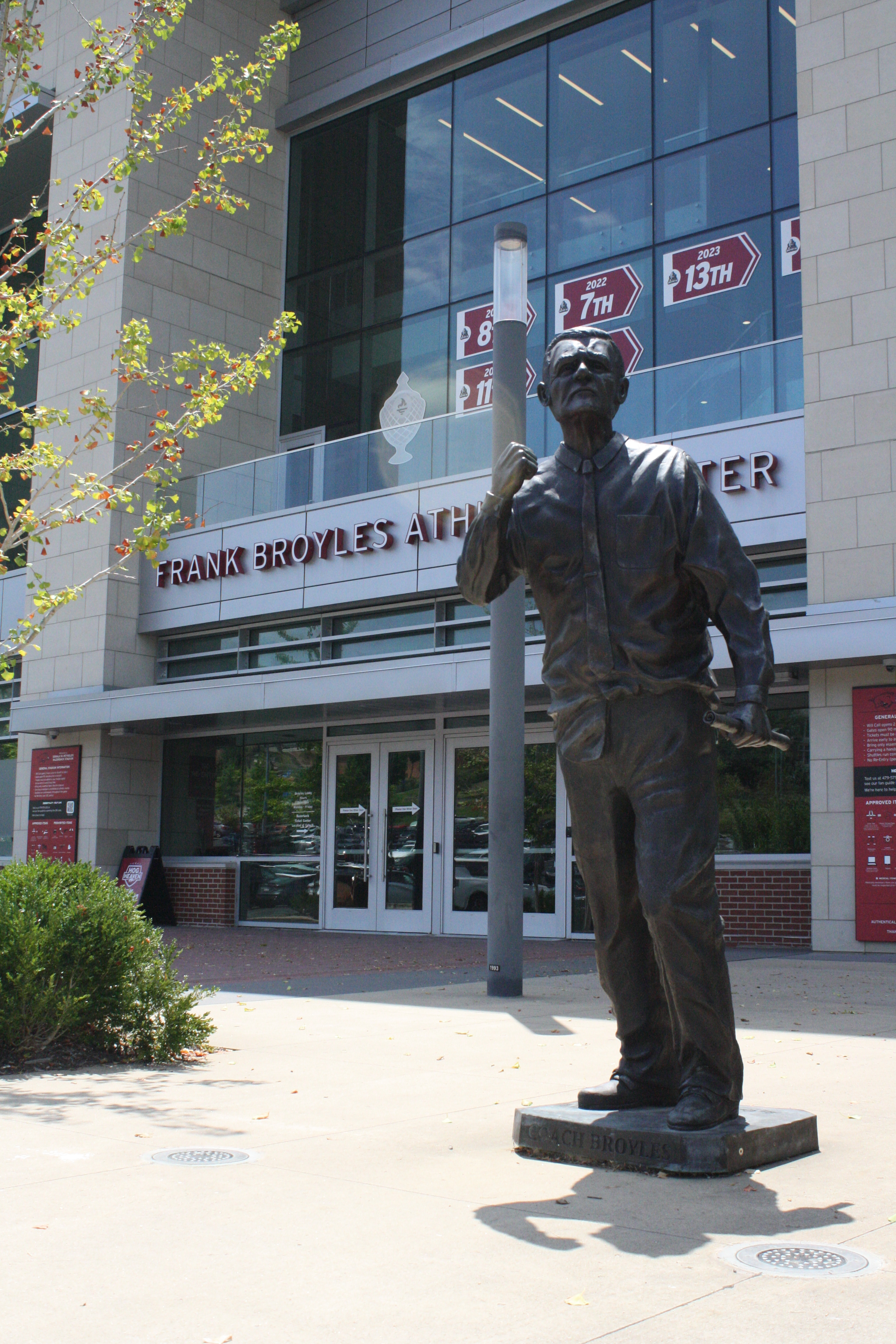
Frank Broyles statue in front of the Frank Broyles Center at Donald W Reynolds Razorback Stadium

Over thirty of his former players have also become college or professional football coaches. Broyles is known for producing high quality coaches and the prestigious Broyles Award, the annual award for best assistant coach, is named after him. Barry Switzer, Johnny Majors, Joe Gibbs, Hayden Fry, and Jimmy Johnson all served under Broyles and have combined to win five collegiate national championships and six Super Bowls. Broyles' assistants have won more than 40 conference titles. Dallas Cowboys owner Jerry Jones played on Broyles' 1964 Championship team.

Broyles' tenure as men's athletic director has seen the construction of world-class facilities for basketball, football, track and field (indoor and outdoor), golf, and baseball at Arkansas. Broyles was selected as the 20th century's most influential Arkansas sports figure. Broyles will be remembered as the only SEC athletic director that had to drop a men's sport, bringing into questions the health of the athletic department under his leadership.

Broyles was known as a fierce competitor both as a head coach and athletic director. Broyles led Arkansas out of the Southwest Conference and into the Southeastern Conference.

In 1983 Broyles was inducted into the College Football Hall of Fame, and in 1996, the Broyles Award was established to recognize the top assistant coaches in college football. He was a member of the Augusta National Golf Club.

In 2005, after his wife Barbara was diagnosed and died from Alzheimer's disease, Broyles became an outspoken advocate for Alzheimer's awareness and established the Frank and Barbara Broyles Foundation to support caregivers of Alzheimer's patients. With the assistance of the University of Arkansas Medical Sciences, he published and distributed 100,000 free copies of a book titled Coach Broyles' Playbook for Alzheimer's Caregivers to pharmacies throughout the state of Arkansas. In 2007 and again in 2009, Broyles successfully raised funds to distribute 500,000 copies of the book nationally, plus 100,000 copies in Spanish. Since then, the book has been translated into 11 different languages and distributed digitally worldwide. Broyles himself would eventually succumb to complications of the same disease on August 14, 2017. He had 2 children.

== Head coaching record ==
Year	Team	Overall	Conference	Standing	Bowl/playoffs	Coaches^{#}	AP^{°}
Missouri Tigers (Big Seven Conference) (1957)
1957	Missouri	5–4–1	3–3	T–3rd			
Missouri:		5–4–1	3–3				
Arkansas Razorbacks (Southwest Conference) (1958–1976)
1958	Arkansas	4–6	2–4	T–5th			
1959	Arkansas	9–2	5–1	T–1st	W Gator	9	9
1960	Arkansas	8–3	6–1	1st	L Cotton	7	7
1961	Arkansas	8–3	6–1	T-1st	L Sugar	8	9
1962	Arkansas	9–2	6–1	2nd	L Sugar	6	6
1963	Arkansas	5–5	3–4	4th			
1964	Arkansas	11–0	7–0	1st	W Cotton	2	2
1965	Arkansas	10–1	7–0	1st	L Cotton	2	3
1966	Arkansas	8–2	5–2	T–2nd		13	
1967	Arkansas	4–5–1	3–3–1	5th			
1968	Arkansas	10–1	6–1	T–1st	W Sugar	9	6
1969	Arkansas	9–2	6–1	2nd	L Sugar	3	7
1970	Arkansas	9–2	6–1	2nd		12	11
1971	Arkansas	8–3–1	5–1–1	2nd	L Liberty	20	16
1972	Arkansas	6–5	3–4	T–4th			
1973	Arkansas	5–5–1	3–3–1	T–4th			
1974	Arkansas	6–4–1	3–3–1	T–4th			
1975	Arkansas	10–2	6–1	T–1st	W Cotton	6	7
1976	Arkansas	5–5–1	3–4–1	6th			
Arkansas:		144–58–5	91–35–5				
Total:		149–62–6					
National championship Conference title Conference division title or championship game berth
^{#}Rankings from final Coaches Poll.; ^{°}Rankings from final AP Poll.

== See also ==
- Georgia Tech Yellow Jackets football statistical leaders
