= 1969 Sugar Bowl =

American college football game

- 35th Sugar Bowl
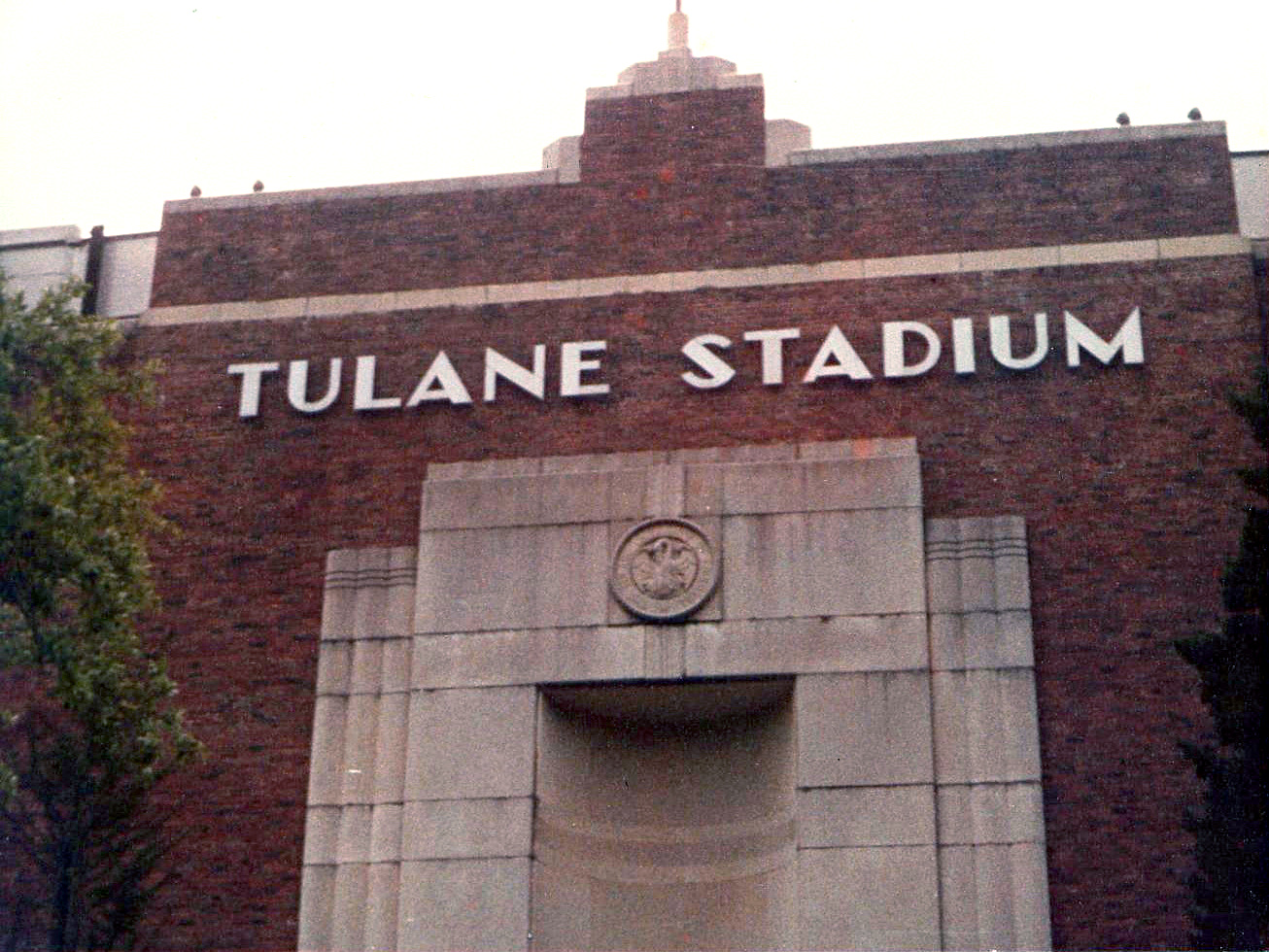
- Tulane Stadium in New Orleans, Louisiana, hosted the Sugar Bowl.
Arkansas Razorbacks	Georgia Bulldogs
(9–1)	(8–0–2)
SWC	SEC
16	2
Head coach: Frank Broyles	Head coach: Vince Dooley
AP / Coaches; 9 / 9	AP / Coaches; 4 / 4
	1	2	3	4	Total
Arkansas	0	10	0	6	16
Georgia	0	2	0	0	2
- Date: January 1, 1969
- Season: 1968
- Stadium: Tulane Stadium
- Location: New Orleans, Louisiana
- MVP: Chuck Dicus (Arkansas SE)
- Favorite: Georgia by 7 points
- Referee: James Artley (SEC; split crew: SEC, SWC)

United States TV coverage
- Network: NBC
- Announcers: Charlie Jones, George Ratterman

The 1969 Sugar Bowl was the 35th edition of the college football bowl game, played at Tulane Stadium in New Orleans, Louisiana, on Wednesday, January 1. It featured the fourth-ranked Georgia Bulldogs of the Southeastern Conference (SEC), and the #9 Arkansas Razorbacks of the Southwest Conference (SWC).

Underdog Arkansas won 16–2, and split end Chuck Dicus was named the outstanding player after catching twelve passes.

== Teams ==
=== Arkansas ===
Guard Jim Barnes was a consensus All-American for the Razorbacks in 1968. Bill Burnett's 16 touchdowns scored tied him for eighth-most points scored nationally. The Hogs lost only once, to the #17 Texas Longhorns, 39–29. The Razorbacks and Longhorns thus shared the Southwest Conference crown for 1968, but Texas received the bid to the Cotton Bowl based upon the head-to-head victory.

=== Georgia ===
Vince Dooley's Georgia Bulldogs went 8–0–2 and won the SEC, only tying Tennessee and Houston. The Bulldogs' defense was anchored by consensus All-American end Bill Stanfill.

== Game summary ==
Georgia's number-one ranked defense matched up against the ninth-ranked offense of Arkansas on New Year's Day in New Orleans. The first game of a major bowl tripleheader (Rose, Orange) on NBC, it kicked off at 1 pm CST.

The first quarter was scoreless; in the second, Arkansas quarterback Bill Montgomery threw a 27-yard touchdown pass to Chuck Dicus, but Georgia got a safety to pull within 7–2. Arkansas kicker Bob White made a 34-yard field goal and the Razorbacks led 10–2 at halftime. After a scoreless third quarter, White kicked field goals of 24 and 31 yards in the fourth quarter to seal the Arkansas win at 16–2.

The game had twenty punts (ten each) and eleven turnovers (eight by Georgia).

Scoring summary

Quarter	Time	Drive			Team	Scoring information	Score	
Quarter	Time	Plays	Yards	TOP	Team	Scoring information	ARK	UGA
2			65		ARK	Chuck Dicus 27-yard touchdown reception from Bill Montgomery, Bob White kick good	7	0
2					UGA	Bill Burnett tackled in end zone for a safety by David McKnight	7	2
2			71		ARK	34-yard field goal by Bob White	10	2
4			55		ARK	24-yard field goal by Bob White	13	2
4			15		ARK	31-yard field goal by Bob White	16	2
"TOP" = time of possession. For other American football terms, see Glossary of American football.							16	2

== Statistics ==
Statistics	Arkansas	Georgia
First downs	13	13
Rushing	41–40	47–75
Passing	17–39–1	11–31–3
Passing yards	185	117
Total offense	80–225	78–192
Punts–avg.	10–33.6	10–38.5
Fumbles–lost	4–2	5–5
Turnovers	3	8
Penalties–yards	4–31	4–25

== Aftermath ==
After twelve years, this was the last Sugar Bowl on NBC; it returned to ABC in January 1970.

Arkansas returned to the Sugar Bowl the following year; Georgia's next major bowl was seven years later in the Cotton Bowl, also against Arkansas, and returned to the Sugar Bowl the following year.

The teams next met in the 1991 Independence Bowl, with Georgia winning 24-15. It was Arkansas' last football game before joining the SEC; the teams met for the first time as conference foes during the 1992 season.
