= Armed Forces Benefit Football Game =

American football game (1946–1970)

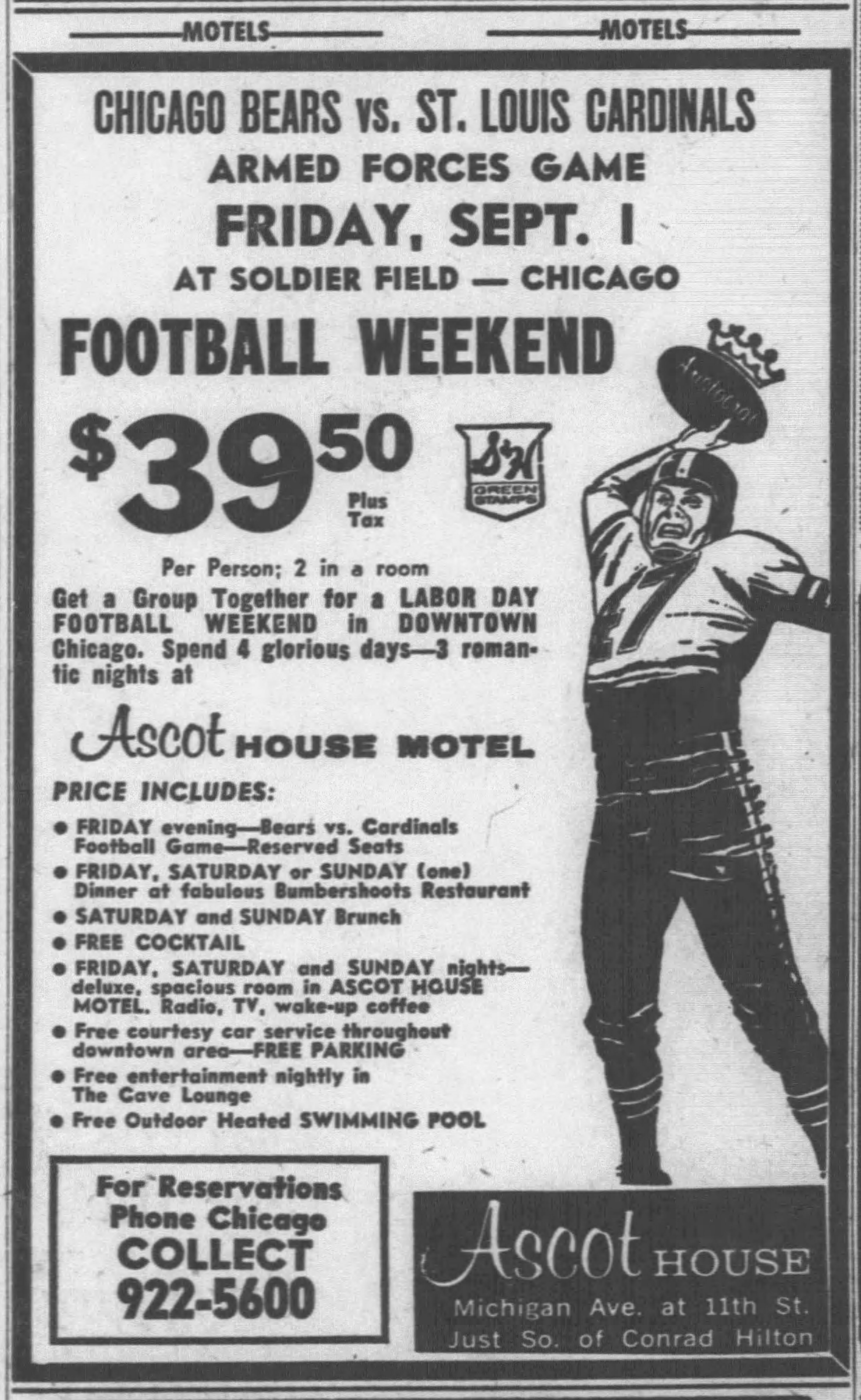
- Ascot House Hotel advertisement in the Chicago Tribune for the weekend of the 1967 game
- Stadium: Soldier Field (1947, 1951, 1953, 1955–1970); Wrigley Field (1946, 1948–1950, 1952, 1954)
- Location: Chicago, Illinois, US
- First played: 1946
- Last played: 1970
- Trophy: Eisenhower Trophy (MVP)

The Armed Forces Benefit Football Game was an American football game held annually from 1946 to 1970. Organized by the Chicago Bears with the support of the United States Armed Forces, it was a preseason exhibition game in which the Bears played against National Football League teams to fundraise for military relief funds. The games raised over $1 million.

As the host team, the Bears won 15 times with nine losses and a tie. All but one of their opponents were from the NFL's Eastern Conference as the Western Conference-based Bears wanted to play against teams whom they were not scheduled to meet in the regular season. The Cleveland Browns and New York Giants were the Bears' most common opponents in the 1950s, while they only played the St. Louis Cardinals from 1963 to 1969. The Pittsburgh Steelers faced Chicago twice while four teams—the Philadelphia Eagles, Washington Redskins, fellow Western Conference team Minnesota Vikings, and the now-defunct Boston Yanks—had one appearance each.

In celebration of the military, the game had ceremonies before the start and for the halftime show that usually consisted of bands and exhibition drill teams from the armed services. Dwight D. Eisenhower, the future President of the United States who helped create the game when he was General of the Army, lent his name to the Eisenhower Trophy that was given to the most valuable player. Military leaders also attended the games as guests of honor, to present the trophy to the winner, or were tasked with coordinating the pageantry.

The Armed Forces Benefit was exclusively played in Chicago. Wrigley Field and Soldier Field alternated hosting the game before permanently being moved to the latter in 1955, where it remained until cancellation. Soldier Field became the Bears' permanent home in 1971.

== Creation ==
While serving in the United States Navy during World War II, Bears owner George Halas thought of hosting a charity football game to support the military. The concept was common during the conflict as wartime professional gridiron football, which included meetings between NFL franchises and against military teams, doubled as drives to sell war bonds or support armed forces charities. Such games began as early as January 1942, a month after the attack on Pearl Harbor and American entry into the war, when the 1941 champion Bears won the NFL All-Star Game and raised over $25 thousand for the Navy Relief Fund. Chicago would also play against a United States Army all-star team in a 1942 preseason meeting that donated $36 thousand to an Army relief fund.

In March 1946, Halas and Chicago Herald-American editor Ralph Cannon were invited to Washington, D.C., where they met Eisenhower, Navy Admiral Chester W. Nimitz, and Lieutenant General Ira C. Eaker on behalf of Gen. Carl Spaatz of the Army Air Forces. Halas proposed the Bears host an exhibition against an opponent whom they were not scheduled to play in the regular season. Eaker was receptive since the NFL had donated substantially to the military during the war, especially to the Air Corps, while Nimitz appreciated the patriotic fervor that Chicagoans showed in supporting the war effort and expected they "again will demonstrate their awareness of the tasks remaining for the Navy Relief Society and its fellow relief agencies."

The plan was publicly revealed on March 22 with the inaugural matchup set for September 1 and the Redskins confirmed to play in 1947. Proceeds were donated to the Army Emergency Relief, Army Relief Fund, Army Air Force Aid Society (later the Air Force Aid Society), and Navy Relief Fund. The Bears' media guides described the game's goals as helping to provide "financial assistance to widows and orphans of servicemen, care and assistance to service personnel, to wounded servicemen and their families, hospital-medical attention to needy families and dependents of servicemen, prenatal and obstetrical care to needy servicemen's families, and cash grants to service personnel and dependents in emergencies." Eisenhower called the game a "patriotic gesture" and "another profound demonstration of the gratitude of everyone for the sacrifices of our sons and daughters in the armed forces."

== Organization ==
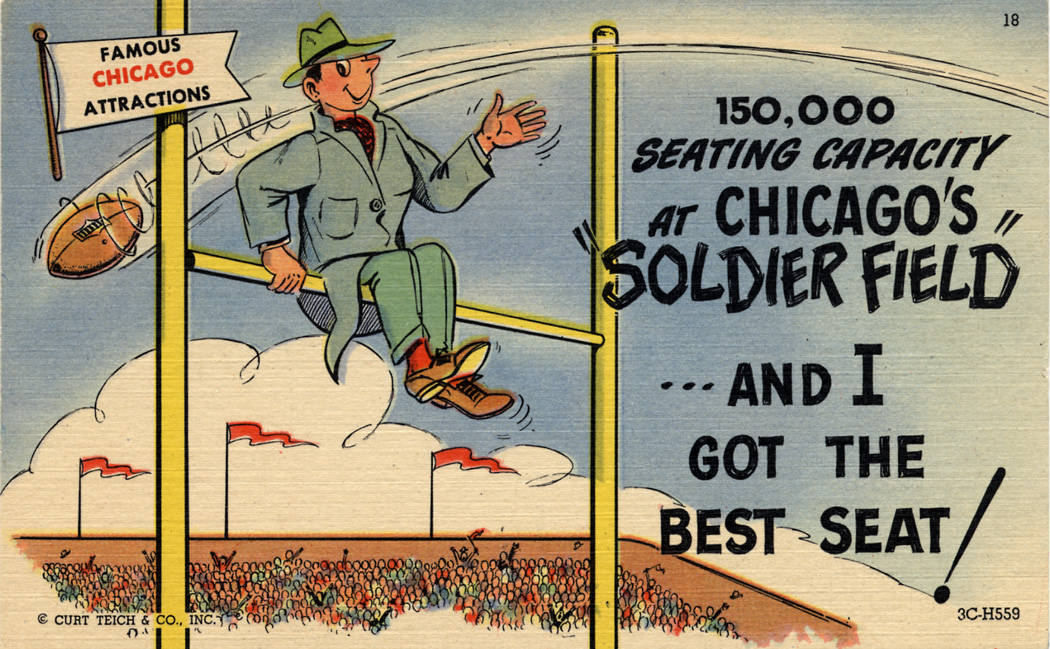
1950s postcard promoting Soldier Field, which hosted 19 Armed Forces Benefit Games

The Armed Forces Benefit Game was sponsored by Chicago's newspapers throughout its life. The Herald-American was the sponsor for the first two editions, then the Chicago Sun-Times took over from 1949. In 1955, the sports departments of all four local publications—the American, Daily News, Sun-Times, and Tribune—joined as the Chicago Newspaper Publishers Association to back the game. Eisenhower, who was President at the time, submitted a telegram to the association saying he was "happy to learn" of the deal and that it would "result in a significant contribution to the official relief agencies of our armed forces. I am confident that the benefit game will be supported wholeheartedly by the people of the Chicago area."

Bears business manager Rudy Custer was the game's executive director. He served in the Navy with Halas before being hired by the team in January 1946.

Wrigley Field, where the Bears primarily played their home games, hosted the inaugural Armed Forces Benefit in 1946. It alternated with Soldier Field through 1954 before the latter became the permanent venue. Soldier Field rarely hosted pro football at the time, which was limited to benefit games like the Chicago Charities College All-Star Game that invited NFL teams to play against a roster of college all-stars. The first professional game at the venue, between the Bears and Chicago Cardinals in 1926, was also done for charity. If higher attendance was expected, temporary bleachers were installed.

Local radio broadcasts for the game were done by the station already covering the Bears. WGN was often the carrying network, though WBBM had play-by-play coverage too like in 1951. The visitors' local stations also broadcast the games such as WJZ in New York calling the Bears–Giants matchup in 1946.

Television coverage varied. ABC did a "preview of the professional football season" by airing the 1946 game with Harry Wismer as commentator; Wismer also called the game for WJZ. The 1951 game was not televised in Chicago whereas WKZO-TV did in Kalamazoo, Michigan, while CBS picked up the rights to show the 1952 edition nationally. WBBM-TV aired the games on a broadcast delay throughout the 1960s.

== Games ==
=== 1940s ===
The first game was held on September 1, 1946, at Wrigley Field in front of 32,367 spectators. A spectator recalled the visiting Giants had worn brown helmets without chin straps for the game, resulting in helmets coming off each play and players diving for them after mistaking them for the ball; Redskins general manager Dick McCann joked ahead of the 1947 Benefit Game that a repeat would not occur since his team's helmets were "nailed on, and if they're still big enough, we fill our players' heads with air." The Bears had a poor start as they only advanced four yards on the opening drive, but improved afterward as Hugh Gallarneau ran for two touchdowns and rookie Joe Osmanski added a third. The United Press described Chicago as "somewhat less than sensational in recent years" yet "showed flashes of their pre-war power", the latter a comparison also echoed by the Tribune. Bears star George McAfee only appeared for five minutes in the second quarter since Halas opted to play rookies and backups. McAfee entered the game after Giants quarterback Frank Filchock threw an interception (one of three by New York) before leading the Bears on an 89-yard scoring drive. At halftime, an all-time College Football All-America Team curated by sportswriters was introduced; former Bears greats Red Grange and Bronko Nagurski were among those recognized as was Chicago starting center Bulldog Turner, who played in the game. The game, ending in a 19–0 Bears win, raised $69,395.29.

1947 was Soldier Field's first time hosting the game. Chicago, the defending league champions, defeated Washington 28–7 in front of a then-Chicago pro football record 54,732 fans. While the meeting was touted as a quarterback duel between Chicago's Sid Luckman and Washington's Sammy Baugh, the latter did not play due to rib injuries. Luckman threw two touchdown passes to Ken Kavanaugh while Bob Fenimore and Gallarneau ran for one each. The Redskins' lone touchdown was a 15-yard throw from Jim Youel to Hugh Taylor while down 21–0.

The game returned to Wrigley for 1948. Playing the Yanks, Luckman and Bears rookie quarterbacks Bobby Layne and Johnny Lujack combined for five touchdown passes: Luckman threw one to Kavanaugh in the first quarter, Lujack completed another to Max Bumgardner in the second quarter despite an ankle injury, and Layne had 68- and 66-yard scores to Frank Minini and Jim Keane in the second half. McAfee intercepted Boston's Frank Dancewicz and ran 61 yards for a touchdown, while Jim Canady ran for a three-yard score. The Bears went up 28–0 at halftime before completing the game with a 42–7 victory, the Yanks' lone score coming in the fourth quarter on a one-yard run by Bill Paschal.

Lujack suffered a shoulder injury early in the 1949 game, leaving Luckman and rookie George Blanda as the Bears' quarterbacks against the Giants. Blanda led a 76-yard drive on his first drive, culminating in a touchdown throw to George Gulyanics, and also kicked a 22-yard field goal to put the Bears up 10–0. Emlen Tunnell intercepted a pass to set up Charlie Conerly's 14-yard score to Ray Poole for the Giants' first points of the game. Gulyanics and Joe Scott exchanged touchdown runs in the third quarter. In the final period, Poole tied the game at 17 apiece with a 19-yard field goal. With seconds before the end of regulation, Conerly attempted a quick kick on third down from the Giants' 35-yard line, but the punt was blocked by Ed Sprinkle and recovered by Bill Milner. Luckman drove the Bears to the one-yard line, where rookie quarterback George Blanda kicked the game-winning field goal.

By the end of the decade, the games had raised over $176 thousand.

=== 1950s ===
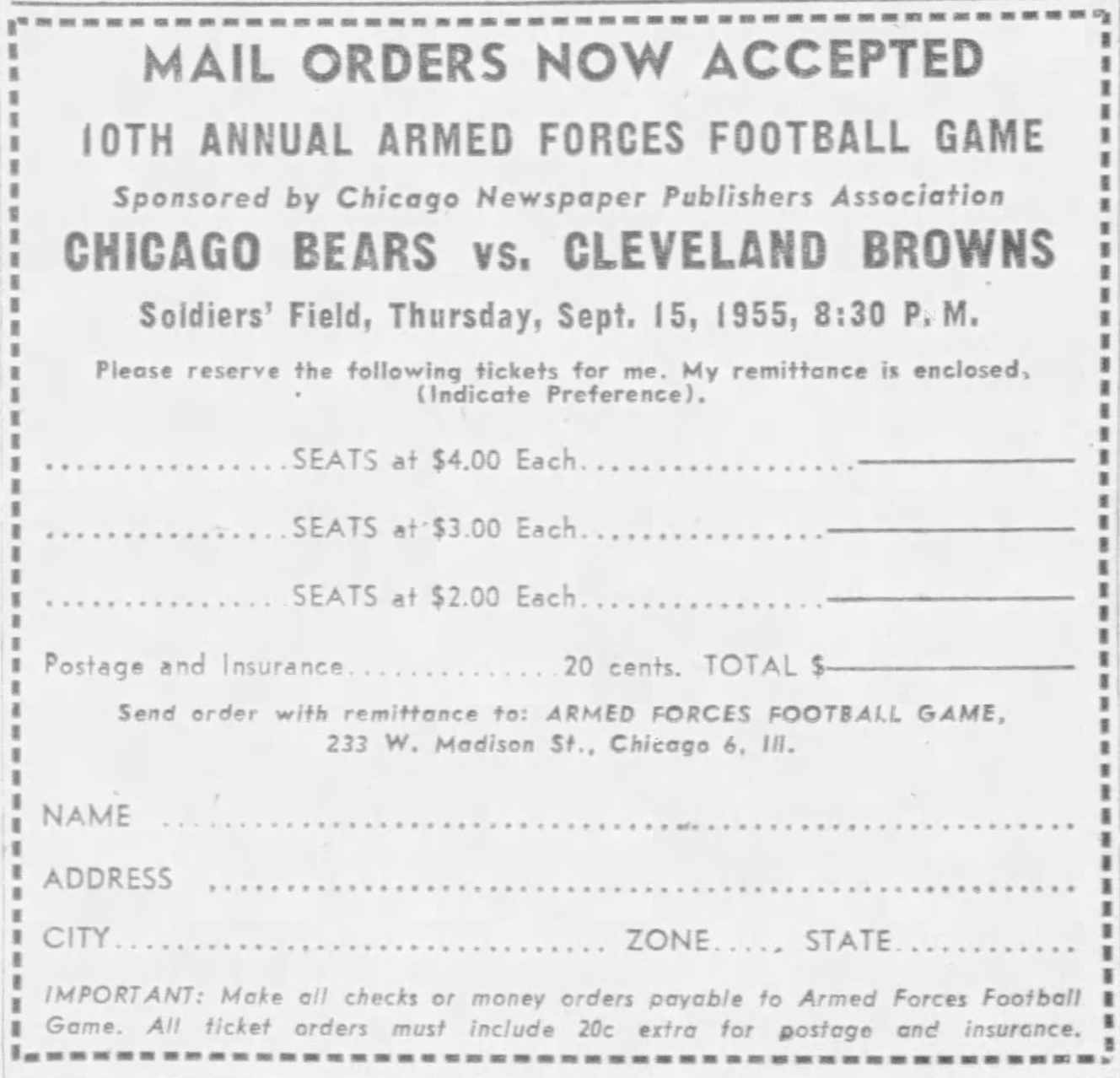
Chicago Tribune advertisement for the 1955 game

The first two Armed Forces Benefit Games of the 1950s saw the Bears play the defending league champions. 1950 pitted them against the Philadelphia Eagles, whose only loss in their 1949 championship season was to the Bears. The Eagles led by three points until Luckman took over for Lujack in the third quarter. He guided the Bears on a 49-yard scoring game that ended with an 11-yard pass to Gulyanics. Lujack added a 14-yard field goal in the fourth to clinch a 10–3 win.

Soldier Field resumed hosting the game in 1951 when the Bears played the Cleveland Browns. Despite having won each edition to this point, Chicago was viewed as underdogs since they took on a team that had won a title in every season of their existence, including the 1950 NFL Championship Game. The Bears were overwhelmed for much of the game, falling behind 23–0 at halftime via Lou Groza kicking three field goals and touchdowns by Dub Jones and Otto Graham to Dante Lavelli. Groza converted a fourth field goal to put the Browns up by 26 after three quarters. Bears quarterback Bob Williams was intercepted on three consecutive passes before being pulled following a sack by three Browns defenders. Chicago tried to respond in the final quarter, when the Browns had already deployed their backups, with three touchdowns—a goal-line run by John Dottley to cap off a 60-yard drive, an 80-yard punt return touchdown by Wilford White, and a four-yard rush for Dottley—but was unable to close the gap. Cliff Lewis scored the Browns' only touchdown in the second half with a 52-yard throw to Bob Oristaglio that gave them a 32–7 lead. The game set the Chicago record for most fans at an exhibition game with 67,342.

The 1952 game was described by the Tribune as a meeting between "frustrated former powers" as the Bears and Giants had struggled to find regular season success since 1946. White was responsible for the Bears' 17 points by lateraling to Don Kindt who ran 46 yards for the score in the first quarter, catching a 47-yard pass from Williams in the second, and kicking a 22-yard field goal in the fourth. Conerly and fellow Giants quarterbacks Fred Benners and Travis Tidwell were sacked multiple times, while Scott scored their only poins on a 60-yard touchdown run in the third quarter.

Browns fullback Harry Jagade starred in the 1953 edition. He ran for 28 yards on three carries to set up Graham's touchdown via quarterback sneak, then scored on a 24-yard run. Groza kicked field goals of 14 and 43 yards in the second and third quarters. Down 20–0, Chicago's Billy Stone scored a touchdown with a five-yard end-around and rookie quarterback Tommy O'Connell completed a 53-yard TD pass to Jim Dooley but the Bears still lost by six. Jagade ended the game with 73 rushing yards on 20 attempts, for which he won the inaugural Eisenhower Trophy.

Wrigley Field hosted the game for the final time in 1954 in front of 22,334 spectators, which included the Baltimore Colts and coach Weeb Ewbank as they wanted to analyze the Bears and Giants before playing them that regular season. Jagade, now a member of the Bears, mainly contributed in a supporting role as one of their "only running threats" alongside Stone. The Giants scored first on Conerly's six-yard throw to Bob Schnelker, but Conerly lost a fumble that led to Stone's four-yard sweep to tie the game. A Conerly touchdown to Gifford put their team up at halftime, though the Bears took the lead after Herb Johnson fumbled and Blanda threw three touchdowns to Harlon Hill, Dooley, and Stone. New York scored only 10 points in the second half via Haldo Norman's 31-yard field goal and Conerly's 35-yard pass to Dick Wilkins. The game was Chicago quarterback Zeke Bratkowski's professional debut, completing three passes and being intercepted by Dick Nolan which led to the Wilkins touchdown.

Chicago and Cleveland continued to meet annually for much of the decade. In 1955, the Browns led 21–7 after the first half, scoring early on Fred Morrison's four-yard run in the first and Graham's 14-yard quarterback keeper in the second; the Bears answered on Ed Brown to Hill for a 17-yard score before Graham connected with Lavelli on a 20-yard touchdown. Chicago scored the only points after halftime as Jagade ran for a three-yard score and Brown threw an 11-yard TD pass to Bill McColl in the third quarter to tie the game. Cleveland's Ed Modzelewski lost a fumble on his team's 23 to set up the game-winning nine-yard field goal by Blanda with 5:55 remaining. Including regular season and exhibitions, the win was the first time in eight tries that the Bears defeated the Browns.

The Bears entered the 1956 meeting with a five-game preseason win streak while the Browns had dropped their last five since winning the College All-Star Game at Soldier Field a month prior. Although the Bears opened the game with an 80-yard drive that culminated in Rick Casares' four-yard TD run, their rookie Perry Jeter fumbled and the ball was recovered by Cleveland's Don Paul and returned for a 32-yard score. Casares also lost a fumble in the third quarter that Chuck Noll picked up and brought to the Bears' three-yard line, where Modzelewski scored on fourth down. Bob Gain added a field goal to give the Browns a 10-point lead before Casares ran for a one-yard TD to keep the Bears within one score. Pete Brewster sealed the win for Cleveland with a ten-yard touchdown catch from George Ratterman.

In the 1957 game, a year after the Bears appeared in the NFL Championship, Bears rookie Willie Galimore ran for two touchdowns—one seven yards long and the other 26—to help the Bears lead 26–3 by the end of the third quarter. Brown threw for 195 yards, including a 70-yard touchdown to Dooley, as part of a 244-yard passing attack by the Bears. The defense limited Cleveland to only 70 passing yards by four quarterbacks, who were also sacked for a combined 111 yards. Blanda had an extra point blocked by Billy Reynolds after Galimore's second score but made three field goals (11, 27, and 32 yards), while the Browns' lone points came on a 48-yard kick by Groza in the third quarter.

After stepping down as Bears head coach in 1956, Halas returned to his post for 1958 with the Armed Forces Benefit Game against Cleveland being his first game back in Chicago. The Browns took a 10–0 lead that persisted into a 24–14 advantage at halftime, aided by Bobby Mitchell's two touchdowns (including a 99-yard kickoff return score) and Leroy Bolden's five-yard run. However, Galimore recorded four touchdowns, one of which came on a 95-yard kickoff return to start the second half. The Bears outscored the Browns 21–0 in the third quarter before Bolden scored on a one-yard run and Casares threw a 17-yard touchdown to Hill to clinch the 42–31 victory. Halas remarked the Bears had "used the (halftime) intermission to calm down. It was as simple as that."

The 1959 game was seen by Chicago media as the "1st big test" for the offense as they played the Giants, who won their conference and had the top-ranked defense the year before while shutting out their last two preseason opponents. Instead, Chicago's offense recorded 355 total yards with 233 coming by passing from Brown and Bratkowski. Dooley recorded 137 receiving yards on ten catches with two touchdowns. Conerly scored the Giants' only touchdown on a two-yard run to complete an 83-yard drive. All four extra points in the game, attempted by John Aveni and Pat Summerall, were missed as two got blocked, another went directly into the players at the line of scrimmage, and another hit the crossbar. The Tribune joked the game "must have set some kind of a professional football record for conversion futility".

After 14 games by the end of the 1950s, the Armed Forces Benefit had raised $600 thousand.

=== 1960s ===
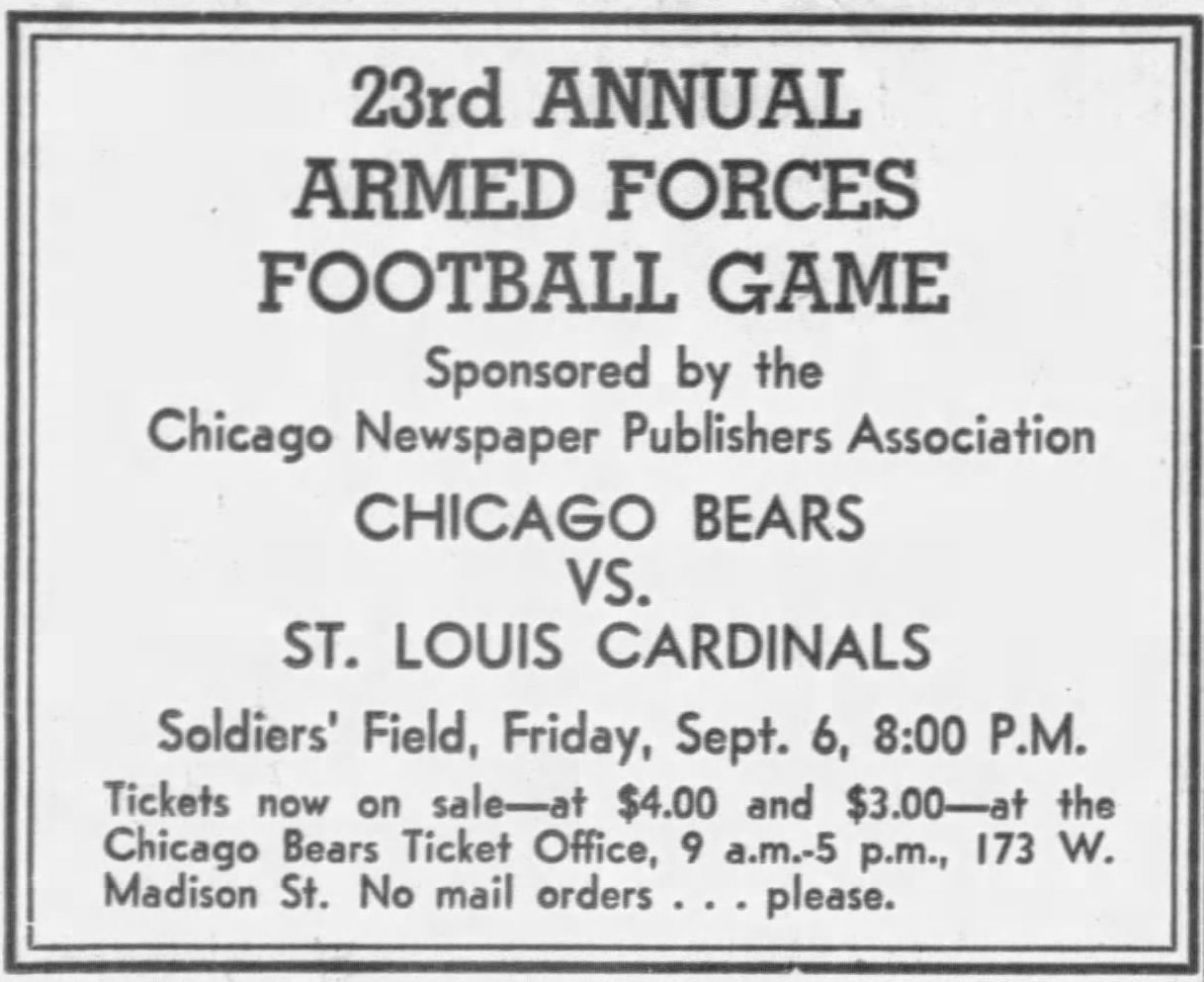
Tribune advertisement for the 1968 game

The Pittsburgh Steelers made their Armed Forces Benefit debut in 1960. Former Bears quarterbacks Layne and Rudy Bukich led the Steelers, who traded touchdowns with Chicago in the second quarter off Preston Carpenter's 55-yard punt return and Casares' three-yard run. A five-yard TD run by Galimore to cap off an 81-yard series put the Bears up in the third quarter, and Layne responded with two identically designed touchdown throws to Jimmy Orr, both over Bears defender Vic Zucco, of 51 and 43 yards. While it appeared the Steelers were on the verge of beating the Bears for the first time in team history, Bratkowski threw a 31-yard touchdown to Angelo Coia with 16 seconds remaining. The final moments of the 21–21 draw saw a brawl that led to Bill George and Mike Sandusky being ejected.

The Bears lost feature backs Dooley and Johnny Morris to injuries before the 1961 rematch with Pittsburgh, so Coia was slotted into a starting role alongside Bo Farrington. Despite losing their starters, the Bears took a 17–0 lead at halftime thanks to Farrington's 75- and 90-yard touchdown passes from Brown. Coia, despite dropping a potential score from Brown, had a touchdown of his own when Bill Wade connected with him for a 92-yard TD. In the fourth quarter, Layne rallied the Steelers with two touchdowns to Charley Scales and another to ex-Bear Bob Coronado. A "seemingly innocuous" 36-yard field goal by Roger LeClerc in the second quarter kept the Bears ahead by three points, and the Steelers were unable to recover the onside kick with less than a minute to play.

A wave of injuries plagued the Bears in the leadup to the 1962 meeting with the undefeated Browns; Coia and 1957 Eisenhower Trophy recipient Fred Williams were among the absences for a Chicago roster that had lost all of their preseason games. After the Bears' first drive ended with a seven-yard punt by Bobby Joe Green, the Browns scored on their second offensive play via 29-yard pass from Ernie Green to Ray Renfro. Green had only joined the Browns a month prior, but went on to record more rushing yards than his "more illustrious" teammate Jim Brown. Farrington answered on Chicago's second play of their next possession with an 80-yard touchdown from Wade, though Brown scored on a five-yard TD run for Cleveland. Penalties set back the Bears defense on both of the Browns' scoring drives, including a 30-yard pass interference and a holding penalty to set up Brown's touchdown. Cleveland's Jim Ninowski threw a five-yard touchdown to Rich Kreitling and a 13-yard score to Gary Collins, while the Bears' Galimore and Charlie Bivins ran for 11- and six-yard touchdowns. Bukich, who returned to Chicago for 1962, guided the offense in the fourth quarter to the Bivins score and put them up by three points. However, Ninowski led a 73-yard drive, aided by a Bears penalty, and completed the game winner to Collins. George Strickler of the Tribune sarcastically called the Bears "football's most interesting loser".

The St. Louis Cardinals became the Bears' annual opponent in the Armed Forces Benefit starting in 1963 and through 1969. The teams were rivals when the Cardinals played in Chicago, with the 1963 game being their first matchup since their relocation in 1959. It also marked the Cardinals' return to Soldier Field after playing there during their last season in the city. Chicagoans, especially those who supported the Chicago Cardinals, welcomed the arrangement because it allowed them to attend rivalry games in person without going to Wrigley Field (which was considered the Bears' domain).

After neither team scored in the first quarter to begin the 1963 meeting, a personal foul followed by unsportsmanlike conduct penalty on the Cardinals' Jimmy Hill (for which he was ejected) helped the Bears take the lead with Ronnie Bull's seven-yard TD run. Multiple holding penalties on Chicago also allowed the Cardinals to drive downfield before halftime but they turned the ball over on downs. The Cardinals missed another scoring opportunity to start the second half when Wade was intercepted by Larry Wilson but Jim Bakken's 41-yard field goal went wide. Wade completed a 61-yard score to Morris to go up 14–0. Johnson, who threw an interception in the first half, helped the Cardinals score 17 unanswered points via a five-yard touchdown to Billy Gambrell, Bakken's field goal, and a 25-yard score to Sonny Randle. The Cardinals modified their gameplan for the second half to account for "unexpected changes" in the Bears' starting lineup, which Johnson felt factored heavily into his team's win.

Chicago entered the 1964 game as the reigning NFL champions, though the team was struggling in preseason and coming off a loss to their rival Green Bay Packers in which the offense recorded just 140 yards. Most offensive starters like Bull, Morris, and Mike Ditka were also unavailable due to injuries. The offense's difficulties continued against the Cardinals with only 105 total yards to St. Louis' 320, including 55 passing. Johnson threw a 24-yard touchdown pass to Randle in the second quarter for the game's lone TD, though the former had two more scores (40 yards to Randle in the first and 28 yards to Bob Paremore in the fourth) called back by penalties. The Bears' closest touchdown opportunity came in the third when Billy Martin returned a punt 54 yards to the Cardinals' eight-yard line, but Kreitling dropped a pass in the end zone and they turned the ball over on downs. An illegal procedure penalty on the Cardinals led to a 47-yard field goal by Bob Jencks for Chicago's only points. The Bears regained the ball with 4:05 left following Bakken's missed 40-yarder. The drive began with Bukich's pass for Casares being intercepted by Jerry Stovall, but Casares stripped the ball from Stovall and recovered it to keep the Bears in contention. The offense entered St. Louis' side of the field before Kelton Winston fumbled. Another chance came after the defense forced a punt, but Bukich threw another interception to Wilson. During the game, the Bears used a pair of television sets for players to watch recorded footage of previous plays. A similar concept would be adopted by the NFL in 2014 using tablet devices.

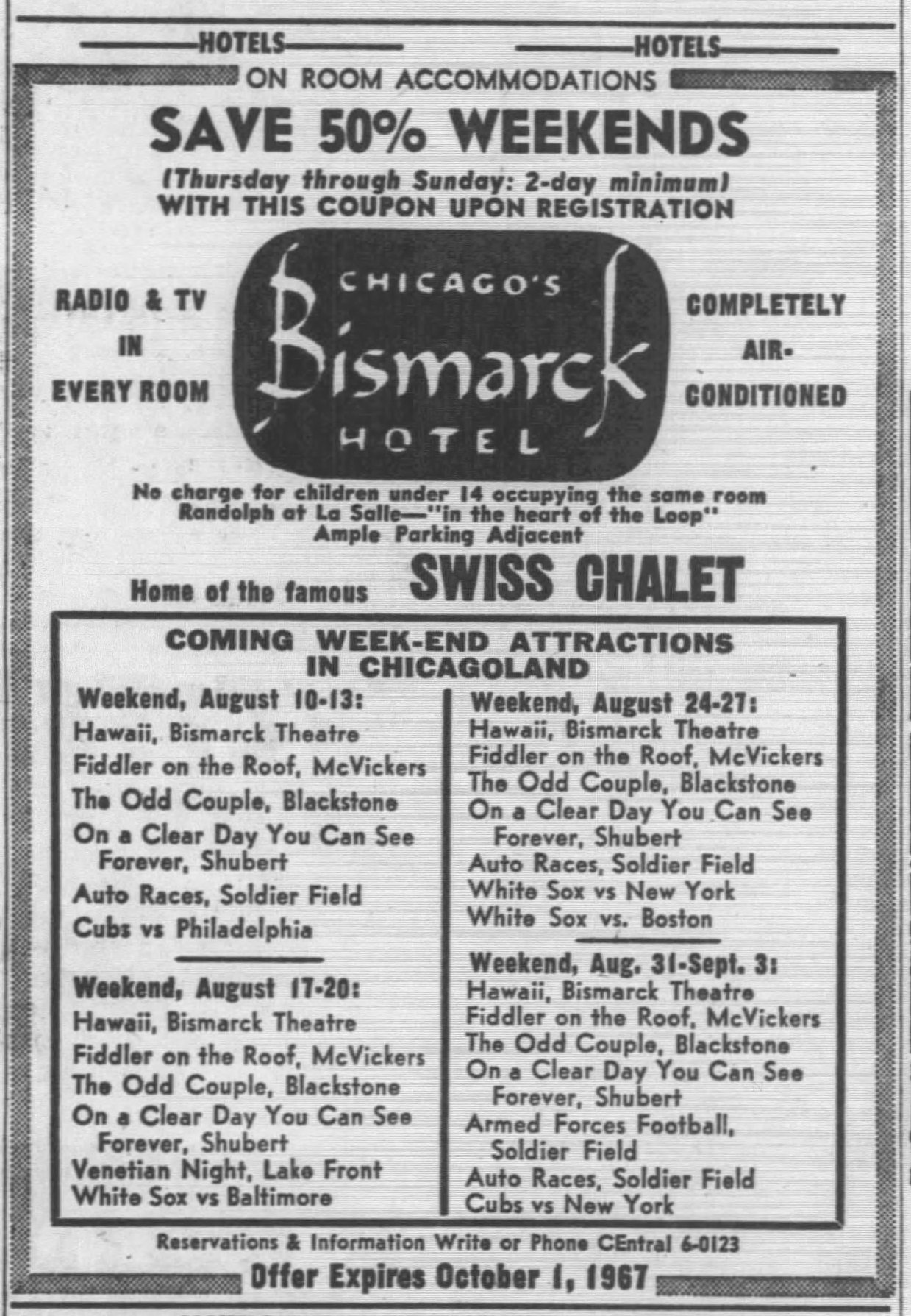
1967 Tribune advertisement for the Bismarck Hotel, mentioning the Armed Forces Benefit on the same weekend as an auto race at Soldier Field

The Bears and Cardinals went into the 20th Armed Forces Benefit with injuries sidelining those like Wade and Robb. Although the Bears scored first on Mike Eischeid's 32-yard field goal, the Cardinals recorded 25 unanswered points with Bakken's 25-, 27-, and 37-yard kicks, Johnson to Randle for an 18-yard touchdown, and Bukich being sacked in the end zone by Don Brumm for a safety. Bukich also threw four interceptions and sacked five times while the run game had just 98 total yards. Rookie Gale Sayers had a 35-yard punt return from the Bears' nine to their 44 that was negated by a clipping penalty. Tribune writer Cooper Rollow sardonically remarked that Bakken, a "24-year-old sporting goods salesman", had "kicked the stuffings out of the football and the Chicago Bears". The two teams met in the regular season at Wrigley Field, where the Bears exacted revenge by winning 34–13; Halas said after the game that "we learned a few things from that Armed Forces Game against them. You experiment in preseason games, or at least we do. The Cardinals humiliated us in that game at Soldier Field, but we learned our lesson."

LeClerc, who was maligned in recent years for his inconsistency, became the only kicker to win the Eisenhower Trophy for his 1966 effort. He made all five of his field goal attempts from 44, 38, 33 (twice), and 22 yards, with the fifth giving the Bears the 22–20 lead early in the fourth quarter and the win. Bukich also led an 80-yard series in the third quarter that ended in a 14-yard TD to Jimmy Jones, the Bears' first touchdown in the Armed Forces Benefit since 1963. Bakken made his two field goals from 42 and 41 yards while the Cardinals had two touchdowns on a one-yard run by Willis Crenshaw and a 71-yard throw from Johnson to Jackie Smith. Johnson led the Cardinals into Chicago's side of the field before Dick Butkus picked off his pass intended for Smith.

The Bears entered 1967's Armed Forces Benefit with an 0–3 preseason record, including losing 66–24 to the Kansas City Chiefs of the American Football League in their last game. Larry Rakestraw, a practice squad quarterback for much of his career, started the game for Chicago because of a sore arm for starter Jack Concannon. Rakestraw recorded three touchdowns in the first half, throwing a 38-yard TD to Brian Piccolo before running for two more on 15- and four-yard scores. Sayers also ran for two touchdowns with a six-yard score in the first quarter and a 72-yard run in the second. Jim Hart completed a four-yard score to Johnny Roland before halftime, though the Cardinals trailed 35–7 while Hart had thrown three interceptions. The second half only saw a touchdown from each team with Bukich completing a 43-yard score to Bob Jones and Hart getting a 29-yarder to Randle.

1968 was the first year for Dooley as Bears head coach while Halas watched the game from a press box. The Cardinals struggled with catching the ball as their receivers dropped "five or six catchable passes" from Hart, though he completed two touchdowns to Dave Williams; Williams would catch four passes for 121 yards. Bears kicker Mac Percival, who had only made two of eight field goals in the 1968 preseason, converted four of his five attempts in the Armed Forces Benefit from 50, 22, 37, and 28 yards while missing from 16. Bull scored on a 41-yard touchdown run to start the second half. After Percival's fifth kick put the Bears up 19–17, Sayers clinched the win with a 30-yard reception.

Chicago and St. Louis both sported 3–2 records going into the 1969 Armed Forces Benefit, though the Bears had only scored six total touchdowns while the Cardinals were coming off a win. Concannon threw for 251 yards with three touchdowns to Piccolo, Ron Copeland, and Dick Gordon, but the Bears trailed for much of the game as the defense struggled to contain Johnson. Johnson, who had recently returned from military service, recorded 189 passing yards and three TD passes, two to Williams and another to Smith. The Bears were down 31–17 after the third quarter before Concannon's touchdowns to Copeland and Gordon, the latter coming on a 76-yard drive. Trailing 37–31, Chicago drove to St. Louis' five-yard line but Piccolo was stopped on fourth-and-one with 55 seconds left.

The final game in 1970 was the only instance in which the Bears played against a fellow Western Conference opponent as they hosted their rival Minnesota Vikings, who had lost Super Bowl IV in the previous season. Taking advantage of a Bears defense without Butkus, who was sidelined with a strained hamstring, the Vikings scored the first two touchdowns as Dave Osborn ran for a one-yard score then caught a 15-yard pass from Gary Cuozzo. Chicago's Craig Baynham lost a fumble to set up the second Vikings touchdown, but made up for the turnover by catching a six-yard TD from Concannon. Percival had two field goals to narrow the margin to 14–13 at halftime. After they exchanged field goals in the third quarter, Osborn gave Minnesota the lead on another one-yard touchdown. The Bears fought back with Concannon's four-yard TD to Linzy Cole and Bennie McRae's 28-yard fumble return touchdown. With five seconds remaining on fourth down, Cuozzo threw a 40-yard touchdown pass to Clinton Jones. Kicker Fred Cox made the tiebreaking extra point to win 31–30.

== Festivities ==
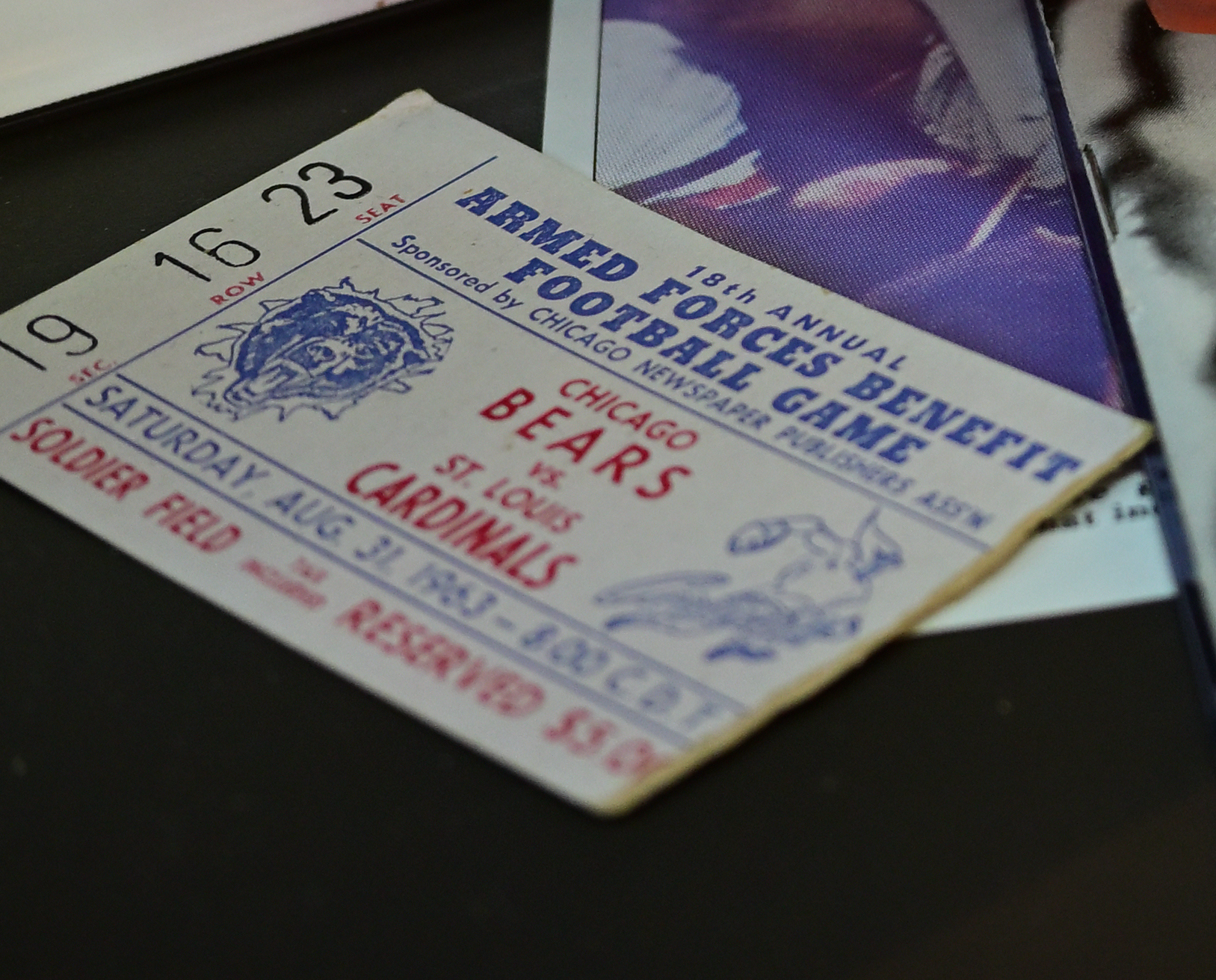
Ticket stub from the 1963 game

The Armed Forces Benefit invited bands and honor guards from military units regionally and nationally to march and perform in pre-game ceremonies and at halftime. Responsibility for organizing the ceremonies rotated between branches, and the Department of Defense appointed a coordinator to oversee the pageantry. For example, the 1959 game was coordinated by Lt. Gen. William Howard Arnold, commander of the United States Fifth Army, while Brig. Gen. Hugh M. Elwood did so in 1964 when the Marine Corps was assigned the role.

Before games, service members from every branch paraded to the stadium and onto the field. A color guard would be present as the troops were reviewed by a military figure before they went to their seats. The pre-game show occasionally included special acts like a performance by 14 dogs from the 1st Infantry Division's 48th Infantry Scout Dog Platoon, which took place in 1955. At halftime, performers included bands and exhibition drill teams like the Marine Corps' Silent Drill Platoon and Drum and Bugle Corps.

As part of 1957 pre-game festivities, two MIM-3 Nike Ajax missiles were brought to Soldier Field by the Army Air Defense Command's 45th Artillery Brigade at Arlington Heights. The missiles formed a gate for parading troops to march through and into the stadium. Nike Ajax rockets were also displayed from 1960 to 1962, where they were elevated into firing position on the field in a "show of defensive might".

Naval Station Great Lakes, the closest installation to the stadium and where Halas played college football during World War I, had sailors from the Naval Service and Recruit Training Commands take part in the festivities. Cheerleaders from Great Lakes were introduced in 1966. Other stationed personnel could also attend the games on discounts and free ticket packages offered by the base.

Prior to the 1953 game, Eisenhower approved the creation of the Eisenhower Trophy for the most valuable player, which was determined by sportswriters and broadcasters. The trophy was presented to the recipient in a ceremony at the following year's game, mainly by a military figure; civilians like the American's publisher Stuart List and high school coach Paul Shebby, who coached 1960 co-winner Bratkowski, were also trophy presenters. Nimitz attended the 1953 game as a guest of honor to award the inaugural Eisenhower Trophy, though Jagade officially received it in 1954. Gifford won the 1954 trophy despite his team's loss. Jagade accepted the 1962 Eisenhower Trophy at the 1963 game on Ninowski's behalf since the latter and the Browns were playing a game that night.

== Cancellation and legacy ==
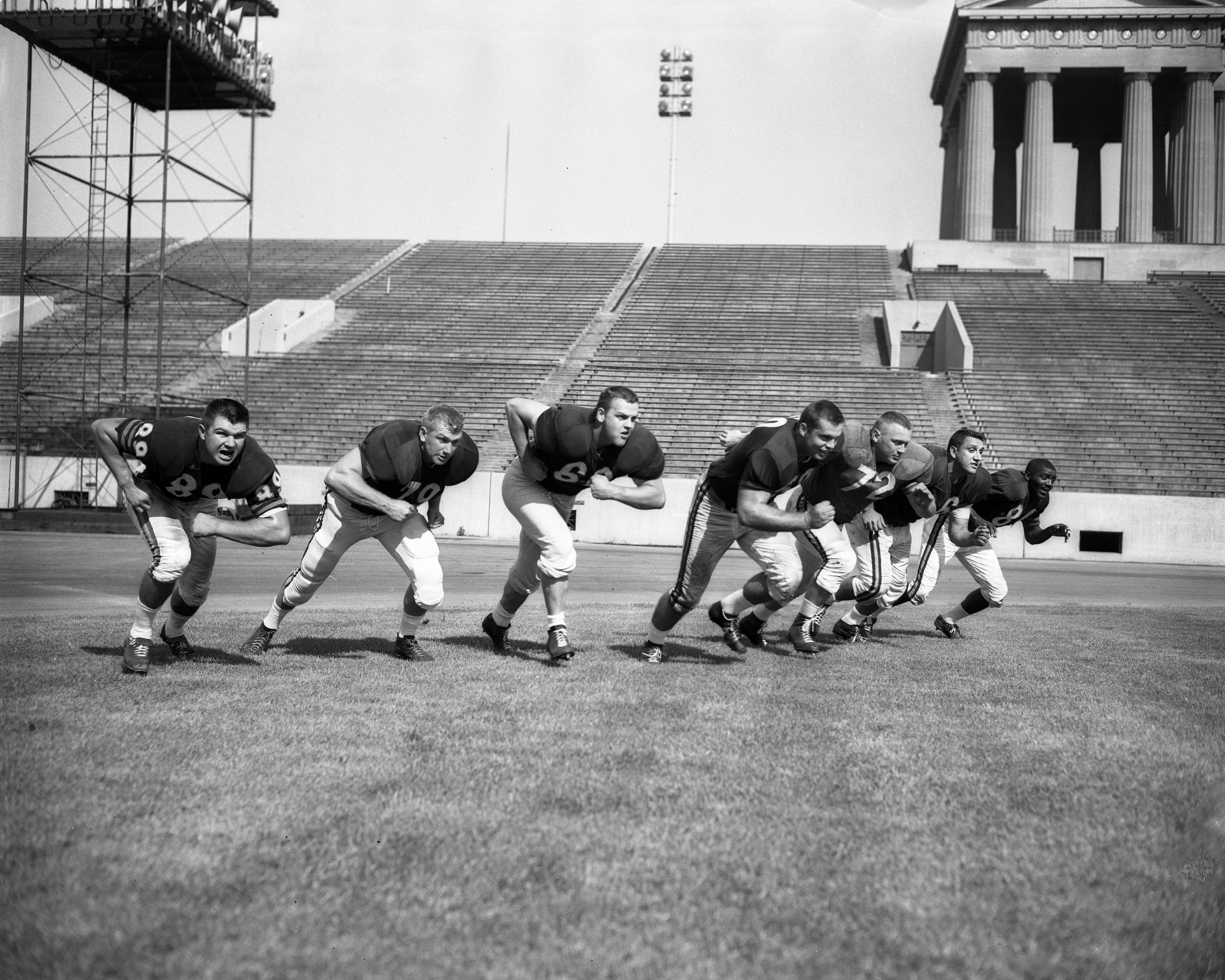
The Bears' offensive line practicing for the 1961 game

The game was not renewed for 1971. In a 1972 letter to the editor of the Tribune, a reader lamented the cancellation by writing it was "one of the summer highlights of Chicago sports and the fans have really missed it the past few years. Bring back the Armed Forces Benefit Game in 1973!"

Over the 25 games played, the series raised over $1 million for the military relief funds. In recognition for him creating the game, Halas was given awards by bodies like the Association of the United States Army's Chicago chapter and the United Service Organizations. AUSA gave him an award of merit in 1964, which Dooley accepted for Halas, while comedian Bob Hope presented the USO award of distinction to Halas at the 1980 USO Gala. At the 1956 Armed Forces Benefit's halftime ceremony, Halas received the Navy Distinguished Public Service Award, the Navy's highest medal for a civilian, from Secretary of the Navy Charles Thomas for the game and his service in both World Wars. Rear Admiral Howard A. Yeager, the commandant for the Ninth Naval District, said in 1964 that the military was "deeply indebted" to Halas for his work with the game.

The military festivities, as well as the game's philanthropy, aligned with Soldier Field's original mission since the stadium was built to be a memorial to American soldiers who died in combat. While the venue hosted military tribute events in its early history, such displays were subsequently supplanted by the Armed Forces Benefit; an Army Day ceremony in 1946 was the last "strictly military show" prior to the game's introduction. When the game was canceled, service-related celebrations were limited to Independence Day until the stadium's renovation in 2003. Mike Imrem of the Daily Herald suggested reviving the game in a 2009 column as he felt Soldier Field no longer lived up to its name and heritage by becoming exclusively known for football.

Liam T. A. Ford wrote in his 2009 book Soldier Field: A Stadium and Its City:

In many ways, the game supplanted the military shows that had preceded World War II at the stadium, bringing military units to parade at Soldier Field and providing a cheap recreational outlet for military personnel. From the start, the stadium's tradition of patriotic spectacle melded easily with professional football, as Halas and others involved with the NFL cultivated the Americanness of their sport.

In place of the Armed Forces Benefit, the Bears offered a $100,000 charity game at Northwestern's Dyche Stadium as a compromise during negotiations to play there full-time starting in 1971. The Bears had been forced to leave Wrigley Field due to a new NFL policy that stipulated stadiums have at least 50,000 seats. As part of a five-year contract between Northwestern and the Bears signed in February, a third of the proceeds would go to the city of Evanston while the Bears were to "use their best efforts" to organize a second preseason game in 1972. The deal was rejected a month later by the Big Ten Conference, which ruled pro sports could not be played at stadiums on college campuses.

The Bears instead moved to Soldier Field for 1971, marking the first permanent pro football tenant there since the 1959 Cardinals. They continue to use Soldier Field as their home stadium as of 2025.

== Results ==
| Year | Date | Winning team | Score | Losing team | Venue | Attendance | Source |
|---|---|---|---|---|---|---|---|
| 1946 | September 1 | Chicago Bears | 19–0 | New York Giants | Wrigley Field | 32,367 | |
| 1947 | September 17 | Chicago Bears | 28–7 | Washington Redskins | Soldier Field | 54,732 | |
| 1948 | September 5 | Chicago Bears | 42–7 | Boston Yanks | Wrigley Field | 27,569 | |
| 1949 | September 10 | Chicago Bears | 20–17 | New York Giants | Wrigley Field | 32,560 | |
| 1950 | September 10 | Chicago Bears | 10–3 | Philadelphia Eagles | Wrigley Field | 38,233 | |
| 1951 | September 9 | Cleveland Browns | 32–21 | Chicago Bears | Soldier Field | 67,342 | |
| 1952 | September 14 | Chicago Bears | 17–7 | New York Giants | Wrigley Field | 28,158 | |
| 1953 | September 11 | Cleveland Browns | 20–14 | Chicago Bears | Soldier Field | 36,796 | |
| 1954 | September 12 | Chicago Bears | 28–24 | New York Giants | Wrigley Field | 22,334 | |
| 1955 | September 15 | Chicago Bears | 24–21 | Cleveland Browns | Soldier Field | 43,067 | |
| 1956 | September 22 | Cleveland Browns | 24–14 | Chicago Bears | Soldier Field | 56,543 | |
| 1957 | September 20 | Chicago Bears | 29–3 | Cleveland Browns | Soldier Field | 47,354 | |
| 1958 | September 12 | Chicago Bears | 42–31 | Cleveland Browns | Soldier Field | 52,669 | |
| 1959 | September 11 | Chicago Bears | 18–6 | New York Giants | Soldier Field | 48,385 | |
| 1960 | September 16 | Chicago Bears; Pittsburgh Steelers | 21–21 | Tie | Soldier Field | 38,602 | |
| 1961 | September 8 | Chicago Bears | 24–21 | Pittsburgh Steelers | Soldier Field | 45,273 | |
| 1962 | September 7 | Cleveland Browns | 28–24 | Chicago Bears | Soldier Field | 57,878 | |
| 1963 | September 1 | St. Louis Cardinals | 17–14 | Chicago Bears | Soldier Field | 60,884 | |
| 1964 | August 28 | St. Louis Cardinals | 7–3 | Chicago Bears | Soldier Field | 50,173 | |
| 1965 | September 3 | St. Louis Cardinals | 25–3 | Chicago Bears | Soldier Field | 52,648 | |
| 1966 | September 2 | Chicago Bears | 22–20 | St. Louis Cardinals | Soldier Field | 58,620 | |
| 1967 | September 1 | Chicago Bears | 42–14 | St. Louis Cardinals | Soldier Field | 41,073 | |
| 1968 | September 6 | Chicago Bears | 19–17 | St. Louis Cardinals | Soldier Field | 59,681 | |
| 1969 | September 12 | St. Louis Cardinals | 37–31 | Chicago Bears | Soldier Field | 61,227 | |
| 1970 | September 11 | Minnesota Vikings | 31–30 | Chicago Bears | Soldier Field | 46,630 | |

=== Standings ===
| Team | GP | W | L | T | Pct. |
|---|---|---|---|---|---|
| Boston Yanks | 1 | 0 | 1 | 0 | .000 |
| Chicago Bears | 25 | 15 | 9 | 1 | .620 |
| Cleveland Browns | 7 | 4 | 3 | 0 | .571 |
| Philadelphia Eagles | 1 | 0 | 1 | 0 | .000 |
| Pittsburgh Steelers | 2 | 0 | 1 | 1 | .250 |
| Minnesota Vikings | 1 | 1 | 0 | 0 | 1.000 |
| New York Giants | 5 | 0 | 5 | 0 | .000 |
| St. Louis Cardinals | 7 | 4 | 3 | 0 | .571 |
| Washington Redskins | 1 | 0 | 1 | 0 | .000 |

=== Eisenhower Trophy winners ===
| Year | Player | Position | Team | Presenter | Source |
|---|---|---|---|---|---|
| 1953 | Harry Jagade | FB | Cleveland Browns | Adm. Chester W. Nimitz (USN) | |
| 1954 | Frank Gifford | HB | New York Giants | Adm. Arleigh Burke (USN) | |
| 1955 | Ed Brown | QB | Chicago Bears | SECNAV Charles Thomas (USN) | |
| 1956 | Pete Brewster | E | Cleveland Browns | Gen. William Howard Arnold (USA); Stuart List (American publisher) | |
| 1957 | Fred Williams | DT | Chicago Bears | Adm. Arleigh Burke (USN) | |
| 1958 | Willie Galimore | HB | Chicago Bears | | |
| 1959 | Jim Dooley | E | Chicago Bears | | |
| 1960 | Zeke Bratkowski; Rick Casares | QB; FB | Chicago Bears | Paul Shebby (Schlarman Academy coach) | |
| 1961 | Bo Farrington | E | Chicago Bears | Adm. George Whelan Anderson Jr. (USN) | |
| 1962 | Jim Ninowski | QB | Cleveland Browns | | |
| 1963 | Charley Johnson | QB | St. Louis Cardinals | CMC Wallace M. Greene (USMC) | |
| 1964 | Sonny Randle | E | St. Louis Cardinals | Gen. Harold Keith Johnson (USA) | |
| 1965 | Larry Stallings | LB | St. Louis Cardinals | Adm. David L. McDonald (USN) | |
| 1966 | Roger LeClerc | K | Chicago Bears | Gen. James K. Woolnough (USA) | |
| 1967 | Larry Rakestraw | QB | Chicago Bears | Gen. Jack G. Merrell (USAF) | |
| 1968 | Dave Williams | WR | St. Louis Cardinals | SECNAV John Chafee (USN) | |
| 1969 | Jackie Smith | TE | St. Louis Cardinals | | |

== See also ==
- Chicago Charities College All-Star Game, a preseason game mainly played at Soldier Field from 1934 to 1976
