= 1967 Chicago Bears season =

NFL team season

- Owner: George Halas
- Head coach: George Halas
- Home stadium: Wrigley Field

Results
- Record: 7–6–1
- Division place: 2nd place Central
- Playoffs: Did not qualify

The 1967 season was the Chicago Bears' 48th season in the National Football League. The team improved on their 5–7–2 record from 1966 and finished with a 7–6–1 record and earning them a second-place finish in the newly formed Central Division within the NFL's Western Conference. 1967 also marked the final season with George Halas as the team's head coach. Halas, one of the founders of the NFL, continued as the owner of the franchise until his death in 1983.

== Offseason ==
=== NFL draft ===
1967 Chicago Bears draft
Round	Pick	Player	Position	College	Notes
1	10	Loyd Phillips	Defensive end	Arkansas	
2	36	Bob Jones	Wide receiver	San Diego State	
3	63	Garry Lyle	Running back	George Washington	
4	90	Al Dodd	Cornerback	Northwestern State	
4	95	Tom Greenlee	Defensive back	Washington	
5	119	Bruce Alford Jr.	Kicker	TCU	
6	142	Virgil Carter	Quarterback	BYU	
6	143	Doug Kriewald	Guard	West Texas A&M	
7	169	John Truitt	Wide receiver	Indiana State	
8	195	Roger Murphy	Wide receiver	Northwestern	
8	200	Jerry Griffin	Linebacker	SMU	
9	221	Greg Cass	Center	Washington	
11	273	Earl Mayo	Running back	Morgan State	
12	299	Bruce Green	Wide receiver	Midland (Neb.)	
13	326	Kaye Carstens	Defensive back	Nebraska	
14	351	Lynn Nesbitt	Guard	Wake Forest	
15	377	Terry Oakes	Defensive end	San Francisco State	
16	403	Bill Rogers	Defensive back	Weber State	
17	429	Jack Myers	Linebacker	Western Colorado	
Made roster

=== Undrafted free agents ===
1967 undrafted free agents of note
Player	Position	College
Fred Bristo	Cornerback	Tennessee State
Floyd Butler	Running back	Northeastern State
Bob Stark	Wide receiver	Northern Illinois

== Roster ==
1967 Chicago Bears roster
Quarterbacks (QB): 10 Rudy Bukich; 11 Jack Concannon; 12 Larry Rakestraw; Running backs (RB): 29 Ronnie Bull; 32 Ralph Kurek; 48 Andy Livingston; 41 Brian Piccolo; 40 Gale Sayers; Wide receivers (WR): 45 Dick Gordon; 43 Bob Jones; 80 Jimmy Jones; 47 Johnny Morris; Tight ends (TE): 85 Duane Allen; 84 Austin Denney	Offensive linemen (OL): 72 Jim Cadile G; 65 Randy Jackson T; 70 Bob Pickens T; 50 Mike Pyle C; 64 Mike Rabold G; 67 George Seals G; 63 Bob Wetoska T; Defensive linemen (DL): 81 Marty Amsler DE; 73 Frank Cornish DT; 79 Dick Evey DT; 76 John Johnson DT; 74 Frank McRae DT; 87 Ed O'Bradovich DE	Linebackers (LB): 55 Doug Buffone OLB; 51 Dick Butkus MLB; 59 Rudy Kuechenberg OLB; 53 Jim Purnell OLB; 62 Mike Reilly OLB; Defensive backs (DB): 22 Charlie Brown SS; 46 Curt Gentry CB; 26 Bennie McRae CB; 17 Richie Petitbon SS; 20 Joe Taylor CB; 24 Roosevelt Taylor FS; Special teams (ST): 88 Bobby Joe Green P; 83 Mac Percival K	Practice squad: 68 Dennis Brewster DE; 15 Virgil Carter QB; 25 Tom Greenlee S; 60 Doug Kriewald G; 44 Garry Lyle RB; 57 Dan Pride OLB; Reserve: 61 Don Croftcheck G (IR); 23 Al Dodd CB (IR); 86 Loyd Phillips DE (IR); 89 Terry Stoepel TE (Military); Rookies in italics

== Regular season ==
=== Schedule ===
Week	Date	Opponent	Result	Record	Venue	Attendance
1	September 17	at Pittsburgh Steelers	**L** 13–41	0–1	Pitt Stadium	53,365
2	September 24	at **Green Bay Packers**	**L** 10–13	0–2	Lambeau Field	50,861
3	October 1	at **Minnesota Vikings**	**W** 17–7	1–2	Metropolitan Stadium	44,868
4	October 8	Baltimore Colts	**L** 3–24	1–3	Wrigley Field	47,190
5	October 15	**Detroit Lions**	**W** 14–3	2–3	Wrigley Field	46,024
6	October 22	at Cleveland Browns	**L** 0–24	2–4	Cleveland Municipal Stadium	83,183
7	October 29	Los Angeles Rams	**L** 17–28	2–5	Wrigley Field	46,073
8	November 5	at **Detroit Lions**	**W** 27–13	3–5	Tiger Stadium	55,606
9	November 12	New York Giants	**W** 34–7	4–5	Wrigley Field	46,223
10	November 19	St. Louis Cardinals	**W** 30–3	5–5	Wrigley Field	47,147
11	November 26	**Green Bay Packers**	**L** 13–17	5–6	Wrigley Field	47,513
12	December 3	at San Francisco 49ers	**W** 28–14	6–6	Kezar Stadium	25,613
13	December 10	**Minnesota Vikings**	**T** 10–10	6–6–1	Wrigley Field	40,110
14	December 17	at Atlanta Falcons	**W** 23–14	7–6–1	Atlanta Stadium	54,107
Note: Intra-division opponents are in **bold** text.

=== Season summary ===
==== Week 1 ====
Team	1	2	3	4	Total
Bears	13	0	0	0	13
• Steelers	10	7	17	7	41

- Date: September 17
- Location: Pitt Stadium
- Game attendance: 53,365
- Game weather: 71 °F (22 °C); wind 5 mph

==== Week 2 ====
Team	1	2	3	4	Total
Bears	0	0	3	7	10
• Packers	0	10	0	3	13

- Date: September 24
- Location: Lambeau Field
- Game attendance: 50,861
- Game weather: 49 °F (9 °C); wind 9 mph

==== Week 3 ====
Team	1	2	3	4	Total
• Bears	7	0	10	0	17
Vikings	0	0	0	7	7

- Date: October 1
- Location: Metropolitan Stadium
- Game attendance: 44,868
- Game weather: 65 °F (18 °C); wind 15 mph

==== Week 4 ====
Team	1	2	3	4	Total
• Colts	0	3	7	14	24
Bears	3	0	0	0	3

- Date: October 8
- Location: Wrigley Field
- Game attendance: 47,190
- Game weather: 61 °F (16 °C); wind 12 mph

==== Week 5 ====
Team	1	2	3	4	Total
Lions	0	0	0	3	3
• Bears	0	7	0	7	14

- Date: October 15
- Location: Wrigley Field
- Game attendance: 46,024
- Game weather: 58 °F (14 °C); wind 8 mph

==== Week 6 ====
Team	1	2	3	4	Total
Bears	0	0	0	0	0
• Browns	0	0	7	17	24

- Date: October 22
- Location: Cleveland Municipal Stadium
- Game attendance: 83,183
- Game weather: 44 °F (7 °C); wind 4 mph

==== Week 7 ====
Team	1	2	3	4	Total
• Rams	7	7	7	7	28
Bears	0	7	3	7	17

- Date: October 29
- Location: Wrigley Field
- Game attendance: 46,073
- Game weather: 42 °F (6 °C); wind 13 mph

==== Week 8 ====
Team	1	2	3	4	Total
• Bears	14	7	6	0	27
Lions	0	7	6	0	13

- Date: November 5
- Location: Tiger Stadium
- Game attendance: 55,606
- Game weather: 32 °F (0 °C); wind 15 mph

==== Week 9 ====
Team	1	2	3	4	Total
Giants	7	0	0	0	7
• Bears	0	20	7	7	34

- Date: November 12
- Location: Wrigley Field
- Game attendance: 46,223
- Game weather: 51 °F (11 °C); wind 15 mph

==== Week 10 ====
Team	1	2	3	4	Total
Cardinals	3	0	0	0	3
• Bears	7	20	3	0	30

- Date: November 19
- Location: Wrigley Field
- Game attendance: 47,147
- Game weather: 33 °F (1 °C); wind 10 mph

==== Week 11 ====
Team	1	2	3	4	Total
• Packers	7	7	3	0	17
Bears	7	3	0	3	13

- Date: November 26
- Location: Wrigley Field
- Game attendance: 47,513
- Game weather: 39 °F (4 °C); wind 14 mph

==== Week 12 ====
Team	1	2	3	4	Total
• Bears	7	7	14	0	28
49ers	0	0	7	7	14

- Date: December 3
- Location: Kezar Stadium
- Game attendance: 25,613
- Game weather: 53 °F (12 °C); wind 13 mph

==== Week 13 ====
Team	1	2	3	4	Total
Vikings	0	7	0	3	10
Bears	3	0	7	0	10

- Date: December 10
- Location: Wrigley Field
- Game attendance: 40,110
- Game weather: 37 °F (3 °C); wind 15 mph

Scoring summary
Q1	CHI	Percival 12 yard field goal	CHI 3–0
Q2	MIN	Phillips 35 yard pass from Kapp (Cox kick)	MIN 7–3
Q3	CHI	Sayers 7 yard run (Percival kick)	CHI 10–3
Q4	MIN	Cox 25 yard field goal	Tie 10–10

==== Week 14 ====
Team	1	2	3	4	Total
• Bears	7	10	3	3	23
Falcons	7	0	0	7	14

- Date: December 17
- Location: Atlanta Stadium
- Game attendance: 54,107
- Game weather: 46 °F (8 °C); wind 7 mph

=== Standings ===
NFL Central
	W	L	T	PCT	DIV	CONF	PF	PA	STK
Green Bay Packers	9	4	1	.692	4–1–1	6–3–1	332	209	L2
Chicago Bears	7	6	1	.538	3–2–1	5–4–1	239	218	W1
Detroit Lions	5	7	2	.417	1–3–2	3–5–2	260	259	W2
Minnesota Vikings	3	8	3	.273	1–3–2	1–6–3	233	294	L1

Note: Tie games were not officially counted in the standings until 1972.
