= Chuck Latourette =

American football player (1945–1982)

No. 26
- Position: Punter / Return specialist

Personal information
- Born: July 21, 1945; San Antonio, Texas, U.S.
- Died: December 21, 1982 (aged 37); Houston, Texas, U.S.
- Listed height: 6 ft 0 in (1.83 m)
- Listed weight: 190 lb (86 kg)

Career information
- College: Rice
- NFL draft: 1967: undrafted

Career history
- St. Louis Cardinals (1967–1971)

Awards and highlights
- NFL kickoff return yards leader (1968); Second-team All-American (1966); First-team All-SWC (1966)

Career NFL statistics
- Punts: 248
- Punting yards: 10,049
- Punting average: 40.5
- Return yards: 2,028
- Stats at Pro Football Reference

Charles Pierre Latourette (July 21, 1945 – December 21, 1982) was an American professional football player who was a punter and return specialist for the St. Louis Cardinals of the National Football League (NFL). He played college football for the Rice Owls.

== Early life ==
Latourette attended Jonesboro high school where he played football. Latourette was an All-American and All-Southwest Conference as a defensive back.

== Professional career ==
In 1967, Latourette signed with the St. Louis Cardinals and selected as the Cardinals' Rookie of the Year. On September 29, 1968, Latourette set the NFL record for punt return average in a single game against the New Orleans Saints.

== Retirement ==
In 1972, Latourette announced his retirement from the National Football League following his graduation of the University of Tennessee as a medical student where he attended during his career in the National Football League.

== Death ==
On December 21, 1982, Latourette died from a single gunshot wound to his eye in the bedroom of his apartment. Latourette was a radiologist at the time of his death. Prior to his death, on July 30, 1981, Latourette previously survived a hang gliding accident in which he suffered broken arms and ribs.
