= List of Harvard Crimson in the NFL draft =

This is a list of Harvard Crimson football players in the NFL draft.

== Key ==
B	Back	K	Kicker	NT	Nose tackle
C	Center	LB	Linebacker	FB	Fullback
DB	Defensive back	P	Punter	HB	Halfback
DE	Defensive end	QB	Quarterback	WR	Wide receiver
DT	Defensive tackle	RB	Running back	G	Guard
E	End	T	Offensive tackle	TE	Tight end

== Selections ==
Year	Round	Pick	Overall	Player	Team	Position
1942	17	8	158	Verne Miller	New York Giants	T
1945	29	4	300	John Fisher	Boston Yanks	C
1946	29	7	277	Bill Fisher	Philadelphia Eagles	T
1950	28	10	362	Jim Kenary	Chicago Bears	B
1954	12	8	141	Dick Clasby	Philadelphia Eagles	B
1954	27	1	314	John Culver	Chicago Cardinals	B
1967	7	21	180	Bobby Leo	Boston Patriots	RB
1967	12	20	310	Dave David	Boston Patriots	T
1968	13	20	347	Carter Lord	Dallas Cowboys	WR
1973	17	5	421	Eric Crone	St. Louis Cardinals	QB
1975	5	16	120	Pat McInally	Cincinnati Bengals	WR
1976	6	5	161	Dan Jiggetts	Chicago Bears	T
1981	11	19	295	Brian Buckley	New England Patriots	QB
1984	10	11	263	Joe Azelby	Buffalo Bills	LB
1985	5	5	117	Roger Caron	Indianapolis Colts	T
1989	11	15	294	Tony Hinz	New England Patriots	RB
1998	6	20	173	Matt Birk	Minnesota Vikings	T
2000	4	25	119	Isaiah Kacyvenski	Seattle Seahawks	LB
2005	7	36	250	Ryan Fitzpatrick	St. Louis Rams	QB
2013	4	33	130	Kyle Juszczyk	Baltimore Ravens	FB
2016	5	33	170	Cole Toner	Arizona Cardinals	T
