= Gary Bugenhagen =

American football player (born 1945)

No. 76, 71, 67
- Positions: Tackle, Guard

Personal information
- Born: February 6, 1945 (age 81); Buffalo, New York, U.S.
- Listed height: 6 ft 2 in (1.88 m)
- Listed weight: 240 lb (109 kg)

Career information
- High school: Clarence (NY)
- College: Syracuse (1965-1966)
- NFL draft: 1967: 4th round, 102nd overall pick

Career history
- Buffalo Bills (1967); Indianapolis Capitols (1969); Boston Patriots (1970)

Awards and highlights
- First-team All-American (1966); First-team All-East (1966)

Career NFL/AFL statistics
- Games played: 24
- Games started: 8
- Stats at Pro Football Reference

Gary Alan Bugenhagen (born February 6, 1945) is an American former professional football player who was an offensive lineman in the American Football League (AFL) and National Football League (NFL). He was selected by the Buffalo Bills in the fourth round draft pick (#102 overall) of the 1967 NFL/AFL draft. He played offensive tackle there in 1967 and also playing with the Boston Patriots in 1970. He also played with Indianapolis Capitols of the Continental Football League (COFL). Bugenhagen served in the United States Air Force during the Vietnam War.
