= Pete Larson (American football) =

American football player (born 1944)

No. 24
- Position: Running back

Personal information
- Born: May 30, 1944 (age 82); Wilmington, Delaware, U.S.
- Listed height: 6 ft 1 in (1.85 m)
- Listed weight: 200 lb (91 kg)

Career information
- High school: Paxton (Paxton, Illinois)
- College: Cornell (1963-1966)
- NFL draft: 1967: 9th round, 222nd overall pick

Career history
- Virginia Sailors (1967); Washington Redskins (1967–1968)

Awards and highlights
- Second-team All-East (1966)

Career NFL statistics
- Rushing yards: 216
- Rushing average: 3.1
- Receptions: 20
- Receiving yards: 191
- Total touchdowns: 3
- Stats at Pro Football Reference

Harry Peter Larson, III (born May 30, 1944) is an American former professional football player who was a running back for the Washington Redskins of the National Football League (NFL). He played high school football for the Paxton Mustangs in Paxton, Illinois, one year for the Loomis Chaffee School (Windsor, CT) Pelicans and college football for the Cornell Big Red. During his senior year at Cornell, Larson was elected to the Sphinx Head Society.
