= Sharron Washington =

American gridiron football player (born 1943)

Profile
- Position: Halfback

Personal information
- Born: January 29, 1943 (age 83); St. Louis, Missouri, U.S.
- Listed height: 6 ft 0 in (1.83 m)
- Listed weight: 195 lb (88 kg)

Career information
- College: Northeast Missouri State
- NFL draft: 1967: 8th round, 201st overall pick

Career history
- 1967: Hamilton Tiger-Cats

Awards and highlights
- Grey Cup champion (1967)

Sharron Dennis Washington (born January 29, 1943) is an American former professional football player who played for the Hamilton Tiger-Cats. He won the Grey Cup with them in 1967. He previously played college football at Northeast Missouri State University from 1963 to 1966. Washington was picked in the 1967 NFL draft by the Houston Oilers (#201 overall).
