= George Gaiser =

American football player (born 1945)

No. 64
- Positions: Tackle, Guard

Personal information
- Born: May 9, 1945 (age 81); San Antonio, Texas, U.S.
- Listed height: 6 ft 4 in (1.93 m)
- Listed weight: 255 lb (116 kg)

Career information
- High school: Thomas Jefferson (San Antonio)
- College: SMU (1963-1966)
- NFL draft: 1967: 7th round, 181st overall pick

Career history
- Denver Broncos (1968)

Awards and highlights
- First-team All-SWC (1966)

Career AFL statistics
- Games played: 10
- Games started: 7
- Fumble recoveries: 1
- Stats at Pro Football Reference

George Gaiser (born May 9, 1945) is an American former professional football player who was a tackle and guard for the Denver Broncos of the American Football League (AFL) in 1968. He played college football for the SMU Mustangs.
