= Dave Olerich =

American football player (born 1944)

No. 22, 84, 51, 37
- Positions: Linebacker, Tight end

Personal information
- Born: November 14, 1944 (age 81); Elmhurst, Illinois, U.S.
- Listed height: 6 ft 1 in (1.85 m)
- Listed weight: 220 lb (100 kg)

Career information
- High school: Menlo-Atherton (Atherton, California)
- College: San Francisco (1964-1965)
- NFL draft: 1967: undrafted

Career history
- San Jose Apaches (1967); San Francisco 49ers (1967–1968); St. Louis Cardinals (1969–1970); Houston Oilers (1971); San Francisco 49ers (1972–1973); The Hawaiians (1974-1975)

Career NFL statistics
- Fumble recoveries: 2
- Sacks: 0.5
- Receptions: 1
- Receiving yards: 2
- Stats at Pro Football Reference

Dave Olerich (born November 14, 1944) is an American former professional football player who was a linebacker for seven seasons with the San Francisco 49ers, St. Louis Cardinals, and Houston Oilers of the National Football League (NFL). He played college football for the San Francisco Dons.
