= 1966 All-Eastern football team =

American all-star college football team

The 1966 All-Eastern football team consists of American football players chosen by various selectors as the best players at each position among the Eastern colleges and universities during the 1966 NCAA University Division football season.

== Offense ==
=== Quarterback ===
- Mickey Beard, Dartmouth (AP-1)
- Steve Lindell, Army (AP-2)

=== Halfbacks ===
- Floyd Little, Syracuse (AP-1)
- Bobby Leo, Harvard (AP-1)
- Terry Murray, Navy (AP-2)
- Pete Larson, Cornell (AP-2)

=== Fullback ===
- Larry Csonka, Syracuse (AP-1)
- Pete Walton, Dartmouth (AP-2)

=== Ends ===
- Rob Taylor, Navy (AP-1)
- Jack Emmer, Rutgers (AP-1)
- Jack Curry, Penn State (AP-2)
- Bob Longo, Pittsburgh (AP-2)

=== Tackles ===
- Gary Bugenhagen, Syracuse (AP-1)
- Steve Diamond, Harvard (AP-1)
- Reeve Vanneman, Cornell (AP-2)
- Paul Maczuzak, Bucknell (AP-2)

=== Guards ===
- Bob Hyland, Boston College (AP-1)
- Bill Benecick, Syracuse (AP-1)
- Roy Lawrence, Connecticut (AP-2)
- Mike Donovan, Northeastern (AP-2)

=== Center ===
- Chuck Matuszak, Dartmouth (AP-1)
- Harry Dittmann, Navy (AP-2)

== Defense ==
=== Ends ===
- Bill Dow, Navy (AP-1)
- Herb Stacker, Syracuse (AP-1)
- Norris Clark, Colgate (AP-2)
- Bud Neswiacheny, Army (AP-2)

=== Tackles ===
- Bob Greenlee, Yale (AP-1)
- Roy Norton, Boston University (AP-1)
- Dave Rowe, Penn State (AP-2)
- Tom Schwartz, Army (AP-2)

=== Middle guard ===
- Mike Reid, Penn State (AP-1)
- Glenn Grieco, Holy Cross (AP-2)

=== Linebackers ===
- Townsend Clarke, Army (AP-1)
- Jim Flanigan, Pittsburgh (AP-1)
- Ray Ilg, Colgate (AP-1)
- Don Downing, Navy (AP-2)
- John Runnells, Penn State (AP-2)
- John Huard, Maine (AP-2)

=== Backs ===
- Tom Wilson, Colgate (AP-1)
- Wynn Mabry, Dartmouth (AP-1)
- Don Dietz, Army (AP-1)
- Doug James, Princeton (AP-2)
- Tim Montgomery, Penn State (AP-2)
- Tony Kyasky, Syracuse (AP-2)

== Key ==
- AP = Associated Press
- UPI = United Press International

== See also ==
- 1966 College Football All-America Team
