= Ray Ilg =

American football player (born 1945)

No. 45, 52
- Position: Linebacker

Personal information
- Born: November 25, 1945 (age 80); Wellesley, Massachusetts, U.S.
- Listed height: 6 ft 1 in (1.85 m)
- Listed weight: 220 lb (100 kg)

Career information
- High school: Wellesley
- College: Colgate (1963–1966)
- AFL draft: 1967: 13th round, 336th overall pick

Career history
- Boston Patriots (1967–1968); Quincy Giants (1969); Hartford Knights (1970)

Awards and highlights
- 2× First-team All-East (1965, 1966)

Career AFL statistics
- Sacks: 1
- Stats at Pro Football Reference

Raymond Arthur Ilg III (born November 25, 1945) is an American former professional football player who was a linebacker for two seasons with the Boston Patriots of the American Football League (AFL). He played college football for the Colgate Raiders and was selected by the Patriots in the 13th round of the 1967 NFL/AFL draft.

== Early life and college ==
Raymond Arthur Ilg III was born on November 25, 1945, in Wellesley, Massachusetts. He attended Wellesley High School in Wellesley.

Ilg was a member of the Colgate Raiders of Colgate University from 1963 to 1966 and a three-year letterman from 1964 to 1966. He was named first-team All-East by the Associated Press in both 1965 and 1966. He was also a three-year letterman in baseball for Colgate. Ilg was inducted into the school's athletics hall of fame in 1984.

== Professional career ==
Ilg was selected by the Boston Patriots in the 13th round, with the 336th overall pick, of the 1967 NFL draft. He signed with the Patriots on May 25, 1967. He played in all 14 games, starting five, for the Patriots during the 1967 season, recording one sack and one kick return for ten yards. Ilg appeared in all 14 games for the second straight season, starting one, in 1968. He wore jersey number 45 while with the Patriots. He was released in 1969.

Ilg was a member of the Quincy Giants of the Atlantic Coast Football League (ACFL) in 1969. He wore number 52 with the Giants. He played for the Hartford Knights of the ACFL in 1970 and returned one interception for 24 yards.
