= 1966 All-Southwest Conference football team =

American college football all-star team

The 1966 All-Southwest Conference football team consists of American football players chosen by various organizations for All-Southwest Conference teams for the 1966 NCAA University Division football season. The selectors for the 1966 season included the Associated Press (AP) and United Press International (UPI).

== All Southwest selections ==
=== Offense ===
==== Quarterbacks ====
- Mac White, SMU (AP)
- Jon Brittenum, Arkansas (UPI)

==== Halfbacks ====
- Wendell Housley, Texas A&M (AP; UPI)
- Chris Gilbert, Texas (AP; UPI) (CHFOF)
- David Dickey, Arkansas (UPI)

==== Fullbacks ====
- Lester Lehman, Rice (AP)

==== Ends ====
- Larry Gilbert, Texas Tech (AP; UPI)
- Jerry LeVias, SMU (AP; UPI) (CFHOF)

==== Tackles ====
- George Gaiser, SMU (AP; UPI)
- Mo Moorman, Texas A&M (AP)
- Dick Cunningham, Arkansas (AP)

==== Guards ====
- Lynn Thornhill, SMU (AP; UPI)
- Howard Goad, Texas (AP)
- Jim Swanson, Rice (UPI)

==== Centers ====
- Melvin Gibbs, Arkansas (AP)
- Charles Standifer, SMU (UPI)

=== Defense ===
==== Defensive ends ====
- Hartford Hamilton, Arkansas (AP; UPI)
- Corbin Robertson, Texas (AP)

==== Defensive tackles ====
- Loyd Phillips, Arkansas (AP; UPI) (CFHOF)
- Mike Bratcher, TCU (AP)
- Ronnye Medlen, SMU (UPI)

==== Defensive guards ====
- Greg Pipes, Baylor (AP; UPI)
- John LaGrone, SMU (AP; UPI)
- Doyle Johnson, TCU (UPI)

==== Linebackers ====
- Billy Bob Stewart, SMU (AP; UPI)
- Jerry Griffin, SMU (AP; UPI)
- Joel Brame, Texas (UPI)

==== Defensive halfbacks ====
- Frank Horak, TCU (AP; UPI)
- Martine Bercher, Arkansas (AP; UPI)

==== Safeties ====
- Chuck Latourette, Rice (AP; UPI)

== Key ==
AP = Associated Press

UPI = United Press International

CFHOF = Player inducted into the College Football Hall of Fame

== See also ==
- 1966 College Football All-America Team
