= Phil Spiller =

American football player (born 1945)

No. 19, 42, 48
- Position: Defensive back

Personal information
- Born: April 2, 1945 (age 81); Santa Monica, California, U.S.
- Listed height: 6 ft 0 in (1.83 m)
- Listed weight: 195 lb (88 kg)

Career information
- High school: Newport Harbor (Newport Beach, California)
- College: Los Angeles State (1966)
- NFL draft: 1967: 16th round, 410th overall pick

Career history
- St. Louis Cardinals (1967); Atlanta Falcons (1968); Cincinnati Bengals (1968)

Career NFL/AFL statistics
- Interceptions: 2
- Sacks: 1
- Stats at Pro Football Reference

Philip Alan Spiller (born April 2, 1945) is a former National Football League (NFL) player. He was drafted in the 16th round (410th overall) of the 1967 NFL/AFL draft by the St. Louis Football Cardinals as a defensive back. He played the 1967 and part of the 1968 seasons for St. Louis, but was traded in 1968 to the 1st year fledgling expansion team the AFC Cincinnati Bengals and to the 2nd year NFC Atlanta Falcons.

Spiller was a college standout in 1965 and 1966 as a player for the nationally ranked Cal State Los Angeles Diablos. The 1966 team was undefeated and nationally ranked by the UPI and AP sportswriters.

Spiller only played a few seasons in the NFL. He retired and became a builder and developer having graduated from Cal State LA with a degree in Real Estate. He has been married 4 times and has 3 children.
