= Bob Hyland =

American football player (born 1945)

No. 50, 70, 55, 60
- Positions: Center, Guard

Personal information
- Born: July 21, 1945 (age 81); White Plains, New York, U.S.
- Listed height: 6 ft 5 in (1.96 m)
- Listed weight: 255 lb (116 kg)

Career information
- High school: Archbishop Stepinac (White Plains)
- College: Boston College (1963-1966)
- NFL draft: 1967: 1st round, 9th overall pick

Career history
- Green Bay Packers (1967–1969); Chicago Bears (1970); New York Giants (1971–1975); Green Bay Packers (1976); New England Patriots (1977)

Awards and highlights
- Super Bowl champion (II); NFL champion (1967); Second-team All-American (1966); First-team All-East (1966)

Career NFL statistics
- Games played: 136
- Games started: 60
- Fumble recoveries: 2
- Stats at Pro Football Reference

Robert Joseph Hyland (born July 21, 1945) is an American former professional football player who was a guard and center center for 11 seasons in the National Football League (NFL) for the Green Bay Packers, Chicago Bears, New York Giants, and the New England Patriots. He played college football for the Boston College Eagles and was selected in the first round (ninth overall) of the 1967 NFL/AFL draft. He played high school football at Archbishop Stepinac (Class of 1963).

Hyland owned the now-defunct Sports Page pub and Sports Page in White Plains, New York.

In March 2011, Hyland ran as the Republican candidate for mayor of White Plains, New York, in the wake of mayor Adam Bradley's resignation. He was defeated by Thomas Roach.
