= Bill Seman =

American gridiron football player (1944–2021)

Profile
- Position: Guard

Personal information
- Born: March 31, 1944; Springfield, Illinois, U.S.
- Died: June 6, 2021 (aged 77); Sherman, Illinois, U.S.
- Listed height: 6 ft 2 in (1.88 m)
- Listed weight: 235 lb (107 kg)

Career information
- High school: Springfield
- College: Northeast Missouri State
- NFL draft: 1967: 16th round, 395th overall pick

Career history
- 1967: Hamilton Tiger-Cats

Awards and highlights
- Grey Cup champion - 1967

William Luke Seman (March 31, 1944 – June 6, 2021) was a Grey Cup champion and guard in the Canadian Football League (CFL).

A Truman Bulldog, Seman played one season (5 games) with the Hamilton Tiger-Cats, part of the Grey Cup winning team in 1967. He was selected to the Truman State University All-Century Football Team in 2000.
