= Terry Stoepel =

American football player (1945–2016)

No. 89, 69
- Position: Tight end

Personal information
- Born: February 8, 1945; Cincinnati, Ohio
- Died: February 12, 2016 (aged 71); Justin, Texas
- Listed height: 6 ft 4 in (1.93 m)
- Listed weight: 235 lb (107 kg)

Career information
- High school: Richardson (TX)
- College: Tulsa
- NFL draft: 1967: undrafted

Career history
- Chicago Bears (1967); Houston Oilers (1970)
- Stats at Pro Football Reference

Terry Stoepel (February 8, 1945 – February 12, 2016) was an American football tight end. He played for the Chicago Bears in 1967 and for the Houston Oilers in 1970.

He died on February 12, 2016, in Justin, Texas at age 71.
