= Larry Hendershot =

American football player (1944–2018)

No. 54, 62, 63
- Position: Linebacker

Personal information
- Born: January 15, 1944 (age 82); Indianapolis, Indiana, U.S.
- Listed height: 6 ft 3 in (1.91 m)
- Listed weight: 240 lb (109 kg)

Career information
- High school: Washington (Phoenix, Arizona)
- College: Arizona State (1964-1966)
- NFL draft: 1967: 8th round, 190th overall pick

Career history
- Washington Redskins (1967); Virginia Sailors (1967-1968); Roanoke Buckskins (1969)

Career NFL statistics
- Fumble recoveries: 1
- Stats at Pro Football Reference

Larry Leland Hendershot (1944–2018) was an American football linebacker in the National Football League (NFL) for the Washington Redskins. He played college football at Arizona State University and was drafted in the eighth round of the 1967 NFL/AFL draft.

Hendershot was born January 15, 1944, in Indianapolis, Indiana. He grew up in Phoenix, Arizona, and attended Washington High School. Hendershot set the Arizona State High School record in the shot put at 65'6.00".

After one year with the Washington Redskins, Hendershot was drafted into the US Army, where he served as a cook. He later worked in real estate and property management. He died 27 July 2018.
