= Andy Gross (American football) =

American football player (born 1945)

No. 64
- Position: Guard

Personal information
- Born: October 13, 1945 (age 81); Burkam, Austria, U.S.
- Listed height: 6 ft 0 in (1.83 m)
- Listed weight: 230 lb (104 kg)

Career information
- High school: Thomas Jefferson
- College: Auburn
- NFL draft: 1967: undrafted

Career history
- New York Giants (1967–1968); Alabama Hawks (1969)
- Stats at Pro Football Reference

Andrew Gross (born October 13, 1945) is an American former professional football player who was a guard for the New York Giants of the National Football League (NFL). He played college football for the Auburn University.

His brother, George, also played professional football.
