= 1967 NFL/AFL draft =

National Football League draft

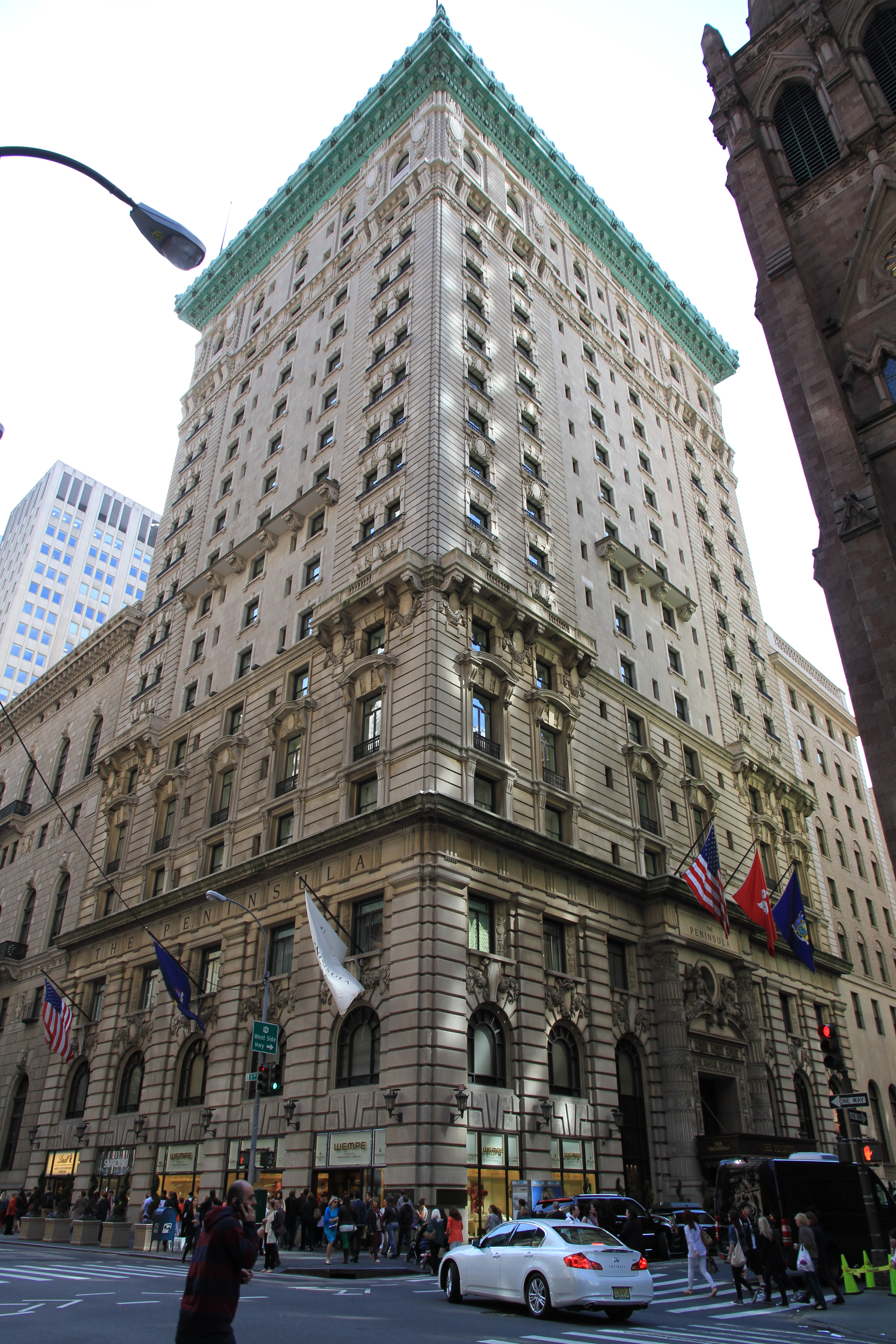
- The former Gotham Hotel (draft location), photographed in 2013

General information
- Date: March 14–15, 1967
- Time: 10 am EST
- Location: Gotham Hotel in New York City

Overview
- 445 total selections in 17 rounds
- League: NFL, AFL
- First selection: Bubba Smith, DT; Baltimore Colts
- Most selections (36): New Orleans Saints
- Fewest selections (11): Los Angeles Rams
- Hall of Famers: 10: QB Bob Griese; RB Floyd Little; DT Alan Page; OG Gene Upshaw; CB Lem Barney; LB Willie Lanier; OT Rayfield Wright; DB Ken Houston; K Jan Stenerud; OT Larry Little

The 1967 NFL/AFL draft was conducted March 14–15, 1967, at the Gotham Hotel in New York City. It was the first common draft between the National Football League (NFL) and the American Football League (AFL), part of the AFL–NFL merger agreement of June 1966.

This draft was delayed as new guidelines were established; redshirt (or "future") players were no longer eligible. It began on a Tuesday in mid-March (first five rounds); the previous two years the leagues held their separate drafts on the final Saturday of November, immediately following the college football regular season.

The expansion New Orleans Saints initially had the first overall pick; a week before the draft, they traded it to the Baltimore Colts, who selected defensive end Bubba Smith of Michigan State.

== Player selections ==
= Pro Bowl	= AFL All-Star	= Hall of Fame

=== Round 1 ===
Pick #	NFL team	Player	Position	College
1	Baltimore Colts NFL (from New Orleans)	Bubba Smith	Defensive tackle	Michigan State
2	Minnesota Vikings NFL (from New York Giants)	Clint Jones	Running back	Michigan State
3	San Francisco 49ers NFL (from Atlanta)	Steve Spurrier	Quarterback	Florida
4	Miami Dolphins AFL	Bob Griese	Quarterback	Purdue
5	Houston Oilers AFL	George Webster	Linebacker	Michigan State
6	Denver Broncos AFL	Floyd Little	Halfback	Syracuse
7	Detroit Lions NFL	Mel Farr	Running back	UCLA
8	Minnesota Vikings NFL	Gene Washington	Wide receiver	Michigan State
9	Green Bay Packers NFL (from Pittsburgh)	Bob Hyland	Offensive guard	Boston College
10	Chicago Bears NFL	Loyd Phillips	Defensive end	Arkansas
11	San Francisco 49ers NFL	Cas Banaszek	Tackle	Northwestern
12	New York Jets AFL	Paul Seiler	Offensive guard	Notre Dame
13	Washington Redskins NFL	Ray McDonald	Running back	Idaho
14	San Diego Chargers AFL	Ron Billingsley	Defensive tackle	Wyoming
15	Minnesota Vikings NFL (from Los Angeles)	Alan Page	Defensive tackle	Notre Dame
16	St. Louis Cardinals NFL	Dave Williams	Wide receiver	Washington
17	Oakland Raiders AFL	Gene Upshaw	Offensive guard	Texas A&I
18	Cleveland Browns NFL	Bob Matheson	Linebacker	Duke
19	Philadelphia Eagles NFL	Harry Jones	Running back	Arkansas
20	Baltimore Colts NFL	Jim Detwiler	Running back	Michigan
21	Boston Patriots AFL	John Charles	Defensive back	Purdue
22	Buffalo Bills AFL	John Pitts	Defensive back	Arizona State
23	Houston Oilers AFL	Tom Regner	Offensive guard	Notre Dame
24	Kansas City Chiefs AFL	Gene Trosch	Defensive tackle	Miami (FL)
25	Green Bay Packers NFL	Don Horn	Quarterback	San Diego State
26	New Orleans Saints NFL	Leslie Kelley	Fullback	Alabama

=== Round 2 ===
Pick #	NFL team	Player	Position	College
27	New Orleans Saints	Bo Burris	Defensive back	Houston
28	Minnesota Vikings (from New York Giants)	Bob Grim	Running back	Oregon State
29	Miami Dolphins	Jim Riley	Defensive end	Oklahoma
30	Houston Oilers	Bob Davis	Quarterback	Virginia
31	Atlanta Falcons	Leo Carroll	Defensive end	San Diego State
32	Denver Broncos	Tom Beer	Tight end	Houston
33	Los Angeles Rams	Willie Ellison	Running back	Texas Southern
34	Detroit Lions	Lem Barney	Cornerback	Jackson State
35	Pittsburgh Steelers	Don Shy	Running back	San Diego State
36	Chicago Bears	Bob Jones	Defensive back	San Diego State
37	New York Jets	Rich Sheron	Tight end	Washington State
38	Washington Redskins	Spain Musgrove	Defensive tackle	Utah State
39	San Francisco 49ers	Tom Holzer	Tackle	Louisville
40	San Diego Chargers	Ron McCall	Linebacker	Weber State
41	Green Bay Packers	Dave Dunaway	Wide receiver	Duke
42	Buffalo Bills	Jim LeMoine	Tight end	Utah State
43	St. Louis Cardinals	Bob Rowe	Defensive end	Western Michigan
44	Philadelphia Eagles	John Brooks	Guard	Kent State
45	Baltimore Colts	Rick Volk	Defensive back	Michigan
46	Cleveland Browns	Larry Conjar	Running back	Notre Dame
47	Kansas City Chiefs	Jim Lynch	Linebacker	Notre Dame
48	San Diego Chargers	Bob Howard	Defensive back	San Diego State
49	Houston Oilers	Roy Hopkins	Running back	Texas Southern
50	Kansas City Chiefs	Willie Lanier	Linebacker	Morgan State
51	Green Bay Packers	Jim Flanigan	Linebacker	Pittsburgh
52	New Orleans Saints	John Gilliam	Wide receiver	South Carolina State
53	New Orleans Saints	Dave Rowe	Tackle	Penn State

=== Round 3 ===
Pick #	NFL team	Player	Position	College
54	Baltimore Colts	Norman Davis	Tackle	Grambling
55	Cleveland Browns	Don Cockroft	Kicker	Adams State
56	Houston Oilers	Larry Carwell	Defensive back	Iowa State
57	Atlanta Falcons	Jimmy Jordan	Running back	Florida
58	Denver Broncos	Mike Current	Tackle	Ohio State
59	Denver Broncos	George Goeddeke	Center	Notre Dame
60	Detroit Lions	Paul Naumoff	Linebacker	Tennessee
61	Minnesota Vikings	Earl Denny	Wide receiver	Missouri
62	San Francisco 49ers	Frank Nunley	Linebacker	Michigan
63	Chicago Bears	Garry Lyle	Running back	George Washington
64	Washington Redskins	Curg Belcher	Defensive back	Brigham Young
65	San Francisco 49ers	Bill Tucker	Running back	Tennessee State
66	New York Jets	Dennis Randall	Defensive end	Oklahoma State
67	San Diego Chargers	Harold Akin	Tackle	Oklahoma State
68	Philadelphia Eagles	Harry Wilson	Running back	Nebraska
69	St. Louis Cardinals	Vidal Carlin	Quarterback	North Texas State
70	Buffalo Bills	Tom Rhoads	Defensive end	Notre Dame
71	Baltimore Colts	Leon Ward	Linebacker	Oklahoma State
72	Cleveland Browns	Eppie Barney	Wide receiver	Iowa State
73	Pittsburgh Steelers	Rockne "Rocky" Freitas	Center	Oregon State
74	New York Jets	Henry King	Defensive back	Utah State
75	Oakland Raiders	Bill Fairband	Linebacker	Colorado
76	Dallas Cowboys	Phil Clark	Defensive back	Northwestern
77	Kansas City Chiefs	Billy Masters	Tight end	LSU
78	Green Bay Packers	John Rowser	Defensive back	Michigan
79	New Orleans Saints	Del Williams	Center	Florida State
80	New Orleans Saints	Ben Hart	Running back	Oklahoma

=== Round 4 ===
Pick #	NFL team	Player	Position	College
81	New Orleans Saints	Ron Widby	Kicker	Tennessee
82	New York Giants	Louis Thompson	Defensive tackle	Alabama
83	Cleveland Browns	Carl Ward	Running back	Michigan
84	Miami Dolphins	Bob Greenlee	Tackle	Yale
85	Denver Broncos	Carl Cunningham	Defensive end	Houston
86	Houston Oilers	Carel Stith	Tackle	Nebraska
87	Minnesota Vikings	Alvin Coleman	Defensive back	Tennessee State
88	Detroit Lions	Lew Kamanu	Defensive end	Weber State
89	Pittsburgh Steelers	Ray May	Linebacker	USC
90	Chicago Bears	Al Dodd	Defensive back	N.W. Louisiana
91	San Francisco 49ers	Wayne Trimble	Defensive back	Alabama
92	New York Jets	Julian Gray	Defensive back	Grambling
93	Green Bay Packers	Travis Williams	Running back	Arizona State
94	San Diego Chargers	Dickie Post	Running back	Houston
95	Chicago Bears	Tom Greenlee	Defensive back	Washington
96	Oakland Raiders	James Roy Jackson	Wide receiver	Oklahoma
97	St. Louis Cardinals	Mike Barnes	Defensive back	Arlington State
98	Cleveland Browns	Joe Taffoni	Tackle	Tennessee-Martin
99	Philadelphia Eagles	Chuck Hughes	Wide receiver	Texas Western
100	Baltimore Colts	Charlie Stukes	Running back	Maryland State
101	Boston Patriots	Ed Philpott	Defensive end	Miami (OH)
102	Buffalo Bills	Gary Bugenhagen	Tackle	Syracuse
103	Dallas Cowboys	Curtis Marker	Guard	Northern Michigan
104	Kansas City Chiefs	Ron Zwernemann	Guard	East Texas State
105	St. Louis Cardinals	Andy Bowling	Linebacker	Virginia Tech
106	New Orleans Saints	Bill Carr	Center	Florida
107	New Orleans Saints	Tom Stangle	Tackle	Dayton

=== Round 5 ===
Pick #	NFL team	Player	Position	College
108	New Orleans Saints	Don McCall	Running back	USC
109	New York Giants	Dave Lewis	Running back	Stanford
110	Denver Broncos	Fran Lynch	Running back	Hofstra
111	Houston Oilers	Pete Johns	Defensive back	Tulane
112	Atlanta Falcons	Bill Delaney	Tight end	American International
113	Denver Broncos	John Huard	Linebacker	Maine
114	Philadelphia Eagles	Bob Van Pelt	Center	Indiana
115	Minnesota Vikings	Ken Last	Wide receiver	Minnesota
116	Green Bay Packers	Dwight Hood	Defensive tackle	Baylor
117	New York Jets	Louis Jackson	Defensive back	Grambling
118	Houston Oilers	Willie Parker	Defensive tackle	Arkansas AM&N
119	Chicago Bears	Bruce Alford	Kicker	Texas Christian
120	Atlanta Falcons	Randy Matson	Defensive tackle	Texas A&M
121	San Diego Chargers	Bernard Erickson	Linebacker	Abilene Christian
122	Los Angeles Rams	Nate Shaw	Defensive back	USC
123	St. Louis Cardinals	Jamie Rivers	Tight end	Bowling Green
124	Oakland Raiders	Gerald Warfield	Running back	Mississippi
125	Philadelphia Eagles	Dick Absher	Tight end	Maryland
126	Baltimore Colts	Ron Porter	Linebacker	Idaho
127	Houston Oilers	Zeke Moore	Defensive back	Lincoln
128	Boston Patriots	Melvin Witt	Defensive end	Arlington State
129	Miami Dolphins	Gary Tucker	Running back	Chattanooga
130	Green Bay Packers	Richard Tate	Defensive back	Utah
131	Oakland Raiders	Mike Hibler	Linebacker	Stanford
132	Green Bay Packers	Jay Bachman	Center	Cincinnati
133	New Orleans Saints	John Douglas	Defensive back	Texas Southern

=== Round 6 ===
Pick #	NFL team	Player	Position	College
134	New Orleans Saints	George Harvey	Guard	Kansas
135	Washington Redskins	Don Bandy	Tackle	Tulsa
136	Houston Oilers	Pete Barnes	Linebacker	Southern
137	Baltimore Colts	Terry Southall	Quarterback	Baylor
138	Miami Dolphins	Bud Norris	Tight end	Washington State
139	Denver Broncos	Neal Sweeney	Wide receiver	Tulsa
140	Pittsburgh Steelers	Mike Haggerty	Tackle	Miami (FL)
141	Detroit Lions	Tim Jones	Quarterback	Weber State
142	Chicago Bears	Virgil Carter	Quarterback	Brigham Young
143	Chicago Bears	Doug Kriewald	Guard	W. Texas State
144	Detroit Lions	John McCambridge	Defensive end	Northwestern
145	San Francisco 49ers	Doug Cunningham	Running back	Mississippi
146	New York Jets	Jeff Richardson	Defensive end	Michigan State
147	San Diego Chargers	Nate Johns	Wide receiver	San Diego State
148	Atlanta Falcons	Eugene Snipes	Running back	Elizabeth City
149	Buffalo Bills	Bill Wilderson	Defensive end	Texas Western
150	St. Louis Cardinals	Mike Campbell	Running back	Lenoir-Rhyne
151	Atlanta Falcons	Martine Bercher	Defensive back	Arkansas
152	Cleveland Browns	John Demarie	Defensive end	LSU
153	Philadelphia Eagles	Bob Hughes	Defensive end	Jackson State
154	Boston Patriots	Ron Medlen	Defensive end	Southern Methodist
155	Oakland Raiders	Rick Egloff	Quarterback	Wyoming
156	Kansas City Chiefs	Noland Smith	Running back	Tennessee State
157	Dallas Cowboys	Sims Stokes	Wide receiver	Northern Arizona
158	Green Bay Packers	Steward Williams	Running back	Bowling Green
159	New Orleans Saints	Bo Wood	Linebacker	North Carolina

=== Round 7 ===
Pick #	NFL team	Player	Position	College
160	New Orleans Saints	Gary Hertzog	Guard	Willamette
161	Green Bay Packers	Bob Ziolkowski	Tackle	Iowa
162	Atlanta Falcons	Corey Colehour	Quarterback	North Dakota
163	Miami Dolphins	Larry Seiple	Running back	Kentucky
164	Houston Oilers	Ed Carrington	Wide receiver	Virginia
165	Denver Broncos	Frank Richter	Guard	Georgia
166	Detroit Lions	Ted Tuinstra	Tackle	Iowa State
167	Minnesota Vikings	Bobby Bryant	Defensive back	South Carolina
168	Washington Redskins	Bruce Matte	Quarterback	Miami (OH)
169	Chicago Bears	John Truitt	Wide receiver	Indiana State
170	San Francisco 49ers	Milt Jackson	Defensive back	Tulsa
171	New York Jets	John Elliott	Guard	Texas
172	Washington Redskins	John Love	Wide receiver	North Texas State
173	San Diego Chargers	David Conway	Kicker	Texas
174	Philadelphia Eagles	John Williams	Defensive back	San Diego State
175	St. Louis Cardinals	Joe Randall	Kicker	Brown
176	Oakland Raiders	Ron Lewellen	Defensive tackle	Tennessee-Martin
177	Cleveland Browns	Bill House	Tackle	Youngstown State
178	Philadelphia Eagles	Bob Crenshaw	Guard	New Mexico State
179	Baltimore Colts	Bob Rein	Wide receiver	Ohio State
180	Boston Patriots	Bobby Leo	Running back	Harvard
181	Buffalo Bills	George Gaiser	Tackle	Southern Methodist
182	Dallas Cowboys	Rayfield Wright	Tackle	Ft. Valley State
183	Kansas City Chiefs	Dick Erickson	Center	Wisconsin-Stout
184	Green Bay Packers	Bill Powell	Linebacker	Missouri
185	New Orleans Saints	Bob McKelvey	Running back	Northwestern

=== Round 8 ===
Pick #	NFL team	Player	Position	College
186	New Orleans Saints	Sam Harris	Tight end	Colorado
187	New York Giants	Scott Eaton	Defensive back	Oregon State
188	Oakland Raiders	Estes Banks	Running back	Colorado
189	Houston Oilers	John Brunson	Running back	Benedict
190	Washington Redskins	Larry Hendershot	Guard	Arizona State
191	Denver Broncos	Tom Cassese	Wide receiver	C.W. Post
192	Pittsburgh Steelers	John Foruria	Quarterback	Idaho
193	St. Louis Cardinals	Mike Gold	Tackle	Utah State
194	Pittsburgh Steelers	Mike Barnes	Tackle	Purdue
195	Chicago Bears	Roger Murphy	Wide receiver	Northwestern
196	New York Jets	Gene Bledsoe	Guard	Texas
197	Minnesota Vikings	John Beasley	Wide receiver	California
198	San Francisco 49ers	Walter Johnson	Linebacker	Tuskegee
199	San Diego Chargers	John Mills	Wide receiver	Tennessee
200	Chicago Bears	Jerry Griffin	Linebacker	Southern Methodist
201	Houston Oilers	Sharon Washington	Wide receiver	N.E. Missouri
202	Baltimore Colts	Lee Anderson	Tackle	Bishop
203	Philadelphia Eagles	Don Klacking	Running back	Wyoming
204	Baltimore Colts	Cornelius Johnson	Linebacker	Virginia Union
205	Cleveland Browns	Bill Devrow	Defensive back	Southern Mississippi
206	Boston Patriots	Tom Fussell	Defensive tackle	LSU
207	Buffalo Bills	Tommy Luke	Defensive back	Mississippi
208	Dallas Cowboys	Steve Laub	Quarterback	Illinois Wesleyan
209	Kansas City Chiefs	Tom Altemeier	Tackle	Luther
210	Green Bay Packers	Clarence Miles	Defensive tackle	Trinity (TX)
211	New Orleans Saints	Barry Siler	Linebacker	Albion

=== Round 9 ===
Pick #	NFL team	Player	Position	College
212	New Orleans Saints	Tim Lavens	Tight end	Idaho
213	New York Giants	Fred Freeman	Tackle	Mississippi Valley
214	Houston Oilers	Ken Houston	Defensive back	Prairie View
215	Atlanta Falcons	Bob Moten	Wide receiver	Bishop
216	Miami Dolphins	John Richardson	Defensive tackle	UCLA
217	Denver Broncos	James Summers	Defensive back	Michigan State
218	Detroit Lions	Mike Weger	Defensive back	Bowling Green
219	Minnesota Vikings	Bill Morris	Guard	Holy Cross
220	Pittsburgh Steelers	Paul Otis	Defensive tackle	Houston
221	Chicago Bears	Greg Cass	Center	Washington
222	Washington Redskins	Pete Larson	Running back	Cornell
223	San Francisco 49ers	Bob Briggs	Tackle	Heidelberg
224	New York Jets	Ray Scott	Defensive end	Prairie View
225	San Diego Chargers	Steve Newell	Wide receiver	Long Beach State
226	Los Angeles Rams	Tommie Smith	Running back	San Jose State
227	St. Louis Cardinals	Ted Wheeler	Tight end	W. Texas State
228	Oakland Raiders	Mark DeVilling	Linebacker	Muskingum
229	Baltimore Colts	Ron Kirkland	Running back	Nebraska
230	Cleveland Browns	Cecil Dowdy	Linebacker	Alabama
231	Philadelphia Eagles	Harold Stancell	Defensive back	Tennessee
232	Boston Patriots	Charlie Thornhill	Defensive back	Michigan State
233	Buffalo Bills	Gerald Seither	Wide receiver	Kent State
234	Dallas Cowboys	Byron Morgan	Defensive back	Findlay
235	Kansas City Chiefs	Ed Pope	Defensive tackle	Jackson State
236	Green Bay Packers	Harlan Reed	Tight end	Mississippi State
237	New Orleans Saints	Eugene Ross	Defensive back	Oklahoma

=== Round 10 ===
Pick #	NFL team	Player	Position	College
238	New Orleans Saints	Charlie Brown	Wide receiver	Missouri
239	New York Giants	Dick Stebbins	Wide receiver	Grambling
240	Atlanta Falcons	Dick Schafroth	Tackle	Iowa State
241	Miami Dolphins	Tom Beier	Defensive back	Miami (FL)
242	Houston Oilers	Woodrow Campbell	Running back	Northwestern
243	Denver Broncos	Paul Krause	Quarterback	Dubuque
244	Minnesota Vikings	Pete Tatman	Running back	Nebraska
245	Detroit Lions	Jerry Hayhoe	Guard	USC
246	Pittsburgh Steelers	Bill Wilsey	Linebacker	Fresno State
247	Washington Redskins	Tim Houlton	Defensive tackle	St. Norbert
248	San Francisco 49ers	Phil "Chip" Myers	Wide receiver	Northwestern Oklahoma State
249	New York Jets	Raymond Brown	Defensive back	Alcorn A&M
250	Washington Redskins	Bruce Sullivan	Defensive back	Illinois
251	San Diego Chargers	Torre Ossmo	Tackle	Western Michigan
252	Los Angeles Rams	Leon Moore	Defensive back	Tennessee State
253	Oakland Raiders	Richard Sligh	Tackle	North Carolina College
254	St. Louis Cardinals	Lavern Barrs	Defensive back	Furman
255	Cleveland Browns	Jim Copeland	Guard	Virginia
256	Philadelphia Eagles	Maurice Bates	Defensive end	Northern (SD)
257	Boston Patriots	John Runnels	Linebacker	Penn State
258	Baltimore Colts	Leigh Gilbert	Tight end	Northern Illinois
259	Buffalo Bills	Tom Croft	Defensive back	Louisiana Tech
260	Dallas Cowboys	Eugens Bowens	Running back	Tennessee State
261	Houston Oilers	Tim Sheehan	Center	Stanford
262	Green Bay Packers	Bill Shear	Kicker	Cortland State
263	New Orleans Saints	Roosevelt Robertson	Wide receiver	North Carolina Central

=== Round 11 ===
Pick #	NFL team	Player	Position	College
264	New Orleans Saints	Jim Benson	Guard	Florida
265	New York Giants	Pete Pifer	Running back	Oregon State
266	Miami Dolphins	Jack Pyburn	Tackle	Texas A&M
267	Houston Oilers	Harold Decker	Defensive end	Kalamazoo
268	Atlanta Falcons	John Walker	Linebacker	Jackson State
269	Denver Broncos	Lou Andrus	Defensive end	Brigham Young
270	Detroit Lions	Ray Shirley	Tackle	Arizona State
271	Minnesota Vikings	Bob Trygstad	Defensive tackle	Washington State
272	Pittsburgh Steelers	Jim Whitcomb	Wide receiver	Emporia State
273	Chicago Bears	Earl Mayo	Running back	Morgan State
274	New York Jets	Herb Slattery	Guard	Delaware
275	Washington Redskins	Bill Brown	Center	Texas Western
276	San Francisco 49ers	Ken Carmann	Defensive tackle	Kearney (Neb.)
277	San Diego Chargers	Carroll Jarvis	Running back	Virginia
278	Los Angeles Rams	Frank Horak	Defensive back	Texas Christian
279	St. Louis Cardinals	Ed Marcontell	Guard	Lamar Tech
280	Oakland Raiders	Duane Benson	Linebacker	Hamline
281	Philadelphia Eagles	Omar Parker	Guard	Washington
282	Cleveland Browns	Bill Sabatino	Defensive end	Colorado
283	Boston Patriots	Leroy Mitchell	Wide receiver	Texas Southern
284	Buffalo Bills	Paul Tomich	Tackle	Drake
285	Dallas Cowboys	Pat Riley	Wide receiver	Kentucky (never played college football, was a basketball player)
286	Kansas City Chiefs	Bill Braswell	Guard	Auburn
287	Green Bay Packers	Dave Bennett	Quarterback	Springfield
288	New Orleans Saints	Bernard Corbin	Defensive back	Alabama A&M
290	Baltimore Colts	Herman Reed	Tackle	St. Augustine

=== Round 12 ===
Pick #	NFL team	Player	Position	College
289	New Orleans Saints	Ronnie Pack	Guard	Texas Tech
291	New York Giants	Bob Shortal	Linebacker	Dayton
292	Buffalo Bills	Ernie Ames	Defensive tackle	Kent State
293	Atlanta Falcons	Bill Gentry	Linebacker	North Carolina St
294	Miami Dolphins	Stan Juk	Linebacker	South Carolina
295	Miami Dolphins	Jim Whitaker	Defensive back	Missouri
296	Minnesota Vikings	Fred Cremer	Guard	St. John's (MN)
297	Detroit Lions	Eric Watts	Defensive back	San Jose State
298	Baltimore Colts	Preston Pearson	Defensive back	Illinois (never played college football, was a basketball player)
299	Chicago Bears	Bruce Green	Wide receiver	Midland (Neb.)
300	Washington Redskins	Ron Sepic	Wide receiver	Ohio State
301	San Francisco 49ers	James Hall	Linebacker	Tuskegee
302	New York Jets	Randy Rasmussen	Guard	Kearney (Neb.)
303	Kansas City Chiefs	Dick Kolowski	Center	Lake Forest
304	Los Angeles Rams	Pat Badjek	Linebacker	Franklin (Ind.)
305	St. Louis Cardinals	Steve Dundas	Wide receiver	Pomona
306	Oakland Raiders	Bob Kruse	Guard	Wayne State
307	Baltimore Colts	J.B. Christian	Guard	Oklahoma State
308	Cleveland Browns	Charles Fowler	Tackle	Houston
309	Philadelphia Eagles	Ben Monroe	Quarterback	New Mexico
310	Boston Patriots	Dave Davis	Tackle	Harvard
311	Buffalo Bills	Bob Bonner	Defensive tackle	Southern
312	Dallas Cowboys	Harold Deters	Kicker	North Carolina State
313	Kansas City Chiefs	Kent Lashley	Wide receiver	N.E. Oklahoma State
314	Green Bay Packers	Mike Bass	Defensive back	Michigan
315	New Orleans Saints	John Robinson	Wide receiver	Tennessee State

=== Round 13 ===
Pick #	NFL team	Player	Position	College
316	New Orleans Saints	Bill Stetz	Linebacker	Boston College
317	Atlanta Falcons	Sandor Szabo	Kicker	Ithaca
318	Buffalo Bills	Howard Finley	Defensive back	Tennessee State
319	Buffalo Bills	George Carter	Running back	St. Bonaventure
320	New York Giants	Tom Stidham	Kicker	Oklahoma
321	Denver Broncos	Dennis Furjanic	Defensive back	Houston
322	Detroit Lions	Lamar Wright	Guard	Georgia Tech
323	Minnesota Vikings	Charles Hardt	Defensive back	Tulsa
324	Pittsburgh Steelers	Jim Homan	Guard	USC
325	San Francisco 49ers	Rich Gibbs	Defensive back	Iowa
326	Chicago Bears	Kaye Carstens	Defensive back	Nebraska
327	New York Jets	Jack Emmer	Wide receiver	Rutgers
328	Washington Redskins	Robert Rodwell	Linebacker	Eastern Michigan
329	San Diego Chargers	Leon Carr	Defensive back	Prairie View
330	Los Angeles Rams	John Erisman	Wide receiver	Miami (OH)
331	St. Louis Cardinals	Bob Duncum	Tackle	W. Texas State
332	Oakland Raiders	Len Kleinpeter	Wide receiver	Southwestern Louisiana
333	Cleveland Browns	Billy Andrews	Linebacker	Southeastern Louisiana
334	Philadelphia Eagles	Bill Downes	Defensive tackle	Louisville
335	Baltimore Colts	Marc Allen	Defensive end	W. Texas State
336	Boston Patriots	Ray Ilg	Linebacker	Colgate
337	Buffalo Bills	Randy Wheeler	Running back	Georgia
338	Dallas Cowboys	Al Kerkian	Defensive end	Akron
339	Kansas City Chiefs	Linwood Simmons	Running back	Edward Waters
340	Green Bay Packers	Keith Brown	Wide receiver	Central Missouri
341	New Orleans Saints	Gary Grossnickle	Defensive back	Missouri

=== Round 14 ===
Pick #	NFL team	Player	Position	College
342	New Orleans Saints	Jim Hester	Tight end	North Dakota
343	New York Giants	Bill Bates	Kicker	Missouri
344	Miami Dolphins	Charles Stikes	Defensive back	Kent State
345	Houston Oilers	Henry Hailstock	Guard	Lincoln
346	Atlanta Falcons	Tom Bryan	Running back	Auburn
347	Denver Broncos	Tom Francisco	Running back	Virginia Tech
348	Minnesota Vikings	James Hargrove	Linebacker	Howard Payne
349	Detroit Lions	Cleveland Robinson	Defensive end	South Carolina State
350	Pittsburgh Steelers	Chet Anderson	Tight end	Minnesota
351	Chicago Bears	Lynn Nesbitt	Guard	Wake Forest
352	New York Jets	Mike Stromberg	Linebacker	Temple
353	Washington Redskins	Andy Socha	Running back	Marshall
354	San Francisco 49ers	Dalton Leblanc	Wide receiver	N.E. Louisiana
355	San Diego Chargers	Martin Baccaglio	Defensive tackle	San Jose State
356	Los Angeles Rams	Walt Richardson	Defensive tackle	Fresno State
357	St. Louis Cardinals	Bo Hickey	Running back	Maryland
358	Philadelphia Eagles	Dick Kenney	Kicker	Michigan State
359	Baltimore Colts	Pat Conley	Linebacker	Purdue
360	Cleveland Browns	Floyd Rogers	Tackle	Clemson
361	Boston Patriots	Bobby Beaird	Defensive back	Auburn
362	Buffalo Bills	Vern Moore	Running back	Central State (OK)
363	Oakland Raiders	Casey Boyett	Wide receiver	Brigham Young
364	Dallas Cowboys	Tommy Boyd	Guard	Tarleton State
365	Kansas City Chiefs	John Bishop	Defensive tackle	Delta State
366	Green Bay Packers	Claudis James	Running back	Jackson State
367	New Orleans Saints	George Stetter	Defensive back	Virginia

=== Round 15 ===
Pick #	NFL team	Player	Position	College
368	New Orleans Saints	John Snow	Tackle	Wake Forest
369	New York Giants	Tom Reale	Tackle	Southern Connecticut
370	Houston Oilers	Marvin McQueen	Linebacker	Mississippi
371	Atlanta Falcons	Al Nicholas	Running back	Sacramento State
372	Miami Dolphins	Jake Ferro	Linebacker	Youngstown State
373	Denver Broncos	Don Smith	Guard	Florida A&M
374	Detroit Lions	Sam Burke	Defensive back	Georgia Tech
375	Minnesota Vikings	Jimmy Shea	Defensive back	Eastern New Mexico
376	Pittsburgh Steelers	Mike Love	Running back	Abilene Christian
377	Chicago Bears	Terry Oakes	Defensive end	San Francisco State
378	Washington Redskins	Ed Breding	Guard	Texas A&M
379	San Francisco 49ers	Clarence Spencer	Wide receiver	Louisville
380	New York Jets	Jack Schweberger	Wide receiver	Vermont
381	San Diego Chargers	Craig Scoggins	Wide receiver	San Diego State
382	Los Angeles Rams	Steve Bunker	Tight end	Oregon
383	St. Louis Cardinals	Bill Wosilius	Linebacker	Syracuse
384	Oakland Raiders	Ben Woodson	Running back	Utah
385	Baltimore Colts	Bob Wade	Defensive back	Morgan State
386	Cleveland Browns	Dennis Williamson	Defensive back	Whitewater
387	Philadelphia Eagles	David Poche	Tackle	McNeese
388	Boston Patriots	Tom Folliard	Linebacker	Mississippi State
389	Buffalo Bills	Grant Martinsen	Defensive back	Utah State
390	Dallas Cowboys	Leavie David	Defensive back	Edward Waters
391	Kansas City Chiefs	Dennis Caponi	Running back	Xavier
392	Green Bay Packers	Jim Schneider	Defensive tackle	Colgate
393	New Orleans Saints	Darrell Johnson	Running back	Lamar Tech

=== Round 16 ===
Pick #	NFL team	Player	Position	College
394	New Orleans Saints	Marcus Rhoden	Wide receiver	Mississippi State
395	New York Giants	Bill Seman	Guard	N.E. Missouri
396	Atlanta Falcons	Larry Chester	Defensive back	Allen
397	Miami Dolphins	Maurice Calhoun	Running back	Central (Ohio)
398	Houston Oilers	Rex Keeling	Wide receiver	Samford (Ala)
399	Denver Broncos	Jack Lentz	Quarterback	Holy Cross
400	Minnesota Vikings	Gene Beard	Defensive back	Virginia Union
401	Detroit Lions	Jerry Zawadzkas	Tight end	Columbia
402	Pittsburgh Steelers	Bill Smith	Center	Oregon
403	Chicago Bears	Bill Rogers	Defensive back	Weber State
404	San Francisco 49ers	Bart Templeman	Center	Eastern Montana
405	New York Jets	Doug Archibald	Defensive back	Tennessee
406	Washington Redskins	Alfredo Avila	Defensive back	Sul Ross
407	San Diego Chargers	Mark Waitte	Tackle	South Carolina
408	Los Angeles Rams	Allen Sack	Linebacker	Notre Dame
409	Oakland Raiders	Don Bruce	Guard	Virginia Tech
410	St. Louis Cardinals	Phil Spiller	Defensive back	Los Angeles State
411	Cleveland Browns	Don Williams	Wide receiver	Akron
412	Philadelphia Eagles	Lynn Baker	Defensive back	Colorado
413	Baltimore Colts	Don Alley	Wide receiver	Adams State
414	Boston Patriots	Keith Freeman	Running back	Southern Connecticut
415	Buffalo Bills	Mike Irwin	Running back	Penn State
416	Dallas Cowboys	Paul Brothers	Quarterback	Oregon State
417	Kansas City Chiefs	Charles Noggle	Running back	North Carolina State
418	Green Bay Packers	Fred Cassidy	Running back	Miami (FL)
419	New Orleans Saints	Bruce Cortez	Defensive back	Parsons

=== Round 17 ===
Pick #	NFL team	Player	Position	College
420	New Orleans Saints	Danny Abramowicz	Flanker	Xavier
421	New York Giants	Micheal Brennan	Running back	Rutgers
422	Miami Dolphins	Mario Cordoves	Tackle	Miami (FL)
423	Houston Oilers	Larry Lee	Wide receiver	Texas A&M
424	Atlanta Falcons	Bill Buckner	Quarterback	Delta State
425	Denver Broncos	Patrick Yale	Tackle	Colorado State
426	Detroit Lions	Ken Ramsey	Defensive tackle	Northwestern
427	Minnesota Vikings	Todd Vandal	Defensive back	North Dakota State
428	Pittsburgh Steelers	Mike Davenport	Running back	Wyoming
429	Chicago Bears	Jack Myers	Linebacker	Western Colorado
430	New York Jets	Bob Biletnikoff	Quarterback	University of Miami
431	Washington Redskins	Lyle Baucom	Tackle	San Francisco State
432	San Francisco 49ers	Danny Talbott	Quarterback	North Carolina
433	San Diego Chargers	John Gibbs	Running back	South Carolina State
434	Los Angeles Rams	Bill Barnes	Center	Washington
435	St. Louis Cardinals	Terry Bacigalupo	Defensive end	Oklahoma State
436	Oakland Raiders	Mike Cullin	Defensive end	Slippery Rock
437	Philadelphia Eagles	George Catavolos	Defensive back	Purdue
438	New Orleans Saints	Billy Bob Stewart	Linebacker	Southern Methodist
439	Cleveland Browns	Ben Davis	Defensive back	Defiance
440	Boston Patriots	Bobby Nichols	Tight end	Boston University
441	Buffalo Bills	Grover Smith	Running back	Fort Valley State
442	Dallas Cowboys	George Adams	Linebacker	Morehead State
443	Kansas City Chiefs	Dave Lattin	Wide receiver	Texas Western
444	Green Bay Packers	Jeff Elias	Tight end	Kansas
445	New Orleans Saints	Jimmy Walker	Wide receiver	Providence

= Pro Bowler	= AFL All-Star	= Hall of Famer

== Hall of Famers ==
- Ken Houston, defensive back from Prairie View A&M, taken 9th round 214th overall by AFL's Houston Oilers

Inducted: Professional Football Hall of Fame class of 1986.

- Willie Lanier, middle linebacker from Morgan State, taken 2nd round 50th overall by AFL's Kansas City Chiefs

Inducted: Professional Football Hall of Fame class of 1986.

- Gene Upshaw, offensive guard from Texas A&I, taken 1st round 17th overall by AFL's Oakland Raiders

Inducted: Professional Football Hall of Fame class of 1987.

- Alan Page, defensive end from Notre Dame, taken 1st round 15th overall by Minnesota Vikings, who converted him to defensive tackle

Inducted: Professional Football Hall of Fame class of 1988.

- Bob Griese, quarterback from Purdue, taken 1st round 4th overall by AFL's Miami Dolphins

Inducted: Professional Football Hall of Fame class of 1990.

- Jan Stenerud, placekicker from Montana State, undrafted and signed by AFL's Kansas City Chiefs

Inducted: Professional Football Hall of Fame class of 1991.

- Lem Barney, defensive back from Jackson State, taken 2nd round 34th overall by Detroit Lions

Inducted: Professional Football Hall of Fame class of 1992.

- Larry Little, offensive tackle from Bethune-Cookman, undrafted and signed by AFL's San Diego Chargers

Inducted: Professional Football Hall of Fame class of 1993.

- Rayfield Wright, offensive tackle from Fort Valley State, taken 7th round 182nd overall by Dallas Cowboys

Inducted: Professional Football Hall of Fame class of 2006.

- Floyd Little, running back from Syracuse University, taken 1st round 6th overall by Denver Broncos

Inducted: Professional Football Hall of Fame class of 2010.

== Notable undrafted players ==
^{†}	= Pro Bowler	‡	= Hall of Famer

Original NFL team	Player	Pos.	College	Notes
Baltimore Colts	Ross Gwinn	G	Northwestern State	
Baltimore Colts	Phil Sobocinski	C	Wisconsin	
Dallas Cowboys	Coy Bacon ^{†}	DT	Jackson State	
Dallas Cowboys	Ron East	DT	Montana State	
Dallas Cowboys	Mac Percival	K	Texas Tech	
Denver Broncos	Errol Mann	K	North Dakota	
Denver Broncos	Chip Myrtle	LB	Maryland	
Houston Oilers	Alvin Reed ^{†}	TE	Prairie View A&M	
Kansas City Chiefs	Jan Stenerud^{‡}	K	Montana State	
Los Angeles Rams	Jeff Jordan	RB	Washington	
New Orleans Saints	Tom McNeill	P	Stephen F. Austin	
New Orleans Saints	Elijah Nevett	CB	Clark Atlanta	
New York Giants	Andy Gross	G	Auburn	
New York Jets	Randy Beverly	CB	Colorado State	
New York Jets	John Matlock	C	Miami	
Pittsburgh Steelers	Sam Davis	G	Allen	
St. Louis Cardinals	Cid Edwards	RB	Tennessee State	
San Diego Chargers	Larry Little^{‡}	T	Bethune-Cookman	
San Diego Chargers	Jeff Staggs	LB	San Diego State	
San Diego Chargers	Kay Stephenson	QB	Florida	
San Francisco 49ers	Dave Olerich	LB	San Francisco	

== See also ==
- 1967 NFL expansion draft
