= Jerry Griffin =

Canadian football player (1944–2021)

Profile
- Position: Linebacker

Personal information
- Born: December 10, 1944; Dallas, Texas, U.S.
- Died: March 29, 2021 (aged 76)
- Listed height: 6 ft 1 in (1.85 m)
- Listed weight: 225 lb (102 kg)

Career information
- High school: Dallas (TX) Woodrow Wilson
- College: Southern Methodist
- NFL draft: 1967: 8th round, 200th overall pick

Career history
- 1967–1973: Edmonton Eskimos
- 1973: Saskatchewan Roughriders

Awards and highlights
- First-team All-SWC (1966)

Jerry Lynn Griffin (December 10, 1944 – March 29, 2021) was an American professional Canadian football player who played for the Edmonton Eskimos and Saskatchewan Roughriders.
