= Doug Kriewald =

American football player (born 1945)

No. 60
- Position: Guard

Personal information
- Born: August 30, 1945 (age 81); Seguin, Texas, U.S.
- Listed height: 6 ft 4 in (1.93 m)
- Listed weight: 245 lb (111 kg)

Career information
- High school: William B. Travis (Austin, Texas)
- College: West Texas A&M
- NFL draft: 1967: 6th round, 143rd overall pick

Career history
- Chicago Bears (1967–1968)

Career NFL statistics
- Games played: 15
- Games started: 1
- Stats at Pro Football Reference

Doug Kriewald (born August 30, 1945) is an American former professional football player who was a guard for the Chicago Bears of the National Football League (NFL) from 1967 to 1968. He played college football for the West Texas A&M Buffaloes.
