= Bobby Leo =

American football player (born 1945)

No. 24
- Positions: Running back, Wide receiver

Personal information
- Born: January 19, 1945 (age 81); Everett, Massachusetts, U.S.
- Listed height: 5 ft 10 in (1.78 m)
- Listed weight: 180 lb (82 kg)

Career information
- High school: Everett
- College: Harvard (1963-1966)
- NFL draft: 1967: 7th round, 180th overall pick

Career history
- Boston Patriots (1967-1968)

Awards and highlights
- First-team All-East (1966)

Career AFL statistics
- Rushing yards: 7
- Rushing average: 7
- Receptions: 1
- Receiving yards: 25
- Return yards: 298
- Total touchdowns: 1
- Stats at Pro Football Reference

Bobby Leo (born January 19, 1945) is an American former professional football player who was a wide receiver, tailback, kick returner, and punt returner for parts of two seasons for the Boston Patriots of the American Football League (AFL). He was a prominent football figure at Harvard and Everett High School, both in Massachusetts.

== Career ==
Leo attended Harvard College where he played football, baseball and ran track. Leo is the only Massachusetts High School football athlete to earn All-Scholastic honors for three years. He did so despite missing half his senior year to a separated shoulder early in the season against Arlington High School. The Boston Globe named him the third best high school football player in Massachusetts history in 1999, and again in 2015.

A Sports Illustrated college football feature in its 10/31/1966 issue praised Leo and included a photo and quotations from an interview with him after an important Harvard victory against Dartmouth. Leo earned All-Ivy honors, was named the top back in New England and was an honorable mention All-American. He is a member of the Harvard Hall of Fame. In his final year at Harvard, he broke the school record for yards per carry, at 6.4, finishing 7th in the NCAA that year. His Harvard rushing record stood for the rest of the 20th century.

Leo was selected in the seventh round by the Boston Patriots in the first combined NFL/AFL draft in 1967. He remains the earliest Harvard player drafted by the Patriots, taken as the Patriots' 5th draft pick in the seventh round, and is still the only Harvard player to score a touchdown for the Patriots. After serving a stint in the military after graduation from college, Leo joined the team toward the end of the season in 1967.

His first game was a memorable one. On national television against the Buffalo Bills, Leo was the primary kick and punt returner for the Patriots. He electrified the crowd at Fenway Park with one of the top 10 longest punt returns in the American Football League that season, a 42-yard sprint past the entire Bills coverage team, before slipping on the mud in Fenway's baseball infield dirt, inside the ten yard line, while evading the Bills punter. He recorded a 25-yard touchdown reception in the final moments of the game. He also had a 7 yard run on an end-around.

The following season, during the Patriots training camp at Phillips Academy in Andover, Massachusetts, Leo impressed the coaching staff with his speed as compared to the Patriots latest draft picks. The training camp issue of Pats Patter (the Patriots official newsletter) featured a photo of Leo showing his heroics for the Patriots at Fenway Park in that late season game with the caption "Leo exhibits his breakaway potential against the Buffalo Bills," along with a brief piece describing his amazing speed. He started camp that year back at his college position as a tailback. Indeed, he was listed as second of five players on the depth chart in the team's official 1968 Patriots Media Guide at the halfback position.

During the long preseason (which included games against both AFL and NFL teams), the coaching staff decided to move him to receiver again, with great success. He had a productive game at that position against the Saints in a game played at Tulane University. Against the Jets in a game in Richmond, Virginia, he led the team both in pass receptions and receiving yards, and was moved to the starting lineup the following week against the Dolphins. He concluded his success at flanker by scoring in an AFL v. NFL game against the Philadelphia Eagles at his old stomping grounds, Harvard Stadium, and serving as the team's primary kick and punt returner. The promotional materials for that game featured Leo prominently with a photo and article noting how well he played in when he joined the club the prior year and predicting that we would see "quite a bit of action" at both flanker back and halfback in the 1968 season. However, various injuries held him back as other veteran receivers pushed for more playing time, but he maintained his starting spot on the punt and kick return squads as the regular season began. After returning punts and kickoffs in the first game of the regular season in Buffalo, the following week Leo suffered a serious injury in a practice scrimmage inflicted by a teammate and was hospitalized for four days. As a result of a bye week for the Patriots in week two of the regular season, the team had a week layoff before their next game, and was required to make roster moves because their primary punter was hurt as well. The coaching staff asked Leo to accept a temporary assignment to the taxi squad as he recovered from his injury. Leo refused, and retired from the game.

== After football ==
After the 1968 season, Leo decided to return to academics, attending law school in the Boston area and practicing law for many years thereafter.
