= Bob Jones (wide receiver) =

American football player (born 1945)

No. 43
- Position: Wide receiver

Personal information
- Born: August 25, 1945 (age 81); Warren, Ohio, U.S.
- Listed height: 6 ft 4 in (1.93 m)
- Listed weight: 196 lb (89 kg)

Career information
- High school: Claremont (Claremont, California)
- College: San Diego State (1965-1966)
- NFL draft: 1967: 2nd round, 36th overall pick

Career history
- Chicago Bears (1967–1968); Atlanta Falcons (1969)

Career NFL statistics
- Receptions: 3
- Receiving yards: 80
- Touchdowns: 1
- Stats at Pro Football Reference

Robert Dean Jones (born August 25, 1945) is an American former professional football player who was a wide receiver in the National Football League (NFL). He played for the Chicago Bears from 1967 to 1968 and for the Atlanta Falcons in 1969. He played college football for the San Diego State Aztecs.

After his football career, Jones attended law school and became a licensed attorney in the State of California. He later served as a Deputy District Attorney for Orange County, California, where he prosecuted criminal cases.
