= SEC Football Legends =

SEC Football Legends is an annual award program of the Southeastern Conference designed to honor outstanding former college football players from each of the conference's fourteen member institutions. Begun in 1994, the Legends Dinner featuring video highlights of each honoree's career is one of various events of the week leading up to the SEC Championship Game. The honorees are also recognized at halftime of the game.

== SEC Legends honorees ==
=== Eastern Division ===
Year	Florida	Georgia	Kentucky	Missouri	South Carolina	Tennessee	Vanderbilt
1994	Neal Anderson	Charley Trippi	Babe Parilli	–	George Rogers	Bob Johnson	Bill Wade
1995	Jack Youngblood	Fran Tarkenton	Derrick Ramsey	–	Alex Hawkins	Doug Atkins	Bob Asher
1996	Nat Moore	Bill Stanfill	Wallace Jones	–	Sterling Sharpe	Condredge Holloway	John Hall
1997	Carlos Alvarez	Terry Hoage	Jerry Claiborne	–	Todd Ellis	John Michels	Bucky Curtis
1998	Glenn Cameron	John Rauch	Bob Gain	–	Bobby Bryant	Richmond Flowers	Charley Horton
1999	Kerwin Bell	Herschel Walker	Steve Meilinger	–	Rick Sanford	Steve Kiner	Bob Werckle
2000	John Reaves	Kevin Butler	Lou Michaels	–	Harold Green	Steve DeLong	Herb Rich
2001	Huey Richardson	Tommy Lyons	Sam Ball	–	Robert Brooks	Stanley Morgan	Will Wolford
2002	Brad Culpepper	George Patton	Art Still	–	Jeff Grantz	Johnny Majors	Jim Arnold
2003	Larry Smith	Scott Woerner	Dermontti Dawson	–	Dickie Harris	Reggie White	Whit Taylor
2004	Lomas Brown	Mike Wilson	George Blanda	–	Dan Reeves	Frank Emanuel	Gerard Mitchell
2005	Trace Armstrong	Zeke Bratkowski	Warren Bryant	–	Warren Muir	Larry Seivers	Chris Gaines
2006	Louis Oliver	Garrison Hearst	Jeff Van Note	–	Willie Scott	Chip Kell	Eric Jones
2007	Ralph Ortega	Rex Robinson	Larry Seiple	–	Duce Staley	Willie Gault	Chuck Scott
2008	Errict Rhett	Eric Zeier	Irv Goode	–	Brad Edwards	Doug Dickey	Shelton Quarles
2009	Reidel Anthony	Matt Stinchcomb	Jim Kovach	–	Tommy Suggs	Heath Shuler	Jamie Duncan
2010	Kevin Carter	Ben Zambiasi	Tim Couch	–	Andrew Provence	Al Wilson	Corey Chavous
2011	Ike Hilliard	Boss Bailey	Rodger Bird	–	Brandon Bennett	Bobby Majors	Corey Harris
2012	Steve Tannen	David Greene	Sonny Collins	Johnny Roland	Ko Simpson	Peerless Price	Hunter Hillenmeyer
2013	Wes Chandler	Tim Worley	Wilbur Hackett	Phil Bradley	Max Runager	Inky Johnson	Jimmy Williams
2014	Lito Sheppard	John Little	Derek Abney	Kellen Winslow	Sheldon Brown	Todd Kelly	Jonathan Goff
2015	Fred Taylor	Richard Seymour	Dave Roller	Roger Wehrli	André Goodman	Chuck Smith	Earl Bennett
2016	Steve Spurrier	Jon Stinchcomb	James Whalen	Justin Smith	Travelle Wharton	Deon Grant	Chris Williams
2017	Danny Wuerffel	Champ Bailey	Nate Northington	Brad Smith	John Abraham	Chad Clifton	Don Orr
2018	Lawrence Wright	Hines Ward	Rich Brooks	Devin West	Eric Norwood	Phillip Fulmer	Zac Stacy
2019	Jevon Kearse	Vince Dooley	Oliver Barnett	Jeremy Maclin	Fred Zeigler	Darwin Walker	Jovan Haye
2022	Alex Brown	Thomas Davis	Joe Federspiel	Gary Pinkel	Alshon Jeffery	Peyton Manning	Allama Matthews
2023	Shane Matthews	Knowshon Moreno	Wesley Woodyard	Chase Coffman	Marcus Lattimore	Joey Kent	Jamie Winborn
2024	Rex Grossman	Terrence Edwards	Dicky Lyons Sr.	Chase Daniel	Corey Miller	Eric Berry	Ricky Anderson

=== Western Division ===
Year	Alabama	Arkansas	Auburn	LSU	Ole Miss	Mississippi St.	Texas A&M
1994	Lee Roy Jordan	Lance Alworth	Tracy Rocker	Jim Taylor	Charlie Conerly	Johnny Baker	–
1995	Harry Gilmer	Joe Ferguson	Tucker Frederickson	Dalton Hilliard	Barney Poole	Jimmy Webb	–
1996	Billy Neighbors	Chuck Dicus	Joe Cribbs	Billy Cannon	Johnny Vaught	Hunter Corhern	–
1997	John Hannah	Jim Benton	Zeke Smith	Charles Alexander	John "Kayo" Dottley	Steve Freeman	–
1998	Holt Rast	Clyde Scott	Pat Sullivan	Bert Jones	Archie Manning	Johnie Cooks	–
1999	Johnny Musso	Bill Montgomery	Jackie Burkett	Jerry Stovall	Charlie Flowers	D. D. Lewis	–
2000	Dwight Stephenson	Ronnie Caveness	Stacy Danley	Roy Winston	Robert Khayat	Kent Hull	–
2001	Joe Namath	Steve Atwater	Mike Kolen	Tommy Hodson	Ray Poole	Rockey Felker	–
2002	Vaughn Mancha	Loyd Phillips	Terry Beasley	Mike Anderson	Ben Williams	Harper Davis	–
2003	Jeremiah Castille	Wayne Harris	Steve Wallace	Wendell Davis	Billy Ray Adams	Tyrone Keys	–
2004	Bob Baumhower	Fred Marshall	Jim Phillips	Paul Dietzel	Allen Brown	Art Davis	–
2005	Cornelius Bennett	Quinn Grovey	Ed Dyas	Eric Martin	Andre Townsend	Joe Fortunato	–
2006	Steve Sloan	Cliff Powell	Bo Jackson	Y. A. Tittle	Jake Gibbs	Wayne Harris	–
2007	Ken Stabler	Ken Hatfield	Ken Rice	Tommy Casanova	Wesley Walls	Billy Jackson	–
2008	Bart Starr	Billy Ray Smith, Jr.	Al Del Greco	Lance Smith	Bobby Ray Franklin	Tom Goode	–
2009	Antonio Langham	Gary Anderson	Quentin Riggins	Michael Brooks	Jimmy Lear	Billy Stacy	–
2010	Cornelius Griffin	Frank Broyles	Gregg Carr	Fred Miller	Everett Lindsay	Eric Moulds	–
2011	Dennis Homan	Leotis Harris	Buddy McClinton	George Bevan	Deuce McAllister	Tom Neville	–
2012	Paul Crane	Pat Summerall	James Owens	Kevin Mawae	Glynn Griffing	Walt Harris	John David Crow
2013	Marty Lyons	Wayne Martin	Frank Sanders	Kevin Faulk	Jeff Herrod	Glen Collins	Dat Nguyen
2014	Bobby Humphrey	Jerry Lamb	Cadillac Williams	Doug Moreau	Stan Hindman	Fred Smoot	Jacob Green
2015	Woodrow Lowe	Madre Hill	Takeo Spikes	Alan Faneca	Ken Lucas	Mario Haggan	Bubba Bean
2016	Chris Samuels	Shawn Andrews	Jason Campbell	Robert Dugas	Kris Mangum	Randy Thomas	Ray Mickens
2017	Gene Stallings	Dan Hampton	Carlos Rogers	Glenn Dorsey	Terrence Metcalf	Floyd Womack	Dave Elmendorf
2018	Shaun Alexander	Darren McFadden	Ronnie Brown	Ron Estay	Jim Miller	Mardye McDole	Pat Thomas
2019	Ray Perkins	Dennis Winston	Karlos Dansby	Johnny Robinson	Jonathan Nichols	Barrin Simpson	Ed Simonini
2022	Ozzie Newsome	Steve Korte	Ben Tamburello	Todd McClure	Eli Manning	K.J. Wright	Johnny Manziel
2023	Andre Smith	Dick Bumpas	Ed King	James Britt	Patrick Willis	Reggie Kelly	Ray Childress
2024	Barrett Jones	Ken Hamlin	Marcus McNeill	Andrew Whitworth	Dexter McCluster	Fletcher Cox	Luke Joeckel
