= Jackie Walker (American football, born 1950) =

American gridiron football player (1950–2002)

No. 52
- Position: Linebacker

Personal information
- Born: April 14, 1950; Knoxville, Tennessee, U.S.
- Died: December 5, 2002 (aged 52); Atlanta, Georgia, U.S.
- Listed height: 6 ft 0 in (1.83 m)
- Listed weight: 200 lb (91 kg)

Career information
- High school: Knoxville (TN) Fulton
- College: Tennessee
- NFL draft: 1972: 6th round, 148th overall pick

Career history
- San Francisco 49ers (1972)*
- * Offseason or practice squad member only

Awards and highlights
- 2× First-team All-American (1970, 1971); 2× First-team All-SEC (1970, 1971)

Jackie Eugene Walker (April 14, 1950 – December 5, 2002) was an American football linebacker who played for the University of Tennessee from 1969 to 1971. A two-time All-American, he was the first black captain of a Southeastern Conference squad. Walker shares the NCAA record for most interceptions returned for a touchdown, with five. He was drafted by the San Francisco 49ers in the sixth round of the 1972 NFL draft, but was cut before the season.

In the years following his death, Walker's supporters campaigned to have him inducted into local and national halls of fame, arguing he has been denied such recognition because he was gay.

== Early life ==
Walker was born in Knoxville, Tennessee, one of five children of Norman and Violet (Wilson) Walker. He grew up in what is now the Parkridge neighborhood of East Knoxville. His older brother, Marshall, was among the first African-American students to attend a desegregated Fulton High School, where he was a standout in football, and was awarded a scholarship to Florida A&M.

Jackie followed in his brother's footsteps, joining the Fulton squad in 1965. His head coach, Lon Herzbrun, had played for Tennessee in the mid-1950s, and had built Fulton into a regional powerhouse. During his senior year in 1967, Walker averaged over 20 tackles per game, and was named All-State, helping lead Fulton to an undefeated season. In a game against Oak Ridge, he delivered a legendary tackle, known simply as "The Hit," that knocked an opposing player unconscious.

== College career ==
Walker had planned to follow his brother to Florida A&M, but was offered a scholarship to Tennessee. He and Andy Bennett became only the school's second and third black football players (the first, Lester McClain, had joined the team in 1967). Walker played briefly for the freshman team in 1968 (freshmen were ineligible to play for the varsity squad prior to the 1970s) before suffering an injury.

Prior to his sophomore season in 1969, Tennessee head coach Doug Dickey hired Walker's high school coach, Lon Herzbrun, to coach linebackers. After naming Walker a starter, Herzbrun, realizing the gamble he was taking, told skeptics that if the move failed, "you can have my job." Starting alongside hard-hitting seniors Steve Kiner and Jack "Hacksaw" Reynolds, Walker made an immediate impact. In Tennessee's 41–14 rout of rival Alabama later that year, Walker intercepted a pitch-out and returned it 27 yards for a touchdown. In Tennessee's 31–26 win over Kentucky, Walker intercepted a pass from Kentucky quarterback Steven Tingle and returned it 54 yards for a touchdown. He was named a Sophomore All-American by The Football News at the end of the season.

During the 1970 season, Tennessee head coach Bill Battle (who had taken over after Dickey resigned to coach at Florida) entrusted Walker with signal-calling duties, which required reading the opposing offensive formation, and calling the play for the defense. In Tennessee's 24–0 win over Alabama, Walker intercepted two passes, returning one for a touchdown, and registered two tackles-for-loss in helping his team inflict a rare shutout on a Bear Bryant-coached team. A week later, Walker returned another interception for a touchdown in Tennessee's 38–7 win over Florida. In Tennessee's narrow 20–18 win over South Carolina in November, Walker registered 10 tackles, including one in which he stopped a Gamecock running back short of the goal line, intercepted two passes, and recovered a fumble. He finished the season with a team-leading 132 tackles (84 solo), including nine tackles-for-loss and two sacks, to go along with five interceptions. Walker was named an All-American by The Football News and the National Editorial Association.

Prior to his senior year in 1971, Walker's teammates elected him team captain, making him the first black player to achieve this distinction in the Southeastern Conference (one of the players he outpolled was future head coach Phillip Fulmer, who was at the time a senior offensive lineman). In Tennessee's 10–9 loss to Auburn in the second game of the season, Walker blocked a field goal attempt, blocked it again after Tennessee was called offside, and nearly blocked the go-ahead PAT in the fourth quarter. He was named "Southeast Defensive Player of the Week" by UPI. In Tennessee's 20–13 win over Florida the following week, Walker intercepted a pass, and forced a missed field goal and a missed extra point.

In Tennessee's game against Alabama in October 1971, Coach Bear Bryant was so concerned with Walker that he tasked three offensive linemen, among them John Hannah, one of the best linemen to ever play the game, with neutralizing the Tennessee linebacker. Walker's teammate Jamie Rotella later recalled that the scheme was effective, though Walker fought vehemently through every block. "We didn't really care about concussions then," Rotella said, "but he probably had one and continued playing." Walker finished the game with 17 tackles, but Tennessee was unable to overcome eight turnovers by its own offense, and fell 32–15. Alabama continued using the blocking scheme, which became known as "The Jackie Walker Play," against subsequent opponents.

In Tennessee's 10–7 win over Mississippi State the following week, Walker intercepted a pass from Bulldog quarterback Hal Chealander and returned it 43 yards for what would prove the game-winning touchdown. He returned his NCAA-record fifth career interception for a touchdown in Tennessee's regular season finale against Penn State, helping the Vols upset the previously unbeaten and heavily favored Nittany Lions, 31–11. He finished the season with 126 tackles (74 solo), including three tackles-for-loss, to go along with four interceptions, and was again named an All-American at the end of the season.

During his career, Walker intercepted 11 passes, five of which he returned for touchdowns. He had 281 total return yards (over 25 yards per interception). He registered 258 total tackles in 1970 and 1971 (tackles were not recorded in 1969), including twelve tackles-for-loss, forced six fumbles, and recovered four. Walker's five interceptions returned for touchdowns remains an NCAA record, though he now shares it with three other players, most recently Darrent Williams of Oklahoma State (2001–2004). Tennessee posted a record of 30–5 during Walker's three-year stint as a starting linebacker.

== NFL and later life ==
Walker was drafted by the San Francisco 49ers with the 148th overall pick in the sixth round of the 1972 NFL draft. At just 6'0", 200 pounds, he was considered too small to play linebacker in the NFL, and the 49ers had hoped to convert him to a strong safety. After struggling with the position change, he was cut just prior to the start of the season. Herzbrun, his former coach, suggested the 49ers weren't patient enough in waiting for Walker to transition to the new position. However, Walker later confided to his friend, artist Daw'U Smith, that he was cut because the 49ers organization found out he was gay. He afterward tried out for the Washington Redskins, but was unable to make the team.

While Walker never publicly "came out" as gay, he made little attempt to hide the fact after his senior season at Tennessee. By the end of the year, his family, teammates and coaches were aware of his sexual orientation. Herzbrun remembered that while driving to Walker's draft party in East Knoxville, a nervous Coach Battle stated he was going leave if Walker showed up in a dress.

Abandoning his attempts at an NFL career in 1974, Walker moved to Atlanta, where he worked for the city's parks and recreation department. After contracting HIV in 1998, he spent his final years traveling around the world. He died of complications from AIDS on December 5, 2002.

During Walker's final days, his brother Marshall had told him he was going to get him the recognition he deserved. His efforts went largely unnoticed, however, which Marshall suspected was due to Walker's sexual orientation. In 2007, Betty Bean, a reporter for Knoxville's alternative weekly, Metro Pulse, published an article on Walker's life. Walker's former coach Lon Herzbrun and several former teammates, among them Vol Network color analyst Tim Priest and Tennessee head coach Phillip Fulmer, were astonished to learn that Walker's career had mostly gone unnoticed, and began campaigning on his behalf. Walker was inducted into the Greater Knoxville Sports Hall of Fame in 2008, and the Tennessee Sports Hall of Fame in 2011. In 2014, Walker was one of 75 players on the ballot for induction into the College Football Hall of Fame, but was not among the 14 players selected.
