= Tim Priest (American football) =

American lawyer and gridiron football player (born 1949)

No. 26
- Position: Defensive back

Personal information
- Born: March 10, 1949 (age 77); Humboldt, Tennessee, U.S.
- Listed height: 5 ft 11 in (1.80 m)
- Listed weight: 195 lb (88 kg)

Career information
- High school: Huntingdon (TN)
- College: University of Tennessee

Career history
- 1968–1970: Tennessee

Awards and highlights
- Second-team All-American (1970); First-team All-SEC (1970); Second-team All-SEC (1969)

Timothy A. Priest (born March 10, 1949) is an American attorney, broadcaster and former football player. He served as the football color analyst for the University of Tennessee's Vol Radio Network from 1999 to 2021, working alongside play-by-play commentator Bob Kesling. Priest played for Tennessee from 1968 to 1970, and holds the school's career interceptions record, with 18. He was captain of the 1970 squad, which featured one of the most heralded defensive backfields in school history.

Priest has practiced law in the Knoxville area since the late 1970s. He served as municipal court judge for the town of Farragut, Tennessee, from 1998 to 2005.

== Early life ==
Priest was born in Humboldt, Tennessee, the son of Marshall and Eleanor (Harris) Priest. His mother was a graduate of the University of Tennessee and worked as a piano teacher. Priest attended Huntingdon High School in Huntingdon, Tennessee. He played quarterback at Huntingdon from 1964 to 1966, winning All-State honors his senior year.

== College ==
Priest joined Tennessee's football team, at the time coached by Doug Dickey, in 1967, though freshmen were ineligible to play varsity before the 1970s. During spring practice prior to his sophomore year in 1968, Priest beat out two veterans for a starting slot in the defensive backfield. In Tennessee's game against Vanderbilt in November of that year, Priest intercepted a pass at the Tennessee 27 yard line late in the fourth quarter to thwart a Commodore drive and secure a 10–7 victory. He was named to the Sophomore All-SEC team at the end of the season.

As a member of the stellar 1969 defensive unit that included Jack "Hacksaw" Reynolds, Steve Kiner, and Jackie Walker, Priest registered an SEC-leading seven interceptions. In Tennessee's 29–14 win over South Carolina, Priest intercepted a pass from quarterback Randy Yoakum in the fourth quarter to set up the Vols' final touchdown to help seal the win. In Tennessee's 45–19 win over Auburn, he intercepted a pass from Auburn quarterback Rick Eisenacher and returned it 38 yards for a touchdown.

Prior to the 1970 season, Priest was elected team captain. Tennessee's new head coach, Bill Battle, hired two talented assistants, Larry Jones and Buddy Bennett, who encouraged a more aggressive style of play. Tennessee's 1970 defense registered an SEC-record 36 team interceptions. Tennessee safety Bobby Majors and Priest were first and second in the NCAA in interceptions that year, with ten and nine, respectively. During the third quarter of the Vols' 17–6 win over Georgia Tech, Priest intercepted a pass from Eddie McAshan at the Tennessee one yard line to snuff out a long drive. In Tennessee's 24–0 win over Alabama, Priest intercepted a pass from Tide quarterback Neb Hayden to set up the Vols' first touchdown, and finished the game with a school record three interceptions (part of a school team record eight interceptions). In Tennessee's 45–0 rout of Kentucky, Priest intercepted a pass from Bernie Scruggs to again set up the Vols' first score. He finished the season with 57 tackles (33 solo), including two sacks, to go along with his nine interceptions, and was named All-SEC.

During his three years at Tennessee, Priest intercepted 18 passes, which remains a school record. His tally of nine interceptions in 1970 is tied for the school's second-highest single-season total (behind Majors' ten), and his three interceptions against Alabama in 1970 remains tied for the school's single-game record. Priest's career tally of 305 interception return yards remained tied with teammate Mike Jones for the school record until 2008, when it was broken by Eric Berry.

== Post-playing career ==
A three-time Academic All-SEC athlete, Priest was awarded an NCAA post-graduate scholarship following his senior year, and served as a graduate assistant for the Vols during the 1971 season. In 1972, Battle appointed Priest assistant coach of the freshman team, replacing Dewey Warren.

Priest graduated valedictorian, Order of the Coif, from the University of Tennessee College of Law in 1975, and was admitted to the Tennessee bar in 1976. He worked as an associate with the firm of Banks Campbell and Owen before becoming a full partner in 1978. He joined the firm of Pryor Priest and Harber in 1982. In 1998, he was appointed municipal court judge for the Town of Farragut, replacing the outgoing Judge David Creekmore. He held this position until 2005.

From 1975 to 1999, Priest cohosted a radio call-in show, "Football Finals," on the Knoxville-area radio station WIVK-FM. During the latter year, at the conclusion of Tennessee's national championship season, the long-time Vol Radio Network duo of play-by-play announcer John Ward and football color analyst Bill Anderson retired, and sports reporter Bob Kesling and Priest were hired as their respective successors. He announced his retirement from the Vol Network in June 2021, after 22 seasons.

Priest was named to the Greater Knoxville Sports Hall of Fame in 2008, and the Tennessee Sports Hall of Fame in 2009. On November 12, 2016, he was honored as a Vol Legend of the Game prior to Tennessee's game against Kentucky at Neyland Stadium.

== Personal ==
Priest married former Vol cheerleader Betsy Minnis in 1971. They have two children, Adam and Laura.
