= 1969 All-America college football team =

Official list of the best college football players of 1969

The 1969 All-America college football team is composed of college football players who were selected as All-Americans by various organizations that chose College Football All-America Teams in 1969.

The NCAA recognizes six selectors as "official" for the 1969 season. They are (1) the American Football Coaches Association (AFCA), (2) the Associated Press (AP), (3) the Central Press Association (CP), (4) the Football Writers Association of America (FWAA), (5) the Newspaper Enterprise Association (NEA), and (6) the United Press International (UPI). Four of the six teams (AP, UPI, NEA, and FWAA) were selected by polling of sports writers and/or broadcasters. The Central Press team was selected with input from the captains of the major college teams. The AFCA team was based on a poll of coaches. Other notable selectors, though not recognized by the NCAA as official, included Football News, a national weekly football publication, Time magazine, The Sporting News (TSN), and the Walter Camp Football Foundation (WC).

== Offensive selections ==
=== Ends ===
- Walker Gillette, Richmond (AP-1 [wide receiver], FWAA, NEA-1 [split end], TSN, Time)
- Carlos Alvarez, Florida (College Football Hall of Fame) (AFCA [flanker], AP-3 [wide receiver], CP-2, NEA-1 [split end], UPI-1, FN, WC)
- Ken Burrough, Texas Southern (NEA-2, Time, TSN)
- Cotton Speyrer, Texas (CP-1, UPI-2, WC)
- Chuck Dicus, Arkansas (College Football Hall of Fame) (AFCA)
- Elmo Wright, Houston (College Football Hall of Fame)(AP-2 [wide receiver], CP-3, NEA-2 [split end], UPI-2, FN)
- Ernie Jennings, Air Force (CP-2)
- Jade Butcher, Indiana (CP-3)

=== Tight ends ===
- Jim Mandich, Michigan (College Football Hall of Fame) (AFCA [end], AP-1, CP-1 [end], FWAA, NEA-1, UPI-1 [end], FN [end], Time, WC)
- Steve Zabel, Oklahoma (TSN)
- Jim McFarland, Nebraska (AP-2)
- Ray Parson, Minnesota (NEA-2)
- Bob Moore, Stanford (AP-3)

=== Tackles ===
- Bob McKay, Texas (College Football Hall of Fame) (AP-1, CP-2, FWAA, NEA-1, UPI-1, FN, Time, TSN, WC)
- John Ward, Oklahoma State (AFCA [guard], AP-1, FWAA, UPI-2)
- Sid Smith, USC (AP-2, CP-1, NEA-2, UPI-1, FN, Time, TSN, WC)
- Bob Asher, Vanderbilt (AP-2, CP-1, NEA-1, UPI-2)
- Bobby Wuensch, Texas (AFCA)
- Jim Reilly, Notre Dame (AFCA, AP-3, NEA-2)
- Dan Dierdorf, Michigan (College and Pro Football Halls of Fame) (CP-2)
- Larron Jackson, Missouri (AP-3)
- Bob Bouley, Boston College (CP-3)
- Manny Rodriguez, New Mexico State (CP-3)

=== Guards ===
- Bill Bridges, Houston (AFCA, AP-1, FWAA, NEA-2, UPI-2)
- Chip Kell, Tennessee (College Football Hall of Fame) (AFCA [center], AP-1, CP-1, FWAA, UPI-1, FN, WC)
- Ron Saul, Michigan State (AP-3, CP-1, NEA-1, Time, TSN)
- Larry DiNardo, Notre Dame (CP-2, UPI-1, WC)
- Mike Carroll, Missouri (NEA-1, TSN)
- Chuck Hutchison, Ohio State (Time)
- Alvin Samples, Alabama (AP-2, CP-2, UPI-2, FN)
- Steve Greer, Georgia (FN)
- Jerry Dossey, Arkansas (AP-2)
- Ed Chapupka, North Carolina (AP-3)
- Doug Redmann, Illinois (CP-3, NEA-2)
- Jon Meskimen, Iowa (CP-3)

=== Centers ===
- Rodney Brand, Arkansas (AP-1, CP-1, FWAA, NEA-1, UPI-1, FN, WC)
- Ken Mendenhall, Oklahoma (CP-2, UPI-2, FN, Time, TSN)
- Dale Evans, Kansas (AP-2)
- Dennis Bramlett, UTEP (NEA-2)
- Tom Banks, Auburn (AP-3)
- Jack Kovar, Texas A&M (CP-3)

=== Quarterbacks ===
- Mike Phipps, Purdue (College Football Hall of Fame) (AFCA, AP-1, CP-1, FWAA, NEA-1, UPI-1, FN, Time, TSN, WC)
- Archie Manning, Mississippi (College Football Hall of Fame) (AP-3, CP-2, NEA-1, UPI-2, FN)
- Jim Plunkett, Stanford (College Football Hall of Fame) (AP-2, CP-3)

=== Running backs ===
- Steve Owens, Oklahoma (College Football Hall of Fame) (AFCA [halfback], AP-1 [halfback], CP-1, FWAA, NEA-1, UPI-1, FN [halfback], Time, TSN, WC)
- Jim Otis, Ohio State (AP-1 [fullback], CP-1 [fullback], FWAA, UPI-1, FN [fullback], WC)
- Bobby Anderson, Colorado (College Football Hall of Fame) (AP-1 [halfback], NEA-1, UPI-1, TSN)
- Charlie Pittman, Penn State (AFCA [halfback], CP-3, UPI-2, Time)
- Steve Worster, Texas (AP-2 [fullback], CP-2 [fullback], FWAA, UPI-2, FN [fullback])
- Warren Muir, South Carolina (AP-3 [fullback], AFCA [fullback])
- Rex Kern, Ohio State (College Football Hall of Fame) (CP-1, FN [qb], NEA-2 [qb])
- John Isenbarger, Indiana (AP-2 [halfback], CP-2, FN [halfback])
- Mickey Cureton, UCLA (FN [halfback])
- Mack Herron, Kansas State (CP-2, FN [halfback])
- Jim Strong, Houston (AP-2)
- Art Malone, Arizona State (NEA-2)
- Greg Jones, UCLA (NEA-2)
- Jim Bertelsen, Texas (AP-3 [halfback])
- Ed Marinaro, Cornell (AP-3 [halfback])
- Clarence Davis, USC (CP-3, UPI-2)
- Jim Braxton, West Virginia (CP-3 [fullback])

== Defensive selections ==
=== Defensive ends ===
- Jimmy Gunn, USC (AFCA, AP-1, CP-1, FWAA, NEA-2, UPI-1, FN [end], WC)
- Phil Olsen, Utah State (AP-1, NEA-1, UPI-1, Time, TSN, WC)
- Al Cowlings, USC (AP-2 [defensive tackle], NEA-1, FN [guard], Time, TSN)
- Floyd Reese, UCLA (AFCA, AP-2 [defensive tackle])
- Bill Brundige, Colorado (AP-2, CP-3, FWAA, UPI-2)
- Dick Campbell, Texas Tech (CP-1, NEA-2)
- Bill Atessis, Texas (AP-2)
- Michael Berrera, Kansas State (CP-2)
- Mark Debvec, Ohio State (CP-2)
- David Campbell, Auburn (UPI-2)
- Irby Augustine, California (AP-3)
- Jeff Slipp, Brigham Young (AP-3)
- Hap Farber, Mississippi (CP-3)

=== Defensive tackles ===
- Mike Reid, Penn State (College Football Hall of Fame) (AFCA, AP-1, CP-1, FWAA, NEA-1, UPI-1, FN [tackle], Time, TSN, WC)
- Mike McCoy, Notre Dame (AFCA, AP-1, CP-1, FWAA, NEA-1, UPI-1, FN [tackle], Time, TSN, WC)
- Steve Smear, Penn State (CP-2, UPI-2)
- Rock Perdoni, Georgia Tech (AP-3, CP-2)
- John Little, Oklahoma State (NEA-2)
- Wes Grant, UCLA (NEA-2)
- Leo Brooks, Texas (UPI-2)
- Lynn Duncan, Wichita State (AP-3)
- Paul Schmidlin, Ohio State (CP-3)
- Larry Nels, Wyoming (CP-3)

=== Middle guard ===
- Jim Stillwagon, Ohio State (College Football Hall of Fame) (AFCA, AP-1, CP-1, NEA-1, UPI-1, FN [guard], WC)
- Carl Crennel, West Virginia (AP-2, CP-3, NEA-2, UPI-2)
- Steve Greer, Georgia (AP-3, CP-2)

=== Linebackers ===
- Steve Kiner, Tennessee (College Football Hall of Fame) (AFCA, AP-1, CP-1, FWAA, NEA-1, UPI-1, FN, Time, TSN, WC)
- Dennis Onkotz, Penn State (College Football Hall of Fame) (AP-1, CP-3, FWAA, UPI-1, FN, WC)
- Mike Ballou, UCLA (AFCA, AP-3, CP-1, FWAA, NEA-2, UPI-2, FN, WC)
- Don Parish, Stanford (AP-1, UPI-2, Time, TSN)
- John Small, The Citadel (AP-2, NEA-1, Time, TSN)
- George Bevan, LSU (AFCA, AP-2, CP-2, FWAA, NEA-2)
- Cliff Powell, Arkansas (AFCA, AP-3)
- Glen Halsell, Texas (CP-1, FN)
- Jim Corrigall, Kent State (College Football Hall of Fame) (AP-3, NEA-1)
- Jack Reynolds, Tennessee (CP-3, FN)
- Bob Olson, Notre Dame (AP-2, CP-2)
- Mike Kolen, Auburn (CP-2, NEA-2)
- Ralph Cindrich, Pittsburgh (CP-3)

=== Defensive backs ===
- Jack Tatum, Ohio State (College Football Hall of Fame) (AFCA, AP-1, CP-1, FWAA, NEA-1 [cornerback], UPI-1, FN, TSN, WC)
- Buddy McClinton, Auburn (AFCA, AP-1, CP-1, FWAA, UPI-1, FN, WC)
- Tom Curtis, Michigan (College Football Hall of Fame) (AP-1, CP-1, NEA-2 [safety], UPI-1, FN, WC)
- Glenn Cannon, Mississippi (AFCA, AP-3, UPI-2, Time, TSN)
- Neal Smith, Penn State (AP-3, NEA-1 [safety], UPI-1)
- Steve Tannen, Florida (UPI-2, Time, TSN)
- Ted Provost, Ohio State (UPI-2, Time, TSN)
- Tim Foley, Purdue, (CP-3, NEA-2 [cornerback], Time)
- Curtis Johnson, Toledo (AP-2, CP-3, NEA-1 [cornerback])
- Denton Fox, Texas Tech (AP-2, FWAA)
- Tommy Casanova, LSU (College Football Hall of Fame) (FN)
- Dana Stephenson, Nebraska (AP-2, CP-2)
- Mel Easley, Oregon State (CP-2)
- Mike Sensibaugh, Ohio State (CP-2)
- Bruce Taylor, Boston University (College Football Hall of Fame) (NEA-2 [cornerback])
- David Berrong, Memphis State (AP-3, CP-3)

== Special teams ==
=== Kicker ===
- Bob Jacobs, Wyoming (FWAA, TSN)

=== Punter ===
- Zenon Andrusyshyn, UCLA (TSN)

== Key ==
- **Bold** – Consensus All-American
- -1 – First-team selection
- -2 – Second-team selection
- -3 – Third-team selection

=== Official selectors ===
- AFCA = American Football Coaches Association picked for Kodak
- AP = Associated Press
- CP = Central Press Association, "picked with the help of the captains of the major college elevens"
- FWAA = Football Writers Association of America
- NEA = Newspaper Enterprise Association
- UPI = United Press International

=== Unofficial selectors ===
- FN = The Football News, consisting of the 33 best college football players as selected by the staff and correspondents of The Football News
- Time = Time magazine
- TSN = The Sporting News
- WC = Walter Camp Football Foundation

== See also ==
- 1969 All-Atlantic Coast Conference football team
- 1969 All-Big Eight Conference football team
- 1969 All-Big Ten Conference football team
- 1969 All-Pacific-8 Conference football team
- 1969 All-SEC football team
- 1969 All-Southwest Conference football team
