= Larry Willingham =

American football player (1948–2025)

No. 33
- Position: Defensive back

Personal information
- Born: December 22, 1948; Cullman, Alabama, U.S.
- Died: November 8, 2025 (aged 76)
- Listed height: 6 ft 0 in (1.83 m)
- Listed weight: 190 lb (86 kg)

Career information
- High school: Banks (Birmingham, Alabama)
- College: Auburn
- NFL draft: 1971: 4th round, 95th overall pick

Career history
- St. Louis Cardinals (1971–1972); Birmingham Americans (1974); Birmingham Vulcans (1975)

Awards and highlights
- Consensus All-American (1970); First-team All-SEC (1970); Second-team All-SEC (1969)
- Stats at Pro Football Reference

Larry Levi Willingham (December 22, 1948 – November 8, 2025) was an American professional football player who was a defensive back in the National Football League (NFL). He played in the NFL for the St. Louis Cardinals (1971–1972) and in the World Football League (WFL) for both the Birmingham Americans (1974) and Birmingham Vulcans (1975). He played college football for the Auburn Tigers, earning consensus All-American honors in 1970, and was selected by the Cardinals in the fourth round of the 1971 NFL draft. He was inducted into the Alabama Sports Hall of Fame in 2003.

== Early life ==
Willingham attended L. Frazier Banks High School in Birmingham, Alabama, where he was named to the Division 4A All-State Second-team as an end in 1966. He spent his college years at Auburn University where he played defensive back. Willingham was named second-team All-Southeastern Conference (SEC) in 1969 and first-team All-SEC in 1970. He was also selected to eight All-American teams in 1970. Willingham would later be named a member of Auburn's "Team of the Decade" for the 1970s and inducted into the Alabama Sports Hall of Fame in 2003.

== Professional career ==
Willingham began his injury-shortened professional career with the NFL's St. Louis Cardinals in 1971 as a defensive back. Seeing limited playing time, he was being forced to retire for medical reasons following the 1972 season. He came out of retirement in 1974 to play for the Birmingham Americans of the upstart World Football League. He helped the team win the World Bowl in December 1974. After the Americans folded, Willingham signed with the successor Birmingham Vulcans for the 1975 season.

== Death ==
Willingham died on November 8, 2025, at the age of 76.
