= Dan Sartin =

American football player (born 1946)

No. 64, 52, 75, 72
- Position: Defensive tackle

Personal information
- Born: June 23, 1946 (age 80); Gulfport, Mississippi, U.S.
- Listed height: 6 ft 1 in (1.85 m)
- Listed weight: 250 lb (113 kg)

Career information
- High school: Lumberton (Lumberton, Mississippi)
- College: Ole Miss (1964–1967)
- NFL draft: 1968: 4th round, 103rd overall pick

Career history
- Arkansas Diamonds (1968); San Diego Chargers (1969); Memphis Southmen (1974); Detroit Wheels (1974)

Awards and highlights
- Second-team All-SEC (1967)

Career AFL statistics
- Games played: 13
- Stats at Pro Football Reference

Daniel Matthias Sartin (born June 23, 1946) is an American former professional football player who was a defensive tackle for the San Diego Chargers of the American Football League (AFL) in 1969. He played college football for the Ole Miss Rebels.
