= Buddy McClinton =

American football player (born 1948)

Auburn Tigers
- Position: Defensive back

Personal information
- Born: September 10, 1948; Montgomery, Alabama, U.S.

Career information
- College: Auburn (1969)

Awards and highlights
- Consensus All-American (1969); 2× First-team All-SEC (1968, 1969); Second-team All-SEC (1967)

Buddy McClinton (born September 10, 1948) is a former defensive back for the Auburn University Tigers who was selected to the 1969 College Football All-America Team. As a safety that year, he set a school record for most interceptions in a season with nine. He also holds the school record for most career interceptions with 18. He lettered at Auburn from 1967 to 1969. He was the 1968 Sun Bowl Most Valuable Player. McClinton was born in Montgomery, Alabama.

He was elected to the Alabama Sports Hall of Fame in 2006, and the SEC Football Legends in 2011.
