= Julian Fagan =

American football player (born 1948)

No. 10
- Position: Punter

Personal information
- Born: February 21, 1948 (age 78); Laurel, Mississippi, U.S.
- Listed height: 6 ft 3 in (1.91 m)
- Listed weight: 205 lb (93 kg)

Career information
- College: Ole Miss
- NFL draft: 1970: 17th round, 430th overall pick

Career history
- New Orleans Saints (1970–1972); New York Jets (1973)

Awards and highlights
- 3× Second-team All-SEC (1967, 1968, 1969)

Career NFL statistics
- Punts: 299
- Average: 40.5
- Stats at Pro Football Reference

Julian Walter Fagan III (born February 21, 1948) is an American former professional football player who was a punter in the National Football League (NFL). He played college football for the Ole Miss Rebels. Fagan was selected 430th overall in the 17th round by the Houston Oilers in 1970, but he never played for them. He played for the New Orleans Saints and New York Jets.
