= Hap Farber =

American football player (born 1948)

No. 56
- Position: Linebacker

Personal information
- Born: July 1, 1948 (age 78); Norfolk, Virginia, U.S.
- Listed height: 6 ft 1 in (1.85 m)
- Listed weight: 220 lb (100 kg)

Career information
- High school: Murrah (Jackson, Mississippi)
- College: Ole Miss (1966–1969)
- NFL draft: 1970: 7th round, 181st overall pick

Career history
- Minnesota Vikings (1970); New Orleans Saints (1970)

Awards and highlights
- Third-team All-American (1969); First-team All-SEC (1969)
- Stats at Pro Football Reference

Louis Allen "Hap" Farber Jr. (born July 1, 1948) is an American former professional football player who was a linebacker for one season in the National Football League (NFL) with the Minnesota Vikings and New Orleans Saints. He was selected by the Vikings in the seventh round of the 1970 NFL draft after playing college football for the Ole Miss Rebels.

== Early life and college ==
Louis Allen Farber Jr. was born on July 1, 1948, in Norfolk, Virginia. He attended Murrah High School in Jackson, Mississippi.

Farber was a member of the Ole Miss Rebels of the University of Mississippi from 1966 to 1969 and a three-year letterman from 1967 to 1969. As a senior defensive end in 1969, he earned Central Press Association third-team All-American and consensus first-team All-SEC honors.

== Professional career ==
Farber was selected by the Minnesota Vikings in the seventh round, with the 181st overall pick, of the 1970 NFL draft. On August 11, he left the team during training camp to straighten out his U.S. draft status. However, he returned several days later. On September 19, a day before the start of the regular season, it was reported that Farber had been activated. He played in three games for Vikings that year before being moved to the team's taxi squad. He was released from the taxi squad on October 29, 1970.

On November 10, 1970, it was reported that Farber had signed with the New Orleans Saints. He was promoted to the active roster on November 21 and played in five games for the Saints that year. On July 10, 1971, Farber suffered a leg injury on the first day of training camp. He then left the team the next day.
