= Jake Scott =

American football player (1945–2020)

No. 13
- Positions: Safety, return specialist, wide receiver (CFL only)

Personal information
- Born: July 20, 1945; Greenwood, South Carolina, U.S.
- Died: November 19, 2020 (aged 75); Atlanta, Georgia, U.S.
- Listed height: 6 ft 0 in (1.83 m)
- Listed weight: 188 lb (85 kg)

Career information
- High school: Bullis School (Potomac, Maryland)
- College: Georgia (1966–1968)
- NFL draft: 1970: 7th round, 159th overall pick

Career history
- BC Lions (1969); Miami Dolphins (1970–1975); Washington Redskins (1976–1978)

Awards and highlights
- 2× Super Bowl champion (VII, VIII); Super Bowl MVP (VII); 2× First-team All-Pro (1973, 1974); 3× Second-team All-Pro (1971, 1972, 1975); 5× Pro Bowl (1971–1975); Miami Dolphin Honor Roll; Consensus All-American (1968); SEC Player of the Year (1968); 2× First-team All-SEC (1967, 1968); Florida–Georgia Hall of Fame

Career NFL statistics
- Games played: 126
- Games started: 126
- Interceptions: 49
- Interception return yards: 551
- Return yards: 1,474
- Stats at Pro Football Reference
- College Football Hall of Fame

Jacob E. Scott III (July 20, 1945 – November 19, 2020) was an American professional football player who was a safety and punt returner from 1970 to 1978 for the Miami Dolphins and Washington Redskins of the National Football League (NFL). He played college football for Georgia, and was selected by the Dolphins in the seventh round of the 1970 NFL draft.

Scott went to the Pro Bowl five consecutive times between 1971 and 1975. He recorded 35 interceptions in his six seasons as a Dolphin, and another 14 in his three years with the Redskins. To this day, he remains the Miami Dolphins all-time leader in interceptions with 35. He was also a five-time first or second team All-Pro, and won back-to-back Super Bowl Championships in 1972 and 1973, including winning the MVP of Super Bowl VII.

Scott wore number 13 throughout his career, which was later made famous in Miami by Dan Marino, and has since been retired in Marino's honor.

== College career ==
After growing up in Athens, Georgia, but playing high school football in Arlington, Virginia at Washington-Lee High School, and then eventually Bullis School in Potomac, Maryland for 2 years Scott played college football at the University of Georgia, where he led Georgia in interceptions in 1967 with six interceptions and 1968 with ten interceptions. In 1967, Scott was named first-team All-SEC defensive back by the Associated Press, and in 1968 again in both the AP and the UPI. The ten interceptions in a season is now second-most in Georgia history behind Terry Hoage’s 12 in 1982. Scott's 175 return yards on interceptions in 1968 is also second all-time for Georgia.

Scott's college career total of 315 interception return yards was the most in school history until 2017. He also holds the current Georgia record for career interceptions.

Scott was inducted into the Georgia Sports Hall of Fame in 1986 and the Athens (GA) Athletic Hall of Fame in 2000.

It was announced on May 17, 2011, that Scott had been selected for induction into the College Football Hall of Fame.

Scott left the University of Georgia after his Junior year to go to Canada and play professional football in the CFL. Based on his July 20 birth date, Scott's military draft lottery number of record was 187. The highest administrative draft number called for Scott's year group was 195, suggesting that Scott could have been, but was not, drafted for military service during the Vietnam War as he had previously served in the U.S. Marines.

== Professional career ==
Scott began his professional career in 1969 in the Canadian Football League as a flanker and kick returner with the BC Lions. In his one season with the Lions he played in 11 games caught 35 passes for 596 yards and three touchdowns, all marks which were good for second best or tied for second best on the team. He also recorded 224 kickoff return yards, which led the team. The BC Lions finished with a record of 5–11.

He was selected by the Miami Dolphins during the seventh round, 159th overall, in the 1970 NFL draft, where in his rookie year, he recorded five interceptions and returned one punt for a touchdown. The following year, he recorded seven interceptions and 318 punt return yards, helping the team reach Super Bowl VI, which they lost 24–3 to the Dallas Cowboys. Scott recorded a 21-yard punt return in the game.

Scott was a key member of the 1972 Miami Dolphins undefeated season, and was named Super Bowl MVP of Super Bowl VII, recording two interceptions in the Dolphins' 14–7 win over the Washington Redskins including one in the fourth quarter. He helped the Dolphins in their 24-7 Super Bowl VIII win, recording two fumble recoveries, 20 punt return yards, and 47 kickoff return yards in that game. He established two Super Bowl records. Scott set a record by being the first player to recover 2 fumbles in one game. He also first established the record for most career fumble recoveries in Super Bowls at two, a record now shared by 12 others. Scott is still the only player to have recovered one of his own team's fumbles and one of his opponent's fumbles in a single Super Bowl game.

Overall, Scott finished his nine seasons with 49 interceptions. He made 35 interceptions playing 6 seasons for Miami, making him the Dolphins' all-time leader in that category. Scott had 13 fumble recoveries in his career. On special teams, he gained 1,357 yards and a touchdown returning punts, and 137 yards on six kickoff returns. Scott played for the Redskins the final 3 years of his career.

While best known for his defensive play, Scott also returned punts. In week 10 of his rookie season against the Baltimore Colts, he returned a punt 77 yards for his first and only NFL touchdown. He led the NFL in punt return yards in 1971 with 318 and finished top ten in punt returns yards a total of four times over his NFL career. He finished his NFL career with 1,357 punt return yards with a 10.4 yards per return average, and an additional 137 kick return yards. No player had more interceptions than Scott in the 1970s.

In the late 1980s, NFL Films named Scott as the Dolphins All-Time Neutralizer sponsored by Tums. He was inducted into the Georgia-Florida Hall of Fame in 1998. The Professional Football Researchers Association named Scott to the PFRA Hall of Very Good Class of 2007.

Scott was one of only three living Super Bowl MVPs who did not attend Super Bowl XL, when all previous MVPs were honored prior to the game; the other no-shows were Terry Bradshaw and Joe Montana. Scott did attend Super Bowl 50 and was introduced during pre-game festivities.

Scott was inducted with Bill Stanfill into the Miami Dolphins Honor Roll on November 18, 2010.

== Career statistics ==
Legend
	Won the Super Bowl
	Super Bowl MVP
**Bold**	Career high

=== Regular season ===
Year	Team	Games		Interceptions				Fum			
Year	Team	GP	GS	Int	Yards	TD	Lng	Fmb	FR	Yards	TD
1970	MIA	14	14	5	**112**	0	**47**	1	1	0	0
1971	MIA	14	14	7	34	0	21	**3**	2	0	0
1972	MIA	14	14	5	73	0	31	1	2	**20**	0
1973	MIA	14	14	4	71	0	29	1	0	0	0
1974	MIA	14	14	**8**	75	0	30	2	1	14	0
1975	MIA	14	14	6	60	0	38	0	1	0	0
1976	WAS	12	12	4	12	0	6	1	**5**	0	0
1977	WAS	14	14	3	42	0	25	0	1	1	0
1978	WAS	**16**	**16**	7	72	0	39	0	0	0	0
Career		126	126	49	551	0	47	9	13	35	0

== Personal life and death ==
Scott was born in Greenwood, South Carolina, the son of Mary (Hughie), an educator, and Jacob Eugene Scott, a pulp wood contractor. He moved to Athens, Georgia as a child.

Scott was a lifelong bachelor, who enjoyed fishing and traveling. A private individual known for shunning the spotlight, Scott had lived in the Colorado mountains and the Florida Keys, and spent his later years living in Hanalei, a small town on the Hawaiian island of Kauai. During his retirement Scott was an investor in Hawaii.

Scott had a falling out with at the time Miami Dolphins Head Coach Don Shula which eventually resulted in his trade to the Washington Redskins and lasted well into his retirement. As a result, he did not participate in Dolphins alumni events for several decades. Many years later, the two reconciled, and Scott later attended his Miami Dolphins Honor Roll enshrinement as well as Super Bowl 50. Scott was quoted, “Coach Shula and I had our differences, but time heals all wounds,”

Scott died at the age of 75 on November 19, 2020, after falling down a flight of steps while visiting friends in Atlanta, Georgia. He is one of at least 345 NFL players to be diagnosed after death with chronic traumatic encephalopathy (CTE), which is caused by repeated hits to the head.

Scott was cremated and his ashes were spread in the waters of Hanalei Bay. Memorabilia from Scott's personal collection, including his Super Bowl rings, were sold at auction, as per his final wishes.
