= Charlie Collins (Canadian football) =

American gridiron football player (1946–2012)

Profile
- Position: Running back

Personal information
- Born: January 24, 1946; Marietta, Georgia, U.S.
- Died: February 23, 2012 (aged 66); Smyrna, Georgia, U.S.
- Listed height: 6 ft 2 in (1.88 m)
- Listed weight: 225 lb (102 kg)

Career information
- High school: Campbell (Smyrna, Georgia)
- College: Auburn

Career history
- 1968–1970: Montreal Alouettes
- 1971–1975: Saskatchewan Roughriders

Awards and highlights
- Grey Cup champion (1970); Second-team All-SEC (1967)

Charles Herman Collins (January 24, 1946 – February 23, 2012) was an American professional football player who played for the Saskatchewan Roughriders and Montreal Alouettes. He won the Grey Cup with Montreal in 1970. He previously played college football at Auburn University in Alabama. In 2012, he died in a car accident at the age of 66.
