= Archie Manning =

American football player (born 1949)

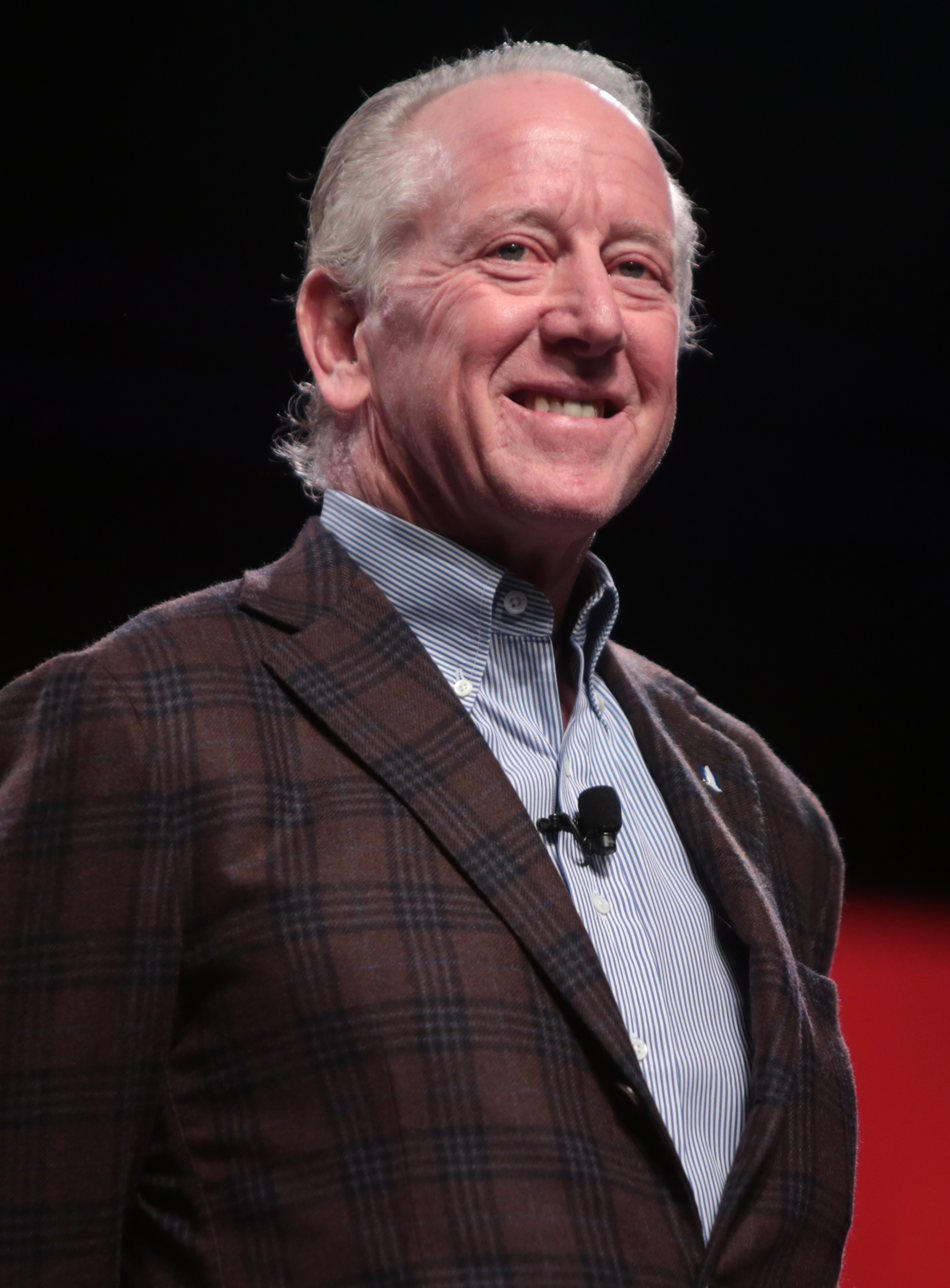
- Manning in 2017

No. 8, 4
- Position: Quarterback

Personal information
- Born: May 19, 1949 (age 77); Drew, Mississippi, U.S.
- Listed height: 6 ft 3 in (1.91 m)
- Listed weight: 212 lb (96 kg)

Career information
- High school: Drew
- College: Ole Miss (1968–1970)
- NFL draft: 1971: 1st round, 2nd overall pick

Career history
- New Orleans Saints (1971–1982); Houston Oilers (1982–1983); Minnesota Vikings (1983–1984)

Awards and highlights
- UPI NFC Player of the Year (1978); Sporting News NFC Player of the Year (1978); 2× Pro Bowl (1978, 1979); New Orleans Saints Ring of Honor; New Orleans Saints Hall of Fame; NFLPA Alan Page Community Award (1978); Jack Horrigan Award (1983); SEC Player of the Year (1969); Walter Camp Memorial Trophy (1969); First-team All-American (1969); 2× First-team All-SEC (1969, 1970); SEC All-Time Team (1982); SEC Football Legends; Ole Miss Team of the Century; Ole Miss Rebels No. 18 retired; Gator Bowl Hall of Fame (1989); Sugar Bowl Hall of Fame (2017); Reds Bagnell Award (2011); Walter Camp Distinguished American Award (2018)

Career NFL statistics
- Passing attempts: 3,642
- Passing completions: 2,011
- Completion percentage: 55.2%
- TD–INT: 125–173
- Passing yards: 23,911
- Passer rating: 67.1
- Rushing yards: 2,197
- Rushing touchdowns: 18
- Stats at Pro Football Reference
- College Football Hall of Fame

Elisha Archibald Manning III (born May 19, 1949) is an American former professional football quarterback who played in the National Football League (NFL) for 14 seasons, primarily with the New Orleans Saints. The patriarch of the Manning football dynasty, he is the father of quarterbacks Peyton and Eli Manning.

Manning played college football for the Ole Miss Rebels, winning SEC Player of the Year and the Walter Camp Memorial Trophy in 1969. He was selected second overall in the 1971 NFL draft by the Saints, where he spent his first 12 seasons and received two Pro Bowl selections. During his final two seasons, he was a member of the Houston Oilers and the Minnesota Vikings. He was inducted to the College Football Hall of Fame in 1989. Manning was also an inaugural inductee of the New Orleans Saints Hall of Fame in 1988 and the New Orleans Saints Ring of Honor in 2013.

== Early life ==
Born in Drew, Mississippi, Manning is the son of Jane Elizabeth (née Nelson) and Elisha Archibald Manning Jr. He grew up heavily involved in football, basketball, baseball, and track. His father, known as "Buddy", was interested in Archie's sports activities, but the nature of his job left him little if any time for attending games. Instead, Archie III drew his inspiration from a local high school sports star, James Hobson. His mother was "a ubiquitous presence at all of his games, no matter what the sport or level." Manning attended Drew High School. Manning was selected in the Major League Baseball draft four times, first in 1967 by the Braves, twice by the White Sox, and finally by the Royals in 1971.

In the summer of 1969, his father Buddy Manning, facing financial struggles and having suffered a stroke, died by suicide. Archie, who was home from college for summer vacation, was the first to discover Buddy's body. In the biopic-documentary The Book of Manning, Manning said that he considered dropping out and getting a job to support his mother and sister, but his mother persuaded him to return to college and not put his rising football career to waste.

== College career ==
Manning attended the University of Mississippi in Oxford and was the starting quarterback at Ole Miss for three years under head coach Johnny Vaught. In one of the first national prime time broadcasts of a college football game (on ABC, October 4, 1969), Manning threw for 436 yards and three touchdowns, also rushing for 104 yards, in a 33–32 loss to Alabama. His performance set Southeastern Conference (SEC) records for passing yards, completions and total offense, with the total offense record standing for 43 years before being broken by Johnny Manziel in 2012.

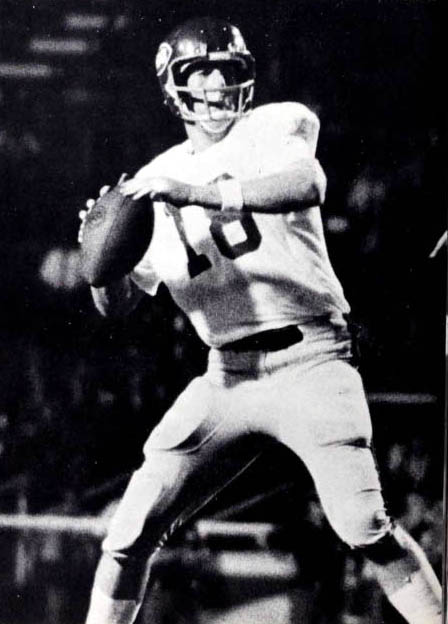
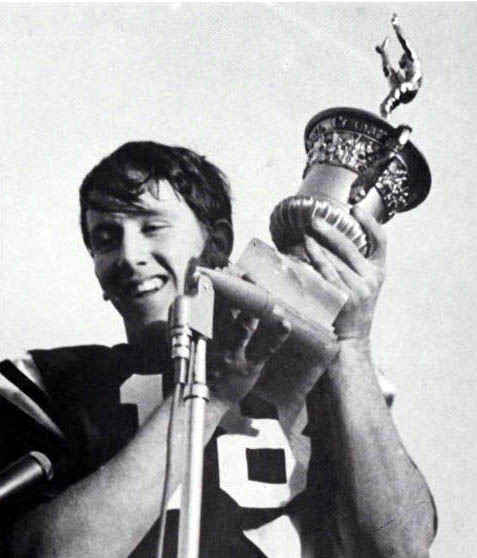
Two moments during Manning's time at Ole Miss: throwing a pass in 1969 (left), celebrating in the 1970 Sugar Bowl (right)

During Manning's last two seasons at Ole Miss, the Rebels had a record of 15–7. In his college career, he threw 4,753 yards and 31 touchdowns (despite 40 interceptions) and ran for 823 yards. He scored 14 touchdowns in 1969. In both 1969 and 1970, he was named to the All-SEC team and his No. 18 jersey was retired by Ole Miss. In 1969, Manning was Mississippi Sportsman of the Year and recipient of the Nashville Banner Trophy as Most Valuable Player in the Southeastern Conference (SEC) in addition to winning the Walter Camp Memorial Trophy. He was fourth in the Heisman Trophy voting in 1969 and third in 1970. He was also inducted into Omicron Delta Kappa in 1970 at Mississippi.

Manning was inducted to the College Football Hall of Fame in 1989. He was honored as the inaugural inductee into the Gator Bowl Hall of Fame in 1989 and the Sugar Bowl Hall of Fame in 2017. He was also inducted into the University's Hall of Fame in 1971 and M-Club Hall of Fame in 1991. Manning's legacy is honored on the Ole Miss campus, where the speed limit is 18 miles per hour in honor of Manning's jersey number which is retired by the Rebels. During his time at Ole Miss, Manning was a member of Sigma Nu fraternity and was inducted into their Hall of Fame in 1998. He was named SEC Quarterback of the Quarter Century (1950–75) by several publications.

== Professional career ==
Manning was the second overall pick in the 1971 NFL draft and played for the New Orleans Saints for ten full seasons. During his tenure in New Orleans, the Saints had nine losing seasons. They reached .500 only once, in 1979, the only season they finished higher than third in the division. Nevertheless, he was well-respected by NFL peers. For example, although Manning was sacked 337 times during his Saints career, Sports Illustrated senior writer Paul Zimmerman wrote in 2007 that the number should have been even higher than that. Zimmerman wrote that opposing defensive linemen, "Jack Youngblood in particular" as well as most of the division rival Rams, were known to take it easy on the poorly protected Manning and not hit him as hard as they could. For his part, Manning seemed to appreciate Youngblood's kindness, telling the Los Angeles Times on September 23, 1974, "The Rams front four is the best I ever faced ... I've got to say that Youngblood was nice enough to pick me up every time he knocked my ass off." Today, Manning jokes that Youngblood's career would not have been as successful without him. He even stated that Youngblood should have let him be his presenter when he was inducted into the Pro Football Hall of Fame in 2001, saying, "He wouldn't have gotten in without having me to sack."

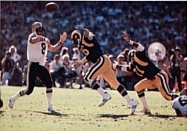
Manning (left) attempting a pass for the Saints against the L.A. Rams in 1980

In 1972, he led the league in pass attempts and completions and led the National Football Conference in passing yards, though the team's record was only 2–11–1. Manning sat out the entire 1976 season after corrective surgery on his right shoulder, spending the second half of that season in the team's radio booth after Dick Butkus abruptly quit his position as color commentator. In 1978, he was named the NFC Player of the Year by UPI after leading the Saints to a 7–9 record. That same year, Archie was also named All-NFC by both the UPI and The Sporting News.

Manning was selected to the Pro Bowl in 1978 and 1979. He finished his career with the Houston Oilers (1982–1983) and the Minnesota Vikings (1983–1984). He ended his 13-year career having completed 2,011 of 3,642 passes for 23,911 yards, 125 touchdowns, and 173 interceptions. He also rushed for 2,197 yards and 18 touchdowns. His 2,011 completions ranked 17th in NFL history upon his retirement. His record as a starter was 35–101–3 (26.3%), the worst in NFL history among QBs with at least 100 starts. He retired having never played on a team that notched a winning record or made the playoffs. Indeed, he is one of the few players to have played 10 or more years in the NFL without taking part in an official playoff game.

The Saints have not reissued Manning's No. 8 since he left the team midway through the 1982 season. While it has not been formally retired, it has long been understood that no Saint will ever wear it again.

== Career statistics ==
=== NFL ===
Legend
	Led the league
**Bold**	Career high

Year	Team	Games			Passing								
Year	Team	GP	GS	Record	Cmp	Att	Pct	Yds	Avg	TD	Int	Lng	Rtg
1971	NO	12	10	3−5−2	86	177	48.6	1,164	6.6	6	9	63	60.1
1972	NO	14	14	2−11−1	230	448	51.3	2,781	6.2	18	**21**	66	64.6
1973	NO	13	13	5−8	140	267	52.4	1,642	6.1	10	12	65	65.2
1974	NO	11	11	3−8	134	261	51.3	1,429	5.5	6	16	79	49.8
1975	NO	13	13	2−11	159	338	47	1,683	5.0	7	20	71	44.3
1976	NO	0	0	Did not play due to injury									
1977	NO	10	9	1−8	113	205	55.1	1,284	5.0	8	9	59	68.8
1978	NO	16	16	7−9	291	471	**61.8**	3,416	7.3	17	16	71	81.7
1979	NO	16	16	**8−8**	252	420	60	3,169	7.5	15	20	**85**	75.6
1980	NO	16	16	1−15	**309**	**509**	60.7	**3,716**	7.3	**23**	20	56	**81.8**
1981	NO	12	11	3−8	134	232	57.8	1,447	6.2	5	11	55	63.6
1982	NO	1	0	—	1	7	14.3	3	0.4	0	2	3	0.0
1982	HOU	6	5	0−5	67	132	52.8	877	7.0	6	6	54	71.3
1983	HOU	3	3	0−3	44	88	50	755	**8.6**	2	8	47	49.2
1983	MIN	2	0	—	0	0	0.0	0	0.0	0	0	0	0.0
1984	MIN	6	2	0−2	52	94	55.3	545	5.8	2	3	56	66.1
Career		151	139	35−101−3	2,011	3,642	55.2	23,911	6.6	125	173	85	67.1

=== College ===
Season	Team	Passing							Rushing			
Season	Team	Cmp	Att	Yds	Pct	TD	Int	Rtg	Att	Yds	Avg	TD
1968	Ole Miss	127	263	1,510	48.3	8	17	93.6	110	208	1.9	5
1969	Ole Miss	154	265	1,762	58.1	9	9	118.4	124	502	4.0	14
1970	Ole Miss	121	233	1,481	51.9	14	14	113.1	80	113	1.4	6
Career		402	761	4,753	52.8	31	40	108.2	314	823	2.6	25

== Post-NFL career ==
Manning continues to make his home in New Orleans, though he also owns a condo in Oxford, Mississippi, to which he relocated following Hurricane Katrina. He has served as an analyst with the Saints' radio and television broadcasts, and has worked as a commentator for CBS Sports' college football broadcasts. Archie has also appeared as a commercial spokesman for products in Southeast Louisiana, where he remains popular with many fans. Working with his three sons, Cooper, Peyton, and Eli, Archie hosts the Manning Passing Academy each summer. This camp brings together young players from grades 8–12 who work with high school coaches and college players. In 2007, Manning was awarded the Silver Buffalo Award by the Boy Scouts of America. The Silver Buffalo is the highest award given for service to youth on a national basis.

In 2007, Manning was hired as a spokesman for a United Parcel Service contest to promote its "Delivery Intercept" service. He appeared in an advertising campaign for the UPS Delivery Intercept Challenge Video Contest, which saw amateur videos of football interceptions from high school and youth games. Among the prizes were a tailgate party with Manning as well as Manning-autographed footballs.

In October 2013, Manning was selected to be one of the 13 inaugural members of The College Football Playoff Selection Committee. He is one of three appointees who are members of the College Football Hall of Fame.

In 2014, for health reasons, he stepped down from the College Football Playoff Committee.

Manning owns a football-themed restaurant called Manning's Sports Bar and Grill, located in Caesars New Orleans.

== Family ==
Archie Manning is married to Olivia Manning. They met while at Ole Miss. The couple has three sons: Cooper, Peyton, and Eli. Cooper was diagnosed with spinal stenosis prior to his freshman year of college, which ended his football career. Peyton played 18 years in the NFL, winning two Super Bowls and a record five NFL MVPs among many other accolades. He was inducted into the Pro Football Hall of Fame in 2021. Eli, who played 16 years in the NFL, won two Super Bowls in 2008 and 2012, earning the MVP award for both games. Cooper's son, Arch, the top-rated high school quarterback in the class of 2023, is a member of the University of Texas football team.
