= Eddie Ray =

American football player (born 1947)

No. 36, 44, 38
- Position: Running back

Personal information
- Born: April 5, 1947 (age 79); Vicksburg, Mississippi, U.S.
- Listed height: 6 ft 2 in (1.88 m)
- Listed weight: 240 lb (109 kg)

Career information
- High school: St. Aloysius (Vicksburg)
- College: LSU
- NFL draft: 1970: 4th round, 83rd overall pick

Career history
- Boston Patriots (1970); San Diego Chargers (1971); Atlanta Falcons (1972–1974); Buffalo Bills (1976)

Awards and highlights
- 2× First-team All-SEC (1967, 1969)

Career NFL statistics
- Rushing attempts-yards: 191-691
- Receptions-yards: 33-275
- Touchdowns: 11
- Stats at Pro Football Reference

Edward Brown Ray Jr. (born April 5, 1947) is an American former professional football player who was a running back for six seasons in the National Football League (NFL) for the Boston Patriots, San Diego Chargers, Atlanta Falcons, and the Buffalo Bills. He played college football for the LSU Tigers.
