= Tommy Durrance =

American football player (1950–2005)

No. 33 – Florida Gators
- Position: Halfback

Personal information
- Born: February 8, 1950
- Died: July 22, 2005 (aged 55); Ormond Beach, Florida, U.S.

Career information
- High school: Mainland
- College: Florida (1969–1971)

Awards and highlights
- First-team All-SEC (1969)

Thomas L. Durrance (February 8, 1950 – July 22, 2005) was a college football player. He was a prominent halfback for the Florida Gators of the University of Florida from 1969 to 1971; one of the "Super Sophs". During his sophomore season, he scored 110 points—then the school record, and still tied for second on the Gators' single-season records list. He was only the second person in SEC history to score 100. His 18 touchdowns gave him the nickname of "Touchdown Tommy." Durrance finished his three-year college career with 2,582 yards of combined rushing and receiving yardage. He was from Daytona Beach.

== See also ==
- List of University of Florida Athletic Hall of Fame members
