= Spike Jones (American football) =

American football player (born 1947)

No. 11, 10, 6
- Position: Punter

Personal information
- Born: July 9, 1947 (age 79); Louisville, Georgia, U.S.
- Listed height: 6 ft 2 in (1.88 m)
- Listed weight: 197 lb (89 kg)

Career information
- College: Georgia
- NFL draft: 1970: 4th round, 92nd overall pick

Career history
- Houston Oilers (1970); Buffalo Bills (1971–1974); Philadelphia Eagles (1975–1977)

Awards and highlights
- 2× First-team All-SEC (1968, 1969)

Career NFL statistics
- Punts: 592
- Punt yards: 23,244
- Punt long: 73
- Stats at Pro Football Reference

John Amos "Spike" Jones (born July 9, 1947) is an American former professional football player who was a punter for eight seasons in the National Football League (NFL), primarily for the Buffalo Bills and the Philadelphia Eagles. He played college football for the Georgia Bulldogs.

== NFL career statistics ==
Legend
	Led the league
**Bold**	Career high

Year	Team	Punting									
Year	Team	GP	Punts	Yds	Net Yds	Lng	Avg	Net Avg	Blk	Ins20	TB
1970	HOU	**14**	84	**3,559**	2,998	**73**	**42.4**	**35.3**	1	-	6
1971	BUF	13	72	2,966	2,442	62	41.2	33.5	1	-	6
1972	BUF	**14**	80	3,104	2,675	67	38.8	33.0	1	-	5
1973	BUF	**14**	66	2,660	2,248	62	40.3	34.1	0	-	5
1974	BUF	8	35	1,305	1,013	56	37.3	28.9	0	-	2
1975	PHI	12	68	2,742	2,139	64	40.3	31.5	0	-	6
1976	PHI	**14**	**94**	3,445	2,900	57	36.6	29.9	**3**	**23**	**7**
1977	PHI	**14**	93	3,463	**3,119**	68	37.2	32.8	2	22	5
Career		103	592	23,244	19,534	73	39.3	32.6	8	45	42
