= Charles Rosenfelder =

American football player

Charles Rosenfeder
No. 65
- Position: Offensive guard

Personal information
- Born: c. 1947

Career information
- High school: Humboldt (Humboldt, Tennessee)
- College: Tennessee (1966–1968)

Awards and highlights
- Unanimous All-American (1968); 2× First-team All-SEC (1967, 1968)

Charles Rosenfelder is an American former football player. He played at the guard position for the Tennessee Volunteers football team from 1966 to 1968. He was an All-Southeastern Conference player in 1967 and 1968 and a consensus first-team selection on the 1968 College Football All-America Team.
