= Zaunbrecher =

Zaunbrecher is a surname. Notable people with the surname include:

- Ed Zaunbrecher (born 1950), American football coach
- Godfrey Zaunbrecher (born 1946-september 19th 2023), American football player
