= 1969 All-SEC football team =

American college football all-star team

The 1969 All-SEC football team consists of American football players selected to the All-Southeastern Conference (SEC) chosen by various selectors for the 1969 NCAA University Division football season. Tennessee won the conference.

== Offensive selections ==
=== Receivers ===
- Sammy Milner, Miss. St. (AP-1, UPI)
- Carlos Alvarez, Florida (AP-1, UPI)
- Floyd Franks, Ole Miss (AP-2)
- Terry Beasley, Auburn (AP-2)

=== Tight ends ===
- Ken Delong, Tennessee (UPI)

=== Tackles ===
- Bob Asher, Vanderbilt (AP-1, UPI)
- Mac Steen, Florida (AP-2, UPI)
- Danny Ford, Alabama (AP-1)
- Richard Cheek, Auburn (AP-2)

=== Guards ===
- Al Samples, Alabama (AP-1, UPI)
- Chip Kell, Tennessee (College Football Hall of Fame) (AP-1, UPI)
- Donnie Williams, Florida (AP-2)
- Skip Jernigan, Ole Miss (AP-2)

=== Centers ===
- Tom Banks, Auburn (AP-1)
- Godfrey Zaunbrecher, LSU (UPI)
- Mike Bevans, Tennessee (AP-2)

=== Quarterbacks ===
- Archie Manning, Ole Miss (College Football Hall of Fame) (AP-1, UPI)Commercial Appeal All South
- John Reaves, Florida (AP-1)
- Pat Sullivan, Auburn (College Football Hall of Fame) (AP-2)

=== Running backs ===
- Curt Watson, Tennessee (AP-1, UPI)
- Eddie Ray, LSU (AP-1)
- Tommy Durrance, Florida (UPI)
- Johnny Musso, Alabama (AP-2)
- Connie Frederick, Auburn (AP-2)

== Defensive selections ==
=== Ends ===
- Hap Farber, Ole Miss (AP-1, UPI-1), Commercial Appeal All South, Central Press Captain's All-American Team (CP-3)
- David Ghesquiere, Florida (AP-1)
- Dick Palmer, Kentucky (AP-2)
- Neal Dettmering, Auburn (AP-2)

=== Tackles ===
- Dave Roller, Kentucky (AP-1, UPI [as E])
- Frank Yanossy, Tennessee (AP-2, UPI)
- David Campbell, Auburn (UPI)
- Buz Morrow, Ole Miss (AP-2)Commercial Appeal All South

=== Middle guard ===
- Steve Greer, Georgia (AP-1, UPI)

=== Linebackers ===
- Steve Kiner, Tennessee (College Football Hall of Fame) (AP-1, UPI)
- Mike Kolen, Auburn (AP-1, UPI)
- George Bevan, LSU (AP-1, UPI)
- Jack Reynolds, Tennessee (AP-1)
- Chip Wisdom, Georgia (AP-2)
- Joe Federspiel, Kentucky (AP-2)
- Larry Thomas, Ole Miss (AP-2)
- Bobby Strickland, Auburn (AP-2)

=== Backs ===
- Buddy McClinton, Auburn (AP-1, UPI)
- Tommy Casanova, LSU (College Football Hall of Fame) (AP-1, UPI)
- Glenn Cannon, Ole Miss (AP-1, UPI)Commercial Appeal All South
- Tim Priest, Tennessee (AP-2)
- Steve Tannen, Florida (AP-2)
- Larry Willingham, Auburn (AP-2)

== Special teams ==
=== Kicker ===
- John Riley, Auburn (AP-1)
- Mark Lumpkin, LSU (AP-2)

=== Punter ===
- Spike Jones, Georgia (AP-1)
- Julian Fagan, Ole Miss (AP-2)

== Key ==
AP = Associated Press

UPI = United Press International.

Bold = Consensus first-team selection by both AP and UPI

== See also ==
- 1969 College Football All-America Team
