= Tommy Casanova =

American football player and politician (born 1950)

Member of the Louisiana State Senate from the 26th district
- In office January 8, 1996 – January 10, 2000
- Preceded by: Armand Brinkhaus
- Succeeded by: Fred Hoyt

Personal details
- Born: July 29, 1950 (age 76) Crowley, Louisiana, U.S.
- Party: Republican
- Education: Louisiana State University (BS); University of Cincinnati (MD)
- Football career

No. 37
- Position: Safety

Personal information
- Listed height: 6 ft 2 in (1.88 m)
- Listed weight: 202 lb (92 kg)

Career information
- High school: Notre Dame (Crowley, Louisiana)
- College: LSU (1969–1971)
- NFL draft: 1972: 2nd round, 29th overall pick

Career history
- Cincinnati Bengals (1972–1977)

Awards and highlights
- First-team All-Pro (1976); 3× Pro Bowl (1974, 1976, 1977); Cincinnati Bengals 50th Anniversary Team; 2× Consensus All-American (1970, 1971); 3× First-team All-SEC (1969–1971); LSU Tigers No. 37 retired

Career NFL statistics
- Interceptions: 17
- Interception yards: 276
- Fumble recoveries: 3
- Total touchdowns: 4
- Stats at Pro Football Reference
- College Football Hall of Fame

Thomas Henry Casanova III (born July 29, 1950) is an American former professional football player and politician. He played six seasons for the Cincinnati Bengals of the National Football League (NFL) as a safety and was selected to three Pro Bowls and was named an All-Pro in 1976. He played college football for the LSU Tigers, where he was a twice consensus All-American. He is a Republican former member of the Louisiana State Senate, having served a single term from 1996 to 2000.

== Early life and college ==
Casanova attended the Roman Catholic Notre Dame High School in Crowley, Louisiana. As a senior at Notre Dame, he was chosen to play in the Louisiana High School Coaches Association all-star game.

After high school, Casanova attended Louisiana State University in Baton Rouge, where he played for the LSU Tigers football team. He was a running back, kick returner, and defensive back for the Tigers. As a freshman in 1968, he led the Bayou Bengals in rushing with 209 yards on 54 attempts. He also returned punts and kickoffs, and was a defensive standout.

In 1969, Casanova's first year on the varsity, he was shifted to cornerback. LSU fielded four defensive All-Americans in linebackers George Bevan and Mike Anderson, defensive tackle Ron Estay, and Casanova. Casanova was recognized as a first-team All-American by Football News. The Tigers lost only one game that year, to arch-rival Ole Miss.

As a junior in 1970, Casanova was a consensus All-American. He earned first-team honors from the Associated Press (AP) and American Football Coaches Association (AFCA), and second-team honors from United Press International (UPI) and the Central Press. In a 61–17 rout of Ole Miss in the final game of the regular season, Casanova had punt return touchdowns of 61 and 73 yards, tying the NCAA record for punt return touchdowns in a game.

Prior to his senior year in 1971, Casanova was featured on the front cover of the September 13, 1971 issue of Sports Illustrated, with the headline, "Tommy Casanova of LSU, Best Player in the Nation." In the second game of the season, against Texas A&M, Casanova pulled his right hamstring muscle and subsequently missed the next five games. He recorded his only interception of the year later that season in a nationally televised 28–8 victory over No. 7 Notre Dame. Despite missing nearly half the season due to injury, Casanova was again a consensus All-American, earning first-team recognition from the Football Writers Association of America and UPI. After his college career, Casanova played in the 1972 Chicago College All-Star Game against the Dallas Cowboys. His defensive play was lauded in the All-Stars' 20–7 loss.

Casanova was inducted into the College Football Hall of Fame in 1995. In 2000, the Walter Camp Football Foundation selected Casanova for their All-Century team, honoring the best college football players of the 20th century. His jersey number 37 was retired by LSU football on October 10, 2009. NFL and collegiate coach Pete Carroll has stated that Casanova was one of his all-time favorite players.

== NFL ==
Casanova was drafted in the second round of the 1972 NFL draft with the 29th overall pick by the Cincinnati Bengals. After the draft, he received an offer from the Ottawa Rough Riders of the Canadian Football League, which he considered but he ultimately declined, and signed with the Bengals. Casanova played as a safety with the Bengals and also returned punts. As a rookie, he intercepted five passes on defense and had a 66-yard punt return for a touchdown. He was named the team MVP by his teammates after the season. In 1973, he had four interceptions, including two against the Pittsburgh Steelers in the seventh game of the season. He also had an interception in the Bengals' 34–16 divisional playoff loss to the Miami Dolphins.

Casanova was invited to his first Pro Bowl after the 1974 season. In 1975, Casanova moved from free safety to strong safety. His most productive year on defense was in 1976; he intercepted five passes and returned two of them for touchdowns and also returned a recovered fumble for a touchdown. He was invited to his second Pro Bowl and was recognized as a first-team All-Pro by the Associated Press. He had another Pro Bowl appearance in 1977 and retired after that season. Casanova compiled 17 interceptions in his career with the Bengals and scored three touchdowns on defense and one on a punt return.

== Later life and politics ==
While playing for the Bengals, Casanova began to pursue his M.D. at the University of Cincinnati College of Medicine. In 1977, he quit playing football early to pursue his medical degree full-time. He graduated from the UC College of Medicine in 1980, and then began a three-year residency in ophthalmology in New Orleans. After completing his residency in 1983, Casanova went on to complete a specialization in oculoplastic surgery at the University of Utah in Salt Lake City.

In the 1995 nonpartisan blanket primary in the historically Democratic District 26, formerly District 24, the Republican Casanova upset veteran Democratic state Senator Armand Brinkhaus. Casanova received 21,543 votes (58 percent) to Brinkhaus's 15,753 (42 percent). After a single term, Casanova declined to seek reelection and returned to his ophthalmology practice in Crowley. He was succeeded by the Democrat Fred Hoyt.

Political offices
Preceded by Armand Brinkhaus	Louisiana State Senator for the 26th District, including Acadia Parish; Thomas H. "Tommy" Casanova, III; 1996–2000	Succeeded by Fred Hoyt
