= Dave Roller =

American football player (born 1949)

No. 74, 76
- Position: Defensive tackle

Personal information
- Born: October 28, 1949 (age 77); Dayton, Tennessee, U.S.
- Listed height: 6 ft 2 in (1.88 m)
- Listed weight: 270 lb (122 kg)

Career information
- High school: Rhea County (Evensville, Tennessee)
- College: Kentucky
- NFL draft: 1971: 13th round, 330th overall pick

Career history
- New York Giants (1971); Southern California Sun (1974–1975); Green Bay Packers (1975–1978); Minnesota Vikings (1979–1980)

Awards and highlights
- 2× All-WFL (1974, 1975); 2× First-team All-SEC (1969, 1970); Second-team All-SEC (1968)

Career NFL statistics
- Sacks: 23.5
- Fumble recoveries: 5
- Stats at Pro Football Reference

David Euell Roller (born October 28, 1949) is an American former professional football player who was a defensive tackle in the National Football League (NFL). Prior to his professional career, Roller played college football for the Kentucky Wildcats, where he received multiple commendations for his athletic accomplishments, including induction into the Kentucky Athletic Hall of Fame. Roller was selected by the New York Giants in the 13th round of the 1971 NFL draft as the 330th overall pick. He played for the Giants for one season, before a brief stint playing in the World Football League. He returned to the NFL in 1975 with the Green Bay Packers, where he would go on to play for four seasons. He left Green Bay in 1979 to play for the Minnesota Vikings for two seasons before retiring from professional football. Altogether, Roller played in the NFL for seven seasons and appeared in 92 games.

== Early life ==
Dave Roller was born in Dayton, Tennessee, on October 28, 1949. He attended Rhea Central High School, where he was recognized as an All-American football player.

== College career ==
Roller attended the University of Kentucky, where he played on the defensive line for the Kentucky Wildcats football team. Roller was an accomplished member of the Wildcats defense from 1968 to 1970. In his sophomore season, he was named to the second-team All-SEC team. He was then named to the first-team All-SEC team for his junior and senior seasons. During his college career, he participated in multiple all-star games, including the All-American Bowl, the Hula Bowl, and North-South Shrine Game. In recognition of his contributions, the Lexington Herald-Leader included him in Kentucky's All-Time Team, he received the University of Kentucky's Unsung Hero Award, and he was inducted into Kentucky Athletic Hall of Fame. In 1986, he was also identified by writer Stan Torgerson as one of the best football players in the SEC in the previous 20 years.

== Professional career ==
Roller was drafted in the 13th round (330th overall pick) of the 1971 NFL draft by the New York Giants. He played 14 games for the Giants in the 1971 NFL season. He spent three years out of the NFL, during which he played for the Southern California Sun in the World Football League (WFL). He was an accomplished player in the WFL; both seasons he played for the Sun he was named to the WFL All-Star team. He was also named the defensive player of the year for one season and named to the WFL All-Time Team. In 1975 he was signed by the Green Bay Packers, where he played for four seasons. He was well known in Green Bay for his positive interactions with fans, often showing up early or staying late to sign autographs. After a game against the Detroit Lions, Roller, who weighed 270 pounds (120 kg) at the time, was even carried off the field by a number of fans, a rare event in the history of the Packers. Roller left the Packers for the Minnesota Vikings in 1978; he appeared in 30 games over two seasons with the team. During the last season of his career, he played in his first and only playoff game, a 31–16 loss to the Philadelphia Eagles. Roller retired from the NFL at the end of the 1980 NFL season.

== Personal life ==
Roller is married with three children and multiple grandchildren. After his football career, he became a sales representative for Lowe's in the Atlanta metropolitan area. Roller has faced various health issues since the conclusion of his professional football career. In response to these health issues, Roller has been part of at least four lawsuits against the NFL advocating for better financial and healthcare support for retired NFL players.
