= Dicky Lyons =

American football player (born 1947)

No. 48, 43, 10, 35
- Position: Defensive back

Personal information
- Born: August 11, 1947 (age 79); Louisville, Kentucky, U.S.
- Listed height: 6 ft 0 in (1.83 m)
- Listed weight: 191 lb (87 kg)

Career information
- High school: St. Xavier (Louisville)
- College: Kentucky (1965–1968)
- NFL draft: 1969: 4th round, 103rd overall pick

Career history
- Atlanta Falcons (1969)*; Richmond Roadrunners (1969); New Orleans Saints (1970); BC Lions (1971); Birmingham Americans (1974)
- * Offseason or practice squad member only

Awards and highlights
- 2× First-team All-SEC (1967, 1968); Second-team All-SEC (1966)

Career NFL statistics
- Games played: 4
- Interceptions: 1
- Stats at Pro Football Reference

Richard D. Lyons Sr. (born August 11, 1947) is an American former professional football player who was a defensive back for the New Orleans Saints of the National Football League (NFL), the BC Lions of the Canadian Football League (CFL), and the Birmingham Americans of the World Football League (WFL). He played college football for the Kentucky Wildcats.

== Early life ==
Richard D. Lyons was born on August 11, 1947, in Louisville, Kentucky. He attended St. Xavier High School in Louisville.

== College career ==
Lyons was a member of the Kentucky Wildcats football team from 1965 to 1968 as both a running back and defensive back. He was a three-year letterman from 1966 to 1968. He was named a second-team All-SEC defensive back by the Associated Press (AP) in 1966, a first-team All-SEC running back by United Press International (UPI) in 1967, and a first-team All-SEC running back by both the AP and UPI in 1968.

== Professional career ==
Lyons was selected by the Atlanta Falcons in the fourth round, with the 103rd overall pick, of the 1969 NFL/AFL draft. He was later released by the team.

He then played for the Richmond Roadrunners of the Atlantic Coast Football League during the 1969 season, returning 14 punts for 260 yards and two touchdowns.

Lyons signed with the New Orleans Saints in 1970. He played in four games, starting three, in 1970, recording one interception, five punt returns for 34 yards, and one kick return for 20 yards. He was released by the Saints in 1971.

Lyons played in three games for the BC Lions of the Canadian Football League in 1971 as a fullback, rushing 27 times for 122 yards. He also caught four passes for 13 yards.

Lyons played for the Birmingham Americans of the World Football League in 1974 and made three interceptions.

== Personal life ==
His son Dicky Lyons Jr. played for the Kentucky Wildcats from 2004 to 2008 and was an offseason member of the Denver Broncos in 2010.
