= Bob Asher (American football) =

American football player (born 1948)

No. 78, 74
- Positions: Offensive tackle, Guard

Personal information
- Born: June 13, 1948 (age 78); Arlington, Virginia, U.S.
- Listed height: 6 ft 5 in (1.96 m)
- Listed weight: 250 lb (113 kg)

Career information
- High school: Bishop Denis J. O'Connell (Arlington)
- College: Vanderbilt (1966-1969)
- NFL draft: 1970: 2nd round, 27th overall pick

Career history
- Dallas Cowboys (1970–1971); Chicago Bears (1972–1975)

Awards and highlights
- Super Bowl champion (VI); First-team All-American (1969); First-team All-SEC (1969); Second-team All-SEC (1968); All-South (1968)

Career NFL statistics
- Games played: 58
- Games started: 43
- Fumble recoveries: 1
- Stats at Pro Football Reference

Robert Dabney Asher (born June 13, 1948) is an American former professional football player who was an offensive tackle in the National Football League (NFL) for the Dallas Cowboys and Chicago Bears. He played college football for the Vanderbilt Commodores.

== Early life ==
Asher attended Bishop Denis J. O'Connell High School where he practiced basketball until his junior year, when he began playing football. He also practiced track and tennis.

He accepted a football scholarship from Vanderbilt University, where he started in every game during his three years of eligibility. As a junior, he was named All-South and second-team All-SEC.

As a senior, he received first-team All-SEC and second-team All-American honors. He also played in the Chicago College All-Star Game, the North–South Shrine Game, the Senior Bowl and the Canadian American Bowl.

== Professional career ==
=== Dallas Cowboys ===
During the 1970 NFL draft, the Dallas Cowboys traded cornerback Phil Clark and running back Craig Baynham to the Chicago Bears, in exchange for a second round draft choice (27th overall), that the team used to select Asher.

He injured his knee as a rookie and played in only 6 games. Doctors thought he could avoid surgery, but had to eventually perform the procedure in 1971, which would cost him a chance to start and play in Super Bowl VI. The team placed him on the injured reserve list and replaced him by signing future hall of famer Forrest Gregg.

On August 17, 1972, he was traded to the Chicago Bears along with defensive tackle Bill Line and a second round draft choice (#48-Gary Hrivnak), in exchange for quarterback Jack Concannon.

=== Chicago Bears ===
In 1972, he became the starter at right tackle. In 1975, he was passed over on the depth chart by Jeff Sevy. He retired in 1976, after suffering from knee and calf injuries.
