= Steve Tannen (American football) =

American football player (born 1948)

No. 21
- Position: Defensive back

Personal information
- Born: July 23, 1948 (age 78); Miami, Florida, U.S.
- Listed height: 6 ft 1 in (1.85 m)
- Listed weight: 194 lb (88 kg)

Career information
- High school: Southwest Miami
- College: Florida (1966-1969)
- NFL draft: 1970: 1st round, 20th overall pick

Career history
- New York Jets (1970–1974)

Awards and highlights
- First-team All-American (1969); First-team All-SEC (1968); Second-team All-SEC (1969); University of Florida Athletic Hall of Fame

Career NFL statistics
- Interceptions: 12
- Fumble recoveries: 2
- Sacks: 1
- Stats at Pro Football Reference

Steven Olson Tannen (born July 23, 1948) is an American former professional football player who was a defensive back in the National Football League (NFL) for five seasons during the early 1970s. Tannen played college football for the University of Florida, and was recognized as an All-American. He was a first-round pick in the 1970 NFL draft, and played his entire professional career for the New York Jets of the NFL.

== Early life ==
Tannen is Jewish, was born in Miami, Florida, and attended Southwest Miami High School. He was an outstanding track and field athlete in the Florida Relays as a senior in high school, competing in the high hurdles, pole vault, high jump and the 440 relay, as well as starring in high school football for the Southwest Miami Eagles. In 2007, 41 years after he graduated from high school, the Florida High School Athletic Association (FHSAA) recognized Tannen as one of the "100 Greatest Players of the First 100 Years" of Florida high school football.

== College career ==
Tannen accepted an athletic scholarship to attend the University of Florida in Gainesville, Florida, where he played defensive back for coach Ray Graves' Florida Gators football team from 1967 to 1969. He developed a reputation for tough play and being brash and cocky. Tannen was a first-team All-Southeastern Conference (SEC) selection in 1968, a first-team All-American in 1969, and the recipient of the Gators' Fergie Ferguson Award recognizing the "senior football player who displays outstanding leadership, character and courage." Memorably, Tannen blocked a punt in the 1969 Gator Bowl, which was returned for a touchdown and provided the Gators' margin of victory in their 14–13 upset win over the Tennessee Volunteers, and helped the Gators achieve their then best-ever record of 9–1–1. A versatile athlete, Tannen finished his three-season college career with 11 interceptions, and led the team in punt return yardage as a senior.

Tannen graduated from Florida with a bachelor's degree in business administration in 1972, and was later inducted into the University of Florida Athletic Hall of Fame as a "Gator Great." In 2006, the sportswriters of The Gainesville Sun chose him as No. 15 among the 100 greatest players from the first 100 years of Florida Gators football.

== Professional career ==
The New York Jets selected Tannen in the first round (20th pick overall) of the 1970 NFL draft, and he played for the Jets for five seasons from 1970 to 1974. As a rookie, he blocked a punt, recovered the ball and scored against Buffalo in 1970. A series of muscle pulls idled him in 1971. Shoulder injuries slowed him, but he managed to play in 13 of the games and led the team in interceptions with seven during the 1972 season. In 1973 he managed to start three games at free safety and spent the bulk of the season as backup man at either safety or at cornerback since he had experience at all positions. During his five-year NFL career, Tannen played in 64 games and had 12 interceptions with 204 return yards. He was also a standout special teamer, and blocked two field goals and a punt.

After retiring from the NFL in 1974, Tannen lived in California doing a variety jobs including acting, and then relocated to Gainesville, Florida in 2012.

== See also ==
- 1969 College Football All-America Team
- Florida Gators football, 1960–69
- List of Florida Gators in the NFL draft
- List of New York Jets first-round draft picks
- List of New York Jets players
- List of University of Florida alumni
- List of University of Florida Athletic Hall of Fame members
- List of select Jewish football players
