= Mike Kolen =

American football player (1948–2024)

No. 57
- Position: Linebacker

Personal information
- Born: January 31, 1948; Opelika, Alabama, U.S.
- Died: April 3, 2024 (aged 76)
- Listed height: 6 ft 2 in (1.88 m)
- Listed weight: 220 lb (100 kg)

Career information
- High school: W. A. Berry (Hoover, Alabama)
- College: Auburn
- NFL draft: 1970: 12th round, 289th overall pick

Career history
- Miami Dolphins (1970–1977)

Awards and highlights
- 2× Super Bowl champion (VII, VIII); Second-team All-American (1969); 2× First-team All-SEC (1968, 1969)
- Stats at Pro Football Reference

John Michael Kolen (January 31, 1948 – April 3, 2024) was an American professional football player who was a linebacker for eight seasons with the Miami Dolphins of the National Football League (NFL). Because of his hard-hitting style, he was nicknamed "Captain Crunch." He played for Berry High School in Hoover, Alabama, and collegiately for the Auburn Tigers.

== NFL history ==
Kolen was involved in one of the most famous plays in NFL history. On the December 21, 1974 playoff game between the Dolphins and the Oakland Raiders is The Sea of Hands game. With 35 seconds to play and the Dolphins leading 26–21, the Raiders had the ball 1st and Goal at the Miami 8-yard line. Quarterback Ken Stabler dropped back to pass and was flushed out of the pocket and nearly sacked by defensive end Vern Den Herder. As he went down, Stabler wristed a weak pass toward running back Clarence Davis in the end zone. Davis was surrounded by three Dolphins, including Kolen. Kolen got his hands on the ball and nearly knocked it away, but somehow Davis, amidst a "sea of hands," ended up with the ball and the touchdown, giving the Raiders the win and ending the Dolphins' dynasty.

== Personal life ==
Kolen lived in Birmingham, Alabama, with his wife Nancy. He had two children, Kelly and John, and five grandchildren. He owned Kolen Financial Team and worked with his son. He later released a book The Greatest Team: A Playbook for Champions.

Kolen died on April 3, 2024, at the age of 76.

== Publications ==
- Kolen, Mike (2015). The Greatest Team: A Playbook for Champions. William J. Cook Company. ISBN 9780990974437.
