= Bill Bridges (American football) =

American football player (born 1947)

Profile
- Position: Guard

Personal information
- Born: March 6, 1947 (age 79)
- Listed height: 6 ft 7 in (2.01 m)
- Listed weight: 234 lb (106 kg)

Career information
- College: Houston (1969)

Awards and highlights
- Consensus All-American (1969)

Bill Bridges (born March 6, 1947) is an American former football offensive guard who was a member of the 1969 College Football All-America Team while playing at the University of Houston. He was drafted in the 9th round, 213th overall, in the 1970 NFL draft by the Buffalo Bills, but never played in a National Football League regular season game.
