= Chip Kell =

American football player (1949–2024)

Profile
- Positions: Center, guard

Personal information
- Born: March 10, 1949; Atlanta, Georgia, U.S.
- Died: May 25, 2024 (aged 75); Dalton, Georgia, U.S.
- Listed height: 6 ft 0 in (1.83 m)
- Listed weight: 240 lb (109 kg)

Career information
- College: Tennessee
- NFL draft: 1971: 17th round, 429th overall pick

Career history
- 1971–1972: Edmonton Eskimos

Awards and highlights
- Unanimous All-American (1970); Consensus All-American (1969); 2× Jacobs Blocking Trophy (1969, 1970); 3× First-team All-SEC (1968, 1969, 1970); Tennessee Sports Hall of Fame
- College Football Hall of Fame (Class of 2006)

Curtis Cliff "Chip" Kell (March 10, 1949 – May 25, 2024) was an American professional football player who was a center in the Canadian Football League (CFL). He played college football and participated in track and field for the Tennessee Volunteers. Kell was elected to the College Football Hall of Fame in 2006.

== High school ==
Kell attended Avondale High School. In 1966, Kell set the Georgia All Classifications record for Avondale High School in the shot put, at a distance of 66' 7", which is a record that stood for 50 years until broken in 2016 by Isaiah Rogers of Campbell High School.

== College career ==
Kell was a three-time All-SEC and two-time consensus All-American performer at the University of Tennessee. He helped lead the Volunteers to an SEC Championship in 1969. During Kell's time in Knoxville, Tennessee was undefeated at Shields–Watkins Field. In 2006, Kell was inducted into the College Football Hall of Fame, making him the 20th Tennessee player to be inducted. Kell also won three SEC titles in the shot put for Tennessee.

== Professional career ==
Kell was drafted in the 17th round of the 1971 NFL draft by the San Diego Chargers with the 429th overall pick. He played for the Edmonton Eskimos of the CFL in 1971 and 1972.

== Death ==
Kell died from pneumonia in Dalton, Georgia, on May 25, 2024, at the age of 75.
