= 1970 All-SEC football team =

American college football all-star team

The 1970 All-SEC football team consists of American football players selected to the All-Southeastern Conference (SEC) chosen by various selectors for the 1970 NCAA University Division football season. LSU won the conference.

== Offensive selections ==
=== Receivers ===
- Terry Beasley, Auburn (AP-1, UPI)
- David Smith, Miss. St. (AP-1, UPI)
- David Bailey, Alabama (AP-2)
- Floyd Franks, Ole Miss (AP-2)

=== Tight ends ===
- Jim Poole, Ole Miss (AP-2, UPI)
- Jim Yancey, Florida (AP-1)

=== Tackles ===
- Worthy McClure, Ole Miss (AP-1, UPI)
- Royce Smith, Georgia (AP-1)
- Tom Nash, Georgia (UPI)
- John Hannah, Alabama (AP-2)
- Danny Speigner, Auburn (AP-2)

=== Guards ===
- Chip Kell, Tennessee (College Football Hall of Fame) (AP-1, UPI)
- Skip Jernigan, Ole Miss (AP-1, UPI)
- Mike Demarie, LSU (AP-2)
- Jimmy Speigner, Auburn (AP-2)

=== Centers ===
- Tommy Lyons, Georgia (AP-2, UPI)
- Mike Bevans, Tennessee (AP-1)

=== Quarterbacks ===
- Pat Sullivan, Auburn (College Football Hall of Fame) (AP-1, UPI)
- Archie Manning, Ole Miss (College Football Hall of Fame) (AP-2, UPI)

=== Running backs ===
- Johnny Musso, Alabama (AP-1, UPI)
- Curt Watson, Tennessee (AP-1, UPI)
- Art Cantrelle, LSU (AP-2)
- Randy Reed, Ole Miss (AP-2)

== Defensive selections ==
=== Ends ===
- Jack Youngblood, Florida (College Football Hall of Fame) (AP-1, UPI)
- Dennis Coleman, Ole Miss (AP-1, UPI)
- Dave Hardt, Kentucky (AP-2)
- Chuck Heard, Georgia (AP-2)

=== Tackles ===
- John Sage, LSU (AP-1, UPI)
- Dave Roller, Kentucky (AP-1, UPI)
- Ron Estay, LSU (AP-2)
- Larry Brasher, Georgia (AP-2)

=== Linebackers ===
- Mike Anderson, LSU (AP-1, UPI)
- Jackie Walker, Tennessee (AP-1, UPI)
- Bobby Strickland, Auburn (AP-1, UPI)
- Chip Wisdom, Georgia (AP-2)
- Fred Brister, Ole Miss (AP-2)
- Chuck Dees, Miss. St.(AP-2)

=== Backs ===
- Tommy Casanova, LSU (College Football Hall of Fame) (AP-1, UPI)
- Bobby Majors, Tennessee (AP-1, UPI)
- Larry Willingham, Auburn (AP-1, UPI)
- Tim Priest, Tennessee (AP-2, UPI)
- Buzy Rosenberg, Georgia (AP-1)
- Craig Burns, LSU (AP-2)
- Ray Heidel, Ole Miss (AP-2)
- Ken Phares, Miss. St. (AP-2)

== Special teams ==
=== Kicker ===
- Gardner Jett, Auburn (AP-1)
- Kim Braswell, Georgia (AP-2)

=== Punter ===
- Steve Smith, Vanderbilt (AP-1)
- Frank Mann, Alabama (AP-2)

== Key ==
AP = Associated Press

UPI = United Press International

Bold = Consensus first-team selection by both AP and UPI

== See also ==
- 1970 College Football All-America Team
