= Tommy Lyons (American football) =

American football player (born 1948)

No. 61
- Positions: Guard, center

Personal information
- Born: August 7, 1948 (age 78); Atlanta, Georgia, U.S.
- Listed height: 6 ft 2 in (1.88 m)
- Listed weight: 230 lb (104 kg)

Career information
- High school: Georgia Military Academy (College Park, Georgia)
- College: Georgia
- NFL draft: 1971: 14th round, 350th overall pick

Career history
- Denver Broncos (1971–1976)

Awards and highlights
- Second-team All-American (1970); First-team All-SEC (1970)

Career NFL statistics
- Games played: 73
- Games started: 62
- Fumble recoveries: 2
- Stats at Pro Football Reference

Thomas Lewis Lyons (born August 7, 1948) is an American former professional football player who was an offensive lineman for the Denver Broncos of the National Football League (NFL). He played college football for the Georgia Bulldogs.

== Football career ==
He graduated Georgia Military Academy (now Woodward) and then from the University of Georgia in 1971. He earned both his bachelor's and master's degrees in clinical bio-psychology from the University of Georgia. He was selected 14th round of the 1971 NFL draft. Lyons played for the Broncos for six seasons, starting in 43 consecutive games at one point during his career.

== Medical career ==
After his time in the NFL, Lyons went to University of Colorado Medical School, graduating with a medical degree in 1977. He practices medicine in Atlanta. He is the Director of the Center for Women's Care and Reproductive Surgery in Atlanta. He is director of Gynecologic surgery, Chief of Surgery of Advanced Surgery Center of Atlanta. He is also a Clinical Assistant Professor at the department of OB/GYN at Emory University School of Medicine. He has written over 19 chapters for medical publications and has written 30 publications.

== Awards ==
Lyons received a Silver Anniversary Award from the National Collegiate Athletic Association in 1996.

In 2002, he was the recipient of the Bill Hartman Award recognizing his excellence in his profession and/or service to others.

Dr. Lyons was one of 16 graduates from the University of Georgia Graduate School who received the 2013 Alumni of Distinction Award. The award is given to recognize alumni who achieve exceptional success in their professional careers and in service to their community.
