= Richmond Flowers Jr. =

American football player (born 1947)

Richmond Flowers
No. 45, 44
- Positions: Safety, Wide receiver

Personal information
- Born: June 13, 1947 (age 79); Dothan, Alabama, U.S.
- Listed height: 6 ft 0 in (1.83 m)
- Listed weight: 180 lb (82 kg)

Career information
- High school: Montgomery (AL) Sidney Lanier
- College: Tennessee
- NFL draft: 1969: 2nd round, 49th overall pick

Career history
- Dallas Cowboys (1969–1971); New York Giants (1971–1973); Houston Texans/Shreveport Steamer (1974–1975)

Awards and highlights
- Super Bowl champion (VI); All-American (1967); All-SEC sophomore team (1966); 2× Second-team All-SEC (1967, 1968); 3× Track All-American (1966, 1967, 1968)

Career NFL statistics
- Interceptions: 6
- Fumble recoveries: 4
- Stats at Pro Football Reference

Richmond McDavid Flowers Jr. (born June 13, 1947) is an American former professional football player who was a safety in the National Football League (NFL) for the Dallas Cowboys and New York Giants. He played college football for the Tennessee Volunteers and was selected in the second round of the 1969 NFL/AFL draft. He was also a track All-American in college.

Flowers participated in track and field primarily as a hurdler, specializing in the 110-meter high hurdles. After capturing the NCAA championship in the event in 1968, he was a leading contender to win the gold medal at the 1968 Summer Olympics before suffering a hamstring injury just prior to the Olympic trials. He set several records during his career.

He was the son of Richmond Flowers Sr., an anti-segregationist who served a tumultuous term as Alabama's attorney general in the 1960s.

== Early life ==
Flowers was raised in Dothan, a city located in Houston County in southeastern Alabama. During his early childhood, he appeared to be anything but a future athlete. He suffered from asthma, anemia, and dyslexia, and frequently missed school due to illness. He was also flat-footed, and had to wear heavy orthopedic Brogans. By the time he was in junior high, however, his asthma had cleared up, and his feet began to arch. In the Fall of 1962, Flowers' family moved to Montgomery, where he attended Sidney Lanier High School.

His father was Richmond Flowers Sr., the Attorney General of Alabama from 1963 to 1967 and a former member of the Alabama State Senate. The senior Flowers was an intraparty rival of segregationist Governors George Wallace and Lurleen Burns Wallace. He drew national attention in the early 1960s when he criticized Wallace's "Stand in the Schoolhouse Door" incident, which was an attempt to bar African Americans from enrolling in the University of Alabama. He also favored the integration of public schools and prosecuted Ku Klux Klansmen in the killings of civil rights workers. His work against the era's conventions made him and his family a target of scorn, hate and death threats. The family received threatening phone calls at all hours of the night, their house was frequently vandalized, and a cross was burned on their lawn.

Amid the chaos surrounding his father, the younger Flowers exploded onto the track and field scene. In the Spring of 1963, he set state high school records in the 120-yard high hurdles, the 180-yard high hurdles, and the long jump. In 1964, he broke five state records at the state high school championships. As a senior in 1965, he set regional records in the 120-yard high hurdles, the 180-yard low hurdles and the long jump. He tied the state record in the 100-yard dash and anchored the winning 4 × 100 metres relay team. At the Gulf Coast Relays in Mobile, he set a national high school record with 13.5 seconds in the 120-yard high hurdles. At an open meet in Modesto, California, in May 1965, he beat 1964 Olympic silver medalist Blaine Lindgren in the 42-inch hurdles.

Flowers received scholarship offers from more than 100 colleges, and was heavily recruited by Alabama head coach Bear Bryant. He was intrigued, however, by the University of Tennessee, where Coach Chuck Rohe was gradually building the track program into a national powerhouse. He made up his mind to attend Tennessee in 1965 following the Gulf Coast Relays, during which his father had been introduced and booed.

== College career ==
At Tennessee, Flowers was a three-time NCAA All-American in track. At the All-Eastern Games in Baltimore in February 1966, Flowers registered a time of 6.9 seconds in the 60-yard high hurdles, just one-tenth of a second off the world record. At the National AAU meet in the Spring of that year, he finished second to future Olympian Willie Davenport in the hurdles, and second to Billy Gaines in the 60-yard dash. He was the cover photo on the March 14, 1966 issue of Sports Illustrated. At the SEC Championships in May 1967, he won the 120-yard high hurdles and the 100-yard dash, and was named Most Outstanding Performer. At the NCAA Championships the following month, he set the NCAA record in the 120-yard high hurdles.He was the 1968 NCAA Indoor Champion for 60 yard hurdles.

Along with track, Flowers joined Tennessee's football team, which Coach Doug Dickey had been rebuilding into a national contender. Starting at wingback during his sophomore year in 1966 (freshmen were ineligible to play varsity before the 1970s), Flowers caught 35 passes for 405 yards, and was named to the sophomore All-SEC team. He registered five catches for 80 yards and a touchdown in Tennessee's 18-12 win over the Larry Csonka-led Syracuse Orange in the 1966 Gator Bowl. During his junior season in 1967, he caught 41 passes for 585 yards and four touchdowns, and was named an All-American by The Football News.

By his junior year in 1968, Flowers was considered a leading contender for the 1968 Summer Olympics in the 110 metres hurdles. Davenport had dominated the previous three seasons, but in 1968, Flowers beat him handily at several early season meets, to the point that the future gold medalist quit his college team that he thought was hurting his chances. Flowers ran the high hurdles in 13.3 seconds, a tenth of a second off the world mark, and went on to win eight consecutive hurdles races, which included wins over Davenport, Ervin Hall, and world-record holder Earl McCullouch. While training at UT on June 2, however, he tore his right hamstring. He showed up at the September high altitude Olympic Trials in Echo Summit just barely recovered, but struggled to a non-qualifying 5th place.

His Olympic ambitions in shambles, Flowers rejoined Tennessee's football team in time for the 1968 season. Lining up primarily at halfback, he carried 20 times for 101 yards in Tennessee's 24-7 win over Georgia Tech, scored two touchdowns in Tennessee's 42-18 win over UCLA, and most notably scored Tennessee's lone touchdown in the Vols' 10-9 victory over Alabama. He finished his football career at UT with a then-school record 101 catches for 1,172 yards and nine touchdowns, 140 rushes for 481 yards and seven touchdowns, and 19 kick returns for 411 yards.

== Professional career ==
=== Dallas Cowboys ===
Flowers was selected by the Dallas Cowboys in the second round (49th overall) of the 1969 NFL/AFL draft. He was chosen as an athlete, so he spent his first weeks in training camp on both offense and defense, before focusing on safety. In his first year, he was mostly used on kickoff returns (21.6 yards average), before being placed on the taxi squad to make room on the roster for an injured Bob Hayes.

In 1970, he was beat out for the free safety position by the undrafted rookie Cliff Harris. After Harris was forced to leave the team because of military service obligations, he received the opportunity to start two games, but was eventually replaced in the starting lineup by Charlie Waters. His most important play as a Cowboy came against the Cleveland Browns, when the Browns had to punt while backed up against their end zone, he replaced an injured D. D. Lewis and blocked the punt that led to a game-winning field goal, for a final score of 6-2. In 1971, he returned to a reserve role and was waived on October 25, one day after the Cowboys defeated the New England Patriots in the first game at Texas Stadium.

=== New York Giants ===
On October 25, 1971, the Washington Redskins claimed him off the waiver wire, but ended up sending him to the New York Giants on October 27, to complete the trade for Clifton McNeil. As part of the transaction, the Giants originally received a fifth (#121-Larry Edwards), sixth, and seventh round (#177-Mike Zikas) draft choices, before accepting Flowers and returning the sixth choice back.

In 1972, he was named the starter at strong safety and had his best season in the NFL, recording 4 interceptions. In 1973, he was injured in the second game of the season and missed six games before being activated on November 10.

While playing for the Giants he also was a part of the International Track Association, where he was contacted by the founders of the World Football League.

=== Houston Texans/Shreveport Steamer ===
In 1974, Flowers signed with the Hawaiians of the World Football League, becoming the first NFL player to sign with the new league. His rights were later sent to the Houston Texans, where he worked in the team's front office, while his Giants contract ran out and he could return to play. On September 23, the team relocated to Shreveport, Louisiana and changed their name to the Shreveport Steamer.

== Personal life ==
Described by the 1967 Tennessee football media guide as the "aspiring J.P. Morgan of the squad" for his habit of analyzing stocks while the team was en route to away games, Flowers collected a business degree from Tennessee. After his professional football career, he obtained a Juris Doctor from the University of Alabama School of Law, and briefly practiced law in Nashville. In the early 1980s, he became Vice President of REFCO, a Chicago-based commodities trading firm. In 1983, Flowers lost millions of dollars on a bad investment, and was censured and fined by the Commodity Futures Trading Commission. He relocated to Coral Gables, Florida, where he began to rebuild his life. Following Hurricane Andrew in 1992, Flowers moved to Birmingham. He has worked as a salesman for NuSkin International since 1989.

Flowers was named a "Living Legend" for SEC football in 1998, and was listed among the twenty-five greatest SEC athletes by The Birmingham News. He was named to the Alabama Sports Hall of Fame in 2002, and the Tennessee Sports Hall of Fame in 2005. Flowers and his father were the subjects of the 1989 CBS television film, Unconquered, starring Dermot Mulroney as Flowers and Peter Coyote as his father.

Flowers' son, Richmond Flowers III, was a state champion hurdler in high school and was a member of the Dallas Cowboys and Washington Redskins practice squads in the early 2000s. He is currently an offensive assistant in the NFL.
