= Godfrey Zaunbrecher =

American football player (born 1946)

No. 51
- Position: Center

Personal information
- Born: December 17, 1946; Crowley, Louisiana, U.S.
- Died: September 19, 2023 (aged 76); Los Banos, California, U.S.
- Listed height: 6 ft 2 in (1.88 m)
- Listed weight: 240 lb (109 kg)

Career information
- High school: St. Michael's (Crowley)
- College: LSU (1966–1969)
- NFL draft: 1970: 11th round, 286th overall pick

Career history
- Minnesota Vikings (1970–1973)

Awards and highlights
- First-team All-SEC (1969); Second-team All-SEC (1968)

Career NFL statistics
- Games played: 16
- Stats at Pro Football Reference

Godfrey William Zaunbrecher (December 17, 1946 – September 19, 2023) was an American professional football center who played three seasons with the Minnesota Vikings of the National Football League (NFL). He was selected by the Vikings in the eleventh round of the 1970 NFL draft after playing college football at Louisiana State University.

== Early life and college ==
Godfrey William Zaunbrecher was born on December 17, 1946, in Crowley, Louisiana. He attended St. Michael's High School in Crowley.

Zaunbrecher played college football for the LSU Tigers of Louisiana State University. He was on the freshman team in 1966 and was a three-year letterman from 1967 to 1969. He started his final two seasons, earning second-team All-SEC honors in 1968 and first-team All-SEC accolades in 1969. He was also named to the East–West Shrine Game his junior year and the Senior Bowl his senior season.

== Professional career ==
Zaunbrecher was selected by the Minnesota Vikings in the 11th round, with the 286th overall pick, of the 1970 NFL draft. He signed with the team on May 12. He was released on September 9, 1970, but then signed to the Vikings' taxi squad, where he spent the entire 1970 season. Zaunbrecher re-signed with the Vikings in 1971 but was later released and signed to the taxi squad on September 8, 1971. He was promoted to the active roster on October 15, 1971, and played in four games during the 1971 season. He also appeared in one playoff game that year. Zaunbrecher played in seven games in 1972 and five games in 1973. He was released by the Vikings on September 10, 1974.

== Personal life ==
Zaunbrecher died on September 19, 2023, in Los Banos, California.
