= List of New York Jets first-round draft picks =

List of American football players

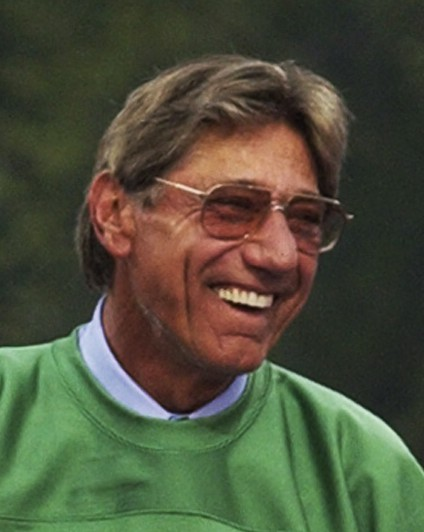
Joe Namath, the Jets' selection in the first round of the 1965 AFL draft

The New York Jets, originally known as the Titans of New York from the team's conception in 1960 until 1962, joined the NFL as part of the 1970 AFL–NFL merger, two years after defeating the Baltimore Colts 16–7 in Super Bowl III.

The Titans made their first American Football League draft selection in 1961. They chose Tom Brown, a defensive lineman/guard from the University of Minnesota, known as the "Rock of Gibraltar", who won the 1960 Outland Trophy as the nation's best lineman and finished 2nd in the Heisman Trophy voting. Brown later became a College Football Hall of Famer and Canadian Football Hall of Famer.

In 1970, the Jets selected Steve Tannen, a defensive back from the University of Florida, as their first pick in the NFL Draft. In the most recent draft in 2026, the team has selected Texas Tech linebacker David Bailey, Oregon tight end Kenyon Sadiq, and Indiana wide receiver Omar Cooper.

Every year during April, each NFL franchise seeks to add new players to its roster through a collegiate draft known as "the NFL Annual Player Selection Meeting", which is more commonly known as the NFL draft. Teams are ranked in inverse order based on the previous season's record, with the worst record picking first, and the second worst picking second and so on. The two exceptions to this order are made for teams that appeared in the previous Super Bowl; the Super Bowl champion always picks 32nd, and the Super Bowl loser always picks 31st. Teams have the option of trading away their picks to other teams for different picks, players, cash, or a combination thereof. Thus, it is not uncommon for a team's actual draft pick to differ from their assigned draft pick, or for a team to have extra or no draft picks in any round due to these trades.

The Jets have selected the number one overall pick one time: Keyshawn Johnson, a wide receiver from the University of Southern California in the 1996 NFL draft. The team has also selected number two overall four times and number three overall three times. The Jets have selected players from the University of Southern California and the Ohio State University each seven times, and five times from the University of Alabama. Three eventual Hall of Famers were selected by the Jets: Joe Namath John Riggins, and Darrelle Revis

== Key ==
RB	Running back	FB	Fullback
HB	Halfback	QB	Quarterback
DE	Defensive end	C	Center
LB	Linebacker	T or OT	Offensive tackle
TE	Tight end	G or OG	Offensive guard
WR	Wide receiver	DT	Defensive tackle
S	Safety	CB	Cornerback
DB	Defensive back		

== Player selections ==
Selected number one overall	Enshrined in the Pro Football Hall of Fame

New York Jets first-round draft picks
Year	Pick	Player name	Position	College	Yrs NFL/AFL	Yrs w Jets	Notes
American Football League (1961–1962) as Titans
1960	Territorial	George Izo	QB	Notre Dame	0	0	
1961	--	Tom Brown	DL/G	Minnesota	0	0	
1962	--	Sandy Stephens	QB	Minnesota	0	0	
American Football League (1963–1969) as Jets
1963	--	Jerry Stovall	HB	LSU	9	0	
1964	--	Matt Snell	FB	Ohio State	9	9	
1965	--	Joe Namath	QB	Alabama	13	12	
1965	--	Tom Nowatzke	FB	Indiana	8	0	
1966	--	Bill Yearby	T	Michigan	1	1	
1967	12	Paul Seiler	C/G	Notre Dame	5	2	
1968	17	Lee White	FB	Weber State	5	3	
1969	26	Dave Foley	T	Ohio State	9	3	
National Football League, modern era (1970–present)
1970	20	Steve Tannen	DB	Florida	5	5	
1971	6	John Riggins	RB	Kansas	14	5	
1972	9	Jerome Barkum	WR/TE	Jackson State	12	12	
1972	20	Mike Taylor	LB	Michigan	2	2	
1973	13	Burgess Owens	CB/S	Miami (FL)	10	7	
1974	6	Carl Barzilauskas	DT	Indiana	6	4	
1975	No draft pick						
1976	6	Richard Todd	QB	Alabama	10	8	
1977	4	Marvin Powell	T	USC	11	9	
1978	4	Chris Ward	T	Ohio State	7	6	
1979	14	Marty Lyons	DE/DT	Alabama	11	11	
1980	2	Johnny "Lam" Jones	WR	Texas	5	5	
1981	3	Freeman McNeil	RB	UCLA	12	12	
1982	23	Bob Crable	LB	Notre Dame	6	6	
1983	24	Ken O'Brien	QB	UC Davis	10	9	
1984	10	Russell Carter	CB/S	SMU	6	4	
1984	15	Ron Faurot	DE/DT	Arkansas	2	2	
1985	10	Al Toon	WR	Wisconsin	8	8	
1986	22	Mike Haight	T/G	Iowa	7	6	
1987	21	Roger Vick	FB	Texas A&M	3	1	
1988	8	Dave Cadigan	T/G	USC	6	5	
1989	14	Jeff Lageman	LB	Virginia	10	6	
1990	2	Blair Thomas	RB	Penn State	6	4	
1991	No draft pick						
1992	15	Johnny Mitchell	TE	Nebraska	6	4	
1993	4	Marvin Jones	LB	Florida State	10	10	
1994	12	Aaron Glenn	CB	Texas A&M	14	8	
1995	9	Kyle Brady	TE	Penn State	13	8	
1995	16	Hugh Douglas	DE	Central State	10	3	
1996	1	Keyshawn Johnson	WR	USC	11	4	
1997	8	James Farrior	LB	Virginia	14	5	
1998	No draft pick						
1999	No draft pick						
2000	12	Shaun Ellis	DE	Tennessee	11	10	
2000	13	John Abraham	LB	South Carolina	15	6	
2000	18	Chad Pennington	QB	Marshall	11	8	
2000	27	Anthony Becht	TE	West Virginia	10	5	
2001	16	Santana Moss	WR	Miami (FL)	14	4	
2002	22	Bryan Thomas	DE	UAB	11	11	
2003	4	Dewayne Robertson	DT	Kentucky	6	5	
2004	12	Jonathan Vilma	LB	Miami (FL)	10	3	
2005	No draft pick						
2006	4	D'Brickashaw Ferguson	T	Virginia	10	10	
2006	29	Nick Mangold	C	Ohio State	11	11	
2007	14	Darrelle Revis	CB	Pittsburgh	10	8	
2008	6	Vernon Gholston	DE	Ohio State	5	2	
2008	30	Dustin Keller	TE	Purdue	5	5	
2009	5	Mark Sanchez	QB	USC	8	4	
2010	29	Kyle Wilson	CB	Boise State	6	5	
2011	30	Muhammad Wilkerson	DL	Temple	8	7	
2012	16	Quinton Coples	DE	North Carolina	4	4	
2013	9	Dee Milliner	CB	Alabama	3	3	
2013	13	Sheldon Richardson	DT	Missouri	10*	4	
2014	18	Calvin Pryor	S	Louisville	4	3	
2015	6	Leonard Williams	DT	USC	9*	5	
2016	20	Darron Lee	LB	Ohio State	6*	3	
2017	6	Jamal Adams	S	LSU	7*	3	
2018	3	Sam Darnold	QB	USC	6*	3	
2019	3	Quinnen Williams	DT	Alabama	5*	5*	
2020	11	Mekhi Becton	T	Louisville	4*	4*	
2021	2	Zach Wilson	QB	BYU	3*	3*	
2021	14	Alijah Vera-Tucker	G	USC	3*	3*	
2022	4	Sauce Gardner	CB	Cincinnati	2*	2	
2022	10	Garrett Wilson	WR	Ohio State	2*	2*	
2022	26	Jermaine Johnson	DE	Florida State	2*	2*	
2023	15	Will McDonald IV	DE	Iowa State	1*	1*	
2024	11	Olumuyiwa Fashanu	T	Penn State	0*	0*	
2025	7	Armand Membou	T	Missouri	0*	0*	
2026	2	David Bailey	LB	Texas Tech	0*	0*	
2026	16	Kenyon Sadiq	TE	Oregon	0*	0*	
2026	30	Omar Cooper Jr.	WR	Indiana	0*	0*	

Asterisks after active season numbers denote that the player is still active. Asterisks after seasons with Jets numbers denote player is still with the Jets.
