= John Ward (broadcaster) =

American sportscaster (1930–2018)

John H Ward (April 22, 1930 – June 20, 2018) was an American sportscaster, best known as the radio play-by-play broadcaster for the University of Tennessee (UT), primarily from 1965 until 1999, and known to fans as the "Voice of the Vols".

== Background ==
Ward grew up in South Knoxville. His father, Herschel, was principal at the Tennessee School for the Deaf, and interpreted radio broadcasts of Vols football games for students. John later described his father as "a great communicator, much better than I ever was." John graduated from Knoxville High School in 1948, and graduated from University of Tennessee-Knoxville with a degree in Political Science in 1952.

He earned a law degree in 1954 at the University of Tennessee College of Law. Rather than practicing law, he decided to go into radio and advertising. Ward's first broadcast of a university basketball game for the Vol Network came in 1958. (Under the leadership of football coach Robert Neyland, sports broadcasting rights had been taken in-house.)

Shortly thereafter, Ward joined the army.

After returning to Knoxville, Ward went to work at the Lavidge and Davis advertising agency. In 1964 he began handling the duties as announcer-host-coordinator for University of Tennessee coaches' television shows in football and basketball. His broadcasting career blossomed when he became the Vols' radio play-by-play voice, first, for basketball in 1965 and three years later for football (1968). The first Tennessee football game for John was scheduled on September 14, 1968, with Tennessee against Georgia in Knoxville where the game ended in a tie 17–17. The season was successful for coach Doug Dickey (8–2–1) but Tennessee lost in the January 1, 1969, Cotton Bowl 36–13 to Texas.

Ward was a brother of the Lambda chapter of Kappa Sigma at the University of Tennessee.

== Career ==
In addition to his duties with the Vol Network, Ward covered events for ABC-TV and ESPN. For his entire tenure as the voice of Vol football, his color commentator was former Vols tight end Bill Anderson. They were the longest-running broadcasting partnership in college football at the time.

For most of his tenure as the Vols' radio voice, he could be heard across much of the eastern half of North America on Nashville's WLAC, a 50,000-watt clear-channel station.

Among Ward's trademark calls:

- "It's football time in Tennessee!": How he began each broadcast of a Volunteer football game. During home games at Neyland Stadium, Ward usually timed himself to say it as the Vols run through the "Power T."
- "Give ... him ... SIX! TOUCHDOWN TENNESSEE!": His normal touchdown call. He often prefaced this by counting runners toward the goal line with "Four, three, two, one..."
- "Did he make it? HE MADE IT!": After a made field goal
- "BOTTOM!": After a made basket in basketball.
- "Shot it...Got it": After a made free throw in basketball.

After the 1998–99 football and basketball seasons, in which the Volunteers won the National Championship in football, Ward and Anderson retired, and were replaced by Bob Kesling and Tim Priest, respectively. In his final season as "Voice of the Vols," UT named the fourth level of the East Skybox at Neyland Stadium "The John Ward Broadcast Center." Ward's final football broadcast was the 1999 Fiesta Bowl, the first BCS national championship. Tennessee defeated Florida State to win its second undisputed national championship.

Earlier in that season, Ward called Tennessee's last-second victory over Florida, in which a missed Gator field goal gave the Vols their first win over the Gators in eight years.

Snap, the kick is in the air. And the kick this time is ... NO, SIR-REE! NO, SIR-REE! Final score, Tennessee 20, Florida 17! Pandemonium reigns!

His final basketball broadcast for the Vols came in the second round of the 1999 NCAA men's tournament, with Tennessee's loss to Southwest Missouri State University on March 21.

In later years, Ward still did some commercial radio advertisements and public service announcements heard statewide.

The John Ward Broadcast Center in Ward's honor in 1995. Ward is a member of the Tennessee Sports Hall of Fame.

In 1998, Kenny Chesney recorded a promotional single in tribute of Ward's retirement that same year, titled "Touchdown Tennessee".

== Personal life ==
John Ward married Barbara Mae Tallent on Saturday, December 23, 1961, at the First Christian Church in Knoxville, Tennessee. (The Knoxville Journal (Knoxville, Tennessee)25 Dec 1961, Page 6). John and Barbara never had children. In 1994, they donated an estimated $2 million to the UT athletics department. Barbara died July 20, 2017, following a traffic accident.

== Death ==
Ward died on June 20, 2018, at the age of 88.
