= Joe Federspiel =

American football player (born 1950)

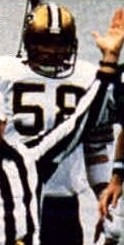
- Federspiel playing for the Saints in 1977

No. 58, 50
- Position: Linebacker

Personal information
- Born: May 6, 1950 (age 76); Louisville, Kentucky, U.S.
- Listed height: 6 ft 1 in (1.85 m)
- Listed weight: 230 lb (104 kg)

Career information
- High school: DeSales (KY)
- College: Kentucky
- NFL draft: 1972: 4th round, 99th overall pick

Career history
- New Orleans Saints (1972–1980); Baltimore Colts (1981)

Awards and highlights
- Second-team All-American (1971); First-team All-SEC (1971); Second-team All-SEC (1969); New Orleans Saints Hall of Fame

Career NFL statistics
- Sacks: 7.5
- Fumble recoveries: 10
- Interceptions: 5
- Stats at Pro Football Reference

Joseph Michael Federspiel (born May 6, 1950) is an American former professional football player who was a linebacker for 10 seasons in the National Football League (NFL). Federspiel played college football for the Kentucky Wildcats.

Federspiel played in the NFL for the New Orleans Saints (1972–1980) and Baltimore Colts in 1981. Federspiel also played for the Chicago Blitz of the United States Football League in 1983.

After retiring as a player, Federspiel officiated Southeastern Conference (SEC) football games as an umpire. He was not allowed to work Kentucky games, as SEC rules prohibit officials from calling games involving their alma mater.
