= George Bevan =

American football player (born 1947)

Profile
- Position: Linebacker

Personal information
- Born: September 11, 1947 (age 79); Baton Rouge, Louisiana, U.S.
- Listed height: 5 ft 11 in (1.80 m)
- Listed weight: 195 lb (88 kg)

Career information
- College: LSU (1967–1969)

Awards and highlights
- First-team All-American (1969); 2× First-team All-SEC (1966, 1969)

George Bevan (born September 11, 1947) is a former college American football player for the LSU Tigers football team. He played as a linebacker from 1967 to 1969, although he missed the majority of his first two seasons after rupturing an Achilles tendon in the 1967 season opener. As a senior in 1969, he was named a first-team All-American by the American Football Coaches Association and Football Writers Association of America. He was a second-team selection by the Associated Press, Central Press, and Newspaper Enterprise Association. The Associated Press and United Press International each named Bevan a first-team All-Southeastern Conference linebacker.

Bevan was selected in the seventeenth round of the 1970 NFL draft by the Buffalo Bills, but he did not play professionally.
