= Mike Anderson (linebacker) =

American football player (born 1949)

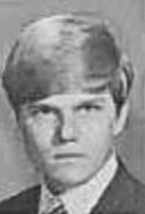
- Anderson from 1971 LSU yearbook

Profile
- Position: Linebacker

Personal information
- Born: February 6, 1949 (age 77); Baton Rouge, Louisiana, U.S.

Career information
- High school: Baton Rouge (LA) Robert E. Lee
- College: LSU (1968–1970)

Awards and highlights
- Consensus All-American (1970); First-team All-SEC (1970); Second-team All-SEC (1968)

Michael Howard Anderson (born February 6, 1949) is an American former football player.

== Playing career ==
Anderson graduated from Robert E. Lee High School in Baton Rouge, Louisiana, in 1967 and then attended Louisiana State University in the same city. He played college football for the LSU Tigers from 1967 to 1970 and was a consensus All-American linebacker in 1970.

== Post-playing career ==
Anderson later operated restaurants in Baton Rouge and New Orleans called Mike Anderson's Seafood. In 2014, he sued the NCAA and Riddell Inc., a helmet manufacturer, seeking compensation for head injuries he sustained while playing college football. He alleged that the defendants failed to protect players from, or to inform them adequately about, brain injuries.
