= 1968 All-SEC football team =

American college football all-star team

The 1968 All-SEC football team consists of American football players selected to the All-Southeastern Conference (SEC) chosen by various selectors for the 1968 NCAA University Division football season. Georgia won the conference.

== Offensive selections ==
=== Receivers ===
- Tim Christian, Auburn (AP-1, UPI)
- Sammy Milner, Miss. St. (AP-1, UPI)
- Donnie Sutton, Alabama (AP-2)
- Kent Lawrence, Georgia (AP-2)

=== Tight ends ===
- Ken DeLong, Tennessee (AP-2, UPI)
- Dennis Hughes, Georgia (AP-1)

=== Tackles ===
- David Rholetter, Georgia (AP-1, UPI)
- Bill Fortier, LSU (AP-1, UPI)
- Bob Asher, Vanderbilt (AP-2)
- Jerry Gordon, Auburn (AP-2)

=== Guards ===
- Charles Rosenfelder, Tennessee (AP-1, UPI)
- Guy Dennis, Florida (AP-2, UPI)
- Al Samples, Alabama (AP-1)
- Johnny McDonald, Auburn (AP-2)

=== Centers ===
- Chip Kell, Tennessee (College Football Hall of Fame) (AP-1)
- Tom Banks, Auburn (UPI)
- Godfrey Zaunbrecher, LSU (AP-2)

=== Quarterbacks ===
- Tommy Pharr, Miss. St. (AP-1)
- Loran Carter, Auburn (UPI)
- Mike Cavan, Georgia (AP-2)

=== Running backs ===
- Dicky Lyons, Kentucky (AP-1, UPI)
- Larry Smith, Florida (AP-2, UPI)
- Richard Pickens, Tennessee (AP-1)
- Richmond Flowers, Tennessee (AP-2)

== Defensive selections ==
=== Ends ===
- Billy Payne, Georgia (AP-1, UPI)
- Mike Ford, Alabama (AP-1, UPI)
- Neal McMeans, Tennessee (AP-2)
- Dick Palmer, Kentucky (AP-2)

=== Tackles ===
- Bill Stanfill, Georgia (College Football Hall of Fame) (AP-1, UPI)
- David Campbell, Auburn (AP-1, UPI)
- Dick Williams, Tennessee (AP-2)
- Randy Barron, Alabama (AP-2)

=== Middle guard ===
- Sammy Gellerstedt, Auburn (AP-1, UPI)
- Dave Roller, Kentucky (AP-2)

=== Linebackers ===
- Steve Kiner, Tennessee (College Football Hall of Fame) (AP-1, UPI)
- Mike Hall, Alabama (AP-1, UPI)
- Mike Kolen, Auburn (AP-1, UPI)
- Mike Anderson, LSU (AP-2)
- Frank Trapp, Mississippi (AP-2)
- Happy Dicks, Georgia (AP-2)

=== Backs ===
- Jake Scott, Georgia (College Football Hall of Fame) (AP-1, UPI)
- Steve Tannen, Florida (AP-2, UPI)
- Jim Weatherford, Tennessee (AP-2, UPI)
- Buddy McClinton, Auburn (AP-1)
- Glenn Cannon, Mississippi (AP-1)
- Gerry Kent, LSU (AP-2)

== Special teams ==
=== Kicker ===
- John Riley, Auburn (AP-1)
- Jim McCullough, Georgia (AP-2)

=== Punter ===
- Spike Jones, Georgia (AP-1)
- Julian Fagan, Mississippi (AP-2)

== Key ==
AP = Associated Press.

UPI = United Press International.

Bold = Consensus first-team selection by both AP and UPI

== See also ==
- 1968 College Football All-America Team
