= Steve Kiner =

American football player (1947–2025)

No. 60, 57
- Position: Linebacker

Personal information
- Born: June 12, 1947; Sandstone, Minnesota, U.S.
- Died: April 24, 2025 (aged 77); Palm Harbor, Florida, U.S.
- Listed height: 6 ft 1 in (1.85 m)
- Listed weight: 220 lb (100 kg)

Career information
- High school: Hillsborough (Tampa, Florida)
- College: Tennessee
- NFL draft: 1970: 3rd round, 73rd overall pick

Career history
- Dallas Cowboys (1970); New England Patriots (1971); Miami Dolphins (1972)*; Washington Redskins (1972)*; New England Patriots (1973); Houston Oilers (1974–1978)
- * Offseason or practice squad member only

Awards and highlights
- Unanimous All-American (1969); Consensus All-American (1968); SEC Defensive Player of the Year (1969); 2× First-team All-SEC (1968, 1969); Second-team All-SEC (1967); SEC Sophomore of the Year (1967)

Career NFL statistics
- Games played: 114
- Stats at Pro Football Reference
- College Football Hall of Fame

Steven Albert Kiner (June 12, 1947 – April 24, 2025) was an American professional football player who was a linebacker in the National Football League (NFL) for the Dallas Cowboys, New England Patriots, and Houston Oilers. He played college football for the Tennessee Volunteers, earning consensus All-American honors twice. He was inducted into the College Football Hall of Fame.

== Early life ==
Kiner was born in Sandstone, Minnesota, on June 12, 1947. His father was in the U.S. Army, and survived four years as a prisoner during World War II in Japan. The family lived in different Army bases, including Germany, Georgia and Switzerland. He attended Hillsborough High School in Tampa, Florida, where he was all-city and all-state on both offense (quarterback) and defense (strong safety). His football coach called him Killer Kiner. He also practiced basketball and Track.

== College career ==
Kiner originally accepted a football scholarship from the University of Florida, but after it was revoked, he decided to play for the University of Tennessee. He was converted into a linebacker and became a three-year starter. He played in the same linebacking unit as future NFL player Jack "Hacksaw" Reynolds and was named SEC Sophomore of the Year.

In 1968, he posted 12 tackles and 2 interceptions while playing against the University of Mississippi with a broken wrist. His talent made Bear Bryant state, "the best in this league since Lee Roy Jordan played for us". In 1969, he was awarded the SEC Defensive Player of the Year award. He also was a two-time All-SEC and All-American selection. He was a routine and open user of various recreational drugs throughout his college career, and was described as the "team hippy" for his unkempt appearance when he was drafted by the Cowboys, but stopped using drugs as his NFL career began.

== Professional career ==
=== Dallas Cowboys ===
Kiner was selected by the Dallas Cowboys in the third round (73rd overall) of the 1970 NFL draft. He roomed with Duane Thomas in training camp, and was recognized for his special teams play as a rookie, including Super Bowl V.

In 1971, he clashed with Tom Landry, after Chuck Howley was convinced to come back from retirement and gave him the position Kiner thought he deserved, forcing the team to trade him to the New England Patriots in exchange for a fourth round draft choice (#90-Robert West) on July 23.

=== New England Patriots (first stint) ===
With the New England Patriots he lasted just one season, where he became a starter and had 4 interceptions. In 1972, he was expelled from training camp by head coach John Mazur and traded to the Miami Dolphins in exchange for defensive lineman Bill Griffin on August 4.

=== Miami Dolphins ===
The Miami Dolphins waived Kiner before training camp ended on August 30, 1972.

=== Washington Redskins ===
On September 2, 1972, the Washington Redskins claimed him for their taxi squad. He was released on September 11, 1973.

=== New England Patriots (second stint) ===
On September 12, 1973, he was claimed by the New England Patriots and played one season. On January 30, 1974, he was traded to the Houston Oilers in exchange for a ninth round draft choice (#209-Ed McCartney).

=== Houston Oilers ===
Kiner turned his career around with the Houston Oilers playing in a 3-4 defense. He had five productive seasons and was credited by head coach Bum Phillips "for turning the Houston Oilers into winners". He was waived before the start of the season on August 27, 1979.

== Personal life and death ==
After football, Kiner earned two master's degrees from West Georgia College and got involved in health care, managing emergency psychiatric services for Emory Healthcare at the Emory University School of Medicine in Atlanta, Georgia. He was married to Carol (née Smith), and was the father of three daughters.

Kiner had Alzheimer's disease in later years, which he and his wife publicly attributed to the concussions he sustained during his playing career. He died in hospice care in Palm Harbor, Florida, on April 24, 2025, at the age of 77.

== Honors ==
- Tennessee Sports Hall of Fame, 1998
- College Football Hall of Fame, 1999
- SEC Legend class, 1999
- Tennessee Athletics Hall of Fame, 2016
