= 1967 All-SEC football team =

American college football all-star team

The 1967 All-SEC football team consists of American football players selected to the All-Southeastern Conference (SEC) chosen by various selectors for the 1967 NCAA University Division football season. Tennessee won the conference.

== Offensive selections ==
=== Receivers ===
- Dennis Homan, Alabama (AP-1, UPI)
- Richard Trapp, Florida (AP-1, UPI)
- Freddie Hyatt, Alabama (AP-2)
- Richmond Flowers, Tennessee (AP-2)
- Mac Haik, Ole Miss (AP-2)

=== Tight ends ===
- Bob Goodridge, Vanderbilt (AP-1, UPI)

=== Tackles ===
- Edgar Chandler, Georgia (AP-1, UPI)
- John Boynton, Tennessee (AP-1, UPI)
- Alan Bush, Ole Miss (AP-2)
- Elliott Gammage, Tennessee (AP-2)

=== Guards ===
- Guy Dennis, Florida (AP-1, UPI)
- Charles Rosenfelder, Tennessee (AP-1)
- Bruce Stephens, Alabama (AP-2, UPI)
- Don Hayes, Georgia (AP-2)

=== Centers ===
- Bob Johnson, Tennessee (AP-1, UPI)
- Barry Wilson, LSU (AP-2)

=== Quarterbacks ===
- Ken Stabler, Alabama (AP-1, UPI)
- Nelson Stokley, LSU (AP-2)

=== Running backs ===
- Larry Smith, Florida (AP-1, UPI)
- Ronnie Jenkins, Georgia (AP-1)
- Dicky Lyons, Kentucky (UPI)
- Steve Hindman, Ole Miss (AP-2)
- Walter Chadwick, Tennessee (AP-2)

== Defensive selections ==
=== Ends ===
- John Garlington, LSU (AP-1, UPI)
- Mike Ford, Alabama (AP-1)
- Larry Kohn, Georgia (UPI)
- Jerry Richardson, Ole Miss (AP-2)
- Nick Showalter, Tennessee (AP-2)

=== Tackles ===
- Bill Stanfill, Georgia (College Football Hall of Fame) (AP-1, UPI)
- Jim Urbanek, Ole Miss (AP-1, UPI)
- Charlie Collins, Auburn (AP-2)
- Glenn Higgins, Miss. St. (AP-2)

=== Middle guard ===
- Gusty Yearout, Auburn (AP-1, UPI)
- Don Giordano, Florida (AP-2)
- Dan Sartin, Ole Miss (AP-2)

=== Linebackers ===
- Mike Hall, Alabama (AP-1 [as MG], UPI)
- D. D. Lewis, Miss. St. (College Football Hall of Fame) (AP-1, UPI)
- Jimmy Keyes, Ole Miss (AP-1, UPI)
- Steve Kiner, Tennessee (College Football Hall of Fame) (AP-2)
- Robert Margeson, Auburn (AP-2)

=== Backs ===
- Albert Dorsey, Tennessee (AP-1, UPI)
- Sammy Grezaffi, LSU (AP-1, UPI)
- Jake Scott, Georgia (College Football Hall of Fame) (AP-1)
- Bobby Johns, Alabama (UPI)
- Buddy McClinton, Auburn (AP-2)
- Tommy James, Ole Miss (AP-2)
- Mike Jones, Tennessee (AP-2)

== Special teams ==
=== Kicker ===
- Wayne Barfield, Florida (AP-1)
- Karl Kremser, Tennessee (AP-2)

=== Punter ===
- Eddie Ray, LSU (AP-1)
- Julian Fagan, Ole Miss (AP-2)

== Key ==
AP = Associated Press

UPI = United Press International

Bold = Consensus first-team selection by both AP and UPI

== See also ==
- 1967 College Football All-America Team
