= Jack Reynolds (American football) =

American former football player (born 1947)

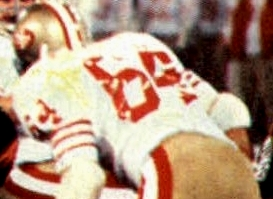
- San Francisco 49ers linebacker Reynolds pictured in a defensive play during Super Bowl XVI.

No. 54, 64
- Position: Linebacker

Personal information
- Born: November 22, 1947 (age 78); Cincinnati, Ohio, U.S.
- Listed height: 6 ft 1 in (1.85 m)
- Listed weight: 232 lb (105 kg)

Career information
- High school: Western Hills (Cincinnati)
- College: Tennessee
- NFL draft: 1970: 1st round, 22nd overall pick

Career history
- Los Angeles Rams (1970–1980); San Francisco 49ers (1981–1984)

Awards and highlights
- 2× Super Bowl champion (XVI, XIX); 2× Pro Bowl (1975, 1980); Third-team All-American (1969); First-team All-SEC (1969)

Career NFL statistics
- Games played: 198
- Games started: 162
- Interceptions: 6
- Stats at Pro Football Reference

John Sumner Reynolds (born November 22, 1947), nicknamed "Hacksaw", is an American former professional football player who was a linebacker in the National Football League (NFL). He was a first-round draft pick by the Los Angeles Rams in the 1970 NFL draft and played there 11 years before going to the San Francisco 49ers in 1981. He played with the 49ers for four more years and won two Super Bowls with them: Super Bowl XVI and Super Bowl XIX. He wore the number 64 throughout his career, and was named to two Pro Bowls.

== College career ==
Reynolds played college football for the Tennessee Volunteers, first as a fullback and then moving to linebacker. He earned his nickname in 1969 by cutting an abandoned 1953 Chevrolet Bel Air (some accounts claim it was a Porsche) in half with a hacksaw after his previously unbeaten Volunteers returned from an embarrassing 38–0 road loss to Ole Miss. "I came back to school and I was very upset," Reynolds said. "I had to do something to relieve my frustration." He decided to turn the abandoned car into a trailer for his newly purchased Jeep. After working through the night on the project, chewing through 13 hacksaw blades, he returned the next day with some teammates to show off his handiwork. However, when they arrived, both halves of the car were gone. For the remainder of his career, the nickname stuck.

== Professional career ==
After being drafted by the Rams and spending a decade in Los Angeles, he was released and signed by Bill Walsh and John McVay as a veteran presence for the defense on a $1 million contract over five years.

Reynolds' enthusiasm for football was such that he would show up at 49ers team breakfasts in full pads and eyeblack. Walsh said "He is consumed with football, even more than any addicted coach". Aside from his intensity, he was also known for being a studious player, turning up to his first training camp with the 49ers with his own projector so he could study film in his room, carrying around a large collection of pencils to take constant notes, and being the only player that the coaches entrusted with a key to the facilities. He also once refused to lend a pencil to then-rookie safety Ronnie Lott, stating that he wouldn't become a success in the NFL until he brought his own pencil to every meeting. Lott was elected to the Pro Football Hall of Fame after a 14-year career. Walsh credited Reynolds as being the most telling personnel move he ever made, stating "Jack gave us leadership and maturity and toughness and set an example for everybody...As strange a guy as he was, he really put us on the map. I think that single addition was the key to our success."

It was a condition of his last professional contract that he would become a coach immediately after retirement. However, he only lasted 12 days, allegedly finding the candid nature of player assessments by fellow coaches "unsettling". He retired from professional football after the brief coaching stint.

== Personal life ==
Reynolds currently splits his time between a house in Miami and another in the Caribbean.

== In popular culture ==
Reynolds appeared in a non-speaking role in The Simpsons season 10 episode "Sunday, Cruddy Sunday" when Dan Marino calls him and former Baltimore Colts defensive lineman Bubba Smith to tackle Homer for intercepting a pass meant for Bart.
