= Steve Greer =

Steve Greer (July 23, 1947 – December 13, 2021) was a college football position coach and executive between 1971 and 2009. During his playing career in the 1960s, he was the AA Lineman of the Year twice while at Greer High School and received All-America selections while at the University of Georgia. After briefly playing with the Toronto Argonauts in 1970, he started coaching the defensive line freshmen with the University of Georgia the following year. He continued his freshmen coaching experience with the offensive and defensive players at Auburn University until 1973. After moving to varsity football in 1974, he primarily continued his defensive coaching career with both universities until 1993.

During this time period, Greer was the recruiting coordinator and defensive end coach with Georgia from 1979 to 1981. After starting an administrative assistant role with Georgia in 1993, he resumed his recruiting coordinator position in 1994. Three years later, he became the Director of Football Operations. He remained in the role until he decided to leave the university in 2009. After his football tenure, Greer was with Jim Whitehead Tire Service during 2011. Greer joined the South Carolina Football Hall of Fame in 2019.

== Early life and education ==
Greer's birth occurred in Greer, South Carolina during July 23, 1947. During his childhood, he was a fruit packer and hunter. He began playing football at Greer High School in 1961. With the team, Greer played in the 1963 Upstate Class AA championship. That year, he was All-Southern and won the AA Lineman of the Year award.

During 1964, he was named "outstanding lineman" after his South Carolina team won the Shrine Bowl of the Carolinas. For that season, Greer was All-Southern and the AA Lineman of the Year. At the 1965 North-South All-Star, he was Outstanding Lineman and won with the North.

That year, Greer was on the freshman football team for the University of Georgia. He did not play in 1966 after knee surgery. Following his return to the team in 1967, Greer played at that year's Liberty Bowl. Additional bowl game appearances with Georgia were at the Sugar Bowl and Sun Bowl during 1969. That year, he became their captain. With the South, his team won the American Bowl and Hula Bowl in 1970.

== Career ==
In May 1970, Greer joined the Toronto Argonauts. He played on the team during July 1970 before being cut that month. In 1971, he was hired as a graduate assistant with Georgia. While there, Greer began his defensive line coaching career in freshman football. With his freshmen experience at Auburn University from 1972 to 1973, Greer was an offensive coach for one year and defensive coach for two years.

Greer continued working as a defensive coach after moving to Auburn's varsity football team in 1974. He remained in his position with the university until he became the recruiting coordinator at Georgia during 1979. With Georgia, he was also a defensive end coach before ending both positions in 1981. Greer resumed his defensive line experience with Georgia that year. He remained there as their coach until 1993.

Greer started his administrative assistant role in 1993. While in his position, he had become the recruiting coordinator by 1994. In 1997, Greer became the Director of Football Operations and left as coordinator. He remained as Director of Football Operations until he decided to leave Georgia in 2009. Outside of football, Greer was with Jim Whitehead Tire Service during 2011.

== Honors ==
While at Georgia, Greer was All-Southeastern Conference for United Press International and The Associated Press in 1969. For All-America selections, Greer was chosen in 1968 by the Central Press. The following year, he was All-America for Central Press and The Associated Press. Greer received the Lineman of the Year award from the Atlanta Touchdown Club during 1970. During 2014, he joined the Georgia Bulldogs Circle of Honor. He became part of the South Carolina Football Hall of Fame in 2019.

== Personal life and death ==
During the late 2010s, Greer began experiencing amyotrophic lateral sclerosis in his arms. He had three children during his marriage. Greer's death occurred in Athens, Georgia on December 13, 2021.
