= List of All-SEC football teams =

The All-SEC football team is an annual Southeastern Conference (SEC) honor bestowed on the best players in the conference following every college football season.

== Seasons ==
Following is a list of all-conference teams in the history of the SEC:

- 1933 All-SEC football team
- 1934 All-SEC football team
- 1935 All-SEC football team
- 1936 All-SEC football team
- 1937 All-SEC football team
- 1938 All-SEC football team
- 1939 All-SEC football team
- 1940 All-SEC football team
- 1941 All-SEC football team
- 1942 All-SEC football team
- 1943 All-SEC football team
- 1944 All-SEC football team
- 1945 All-SEC football team
- 1946 All-SEC football team
- 1947 All-SEC football team
- 1948 All-SEC football team
- 1949 All-SEC football team
- 1950 All-SEC football team
- 1951 All-SEC football team
- 1952 All-SEC football team
- 1953 All-SEC football team
- 1954 All-SEC football team
- 1955 All-SEC football team
- 1956 All-SEC football team
- 1957 All-SEC football team
- 1958 All-SEC football team
- 1959 All-SEC football team
- 1960 All-SEC football team
- 1961 All-SEC football team
- 1962 All-SEC football team
- 1963 All-SEC football team
- 1964 All-SEC football team
- 1965 All-SEC football team
- 1966 All-SEC football team
- 1967 All-SEC football team
- 1968 All-SEC football team
- 1969 All-SEC football team
- 1970 All-SEC football team
- 1971 All-SEC football team
- 1972 All-SEC football team
- 1973 All-SEC football team
- 1974 All-SEC football team
- 1975 All-SEC football team
- 1976 All-SEC football team
- 1977 All-SEC football team
- 1978 All-SEC football team
- 1979 All-SEC football team
- 1980 All-SEC football team
- 1981 All-SEC football team
- 1982 All-SEC football team
- 1983 All-SEC football team
- 1984 All-SEC football team
- 1985 All-SEC football team
- 1986 All-SEC football team
- 1987 All-SEC football team
- 1988 All-SEC football team
- 1989 All-SEC football team
- 1990 All-SEC football team
- 1991 All-SEC football team
- 1992 All-SEC football team
- 1993 All-SEC football team
- 1994 All-SEC football team
- 1995 All-SEC football team
- 1996 All-SEC football team
- 1997 All-SEC football team
- 1998 All-SEC football team
- 1999 All-SEC football team
- 2000 All-SEC football team
- 2001 All-SEC football team
- 2002 All-SEC football team
- 2003 All-SEC football team
- 2004 All-SEC football team
- 2005 All-SEC football team
- 2006 All-SEC football team
- 2007 All-SEC football team
- 2008 All-SEC football team
- 2009 All-SEC football team
- 2010 All-SEC football team
- 2011 All-SEC football team
- 2012 All-SEC football team
- 2013 All-SEC football team
- 2014 All-SEC football team
- 2015 All-SEC football team
- 2016 All-SEC football team
- 2017 All-SEC football team
- 2018 All-SEC football team
- 2019 All-SEC football team
- 2020 All-SEC football team
- 2021 All-SEC football team
- 2022 All-SEC football team
- 2023 All-SEC football team
- 2024 All-SEC football team
- 2025 All-SEC football team
