= 1974 Miami Dolphins season =

9th season in franchise history

- Owner: Joe Robbie
- General manager: Mike Robbie
- Head coach: Don Shula
- Home stadium: Miami Orange Bowl

Results
- Record: 11–3
- Division place: 1st AFC East
- Playoffs: Lost Divisional Playoffs (at Raiders) 26–28
- Pro Bowlers: 12; QB Bob Griese; LT Wayne Moore; LB Nick Buoniconti; RB Mercury Morris; C Jim Langer; WR Paul Warfield; FS Jake Scott; DE Bill Stanfill; FB Larry Csonka; K Garo Yepremian; G Larry Little; SS Dick Anderson

The 1974 Miami Dolphins season was the franchise's 5th season in the National Football League, the 9th overall, and the 5th under head coach Don Shula. The team entered the 1974 season as two-time defending Super Bowl champions. They could not improve on their 12–2 record from last season and finished 11–3. Despite this, the Dolphins finished first in the AFC East for the fourth consecutive season, and they finished with the second-best record in the NFL. In the playoffs, the Raiders beat the Dolphins 28–26 in the AFC Divisional Playoff Game in the famous "Sea of Hands" game.

== Offseason ==
=== NFL draft ===
1974 Miami Dolphins draft
Round	Pick	Player	Position	College	Notes
1	26	Don Reese	Defensive tackle	Jackson State	
2	38	Andre Tillman	Tight end	Texas Tech	
2	47	Benny Malone	Running back	Arizona State	
2	52	Jeris White	Defensive back	Hawaii	
3	78	Nat Moore *	Wide receiver	Florida	
4	104	Bill Stevenson	Defensive tackle	Drake	
5	130	Cleveland Vann	Linebacker	Oklahoma State	
6	136	Randy Crowder	Defensive end	Penn State	
6	156	Bob Wolfe	Tackle	Nebraska	
7	164	Carl Swierc	Wide receiver	Rice	
7	182	Joe Sullivan	Guard	Boston College	
8	208	Melvin Baker	Wide receiver	Texas Southern	
9	212	Tom Wickert	Guard	Washington State	
9	234	Bob Lally	Linebacker	Cornell	
10	260	Gary Valbuena	Quarterback	Tennessee	
11	286	Gerry Roberts	Defensive end	UCLA	
12	312	Jim Revels	Defensive back	Florida	
13	338	Clayton Heath	Running back	UCLA	
14	364	Sam Johnson	Linebacker	Arizona State	
15	390	Larry Gates	Defensive back	Western Michigan	
16	416	Jessie Wolf	Defensive tackle	Prairie View A&M	
17	442	Ken Dickerson	Defensive back	Tuskegee	Mr. Irrelevant
Made roster * Made at least one Pro Bowl during career

== Personnel ==
=== Staff ===
1974 Miami Dolphins staff
Front office: President – Joe Robbie; Vice President – Don Shula; Director of Player Personnel – Bobby Beathard; Head coaches: Head Coach – Don Shula; Offensive coaches: Offense – Monte Clark; Offense – Bill McPeak; Offensive Backs – Carl Taseff; Receivers – Bob Schnelker	Defensive coaches: Defense – Vince Costello; Defensive Line – Mike Scarry; Defensive Backs – Tom Keane; Special teams coaches: None - N/A; Strength and conditioning: None - N/A

=== Roster ===
1974 Miami Dolphins roster
Quarterbacks (QB): 12 Bob Griese; 15 Earl Morrall; 10 Don Strock; Running backs (RB): 39 Larry Csonka; 32 Hubert Ginn; 21 Jim Kiick; 32 Benny Malone; 22 Mercury Morris; 36 Don Nottingham; Wide receivers (WR): 82 Melvin Baker; 89 Nat Moore; 81 Howard Twilley; 42 Paul Warfield; Tight ends (TE): 80 Marv Fleming; 88 Jim Mandich	Offensive linemen (OL): 73 Norm Evans T; 70 Tom Funchess T; 55 Irv Goode C/G; 67 Bob Kuechenberg G; 62 Jim Langer C; 66 Larry Little G; 79 Wayne Moore T; 64 Ed Newman G; 60 Tom Wickert T; Defensive linemen (DL): 74 Randy Crowder DT; 83 Vern Den Herder DE; 75 Manny Fernandez DT; 72 Bob Heinz DT; 65 Maulty Moore DT; 76 Don Reese DE; 84 Bill Stanfill DE	Linebackers (LB): 51 Larry Ball OLB; 58 Bruce Bannon MLB; 85 Nick Buoniconti MLB; 57 Mike Kolen OLB; 53 Bob Matheson OLB; 59 Doug Swift OLB; Defensive backs (DB): 40 Dick Anderson SS; 49 Charlie Babb SS; 25 Tim Foley CB; 45 Curtis Johnson CB; 26 Lloyd Mumphord CB; 13 Jake Scott FS; 48 Henry Stuckey CB; 41 Jeris White CB; Special teams (ST): 20 Larry Seiple P; 1 Garo Yepremian K	Reserve: 86 Marlin Briscoe WR (IR); 77 Doug Crusan T (IR); 87 Andre Tillman TE (IR); Rookies in italics

== Regular season ==
=== Schedule ===
Week	Date	Opponent	Result	Record	Venue	Recap
1	September 15	at **New England Patriots**	**L** 24–34	0–1	Schaefer Stadium	Recap
2	September 22	at **Buffalo Bills**	**W** 24–16	1–1	Rich Stadium	Recap
3	September 29	at San Diego Chargers	**W** 28 –21	2–1	San Diego Stadium	Recap
4	October 7	**New York Jets**	**W** 21–17	3–1	Miami Orange Bowl	Recap
5	October 13	at Washington Redskins	**L** 17–20	3–2	Robert F. Kennedy Memorial Stadium	Recap
6	October 20	Kansas City Chiefs	**W** 9–3	4–2	Miami Orange Bowl	Recap
7	October 27	**Baltimore Colts**	**W** 17– 7	5–2	Miami Orange Bowl	Recap
8	November 3	Atlanta Falcons	**W** 42–7	6–2	Miami Orange Bowl	Recap
9	November 10	at New Orleans Saints	**W** 21–0	7–2	Tulane Stadium	Recap
10	November 17	**Buffalo Bills**	**W** 35–28	8–2	Miami Orange Bowl	Recap
11	November 24	at **New York Jets**	**L** 14–17	8–3	Shea Stadium	Recap
12	December 2	Cincinnati Bengals	**W** 24–3	9–3	Miami Orange Bowl	Recap
13	December 8	at **Baltimore Colts**	**W** 17–16	10–3	Memorial Stadium	Recap
14	December 15	**New England Patriots**	**W** 34–27	11–3	Miami Orange Bowl	Recap
Note: Intra-division opponents are in **bold** text.

=== Standings ===
AFC East
	W	L	T	PCT	DIV	CONF	PF	PA	STK
Miami Dolphins	11	3	0	.786	6–2	9–2	327	216	W3
Buffalo Bills	9	5	0	.643	5–3	7–4	264	244	L2
New York Jets	7	7	0	.500	4–4	5–6	279	300	W6
New England Patriots	7	7	0	.500	4–4	4–7	348	289	L3
Baltimore Colts	2	12	0	.143	1–7	1–10	190	329	L4

== Playoffs ==
=== AFC Divisional Playoff ===
AFC Divisional Playoff: Miami Dolphins at Oakland Raiders – Game summary

Quarter	1	2	3	4	Total
Dolphins	7	3	6	10	26
Raiders	0	7	7	14	28

at Oakland Coliseum, Oakland, California

- Date: December 21, 1974
- Game time: 4:00 p.m. EST/1:00 p.m. PST
- Game attendance: 53,023
- Referee: Ben Dreith
- TV announcers (NBC): Curt Gowdy, Al DeRogatis and Don Meredith

Game information
- Scoring
  - MIA – N. Moore 89 kickoff return (Yepremian kick) MIA 7–0
  - OAK – C. Smith 31 pass from Stabler (Blanda kick) 7–7
  - MIA – field goal Yepremian 33 MIA 10–7
  - OAK – Biletnikoff 13 pass from Stabler (Blanda kick) OAK 14–10
  - MIA – Warfield 16 pass from Griese (kick failed) MIA 16–14
  - MIA – field goal Yepremian 46 MIA 19–14
  - OAK – Branch 72 pass from Stabler (Blanda kick) OAK 21–19
  - MIA – Malone 23 run (Yepremian kick) MIA 26–21
  - OAK – Davis 8 pass from Stabler (Blanda kick) OAK 28–26
