= 1972 Miami Dolphins season =

American football season

- Owner: Joe Robbie
- Head coach: Don Shula
- Home stadium: Miami Orange Bowl

Results
- Record: 14–0
- Division place: 1st AFC East
- Playoffs: Won Divisional Playoffs (vs. Browns) 20–14; Won AFC Championship (at Steelers) 21–17; Won Super Bowl VII (vs. Redskins) 14–7
- All-Pros: 4: SS Dick Anderson; QB Earl Morrall; G Larry Little; DE Bill Stanfill
- Pro Bowlers: 9: SS Dick Anderson; MLB Nick Buoniconti; FB Larry Csonka; T Norm Evans; G Larry Little; RB Mercury Morris; FS Jake Scott; DE Bill Stanfill; WR Paul Warfield

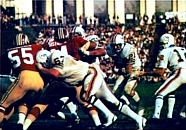
Jim Kiick (#21) rushes for Miami in Super Bowl VII

The 1972 Miami Dolphins season was the franchise's seventh season and third in the National Football League (NFL). The team was led by third-year head coach Don Shula and achieved the only perfect season in NFL history (and only the second perfect season in professional football history after the 1948 Cleveland Browns). The team also led the league in both points scored and fewest points allowed.

Starting quarterback Bob Griese broke his ankle in week 5, leaving backup Earl Morrall to start the remainder of the regular season, though Griese relieved Morrall in the second half of the AFC Championship Game and started Super Bowl VII. Morrall, a 38-year-old who spent much of his career backing up stars including Johnny Unitas, was named MVP in 1968 under Shula when the pair led the Baltimore Colts to the NFL championship. The Dolphins clinched the AFC East title in week 10 with Morrall at quarterback. None of their regular season opponents advanced to the eight-team postseason; three had made the previous postseason (Kansas City, Minnesota, Baltimore).

Running backs Larry Csonka and Mercury Morris became the first teammates to each rush for 1,000 yards in a season. Paul Warfield led the team in receptions and receiving yards, and Marlin Briscoe led the team in receiving touchdowns. The offensive line included future Hall of Famers Jim Langer and Larry Little.

The Dolphins' early-1970s defensive unit was termed the "No-Name Defense" by Dallas Cowboys head coach Tom Landry, given its lack of high-profile players (the unit's only Hall of Famer, linebacker Nick Buoniconti, achieved much of his success with the Boston Patriots in the 1960s and was not inducted until 2001). The defense was led by Buoniconti, end Bill Stanfill, tackle Manny Fernandez, and safeties Dick Anderson and Jake Scott. In all, nine Dolphins—Csonka, Morris, Warfield, Little, Norm Evans, Buoniconti, Stanfill, Anderson, and Scott—were selected to the Pro Bowl, and Little, Morrall, Stanfill, and Anderson were named first-team All-Pro.

The Dolphins went 14–0 in the regular season, the best record in the league by three games, and won all three postseason games to finish 17–0. Three other teams, the Chicago Bears in 1934 and 1942 and the New England Patriots in 2007, reached the NFL's title game undefeated and untied, but all three lost the championship. Four other teams, the Akron Pros in 1920, the Canton Bulldogs in 1922 and 1923, and the Green Bay Packers in 1929, won the NFL championship with an undefeated record, but all recorded at least one tie. The 1985 Chicago Bears' bid for an undefeated season was snapped by the Dolphins in their game 13 Monday Night Football meeting. Miami led the league in total offense, total defense, scoring offense, and scoring defense, the only team ever to do so. On August 20, 2013, four decades after the perfect season, President Barack Obama hosted the surviving members of the 1972 Dolphins, noting they "never got their White House visit." Fifty years later, on October 23, 2022, the 1972 Dolphins were honored at halftime during a Sunday Night Football game featuring the Miami Dolphins and Pittsburgh Steelers, the same matchup that occurred for the 1972 AFC Championship Game. For the 50th anniversary celebration, the Dolphins wore throwback uniforms as well as patches bearing a classic Dolphins logo, the number 50, and the years 1972 and 2022.

The 1972 Dolphins ranked number 1 on the 100 greatest teams of all time by the NFL on its 100th anniversary.

== Background ==
The Miami Dolphins franchise was founded in 1966 under head coach George Wilson. Wilson led the Dolphins to just fifteen wins in four seasons before being fired and replaced by Baltimore Colts head coach Don Shula. Despite his poor record, many of Wilson's player acquisitions contributed to the Dolphins' success in the early 1970s. The team drafted quarterback Bob Griese in 1967, fullback Larry Csonka in 1968, and defensive end Bill Stanfill and running back Mercury Morris in 1969. Wilson also signed Manny Fernandez and traded for Nick Buoniconti, Larry Little, and Paul Warfield. Wilson was initially resentful of the Dolphins' success, believing his firing was premature and Shula had inherited a "ready-made team". However, tension between Wilson and Shula lessened after the team won Super Bowl VII, and Wilson congratulated Shula and invited him to play at his golf course.

After accepting the job in Miami, Shula hired Howard Schnellenberger as offensive coordinator, Bill Arnsparger (who had served as defensive line coach under Shula in Baltimore) as defensive coordinator, Carl Taseff as offensive backs coach, Monte Clark as offensive line coach, and Mike Scarry as defensive line coach, and retained defensive backs coach Tom Keane from Wilson's staff; each of these coaches remained with the team through 1972. In the 1970 draft and ensuing free agency period, Shula added cornerback Tim Foley, safety Jake Scott, guard Bob Kuechenberg, and future Hall of Fame center Jim Langer. In Shula's first season, the Dolphins went 10–4 and reached the playoffs for the first time. Miami returned to the playoffs in 1971 and defeated the Kansas City Chiefs in the longest game in NFL history to secure the franchise's first playoff victory. The Dolphins shut out the Baltimore Colts, Shula's former team, to reach Super Bowl VI, where they lost 24–3 to Dallas.

== Off-season ==
=== NFL draft ===
1972 Miami Dolphins draft
Round	Pick	Player	Position	College	Notes
1	25	Mike Kadish	Defensive tackle	Notre Dame	
3	77	Gary Kosins	Running back	Dayton	Signed with the Chicago Bears
4	91	Larry Ball	Linebacker	Louisville	
4	105	Al Denton	Tackle	Ohio	
5	129	Charlie Babb	Safety	Memphis	
6	155	Ray Nettles	Linebacker	Tennessee	Signed with the BC Lions
7	161	Bill Adams	Guard	Holy Cross	Signed with the Buffalo Bills
7	180	Calvin Harrell	Running back	Arkansas State	Signed with the Edmonton Eskimos
8	207	Craig Curry	Quarterback	Minnesota	
8	233	Greg Johnson	Defensive back	Wisconsin	
11	285	Ed Jenkins	Wide receiver	Holy Cross	
12	311	Ashley Bell	Tight end	Purdue	
13	337	Archie Robinson	Defensive back	Hillsdale	
14	362	Willie Jones	Linebacker	Tampa	
15	389	Bill Davis	Defensive tackle	William & Mary	
16	415	Al Hannah	Wide receiver	Wisconsin	
17	441	Vern Brown	Defensive back	Western Michigan	
Made roster † Pro Football Hall of Fame * Made at least one Pro Bowl during career

== Staff ==
1972 Miami Dolphins staff
Front office: Team Owner / President – Joe Robbie; Vice president – Don Shula; Director of player personnel – Joe Thomas; Head coaches {{{head_coach}}} Offensive coaches: Offense/receivers – Howard Schnellenberger; Offensive backs – Carl Taseff; Offensive line – Monte Clark	Defensive coaches: Defense/linebackers – Bill Arnsparger; Defensive line – Mike Scarry; Defensive backs – Tom Keane; Special teams coaches: None - N/A; Strength and conditioning: None - N/A

== Roster ==
1972 Miami Dolphins roster
Quarterbacks (QB): 15 Earl Morrall; 11 Jim Del Gaizo; 12 Bob Griese; Running backs (RB): 22 Mercury Morris; 39 Larry Csonka FB; 21 Jim Kiick; 23 Charles Leigh FB; 32 Hubert Ginn; 28 Ed Jenkins; Wide receivers (WR): 81 Howard Twilley; 42 Paul Warfield; 86 Marlin Briscoe; 28 Ed Jenkins; 82 Otto Stowe; Tight ends (TE): 80 Marv Fleming; 88 Jim Mandich	Offensive linemen (OL): 77 Doug Crusan T; 67 Bob Kuechenberg G; 62 Jim Langer C; 66 Larry Little G; 73 Norm Evans T; 54 Howard Kindig T; 60 Al Jenkins G; 79 Wayne Moore T; Defensive linemen (DL): 83 Vern Den Herder DE; 75 Manny Fernandez DT; 72 Bob Heinz DT; 84 Bill Stanfill DE; 78 Jim Dunaway DT (IR); 65 Maulty Moore DT	Linebackers (LB): 59 Doug Swift; 85 Nick Buoniconti; 57 Mike Kolen; 51 Larry Ball; 53 Bob Matheson; 56 Jesse Powell; Defensive backs (DB): 25 Tim Foley CB; 45 Curtis Johnson CB; 40 Dick Anderson SS; 13 Jake Scott FS; 49 Charlie Babb SS; 43 Mike Howell FS; 26 Lloyd Mumphord CB; 48 Henry Stuckey; Special teams (ST): 1 Garo Yepremian K; 20 Larry Seiple P; 7 Billy Lothridge P	Practice squad: -- Mike Kadish DT; Reserve: 44 Tom Curtis FS (IR); 89 Karl Noonan WR (IR); Rookies in italics

== Preseason ==
Week	Date	Opponent	Result	Record	Venue
1	August 5	at Detroit Lions	L 23–31	0–1	Tiger Stadium
2	August 12	Green Bay Packers	L 13–14	0–2	Miami Orange Bowl
3	August 19	at Cincinnati Bengals	W 35–17	1–2	Riverfront Stadium
4	August 25	Atlanta Falcons	W 24–10	2–2	Miami Orange Bowl
5	August 31	at Washington Redskins	L 24–27	2–3	Robert F. Kennedy Memorial Stadium
6	September 10	Minnesota Vikings	W 21–19	3–3	Miami Orange Bowl

== Regular season ==
Week	Date	Opponent	Result	Record	Venue	Recap
1	September 17	at Kansas City Chiefs	**W** 20–10	1–0	Arrowhead Stadium	Recap
2	September 24	Houston Oilers	**W** 34–13	2–0	Miami Orange Bowl	Recap
3	October 1	at Minnesota Vikings	**W** 16–14	3–0	Metropolitan Stadium	Recap
4	October 8	at **New York Jets**	**W** 27–17	4–0	Shea Stadium	Recap
5	October 15	San Diego Chargers	**W** 24–10	5–0	Miami Orange Bowl	Recap
6	October 22	**Buffalo Bills**	**W** 24–23	6–0	Miami Orange Bowl	Recap
7	October 29	at **Baltimore Colts**	**W** 23–0	7–0	Memorial Stadium	Recap
8	November 5	at **Buffalo Bills**	**W** 30–16	8–0	War Memorial Stadium	Recap
9	November 12	**New England Patriots**	**W** 52–0	9–0	Miami Orange Bowl	Recap
10	November 19	**New York Jets**	**W** 28–24	10–0	Miami Orange Bowl	Recap
11	November 27	St. Louis Cardinals	**W** 31–10	11–0	Miami Orange Bowl	Recap
12	December 3	at **New England Patriots**	**W** 37–21	12–0	Schaefer Stadium	Recap
13	December 10	at New York Giants	**W** 23–13	13–0	Yankee Stadium	Recap
14	December 16	**Baltimore Colts**	**W** 16–0	14–0	Miami Orange Bowl	Recap
Note: Intra-division opponents are in **bold** text.

=== Game summaries ===
==== Week 1: at Kansas City Chiefs ====
Week 1: Miami Dolphins at Kansas City Chiefs – Game summary

Quarter	1	2	3	4	Total
**Dolphins**	7	10	3	0	**20**
Chiefs	0	0	3	7	**10**

at Arrowhead Stadium, Kansas City, Missouri

- Date: September 17
- Game time: 4:00 p.m. EDT/3:00 p.m. CDT
- Game weather: 91 °F (33 °C)
- Referee: Jim Tunney
- TV announcers (NBC): Curt Gowdy and Al DeRogatis
- Box score

Game information

**First quarter**

- MIA – Marlin Briscoe 14-yard pass from Bob Griese (Garo Yepremian kick). Dolphins 7–0.

**Second quarter**

- MIA – Garo Yepremian 47-yard field goal. Dolphins 10–0.
- MIA – Larry Csonka 2-yard run (Garo Yepremian kick). Dolphins 17–0.

**Third quarter**

- MIA – Garo Yepremian 15-yard field goal. Dolphins 20–0.
- KC – Jan Stenerud 40-yard field goal. Dolphins 20–3.

**Fourth quarter**

- KC – Willie Frazier 4-yard pass from Len Dawson (Jan Stenerud kick). Dolphins 20–10.

**Top passers**

- MIA – Bob Griese – 8/15, 111 yards, TD, INT
- KC – Len Dawson – 22/33, 237 yards, TD, 2 INT

**Top rushers**

- MIA – Larry Csonka – 21 rushes, 118 yards, TD
- KC – Ed Podolak – 13 rushes, 81 yards

**Top receivers**

- MIA – Paul Warfield – 2 receptions, 49 yards
- KC – Otis Taylor – 4 receptions, 69 yards

The Dolphins opened the season against the Chiefs in the first regular season game at Arrowhead Stadium. In the Divisional Round the year prior, Miami defeated Kansas City at Kansas City Municipal Stadium in double overtime, the longest game in NFL history.

On the Chiefs' first drive, Miami safety Dick Anderson recovered an Ed Podolak fumble, leading to a seven-play, 57-yard drive capped by a 14-yard touchdown from Bob Griese to Marlin Briscoe. Lloyd Mumphord blocked a Jan Stenerud field goal attempt on Kansas City's ensuing drive. Late in the second quarter, the Dolphins scored twice in quick succession – a 47-yard Garo Yepremian field goal and a two-yard Larry Csonka run following an interception by Jake Scott. The Chiefs did not score until a 40-yard field goal by Stenerud late in the third quarter, and a touchdown from Len Dawson to Willie Frazier was the only score of the fourth quarter as Miami won 20–10.

==== Week 2: vs. Houston Oilers ====
Week 2: Houston Oilers at Miami Dolphins – Game summary

Quarter	1	2	3	4	Total
Oilers	0	0	13	0	**13**
**Dolphins**	13	7	7	7	**34**

at Miami Orange Bowl, Miami, Florida

- Date: September 24
- Game time: 1:00 p.m. EST
- Game weather: Rain, 77 °F (25 °C)
- Referee: Fred Silva
- TV announcers (NBC): Jay Randolph and Johnny Morris
- Box score

Game information

**First quarter**

- MIA – Jim Kiick 1-yard run (Garo Yepremian kick). Dolphins 7–0.
- MIA – Mercury Morris 2-yard run (kick blocked). Dolphins 13–0.

**Second quarter**

- MIA – Larry Csonka 4-yard run (Garo Yepremian kick). Dolphins 20–0.

**Third quarter**

- MIA – Bob Griese 2-yard run (Garo Yepremian kick). Dolphins 27–0.
- HOU – Charlie Joiner 82-yard pass from Dan Pastorini (kick failed). Dolphins 27–6.
- HOU – Willie Rodgers 1-yard run (Skip Butler kick). Dolphins 27–13.

**Fourth quarter**

- MIA – Jim Kiick 6-yard pass from Bob Griese (Garo Yepremian kick). Dolphins 34–13.

**Top passers**

- HOU – Dan Pastorini – 9/21, 104 yards, TD, INT
- MIA – Bob Griese – 11/16, 142 yards, TD, INT

**Top rushers**

- HOU – Hoyle Granger – 12 rushes, 48 yards
- MIA – Mercury Morris – 15 rushes, 94 yards, TD

**Top receivers**

- HOU – Charlie Joiner – 2 receptions, 80 yards, TD
- MIA – Paul Warfield – 3 receptions, 67 yards

The Orange Bowl's new Poly-Turf field and intermittent rains led to slippery conditions for Miami's week 2 meeting with Houston. Less than two minutes in, Bill Stanfill returned a Hoyle Granger fumble to Houston's one-yard line to set up a Jim Kiick touchdown. Minutes later, Houston quarterback Dan Pastorini muffed the ball in punt formation; the Dolphins recovered again and Mercury Morris scored four plays later. Garo Yepremian's subsequent extra point attempt was blocked, his first miss after seventy-five consecutive successful attempts. Miami engineered another four-play scoring drive on its following possession, using a 30-yard Paul Warfield reception to set up a short Larry Csonka touchdown and give the Dolphins a 20–0 halftime lead. Pastorini completed three of ten passes for minus-ten yards in the first half.

A nine-play, 76-yard drive to open the second half pushed Miami further ahead. A long Charlie Joiner touchdown got Houston on the board and a second score after a Morris fumble cut Miami's lead to 27–13. However, Kiick's second touchdown following a fourteen-play drive in the fourth quarter put the game out of reach, and a Tim Foley interception sealed a 34–13 Dolphins victory.

==== Week 3: at Minnesota Vikings ====
Week 3: Miami Dolphins at Minnesota Vikings – Game summary

Quarter	1	2	3	4	Total
**Dolphins**	0	0	6	10	**16**
Vikings	7	0	0	7	**14**

at Metropolitan Stadium, Minneapolis, Minnesota

- Date: October 1
- Game time: 4:00 p.m. EDT/3:00 p.m. CDT
- Game weather: 56 °F (13 °C)
- Referee: Tommy Bell
- TV announcers (NBC): Curt Gowdy and Al DeRogatis
- Box score

Game information

**First quarter**

- MIN – John Gilliam 56-yard pass from Fran Tarkenton (Fred Cox kick). Vikings 7–0.

**Second quarter**

- No scoring plays

**Third quarter**

- MIA – Garo Yepremian 38-yard field goal. Vikings 7–3.
- MIA – Garo Yepremian 42-yard field goal. Vikings 7–6.

**Fourth quarter**

- MIN – Bill Brown 1-yard run (Fred Cox kick). Vikings 14–6.
- MIA – Garo Yepremian 51-yard field goal. Vikings 14–9.
- MIA – Jim Mandich 3-yard pass from Bob Griese (Garo Yepremian kick). Dolphins 16–14.

**Top passers**

- MIA – Bob Griese – 16/33, 127 yards, TD, 2 INT
- MIN – Fran Tarkenton – 10/23, 142 yards, TD, 3 INT

**Top rushers**

- MIA – Larry Csonka – 10 rushes, 66 yards
- MIN – Oscar Reed – 9 receptions, 52 yards

**Top receivers**

- MIA – Jim Mandich – 3 receptions, 39 yards, TD
- MIN – John Gilliam – 3 receptions, 91 yards, TD

The first-ever meeting between the Dolphins and Vikings began with a long first-quarter touchdown from Fran Tarkenton to John Gilliam; Minnesota held this 7–0 lead into halftime. Tim Foley intercepted Tarkenton early in the third quarter, setting up a 51-yard Garo Yepremian field goal. A second Yepremian field goal cut Minnesota's lead to one point, but the Vikings responded with thirteen-play drive which ended in a touchdown on the first play of the fourth quarter.

Minnesota quickly regained possession by intercepting Bob Griese, but two sacks of Tarkenton kept Minnesota out of field goal range and the game at 14–6. On Miami's ensuing drive, a 22-yard pass from wide receiver Marlin Briscoe to Jim Mandich set up another 51-yard Yepremian field goal. A short Vikings punt was followed by a six-play Miami drive and a three-yard touchdown pass from Griese to Mandich to give the Dolphins a 16–14 win. The Dolphins sacked Tarkenton five times and intercepted him three times.

==== Week 4: at New York Jets ====
Week 4: Miami Dolphins at New York Jets – Game summary

Quarter	1	2	3	4	Total
**Dolphins**	0	14	3	10	**27**
Jets	7	0	3	7	**17**

at Shea Stadium, Flushing, New York

- Date: October 8
- Game time: 1:00 p.m. EDT
- Game weather: 57 °F (14 °C)
- Referee: Dick Jorgensen
- TV announcers (NBC): Jay Randolph and Dave Kocourek
- Box score

Game information

**First quarter**

- NYJ – Randy Rasmussen 0-yard fumble return (Bobby Howfield kick). Jets 7–0.

**Second quarter**

- MIA – Howard Twilley 16-yard pass from Bob Griese (Garo Yepremian kick). Tied 7–7.
- MIA – Jim Kiick 6-yard run (Garo Yepremian kick). Dolphins 14–7.

**Third quarter**

- MIA – Garo Yepremian 27-yard field goal. Dolphins 17–7.
- NYJ – Bobby Howfield 18-yard field goal. Dolphins 17–10.

**Fourth quarter**

- MIA – Jim Kiick 3-yard run (Garo Yepremian kick). Dolphins 24–10.
- NYJ – Emerson Boozer 1-yard run (Bobby Howfield kick). Dolphins 24–17.
- MIA – Garo Yepremian 43-yard field goal. Dolphins 27–17.

**Top passers**

- MIA – Bob Griese – 15/27, 220 yards, TD
- NYJ – Joe Namath – 12/25, 156 yards, INT

**Top rushers**

- MIA – Larry Csonka – 18 rushes, 102 yards
- NYJ – John Riggins – 10 rushes, 50 yards

**Top receivers**

- MIA – Paul Warfield – 5 receptions, 71 yards
- NYJ – Jerome Barkum – 4 receptions, 76 yards

The Jets received the opening kickoff and quickly marched 65 yards downfield, taking a 7–0 lead when a Cliff McClain fumble was recovered by guard Randy Rasmussen in the end zone. New York maintained this advantage until early in the second quarter when a 16-yard touchdown pass from Bob Griese to Howard Twilley tied the game. A six-yard Jim Kiick touchdown run gave Miami a 14–7 lead just before halftime.

A field goal early in the third quarter increased Miami's lead to ten points. On New York's subsequent drive, Joe Namath found Jerome Barkum for a 52-yard gain which gave the Jets first-and-goal at the one-yard line. However, two penalties and three failed attempts forced New York to settle for an 18-yard Bobby Howfield field goal, cutting the lead to 17–10. Early in the fourth quarter, Miami capitalized on a long pass interference penalty against Steve Tannen with a second Jim Kiick touchdown run. Miami fumbled a punt deep in its own territory in the fourth quarter and allowed New York cut the lead to 24–17, but a late field goal put the game out of reach as the Dolphins won 27–17.

==== Week 5: vs. San Diego Chargers ====
Week 5: San Diego Chargers at Miami Dolphins – Game summary

Quarter	1	2	3	4	Total
Chargers	3	0	0	7	**10**
**Dolphins**	3	14	7	0	**24**

at Miami Orange Bowl, Miami, Florida

- Date: October 15
- Game time: 1:00 p.m. EDT
- Game weather: 78 °F (26 °C)
- Referee: Chuck Heberling
- TV announcers (KCST): Jerry Gross and Mike Smith
- Box score

Game information

**First quarter**

- MIA – Garo Yepremian 37-yard field goal. Dolphins 3–0.
- SD – Dennis Partee 12-yard field goal. Tied 3–3.

**Second quarter**

- MIA – Dick Anderson 35-yard fumble return (Garo Yepremian kick). Dolphins 10–3.
- MIA – Howard Twilley 18-yard pass from Earl Morrall (Garo Yepremian kick). Dolphins 17–3.

**Third quarter**

- MIA – Paul Warfield 19-yard pass from Earl Morrall (Garo Yepremian kick). Dolphins 24–3.

**Fourth quarter**

- SD – Cid Edwards 3-yard pass from John Hadl (Bill McClard kick). Dolphins 24–10.

**Top passers**

- SD – John Hadl – 12/22, 117 yards, TD, 2 INT
- MIA – Earl Morrall – 8/10, 86 yards, 2 TD

**Top rushers**

- SD – Mike Garrett – 22 rushes, 68 yards
- MIA – Larry Csonka – 13 rushes, 70 yards

**Top receivers**

- SD – Cid Edwards – 4 receptions, 39 yards, TD
- MIA – Howard Twilley – 2 receptions, 41 yards, TD

The Dolphins and Chargers traded first-quarter field goals before Dick Anderson returned a fumble 35 yards for a touchdown to give Miami a 10–3 lead. The Dolphins scored a second touchdown on an 18-yard pass from Earl Morrall to Howard Twilley to take a 17–3 lead into halftime. In the third quarter, Morrall's second touchdown pass increased the lead to 24–3. A late San Diego touchdown made the final score 24–10 as the Dolphins moved to 5–0.

Dolphins quarterback Bob Griese broke his ankle early in the first quarter on a sack by Ron East and Deacon Jones. He did not play again until late in the last game of the regular season; Griese was replaced by the 38-year-old Morrall until returning in the AFC Championship Game.

==== Week 6: vs. Buffalo Bills ====
Week 6: Buffalo Bills at Miami Dolphins – Game summary

Quarter	1	2	3	4	Total
Bills	0	13	0	10	**23**
**Dolphins**	7	0	10	7	**24**

at Miami Orange Bowl, Miami, Florida

- Date: October 22
- Game time: 1:00 p.m. EDT
- Game weather: 77 °F (25 °C)
- Referee: Ben Dreith
- TV announcers (WKBW): Rick Azar and Paul Maguire
- Box score

Game information

**First quarter**

- MIA – Mercury Morris 5-yard run (Garo Yepremian kick). Dolphins 7–0.

**Second quarter**

- BUF – John Leypoldt 35-yard field goal. Dolphins 7–3.
- BUF – Ken Lee 16-yard interception return (John Leypoldt kick). Bills 10–7.
- BUF – John Leypoldt 34-yard field goal. Bills 13–7.

**Third quarter**

- MIA – Larry Csonka 10-yard run (Garo Yepremian kick). Dolphins 14–13.
- MIA – Garo Yepremian 54-yard field goal. Dolphins 17–13.

**Fourth quarter**

- BUF – John Leypoldt 45-yard field goal. Dolphins 17–16.
- MIA – Mercury Morris 15-yard run (Garo Yepremian kick). Dolphins 24–16.
- BUF – Jim Braxton 6-yard pass from Mike Taliaferro (John Leypoldt kick). Dolphins 24–23.

**Top passers**

- BUF – Dennis Shaw – 3/6, 29 yards
- MIA – Earl Morrall – 6/10, 91 yards, INT

**Top rushers**

- BUF – Jim Braxton – 9 rushes, 75 yards
- MIA – Larry Csonka – 18 rushes, 107 yards, TD

**Top receivers**

- BUF – Jim Braxton – 2 receptions, 18 yards, TD
- MIA – Howard Twilley – 2 receptions, 41 yards

The Dolphins remained at home during week 6 for a game against the division rival Buffalo Bills. Miami scored a touchdown on the opening drive, capped off by a five-yard run by Mercury Morris. After regaining possession later in the first quarter, the Dolphins managed to reach the Bills seven-yard line. However, four failed attempts at reaching the end zone gave the Bills possession again. Then, in the second quarter, Dolphins running back Jim Kiick fumbled the ball, recovered by Alvin Wyatt of the Bills. This ultimately set up a 35-yard field goal by Buffalo's John Leypoldt. Shortly after, Bills linebacker Ken Lee intercepted a pass from Earl Morrall and returned it for a touchdown. Late in the second quarter, Morrall attempted to throw a lateral pass, but fumbled and Buffalo defensive tackle Don Croft secured the ball. Leypoldt then kicked a 34-yard field goal, allowing the Bills to lead 13–7 at halftime.

Dolphins tackle Manny Fernandez strip-sacked Bills quarterback Dennis Shaw at the Buffalo 10-yard line on the first play of the third quarter. Miami fullback Larry Csonka then ran 10 yards into the end zone, allowing the Dolphins to take a 14–13 lead. A few minutes after this transpired, Dolphins cornerback Curtis Johnson blocked a punt by Spike Jones of the Bills. After the Dolphins were penalized four times on that drive (a loss of 33 yards), Garo Yepremian kicked a 54-yard field goal, the longest in franchise history until Pete Stoyanovich's 59-yard field goal in 1989. The fourth quarter began with a 45-yard field goal by Leypoldt, cutting Miami's lead to 17–16. With 9:18 remaining in the final period, the Dolphins scored again with a 15-yard run by Morris, amassing 106 rushing yards in the game. Later, the Bills capped off a touchdown-scoring drive with a six-yard pass from quarterback Mike Taliaferro to fullback Jim Braxton. However, with only about one minute remaining by then, the Dolphins won the game by a score of 24–23.

The Dolphins were forced to wear their aqua jerseys because the Bills packed their white jerseys instead of their blue ones for the trip. The NFL fined Buffalo $5,000 for its mistake.

==== Week 7: at Baltimore Colts ====
Week 7: Miami Dolphins at Baltimore Colts – Game summary

Quarter	1	2	3	4	Total
**Dolphins**	7	9	7	0	**23**
Colts	0	0	0	0	**0**

at Memorial Stadium, Baltimore, Maryland

- Date: October 29
- Game time: 4:00 p.m. EST
- Game weather: 59 °F (15 °C)
- Referee: Bob Frederic
- TV announcers (NBC): Curt Gowdy and Al DeRogatis
- Box score

Game information

**First quarter**

- MIA – Larry Csonka 1-yard run (Garo Yepremian kick). Dolphins 7–0.

**Second quarter**

- MIA – Larry Csonka 1-yard run (kick blocked). Dolphins 13–0.
- MIA – Garo Yepremian 24-yard field goal. Dolphins 16–0.

**Third quarter**

- MIA – Mercury Morris 7-yard run (Garo Yepremian kick). Dolphins 23–0.

**Fourth quarter**

- No scoring plays

**Top passers**

- MIA – Earl Morrall – 9/15, 85 yards, INT
- BAL – Marty Domres – 13/21, 102 yards

**Top rushers**

- MIA – Larry Csonka – 19 rushes, 93 yards, 2 TD
- BAL – Don Nottingham – 9 rushes, 43 yards

**Top receivers**

- MIA – Howard Twilley – 2 receptions, 46 yards
- BAL – Tom Mitchell – 2 receptions, 31 yards

The Dolphins then traveled to Memorial Stadium in Baltimore for a match against the Colts on October 29. Miami scored in the first quarter on an 80-yard drive that included a 20-yard pass from quarterback Earl Morrall to wide receiver Howard Twilley, a 32-yard rush by running back Larry Csonka, a 19-yard rush by running back Mercury Morris, and finally a one-yard rush by Csonka for a touchdown. Garo Yepremian's extra point allowed the Dolphins to take a 7–0 lead. Dolphins cornerback Curtis Johnson blocked a punt by David Lee of the Colts and recovered the football at Baltimore's 22-yard line. A few plays later, at 3rd and 15 on Baltimore's 27-yard line, Morrall threw the ball to wide receiver Marlin Briscoe, who then threw a pass to wide receiver Paul Warfield at the one-yard line. Csonka then ran one-yard for a touchdown, but defensive tackle Jim Bailey blocked Yepremian's extra point attempt.

Later in the second quarter, Dolphins defensive back Lloyd Mumphord blocked Boris Shlapak's field goal attempt. The second quarter then ended after Yepremian kicked a 24-yard field goal. The Dolphins led 16–0 after the first half. The game's final score occurred in the third quarter. Bruce Laird of the Colts was returning a punt but fumbled the ball, which was recovered by Hubert Ginn of the Dolphins at Baltimore's 20 yard line. After a few more plays, Morris scored a seven-yard rushing touchdown, followed by a Yepremian extra point. Miami won the game with a score of 23–0 and improved to 7–0 at the halfway point of the regular season.

==== Week 8: at Buffalo Bills ====
Week 8: Miami Dolphins at Buffalo Bills – Game summary

Quarter	1	2	3	4	Total
**Dolphins**	10	6	7	7	**30**
Bills	6	7	3	0	**16**

at War Memorial Stadium, Buffalo, New York

- Date: November 5
- Game time: 1:00 p.m. EST
- Game weather: 41 °F (5 °C)
- Referee: John McDonough
- TV announcers (NBC): Ken Coleman and Dave Kocourek
- Box score

Game information

**First quarter**

- MIA – Garo Yepremian 33-yard field goal. Dolphins 3–0.
- BUF – Randy Jackson 13-yard pass from Dennis Shaw (kick blocked). Bills 6–3.
- MIA – Mercury Morris 22-yard run (Garo Yepremian kick). Dolphins 10–6.

**Second quarter**

- MIA – Garo Yepremian 17-yard field goal. Dolphins 13–6.
- MIA – Garo Yepremian 16-yard field goal. Dolphins 16–6.
- BUF – Tony Greene 39-yard interception return (John Leypoldt kick). Dolphins 16–13.

**Third quarter**

- MIA – Marv Fleming 7-yard pass from Earl Morrall (Garo Yepremian kick). Dolphins 23–13.
- BUF – John Leypoldt 28-yard field goal. Dolphins 23–16.

**Fourth quarter**

- MIA – Mercury Morris 4-yard run (Garo Yepremian kick). Dolphins 30–16.

**Top passers**

- MIA – Earl Morrall – 5/14, 89 yards, TD, INT
- BUF – Dennis Shaw – 12/23, 125 yards, TD, 2 INT

**Top rushers**

- MIA – Mercury Morris – 11 rushes, 106 yards, 2 TD
- BUF – O. J. Simpson – 13 rushes, 45 yards

**Top receivers**

- MIA – Marv Fleming – 2 receptions, 38 yards, TD
- BUF – J. D. Hill – 4 receptions, 55 yards

For week 8, the Dolphins traveled to War Memorial Stadium in Buffalo to take on the Bills on November 5. A Garo Yepremian 33-yard field goal allowed Miami to take an early 3–0 lead. The Bills then overtook the Dolphins on a drive capped off by quarterback Dennis Shaw throwing a 13-yard pass to running back Randy Jackson, although John Leypoldt's extra point attempt would be blocked. Buffalo now led Miami by a score of 6–3. However, the Dolphins reclaimed the lead on a possession culminating in a 22-yard run by running back Mercury Morris, followed by an extra point by Yepremian. Miami increased their lead further early in the second quarter with a pair of Yepremian field goals from 17 yards and 16 yards. Shortly thereafter, Dolphins quarterback Earl Morrall was intercepted by Bills safety Tony Greene and returned for a touchdown, narrowing Miami's lead to 16–13. This would be the final score of the first half, as Miami halted another scoring attempt by Buffalo when cornerback Tim Foley intercepted Shaw at Miami's 20-yard line.

Miami increased their lead again in the third quarter with a seven-yard pass from Morrall to tight end Marv Fleming. The antecedent drive included several long runs and an unsportsmanlike conduct penalty against the Bills. Later in the third quarter, Leypoldt kicked a 28-yard field goal, cutting their deficit to 23–16 at the end of the period. However, in the fourth quarter, the Dolphins put together another scoring drive that included a 26-yard pass from Morrall to Morris and then four-yard rush by Morris for the touchdown. With neither team able to accumulate more points after that drive, the game ended as a 30–16 win for the Dolphins. Of note, Morris surpassed 100 rushing yards in a game for only the second time in his professional football career.

==== Week 9: vs. New England Patriots ====
Week 9: New England Patriots at Miami Dolphins – Game summary

Quarter	1	2	3	4	Total
Patriots	0	0	0	0	**0**
**Dolphins**	17	14	7	14	**52**

at Miami Orange Bowl, Miami, Florida

- Date: November 12
- Game time: 1:00 p.m. EST
- Game weather: 78 °F (26 °C)
- Referee: Fred Silva
- TV announcers (NBC): Jay Randolph and Dave Kocourek
- Box score

Game information

**First quarter**

- MIA – Mercury Morris 4-yard run (Garo Yepremian kick). Dolphins 7–0.
- MIA – Mercury Morris 4-yard run (Garo Yepremian kick). Dolphins 14–0.
- MIA – Garo Yepremian 16-yard field goal. Dolphins 17–0.

**Second quarter**

- MIA – Larry Csonka 3-yard run (Garo Yepremian kick). Dolphins 24–0.
- MIA – Mercury Morris 6-yard run (Garo Yepremian kick). Dolphins 31–0.

**Third quarter**

- MIA – Marlin Briscoe 16-yard pass from Earl Morrall (Garo Yepremian kick). Dolphins 38–0.

**Fourth quarter**

- MIA – Marlin Briscoe 51-yard pass from Jim Del Gaizo (Garo Yepremian kick). Dolphins 45–0.
- MIA – Jim Mandich 39-yard pass from Jim Del Gaizo (Garo Yepremian kick). Dolphins 52–0.

**Top passers**

- NE – Jim Plunkett – 7/19, 66 yards, 2 INT
- MIA – Earl Morrall – 7/13, 162 yards, TD

**Top rushers**

- NE – Carl Garrett – 10 rushes, 44 yards
- MIA – Mercury Morris – 16 rushes, 90 yards, 3 TD

**Top receivers**

- NE – Bob Gladieux – 2 receptions, 26 yards
- MIA – Marlin Briscoe – 4 receptions, 128 yards, 2 TD

Following their win against the Buffalo Bills, the Dolphins hosted the New England Patriots at the Orange Bowl for week 9. Miami annihilated New England both offensively and defensively. On the third play of the game, Dolphins safety Dick Anderson intercepted Patriots quarterback Jim Plunkett at New England's 26-yard line. Anderson returned the ball to the New England four-yard line before fumbling. Although it appeared that the Patriots may have recovered the fumble, the officiating crew ruled that they did not. Dolphins running back Mercury Morris then scored a touchdown on a four-yard rush. On just the fifth offensive play for the Dolphins, Morris again scored a 4-yard rushing touchdown. Miami scored on every possession they had during the first half, leading the Patriots 31–0 at intermission.

In the third quarter, Morrall threw a 16-yard pass to Marlin Briscoe, increasing the Dolphins lead to 38–0. By the beginning of the fourth quarter, with little doubt about which team would win, Dolphins quarterback Jim Del Gazio replaced Morrall. Del Gazio threw two touchdown passes in the final quarter – a 51-yard pass to Briscoe and a 39-yard pass to Jim Mandich. The Dolphins did not allow the Patriots to score throughout the game.

The final score of 52–0 in favor of Miami remains the most lopsided win for either team in the history of the Dolphins–Patriots rivalry. Miami totaled 482 yards, far higher than New England's 169 yards. Morrall passed for 162 yards, while Del Gazio passed for 145. The Dolphins defense limited the Patriots to just 77 net passing yards and 92 rushing yards, including four sacks against Plunkett for a loss of 40 yards. Morris, the leading rusher of the game, accumulated 90 rushing yards and 35 receiving yards; he scored 3 rushing touchdowns. With the victory, the Dolphins improved to 9–0. Don Shula became the 9th head coach in NFL history to win at least 100 regular season games, but the first to do so in only 10 seasons.

==== Week 10: vs. New York Jets ====
Week 10: New York Jets at Miami Dolphins – Game summary

Quarter	1	2	3	4	Total
Jets	7	10	7	0	**24**
**Dolphins**	7	7	7	7	**28**

at Miami Orange Bowl, Miami, Florida

- Date: November 19
- Game time: 1:00 p.m. EST
- Game weather: 75 °F (24 °C)
- Referee: Norm Schachter
- TV announcers (NBC): Curt Gowdy and Al DeRogatis
- Box score

Game information

**First quarter**

- MIA – Howard Twilley 9-yard pass from Earl Morrall (Garo Yepremian kick). Dolphins 7–0.
- NYJ – John Riggins 1-yard run (Bobby Howfield kick). Tied 7–7.

**Second quarter**

- NYJ – Rich Caster 29-yard pass from Joe Namath (Bobby Howfield kick). Jets 14–7.
- NYJ – Bobby Howfield 33-yard field goal. Jets 17–7.
- MIA – Mercury Morris 1-yard run (Garo Yepremian kick). Jets 17–14.

**Third quarter**

- MIA – Earl Morrall 31-yard run (Garo Yepremian kick). Dolphins 21–17.
- NYJ – Wayne Stewart 4-yard pass from Joe Namath (Bobby Howfield kick). Jets 24–21.

**Fourth quarter**

- MIA – Mercury Morris 14-yard run (Garo Yepremian kick). Dolphins 28–24.

**Top passers**

- NYJ – Joe Namath – 14/23, 175 yards, 2 TD, 2 INT
- MIA – Earl Morrall – 8/17, 132 yards, TD, INT

**Top rushers**

- NYJ – John Riggins – 18 rushes, 83 yards, TD
- MIA – Mercury Morris – 23 rushes, 107 yards, 2 TD

**Top receivers**

- NYJ – Rich Caster – 3 receptions, 52 yards, TD
- MIA – Howard Twilley – 3 receptions, 75 yards, TD

The Dolphins then returned home in week 10 for their second matchup against the Jets. Near the beginning of the first quarter, Dolphins safety Dick Anderson intercepted Jets quarterback Joe Namath's first pass of that game. After seven more plays, Miami scored on a nine-yard pass from quarterback Earl Morrall to wide receiver Howard Twilley. New York responded with an 80-yard drive that included several short passes from Namath, before eventually ending with a one-yard rushing touchdown by fullback John Riggins. In the game's second quarter, Morrall fumbled on a lateral pass, with the ball being recovered by cornerback Earlie Thomas of the Jets at the Dolphins 38-yard line. Within a few plays, the Jets scored another touchdown via a 28-yard pass from Namath to wide receiver Rich Caster. New York increased their lead on Miami to 17–7 after Bobby Howfield kicked a 33-yard field goal. However, the Dolphins cut the Jets lead to 17–14 just before halftime on a drive that ended with a one-yard run by running back Mercury Morris.

Early in the third quarter, Morrall rushed for 31 yards for a touchdown. Miami then led New York by 21–17. The Jets reclaimed the lead later in the third quarter on a drive that ended with a four-yard pass from Namath to tight end Wayne Stewart. However, in the game's final quarter, Anderson landed on the ball after Jets running back Cliff McClain fumbled it at New York's 27-yard line. On the fourth play after the fumble, Morris managed to run 14 yards to the end zone. Miami would ultimately win the game by a score of 28–24 and improve to 10–0. With the victory, the Dolphins also clinched the AFC East title.

==== Week 11: vs. St. Louis Cardinals ====
Week 11: St. Louis Cardinals at Miami Dolphins – Game summary

Quarter	1	2	3	4	Total
Cardinals	0	3	0	7	**10**
**Dolphins**	7	3	14	7	**31**

at Miami Orange Bowl, Miami, Florida

- Date: November 27
- Game time: 9:00 p.m. EST
- Game weather: 66 °F (19 °C)
- Referee: Bernie Ulman
- TV announcers (ABC): Frank Gifford, Don Meredith, and Howard Cosell
- Box score

Game information

**First quarter**

- MIA – Jim Kiick 2-yard run (Garo Yepremian kick). Dolphins 7–0.

**Second quarter**

- STL – Jim Bakken 49-yard field goal. Dolphins 7–3.
- MIA – Garo Yepremian 25-yard field goal. Dolphins 10–3.

**Third quarter**

- MIA – Otto Stowe 37-yard pass from Earl Morrall (Garo Yepremian kick). Dolphins 17–3.
- MIA – Lloyd Mumphord 28-yard interception return (Garo Yepremian kick). Dolphins 24–3.

**Fourth quarter**

- STL – Leon Burns 2-yard run (Jim Bakken kick). Dolphins 24–10.
- MIA – Otto Stowe 27-yard pass from Earl Morrall (Garo Yepremian kick). Dolphins 31–10.

**Top passers**

- STL – Gary Cuozzo – 6/17, 80 yards, 2 INT
- MIA – Earl Morrall – 12/19, 210 yards, 2 TD

**Top rushers**

- STL – Johnny Roland – 6 rushes, 25 yards
- MIA – Larry Csonka – 16 rushes, 114 yards

**Top receivers**

- STL – Jackie Smith – 3 receptions, 63 yards
- MIA – Otto Stowe – 6 receptions, 140 yards, 2 TD

The Dolphins remained at home at the Orange Bowl in week 11 for a Monday Night Football game against the St. Louis Cardinals. Dolphins safety Dick Anderson intercepted St. Louis quarterback Gary Cuozzo's first pass of the game at the Cardinals' 29-yard line. On the sixth play following the interception, Dolphins running back Jim Kiick reached the end zone on a two-yard run. Miami led St. Louis 7–0 following the first quarter. Both teams scored a field goal in the second quarter, from 49 yards and 25 yards by Jim Bakken of the Cardinals and Garo Yepremian of the Dolphins, respectively. At half time, Miami led St. Louis by a score of 10–3.

The Dolphins would widen their lead by two touchdowns in the third quarter. First, Miami scored on a 37-yard pass from quarterback Earl Morrall to wide receiver Otto Stowe. Later in the quarter, Dolphins cornerback Lloyd Mumphord intercepted Cardinals quarterback Jim Hart and returned the ball for a touchdown. Miami now led by 24–3 after the third quarter. St. Louis finally responded again in the fourth quarter via a two-yard rush by running back Leon Burns. However, the Dolphins then scored another touchdown on a drive capped off by a 27-yard pass from Morrall to Stowe. Miami won the game by a score of 31–10.

==== Week 12: at New England Patriots ====
Week 12: Miami Dolphins at New England Patriots – Game summary

Quarter	1	2	3	4	Total
**Dolphins**	3	10	17	7	**37**
Patriots	0	7	0	14	**21**

at Schaefer Stadium, Foxboro, Massachusetts

- Date: December 3
- Game time: 1:00 p.m. EST
- Game weather: 44 °F (7 °C)
- Referee: Jack Reader
- TV announcers (NBC): Jim Simpson and Kyle Rote
- Box score

Game information

**First quarter**

- MIA – Garo Yepremian 36-yard field goal. Dolphins 3–0.

**Second quarter**

- MIA – Garo Yepremian 10-yard field goal. Dolphins 6–0.
- MIA – Jim Kiick 1-yard run (Garo Yepremian kick). Dolphins 13–0.
- NE – Tom Reynolds 36-yard pass from Jim Plunkett (Mike Walker kick). Dolphins 13–7.

**Third quarter**

- MIA – Jim Mandich 3-yard pass from Earl Morrall (Garo Yepremian kick). Dolphins 20–7.
- MIA – Garo Yepremian 18-yard field goal. Dolphins 23–7.
- MIA – Marlin Briscoe 14-yard pass from Earl Morrall (Garo Yepremian kick). Dolphins 30–7.

**Fourth quarter**

- MIA – Hubert Ginn 8-yard run (Garo Yepremian kick). Dolphins 37–7.
- NE – John Tarver 8-yard pass from Brian Dowling (Mike Walker kick). Dolphins 37–14.
- NE – Brian Dowling 1-yard run (Mike Walker kick). Dolphins 37–21.

**Top passers**

- MIA – Earl Morrall – 11/19, 201 yards, 2 TD, INT
- NE – Jim Plunkett – 9/18, 95 yards, TD, 2 INT

**Top rushers**

- MIA – Mercury Morris – 15 rushes, 113 yards
- NE – Josh Ashton – 7 rushes, 60 yards

**Top receivers**

- MIA – Paul Warfield – 3 receptions, 89 yards
- NE – Bob Windsor – 6 receptions, 54 yards

In week 12, the Dolphins traveled to Schaefer Stadium for their second matchup of the season against the Patriots. The only score in the first quarter was 36-yard field goal by Miami's Garo Yepremian. The Dolphins increased their lead further in the second quarter, with a 10-yard field goal by Yepremian and a one-yard rush by running back Jim Kiick on a drive that spanned 89 yards. New England responded late in the second quarter via a 36-yard pass from quarterback Jim Plunkett to wide receiver Tom Reynolds. The Dolphins led by a score of 13–7 at halftime.

Early in the third quarter, Miami defensive Vern Den Herder intercepted a pass by Plunkett and reached New England's 11-yard line before the play ended. The Dolphins soon scored another touchdown when quarterback Earl Morrall threw a three-yard pass to tight end Jim Mandich. Later in the third quarter, Yepremian kicked a 18-yard field goal. Dolphins linebacker Doug Swift intercepted Plunkett on New England's next possession. On the fifth play following the interception, Miami scored on a 14-yard pass from Morrall to wide receiver Marlin Briscoe. Miami added another touchdown early in the fourth quarter via an eight-yard rush by running back Hubert Ginn. At this point, the Dolphins led by 37–7. The Patriots scored two touchdowns in the fourth quarter, the first being an eight-yard pass from quarterback Brian Dowling to running back John Tarver and the second being a one-yard rush by Dowling. The game ended with a 37–21 victory for the Dolphins.

With the win, the Dolphins became only the third team in NFL history to win at least 12 consecutive games, after the 1934 Chicago Bears and 1969 Minnesota Vikings. Also of note, running back Larry Csonka surpassed 1,000 rushing yards on the season during this game.

==== Week 13: at New York Giants ====
Week 13: Miami Dolphins at New York Giants – Game summary

Quarter	1	2	3	4	Total
**Dolphins**	10	7	0	6	**23**
Giants	6	7	0	0	**13**

at Yankee Stadium, New York City, New York

- Date: December 10
- Game time: 1:00 p.m. EST
- Game weather: 47 °F (8 °C)
- Referee: Fred Silva
- TV announcers (NBC): Charlie Jones and George Ratterman
- Box score

Game information

**First quarter**

- NYG – Ron Johnson 6-yard run (kick failed). Giants 6–0.
- MIA – Mercury Morris 12-yard run (Garo Yepremian kick). Dolphins 7–6.
- MIA – Garo Yepremian 37-yard field goal. Dolphins 10–6.

**Second quarter**

- MIA – Paul Warfield 34-yard pass from Earl Morrall (Garo Yepremian kick). Dolphins 17–6.
- NYG – Ron Johnson 1-yard run (Pete Gogolak kick). Dolphins 17–13.

**Third quarter**

- No scoring plays

**Fourth quarter**

- MIA – Garo Yepremian 31-yard field goal. Dolphins 20–13.
- MIA – Garo Yepremian 16-yard field goal. Dolphins 23–13.

**Top passers**

- MIA – Earl Morrall – 9/17, 171 yards, TD, INT
- NYG – Norm Snead – 15/25, 231 yards, 2 INT

**Top rushers**

- MIA – Mercury Morris – 19 rushes, 98 yards, TD
- NYG – Vince Clements – 11 rushes, 63 yards

**Top receivers**

- MIA – Paul Warfield – 4 receptions, 132 yards, TD
- NYG – Bob Tucker – 4 receptions, 89 yards

The Dolphins traveled to Yankee Stadium in New York to face the New York Giants in week 13. After Joe Orduna of the Giants returned the opening kickoff for 38 yards, New York began a five play, 50-yard drive. New York running back Ron Johnson rushed one-yard for a touchdown, which was preceded by a 34-yard pass from quarterback Norm Snead to wide receiver Don Herrmann. However, the Dolphins blocked Pete Gogolak's extra point attempt. Miami quickly responded with a 10 play, 82-yard drive capped off by a 12-yard rush by Mercury Morris for a touchdown and a successful extra point attempt by Garo Yepremian. Later in the first quarter, New York's Rocky Thompson fumbled during a kickoff return, with the ball recovered by Miami running back Charles Leigh. The Giants defense forced the Dolphins to kick a 37-yard field goal, increasing their lead to 10–6.

Miami extended their lead further in the second quarter, when wide receiver Paul Warfield caught a 34-yard pass from quarterback Earl Morrall. New York responded with another touchdown, the result of an 81-yard, 12 play drive which again ended with a one-yard run by Johnson. By the end of the first half, the Dolphins led by a score of 17–13. Neither team scored in the third quarter. In the fourth quarter, Dolphins cornerback Curtis Johnson intercepted a pass from Snead, which eventually led to Yepremian kicking a 31-yard field goal. A turnover by New York's John Mendenhall during a punt return later in the fourth quarter led to another field goal by Yepremian, this time by a distance of 16 yards. The Giants were unable to score after the second quarter, and thus, the game ended with a 23–13 victory for the Dolphins.

==== Week 14: vs. Baltimore Colts ====
Week 14: Baltimore Colts at Miami Dolphins – Game summary

Quarter	1	2	3	4	Total
Colts	0	0	0	0	**0**
**Dolphins**	3	7	3	3	**16**

at Miami Orange Bowl, Miami, Florida

- Date: December 16
- Game time: 1:00 p.m. EST
- Game weather: 69 °F (21 °C)
- Referee: Jim Tunney
- TV announcers (NBC): Curt Gowdy and Al DeRogatis
- Box score

Game information

**First quarter**

- MIA – Garo Yepremian 40-yard field goal. Dolphins 3–0.

**Second quarter**

- MIA – Paul Warfield 14-yard pass from Earl Morrall (Garo Yepremian kick). Dolphins 10–0.

**Third quarter**

- MIA – Garo Yepremian 50-yard field goal. Dolphins 13–0.

**Fourth quarter**

- MIA – Garo Yepremian 35-yard field goal. Dolphins 16–0.

**Top passers**

- BAL – Marty Domres – 11/23, 128 yards, 2 INT
- MIA – Earl Morrall – 7/15, 110 yards, TD, INT

**Top rushers**

- BAL – Lydell Mitchell – 9 rushes, 42 yards
- MIA – Mercury Morris – 26 rushes, 86 yards

**Top receivers**

- BAL – Don McCauley – 4 receptions, 46 yards
- MIA – Paul Warfield – 2 receptions, 35 yards, TD

In the final week of the regular season, the Dolphins returned home for their second matchup against the Colts. The Dolphins scored first, with a 40-yard field goal by Garo Yepremian in the first quarter. Miami extended their lead further in the second quarter, with a 14-yard pass from quarterback Earl Morrall to wide receiver Paul Warfield. After Colts quarterback Marty Domres sprained his ankle, Baltimore briefly inserted Johnny Unitas at quarterback late in the second quarter for what would be his final game as a Colt. In the second half, the Dolphins added six more points with a pair of third and fourth quarter field goals by Yepremian from 50 yards and 35 yards, respectively. Miami Dolphins quarterback Bob Griese entered the game in the fourth quarter, his first time on the field since his injury against the Chargers in week 5. With Baltimore unable to score throughout the game, Miami won 16–0.

With the Dolphins defeating the Baltimore Colts, they finished the regular season with a perfect win–loss record of 14–0. The 1972 Dolphins became the third team in the history of the NFL to complete a regular season undefeated and untied, after the 1934 and 1942 Chicago Bears, while the 1948 Cleveland Browns achieved a 14–0 record as a member of the All-America Football Conference. Later, the 2007 New England Patriots also earned an undefeated and untied regular season record.

=== Standings ===
AFC East
	W	L	T	PCT	DIV	CONF	PF	PA	STK
Miami Dolphins	14	0	0	1.000	8–0	11–0	385	171	W14
New York Jets	7	7	0	.500	6–2	6–5	367	324	L2
Baltimore Colts	5	9	0	.357	4–4	5–6	235	252	L2
Buffalo Bills	4	9	1	.321	2–6	2–9	257	377	W1
New England Patriots	3	11	0	.214	0–8	0–11	192	446	L1

== Postseason ==
Round	Date	Opponent	Result	Record	Venue	Recap
Divisional	December 24, 1972	Cleveland Browns	W 20–14	1–0	Miami Orange Bowl	Recap
AFC Championship	December 31, 1972	at Pittsburgh Steelers	W 21–17	2–0	Three Rivers Stadium	Recap
Super Bowl VII	January 14, 1973	Washington Redskins	W 14–7	3–0	Los Angeles Memorial Coliseum	Recap

=== Game summaries ===
==== AFC Divisional Playoffs: vs. Cleveland Browns ====
AFC Divisional Playoffs: Cleveland Browns at Miami Dolphins – Game summary

Quarter	1	2	3	4	Total
Browns	0	0	7	7	14
Dolphins	10	0	0	10	20

at Miami Orange Bowl, Miami, Florida

- Date: December 24
- Game time: 3:00 p.m. EST
- Game weather: 62 °F (17 °C)
- Game attendance: 78,916
- Referee: Norm Schachter
- TV announcers (NBC): Jim Simpson and Kyle Rote
- Box score

Game information

First quarter

- MIA – Charlie Babb 5-yard blocked punt return (Garo Yepremian kick). Dolphins 7–0.
- MIA – Garo Yepremian 40-yard field goal. Dolphins 10–0.

Second quarter

- No scoring plays

Third quarter

- CLE – Mike Phipps 5-yard run (Don Cockroft kick). Dolphins 10–7.

Fourth quarter

- MIA – Garo Yepremian 46-yard field goal. Dolphins 13–7.
- CLE – Fair Hooker 27-yard pass from Mike Phipps (Don Cockroft kick). Browns 14–13.
- MIA – Jim Kiick 8-yard run (Garo Yepremian kick). Dolphins 20–14.

Top passers

- CLE – Mike Phipps – 9/23, 131 yards, TD, 5 INT
- MIA – Earl Morrall – 6/13, 88 yards

Top rushers

- CLE – Bo Scott – 16 rushes, 94 yards
- MIA – Mercury Morris – 15 rushes, 72 yards

Top receivers

- CLE – Fair Hooker – 3 receptions, 53 yards, TD
- MIA – Paul Warfield – 2 receptions, 50 yards

For the first round of the playoffs, the Dolphins remained in Miami to take on the wild card Browns on December 24. The Dolphins scored first, after rookie safety Charlie Babb blocked Browns placekicker Don Cockroft's punt at the Cleveland 17-yard line and returned the ball for a touchdown. Miami added to their lead with a 40-yard field goal by Garo Yepremian near the end of the first quarter, although their offense, ranked the best in the league for the 1972 season, otherwise remained mostly stagnant in the first half. However, Cleveland failed to score in the first half, leaving Miami with a 10–0 at the intermission.

Near the beginning of the third quarter, Browns safety Thom Darden had a significant punt return of 38 yards, which ultimately set up the drive in which Browns quarterback Mike Phipps scored a rushing touchdown. Yepremian then kicked a 46-yard field goal in the opening minutes of the fourth quarter. The Browns orchestrated another touchdown drive in the fourth quarter, ending with a 27-yard pass from Phipps to Fair Hooker. Consequently, the Browns took a 14–13 lead over the Dolphins. However, in the final minutes of the game, Miami executed a six play, 80-yard drive capped by an eight-yard rush by running back Jim Kiick. Throughout the contest, Browns quarterback Phipps was intercepted five times by the Dolphins defense. Miami won by a score of 20–14.

==== AFC Championship: at Pittsburgh Steelers ====
AFC Championship: Miami Dolphins at Pittsburgh Steelers – Game summary

Quarter	1	2	3	4	Total
Dolphins	0	7	7	7	21
Steelers	7	0	3	7	17

at Three Rivers Stadium, Pittsburgh, Pennsylvania

- Date: December 31
- Game time: 12:00 p.m. EST
- Game weather: 58 °F (14 °C)
- Game attendance: 50,845
- Referee: Ben Dreith
- TV announcers (NBC): Curt Gowdy and Al DeRogatis
- Box score

Game information

First quarter

- PIT – Gerry Mullins 0-yard fumble return (Roy Gerela kick). Steelers 7–0.

Second quarter

- MIA – Larry Csonka 9-yard pass from Earl Morrall (Garo Yepremian kick). Tied 7–7.

Third quarter

- PIT – Roy Gerela 14-yard field goal. Steelers 10–7.
- MIA – Jim Kiick 2-yard run (Garo Yepremian kick). Dolphins 14–10.

Fourth quarter

- MIA – Jim Kiick 3-yard run (Garo Yepremian kick). Dolphins 21–10.
- PIT – Al Young 12-yard pass from Terry Bradshaw (Roy Gerela kick). Dolphins 21–17.

Top passers

- MIA – Bob Griese – 3/5, 70 yards
- PIT – Terry Bradshaw – 5/10, 80 yards, TD, 2 INT

Top rushers

- MIA – Mercury Morris – 16 rushes, 76 yards
- PIT – Franco Harris – 16 rushes, 76 yards

Top receivers

- MIA – Paul Warfield – 2 receptions, 63 yards
- PIT – Al Young – 4 receptions, 54 yards, TD

Because home teams in the playoffs were decided based on a yearly rotation prior to the 1975 postseason, the Dolphins traveled to Pittsburgh for the AFC Championship Game on December 31 despite being undefeated. The Steelers, who defeated the Raiders in the previous round via the Immaculate Reception, jumped to an early 7–0 lead when Steelers guard Gerry Mullins recovered Terry Bradshaw's fumble in the end zone. In the second quarter, the Steelers defense put the Dolphins in a 4th-and-5 situation at the Pittsburgh 49-yard line. However, Miami instead executed a fake punt in which Larry Seiple ran for 37 yards. Miami then tied the game after Morrall threw a nine-yard pass to Csonka.

The Steelers retook the lead, 10–7, early in the third quarter when Roy Gerela kicked a 14-yard field goal. Shortly thereafter, Don Shula replaced Morrall with Griese at quarterback. Miami then went on an 80-yard touchdown drive, which featured a 52-yard pass to Paul Warfield and ended with a two-yard rush by Kiick. After Maulty Moore blocked another Gerela field goal attempt, the Dolphins increased their lead to 21–10 following a 49-yard drive capped by another rush by Kiick, this time by 3 yards. The Steelers responded with a touchdown drive of their own, ending with a 12-yard pass from Bradshaw to Al Young. Although this narrowed the Dolphins lead to 21–17, the Steelers did not score again as the Dolphins intercepted Bradshaw twice in the final minutes of the game. Consequently, Miami remained undefeated and advanced to Super Bowl VII.

==== Super Bowl VII: vs. Washington Redskins ====
Super Bowl VII: Miami Dolphins vs. Washington Redskins – Game summary

Quarter	1	2	3	4	Total
Dolphins	7	7	0	0	14
Redskins	0	0	0	7	7

at Los Angeles Memorial Coliseum, Los Angeles, California

- Date: January 14, 1973
- Game time: 3:50 p.m. EST/12:50 PST
- Game weather: Sunny and hazy, 84 °F (29 °C)
- Game attendance: 90,182
- Referee: Tommy Bell
- TV announcers (NBC): Curt Gowdy, Al DeRogatis, and Bill Enis
- Box score

Game information

First quarter

- MIA – Howard Twilley 28-yard pass from Bob Griese (Garo Yepremian kick), 0:01. Dolphins 7–0. Drive: 6 plays, 63 yards, 2:54.

Second quarter

- MIA – Jim Kiick 1-yard run (Garo Yepremian kick), 0:18. Dolphins 14–0. Drive: 5 plays, 27 yards, 1:33.

Third quarter

- No scoring plays

Fourth quarter

- WAS – Mike Bass 49-yard fumble return (Curt Knight kick), 2:07. Dolphins 14–7.

Top passers

- MIA – Bob Griese – 8/11, 88 yards, TD, INT
- WAS – Billy Kilmer – 14/28, 104 yards, 3 INT

Top rushers

- MIA – Larry Csonka – 15 rushes, 112 yards
- WAS – Larry Brown – 22 rushes, 72 yards

Top receivers

- MIA – Paul Warfield – 3 receptions, 36 yards
- WAS – Roy Jefferson – 5 receptions, 50 yards

The Dolphins advanced to their second consecutive Super Bowl appearance, this time against the Washington Redskins at the Los Angeles Memorial Coliseum on January 14, 1973. Washington was favored by 1 point, despite Miami entering the game undefeated and the Redskins having three regular season losses.

Super Bowl VII quickly became a defensive battle between both teams, with the Dolphins and Redskins each starting with two drives that ended with punts. However, in the waning minutes of the first quarter, Miami engineered a scoring drive capped by a 28-yard touchdown pass from Griese to Twilley. On Washington's subsequent drive, Jake Scott intercepted Billy Kilmer's pass. But the Dolphins failed to capitalize and both teams exchanged punts, while Kilmer threw another interception to Nick Buoniconti, who then returned the ball for 32 yards, with two minutes remaining in the half. Miami took advantage this time and scored on a one-yard rush by Kiick. The Dolphins held a 14–0 lead at halftime.

On the opening drive of the third quarter, the Redskins advanced as far as the Dolphins 17-yard line, before Manny Fernandez sacked Kilmer on third down for a loss of eight yards. Curt Knight's subsequent field goal attempt of 32 yards missed. The game then continued to be a defensive battle between the two teams. Both teams then exchanged punts again, while Griese was intercepted by Brig Owens late in the third quarter. Just over halfway through the fourth quarter, the Redskins again drove far into Dolphins territory. However, Scott intercepted another pass from Kilmer. Subsequently, Miami's next drive stalled at Washington's 34-yard line. Redskins defensive lineman Bill Brundige blocked Yepremian's 42-yard field goal attempt. Yepremian then tried to throw a pass, but the ball was instead caught by Washington cornerback Mike Bass, who ran the other way to cut the Dolphins lead to 14–7. This play is sometimes referred to as "Garo's Gaffe". Both teams each had one more drive, but neither of them resulted in a score. Thus, Dolphins won Super Bowl VII by a score of 14–7.

== Awards and honors ==
- Coach of the Year – Don Shula
- Comeback Player of the Year – Earl Morrall
- Super Bowl Most Valuable Player – Jake Scott

== Urban legend ==
There is an urban legend that every season, whenever the last remaining undefeated NFL team loses its first game, all the surviving members of the 1972 Miami Dolphins open bottles of champagne in celebration. Coach Don Shula tried to play down the myth by saying that two players, Dick Anderson and Nick Buoniconti, who live near each other, sometimes have a toast together. However, they occasionally had Diet Cokes together, such as in 2005 when Bob Griese and Shula watched the Chargers win over the Colts, the last undefeated team that season.

The NFL capitalized on the legend during a commercial that aired during Super Bowl LIII commemorating the 100th year of the NFL. The commercial featured "44 of the greatest NFL athletes" at a formal dinner event with the attendees dressed in black tie. Cacophony breaks out, and three members of the 1972 Dolphins, Larry Little, Paul Warfield, Larry Csonka, are shown casually sitting at a table together uniquely dressed in aqua-colored formal coats, and all three are drinking champagne, laughing at the chaos happening around them.

== The perfect season ==
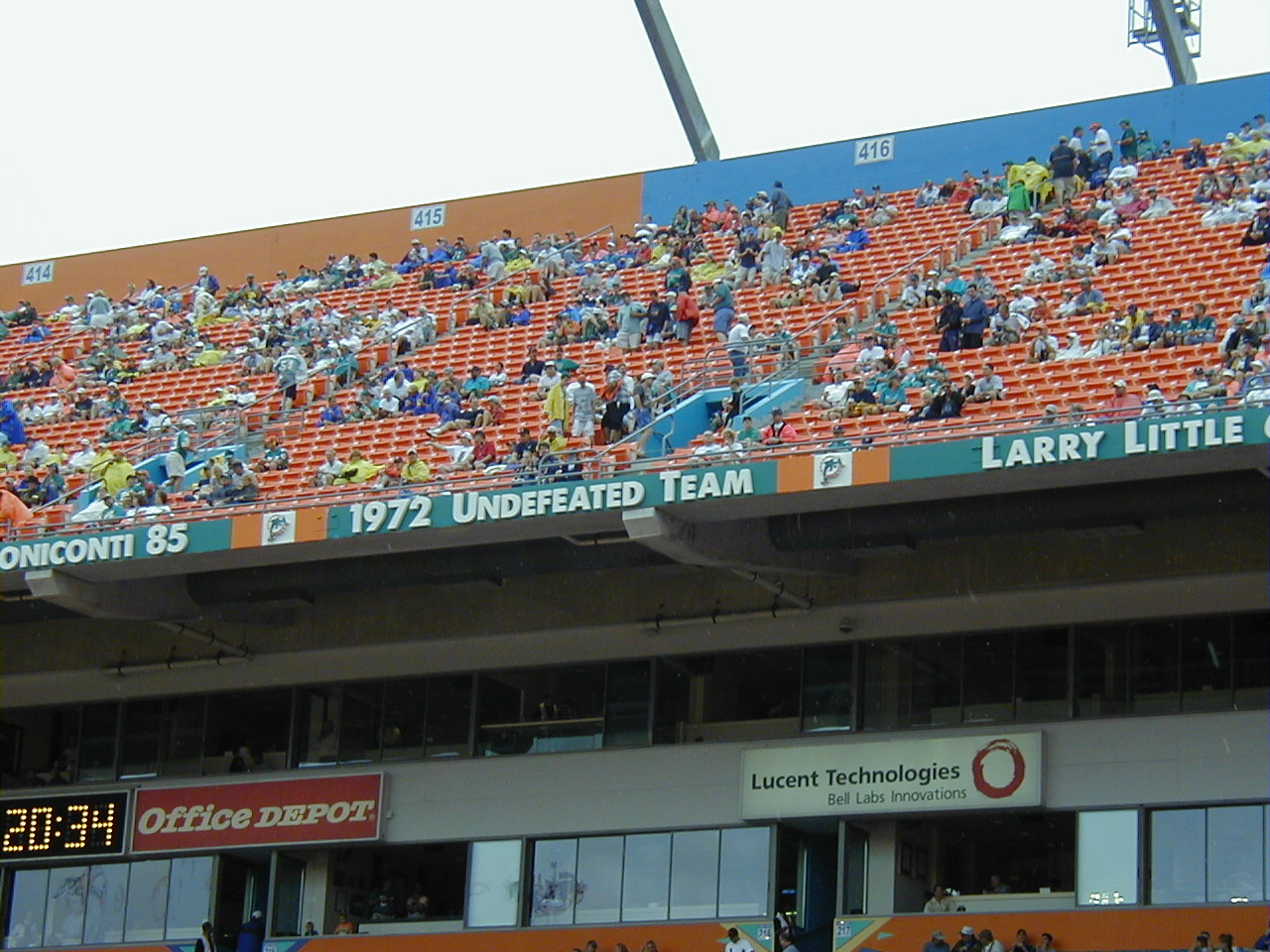
The 1972 team on the Miami Dolphins Honor Roll

The 1972 Miami Dolphins were the first team to execute a perfect regular season in the post-merger NFL. They are the only team in NFL history to go undefeated and untied in the regular season and postseason.

After their loss to the Dallas Cowboys in Super Bowl VI (Miami's only loss during calendar year 1972), Don Shula had vowed to not only reach the Super Bowl again but to win it. He forced the team to watch film of the loss twice while at training camp. Shula would later go on to say:

I think that's when we all came together for what was going happen for the next two years. What I stressed in the locker room was that we wanted to make sure this wouldn't happen again. Our goal was not to go to the Super Bowl but to win it.

An enduring controversy is based on the argument that the 1972 Dolphins played a soft schedule not possible under the current scheduling formula. Prior to the implementation of position scheduling in 1978, opponents were set by the NFL on a rotating basis. The Dolphins' 1972 regular-season opponents posted an aggregate winning percentage of .397, and only two had winning records for that season (both the Kansas City Chiefs and New York Giants finished 8–6). However, this does not constitute any record; the 1975 Minnesota Vikings, who began 10–0 and finished 12–2, played 14 opponents with an average winning percentage of .332, and nine of their games were against teams 4–10 or worse. Also in finishing 14-0, the Dolphins outscored opponents an aggregate 385-171, but this was not as one-sided as the 1968 Baltimore Colts, whom Shula had coached and Morrall had played for, and who scored more points (402) and gave up fewer (144). The 1969 Vikings also had a greater point differential of 246 points. Both the Colts and Vikings went to the Super Bowl, but lost.

The Dolphins were beneficiaries of a weak AFC East that saw the Colts lapse from a perennial contender into a three-year stretch in which they would win only 11 games; a Bills team yet to find its legs with O. J. Simpson and the return of coach Lou Saban; a dysfunctional Patriots organization that had little to no talent to surround former No. 1 overall draft choice Jim Plunkett; and a Jets squad with a porous defense, offsetting the benefits of Joe Namath remaining healthy throughout the season and an emerging John Riggins in the running game. Miami also caught a scheduling break by facing an Oilers team that was in the midst of back-to-back 1–13 seasons, a Chargers team beginning a run of four consecutive seasons in the AFC West cellar, and a Cardinals team that appeared to lack direction by rotating its starting quarterbacks instead of giving the job full-time to Jim Hart. The Dolphins also caught the Vikings in the midst of a massive transformation following the return of Fran Tarkenton, missing the playoffs for the only time between 1968 and 1978, finishing 7–7.

The NFL's rules at the time forced the undefeated Dolphins (14–0) to play the Steelers (11–3) in Pittsburgh for the AFC Championship Game. Subsequent rule changes have since changed the playoff structure so that this would never happen again. Since the 1975 season, teams that have won their division and have had a superior record than their opponent (as was the case with the 1972 Dolphins when they faced the Steelers) would play their postseason games at home.

The 1972 Dolphins consisted mostly of the same core of players that it possessed from 1970 through 1974 and was the most dominant NFL team during that stretch. In those five seasons, the Dolphins reached the playoffs all five years, won three AFC Championships, two Super Bowls and went undefeated and untied while winning the Super Bowl in 1972. They posted a record of 65–15–1, and were also the fastest franchise to win a Super Bowl after franchise inception and joining the NFL (seven years after starting in the AFL, three years after becoming a member of the NFL).

== Television coverage ==
Fans in the Miami area could not view the team's home games on television, as 1972 was the final year in which all NFL home games were blacked out on local television even if the stadium had sold out. To view the team's home games, Dolphins fans in the Miami-Dade area (as well as Broward and Palm Beach counties) would have to attend home games in person or travel to outside markets such as Orlando, Tampa, Gainesville and Jacksonville to watch the games on television.

CBS did not televise a Dolphins game in 1972. Miami's only home game vs. an NFC opponent (vs. the Cardinals) was selected for ABC's Monday Night Football, and was the team's only Monday night game. NBC was the network for all other Dolphins games.

Super Bowl VII was the first game to be televised in the market of origin under new rules that would come into effect the following season requiring games to be sold out within 72 hours of kickoff time to be aired in the market of origin (these blackout rules were lifted in 2015). As all Super Bowls (except Super Bowl I) have sold out, none have been blacked out since.

== 2013 White House visit ==
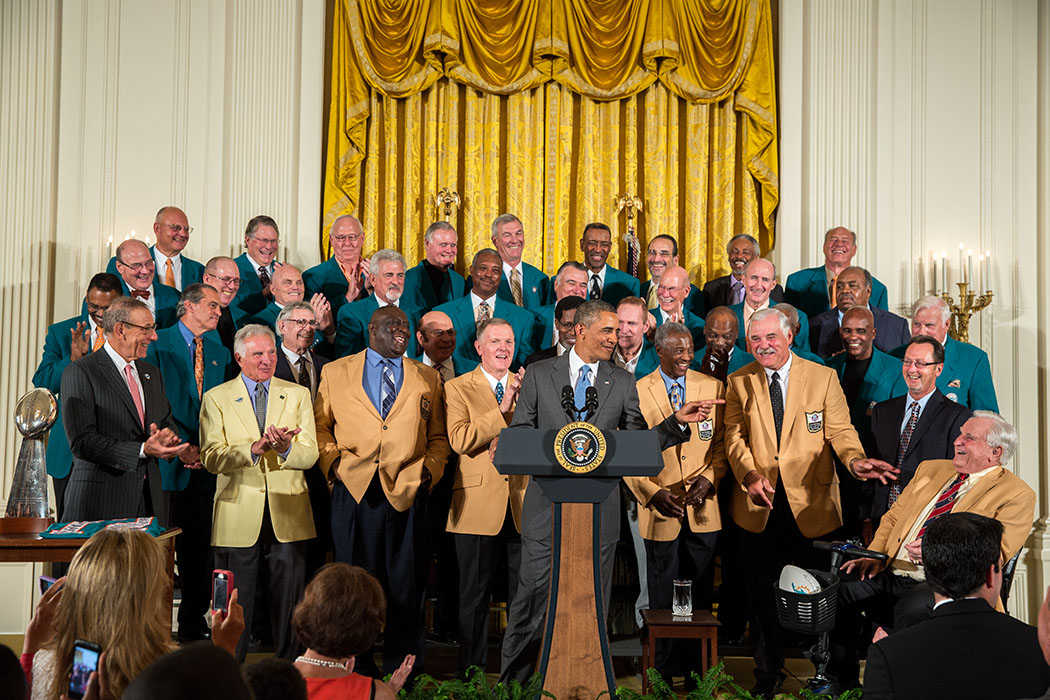
President Obama honoring the 1972 team at the White House in 2013

Four decades later, on August 20, 2013, the team was invited by President Barack Obama to visit the White House. Obama noted that the team "never got their White House visit." Asked why the team had not been invited by President Richard Nixon in 1973, Larry Csonka stated that he did not feel neglected as it had not been a regular occurrence at the time. However, MSNBC reported that this was a deliberate snub by Nixon, who was a Redskins fan, even though Nixon owned a vacation home in nearby Key Biscayne, Florida and telephoned Shula only hours after the Dolphins defeated the Colts in the 1971 AFC Championship game to suggest a play for Miami to use in Super Bowl VI (a down-and-out pass to Warfield that was broken up by Cowboys safety Cornell Green). Obama had previously invited the 1985 Bears to the White House, as their original visit had been canceled because of the Space Shuttle Challenger disaster. Obama, a Chicago resident and Bears fan, had called the 1985 Bears the greatest team ever, but during the Dolphins' visit, he called his own words into question, also noting that the 1985 Bears' only defeat came at the hands of the 1985 Dolphins. Bob Kuechenberg, Jim Langer, and Manny Fernandez all refused to attend because of their political differences with the Obama administration.
