= 1975 Miami Dolphins season =

10th season in franchise history

- Owner: Joe Robbie
- Head coach: Don Shula
- Home stadium: Orange Bowl

Results
- Record: 10–4
- Division place: 2nd AFC East
- Playoffs: Did not qualify
- Pro Bowlers: 3 C Jim Langer; FS Jake Scott; G Bob Kuechenberg

The 1975 Miami Dolphins season was the franchise's tenth season in existence, and its sixth in the National Football League (NFL) since the AFL-NFL merger.

== Season summary ==
The Oakland Raiders ended the Dolphins' 30-game winning streak at the Orange Bowl in the season opener on Monday Night Football.

Although Miami tied for the AFC Eastern division title at 10–4 with the Baltimore Colts, the Colts won the divisional tiebreaker in 1975 with a sweep of both inter-division matchups, beating Miami 33–17 in week 10 and 10–7 in week 13. The sole wild card in the conference was Cincinnati at 11–3, so the Dolphins missed the playoffs for the first time since the merger.

The 1975 Dolphins were without running backs Larry Csonka and Jim Kiick and wide receiver Paul Warfield, who each signed three-year contracts with the Memphis Southmen in March 1974 to play in the World Football League, beginning in 1975. The second-year league folded in the season's twelfth week, and the trio returned to the NFL in 1976 with other teams (Csonka with the Giants, Kiick with the Broncos and Warfield with the Browns, where he played from 1964-69 before being traded to Miami).

== Offseason ==
=== NFL draft ===
1975 Miami Dolphins draft
Round	Pick	Player	Position	College	Notes
1	23	Darryl Carlton	Tackle	Tampa	
2	36	Freddie Solomon	Wide receiver	Tampa	
2	49	Stan Winfrey	Running back	Arkansas State	
3	75	Gerald Hill	Linebacker	Houston	
4	100	Bruce Elia	Linebacker	Ohio State	
5	106	Morris Owens	Wide receiver	Arizona State	
5	127	Barry Hill	Defensive back	Iowa State	
6	143	Steve Towle	Linebacker	Kansas	
7	179	Phillip Kent	Running back	Baylor	
8	205	Barney Crawford	Defensive tackle	Harding	
9	231	James Wilson	Guard	Clark Atlanta	
10	239	Clyde Russell	Running back	Oklahoma	
10	256	Joe Jackson	Tight end	Penn State	
10	257	Joe Danelo	Kicker	Washington State	
11	283	John Dilworth	Defensive back	Northwestern State	
12	309	Joe Yancey	Tackle	Henderson State	
13	334	Leonard Isabell	Wide receiver	Tulsa	
14	338	James Lewis	Defensive back	Tennessee State	
14	361	John Graham	Quarterback	Colorado State	
15	387	Skip Johns	Running back	Carson–Newman	
16	413	Vernon Smith	Center	Georgia	
17	439	Dwaine Copeland	Running back	Middle Tennessee State	
Made roster

=== Notable undrafted player ===
1975 Miami Dolphins draft
Round	Pick	Player	Position	College	Notes
—	—	Earnie Rhone	Linebacker	Henderson State	
Made roster

== Personnel ==
=== Coaches / Staff ===
1975 Miami Dolphins staff
Front office: President – Joe Robbie; Vice President – Don Shula; Director of Player Personnel – Bobby Beathard; Head coaches: Head coach – Don Shula; Offensive coaches: Offense/Receivers/Passing Game – Howard Schnellenberger; Offense/Offensive Line/Run Offense – Monte Clark; Offensive Backs – Carl Taseff	Defensive coaches: Defensive Line/Run Defense – Mike Scarry; Linebackers/Pass Defense – Don Doll; Defensive Backs – Tom Keane; Special teams coaches: Kickers – Carl Taseff

=== Roster ===
1975 Miami Dolphins roster
Quarterbacks (QB): 11 Jim Del Gaizo; 15 Earl Morrall; 10 Don Strock; Running backs (RB): 31 Norm Bulaich; 28 Hubert Ginn; 32 Benny Malone; 22 Mercury Morris; 36 Don Nottingham; 33 Stan Winfrey; Wide receivers (WR): 89 Nat Moore; 86 Freddie Solomon; 82 Cotton Speyrer; 81 Howard Twilley; Tight ends (TE): 88 Jim Mandich; 87 Andre Tillman	Offensive linemen (OL): 71 Darryl Carlton T; 78 Tom Drougas T; 73 Norm Evans T; 67 Bob Kuechenberg G; 62 Jim Langer C; 66 Larry Little G; 79 Wayne Moore T; 64 Ed Newman G; Defensive linemen (DL): 70 John Andrews DT/DE; 74 Randy Crowder DT; 83 Vern Den Herder DE; 75 Manny Fernandez DT; 76 Don Reese DT; 84 Bill Stanfill DE	Linebackers (LB): 51 Rodrigo Barnes OLB; 50 Bruce Elia MLB; 53 Bob Matheson OLB; 55 Earnie Rhone OLB; 59 Doug Swift OLB; 56 Steve Towle MLB; Defensive backs (DB): 49 Charlie Babb SS; 25 Tim Foley CB; 44 Barry Hill FS; 45 Curtis Johnson CB; 13 Jake Scott FS; 41 Jeris White CB; Special teams (ST): 20 Larry Seiple P; 1 Garo Yepremian K	Reserve: 40 Dick Anderson S (IR); 85 Nick Buoniconti LB (IR); 12 Bob Griese QB (IR); 72 Bob Heinz DT (IR); 57 Mike Kolen LB (IR); 80 Jim McFarland TE (IR); 82 Morris Owens WR (IR); Rookies in italics

== Regular season ==
=== Schedule ===
Week	Date	Opponent	Result	Record	Venue	Recap
1	September 22	Oakland Raiders	**L** 21–31	0–1	Miami Orange Bowl	Recap
2	September 28	at **New England Patriots**	**W** 22–14	1–1	Schaefer Stadium	Recap
3	October 5	at Green Bay Packers	**W** 31–7	2–1	Lambeau Field	Recap
4	October 12	Philadelphia Eagles	**W** 24–16	3–1	Miami Orange Bowl	Recap
5	October 19	at **New York Jets**	**W** 43–0	4–1	Shea Stadium	Recap
6	October 26	at **Buffalo Bills**	**W** 35–30	5–1	Rich Stadium	Recap
7	November 2	at Chicago Bears	**W** 46–13	6–1	Soldier Field	Recap
8	November 9	**New York Jets**	**W** 27–7	7–1	Miami Orange Bowl	Recap
9	November 16	at Houston Oilers	**L** 19–20	7–2	Astrodome	Recap
10	November 23	**Baltimore Colts**	**L** 17–33	7–3	Miami Orange Bowl	Recap
11	December 1	**New England Patriots**	**W** 20–7	8–3	Miami Orange Bowl	Recap
12	December 7	**Buffalo Bills**	**W** 31–21	9–3	Miami Orange Bowl	Recap
13	December 14	at **Baltimore Colts**	**L** 7–10 (OT)	9–4	Memorial Stadium	Recap
14	December 20	Denver Broncos	**W** 14–13	10–4	Miami Orange Bowl	Recap
Note: Intra-division opponents are in **bold** text.

=== Standings ===
AFC East
	W	L	T	PCT	DIV	CONF	PF	PA	STK
Baltimore Colts^{(3)}	10	4	0	.714	6–2	8–3	395	269	W9
Miami Dolphins	10	4	0	.714	6–2	7–4	357	222	W1
Buffalo Bills	8	6	0	.571	5–3	7–4	420	355	L1
New York Jets	3	11	0	.214	2–6	3–8	258	433	L2
New England Patriots	3	11	0	.214	1–7	2–9	258	358	L6
