= 1970 Miami Dolphins season =

5th season in franchise history; first in the National Football League

- Head coach: Don Shula
- Home stadium: Miami Orange Bowl

Results
- Record: 10–4
- Division place: 2nd AFC East
- Playoffs: Lost Divisional Playoffs (at Raiders) 14–21
- Pro Bowlers: 3 QB Bob Griese; WR Paul Warfield; FB Larry Csonka

The 1970 Miami Dolphins season was the team's fifth, and first in the National Football League (NFL). It was the team's first winning season, first playoff appearance, and first of 26 seasons under head coach Don Shula. The team improved on their 3–10–1 record from 1969, and finished the regular season at 10–4, second in the newly aligned AFC East to only the Baltimore Colts, the eventual Super Bowl champion. During this season, the Dolphins defeated the New York Jets and the Oakland Raiders for the first time in franchise history.

The Dolphins got off to a fresh start at 4–1, lost three straight to even their record at 4–4, then won six straight to end the season to clinch their first-ever winning season and playoff berth, as the wild card team. They met the Oakland Raiders in the opening divisional round, whom they had defeated in Miami in early October, but lost 21–14 on the road in the sun and mud.

Shula had moved over to the Dolphins on February 18, after seven seasons as head coach of the Baltimore Colts, now in the same division.

== Offseason ==
=== NFL draft ===
1970 Miami Dolphins draft
Round	Pick	Player	Position	College	Notes
2	29	Jim Mandich	Tight end	Michigan	
3	55	Tim Foley *	Defensive back	Purdue	
4	81	Curtis Johnson	Cornerback	Toledo	
6	132	Dave Campbell	Defensive end	Auburn	
7	159	Jake Scott *	Safety	Georgia	
8	185	Narvel Chavers	Running back	Jackson State	
9	211	Hubert Ginn	Running back	Florida A&M	
10	237	Dick Nittenger	Guard	Tampa	
11	263	Brownie Wheless	Tackle	Rice	
12	289	Mike Kolen	Linebacker	Auburn	
13	315	Dave Buddington	Running back	Springfield (Mass.)	
14	341	Gary Brackett	Guard	Holy Cross	
15	367	Pat Hauser	Wide receiver	East Tennessee State	
16	393	Charles Williams	Guard	Tennessee State	
17	419	George Myles	Defensive tackle	Morris Brown	
Made roster * Made at least one Pro Bowl during career

=== Undrafted free agents ===
1970 undrafted free agents of note
Player	Position	College
Bob Hamilton	Wide receiver	Prairie View A&M
Jesse Kaye	Quarterback	Tampa
Jim Langer	Center	South Dakota State
Doug Swift	Linebacker	Amherst
Doug Woolsey	Linebacker	Boise State
Bill Young	Safety	Tennessee
Alan Zerfoss	Tackle	Wyoming

== Personnel ==
=== Staff / Coaches ===
1970 Miami Dolphins staff
Front office: President – Joe Robbie; Vice president – Don Shula; Director of player personnel – Joe Thomas; Head coaches: Head coach – Don Shula; Offensive coaches: Offense/receivers – Howard Schnellenberger; Offensive backs – Carl Taseff; Offensive line – Monte Clark	Defensive coaches: Defense/linebackers – Bill Arnsparger; Defensive line – Mike Scarry; Defensive backs – Tom Keane

=== Roster ===
1970 Miami Dolphins roster
Quarterbacks (QB): 12 Bob Griese; 5 John Stofa; Running backs (RB): 39 Larry Csonka; 32 Hubert Ginn; 21 Jim Kiick; 35 Stan Mitchell; 22 Mercury Morris; Wide receivers (WR): 89 Karl Noonan; 87 Willie Richardson; 81 Howard Twilley; 42 Paul Warfield; Tight ends (TE): 80 Marv Fleming; 88 Jim Mandich	Offensive linemen (OL): 77 Doug Crusan T; 73 Norm Evans T; 67 Bob Kuechenberg G; 62 Jim Langer G; 66 Larry Little G; 60 Carl Mauck C; 79 Wayne Moore T; 78 Maxie Williams G; Defensive linemen (DL): 71 Frank Cornish DT; 72 Bob Heinz DT; 70 Jim Riley DE; 74 John Richardson DT; 84 Bill Stanfill DE	Linebackers (LB): 85 Nick Buoniconti MLB; 54 Ted Davis OLB; 57 Mike Kolen OLB; 56 Jesse Powell MLB; 59 Doug Swift OLB; Defensive backs (DB): 40 Dick Anderson SS; 44 Dean Brown CB/S; 25 Tim Foley CB; 45 Curtis Johnson CB; 26 Lloyd Mumphord CB; 48 Bob Petrella SS; 13 Jake Scott FS; Special teams (ST): 20 Larry Seiple P; 1 Garo Yepremian K	Practice squad: 55 Randy Edmunds LB; 75 Manny Fernandez DT; 11 Jesse Kaye QB; 53 Norm McBride DE; 50 Dick Palmer LB; 31 Barry Pryor RB; Reserve: 83 Jim Cox TE (IR); 42 Bill Darnall WR (IR); 61 Bob DeMarco C (IR); 15 Karl Kremser K (IR); 76 George Myles DT (Military); 51 Ed Weisacosky LB (IR); Rookies in italics

== Regular season ==
=== Schedule ===
Week	Date	Opponent	Result	Record	Attendance
1	September 20	at **Boston Patriots**	**L** 14–27	0–1	32,607
2	September 27	at Houston Oilers	**W** 20–10	1–1	39,840
3	October 3	Oakland Raiders	**W** 20–13	2–1	57,140
4	October 10	at **New York Jets**	**W** 20–6	3–1	62,712
5	October 18	at **Buffalo Bills**	**W** 33–14	4–1	41,312
6	October 25	Cleveland Browns	**L** 0–28	4–2	75,313
7	November 1	at **Baltimore Colts**	**L** 0–35	4–3	60,240
8	November 8	at Philadelphia Eagles	**L** 17–24	4–4	58,171
9	November 15	New Orleans Saints	**W** 21–10	5–4	52,866
10	November 22	**Baltimore Colts**	**W** 34–17	6–4	67,699
11	November 30	at Atlanta Falcons	**W** 20–7	7–4	54,036
12	December 6	**Boston Patriots**	**W** 37–20	8–4	51,032
13	December 13	**New York Jets**	**W** 16–10	9–4	75,099
14	December 20	**Buffalo Bills**	**W** 45–7	10–4	70,990

Saturday (October 3, 10), Monday (November 30)

Note: Intra-division opponents are in bold text.

=== Standings ===
AFC East
	W	L	T	PCT	DIV	CONF	PF	PA	STK
Baltimore Colts	11	2	1	.846	6–1–1	8–2–1	321	234	W4
Miami Dolphins	10	4	0	.714	6–2	8–3	297	228	W6
New York Jets	4	10	0	.286	2–6	2–9	255	286	L3
Buffalo Bills	3	10	1	.231	3–4–1	3–7–1	204	337	L5
Boston Patriots	2	12	0	.143	2–6	2–9	149	361	L3

Note: Tie games were not officially counted in the standings until 1972.

== Postseason ==
Round	Date	Opponent	Result	Record	Venue	Attendance
Divisional	December 27	at Oakland Raiders	L 14–21	0–1	Oakland–Alameda County Coliseum	54,401
