= Howard Twilley =

American football player (1943–2025)

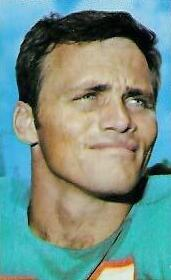
- Twilley in 1969

No. 81
- Position: Wide receiver

Personal information
- Born: December 25, 1943; Houston, Texas, U.S.
- Died: February 5, 2025 (aged 81)
- Listed height: 5 ft 10 in (1.78 m)
- Listed weight: 185 lb (84 kg)

Career information
- High school: Galena Park (Galena Park, Texas)
- College: Tulsa (1963–1965)
- NFL draft: 1966: 14th round, 209th overall pick
- AFL draft: 1966: 12th round, 101st overall pick

Career history
- Miami Dolphins (1966–1976)

Awards and highlights
- 2× Super Bowl champion (VII, VIII); UPI Lineman of the Year (1965); Unanimous All-American (1965); Third-team All-American (1964); Tulsa Golden Hurricane Jersey No. 81 retired

Career NFL/AFL statistics
- Receptions: 212
- Receiving yards: 3,064
- Receiving touchdowns: 23
- Stats at Pro Football Reference
- College Football Hall of Fame

Howard James Twilley Jr. (December 25, 1943 – February 5, 2025) was an American professional football player who was a wide receiver for the Miami Dolphins of the American Football League (AFL) and National Football League (NFL) from 1966 to 1976. He played college football for the Tulsa Golden Hurricane and was the runner up for the Heisman Trophy in 1965. Twilley and tackle Norm Evans were the only two players on the original 1966 Dolphins squad to play on the 1972 Dolphins team that had the NFL's only perfect season and won Super Bowl VII. He was also on the Dolphins team the following year when it again won the championship in Super Bowl VIII.

== College career ==
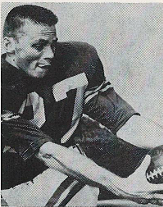
Twilley in the 1964 Tulsa Golden Hurricane media guide

Twilley began his college career as a cornerback before switching to receiver midway through this sophomore year. During his 1965 season at Tulsa, Twilley set NCAA records for the most receiving yards in a season (1,779), a record that stood until broken by Nevada's Alex Van Dyke in 1995, and for the most receptions in a season (134), which stood until broken by Houston's Manny Hazard in 1989. Among his many dazzling games that season was a five-touchdown, 230-yard effort against Louisville. Twilley also had four more games where he amassed over 200 yards. Following the regular season, Twilley was chosen as the captain of the Academic All-American team and was the MVP of the 1966 Senior Bowl.

He finished his three seasons at Tulsa with 261 receptions for 3,334 yards (a Tulsa record that stood until 2022) and 32 touchdowns, and was enshrined in the school's athletic hall of fame in 1984. In 1992 Twilley was inducted into the College Football Hall of Fame.

== Professional career ==
Twilley finished his NFL career with 212 receptions for 3,064 yards and 23 touchdowns. He also caught a 28-yard touchdown pass in the Dolphins' Super Bowl VII win over the Washington Redskins.

== NFL/AFL career statistics ==
Legend
	Won the Super Bowl
**Bold**	Career high

=== Regular season ===
Year	Team	Games		Receiving				
Year	Team	GP	GS	Rec	Yds	Avg	Lng	TD
1966	MIA	6	1	10	128	12.8	20	0
1967	MIA	14	10	24	314	13.1	42	2
1968	MIA	14	14	**39**	**604**	15.5	40	1
1969	MIA	4	1	10	158	15.8	33	1
1970	MIA	14	10	22	281	12.8	23	**5**
1971	MIA	14	12	23	349	15.2	41	4
1972	MIA	13	11	20	364	**18.2**	**44**	3
1973	MIA	6	0	2	30	15.0	19	0
1974	MIA	13	9	24	256	10.7	21	2
1975	MIA	14	8	24	366	15.3	32	4
1976	MIA	8	6	14	214	15.3	39	1
Career		120	82	212	3,064	14.5	44	23

=== Playoffs ===
Year	Team	Games		Receiving				
Year	Team	GP	GS	Rec	Yds	Avg	Lng	TD
1970	MIA	1	1	1	14	14.0	14	0
1971	MIA	3	3	**8**	**111**	13.9	23	0
1972	MIA	3	3	4	61	**15.3**	**28**	**1**
1973	MIA	3	0	0	0	0.0	0	0
1974	MIA	1	0	0	0	0.0	0	0
Career		11	7	13	186	14.3	28	1

== Business career ==
Having earned an MBA from the University of Miami in 1971, after Twilley's football career ended, he pursued a career in business. He owned 28 The Athlete's Foot sporting goods stores before selling them in 1990, and worked in an investment firm. In 1994, he actively considered a run for the United States House of Representatives to succeed Jim Inhofe in Oklahoma's 1st congressional district when Inhofe decided to run for the United States Senate but he ultimately decided to support the candidacy of another conservative Republican former NFL star, Steve Largent. He was inducted into the Oklahoma Sports Hall of Fame in 1995.

== Death ==
Twilley died on February 5, 2025, at the age of 81.

== See also ==
- List of NCAA major college football yearly scoring leaders
