= Ed Jenkins (American football) =

American football player (born 1950)

No. 28, 24, 30, 29
- Position: Wide receiver

Personal information
- Born: August 31, 1950 (age 76); Jacksonville, Florida, U.S.
- Listed height: 6 ft 2 in (1.88 m)
- Listed weight: 210 lb (95 kg)

Career information
- High school: St. Francis Prep (NY)
- College: Holy Cross
- NFL draft: 1972: 11th round, 285th overall pick

Career history
- Miami Dolphins (1972–1973); Buffalo Bills (1974); New England Patriots (1974); New York Giants (1974)

Awards and highlights
- 2× Super Bowl champion (VII, VIII)
- Stats at Pro Football Reference

Edward Jay Jenkins (born August 31, 1950) is an American lawyer and former American football running back in the National Football League (NFL) for the Miami Dolphins, the Buffalo Bills, the New England Patriots, and the New York Giants. He played college football at the College of the Holy Cross as a wide receiver and running back and was drafted by the Dolphins in the eleventh round of the 1972 NFL draft.

== Football career ==
Jenkins was originally drafted as a wide receiver but switched to running back because of his blocking ability and the Dolphins' depth at wide receiver. Although he was on Miami's undefeated 1972 Super Bowl championship team, he did not get a single rushing attempt that season. He spent most of the season on the taxi squad except for the first three games in which he played solely on special teams before injuring his knee. He was on the Dolphins' roster for the 1973 Dolphins Super Bowl championship season but spent the season on injured reserve due to an injured shoulder.

Jenkins was traded to the New York Giants prior to the start of the 1974 season in exchange for a 14th round draft pick, with which the Dolphins selected defensive back James Lewis. He was released by the Giants in October after playing four games for them. He was then signed by the Bills a few days later. Jenkins made his only NFL pass reception with the Bills in a game against the Houston Oilers on November 10, 1974. The Bills released him after 5 games with them to make room on the roster for defensive back Al Randolph. He was then signed by the New England Patriots and played 4 games for them in 1974. In the final game of the season against the Dolphins, on December 15, Jenkins recovered a fumble to set up a Patriots touchdown, but Miami won the game. The Patriots released Jenkins before the 1975 season. In 1975, Jenkins was in Packers training camp. His reps were limited, and he went to coach Bart Starr to discuss his future. “Coach Starr said, ‘Eddie Jenkins, you’re going to make a great lawyer,’ ” Jenkins said.

== Personal life ==
After his football career ended Jenkins obtained his J.D. degree from Suffolk Law School in 1978, the same law school as 1972 Miami teammate Nick Buoniconti graduated from. He subsequently worked as an attorney, and was a candidate for Suffolk County district attorney in 1990.

His son Julian Jenkins played as a defensive end for the Tampa Bay Buccaneers in 2006 after being drafted in the 5th round of the 2006 NFL draft.

Jenkins was married to American lawyer Linda Champion. The couple divorced in 2015.
