= Marv Fleming =

American football player (born 1942)

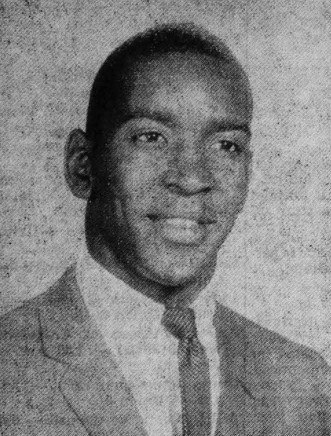
- Fleming, circa 1961

No. 80, 81
- Position: Tight end

Personal information
- Born: January 2, 1942 (age 84); Longview, Texas, U.S.
- Listed height: 6 ft 4 in (1.93 m)
- Listed weight: 232 lb (105 kg)

Career information
- High school: Compton (Compton, California)
- College: Utah
- NFL draft: 1963: 11th round, 154th overall pick
- AFL draft: 1963: 9th round, 69th overall pick

Career history
- Green Bay Packers (1963–1969); Miami Dolphins (1970–1974); Washington Redskins (1975)*
- * Offseason or practice squad member only

Awards and highlights
- 4× Super Bowl champion (I, II, VII, VIII); 3× NFL champion (1965, 1966, 1967); Green Bay Packers Hall of Fame

Career NFL statistics
- Receptions: 157
- Receiving yards: 1,823
- Receiving touchdowns: 16
- Stats at Pro Football Reference

Marvin Lawrence Fleming (born January 2, 1942) is an American former professional football player who was a tight end for 12 seasons in the National Football League (NFL), seven with the Green Bay Packers and five with the Miami Dolphins. He was a member of five NFL championship teams.

Fleming played college football for the Utah Utes. He is the first player in NFL history to play in five Super Bowls—with Green Bay (I, II) and Miami (VI, VII, VIII). He played under hall of fame head coaches Vince Lombardi and Don Shula for five seasons each.

== Early life ==
Born in Longview, Texas, Fleming was raised in southern California in Compton and graduated from Compton High School. He played college football at the University of Utah in Salt Lake City under head coach Ray Nagel.

== Professional career ==
Selected 154th overall in the 11th round of the 1963 NFL draft by the two-time defending NFL champion Packers, Fleming won three consecutive NFL titles and the first two Super Bowls in Green Bay. After seven seasons, the last two under head coach Phil Bengtson, he signed with the Dolphins in May 1970. Fleming was with the Dolphins for five seasons (and three Super Bowls), then was traded to the Washington Redskins for running back Charley Harraway. He was in the Redskins' 1975 training camp under George Allen, but missed the final cut in September and retired.

Fleming was inducted into the Green Bay Packers Hall of Fame in 2010.

== NFL career statistics ==
Legend
	Won the Super Bowl
	Won the NFL championship
	Led the league
**Bold**	Career high

=== Regular season ===
Year	Team	Games		Receiving				
Year	Team	GP	GS	Rec	Yds	Avg	Lng	TD
1963	GNB	14	2	7	132	**18.9**	33	2
1964	GNB	14	0	4	36	9.0	10	0
1965	GNB	13	10	14	141	10.1	31	2
1966	GNB	14	14	**31**	**361**	11.6	**53**	2
1967	GNB	14	14	10	126	12.6	19	1
1968	GNB	14	14	25	278	11.1	32	**3**
1969	GNB	12	12	18	226	12.6	23	2
1970	MIA	14	14	18	205	11.4	36	0
1971	MIA	14	13	13	137	10.5	23	2
1972	MIA	14	14	13	156	12.0	31	1
1973	MIA	11	11	3	22	7.3	15	0
1974	MIA	14	5	1	3	3.0	3	1
		162	123	157	1,823	11.6	53	16

=== Playoffs ===
Year	Team	Games		Receiving				
Year	Team	GP	GS	Rec	Yds	Avg	Lng	TD
1965	GNB	2	0	0	0	0.0	0	0
1966	GNB	2	2	5	**72**	**14.4**	24	0
1967	GNB	3	3	**7**	65	9.3	12	0
1970	MIA	1	1	0	0	0.0	0	0
1971	MIA	3	3	5	64	12.8	**27**	**1**
1972	MIA	3	3	5	50	10.0	15	0
1973	MIA	2	0	0	0	0.0	0	0
1974	MIA	1	1	0	0	0.0	0	0
		17	13	22	251	11.4	27	1

== Personal life ==
Fleming was the victim of an identity theft scam in the late 1970s and early 1980s. Arthur Lee Trotter posed as Fleming and was arrested in Texas in 1980 for selling phony stock in NFL teams. Caught, Trotter conceded to police that he was not Fleming: he said he was actually former Baltimore Colts star John Mackey.

Fleming and receiver Roy Jefferson (b.1943) are cousins less than two years apart and grew up together in Compton. They played football at Compton High School and college football at Utah. Both on offense, the two were on opposing teams in Super Bowl VII, Fleming on the Dolphins and Jefferson on the Redskins.
