= Mack Lamb =

American football player (1944–2010)

- Lamb, circa 1967

No. 45, 28, 32, 22
- Position: Defensive back

Personal information
- Born: May 9, 1944; Miami, Florida, U.S.
- Died: October 28, 2010 (aged 66); Miami, Florida, U.S.
- Listed height: 6 ft 1 in (1.85 m)
- Listed weight: 188 lb (85 kg)

Career information
- High school: Booker T. Washington (Miami)
- College: Tennessee A&I
- AFL draft: 1967: undrafted

Career history
- Miami Dolphins (1967–1968); San Diego Chargers (1969)*; Orlando Panthers (1969); BC Lions (1970); Hamilton Tiger-Cats (1970)
- * Offseason or practice squad member only
- Stats at Pro Football Reference

Mack Edward Lamb (May 9, 1944 – October 28, 2010) was an American professional football defensive back who played for the Miami Dolphins of the American Football League (AFL). He played college football for the Tennessee A&I Tigers. He was the first native Miamian to play for the Dolphins.

== Early life ==
Mack Edward Lamb was born on May 9, 1944, in Miami, Florida. He attended Booker T. Washington Senior High School in Miami.

== College career ==
Lamb enrolled at Tennessee Agricultural & Industrial State College to play college football for the Tigers. As a freshman, he earned a varsity letter as a defensive end. He lettered again in 1966 at defensive back. In 1966, he made 15 tackles and five interceptions during a practice session, earning the nickname "Contact" from his teammates.

== Professional career ==
After going undrafted in the 1967 NFL and AFL drafts, Lamb signed with the AFL's Miami Dolphins on March 31, 1967. He made the regular season roster after impressing the Dolphins during the preseason. He played in 15 games, starting six, for the Dolphins from 1967 to 1968, recording one interception, one fumble recovery, and one kick return for 24 yards. Lamb was the first native Miamian to play for the Dolphins.

On July 3, 1969, Lamb was traded to the San Diego Chargers for Larry Little, his former high school teammate. Lamb was waived on September 9 before the start of the 1969 season.

After declining a taxi squad offer from the Chargers, Lamb signed with the Orlando Panthers of the Continental Football League on September 18, 1969. He scored one safety for the Panthers during the 1969 season.

In May 1970, it was reported that Lamb had signed with the BC Lions of the Canadian Football League (CFL). He played in four games for the Lions during the 1970 season, posting eight kickoff returns for 202 yards, one punt return for ten yards, and one fumble recovery.

On August 21, 1970, Lamb was traded to the Hamilton Tiger-Cats for a 1971 CFL draft pick. He played in ten games for Hamilton in 1970, totaling one interception for 19 yards, three kickoff returns for 78 yards, and two fumble recoveries. He was waived on June 17, 1971.

== Personal life ==
Lamb died on October 28, 2010, in Miami.
