= Jim Del Gaizo =

American football player (born 1947)

No. 11, 12
- Position: Quarterback

Personal information
- Born: May 31, 1947 (age 79); Everett, Massachusetts, U.S.
- Listed height: 6 ft 1 in (1.85 m)
- Listed weight: 198 lb (90 kg)

Career information
- High school: Revere (MA)
- College: Syracuse Tampa
- NFL draft: 1970: undrafted

Career history
- Cincinnati Bengals (1970)*; Miami Dolphins (1971–1972); Green Bay Packers (1973); New York Giants (1974-1975); Miami Dolphins (1975); Miami Dolphins (1976)*
- * Offseason or practice squad member only

Career NFL statistics
- Passing attempts: 103
- Passing completions: 44
- Completion percentage: 42.7%
- TD–INT: 4–10
- Passing yards: 648
- Passer rating: 37.3
- Stats at Pro Football Reference

Jim Del Gaizo (born May 31, 1947) is an American former professional football player who was a quarterback for five seasons (1971–1975) in the National Football League (NFL) for the Miami Dolphins, Green Bay Packers, and New York Giants. He played college football for the Tampa Spartans.

== Early life ==
Born in Everett, Massachusetts, and raised in Revere, Del Gaizo was the star quarterback for Revere High School, and still holds the Patriots' most notable passing records.

== Career ==
After playing college football at both Syracuse and Tampa, Del Gaizo went unselected in the 1971 NFL draft, which had only three quarterbacks taken in the first six rounds and only seventeen selected over the entire seventeen rounds. He is one of only two quarterbacks ever to play at Tampa who appeared in the NFL. Del Gaizo made the Dolphins' roster as an undrafted free agent in 1971 and spent the season as the third-string quarterback and was not activated the entire season.

In Del Gaizo's rookie season (his second season although his first one on an active roster), he was the backup quarterback in four appearances during the Dolphins' undefeated 17–0 season in 1972 that culminated in a victory in Super Bowl VII. Del Gaizo completed 5 of 9 passes for two touchdowns and one interception; he also lost one fumble.

The Dolphins did not retain Del Gaizo's services for the 1973 season; however, his stock had risen after two good preseasons coupled with his game performances in the 1972 season, and he was traded to the Packers for two second round picks (one in 1974 and one in 1975). Green Bay is where he saw his most extensive game action, appearing in eight games while starting three. He suffered a separated shoulder early, and his final statistics were: 27 completions in 69 passing attempts with two touchdowns, six interceptions, and one fumble. In the strike season of 1974, he was traded to the Giants for a third round draft pick.

Del Gaizo's final season in 1975 was spent with the Giants, where he appeared in four games (one start), completing 12 of 32 passes with no touchdowns and three interceptions. The Giants released him and Del Gaizo never appeared in another NFL regular season game. However, he was re-signed by the Dolphins for the second half of the 1975 season after injuries had sidelined both Bob Griese and Earl Morrall, and was on the roster for the final three games of the season, but did not play.

He was invited to camp the following season, and played in the 1976 pre-season for the Dolphins, where he completed 25 passes out of 40 attempts, for 372 yards, three touchdowns, and no interceptions; however, he was cut by the Dolphins. Del Gaizo entertained starting job offers from the Atlanta Falcons and Buffalo Bills, as well as a back-up offer from the Pittsburgh Steelers (which he was quoted as saying later he should have probably accepted); however, disillusioned with both pro football and the Miami Dolphins (where he felt he had earned his spot), he decided to retire at the age of 29.

After the NFL career, Del Gaizo worked as a mortgage broker.
