= Al Young (wide receiver) =

American football player (born 1949)

Profile
- Position: Wide receiver

Personal information
- Born: August 24, 1949 (age 77); Norway, South Carolina, U.S.
- Listed height: 6 ft 1 in (1.85 m)
- Listed weight: 195 lb (88 kg)

Career information
- High school: Booker T. Washington (Columbia, South Carolina)
- College: South Carolina State
- NFL draft: 1971: 13th round, 320th overall pick

Career history
- Pittsburgh Steelers (1971–1972); NY Stars/Charlotte Hornets (1974–1975)

Career NFL statistics
- Receptions: 6
- Receiving yards: 86
- Stats at Pro Football Reference

Al Young (born August 24, 1949) is an American former professional football player who was a wide receiver in the National Football League (NFL) and World Football League (WFL). He played college football for the South Carolina State Bulldogs.

== College career ==
Young was a member of the South Carolina State Bulldogs for four seasons. As a senior he had 19 catches for 273 yards and seven touchdowns. Young was inducted into South Carolina State's Athletic Hall of Fame in 2012.

== Professional career ==
Young was selected in the 13th round of the 1971 NFL draft by the Pittsburgh Steelers. He was inactive for most of his rookie year and only played in the final game of the season. In 1972, Young caught six passes for 86 yards and played in all 14 regular season games. Young was Pittsburgh's leading receiver with four catches for 54 yards and one touchdown in the 1972 AFC Championship Game.

Young was signed by the New York Stars of the newly-formed World Football League (WFL) in 1974. In his first season with the team, which relocated midway through the season and was renamed the Charlotte Hornets, he caught 33 passes for 399 yards and one touchdown. Young missed part of the 1975 season due to injury and had 13 receptions for 198 yards before the WFL folded.

== Post-football ==
After his football career, Young taught physical education at North Augusta High School and coached the men's basketball and track and field teams for 37 years until retiring in 2014. He returned to coach the North Augusta Girls' Basketball Team, which he has built a dynasty, winning the State Championship 5 times in the past 7 years. His team has competed in the State Championship Game 6 of the past 7 years.
