= Tom Reynolds (American football) =

American football player (born 1949)

No. 21, 87
- Position: Wide receiver

Personal information
- Born: April 11, 1949 (age 77); Pasadena, California, U.S.
- Listed height: 6 ft 3 in (1.91 m)
- Listed weight: 200 lb (91 kg)

Career information
- High school: John Muir (CA); Morningside (CA)
- College: San Diego State
- NFL draft: 1972: 2nd round, 49th overall pick

Career history
- New England Patriots (1972); Chicago Bears (1973)

Awards and highlights
- Second-team All-Pac-8 (1969)

Career NFL statistics
- Receptions: 15
- Receiving yards: 279
- Receiving touchdowns: 2
- Stats at Pro Football Reference

Raoul Thomas Reynolds Jr. (born April 11, 1949) is an American former professional football player who was a wide receiver in the National Football League (NFL). He played for the New England Patriots and Chicago Bears. He played college football for the San Diego State Aztecs.

== College career ==
Tom Reynolds played his college career for San Diego State under Head Coach Don Coryell, At the time, San Diego State was a part of the Pacific Coast Athletic Association. Reynolds was the number one receiver in the Aztecs offense, serving as a primary target for quarterbacks Dennis Shaw and Brian Sipe in 1969. Reynolds had 50 receptions for over 800 yards receiving and led the team with 18 touchdowns.

After sitting out the 1970 season, Reynolds returned in 1971. That season, Reynolds again found himself the primary target of Sipe. This led Reynolds leading San Diego State in receptions and receiving yards.

== Pro career ==
The New England Patriots selected Reynolds with their second pick in the 1972 NFL draft. Reynolds caught 8 passes for 152 yards his rookie season. The following preseason, Reynolds was acquired along with linebacker Ken Lee by the Chicago Bears in exchange for draft picks. Later during the regular season, Reynolds was injured on a play in which he was blocked by an opposing player during an interception return. The injury effectively ended his career as Reynolds would spend the 1974 and 1975 season on Injured Reserve, and never again appeared in an NFL game.
