= Tom Wickert =

American football player (born 1952)

No. 60, 66
- Positions: Tackle, guard

Personal information
- Born: April 5, 1952 (age 74); Astoria, Oregon, U.S.
- Listed height: 6 ft 4 in (1.93 m)
- Listed weight: 246 lb (112 kg)

Career information
- High school: Larkspur (CA) Redwood
- College: Washington State
- NFL draft: 1974: 9th round, 212th overall pick

Career history
- Miami Dolphins (1974); New Orleans Saints (1975–1976); Detroit Lions (1977); Kansas City Chiefs (1977)
- Stats at Pro Football Reference

Tom Wickert (born April 5, 1952) is an American former professional football player who was a tackle and guard in the National Football League (NFL). He played college football for the Washington State Cougars. Wickert played in the NFL for the Miami Dolphins in 1974, the New Orleans Saints from 1975 to 1976 and for the Detroit Lions and Kansas City Chiefs in 1977.
