= Mercury Morris =

American football player (1947–2024)

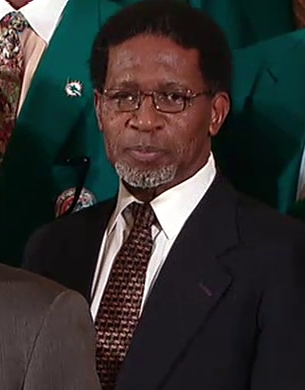
- Morris at The White House, August 2013

No. 22, 23
- Position: Running back

Personal information
- Born: January 5, 1947; Pittsburgh, Pennsylvania, U.S.
- Died: September 21, 2024 (aged 77); Palm Beach, Florida, U.S.
- Listed height: 5 ft 10 in (1.78 m)
- Listed weight: 190 lb (86 kg)

Career information
- High school: Avonworth (Pittsburgh)
- College: West Texas State
- NFL draft: 1969: 3rd round, 63rd overall pick

Career history
- Miami Dolphins (1969–1975); San Diego Chargers (1976)

Awards and highlights
- 2× Super Bowl champion (VII, VIII); 3× Pro Bowl (1971–1973); NFL rushing touchdowns leader (1972); NFL rushing yards per attempt leader (1973); AFL kickoff return yards leader (1969); Dolphins Walk of Fame (2013); First-team All-American (1968)

Career NFL/AFL statistics
- Rushing yards: 4,133
- Rushing average: 5.1
- Receptions: 54
- Receiving yards: 543
- Return yards: 3,118
- Total touchdowns: 35
- Stats at Pro Football Reference

Eugene Edward "Mercury" Morris (January 5, 1947 – September 21, 2024) was an American professional football player who was a running back and kick returner. He played for eight years, primarily for the Miami Dolphins in the American Football League (AFL) first as a rookie in 1969. Then he played in the American Football Conference (AFC) after the 1970 merger with the National Football League (NFL).

Morris played in three Super Bowls, winning twice and was selected to three Pro Bowls. In 1982, Morris was convicted of felony drug trafficking charges. After three and a half years in prison, he was released following a plea agreement in which he pled no contest to cocaine conspiracy charges.

== Amateur career ==
Born in Pittsburgh on January 5, 1947, Morris attended Avonworth High School in the northwestern suburbs of the city. He attended West Texas State University (now West Texas A&M University) in Canyon from 1965 to 1969, where he was an All-American for the Buffaloes at tailback in 1967 and 1968. In 1967, he finished second in the nation to O. J. Simpson of USC in rushing yards with 1,274.

In his record setting year of 1968, Morris set collegiate records for rushing yards in a single game, with 340, rushing yards for a single season with 1,571, and rushing yards over a three-year college career (freshmen being ineligible), with 3,388. Simpson broke the single-season rushing record just one week after Morris set it. Morris's three-season career rushing record was broken two years later by Don McCauley.

After college, Morris was picked 63rd overall in the third round of the 1969 AFL-NFL Common Draft by the AFL's Miami Dolphins.

== Professional football career ==
=== Early career ===
Morris excelled as both a running back and kick returner. The majority of his playing days were spent with the Miami Dolphins. From 1969 to 1971, he backed up Jim Kiick at halfback and served as the Dolphins' primary kickoff return man. In his rookie year of 1969, Morris averaged 26.4 yards per kickoff return, leading the AFL in kickoff returns with 43 and in kickoff return yardage with 1136. Both totals would have also led the NFL. His 105-yard return was the longest in the AFL that season, and he was also one of the AFL's leading punt returners that year. In 1970, he missed some time on the field due to a leg injury, but his 6.8 yard per carry average on 60 runs was the highest in the league among players with at least 50 runs.

=== Super Bowl years ===
In 1971, despite being unhappy with his minimal playing time as backup halfback, he helped the Dolphins to their first Super Bowl, Super Bowl VI, by leading the American Football Conference (AFC) with a 28.2 yard kickoff return average. During the regular season, Morris also made the most of his opportunities at running back, gaining 315 rushing yards on 57 carries for a 5.5 yard average, an average that would have led the NFL if he had enough carries to qualify. That season, Morris was selected for the Pro Bowl for the first time as a kick returner, although he also was used as a running back in the game.

In the 1972 and 1973 seasons, Morris earned Super Bowl rings in Super Bowl VII and Super Bowl VIII and was selected for the Pro Bowl in both years. In 1972, he shared the halfback position with Kiick, participating in fewer plays than Kiick but having more carries as a running back. That year, he ran for exactly 1,000 yds on 190 carries, becoming, with teammate Larry Csonka, the first 1,000-yard tandem in NFL history. Morris was first thought to have finished with 991 yards but the Dolphins' management asked the league to examine a play in which Morris fumbled a lateral so he was awarded the nine yards previously recorded as lost on the play, giving him 1,000 yards for the season. That year, Morris also led the NFL with 12 rushing touchdowns and his 5.3 yard per carry average was third in the NFL.

By 1973, Morris had taken over the starting halfback spot and rushed for 954 yards on 149 carries, despite playing with a neck injury late in the season. His 6.4 yard per carry average led the NFL for the season, and he finished third in the NFL in rushing touchdowns.

Morris excelled in several playoff games leading up to Miami's two Super Bowl victories. In 1972, he led the Dolphins in rushing in both the divisional playoff game against Cleveland and the AFC Championship Game against Pittsburgh with 72 yards and 76 yards respectively. In 1973, he led the Dolphins in rushing for the divisional playoff game against Cincinnati with 106 yards and added 86 more rushing yards in the AFC Championship Game against Oakland.

=== Late career ===
Morris continued playing for the Dolphins in 1974 and 1975, before spending the last season of his shortened career playing for the San Diego Chargers in 1976. In 1974 a knee injury Morris suffered in the preseason limited him to five regular season games that year. Morris missed the season opener and returned for the second game of the season, but then reinjured the knee in game 3. After playing three more games in November and December he suffered a neck injury and reinjured the knee, effectively ending his season. In 1975, Morris led the Dolphins in rushing yards, with 875, despite sharing the halfback position with Benny Malone. After being traded to San Diego before the 1976 season, he ran for 256 yards on 50 carries that year and decided to retire after the season, in part due to lingering difficulties from the neck injury suffered in a 1973 game against the Pittsburgh Steelers and reinjured in a car accident.

Morris finished in the top five of the NFL in rushing touchdowns twice and total touchdowns once during his eight-year career. His career 5.1 yard per carry average was third all time among NFL players (1st among halfbacks), only behind fullbacks Jim Brown and Marion Motley. As of 2017, he ranked sixth all time behind Brown, Motley, running back Jamaal Charles, and quarterbacks Michael Vick and Randall Cunningham. Morris's career kickoff return average of 26.5 is among the all-time top 20 for players with at least 100 returns, and was in the top 10 at the time of his retirement. As of 2017 he was ranked 18th.

== Post-football career ==
In 1974, Morris co-starred as Bookie Garrett in the blaxploitation film The Black Six alongside other football stars of the day. In 1982, Morris was convicted of cocaine trafficking. He was sentenced to 20 years imprisonment, with a mandatory 15-year term. On March 6, 1986, his conviction was overturned by the Florida Supreme Court because evidence he had offered to prove his entrapment defense had been excluded under a mistaken characterization as hearsay. Morris was granted a new trial. He was able to reach a plea bargain with the prosecutor, resulting in his release from prison on May 23, 1986, after having served three years. He later appeared in an anti-cocaine public service announcement where he talked about his time in prison.

After being released from prison, Morris later began a career as a motivational speaker.

Morris died on September 21, 2024, at the age of 77. He is survived by five children and three sisters.

== NFL career statistics ==
Legend
	Led the league
	Won the Super Bowl
**Bold**	Career high

Year	Team	Games		Rushing						Receiving					Fumbles	
Year	Team	GP	GS	Att	Yds	Avg	Y/G	Lng	TD	Rec	Yds	Avg	Lng	TD	Fum	FR
1969	MIA	**14**	0	23	110	4.8	7.9	37	1	6	65	10.8	29	0	4	0
1970	MIA	12	1	60	409	**6.8**	34.1	40	0	12	149	12.4	**50**	0	6	**1**
1971	MIA	**14**	3	57	315	5.5	22.5	51	1	5	16	3.2	11	0	1	0
1972	MIA	**14**	11	190	**1,000**	5.3	71.4	33	**12**	**15**	**168**	11.2	34	0	**8**	**1**
1973	MIA	13	10	149	954	6.4	**73.4**	**70**	10	4	51	12.8	36	0	3	0
1974	MIA	5	3	56	214	3.8	42.8	17	1	2	27	**13.5**	23	**1**	4	**1**
1975	MIA	**14**	**14**	**219**	875	4.0	62.5	49	4	2	15	7.5	10	0	5	**1**
1976	SD	13	0	50	256	5.1	19.7	30	2	8	52	6.5	20	0	1	0
Career		99	42	804	4,133	5.1	41.7	70	31	54	543	10.1	50	1	32	4
