= Andre Tillman =

American football player (born 1952)

No. 87
- Position: Tight end

Personal information
- Born: November 1, 1952 (age 74); Dallas, Texas, U.S.
- Listed height: 6 ft 4 in (1.93 m)
- Listed weight: 230 lb (104 kg)

Career information
- High school: Lake Highlands (Dallas, Texas)
- College: Texas Tech
- NFL draft: 1974: 2nd round, 38th overall pick

Career history
- Miami Dolphins (1974–1978)

Awards and highlights
- First-team All-American (1973); First-team All-SWC (1973)

Career NFL statistics
- Receptions: 66
- Receiving yards: 757
- Touchdowns: 6
- Stats at Pro Football Reference

Andre Tillman (born November 1, 1952) is an American former professional football player who was a tight end in the National Football League (NFL). Growing up, he attended Lake Highlands High School. He played college football for the Texas Tech Red Raiders. He was selected by the Miami Dolphins in the second round of the 1974 NFL draft. As of 2017, he was one of five tight ends to ever be selected in the second round by the Dolphins.

Tillman played in a total of 58 games for the Dolphins from 1975 to 1978.
