= Larry Little =

American football player and coach (born 1945)

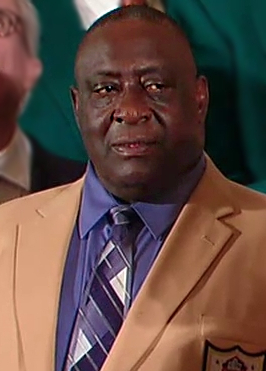
- Little in 2013

No. 73, 66
- Position: Guard

Personal information
- Born: November 2, 1945 (age 81); Groveland, Georgia, U.S.
- Listed height: 6 ft 1 in (1.85 m)
- Listed weight: 265 lb (120 kg)

Career information
- High school: Booker T. Washington (Miami, Florida)
- College: Bethune–Cookman
- NFL draft: 1967: undrafted

Career history

Playing
- San Diego Chargers (1967–1968); Miami Dolphins (1969–1980)

Coaching
- Bethune–Cookman (1983–1991) Head coach; Ohio Glory (1992) Head coach; North Carolina Central (1993–1998) Head coach

Awards and highlights
- As a player: 2× Super Bowl champion (VII, VIII); 5× First-team All-Pro (1971–1975); 2× Second-team All-Pro (1977, 1978); 5× Pro Bowl (1969, 1971–1974); NFL 1970s All-Decade Team; Miami Dolphins Honor Roll; 50 Greatest Dolphins; Miami Dolphins Walk of Fame; As a coach: MEAC Coach of the Year (1984)

Career NFL statistics
- Games played: 183
- Games started: 155
- Fumble recoveries: 6
- Stats at Pro Football Reference

Head coaching record
- Career: College: 78–80–1 (.494); WLAF: 1–9 (.100); Total: 79–89–1 (.470)
- Pro Football Hall of Fame

Larry Chatmon Little (born November 2, 1945) is a former American professional football player who was a guard in the American Football League (AFL) and the National Football League (NFL). He played college football for the Bethune–Cookman Wildcats. He signed with the San Diego Chargers as an undrafted free agent in 1967. After two years in San Diego, he was then traded to the Miami Dolphins where he played for the rest of his career, establishing himself as one of the best guards in the NFL.

Little was a five-time Pro Bowl selection, and a seven-time All-Pro selection. He was the starting right guard of a dominant Dolphins offensive line which included Hall of Fame center Jim Langer and left guard Bob Kuechenberg, that was instrumental in the Dolphins winning Super Bowl VII during their perfect season in 1972, and Super Bowl VIII the following year. He was elected to the NFL 1970s All-Decade Team, a member of the Miami Dolphins Honor Roll, and was elected to the Pro Football Hall of Fame in 1993.

== Early life ==
Little was born in Groveland, Georgia, on November 2, 1945, the second of six children. The family moved to Florida and he grew up in the Overtown neighborhood in Miami. His mother was his greatest influence. As a child, his favorite team was the Baltimore Colts. He attended Booker T. Washington Senior High School in Miami, where he played football as a two-way lineman, starting in his junior and senior years.

He has been inducted into the Booker T. Washington High School Hall of Fame. In 2007, Little was named by the Florida High School Athletic Association to its Team of the Century, to celebrate 100 years of high school football in Florida. In 2016, as part of its Hometown Hall of Fame program, the Pro Football Hall of Fame honored Little with a plaque presented to Booker T. Washington. In 2023, he was inducted into the Florida High School Athletic Association Hall of Fame.

== College career ==
Through the efforts of his high school coach Alkin Hepburn, Little was offered a football scholarship to Bethune-Cookman University (then Bethune-Cookman College) where he played on the Bethune–Cookman Wildcats team from 1964 to 1967. He played on both the offensive and defensive lines at the respective tackle positions. He was a team captain, and a three-time All-Southern Intercollegiate Athletic Conference (SIAC) selection.

His 1966 teammates named him their most valuable player and outstanding defensive player. Little was also named a Little All-American by the Ebony College Scoreboard in 1966. He was inducted into the Bethune-Cookman Hall of Fame in 2012.

Little's defensive line coach, and fellow Bethune-Cookman Hall of famer, Cyril Lloyd "Tank" Johnson was Little's favorite coach at any level. Johnson had played at Bethune-Cookman (class of 1958), served as its football team's assistant coach/defensive coordinator (1961-78), and became the school's athletic director (1972-91).

== Professional career ==
Little went undrafted in 1967. After the draft, he received free agent offers from Miami, San Diego, and Baltimore. He signed as a free agent with the American Football League's San Diego Chargers because they offered him the largest signing bonus ($750). After playing for San Diego in 1967 and 1968, coach Sid Gillman grew frustrated with Little's not controlling his weight. He was traded to the AFL's Miami Dolphins for cornerback Mack Lamb before the 1969 season, when he was named an AFL All-Star. "I didn't particularly like the trade," Little said in the January 1974 issue of SPORT. "The Dolphins weren't much then." In his first year with Miami, although an All-Star, the Dolphins' record was a poor 3-10-1.

Future Pro Football Hall of Fame coach Don Shula became the Dolphins' head coach in 1970. Among other things, he helped Little control his weight. Of the 11 years he played for the Dolphins (1969-1980), Little played ten of them under Shula (1970-1980), missing only four games in 11 seasons, despite numerous injuries. He was considered an intimidating force run blocking and a superb pass blocker.

Little was a key contributor to the success of the Dolphins' punishing running attack of the early and mid-1970s, which featured Larry Csonka, Mercury Morris, and Jim Kiick. Shula, a coach on the NFL 100th Anniversary All Time Team, said Little played a major role in the Dolphins success as both a pass blocker and run blocker. Little was a member of the 1972 Dolphins championship team that went 17-0, which established a record for team rushing yards at the time (2,960 yards in a 14 game season). The Dolphins' rushing average per year in the 1970s (2,372 yards rushing per year) led the NFL in that decade. Little played under offensive line coach Monte Clark, whom Little acknowledged at his Hall of Fame induction.

In 1973, he became to first guard to be paid a $100,000 annual salary.

From 1971 through 1975, Little was named first-team All-Pro five times, and again in 1977; and was second-team All-Pro in 1978 (and named second-team in 1977 by the Associated Press and United Press International). He was All-AFC five times. He appeared in five straight NFL Pro Bowls from 1971 to 1975, and appeared in the 1969 AFL All-Star Game. He was named the National Football League Players Association's AFC Offensive Lineman of the Year three times (1970-1972). He was named to the NFL 1970s All-Decade Team at guard, along with Joe DeLamielleure.

== Coaching ==
He also served as head football coach of his alma mater, from 1983 to 1991, winning Mid-Eastern Athletic Conference championships in 1984 and 1988. He was head coach at North Carolina Central University (NCCU) from 1993 to 1998. At least four of his NCCU players, Shawn Gibbs, Adrian Jones, Trei Oliver, and Dawson Odums went on to become college football coaches. In addition, Little served as head coach of the Ohio Glory of the World League of American Football (which eventually became the now-defunct NFL Europe), for one year. His last head coaching job was with the Miami Morays of the National Indoor Football League in 2005.

== Legacy and honors ==
In 1993, Little was inducted into the Pro Football Hall of Fame, with the NFL's all-time winning coach Don Shula as his presenter. In 2013, he was inducted into Black College Football Hall of Fame. He has also been inducted into the Florida Black Colleges Football Hall of Fame, and the Bob Hayes Hall of Fame (2019). In 1978, he was inducted into the Florida Sports Hall of Fame.

On December 16, 1993, Little was added to the Miami Dolphins Honor Roll. In 2011, Little was among the inaugural class entering the Miami Dolphins Walk of Fame.

In 1999, he was ranked number 79 on The Sporting News' list of the 100 Greatest Football Players.

Miami's City Commission honored Little by naming a street after him.

== Personal life ==
During his playing career and after, he had a boys camp for underprivileged children, the Gold Coast Summer Camp, eventually backed by the United Way. He was also listed in Who's Who in Black America.

Little's younger brother, David Little, was a linebacker for the Pittsburgh Steelers.

== Head coaching record ==
=== College ===
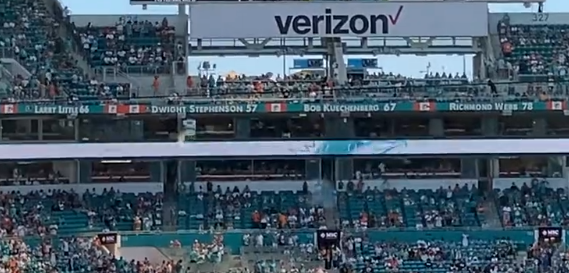
Hall of Famers Little and Dwight Stephenson, up on the Honor Roll, along with Bob Kuechenberg and Richmond Webb.

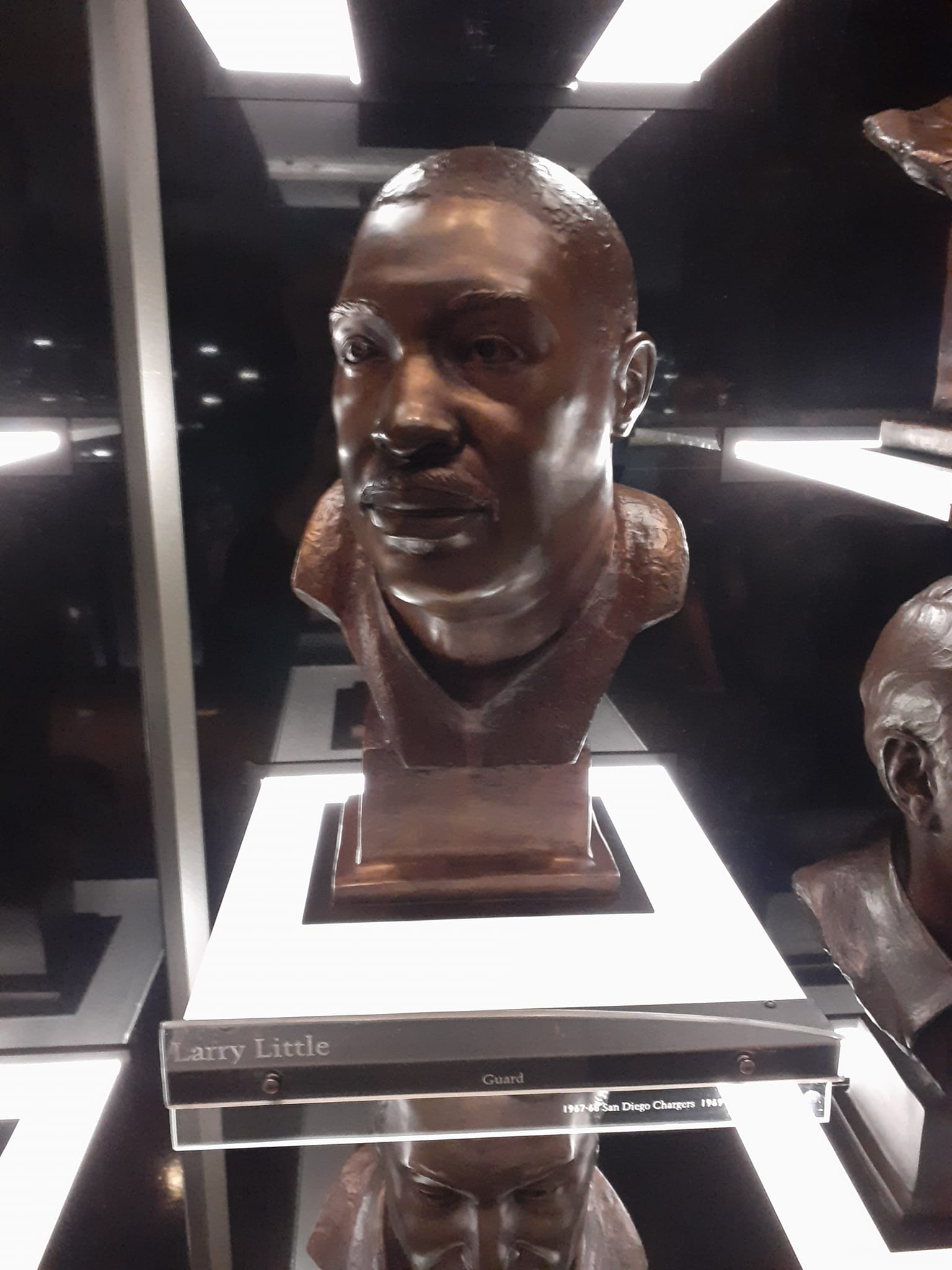
Little's bronze bust at the Pro Football Hall of Fame

| Year | Team | Overall | Conference | Standing | Bowl/playoffs |
|---|---|---|---|---|---|
Bethune–Cookman Wildcats (Mid-Eastern Athletic Conference) (1983–1991)
| 1983 | Bethune–Cookman | 4–4–1 | 1–3 | T–3rd | |
| 1984 | Bethune–Cookman | 7–3 | 4–0 | 1st | |
| 1985 | Bethune–Cookman | 6–4 | 3–1 | 2nd | |
| 1986 | Bethune–Cookman | 3–8 | 2–3 | 5th | |
| 1987 | Bethune–Cookman | 4–7 | 2–3 | 4th | |
| 1988 | Bethune–Cookman | 5–6 | 4–2 | T–1st | |
| 1989 | Bethune–Cookman | 5–5 | 3–3 | T–3rd | |
| 1990 | Bethune–Cookman | 4–7 | 1–5 | 6th | |
| 1991 | Bethune–Cookman | 4–6 | 3–3 | T–3rd | |
| Bethune–Cookman: | | 45–48–1 | 23–23 | | |
North Carolina Central Eagles (Central Intercollegiate Athletic Association) (1993–1998)
| 1993 | North Carolina Central | 6–5 | 5–3 | 4th | |
| 1994 | North Carolina Central | 6–5 | 5–3 | T–3rd | |
| 1995 | North Carolina Central | 5–6 | 4–4 | 5th | |
| 1996 | North Carolina Central | 8–3 | 5–3 | T–4th | |
| 1997 | North Carolina Central | 4–7 | 4–3 | T–4th | |
| 1998 | North Carolina Central | 4–6 | 3–4 | 7th | |
| North Carolina Central: | | 33–32 | 26–20 | | |
| Total: | | 78–80–1 | | | |
National championship Conference title Conference division title or championship game berth

== See also ==
- List of American Football League players
