= Hubert Ginn =

American football player (1947–2023)

No. 32, 27, 33, 28, 29
- Position: Running back

Personal information
- Born: January 4, 1947; Savannah, Georgia, U.S.
- Died: September 21, 2023 (aged 76)
- Listed height: 5 ft 10 in (1.78 m)
- Listed weight: 185 lb (84 kg)

Career information
- High school: Tompkins (Savannah)
- College: Florida A&M
- NFL draft: 1970: 9th round, 211th overall pick

Career history
- Miami Dolphins (1970–1973); Baltimore Colts (1973); Miami Dolphins (1974–1975); Oakland Raiders (1976–1978)

Awards and highlights
- 2× Super Bowl champion (VII, XI)

Career NFL statistics
- Rushing attempts: 132
- Rushing yards: 521
- Rushing TDs: 3
- Stats at Pro Football Reference

Hubert Ginn (January 4, 1947 – September 21, 2023) was an American professional football player who was a running back for nine seasons in the National Football League (NFL). He played for the Miami Dolphins, Baltimore Colts, and Oakland Raiders. He was a member of two Super Bowl championship teams, the 1972 undefeated Dolphins and the 1976 Raiders.

Ginn served as Miami's backup running back during their 1971 AFC championship season and their 1972 Super Bowl season. Three games into the 1973 season he was traded to the Colts in exchange for fullback Don Nottingham and a 6th round draft choice. Ginn had been unhappy with his limited playing time with the Dolphins, but received even less playing time with the Colts. He suffered a bone chip in his toe during the season and refused a pain killer injection to be able to play on it. He was waived by the Colts during the 1974 preseason and re-signed by the Dolphins.

After beginning the 1976 season on injured reserve for the Dolphins, Ginn was waived in October. He was signed by the Raiders a few weeks later. Ginn's career ended after becoming a free agent after the 1978 season.

Ginn died on September 21, 2023, at the age of 76.
