= Curtis Johnson (cornerback) =

American football player (born 1948)

No. 45
- Position: Cornerback

Personal information
- Born: June 22, 1948 (age 78); Toledo, Ohio, U.S.
- Listed height: 6 ft 1 in (1.85 m)
- Listed weight: 196 lb (89 kg)

Career information
- High school: Waite (Toledo)
- College: Toledo
- NFL draft: 1970: 4th round, 81st overall pick

Career history
- Miami Dolphins (1970–1978)

Awards and highlights
- 2× Super Bowl champion (VII, VIII); First-team All-American (1969)

Career NFL statistics
- Interceptions: 22
- Interception yards: 190
- Fumble recoveries: 8
- Stats at Pro Football Reference

Curtis Wise Johnson (born June 22, 1948) is an American former professional football player who was a cornerback in the National Football League (NFL). He was selected by the Miami Dolphins in the fourth round of the 1970 NFL draft. He played college football for the Toledo Rockets and high school football for Waite.

== Professional career ==
Johnson was drafted by the Miami Dolphins in the fourth round of the 1970 NFL draft. He played his entire nine-year career for the Dolphins from 1970 to 1978. For his career he started 111 of 125 games, recording 22 interceptions. Johnson also started in three Super Bowls for the Dolphins, winning two of them.

== Personal life ==
After leaving the Dolphins, Johnson remained in Miami. As of 1980, he was a loan administrator at Biscayne Federal Bank.
