= Tim Foley (defensive back) =

American football player (1948–2023)

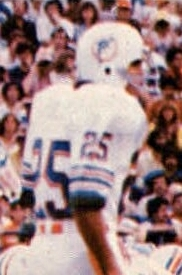
- Foley playing for the Miami Dolphins in 1978

No. 25
- Positions: Cornerback, Safety

Personal information
- Born: January 22, 1948; Evanston, Illinois, U.S.
- Died: September 24, 2023 (aged 75); St. Augustine, Florida, U.S.
- Listed height: 6 ft 0 in (1.83 m)
- Listed weight: 194 lb (88 kg)

Career information
- High school: Loyola Academy (Wilmette, Illinois)
- College: Purdue
- NFL draft: 1970: 3rd round, 55th overall pick

Career history
- Miami Dolphins (1970–1980)

Awards and highlights
- 2× Super Bowl champion (VII, VIII); Pro Bowl (1979); Second-team All-American (1969); 2× Second-team All-Big Ten (1967, 1969)

Career NFL statistics
- Interceptions: 22
- Fumble recoveries: 8
- Total touchdowns: 2
- Stats at Pro Football Reference

Thomas David "Tim" Foley (January 22, 1948 – September 24, 2023) was an American professional football player who was a defensive back for the Miami Dolphins of the National Football League (NFL).

Foley starred at Loyola Academy in Wilmette, Illinois, before playing college football for the Purdue Boilermakers, receiving All-American honors as a defensive back in 1969. He then played 11 seasons (1970–1980) in the NFL, all of which were with the Dolphins. In 1973, he set an NFL record when he returned two blocked punts for touchdowns in a November 11th matchup against the Baltimore Colts. He was named to the Pro Bowl in 1979.

1968 Academic All-America® • 1969 Academic All-America®

Tim Foley was inducted into the CoSIDA Academic All-America® Hall of Fame in 1997.

Foley was an analyst for TBS College Football as well as Miami Dolphins preseason.

Post career he worked as a college football analyst. He also was a Founder Crown Ambassador in the Amway business.

Tim Foley died at his home in St. Augustine, Florida, on September 24, 2023, at the age of 75.
