= Norm Evans =

American football player (born 1942)

No. 73
- Position: Tackle

Personal information
- Born: September 28, 1942 (age 84); Santa Fe, New Mexico, U.S.
- Listed height: 6 ft 5 in (1.96 m)
- Listed weight: 250 lb (113 kg)

Career information
- High school: Donna (Donna, Texas)
- College: TCU
- AFL draft: 1965: 14th round, 106th overall pick

Career history
- Houston Oilers (1965); Miami Dolphins (1966–1975); Seattle Seahawks (1976–1978)

Awards and highlights
- 2× Super Bowl champion (VII, VIII); 2× Pro Bowl (1972, 1974)
- Stats at Pro Football Reference

Norman Earl Evans (born September 28, 1942) is an American former professional football player who was an offensive tackle for 14 seasons in the American Football League (AFL) and National Football League (NFL). Evans is the only player in NFL history to be chosen in two expansion drafts. He played college football for the TCU Horned Frogs. The Miami Dolphins took Evans from the Houston Oilers in the 1966 AFL Expansion draft. He played 10 seasons with Miami. Evans was also chosen by the Seattle Seahawks in the 1976 NFL Expansion Draft and played three seasons there. He was selected to two Pro Bowls and played in three Super Bowls, winning twice, all with the Dolphins.

Norman was born in Santa Fe, New Mexico, but his football playing days began in Donna, Texas, then a small town of 7,500 people with a 2A football team.

== See also ==
- List of American Football League players
