= 1969 Miami Dolphins season =

4th season in franchise history

- Head coach: George Wilson
- Home stadium: Miami Orange Bowl

Results
- Record: 3–10–1
- Division place: 5th AFL Eastern
- Playoffs: Did not qualify
- Pro Bowlers: 5 DE Bill Stanfill; G Larry Little; RB Jim Kiick; C Tom Goode; LB Nick Buoniconti

The 1969 Miami Dolphins season was the team's fourth season, and their final season in the American Football League (AFL). This was the final season for George Wilson as head coach, as Don Shula was hired next season and coached the team for the next 25 seasons until 1995. The team looked to improve on their 5–8–1 record from 1968. However, the Dolphins struggled from the season's start, losing their first 3 games before tying the Oakland Raiders and losing their next 2 games to start the season 0–5–1. After their week 7 win over the Buffalo Bills, the Dolphins would end the season with a 3–10–1 record. Their week 10 loss to the Bills would be the last time the Dolphins lost to them until 1980, as the Dolphins won 20 straight against Buffalo from 1970 to 1979. This became known as "The Streak", as it set an NFL record for the longest winning streak for one team against one opponent, which, as of 2023, is still an NFL record that has not been seriously threatened.

The Dolphins would not have another losing season until the 1976 Season.

== Offseason ==
=== Common draft ===
1969 Miami Dolphins draft
| Round | Pick | Player | Position | College | Notes |
| 1 | 11 | Bill Stanfill * | Defensive end | Georgia | |
| 2 | 37 | Bob Heinz | Defensive tackle | Pacific | |
| 3 | 63 | Mercury Morris * | Running back | West Texas State | |
| 4 | 89 | Norm McBride | Defensive end | Utah | |
| 5 | 115 | Willie Pearson | Defensive back | North Carolina A&T | |
| 5 | 128 | Karl Kremser | Kicker | Tennessee | |
| 6 | 141 | Ed Tuck | Guard | Notre Dame | |
| 7 | 167 | John Egan | Center | Boston College | |
| 7 | 174 | John Kulka | Guard | Penn State | |
| 8 | 193 | Bruce Weinstein | Tight end | Yale | |
| 9 | 219 | Jesse Powell | Linebacker | West Texas State | |
| 10 | 245 | Jim Mertens | Tight end | Fairmont State | |
| 11 | 271 | Mike Berdis | Defensive tackle/Offensive tackle | North Dakota State | |
| 12 | 297 | Dale McCullers | Linebacker | Florida State | |
| 13 | 323 | Amos Ayres | Defensive back | Arkansas AM&N | |
| 14 | 349 | Glenn Thompson | Offensive tackle | Troy State | |
| 15 | 375 | Chick McGeehan | Wide receiver | Tennessee | |
| 16 | 401 | Lloyd Mumphord | Defensive back | Texas Southern | |
| 17 | 427 | Tom Krallman | Defensive end | Xavier | |
Made roster * Made at least one Pro Bowl during career

== Personnel ==
=== Staff ===
1969 Miami Dolphins staff
| Front office: President – Joe Robbie; Director of player personnel – Joe Thomas; Head coaches: Head coach – George Wilson; Offensive coaches: Offensive backs – John Idzik; Offensive line – Ernie Hefferle | Defensive coaches: Defensive line – Les Bingaman; Defensive backs – Tom Keane |

=== Roster ===
1969 Miami Dolphins roster
| Quarterbacks (QB): 11 Rick Norton; 5 John Stofa; Running backs (RB): 39 Larry Csonka; 21 Jim Kiick; 22 Mercury Morris; 31 Barry Pryor; Wide receivers (WR): 16 Tommy Boutwell; 99 Jim Hines; 28 Gene Milton; 89 Karl Noonan; Tight ends (TE): 87 Jim Mertens; 20 Larry Seiple P | Offensive linemen (OL): 71 John Boynton T; 77 Doug Crusan T; 73 Norm Evans T; 58 Tom Goode C; 66 Larry Little G; 63 Billy Neighbors G; 78 Maxie Williams G; Defensive linemen (DL): 75 Manny Fernandez DT; 72 Bob Heinz DT; 53 Norm McBride DE; 74 John Richardson DT; 70 Jim Riley DE; 84 Bill Stanfill DE | Linebackers (LB): 85 Nick Buoniconti MLB; 55 Randy Edmunds OLB; 50 Frank Emanuel MLB; 52 Jimmy Keyes OLB; 54 Dale McCullers OLB; 56 Jesse Powell OLB; 51 Ed Weisacosky OLB; Defensive backs (DB): 40 Dick Anderson FS; 47 Tom Beier SS; 26 Lloyd Mumphord CB; 41 Willie Pearson CB; 48 Bob Petrella SS; 49 Jimmy Warren CB; 25 Dick Westmoreland CB; Special teams (ST): 15 Karl Kremser K | Practice squad: 29 Garry Grady CB; 80 Bob Joswick DE; Reserve: 24 Jack Clancy WR (IR); 83 Jim Cox TE (IR); 42 Bill Darnall WR (IR); 12 Bob Griese QB (IR); 59 Joe Mirto G (IR); 35 Stan Mitchell RB (IR); 82 Doug Moreau TE (IR); 43 Bob Neff S (IR); 62 Ed Tuck G (IR); 81 Howard Twilley WR (IR); 79 Jim Urbanek DT (IR); 61 Fred Woodson G (IR); Rookies in italics |

== Regular season ==
=== Schedule ===
| Week | Date | Opponent | Result | Record | Venue | Attendance | Recap |
|---|---|---|---|---|---|---|---|
| 1 | September 14 | at Cincinnati Bengals | **L** 21–27 | 0–1 | Nippert Stadium | 24,487 | Recap |
| 2 | September 20 | at Oakland Raiders | **L** 17–20 | 0–2 | Oakland-Alameda County Coliseum | 48,477 | Recap |
| 3 | September 28 | at **Houston Oilers** | **L** 10–20 | 0–3 | Houston Astrodome | 40,387 | Recap |
| 4 | October 4 | Oakland Raiders | **T** 20–20 | 0–3–1 | Miami Orange Bowl | 32,668 | Recap |
| 5 | October 11 | San Diego Chargers | **L** 14–21 | 0–4–1 | Miami Orange Bowl | 33,073 | Recap |
| 6 | October 19 | at Kansas City Chiefs | **L** 10–17 | 0–5–1 | Municipal Stadium | 47,038 | Recap |
| 7 | October 26 | **Buffalo Bills** | **W** 24–6 | 1–5–1 | Miami Orange Bowl | 39,194 | Recap |
| 8 | November 2 | at **New York Jets** | **L** 31–34 | 1–6–1 | Shea Stadium | 60,793 | Recap |
| 9 | November 9 | at **Boston Patriots** | **W** 17–16 | 2–6–1 | Alumni Stadium | 10,665 | Recap |
| 10 | November 16 | at **Buffalo Bills** | **L** 3–28 | 2–7–1 | War Memorial Stadium | 32,334 | Recap |
| 11 | November 23 | **Houston Oilers** | **L** 7–32 | 2–8–1 | Miami Orange Bowl | 27,114 | Recap |
| 12 | November 30 | **Boston Patriots** | **L** 23–38 | 2–9–1 | Tampa Stadium | 27,179 | Recap |
| 13 | December 7 | Denver Broncos | **W** 27–24 | 3–9–1 | Miami Orange Bowl | 24,972 | Recap |
| 14 | December 14 | **New York Jets** | **L** 9–27 | 3–10–1 | Miami Orange Bowl | 42,148 | Recap |
Note: Intra-division opponents are in **bold** text.

== Standings ==
AFL Eastern Division
| | W | L | T | PCT | DIV | PF | PA | STK |
|---|---|---|---|---|---|---|---|---|
| New York Jets | 10 | 4 | 0 | .714 | 8–0 | 353 | 269 | W2 |
| Houston Oilers | 6 | 6 | 2 | .500 | 5–3 | 278 | 279 | W1 |
| Boston Patriots | 4 | 10 | 0 | .286 | 3–5 | 266 | 316 | L2 |
| Buffalo Bills | 4 | 10 | 0 | .286 | 2–6 | 230 | 359 | L2 |
| Miami Dolphins | 3 | 10 | 1 | .231 | 2–6 | 233 | 332 | L1 |

Note: Tie games were not officially counted in the standings of the AFL.
