= 1968 Miami Dolphins season =

3rd season in franchise history

- Head coach: George Wilson
- Home stadium: Miami Orange Bowl

Results
- Record: 5–8–1
- Division place: 3rd AFL Eastern
- Playoffs: Did not qualify
- Pro Bowlers: 3 QB Bob Griese; RB Jim Kiick; DE Karl Noonan

The 1968 Miami Dolphins season was the team's third in the American Football League (AFL). The team improved on their 4–10 record from 1967, finishing the season 5–8–1 and moving one place up in the AFL Eastern Division. In week 6 the Dolphins tied the Buffalo Bills, 14–14, the first tie in franchise history.

The last remaining active member of the 1968 Miami Dolphins was quarterback Bob Griese, who retired after the 1980 NFL season.

== Offseason ==
=== Common draft ===
1968 Miami Dolphins draft
Round	Pick	Player	Position	College	Notes
1	8	Larry Csonka * ^{†}	Running back	Syracuse	
1	27	Doug Crusan	Tackle	Indiana	
2	35	Jimmy Keyes	Kicker/Linebacker	Ole Miss	
2	54	Jim Cox	Tight end	Miami (FL)	
3	62	Jim Urbanek	Defensive tackle	Ole Miss	
3	73	Dick Anderson *	Safety	Colorado	
5	118	Jim Kiick *	Running back	Wyoming	
6	142	Kim Hammond	Quarterback	Florida State	
6	146	Jim Hines	Wide receiver	Texas Southern	
7	172	John Boynton	Tackle	Tennessee	
8	217	Randy Edmunds	Linebacker	Georgia Tech	
9	226	Sam McDowell	Defensive tackle	Southwest Missouri State	
9	240	Tom Paciorek	Defensive back	Houston	
10	253	Joe Mirto	Tackle	Miami (FL)	
11	280	Cornelius Cooper	Tackle	Prairie View A&M	
12	307	Paul Paxton	Tackle	Akron	
13	334	Bob Joswick	Defensive end	Tulsa	
14	362	Ray Blunk	Tight end	Xavier	
15	388	Ken Corbin	Linebacker	Miami (FL)	
16	416	Henry Still	Defensive tackle	Bethune-Cookman	
17	442	Bill Nemeth	Center	Arizona	
Made roster † Pro Football Hall of Fame * Made at least one Pro Bowl during career

=== Undrafted free agents ===
1968 undrafted free agents of note
Player	Position	College
Don Cherry	Running back	Wichita State
Sammie Clifton	Quarterback	Northwestern State
Manny Fernandez	Defensive end	Utah
Gene Milton	Wide receiver	Florida A&M
Dan Pavlak	Guard	Tulsa

== Personnel ==
=== Staff / Coaches ===
1968 Miami Dolphins staff
Front office: President – Joe Robbie; Director of player personnel – Joe Thomas; Head coaches: Head coach – George Wilson; Offensive coaches: Offensive backs – John Idzik; Offensive line – Ernie Hefferle	Defensive coaches: Defensive line – Les Bingaman; Defensive backs – Tom Keane

=== Roster ===
1968 Miami Dolphins roster
Quarterbacks (QB): 12 Bob Griese; 15 Kim Hammond; 11 Rick Norton; Running backs (RB): 39 Larry Csonka; 21 Jim Kiick; 30 Sammy Price; 27 Gary Tucker; Wide receivers (WR): 42 Bill Darnall; 99 Jim Hines; 28 Gene Milton; 89 Karl Noonan; 81 Howard Twilley; Tight ends (TE): 82 Doug Moreau; 20 Larry Seiple P	Offensive linemen (OL): 77 Doug Crusan T; 73 Norm Evans T; 71 Charlie Fowler G; 58 Tom Goode C; 63 Billy Neighbors G; 65 Jack Pyburn T; 78 Maxie Williams T/G; 61 Fred Woodson G; Defensive linemen (DL): 86 Mel Branch DE; 84 Ray Jacobs DT; 80 Bob Joswick DE; 76 Tom Nomina DT; 74 John Richardson DT; 70 Jim Riley DE; 79 Jim Urbanek DT	Linebackers (LB): 72 Rudy Barber MLB; 57 John Bramlett OLB; 55 Randy Edmunds OLB; 50 Frank Emanuel MLB; 51 Ed Weisacosky OLB; Defensive backs (DB): 40 Dick Anderson FS; 48 Bob Petrella SS; 49 Jimmy Warren CB; 44 Dick Washington CB/S; 22 Willie West SS; 25 Dick Westmoreland CB; Special teams (ST)	Practice squad: 88 John Boynton TE; 83 Jim Cox TE; 75 Manny Fernandez DE; 29 Jack Harper RB; 52 Jimmy Keyes K; 45 Mack Lamb CB; 59 Joe Mirto G; Reserve: 47 Tom Beier S (Military); 24 Jack Clancy WR (IR); -- Wayne Liddick S (NF-Ill.); 54 Wahoo McDaniel LB (IR); 35 Stan Mitchell RB (IR); 43 Bob Neff S (IR); -- Bud Norris TE (IR); -- Henry Still DT (DNR); Rookies in italics

== Regular season ==
=== Schedule ===
Week	Date	Opponent	Result	Record	Venue	Attendance	Recap
1	Bye						
2	September 14	**Houston Oilers**	**L** 10–24	0–1	Miami Orange Bowl	38,097	Recap
3	September 21	Oakland Raiders	**L** 21–47	0–2	Miami Orange Bowl	28,751	Recap
4	September 28	Kansas City Chiefs	**L** 3–48	0–3	Miami Orange Bowl	27,732	Recap
5	October 6	at **Houston Oilers**	**W** 24–7	1–3	Astrodome	35,424	Recap
6	October 12	**Buffalo Bills**	**T** 14–14	1–3–1	Miami Orange Bowl	28,559	Recap
7	October 20	at Cincinnati Bengals	**W** 24–22	2–3–1	Nippert Stadium	25,076	Recap
8	October 27	at Denver Broncos	**L** 14–21	2–4–1	Mile High Stadium	43,411	Recap
9	November 3	at San Diego Chargers	**L** 28–34	2–5–1	San Diego Stadium	31,686	Recap
10	November 10	at **Buffalo Bills**	**W** 21–17	3–5–1	War Memorial Stadium	28,399	Recap
11	November 17	Cincinnati Bengals	**L** 21–38	3–6–1	Miami Orange Bowl	30,304	Recap
12	November 24	at **Boston Patriots**	**W** 34–10	4–6–1	Fenway Park	13,646	Recap
13	December 1	at **New York Jets**	**L** 17–35	4–7–1	Shea Stadium	60,207	Recap
14	December 8	**Boston Patriots**	**W** 38–7	5–7–1	Miami Orange Bowl	24,242	Recap
15	December 15	**New York Jets**	**L** 7–31	5–8–1	Miami Orange Bowl	31,302	Recap
Note: Intra-division opponents are in **bold** text.

== Standings ==
AFL Eastern Division
	W	L	T	PCT	DIV	PF	PA	STK
New York Jets	11	3	0	.786	7–1	419	280	W4
Houston Oilers	7	7	0	.500	5–3	303	248	W2
Miami Dolphins	5	8	1	.385	4–3–1	276	355	L1
Boston Patriots	4	10	0	.286	2–6	229	406	L2
Buffalo Bills	1	12	1	.077	1–6–1	199	367	L8

Note: Tie games were not officially counted in the standings in the AFL.
