= Jim Kiick =

American football player (1946–2020)

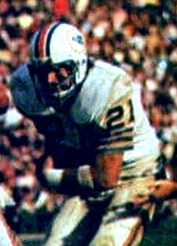
- Kiick playing for the Dolphins in Super Bowl VII

No. 21, 33, 30
- Position: Running back

Personal information
- Born: August 9, 1946; Lincoln Park, New Jersey, U.S.
- Died: June 20, 2020 (aged 73); Wilton Manors, Florida, U.S.
- Listed height: 5 ft 11 in (1.80 m)
- Listed weight: 214 lb (97 kg)

Career information
- High school: Boonton (Boonton, New Jersey)
- College: Wyoming
- NFL draft: 1968: 5th round, 118th overall pick

Career history
- Miami Dolphins (1968–1974); Memphis Southmen (1975); Denver Broncos (1976–1977); Washington Redskins (1977)

Awards and highlights
- 2× Super Bowl champion (VII, VIII); 2× AFL All-Star (1968, 1969); AFL rushing touchdowns leader (1969)

Career NFL/AFL statistics
- Rushing yards: 3,759
- Rushing average: 3.7
- Receptions: 233
- Receiving yards: 2,302
- Total touchdowns: 33
- Stats at Pro Football Reference

James Forrest Kiick (/kɪk/; August 9, 1946 – June 20, 2020) was an American professional football player. He played as a running back for the Miami Dolphins, Denver Broncos, and the Washington Redskins in the American Football League (AFL) from 1968 to 1969 and in the National Football League (NFL) from 1970 through 1977, except for 1975 when he played in the World Football League (WFL).

He was a member of the undefeated 1972 team and was an integral part of the ball-control running game which characterized the Dolphins under head coach Don Shula in the early 1970s. Kiick played in three Super Bowls and is the Dolphins' fourth all-time leading rusher. He and fullback Larry Csonka, known as "Butch Cassidy and the Sundance Kid," in 1973 co-wrote a book, Always on the Run. They shocked the sports world in 1975 when they signed with the newly formed World Football League.

== Early life ==
Born and raised in Lincoln Park, New Jersey, Kiick played football, baseball, and basketball at Boonton High School. He made the All-Morris County team, but as a defensive back, not as a running back, and graduated in 1964. His father, George, a native of Hanover, Pennsylvania, played in the NFL for the Pittsburgh Steelers in 1940 and 1945.

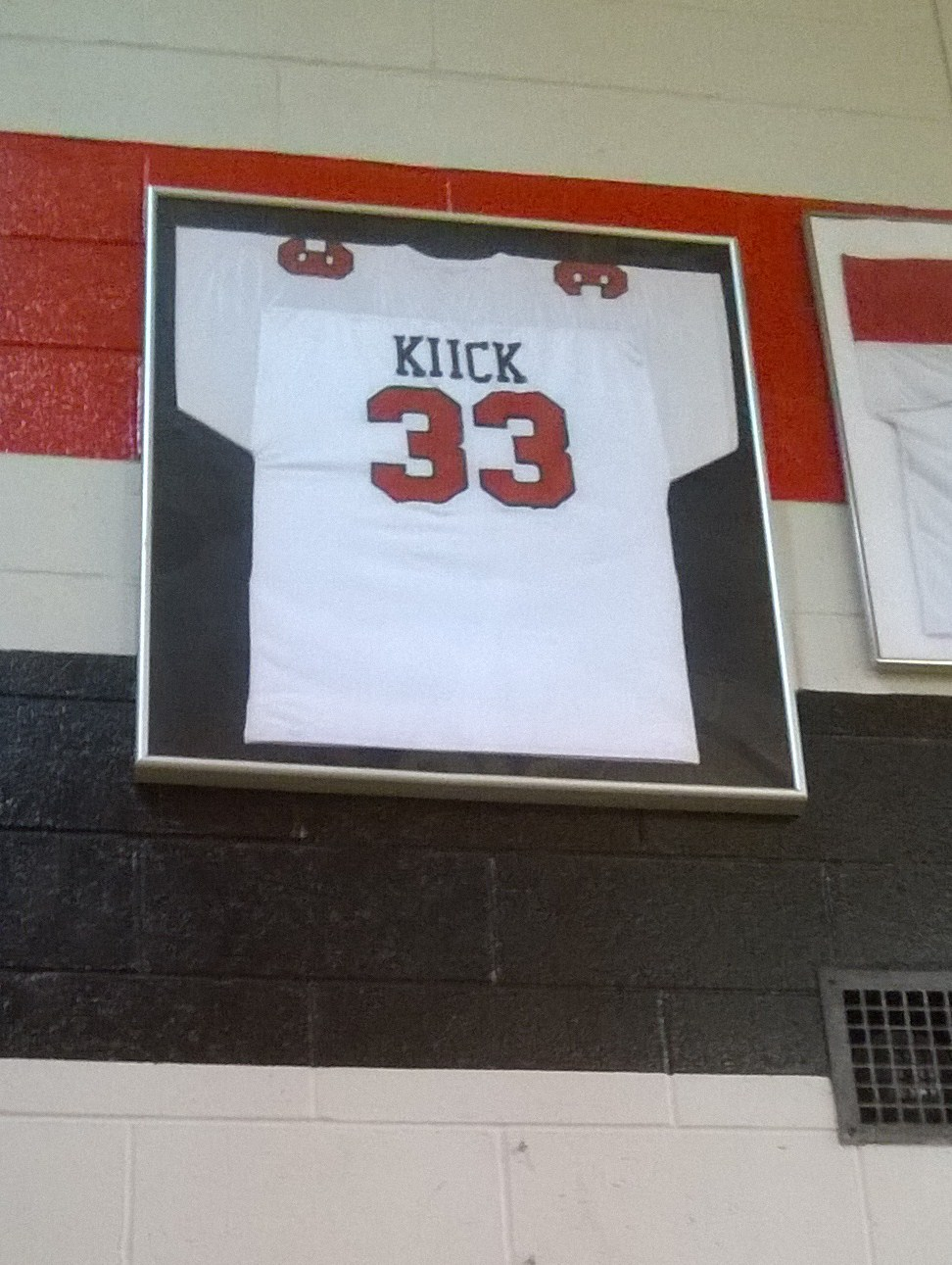
A retired jersey honoring Kiick hangs in the gym at Boonton High School.

== College career ==
After high school in New Jersey, Kiick went west and played college football at Wyoming from 1965 through 1967, and was the Cowboys' leading rusher each of those years. He totalled 1,714 yards and ten touchdowns on 431 carries, and 561 yards and five touchdowns on 52 pass receptions. He was the first player ever to earn first-team All-WAC honors three times. As a junior, he was named the Most Valuable Player in the 1966 Sun Bowl win over Florida State, rushing 25 times for 135 yards and two touchdowns, and catching four passes for 42 yards. Kiick was co-captain of the team as a senior that also featured future NFL star Vic Washington and led undefeated Wyoming to the 1968 Sugar Bowl against LSU, where he rushed 19 times for 75 yards and a touchdown and caught five passes for 48 yards. Wyoming led 13–0 at halftime, but was outplayed in the second half and lost 20–13.

Kiick played in the Senior Bowl, and was selected to play in the 1968 College All-Star Game against the Green Bay Packers in Chicago, where he first met Csonka. (In a foreshadowing of things to come, they went out drinking every night.) Csonka was named the All-Stars' Most Valuable Player, but Kiick never got into the game. He showed up at the All-Stars' training camp out of shape, and the All-Stars' coach, ex-NFL quarterback Norm Van Brocklin, decided Kiick had a bad attitude and benched him.

== Professional career ==
=== Dolphins ===
Kiick was selected by the AFL's Miami Dolphins in the fifth round (118th overall) of the 1968 NFL/AFL draft, the second year of pro football's common draft. Director of Player Personnel Joe Thomas said Kiick was drafted for his "quick feet." He signed a two-year, no-cut contract for $15,000 the first year, $17,000 the second year, plus a $7,000 bonus. He was the primary halfback for the next four years, and missed only one game in that period. Beginning with the 1972 season, he had to share halfback duties with other players, most notably Mercury Morris, as Shula decided a faster back would better complement Csonka. Kiick started only three of 14 regular season games in 1972 as he became primarily a short-yardage and goal-line specialist, although he did start Super Bowl VII at the end of the season.

Although not blessed with breakaway speed, the 5 ft 11 in (1.80 m), 214 lb (97 kg) Kiick was a versatile player; in addition to being an effective inside power runner, he was also an excellent blocker and clutch pass receiver. He had over 1,000 yards combined rushing and receiving in each of his first four years. He was often compared to such well-known all-purpose backs as Paul Hornung, Tom Matte, and his boyhood idol, Frank Gifford. Teammate Jim Langer described him as "a very heady runner and receiver." He played hurt and rarely fumbled. Kiick once played with a broken toe, a broken finger, a hip pointer and a badly bruised elbow. He led the Dolphins in rushing in 1968 (621 yards) and 1969 (575 yards) and was selected for the AFL All-Star game both years. His nine rushing touchdowns in 1969 led the AFL, and his 1,155 total yards from scrimmage in 1970 led the AFC and ranked fifth in the NFL. In 1971, he had his best year as a runner, rushing for 738 yards and three touchdowns. He was the only player to rank in the top 15 in both receptions and rushing yardage in both 1970 and 1971. He led the Dolphins in receiving in 1970 and was second in 1968 and 1971.

Wrote teammate Nick Buoniconti,

"Jim Kiick...loved the game and loved clutch situations--where he was at his best. When we needed a first down on third-and-4 or 5, he'd get it. We might get the ball to him on a short option because there was no one better coming out of the backfield to catch a pass. I've never seen anyone put moves on like him. He'd get a linebacker to lean one way and then go the opposite way. Even when they'd double team, he'd get open."

Kiick negotiated a one-year $32,000 contract during the 1970 training camp after initially being offered $20,000. Kiick and Csonka didn't report to training camp in 1971 during contract negotiations. The Dolphins were offering each player less than $40,000 a year. After two weeks of negotiations, they ended up signing three-year contracts for about $60,000 a year, which was commensurate with what the other stars on the team, such as Paul Warfield, Bob Griese and Nick Buoniconti, were being paid. (They were also fined $2,800 apiece.)

In the longest game in NFL history, the 27-24 double-overtime victory over the Kansas City Chiefs in the 1971 AFC playoffs, Kiick rushed 15 times for 56 yards and scored a touchdown. In the 1972 AFC playoff game against the Cleveland Browns, he rushed 14 times for 50 yards and scored the decisive touchdown. In the 1972 AFC championship game against the Pittsburgh Steelers, he rushed only eight times for 15 yards, but those 15 yards produced two touchdowns, including the decisive one.

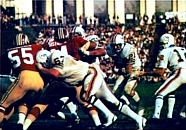
Kiick (center right) rushing the ball in Super Bowl VII.

Kiick played in three consecutive Super Bowls with the Dolphins. In Super Bowl VI, he rushed 10 times for 40 yards, and caught three passes for 21 yards, but the Dolphins failed to score a touchdown and were trounced by the Dallas Cowboys, 24–3. In Super Bowl VII, he caught two passes for six yards, and rushed 12 times for 38 yards, scoring the decisive touchdown, a one-yard blast, as Miami defeated the Washington Redskins 14–7, completing their perfect 17–0 season. In Super Bowl VIII, he rushed seven times for ten yards and scored the second of Miami's three touchdowns, diving in headfirst from the one yard line (his only touchdown of the 1973 season). It was said by Kiick, "my specialty--the one-yard gallop." Miami dominated the Minnesota Vikings, 24–7.

=== Celebrity ===
Kiick and Csonka were roommates at training camp and on the road. Their hell-raising typically included consuming large quantities of alcohol. In 1969, sportswriter Bill Braucher of the Miami Herald - upon hearing of their exploits on and off the field - dubbed them "Butch Cassidy and the Sundance Kid" (Csonka was Sundance, Kiick was Butch). A TV movie was made of their exploits, showing them riding horseback into the sunset on Miami Beach, and they even posed for a poster dressed in western garb.

The Sports Illustrated issue of August 7, 1972, featured a profile of Kiick and Csonka. This issue has become a collector's item because of the cover photograph of Kiick and Csonka by famed SI photographer Walter Iooss, with Csonka making an obscene gesture with the middle finger of his right hand across his left shin. Kiick was such a celebrity in South Florida by the summer of 1972 that a petty criminal (Ron Davis) who bore a passing resemblance to Kiick was able to rent a luxury home on Key Biscayne, make public appearances, and get engaged, passing himself off as Kiick, before being caught.

In 1973, Kiick and Csonka, in collaboration with sportswriter Dave Anderson, published a book, Always on the Run. (A second edition, with an additional chapter covering the 1973 season, Super Bowl VIII, and their signing with the World Football League was published in 1974.) Kiick and Csonka discuss their childhoods, their college football careers, their sometimes stormy relationship with Don Shula, their experiences as pro football players, and the sometimes outrageous behavior of their teammates. There is an extensive discussion of how Kiick lost his starting role to Mercury Morris at the 1972 training camp. The book provides insight into the history of the Dolphins and the state of professional football in the late 1960s and early and mid-1970s. The book was excerpted in the September 1973 issue of Esquire magazine, with Kiick and Csonka on the cover of the magazine, dressed as Old-West dandies.

=== WFL ===
In March 1974, Kiick was selected by the Toronto Northmen who became the Memphis Southmen in the third round (27th overall) of the WFL Pro Draft. In 1975, Kiick and teammates Csonka and Warfield played for the Southmen of the World Football League. Kiick had wanted out of Miami ever since he lost his starting role. The trio's press conference in March 1974 announcing what was then the richest three-player deal in sports was national news and shocked the sports world. They signed three-year guaranteed contracts beginning in 1975 with a total value, including perks, of $3.5 million. Csonka's salary was $1.4 million, Warfield's $900,000, Kiick's $700,000. Each player would also receive a luxury car every year and a three-bedroom luxury apartment.

Then in October 1975, twelve games into its 18-game schedule, the second-year league failed. The Southmen finished 7–4, in second place in the Eastern Division behind the 9–3 Birmingham Vulcans. Kiick led the team in touchdowns (ten), action points (five), and points scored (75). He finished second on the team in rushing, with 121 carries for 462 yards and nine touchdowns, and tied for second with Warfield in receiving, with 25 catches for 259 yards and one touchdown.

=== Broncos and Redskins ===
Following his brief, disappointing, but lucrative detour to the WFL, Kiick stated that he wanted to join Csonka with the New York Giants, but Giants coach Bill Arnsparger, who had been Miami's defensive coordinator, was opposed because he was concerned Kiick would be a bad influence on Csonka. So he returned to the NFL in a back-up role for the Denver Broncos in 1976. He rushed 32 times for 115 yards and one touchdown, and caught 12 passes for 92 yards and a touchdown. Kiick was released during the 1977 regular season and missed out on the Broncos' playoff run to Super Bowl XII. (On the same day he was released by the Broncos, his house burned down and he got divorced.) He was then picked up by the Washington Redskins on December 1, but Kiick played in just one game for them, was waived in June 1978, and then retired.

Kiick ended his AFL/NFL career with 1,029 rushing attempts for 3,759 yards and 29 touchdowns, and 233 pass receptions for 2,302 yards and four touchdowns. He fumbled only 15 times, completed two passes for 38 yards, and ran back a kickoff for 28 yards.

== NFL career statistics ==
Legend
	Led the league
	Won the Super Bowl
**Bold**	Career high

Year	Team	Games		Rushing						Receiving					Fumbles	
Year	Team	GP	GS	Att	Yds	Avg	Y/G	Lng	TD	Rec	Yds	Avg	Lng	TD	Fum	FR
1968	MIA	**14**	13	165	621	3.8	44.4	25	4	**44**	422	9.6	38	0	2	1
1969	MIA	**14**	**14**	180	575	3.2	41.1	27	**9**	29	443	**15.3**	**53**	**1**	2	1
1970	MIA	**14**	13	**191**	658	3.4	47.0	**56**	6	42	**497**	11.8	47	0	**4**	**3**
1971	MIA	13	11	162	**738**	**4.6**	**56.8**	34	3	40	338	8.5	27	0	1	0
1972	MIA	**14**	3	137	521	3.8	37.2	26	5	21	147	7.0	15	**1**	3	0
1973	MIA	**14**	4	76	257	3.4	18.4	32	0	27	208	7.7	22	0	3	0
1974	MIA	**14**	8	86	274	3.2	19.6	15	1	18	155	8.6	19	**1**	–	–
1976	DEN	**14**	0	31	114	3.7	8.1	19	1	10	78	7.8	19	**1**	–	–
1977	DEN	3	0	1	1	1.0	0.3	1	0	2	14	7.0	11	0	–	–
1977	WAS	1	0	Did not record any stats												
Career		115	66	1,029	3,759	3.7	32.7	56	29	233	2,302	9.9	53	4	15	5

== After football ==
Kiick worked as a private investigator for the Broward County Public Defenders Office, and was president of Kiick Sports Promotions in Fort Lauderdale. He was inducted into the University of Wyoming's Athletics Hall of Fame in 1996. He developed dementia and as of 2017 was living at the Independence Hall assisted care facility in Wilton Manors, Florida. His daughter is professional tennis player Allie Kiick.

Jim Kiick died on June 20, 2020, at the age of 73. He was one of at least 345 NFL players to be diagnosed after death with chronic traumatic encephalopathy (CTE), which is caused by repeated hits to the head.

== See also ==
- List of American Football League players
- List of AFL/NFL players with chronic traumatic encephalopathy
