= Super Bowl VIII =

1974 edition of the Super Bowl

Minnesota Vikings (NFC) (12–2)	Miami Dolphins (AFC) (12–2)
7	24
Head coach: Bud Grant	Head coach: Don Shula
	1	2	3	4	Total
MIN	0	0	0	7	7
MIA	14	3	7	0	24
- Date: January 13, 1974
- Kickoff time: 2:30 p.m. CST (UTC-6)
- Stadium: Rice Stadium; Houston, Texas
- MVP: Larry Csonka, fullback
- Favorite: Dolphins by 6.5
- Referee: Ben Dreith
- Attendance: 71,882

Ceremonies
- National anthem: Charley Pride, who also performed "America the Beautiful"
- Coin toss: Ben Dreith
- Halftime show: The University of Texas Longhorn Band, The Westchester Wranglerettes

TV in the United States
- Network: CBS
- Announcers: Ray Scott, Pat Summerall and Bart Starr
- Nielsen ratings: 41.6 (est. 51.7 million viewers)
- Market share: 73
- Cost of 30-second commercial: $103,000

Radio in the United States
- Network: CBS Radio
- Announcers: Andy Musser and Bob Tucker

Super Bowl VIII was an American football game between the National Football Conference (NFC) champion Minnesota Vikings and the American Football Conference (AFC) champion Miami Dolphins to decide the National Football League (NFL) champion for the 1973 season. The Dolphins defeated the Vikings by the score of 24–7 to win their second consecutive Super Bowl, the first team to do so since the Green Bay Packers in Super Bowls I and II, and the first AFL/AFC team to do so. The Dolphins also became the first team to reach three consecutive Super Bowls.

The game was played on January 13, 1974, at Rice Stadium in Houston, Texas. This was the first time the Super Bowl venue was not home to an NFL franchise. At the time, the Astrodome seated just over 50,000, and was considered too small to host a Super Bowl. This was also the first Super Bowl not to be held in either the Los Angeles, Miami or New Orleans areas. It was also the last Super Bowl, and penultimate game overall (the 1974 Pro Bowl in Kansas City played the next week was the last) to feature goal posts at the front of the end zone (they were moved to the endline, in the back of the end zone, the next season).

This was the Dolphins' third consecutive Super Bowl appearance. They posted a 12–2 record during the regular season, then defeated the Cincinnati Bengals and the Oakland Raiders in the playoffs. The Vikings were making their second Super Bowl appearance after also finishing the regular season with a 12–2 record, and posting postseason victories over the Washington Redskins and the Dallas Cowboys.

Super Bowl VIII was largely dominated by the Dolphins, who scored 24 unanswered points during the first three quarters, including two touchdowns on their first two drives. Minnesota's best chance to threaten Miami occurred with less than a minute left in the first half, but Vikings running back Oscar Reed fumbled the ball away at the Dolphins' 6-yard line, and his team was unable to overcome Miami's lead in the second half. Dolphins fullback Larry Csonka became the first running back to be named Super Bowl MVP; both his 145 rushing yards and his 33 carries were Super Bowl records. Csonka broke the previous record for yards rushing (121) and carries (30) set by Matt Snell (who was also a fullback) in Super Bowl III.

As of 2026, this is Miami’s most recent Super Bowl victory, and they currently hold the tenth longest championship drought in the NFL.

== Background ==
=== Host selection process ===
The NFL awarded Super Bowl VIII to Houston on March 21, 1972, at the owners' meetings held in Honolulu. For the first time, multiple Super Bowl sites were selected at a single meeting, as hosts for both VII and VIII were named. Houston became the first Super Bowl host city provided with more than one year to prepare for the game, and lead time has grown substantially in succeeding years. Five cities, Los Angeles, Houston, Miami, Dallas, and New Orleans, prepared serious bids, while San Francisco (Stanford Stadium) withdrew from the running a week prior to the vote. After nine deadlocked votes, Bud Adams recommended awarding two consecutive sites. This compromise mirrored an idea brought up in 1971 by representatives from Miami. Los Angeles won on the ninth ballot and was named host of VII, while second place Houston was named the host for VIII.

=== Miami Dolphins ===
Although the Dolphins were unable to match their 17–0 perfect season of 1972, many sports writers, fans, and Dolphins players themselves felt that the 1973 team was better. While the 1972 team faced no competition in the regular season that had a record of better than 8-6 and/or .500, the 1973 team played against a much tougher schedule, which included games against the Oakland Raiders, Pittsburgh Steelers, and Dallas Cowboys (all playoff teams). Additionally, they played against a resurgent Bills squad which featured 2,000-yard rusher O. J. Simpson, and a Cleveland Browns team that finished over .500. Miami finished with a 12–2 regular season, including their opening game victory over the defending 1972 NFC West champions, the San Francisco 49ers. With this win, the Dolphins tied an NFL record with eighteen consecutive wins. The Dolphins' streak ended in week two with a 12–7 loss to the Raiders in Berkeley, California.

Just like the two previous seasons, Miami's offense relied primarily on its rushing attack. Fullback Larry Csonka recorded his third consecutive 1,000-rushing-yard season (1,003 yards), while running back Mercury Morris rushed for 954 yards and scored 10 touchdowns. Running back Jim Kiick was also a key contributor, rushing for 257 yards and catching 27 passes for 208 yards. Quarterback Bob Griese, the AFC's second-leading passer, completed only 116 passes for 1,422 yards, but threw more than twice as many touchdown passes (17) as interceptions (8), and earned an 84.3 passer rating. He became the first quarterback to start three Super Bowls and is joined by Jim Kelly and Tom Brady as the only quarterbacks to start at least three consecutive Super Bowls. Wide receiver Paul Warfield remained the main deep threat on the team, catching 29 passes for 514 yards and 11 touchdowns. Marlin Briscoe added 30 receptions for 447 yards and 2 scores. The offensive line was strong, once again led by center Jim Langer and right guard Larry Little. Griese, Csonka, Warfield, Langer, Nick Buoniconti and Little would all eventually be elected to the Pro Football Hall of Fame. Bobby Beathard was also elected to the Pro Football Hall of Fame.

Miami's "No Name Defense" continued to dominate their opponents. Future Hall of Fame linebacker Nick Buoniconti recovered three fumbles and returned one for a touchdown. Safety Dick Anderson led the team with eight interceptions, which he returned for 163 yards and two touchdowns on route to winning NFL Defensive Player of the Year. And safety Jake Scott, the previous season's Super Bowl MVP, had four interceptions and 71 return yards. The Dolphins were still using their "53" defense devised at the beginning of the 1971 season, in which Bob Matheson (#53) would be brought in as a fourth linebacker in a 3–4 defense, with Manny Fernandez at nose tackle. Matheson could either rush the passer or drop back into coverage.

=== Minnesota Vikings ===
The Vikings also finished the regular season with a 12–2 record, winning their first nine games before a 20–14 loss on Monday Night Football to the Atlanta Falcons. The Vikings' other loss was a 27–0 shutout in Week 12 to the eventual AFC Central Division Champion Cincinnati Bengals, whom the Dolphins defeated in the AFC divisional playoffs.

Minnesota's offense was led by 13-year veteran quarterback Fran Tarkenton. During the regular season, Tarkenton completed 61.7 percent of his passes for 2,113 yards, 15 touchdowns and just seven interceptions. He also rushed for 202 yards and another touchdown. The team's primary deep threat was Pro Bowl wide receiver John Gilliam, who caught 42 passes for 907 yards, an average of 21.6 yards per catch, and scored eight touchdowns. Tight end Stu Voigt was also a key element of the passing game, with 23 receptions for 318 yards and two touchdowns.

The Vikings' main rushing weapon was NFL Rookie of the Year running back Chuck Foreman, who rushed for 801 yards, caught 37 passes for 362 yards and scored six touchdowns. The Vikings had four other significant running backs – Dave Osborn, Bill Brown, Oscar Reed and future actor Ed Marinaro – who combined for 1,469 rushing/receiving yards and 11 touchdowns. The Vikings' offensive line was also very talented, led by right tackle Ron Yary and six-time Pro Bowl center Mick Tingelhoff.

The Minnesota defense ranked second in the league in fewest points allowed (168) and was again anchored by a defensive line nicknamed the "Purple People Eaters", consisting of defensive tackles Gary Larsen and Alan Page, and defensive ends Jim Marshall and Carl Eller. Behind them, Pro Bowl linebacker Jeff Siemon had 2 interceptions and 2 fumble recoveries. Cornerback Bobby Bryant (seven interceptions, 105 return yards, one touchdown) and safety Paul Krause (four interceptions) led the defensive secondary.

=== Playoffs ===
The Vikings earned their second appearance in the Super Bowl after defeating the wild card Washington Redskins, 27–20, and the NFC East champion Dallas Cowboys, 27–10, in the playoffs. Meanwhile, the Dolphins defeated the AFC Central champion Cincinnati Bengals 34–16 in the divisional round, and the AFC West Champion Oakland Raiders, 27–10 for the AFC Championship. The Dolphins were the first team to appear in three consecutive Super Bowls. Just as in the regular season, Miami relied primarily on their run game in the playoffs, racking up 241 rushing yards against Cincinnati and 266 vs the Raiders. The ground game was particularly crucial against Oakland, as it enabled them to win despite completing just 3 of 6 passes for 34 yards in the game.

=== Super Bowl notes ===
This was the first Super Bowl in which a former AFL franchise was the favorite. The 1970 AFC champion Baltimore Colts had been the favorite in Super Bowl V, but they were an original NFL franchise prior the 1970 merger. Despite Miami being favored, Sports Illustrated predicted a Dolphin loss for the third consecutive year.

This was also the first Super Bowl played in a stadium which was not the current home to an NFL or AFL team, as no team had called Rice Stadium home since the Houston Oilers moved into the Astrodome in 1968. At the time, the Astrodome seated just over 50,000 for football, and was considered too small to host the Super Bowl. It was also the first Super Bowl game played on the then-popular AstroTurf artificial playing surface, not surprising since Houston's Astrodome was the first facility to install AstroTurf in 1966. (Super Bowl V and Super Bowl VI, the first two Super Bowls played on artificial turf were played on the competing Poly-Turf brand.) Indeed, a city in the state of Texas would not host another Super Bowl for exactly 30 years until Super Bowl XXXVIII (also in Houston, at what was then Reliant Stadium).

The Vikings complained about their practice facilities at Houston ISD's Delmar Stadium, a 20-minute bus ride from their hotel. They said that the locker room was cramped, uncarpeted, and had no lockers, and that most of the shower heads did not work (it was later discovered birds had nested there). The practice field had no blocking sleds. "I don't think our players have seen anything like this since junior high school", said Vikings head coach Bud Grant. The Dolphins, meanwhile, trained at the Oilers' facility, since they were an AFC team like Miami.

Having already become the first NFC Central team to even reach the NFC Championship Game, the Vikings became the first non-East Division team from either conference to play in a post-merger Super Bowl.

There were reports of dissension among the Dolphins arising from owner Joe Robbie's decision to allow married players to bring their wives at the club's expense. The single players were reportedly angry that they could not bring their girlfriends, mothers or sisters.

Vikings defensive tackle Alan Page and Dolphins left guard Bob Kuechenberg were former teammates at the University of Notre Dame, including participating in the Game of the Century seven years earlier. Kuechenberg, who would be blocking Page in the game, had sustained a broken arm in a game against the Colts and wore a cast while playing in the Super Bowl. Paul Warfield entered the game with a well-publicized hamstring injury to his left leg.

On television before the game, New York Jets quarterback Joe Namath said, "If Miami gets the kickoff and scores on the opening drive, the game is over.". Indeed, the Dolphins became the first team to score a touchdown after receiving the game's opening kickoff.

The Dolphins, who were designated as the home team, were obligated by a now-defunct policy to wear their aqua jerseys despite having normally worn white jerseys for home games (though Miami wore aqua for its final two regular-season home games vs. the Pittsburgh Steelers and Detroit Lions). Also, the Dolphins wore two slightly different helmet decals; some had the decal which the team had previously used in the 1967 season (Bob Griese's rookie year) and would permanently adopt in 1974 (mostly linemen; with the mascot dolphin leaping through the sun), while others had the decal used in 1966 and again from 1968 to 1973 (with the mascot dolphin halfway through the sun).

Famed "Gonzo" writer Hunter S. Thompson covered the game for Rolling Stone magazine, and his exploits in Houston are legendary.

This was the only Super Bowl in which the game ball had white stripes. At the time, the league permitted striped footballs for night games, late afternoon games, indoor games, and other special situations. The NFL ended the use after the 1975 season, as the stripes were slippery and made the ball more difficult to throw.

Head linesman Leo Miles was the first African-American to officiate in a Super Bowl.

== Broadcasting ==
The game was televised in the United States by CBS with play-by-play announcer Ray Scott and color commentators Pat Summerall and Bart Starr. This was Scott's final telecast for CBS. Midway through the following season Summerall would take Scott's place as the network's lead play-by-play announcer, holding the position through 1993, when CBS lost rights to the NFC television package to Fox.

This is the earliest surviving Super Bowl where the complete original broadcast exists on videotape. Earlier Super Bowls (such as III, V, VI, and VII) had most of the action preserved on videotape but had a portion of the game missing. All Super Bowls from here on out would be preserved in their entirety.

== Entertainment ==
The Longhorn Band from the University of Texas at Austin performed during the pregame festivities. Later, country music singer Charley Pride sang "America the Beautiful" and the national anthem. This game marked the first time that "America the Beautiful" was performed before a Super Bowl game.

The halftime show also featured the Longhorn Band, along with Judy Mallett, Miss Texas 1973, playing the fiddle, in a tribute to American music titled "A Musical America".

The pre-game party was held on the floor of the Astrodome the night before the game. It was attended by the players, the coaches, media, and celebrities. Entertainment was provided by The La France Sisters and Charley Pride.

== Game summary ==
The Dolphins' game plan on offense was to use misdirection, negative-influence traps, and cross-blocking to exploit the Minnesota defense's excellent pursuit. (The Kansas City Chiefs had used similar tactics against the same Vikings defensive line in Super Bowl IV). Wrote Jim Langer, "All this was successful right away. We kept ripping huge holes into their defense and Csonka kept picking up good yardage, especially to the right. We'd hear Alan [Page] cussing because those negative-influence plays were just driving him nuts. He didn't know what the hell to do." On defense, the Dolphins' goal was to neutralize Chuck Foreman by using cat-quick Manny Fernandez at nose tackle and to make passing difficult for Tarkenton by knocking down his receivers and double-teaming John Gilliam. They were also depending on defensive ends Bill Stanfill and Vern Den Herder to contain Tarkenton's scrambling. Coach Don Shula wrote, "In the case of Tarkenton we wanted to hem him in. In the case of Page, Eller and company, we wanted to try to turn their aggressiveness to our advantage. We decided to emphasize negative influence by misdirection and cross blocking, trying to make the Vikings Front Four commit to the influence of the play and then actually running it elsewhere. The Vikings responded as we anticipated. Then later in the game we found that the Vikings started hesitating, reducing their charge. When they did that, we beat them with straight blocking."

=== First quarter ===
As they had in the two previous Super Bowls, the Dolphins won the coin toss and elected to receive. The Dolphins dominated the Vikings right from the beginning, scoring touchdowns on two 10-play drives in the first quarter. Said center Jim Langer, "It was obvious from the beginning that our offense could overpower their defense." The two drives were very similar, both containing 8 rushes, 2 passes (both of which were complete), one third-down conversion, and four first downs picked up, while Miami did not get penalized. First, Dolphins safety Jake Scott gave his team good field position by returning the opening kickoff 31 yards to the Miami 38-yard line. Then running back Mercury Morris ran right for four yards, fullback Larry Csonka crashed through the middle for two, and quarterback Bob Griese completed a 13-yard pass to tight end Jim Mandich to advance the ball to the Vikings 43-yard line. Csonka then ran on second down for 16 yards (his longest run of the game), then Griese completed a 6-yard pass to wide receiver Marlin Briscoe to the 21-yard line. Three more running plays, two by Csonka and one by Morris, moved the ball to the Vikings 5-yard line. Csonka then finished the drive with a 5-yard touchdown run.

Minnesota's offense started well on the first play with a five-yard run by Chuck Foreman. But the Dolphins were already leading, with Tarkenton behind before running any play, and now Miami's No-Name Defense responded when Foreman ran again and was stopped for no gain. It seemed predictable when Tarkenton's first pass had Foreman as the target, and Manny Fernandez made the stop one yard short of the first down. After three plays and out, punter Mike Eischeid's kick went only 34 yards. Scott fumbled the return, but quickly recovered the ball at the Miami 44, giving the Dolphins better field position than the opening drive. The Dolphins then went 56 yards in 10 plays (aided with three runs by Csonka for a total of 28 yards, and Griese's 13-yard pass to Briscoe) to score on running back Jim Kiick's 1-yard touchdown run (his only touchdown of the season) to extend their lead to 14–0.

By the time the first quarter ended, Miami had run 20 plays for 118 yards and eight first downs, and scored touchdowns on their first two possessions, with Csonka carrying eight times for 64 yards and Griese completing all four of his passes for 40 yards. Meanwhile, the Miami defense held the Minnesota offense to only 25 yards, six plays from scrimmage, and one first down. The Vikings advanced only as far as their own 27-yard line. The Dolphins set the record which still stands for the largest Super Bowl lead (14 points) at the end of the first quarter. It has since been tied by the Oakland Raiders against the Philadelphia Eagles in Super Bowl XV (led 14–0) and the Green Bay Packers against the Pittsburgh Steelers in Super Bowl XLV (led 14–0).

=== Second quarter ===
The situation never got much better for the Vikings the rest of the game. After the first three possessions of the second period ended in punts, Miami mounted a seven-play drive starting from their own 34-yard line. On the first play of the drive, Minnesota linebacker Wally Hilgenberg was flagged for a 15-yard personal foul penalty, putting the ball at the Vikings' 49-yard line. On the previous series, Hilgenberg had thrown an elbow through Csonka's facemask, cutting Csonka above the eye, but had not been penalized. Later in the drive, Morris ran for 10 yards on 3rd-and-inches from the Minnesota 40-yard line to allow Miami to get into field goal range. The drive stalled at the Minnesota 20, forcing Miami to settle for kicker Garo Yepremian's 28-yard field goal to increase their lead to 17–0 midway through the quarter.

The Vikings then had their best opportunity to score in the first half on their ensuing drive. Starting at their own 20-yard line, Minnesota marched to the Miami 15-yard line in nine plays, aided by quarterback Fran Tarkenton's two completions to tight end Stu Voigt for 31 yards and wide receiver John Gilliam's 30-yard reception on 3rd-and-9 (the longest play of the game). Tarkenton's 8-yard run on first down then advanced the ball to the Miami 7, but on the next two plays, Vikings running back Oscar Reed gained only 1 yard on two rushes, bringing up a 4th-and-1 with less than a minute left in the half. Instead of kicking a field goal, Minnesota attempted to convert the fourth down with another running play by Reed, but Reed was stripped of the ball by linebacker Nick Buoniconti before he could pick up the first down, turning the ball back over to the Dolphins to end the half. About the decision to run with Reed on three straight plays, Grant defended the decision since the Vikings twice had converted in the NFC title game against Dallas. "If it's less than a yard, we go for it", he said. "We feel we have the plays to make it." The Dolphins, however, made the stop where the Cowboys had not.

Langer wrote that at halftime, "We definitely knew that this game was over."

=== Third quarter ===
Gilliam returned the second half kickoff 65 yards, but this was nullified by a clipping penalty on Voigt, moving the ball back to the Minnesota 11-yard line. Two plays later, Tarkenton was sacked for a 6-yard loss by Miami defensive tackle Manny Fernandez, forcing Minnesota to punt from their own 7-yard line. Scott then returned the punt 12 yards to the Minnesota 43-yard line.

Miami's first possession of the half led to a 43-yard, eight-play scoring drive. The key play was Griese's 27-yard pass to wide receiver Paul Warfield on 3rd-and-5 to the Minnesota 11-yard line. It was Griese's last pass of the game, his only pass of the second half and just the seventh overall, and only Warfield's second, and last, catch of the game. (Because of his hamstring injury, Warfield had earlier been limping through primarily decoy routes.) On 3rd-and-4 from the Minnesota 5, cornerback Bobby Bryant sacked Morris for an 8-yard loss, but a defensive holding penalty on Hilgenberg gave Miami a new set of downs at the 8. Two plays later, Csonka scored on a 2-yard touchdown run, increasing the Dolphins' lead to 24–0 with nine minutes left in the period. On the scoring play, Griese forgot the snap count at the line of scrimmage. He asked Csonka, who said "two." Kiick said, "No, it's one." Griese chose to believe Csonka, which was a mistake; it was "one." Griese bobbled the ball slightly, but still managed to get it to Csonka.

After an exchange of punts, Minnesota got the ball back at their 43-yard line after Larry Seiple's kick went just 24 yards.

=== Fourth quarter ===
The Vikings got on the board with a 10-play, 57-yard drive, with Tarkenton completing 5 passes for 43 yards, including a 15-yarder to Voigt on 3rd-and-8, and finished the drive himself with a 4-yard touchdown run, cutting Minnesota's deficit to 24–7. This was the first rushing touchdown by a quarterback in Super Bowl history.

Minnesota recovered the ensuing onside kick, but an offside penalty on the Vikings nullified the play, and they subsequently kicked deep. Miami went three-and-out, but Seiple boomed a 57-yard punt and Minnesota got the ball back at their own 3-yard line. Eight plays later, the Vikings reached the Miami 32-yard line, aided by the only penalty charged to Miami in the game (4 yards for pass interference on cornerback Tim Foley) and a 27-yard reception by running back Ed Marinaro. But after two incomplete passes, Tarkenton's pass intended for wide receiver Jim Lash was intercepted by Dolphins cornerback Curtis Johnson at the goal line and returned to Miami's 10 with 6:24 left in the game. Csonka and Kiick were the ball carriers on all 12 remaining plays. The Dolphins picked up two first downs by rush and two by penalty on Vikings defensive tackle Alan Page in running out the clock. With less than four minutes left in the game, a frustrated Page delivered a late hit on Griese, and was assessed a personal foul penalty. Two plays later, both Page and Dolphins guard Bob Kuechenberg were given offsetting personal fouls after getting into a scuffle with each other. Page finished venting out his frustration by committing an offside penalty, while Miami advanced to the Minnesota 29 to run out the clock and claim their second consecutive Super Bowl title.

Wrote Langer, "We just hit the Vikings defense so hard and so fast that they didn't know what hit them. Alan Page later said he knew we would dominate them after only the first couple of plays."

Griese finished the game with just six out of seven pass completions for 73 yards. Miami's seven pass attempts were the fewest ever thrown by a team in the Super Bowl. The Dolphins rushed for 196 yards, did not have any turnovers, and were not penalized in the first 52 minutes. Tarkenton set what was then a Super Bowl record for completions, 18 out of 28 for 182 yards, with one interception, and rushed for 17 yards and a touchdown. Reed was the leading rusher for the Vikings, but with just 32 yards. Voigt was the top receiver of the game with three catches for 46 yards. The Vikings' lethargic performance in this game was very similar to their performance in their loss to the Kansas City Chiefs in Super Bowl IV, as a single touchdown was the only scoring play for the Vikings in both Super Bowls.

=== Box score ===
Super Bowl VIII: Miami Dolphins 24, Minnesota Vikings 7

Quarter	1	2	3	4	Total
Vikings (NFC)	0	0	0	7	7
Dolphins (AFC)	14	3	7	0	24

at Rice Stadium, Houston, Texas

- Date: January 13, 1974
- Game time: 2:30 p.m. CST
- Game weather: 50 °F (10 °C), overcast

Scoring summary

Quarter	Time	Drive			Team	Scoring information	Score	
Quarter	Time	Plays	Yards	TOP	Team	Scoring information	MIN	MIA
1	9:33	10	62	5:27	MIA	Larry Csonka 5-yard touchdown run, Garo Yepremian kick good	0	7
1	1:22	10	56	5:46	MIA	Jim Kiick 1-yard touchdown run, Yepremian kick good	0	14
2	6:02	7	44	4:01	MIA	28-yard field goal by Yepremian	0	17
3	8:44	8	43	3:58	MIA	Csonka 2-yard touchdown run, Yepremian kick good	0	24
4	13:25	10	57	3:09	MIN	Fran Tarkenton 4-yard touchdown run, Fred Cox kick good	7	24
"TOP" = time of possession. For other American football terms, see Glossary of American football.							7	24

== Final statistics ==
Sources: NFL.com Super Bowl VIII, Super Bowl VIII Play Finder Mia, Super Bowl VIII Play Finder Min

=== Statistical comparison ===
	Minnesota Vikings	Miami Dolphins
First downs	14	21
First downs rushing	5	13
First downs passing	8	4
First downs penalty	1	4
Third down efficiency	8/15	4/11
Fourth down efficiency	0/1	1/1
Net yards rushing	72	196
Rushing attempts	24	53
Yards per rush	3.0	3.7
Passing – Completions/attempts	18/28	6/7
Times sacked-total yards	2–16	1–10
Interceptions thrown	1	0
Net yards passing	166	63
Total net yards	238	259
Punt returns-total yards	0–0	3–20
Kickoff returns-total yards	4–69	2–47
Interceptions-total return yards	0–0	1–10
Punts-average yardage	5–42.2	3–39.6
Fumbles-lost	2–1	1–0
Penalties-total yards	7–65	1–4
Time of possession	26:15	33:45
Turnovers	2	0

=== Individual statistics ===
Vikings passing
	C/ATT^{1}	Yds	TD	INT	Rating
Fran Tarkenton	18/28	182	0	1	67.9
Vikings rushing
	Car^{2}	Yds	TD	LG^{3}	Yds/Car
Oscar Reed	11	32	0	9	2.91
Chuck Foreman	7	18	0	5	2.57
Fran Tarkenton	4	17	1	8	4.25
Ed Marinaro	1	3	0	3	3.00
Bill Brown	1	2	0	2	2.00
Vikings receiving
	Rec^{4}	Yds	TD	LG^{3}	Target^{5}
Chuck Foreman	5	27	0	10	7
John Gilliam	4	44	0	30	4
Stu Voigt	3	46	0	17	4
Ed Marinaro	2	39	0	27	2
Bill Brown	1	9	0	9	1
Doug Kingsriter	1	9	0	9	2
Jim Lash	1	9	0	9	5
Oscar Reed	1	–1	0	–1	3

Dolphins passing
	C/ATT^{1}	Yds	TD	INT	Rating
Bob Griese	6/7	73	0	0	110.1
Dolphins rushing
	Car^{2}	Yds	TD	LG^{3}	Yds/Car
Larry Csonka	33	145	2	16	4.39
Mercury Morris	11	34	0	14	3.09
Jim Kiick	7	10	1	5	1.43
Bob Griese	2	7	0	5	3.50
Dolphins receiving
	Rec^{4}	Yds	TD	LG^{3}	Target^{5}
Paul Warfield	2	33	0	27	2
Jim Mandich	2	21	0	13	2
Marlin Briscoe	2	19	0	13	3

^{1}Completions/attempts ^{2}Carries ^{3}Long gain ^{4}Receptions ^{5}Times targeted

=== Records set ===
The following records were set or tied in Super Bowl VIII, according to the official NFL.com boxscore and the ProFootball reference.com game summary. Some records have to meet NFL minimum number of attempts to be recognized. The minimums are shown (in parentheses).

Player records set in Super Bowl VIII
Passing records
Most completions, game	18	Fran Tarkenton (Minnesota)
Rushing records
Most yards, game	145	Larry Csonka (Miami)
Most yards, career	297	Larry Csonka (Miami)
Most attempts, game	33	Larry Csonka (Miami)
Most attempts, career	57	Larry Csonka (Miami)
Highest average gain, career (20 attempts)	5.2 yards (297–57)	Larry Csonka (Miami)
Combined yardage records ^{†}
Most attempts, career	60	Larry Csonka (Miami)
Most yards gained, career	314	Larry Csonka (Miami)
Fumbles
Most fumbles recovered, game	2	Jake Scott (Miami)
Most fumbles recovered, career	2	Jake Scott (Miami)
Special Teams
Most punt return yards gained, career	45	Jake Scott (Miami)
Most punts, career	15	Larry Seiple (Miami)
Records tied
Most touchdowns, game	2	Larry Csonka
Most rushing touchdowns, game	2	Larry Csonka
Most touchdowns, career	2	Larry Csonka; Jim Kiick (Miami)
Most rushing touchdowns, career	2	Larry Csonka; Jim Kiick (Miami)
Most fumbles, game	1	Fran Tarkenton; Oscar Reed (Minnesota)
Most fumbles, game	1	Jake Scott (Miami)
Most punt returns, career	6	Jake Scott

- † This category includes rushing, receiving, interception returns, punt returns, kickoff returns, and fumble returns.

Team records
Most Super Bowl appearances	3	Dolphins
Most consecutive Super Bowl appearances	3	Dolphins
Most Super Bowl losses	2	Vikings
Points
Most points scored, first half	17	Dolphins
Most points, first quarter	14	Dolphins
Largest lead, end of first quarter	14	Dolphins
Largest halftime margin	17	Dolphins
Largest lead, end of 3rd quarter	24	Dolphins
Rushing
Most rushing attempts	53	Dolphins
Passing
Fewest passing attempts	7	Dolphins
Fewest passes completed	6	Dolphins
Fewest yards passing (net)	63	Dolphins
Most passes completed	18	Vikings
First Downs
Fewest first downs passing	4	Dolphins
Punt returns
Fewest punt returns, game	0	Vikings
Records tied
Most Super Bowl victories	2	Dolphins
Most consecutive Super Bowl victories	2	Dolphins
Most points scored in any quarter of play	14 (1st)	Dolphins
Most rushing touchdowns	3	Dolphins
Most first downs, penalty	4	Dolphins
Fewest turnovers, game	0	Dolphins
Fewest punts, game	3	Dolphins
Fewest points, first half	0	Vikings
Fewest passing touchdowns	0	Vikings; Dolphins

Turnovers are defined as the number of times losing the ball on interceptions and fumbles.

Records, both team totals
	Total	Dolphins	Vikings
Points, Both Teams
Most points, first quarter	14	14	0
Field Goals, Both Teams
Fewest field goals attempted	1	1	0
Rushing, both teams
Most rushing attempts	77	53	24
Most rushing touchdowns	4	3	1
Passing, Both Teams
Fewest passing attempts	35	7	28
Records tied, both team totals
Fewest times intercepted	1	0	1
Fewest passing touchdowns	0	0	0
Most first downs rushing	18	13	5
Most first downs, penalty	5	4	1
Fewest interceptions by	1	0	1
Fewest Turnovers	2	0	2

== Super Bowl postgame news and notes ==
In the Dolphins' locker room after the game, Csonka was asked about his battered face. Without naming Hilgenberg, he said, "It was a cheap shot, but an honest cheap shot. He came right at me and threw an elbow right through my mask. I could see the game meant something to him."

With their 32–2 record over two years, the still-young Dolphins appeared to have established a dynasty. In 1974, however, their offense was hurt by injuries to Csonka and the offensive line, and the defense was hurt by the departure of defensive coordinator Bill Arnsparger who became the New York Giants head coach. The Dolphins finished 11–3 but lost a dramatic playoff game ("The Sea of Hands") to the Oakland Raiders. In 1975 Csonka, Kiick, and Warfield left to join the World Football League. The Dolphins would not win another playoff game until 1982, and they have not won a Super Bowl since. They would appear in but lose two more, XVII and XIX.

Jim Langer ended his career with the Vikings in 1981, allowing him to play for his hometown franchise. Langer lost his starting center job in 1980 to Dwight Stephenson, who like Langer is a member of the Hall of Fame.

== Starting lineups ==
Hall of Fame‡

Minnesota	Position	Miami
Offense
Carroll Dale	WR	Paul Warfield‡
Grady Alderman	LT	Wayne Moore
Ed White	LG	Bob Kuechenberg
Mick Tingelhoff‡	C	Jim Langer‡
Frank Gallagher	RG	Larry Little‡
Ron Yary‡	RT	Norm Evans
Stu Voigt	TE	Jim Mandich
John Gilliam	WR	Marlin Briscoe
Fran Tarkenton‡	QB	Bob Griese‡
Chuck Foreman	RB	Mercury Morris
Oscar Reed	RB	Larry Csonka‡
Defense
Carl Eller‡	LE	Vern Den Herder
Gary Larsen	LT	Manny Fernandez
Alan Page‡	RT	Bob Heinz
Jim Marshall	RE	Bill Stanfill
Roy Winston	LLB	Doug Swift
Jeff Siemon	MLB	Nick Buoniconti‡
Wally Hilgenberg	RLB	Mike Kolen
Nate Wright	LCB	Lloyd Mumphord
Bobby Bryant	RCB	Curtis Johnson
Jeff Wright	LS	Dick Anderson
Paul Krause‡	RS	Jake Scott

== Officials ==
- Referee: Ben Dreith (#12) first Super Bowl
- Umpire: Ralph Morcroft (#15) second Super Bowl (II)
- Head linesman: Leo Miles (#35) first Super Bowl
- Line judge: Jack Fette (#39) second Super Bowl (V)
- Back judge: Stan Javie (#29) second Super Bowl (II)
- Field judge: Fritz Graf (#34) second Super Bowl (V)
- Alternate referee: Dick Jorgensen (#60) later was an alternate for Super Bowl XV and worked Super Bowl XXIV on field
- Alternate umpire: Frank Sinkovitz (#20) later worked Super Bowl XV on field

Note: A seven-official system was not used until the 1978 season.

Leo Miles was the first African-American to officiate in a Super Bowl.
