= Super Bowl VII =

1973 Edition of the Super Bowl

Miami Dolphins (AFC) (14–0)	Washington Redskins (NFC) (11–3)
14	7
Head coach: Don Shula	Head coach: George Allen
	1	2	3	4	Total
MIA	7	7	0	0	14
WAS	0	0	0	7	7
- Date: January 14, 1973
- Kickoff time: 12:49 p.m. PST(UTC-8)
- Stadium: Los Angeles Memorial Coliseum; Los Angeles, California
- MVP: Jake Scott, safety
- Favorite: Redskins by 1
- Referee: Tom Bell
- Attendance: 90,182

Ceremonies
- National anthem: Little Angels of Holy Angels Church, Chicago
- Coin toss: Tom Bell (went to Miami)
- Halftime show: Woody Herman, Andy Williams and the Michigan Marching Band

TV in the United States
- Network: NBC
- Announcers: Curt Gowdy, Al DeRogatis, and Bill Enis
- Nielsen ratings: 42.7 (est. 53.32 million viewers)
- Market share: 72
- Cost of 30-second commercial: $88,000

Radio in the United States
- Network: NBC Radio
- Announcers: Jim Simpson and Kyle Rote

Super Bowl VII was an American football game between the American Football Conference (AFC) champion Miami Dolphins and the National Football Conference (NFC) champion Washington Redskins to decide the National Football League (NFL) champion for the 1972 season. The Dolphins defeated the Redskins by the score of 14–7, winning their first Super Bowl, and became the first and still the only team in modern NFL history to complete a perfect undefeated season. They also remain the only Super Bowl champion to win despite having been shut out in the second half of the game. The game was played on January 14, 1973, at the Los Angeles Memorial Coliseum in Los Angeles, the second time the Super Bowl was played in that city. At kickoff, the temperature was 84 °F (29 °C), making the game the warmest Super Bowl.

This was the Dolphins' second Super Bowl appearance; they had lost Super Bowl VI to Dallas the previous year. The Dolphins posted an undefeated 14–0 regular season record before defeating the Cleveland Browns and Pittsburgh Steelers in the playoffs. The Redskins were making what would be the first of five Super Bowl appearances in a 20-year period, after posting an 11–3 regular season record and playoff victories over the Green Bay Packers and Dallas Cowboys. Despite being undefeated, the Dolphins were actually one-point underdogs, largely based on the weakness of their regular season schedule (and losing the previous Super Bowl).

Super Bowl VII was largely dominated by the Dolphins, and is the second-lowest-scoring Super Bowl to date with a total of only 21 points (three touchdowns and three extra points), behind only the 13–3 score of Super Bowl LIII. The only real drama occurred during the final minutes of the game, in what was later known as "Garo's Gaffe". Miami attempted to cap their 17–0 perfect season with a 17–0 shutout by means of a 42-yard field goal by Garo Yepremian, but instead the game and the season was jeopardized when his kick was blocked. Instead of falling on the loose ball, the Dolphins kicker picked it up, attempted a forward pass, but batted it in the air, and Redskins cornerback Mike Bass (who was Yepremian's former teammate on the Detroit Lions years earlier) caught it and returned it 49 yards for a touchdown. This remains the longest period in a Super Bowl for one team to be shut out, as Washington was held scoreless until 2:07 remained in the fourth quarter. (Note: The previous Super Bowl with the longest period for being shut out was in 1969, where the Jets held the Colts scoreless until 3:19 left in the game. Don Shula was head coach on the losing side that time, so he held the record for the longest period to be held under a shut out as well as the longest period to hold a shut out.) Because of the turnover and score, what was a Miami-dominated game became close, and the Dolphins had to stop Washington's final drive for the tying touchdown as time expired.

Dolphins safety Jake Scott was named Most Valuable Player. He recorded two interceptions for 63 return yards, including a 55-yard return from the end zone during the fourth quarter. Scott became the second defensive player in Super Bowl history (after linebacker Chuck Howley in Super Bowl V) to earn a Super Bowl MVP award.

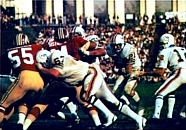
Jim Kiick (center right) rushing the ball for Miami in Super Bowl VII.

== Background ==
=== Host selection process ===
The NFL awarded Super Bowl VII to Los Angeles on March 21, 1972, at the owners' meetings held in Honolulu. For the first time, multiple Super Bowl sites were selected at a single meeting, as hosts for both VII and VIII were named. Five cities, Los Angeles, Houston, Miami, Dallas, and New Orleans, prepared serious bids, while San Francisco (Stanford Stadium) withdrew from the running a week prior to the vote. After nine deadlocked votes, Oilers owner Bud Adams recommended awarding two consecutive sites. This compromise mirrored an idea brought up in 1971 by representatives from Miami. Los Angeles won on the ninth ballot, while second place Houston was named the host for VIII. In order to accommodate the game, the Pro Bowl was shifted from Los Angeles Memorial Coliseum to Texas Stadium for 1973.

=== Miami Dolphins ===
The Dolphins went undefeated during the season, despite losing their starting quarterback. In the fifth game of the regular season, starter Bob Griese suffered a fractured right leg and dislocated ankle. In his place, 38-year-old Earl Morrall, a 17-year veteran, led Miami to victory in their nine remaining regular season games, and was the 1972 NFL Comeback Player of the Year. Morrall had previously played for Dolphins head coach Don Shula when they were both with the Baltimore Colts, where Morrall backed up quarterback Johnny Unitas and started in Super Bowl III.

But Miami also had the same core group of young players who had helped the team advance to the previous year's Super Bowl VI. (The only Dolphins starter in Super Bowl VII over the age of 30 was 32-year-old Nick Buoniconti.) The Dolphins still had a powerful running attack, spearheaded by running backs Larry Csonka, Jim Kiick and Eugene "Mercury" Morris. (Morris, who in previous seasons had been used primarily as a kick returner, took over the starting halfback position from Kiick, who had been the starter the previous four years. However, the more-experienced Kiick would start in Super Bowl VII.) Csonka, who had the best season of his career, led the team with 1,117 yards and six touchdowns. Kiick contributed 521 yards and five touchdowns, and also caught 21 passes for 147 yards and another touchdown. Morris, a breakaway runner, rushed for exactly 1,000 yards, caught 15 passes for 168 yards, added another 334 yards returning kickoffs, and scored a league-leading 12 rushing touchdowns. Overall, Miami set a record with 2,960 total rushing yards during the regular season, and became the first team ever to have two players rush for 1,000 yards in one season. Miami led the NFL in points scored (385). Since 1972, only six other teams have had two 1,000 yard rushers in the same backfield, but the Dolphins are the only one of those seven to make it to and win the Super Bowl.

Receiver Paul Warfield once again provided the run-based Dolphins with an effective deep-threat option, catching 29 passes for 606 yards, an average of 20.9 yards per catch. Miami's offensive line, led by undrafted future Hall of Famers Jim Langer and Larry Little, was also a key factor in the Dolphins' offensive production. Miami's "No-Name Defense" (a nickname inspired by Dallas Cowboys head coach Tom Landry when he could not recall the names of any Dolphins defenders just before Super Bowl VI), led by future Hall of Fame linebacker Nick Buoniconti, allowed the fewest points in the league during the regular season (171), and ranked second in the NFL with 26 interceptions. Safety Jake Scott recorded five interceptions, while Lloyd Mumphord had four picks and safety Dick Anderson had three interceptions and led the NFL with five fumble recoveries. Because of injuries to defensive linemen (at the beginning of the season the Dolphins were down to four healthy players at the position), defensive coordinator Bill Arnsparger created what he called the "53" defense, in which the versatile Bob Matheson (number 53) would be used as either a defensive end in the standard 4–3 defense or as a fourth linebacker in a 3–4 defense, with Manny Fernandez at nose tackle. As a linebacker, Matheson would either rush or drop back into coverage. Said Nick Buoniconti, "Teams would be totally confused." Linebacker Doug Swift was also a playmaker with three interceptions and a fumble recovery.

The Dolphins' undefeated, untied regular season was the third in NFL history, and the first of the post-merger era. The previous two teams to do so, the 1934 and 1942 Chicago Bears, both lost the NFL Championship game. Later, the 2007 New England Patriots became the 4th team to complete an undefeated and untied regular season, but lost to the New York Giants in Super Bowl XLII. The Cleveland Browns also completed a perfect season in 1948, including a league championship, while part of the All-America Football Conference (AAFC), but until April 1, 2025, this feat was recognized only by the Pro Football Hall of Fame, since the NFL did not officially recognize any AAFC records.

=== Washington Redskins ===
Following the death of Redskins head coach Vince Lombardi 17 days prior to the start of the 1970 season, Washington finished 6–8 under interim coach Bill Austin. Shortly after the conclusion of the 1970 season, the Redskins hired George Allen as their head coach, hoping he could turn the team's fortunes around. Allen's philosophy was that veteran players win games, so immediately after taking over the team, he traded away most of the younger team members and draft choices for older, more established players. His motto was "The future is now." Washington quickly became the oldest team in the NFL and earned the nickname "The Over-the-Hill Gang." The average age of starters was 31 years old. However, Allen's strategy turned the Redskins around, as the team improved to a 9–4–1 record in 1971, and finished the 1972 season with an NFC-best 11–3 record.

Washington was led by 33-year-old quarterback Billy Kilmer, who completed 120 out of 225 passes for 1,648 yards and a league-leading 19 touchdowns during the regular season, with only 11 interceptions, giving him an NFL-best 84.8 passer rating. Kilmer had started the first three games of the season, was replaced in Game 4 by 38-year-old Sonny Jurgensen, then replaced Jurgensen when he was lost for the season with an Achilles tendon injury. The Redskins' powerful rushing attack featured two backs. Larry Brown gained 1,216 yards (first in the NFC and second in the NFL, behind only O. J. Simpson's 1,251 rushing yards) on 285 carries during the regular season, caught 32 passes for 473 yards and scored 12 touchdowns, earning him both the NFL Most Valuable Player Award and the NFL Offensive Player of the Year Award. Charley Harraway ran for 567 yards on 148 carries. Future Hall of Fame wide receiver Charley Taylor and wide receiver Roy Jefferson provided the team with a solid deep threat, combining for 84 receptions, 1,223 receiving yards and 10 touchdowns. Veteran tight end Jerry Smith added 21 receptions for 353 yards and 7 touchdowns.

Washington also had a solid defense led by linebacker Chris Hanburger (four interceptions, 98 return yards, one touchdown) and cornerbacks Pat Fischer (four interceptions, 61 return yards) and Mike Bass (three interceptions, 53 return yards)

=== Playoffs ===
Morrall led the Dolphins to a 20–14 playoff win over the Cleveland Browns. However, Griese started the second half of the AFC Championship Game to help rally the Dolphins to a 21–17 victory over the Pittsburgh Steelers. A fake punt by Miami's Larry Seiple made the difference.

Meanwhile, the Redskins advanced to the Super Bowl without having allowed a touchdown in either their 16–3 playoff win over the Green Bay Packers or their crushing 26–3 NFC Championship Game victory over the Cowboys, the defending Super Bowl champions.

=== Super Bowl pregame news and notes ===
Much of the pregame hype surrounded the chances of the Dolphins completing a perfect, undefeated season, as well as their quarterback controversy between Griese and Morrall. Griese was eventually picked to start the Super Bowl because Shula felt more comfortable with Morrall as the backup just in case Griese was ineffective following his recent inactivity. Miami was also strongly motivated to win the Super Bowl after having been humiliated by the Dallas Cowboys in Super Bowl VI. Wrote Nick Buoniconti, "There was no way we were going to lose the Super Bowl; there was no way." Head coach Don Shula, loser of Super Bowls III and VI, was also determined to win. Although Shula was relaxed and charming when dealing with the press, it was all an act; Dolphins players described him as "neurotic" and "absolutely crazy." He was also sick during Super Bowl week with the flu, which he kept secret.

Still, many favored the Redskins to win the game because of their group of "Over the Hill Gang" veterans, and because Miami had what some considered an easy schedule (only two opponents, Kansas City and the New York Giants, posted winning records, and both of those teams were 8–6 and missed the playoffs). This is reflected in the regular season standings where Miami ended the regular season 7 games in front of the New York Jets in the AFC East while Washington barely won the NFC East winning the division over the Dallas Cowboys by one game. and had struggled in the playoffs. In the playoffs, Miami trailed in the second half of both contests needing a 4th quarter comeback against the Browns in the Divisional round and a quarterback change in the AFC Championship against the Steelers. Washington easily beat their playoff opponents holding both to a field goal.

Allen had a reputation for spying on opponents. A school overlooked the Rams facility that the NFL designated as the Dolphins practice field, so the Dolphins found a more secure field at a local community college. Dolphins employees inspected the trees every day for spies.

Miami cornerback Tim Foley, a future broadcaster who was injured and would not play in Super Bowl VII, was writing daily stories for a Miami newspaper and interviewed George Allen and his players, provoking charges from Allen that Foley was actually spying for Shula.

Allen was extremely uptight and prickly dealing with the press Super Bowl week, and accused the press of ruining his team's preparation. Allen pushed the team so hard in practices that the players joked among themselves that they should have left Allen in Washington.

During practice the day before Super Bowl VII, the Dolphins' 5'7" 150-pound kicker, Garo Yepremian, relaxed by throwing 30-yard passes to Dave Shula, Don Shula's son. During the pregame warmups, he consistently kicked low line drives and couldn't figure out why.

This was the first Super Bowl in which neither coach wore a tie. Shula wore a coat and tie for Super Bowl VI, but wore a white short-sleeved polo shirt for this game, as did Allen. For Super Bowl VIII, Shula would wear a sport coat, but with a shirt underneath that was similar to the one he wore in Super Bowl VII. This was the warmest Super Bowl on record with a kickoff temperature of 84 °F (29 °C).

The American flag in the east end of the Coliseum flew at half-mast in memory of former President Harry S. Truman, who died December 26, 1972. Richard Nixon declared the traditional 30-day mourning period following the death of a president later that day.

== Broadcasting ==
The game was broadcast in the United States by NBC with play-by-play announcer Curt Gowdy, color commentator Al DeRogatis and sideline reporter Bill Enis; who also covered the Trophy presentation, with other contributors including Kyle Rote. This was Enis' final Super Bowl telecast before his death on December 14, 1973, as well as Rote's last Super Bowl before leaving broadcasting and DeRogatis' first Super Bowl as lead color commentator (and only Super Bowl as the solo analyst).

This was the first Super Bowl to be televised live in the city in which it was being played, via NBC's flagship station in Los Angeles, KNBC (Channel 4). Despite unconditional blackout rules in the NFL that normally would have prohibited the live telecast from being shown locally, the NFL allowed the game to be telecast in the Los Angeles area on an experimental basis when all tickets for the game were sold. The league then changed its blackout rules the following season to allow any game sold out at least 72 hours in advance to be televised in the host market. No subsequent Super Bowl has ever been blacked out under this rule, as all have been sold out (owing to its status as the marquee event on the NFL schedule, meaning that tickets sell out quickly).

This game is featured on NFL's Greatest Games under the title "17–0".

== Entertainment ==
The pregame show was a tribute to Apollo 17, the sixth and last mission to land on the Moon and the final one of Project Apollo. The show featured the Michigan Marching Band and the crew of Apollo 17 who exactly one month earlier had been the final humans to date to leave the Moon. The Apollo 17 crew also recited the final Pledge of Allegiance in Super Bowl history.

Later, the Little Angels of Chicago's Angels Church from Chicago performed the national anthem.

== Halftime show ==
Super Bowl VII halftime show
- Part of: Super Bowl VII
- Date: January 14, 1973
- Location: Los Angeles, California
- Venue: Los Angeles Memorial Coliseum
- Theme: "Happiness Is"
- Headliner: Michigan Marching Band; Woody Herman; Andy Williams; Citrus College Singers
- Producer: Tommy Walker

Super Bowl halftime show chronology
VI (1972)	VII (1973)	VIII (1974)

The halftime show, featured Woody Herman and the Michigan Marching Band along with The Citrus College Singers and Andy Williams, was titled "Happiness Is". The show was produced by Tommy Walker.

=== Setlist ===
Partial setlist:

- "Put on a Happy Face" (University of Michigan Marching Band)
- "Woodchopper's Ball" (University of Michigan Marching Band with Woody Herman)
- "La Virgen de la Macarena" (University of Michigan Marching Band)
- "This Land Is Your Land" (University of Michigan Marching Band)
- "Marmalade, Molasses & Honey" (Andy Williams)
- "People" (Andy Williams)

== Game summary ==
According to Shula, the Dolphins' priority on defense was to stop Larry Brown and force Billy Kilmer to pass. Buoniconti looked at Washington's offensive formation on each play and shifted the defense so it was strongest where he felt Brown would run. This strategy proved successful. Washington's offensive line also had trouble handling Dolphins' defensive tackle/nose tackle Manny Fernandez, who was very quick. "He beat their center Len Hauss like a drum", wrote Buoniconti. Miami's defenders had also drilled in maintaining precise pursuit angles on sweeps to prevent the cut-back running that Duane Thomas had used to destroy the Dolphins in Super Bowl VI.

Washington's priority on defense was to disrupt Miami's ball-control offense by stopping Larry Csonka. They also intended to shut down Paul Warfield by double-covering him.

With a game-time kickoff temperature of 84 °F (29 °C), this is the warmest Super Bowl to date. It came the year after the coldest game in Super Bowl VI which registered a temperature at kickoff of 39 °F (4 °C).

=== First quarter ===
As they did in Super Bowl VI, Miami won the toss and elected to receive. Most of the first quarter was a defensive battle with each team punting on their first two possessions. The Dolphins would, however, get one key break with another apparent error being due to penalty. Offensive tackle Howard Kindig appeared to fumble the snap on their first punt from the Miami 27 and lose the ball to Washington linebacker Harold McLinton, but McLinton was called for slapping at the ball while it was being snapped, for a 5-yard penalty. On the replay of the down, Miami punter Larry Seiple got the kick away safely. Later, after stopping the Redskins for the second time, Dolphins safety Jake Scott did not call for a fair catch, as he had not been told to do so by safety Dick Anderson. Scott fumbled the ball while taking a hit by Redskins cornerback Ted Vactor, but Anderson made the recovery. Miami then started this drive on their own 37-yard line with 2:55 left in the first quarter. Running back Jim Kiick started out the drive with two carries for 11 yards. Then quarterback Bob Griese completed an 18-yard pass to wide receiver Paul Warfield to reach the Washington 34-yard line. After two more running plays, Griese threw a 28-yard touchdown pass (his longest completion of the game) to wide receiver Howard Twilley for his only catch of the game. Twilley fooled cornerback Pat Fischer by faking a route to the inside, then broke to the outside and caught the ball at the 5-yard line, dragging Fischer with him into the end zone. "Griese read us real good all day", said Fischer. Kicker Garo Yepremian's extra point gave the Dolphins a 7–0 lead with one second remaining in the period. (Yepremian noticed that the kick was too low, just like his practice kicks).

=== Second quarter ===
On the third play of the Redskins' ensuing drive, Scott intercepted Redskins quarterback Billy Kilmer's pass down the middle intended for wide receiver Charley Taylor and returned it 8 yards to the Washington 47-yard line. However, a 15-yard ineligible player downfield penalty on the Dolphins nullified Griese's 20-yard pass to tight end Marv Fleming on the first play after the turnover, and the Dolphins were forced to punt after a three-and-out.

After the Redskins were forced to punt again, Miami reached the 47-yard line with a 13-yard run by fullback Larry Csonka and an 8-yard run by Kiick. But on the next play, Griese's 47-yard touchdown pass to Warfield was nullified by an illegal formation penalty on Miami's offensive line. On third down, Redskins defensive tackle Diron Talbert sacked Griese for a 6-yard loss and the Dolphins had to punt.

The Redskins then advanced from their own 17-yard line to the Miami 48-yard line (their first incursion into Miami territory) with less than two minutes left in the half. But on 3rd-and-3, Dolphins linebacker Nick Buoniconti intercepted a pass by Kilmer at the Miami 41-yard line and returned it 31 yards to the Washington 28-yard line. From there, Kiick and Csonka each ran once for three yards, and then Griese completed a 19-yard pass (his sixth completion in six attempts) to tight end Jim Mandich, who made a diving catch at the 2-yard line. Two plays later, Kiick scored on a 1-yard touchdown run with a block by Csonka, guard Larry Little, and offensive tackle Norm Evans with just 18 seconds left in the half, giving the Dolphins a lead of 14–0 before halftime (once again, Yepremian noticed his extra point kick was too low).

Miami's defense dominated the Redskins in the first half, limiting Washington to 49 yards rushing, 23 yards passing, and four first downs.

=== Third quarter ===
The Redskins had more success moving the ball in the second half. They took the second half kickoff and advanced across midfield for only the second time in the game, driving from their own 29-yard line to Miami's 17-yard line in a seven-play drive that featured just two runs. On first down at Miami's 17-yard line, Kilmer threw to Taylor, who was open at the 2-yard line, but Taylor stumbled right before the ball arrived and the ball glanced off his fingertips. After a second-down screen pass to fullback Charley Harraway fell incomplete, Dolphins defensive tackle Manny Fernandez sacked Kilmer on third down for a loss of 8 yards, and Washington's drive ended with no points after kicker Curt Knight's ensuing 32-yard field goal attempt sailed wide right. "That was an obvious turning point", said Allen. Three possessions later, the Dolphins drove 78 yards to Washington's 5-yard line, featuring a 49-yard run by Csonka, the second-longest run in Super Bowl history at the time. However, Redskins safety Brig Owens intercepted a pass intended for Fleming in the end zone for a touchback.

=== Fourth quarter ===
Early in the fourth quarter, Washington threatened to score by mounting their most impressive drive of the game, driving 79 yards from their own 11 to Miami's 10-yard line in twelve plays. On second down at the Miami 10-yard line, Kilmer threw to Smith, who was wide open in the end zone, but the ball hit the crossbar of the goalpost and fell incomplete. Then on third down, Scott intercepted Kilmer's pass to Taylor in the end zone and returned it 55 yards to the Redskins 48-yard line.

Miami moved the ball to the Washington 34-yard line on their ensuing drive. Leading 14–0 on 4th-and-4, Shula could have tried for a conversion, but thought "What a hell of a way to remember this game" if they could end a perfect 17–0 season with a 17–0 Super Bowl final score. He called on Yepremian to attempt a 42-yard field goal in what is now remembered as one of the most famous blunders in NFL lore: "Garo's Gaffe". As had been the case all day, Yepremian's kick was too low, and it was blocked by defensive tackle Bill Brundige. The ball bounced to Yepremian's right and he reached it before holder Earl Morrall. But instead of falling on the ball, Yepremian picked it up and, with Brundige bearing down on him, made a frantic attempt to pass the ball to Csonka, who blocked on field goals. Unfortunately for Miami, the ball slipped out of his hands and went straight up in the air. Yepremian attempted to bat the ball out of bounds, but instead batted it back up into the air, and it went right into the arms of cornerback Mike Bass, who returned the fumble 49 yards for a touchdown, the first fumble recovery returned for a touchdown in Super Bowl history, to make the score 14–7 with 2:07 left in the game.

Washington did not try an onside kick following the touchdown, but instead kicked deep. The Redskins were forced to use up all of their timeouts on the Dolphins' ensuing five-play possession, but did force Miami to punt (nearly blocking the punt) from their own 36-yard line with 1:14 remaining in the game, giving themselves a chance to drive for the tying touchdown and force overtime for the first time in Super Bowl history. However, Miami's defense forced two incompletions and a 4-yard loss on a swing pass, and then defensive ends Vern Den Herder and Bill Stanfill sacked Kilmer for a 9-yard loss on fourth down, sealing the Dolphins' victory. Following the ball being spotted on the change of possession, the clock was started, as per the rule which existed at the time, and no more plays were run before time expired in the game. Beginning the following season with a new rule change, the clock would not start until the snap following all changes of possession.

Griese finished the game having completed 8 out of 11 passes for 88 yards and a touchdown, with one interception. Csonka was the game's leading rusher with 15 carries for 112 yards. Kiick had 38 rushing yards, two receptions for six yards, and a touchdown. Morris had 34 rushing yards. Manny Fernandez had 11 solo tackles and six assists. Kilmer completed six more passes than Griese but finished the game with just 16 more total passing yards and was intercepted three times. Said Kilmer, "I wasn't sharp at all. Good as their defense is, I still should have thrown better." Washington's Larry Brown rushed for 72 yards on 22 carries and also had five receptions for 26 yards. Redskins receiver Roy Jefferson was the top receiver of the game, with five catches for 50 yards. Washington amassed almost as many total yards (228) as Miami (253), and actually more first downs (16 to Miami's 12) and more time of possession (32:31 to 27:29). As of 2023, this game is the only Super Bowl where the team with the advantage in time of possession did not score any offensive points.

=== Delayed White House visit ===
The Dolphins never made the traditional post-game visit to the White House due to the Watergate scandal, but in August 2013 finally made the trip at the behest of Barack Obama, minus Manny Fernandez, Jim Langer, and Bob Kuechenberg, who did not attend due to their opposition to the Obama administration. Garo Yepremian was a longtime Republican supporter and friend of former Florida Governor Jeb Bush but made the trip anyway and had an amusing exchange with President Obama over his long-ago bumble in the game.

=== Box score ===
Super Bowl VII: Miami Dolphins 14, Washington Redskins 7

Quarter	1	2	3	4	Total
Dolphins (AFC)	7	7	0	0	14
Redskins (NFC)	0	0	0	7	7

at Los Angeles Memorial Coliseum, Los Angeles, California

- Date: January 14, 1973
- Game time: 12:49 p.m. PST
- Game weather: 84 °F (29 °C), sunny, hazy

Scoring summary

Quarter	Time	Drive			Team	Scoring information	Score	
Quarter	Time	Plays	Yards	TOP	Team	Scoring information	MIA	WAS
1	0:01	6	63	2:54	MIA	Howard Twilley 28-yard touchdown reception from Bob Griese, Garo Yepremian kick good	7	0
2	0:18	5	27	1:33	MIA	Jim Kiick 1-yard touchdown run, Yepremian kick good	14	0
4	2:07		—	—	WAS	Fumble recovery returned 49 yards for touchdown by Mike Bass, Curt Knight kick good	14	7
"TOP" = time of possession. For other American football terms, see Glossary of American football.							14	7

== Final statistics ==
Sources:The NFL's Official Encyclopedic History of Professional Football, (1973), p. 153, Macmillan Publishing Co. New York, LCCN 73-3862, NFL.com Super Bowl VII, Super Bowl VII Play Finder Mia, Super Bowl VII Play Finder Was

=== Statistical comparison ===
	Miami Dolphins	Washington Redskins
First downs	12	16
First downs rushing	7	9
First downs passing	5	7
First downs penalty	0	0
Third down efficiency	3/11	3/13
Fourth down efficiency	0/0	0/1
Net yards rushing	184	141
Rushing attempts	37	36
Yards per rush	5.0	3.9
Passing – Completions/attempts	8/11	14/28
Times sacked-total yards	2–19	2–17
Interceptions thrown	1	3
Net yards passing	69	87
Total net yards	253	228
Punt returns-total yards	2–4	4–9
Kickoff returns-total yards	2–33	3–45
Interceptions-total return yards	3–95	1–0
Punts-average yardage	7–43.0	5–31.2
Fumbles-lost	2–1	1–0
Penalties-total yards	3–35	3–25
Time of possession	27:29	32:31
Turnovers	2	3

=== Individual statistics ===
Dolphins passing
	C/ATT^{1}	Yds	TD	INT	Rating
Bob Griese	8/11	88	1	1	88.4
Dolphins rushing
	Car^{2}	Yds	TD	LG^{3}	Yds/Car
Larry Csonka	15	112	0	49	7.47
Jim Kiick	12	38	1	8	3.17
Mercury Morris	10	34	0	6	3.40
Dolphins receiving
	Rec^{4}	Yds	TD	LG^{3}	Target^{5}
Paul Warfield	3	36	0	18	4
Jim Kiick	2	6	0	4	2
Howard Twilley	1	28	1	28	2
Jim Mandich	1	19	0	19	1
Larry Csonka	1	–1	0	–1	1
Marv Fleming	0	0	0	0	1

Redskins passing
	C/ATT^{1}	Yds	TD	INT	Rating
Billy Kilmer	14/28	104	0	3	19.6
Redskins rushing
	Car^{2}	Yds	TD	LG^{3}	Yds/Car
Larry Brown	22	72	0	11	3.27
Charley Harraway	10	37	0	8	3.70
Billy Kilmer	2	18	0	9	9.00
Charley Taylor	1	8	0	8	8.00
Jerry Smith	1	6	0	6	6.00
Redskins receiving
	Rec^{4}	Yds	TD	LG^{3}	Target^{5}
Roy Jefferson	5	50	0	15	6
Larry Brown	5	26	0	12	8
Charley Taylor	2	20	0	15	9
Jerry Smith	1	11	0	11	2
Charley Harraway	1	–3	0	–3	2
Clifton McNeil	0	0	0	0	1

^{1}Completions/attempts ^{2}Carries ^{3}Long gain ^{4}Receptions ^{5}Times targeted

=== Records set ===
The following records were set or tied in Super Bowl VII, according to the official NFL.com boxscore and the ProFootball reference.com game summary. Some records have to meet NFL minimum number of attempts to be recognized. The minimums are shown (in parentheses).

Player records set in Super Bowl VII
Rushing records
Most yards, career	152	Larry Csonka (Miami)
Longest run from scrimmage	49 yards	Larry Csonka (Miami)
Highest average gain, career (20 attempts)	6.3 yards (152–24)	Larry Csonka (Miami)
Fumbles
Most fumble return yards, game	49 yards	Mike Bass (Washington)
Longest fumble return	49 yards	Mike Bass (Washington)
Longest fumble return for touchdown	49 yards	Mike Bass (Washington)
Most fumble returns for touchdowns, game	1	Mike Bass (Washington)
Defense
Most interception yards gained, game	63	Jake Scott (Miami)
Most interception yards gained, career	63	Jake Scott (Miami)
Special Teams
Most kickoff returns, career	6	Mercury Morris (Miami)
Most kickoff return yards, career	123	Mercury Morris (Miami)
Records tied
Most interceptions thrown, game	3	Billy Kilmer (Washington)
Most interceptions made, game	2	Jake Scott (Miami)
Most fumbles, game Most fumbles, career	1	Larry Brown (Washington)
Most fumbles, game Most fumbles, career	1	Garo Yepremian; Jake Scott (Miami)
Most fumbles recovered, game Most fumbles recovered, career	1	Mike Bass (Washington)
Most fumbles recovered, game Most fumbles recovered, career	1	Dick Anderson (Miami)

Team records
Passing
Fewest passing attempts	11	Dolphins
Fewest passes completed	8	Dolphins
Fewest yards passing (net)	69	Dolphins
Lowest average yards gained per pass attempt	3.1	Redskins (87–28)
Defense
Most yards gained by interception return	95	Dolphins
Punting
Lowest average, game (4 punts)	31.2 yards (5–156)	Redskins
Records tied
Most Super Bowl appearances	2	Dolphins
Most consecutive Super Bowl appearances	2	Dolphins
Most points, first quarter	7	Dolphins
Largest lead, end of first quarter	7 points	Dolphins
Fewest points, second half	0	Dolphins
Fewest first downs passing	5	Dolphins
Most Super Bowl losses	1	Redskins
Fewest points, first half	0	Redskins
Fewest rushing touchdowns	0	Redskins
Fewest passing touchdowns	0	Redskins
Fewest first downs penalty	0	Dolphins; Redskins

Records set, both team totals
	Total	Dolphins	Redskins
Points, Both Teams thru
Fewest points	21	14	7
Fewest points scored, second half	7	0	7
Field Goals, Both Teams
Fewest field goals made	0	0	0
Net yards, Both Teams
Fewest net yards, rushing and passing	481	253	228
Rushing, Both Teams
Most rushing attempts	73	37	36
Passing, Both Teams
Fewest passing attempts	39	11	28
Fewest passes completed	22	8	14
Fewest yards passing (net)	156	69	87
Defense, Both Teams
Most yards gained by interception return	95	95	0
Kickoff returns, Both Teams
Fewest yards gained	78	33	45
Punt returns, Both Teams
Fewest yards gained	13	4	9
Records tied, both team totals
Most points, first quarter	7	7	0
Fewest field goals attempted	2	1	1
Fewest rushing touchdowns	1	1	0
Fewest first downs, penalty	0	0	0
Fewest kickoff returns	5	2	3

== Starting lineups ==
Hall of Fame‡

Miami	Position	Washington
Offense
Paul Warfield‡	WR	Charley Taylor‡
Wayne Moore	LT	Terry Hermeling
Bob Kuechenberg	LG	Paul Laaveg
Jim Langer‡	C	Len Hauss
Larry Little‡	RG	John Wilbur
Norm Evans	RT	Walt Rock
Marv Fleming	TE	Jerry Smith
Howard Twilley	WR	Roy Jefferson
Bob Griese‡	QB	Billy Kilmer
Larry Csonka‡	FB	Charley Harraway
Jim Kiick	RB	Larry Brown
Defense
Vern Den Herder	LE	Ron McDole
Manny Fernandez	LT	Bill Brundige
Bob Heinz	RT	Diron Talbert
Bill Stanfill	RE	Verlon Biggs
Doug Swift	LLB	Jack Pardee
Nick Buoniconti‡	MLB	Myron Pottios
Mike Kolen	RLB	Chris Hanburger‡
Lloyd Mumphord	LCB	Pat Fischer
Curtis Johnson	RCB	Mike Bass
Dick Anderson	LS	Brig Owens
Jake Scott	RS	Roosevelt Taylor

== Officials ==
- Referee: Tom Bell #7 second Super Bowl (III)
- Umpire: Lou Palazzi #51 second Super Bowl (IV)
- Head linesman: Tony Veteri Sr. #36 second Super Bowl (II)
- Line judge: Bruce Alford #24 second Super Bowl (II)
- Back judge: Tom Kelleher #25 second Super Bowl (IV)
- Field judge: Tony Skover #50 first (and only) Super Bowl
- Alternate referee: Fred Silva #81, first Super Bowl, also alternate for Super Bowl IX; later worked Super Bowl XIV on field
- Alternate umpire: Walt Parker #41 second Super Bowl (III), first as an alternate

Note: A seven-official system was not used until 1978. Back judge and field judge swapped titles prior to the 1998 NFL season.

== Super Bowl postgame news ==
As Shula was being carried off the field after the end of the game, a kid who shook his hand stripped off his watch. Shula got down, chased after the kid, and retrieved his watch.

Manny Fernandez was a strong contender for MVP. Wrote Nick Buoniconti, "It was the game of his life–in fact, it was the most dominant game by a defensive lineman in the history of the game, and he would never be given much credit for it. They should have given out two game balls and made Manny Fernandez the co-MVP with Jake Scott." Larry Csonka also said he thought Fernandez should have been the MVP. The MVP was selected by Dick Schaap, the editor of SPORT magazine. Schaap admitted later that he had been out late the previous night, struggled to watch the defense-dominated game, and was not aware that Fernandez had 17 tackles.

When Garo Yepremian went back to the Dolphins' sideline after his botched field goal attempt, Nick Buoniconti told him that if they lost he would "Hang you up by one of your ties." Yepremian would joke to reporters after the game, "This is the first time the goat of the game is in the winner's locker room." But Yepremian would be so traumatized by his botched attempt that he had to be helped from the post-game party by his brother because of a stress-induced stabbing pain down his right side. Depressed, he spent two weeks in seclusion until he was cheered up by a letter, apparently from Shula, praising him for his contributions to the team and urging him to ignore criticism. Yepremian kept the letter and mentioned it to Shula in 2000, but Shula had no knowledge of it. They concluded the letter was actually written by Shula's wife Dorothy, who died from breast cancer in 1991. She had signed her husband's name to it. Nevertheless, "Garo's Gaffe" made Yepremian famous and led to a lucrative windfall of speaking engagements and endorsements. "It's been a blessing", said Yepremian, who died in 2015.

The same teams met 10 years later in Super Bowl XVII, which was also played in the Los Angeles area, at the Rose Bowl in Pasadena. The Redskins won that game, 27–17. Two starters from Miami's undefeated team, guard Bob Kuechenberg and defensive end Vern Den Herder, were still active during the strike-shortened 1982 season. The Redskins had no players remaining from Super Bowl VII on their Super Bowl XVII roster. The last member of the 1972 Redskins still active with the franchise, offensive tackle Terry Hermeling, retired after the 1980 season.

Redskins linebacker and defensive captain Jack Pardee retired immediately following this game, ending a 16-year career. He coached the Chicago Bears for three seasons (1975–77) before succeeding Allen as Redskins coach in 1978. Pardee was fired following a 6–10 campaign in 1980 and was replaced by Joe Gibbs, who led the Redskins to three Super Bowl championships (XVII, XXII, XXVI) and 171 victories to earn induction into the Pro Football Hall of Fame. After coaching the Houston Gamblers of the United States Football League in 1984 and '85, Pardee coached at the University of Houston (1987–89) and the Houston Oilers (1990–94).

The Miami Dolphins became the second team to win the Super Bowl after losing it the previous year. They were the last team to do so until the New England Patriots in Super Bowl LIII.

== Bibliography ==
- Super Bowl official website
- 2006 NFL Record and Fact Book. Time Inc. Home Entertainment. July 25, 2006. ISBN 1-933405-32-5.
- Total Football II: The Official Encyclopedia of the National Football League. HarperCollins. July 25, 2006. ISBN 1-933405-32-5.
- The Official NFL Encyclopedia Pro Football. NAL Books. 1982. ISBN 0-453-00431-8.
- Sporting News (February 1995). The Sporting News Complete Super Bowl Book 1995. Sporting News Publishing Company. ISBN 0-89204-523-X.
