= Dale McCullers =

American football player (born 1947)

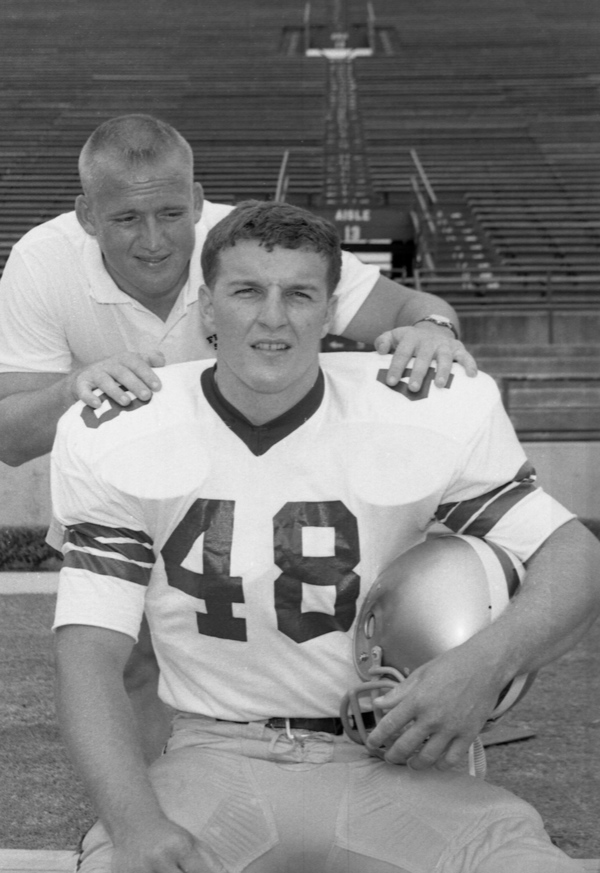
- McCullers in 1967

No. 54
- Position: Linebacker

Personal information
- Born: October 11, 1947 (age 79); Lake City, Florida, U.S.
- Listed height: 6 ft 1 in (1.85 m)
- Listed weight: 215 lb (98 kg)

Career information
- High school: Suwannee (Live Oak, Florida)
- College: Florida State (1965-1968)
- NFL draft: 1969: 12th round, 297th overall pick

Career history
- Miami Dolphins (1969)

Awards and highlights
- Super Bowl champion (V); First-team All-American (1968)

Career AFL statistics
- Fumble recoveries: 2
- Sacks: 1
- Stats at Pro Football Reference

Dale McCullers (born October 11, 1947) is an American former professional football player who was a linebacker for the Miami Dolphins of the National Football League (NFL) in 1969. He played college football for the Florida State Seminoles, where he earned first-team All-American honors in 1968.
