= Jim Mertens =

American football player (born 1947)

No. 87
- Position: Tight end

Personal information
- Born: May 25, 1947 (age 79); Cumberland, Maryland, U.S.
- Listed height: 6 ft 3 in (1.91 m)
- Listed weight: 240 lb (109 kg)

Career information
- High school: Fort Hill (Cumberland)
- College: Fairmont State (1965-1968)
- NFL draft: 1969: 10th round, 245th overall pick

Career history
- Miami Dolphins (1969)

Career AFL statistics
- Receptions: 2
- Receiving yards: 26
- Stats at Pro Football Reference

James Frederick Mertens' is an American former professional football player who was a tight end for one season with the Miami Dolphins of the American Football League (AFL) in 1969. He played college football for the Fairmont State Fighting Falcons. Mertens was selected by the Dolphins in the 1969 NFL/AFL draft, and was also chosen by the Cincinnati Reds in the 1969 Major League Baseball draft. After his football career, he became a high school teacher in the Hollywood, Florida area.

== Early life ==
Mertens was born in Cumberland, Maryland, in 1947.

== Football ==
Before being selected 245th overall in the tenthround by the Miami Dolphins in 1969, Mertens attended college in West Virginia, where he was Fairmont State University's 1968 Football Team lead scorer, with 29 receptions for 509 yards and 54 points. He was a letterman for four years and a leading pass receiver on the School's NAIA Bowl Team.

== Baseball ==
Mertens was a leading hitter on Fairmont State's College Baseball Team.
