= Jim Riley (American football) =

American football player (born 1945)

No. 70
- Position: Defensive end

Personal information
- Born: July 6, 1945 (age 81); Galveston, Texas, U.S.
- Listed height: 6 ft 4 in (1.93 m)
- Listed weight: 250 lb (113 kg)

Career information
- High school: Enid (Enid, Oklahoma)
- College: Oklahoma (1963-1966)
- NFL draft: 1967: 2nd round, 29th overall pick

Career history
- Miami Dolphins (1967-1971)

Career NFL/AFL statistics
- Fumble recoveries: 4
- Sacks: 15
- Stats at Pro Football Reference

James Glen Riley (born July 6, 1945) is an American former professional football player who was a defensive end for the Miami Dolphins in the American Football League (AFL) and the National Football League (NFL). Riley played college football for the Oklahoma Sooners. He started in Super Bowl VI.

== See also ==
- List of American Football League players
