= Gene Milton =

American football player (born 1944)

No. 28
- Position: Wide receiver

Personal information
- Born: September 28, 1944 (age 82); Ocala, Florida, U.S.
- Listed height: 5 ft 10 in (1.78 m)
- Listed weight: 185 lb (84 kg)

Career information
- High school: Howard (Ocala)
- College: Florida A&M (1964-1967)
- NFL draft: 1968: undrafted

Career history
- Miami Dolphins (1968-1969)

Career AFL statistics
- Receptions: 21
- Receiving yards: 322
- Receiving touchdowns: 1
- Stats at Pro Football Reference

Eugene (Gene) Milton (born September 28, 1944) is an American former professional football player who was a wide receiver and kick returner for the Miami Dolphins of the American Football League (AFL). He played college football for the Florida A&M Rattlers.

Milton was born on September 28, 1944, in Ocala, Florida, and attended segregated Howard High School, where he set numerous Florida Interscholastic Athletic Association (the association for negro schools) records, including a 9.4 time in the 100 yard dash. Although this record tied the national high school record set by Jesse Owens, James Jackson, and Trenton Jackson, it was not widely reported He attended Florida A&M University where he excelled both in football and track.

After graduating from FAMU, he played professional football for the Miami Dolphins. He later coached football at Florida Memorial University, Miami Central High School, Miami Carol City High School, and Miami Park High School.

He was added to the Florida A&M Sports Hall of Fame in 1990 and the Florida Track and Field Hall of Fame in 2016. He played for the Dolphins from 1968 to 1969.
