= Jim Cox (tight end) =

American football player (born 1946)

No. 83
- Position: Tight end

Personal information
- Born: December 21, 1946 (age 79); Baltimore, Maryland, U.S.
- Listed height: 6 ft 3 in (1.91 m)
- Listed weight: 230 lb (104 kg)

Career information
- High school: Christopher Columbus (Miami, Florida)
- College: Miami (FL)
- NFL draft: 1968: 2nd round, 54th overall pick

Career history
- Miami Dolphins (1968)

Career AFL statistics
- Receptions: 11
- Receiving yards: 147
- Return yards: 41
- Stats at Pro Football Reference

James Allen Cox (born December 21, 1946) is an American former professional football player who was a tight end for the Miami Dolphins of the American Football League (AFL) for 13 games in 1968. Cox attended Christopher Columbus High School in Miami, Florida, and played college football for the Miami Hurricanes. Cox has since been inducted to both schools respective hall of fames.

Jim is married to Grace Cox, together they have two daughters and six grandchildren.
