= Randy Edmunds (American football) =

American football player (born 1946)

No. 55, 51, 52
- Position: Linebacker

Personal information
- Born: June 24, 1946 (age 80); Washington, Georgia, U.S.
- Listed height: 6 ft 2 in (1.88 m)
- Listed weight: 220 lb (100 kg)

Career information
- High school: Lincoln County (Lincolnton, Georgia)
- College: Georgia Tech (1964-1967)
- NFL draft: 1968: 8th round, 217th overall pick

Career history
- Miami Dolphins (1968-1969); New England Patriots (1971); Baltimore Colts (1972)

Career NFL/AFL statistics
- Fumble recoveries: 3
- Interceptions: 1
- Sacks: 6
- Stats at Pro Football Reference

George Randall Edmunds (born June 24, 1946) is an American former professional football player who was a linebacker in the American Football League (AFL) and National Football League (NFL). He played college football for the Georgia Tech Yellow Jackets. He was selected by the AFL's Miami Dolphins in the eighth round of the 1968 NFL/AFL draft with the 217th overall pick. He played for the Dolphins and the NFL's New England Patriots and Baltimore Colts.
