= Bob Joswick =

American football player (born 1946)

No. 80
- Position: Defensive end

Personal information
- Born: January 12, 1946 (age 80); Uniontown, Pennsylvania, U.S.
- Listed height: 6 ft 5 in (1.96 m)
- Listed weight: 250 lb (113 kg)

Career information
- High school: South Union (Uniontown)
- College: Tulsa (1966-1967)
- NFL draft: 1968: 13th round, 334th overall pick

Career history
- Miami Dolphins (1968-1969)

Career AFL statistics
- Games played: 6
- Stats at Pro Football Reference

Robert Leonard Joswick (born January 12, 1946) is an American former professional football player who was a defensive end for two seasons with the Miami Dolphins of the National Football League (NFL) in 1968 and in 1969. He played college football for the Tulsa Golden Hurricane and was selected in the 13th round (334th overall) of the 1968 NFL/AFL draft.
