= John Boynton (American football) =

American football player (born 1946)

No. 71
- Position: Offensive tackle

Personal information
- Born: March 28, 1946 (age 80); Pikeville, Tennessee, U.S.
- Listed height: 6 ft 4 in (1.93 m)
- Listed weight: 255 lb (116 kg)

Career information
- High school: Bledsoe County (Pikeville)
- College: Tennessee (1964–1967)
- NFL draft: 1968: 7th round, 172nd overall pick

Career history
- Miami Dolphins (1968–1969)

Awards and highlights
- Second-team All-American (1967); First-team All-SEC (1967)

Career AFL statistics
- Games played: 14
- Games started: 2
- Stats at Pro Football Reference

John Alden Boynton (born March 28, 1946) is an American former professional football player who was an offensive tackle for one season with the Miami Dolphins of the American Football League (AFL). He played college football for the Tennessee Volunteers and was selected by the Dolphins in the seventh round of the 1968 NFL/AFL draft.

== Early life and college ==
John Alden Boynton was born on March 28, 1946, in Pikeville, Tennessee. He attended Bledsoe County High School in Pikeville.

Boynton was a member of the Tennessee Volunteers of the University of Tennessee from 1964 to 1967 and a three-year letterman from 1965 to 1967. He was named a second-team All-American by both the Central Press Association and Newspaper Enterprise Association his senior year in 1967. He earned Associated Press and United Press International first-team All-SEC honors in 1967 as well.

== Professional career ==
Boynton was selected by the Miami Dolphins in the seventh round, with the 172nd overall pick, of the 1968 NFL/AFL draft. He did not play in any games in 1968 and spent time on the taxi squad. He played in all 14 games, starting two, for the Dolphins during the 1969 season. Boynton was released in 1970.

== Personal life ==
Boynton spent time as a high school football coach after his playing career. He also worked in the sporting goods business and as a farmer.

In 2024, Boynton's alma mater, Bledsoe County High School, named their football stadium John A. Boynton Stadium.
