= Jim Urbanek =

American football player (1945–2009)

No. 79
- Position: Defensive tackle

Personal information
- Born: April 8, 1945; Oxford, Mississippi, U.S.
- Died: August 24, 2009 (aged 64); Oxford, Mississippi, U.S.
- Listed height: 6 ft 4 in (1.93 m)
- Listed weight: 270 lb (122 kg)

Career information
- High school: Oxford
- College: Mississippi (1964-1967)
- NFL draft: 1968: 3rd round, 62nd overall pick

Career history
- Miami Dolphins (1968)

Awards and highlights
- 2× Second-team All-American (1966, 1967); 3× First-team All-SEC (1965, 1966, 1967)

Career AFL statistics
- Games played: 8
- Stats at Pro Football Reference

James Eugene Urbanek (April 8, 1945 – August 24, 2009) was an American professional football defensive tackle. He played college football at the University of Mississippi, where he received first-team All-American status in 1966 and 1967.

Urbanek was selected in the third round of the 1968 draft of the American Football League (AFL) by the Miami Dolphins and played in 1968.

Urbanek was inducted into the University of Mississippi Athletics Hall of Fame in 2002.

== See also ==
- List of American Football League players
