= Jimmy Keyes =

American football player (born 1944)

No. 52
- Positions: Placekicker, linebacker

Personal information
- Born: June 16, 1944 (age 82); Laurel, Mississippi, U.S.
- Listed height: 6 ft 2 in (1.88 m)
- Listed weight: 225 lb (102 kg)

Career information
- High school: Laurel
- College: Ole Miss (1964–1967)
- AFL draft: 1968: 2nd round, 35th overall pick

Career history
- Miami Dolphins (1968–1969)

Awards and highlights
- 2× First-team All-SEC (1966, 1967)

Career AFL statistics
- Field goals: 7/16
- Field goal %: 43.8
- Longest field goal: 31
- Stats at Pro Football Reference

James Elton Keyes (born June 16, 1944) is an American former professional football player who was a placekicker and linebacker for two seasons with the Miami Dolphins of the American Football League (AFL). He played college football for the Ole Miss Rebels and was selected by the Dolphins in the second round of the 1968 NFL/AFL draft.

== Early life and college ==
James Elton Keyes was born on June 16, 1944, in Laurel, Mississippi. He attended Laurel High School in Laurel.

Keyes was a member of the Ole Miss Rebels of the University of Mississippi from 1964 to 1967 and a three-year letterman from 1965 to 1967. He earned Associated Press (AP) first-team All-SEC honors at middle guard in 1966. In 1967, Keyes garnered AP and United Press International first-team All-SEC recognition at linebacker. He was also a placekicker from 1965 to 1967. During his first college game in 1965, he totaled 12 solo tackles, an interception return touchdown, and three field goals, earning Sports Illustrated Lineman of the Week honors. He was inducted into University of Mississippi's Athletic Hall of Fame in 1998.

== Professional career ==
Keyes was selected by the Miami Dolphins in the second round, with the 35th overall pick, of the 1968 NFL/AFL draft. He played in 12 games for the Dolphins in 1968, converting seven of 16 field goals and 30 of 30 extra points. He appeared in five games in 1950. Keyes was released in 1970.

== Personal life ==
Keyes later worked as a store manager for McRae's Department Store in Florida.
