= Nick Buoniconti =

American football player (1940–2019)

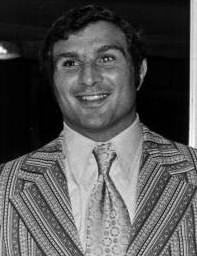
- Buoniconti, circa 1975

No. 85
- Position: Linebacker

Personal information
- Born: December 15, 1940; Springfield, Massachusetts, U.S.
- Died: July 30, 2019 (aged 78); Bridgehampton, New York, U.S.
- Listed height: 5 ft 11 in (1.80 m)
- Listed weight: 220 lb (100 kg)

Career information
- High school: Cathedral (Springfield)
- College: Notre Dame
- AFL draft: 1962: 13th round, 102nd overall pick

Career history
- Boston Patriots (1962–1968); Miami Dolphins (1969–1974, 1976)

Awards and highlights
- 2× Super Bowl champion (VII, VIII); 2× Second-team All-Pro (1972, 1973); 2× Pro Bowl (1972, 1973); 5× First-team All-AFL (1964–1967, 1969); 3× Second-team All-AFL (1962, 1963, 1968); 6× AFL All-Star (1963–1967, 1969); AFL All-Time Team; Boston Patriots All-1960s Team; New England Patriots 35th Anniversary Team; New England Patriots 50th Anniversary Team; New England Patriots Hall of Fame; Miami Dolphins Honor Roll; Dolphins Walk of Fame (2011); Second-team All-American (1961)

Career statistics
- Games: 183
- Interceptions: 32
- Stats at Pro Football Reference
- Pro Football Hall of Fame

Nicholas Anthony Buoniconti (/ˌboʊnəˈkɒnti/, December 15, 1940 – July 30, 2019) was an American professional football player who was a middle linebacker in the American Football League (AFL) and National Football League (NFL). He played college football for the Notre Dame Fighting Irish. Buoniconti played professionally for the Boston Patriots and Miami Dolphins, winning two Super Bowls with the Dolphins. He was inducted into the Pro Football Hall of Fame in 2001.

== Early life and family ==
Nicholas Buoniconti was born to Nicholas Anthony Buoniconti Sr. and Pasqualina "Patsy" Mercolino in Springfield, Massachusetts. The couple ran a family bakery in the predominantly Italian South End of the city called Mercolino's Italian Bakery (closed in its 99th year around September 2017). The 3rd generation family bakery was located at 1011 East Columbus Ave., Springfield, MA, 01105. Buoniconti was raised Roman Catholic and played football for Cathedral High School, where a plaque honoring him as a "Hometown Hall of Famer" was unveiled in 2012.

Buoniconti graduated from Notre Dame and was drafted by the American Football League's Patriots in the 13th round of the 1962 AFL draft.

In 1985, his son Marc suffered a spinal cord injury making a tackle for The Citadel, rendering him a quadriplegic. Nick Buoniconti became the public face of the group that founded the Miami Project to Cure Paralysis, now one of the world's leading neurological research centers.

Buoniconti was married twice. He had three children by his first marriage.

== College career ==
In 1960 as a junior, Buoniconti was second on the Fighting Irish in tackles with 71. As a senior in 1961, he led the team with 74 tackles as the Irish co-captain and was rewarded with 2nd-team All-America selections from UPI, TSN, and the Football Coaches' Association. Buoniconti was the only All-American on Notre Dame's 1961 team.

== Professional career ==
As a tackle, Buoniconti was the captain of the 1961 Notre Dame football team, but NFL scouts considered him too small to play professional football. Drafted in the 13th round by the Boston Patriots in the 1962 American Football League college draft and switched to linebacker, Buoniconti made an immediate impact, and he was named the team's rookie of the year. The following year, Buoniconti helped Boston capture the 1963 AFL Eastern Division title. With Boston, Buoniconti appeared in five AFL All-Star Games and recorded 24 interceptions. Buoniconti was named 2nd team All-AFL in 1963 and the following season began a run of five consensus All-AFL seasons in the following six seasons, missing only 1968 when Buoniconti was named second-team All-AFL. Buoniconti is a member of the Patriots All-1960s (AFL) Team and the AFL All-Time Team.

The Boston Patriots traded Buoniconti to the AFL's Miami Dolphins in 1969. The Dolphins sent the Patriots the highlight films of their 3rd string quarterback, Kim Hammond in a trade discussion. The Patriots did not work out Hammond and relied solely on the films provided by the Dolphins. Hammond was traded for Buoniconti. Initially Buoniconti refused to report to Miami and threatened retirement but was ultimately persuaded by the Dolphins to join the football team.

Buoniconti was entering his prime at 28 years old. He played for the Miami Dolphins in 1969–1974 and 1976 and made the AFL All-Star team in 1969 and the NFL Pro Bowl in 1972 and 1973, when Buoniconti led the Dolphins to Super Bowl wins. Buoniconti was also named All-AFC in 1972.

Buoniconti's leadership made him a cornerstone of the Dolphins' defense. During his years there, the team advanced to three consecutive Super Bowl appearances under Don Shula, the second of which was the team's 1972 undefeated season. In 1973, Buoniconti recorded a then-team record 162 tackles (91 unassisted). He was named to the AFC-NFC Pro Bowl in 1972 and 1973.

Buoniconti ended his career with an unofficial 24 sacks, 18 with the Patriots and six while with the Dolphins. His 32 career interceptions rank him third all-time among NFL linebackers. His interception of Billy Kilmer late in the second quarter of Super Bowl VII set up Miami's second touchdown, which proved to be the clincher in the Dolphins' 14–7 victory over the Washington Redskins to complete the 17–0 season.

Buoniconti was named the Dolphins' Most Valuable Player three times (1969, 1970, 1973). In 1990, he was voted as a linebacker on the Dolphins' Silver Anniversary All-Time team. On November 18, 1991, Buoniconti was enshrined on the Miami Dolphin's Honor Roll at Hard Rock Stadium.

== Post-playing career ==
Buoniconti earned a J.D. degree from Suffolk University Law School during his years with the Patriots. He was a practicing attorney for a short time. As an agent, he represented some 30 professional athletes, including baseball players Bucky Dent and Andre Dawson.

He was also president of the United States Tobacco Company during the late 1970s and early 1980s. Buoniconti was a leading critic of studies which showed that smokeless tobacco caused cancer of the mouth as well as other types of cancer.

In a televised interview on the Comedy Channel toward the end of 1990, when asked his reaction to the last two undefeated teams of the season suffering losses the same Sunday, Buoniconti, indicating his cheerful countenance, told Night After Night's Allan Havey, "You know, I think this smile might just stay permanently on my face."

Buoniconti also appeared in one of the Miller Lite "Do you know me?" TV ads, in which he talked about the No-Name Defense. The punch line was a variation on an old joke, with Buoniconti remarking that everyone knows him now. A passerby remarks, "Hey, I know you... you're... uh... uh..." trying to recall Buoniconti's name. Upon being told that it's Nick Buoniconti, the passerby says, "No, that's not it."

Buoniconti was a co-host of the HBO series Inside the NFL from 1978 until 2001. In 2001, he was inducted into the Pro Football Hall of Fame, where he joined his Inside the NFL co-host Len Dawson, who was inducted in 1987.

Buoniconti is a member of the National Italian American Sports Hall of Fame.

Buoniconti openly shared that he struggled with neurological issues, with one or several different diagnoses potentially being the cause. On November 3, 2017, he announced that he would posthumously donate his brain to aid CTE research. In March 2018, he joined with former NFL stars Harry Carson and Phil Villapiano to support a parent initiative called Flag Football Under 14, which advises no tackle football under that age.

== Death ==
Buoniconti died of pneumonia on July 30, 2019, in Bridgehampton, New York, at the age of 78. He was one of at least 345 NFL players to be diagnosed after death with CTE, which is caused by repeated hits to the head.

== See also ==
- List of American Football League players
- List of Pro Football Hall of Fame inductees
- List of AFL/NFL players with chronic traumatic encephalopathy
