= Walter Camp (disambiguation) =

Walter Camp (1859–1925) was an American football coach dubbed the "Father of American Football".

Walter Camp is also the name of:

- Walter Mason Camp (1867–1925), American railroad expert and writer
- Walter de Camp (died 2017), pseudonym of a Finnish writer

Walter Camp may also refer to named after the football coach:

- Walter Camp Alumni of the Year Award
- Walter Camp Award
- Walter Camp Coach of the Year Award
- Walter Camp Distinguished American Award
- Walter Camp Football Foundation
- Walter Camp Man of the Year Award
