= American Football Coaches Association =

Organization of football coaches at various levels

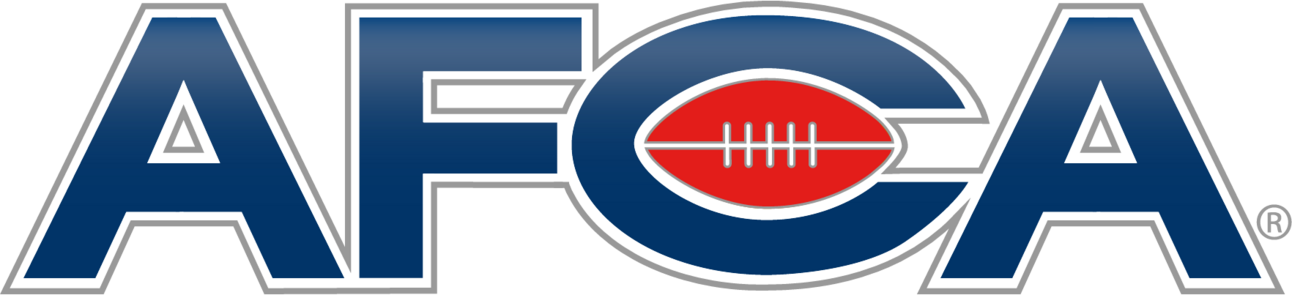
- Formation: 1921
- Headquarters: Waco, Texas
- Members: 11,000
- Executive Director: Craig Bohl
- President: Clark Lea
- Website: afca.com

The American Football Coaches Association (AFCA) is an association of over 11,000 American football coaches and staff on all levels. According to its constitution, some of the main goals of the American Football Coaches Association are to "maintain the highest possible standards in football and the profession of coaching football," and to "provide a forum for the discussion and study of all matters pertaining to football and coaching." The AFCA, along with USA Today, is responsible for the NCAA Division I Football Bowl Subdivision (FBS) Coaches Poll. The AFCA is also responsible for the Top 25 poll for Division II and Division III football.

The AFCA was founded in a meeting for 43 coaches at the Hotel Astor in New York City on Dec. 27, 1921. It is headquartered in Waco, Texas (the headquarters building is located across from Baylor University, formerly coached by AFCA executive director Grant Teaff).

The association has over 11,000 members and represents coaches at all levels including the National Collegiate Athletic Association, the National Association of Collegiate Directors of Athletics, the National Association of Intercollegiate Athletics, the National Junior College Athletic Association, the National Federation of State High School Associations, the National Football League, the Canadian Football League, USA Football, the National Football Foundation, College Football Hall of Fame, and Pop Warner Football. The AFCA is considered the primary professional association for football coaches at all levels of competition.

Another primary goal of the American Football Coaches Association is the promotion of safety. The association has established a code of ethics and has made many safety recommendations. An annual injury survey begun by the AFCA in the 1930s has provided valuable data and has led to a remarkable reduction of injuries in the sport down through the years. The NCAA Rules Committee often follows recommendations made by the AFCA.

== All-American Teams ==
Since 1945, the American Football Coaches Association has selected an All-American team. It is the only one selected exclusively by the coaches themselves.

== AFCA National Championship Trophy ==
The AFCA National Championship Trophy is the trophy awarded by the American Football Coaches Association (AFCA) to the winner of college football's Coaches Poll. From 1992 to 2013 the trophy was contractually obligated to be awarded to the winner of the Bowl Coalition (1992-1994), Bowl Alliance (1995-1997), and Bowl Championship Series (1998-2013) national championship game winner. The trophy has been awarded since 1986 but teams that won the Coaches Poll from earlier seasons can purchase replicas for those years.

== Amos Alonzo Stagg Award ==
Since 1940, the AFCA has awarded the annual Amos Alonzo Stagg Award to the "individual, group or institution whose services have been outstanding in the advancement of the best interests of football."

== Tuss McLaughry Award ==
The Tuss McLaughry Award, established in 1964, is given to a distinguished American (or Americans) for the highest distinction in service to others. It is named in honor of DeOrmond "Tuss" McLaughry, the first full-time secretary-treasurer of the AFCA and one of the most dedicated and influential members in the history of the association.

Tuss McLaughry, the award's namesake, began his coaching career at his alma mater, Westminster College in 1916. During his early days in coaching, McLaughry spent his spare time playing pro football with the Massillon Tigers. He went on to become head coach at Amherst (1922–25), Brown (1926–40), and Dartmouth (1941–55). McLaughry retired from coaching in 1954, but continued in his capacity as chairman of the Physical Education Department at Dartmouth until 1960, when he accepted the appointment with the AFCA. He retired from that position in 1965.

=== Winners ===
- 1964 Gen. Douglas MacArthur, armed forces
- 1965 Bob Hope, entertainer
- 1966 Lyndon B. Johnson, U.S. president
- 1967 Dwight D. Eisenhower, U.S. president
- 1968 J. Edgar Hoover, FBI director
- 1969 The Reverend Billy Graham, evangelist
- 1970 Richard M. Nixon, U.S. president
- 1971 Edwin Aldrin, Neil Armstrong, Michael Collins, Apollo 11 astronauts
- 1974 John Wayne, actor
- 1975 Gerald R. Ford, U.S. president
- 1977 Gen. James A. Van Fleet, armed forces
- 1979 James Stewart, actor
- 1980 Lt. Gen. Jimmy Doolittle, armed forces
- 1981 Dr. Jerome Holland, educator, business executive
- 1982 Robert L. Crippen & John W. Young, astronauts
- 1983 Ronald Reagan, U.S. president
- 1985 Pete Rozelle, NFL commissioner
- 1986 Gen. Pete Dawkins, armed forces
- 1987 Gen. Chuck Yeager, armed forces
- 1988 Lindsey Nelson, sportscaster
- 1989 George Shultz, U.S. secretary of state
- 1990 Burt Reynolds, actor
- 1993 Tom Landry, Dallas Cowboys head coach
- 1994 Charley Boswell, war hero
- 1996 Eddie Robinson, Grambling State University head coach
- 1998 George Bush, U.S. president
- 2001 Andrew Young, United States ambassador of the U.N.
- 2002 Roger Staubach, Businessman, Pro and College Football Hall of Famer
- 2003 Dr. Stephen Ambrose, Author and historian
- 2004 Gen. Tommy Franks, armed forces
- 2005 Dr. Christopher Kraft, NASA engineer
- 2007 Paul Tagliabue, NFL commissioner
- 2008 Tom Osborne, Nebraska Cornhuskers head coach, congressman
- 2009 Rudy Giuliani, New York City mayor
- 2010 Tony Dungy, Tampa Bay Buccaneers and Indianapolis Colts head coach
- 2013 Robert Mueller, FBI director
- 2014 Jeffrey Immelt, General Electric CEO
- 2016 William McRaven, Chancellor, University of Texas System
- 2017 Grant Teaff, AFCA executive director, head coach
- 2018 Jack Lengyel, Head Coach and athletic administrator
- 2019 Verne Lundquist, sportscaster
- 2020 Chuck Neinas, Athletic administrator
- 2022 Brian Hainline, M.D., NCAA chief medical officer
- 2023 Bob Bowlsby, Big 12 commissioner
- 2024 Archie Manning, NFF chairman

== Presidents ==
Maj. Charles Daly of the U.S. Military Academy was the first president of the American Football Coaches Association. He was followed by John Heisman. Other presidents have included Bear Bryant, Darrell Royal, Eddie Robinson, Charles McClendon, Bo Schembechler, Vince Dooley, and Bill Cronin. The current president is Clark Lea, who was elected on January 13, 2026.

== See also ==
- Walter Camp Man of the Year
- Walter Camp Distinguished American Award
- Walter Camp Alumni of the Year
- National Football Foundation Distinguished American Award
- National Football Foundation Gold Medal Winners
- Theodore Roosevelt Award (NCAA)
