= David M. Nelson =

American football expert (1920–1991)

Biographical details
- Born: April 19, 1920; Detroit, Michigan, U.S.
- Died: November 30, 1991 (aged 71); Newark, Delaware, U.S.

Playing career
- 1939–1941: Michigan
- Position: Halfback

Coaching career (HC unless noted)
- 1946–1947: Hillsdale
- 1948: Harvard (backfield)
- 1949–1950: Maine
- 1951–1965: Delaware

Administrative career (AD unless noted)
- 1951–1984: Delaware
- 1989–1991: Yankee Conf. (commissioner)

Head coaching record
- Overall: 105–48–6
- Bowls: 1–0

Accomplishments and honors

Championships
- 1 NCAA College Division National (1963); 2 MIAA (1946–1947); 1 Yankee (1949); 3 Middle Atlantic (1959, 1962–1963)

Awards
- NFF Distinguished American Award (1984); Amos Alonzo Stagg Award (1989)
- College Football Hall of Fame; Inducted in 1987 (profile)

David Moir Nelson (April 29, 1920 – November 30, 1991) was an American football player, coach, college athletics administrator, author, and authority on college football playing rules. He served as the head football coach at Hillsdale College (1946–1947), the University of Maine (1949–1950), and the University of Delaware (1951–1965), compiling a career record of 105–48–6. During his 15 years as the head coach at Delaware, he tallied a mark of 84–42–2 and gained fame as the father of the Wing T offensive formation. From 1951 to 1984, he served as Delaware's athletic director. In 1957, Nelson was named to the National Collegiate Athletic Association Football Rules Committee and in 1962 became its Secretary-Editor, a position he held for 29 years until his death, the longest tenure in Rules Committee history. In this role, he edited the official college football rulebook and provided interpretations on how the playing rules were to be applied to game situations. Nelson was inducted into the College Football Hall of Fame as a coach in 1987.

== Early years and college ==
Nelson was born and raised in Detroit, Michigan. Upon graduation from Northwestern High School in 1938, Nelson enrolled at the University of Michigan. As a 5'7", 155-pound halfback, Nelson played football for Fritz Crisler in the same backfield with fellow Northwestern High alumnus Forest Evashevski, All-American fullback Bob Westfall, and 1940 Heisman Trophy winner Tom Harmon. All four members of this famed backfield have been inducted into the College Football Hall of Fame as either a player or as a coach. In 1941, Nelson led the Wolverines in rushing, averaging 6.3 yards per carry.

Nelson earned a Bachelor of Science degree in 1942 before serving as a lieutenant in the United States Naval Air Corps during World War II. He was awarded three battle stars for his service. After the war, Nelson returned to Michigan as assistant baseball coach, earning a Master of Science degree in 1946.

== Coaching career ==
Nelson was head football coach at Hillsdale College in Michigan from 1946 to 1947, assistant football coach at Harvard University in 1948, and head football coach at the University of Maine from 1949 to 1950. While at Maine, Nelson began to develop the Wing-T formation.

When he took over at Delaware in 1951, Nelson continued to develop the Wing-T along with his assistant coach, Mike Lude, and eventual successor, Tubby Raymond, who joined the Delaware staff the fourth year of the Wing-T offense. Delaware's success included winning the Lambert Cup, awarded to the top small-college team in the East, in 1959, 1962 and 1963. The 1963 team also finished the season as the top small college team in the nation in the United Press International poll. When Nelson retired from coaching after the 1965 season, his career record was 105–48–6.

Nelson's Wing-T formation was adopted by a number of other teams, including Evashevski's Iowa Hawkeyes, who won the Rose Bowl in 1957 and 1959 using the formation. Others who used the Wing-T with success included Paul Dietzel with LSU, Frank Broyles with Arkansas, Ara Parseghian with Notre Dame, Jim Owens with Washington, and Eddie Robinson of Grambling State.

Nelson also brought a unique football helmet design to Delaware. In the 1930s, Nelson's future college coach, Crisler, was the coach at Princeton University and was looking for a way to allow his quarterback to easily locate pass receivers running downfield. At the time, there were no rules requiring schools to wear jerseys of contrasting colors, and helmets were dark leather, so distinguishing teammates from opponents at a glance was difficult. Crisler hit upon the idea of a helmet with a winged pattern on it and had the leather dyed in Princeton's black and orange colors. When Crisler moved to Michigan in 1938—the same year Nelson arrived—he used the same design with Michigan's school colors. Nelson brought the same design, in the appropriate school colors, to Hillsdale, Maine, and Delaware. Delaware continues to use the "Michigan" helmet design to this day.

While at the University of Delaware, Nelson held numerous academic and administrative roles in addition to coaching. These positions include Associate Professor and Professor of Physical Education (1951-1990), Professor Emeritus (1990-1991), Director (1951-1984) and Dean (1981-1990) of Physical Education and Athletics and Recreation, as well as Special Assistant to the President (1989-1990).

== Books and awards ==
Nelson authored a number of books on football, including Scoring Power with the Winged-T Offense (co-authored with Evashevski, 1957), The Modern Winged-T Playbook (with Evashevski, 1961), Football: Principles and Plays (1962), Championship Football by 12 Great Coaches (1962), Dave Nelson Selects 99 Best Plays for High School Football (1966), Dave Nelson Selects the Best of Defensive Football for High Schools (1967), and Illustrated Football Rules (1976). Nelson's final book, The Anatomy of a Game: Football, the Rules, and the Men Who Made the Game, was a year-by-year chronicle of how the collegiate football playing rules evolved from 1876 to 1991. It was published posthumously in 1994.

Nelson's awards include the National Football Foundation Distinguished American Award (1984) and the American Football Coaches Association's Amos Alonzo Stagg Award (1989). He was inducted into the Delaware Sports Hall of Fame in 1978, the University of Michigan Athletic Hall of Honor in 1986, and the College Football Hall of Fame in 1987 for his coaching achievements.

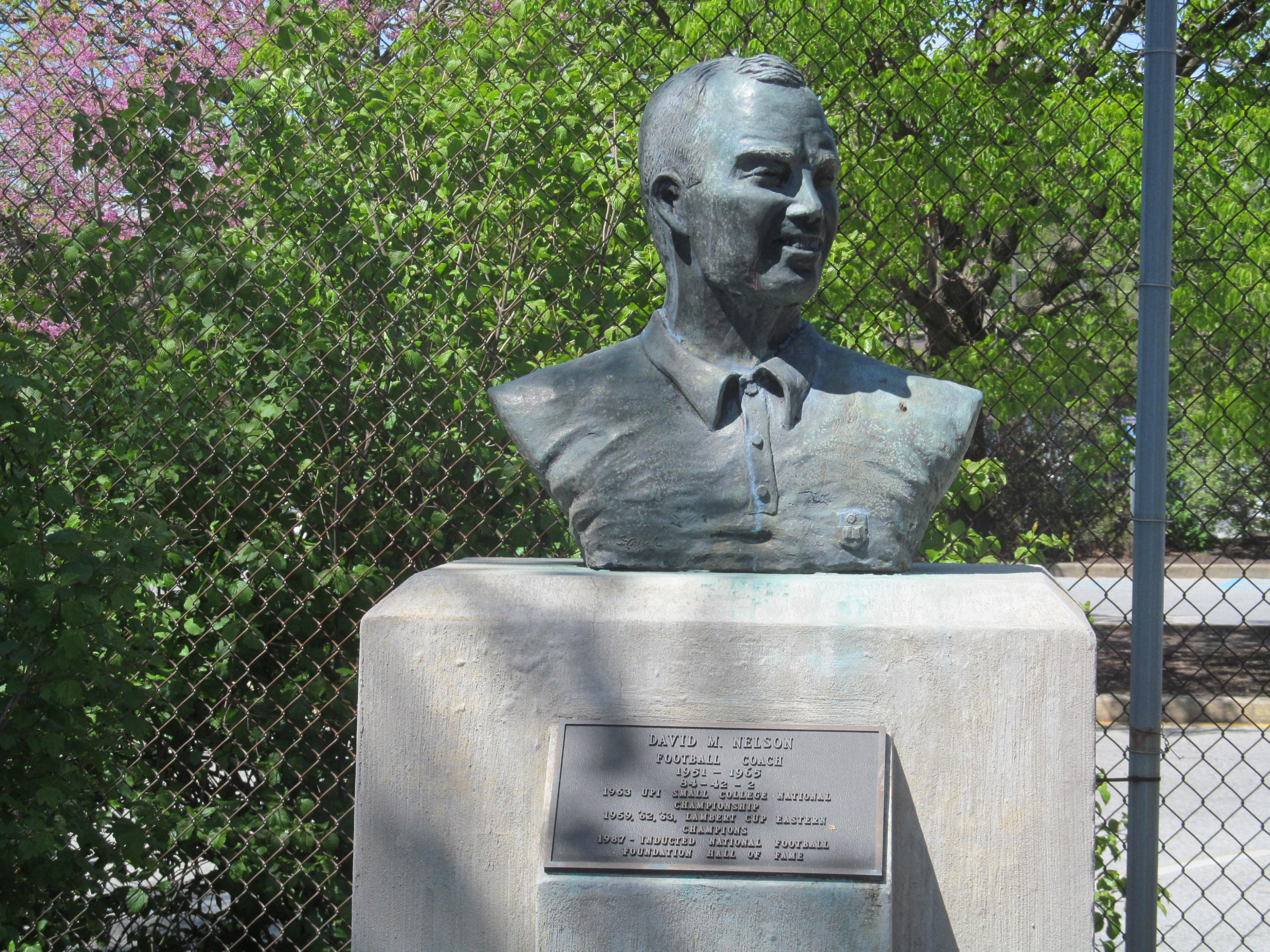
A bust of David M. Nelson at Delaware Stadium and plaque commemorating his record as head coach, National Championship, and College Football Hall of Fame induction.

Nelson's papers are held in Special Collections at the University of Delaware.

== Head coaching record ==
Year	Team	Overall	Conference	Standing	Bowl/playoffs
Hillsdale Dales (Michigan Intercollegiate Athletic Association) (1946–1947)
1946	Hillsdale	7–1	4–1	T–1st	
1947	Hillsdale	7–0–2	3–0–2	T–1st	
Hillsdale:		14–1–2	7–1–2		
Maine Black Bears (Yankee Conference / Maine Intercollegiate Athletic Association) (1949–1950)
1949	Maine	2–4–1	2–0–1 / 0–3	T–1st /	
1950	Maine	5–1–1	3–1 / 2–0–1	2nd	
Maine:		7–5–2	5–1–2 (Yankee); 2–3–1 (MIAA)		
Delaware Fightin' Blue Hens (Independent) (1951–1957)
1951	Delaware	5–3			
1952	Delaware	4–4			
1953	Delaware	7–1			
1954	Delaware	8–2			W Refrigerator
1955	Delaware	8–1			
1956	Delaware	5–3–1			
1957	Delaware	4–3			
Delaware Fightin' Blue Hens (Middle Atlantic Conference) (1958–1965)
1958	Delaware	5–3	2–3	5th (University)	
1959	Delaware	8–1	5–0	1st (University)	
1960	Delaware	2–6–1	1–4	6th (University)	
1961	Delaware	4–4	3–2	T–3rd (University)	
1962	Delaware	7–2	5–0	1st (University)	
1963	Delaware	8–0	4–0	1st (University)	
1964	Delaware	4–5	3–3	4th (University)	
1965	Delaware	5–4	3–3	4th (University)	
Delaware:		84–42–2	26–15		
Total:		105–48–6			
National championship Conference title Conference division title or championship game berth
