= Draddy =

Draddy may refer to:

- Vincent dePaul Draddy (1907–1990), American scholar-athlete at Manhattan College
  - Vincent dePaul Draddy Trophy, a college sports award now known as the William V. Campbell Trophy
- Draddy Gymnasium, a multi-purpose arena in the Bronx, New York, named after Vincent dePaul Draddy
