= Alan Page Community Award =

Award by the NFL Player's Association

The Alan Page Community Award has been awarded by the NFL Players Association (NFLPA) continuously since 1967. Previously named the Byron "Whizzer" White NFL Man of the Year Award, after Byron "Whizzer" White, the award was renamed in the fall of 2018 in honor of Alan Page. Alan Page has been a stalwart for the players union since his early days as an executive committee member as well as a pioneer for social justice during his distinguished 23-year tenure on the Minnesota Supreme Court.

The award annually recognizes one player who goes above and beyond to perform community service in his hometown and team city. Past winners have included Drew Brees, Warrick Dunn, Gale Sayers, Bart Starr, Archie Manning, Peyton Manning and Ken Houston.

The 2001 recipient, Michael McCrary, was the child in the Supreme Court case Runyon v. McCrary (1976) in which Justice White had participated nearly a quarter of a century before McCrary's award. White had dissented from the position taken by the lawyers for McCrary.

== Winners ==
Season	Player	Position	Team
1967	Bart Starr	Quarterback	Green Bay Packers
1968	Willie Davis	Defensive end	Green Bay Packers
1969	Eddie Meador	Safety	Los Angeles Rams
1970	Gale Sayers	Running back	Chicago Bears
1971	Kermit Alexander	Defensive back	Los Angeles Rams
1972	Ray May	Linebacker	Baltimore Colts
1973	Andy Russell	Linebacker	Pittsburgh Steelers
1974	Floyd Little	Running back	Denver Broncos
1975	Rocky Bleier	Running back	Pittsburgh Steelers
1976	Jim Hart	Quarterback	St. Louis Cardinals
1977	Lyle Alzado	Defensive end	Denver Broncos
1978	Archie Manning	Quarterback	New Orleans Saints
1979	Roger Staubach	Quarterback	Dallas Cowboys
1980	Gene Upshaw	Guard	Oakland Raiders
1981	Ken Houston	Safety	Washington Redskins
1982	Franco Harris	Running back	Pittsburgh Steelers
1983	Doug Dieken	Offensive tackle	Cleveland Browns
1984	Rolf Benirschke	Placekicker	San Diego Chargers
1985	Reggie Williams	Linebacker	Cincinnati Bengals
1986	Nat Moore	Wide receiver	Miami Dolphins
1987	George Martin	Defensive end	New York Giants
1988	Deron Cherry	Safety	Kansas City Chiefs
1989	Mike Singletary	Linebacker	Chicago Bears
1990	Ozzie Newsome	Tight end	Cleveland Browns
1991	Mike Kenn	Offensive tackle	Atlanta Falcons
1992	Reggie White	Defensive end	Philadelphia Eagles
1993	Nick Lowery	Placekicker	Kansas City Chiefs
1994	Mark Kelso	Safety	Buffalo Bills
1995	Derrick Thomas	Linebacker	Kansas City Chiefs
1996	Bill Brooks	Wide receiver	Indianapolis Colts
1997	Chris Zorich	Defensive tackle	Chicago Bears
1998	Hardy Nickerson	Linebacker	Tampa Bay Buccaneers
1999	Cris Carter	Wide receiver	Minnesota Vikings
2000	Doug Pelfrey	Placekicker	Cincinnati Bengals
2001	Michael McCrary	Defensive end	Baltimore Ravens
2002	Mark Brunell	Quarterback	Jacksonville Jaguars
2003	Troy Vincent	Cornerback	Philadelphia Eagles
2004	Derrick Brooks	Linebacker	Tampa Bay Buccaneers
2005	Peyton Manning	Quarterback	Indianapolis Colts
2006	Steve McNair	Quarterback	Tennessee Titans
2007	John Lynch	Safety	Denver Broncos
2008	Warrick Dunn	Running back	Atlanta Falcons
2009	Brian Dawkins	Safety	Philadelphia Eagles
2010	Nnamdi Asomugha	Cornerback	Oakland Raiders
2011	Tony Richardson	Fullback	New York Jets
2012	Drew Brees	Quarterback	New Orleans Saints
2013	Charlie Batch	Quarterback	Pittsburgh Steelers
2014	Anquan Boldin	Wide receiver	San Francisco 49ers
2015	Chad Greenway	Linebacker	Minnesota Vikings
2016	Thomas Davis	Linebacker	Carolina Panthers
2017	Malcolm Jenkins	Safety	Philadelphia Eagles
2018	Chris Long	Defensive end	Philadelphia Eagles
2019	Andrew Whitworth	Offensive tackle	Los Angeles Rams
2020	Brandon Copeland	Linebacker	New York Jets
2021	Hayden Hurst	Tight end	Atlanta Falcons
2022	Rodney McLeod	Safety	Philadelphia Eagles
2023	Damar Hamlin	Safety	Buffalo Bills
2024	Calais Campbell	Defensive end	Miami Dolphins
2025	Darius Slayton	Wide receiver	New York Giants
2026	Garett Bolles	Offensive tackle	Denver Broncos

== See also ==
- Walter Camp Man of the Year
- Walter Camp Distinguished American Award
- Walter Camp Alumni of the Year
- Amos Alonzo Stagg Award
- National Football Foundation Distinguished American Award
- National Football Foundation Gold Medal winners
- Theodore Roosevelt Award (NCAA)
- Walter Payton Man of the Year Award
- Bart Starr Award
- List of NFL awards
