= Walter Payton NFL Man of the Year =

National Football League award

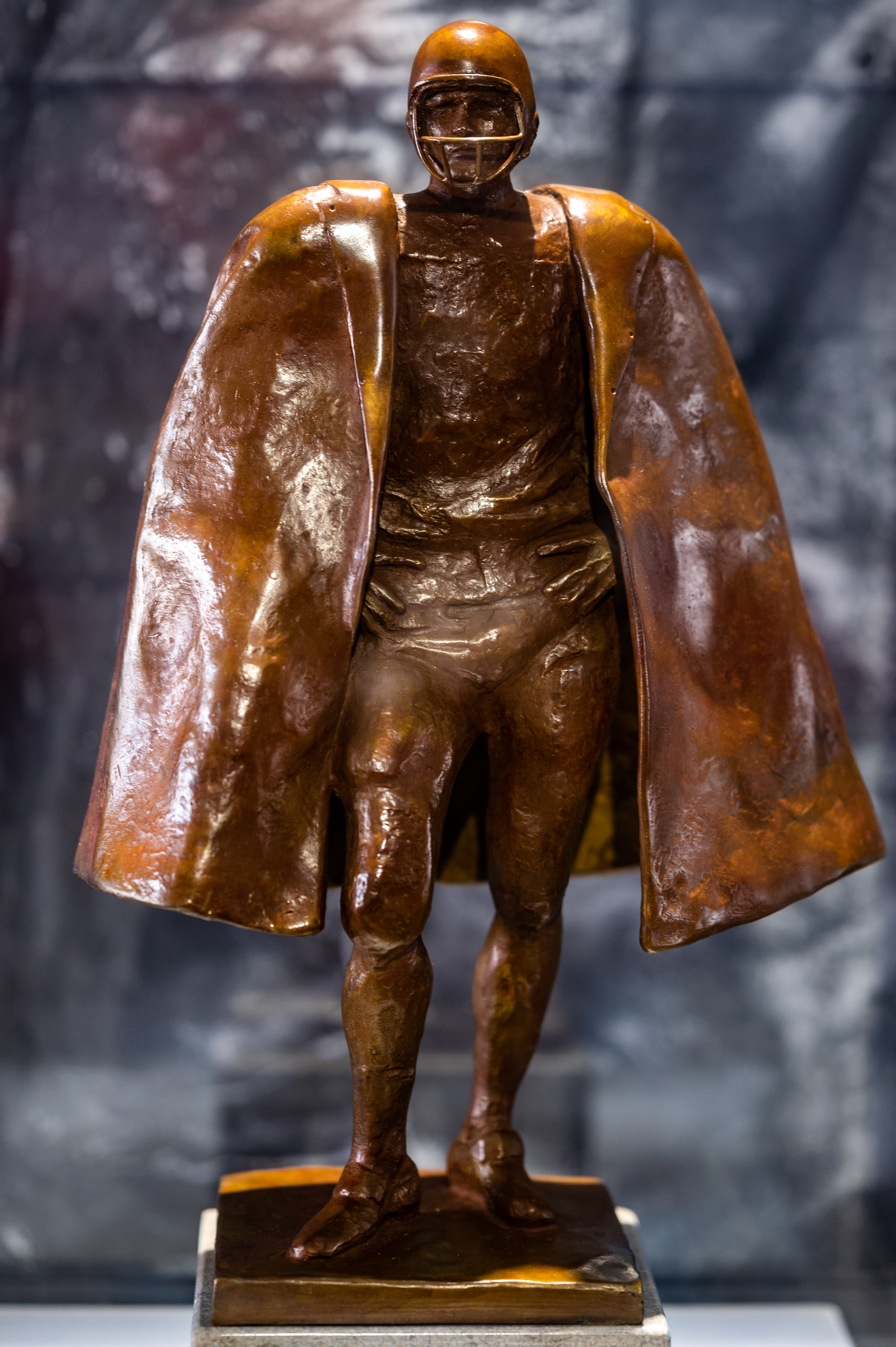
- Awarded for: Excellence off the field regarding an NFL player's charity work
- Presented by: National Football League

History
- First award: Johnny Unitas QB, 1970
- Editions: 56 winners as of the 2026 NFL season
- Most recent: Bobby Wagner LB, 2025
- Website: www.nfl.com/manoftheyear/

Award logo

Walter Payton NFL Man of the Year is an award presented annually by the National Football League (NFL) honoring a player's commitment to philanthropy and community impact, as well as his excellence on the field. Prior to 1999, it was called simply the NFL Man of the Year Award. Shortly after Chicago Bears running back Walter Payton died in 1999 (having been the 1977 recipient himself), the award was renamed to honor his legacy as a humanitarian.

The NFL Man of the Year trophy was created in 1969 by artist Daniel Bennett Schwartz, depicting an undistinguished caped lineman standing alone on the sidelines, outside of game action. While offensive lineman Steve Wright was used as a model for the sculpture, the trophy has never been intended to specifically resemble anybody, symbolizing that the award is meant to recognize any player. This includes players who may perform in a lower-profile playing position outside the spotlight, and whose humanitarian contributions and efforts are worthy.

Each year, a winner is selected from 32 nominees from the 32 different teams. A panel of judges, which includes the Commissioner of the NFL, the previous year's winner, and a number of former players select the winner of the award. The Man of the Year winner receives a $250,000 donation in his name to a charity of his choice. The other 31 finalists also receive donations in their name of $50,000 each to charities of their choice. The Kansas City Chiefs, Pittsburgh Steelers, and Chicago Bears have had more winners of the award than any other teams, with five winners each.

Since 2017, previous winners who are currently active in the league wear a patch depicting the trophy on their uniforms for the rest of their NFL careers. The current active winners (in chronological order) are Calais Campbell, Dak Prescott, Cameron Heyward, Arik Armstead and Bobby Wagner. Once the 32 nominees are announced, each of them is given a small helmet decal depicting the trophy to wear for the remainder of that season. Recent winners have also been acknowledged during the Super Bowl pre-game ceremony before "America the Beautiful" and "The Star-Spangled Banner".

The NFL describes the award as its "most prestigious accolade" and recipients of the award sometimes place it among their most cherished.

== Winners ==
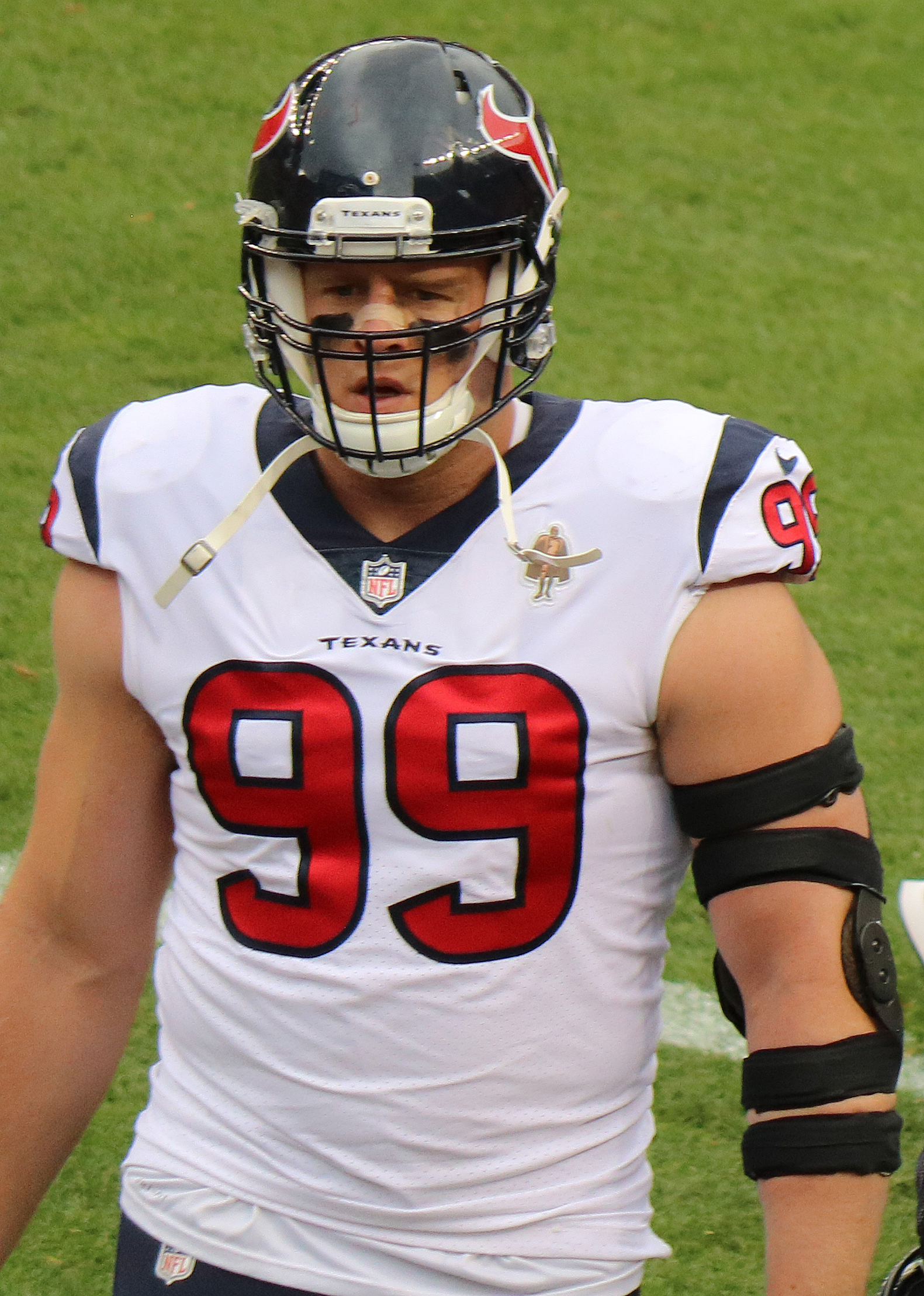
J. J. Watt, the 2017 Walter Payton Man of the Year recipient. The special uniform patch is visible.

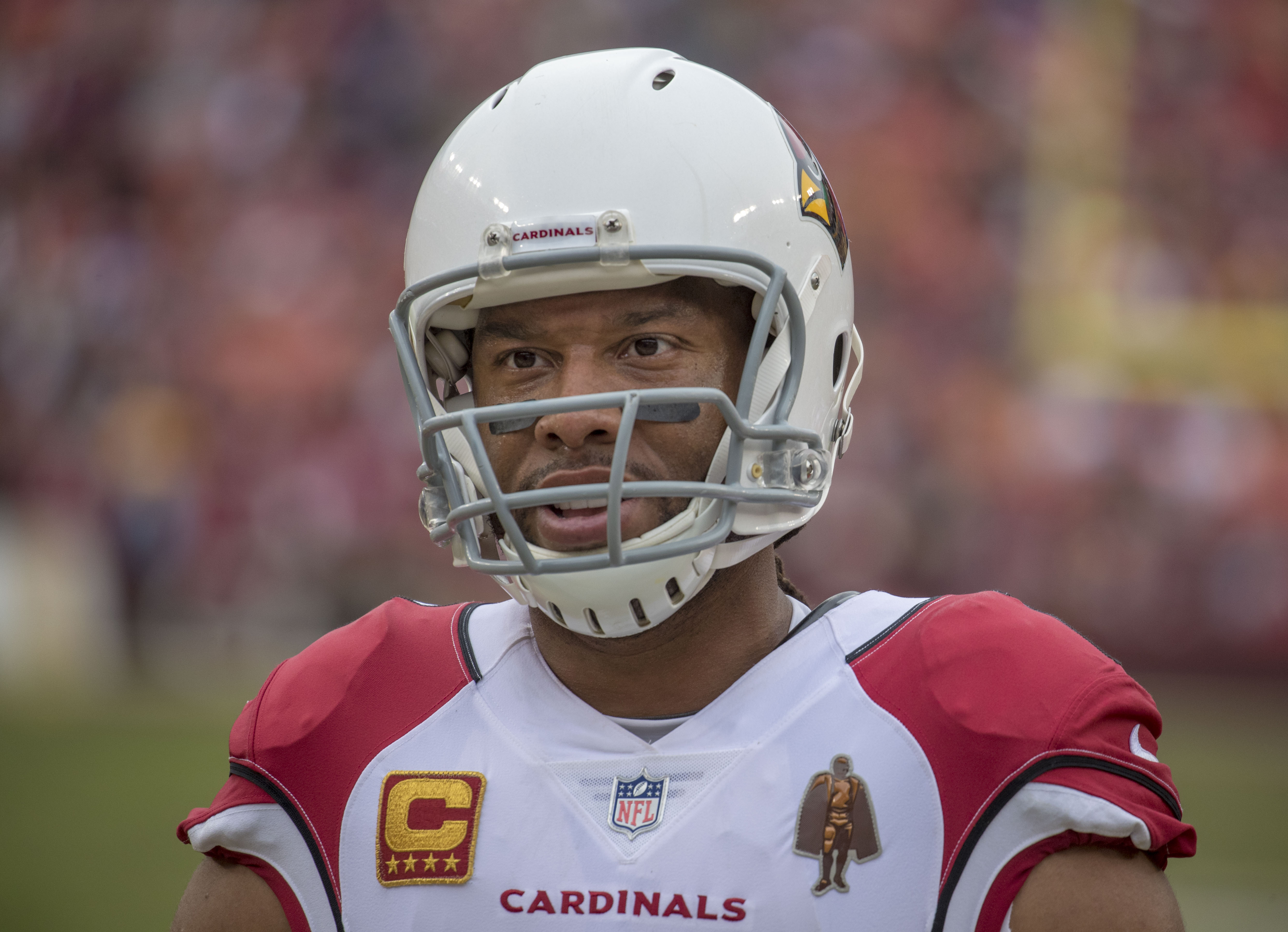
Larry Fitzgerald, 2016 co-recipient, with team captain uniform patch (player's right), and Man of the Year patch (player's left).

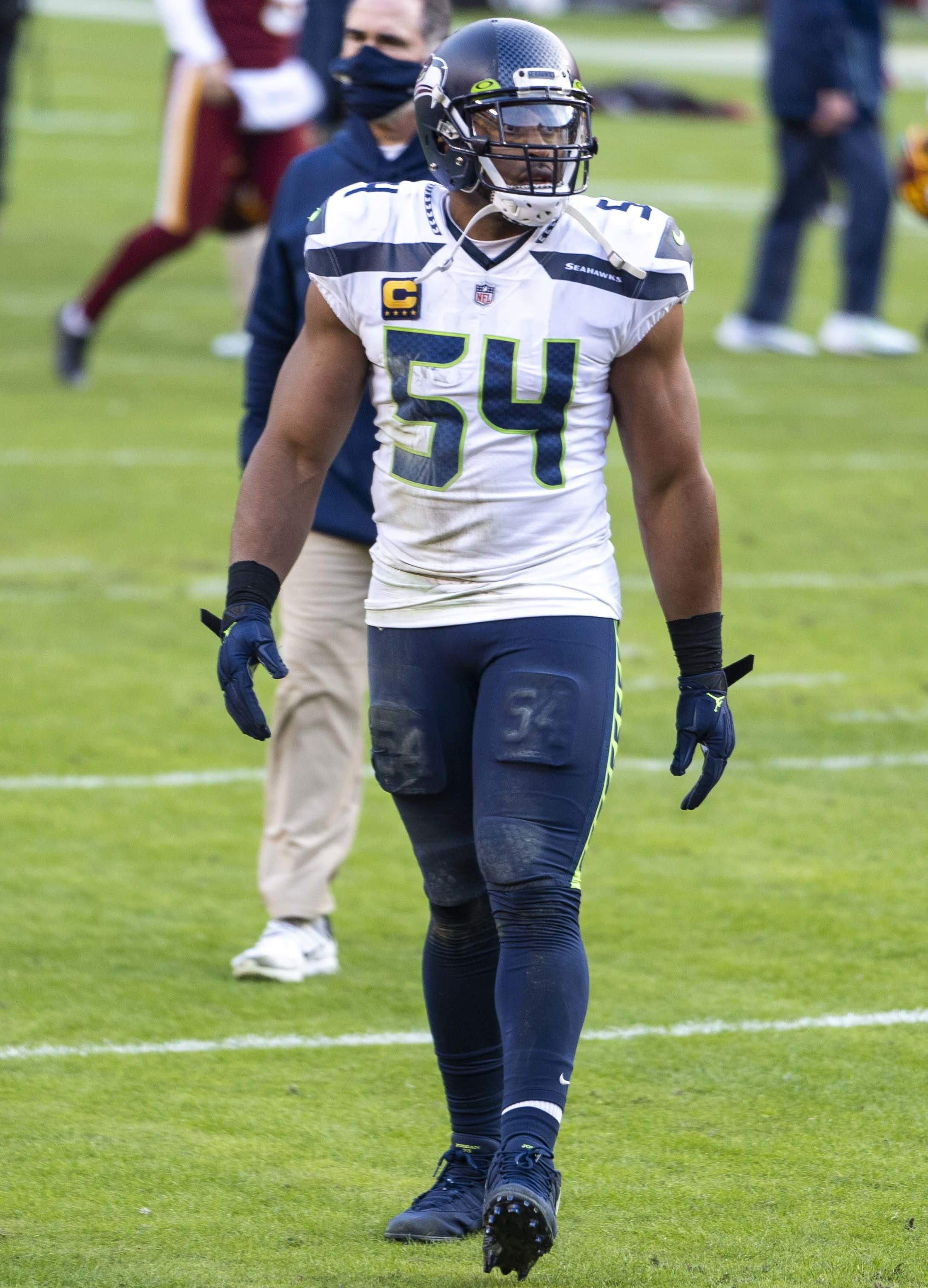
Bobby Wagner, the most recent Walter Payton Man of the Year recipient.

List of Walter Payton NFL Man of the Year winners
Year	Player	Position	Team	Ref
1970	Johnny Unitas	Quarterback	Baltimore Colts	
1971	John Hadl	Quarterback	San Diego Chargers	
1972	Willie Lanier	Linebacker	Kansas City Chiefs	
1973	Len Dawson	Quarterback	Kansas City Chiefs	
1974	George Blanda	Quarterback	Oakland Raiders	
1975	Ken Anderson	Quarterback	Cincinnati Bengals	
1976	Franco Harris	Running back	Pittsburgh Steelers	
1977	Walter Payton	Running back	Chicago Bears	
1978	Roger Staubach	Quarterback	Dallas Cowboys	
1979	Joe Greene	Defensive tackle	Pittsburgh Steelers	
1980	Harold Carmichael	Wide receiver	Philadelphia Eagles	
1981	Lynn Swann	Wide receiver	Pittsburgh Steelers	
1982	Joe Theismann	Quarterback	Washington Redskins	
1983	Rolf Benirschke	Kicker	San Diego Chargers	
1984	Marty Lyons	Defensive tackle	New York Jets	
1985	Dwight Stephenson	Center	Miami Dolphins	
1986	Reggie Williams	Linebacker	Cincinnati Bengals	
1987	Dave Duerson	Safety	Chicago Bears	
1988	Steve Largent	Wide receiver	Seattle Seahawks	
1989	Warren Moon	Quarterback	Houston Oilers	
1990	Mike Singletary	Linebacker	Chicago Bears	
1991	Anthony Muñoz	Offensive tackle	Cincinnati Bengals	
1992	John Elway	Quarterback	Denver Broncos	
1993	Derrick Thomas	Linebacker	Kansas City Chiefs	
1994	Junior Seau	Linebacker	San Diego Chargers	
1995	Boomer Esiason	Quarterback	New York Jets	
1996	Darrell Green	Cornerback	Washington Redskins	
1997	Troy Aikman	Quarterback	Dallas Cowboys	
1998	Dan Marino	Quarterback	Miami Dolphins	
1999	Cris Carter	Wide receiver	Minnesota Vikings	
2000	Derrick Brooks	Linebacker	Tampa Bay Buccaneers	
2000	Jim Flanigan	Defensive tackle	Chicago Bears	
2001	Jerome Bettis	Running back	Pittsburgh Steelers	
2002	Troy Vincent	Cornerback	Philadelphia Eagles	
2003	Will Shields	Offensive guard	Kansas City Chiefs	
2004	Warrick Dunn	Running back	Atlanta Falcons	
2005	Peyton Manning	Quarterback	Indianapolis Colts	
2006	Drew Brees	Quarterback	New Orleans Saints	
2006	LaDainian Tomlinson	Running back	San Diego Chargers	
2007	Jason Taylor	Defensive end	Miami Dolphins	
2008	Kurt Warner	Quarterback	Arizona Cardinals	
2009	Brian Waters	Offensive guard	Kansas City Chiefs	
2010	Madieu Williams	Safety	Minnesota Vikings	
2011	Matt Birk	Center	Baltimore Ravens	
2012	Jason Witten	Tight end	Dallas Cowboys	
2013	Charles Tillman	Cornerback	Chicago Bears	
2014	Thomas Davis Sr.	Linebacker	Carolina Panthers	
2015	Anquan Boldin	Wide receiver	San Francisco 49ers	
2016	Larry Fitzgerald	Wide receiver	Arizona Cardinals	
2016	Eli Manning	Quarterback	New York Giants	
2017	J. J. Watt	Defensive end	Houston Texans	
2018	Chris Long	Defensive end	Philadelphia Eagles	
2019	Calais Campbell	Defensive end	Jacksonville Jaguars	
2020	Russell Wilson	Quarterback	Seattle Seahawks	
2021	Andrew Whitworth	Offensive tackle	Los Angeles Rams	
2022	Dak Prescott	Quarterback	Dallas Cowboys	
2023	Cameron Heyward	Defensive tackle	Pittsburgh Steelers	
2024	Arik Armstead	Defensive end	Jacksonville Jaguars	
2025	Bobby Wagner	Linebacker	Washington Commanders	

== See also ==
- Alan Page Community Award
- Walter Camp Man of the Year
- Walter Camp Distinguished American Award
- Walter Camp Alumni of the Year
- Amos Alonzo Stagg Award
- National Football Foundation Distinguished American Award
- National Football Foundation Gold Medal winners
- Theodore Roosevelt Award
- Bart Starr Award
- Laureus Sport for Good Award
- List of NFL awards
