= Amos Alonzo Stagg Award =

American football award

- Awarded for: the "individual, group or institution whose services have been outstanding in the advancement of the best interests of football."
- Country: United States
- Presented by: American Football Coaches Association (AFCA)

History
- First award: 1940
- Most recent: Lee Corso
- Website: http://www.afca.com/article/article.php?id=StaggAward

There is a separate "Amos Alonzo Stagg Coaching Award".

The Amos Alonzo Stagg Award is presented annually by the American Football Coaches Association (AFCA) to the "individual, group or institution whose services have been outstanding in the advancement of the best interests of football". Recipients receive a plaque which is a replica of the one given to Stagg at the 1939 AFCA Convention in tribute to his 50 years of service to football. The purpose of the award is "to perpetuate the example and influence of Amos Alonzo Stagg".

The award is named in honor of Amos Alonzo Stagg, who was instrumental in founding the AFCA in the 1920s. Stagg is considered one of the great innovators and motivating forces in the early development of the game of football and had one of the longest head coaching tenures in the history of the college game.

== Winners ==
- 1940 Donald Herring Jr.
- 1941 Butch Cowell (posthumously)
- 1942 No award given
- 1943 No award given
- 1944 No award given
- 1945 No award given
- 1946 Grantland Rice
- 1947 William Alexander
- 1948 Gil Dobie, Pop Warner, Robert Zuppke
- 1949 Dick Harlow
- 1950 No award given
- 1951 Tuss McLaughry
- 1952 Bo McMillin
- 1953 Lou Little
- 1954 Dana X. Bible
- 1955 Joseph J. Tomlin
- 1956 No award given
- 1957 Robert Neyland
- 1958 Bernie Bierman
- 1959 John Wilce
- 1960 Harvey Harman
- 1961 Ray Eliot
- 1962 Tad Wieman
- 1963 Andrew Kerr
- 1964 Don Faurot
- 1965 Harry Stuhldreher
- 1966 Bernie Moore
- 1967 Jess Neely
- 1968 Abe Martin
- 1969 Rip Engle
- 1970 Pappy Waldorf
- 1971 William D. Murray
- 1972 Jack Curtice
- 1973 Lloyd Jordan
- 1974 Jake Gaither
- 1975 Gerald B. Zornow
- 1976 No award given
- 1977 Ben Schwartzwalder
- 1978 Tom Hamilton
- 1979 Fritz Crisler
- 1980 No award given
- 1981 Fred Russell
- 1982 Eddie Robinson
- 1983 Bear Bryant
- 1984 Bud Wilkinson
- 1985 Duffy Daugherty
- 1986 Woody Hayes
- 1987 Field Scovell
- 1988 Herb McCracken
- 1989 David M. Nelson
- 1990 Len Casanova
- 1991 Bob Blackman
- 1992 Charles McClendon
- 1993 Keith Jackson
- 1994 Bob Devaney
- 1995 John Merritt (posthumously)
- 1996 Chuck Neinas
- 1997 Ara Parseghian
- 1998 Bob Reade
- 1999 Bo Schembechler
- 2000 Tom Osborne
- 2001 Vince Dooley
- 2002 Joe Paterno
- 2003 LaVell Edwards
- 2004 Ron Schipper
- 2005 Hayden Fry
- 2006 Grant Teaff
- 2007 Bill Curry
- 2008 Bill Walsh (posthumously)
- 2009 John Gagliardi
- 2010 Darrell Royal
- 2011 Bobby Bowden
- 2012 Fisher DeBerry
- 2013 Frosty Westering
- 2014 R. C. Slocum
- 2015 Ken Hatfield
- 2016 John Cooper
- 2017 Don Nehlen
- 2018 Frank Broyles (posthumously)
- 2019 Marv Levy
- 2020 Dick Tomey (posthumously)
- 2021 No award given
- 2022 Mel Tjeerdsma
- 2023 Roy Kidd
- 2024 Larry Kehres
- 2025 Bob Ford
- 2026 Lee Corso

== See also ==
- Walter Camp Man of the Year
- Walter Camp Distinguished American Award
- Walter Camp Alumni of the Year
- National Football Foundation Distinguished American Award
- National Football Foundation Gold Medal Winners
- Theodore Roosevelt Award (NCAA)
- Walter Payton Man of the Year Award
- "Whizzer" White NFL Man of the Year Award
