= Zable =

Zable is a surname. Notable people with the surname include:

- Arnold Zable (born 1947), Australian writer, novelist, and human rights activist
- Walter J. Zable (1915–2012), American businessman, entrepreneur, and athlete

== See also ==
- Zable Stadium, sports venue in Williamsburg, Virginia
