= Tom Hamilton (American football) =

American football player (1905–1994)

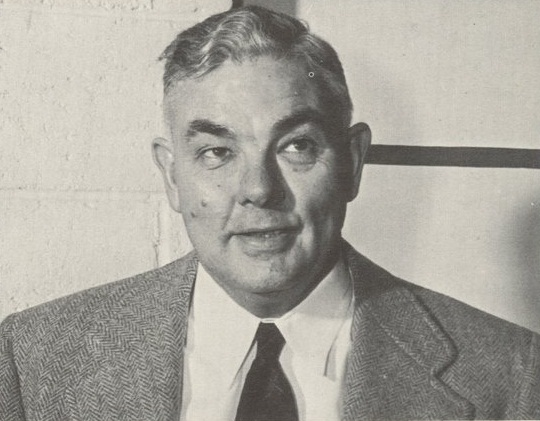
- Hamilton from 1956 Owl (Pittsburgh yearbook)

Biographical details
- Born: December 26, 1905; Hoopeston, Illinois, U.S.
- Died: April 3, 1994 (aged 88); Chula Vista, California, U.S.

Playing career
- 1924–1926: Navy
- Position: Halfback

Coaching career (HC unless noted)
- 1934–1936: Navy
- 1946–1947: Navy
- 1951: Pittsburgh
- 1954: Pittsburgh

Administrative career (AD unless noted)
- 1948–1949: Navy
- 1949–1959: Pittsburgh
- 1959–1971: AAWU/Pac-8 (commissioner)

Head coaching record
- Overall: 28–32–1

Accomplishments and honors

Awards
- Corbett Award (1971); ECAC James Lynah Award (1971); NFF Gold Medal (1971); Theodore Roosevelt Award (1976); Amos Alonzo Stagg Award (1978); First-team All-American (1926)
- College Football Hall of Fame; Inducted in 1965 (profile)
- Military career
- Allegiance: United States
- Branch: U.S. Navy
- Rank: Rear admiral
- Unit: USS Enterprise
- Commands: Commander of USS Enterprise, July 10 – 29, 1944
- Conflicts: World War II: Battle of Leyte Gulf, Battle of Iwo Jima

Thomas James Hamilton (December 26, 1905 – April 3, 1994) was an American football player, coach, college athletics administrator, and naval aviator who rose to the rank of rear admiral in the United States Navy. He was the head coach at the United States Naval Academy from 1934 to 1936 and again from 1946 to 1947 and at the University of Pittsburgh in 1951 and 1954, compiling a career college football record of 28–32–1.

Hamilton was also the athletic director at the Naval Academy from 1948 to 1948 and at Pittsburgh from 1949 to 1959. From 1959 to 1971, he was the commissioner of the Athletic Association of Western Universities (AAWU), renamed the Pacific-8 Conference in 1968 and now the Pac-12 Conference. Hamilton was inducted into the College Football Hall of Fame as a player in 1965.

== Early life and playing career ==
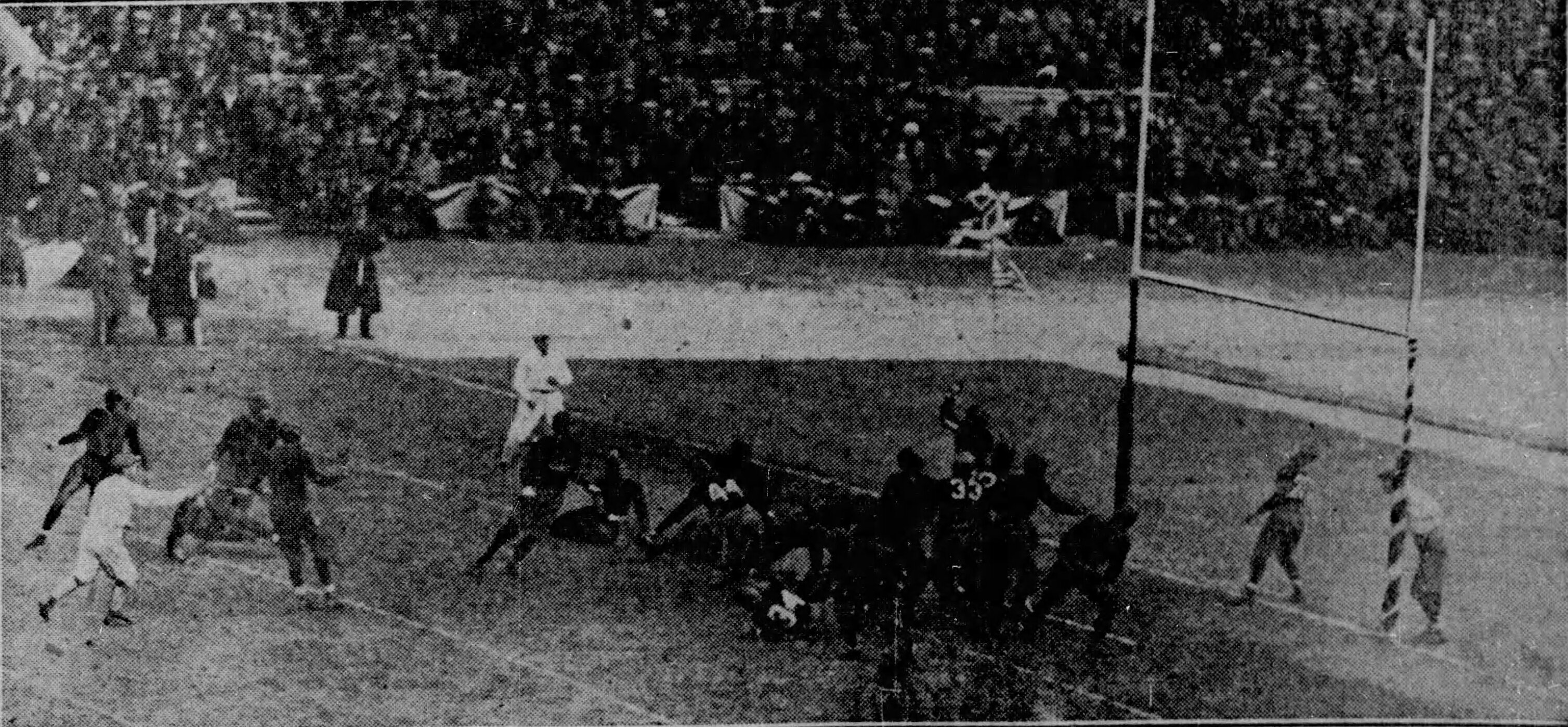
Hamilton kicking a field goal during the 1926 Army–Navy Game held at Soldier Field in Chicago

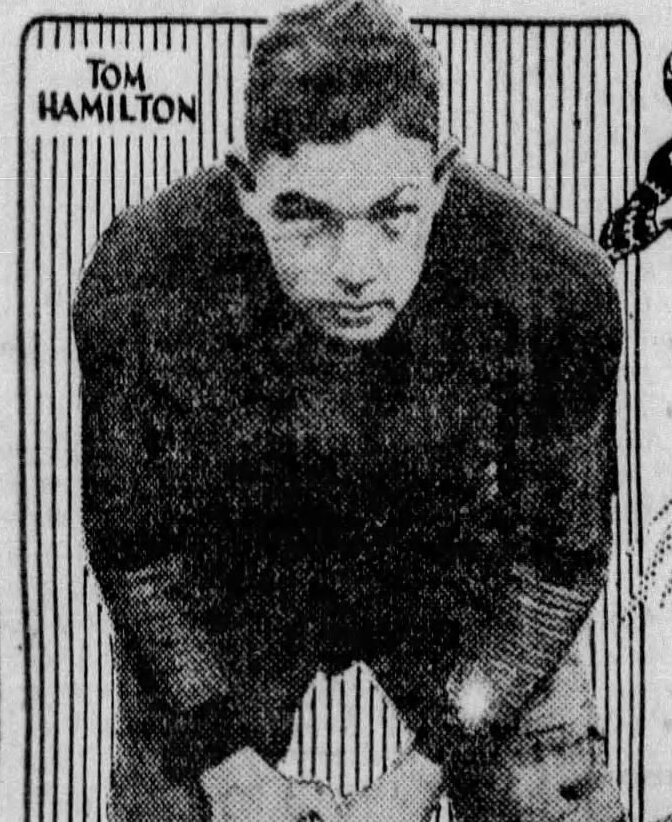
Hamilton as a football player for Navy, circa 1926

Born in Hoopeston, Illinois, Hamilton attended high school in Columbus and Granville, Ohio. He attended the United States Naval Academy, graduating in 1927, and was a key player on the 1926 football squad that won a national championship with a 9–0–1 record. The single blemish on that season was a tie with Army in the 1926 Army–Navy Game, a game which has been described as "one of the greatest football games ever played." Hamilton was regarded to have been one of the star players of that game. Bill Libby's 1973 book Champions of College Football identifies Hamilton and Frank Wickhorst as the two most outstanding players of Navy's 1926 season.

== Military career ==
Following graduation from Annapolis and commissioning as an ensign, Hamilton served the required period in surface ships before applying for flight training. He qualified as a naval aviator and flew a variety of aircraft, including patrol planes from San Diego in 1938 and 1939.

During World War II, Hamilton served ashore and afloat, primarily in aviation training and aboard the aircraft carrier USS Enterprise. He was her flight deck officer and executive officer in 1943 and 1944, commanding the ship during a brief refit in 1944.

== Coaching and sports administration career ==
In 1934, Hamilton became the 21st head football coach at his alma mater, and served as head coach at Navy for a total of five years—three years in his first stint from 1934 through 1936 and two more in 1946 and 1947. Hamilton moved on to become athletic director at Navy in 1948, a position which he held for two years before leaving to accept a similar position at the University of Pittsburgh, serving there until 1959. Twice during his tenure at Pitt, in 1951 and 1954, he also was the head coach of the football team.

Hamilton left Pitt in 1959 to take on the role of founding commissioner of the new Athletic Association of Western Universities (AAWU), which later became the Pacific-8 Conference and eventually the Pac-12 Conference, a position which he held until 1971. He served as chairman of the President's Council on Physical Fitness, served 16 years on the U.S Olympic Committee, and was vice-president of the National Football Foundation.

== Awards ==
Hamilton received the Theodore Roosevelt Award from the NCAA, the Stagg Award from the American Football Coaches Association, the Gold Medal from the National Football Foundation, the Corbett Award from the National Association of Collegiate Directors of Athletics and the James Lynah Award from the Eastern College Athletic Conference. In 1976, he was inducted into the San Diego Hall of Champions.

== Personal life ==
Hamilton was married to Emmie Spalding in 1932 and is buried in the Naval Academy cemetery.

== Head coaching record ==
Year	Team	Overall	Conference	Standing	Bowl/playoffs	AP^{#}
Navy Midshipmen (Independent) (1934–1936)
1934	Navy	8–1				
1935	Navy	5–4				
1936	Navy	6–3				18
Navy Midshipmen (Independent) (1946–1947)
1946	Navy	1–8				
1947	Navy	1–7–1				
Navy:		21–23–1				
Pittsburgh Panthers (Independent) (1951)
1951	Pittsburgh	3–7				
Pittsburgh Panthers (Independent) (1954)
1954	Pittsburgh	4–2				
Pittsburgh:		7–9				
Total:		28–32–1				
^{#}Rankings from final AP Poll.

== See also ==
- List of college football head coaches with non-consecutive tenure
