= Andrew Whitworth =

American football player (born 1981)

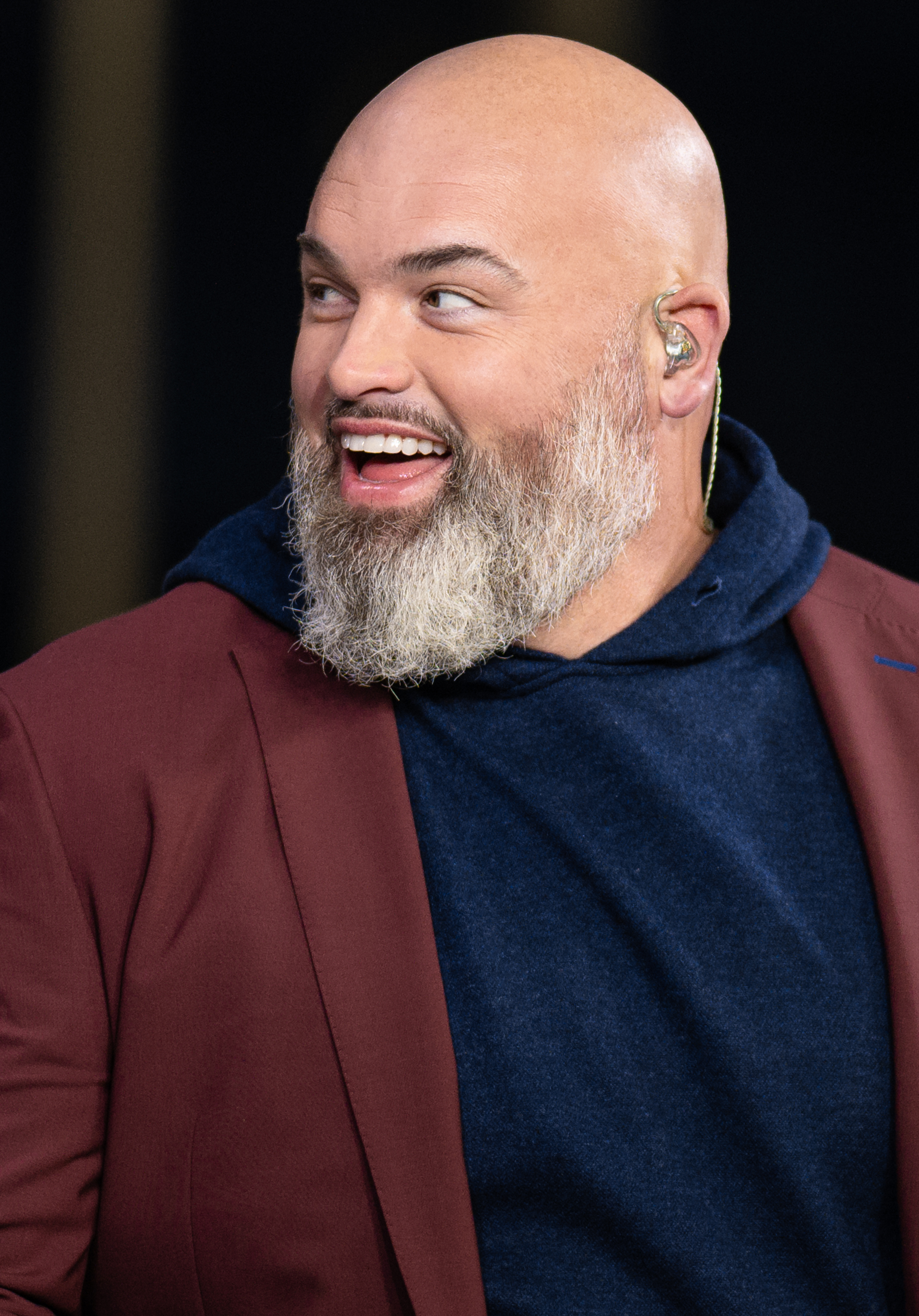
- Whitworth in 2023

No. 77
- Position: Tackle

Personal information
- Born: December 12, 1981 (age 44); Monroe, Louisiana, U.S.
- Listed height: 6 ft 7 in (2.01 m)
- Listed weight: 330 lb (150 kg)

Career information
- High school: West Monroe (West Monroe, Louisiana)
- College: LSU (2001–2005)
- NFL draft: 2006: 2nd round, 55th overall pick

Career history
- Cincinnati Bengals (2006–2016); Los Angeles Rams (2017–2021)

Awards and highlights
- Super Bowl champion (LVI); Walter Payton NFL Man of the Year (2021); 2× First-team All-Pro (2015, 2017); Second-team All-Pro (2014); 4× Pro Bowl (2012, 2015–2017); NFLPA Alan Page Community Award (2019); Built Ford Tough Offensive Line of the Year (2018); BCS national champion (2003); Second-team All-American (2005); 2× First-team All-SEC (2004, 2005)

Career NFL statistics
- Games played: 239
- Games started: 235
- Fumble recoveries: 8
- Receptions: 1
- Receiving yards: 1
- Receiving touchdowns: 1
- Stats at Pro Football Reference

Andrew James Whitworth (born December 12, 1981) is an American former professional football tackle who played in the National Football League (NFL) for 16 seasons. He spent 11 seasons with the Cincinnati Bengals and five with the Los Angeles Rams. Noted for the longevity of his career, he retired as the oldest tackle in NFL history and was the oldest offensive lineman to win a Super Bowl.

Whitworth played college football for the LSU Tigers, receiving second-team All-American honors in 2005. He was selected by the Bengals in the second round of the 2006 NFL draft. During his Cincinnati tenure, he was named to three Pro Bowls and one first-team All-Pro. With the Rams, Whitworth extended his Pro Bowl selections to four and his first-team All-Pro honors to two. He was also a member of the Rams team that won Super Bowl LVI, his final NFL game.

== Early life ==
A native of Monroe, Louisiana, Whitworth attended West Monroe High School in West Monroe, Louisiana, where he played high school football for the Rebels under coach Don Shows and graduated in 2000. He was a part of three Louisiana Class 5A State Championship teams in 1997, 1998, and 1999 when the school was listed by the National High School Football Tony Poll as national champions for the last two. He was also part of four straight district championship teams in one of the toughest districts in the state. Whitworth was rated by CNNSI.com as the sixth-best offensive line prospect in the nation. He was a tennis champion in Louisiana, and was also an excellent golfer. He participated in the first-ever U.S. Army All-American Bowl game on December 30, 2000, along with other future LSU players Marcus Spears, Marquise Hill, and Ben Wilkerson.

== College career ==
Whitworth attended LSU from 2001 to 2005. Whitworth did not play in the 2001 season as he was redshirted. In 2002, he started as a redshirt freshman every game, and was recognized as a first-team Freshman All-American by The Sporting News and Football Writers Association. As a sophomore in 2003, he started in all fourteen games. The team went 13–1 en route to a BCS national title with a Sugar Bowl defeat of Oklahoma. He led the team with 1,008 snaps and credited with 105 key blocks, including 82 knockdowns. In 2004, Whitworth led the team with 799 snaps from scrimmage as the Tigers went 9–3 with a Citrus Bowl berth against Iowa. His play was key for an offense that scored 39 TDs and averaged 395.6 yards per game. He was credited with 96 key blocks, including 66 knockdowns, and played every offensive snap during a four-game stretch against Georgia, Florida, Troy, and Vanderbilt. Helping LSU to an 11–2 record, he played left tackle in 2005. That season was capped by a 40–3 Peach Bowl win over Miami (Fla.). He played every offensive snap in nine of the thirteen contests, for an offense that averaged 374.1 yards per game. By not allowing a sack all season, he finished his career with 22 straight games of no sacks allowed. He was credited with 104 key blocks/knockdowns. Whitworth played in the East–West Shrine Game on January 21, 2006, in San Antonio, Texas.

His 52 career starts from 2002 to 2005 rank second in NCAA Division I history behind Derrick Strait of Oklahoma (53 starts, 2000–2003). He earned All-Southeastern Conference first-team honors in each of his last two seasons, including a consensus nod as a senior.

== Professional career ==
Pre-draft measurables
| Height | Weight | Arm length | Hand span | 40-yard dash | 10-yard split | 20-yard split | 20-yard shuttle | Three-cone drill | Vertical jump | Broad jump | Bench press |
|---|---|---|---|---|---|---|---|---|---|---|---|
| 6 ft 7 in (2.01 m) | 334 lb (151 kg) | 35 in (0.89 m) | 10 1/8 in (0.26 m) | 5.17 s | 1.83 s | 2.98 s | 4.83 s | 8.23 s | 30.5 in (0.77 m) | 9 ft 4 in (2.84 m) | 28 reps |
All values from NFL Combine

=== Cincinnati Bengals ===
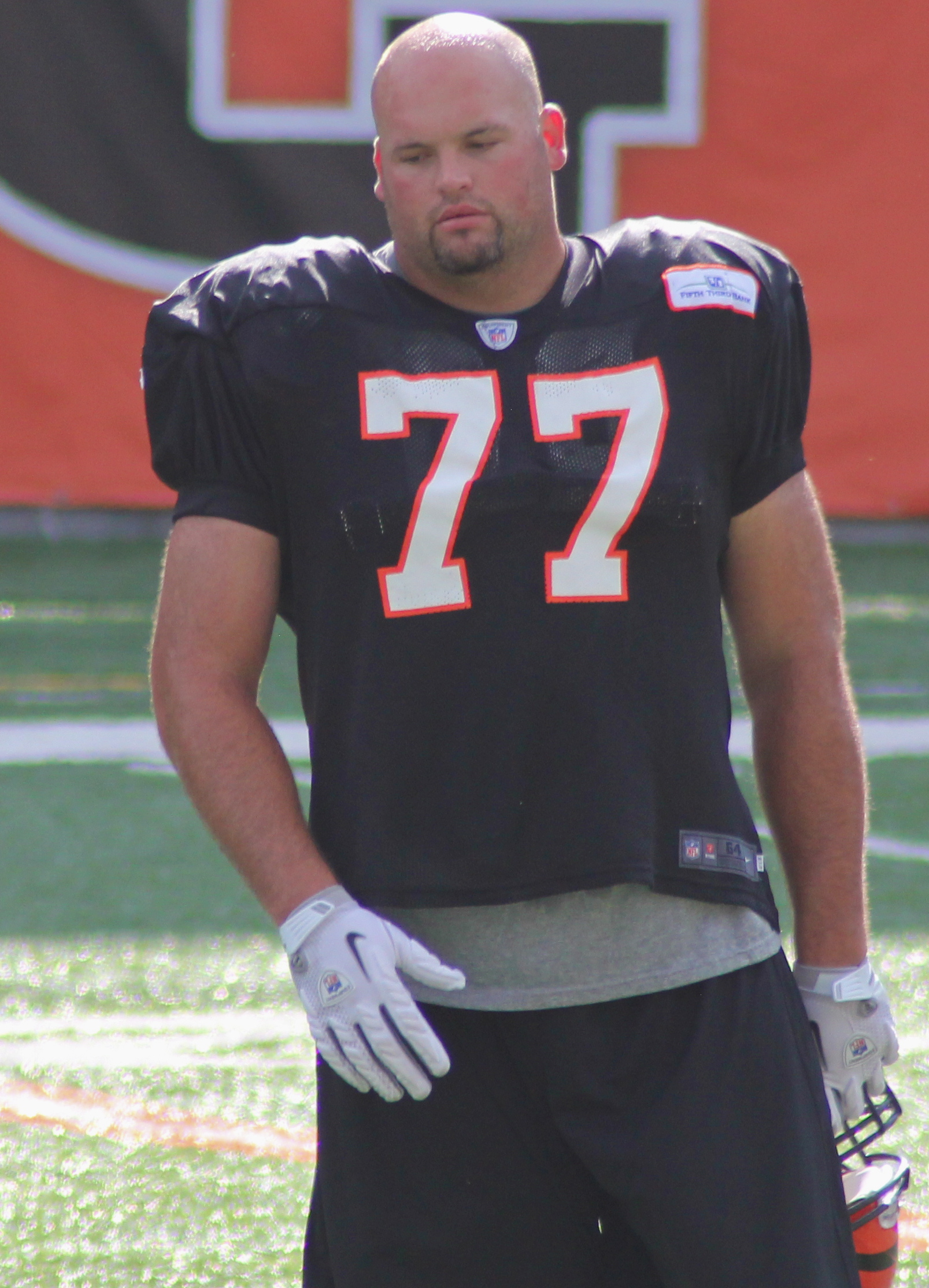
Whitworth at Bengals training camp in 2012

Whitworth was selected by the Cincinnati Bengals in the second round (55th overall) in the 2006 NFL draft. He made his NFL debut on special teams on September 10 against Kansas City. He started at left guard in the following week against the Cleveland Browns, as part of a line shuffle where left guard Eric Steinbach replaced injured Levi Jones at left tackle. Whitworth helped the Bengals pile up 481 yards against Browns, including 145 rushing yards by Rudi Johnson. He was in the starting lineup for Carson Palmer. He also had a key block on Rudi Johnson's seven-yard touchdown run in first quarter.

On July 25, 2008, Whitworth agreed in principle to a four-year extension worth a reported $30 million that would keep him in Cincinnati through 2013. He was ejected from a regular season game against the Jacksonville Jaguars after getting into a fight with Jaguars defensive end John Henderson.

In 2009, head coach decided to move Whitworth from guard to left tackle and saw immediate impact. He started all sixteen games of the season, allowing just five sacks and helping running back Cedric Benson have a breakout year rushing for 1,251 yards. On December 12, 2010, Whitworth caught a one-yard touchdown pass from Carson Palmer against the Pittsburgh Steelers. It was the first of his career, and he was the first Bengals offensive lineman to catch a touchdown pass since 1995.

He was ejected from a game against the Oakland Raiders after throwing a punch during a skirmish late in the game. He was subsequently fined $26,260 for the incident.

In January 2013, for the first time in his career, Whitworth was named a left tackle on the AFC Pro Bowl team.

During the 2014 season, Whitworth allowed zero sacks and only one hit on quarterback Andy Dalton. Due to his success, many pundits and experts have claimed that Whitworth was snubbed out of a second Pro Bowl berth, however, he was named second-team AP NFL All-Pro. He was voted as the 67th best player by his peers in the 2016 list.

Whitworth signed a one-year contract extension with the Bengals on September 26, 2015.

=== Los Angeles Rams ===
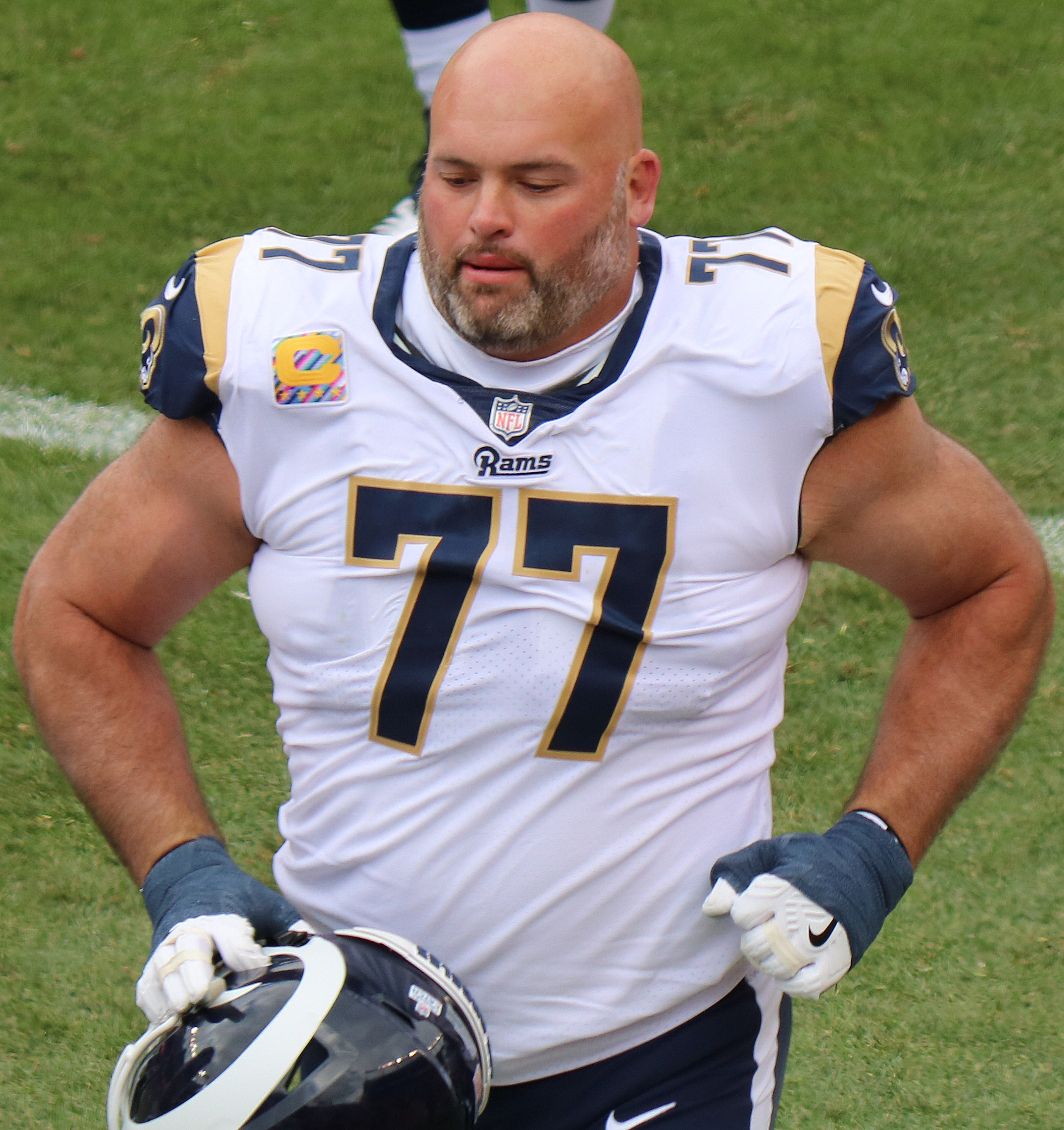
Whitworth with the Rams in 2018

On March 9, 2017, Whitworth signed a three-year contract with the Los Angeles Rams. In his first season with the Rams, Whitworth made it to his fourth Pro Bowl. He was ranked 87th by his peers on the NFL Top 100 Players of 2018.

In 2018, Whitworth helped the Rams reach Super Bowl LIII after they defeated the Dallas Cowboys in the Divisional Round and New Orleans Saints in the NFC Championship Game. The Rams lost to the New England Patriots 13–3 in the Super Bowl.

In the eighth week of the 2019 season, the Rams defeated the Bengals 24–10, giving Whitworth a victory over his former team. With that victory, Whitworth became only the 12th starter in league history to earn victories against all 32 NFL teams.

On April 1, 2020, Whitworth signed a three-year contract with the Rams. On November 16, Whitworth was placed on injured reserve, as he was carted off the field after suffering a torn MCL and damaged PCL in a 23–16 home win over the Seattle Seahawks in Week 10. He was placed on injured reserve the next day. He was activated on January 7, 2021, before the team's playoff game.

Whitworth was named the 2021 Walter Payton NFL Man of the Year at the 11th Annual NFL Honors. Whitworth won his first Super Bowl in what would ultimately be his final game, after the Rams defeated his former team, the Cincinnati Bengals, 23–20 in Super Bowl LVI.

On March 15, 2022, Whitworth announced his retirement after 16 seasons.

== NFL records ==
- Oldest offensive lineman to play in a Super Bowl.
- Oldest offensive lineman to win a Super Bowl.

All took place at age 40.

== Broadcasting career ==
After retiring in 2022, Whitworth joined Amazon's Thursday Night Football crew as an analyst.

== Personal life ==
Whitworth is a Christian. Whitworth said he grew up as a Christian from a young age, but he lived mostly for himself. He said, "I had lots of success as an athlete, but my personal life was a wreck. I was unfaithful to women, my family, and most importantly to God. I thought I was strong and had everything together, but I was only fooling myself. I allowed guilt to control my life and cause me to make huge mistakes." After his second season in the NFL, Whitworth recommitted to his faith after going to church. "I fell to my knees and told God I was tired of running. I was ready to live the way He called me to. … I now live life with a new clear mind, whole heart, and a burning passion to spread Christ's love."

Whitworth and his wife, Melissa, have four children. Melissa was the 2003 Miss Louisiana, is a Louisiana reporter, and won Cincinnati's version of Dancing With the Stars.

Whitworth is active in the community through his BigWhit 77 Foundation. He hosts a fund-raising golf tournament in Louisiana and serves as a motivational speaker to youth groups in both Greater Cincinnati and in Louisiana.

In March 2020, Whitworth donated $250,000 to the Los Angeles Regional Food Bank during the 2020–21 COVID-19 pandemic.
