= Theodore Roosevelt Award =

American collegiate athletics award

- Awarded for: A graduate from an NCAA member institution who earned a varsity letter in college for participation in intercollegiate athletics, and who ultimately became a distinguished citizen of national reputation based on outstanding life accomplishment
- Country: United States
- Presented by: NCAA

History
- First award: 1967
- Most recent: Dikembe Mutombo

The Theodore Roosevelt Award is the highest honor the National Collegiate Athletic Association (NCAA) may confer on an individual. The award is awarded annually to a graduate from an NCAA member institution who earned a varsity letter in college for participation in intercollegiate athletics, and who ultimately became a distinguished citizen of national reputation based on outstanding life accomplishment. Each awardee, by personal example, is said to exemplify the ideals and purposes to which collegiate athletics are dedicated.

The award, nicknamed "The Teddy," is named after U.S. President Theodore Roosevelt, whose concern for the conduct of intercollegiate athletes and athletic programs led to the formation of the NCAA in 1906. Past winners include four former Presidents of the United States: Dwight D. Eisenhower (1967), Gerald R. Ford (1975), George H. W. Bush (1986), and Ronald Reagan (1990).

== Past winners ==
- 1967: Dwight D. Eisenhower, United States Military Academy (football)
- 1968: Leverett Saltonstall, Harvard University (rowing)
- 1969: Byron "Whizzer" White, University of Colorado at Boulder (football, basketball)
- 1970: Frederick L. Hovde, University of Minnesota (football)
- 1971: Christopher C. Kraft, Jr., Virginia Polytechnic Institute and State University (baseball)
- 1972: Jerome H. Holland, Cornell University (football)
- 1973: Omar Bradley, United States Military Academy (baseball)
- 1974: Jesse Owens, Ohio State University (track and field)
- 1975: Gerald Ford, University of Michigan (football)
- 1976: Thomas J. Hamilton, United States Naval Academy (football, basketball, baseball)
- 1977: Tom Bradley, University of California, Los Angeles (track, football)
- 1978: Gerald B. Zornow, University of Rochester (football, basketball, baseball)
- 1979: Otis Chandler, Stanford University (track and field)
- 1980: Denton Cooley, University of Texas at Austin (basketball)
- 1981: Art Linkletter, San Diego State University (basketball, swimming)
- 1982: Bill Cosby, Temple University (football) - Rescinded by the NCAA in 2018 after multiple allegations and convictions of sexual assault.
- 1983: Arnold Palmer, Wake Forest University (golf)
- 1984: William P. Lawrence, United States Naval Academy (basketball, football, tennis)
- 1985: Robben Fleming, Beloit College
- 1986: George H. W. Bush, Yale University (baseball)
- 1987: Walter J. Zable, The College of William & Mary (football)
- 1988: Not presented
- 1989: Paul Ebert, Ohio State University (baseball, basketball)
- 1990: Ronald Reagan, Eureka College (football)
- 1991: Althea Gibson, Florida A&M University (tennis)
- 1992: Jack Kemp, Occidental College (football)
- 1993: Lamar Alexander, Vanderbilt University (track and field)
- 1994: Rafer Johnson, University of California, Los Angeles (track and field)
- 1995: Bob Mathias, Stanford University (track and field)
- 1996: John Wooden, Purdue University (basketball)
- 1997: William Porter Payne, University of Georgia (football)
- 1998: Bob Dole, Washburn University (basketball)
- 1999: Bill Richardson, Tufts University (baseball)
- 2000: Roger Staubach, United States Naval Academy (football)
- 2001: William Cohen, Bowdoin College (basketball)
- 2002: Eunice Kennedy Shriver, Stanford University (swimming, track and field)
- 2003: Donna de Varona, University of California, Los Angeles (swimming)
- 2004: Alan Page, University of Notre Dame (football)
- 2005: Sally Ride, Stanford University (tennis)
- 2006: Robert Kraft, Columbia University (football)
- 2007: Paul Tagliabue, Georgetown University (basketball)
- 2008: John Glenn, Muskingum College
- 2009: Madeleine Albright, Wellesley College (swimming, rowing, and field hockey)
- 2010: George J. Mitchell, Bowdoin College (basketball)
- 2011: Ann E. Dunwoody, SUNY Cortland (gymnastics, tennis)
- 2012: Will Allen, University of Miami (basketball)
- 2013: Tony Dungy, University of Minnesota (football)
- 2014: Billy Mills, Haskell Indian Nations University and University of Kansas (track and field)
- 2015: Mannie Jackson, University of Illinois at Urbana–Champaign (basketball)
- 2016: Peter Ueberroth, San Jose State University (water polo)
- 2017: Beth Brooke-Marciniak, Purdue University (women's basketball)
- 2018: Barry E. Wilmore, Tennessee Technological University (football)
- 2019: Robert L. Caslen, United States Military Academy (football)
- 2020: Bob Delaney, New Jersey City University (basketball)
- 2021: John McLendon, Tennessee State University (basketball)
- 2022: Gail Koziara Boudreaux, Dartmouth College (basketball)
- 2023: Carol L. Shields, University of Notre Dame (basketball)
- 2024: Tom Catena, Brown University (football)
- 2025: Tina Sloan Green, Temple University (lacrosse)
- 2026: Dikembe Mutombo, Georgetown University (basketball)

== See also ==
- Walter Camp Man of the Year
- Walter Camp Distinguished American Award
- Walter Camp Alumni of the Year
- Amos Alonzo Stagg Award
- National Football Foundation Distinguished American Award
- National Football Foundation Gold Medal Winners
- Walter Payton Man of the Year Award
- "Whizzer" White NFL Man of the Year Award
