= Paul Ebert =

American surgeon and athlete (1932–2009)

Paul Ebert

Paul Allen Ebert (August 11, 1932 – April 21, 2009) was an American surgeon and athlete. He had been Chairman of the Departments of Surgery at both Cornell University Medical College and the University of California San Francisco Medical Center, as well as the President of the American College of Cardiology, the American Association for Thoracic Surgery, the Society of University Surgeons, and the Western Thoracic Surgical Association. Before earning his medical degree, he was an All-American in both baseball and basketball at the Ohio State University. He was born in Columbus, Ohio.

== Athlete ==
As a student at Ohio State Ebert was 6'4", 188 lbs. He was a forward and center on the school's basketball team and a pitcher on the baseball team. He was a charter member of the Ohio State Varsity O Hall of Fame, inducted in 1977.

In basketball Ebert was a first-team All-Big Ten selection and voted team MVP every year he played for the Buckeyes, 1951–52, 1952–53, and 1953–54. He finished his collegiate basketball career with the team record in points scored (1,436), surpassed in 1956 by Robin Freeman. Ebert scored 516 points in his senior year, becoming the first Ohio State player to score at least 500 points in a season. That year Ebert served as team captain and was named a third-team All-America selection by the United Press International.

In baseball Ebert had a career 21–8 record as a pitcher. He led his team in both wins and strike outs every year he played. He finished his collegiate career with the Ohio State single-season (94) and career (223) record for strike outs, surpassed in both categories by Steve Arlin in the mid-1960s. Ebert was a consensus first team All America selection as a senior. Ebert was selected to the USA Baseball team that Won Silver at the Pan American Games in Mexico 1955, he went 2–0 and was the pitcher of record with 18 strikeouts.

After college Ebert spent two summers playing semi-pro baseball in Marshall, Minnesota. At the end of the first summer in Marshall he returned to Columbus to be married to Louise Joyce Parks and to begin medical school at Ohio State. Ebert received offers to sign with the New York Giants and Pittsburgh Pirates, but under the bonus baby rules of the time he would have been required to stay with the major league club for two years and could not have attended medical school.

== Career ==
Ebert received his M.D. degree from Ohio State University in 1958. He had internship and residency at Johns Hopkins Hospital under Alfred Blalock, and then spent two years as a Senior Assistant Surgeon at the National Heart Institute, National Institutes of Health, Bethesda, Maryland. He specialized in thoracic and cardiovascular surgery.

Ebert became a professor of surgery at Duke University Medical Center. From 1971 to 1975 he was Chairman of the Department of Surgery at Cornell University Medical College and from 1975 to 1986 he was Chairman of the Department of Surgery at the University of California San Francisco Medical Center. He was a Fellow of the American College of Surgeons since 1968, and assumed the directorship of the college in November 1986.

Ebert was the 1989 recipient of the Theodore Roosevelt Award.

== Personal life ==
Ebert married Louise Joyce Parks and they had three children. Ebert died of an acute myocardial infarction on April 21, 2009.
