= Bill Morton (American football) =

American football player (1909–1987)

Profile
- Position: Quarterback
- Class: 1932

Personal information
- Born: September 17, 1909; New Rochelle, New York, U.S.
- Died: April 11, 1987 (aged 77); Hanover, New Hampshire, U.S.
- Listed height: 5 ft 11 in (1.80 m)
- Listed weight: 178 lb (81 kg)

Career information
- High school: New Rochelle (New York)
- College: Dartmouth (1929–1931)

Awards and highlights
- Second-team All-American (1931); Third-team All-American (1930)
- College Football Hall of Fame (Class of 1972)

William Hanson Morton (September 17, 1909 – April 11, 1987) was an American football player and business executive. He played college football for Dartmouth from 1929 to 1931, and later was an executive with American Express. Morton was elected to the College Football Hall of Fame in 1972.

== Biography ==
Morton attended New Rochelle High School in his hometown in New York state, where he played football, baseball, and ice hockey; he graduated in 1927. One of his teammates was Vincent dePaul Draddy.

Morton attended Dartmouth College in Hanover, New Hampshire, where he played for the Dartmouth Indians football team, as it was then known. He was a member of the varsity team for the 1929–1931 seasons, where he played quarterback and was nicknamed "Air Mail" Morton. The team had an aggregate record of 19–6–2 for those three seasons. He also played on the Dartmouth men's ice hockey team, and earned All-America honors in both sports. He graduated from Dartmouth in 1932.

In October 1940, Morton noted on his draft registration card that he was married and was employed by the Chase National Bank in Chicago. He later founded his own investment firm, W. H. Morton and Company, which was later acquired by American Express, where Morton became president and vice-chairman before retiring in 1974.

Morton was elected to the College Football Hall of Fame in 1972, received an honorary doctorate from Dartmouth in 1982, and was awarded the National Football Foundation Gold Medal in 1986. He was also inducted to the athletic hall of fame at Dartmouth. He died in 1987, aged 77; he was survived by his wife and two children.

Morton was posthumously inducted to the New Rochelle Sports Hall of Fame in 1996.
