= Walter Camp Man of the Year =

US football award

- Awarded for: the "Man of the Year" in the world of college football
- Country: United States
- Presented by: Walter Camp Football Foundation

History
- First award: 1967
- Most recent: Bruce Matthews
- Website: https://waltercamp.org/man-of-the-year/

The Walter Camp Man of the Year is one of seven awards given annually by the Walter Camp Football Foundation. The award is given to the "Man of the Year" in the world of college football. The criteria for the award are stated to include success, leadership, public service, integrity, and commitment to American heritage and Walter Camp's philosophy.

== Yearly honorees ==
1967 — Hamilton Fish, Harvard
1968 — Ted Blair, Yale
1969 — Pete Rozelle, San Francisco
1970 — Harry Kipke, Michigan
1971 — Doc Blanchard, Army
1972 — Clinton Frank, Yale
1973 — Duffy Daugherty, Syracuse/Michigan State
1974 — Jake Gaither, Knoxville College/Florida A&M
1975 — Pete Dawkins, Army
1976 — Edward Krause, Notre Dame
1977 — Frederick Dunlap, Colgate
1978 — Floyd Little, Syracuse
1979 — Jack Kemp, Occidental
1980 — Gale Sayers, Kansas
1981 — Otto Graham, Northwestern
1982 — Merlin Olsen, Utah State
1983 — Roger Staubach, Navy
1984 — Don Shula, John Carroll
1985 — Rocky Bleier, Notre Dame
1986 — Willie Davis, Grambling
1987 — Levi Jackson, Yale
1988 — Andy Robustelli, Arnold
1989 — Paul Brown, Miami (Ohio)
1990 — Nick Buoniconti, Notre Dame
1991 — Mel Blount, Southern
1992 — Bob Griese, Purdue
1993 — Warren Moon, Washington
1994 — Dick Anderson, Colorado
1995 — Reggie Williams, Dartmouth
1996 — Lynn Swann, Southern California
1997 — Calvin Hill, Yale
1998 — Lou Holtz, Kent State University
1999 — Gil Brandt, Dallas Cowboys
2000 — Howie Long, Villanova
2001 — Mike Singletary, Baylor
2002 — Jim Kelly, Miami (Florida)
2003 — Ozzie Newsome, Alabama
2004 — Anthony Muñoz, Southern California
2005 — Dwight Stephenson, Alabama
2006 — Mike Utley, Washington State
2007 — Dick Butkus, Illinois
2008 — Morten Andersen, Michigan State
2009 — John Elway, Stanford
2010 — Will Shields, Nebraska
2011 — Harry Carson, South Carolina State
2012 — Herm Edwards, San Diego State
2013 — Matt Millen, Penn State
2014 — Jerome Bettis, Notre Dame
2015 — Fred Biletnikoff, Florida State and Joe Andruzzi, Southern Connecticut State University
2016 — Warrick Dunn, Florida State
2017 — Calvin Johnson, Georgia Tech
2018 — Mike Golic, Notre Dame
2019 — Curtis Martin, Pitt
2021 — Drew Pearson, Tulsa
2022 — Tony Boselli, Southern California
2023 — Bruce Matthews, Southern California

== See also ==
- Walter Camp Distinguished American Award
- Walter Camp Alumni of the Year
- Amos Alonzo Stagg Award
- National Football Foundation Distinguished American Award
- National Football Foundation Gold Medal Winners
- Theodore Roosevelt Award (NCAA)
- Walter Payton Man of the Year Award
- "Whizzer" White NFL Man of the Year Award
