= Gerald B. Zornow =

American businessman (died 1984)

Gerald B. Zornow (died August 29, 1984) was an American business executive and former president and chairman of the board of Eastman Kodak Company. He was also a professional baseball player and a hall of fame college football player.

== Early life ==
Zorrow attended the University of Rochester, graduating in 1937. While there, he was a member of Alpha Delta Phi and a three-sport letter winner—football, basketball and baseball.

== Career ==
After college, Zornow signed with the St. Louis Cardinals. In 1937, he pitched for the Rochester Red Wings.

Later, he became the vice president of marketing with Eastman Kodak Company. Zornow served as the president of Eastman Kodak Company from 1970 to 1972 and as chairman of the board from 1972 to 1977. In 1975, President Gerald R. Ford created the President's Commission on Olympic Sports and Zornow served as chairman of the commission.

== Awards ==
- 1974:Gold Medal, National Football Foundation
- 1974: College Football Hall of Fame
- 1976: Amos Alonzo Stagg Award, American Football Coaches Association
- 1978: Theodore Roosevelt Award, National Collegiate Athletic Association
- 1992: University of Rochester Athletic Hall of Fame
