= Monk Meyer =

United States Army general (1913–2001)

Charles R. Meyer
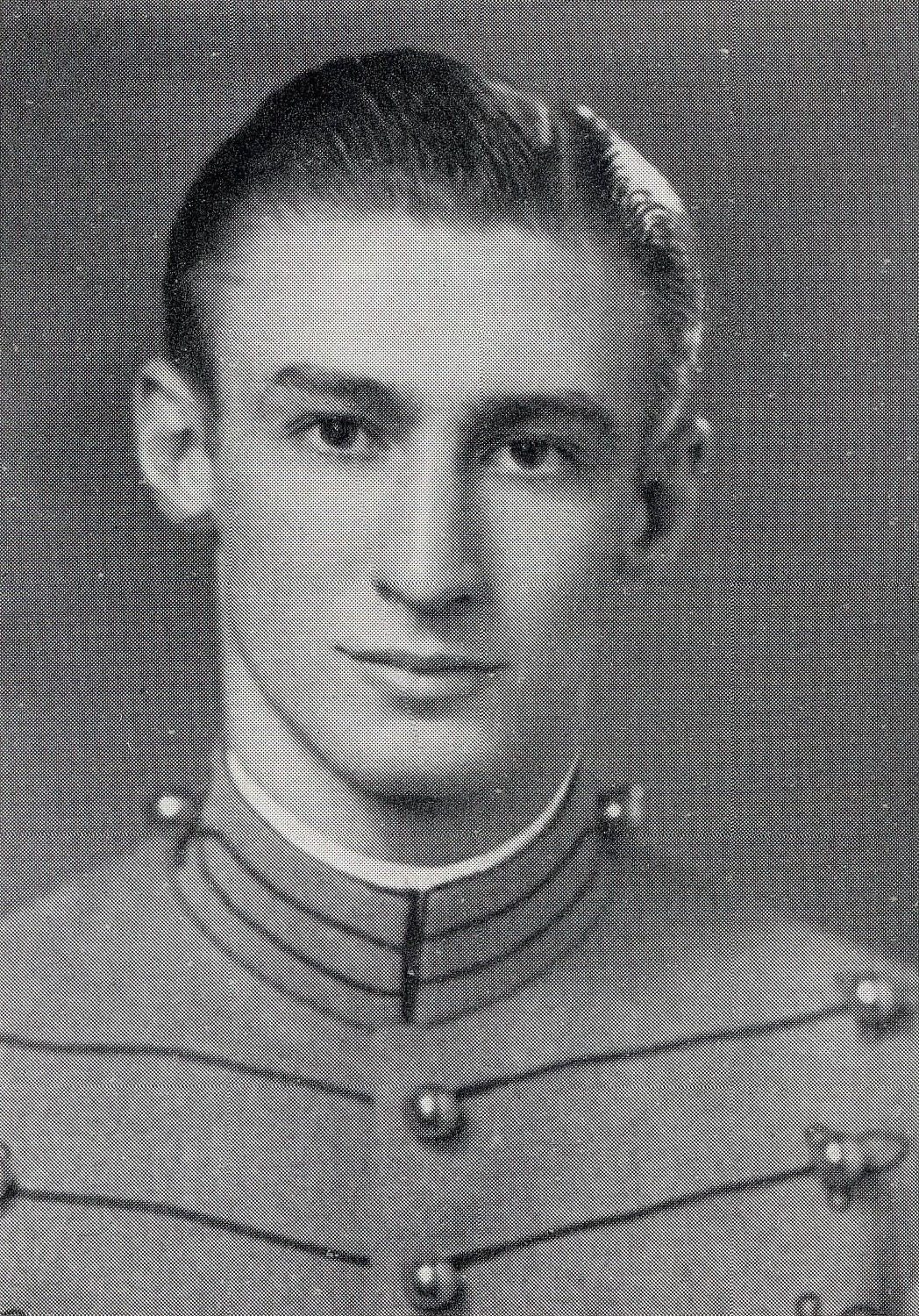
- Meyer as a Cadet in 1937
- Nickname: Monk
- Born: Charles Robert Meyer; May 1, 1913; West Point, New York, U.S.
- Died: August 11, 2001 (aged 88) Hampton, New Hampshire, U.S.
- Buried: West Point Cemetery, New York, U.S.
- Allegiance: United States
- Branch: United States Army
- Service years: 1932–1933, 1937–1967
- Rank: Brigadier General
- Commands: Northern Area Command, West Germany; 160th Infantry Regiment; 2nd Battalion, 127th Infantry
- Conflicts: World War II; Korean War; Vietnam War
- Awards: Distinguished Service Cross; Distinguished Service Medal (2); Silver Star (2); Legion of Merit (2); Bronze Star (2); Purple Heart (2); Air Medal

Charles Robert Meyer (May 1, 1913 – August 11, 2001) was the runner-up for the Heisman Trophy in 1935, the first year the trophy was awarded, while playing for the United States Military Academy.

== Early life and education ==
Meyer was born on May 1, 1913, in West Point, New York, the son of Lieutenant Colonel Hermie Meyer. Meyer grew up at various U.S. Army bases in the U.S. and the Philippines, accompanying his father's post assignments throughout his military career. The Meyer family relocated to the Lehigh Valley area in time for Monk to play football, basketball, and baseball at Allentown High School in Allentown, Pennsylvania.

After graduating from Allentown High School, Meyer attended preparatory school at Chestnut Hill Academy in Philadelphia. He enlisted in the U.S. Army on April 25, 1932, and entered the United States Military Academy the following year, in 1933, where he played football for Army for two seasons (1935 and 1936) as a multifaceted player who could run, pass, kick, and play defense. For two seasons under Army head coach Gar Davidson.

In 1935, against Notre Dame before a capacity crowd of 78,114 in Yankee Stadium, Meyer's 41-yard first quarter touchdown pass and performance in a 6–6 tie first brought him into the national limelight. He was named an All-American and then runner-up to the University of Chicago's Jay Berwanger in the first-ever Heisman Trophy vote that year.

In 1936, Monk had another big day in Yankee Stadium, outdueling famed Columbia passer and future Chicago Bears Hall of Fame quarterback Sid Luckman as Army defeated Columbia 27–16.

== Military career ==
Meyer graduated from West Point in 1937 and the Command and General Staff School in 1944 and led troops in the Pacific Theater under the overall command of GEN Douglas MacArthur during World War II and again in Korea, and was wounded twice. In addition he served in Vietnam and was a Pearl Harbor survivor.

Meyer graduated from the Armed Forces Staff College in 1952 and the Army War College in 1956. After 30 years of military service, he retired on July 31, 1967, as a brigadier general. Meyer died on August 11, 2001, in Hampton, New Hampshire, and was buried at the West Point Cemetery at the United States Military Academy in New York on October 4, 2001.

== Accolades ==
Meyer received the Sports Illustrated Silver Anniversary All-American Award in 1961.

He was inducted into the Lehigh Valley chapter of the National Football Foundation and College Football Hall of Fame in 1983.

Like President Dwight D. Eisenhower and GEN MacArthur before him, the National Football Foundation and College Football Hall of Fame also presented Monk its most prestigious accolade, the Gold Medal Award, in 1987.

During his military career, Meyer was awarded the following valorous medals:

Distinguished Service Cross
Silver Star with oak leaf cluster
Purple Heart with oak leaf cluster
