= National Football Foundation Distinguished American Award =

- Awarded for: Exhibiting superior qualities of scholarship, citizenship, and leadership
- Country: United States
- Presented by: National Football Foundation & College Football Hall of Fame

History
- First award: 1966
- Most recent: William H. McRaven

The National Football Foundation Distinguished American Award is among the highest offered by the National Football Foundation (NFF). Every year, the NFF & College Football Hall of Fame pays tribute to a select few with awards of excellence for exhibiting superior qualities of scholarship, citizenship and leadership. Additionally, the Foundation also recognizes individuals who demonstrate outstanding support for the NFF and its mission of promoting the game of amateur football. The Distinguished American Award is presented on special occasions when a truly deserving individual emerges, the award honors someone who has applied the character building attributes learned from amateur sport in their business and personal life, exhibiting superior leadership qualities in education, amateur athletics, business and in the community.

The recipient is not limited to a former college player or coach, must be an outstanding person who has maintained a lifetime of interest in the game and who, over a long period of time, has exhibited enviable leadership qualities and made a significant contribution to the betterment of amateur football in the United States.

== Selection process ==
Various individuals associated with The National Football Foundation, such as former recipients, board members corporate leaders, chapter presidents and friends send nominations and suggestions to the NFF Chairman. Selection of the recipient is made by the Awards Committee and ratified by the Board of Directors.

== Recipients ==
1966 - Bill Carpenter
1969 - Archibald MacLeish
1970 - Vince Lombardi
1971 - Frank Boyden
1972 - Jerome H. Holland
1973 - (no award)
1974 - Bob Hope
1975 - Theodore Hesburgh
1976 - James Van Fleet
1977 - Rev. Edmund P. Joyce
1978 - (no award)
1979 - John W. Galbreath
1980 - Fred Russell
1981 - Sonny Werblin
1982 - Silver Anniversary (all honored) Jim Brown, Willie Davis, Jack Kemp, Ron Kramer, Jim Swink
1983 - Leon Hess & James Stewart
1984 - David M. Nelson
1985 - William J. Flynn
1986 - John Toner
1987 - Ike Sewell
1988 - Joe M. Rodgers
1989 - Moose Krause
1990 - Pete Rozelle
1991 - Joe Paterno
1992 - Wellington Mara

1993 - Dick Kazmaier
1994 - Charles F. Bolden, Jr.
1995 - Tom Osborne
1996 - J. Donald Monan, S.J
1997 - (no award)
1998 - Roy Kramer
1999 - (no award)
2000 - Arthur J. Decio
2001 - Dr. James Frank
2002 - George B. Young
2003 - Robert Khayat
2004 - Robert Casciola
2005 - Alan Page
2006 - Pat Tillman
2007 - Rocky Bleier
2008 - T. Boone Pickens
2009 - Billy Payne
2010 - Tom Brokaw
2011 - Archie Roberts
2012 - George Bodenheimer
2013 - Gen. Ray Odierno
2014 - (no award)
2015 - Rear Adm. Bill Byrne, USN
(2015) - Capt. Jared Tew, USAF
(2015) - Maj. Graham White, USA
2016 - Adm. William McRaven

== See also ==
- Walter Camp Man of the Year
- Walter Camp Distinguished American Award
- Walter Camp Alumni of the Year
- Amos Alonzo Stagg Award
- National Football Foundation Distinguished American Award
- National Football Foundation Gold Medal Winners
- Theodore Roosevelt Award (NCAA)
- Walter Payton Man of the Year Award
- "Whizzer" White NFL Man of the Year Award
