= Walter Camp Alumni of the Year =

Walter Camp “Alumni of the Year” award
- Awarded for: a worthy individual who has distinguished himself in the pursuit of excellence as an athlete, in his personal career and in doing good works for others
- Country: United States
- Presented by: Walter Camp Football Foundation

History
- First award: 1986
- Most recent: Jake Matthews

The Walter Camp “Alumni of the Year” award is bestowed by the Walter Camp Football Foundation on a worthy individual who has distinguished himself in the pursuit of excellence as an athlete, in his personal career and in doing good works for others. He must be an individual who has exhibited dedication and good moral conduct in achieving success. He must be a compassionate and unselfish person who contributes his time and assistance in helping to encourage and comfort fellow human beings less talented and less fortunate than himself. He must be an individual who takes pride in having been a Walter Camp All-American.

== Honorees ==
1987 - Mike Reid, Penn State
1988 - Alan Page, Notre Dame
1989 - Dr. Tommy Casanova, Louisiana State
1990 - Tom Jackson, Louisville
1991 - Steve Owens, Oklahoma
1992 - Kellen Winslow, Missouri
1993 - Archie Griffin, Ohio State
1994 - Ed Marinaro, Cornell
1995 - Jim Covert, Pittsburgh
1996 - Lee Roy Selmon, Oklahoma
1997 - Jim Plunkett, Stanford
1998 - Tony Dorsett, Pittsburgh
1999 - Bo Jackson, Auburn
2000 - Don McPherson, Syracuse
2001 - Herschel Walker, Georgia
2002 - Dave Casper, Notre Dame
2003 - Mark May, Pittsburgh
2004 - George Rogers, South Carolina
2005 - Cornelius Bennett, Alabama
2006 - Mike Rozier, Nebraska
2007 - Ray Guy, Southern Mississippi
2008 - Tim Brown, Notre Dame
2009 - David Fulcher, Arizona State
2010 - Tedy Bruschi, Arizona
2011 - Chris Spielman, Ohio State
2012 - Derrick Brooks, Florida State
2013 - Ken Huff, North Carolina
2014 – Chad Hennings, U.S. Air Force Academy
2015 – Doug Williams, Grambling State
2016 – Orlando Pace, Ohio State
2017 – Eddie George, Ohio State
2018 – Larry Fitzgerald, Pittsburgh
2019 – Von Miller, Texas A&M
2021 – Danny Wuerffel, Florida
2021 – Desmond Howard, Michigan
2022 – Ty Law, Michigan
2023 – Jake Matthews, Texas A&M

== See also ==
- Walter Camp Man of the Year
- Walter Camp Distinguished American Award
- Amos Alonzo Stagg Award
- National Football Foundation Distinguished American Award
- National Football Foundation Gold Medal Winners
- Theodore Roosevelt Award (NCAA)
- Walter Payton Man of the Year Award
- "Whizzer" White NFL Man of the Year Award
