= Walter Camp Football Foundation =

American college sports organization

- Abbreviation: WCFF
- Founded: 1967; 59 years ago
- Type: Nonprofit
- Headquarters: New Haven, Connecticut
- Region served: United States
- President: John Barbarotta
- President-elect: Michael Madera
- Website: waltercamp.org

The Walter Camp Football Foundation (WCFF) is one of the organizations whose College Football All-America Team is recognized by the National Collegiate Athletic Association. The organization also presents various awards. It is named in honor of football pioneer Walter Camp.

== History ==
Walter Camp, known as "The Father of American football", first chose an All-America team in 1889. It is rumored that Camp selected the first several All-America teams by himself.

The Walter Camp Football Foundation (WCFF) was formed in 1967 to continue Camp's legacy of selecting All-America teams and to perpetuate the ideals and work of Camp on and off the field. In 1998, the WCFF began naming an All-America second team.

The "Walter Camp Weekend" is held each January in New Haven, Connecticut, featuring a series of events designed to highlight current and former players and engage them with the local community. The weekend's signature event, the National Awards Dinner, recognizes the Walter Camp All-America team, as well as the Player of the Year, the Coach of the Year, and other honorees.

== Awards ==
- Walter Camp Player of the Year
- CT Player of the Year
- Walter Camp Coach of the Year
- Walter Camp Man of the Year
- Walter Camp Alumni of the Year
- Walter Camp Distinguished American Award
- Joseph W. Kelly Award (high school)

== All-Time Team ==
To celebrate the 150th anniversary of college football, the Walter Camp Football Foundation recognized its All-Time All-Americans by position.

=== Offense ===
==== Quarterbacks ====
Doug Flutie, Boston College
Tommie Frazier, Nebraska
Matt Leinart, USC
Johnny Lujack, Notre Dame
Colt McCoy, Texas
Davey O'Brien, TCU
Peyton Manning, Tennessee
Roger Staubach, Navy
Tim Tebow, Florida

==== Running backs ====
Doc Blanchard, Army
Jim Brown, Syracuse
Reggie Bush, USC
Earl Campbell, Texas
Glenn Davis, Army
Ron Dayne, Wisconsin
Tony Dorsett, Pittsburgh
Marshall Faulk, San Diego State
Red Grange, Illinois
Archie Griffin, Ohio State
Bo Jackson, Auburn
Darren McFadden, Arkansas
Adrian Peterson, Oklahoma
Barry Sanders, Oklahoma State
Doak Walker, SMU
Herschel Walker, Georgia
Ricky Williams, Texas

==== Wide receivers ====
Fred Biletnikoff, Florida State
Justin Blackmon, Oklahoma State
Tim Brown, Notre Dame
Anthony Carter, Michigan
Michael Crabtree, Texas Tech
Amari Cooper, Alabama
Larry Fitzgerald, Pittsburgh
Desmond Howard, Michigan
Don Hutson, Alabama
Raghib Ismail, Notre Dame
Dwayne Jarrett, USC
Larry Kelley, Yale
Randy Moss, Marshall
Bennie Oosterbaan, Michigan
Johnny Rodgers, Nebraska
Howard Twilley, Tulsa
Peter Warrick, Florida State

==== Tight ends ====
Mike Ditka, Pittsburgh
Keith Jackson, Oklahoma
Ozzie Newsome, Alabama

==== Offensive line ====
Tony Boselli, USC
Brad Budde, USC
Dan Dierdorf, Michigan
Bill Fralic, Pitt
Bob Gain, Kentucky
John Hannah, Alabama
Jeff Hartings, Penn State
Mel Hein, Washington State
John Hicks, Ohio State
Jake Long, Michigan
Bryant McKinnie, Miami
Jonathan Ogden, UCLA
Orlando Pace, Ohio State
Jim Parker, Ohio State
Dave Rimington, Nebraska
Jim Ritcher, North Carolina State
Will Shields, Nebraska
Greg Skrepenak, Michigan
Dean Steinkuhler, Nebraska
Korey Stringer, Ohio State
Aaron Taylor, Nebraska
Ron Yary, USC

=== Defense ===
==== Defensive line ====
Joey Bosa, Ohio State
Alex Brown, Florida
Ross Browner, Notre Dame
Steve Emtman, Washington
Myles Garrett, Texas A&M
Hugh Green, Pittsburgh
Tommie Harris, Oklahoma
Leon Hart, Notre Dame
Jerry Hughes, TCU
Bruiser Kinard, Mississippi
Bob Lilly, TCU
Merlin Olsen, Utah State
Mike Reid, Penn State
Bubba Smith, Michigan State
Lee Roy Selmon, Oklahoma
Randy White, Maryland
Reggie White, Tennessee
Chris Zorich, Notre Dame

==== Linebackers ====
Dick Butkus, Illinois
Chuck Bednarik, Pennsylvania
Cornelius Bennett, Alabama
Brian Bosworth, Oklahoma
Derrick Brooks, Florida State
Pat Fitzgerald, Northwestern
A.J. Hawk, Ohio State
Marvin Jones, Florida State
Lee Roy Jordan, Alabama
Luke Kuechly, Boston College
James Laurinaitis, Ohio State
Tommy Nobis, Texas
Jerry Robinson, UCLA
Mike Singletary, Baylor
Chris Spielman, Ohio State
Manti Te'o, Notre Dame
Derrick Thomas, Alabama
Patrick Willis, Mississippi

==== Defensive backs ====
Champ Bailey, Georgia
Eric Berry, Tennessee
Dré Bly, North Carolina
Tommy Casanova, LSU
Mike Doss, Ohio State
Kenny Easley, UCLA
Terry Hoage, Georgia
Nile Kinnick, Iowa
Johnny Lattner, Notre Dame
Ronnie Lott, USC
Tim McDonald, USC
Deion Sanders, Florida State
Jack Tatum, Ohio State
Jim Thorpe, Carlisle
Charles Woodson, Michigan

=== Special teams ===
==== Punters ====
Ray Guy, Southern Miss
Brad Maynard, Ball State
Reggie Roby, Iowa
Todd Sauerbrun, West Virginia

==== Placekickers ====
Roberto Aguayo, Florida State
Morten Andersen, Michigan State
Kevin Butler, Georgia
Daniel Carlson, Auburn
Sebastian Janikowski, Florida State
John Lee, UCLA

==== Kick returners ====
Devin Hester, Miami
Tyler Lockett, Kansas State
C.J. Spiller, Clemson

== All-Century Team ==
The Walter Camp Football Foundation selected their All-Century Team in 1999.

=== Offense ===
==== Quarterback ====
Roger Staubach, Navy
Tommie Frazier, Nebraska
Johnny Lujack, Notre Dame
Doug Flutie, Boston College
Davey O'Brien, TCU
Peyton Manning, Tennessee

==== Running back ====
Red Grange, Illinois
Barry Sanders, Oklahoma State
Ricky Williams, Texas
Doak Walker, SMU
O.J. Simpson, USC
Tony Dorsett, Pittsburgh
Bo Jackson, Auburn
Archie Griffin, Ohio State
Herschel Walker, Georgia
Glenn Davis, Army
Doc Blanchard, Army
Jim Brown, Syracuse

==== Receiver ====
Johnny Rodgers, Nebraska
Fred Biletnikoff, Florida State
Tim Brown, Notre Dame
Bennie Oosterbaan, Michigan
Larry Kelley, Yale
Raghib Ismail, Notre Dame
Don Hutson, Alabama
Howard Twilley, Tulsa
Keith Jackson, Oklahoma

==== Tackle ====
Ron Yary, USC
Bill Fralic, Pittsburgh
John Hicks, Ohio State
Orlando Pace, Ohio State
Bob Gain, Kentucky
Dan Dierdorf, Michigan

==== Guard ====
John Hannah, Alabama
Aaron Taylor, Nebraska
Brad Budde, USC
Dean Steinkuhler, Nebraska
Will Shields, Nebraska
Jim Parker, Ohio State

==== Center ====
Dave Rimington, Nebraska
Jim Ritcher, North Carolina State
Mel Hein, Washington State

=== Defense ===
==== Defensive line ====
Hugh Green, Pittsburgh
Bubba Smith, Michigan State
Lee Roy Selmon, Oklahoma
Leon Hart, Notre Dame
Merlin Olsen, Utah State
Bob Lilly, TCU
Ross Browner, Notre Dame
Chris Zorich, Notre Dame
Mike Reid, Penn State
Steve Emtman, Washington
Bruiser Kinard, Mississippi
Randy White, Maryland

==== Linebacker ====
Dick Butkus, Illinois
Chuck Bednarik, Penn
Lee Roy Jordan, Alabama
Tommy Nobis, Texas
Cornelius Bennett, Alabama
Jerry Robinson, UCLA
Chris Spielman, Ohio State
Brian Bosworth, Oklahoma
Mike Singletary, Baylor

==== Cornerback ====
Deion Sanders, Florida State
Nile Kinnick, Iowa
Johnny Lattner, Notre Dame
Jim Thorpe, Carlisle
Charles Woodson, Michigan
Dré Bly, North Carolina

==== Safety ====
Ronnie Lott, USC
Terry Hoage, Georgia
Tommy Casanova, LSU
Kenny Easley, UCLA
Jack Tatum, Ohio State
Tim McDonald, USC

=== Special teams ===
==== Placekicker ====
Morten Andersen, Michigan State
John Lee, UCLA
Sebastian Janikowski, Florida State
Kevin Butler, Georgia

==== Punter ====
Ray Guy, Southern Miss
Reggie Roby, Iowa
Todd Sauerbrun, West Virginia

== See also ==
- All-America
- All-America college football team
- Walter Camp: Father of American football
