= Brian Hainline =

American medical researcher and chief medical officer of the NCAA

- Born: December 23, 1955
- Occupation: Chief medical officer (2013–)
- Employer: National Collegiate Athletic Association

Brian Hainline (born 1955) is an American medical researcher and the chief medical officer of the National Collegiate Athletic Association in the United States. Prior to taking that position in 2013, he was the chief medical officer of the United States Tennis Association. He was born in Santa Monica, California and currently resides in Indiana. He is now the president of the United States Tennis Association.
