= Walter Camp Distinguished American Award =

- Awarded for: An individual who has used his or her talents to attain great success in business, private life or public service and who may have accomplished that which no other has done
- Country: United States
- Presented by: Walter Camp Football Foundation
- First award: 1978
- Currently held by: Steve Spurrier
- Website: Website

The Walter Camp Distinguished American Award is presented by the Walter Camp Football Foundation to an individual who has used his or her talents to attain great success in business, private life or public service and who may have accomplished that which no other has done.

The recipient does not have to have participated in football, but must understand its lesson of self-denial, cooperation and teamwork and be a person of honesty, integrity and dedication. He or she must be a leader, an innovator, even a pioneer, who has reached a degree of excellence which distinguishes them from contemporaries and who lives within the principles of Walter Camp.

== Honorees ==
1978—Jim Crowley, Notre Dame
1979—Sonny Werblin, Rutgers
1980—George Halas, Illinois
1980—Alexander Haig, United States Military Academy
1981—Red Grange, Illinois
1982—Eddie Robinson, Grambling State
1983—Tom Harmon, Michigan
1984—Bill Carpenter, United States Military Academy
1985—Bob Hope
1986—Tom Landry, Texas
1987—Weeb Ewbank, Miami (OH)
1988—Sid Luckman, Columbia / Y. A. Tittle, Louisiana State
1989—Dick Kazmaier, Princeton / Burt Reynolds, Florida State
1990—Tex Schramm, Texas
1991—Alex Kroll, Rutgers / Susan Saint James, Connecticut College
1992—Carmen Cozza, Miami (OH) / Yale
1993—Theodore Hesburgh
1994—Paul Tagliabue, Georgetown
1995—Keith Jackson, Washington State
1996—Dick Ebersol, Yale
1997—Steve Largent, Tulsa
1998—Steve Young, Brigham Young
1999—Bo Schembechler, Miami (OH)
2000—Gene Upshaw, Texas A&I
2001—New York City Police, Fire, and Emergency Medical Service Personnel and Port Authority Police
2002—Regis Philbin, Notre Dame
2003—Bill Walsh, San Jose State
2004—Pat Summerall, Arkansas
2005—Arthur Blank, Babson
2006—Dick Vermeil, San Jose State
2007—Frank Broyles, Georgia Tech
2008—Len Dawson, Purdue
2009—Robin Roberts, Southeastern Louisiana
2010—Chuck Bednarik, Pennsylvania
2011—Floyd Little, Syracuse
2012—Tom Osborne, Hastings
2013—Joe Theismann, Notre Dame
2014—Verne Lundquist, Texas Lutheran
2015—Timothy Shriver, Yale
2016—Mike Ditka, Pitt
2017—Lee Corso, Florida State
2018—Archie Manning, Ole Miss
2019—Chris Berman, Brown
2021—Jerry Jones, Dallas Cowboys
2022—Tom Coughlin, New York Giants
2023—Steve Spurrier, Florida

== See also ==
- Walter Camp Man of the Year
- Walter Camp Alumni of the Year
- Amos Alonzo Stagg Award
- National Football Foundation Distinguished American Award
- National Football Foundation Gold Medal Winners
- Theodore Roosevelt Award (NCAA)
- Walter Payton Man of the Year Award
- "Whizzer" White NFL Man of the Year Award
