= Reggie Williams (linebacker) =

American football player (born 1954)

No. 57
- Position: Linebacker

Personal information
- Born: September 19, 1954 (age 72); Flint, Michigan, U.S.
- Listed height: 6 ft 1 in (1.85 m)
- Listed weight: 228 lb (103 kg)

Career information
- High school: Flint Southwestern
- College: Dartmouth (1973–1975)
- NFL draft: 1976: 3rd round, 82nd overall pick

Career history
- Cincinnati Bengals (1976–1989)

Awards and highlights
- NFL Man of the Year (1986); "Whizzer" White NFL Man of the Year (1985); PFWA NFL All-Rookie Team (1976); Cincinnati Bengals 40th Anniversary Team; Cincinnati Bengals 50th Anniversary Team; SI Sportsperson of the Year (1987); First-team All-American (1975); 2× First-team All-East (1974, 1975); 3× First-team All-Ivy League (1973–1975)

Career NFL statistics
- Sacks: 63.5
- Safeties: 2
- Interceptions: 16
- Interception yards: 194
- Fumble recoveries: 23
- Total touchdowns: 3
- Stats at Pro Football Reference
- College Football Hall of Fame

Reginald Williams (born September 19, 1954) is an American former professional football player who was a linebacker for the Cincinnati Bengals of the National Football League (NFL). He played college football for the Dartmouth Big Green. He is a member of the Greater Flint Area Sports Hall of Fame, the Greater Flint Afro-American Hall of Fame, and the College Football Hall of Fame. Williams served three years on the Cincinnati City Council.

== Early life ==
Williams was born on September 19, 1954, in Flint, Michigan. The son of Elijah and Julia Williams, he overcame a hearing disability as a child. Williams was a star athlete and student at Flint Southwestern High School. He played competitive football and also wrestled. As a junior, he played linebacker, but switched to fullback his senior year.

The recipient of an academic scholarship, Williams was a three-time All-Ivy League linebacker in football and Ivy League heavyweight wrestling champion in 1975 at Dartmouth College, graduating in 1976 with an A.B. in psychology. He also took courses there in tai chi and ballet.

== Professional career ==
In 1976, Williams was selected in the third round by the Cincinnati Bengals, for whom he played 14 seasons, (including two Super Bowls, XVI (1981) and XXIII (1988)).

Williams recorded 16 interceptions and 23 fumble recoveries, still a franchise record. During his career Williams amassed 62.5 sacks, the second most in the team's history. In his final two seasons with Cincinnati, he was appointed to an open seat on the Cincinnati City Council in 1988 and was elected for a second term in 1989 on the Charter Party ticket.

Williams has received numerous honors, including selection to the NFL All-Rookie Team (1976), the Byron "Whizzer" White Award for Humanitarian Service (1985), and the NFL Walter Payton Man of the Year Award (1986). He was also named Co-Sportsman of the Year in 1987 by Sports Illustrated.

== Post-NFL life ==
After retiring from the NFL, Williams joined the World League of American Football as the Vice President/General Manager of the New York/New Jersey Knights. He later rejoined the NFL, where he conceived and opened the NFL's first Youth Education Town (YET) in Los Angeles.

Williams was hired as director of sports development for Disney on April 19, 1993. In the mid-1990s, he oversaw the creation of Disney's Wide World of Sports Complex, a state-of-the-art 220-acre (0.89 km^{2}) multi-sport facility that opened on March 28, 1997, and hosts more than 180 athletic events annually in some 30 sports. By 1998, he had become Vice President of Disney Sports Attractions, where he oversaw a newly created sports and recreation division that merged Walt Disney World Resort Recreation, Water Parks, and Disney Sports Attractions. The latter included Disney's Wide World of Sports Complex, the Walt Disney World Speedway, and Walt Disney World Golf. Williams retired from Disney in November 2007, stepping down to focus on rehabilitating his legs from damage sustained during his playing NFL career.

Although he was a starter for 14 seasons, Williams played most of his career on a bad right knee. He has had 24 knee surgeries since his career ended. He had the first surgery in 1979, plus knee replacements as well as multiple infections. In 2008, when he was diagnosed with the bone infection osteomylitis, he had eight surgeries in five months. His right leg is now 2 5/8 inches shorter than his left one, and he has struggled to avoid having it amputated. Williams uses cannabis to treat the pain and inflammation present in his knee, which he says has allowed him to walk without crutches again.

In December 2007 Williams was elected to the College Football Hall of Fame. He received an honorary Doctor of Laws from Dartmouth College in 1990 and is a member of Alpha Phi Alpha fraternity. Williams now lives in Orlando Florida.

Reggie is the author of the book Resilient by Nature, released in September 2020 and published by Post Hill Press.
