= Walter J. Zable =

American businessman and entrepreneur (1915–2012)

- Photo courtesy of Cubic Corporation
- Born: June 17, 1915; Los Angeles, California, U.S.
- Died: June 23, 2012 (aged 97); San Diego, California, U.S.
- Education: College of William & Mary (B.S); University of Florida (M.S.)
- Occupations: Founder, chairman and CEO of Cubic Corporation
- Years active: 1951–2012
- Known for: World's oldest public company CEO at time of death; All-American college football player; semi-professional football player for the Richmond Arrows
- Board member of: University of San Diego
- Spouse(s): Betty Virginia Carter Zable (1942–2007)
- Children: 2
- Website: Cubic Corporation bio

Walter Joseph Zable (June 17, 1915 – June 23, 2012) was an American businessman, entrepreneur, semi-professional football player and college athlete. He was the founder, chairman and chief executive officer (CEO) of Cubic Corporation, a public corporation providing military defense equipment and automated fare collection equipment. At the time of Zable's death, he was the world's oldest public company CEO and Cubic was worth 1.28 billion dollars. Earlier in his life he had played semi-professional football for the Richmond Arrows in the Dixie League. Some sources also mention him as having played for the National Football League's New York Giants, although no official Giants records exist of his having played for the team.

== Early life and college ==
Walter J. Zable was born in Los Angeles, California. He grew up in Boston, Massachusetts during the Great Depression while his father worked in a mill. Before Zable reached high school he had taken an interest in electronics. During the day he worked on his athletic ability—specifically his football, baseball and track and field prowess—and at night he was enrolled in Boston Trade School where he took classes at Massachusetts Institute of Technology and Wentworth Institute of Technology. Years later Zable recounted that "electronics and athletics were [his] life." He graduated from high school in 1933.

Zable earned a full athletic scholarship to the College of William & Mary in Williamsburg, Virginia. He chose William & Mary over Harvard University which was much closer to home and also offered him an academic scholarship. Zable suited up for the Indians football team from 1934 through 1936. He enjoyed success on the gridiron and earned honorable mention All-America accolades his senior year. In addition to football, Zable also lettered in baseball, basketball, and track and field.

== Post college ==
=== Football and business careers ===
After graduating college in 1937 with a Bachelor of Science degree in physics, Zable played semi-professional football. He played for the Richmond Arrows in the short-lived Dixie League. After a year of playing football, he enrolled in the University of Florida Graduate School and earned his Master of Science degree in physics in 1939. Zable then moved on to business. Prior to starting Cubic Corporation in 1951, Zable worked for Sperry Gyroscope Company, Federal Telecommunications Laboratories of ITT, Flight Research Company, and Newport News Shipbuilding and Dry Dock Company. Along the way he married his wife, Betty Virginia (Carter) Zable, and then they moved to southern California. He began Cubic Corporation in 1951 to launch his first product, a device used to measure and test microwave output. Over the next six decades, Zable expanded Cubic Corporation into a billion dollar-plus engineering giant that employs approximately 8,000 people worldwide.

=== Philanthropy ===
Walter J. Zable and his late wife, Betty Virginia Zable, were philanthropists. In 1990, for instance, they donated $10 million to their alma mater, the College of William & Mary, and in return the college named their football stadium after him. Back in 1971, he "established the Walter J. Zable/San Diego Chapter of the National Football Foundation and College Hall of Fame (NFFCHF) to help preserve the genuine sportsmanship and integrity exhibited in high school and college football," according to an official San Diego City Council proclamation in honor of his 90th birthday. Players such as Junior Seau and Mark Malone benefited directly from this NFF chapter. Recognizing his contribution to both athletics and his fellow man, the National Collegiate Athletic Association (NCAA) bestowed him with the Theodore Roosevelt Award in 1987, which is the highest honor the NCAA confers. Past winners include George H. W. Bush, John Wooden, and Bob Dole.

=== Death ===
On June 23, 2012, Zable died at age 97 from natural causes. At the time of his death he was survived by his son Walter C. Zable, daughter Karen (Zable) Cox and 5 grandchildren. He was the world's oldest public company CEO and Cubic was worth 1.28 billion dollars.

== Awards and honors ==
- Sports Illustrated Silver Anniversary All-American Football Team (1962)
- William & Mary Sports Hall of Fame (1969)
- San Diego Chapter of the National Football Foundation Distinguished American Award (1979)
- Theodore Roosevelt Award (1987)
- Honored with a "Walter J. Zable Day" in San Diego in June 2005
- Ernst & Young's "Entrepreneur of the Year" (2006)
- In 2007, Zable was inducted into the International Air & Space Hall of Fame at the San Diego Air & Space Museum.
