= Vincent dePaul Draddy =

American entrepreneur and college sports figure

- Draddy in 1981
- Born: January 31, 1907; New York, New York, U.S.
- Died: July 8, 1990 (aged 83); Port Chester, New York, U.S.
- Education: Manhattan College
- Occupation: Sportswear entrepreneur
- Known for: Chairman of the College Football Hall of Fame
- Spouses: Ruth Crystal (m. 1932; died 1974): Maria Gamio

Vincent dePaul Draddy (January 31, 1907 – July 8, 1990) was an American entrepreneur and scholar-athlete at Manhattan College, who later served as chairman of the College Football Hall of Fame.

== Biography ==
Draddy attended New Rochelle High School in New York state, where he played sports and was a teammate of Bill Morton.

While at Manhattan College, Draddy played football, basketball, and golf. He was captain of the Manhattan Jaspers football team in 1929. He was a 1930 graduate of the college, and was inducted to its athletic hall of fame in 1979. Draddy Gymnasium on the college's campus is named in honor of his late wife and their first son, Vincent Jr., who was killed in an automobile accident in 1953.

Draddy worked for 40 years for David Crystal, Inc., of Manhattan's Seventh Avenue, having married the daughter of the eponymous founder of that firm in 1932. He ultimately became chairman of the company, and helped to popularize both the Izod and Lacoste brands.

Draddy served the National Football Foundation (NFF) and its College Football Hall of Fame for 33 years, including 19 years as the chairman of its board of directors. The Vincent dePaul Draddy Trophy, now known as the William V. Campbell Trophy, is awarded annually by the NFF and is given to the American college football player with the best combination of academics, community service, and on-field performance.

Draddy died in Port Chester, New York, in 1990 from pulmonary fibrosis, aged 83. He was posthumously inducted to the New Rochelle Sports Hall of Fame in 1993.
