= National Football Foundation Gold Medal winners =

US football award winners

National Football Foundation Gold Medal
- Awarded for: exhibiting superior qualities of scholarship, citizenship and leadership.
- Country: United States
- Presented by: National Football Foundation & College Football Hall of Fame

History
- First award: 1958
- Most recent: Mark Harmon
- Website: Website

Each football season, the National Football Foundation and the College Football Hall of Fame pay tribute to a select few with awards of excellence for exhibiting superior qualities of scholarship, citizenship and leadership. The Foundation also recognizes individuals who demonstrate outstanding support for the NFF and its mission of promoting the game of amateur football. The NFF Gold Medal is the highest award offered by the NFF.

== Gold Medal qualifications ==
Recipient’s life must reflect the values of those who have excelled in amateur sport, particularly football. Recipients must have achieved success in an industrial, business, financial, educational, professional or related career and American citizen, most of whose business life has been spent in the United States. Moreover, they must have an unblemished reputation for honesty and integrity.

Additionally, the recipient must have "contributed notably in public service to the welfare of his country and fellow citizens," either as a private citizen or as a government official or both. and have shown a capacity for dedicated institutional commitment to the problem of our competitive economy versus a centrally dictated society and a concern for the human spirit as well as the mind. Recipient may be an elected or appointed federal or state government official, or a member of Congress or any state legislative body, however, they shall not be selected because of political power or on a partisan basis.

== Selection process ==
Various individuals associated with the National Football Foundation, such as former recipients, board members, corporate leaders, chapter presidents and friends, send nominations and suggestions to the NFF chairman. Selection of the recipient is made by the awards committee and ratified by the board of directors.

1958 – Dwight D. Eisenhower
1959 – Douglas MacArthur
1960 – Herbert C. Hoover and Amos Alonzo Stagg
1961 – John F. Kennedy
1962 – Byron "Whizzer" White
1963 – Roger Blough
1964 – Donold B. Lourie
1965 – Juan Trippe
1966 – Earl Blaik
1967 – Frederick L. Hovde
1968 – Chester J. LaRoche
1969 – Richard M. Nixon
1970 – Thomas J. Hamilton
1971 – Ronald W. Reagan
1972 – Gerald R. Ford
1973 – John Wayne
1974 – Gerald B. Zornow
1975 – David Packard
1976 – Edgar B. Speer
1977 – Louis H. Wilson Jr.
1978 – Vincent dePaul Draddy
1979 – William P. Lawrence
1980 – Walter J. Zable
1981 – Justin Whitlock Dart Sr.
1982 – Silver Anniversary Awards (NCAA) – All Honored Jim Brown, Willie Davis, Jack Kemp, Ron Kramer, Jim Swink
1983 – Jack Kemp
1984 – John McGillicuddy
1985 – William I. Spencer
1986 – William H. Morton
1987 – Charles R. Meyer
1988 – Clinton E. Frank
1989 – Paul Brown
1990 – Thomas H. Moorer
1991 – George H. W. Bush
1992 – Donald R. Keough
1993 – Norman Schwarzkopf
1994 – Thomas S. Murphy
1995 – Harold Alfond
1996 – Gene Corrigan
1997 – Jackie Robinson
1998 – John H. McConnell
1999 – Keith Jackson
2000 – Fred M. Kirby II
2001 – Billy Joe "Red" McCombs
2002 – George M. Steinbrenner III
2003 – General Tommy Franks (Ret.)
2004 – William V. Campbell
2005 – Jon F. Hanson
2006 – Joe Paterno and Bobby Bowden
2007 – Pete Dawkins and Roger Staubach
2008 – John Glenn
2009 – Phil Knight and Bill Bowerman
2010 – Bill Cosby
2011 – Robert Gates
2012 – Roscoe Brown
2013 – National Football League and Roger Goodell
2014 - Tom Catena and George Weiss
2015 – Condoleezza Rice
2016 – Archie Manning
2017 – No award
2018 – Aaron Feis and Jason Seaman
2019 – Mark Harmon
