= Nate Northington =

American football player (born 1947)

Personal information
- Born: 1947 (age 78–79)

Career information
- College: Kentucky (1967); Western Kentucky (1969–1970)

Nathaniel "Nate" Northington (born 1947) was the first African-American to play college football in the Southeastern Conference (SEC). He became the first black scholarship athlete to play in an athletic contest of any kind in the SEC when his University of Kentucky Wildcats opened their 1967 season against Indiana in Bloomington, Indiana on September 23 of that year. One week later, he became the first black scholarship athlete to play in a contest involving two SEC teams when the Wildcats hosted Ole Miss in Lexington, Kentucky. (Note: The "scholarship" distinction is important here because Northington was not the first African-American athlete to play in the SEC. In March 1966, more than a year before Northington's Kentucky football debut (and also nearly six months before Northington initially enrolled at Kentucky), Tulane baseball player Stephen Martin had become the first African American to play any sport in the SEC. However, Martin was then a walk-on who was attending Tulane on an academic scholarship. Another reason why Martin has been overlooked as an SEC integration pioneer is that Tulane left the conference immediately after Martin's first varsity baseball season of 1966. It should also be noted that Northington was not the only African-American SEC scholarship athlete to make his debut in the 1967–68 school year; Perry Wallace made his varsity debut for Vanderbilt basketball later in 1967.)

Northington was a member of Kentucky's 1966 freshman team along with African-American teammate Greg Page. (At the time, freshmen were not allowed to play on NCAA varsity teams). Before the 1967 season, Page became paralyzed after suffering a spinal cord injury during an August practice. Northington was the only Wildcats player allowed by Kentucky athletic officials to visit Page in the hospital. Page died from his complications 38 days later – on the night before Northington's and Kentucky's game against Ole Miss.

Northington only played three minutes before dislocating his shoulder, and Kentucky would go on to lose 26-13. Immediately after returning from Page's funeral a few days later, Wildcats head coach Charlie Bradshaw put the team through a three-hour practice. Page had been Northington's roommate and pillar of support as they had jointly become the first two African-American men to play on a Kentucky football team. Northington was griefstricken about the loss of his best friend and missed some classes over the ensuing weeks. Five games into the season, his meal ticket revoked by the coach as penalty for missing classes meaning he could no longer eat with his teammates, Northington left the Wildcats team and later transferred to Western Kentucky University, where he would earn varsity letters in 1969 and 1970.

In 2016, the University of Kentucky unveiled a new statue of Northington, Page, Wilbur Hackett and Houston Hogg in recognition of the first four African-American football players in the SEC.

Northington is now the senior pastor of Newburg Apostolic Church in Newburg, a primarily African American community in Louisville Metro. He is a Oneness Apostolic Pentecostal preacher and has published his autobiography.
