= 1967 Kansas Jayhawks football team =

American college football season

1967 Kansas Jayhawks football
- Conference: Big Eight Conference
- Record: 5–5 (5–2 Big 8)
- Head coach: Pepper Rodgers (1st season)
- Captain: Mike Sweatman
- Home stadium: Memorial Stadium

1967 Big Eight Conference football standings
	Conf.					Overall
Team	W		L		T	W		L		T
No. 3 Oklahoma $	7	–	0	–	0	10	–	1	–	0
Colorado	5	–	2	–	0	9	–	2	–	0
Kansas	5	–	2	–	0	5	–	5	–	0
Missouri	4	–	3	–	0	7	–	3	–	0
Nebraska	3	–	4	–	0	6	–	4	–	0
Oklahoma State	3	–	4	–	0	4	–	5	–	1
Iowa State	1	–	6	–	0	2	–	8	–	0
Kansas State	0	–	7	–	0	1	–	9	–	0
$ – Conference champion; Rankings from AP Poll

The 1967 Kansas Jayhawks football team represented the University of Kansas in the Big Eight Conference during the 1967 NCAA University Division football season. In their first season under head coach Pepper Rodgers, the Jayhawks compiled a 5–5 record (5–2 against conference opponents), tied for second place in the Big Eight Conference, and outscored their opponents by a combined total of 166 to 146. They played their home games at Memorial Stadium in Lawrence, Kansas.

The team's statistical leaders included Bobby Douglass with 1,326 passing yards and 415 rushing yards and John Mosier with 495 receiving yards. Mike Sweatman was the team captain.

== Schedule ==
Date	Opponent	Site	Result	Attendance	Source
September 23	at Stanford*	Stanford Stadium; Stanford, CA	L 20–21	26,000	
September 30	at Indiana*	Seventeenth Street Stadium; Bloomington, IN	L 15–18	34,861	
October 7	Ohio*	Memorial Stadium; Lawrence, KS	L 15–30	18,000	
October 14	No. 8 Nebraska	Memorial Stadium; Lawrence, KS (rivalry)	W 10–0	40,000	
October 21	at Oklahoma State	Lewis Field; Stillwater, OK	W 26–15	34,000	
October 28	Iowa State	Memorial Stadium; Lawrence, KS	W 28–14	35,000	
November 4	Kansas State^{†}	Memorial Stadium; Lawrence, KS (rivalry)	W 17–16	44,500	
November 11	at Colorado	Folsom Field; Boulder, CO	L 8–12	40,200	
November 18	at No. 7 Oklahoma	Oklahoma Memorial Stadium; Norman, OK	L 10–14	58,300	
November 25	Missouri	Memorial Stadium; Lawrence, KS (Border War)	W 17–6	46,000	
*Non-conference game; ^{†}Homecoming; Rankings from AP Poll released prior to the game
