= 1967 Oklahoma State Cowboys football team =

American college football season

1967 Oklahoma State Cowboys football
- Conference: Big Eight Conference
- Record: 4–5–1 (3–4 Big 8)
- Head coach: Phil Cutchin (5th season)
- Home stadium: Lewis Field

1967 Big Eight Conference football standings
	Conf.					Overall
Team	W		L		T	W		L		T
No. 3 Oklahoma $	7	–	0	–	0	10	–	1	–	0
Colorado	5	–	2	–	0	9	–	2	–	0
Kansas	5	–	2	–	0	5	–	5	–	0
Missouri	4	–	3	–	0	7	–	3	–	0
Nebraska	3	–	4	–	0	6	–	4	–	0
Oklahoma State	3	–	4	–	0	4	–	5	–	1
Iowa State	1	–	6	–	0	2	–	8	–	0
Kansas State	0	–	7	–	0	1	–	9	–	0
$ – Conference champion; Rankings from AP Poll

The 1967 Oklahoma State Cowboys football team represented Oklahoma State University–Stillwater in the Big Eight Conference during the 1967 NCAA University Division football season. In their fifth season under head coach Phil Cutchin, the Cowboys compiled a 4–5–1 record (3–4 against conference opponents), tied for fifth place in the conference, and were outscored by opponents by a combined total of 140 to 123.

On offense, the 1967 team averaged 12.3 points scored, 165.9 rushing yards, and 100.6 passing yards per game. On defense, the team allowed an average of 14.0 points scored, 188.2 rushing yards, and 94.5 passing yards per game. The team's statistical leaders included Jack Reynolds with 643 rushing yards, Ronnie Johnson with 494 passing yards, Terry Brown with 425 receiving yards, and Larry Gosney with 36 points scored.

Back Harry Cheatwood was selected by the Central Press Association as a first-team All-American. Cheatwood and lineman Jon Kolb were selected as first-team All-Big Eight Conference players.

The team played its home games at Lewis Field in Stillwater, Oklahoma.

== Schedule ==
Date	Opponent	Site	Result	Attendance	Source
September 16	Air Force*	Lewis Field; Stillwater, OK	T 0–0	30,000	
September 23	at Arkansas*	War Memorial Stadium; Little Rock, AR	W 7–6	53,000	
October 7	at Texas*	Memorial Stadium; Austin, TX	L 0–19	51,000	
October 21	Kansas^{†}	Lewis Field; Stillwater, OK	L 15–26	34,000	
October 28	at No. 3 Colorado	Folsom Field; Boulder, CO	W 10–7	42,200	
November 4	Missouri	Lewis Field; Stillwater, OK	L 0–7	26,500	
November 11	at Nebraska	Memorial Stadium; Lincoln, NE	L 0–9	65,461	
November 18	at Iowa State	Clyde Williams Field; Ames, IA	W 28–14	10,000	
November 25	Kansas State	Lewis Field; Stillwater, OK	W 49–14	12,500	
December 2	at No. 5 Oklahoma	Oklahoma Memorial Stadium; Norman, OK (Bedlam Series)	L 14–38	61,826	
*Non-conference game; ^{†}Homecoming; Rankings from AP Poll released prior to the game
