= 1967 Ole Miss Rebels football team =

American college football season

1967 Ole Miss Rebels football

Sun Bowl, L 7–14 vs. UTEP
- Conference: Southeastern Conference
- Record: 6–4–1 (4–2–1 SEC)
- Head coach: Johnny Vaught (21st season)
- Home stadium: Hemingway Stadium; Mississippi Veterans Memorial Stadium

1967 Southeastern Conference football standings
	Conf.					Overall
Team	W		L		T	W		L		T
No. 2 Tennessee $	6	–	0	–	0	9	–	2	–	0
No. 8 Alabama	5	–	1	–	0	8	–	2	–	1
Georgia	4	–	2	–	0	7	–	4	–	0
Florida	4	–	2	–	0	6	–	4	–	0
Ole Miss	4	–	2	–	1	6	–	4	–	1
LSU	3	–	2	–	1	7	–	3	–	1
Auburn	3	–	3	–	0	6	–	4	–	0
Kentucky	1	–	6	–	0	2	–	8	–	0
Vanderbilt	0	–	6	–	0	2	–	7	–	1
Mississippi State	0	–	6	–	0	1	–	9	–	0
$ – Conference champion; Georgia's game against Clemson and Vanderbilt's game against Tulane counted in the conference standings.; Rankings from AP Poll

The 1967 Ole Miss Rebels football team represented the University of Mississippi during the 1967 NCAA University Division football season. The Rebels were led by 21st-year head coach Johnny Vaught and played their home games at Hemingway Stadium in Oxford, Mississippi and Mississippi Veterans Memorial Stadium in Jackson. The team competed as members of the Southeastern Conference, finishing in fourth. Ole Miss finished the regular season with a record of 6–3–1 and were invited to their 11th consecutive bowl game, the 1967 Sun Bowl, where they lost to UTEP.

== Schedule ==
Date	Opponent	Site	TV	Result	Attendance	Source
September 23	at Memphis State*	Memphis Memorial Stadium; Memphis, TN (rivalry)		L 17–27	50,414	
September 30	at Kentucky	McLean Stadium; Lexington, KY		W 26–13	33,000	
October 7	at No. 9 Alabama	Legion Field; Birmingham, AL (rivalry)	ABC	L 7–21	69,281	
October 14	No. 3 Georgia	Mississippi Veterans Memorial Stadium; Jackson, MS		W 29–20	38,900	
October 21	Southern Miss*	Hemingway Stadium; Oxford, MS		W 23–14	25,500	
October 28	No. 9 Houston*	Hemingway Stadium; Oxford, MS		W 14–13	26,500	
November 4	LSU	Mississippi Veterans Memorial Stadium; Jackson, MS (rivalry)		T 13–13	45,000	
November 18	vs. No. 2 Tennessee	Memphis Memorial Stadium; Memphis, TN (rivalry)		L 7–20	50,881	
November 25	at Vanderbilt	Dudley Field; Nashville, TN (rivalry)		W 28–7	12,000	
December 2	at Mississippi State	Scott Field; Starkville, MS (Egg Bowl)		W 10–3	21,000	
December 30	vs. UTEP*	Sun Bowl; El Paso, TX (Sun Bowl)		L 7–14	34,685	
*Non-conference game; Rankings from AP Poll released prior to the game

== Roster ==
- DB #35 Tommy Luke
