= 1967 Mississippi State Bulldogs football team =

American college football season

1967 Mississippi State Bulldogs football
- Conference: Southeastern Conference
- Record: 1–9 (0–6 SEC)
- Head coach: Charles Shira (1st season)
- Home stadium: Scott Field; Mississippi Veterans Memorial Stadium

1967 Southeastern Conference football standings
	Conf.					Overall
Team	W		L		T	W		L		T
No. 2 Tennessee $	6	–	0	–	0	9	–	2	–	0
No. 8 Alabama	5	–	1	–	0	8	–	2	–	1
Georgia	4	–	2	–	0	7	–	4	–	0
Florida	4	–	2	–	0	6	–	4	–	0
Ole Miss	4	–	2	–	1	6	–	4	–	1
LSU	3	–	2	–	1	7	–	3	–	1
Auburn	3	–	3	–	0	6	–	4	–	0
Kentucky	1	–	6	–	0	2	–	8	–	0
Vanderbilt	0	–	6	–	0	2	–	7	–	1
Mississippi State	0	–	6	–	0	1	–	9	–	0
$ – Conference champion; Georgia's game against Clemson and Vanderbilt's game against Tulane counted in the conference standings.; Rankings from AP Poll

The 1967 Mississippi State Bulldogs football team was an American football team that represented Mississippi State University as a member of the Southeastern Conference (SEC) during the 1967 NCAA University Division football season. In their first year under head coach Charles Shira, who had previously served as defensive coordinator at Texas, the Bulldogs compiled an overall record of 1–9 with a mark of 0–6 in conference play, tying for ninth place at the bottom of the SEC standings.

== Schedule ==
Date	Opponent	Site	Result	Attendance	Source
September 23	at No. 7 Georgia	Sanford Stadium; Athens, GA	L 0–30	54,512	
September 30	Florida	Mississippi Veterans Memorial Stadium; Jackson, MS	L 7–24	28,000	
October 7	at No. 10 Texas Tech*	Jones Stadium; Lubbock, TX	W 7–3	39,000	
October 14	Southern Miss*	Scott Field; Starkville, MS	L 14–21	24,000	
October 21	No. 9 Houston*	Scott Field; Starkville, MS	L 6–43	17,000	
October 28	at Florida State*	Doak Campbell Stadium; Tallahassee, FL	L 12–24	21,774	
November 4	at Alabama	Denny Stadium; Tuscaloosa, AL (rivalry)	L 0–13	58,059	
November 11	at Auburn	Cliff Hare Stadium; Auburn, AL	L 0–36	40,871–44,000	
November 18	at LSU	Tiger Stadium; Baton Rouge, LA (rivalry)	L 0–55	57,000	
December 2	Ole Miss	Scott Field; Starkville, MS (Egg Bowl)	L 3–10	21,000	
*Non-conference game; Rankings from AP Poll released prior to the game
