= 1967 Iowa State Cyclones football team =

American college football season

1967 Iowa State Cyclones football
- Conference: Big Eight Conference
- Record: 2–8 (1–6 Big 8)
- Head coach: Clay Stapleton (10th season)
- Captains: Dave Mayberry; Don Stanley
- Home stadium: Clyde Williams Field

1967 Big Eight Conference football standings
	Conf.					Overall
Team	W		L		T	W		L		T
No. 3 Oklahoma $	7	–	0	–	0	10	–	1	–	0
Colorado	5	–	2	–	0	9	–	2	–	0
Kansas	5	–	2	–	0	5	–	5	–	0
Missouri	4	–	3	–	0	7	–	3	–	0
Nebraska	3	–	4	–	0	6	–	4	–	0
Oklahoma State	3	–	4	–	0	4	–	5	–	1
Iowa State	1	–	6	–	0	2	–	8	–	0
Kansas State	0	–	7	–	0	1	–	9	–	0
$ – Conference champion; Rankings from AP Poll

The 1967 Iowa State Cyclones football team represented Iowa State University in the Big Eight Conference during the 1967 NCAA University Division football season. In their tenth and final year under head coach Clay Stapleton, the Cyclones compiled a 2–8 record (1–6 against conference opponents), finished in seventh place in the conference, and were outscored by opponents by a combined total of 275 to 86. They played their home games at Clyde Williams Field in Ames, Iowa.

Dave Mayberry and Don Stanley were the team captains.

== Schedule ==
Date	Time	Opponent	Site	Result	Attendance	Source
September 16	6:30 pm	at South Carolina*	Carolina Stadium; Columbia, SC	L 3–34	21,713–26,443	
September 23	7:30 pm	at Texas Tech*	Jones Stadium; Lubbock, TX	L 0–52	30,328	
September 30	1:30 pm	New Mexico*	Clyde Williams Field; Ames, IA	W 17–12	21,621	
October 7	2:30 pm	at No. 8 Colorado	Folsom Field; Boulder, CO	L 0–34	38,500	
October 14	1:30 pm	Kansas State	Clyde Williams Field; Ames, IA (rivalry)	W 17–0	22,000	
October 21	1:30 pm	Missouri^{†}	Clyde Williams Field; Ames, IA (rivalry)	L 7–23	25,000	
October 28	1:30 pm	at Kansas	Memorial Stadium; Lawrence, KS	L 14–28	35,000	
November 4	2:00 pm	at Nebraska	Memorial Stadium; Lincoln, NE (rivalry)	L 0–12	65,078	
November 11	1:30 pm	No. 8 Oklahoma	Clyde Williams Field; Ames, IA	L 14–52	14,000	
November 18	1:30 pm	Oklahoma State	Clyde Williams Field; Ames, IA	L 14–28	10,000	
*Non-conference game; ^{†}Homecoming; Rankings from AP Poll released prior to the game; All times are in Central time

== Personnel ==
- QB John Warder
