= 1967 LSU Tigers football team =

American college football season

1967 LSU Tigers football

Sugar Bowl champion

Sugar Bowl, W 20–13 vs. Wyoming
- Conference: Southeastern Conference
- Record: 7–3–1 (3–2–1 SEC)
- Head coach: Charles McClendon (6th season)
- Home stadium: Tiger Stadium

1967 Southeastern Conference football standings
	Conf.					Overall
Team	W		L		T	W		L		T
No. 2 Tennessee $	6	–	0	–	0	9	–	2	–	0
No. 8 Alabama	5	–	1	–	0	8	–	2	–	1
Georgia	4	–	2	–	0	7	–	4	–	0
Florida	4	–	2	–	0	6	–	4	–	0
Ole Miss	4	–	2	–	1	6	–	4	–	1
LSU	3	–	2	–	1	7	–	3	–	1
Auburn	3	–	3	–	0	6	–	4	–	0
Kentucky	1	–	6	–	0	2	–	8	–	0
Vanderbilt	0	–	6	–	0	2	–	7	–	1
Mississippi State	0	–	6	–	0	1	–	9	–	0
$ – Conference champion; Georgia's game against Clemson and Vanderbilt's game against Tulane counted in the conference standings.; Rankings from AP Poll

The 1967 LSU Tigers football team represented Louisiana State University during the 1967 NCAA University Division football season.

For the second time in three seasons, LSU was extended a bid for a bowl game on New Year's Day, despite having three losses. And as they did in the 1966 Cotton Bowl, the Tigers toppled an undefeated team in the 1968 Sugar Bowl, taking out Wyoming 20–13. It was LSU's last appearance in the Sugar Bowl for 17 years.

== Schedule ==
Date	Time	Opponent	Site	TV	Result	Attendance	Source
September 23		Rice*	Tiger Stadium; Baton Rouge, LA		W 20–14	66,000	
September 30		Texas A&M*	Tiger Stadium; Baton Rouge, LA (rivalry)		W 17–6	66,510	
October 7		at Florida	Florida Field; Gainesville, FL (rivalry)		W 37–6	59,261	
October 14		Miami (FL)*	Tiger Stadium; Baton Rouge, LA		L 15–17	67,000	
October 21		Kentucky^{†}	Tiger Stadium; Baton Rouge, LA		W 30–7	66,000	
October 29		at No. 4 Tennessee	Neyland Stadium; Knoxville, TN		L 14–17	54,596	
November 4		at Ole Miss	Mississippi Veterans Memorial Stadium; Jackson, MS (rivalry)		T 13–13	45,000	
November 11		Alabama	Tiger Stadium; Baton Rouge, LA (rivalry)	ABC	L 6–7	67,510	
November 18		Mississippi State	Tiger Stadium; Baton Rouge, LA (rivalry)		W 55–0	57,000	
November 25		Tulane*	Tiger Stadium; Baton Rouge, LA (Battle for the Rag)		W 41–27	66,000	
January 1, 1968	12:30 pm	vs. No. 6 Wyoming*	Tulane Stadium; New Orleans, LA (Sugar Bowl)	NBC	W 20–13	78,963	
*Non-conference game; ^{†}Homecoming; Rankings from AP Poll released prior to the game
