= 1967 Auburn Tigers football team =

American college football season

1967 Auburn Tigers football
- Conference: Southeastern Conference
- Record: 6–4 (3–3 SEC)
- Head coach: Ralph Jordan (17th season)
- Home stadium: Cliff Hare Stadium

1967 Southeastern Conference football standings
	Conf.					Overall
Team	W		L		T	W		L		T
No. 2 Tennessee $	6	–	0	–	0	9	–	2	–	0
No. 8 Alabama	5	–	1	–	0	8	–	2	–	1
Georgia	4	–	2	–	0	7	–	4	–	0
Florida	4	–	2	–	0	6	–	4	–	0
Ole Miss	4	–	2	–	1	6	–	4	–	1
LSU	3	–	2	–	1	7	–	3	–	1
Auburn	3	–	3	–	0	6	–	4	–	0
Kentucky	1	–	6	–	0	2	–	8	–	0
Vanderbilt	0	–	6	–	0	2	–	7	–	1
Mississippi State	0	–	6	–	0	1	–	9	–	0
$ – Conference champion; Georgia's game against Clemson and Vanderbilt's game against Tulane counted in the conference standings.; Rankings from AP Poll

The 1967 Auburn Tigers football team represented Auburn University in the 1967 NCAA University Division football season. It was the Tigers' 76th overall and 34th season as a member of the Southeastern Conference (SEC). The team was led by head coach Ralph "Shug" Jordan, in his 17th year, and played their home games at Cliff Hare Stadium in Auburn, Alabama. They finished with a record of six wins and four losses (6–4 overall, 3–3 in the SEC).

== Schedule ==
Date	Opponent	Site	Result	Attendance	Source
September 23	Chattanooga*	Cliff Hare Stadium; Auburn, AL	W 40–6	20,573–27,000	
September 30	at Tennessee	Neyland Stadium; Knoxville, TN (rivalry)	L 13–27	54,113–54,566	
October 7	Kentucky	Cliff Hare Stadium; Auburn, AL	W 48–7	24,962–28,000	
October 14	Clemson*	Cliff Hare Stadium; Auburn, AL (rivalry)	W 43–21	26,051	
October 21	at Georgia Tech*	Grant Field; Atlanta, GA (rivalry)	W 28–10	59,603	
October 27	at Miami (FL)*	Miami Orange Bowl; Miami, FL	L 0–7	50,056	
November 4	Florida	Cliff Hare Stadium; Auburn, AL (rivalry)	W 26–21	37,858–42,000	
November 11	Mississippi State^{†}	Cliff Hare Stadium; Auburn, AL	W 36–0	40,871–44,000	
November 18	at Georgia	Sanford Stadium; Athens, GA (rivalry)	L 0–17	59,060–56,709	
December 2	vs. No. 8 Alabama	Legion Field; Birmingham, AL (Iron Bowl)	L 3–7	69,723–71,200	
*Non-conference game; ^{†}Homecoming; Rankings from AP Poll released prior to the game

== Roster ==
1967 Auburn Tigers football team roster
Players
Coaches
Offense Charlie Glenn* OL Jerry Gordon* OL Al Giffin* RB Bucky Howard* OL Mike Perillard* TE Dick Pittman* OL

Pos.	#	Name	Class
C	52	Tom Banks	So
C	50	Forrest Blue	Sr
QB	18	Loran Carter	Jr
WR	88	Freddie Hyatt	Sr

Defense Bucky Ayers* DB Jim Bouchillon* DL Charles Collins* DL Tommy Groat DL Harold Ham DL Mike Holtzclaw LB Bill James* DL Bobby Wilson DB

Pos.	#	Name	Class
DT	70	David Campbell	So
DB	26	Jimmy Carter	Sr
LB	54	Mike Kolen	So
DT	71	Roy Tatum	Sr
LB	65	Ron Yarbrough	So
DB	49	Don Webb	So
DT	62	Richard Wood	Sr

Special teams

Pos.	#	Name	Class

Head coach

- Ralph Jordan

Coordinators/assistant coaches

Legend

- (C) Team captain
- (S) Suspended
- (I) Ineligible
- Injured
- Redshirt
