= 1967 Kansas State Wildcats football team =

Football team

1967 Kansas State Wildcats football
- Conference: Big Eight Conference
- Record: 1–9 (0–7 Big 8)
- Head coach: Vince Gibson (1st season)
- Home stadium: Memorial Stadium

1967 Big Eight Conference football standings
	Conf.					Overall
Team	W		L		T	W		L		T
No. 3 Oklahoma $	7	–	0	–	0	10	–	1	–	0
Colorado	5	–	2	–	0	9	–	2	–	0
Kansas	5	–	2	–	0	5	–	5	–	0
Missouri	4	–	3	–	0	7	–	3	–	0
Nebraska	3	–	4	–	0	6	–	4	–	0
Oklahoma State	3	–	4	–	0	4	–	5	–	1
Iowa State	1	–	6	–	0	2	–	8	–	0
Kansas State	0	–	7	–	0	1	–	9	–	0
$ – Conference champion; Rankings from AP Poll

The 1967 Kansas State Wildcats football team represented Kansas State University in the 1967 NCAA University Division football season. The team's head football coach was Vince Gibson. The Wildcats played their home games in Memorial Stadium. 1967 saw the Wildcats finish with a record of 1–9, and a 0–7 record in Big Eight Conference play. 1967 was the last season that the team played at Memorial Stadium. In 1968 the team moved to KSU Stadium.

== Schedule ==
Date	Opponent	Site	Result	Attendance	Source
September 23	at Colorado State*	Colorado Field; Fort Collins, CO	W 17–7	14,600	
September 29	Virginia Tech*	Memorial Stadium; Manhattan, KS	L 3–15	20,500	
October 7	No. 7 Nebraska	Memorial Stadium; Manhattan, KS (rivalry)	L 14–16	20,000	
October 14	at Iowa State	Clyde Williams Field; Ames, IA (rivalry)	L 0–17	22,000	
October 21	Oklahoma^{†}	Memorial Stadium; Manhattan, KS	L 7–46	19,000	
October 28	at Arkansas*	War Memorial Stadium; Little Rock, AR	L 7–28	40,000	
November 4	at Kansas	Memorial Stadium; Lawrence, KS (rivalry)	L 16–17	44,500	
November 11	at Missouri	Memorial Stadium; Columbia, MO	L 6–28	50,200	
November 18	No. 19 Colorado	Memorial Stadium; Manhattan, KS (rivalry)	L 6–40	14,500	
November 25	at Oklahoma State	Lewis Field; Stillwater, OK	L 14–49	12,500	
*Non-conference game; ^{†}Homecoming; Rankings from AP Poll released prior to the game
