= 1967 Vanderbilt Commodores football team =

American college football season

1967 Vanderbilt Commodores football
- Conference: Southeastern Conference
- Record: 2–7–1 (0–6 SEC)
- Head coach: Bill Pace (1st season)
- Home stadium: Dudley Field

1967 Southeastern Conference football standings
	Conf.					Overall
Team	W		L		T	W		L		T
No. 2 Tennessee $	6	–	0	–	0	9	–	2	–	0
No. 8 Alabama	5	–	1	–	0	8	–	2	–	1
Georgia	4	–	2	–	0	7	–	4	–	0
Florida	4	–	2	–	0	6	–	4	–	0
Ole Miss	4	–	2	–	1	6	–	4	–	1
LSU	3	–	2	–	1	7	–	3	–	1
Auburn	3	–	3	–	0	6	–	4	–	0
Kentucky	1	–	6	–	0	2	–	8	–	0
Vanderbilt	0	–	6	–	0	2	–	7	–	1
Mississippi State	0	–	6	–	0	1	–	9	–	0
$ – Conference champion; Georgia's game against Clemson and Vanderbilt's game against Tulane counted in the conference standings.; Rankings from AP Poll

The 1967 Vanderbilt Commodores football team represented Vanderbilt University as a member of the Southeastern Conference (SEC) during the 1967 NCAA University Division football season. Led by first-year head coach Bill Pace, the Commodores compiled an overall record of 2–7–1 with a mark of 0–6 in conference play, tying for ninth place at the bottom of the SEC standings. Vanderbilt played home games at Dudley Field in Nashville, Tennessee.

== Schedule ==
Date	Opponent	Site	Result	Attendance	Source
September 23	Georgia Tech*	Dudley Field; Nashville, TN (rivalry)	L 10–17	24,000	
September 30	William & Mary*	Dudley Field; Nashville, TN	W 14–12	14,616	
October 7	at North Carolina*	Kenan Memorial Stadium; Chapel Hill, NC	W 21–7	25,000	
October 14	No. 7 Alabama	Dudley Field; Nashville, TN	L 21–35	33,407	
October 28	at Florida	Florida Field; Gainesville, FL	L 22–27	61,855	
November 4	at Tulane (Note: Vanderbilt's game against Tulane counted in the SEC standings.)	Tulane Stadium; New Orleans, LA	L 14–27	18,160	
November 11	Kentucky	Dudley Field; Nashville, TN (rivalry)	L 7–12	18,942	
November 18	at Navy*	Navy–Marine Corps Memorial Stadium; Annapolis, MD	T 35–35	18,054	
November 25	Ole Miss	Dudley Field; Nashville, TN (rivalry)	L 7–28	12,000	
December 2	at No. 2 Tennessee	Neyland Stadium; Knoxville, TN (rivalry)	L 14–41	49,787	
*Non-conference game; Rankings from AP Poll released prior to the game
