= 1967 Houston Cougars football team =

American college football season

1967 Houston Cougars football
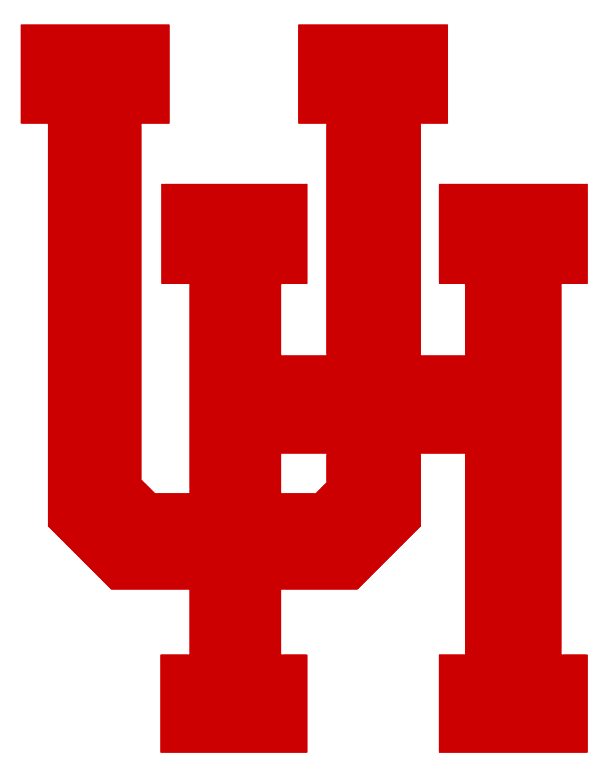
- Conference: Independent

Ranking
- Coaches: No. 19
- Record: 7–3
- Head coach: Bill Yeoman (6th season)
- Offensive scheme: Houston Veer
- Defensive coordinator: Melvin Robertson (3rd season)
- Captain: Royce Berry
- Home stadium: Houston Astrodome

1967 NCAA University Division independents football records
	Conf.			Overall
Team	W	L	T	W		L		T
Army		–		8	–	2	–	0
No. 5 Notre Dame		–		8	–	2	–	0
Syracuse		–		8	–	2	–	0
No. 10 Penn State		–		8	–	2	–	1
New Mexico State		–		7	–	2	–	1
UTEP		–		7	–	2	–	1
Utah State		–		7	–	2	–	1
Florida State		–		7	–	2	–	2
West Texas State		–		8	–	3	–	0
Houston		–		7	–	3	–	0
Virginia Tech		–		7	–	3	–	0
Memphis State		–		6	–	3	–	0
Southern Miss		–		6	–	3	–	0
Dayton		–		6	–	3	–	1
Xavier		–		6	–	3	–	1
Miami (FL)		–		7	–	4	–	0
Buffalo		–		6	–	4	–	0
Navy		–		5	–	4	–	1
Holy Cross		–		5	–	5	–	0
Colorado State		–		4	–	5	–	1
Boston College		–		4	–	6	–	0
Georgia Tech		–		4	–	6	–	0
Villanova		–		4	–	6	–	0
Air Force		–		2	–	6	–	2
Tulane		–		3	–	7	–	0
San Jose State		–		2	–	7	–	0
Colgate		–		2	–	8	–	0
Pittsburgh		–		1	–	9	–	0
Rankings from AP Poll

The 1967 Houston Cougars football team, also known as the Houston Cougars, Houston, or UH, represented the University of Houston in the 1967 NCAA University Division football season. It was the 22nd of season play for Houston. The team was coached by sixth-year head coach Bill Yeoman who was inducted into the College Football Hall of Fame in 2001. The team played its home games in the Astrodome, a 53,000-person capacity stadium off-campus in Houston. Houston competed as a member of the NCAA in the University Division, independent of any athletic conference. It was their eighth year of doing so. At this time, Houston was on probation from the NCAA, and therefore was not eligible to compete in any post-season bowl games. Following the overall season, several players were selected for the 1968 NFL/AFL draft.

== Schedule ==
Date	Opponent	Rank	Site	Result	Attendance	Source
September 15	Florida State		Houston Astrodome; Houston, TX	W 33–13	40,336	
September 23	at No. 3 Michigan State		Spartan Stadium; East Lansing, MI	W 37–7	75,833	
September 29	Wake Forest	No. 3	Houston Astrodome; Houston, TX	W 50–6	41,769	
October 7	NC State	No. 2	Houston Astrodome; Houston, TX	L 6–16	52,483	
October 21	at Mississippi State	No. 9	Scott Field; Starkville, MS	W 43–6	17,000	
October 28	at Ole Miss	No. 9	Hemingway Stadium; Oxford, MS	L 13–14	26,500	
November 4	No. 5 Georgia^{†}		Houston Astrodome; Houston, TX	W 15–14	53,356	
November 11	Memphis State	No. 10	Houston Astrodome; Houston, TX	W 35–18	46,050	
November 18	Idaho		Houston Astrodome; Houston, TX	W 77–6	40,050–40,464	
November 25	at Tulsa	No. 10	Skelly Stadium; Tulsa, OK	L 13–22	26,300	
^{†}Homecoming; Rankings from AP Poll released prior to the game

== Poll rankings ==
Week-to-Week Rankings Legend: ██ Increase in ranking. ██ Decrease in ranking. ██ Not ranked the previous week.
Poll	Pre	Wk 1	Wk 2	Wk 3	Wk 4	Wk 5	Wk 6	Wk 7	Wk 8	Wk 9	Wk 10	Wk 11	Final
AP	NR	RV	3(6)	2(10)	10	10	9	9	RV	10	RV	10	NR

== Coaching staff ==
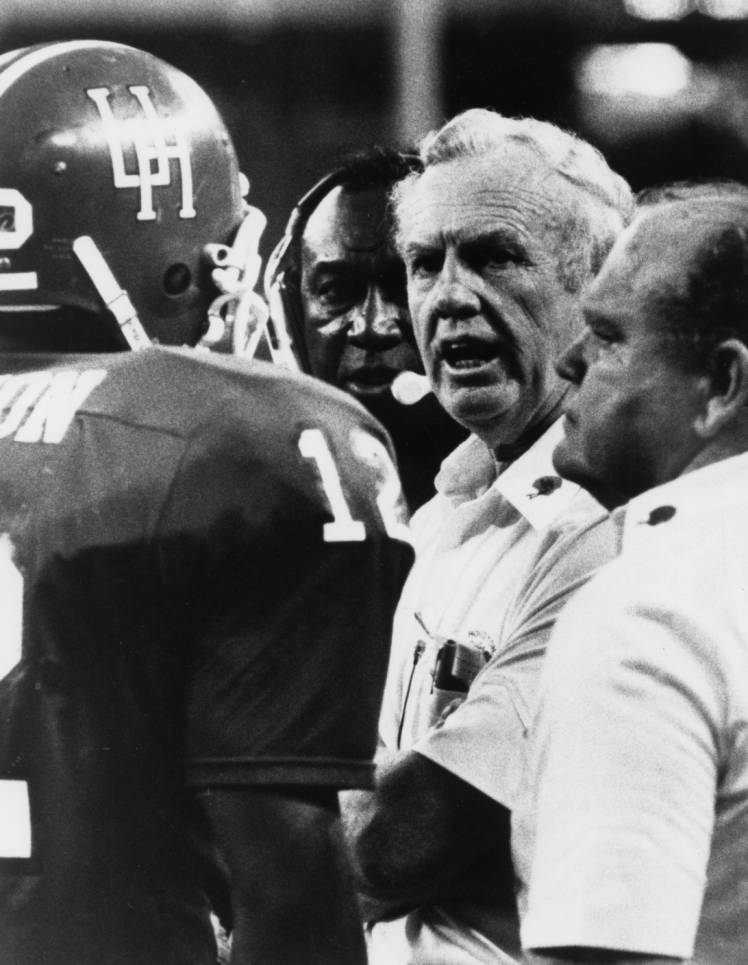
Head coach Bill Yeoman coaches Houston

Name	Position	Alma mater (Year)	Year at Houston
Bill Yeoman	Head coach/offensive coordinator	Army (1948)	6th
Melvin Robertson	Defensive coordinator	West Texas State (1950)	3rd
Melvin Brown	Offensive backs coach	Oklahoma (1954)	6th
Billy Willingham	Offensive line coach	TCU (1951)	2nd
Ben Hurt	Defensive line coach	Middle Tennessee (1957)	3rd
Howard Tippett	Linebackers coach	East Tennessee State (1958)	1st
Joe Arenas	Wide receivers coach	Nebraska-Omaha (1951)	5th
Carroll Schultz	Freshmen coach	Louisiana Tech (1948)	6th
Bobby Baldwin	Freshmen coach	Houston (1958)	3rd
