= 1967 Georgia Tech Yellow Jackets football team =

American college football season

1967 Georgia Tech Yellow Jackets football
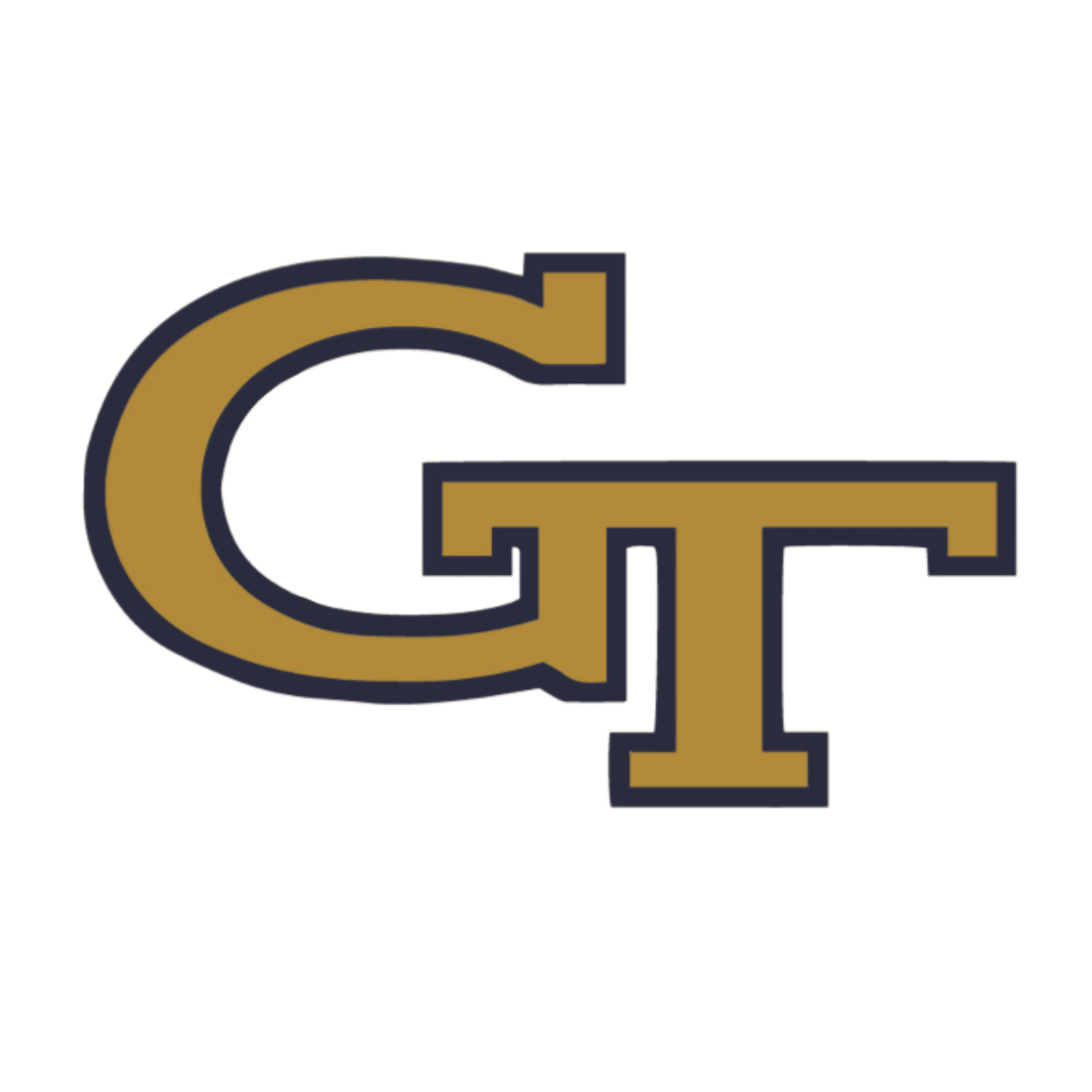
- Conference: Independent
- Record: 4–6
- Head coach: Bud Carson (1st season)
- Captains: Kim King; David Barber; Randall Edmunds
- Home stadium: Grant Field

1967 NCAA University Division independents football records
	Conf.			Overall
Team	W	L	T	W		L		T
Army		–		8	–	2	–	0
No. 5 Notre Dame		–		8	–	2	–	0
Syracuse		–		8	–	2	–	0
No. 10 Penn State		–		8	–	2	–	1
New Mexico State		–		7	–	2	–	1
UTEP		–		7	–	2	–	1
Utah State		–		7	–	2	–	1
Florida State		–		7	–	2	–	2
West Texas State		–		8	–	3	–	0
Houston		–		7	–	3	–	0
Virginia Tech		–		7	–	3	–	0
Memphis State		–		6	–	3	–	0
Southern Miss		–		6	–	3	–	0
Dayton		–		6	–	3	–	1
Xavier		–		6	–	3	–	1
Miami (FL)		–		7	–	4	–	0
Buffalo		–		6	–	4	–	0
Navy		–		5	–	4	–	1
Holy Cross		–		5	–	5	–	0
Colorado State		–		4	–	5	–	1
Boston College		–		4	–	6	–	0
Georgia Tech		–		4	–	6	–	0
Villanova		–		4	–	6	–	0
Air Force		–		2	–	6	–	2
Tulane		–		3	–	7	–	0
San Jose State		–		2	–	7	–	0
Colgate		–		2	–	8	–	0
Pittsburgh		–		1	–	9	–	0
Rankings from AP Poll

The 1967 Georgia Tech Yellow Jackets football team represented the Georgia Institute of Technology as an independent during the 1967 NCAA University Division football season. The Yellow Jackets were led by first-year head coach Bud Carson, who replaced Bobby Dodd, the winningest head coach in Georgia Tech history, after his retirement. They played their home games at Grant Field in Atlanta.

== Schedule ==
Date	Opponent	Site	TV	Result	Attendance	Source
September 23	at Vanderbilt	Dudley Field; Nashville, TN (rivalry)		W 17–10	24,000	
September 30	TCU	Grant Field; Atlanta, GA		W 24–7	55,299	
October 7	Clemson	Grant Field; Atlanta, GA (rivalry)		W 10–0	59,588	
October 14	at Tennessee	Neyland Stadium; Knoxville, TN (rivalry)	ABC	L 13–24	55,119	
October 21	Auburn	Grant Field; Atlanta, GA (rivalry)		L 10–28	59,603	
October 28	at Tulane	Tulane Stadium; New Orleans, LA		L 12–23	29,643	
November 4	Duke^{†}	Grant Field; Atlanta, GA		W 19–7	50,103	
November 10	at Miami (FL)	Miami Orange Bowl; Miami, FL		L 7–49	48,267	
November 18	No. 9 Notre Dame	Grant Field; Atlanta, GA (rivalry)		L 3–36	60,024	
November 25	Georgia	Grant Field; Atlanta, GA (Clean, Old-Fashioned Hate)	ABC	L 14–21	53,699	
^{†}Homecoming; Rankings from AP Poll released prior to the game
