= 1967 Missouri Tigers football team =

American college football season

1967 Missouri Tigers football
- Conference: Big Eight Conference
- Record: 7–3 (4–3 Big 8)
- Head coach: Dan Devine (10th season)
- Home stadium: Memorial Stadium

1967 Big Eight Conference football standings
	Conf.					Overall
Team	W		L		T	W		L		T
No. 3 Oklahoma $	7	–	0	–	0	10	–	1	–	0
Colorado	5	–	2	–	0	9	–	2	–	0
Kansas	5	–	2	–	0	5	–	5	–	0
Missouri	4	–	3	–	0	7	–	3	–	0
Nebraska	3	–	4	–	0	6	–	4	–	0
Oklahoma State	3	–	4	–	0	4	–	5	–	1
Iowa State	1	–	6	–	0	2	–	8	–	0
Kansas State	0	–	7	–	0	1	–	9	–	0
$ – Conference champion; Rankings from AP Poll

The 1967 Missouri Tigers football team was an American football team that represented the University of Missouri in the Big Eight Conference (Big 8) during the 1967 NCAA University Division football season. The team compiled a 7–3 record (4–3 against Big 8 opponents), finished in fourth place in the Big 8, and outscored opponents by a combined total of 134 to 76. Dan Devine was the head coach for the 10th of 13 seasons. The team played its home games at Memorial Stadium in Columbia, Missouri.

The team's statistical leaders included Barry Lischner with 647 rushing yards, Gary Kombrink with 452 passing yards and 972 yards of total offense, Chuck Weber with 212 receiving yards, and Jay Wallace with 27 points scored.

== Schedule ==
Date	Opponent	Site	Result	Attendance	Source
September 23	SMU*	Memorial Stadium; Columbia, MO	W 21–0	53,000	
September 30	at Northwestern*	Dyche Stadium; Evanston, IL	W 13–6	35,214	
October 7	Arizona*	Memorial Stadium; Columbia, MO	W 17–3	5,500	
October 14	at No. 6 Colorado	Folsom Field; Boulder, CO	L 9–23	44,517	
October 21	at Iowa State	Clyde Williams Field; Ames, IA (rivalry)	W 23–7	25,000	
October 28	Oklahoma	Memorial Stadium; Columbia, MO (rivalry)	L 0–7	55,000	
November 4	at Oklahoma State	Lewis Field; Stillwater, OK	W 7–0	26,500	
November 11	Kansas State	Memorial Stadium; Columbia, MO	W 28–6	50,200	
November 18	Nebraska	Memorial Stadium; Columbia, MO (rivalry)	W 10–7	56,400	
November 25	at Kansas	Memorial Stadium; Lawrence, KS (Border War)	L 6–17	46,000	
*Non-conference game; Rankings from AP Poll released prior to the game
