= 1967 Georgia Bulldogs football team =

American college football season

1967 Georgia Bulldogs football

Liberty Bowl, L 7–14 vs. NC State
- Conference: Southeastern Conference

Ranking
- Coaches: No. 18
- Record: 7–4 (4–2 SEC)
- Head coach: Vince Dooley (4th season)
- Defensive coordinator: Erk Russell (4th season)
- Home stadium: Sanford Stadium

1967 Southeastern Conference football standings
	Conf.					Overall
Team	W		L		T	W		L		T
No. 2 Tennessee $	6	–	0	–	0	9	–	2	–	0
No. 8 Alabama	5	–	1	–	0	8	–	2	–	1
Georgia	4	–	2	–	0	7	–	4	–	0
Florida	4	–	2	–	0	6	–	4	–	0
Ole Miss	4	–	2	–	1	6	–	4	–	1
LSU	3	–	2	–	1	7	–	3	–	1
Auburn	3	–	3	–	0	6	–	4	–	0
Kentucky	1	–	6	–	0	2	–	8	–	0
Vanderbilt	0	–	6	–	0	2	–	7	–	1
Mississippi State	0	–	6	–	0	1	–	9	–	0
$ – Conference champion; Georgia's game against Clemson and Vanderbilt's game against Tulane counted in the conference standings.; Rankings from AP Poll

The 1967 Georgia Bulldogs football team represented the University of Georgia as a member of the Southeastern Conference (SEC) during the 1967 NCAA University Division football season. Led by fourth-year head coach Vince Dooley, the Bulldogs compiled an overall record of 7–4 with a mark of 4–2 in conference play, and tying for third place in the SEC. Georgia was invited to the Liberty Bowl, where the Bulldogs lost to NC State. The team played home games at Sanford Stadium in Athens, Georgia.

== Schedule ==
Date	Opponent	Rank	Site	TV	Result	Attendance	Source
September 23	Mississippi State	No. 7	Sanford Stadium; Athens, GA		W 30–0	54,512	
September 30	at Clemson (Note: Georgia's game against Clemson counted in the SEC standings.)	No. 5	Memorial Stadium; Clemson, SC (rivalry)		W 24–17	46,362	
October 7	South Carolina*	No. 5	Sanford Stadium; Athens, GA (rivalry)		W 21–0	58,182	
October 14	at Ole Miss	No. 3	Mississippi Veterans Memorial Stadium; Jackson, MS		L 20–29	38,900	
October 21	VMI*	No. 8	Sanford Stadium; Athens, GA		W 56–6	50,307	
October 28	at Kentucky	No. 6	McLean Stadium; Lexington, KY		W 31–7	28,000	
November 4	at Houston*	No. 5	Houston Astrodome; Houston, TX		L 14–15	53,356	
November 11	vs. Florida		Gator Bowl Stadium; Jacksonville, FL (rivalry)	ABC	L 16–17	69,489	
November 18	Auburn^{†}		Sanford Stadium; Athens, GA (rivalry)		W 17–0	59,060–56,709	
November 25	Georgia Tech*		Grant Field; Atlanta, GA (rivalry)	ABC	W 21–14	53,699	
December 16	vs. NC State*		Memphis Memorial Stadium; Memphis, TN (Liberty Bowl)	ABC	L 7–14	35,045	
*Non-conference game; ^{†}Homecoming; Rankings from AP Poll released prior to the game

== Roster ==
1967 Georgia Bulldogs football team roster
Players			Coaches
Offense: Pos. / # / Name / Class; QB / / Kirby Moore / Sr	Defense: Pos. / # / Name / Class	Special teams: Pos. / # / Name / Class	Head coach: Vince Dooley; Coordinators/assistant coaches Legend: (C) Team captain; (S) Suspended; (I) Ineligible; Injured; Redshirt
