= 1967 Florida Gators football team =

American college football season

1967 Florida Gators football
- Conference: Southeastern Conference
- Record: 6–4 (4–2 SEC)
- Head coach: Ray Graves (8th season)
- Offensive coordinator: Ed Kensler (3rd season)
- Defensive coordinator: Gene Ellenson (4th season)
- Home stadium: Florida Field

1967 Southeastern Conference football standings
	Conf.					Overall
Team	W		L		T	W		L		T
No. 2 Tennessee $	6	–	0	–	0	9	–	2	–	0
No. 8 Alabama	5	–	1	–	0	8	–	2	–	1
Georgia	4	–	2	–	0	7	–	4	–	0
Florida	4	–	2	–	0	6	–	4	–	0
Ole Miss	4	–	2	–	1	6	–	4	–	1
LSU	3	–	2	–	1	7	–	3	–	1
Auburn	3	–	3	–	0	6	–	4	–	0
Kentucky	1	–	6	–	0	2	–	8	–	0
Vanderbilt	0	–	6	–	0	2	–	7	–	1
Mississippi State	0	–	6	–	0	1	–	9	–	0
$ – Conference champion; Georgia's game against Clemson and Vanderbilt's game against Tulane counted in the conference standings.; Rankings from AP Poll

The 1967 Florida Gators football team represented the University of Florida during the 1967 NCAA University Division football season. The season was the eighth for Ray Graves as the head coach of the Florida Gators football team. Graves' 1967 Florida Gators posted a 6–4 overall record and a 4–2 record in the Southeastern Conference (SEC), tying for third among the ten SEC teams.

== Schedule ==
Date	Opponent	Site	TV	Result	Attendance	Source
September 23	Illinois*	Florida Field; Gainesville, FL		W 14–0	57,391	
September 30	at Mississippi State	Mississippi Veterans Memorial Stadium; Jackson, MS		W 24–7	28,000	
October 7	LSU	Florida Field; Gainesville, FL (rivalry)		L 6–37	59,261	
October 14	at Tulane*	Tulane Stadium; New Orleans, LA		W 35–0	24,450–24,500	
October 28	Vanderbilt^{†}	Florida Field; Gainesville, FL		W 27–22	61,855	
November 4	at Auburn	Cliff Hare Stadium; Auburn, AL (rivalry)		L 21–26	37,858–42,000	
November 11	vs. Georgia	Gator Bowl Stadium; Jacksonville, FL (rivalry)	ABC	W 17–16	69,489	
November 18	Kentucky	Florida Field; Gainesville, FL (rivalry)		W 28–12	50,833	
November 25	Florida State*	Florida Field; Gainesville, FL (rivalry)		L 16–21	62,944	
December 9	at Miami (FL)*	Miami Orange Bowl; Miami, FL (rivalry)	ABC	L 13–20	53,229	
*Non-conference game; ^{†}Homecoming

== Game summaries ==
=== Georgia ===
In the Georgia game, Richard Trapp sparked a Gator comeback with a 57-yard touchdown catch-and-run. Wayne Barfield kicked the field goal with 34 seconds left to upset the Bulldogs, 17–16.

== Roster ==
1967 Florida Gators football team roster
Players
Coaches
Offense

Pos.	#	Name	Class
QB		Jackie Eckdahl
QB		Larry Rentz
WR		Richard Trapp	Sr
QB		Harmon Wages	Sr

Defense

Pos.	#	Name	Class

Special teams

Pos.	#	Name	Class

Head coach

- Ray Graves

Coordinators/assistant coaches

Legend

- (C) Team captain
- (S) Suspended
- (I) Ineligible
- Injured
- Redshirt
