= 1967 Florida State Seminoles football team =

American college football season

1967 Florida State Seminoles football

Gator Bowl, T 17–17 vs. Penn State
- Conference: Independent

Ranking
- Coaches: No. 15
- Record: 7–2–2
- Head coach: Bill Peterson (8th season)
- Offensive coordinator: Don Breaux (1st season)
- Offensive scheme: Pro set
- Defensive coordinator: Bob Harbison (2nd season)
- Base defense: 4–3
- Captain: Game captains
- Home stadium: Doak Campbell Stadium

1967 NCAA University Division independents football records
	Conf.			Overall
Team	W	L	T	W		L		T
Army		–		8	–	2	–	0
No. 5 Notre Dame		–		8	–	2	–	0
Syracuse		–		8	–	2	–	0
No. 10 Penn State		–		8	–	2	–	1
New Mexico State		–		7	–	2	–	1
UTEP		–		7	–	2	–	1
Utah State		–		7	–	2	–	1
Florida State		–		7	–	2	–	2
West Texas State		–		8	–	3	–	0
Houston		–		7	–	3	–	0
Virginia Tech		–		7	–	3	–	0
Memphis State		–		6	–	3	–	0
Southern Miss		–		6	–	3	–	0
Dayton		–		6	–	3	–	1
Xavier		–		6	–	3	–	1
Miami (FL)		–		7	–	4	–	0
Buffalo		–		6	–	4	–	0
Navy		–		5	–	4	–	1
Holy Cross		–		5	–	5	–	0
Colorado State		–		4	–	5	–	1
Boston College		–		4	–	6	–	0
Georgia Tech		–		4	–	6	–	0
Villanova		–		4	–	6	–	0
Air Force		–		2	–	6	–	2
Tulane		–		3	–	7	–	0
San Jose State		–		2	–	7	–	0
Colgate		–		2	–	8	–	0
Pittsburgh		–		1	–	9	–	0
Rankings from AP Poll

The 1967 Florida State Seminoles football team represented Florida State University as an independent during the 1967 NCAA University Division football season. Led by eighth-year head coach Bill Peterson, the Seminoles compiled a record of 7–2–2. Florida State was invited to the Gator Bowl, where they tied Penn State.

== Schedule ==
Date	Opponent	Site	TV	Result	Attendance	Source
September 15	at Houston	Astrodome; Houston, TX		L 13–33	40,336	
September 23	at No. 2 Alabama	Legion Field; Birmingham, AL		T 37–37	71,299	
September 30	NC State	Doak Campbell Stadium; Tallahassee, FL		L 10–20	34,573	
October 7	at Texas A&M	Kyle Field; College Station, TX		W 19–18	20,000	
October 14	South Carolina	Doak Campbell Stadium; Tallahassee, FL		W 17–0	33,022	
October 21	Texas Tech	Doak Campbell Stadium; Tallahassee, FL		W 28–12	33,179	
October 28	Mississippi State	Doak Campbell Stadium; Tallahassee, FL		W 24–12	21,774	
November 4	at Memphis State	Memphis Memorial Stadium; Memphis, TN		W 26–7	30,304	
November 11	Virginia Tech	Doak Campbell Stadium; Tallahassee, FL		W 38–15	29,856	
November 25	at Florida	Florida Field; Gainesville, FL (rivalry)		W 21–16	62,944	
December 30	vs. No. 10 Penn State	Gator Bowl Stadium; Jacksonville, FL (Gator Bowl)	ABC	T 17–17	68,019	
Rankings from AP Poll released prior to the game

== Roster ==
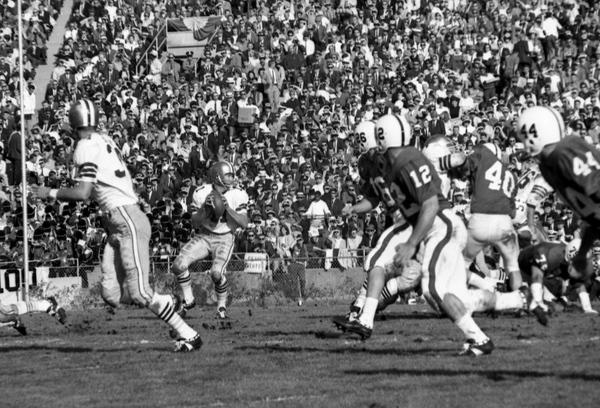
FSU in the 1967 Gator Bowl vs. Penn State

- QB #14 Bill Cappleman, So.
