= 1968 Orange Bowl =

American college football game

- 34th Orange Bowl
- The Miami Orange Bowl in Miami, Florida, hosted the Orange Bowl.
Oklahoma Sooners	Tennessee Volunteers
(9–1)	(9–1)
Big Eight	SEC
26	24
Head coach: Chuck Fairbanks	Head coach: Doug Dickey
AP / Coaches; 3 / 3	AP / Coaches; 2 / 2
	1	2	3	4	Total
Oklahoma	7	12	0	7	26
Tennessee	0	0	14	10	24
- Date: January 1, 1968
- Season: 1967
- Stadium: Orange Bowl
- Location: Miami, Florida
- MVP: Bob Warmack (Oklahoma QB)
- Favorite: Tennessee
- Referee: R. Pete Williams (SEC) (split crew: SEC, Big 8)
- Attendance: 76,563
- Payout: US$285,000 per team

United States TV coverage
- Network: NBC
- Announcers: Jim Simpson, Kyle Rote
- Nielsen ratings: 18.4

The 1968 Orange Bowl was the 34th edition of the college football bowl game, played at the Orange Bowl in Miami, Florida, on Monday, January 1. The third-ranked Oklahoma Sooners of the Big Eight Conference defeated the Tennessee Volunteers of the Southeastern Conference (SEC), 26–24.

== Teams ==
=== Oklahoma ===
Oklahoma won all seven games in Big Eight Conference play for their first title since 1962 and first Orange Bowl since 1963. The only blemish was a two-point loss to rival Texas at the Cotton Bowl in Dallas on October 14.

Entering his second season as head coach, 37-year-old Jim Mackenzie suffered a fatal heart attack at his Norman home in late April. Assistant coach Chuck Fairbanks, age 33, was promoted several days later.

=== Tennessee ===
After a four-point loss at UCLA in the season opener, Tennessee won nine consecutive games. They were perfect in Southeastern Conference play and were champions for the first time since 1956. It was Tennessee's first Orange Bowl since 1947.

Tennessee did not get to play top-ranked USC in the Rose Bowl; the Trojans met #4 Indiana, the Big Ten co-champion, due to the Pac-8 – Big Ten contract.

The Volunteers' soccer-style placekicker Karl Kremser was a war refugee from Germany.

== Game summary ==
This was the fourth straight year for a night kickoff at the Orange Bowl, following the Rose Bowl. Both teams wore their home jerseys, Oklahoma in crimson and Tennessee in orange. The temperature was 70 °F (21 °C).

Quarterback Bob Warmack gave the Sooners a 7–0 lead on his ten-yard touchdown run in the first quarter. He added a twenty-yard touchdown pass to Eddie Hinton in the second quarter, and running back Steve Owens scored from a yard out to make it 19–0 at halftime.

Held scoreless until midway into the third quarter, Tennessee's Jimmy Glover returned an interception 36 yards for a touchdown. Two minutes later, another interception by Jim Weatherford set up a five-yard touchdown run by Charley Fulton (19–14).

A Karl Kremser field goal from 26 yards closed the gap to 19–17 early in the fourth quarter. Oklahoma went up 26–17 on Bob Stephenson's 25-yard interception return for a touchdown. Tennessee then answered with quarterback Dewey Warren's touchdown plunge to pull back to two points at 26–24.

Oklahoma was at their own 43-yard line with just under two minutes remaining. First-year head coach Fairbanks opted to go for the first down, despite only leading by two points. Owens was given the ball, but was stopped by linebacker Jack Reynolds, and the ball went back to the Volunteers. With seven seconds to go, Tennessee sent Kremser in to attempt a 43-yard field goal, but his kick sailed wide right, and Oklahoma won.

=== Scoring ===
First quarter

- Oklahoma – Bob Warmack 7-yard run (Mike Vachon kick)

Second quarter

- Oklahoma – Eddie Hinton 20-yard pass from Warmack (kick failed)
- Oklahoma – Steve Owens 1-yard run (run failed)

Third quarter

- Tennessee – Jimmy Glover 36-yard interception return (Karl Kremser kick)
- Tennessee – Charley Fulton 5-yard run (Kremser kick)

Fourth quarter

- Oklahoma – Bob Stephenson 23-yard interception return (Vachon kick)
- Tennessee – Kremser 26-yard FG
- Tennessee – Dewey Warren 1-yard run (Kremser kick)

== Statistics ==
Statistics	Oklahoma	Tennessee
First downs	18	18
Rushes–yards	50–203	44–172
Passing yards	107	160
Passes (C–A–I)	9–18–3	12–23–2
Total offense	68–310	67–332
Punts–average	5–47.0	2–32.0
Fumbles–lost	0–0	1–1
Turnovers	3	3
Penalties–yards	2–10	4–27

== Aftermath ==
The two teams received a then-record payout of about $285,000 each.

Oklahoma next played in the Orange Bowl in 1976; Tennessee waited three decades, returning in 1998.
