= 1967 Oklahoma Sooners football team =

American college football season

1967 Oklahoma Sooners football
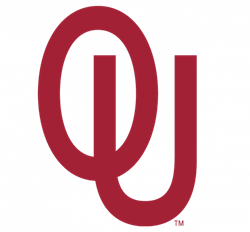

National Champion(Poling) Big 8 champion Orange Bowl champion

Orange Bowl, W 26–24 vs. Tennessee
- Conference: Big Eight Conference

Ranking
- Coaches: No. 3
- AP: No. 3
- Record: 10–1 (7–0 Big 8)
- Head coach: Chuck Fairbanks (1st season)
- Offensive coordinator: Barry Switzer (2nd season)
- Captain: Bob Kalsu
- Home stadium: Oklahoma Memorial Stadium

1967 Big Eight Conference football standings
	Conf.					Overall
Team	W		L		T	W		L		T
No. 3 Oklahoma $	7	–	0	–	0	10	–	1	–	0
Colorado	5	–	2	–	0	9	–	2	–	0
Kansas	5	–	2	–	0	5	–	5	–	0
Missouri	4	–	3	–	0	7	–	3	–	0
Nebraska	3	–	4	–	0	6	–	4	–	0
Oklahoma State	3	–	4	–	0	4	–	5	–	1
Iowa State	1	–	6	–	0	2	–	8	–	0
Kansas State	0	–	7	–	0	1	–	9	–	0
$ – Conference champion; Rankings from AP Poll

The 1967 Oklahoma Sooners football team represented the University of Oklahoma during the 1967 NCAA University Division football season. Led by first-year head coach Chuck Fairbanks, they played their home games at Oklahoma Memorial Stadium and competed as members of the Big Eight Conference. The Sooners won all seven conference games and finished the season with one loss to hated rival Texas in the Red River Shootout by two points. The Sooners upset number 9 Colorado on November 4 by a score of 23-0 in Norman to move into the top 10 ranking; they defeated Tennessee, 26–24, to win the Orange Bowl in Miami, Florida.

Entering his second season as head coach, 37-year-old Jim Mackenzie suffered a fatal heart attack at his Norman home in late April. Assistant coach Fairbanks, age 33, was promoted several days later.

== Schedule ==
Date	Opponent	Rank	Site	TV	Result	Attendance	Source
September 23	Washington State*		Oklahoma Memorial Stadium; Norman, OK		W 21–0	51,700	
September 30	Maryland*		Oklahoma Memorial Stadium; Norman, OK	ABC	W 35–0	46,215	
October 14	vs. Texas*		Cotton Bowl; Dallas, TX (Red River Shootout)		L 7–9	75,504	
October 21	at Kansas State		Memorial Stadium; Manhattan, KS		W 46–7	19,000	
October 28	at Missouri		Memorial Stadium; Columbia, MO (rivalry)		W 7–0	55,000	
November 4	No. 9 Colorado		Oklahoma Memorial Stadium; Norman, OK		W 23–0	62,000	
November 11	at Iowa State	No. 8	Clyde Williams Field; Ames, IA		W 52–14	14,000	
November 18	Kansas	No. 7	Oklahoma Memorial Stadium; Norman, OK		W 14–10	58,300	
November 23	at Nebraska	No. 5	Memorial Stadium; Lincoln, NE (rivalry)	ABC	W 21–14	60,048	
December 2	Oklahoma State	No. 3	Oklahoma Memorial Stadium; Norman, OK (Bedlam Series)		W 38–14	61,826	
January 1, 1968	vs. No. 2 Tennessee*	No. 3	Miami Orange Bowl; Miami, FL (Orange Bowl)	NBC	W 26–24	76,563	
*Non-conference game; Rankings from AP Poll released prior to the game

== Rankings ==
Ranking movements Legend: ██ Increase in ranking ██ Decrease in ranking — = Not ranked ( ) = First-place votes
	Week											
Poll	Pre	1	2	3	4	5	6	7	8	9	10	Final
AP	—	—	—	—	—	—	—	—	8	7	5 (1)	3

== Game summaries ==
=== Kansas ===
Kansas (4-4) at #7 Oklahoma (6-1)

Team	1	2	3	4	Total
Kansas	3	0	7	0	10
• Oklahoma	0	0	7	7	14

- Date: November 18
- Location: Oklahoma Memorial Stadium
- Game start: 1:30 p.m. CST
- Game attendance: 57,649
- Game weather: Sunny
- Dad's Day

=== Orange Bowl ===
Team	1	2	3	4	Total
• Oklahoma	7	12	0	7	26
Tennessee	0	0	14	10	24

- Date: January 1
- Location: Orange Bowl
- Game attendance: 76,563
- Television network: NBC

== Roster ==
1967 Oklahoma Sooners football team roster
Players
Coaches
Offense

Pos.	#	Name	Class
WB	33	Eddie Hinton	Jr
OT	77	Bob Kalsu	Sr
TB	22	Ron Shotts	Sr
RB		Steve Owens	So
QB	11	Bobby Warmack	Jr
E	82	Steve Zabel	So

Defense

Pos.	#	Name	Class
DL	66	Granville Liggins	Sr

Special teams

Pos.	#	Name	Class
PK	92	Mike Vachon	Jr

Head coach

- Chuck Fairbanks

Coordinators/assistant coaches

- Galen Hall (WR)
- Pat James
- Bill Michael (DE)
- Carl Nystrom
- Barry Switzer (OC)

Legend

- (C) Team captain
- (S) Suspended
- (I) Ineligible
- Injured
- Redshirt

Roster

== Awards ==
All-Big 8: OT Bob Kalsu, DE John Koller, NG Granville Liggins, RB Steve Owens, QB Bob Warmack

== NFL/AFL draft ==
The following players were drafted into the National Football League or American Football League following the season.

Round	Pick	Player	Position	NFL team
8	199	Bob Kalsu	Tackle	Buffalo Bills
10	256	Granville Liggins	Linebacker	Detroit Lions
11	292	Ron Shotts	Running back	Detroit Lions
