= Charlie Bradshaw (American football coach) =

American football player and coach (1923–1999)

Biographical details
- Born: December 31, 1923; Clio, Alabama, U.S.
- Died: June 3, 1999 (aged 75); Montgomery, Alabama, U.S.

Playing career
- 1946–1949: Kentucky

Coaching career (HC unless noted)
- 1954–1958: Kentucky (assistant)
- 1959–1961: Alabama (assistant)
- 1962–1968: Kentucky
- 1970: Texas A&M (assistant)
- 1971: Vanderbilt (assistant)
- 1976–1982: Troy State

Head coaching record
- Overall: 66–68–6

Accomplishments and honors

Championships
- 1 GSC (1976)

Awards
- GSC Coach of The Year (1976)

Charles Idus Bradshaw (December 31, 1923 – June 3, 1999) was an American college football player and coach. He served as the head football coach at the University of Kentucky from 1962 to 1968 and Troy State University—now known as Troy University—from 1976 to 1982, compiling a career head coaching record of 66–68–6.

== Coaching career ==
Bradshaw was an assistant coach at the University of Alabama under Bear Bryant and was on the staff that won the 1961 national championship.

At Kentucky Bradshaw inherited a program that had won a championship in 1950 under Bear Bryant and had been moderately well-regarded under Blanton Collier but posted a record of 25–41–4 (.386) in its previous seven seasons. Bradshaw's 1964 team was ranked #5 in the AP Poll after defeating #1 ranked Ole Miss on the road, 27–21, and beating Auburn, 20–0, for a 3–0 start, but the squad finished 5–5 after defeating Tennessee in its final game. Bradshaw's 1965 team defeated #10 Georgia, 28–10, and appeared bound for a bowl game, being ranked in the AP top ten for four weeks in September and November of that season. Bradshaw's wins in 1965 included games at Missouri, which capped the season with a Sugar Bowl victory and #6 national ranking in the final AP Poll, an upset of another bowl-bound team from Ole Miss, and another win over Georgia. The 1965 team was then set back when star quarterback Rick Norton suffered a broken leg. The Wildcats finished 6–4 and out of bowl contention. The remainder of Bradshaw's tenure at Kentucky was disappointing, although his final team did defeat a Missouri team that ended up winning the Gator Bowl and earning a #9 national ranking in the final AP Poll. The 1968 Kentucky team also defeated a ranked Oregon State team. Tackle Herschel Turner, tackle Sam Ball, halfback Rodger Bird, and quarterback Rick Norton were named first-team All Americans under Bradshaw at Kentucky.

In 1962, Bradshaw coached the infamous Thin Thirty at Kentucky. The varsity numbered 88 players when Bradshaw arrived in Lexington in January of that year, but by the start of the season in September there were only 30 players remaining on the squad. That season was profiled in Sports Illustrated and in a book published in August 2007, The Thin Thirty, by Shannon Ragland.

Bradshaw also helped recruit Nate Northington, who became the first scholarship African-American athlete to play in an SEC game when Kentucky faced Ole Miss on September 30, 1967.

Bradshaw was the last Kentucky coach to defeat a #1 ranked team until Rich Brooks led the Wildcats to a victory over #1 ranked LSU in 2007. He was also the last Kentucky head coach to defeat the University of Tennessee twice in Knoxville, and the last Kentucky coach to post two wins against Auburn University. Bradshaw assistants who went on to be head coaches included Dave Hart (Pittsburgh), Leeman Bennett (Atlanta Falcons, Tampa Bay Buccaneers), Bud Moore (Kansas), Homer Rice (Cincinnati, Rice, Cincinnati Bengals), Charley Pell (Jacksonville State, Clemson, Florida) and Chuck Knox (Los Angeles Rams, Buffalo Bills, Seattle Seahawks).

== Head coaching record ==
Year	Team	Overall	Conference	Standing	Bowl/playoffs
Kentucky Wildcats (Southeastern Conference) (1962–1968)
1962	Kentucky	3–5–2	2–3–1	T–7th	
1963	Kentucky	3–6–1	0–5–1	11th	
1964	Kentucky	5–5	4–2	T–2nd	
1965	Kentucky	6–4	3–3	T–6th	
1966	Kentucky	3–6–1	2–4	7th	
1967	Kentucky	2–8	1–6	8th	
1968	Kentucky	3–7	0–7	10th	
Kentucky:		25–41–4	12–30–2		
Troy State Trojans (Gulf South Conference) (1976–1982)
1976	Troy State	8–1–1	7–1	1st	
1977	Troy State	6–4	6–2	T–2nd	
1978	Troy State	8–2	5–2	T–3rd	
1979	Troy State	6–3–1	4–1–1	2nd	
1980	Troy State	8–2	4–2	3rd	
1981	Troy State	3–7	1–5	6th	
1982	Troy State	2–8	2–5	7th	
Troy State:		41–27–2	29–18–1		
Total:		66–68–6			
National championship Conference title Conference division title or championship game berth
