= Bill Peterson =

American football player, coach and college athletics administrator

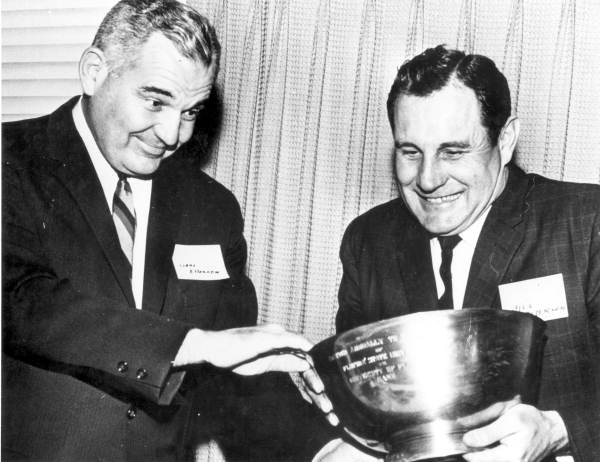
- Peterson (right) with University of Florida assistant coach Gene Ellenson in 1961

Biographical details
- Born: May 14, 1920; Toronto, Ohio, U.S.
- Died: August 5, 1993 (aged 73); Tallahassee, Florida, U.S.

Playing career
- 1945: Ohio Northern
- Position: End

Coaching career (HC unless noted)
- 1949–1950: Mansfield HS (OH) (assistant)
- 1951–1954: Mansfield HS (OH)
- 1955–1959: LSU (assistant)
- 1960–1970: Florida State
- 1971: Rice
- 1972–1973: Houston Oilers

Administrative career (AD unless noted)
- 1970–1971: Rice
- 1982–1985: UCF

Head coaching record
- Overall: 65–49–12 (college); 1–18 (NFL)

William E. Peterson (May 14, 1920 – August 5, 1993) was an American football player, coach, and college athletics administrator. His career included head coaching stops at Florida State University, Rice University and with the Houston Oilers of the National Football League (NFL). Considered one of the unique characters in college sports, Peterson is credited with bringing the pro passing game to college football. He is also known as the "Coach of Coaches", having tutored such coaches as Joe Gibbs, Bill Parcells, Bobby Bowden, Don James, Dan Henning, Ken Meyer and many others. Coach "Pete", as he was known, is also remembered for his odd usage of the English language. One of his more novel expressions was to have his team "pair off in groups of threes, then line up in a circle." Beyond his trials with syntax, Peterson is best remembered for bringing the Seminoles to the forefront of college football, using pro-style offenses and a much feared passing game.

== Youth and family life ==
Born in Toronto, Ohio, Bill Peterson was the eldest of six children. When his father died at the age of twelve, Peterson thought his dream of coaching had died as well. He recounted those feelings in his book, Building from the Start:

Visions of playing and someday coaching football would walk through my mind. I would bite my lip, fight back the tears, and roll my face into the pillow. "Bill Peterson", I would say, "You have no right to think about such things. They are for other people." Finally, I would sleep, but the dreams would fill my young mind. I'm glad they did.

Peterson persevered and ultimately earned a degree from Ohio Northern University in 1946. Playing end on the football team, Peterson was selected as a team captain. It was there that he met his wife, Marge, with whom he would be married for 52 years. Together, the couple had five sons. His second youngest son, Bill Jr., is currently the athletics director at Shorter University in Rome, Georgia. Peterson's brother, Jack Peterson, was the head football coach at Wofford College from 1971 until 1973.

== Coaching career ==
Peterson began his coaching career as a high school coach in Ohio, recording a 51–22–3 record before joining Paul Dietzel in 1955 as an assistant coach at LSU. Working as the Tigers offensive line coach, Peterson was considered an integral part of the coaching staff that led the Tigers to the 1958 national championship. Peterson's work at LSU resulted in his being named the head football coach at Florida State in December 1959.

According to Florida State's 2008 football media guide, "Florida State's arrival on the national map occurred during Peterson's eleven seasons as head coach." While at FSU, Peterson would be recognized for his offensive innovations as well as a number of significant firsts for that fledgling football program. Peterson became the first Seminole coach to beat the University of Florida, a 16–7 win at Doak Campbell Stadium. Peterson also coached the Seminoles to their first win ever at Florida Field. Under Peterson, Fred Biletnikoff would become the Seminoles first All-American. Peterson also recruited the Seminoles' first black football players, including J.T. Thomas, the first black individual to ever play varsity football at FSU. In recognition of his many accomplishments at Florida State, "H" style goal posts were added to the field at Doak Campbell Stadium in 2002 and have been named, "Pete's Posts".

[Peterson] also developed a high level of discipline on and off the field and an unusual number of pro quarterbacks. His wide-open passing offense was the antithesis of what most southern teams did, and his forward-thinking schemes were frequently copied by NFL coaches. Peterson can be credited with putting Florida State on the national map. He recruited from the talent-rich areas of Pennsylvania (Fred Biletnikoff) and Ohio (Steve Tensi) as Florida, unlike today, had a smaller population and a limited high school talent base. He brought in three-platoon football mimicking the famous "Chinese Bandits" teams he used as an assistant at LSU and gave them the designations of the "Chiefs", "Renegades", and "War Party". Despite the wide-open attack, the LSU influence was obvious and he built his early teams upon a smothering defense. He later augmented this with one of the first truly innovative passing offenses that brought visiting coaches from every corner of the country. He came up with the concept of the "hot receiver", never before seen, to counter blitzes, and FSU became known as an Independent primed to upset any team at any time.

Peterson served as head football coach and athletic director at Rice University during the 1971 season. Author Giles Tippette documented that 3–7–1 campaign in his 1973 book, Saturday's Children.

In 1972, Peterson joined a select group who have been head coaches in high school, at the major college level and in the National Football League (NFL). As has been the case with a number of successful college coaches, Peterson did not fare well as a head coach in the NFL; Bill Curry noted sympathetically on an NFL Network show about "NFL Coaches Who Belonged in College" (Peterson finished 5th on the list that was "led" by Bobby Petrino) that it seemed like his coach was intimidated by pro football. Peterson coached the Houston Oilers for the entire 1972 season and for five games in the 1973 season. The team finished 1–13 in 1972 and 0–5 in his five games in 1973. His career record in the NFL was 1–18, and his .053 winning percentage is the lowest for any coach after the NFL/AFL merger who coached at least one entire season. After leaving the Oilers, Peterson was the athletic director at the University of Central Florida from 1982 through 1985.

== Honors and legacy ==
Peterson is a member of the Florida Sports Hall of Fame, the Florida State University Sports Hall of Fame, the Ohio Northern Athletic Hall of Fame, the Gator Bowl Hall of Fame, the Mansfield, Ohio City Schools Hall of Fame and the Toronto, Ohio High School Athletic Hall of Fame.

Peterson's greatest legacy as a coach may be in the number of successful head coaches that got their start working under him. Each of the following worked for Peterson, many getting their first coaching jobs as a member of his staff. Together, these coaches claimed five Super Bowl wins and four major college football national championships. Since 2006, every head coach of college football's BCS national champion can be found in the Peterson coaching tree.

- Don James (Kent State, Washington)
- Bobby Bowden (West Virginia, Florida State)
- Vince Gibson (Kansas State, Louisville, Tulane)
- Al Conover (Rice)
- Gene McDowell (Central Florida)
- Joe Avezzano (Oregon State)
- Y C McNease (Idaho)
- John Coatta (Wisconsin, Mankato State)
- Joe Gibbs (Washington Redskins)
- Dan Henning (Atlanta Falcons, San Diego Chargers, Boston College)
- Bill Parcells (New York Giants, New England Patriots, New York Jets, Dallas Cowboys)
- Ken Meyer (San Francisco 49ers)
- Earle Bruce (Ohio State, Colorado State)
- Bobby Ross (Maryland, Georgia Tech, San Diego Chargers, Detroit Lions, Army)

== Head coaching record ==
=== College ===
Year	Team	Overall	Conference	Standing	Bowl/playoffs	Coaches^{#}	AP^{°}
Florida State Seminoles (NCAA University Division independent) (1960–1970)
1960	Florida State	3–6–1					
1961	Florida State	4–5–1					
1962	Florida State	4–3–3					
1963	Florida State	4–5–1					
1964	Florida State	9–1–1			W Gator	11	
1965	Florida State	4–5–1					
1966	Florida State	6–5			L Sun		
1967	Florida State	7–2–2			T Gator	15	
1968	Florida State	8–3			L Peach	14	
1969	Florida State	6–3–1					
1970	Florida State	7–4					
Florida State:		62–42–11					
Rice Owls (Southwest Conference) (1971)
1971	Rice	3–7–1	2–4–1	6th			
Rice:		3–7–1	2–4–1				
Total:		65–49–12					
^{#}Rankings from final Coaches Poll.; ^{°}Rankings from final AP Poll.

=== NFL ===
Team	Year	Regular season					Postseason			
Team	Year	Won	Lost	Ties	Win %	Finish	Won	Lost	Win %	Result
HOU	1972	1	13	0	.071	4th in AFC Central	–	–	–	–
HOU	1973	0	5	0	.000	4th in AFC Central	–	–	–	
HOU Total		1	18	0	.053		-	-	-	
