= 1967 Colorado Buffaloes football team =

American college football season

1967 Colorado Buffaloes football

Bluebonnet Bowl champion

Bluebonnet Bowl, W 31–21 vs. Miami (FL)
- Conference: Big Eight Conference

Ranking
- Coaches: No. 13
- Record: 9–2 (5–2 Big 8)
- Head coach: Eddie Crowder (5th season)
- MVP: Billy Harris
- Captains: John Farler; Kirk Tracy; Ron Scott
- Home stadium: Folsom Field

1967 Big Eight Conference football standings
	Conf.					Overall
Team	W		L		T	W		L		T
No. 3 Oklahoma $	7	–	0	–	0	10	–	1	–	0
Colorado	5	–	2	–	0	9	–	2	–	0
Kansas	5	–	2	–	0	5	–	5	–	0
Missouri	4	–	3	–	0	7	–	3	–	0
Nebraska	3	–	4	–	0	6	–	4	–	0
Oklahoma State	3	–	4	–	0	4	–	5	–	1
Iowa State	1	–	6	–	0	2	–	8	–	0
Kansas State	0	–	7	–	0	1	–	9	–	0
$ – Conference champion; Rankings from AP Poll

The 1967 Colorado Buffaloes football team represented the University of Colorado at Boulder as a member of the Big Eight Conference during the 1967 NCAA University Division football season. Led by fifth-year head coach Eddie Crowder, the Buffaloes compiled an overall record of 9–2 with a mark of 5–2 conference play, tying for second place in the Big 8. Colorado was invited to the Bluebonnet Bowl, where they beat the Miami Hurricanes.

Colorado played in the inaugural game at Autzen Stadium in Eugene, Oregon, a 17–13 victory over the Oregon Ducks. For the first time in six years, the Buffaloes defeated Nebraska, the conference champion the previous four years. Colorado did not win another game in the rivalry until 1986.

Senior safety Dick Anderson was a consensus All-American and played ten years with the Miami Dolphins.

== Schedule ==
Date	Opponent	Rank	Site	TV	Result	Attendance	Source
September 16	Baylor*	No. 10	Folsom Field; Boulder, CO		W 27–7	31,400	
September 23	at Oregon*	No. 9	Autzen Stadium; Eugene, OR	ABC	W 17–13	27,500	
October 7	Iowa State	No. 8	Folsom Field; Boulder, CO		W 34–0	38,500	
October 14	Missouri	No. 6	Folsom Field; Boulder, CO		W 23–9	44,517	
October 21	at Nebraska	No. 4	Memorial Stadium; Lincoln, NE (rivalry)		W 21–16	65,766	
October 28	Oklahoma State^{†}	No. 3	Folsom Field; Boulder, CO		L 7–10	42,200	
November 4	at Oklahoma	No. 9	Oklahoma Memorial Stadium; Norman, OK		L 0–23	62,000	
November 11	Kansas		Folsom Field; Boulder, CO		W 12–8	40,200	
November 18	at Kansas State		Memorial Stadium; Manhattan, KS (rivalry)		W 40–6	14,500	
November 25	at Air Force*		Falcon Stadium; Colorado Springs, CO		W 33–0	28,835	
December 23	vs. Miami (FL)*		Rice Stadium; Houston, TX (Bluebonnet Bowl)	ABC	W 31–21	30,156	
*Non-conference game; ^{†}Homecoming; Rankings from AP Poll released prior to the game

== NFL draft ==
Seven Buffaloes were selected in the 1968 NFL/AFL draft, the second common draft, which lasted seventeen rounds (462 selections).

Player	Position	Round	Overall	Franchise
Dick Anderson	Safety	3	73	Miami Dolphins
Larry Plantz	Wide receiver	12	326	Oakland Raiders
Bill Harris	Running back	13	329	Atlanta Falcons
Charlie Greer	Defensive back	13	330	Denver Broncos
John Farler	Wide receiver	14	380	Green Bay Packers
Wilmer Cooks	Running back	15	384	New Orleans Saints
Frank Bosch	Defensive tackle	17	446	Washington Redskins
