= 1967 Kentucky Wildcats football team =

American college football season

1967 Kentucky Wildcats football
- Conference: Southeastern Conference
- Record: 2–8 (1–6 SEC)
- Head coach: Charlie Bradshaw (6th season)
- Home stadium: McLean Stadium

1967 Southeastern Conference football standings
	Conf.					Overall
Team	W		L		T	W		L		T
No. 2 Tennessee $	6	–	0	–	0	9	–	2	–	0
No. 8 Alabama	5	–	1	–	0	8	–	2	–	1
Georgia	4	–	2	–	0	7	–	4	–	0
Florida	4	–	2	–	0	6	–	4	–	0
Ole Miss	4	–	2	–	1	6	–	4	–	1
LSU	3	–	2	–	1	7	–	3	–	1
Auburn	3	–	3	–	0	6	–	4	–	0
Kentucky	1	–	6	–	0	2	–	8	–	0
Vanderbilt	0	–	6	–	0	2	–	7	–	1
Mississippi State	0	–	6	–	0	1	–	9	–	0
$ – Conference champion; Georgia's game against Clemson and Vanderbilt's game against Tulane counted in the conference standings.; Rankings from AP Poll

The 1967 Kentucky Wildcats football team were an American football team that represented the University of Kentucky as a member of the Southeastern Conference during the 1967 NCAA University Division football season. In their sixth season under head coach Charlie Bradshaw, the team compiled a 2–8 record (1–6 in the SEC).

On September 30, Kentucky running back Nathaniel "Nate" Northington became the first African-American scholarship athlete to play in an Southeastern Conference game in the Wildcats' home game against Ole Miss. (Note: Northington was not the first African American to play at the varsity level in the SEC, although he was the first to do so on a scholarship. The conference's first African American varsity athlete was Stephen Martin, a baseball walk-on at Tulane, who made his varsity debut in 1966 (1965–66 school year), which was Tulane's last season as an SEC member.) His debut was bittersweet as it came the day after the death of Greg Page, an African-American defensive end who had arrived at UK alongside Northington. Page died from complications of a paralyzing spinal cord injury suffered in an August 22 practice. Northington only played for three minutes before suffering a separated shoulder, and the Wildcats would lose 26–13.

== Schedule ==
Date	Opponent	Site	Result	Attendance	Source
September 23	at Indiana*	Seventeenth Street Football Stadium; Bloomington, IN (rivalry)	L 10–12	42,311	
September 30	Ole Miss	McLean Stadium; Lexington, KY	L 13–26	33,000	
October 7	Auburn	Cliff Hare Stadium; Auburn, AL	L 7–48	24,962–28,000	
October 14	Virginia Tech*	McLean Stadium; Lexington, KY	L 14–24	23,000	
October 21	at LSU	Tiger Stadium; Baton Rouge, LA	L 7–30	66,000	
October 28	No. 6 Georgia	McLean Stadium; Lexington, KY	L 7–31	28,000	
November 4	West Virginia*	McLean Stadium; Lexington, KY	W 22–7	30,000	
November 11	at Vanderbilt	Dudley Field; Nashville, TN (rivalry)	W 12–7	18,942	
November 18	at Florida	Florida Field; Gainesville, FL (rivalry)	L 12–28	50,833	
November 25	No. 2 Tennessee	McLean Stadium; Lexington, KY (rivalry)	L 7–17	31,500	
*Non-conference game; Rankings from AP Poll released prior to the game

== Roster ==
1967 Kentucky Wildcats football team roster
Players
Coaches
Offense

Pos.	#	Name	Class
QB	19	Dave Bair	So
OE	81	Tom Anderson	Sr
QB	14	Terry Beadles	Sr
FB	43	Dick Beard	Jr
G	60	Mike Beirne	Sr
OE	89	Chuck Blackburn	So
FB	41	Don Britton	Sr

Defense

Pos.	#	Name	Class
S	21	Bobby Abbott	So
DHB	31	Al Borne	So
DG	62	Mike Boulware	So
[[American football positions|]]

Special teams

Pos.	#	Name	Class
[[American football positions|]]
[[American football positions|]]

Head coach

- Charles (Charlie) Bradshaw

Coordinators/assistant coaches

Legend

- (C) Team captain
- (S) Suspended
- (I) Ineligible
- Injured
- Redshirt
