= 1967 Tennessee Volunteers football team =

American college football season

1967 Tennessee Volunteers football

National champion (Litkenhous) SEC champion

Orange Bowl, L 24–26 vs. Oklahoma
- Conference: Southeastern Conference

Ranking
- Coaches: No. 2
- AP: No. 2
- Record: 9–2 (6–0 SEC)
- Head coach: Doug Dickey (4th season)
- Home stadium: Neyland Stadium

1967 Southeastern Conference football standings
	Conf.					Overall
Team	W		L		T	W		L		T
No. 2 Tennessee $	6	–	0	–	0	9	–	2	–	0
No. 8 Alabama	5	–	1	–	0	8	–	2	–	1
Georgia	4	–	2	–	0	7	–	4	–	0
Florida	4	–	2	–	0	6	–	4	–	0
Ole Miss	4	–	2	–	1	6	–	4	–	1
LSU	3	–	2	–	1	7	–	3	–	1
Auburn	3	–	3	–	0	6	–	4	–	0
Kentucky	1	–	6	–	0	2	–	8	–	0
Vanderbilt	0	–	6	–	0	2	–	7	–	1
Mississippi State	0	–	6	–	0	1	–	9	–	0
$ – Conference champion; Georgia's game against Clemson and Vanderbilt's game against Tulane counted in the conference standings.; Rankings from AP Poll

The 1967 Tennessee Volunteers football team represented the University of Tennessee in the 1967 NCAA University Division football season. Playing as a member of the Southeastern Conference (SEC), the team was led by head coach Doug Dickey, in his fourth year, and played their home games at Neyland Stadium in Knoxville, Tennessee. They finished the season with a record of nine wins and two losses (9–2 overall, 6–0 in the SEC) as SEC Champions and with a loss against Oklahoma in the Orange Bowl. The Volunteers' offense scored 283 points while the defense allowed 141 points. At season's end, Tennessee was recognized as national champions by Litkenhous. Lester McClain became the first African American player in the program.

== Schedule ==
Date	Opponent	Rank	Site	TV	Result	Attendance	Source
September 16	at No. 8 UCLA*	No. 9	Los Angeles Memorial Coliseum; Los Angeles, CA		L 16–20	66,708	
September 30	Auburn		Neyland Stadium; Knoxville, TN (rivalry)		W 27–13	54,113–54,566	
October 14	Georgia Tech*		Neyland Stadium; Knoxville, TN (rivalry)	ABC	W 24–13	55,119	
October 21	at No. 6 Alabama	No. 7	Legion Field; Birmingham, AL (Third Saturday in October)		W 24–13	71,849	
October 28	LSU	No. 4	Neyland Stadium; Knoxville, TN		W 17–14	54,596	
November 4	at Tampa*	No. 3	Tampa Stadium; Tampa, FL		W 38–0	26,500	
November 11	Tulane*^{†}	No. 2	Neyland Stadium; Knoxville, TN		W 35–14	54,828	
November 18	vs. Ole Miss	No. 2	Memphis Memorial Stadium; Memphis, TN (rivalry)		W 20–7	50,881	
November 25	at Kentucky	No. 2	McLean Stadium; Lexington, KY (rivalry)		W 17–7	31,500	
December 2	Vanderbilt	No. 2	Neyland Stadium; Knoxville, TN (rivalry)		W 41–14	49,787	
January 1	vs. No. 3 Oklahoma	No. 2	Miami Orange Bowl; Miami, FL (Orange Bowl)	NBC	L 24–26	77,993	
*Non-conference game; ^{†}Homecoming; Rankings from AP Poll released prior to the game

== Personnel ==
1967 Tennessee Volunteers football team roster
Players			Coaches
Offense: Pos. / # / Name / Class; QB / 16 / Dewey Warren / Sr	Defense: Pos. / # / Name / Class; LB / 57 / Steve Kiner / So	Special teams: Pos. / # / Name / Class	Head coach: Doug Dickey; Coordinators/assistant coaches Legend: (C) Team captain; (S) Suspended; (I) Ineligible; Injured; Redshirt

== Team players drafted into the NFL ==
Player	Position	Round	Pick	NFL club
Bob Johnson	Center	1	2	Cincinnati Bengals
Walter Chadwick	Running back	6	164	Green Bay Packers
John Boynton	Tackle	7	172	Miami Dolphins
Elliot Gammage	Tight end	8	209	San Diego Chargers
Joe Graham	End	15	394	Philadelphia Eagles
Charles Fulton	Tailback	16	413	Boston Patriots
