= 1967 Alabama Crimson Tide football team =

American college football season

1967 Alabama Crimson Tide football

Cotton Bowl Classic, L 16–20 vs. Texas A&M
- Conference: Southeastern Conference

Ranking
- Coaches: No. 7
- AP: No. 8
- Record: 8–2–1 (5–1 SEC)
- Head coach: Bear Bryant (10th season)
- Captains: Ken Stabler; Bobby Johns
- Home stadium: Denny Stadium; Legion Field; Ladd Stadium

1967 Southeastern Conference football standings
	Conf.					Overall
Team	W		L		T	W		L		T
No. 2 Tennessee $	6	–	0	–	0	9	–	2	–	0
No. 8 Alabama	5	–	1	–	0	8	–	2	–	1
Georgia	4	–	2	–	0	7	–	4	–	0
Florida	4	–	2	–	0	6	–	4	–	0
Ole Miss	4	–	2	–	1	6	–	4	–	1
LSU	3	–	2	–	1	7	–	3	–	1
Auburn	3	–	3	–	0	6	–	4	–	0
Kentucky	1	–	6	–	0	2	–	8	–	0
Vanderbilt	0	–	6	–	0	2	–	7	–	1
Mississippi State	0	–	6	–	0	1	–	9	–	0
$ – Conference champion; Georgia's game against Clemson and Vanderbilt's game against Tulane counted in the conference standings.; Rankings from AP Poll

The 1967 Alabama Crimson Tide football team (variously "Alabama", "UA" or "Bama") represented the University of Alabama in the 1967 NCAA University Division football season. It was the Crimson Tide's 73rd overall and 34th season as a member of the Southeastern Conference (SEC). The team was led by head coach Bear Bryant, in his 10th year, and played their home games at Denny Stadium in Tuscaloosa, Legion Field in Birmingham and Ladd Stadium in Mobile, Alabama. They finished season with eight wins, two losses and one tie (8–2–1 overall, 5–1 in the SEC) and with a loss against Texas A&M in the Cotton Bowl Classic.

During the spring practice sessions, five African American students attempted to walk-on to the football team. Two of the five, Dock Rone and Andrew Pernell participated in the annual A-Day Game. Although none of the five made it to the varsity squad, their participation as part of the team marked the beginnings of the desegregation of the football program that culminated in the signing of Wilbur Jackson to an athletic scholarship in 1970.

Alabama opened the season ranked #2, but tied unranked Florida State at Birmingham in a game that snapped a 17-game winning streak and surprised many pundits. They rebounded from the tie with victories over Southern Miss in their annual Mobile game, Ole Miss in their first conference game and Vanderbilt in their first road game of the season. In their fifth game against Tennessee, Alabama was defeated 24–13 at Legion Field. The defeat ended a 25-game unbeaten streak for the Crimson Tide that dated back to the 1965 season and was the first for the Volunteers over Alabama since their 1960 season.

After their loss to Tennessee, Alabama again rebounded and won their final five regular season games. After they defeated Clemson at Memorial Stadium, they returned to Tuscaloosa where they defeated Mississippi State on homecoming. The Crimson Tide next defeated LSU at Tiger Stadium, South Carolina in Tuscaloosa, and Auburn in the Iron Bowl after Ken Stabler had his famous, 47-yard "run in the mud" touchdown to win the game. In the January that followed, Alabama lost to Texas A&M in the Cotton Bowl Classic.

== Schedule ==
Date	Opponent	Rank	Site	TV	Result	Attendance
September 23	Florida State*	No. 2	Legion Field; Birmingham, AL		T 37–37	71,299
September 30	Southern Miss*	No. 9	Ladd Stadium; Mobile, AL		W 25–3	38,285
October 7	Ole Miss	No. 9	Legion Field; Birmingham, AL (rivalry)	ABC	W 21–7	69,281
October 14	at Vanderbilt	No. 7	Dudley Field; Nashville, TN		W 35–21	33,407
October 21	No. 7 Tennessee	No. 6	Legion Field; Birmingham, AL (Third Saturday in October)		L 13–24	71,849
October 28	at Clemson*		Memorial Stadium; Clemson, SC (rivalry)		W 13–10	49,596
November 4	Mississippi State^{†}		Denny Stadium; Tuscaloosa, AL (rivalry)		W 13–0	58,059
November 11	at LSU		Tiger Stadium; Baton Rouge, LA (rivalry)	ABC	W 7–6	68,500
November 18	South Carolina*		Denny Stadium; Tuscaloosa, AL		W 17–0	46,105
December 2	vs. Auburn	No. 8	Legion Field; Birmingham, AL (Iron Bowl)		W 7–3	71,200
January 1, 1968	vs. Texas A&M*	No. 8	Cotton Bowl; Dallas, TX (Cotton Bowl Classic)	CBS	L 16–20	69,723–71,200
*Non-conference game; ^{†}Homecoming; Rankings from AP Poll released prior to the game

== Desegregation ==
Although the University was officially desegregated in summer 1963, full integration of the athletic teams did not occur at that time. By spring 1967, the athletic program was warned by the Office of Education that the lack of African Americans under athletic scholarship was a violation of Title VI of the Civil Rights Act of 1964. In February 1967, Dock Rone, an African American student enrolled at the University from Montgomery, met with coach Bryant about potentially trying to make the football team as a walk-on. At that time Bryant believed a non-scholarship, African American walk-on would help pave the way to complete integration of the football team.

On April 1, the football team opened their spring practice, and at that time Rone became the first African American to wear the Alabama uniform. At that time, an additional four African American students reported to practice, but were unable to participate at that time as they had not yet been academically cleared to play. These four other African American students that reported were Melvin Leverett of Prichard, Arthur Dunning of Mobile, Andrew Pernell of Bessemer and Jerome Tucker of Birmingham. By the second practice all except for Tucker were declared academically eligible to compete on the football squad and joined the team on April 3.

Throughout spring practice, Rone played as an offensive lineman and Leverett, Dunning and Pernell played as backs. On May 5, Rone and Pernell participated in the annual A-Day Game and became the first African American players to play at Denny Stadium as members of the Crimson Tide football team. Although Rone was on track to potentially become the first African American player on scholarship at Alabama, in the summer that followed family problems forced him to leave school. Three years later, Wilbur Jackson became the first African American to sign and play under athletic scholarship for the Alabama football team.

== Game summaries ==
=== Florida State ===
Team	1	2	3	4	Total
Florida State	14	10	3	10	37
#2 Alabama	15	7	0	15	37

- Date: September 23
- Location: Legion Field
  Birmingham, Alabama
- Game attendance: 71,299

To open the 1967 season, Alabama played the Florida State Seminoles to a 37–37 tie and ended a 17-game unbeaten and untied streak that stretched back to their 1965 season. The Seminoles opened with a pair of early touchdowns first on an 11-yard Kim Hammond pass to Ron Sellers and next on a 75-yard Walt Sumner punt return for a 14–0 lead. The Crimson Tide then responded with touchdowns on a two-yard Ken Stabler run and a 51-yard Stabler pass to Dennis Homan coupled with a successful two-point conversion for a 15–14 lead at the end of the first quarter. In the second quarter, Florida State scored first on a 27-yard Grant Guthrie field goal followed by Alabama with an 11-yard Ed Morgan touchdown run. The Seminoles then scored on a 13-yard Hammond touchdown pass to Larry Green for a 24–22 halftime lead.

After Florida State scored the only third quarter points in the third quarter on a 38-yard Guthrie field goal, both teams traded fourth quarter points for the 37–37 tie. After Stabler threw a 17-yard touchdown pass to Homan, the Seminoles responded with a 23-yard Guthrie field goal. Then in the final minutes of the game, Alabama scored their final points on a three-yard Morgan run only to have Florida State tie the game at 37 with their eight-yard touchdown pass to Bill Moremen.

=== Southern Miss ===
Team	1	2	3	4	Total
Southern Miss	0	3	0	0	3
• #9 Alabama	0	7	7	11	25

- Date: September 30
- Location: Ladd Stadium
  Mobile, Alabama
- Game attendance: 38,285

After their tie against Florida State, Alabama dropped from the No. 2 to the No. 9 position in the AP Poll prior to their game against Southern Miss. In their annual game played at Mobile, Alabama defeated the Southerners 25–3 behind three Ken Stabler touchdown passes to Dennis Homan. After a scoreless first quarter, Stabler threw his first touchdown to Homan on a 20-yard pass and then Southern Miss scored their only points on a 30-yard Ihor Kondrat field goal that made the halftime score 7–3. Stabler then threw touchdowns to Homan from six-yards in the third and 33-yards in the fourth. Steve Davis then converted a 30-yard field goal late that made the final score 25–3.

=== Ole Miss ===
Team	1	2	3	4	Total
Ole Miss	0	0	0	7	7
• #9 Alabama	0	7	7	7	21

- Date: October 7
- Location: Legion Field
  Birmingham, Alabama
- Game attendance: 69,281

In their conference opener against Ole Miss, Alabama defeated the Rebels 21–7 before a nationally televised audience at Birmingham. After a scoreless first quarter, the Crimson Tide took a 7–0 halftime lead when Ken Stabler threw an 11-yard touchdown pass to Dennis Homan. Stabler then scored on an eight-yard run in the second and Ed Morgan on a one-yard run that capped an 88-yard drive in the fourth for a 21–0 lead. Down by three touchdowns, the Rebels scored their only points in the fourth when backup quarterback Terry Collier threw a 23-yard touchdown pass to Mac Haik. In the game, Homan led all receivers with 84 yards on eight catches for Alabama and Ole Miss lost five fumbles.

=== Vanderbilt ===
Team	1	2	3	4	Total
• #7 Alabama	14	3	11	7	35
Vanderbilt	0	14	0	7	21

- Date: October 14
- Location: Dudley Field
  Nashville, Tennessee
- Game attendance: 33,407

After their victory over Ole Miss, Alabama moved up into the No. 7 position in the AP Poll prior to their game against Vanderbilt. In an offensive shootout against the Commodores, Alabama won 35–21 at Nashville. The Crimson Tide took an early 14–0 lead with a pair of Ken Stabler touchdowns in the first quarter. The first came on a 61-yard pass to Dennis Homan and the second on a one-yard run. Vanderbilt responded in the second quarter with a pair of David Strong touchdowns that tied the game 14–14. The first came on a seven-yard run and the second on a 13-yard pass from Roger May. The Crimson Tide then responded with a 59-yard drive, capped with a 21-yard Steve Davis field goal that gave them a 17–14 halftime lead.

After a 31-yard Davis field goal extended the Alabama lead to 20–14, Stabler threw a 15-yard touchdown pass to Homan. A successful two-point conversion on a Pete Jilleba run followed, and the Crimson Tide extended their lead to 28–14 at the end of the third quarter. The game then closed with each squad scoring a touchdown in the fourth quarter. Alabama scored first on a two-yard Joe Kelley run followed by a seven-yard May pass to Robert Goodridge by the Commodores that made the final score 35–21.

=== Tennessee ===
Third Saturday in October

Team	1	2	3	4	Total
• #7 Tennessee	7	0	10	7	24
#6 Alabama	7	0	0	6	13

- Date: October 21
- Location: Legion Field
  Birmingham, Alabama
- Game attendance: 71,849

After their victory over Vanderbilt, Alabama moved into the No. 6 position in the AP Poll prior to their game against Tennessee. Against the Volunteers, the Crimson Tide lost their first game since the 1965 season and ended a 25-game unbeaten streak with this 24–13 loss. After Walter Chadwick scored on a one-yard touchdown run for the Vols, Alabama responded with an eight-yard Ken Stabler touchdown that tied the game 7–7 at the end of the first quarter. The score remained tied at the half after a scoreless second quarter.

Tennessee then took a 17–7 lead in the third quarter on an 11-yard Chadwick touchdown pass to Ken DeLong and a 47-yard Karl Kremser field goal. Alabama responded with their final points early in the fourth quarter on a one-yard Ed Morgan touchdown run, but a Stabler pass was later intercepted by Albert Dorsey and returned 31-yards for a touchdown and a 24–13 Vols victory. The Tennessee win was also their first over the Crimson Tide since the 1960 season. In the game, Stabler threw five interceptions.

=== Clemson ===
Team	1	2	3	4	Total
• Alabama	7	6	0	0	13
Clemson	3	0	0	7	10

- Date: October 28
- Location: Memorial Stadium
  Clemson, South Carolina
- Game attendance: 49,596

As a result of their loss against Tennessee, Alabama dropped completely out of the AP Poll prior to their game against Clemson. In their only non-conference road game of the season, the Crimson Tide narrowly defeated the Tigers of the Atlantic Coast Conference 13–10 at Memorial Stadium. Alabama took a 7–0 lead in the first quarter on a one-yard run Ed Morgan, and Clemson responded with a 30-yard Steedley Candler field goal that made the score 7–3 at the end of the first. Alabama then scored their final points of the game on a pair of Steve Davis field goals in the second that made the halftime score 13–3. After a scoreless third, Clemson made the final score 13–10 with a one-yard Buddy Gore touchdown run in the fourth quarter.

=== Mississippi State ===
Team	1	2	3	4	Total
Mississippi State	0	0	0	0	0
• Alabama	0	3	7	3	13

- Date: November 4
- Location: Denny Stadium
  Tuscaloosa, Alabama
- Game attendance: 58,059

On homecoming in Tuscaloosa, the Crimson Tide shutout the Mississippi State Bulldogs 13–0 at Tuscaloosa. After a scoreless first quarter, Steve Davis gave Alabama a 3–0 halftime lead with his 24-yard field goal in the second quarter. The Crimson Tide then closed the game with a one-yard Tommy Wade touchdown run in the third and a 21-yard field goal in the fourth for the 13–0 victory.

=== LSU ===
Team	1	2	3	4	Total
• Alabama	0	0	0	7	7
LSU	0	0	0	6	6

- Date: November 11
- Location: Tiger Stadium
  Baton Rouge, Louisiana
- Game attendance: 68,500

Although Steve Davis missed three field goals for Alabama in the game, the Crimson Tide defeated the LSU Tigers 7–6 at Tiger Stadium. After three shutout quarters, Alabama scored their only points early in the fourth on a one-yard Ed Morgan touchdown run for a 7–0 lead. Tommy Allen then scored the Tigers only points later in the quarter with his four-yard run. However, Roy Hurd missed the extra point attempt and LSU lost 7–6.

=== South Carolina ===
Team	1	2	3	4	Total
South Carolina	0	0	0	0	0
• Alabama	0	10	7	0	17

- Date: November 18
- Location: Denny Stadium
  Tuscaloosa, Alabama
- Game attendance: 46,105

In the final Tuscaloosa game of the season, Alabama shutout the South Carolina Gamecocks 17–0 at Denny Stadium. After a scoreless first quarter, the Crimson Tide took a 10–0 halftime lead on a 24-yard Steve Davis field goal and a 38-yard Ken Stabler pass to Dennis Homan. Tommy Wade then made the final score 17–0 with his one-yard touchdown run in the third quarter.

=== Auburn ===
Iron Bowl

Team	1	2	3	4	Total
Auburn	0	0	3	0	3
• #8 Alabama	0	0	0	7	7

- Date: December 2
- Location: Legion Field
  Birmingham, Alabama
- Game attendance: 71,200

In the annual Iron Bowl game, Alabama defeated the Auburn Tigers 7–3 in rainy conditions at Legion Field behind Ken Stabler's 47-yard "Run in the Mud" for the game's only touchdown in the fourth quarter. The only other points in the game came in the third quarter on a 38-yard John Riley field goal for the Tigers.

=== Texas A&M ===
Cotton Bowl Classic

Team	1	2	3	4	Total
• Texas A&M	7	6	7	0	20
#8 Alabama	7	3	6	0	16

- Date: January 1, 1968
- Location: Cotton Bowl
  Dallas
- Game attendance: 73,800

After Texas A&M upset Alabama 20–16 in the Cotton Bowl Classic, Bear Bryant carried the Aggies head coach Gene Stallings off the field to celebrate the victory as he was both a former player and assistant coach under him Bryant. After Alabama scored first on an eight-yard Ken Stabler touchdown run, A&M responded with a 13-yard Edd Hargett touchdown pass to Larry Stegent that tied the game 7–7 at the end of the first quarter. In the second quarter, the Crimson Tide scored first on a 34-yard Steve Davis field goal and the Aggies followed with a seven-yard Hargett touchdown pass to Tommy Maxwell that made the halftime score 13–10. Each team then scored their final points in the third quarter. A&M scored first on a 20-yard Wendell Housley touchdown run followed by Stabler on an eight-yard touchdown run that made the final score 20–16.

== NFL draft ==
Several players that were varsity lettermen from the 1967 squad were drafted into the National Football League (NFL) between the 1968 and 1969 drafts. These players included the following:

Year	Round	Overall	Player name	Position	NFL team
1968 NFL/AFL draft	1	20	Dennis Homan	Wide receiver	Dallas Cowboys
1968 NFL/AFL draft	2	52	Ken Stabler	Quarterback	Oakland Raiders
1968 NFL/AFL draft	12	320	Bobby Johns	Defensive back	Kansas City Chiefs
1969 NFL/AFL draft	10	260	Mike Hall	Linebacker	New York Jets
1969 NFL/AFL draft	16	413	William Davis	Linebacker	Oakland Raiders

== Freshman squad ==
Prior to the 1972 NCAA University Division football season, NCAA rules prohibited freshmen from participating on the varsity team, and as such many schools fielded freshmen teams. The Alabama freshmen squad was led by coach Clem Gryska for the 1967 season and finished with a record of three wins and one loss (3–1). The Baby Tide opened their season with a 34–14 victory over Mississippi State at Scott Field. On the first play of the game, Frank Mann threw a 63-yard touchdown pass to George Ranager for a 6–0 lead, and later in the first Roger Crowson scored on a 23-yard run that extended the Baby Tide lead to 13–0. State then scored their first touchdown in the final 0:30 of the quarter on a nine-yard Joe Joy touchdown catch that made the score 13–6. After a scoreless second, in the third Bill Ragle scored for Alabama on a 15-yard run followed by Cam Walker on a two-yard run that extended their lead to 27–6. The game came to a close with a pair of fourth-quarter touchdowns. First Tommy Weigand scored on a six-yard run for Alabama and this was followed with a 53-yard David Smith touchdown pass for State that made the final score 34–14.

In their second game, the Alabama freshmen lost their only game of the season at home against Ole Miss 21–2. After a scoreless first quarter, the Rebels took a 7–0 lead in the second on a 31-yard pass from Don Farrar to Floyd Franks. Ole Miss still led into the fourth quarter when Alabama scored their only points on a safety when Gene Gellerstedt blocked a Rebels punt out of the endzone. Randy Reed responded with the final two touchdowns of the game first on a recovered fumble and the second on a one-yard run for the 21–2 victory.

At Knoxville, Alabama defeated the Tennessee freshmen 7–3 for their third consecutive victory over the Volunteers. George Hunt scored for the Vols at the end of the second quarter on a 33-yard field goal and Alabama responded in the third on a 55-yard Benny Rippetoe touchdown pass to George Ranager for the 7–3 victory. At Cliff Hare Stadium, Alabama scored all of their points in a span of 1:34 of the first quarter and held on to win 14–6 at Auburn. The Baby Tide scored first on a 55-yard Benny Rippetoe touchdown pass to George Ranager and was followed with a block of a Roy Davis punt by Rod Steakley that was returned by Hal Willcutt for a 14–0 Alabama lead. Mac Crawford scored the only points for Auburn late in the fourth quarter on his one-yard run that made the final score 14–6.

== Personnel ==
=== Varsity letter winners ===
Player	Hometown	Position
Randy Barron	Dadeville, Alabama	Defensive tackle
David Bedwell	Cedar Bluff, Alabama	Defensive back
Paul Boschung	Tuscaloosa, Alabama	Defensive tackle
Richard Brewer	Sylacauga, Alabama	Split end
Kent Busbee	Meridian, Mississippi	Defensive back
Jimmy Chambers	Fort Payne, Alabama	Center
David Chatwood	Fairhope, Alabama	Fullback
Bob Childs	Montgomery, Alabama	Linebacker
Steve Davis	Columbus, Georgia	Placekicker
William Davis	Birmingham, Alabama	Tackle
Mike Dean	Decatur, Georgia	Defensive back
Dennis Dixon	Orange, California	Tight end
Jim Duke	Columbus, Georgia	Defensive tackle
Danny Ford	Gadsden, Alabama	Offensive tackle
Mike Ford	Tuscaloosa, Alabama	Defensive end
Conrad Fowler	Columbiana, Alabama	Split end
Richard Grammer	Hartselle, Alabama	Center
Mike Hall	Tarrant, Alabama	Linebacker
Norris Hamer	Tarrant, Alabama	Defensive end
Allen Harpole	Columbus, Mississippi	Defensive guard
Charles Harris	Mobile, Alabama	Defensive end
Robert Higginbotham	Hueytown, Alabama	Defensive back
Dennis Homan	Muscle Shoals, Alabama	Split end
Hunter Husband	Nashville, Tennessee	Tight end
Pete Jilleba	Madison, New Jersey	Fullback
Bobby Johns	Birmingham, Alabama	Defensive back
Billy Johnson	Selma, Alabama	Center
Joe Kelley	Ozark, Alabama	Quarterback
Dudley Kerr	Reform, Alabama	Placekicker
Terry Killgore	Annandale, Virginia	Center
Kenny Martin	Hemet, California	Fullback
Ed Morgan	Hattiesburg, Mississippi	Fullback
Stan Moss	Birmingham, Alabama	Left end
Wayne Owen	Gadsden, Alabama	Linebacker
Eddie Propst	Birmingham, Alabama	Defensive back
Mike Reilly	Mobile, Alabama	Guard
John Reitz	Morristown, Tennessee	Defensive end
Eddie Rogers	Bessemer, Alabama	Linebacker
Nathan Rustin	Phenix City, Alabama	Defensive tackle
Alvin Samples	Tarrant, Alabama	Offensive guard
Billy Scroggins	Jacksonville, Florida	Split end
Don Shankles	Fort Payne, Alabama	End
John Sides	Tuskegee, Alabama	Defensive tackle
Tom Somerville	White Station, Tennessee	Offensive guard
Ken Stabler	Foley, Alabama	Quarterback
Bruce Stephens	Thomasville, Alabama	Guard
Donnie Sutton	Blountsville, Alabama	Split end
Bobby Swafford	Heflin, Alabama	Split end
Richard Thompson	Thomasville, Alabama	Halfback
Tommy Wade	Dothan, Alabama	Defensive back
Perry Willis	Dadeville, Alabama	Split end

=== Coaching staff ===
Name	Position	Seasons at Alabama	Alma mater
Bear Bryant	Head coach	10	Alabama (1936)
Sam Bailey	Assistant coach	10	Ouachita Baptist (1949)
Ken Donahue	Assistant coach	4	Tennessee (1951)
Pat Dye	Assistant coach	3	Georgia (1962)
Jim Goostree	Assistant coach	11	Tennessee (1952)
Clem Gryska	Assistant coach	8	Alabama (1948)
Dude Hennessey	Assistant coach	8	Kentucky (1955)
Carney Laslie	Assistant coach	11	Alabama (1934)
Ken Meyer	Assistant coach	5	Denison (1950)
Mal Moore	Assistant coach	4	Alabama (1962)
Dee Powell	Assistant coach	5	Texas A&M (1957)
Charley Richards	Assistant coach	2	Livingston State (1950)
Hayden Riley	Assistant coach	10	Alabama (1948)
Tom Rogers	Assistant coach	2	Delta State (1956)
Jack Rutledge	Assistant coach	2	Alabama (1962)
Jimmy Sharpe	Assistant coach	5	Alabama (1962)
Richard Williamson	Assistant coach	4	Alabama (1963)
