= 1967 Nebraska Cornhuskers football team =

American college football season

1967 Nebraska Cornhuskers football
- Conference: Big Eight Conference
- Record: 6–4 (3–4 Big 8)
- Head coach: Bob Devaney (6th season)
- Home stadium: Memorial Stadium

1967 Big Eight Conference football standings
	Conf.					Overall
Team	W		L		T	W		L		T
No. 3 Oklahoma $	7	–	0	–	0	10	–	1	–	0
Colorado	5	–	2	–	0	9	–	2	–	0
Kansas	5	–	2	–	0	5	–	5	–	0
Missouri	4	–	3	–	0	7	–	3	–	0
Nebraska	3	–	4	–	0	6	–	4	–	0
Oklahoma State	3	–	4	–	0	4	–	5	–	1
Iowa State	1	–	6	–	0	2	–	8	–	0
Kansas State	0	–	7	–	0	1	–	9	–	0
$ – Conference champion; Rankings from AP Poll

The 1967 Nebraska Cornhuskers football team was the representative of the University of Nebraska and member of the Big Eight Conference in the 1967 NCAA University Division football season. The team was coached by Bob Devaney and played their home games at Memorial Stadium in Lincoln, Nebraska.

== Schedule ==
Date	Time	Opponent	Rank	Site	TV	Result	Attendance	Source
September 16	4:00 pm	at Washington*		Husky Stadium; Seattle, WA		W 17–7	57,000	
September 30	2:00 pm	Minnesota*	No. 7	Memorial Stadium; Lincoln, NE (rivalry)		W 7–0	65,361	
October 7	1:30 pm	at Kansas State	No. 7	Memorial Stadium; Manhattan, KS (rivalry)		W 16–14	20,000	
October 14	1:30 pm	at Kansas	No. 8	Memorial Stadium; Lawrence, KS (rivalry)		L 0–10	40,000	
October 21	2:00 pm	No. 4 Colorado		Memorial Stadium; Lincoln, NE (rivalry)		L 16–21	65,766	
October 28	1:30 pm	at TCU*		Amon G. Carter Stadium; Fort Worth, TX		W 29–0	18,529	
November 4	2:00 pm	Iowa State		Memorial Stadium; Lincoln, NE (rivalry)		W 12–0	65,078	
November 11	2:00 pm	Oklahoma State^{†}		Memorial Stadium; Lincoln, NE		W 9–0	65,461	
November 18	1:30 pm	at Missouri		Memorial Stadium; Columbia, MO (rivalry)		L 7–10	56,400	
November 23	2:05 pm	No. 5 Oklahoma		Memorial Stadium; Lincoln, NE (rivalry)	ABC	L 14–21	60,048	
*Non-conference game; ^{†}Homecoming; Rankings from AP Poll released prior to the game; All times are in Central time

== Roster ==
Official Roster
21 Ahlmann, Harold LB (So.); 33 Alvarez, Barry LB (Sr.); 65 Armstrong, Joe C (Jr.); 67 Ashman, Carl RG (So.); 96 Avolio, Frank DE (So.); 61 Beland, Ben RG (So.); 27 Best, Bob CB (Jr.); 46 Bomberger, Bill HB (So.); 69 Brichacek, Mel LG (Jr.); 53 Buckler, George RG (Sr.); 52 Buda, Joe C (So.); 97 Burdic, Mike DT (So.); 35 Critchlow, Paul DE (Jr.); 80 Curtis, Wray DE (So.); 13 Daiss, Bill LB (So.); 45 Davis, Dick FB (Jr.); 76 Delaney, Dan LT (Jr.); 91 Drakulich, Ron DT (So.); 15 Dvorsak, Tony QB (So.); 32 Fiala, Adrian LB (So.); 11 Fierro, Al QB (Jr.); 28 Frost, Larry HB (So.); 63 Galbraith, Denis RG (So.); 78 Gatziolis, Jim LT (Sr.); 37 Geddes, Ken LB (So.); 18 Green, Laurie CB (So.); 34 Green, Mike HB (So.); 22 Gregory, Ben HB (Sr.); 59 Grenfell, Bob RT (So.); 38 Haasch, Richard TE (Sr.); 74 Hansen, Ed RT (Jr.); 79 Hansen, Larry DT; 16 Harding, Bruce LB (So.); 50 Harding, Steve C (So.); 51 Harr, Ray C (So.); 41 Harris, Dave DE (So.); 39 Hartman, Dan CB (So.); 26 Hawkins, James CB (Jr.); 57 Hayward, Keith LG (So.); 98 Hornbacher, Bill MG (So.); 43 Janik, Leonard DE (Sr.); 81 Jarmon, Sherwin SE (So.); 84 Kimmel, Miles SE (Jr.)	49 Kobza, Dan LB (So.); 54 Kudrna, Roger C (Sr.); 42 Kuehl, Alan LB (Sr.); 73 Kusserow, Ken RT (So.); 47 Lahey, Pat DT (So.); 20 Larson, Al CB (So.); 71 Liggett, Bob DT (So.); 62 Linstroth, Tom LG (Jr.); 17 Lowe, Rex HB (So.); 94 Mawhinney, Bob MG (So.); 64 McCord, M. Jim DT (Sr.); 70 McGhee, Donnie LT (So.); 58 Meagher, Harry MG (Sr.); 66 Meylan, Wayne MG (Sr.); 14 Minor, Wilfred S (So.); 89 Morrison, Dennis TE (Sr.); 30 Mueller, Marv S (Sr.); 31 Orduna, Joe HB (So.); 10 Patrick, Frank QB (So.); 72 Patterson, Glenn LT (So.); * 88 Patton, Jerry DT (Sr.): 85 Penney, Tom HB (Jr.); 95 Quinten, Karl DE (So.); 25 Reeves, Randy S (So.); 82 Richnafsky, Dennis SE (Sr.); 12 Sigler, Ernie QB (Jr.); 40 Smith, Reggie HB (So.); 83 Smith, Tom SE (Sr.); 36 Stephenson, Dana CB (So.); 56 Stigge, Russ RG (So.); 75 Taucher, Robert RT (Sr.); 87 Topliff, Paul TE (So.); 19 Vactor, Frank CB (So.); 48 Vassar, Phil FB (So.); 23 Weinman, Bob DE (Sr.); 93 Wheeler, Kim LB (So.); 77 Williams, Gale LG (So.); 90 Wynn, Mike DE (So.); 24 Yannon, Buster FB (So.); 68 Young, Lynn RG (So.); 55 Yungblut, Steve LT (So.); 29 Ziegler, Mick HB (Jr.); 86 Zimmer, Ivan DE (Sr.)

== Depth chart ==
Defensive starters

S
Marv Mueller
Randy Reeves

S
Dana Stephenson
Pat Larson

LB	LB
Ken Geddes	Barry Alvarez
Dan Kobza	Adrian Fiala

CB
Adrian Fiala
Laurie Green

DE	DT	NT	DT	DE
Frank Avolio	Jim McCord	Wayne Meylan	Jerry Patton	Mike Wynn
Leonard Janik	Ron Drakulich	Harry Meagher	Denis Galbraith	Ivan Zimmer

CB
James Hawkins
Bob Best

Offensive starters

TE
Dennis Morrison
Paul Topliff

LT	LG	C	RG	RT
Glenn Patterson	Mel Brichacek	Roger Kudrna	Joe Armstrong	Robert Taucher
Dan Delaney	Gale Williams	Joe Buda	Carl Ashman	Ed Hansen

TE
Dennis Richnafsky
Tom Penney
Sherwin Jarmon

QB
Frank Patrick
Al Fierro

LB	RB	FB
Ben Gregory	Joe Orduna	Dick Davis
Larry Frost	Mike Green	Buster Yannon

== Coaching staff ==
Name	Title	First year in this position	Years at Nebraska	Alma mater
Bob Devaney	Head coach	1962	1962–1972	Alma
Tom Osborne	Offensive assistant	1964	1964–1997	Hastings
John Melton		1962	1962–1988	Wyoming
Cletus Fischer	Offensive line	1960	1960–1985	Nebraska
Mike Corgan	Running backs	1962	1962–1982	Notre Dame
George Kelly		1960	1960–1968	
Jim Ross		1962	1962–1976	
Monte Kiffin	Graduate assistant	1967	1967–1976	Nebraska
Carl Selmer	Offensive line	1962	1962–1972	

== Game summaries ==
=== Washington ===
Team	1	2	3	4	Total
• Nebraska	7	10	0	0	17
Washington	0	7	0	0	7

- Location: Husky Stadium, Seattle
- Game attendance: 57,481

=== Minnesota ===
Team	1	2	3	4	Total
Minnesota	0	0	0	0	0
• #7 Nebraska	0	0	7	0	7

- Location: Memorial Stadium, Lincoln, Nebraska
- Game attendance: 65,347

=== Kansas State ===
Team	1	2	3	4	Total
• #7 Nebraska	0	7	6	3	16
Kansas State	14	0	0	0	14

- Location: Memorial Stadium, Manhattan, Kansas
- Game attendance: 20,180

=== Kansas ===
Team	1	2	3	4	Total
#8 Nebraska	0	0	0	0	0
• Kansas	0	7	0	3	10

- Location: Memorial Stadium, Lawrence, Kansas
- Game attendance: 36,896

=== Colorado ===
Team	1	2	3	4	Total
• #4 Colorado	0	14	7	0	21
Nebraska	7	0	6	3	16

- Date: October 21
- Location: Memorial Stadium, Lincoln, Nebraska
- Game attendance: 65,842

=== TCU ===
Team	1	2	3	4	Total
• Nebraska	13	3	6	7	29
TCU	0	0	0	0	0

- Date: October 28
- Location: Amon G. Carter Stadium, Fort Worth, Texas
- Game attendance: 18,529

=== Iowa State ===
Team	1	2	3	4	Total
Iowa State	0	0	0	0	0
• Nebraska	3	0	9	0	12

- Date: November 4
- Location: Memorial Stadium, Lincoln, Nebraska
- Game attendance: 64,563

=== Oklahoma State ===
Team	1	2	3	4	Total
Oklahoma State	0	0	0	0	0
• Nebraska	0	6	0	3	9

- Date: November 11
- Location: Memorial Stadium, Lincoln, Nebraska
- Game attendance: 65,388

=== Missouri ===
Team	1	2	3	4	Total
Nebraska	7	0	0	0	7
• Missouri	0	3	0	7	10

- Date: November 18
- Location: Faurot Field, Columbia, Missouri
- Game attendance: 55,504

=== Oklahoma ===
Team	1	2	3	4	Total
• #5 Oklahoma	10	3	0	8	21
Nebraska	0	14	0	0	14

- Date: November 23
- Location: Memorial Stadium, Lincoln, Nebraska
- Game attendance: 59,792
- TV announcers (ABC): Chris Schenkel, Bud Wilkinson

Scoring summary
Q1	11:49	OU	Vachon 20 yard field goal	OU 3–0
Q1	1:21	OU	Shotts 1 yard run (Vachon kick)	OU 10–0
Q2	13:19	OU	Vachon 43 yard field goal	OU 13–0
Q2	8:23	NU	Gregory 9 yard pass from Patrick (Bomberger kick)	OU 13–7
Q2	0:48	NU	Patrick 1 yard run (Bomberger kick)	NU 14–13
Q4	14:12	OU	Hinton 23 yard run (Zabel pass from Shotts)	OU 21–14

== Rankings ==
Ranking movements Legend: ██ Increase in ranking ██ Decrease in ranking — = Not ranked
	Week											
Poll	Pre	1	2	3	4	5	6	7	8	9	10	Final
AP	—	—	7	7	8	—	—	—	—	—	—	—
Coaches	N/A	N/A	N/A	N/A	N/A	N/A	N/A	N/A	N/A	N/A	N/A	—

== After the season ==
=== Awards ===
- UPI Big 8 Player of the Year: Wayne Meylan
- All American: Wayne Meylan
- All American Honorable Mention: Barry Alvarez, Dick Davis, Jim McCord, Marv Mueller, Dennis Richnafsky, Bob Taucher
- All Big 8: Dick Davis, Jim McCord, Wayne Meylan, Dennis Richnafsky
- All Big 8 2nd Team: Barry Alvarez, Dick Davis, Jim McCord, Marv Mueller, Bob Taucher
- All Big 8 Honorable Mention: Ken Geddes, Ben Gregory, Roger Kudrna, Dennis Morrison, Joe Orduna, Frank Patrick

== Future professional players ==
- Dick Davis, 1969 12th-round pick of the Cleveland Browns
- Ken Geddes, 1970 7th-round pick of the Detroit Lions
- Ben Gregory, 1968 5th-round pick of the Buffalo Bills
- James Hawkins, 1969 7th-round pick of the Los Angeles Rams
- Bob Liggett, 1970 15th-round pick of the Kansas City Chiefs
- Wayne Meylan, 1968 4th-round pick of the Cleveland Browns
- Frank Patrick, 1970 10th-round pick of the Green Bay Packers
- Glenn Patterson, 1970 17th-round pick of the Dallas Cowboys
- Dana Stephenson, 1970 8th-round pick of the Chicago bears
- Bob Taucher, 1968 7th-round pick of the Dallas Cowboys
- Mike Wynn, 1970 8th-round pick of the Oakland Raiders
