= 1967 Miami Hurricanes football team =

American college football season

1967 Miami Hurricanes football

Bluebonnet Bowl, L 21–31 vs. Colorado
- Conference: Independent

Ranking
- Coaches: No. 16
- Record: 7–4
- Head coach: Charlie Tate (4th season)
- MVP: Jim Cox
- Home stadium: Miami Orange Bowl

1967 NCAA University Division independents football records
	Conf.			Overall
Team	W	L	T	W		L		T
Army		–		8	–	2	–	0
No. 5 Notre Dame		–		8	–	2	–	0
Syracuse		–		8	–	2	–	0
No. 10 Penn State		–		8	–	2	–	1
New Mexico State		–		7	–	2	–	1
UTEP		–		7	–	2	–	1
Utah State		–		7	–	2	–	1
Florida State		–		7	–	2	–	2
West Texas State		–		8	–	3	–	0
Houston		–		7	–	3	–	0
Virginia Tech		–		7	–	3	–	0
Memphis State		–		6	–	3	–	0
Southern Miss		–		6	–	3	–	0
Dayton		–		6	–	3	–	1
Xavier		–		6	–	3	–	1
Miami (FL)		–		7	–	4	–	0
Buffalo		–		6	–	4	–	0
Navy		–		5	–	4	–	1
Holy Cross		–		5	–	5	–	0
Colorado State		–		4	–	5	–	1
Boston College		–		4	–	6	–	0
Georgia Tech		–		4	–	6	–	0
Villanova		–		4	–	6	–	0
Air Force		–		2	–	6	–	2
Tulane		–		3	–	7	–	0
San Jose State		–		2	–	7	–	0
Colgate		–		2	–	8	–	0
Pittsburgh		–		1	–	9	–	0
Rankings from AP Poll

The 1967 Miami Hurricanes football team represented the University of Miami as an independent during the 1967 NCAA University Division football season. Led by fourth-year head coach Charlie Tate, the Hurricanes played their home games at the Miami Orange Bowl in Miami, Florida. They finished the season 7–4 and were invited to the Bluebonnet Bowl, where they lost to Colorado.

== Schedule ==
Date	Time	Opponent	Rank	Site	TV	Result	Attendance	Source
September 23		at Northwestern	No. 8	Dyche Stadium; Evanston, IL	ABC	L 7–12	38,780	
September 29		Penn State		Miami Orange Bowl; Miami, FL		L 8–17	39,516	
October 6		Tulane		Miami Orange Bowl; Miami, FL		W 34–14	27,510	
October 14		at LSU		Tiger Stadium; Baton Rouge, LA		W 17–15	67,000	
October 21		at Pittsburgh		Pitt Stadium; Pittsburgh, PA		W 58–0	24,371	
October 27		Auburn		Miami Orange Bowl; Miami, FL		W 7–0	50,056	
November 4		at Virginia Tech		Lane Stadium; Blacksburg, VA (rivalry)		W 14–7	35,000	
November 10		Georgia Tech		Miami Orange Bowl; Miami, FL		W 49–7	48,267	
November 24	8:15 p.m.	No. 6 Notre Dame		Miami Orange Bowl; Miami, FL (rivalry)		L 22–24	77,265	
December 9		Florida		Miami Orange Bowl; Miami, FL (rivalry)	ABC	W 20–13	53,229	
December 23		vs. Colorado		Rice Stadium; Houston, TX (Bluebonnet Bowl)	ABC	L 21–31	30,156	
Rankings from AP Poll released prior to the game

== Roster ==
- Ted Hendricks, Jr.
- Vince Opalsky, So.
