= 1967 Gator Bowl =

American college football game

Florida State Seminoles	Penn State Nittany Lions
(7–2–1)	(8–2)
Independent	Independent
17	17
Head coach: Bill Peterson	Head coach: Joe Paterno
Coaches 15	AP / Coaches; 10 / 11
	1	2	3	4	Total
Florida State	0	0	14	3	17
Penn State	3	14	0	0	17
- Date: December 30, 1967
- Season: 1967
- Stadium: Gator Bowl Stadium
- Location: Jacksonville, Florida
- MVP: QB Kim Hammond (Florida State); QB/PK Tom Sherman (Penn State)
- Referee: Paul Bertha (ECAC) (split crew: ECAC, SEC)

United States TV coverage
- Network: ABC

The 1967 Gator Bowl was a college football postseason bowl game that featured the Florida State Seminoles and the Penn State Nittany Lions.

== Background ==
Florida State was making their third bowl game appearance in four years, with two Gator Bowls in a two-year span. Penn State was making their fifth bowl game in eight years, with three Gator Bowls in a seven-year span.

== Game summary ==
- Penn State - Tom Sherman, 27 yard field goal
- Penn State - Jack Curry, nine yard touchdown pass from Sherman (Sherman kick)
- Penn State - Ted Kwalick, 12 yard touchdown pass from Sherman (Sherman kick)
- Florida State - Ron Sellers, 20 yard touchdown pass from Kim Hammond (Grant Guthrie kick)
- Florida State - Kim Hammond, one yard touchdown run (Guthrie kick)
- Florida State - Grant Guthrie, 26 yard field goal

Kim Hammond completed 37-of-53 passes for 362 yards, with four interceptions and one touchdown, while rushing for 28 yards on nine carries. Tom Sherman completed 9-of-17 passes for 69 yards, with two interceptions and two touchdowns, while rushing for 27 yards on six carries, contributing a field goal and two extra points. Florida State scored 17 straight points in the second half, with Grant Guthrie's field goal from 26 yards out contributing to the first tie in a Gator Bowl since 1948. It remains the last tie game in the Gator Bowl. Florida State had 23 first downs; Penn State had 12. Florida State rushed for only 55 yards while Penn State rushed for 175. Florida State threw for 363 yards; Penn State threw for 69 yards. Both teams turned the ball over four times.

== Aftermath ==
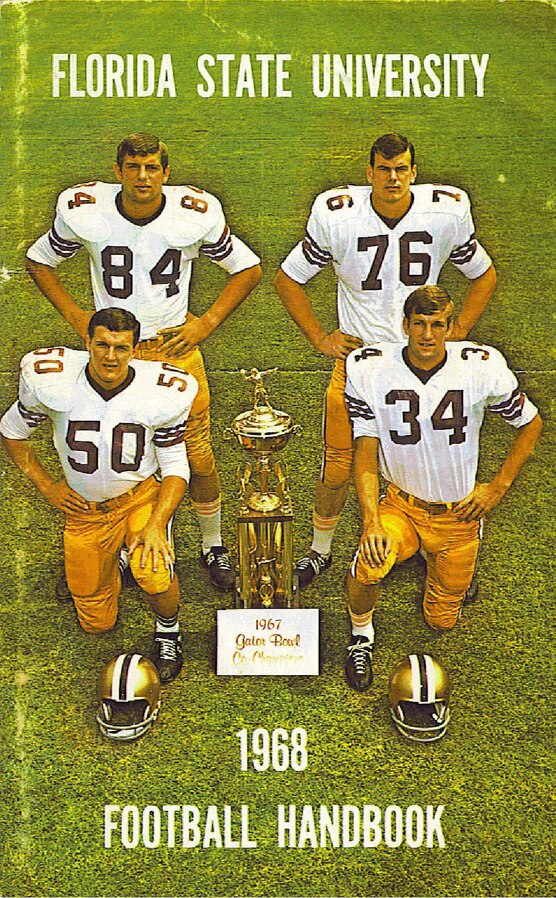
Several members of the 1967 Seminoles team pose with a Gator Bowl trophy on the cover of their 1968 media guide

The Seminoles reached one more bowl game in the decade, while not returning to the Gator Bowl until 1982. Penn State also reached one more bowl game in the decade. They did not lose for the next 23 games, completing two undefeated seasons. The Nittany Lions returned to the Gator Bowl in 1976.
