= 1967 Liberty Bowl =

American college football game

- 9th Liberty Bowl
NC State Wolfpack	Georgia Bulldogs
(8–2)	(7–3)
ACC	SEC
14	7
Head coach: Earle Edwards	Head coach: Vince Dooley
AP / Coaches; NR / 17	AP / Coaches; NR / 18
	1	2	3	4	Total
NC State	0	7	0	7	14
Georgia	0	7	0	0	7
- Date: December 16, 1967
- Season: 1967
- Stadium: Memphis Memorial Stadium
- Location: Memphis, Tennessee
- MVP: QB Jim Donnan (NC State)
- Referee: Charles Bowen (SEC; split crew: SEC, ACC)
- Attendance: 35,045

United States TV coverage
- Network: ABC

The 1967 Liberty Bowl was a college football postseason bowl game played on December 16, 1967, at Liberty Bowl Memorial Stadium in Memphis, Tennessee. The ninth edition of the Liberty Bowl, it featured the NC State Wolfpack of the Atlantic Coast Conference (ACC) and the Georgia Bulldogs of the Southeastern Conference (SEC).

== Background ==
The Wolfpack finished 2nd in the Atlantic Coast Conference. The Bulldogs finished 5th in the Southeastern Conference. This was NC State's first bowl since 1963, which was also in the Liberty Bowl. This was Georgia's first ever Liberty Bowl.

== Game summary ==
A 65-yard drive by the Wolfpack culminated with a Jim Donnan touchdown pass to Harry Martel to make it 7–0 in the 2nd. Georgia responded with a 68-yard drive with Ronnie Jenkins scoring on a touchdown plunge to tie it before halftime. In the second half, the game was decided in the final minutes. NC State drove 73 yards and scored on a Tony Barchuk touchdown run to make it 14–7. Later on, the Bulldogs went on a 98-yard drive, trying to tie the score late in the game. However, QB Kent Lawrence was stopped one yard short of the goal line, as the Wolfpack held on to win the game. Donnan went 16-of-24 for 121 yards and a touchdown in an MVP effort.

Jim Donnan later went on to coach the Georgia Bulldogs.

== Aftermath ==
Georgia returned to the Liberty Bowl 20 years later in 1987. The Wolfpack returned in 1973.

== Statistics ==
Statistics	NC State	Georgia
First downs	14	14
Rushing yards	79	140
Passing yards	128	136
Total yards	207	276
Interception Thrown	1	0
Return Yardage	42	124
Fumbles/Lost	1–1	0–0
Punts–average	7–35.5	6–28.8
Yards penalized	45	67
