= 1967 Bluebonnet Bowl =

Colorado Buffaloes	Miami Hurricanes
(8–2)	(7–3)
31	21
Head coach: Eddie Crowder	Head coach: Charlie Tate
AP / Coaches; NR / 13	AP / Coaches; NR / 16
	1	2	3	4	Total
Colorado	7	3	7	14	31
Miami	0	14	0	7	21
- Date: December 23, 1967
- Season: 1967
- Stadium: Rice Stadium
- Location: Houston, Texas
- MVP: QB Bobby Anderson (Colorado)
- Referee: Earl Jansen (Big Eight; split crew: Big Eight, SEC)
- Attendance: 30,156

United States TV coverage
- Network: ABC
- Announcers: Chris Schenkel, Bud Wilkinson and Bill Flemming

The 1967 Bluebonnet Bowl was a college football postseason bowl game between the Colorado Buffaloes and the Miami Hurricanes.

== Background ==
After winning eight games (including the Liberty Bowl) the previous season, the Hurricanes made consecutive bowl appearances for the first time since 1961–62. The Buffaloes finished 2nd in the Big Eight Conference, but they won eight games in their first bowl game appearance since 1962.

== Game summary ==
Larry Plantz scored first for the Buffaloes with a seven-yard touchdown run to give them a 7–0 lead with 4:16 to go in the 1st. Joe Mira responded for the Hurricanes with 14:12 to go in the 2nd with a touchdown run from two yards out to tie the game. With 5:46 to go, Jimmy Dye intercepted a Dan Kelly pass and returned it for 77 yards for a Miami touchdown. John Farler kicked a field goal with :07 left in the half to make it 14–10 Miami. An eighty-yard drive led to a touchdown culminated by QB Bobby Anderson (replacing Kelly due to an ankle problem) running in for a two-yard score to make it 17–14 with 11:11 to go in the 3rd. Jerry Daanen scored on a nine-yard touchdown catch from Bill Miller to make it 21–17 Miami with 14:55 to go in the 4th quarter. But Colorado took the lead back on an Anderson 38-yard touchdown run with 6:55 remaining. A Miami drive was stopped at their 43 on an Issac Howard interception, returned for 9 yards to the 34. With 1:02 remaining, Wilmer Cooks scored on a two-yard run to make it 31–21. Anderson was named MVP, passing for 5-of-10 for 49 yards and rushing for 108 yards on 17 carries, with two touchdowns. He also punted 7 rimes for 34.9 yards per punt. Colorado held onto the ball for 34:39, while Miami held onto it for 25:21. The Buffaloes were 7 of 15 on third downs, while the Hurricanes were 2 of 12.

== Statistics ==
Statistics	Colorado	Miami
First downs	21	14
Rushing yards	283	120
Passing yards	82	113
Total yards	365	233
Passing (C–A–I)	10–21–1	10–28–2
Punts–average	3–32.5	7–37.7
Fumbles–lost	2–0	2–1
Penalties–yards	2–10	9–75

== Aftermath ==
The Hurricanes did not compete in a bowl game again until 1981, with Howard Schnellenberger at the helm, the sixth coach hired after Tate left in 1970. Four years later, Colorado won the Bluebonnet Bowl (by then renamed the Astro-Bluebonnet Bowl) once again. In their next two appearances in the bowl, however, they lost both times.
