= Melvin Robertson =

American football player and coach (born 1928)

Biographical details
- Born: May 25, 1928 (age 98)

Playing career
- 1947–1950: West Texas State
- Position: Defensive back

Coaching career (HC unless noted)
- 1961–1964: Odessa HS (TX) (assistant)
- 1965–1971: Houston (DC)
- 1972–1978: Texas A&M (DC)
- 1979–1985: Mississippi State (DC)
- 1986–1987: SMU (assistant)
- 1988–1990: Irving MacArthur HS (TX) (DC)
- 1991–1993: Houston (LB)

Melvin Robertson (born May 25, 1928) is an American former football coach. He was considered one of the top defensive minds in football during the 1970s and 80s.

"Mad Dog" Robertson began his coaching career as an assistant under Bradley Mills at Odessa High School, before joining Bill Yeoman's staff at the University of Houston as defensive backs coach in 1965. In 1972 Emory Bellard, who had just been named Texas A&M head coach, hired Robertson as defensive coordinator. A&M was ranked No. 1 in total defense in 1975 under Robertson, who was known for his blitz packages. Robertson followed Bellard to Mississippi State in 1979.

"Melvin's got a great reputation in pro football, college football and high school football here in Texas as one of the top defensive coaches in the country," said former University of Houston Head Football Coach John Jenkins.

Robertson is retired and lives in Grapevine, Texas.
