= 1967 NCAA University Division football rankings =

- Season: 1967
- Bowl season: 1967–68 bowl games
- Preseason No. 1: Notre Dame
- End of season champions: USC

Two human polls comprised the 1967 NCAA University Division football rankings. Unlike most sports, college football's governing body, the NCAA, does not bestow a national championship, instead that title is bestowed by one or more different polling agencies. There are two main weekly polls that begin in the preseason—the AP Poll and the Coaches Poll.

== Legend ==
| | Increase in ranking |
| | Decrease in ranking |
| | Not ranked previous week |
| | National champion |
| (#–#) | Win–loss record |
| (Italics) | Number of first place votes |
| т | Tied with team above or below also with this symbol |

== AP Poll ==
The final AP Poll was released in late November, at the end of the 1967 regular season. This was last time that the final poll was conducted before bowl season.

The AP ranked only the top ten teams from 1962 through 1967.

| | Preseason Aug | Week 1 Sep 18 | Week 2 Sep 25 | Week 3 Oct 2 | Week 4 Oct 9 | Week 5 Oct 16 | Week 6 Oct 23 | Week 7 Oct 30 | Week 8 Nov 6 | Week 9 Nov 13 | Week 10 Nov 20 | Week 11 (Final) Nov 27 | |
|---|---|---|---|---|---|---|---|---|---|---|---|---|---|
| 1. | Notre Dame (17) | Notre Dame (0–0) (22) | Notre Dame (1–0) (31) | USC (3–0) (20) | USC (4–0) (36) | USC (5–0) (36) | USC (6–0) (37) | USC (7–0) (43) | USC (8–0) (39) | UCLA (7–0–1) (19) | USC (9–1) (21) | USC (9–1) (36) | 1. |
| 2. | Alabama (11) | Alabama (0–0) (7) | USC (2–0) (4) | Houston (3–0) (10) | Purdue (3–0) (10) | Purdue (4–0) (7) | UCLA (6–0) | UCLA (6–0) | Tennessee (5–1) | Tennessee (6–1) (13) | Tennessee (7–1) (15) | Tennessee (8–1) (11) | 2. |
| 3. | Michigan State (1) | Michigan State (0–0) (1) | Houston (2–0) (6) | UCLA (3–0) (6) | Georgia (3–0) | UCLA (5–0) | Colorado (5–0) | Tennessee (4–1) | NC State (8–0) | Purdue (7–1) (8) | Purdue (8–1) (9) | Oklahoma (8–1) | 3. |
| 4. | Texas (2) | USC (1–0) | UCLA (2–0) | Purdue (2–0) (9) | UCLA (4–0) | Colorado (4–0) | Tennessee (3–1) | NC State (7–0) | UCLA (6–0–1) | USC (8–1) (5) | UCLA (7–1–1) | Indiana (9–1) | 4. |
| 5. | Miami (FL) | Texas (0–0) (2) | Georgia (1–0) | Georgia (2–0) (1) | Notre Dame (2–1) | NC State (5–0) (1) | NC State (6–0) | Georgia (5–1) | Purdue (6–1) (1) | Indiana (8–0) (1) | Oklahoma (7–1) (1) | Notre Dame (8–2) (1) | 5. |
| 6. | Georgia | UCLA (1–0) (3) | Colorado (2–0) | Notre Dame (1–1) | Colorado (3–0) | Alabama (3–0–1) | Georgia (4–1) | Purdue (5–1) | Indiana (7–0) | Wyoming (9–0) | Notre Dame (7–2) | Wyoming (10–0) (1) | 6. |
| 7. | USC (1) | Georgia (0–0) | Nebraska (1–0) | Nebraska (2–0) | Alabama (2–0–1) | Tennessee (2–1) | Purdue (4–1) | Indiana (6–0) | Wyoming (8–0) | Oklahoma (6–1) | Wyoming (10–0) (1) | Oregon State (7–2–1) | 7. |
| 8. | UCLA | Miami (FL) (0–0) | Texas (0–1) | Colorado (2–0) | Nebraska (3–0) | Georgia (3–1) | Wyoming (6–0) | Wyoming (7–0) | Oklahoma (5–1) | Oregon State (6–2–1) (1) | Oregon State (7–2–1) | Alabama (7–1–1) | 8. |
| 9. | Tennessee | Colorado (1–0) | Alabama (0–0–1) | Alabama (1–0–1) | NC State (4–0) (4) | Houston (3–1) | Houston (4–1) | Colorado (5–1) | Notre Dame (5–2) | Notre Dame (6–2) | Alabama (7–1–1) | Purdue (8–2) | 9. |
| 10. | Colorado | Nebraska (1–0) (1) | Purdue (1–0) | Texas Tech (2–0) | Houston (3–1) | Wyoming (5–0) | Indiana (5–0) | Notre Dame (4–2) | Houston (5–2) | NC State (8–1) | Houston (7–2) | Penn State (8–2) | 10. |
| | Preseason Aug | Week 1 Sep 18 | Week 2 Sep 25 | Week 3 Oct 2 | Week 4 Oct 9 | Week 5 Oct 16 | Week 6 Oct 23 | Week 7 Oct 30 | Week 8 Nov 6 | Week 9 Nov 13 | Week 10 Nov 20 | Week 11 (Final) Nov 27 | |
| | | Dropped: Tennessee | Dropped: Miami (FL); Michigan State | Dropped: Texas | Dropped: Texas Tech | Dropped: Nebraska; Notre Dame | Dropped: Alabama | Dropped: Houston | Dropped: Colorado; Georgia | Dropped: Houston | Dropped: Indiana; NC State | Dropped: Houston; UCLA | |

== Final Coaches Poll ==
The final UPI Coaches Poll was released prior to the bowl games, in late November.
USC received 27 of the 34 first-place votes; Tennessee received six and Oklahoma one.

| Ranking | Team | Conference | Bowl |
|---|---|---|---|
| 1 | USC | Pac-8 | Won Rose, 14–3 |
| 2 | Tennessee | SEC | Lost Orange, 24–26 |
| 3 | Oklahoma | Big Eight | Won Orange, 26–24 |
| 4 | Notre Dame | Independent | none |
| 5 | Wyoming | WAC | Lost Sugar, 13–20 |
| 6 | Indiana | Big Ten | Lost Rose, 3–14 |
| 7 | Alabama | SEC | Lost Cotton, 16–20 |
| 8 | Oregon State | Pac-8 | none |
| 9 | Purdue | Big Ten | none |
| 10 | UCLA | Pac-8 | none |
| 11 | Penn State | Independent | Tied Gator, 17–17 |
| 12 | Syracuse | Independent | none |
| 13 | Colorado | Big Eight | Won Bluebonnet, 31–21 |
| 14 | Minnesota | Big Ten | none |
| 15 | Florida State | Independent | Tied Gator, 17–17 |
| 16 | Miami (FL) | Independent | Lost Bluebonnet, 21–31 |
| 17 | NC State | ACC | Won Liberty, 14–7 |
| 18 | Georgia | SEC | Lost Liberty, 7–14 |
| 19 | Houston | Independent | none |
| 20 | Arizona State | WAC | none |

- Notre Dame did not participate in bowl games from 1925 through 1968.
- Prior to the 1975 season, the Big Ten and Pac-8 conferences allowed only one postseason participant each, for the Rose Bowl.
- The Ivy League has prohibited its members from participating in postseason football since the league was officially formed in 1954.
