= Pac-12 Conference football statistics =

Historical statistics for football in the Pacific Coast Conference (PCC, 1915-1959), Athletic Association of Western Universities (AAWU, 1959–68), Pacific-8 (1968–78), Pacific-10 (1978-2011), and Pac-12 Conference (2011–present).

== Season finishes ==
Year	ARIZ	ASU	CAL	COL	IDA	MON	ORE	OSU	STAN	UCLA	USC	UTAH	WASH	WSU
1916			4				2	3					1	
1917			2				4	3					5	1
1918			1				2	5	4				3	
1919			3(t)				1(t)	6	5				1(t)	3(t)
1920			1				3	5	2				6	4
1921			1				5	4	3				6	2
1922			1		8		2	5(t)	5(t)		4		3	7
1923			1		3		8	7	4(t)		4(t)		2	6
1924			2		4	9	7	6	1		5		3	8
1925			5		6	8	9	3(t)	2		3(t)		1	6
1926			9		6(t)	8	6(t)	3(t)	1		2		5	3(t)
1927			5(t)		1 (t)	9	8	5(t)	1(t)		1(t)		4	7
1928			2		6(t)	10	4	6(t)	3	9	1		8	5
1929			3(t)		7(t)	9	3(t)	7(t)	2	6	1		10	5
1930			8(t)		10	7	4	6	3	8(t)	2		5	1
1931			2		8	10	3	7	6	9	1		5	4
1932			6		8(t)	10	5	8(t)	7	3	1		4	2
1933			6		9	10	1(t)	4	1(t)	8	3		7	5
1934			5		8	10	4	9	1	6	7		3	2
1935			1(t)		9	10	4(t)	7	1(t)	1(t)	8		6	4(t)
1936			4		10	8	9	7	6	5	3		1	2
1937			1		5	10	8	6	2	9	7		3	4
1938			1(t)		7	10	5	3(t)	8	3(t)	1(t)		6	9
1939			8		10	7	5	3	9	2	1		4	6
1940			6		10	8	5	3	1	9	7		2	4
1941			7		10	9	5	1	4	6	8		2(t)	2(t)
1942			7		9	10	8	5	3	1	4		6	2
1943			2							4	1		3	
1944			4							3	1		2	
1945			6		8	9	7	4		5	1		3	2
1946			9		10	7	6	2	5	1	3		4	8
1947			2(t)		9	5	2(t)	6	10	4	1		7(t)	7(t)
1948			1(t)		9	10	1(t)	6	5	8	3		7	4
1949			1		9	10	6(t)	5	3(t)	2	3(t)		6(t)	8
1950			1		5		9	8	4	3	7		2	6
1951			3		9		8	6	1	2	4		7	5
1952			4		7		6(t)	8	6(t)	2	1		3	5
1953			4		9		8	6	2	1	3		7	5
1954			4		7		3	8(t)	6	1	2		8(t)	5
1955			7		9		4	2	3	1	6		5	8
1956			8		9		5	1	6	2(t)	2(t)		4	7
1957			7(t)		9		1(t)	1(t)	5	3	7(t)		6	4
1958			1		9		5	4	7	6	3		8	2
1959			4						5	1(t)	1(t)		1(t)	
1960			4						5	3	2		1	
1961			4(t)						4(t)	1	2(t)		2(t)	
1962			6						4	5	1		2	3
1963			5						6	3	2		1	4
1964			8				6(t)	1(t)	5	4	1(t)		3	6(t)
1965			6(t)				8	7	6(t)	1	2		4	3
1966			5				6(t)	2(t)	8	2	1		4	6(t)
1967			6				7(t)	2(t)	4(t)	2(t)	1		4(t)	7(t)
1968			4				5(t)	2	3	5(t)	1		8	7
1969			6				5	4	2(t)	2(t)	1		7	8
1970			2(t)				2(t)	6(t)	1	2(t)	6(t)		2(t)	8
1971			3(t)				6	5	1	8	2		3(t)	7
1972			5				6(t)	8	6(t)	2	1		3(t)	3(t)
1973			5(t)				5(t)	5(t)	3	2	1		8	4
1974			3(t)				8	5(t)	2	3(t)	1		5(t)	7
1975			1(t)				6	7	3(t)	1(t)	5		3(t)	8
1976			4(t)				7(t)	7(t)	3	2	1		4(t)	6
1977			5(t)				7	8	2(t)	2(t)	2(t)		1	5(t)
1978	6(t)	4(t)	6(t)				8	9	4(t)	2(t)	1		2(t)	10
1979	3(t)	7(t)	5				3(t)	10	6	7(t)	1		2	9
1980	6(t)	4	8				5	10	6(t)	2	3		1	6(t)
1981	6(t)	2(t)	8				9	10	6(t)	4(t)	2(t)		1	4(t)
1982	5	3(t)	6				9	10	7	1	3(t)		2	8
1983	5	6(t)	8				6(t)	9	10	1	4		2	3
1984	3(t)	6	10				7(t)	9	7(t)	3(t)	1		2	5
1985	2(t)	2(t)	10				6	9	8	1	4(t)		4(t)	7
1986	4(t)	1	8				7	10	4(t)	2(t)	4(t)		2(t)	8
1987	7	4	8				5(t)	10	5(t)	1(t)	1(t)		3	9
1988	3(t)	5	10				6(t)	8	9	2	1		6(t)	3(t)
1989	2(t)	5	10				2(t)	6	7(t)	9	1		2(t)	7(t)
1990	5	8	4				3	10	6(t)	6(t)	2		1	9
1991	6(t)	5	2(t)				9(t)	9(t)	2(t)	2(t)	8		1	6(t)
1992	5	6(t)	9				6(t)	10	1(t)	8	3(t)		1(t)	3(t)
1993	1(t)	4(t)	4(t)				7(t)	7(t)	7(t)	1(t)	1(t)			6
1994	2(t)	7(t)	5(t)				1	7(t)	7(t)	5(t)	2(t)			4
1995	5(t)	5(t)	8(t)				3	10	4	5(t)	1(t)		1(t)	8(t)
1996	5(t)	1	5(t)				5(t)	10	3	4	5(t)		2	5(t)
1997	5(t)	3	9				7(t)	10	7(t)	1(t)	5(t)		4	1(t)
1998	2	5(t)	7				3(t)	8(t)	8(t)	1	3(t)		5(t)	10
1999	6(t)	4	6(t)				2(t)	5	1	9	6(t)		2(t)	10
2000	5(t)	5(t)	8(t)				1(t)	1(t)	4	5(t)	8(t)		1(t)	8(t)
2001	8	9	10				1	7	2(t)	6	5		2(t)	2(t)
2002	9(t)	3	4(t)				8	4(t)	9(t)	4(t)	1(t)		4(t)	1(t)
2003	10	8(t)	3(t)				3(t)	5(t)	8(t)	5(t)	1		5(t)	2
2004	8(t)	3(t)	2				5(t)	3(t)	8(t)	5(t)	1		10	7
2005	8	4(t)	4(t)				2	7	4(t)	3	1		9(t)	9(t)
2006	5(t)	5(t)	1(t)				5(t)	3	10	4	1(t)		9	5(t)
2007	6	1(t)	7(t)				4(t)	3	7(t)	4(t)	1(t)		10	7(t)
2008	5	6(t)	4				2(t)	2(t)	6(t)	8	1		10	9
2009	2(t)	9	5(t)				1	2(t)	2(t)	8	5(t)		7	10
2010	5(t)	5(t)	8				1	5(t)	2	9	3(t)		3(t)	10
2011	5(t) So	3(t) So	4 No	5(t) So			1(t) No	5 No	1(t) No	2 So	1 So	3(t) So	3 No	6 No
2012	4 So	2(t) So	5 No	6 So			1(t) No	3 No	1(t) No	1 So	2(t) So	5 So	4 No	6 No
2013	4 So	1 So	6 No	6 So			1(t) No	4(t) No	1(t) No	2(t) So	2(t) So	5 So	3 No	4(t) No
2014	1 So	2(t) So	4 No	6 So			1 No	5(t) No	2 No	2(t) So	2(t) So	5 So	3 No	5(t) No
2015	5 So	4 So	4(t) No	6 So			2 No	6 No	1 No	3 So	1(t) So	1(t) So	4(t) No	3 No
Year	ARIZ	ASU	CAL	COL	IDA	MON	ORE	OSU	STAN	UCLA	USC	UTAH	WASH	WSU
