= 1967 NC State Wolfpack football team =

American college football season

1967 NC State Wolfpack football

Liberty Bowl champion

Liberty Bowl, W 14–7 vs. Georgia
- Conference: Atlantic Coast Conference

Ranking
- Coaches: No. 17
- Record: 9–2 (5–1 ACC)
- Head coach: Earle Edwards (14th season)
- Home stadium: Carter Stadium

1967 Atlantic Coast Conference football standings
	Conf.					Overall
Team	W		L		T	W		L		T
Clemson $	6	–	0	–	0	6	–	4	–	0
NC State	5	–	1	–	0	9	–	2	–	0
South Carolina	4	–	2	–	0	5	–	5	–	0
Virginia	3	–	3	–	0	5	–	5	–	0
Wake Forest	3	–	4	–	0	4	–	6	–	0
Duke	2	–	4	–	0	4	–	6	–	0
North Carolina	2	–	5	–	0	2	–	8	–	0
Maryland	0	–	6	–	0	0	–	9	–	0
$ – Conference champion

The 1967 NC State Wolfpack football team represented North Carolina State University during the 1967 NCAA University Division football season. The Wolfpack were led by 14th-year head coach Earle Edwards and played their home games at Carter Stadium in Raleigh, North Carolina. They competed as members of the Atlantic Coast Conference, finishing in second.

The Wolfpack began the year with 8 consecutive victories, including a win over the second-ranked Houston Cougars. The team climbed as high as No. 3 in the AP Poll, which is to date the highest ranking achieved in school history. A loss to Penn State derailed their perfect season, and a loss to Clemson the next week cost them the ACC title. NC State was ranked 17th in the final Coaches Poll of the season, conducted before bowl season (the AP Poll ranked only 10 teams from 1962 to 1967). They were invited to the 1967 Liberty Bowl, where they defeated Georgia.

Defensive lineman Dennis Byrd became NC State's first ever consensus first-team All-American, being selected by 6 of 7 official selectors.

== Schedule ==
Date	Opponent	Rank	Site	Result	Attendance	Source
September 16	North Carolina		Carter Stadium; Raleigh, NC (rivalry)	W 13–7	42,300	
September 23	Buffalo*		Carter Stadium; Raleigh, NC	W 24–6	20,200	
September 30	at Florida State*		Doak Campbell Stadium; Tallahassee, FL	W 20–10	34,573	
October 7	at No. 2 Houston*		Houston Astrodome; Houston, TX	W 16–6	52,483	
October 14	at Maryland	No. 9	Byrd Stadium; College Park, MD	W 31–9	27,100	
October 21	Wake Forest	No. 5	Carter Stadium; Raleigh, NC (rivalry)	W 24–7	30,300	
October 28	Duke	No. 5	Carter Stadium; Raleigh, NC (rivalry)	W 28–7	44,000	
November 4	at Virginia	No. 4	Scott Stadium; Charlottesville, VA	W 30–8	16,000	
November 11	at Penn State*	No. 3	Beaver Stadium; University Park, PA	L 8–13	46,497	
November 18	at Clemson	No. 10	Memorial Stadium; Clemson, SC (rivalry)	L 6–14	47,074	
December 16	vs. Georgia*		Memphis Memorial Stadium; Memphis, TN (Liberty Bowl)	W 14–7	35,045	
*Non-conference game; Rankings from AP Poll released prior to the game
