= 1967 North Carolina Tar Heels football team =

American college football season

1967 North Carolina Tar Heels football
- Conference: Atlantic Coast Conference
- Record: 2–8 (2–5 ACC)
- Head coach: Bill Dooley (1st season)
- Offensive coordinator: Bobby Collins (1st season)
- Defensive coordinator: Lee Hayley (1st season)
- Captains: Jack Davenport; David Riggs
- Home stadium: Kenan Memorial Stadium

1967 Atlantic Coast Conference football standings
| | Conf. | | | | | Overall |
| Team | W | | L | | T | W | | L | | T |
|---|---|---|---|---|---|---|---|---|---|---|
| Clemson $ | 6 | – | 0 | – | 0 | 6 | – | 4 | – | 0 |
| NC State | 5 | – | 1 | – | 0 | 9 | – | 2 | – | 0 |
| South Carolina | 4 | – | 2 | – | 0 | 5 | – | 5 | – | 0 |
| Virginia | 3 | – | 3 | – | 0 | 5 | – | 5 | – | 0 |
| Wake Forest | 3 | – | 4 | – | 0 | 4 | – | 6 | – | 0 |
| Duke | 2 | – | 4 | – | 0 | 4 | – | 6 | – | 0 |
| North Carolina | 2 | – | 5 | – | 0 | 2 | – | 8 | – | 0 |
| Maryland | 0 | – | 6 | – | 0 | 0 | – | 9 | – | 0 |
$ – Conference champion

The 1967 North Carolina Tar Heels football team represented the University of North Carolina at Chapel Hill during the 1967 NCAA University Division football season. The Tar Heels were led by first-year head coach Bill Dooley and played their home games at Kenan Memorial Stadium in Chapel Hill, North Carolina.

== Schedule ==
| Date | Time | Opponent | Site | Result | Attendance | Source |
|---|---|---|---|---|---|---|
| September 16 | 2:00 p.m. | at NC State | Carter Stadium; Raleigh, NC (rivalry) | L 7–13 | 42,300 | |
| September 23 | 7:30 p.m. | at South Carolina | Carolina Stadium; Columbia, SC (rivalry) | L 10–16 | 39,135 | |
| September 30 | 1:30 p.m. | Tulane* | Kenan Memorial Stadium; Chapel Hill, NC | L 11–36 | 32,000 | |
| October 7 | 1:30 p.m. | Vanderbilt* | Kenan Memorial Stadium; Chapel Hill, NC | L 7–21 | 25,000 | |
| October 14 | 3:30 p.m. | at Air Force* | Falcon Stadium; Colorado Springs, CO | L 8–10 | 36,624 | |
| October 21 | 1:30 p.m. | Maryland | Kenan Memorial Stadium; Chapel Hill, NC | W 14–0 | 32,000 | |
| October 28 | 1:30 p.m. | Wake Forest | Kenan Memorial Stadium; Chapel Hill, NC (rivalry) | L 10–20 | 36,000 | |
| November 4 | 1:30 p.m. | Clemson | Kenan Memorial Stadium; Chapel Hill, NC | L 0–17 | 28,549 | |
| November 11 | 1:30 p.m. | at Virginia | Scott Stadium; Charlottesville, VA (South's Oldest Rivalry) | L 17–40 | 19,000 | |
| November 18 | 2:00 p.m. | at Duke | Wallace Wade Stadium; Durham, NC (Victory Bell) | W 20–9 | 44,000 | |
*Non-conference game; All times are in Eastern time
