= 1967 Holy Cross Crusaders football team =

American college football season

1967 Holy Cross Crusaders football
- Conference: Independent
- Record: 5–5
- Head coach: Tom Boisture (1st season)
- Captain: Glenn A. Grieco
- Home stadium: Fitton Field

1967 NCAA University Division independents football records
	Conf.			Overall
Team	W	L	T	W		L		T
Army		–		8	–	2	–	0
No. 5 Notre Dame		–		8	–	2	–	0
Syracuse		–		8	–	2	–	0
No. 10 Penn State		–		8	–	2	–	1
New Mexico State		–		7	–	2	–	1
UTEP		–		7	–	2	–	1
Utah State		–		7	–	2	–	1
Florida State		–		7	–	2	–	2
West Texas State		–		8	–	3	–	0
Houston		–		7	–	3	–	0
Virginia Tech		–		7	–	3	–	0
Memphis State		–		6	–	3	–	0
Southern Miss		–		6	–	3	–	0
Dayton		–		6	–	3	–	1
Xavier		–		6	–	3	–	1
Miami (FL)		–		7	–	4	–	0
Buffalo		–		6	–	4	–	0
Navy		–		5	–	4	–	1
Holy Cross		–		5	–	5	–	0
Colorado State		–		4	–	5	–	1
Boston College		–		4	–	6	–	0
Georgia Tech		–		4	–	6	–	0
Villanova		–		4	–	6	–	0
Air Force		–		2	–	6	–	2
Tulane		–		3	–	7	–	0
San Jose State		–		2	–	7	–	0
Colgate		–		2	–	8	–	0
Pittsburgh		–		1	–	9	–	0
Rankings from AP Poll

The 1967 Holy Cross Crusaders football team was an American football team that represented the College of the Holy Cross as an independent during the 1967 NCAA University Division football season. Following Mel Massucco's resignation, former defensive coordinator Tom Boisture served his first season as head coach. The team compiled a record of 5–5.

All home games were played at Fitton Field on the Holy Cross campus in Worcester, Massachusetts.

== Schedule ==
Date	Opponent	Site	Result	Attendance	Source
September 30	at Yale	Yale Bowl; New Haven, CT	W 26–14	31,749	
October 7	at Dartmouth	Memorial Field; Hanover, NH	L 8–24	14,153	
October 14	Colgate^{†}	Fitton Field; Worcester, MA	W 17–0	16,333	
October 21	Boston University^	Fitton Field; Worcester, MA	W 21–17	12,912	
October 28	Buffalo	Fitton Field; Worcester, MA	W 38–25	12,021–12,029	
November 4	Villanova	Fitton Field; Worcester, MA	W 14–23	15,440	
November 11	at Syracuse	Archbold Stadium; Syracuse, NY	L 7–41	32,041	
November 18	at Rutgers	Rutgers Stadium; Piscataway, NJ	W 21–10	16,000	
November 25	at Connecticut	Memorial Stadium; Storrs, CT	L 0–3	3,655	
December 1	at Boston College	Fitton Field; Worcester, MA (rivalry)	L 6–13	25,000	
^{†}Homecoming; ^ Family Weekend

== Statistical leaders ==
Statistical leaders for the 1967 Crusaders included:

- Rushing: Tim Hawkes, 458 yards and 1 touchdown on 126 attempts
- Passing: Phil O'Neil, 1,378 yards, 97 completions and 10 touchdowns on 218 attempts
- Receiving: Bob Neary, 485 yards and 3 touchdowns on 34 receptions
- Scoring: John Vrionis, 42 points from 7 touchdowns and # two-point conversions
- Total offense: Phil O'Neil, 1,169 yards (1,378 passing, minus-209 rushing)
- All-purpose yards: Tim Hawkes, 521 yards (458 rushing, 63 receiving)
