= 1967 Duke Blue Devils football team =

American college football season

1967 Duke Blue Devils football
- Conference: Atlantic Coast Conference
- Record: 4–6 (2–4 ACC)
- Head coach: Tom Harp (2nd season)
- Offensive coordinator: Jacque Hetrick (2nd season)
- Defensive coordinator: George Hill (2nd season)
- MVP: Bob Foyle
- Captains: Mike Murphy; Bob Foyle
- Home stadium: Wallace Wade Stadium

1967 Atlantic Coast Conference football standings
	Conf.					Overall
Team	W		L		T	W		L		T
Clemson $	6	–	0	–	0	6	–	4	–	0
NC State	5	–	1	–	0	9	–	2	–	0
South Carolina	4	–	2	–	0	5	–	5	–	0
Virginia	3	–	3	–	0	5	–	5	–	0
Wake Forest	3	–	4	–	0	4	–	6	–	0
Duke	2	–	4	–	0	4	–	6	–	0
North Carolina	2	–	5	–	0	2	–	8	–	0
Maryland	0	–	6	–	0	0	–	9	–	0
$ – Conference champion

The 1967 Duke Blue Devils football team was an American football team that represented Duke University as a member of the Atlantic Coast Conference (ACC) during the 1967 NCAA University Division football season. In their second year under head coach Tom Harp, the Blue Devils compiled an overall record of 4–6, with a conference record of 2–4, and finished sixth in the ACC.

== Schedule ==
Date	Opponent	Site	Result	Attendance	Source
September 16	vs. Wake Forest	Carter Stadium; Raleigh, NC (rivalry)	W 31–13	22,452	
September 23	at Michigan*	Michigan Stadium; Ann Arbor, MI	L 7–10	79,492	
September 30	South Carolina	Wallace Wade Stadium; Durham, NC	L 17–21	25,000	
October 7	at Army*	Michie Stadium; West Point, NY	W 10–7	31,000	
October 14	at Virginia	Scott Stadium; Charlottesville, VA	W 13–6	25,000	
October 21	Clemson^{†}	Wallace Wade Stadium; Durham, NC	L 7–13	25,817	
October 28	at No. 5 NC State	Carter Stadium; Raleigh, NC (rivalry)	L 7–28	44,000	
November 4	at Georgia Tech*	Grant Field; Atlanta, GA	L 7–19	50,103	
November 11	vs. Navy*	Foreman Field; Norfolk, VA (Oyster Bowl)	W 35–16	30,000	
November 18	North Carolina	Wallace Wade Stadium; Durham, NC (Victory Bell)	L 9–20	44,000	
*Non-conference game; ^{†}Homecoming; Rankings from AP Poll released prior to the game
