= 1967 Southern Miss Southerners football team =

American college football season

1967 Southern Miss Southerners football
- Conference: Independent
- Record: 6–3
- Head coach: Thad Vann (19th season)
- Home stadium: Faulkner Field

1967 NCAA University Division independents football records
	Conf.			Overall
Team	W	L	T	W		L		T
Army		–		8	–	2	–	0
No. 5 Notre Dame		–		8	–	2	–	0
Syracuse		–		8	–	2	–	0
No. 10 Penn State		–		8	–	2	–	1
New Mexico State		–		7	–	2	–	1
UTEP		–		7	–	2	–	1
Utah State		–		7	–	2	–	1
Florida State		–		7	–	2	–	2
West Texas State		–		8	–	3	–	0
Houston		–		7	–	3	–	0
Virginia Tech		–		7	–	3	–	0
Memphis State		–		6	–	3	–	0
Southern Miss		–		6	–	3	–	0
Dayton		–		6	–	3	–	1
Xavier		–		6	–	3	–	1
Miami (FL)		–		7	–	4	–	0
Buffalo		–		6	–	4	–	0
Navy		–		5	–	4	–	1
Holy Cross		–		5	–	5	–	0
Colorado State		–		4	–	5	–	1
Boston College		–		4	–	6	–	0
Georgia Tech		–		4	–	6	–	0
Villanova		–		4	–	6	–	0
Air Force		–		2	–	6	–	2
Tulane		–		3	–	7	–	0
San Jose State		–		2	–	7	–	0
Colgate		–		2	–	8	–	0
Pittsburgh		–		1	–	9	–	0
Rankings from AP Poll

The 1967 Southern Miss Southerners football team was an American football team that represented the University of Southern Mississippi as an independent during the 1967 NCAA University Division football season. In their nineteenth year under head coach Thad Vann, the team compiled a 6–3 record.

== Schedule ==
Date	Opponent	Site	Result	Attendance	Source
September 16	at The Citadel	Johnson Hagood Stadium; Charleston, SC	W 10–7	11,407	
September 23	Southeastern Louisiana	Faulkner Field; Hattiesburg, MS	W 20–7	14,000	
September 30	at No. 9 Alabama	Ladd Stadium; Mobile, AL	L 3–25	38,785	
October 7	Tampa	Faulkner Field; Hattiesburg, MS	W 48–0	9,000	
October 14	at Mississippi State	Scott Field; Starkville, MS	W 21–14	24,000	
October 21	at Ole Miss	Hemingway Stadium; Oxford, MS	L 14–23	25,500	
October 28	Memphis State	Mississippi Veterans Memorial Stadium; Jackson, MS (rivalry)	L 8–24	16,000	
November 4	Richmond^{†}	Faulkner Field; Hattiesburg, MS	W 19–7	12,000	
November 23	at Louisiana Tech	State Fair Stadium; Shreveport, LA (rivalry)	W 58–7	4,500	
^{†}Homecoming; Rankings from AP Poll released prior to the game
