= 1967 Xavier Musketeers football team =

American college football season

1967 Xavier Musketeers football
- Conference: Independent
- Record: 6–3–1
- Head coach: Ed Biles (6th season)
- Home stadium: Xavier Stadium

1967 NCAA University Division independents football records
	Conf.			Overall
Team	W	L	T	W		L		T
Army		–		8	–	2	–	0
No. 5 Notre Dame		–		8	–	2	–	0
Syracuse		–		8	–	2	–	0
No. 10 Penn State		–		8	–	2	–	1
New Mexico State		–		7	–	2	–	1
UTEP		–		7	–	2	–	1
Utah State		–		7	–	2	–	1
Florida State		–		7	–	2	–	2
West Texas State		–		8	–	3	–	0
Houston		–		7	–	3	–	0
Virginia Tech		–		7	–	3	–	0
Memphis State		–		6	–	3	–	0
Southern Miss		–		6	–	3	–	0
Dayton		–		6	–	3	–	1
Xavier		–		6	–	3	–	1
Miami (FL)		–		7	–	4	–	0
Buffalo		–		6	–	4	–	0
Navy		–		5	–	4	–	1
Holy Cross		–		5	–	5	–	0
Colorado State		–		4	–	5	–	1
Boston College		–		4	–	6	–	0
Georgia Tech		–		4	–	6	–	0
Villanova		–		4	–	6	–	0
Air Force		–		2	–	6	–	2
Tulane		–		3	–	7	–	0
San Jose State		–		2	–	7	–	0
Colgate		–		2	–	8	–	0
Pittsburgh		–		1	–	9	–	0
Rankings from AP Poll

The 1967 Xavier Musketeers football team was an American football team that represented Xavier University as an independent during the 1967 NCAA University Division football season. In its sixth season under head coach Ed Biles, the team compiled a 6–3–1 record and was outscored by a total of 142 to 132.

== Schedule ==
Date	Opponent	Site	Result	Attendance	Source
September 16	Quantico Marines	Xavier Stadium; Cincinnati, OH	W 20–18	10,586	
September 23	Toledo	Xavier Stadium; Cincinnati, OH	L 7–24	10,249	
September 30	at Miami (OH)	Miami Field; Oxford, OH	W 7–6	14,953	
October 7	at Marshall	Fairfield Stadium; Huntington, WV	W 7–0	5,800	
October 14	at Cincinnati	Nippert Stadium; Cincinnati, OH	W 15–10	24,500	
October 21	at Chattanooga	Chamberlain Field; Chattanooga, TN	W 40–28	10,500–11,500	
October 28	Villanova	Xavier Stadium; Cincinnati, OH	W 3–0	11,281	
November 4	Dayton	Xavier Stadium; Cincinnati, OH	T 7–7	11,472	
November 11	at Western Michigan	Waldo Stadium; Kalamazoo, MI	L 7–18	9,000	
November 18	Kent State	Xavier Stadium; Cincinnati, OH	L 19–31	8,294	
