= 1967 New Mexico State Aggies football team =

American college football season

1967 New Mexico State Aggies football
- Conference: Independent
- Record: 7–2–1
- Head coach: Warren B. Woodson (10th season)
- Home stadium: Memorial Stadium

1967 NCAA University Division independents football records
	Conf.			Overall
Team	W	L	T	W		L		T
Army		–		8	–	2	–	0
No. 5 Notre Dame		–		8	–	2	–	0
Syracuse		–		8	–	2	–	0
No. 10 Penn State		–		8	–	2	–	1
New Mexico State		–		7	–	2	–	1
UTEP		–		7	–	2	–	1
Utah State		–		7	–	2	–	1
Florida State		–		7	–	2	–	2
West Texas State		–		8	–	3	–	0
Houston		–		7	–	3	–	0
Virginia Tech		–		7	–	3	–	0
Memphis State		–		6	–	3	–	0
Southern Miss		–		6	–	3	–	0
Dayton		–		6	–	3	–	1
Xavier		–		6	–	3	–	1
Miami (FL)		–		7	–	4	–	0
Buffalo		–		6	–	4	–	0
Navy		–		5	–	4	–	1
Holy Cross		–		5	–	5	–	0
Colorado State		–		4	–	5	–	1
Boston College		–		4	–	6	–	0
Georgia Tech		–		4	–	6	–	0
Villanova		–		4	–	6	–	0
Air Force		–		2	–	6	–	2
Tulane		–		3	–	7	–	0
San Jose State		–		2	–	7	–	0
Colgate		–		2	–	8	–	0
Pittsburgh		–		1	–	9	–	0
Rankings from AP Poll

The 1967 New Mexico State Aggies football team was an American football team that represented New Mexico State University as an independent during the 1967 NCAA University Division football season. In their tenth year under head coach Warren B. Woodson, the Aggies compiled a 7–2–1 record and outscored opponents by a total of 346 to 145. The team played its six home games at Memorial Stadium in Las Cruces, New Mexico.

The team's statistical leaders included quarterback Sal Olivas with 2,225 passing yards, running back Doug Dalton with 1,123 rushing yards, and Mike Carroll with 771 receiving yards.

Shortly after the season ended, Warren Woodson retired from his dual posts as the school's head football coach and athletic director. Woodson was within weeks of reaching the school's mandatory retirement age of 65 years.

== Schedule ==
Date	Opponent	Site	Result	Attendance	Source
September 16	Lamar Tech	Memorial Stadium; Las Cruces, NM	W 17–6	10,000	
September 23	at No. 9 UT Arlington	Memorial Stadium; Arlington, TX	L 14–15	8,500	
September 30	Utah State	Memorial Stadium; Las Cruces, NM	W 10–9	12,000	
October 7	North Texas State	Memorial Stadium; Las Cruces, NM	T 31–31		
October 14	at Wichita State	Veterans Field; Wichita, KS	W 27–14	12,000	
October 21	West Texas State	Memorial Stadium; Las Cruces, NM	W 31–10	17,500	
October 28	Louisiana Tech	Memorial Stadium; Las Cruces, NM	W 48–7	6,000	
November 4	at UTEP	Sun Bowl; El Paso, TX (rivalry)	L 24–46	28,233	
November 11	Northern Arizona	Memorial Stadium; Las Cruces, NM	W 90–0	10,000	
November 18	at New Mexico	University Stadium; Albuquerque, NM (rivalry)	W 54–7	8,326	
Rankings from AP Poll released prior to the game
