= 1967 Syracuse Orangemen football team =

American college football season

1967 Syracuse Orangemen football
- Conference: Independent

Ranking
- Coaches: No. 12
- Record: 8–2
- Head coach: Ben Schwartzwalder (19th season)
- Captains: James Cheyunski; Larry Csonka
- Home stadium: Archbold Stadium

1967 NCAA University Division independents football records
	Conf.			Overall
Team	W	L	T	W		L		T
Army		–		8	–	2	–	0
No. 5 Notre Dame		–		8	–	2	–	0
Syracuse		–		8	–	2	–	0
No. 10 Penn State		–		8	–	2	–	1
New Mexico State		–		7	–	2	–	1
UTEP		–		7	–	2	–	1
Utah State		–		7	–	2	–	1
Florida State		–		7	–	2	–	2
West Texas State		–		8	–	3	–	0
Houston		–		7	–	3	–	0
Virginia Tech		–		7	–	3	–	0
Memphis State		–		6	–	3	–	0
Southern Miss		–		6	–	3	–	0
Dayton		–		6	–	3	–	1
Xavier		–		6	–	3	–	1
Miami (FL)		–		7	–	4	–	0
Buffalo		–		6	–	4	–	0
Navy		–		5	–	4	–	1
Holy Cross		–		5	–	5	–	0
Colorado State		–		4	–	5	–	1
Boston College		–		4	–	6	–	0
Georgia Tech		–		4	–	6	–	0
Villanova		–		4	–	6	–	0
Air Force		–		2	–	6	–	2
Tulane		–		3	–	7	–	0
San Jose State		–		2	–	7	–	0
Colgate		–		2	–	8	–	0
Pittsburgh		–		1	–	9	–	0
Rankings from AP Poll

The 1967 Syracuse Orangemen football team represented Syracuse University as an independent during the 1967 NCAA University Division football season. The Orangemen were led by 19th-year head coach Ben Schwartzwalder and played their home games at Archbold Stadium in Syracuse, New York. The team finished with an 8–2 record and were ranked 12th in final Coaches Poll (the AP Poll ranked only 10 teams at the time), but failed to receive an invitation to a bowl.

Tom Coughlin set the school's single-season pass receiving record. Larry Csonka was in his senior season and was named an All-American. He broke many of the school's rushing records, including some previously held by Ernie Davis, Jim Nance, Floyd Little, and Jim Brown.

In his three seasons at Syracuse, Csonka rushed for a school record 2,934 yards, rushed for 100 yards in 14 different games, and averaged 4.9 yards per carry. From 1965 to 1967, he ranked 19th, 9th and 5th in the nation in rushing. He was the Most Valuable Player in the East–West Shrine Game, the Hula Bowl, and the College All-Star Game.

== Schedule ==
Date	Opponent	Site	Result	Attendance	Source
September 23	Baylor	Archbold Stadium; Syracuse, NY	W 7–0	31,457	
September 30	West Virginia	Archbold Stadium; Syracuse, NY (rivalry)	W 23–6	28,435	
October 7	at Maryland	Byrd Stadium; College Park, MD	W 7–3	27,500	
October 14	at Navy	Navy–Marine Corps Memorial Stadium; Annapolis, MD	L 14–27	23,319	
October 21	California	Archbold Stadium; Syracuse, NY	W 20–14	32,557	
October 28	Penn State	Archbold Stadium; Syracuse, NY (rivalry)	L 20–29	41,731	
November 4	at Pittsburgh	Pitt Stadium; Pittsburgh, PA (rivalry)	W 14–7	28,704	
November 11	Holy Cross	Archbold Stadium; Syracuse, NY	W 41–7	32,041	
November 18	at Boston College	Alumni Stadium; Chestnut Hill, MA	W 32–20	16,200	
November 25	at No. 4 UCLA	Los Angeles Memorial Coliseum; Los Angeles, CA	W 32–14	36,177	
Rankings from Poll Poll released prior to the game

== 1967 team players in the NFL ==
Player	Round	Pick	Position	Club
Larry Csonka	1	8	Running back	Miami Dolphins
Dennis Fitzgibbons	11	287	Guard	San Francisco 49ers
Jim Cheyunski	12	305	Linebacker	New England Patriots
