= 1967 Pittsburgh Panthers football team =

American college football season

1967 Pittsburgh Panthers football
- Conference: Independent
- Record: 1–9
- Head coach: Dave Hart (2nd season)
- Home stadium: Pitt Stadium

1967 NCAA University Division independents football records
	Conf.			Overall
Team	W	L	T	W		L		T
Army		–		8	–	2	–	0
No. 5 Notre Dame		–		8	–	2	–	0
Syracuse		–		8	–	2	–	0
No. 10 Penn State		–		8	–	2	–	1
New Mexico State		–		7	–	2	–	1
UTEP		–		7	–	2	–	1
Utah State		–		7	–	2	–	1
Florida State		–		7	–	2	–	2
West Texas State		–		8	–	3	–	0
Houston		–		7	–	3	–	0
Virginia Tech		–		7	–	3	–	0
Memphis State		–		6	–	3	–	0
Southern Miss		–		6	–	3	–	0
Dayton		–		6	–	3	–	1
Xavier		–		6	–	3	–	1
Miami (FL)		–		7	–	4	–	0
Buffalo		–		6	–	4	–	0
Navy		–		5	–	4	–	1
Holy Cross		–		5	–	5	–	0
Colorado State		–		4	–	5	–	1
Boston College		–		4	–	6	–	0
Georgia Tech		–		4	–	6	–	0
Villanova		–		4	–	6	–	0
Air Force		–		2	–	6	–	2
Tulane		–		3	–	7	–	0
San Jose State		–		2	–	7	–	0
Colgate		–		2	–	8	–	0
Pittsburgh		–		1	–	9	–	0
Rankings from AP Poll

The 1967 Pittsburgh Panthers football team represented the University of Pittsburgh as an independent during the 1967 NCAA University Division football season. The team compiled a 1–9 record under head coach Dave Hart. The team's statistical leaders included Bob Bazylak with 679 passing yards and Gary Cramer with 312 rushing yards.

== Schedule ==
Date	Opponent	Site	Result	Attendance	Source
September 23	No. 6 UCLA	Pitt Stadium; Pittsburgh, PA	L 8–40	31,210	
September 30	at Illinois	Memorial Stadium; Champaign, IL	L 6–34	51,251	
October 7	at West Virginia	Mountaineer Field; Morgantown, WV (Backyard Brawl)	L 0–15	35,000	
October 14	at Wisconsin	Camp Randall Stadium; Madison, WI	W 13–11	46,995	
October 21	Miami (FL)	Pitt Stadium; Pittsburgh, PA	L 0–58	24,371	
October 28	Navy	Pitt Stadium; Pittsburgh, PA	L 21–22	19,957	
November 4	Syracuse	Pitt Stadium; Pittsburgh, PA (rivalry)	L 7–14	28,704	
November 11	No. 9 Notre Dame	Pitt Stadium; Pittsburgh, PA (rivalry)	L 0–38	54,705	
November 18	Army	Pitt Stadium; Pittsburgh, PA	L 12–21	22,310	
November 25	at Penn State	Beaver Stadium; University Park, PA (rivalry)	L 6–42	34,042	
Rankings from AP Poll released prior to the game
