= 1967 Penn State Nittany Lions football team =

American college football season

1967 Penn State Nittany Lions football

Eastern champion

Gator Bowl, T 17–17 vs. Florida State
- Conference: Independent

Ranking
- Coaches: No. 11
- AP: No. 10
- Record: 8–2–1
- Head coach: Joe Paterno (2nd season)
- Offensive scheme: I formation
- Defensive coordinator: Jim O'Hora (2nd season)
- Base defense: 4–3
- Captains: Bill Lenkaitis; Jim Litterelle
- Home stadium: Beaver Stadium

1967 NCAA University Division independents football records
	Conf.			Overall
Team	W	L	T	W		L		T
Army		–		8	–	2	–	0
No. 5 Notre Dame		–		8	–	2	–	0
Syracuse		–		8	–	2	–	0
No. 10 Penn State		–		8	–	2	–	1
New Mexico State		–		7	–	2	–	1
UTEP		–		7	–	2	–	1
Utah State		–		7	–	2	–	1
Florida State		–		7	–	2	–	2
West Texas State		–		8	–	3	–	0
Houston		–		7	–	3	–	0
Virginia Tech		–		7	–	3	–	0
Memphis State		–		6	–	3	–	0
Southern Miss		–		6	–	3	–	0
Dayton		–		6	–	3	–	1
Xavier		–		6	–	3	–	1
Miami (FL)		–		7	–	4	–	0
Buffalo		–		6	–	4	–	0
Navy		–		5	–	4	–	1
Holy Cross		–		5	–	5	–	0
Colorado State		–		4	–	5	–	1
Boston College		–		4	–	6	–	0
Georgia Tech		–		4	–	6	–	0
Villanova		–		4	–	6	–	0
Air Force		–		2	–	6	–	2
Tulane		–		3	–	7	–	0
San Jose State		–		2	–	7	–	0
Colgate		–		2	–	8	–	0
Pittsburgh		–		1	–	9	–	0
Rankings from AP Poll

The 1967 Penn State Nittany Lions football team represented the Pennsylvania State University as an independent during the 1967 NCAA University Division football season. The team was coached by Joe Paterno and played its home games in Beaver Stadium in University Park, Pennsylvania.

== Schedule ==
Date	Opponent	Site	TV	Result	Attendance	Source
September 23	at Navy	Navy–Marine Corps Memorial Stadium; Annapolis, MD	ABC	L 22–23	20,101	
September 29	at Miami (FL)	Miami Orange Bowl; Miami, FL		W 17–8	39,516	
October 7	No. 4 UCLA	Beaver Stadium; University Park, PA		L 15–17	48,233	
October 14	at Boston College	Alumni Stadium; Chestnut Hill, MA		W 50–28	15,500	
October 21	West Virginia^{†}	Beaver Stadium; University Park, PA (rivalry)		W 21–14	43,704–44,460	
October 28	at Syracuse	Archbold Stadium; Syracuse, NY (rivalry)		W 29–20	41,731	
November 4	at Maryland	Byrd Stadium; College Park, MD (rivalry)		W 38–3	34,700	
November 11	No. 3 NC State	Beaver Stadium; University Park, PA		W 13–8	46,497	
November 18	Ohio	Beaver Stadium; University Park, PA		W 35–14	23,000	
November 25	Pittsburgh	Beaver Stadium; University Park, PA (rivalry)		W 42–6	34,042	
December 30	vs. Florida State	Gator Bowl Stadium; Jacksonville, FL (Gator Bowl)	ABC	T 17–17	68,019	
^{†}Homecoming; Rankings from AP Poll released prior to the game

== Roster ==
1967 Penn State Nittany Lions football team roster
Players
Coaches
Offense

Pos.	#	Name	Class
OT	73	Dave Bradley	Jr
OT	77	Rich Buzin	Sr
WR	23	Bob Campbell	Jr
RB		Fran Ganter	Fr
C	53	Bill Lenkaitis	Jr
QB	25	Tom Sherman	Sr

Defense

Pos.	#	Name	Class
DT	79	Mike McBath	Sr

Special teams

Pos.	#	Name	Class

Head coach

- Joe Paterno

Coordinators/assistant coaches

- Earl Bruce
- Joe McMullen
- Jim O'Hora
- Frank Patrick
- Bob Phillips
- Dan Radakovich
- George Welsh
- J. T. White

Legend

- (C) Team captain
- (S) Suspended
- (I) Ineligible
- Injured
- Redshirt

== NFL/AFL draft ==
Three Nittany Lions were drafted in the 1968 NFL/AFL draft.

Round	Pick	Overall	Name	Position	Team
2nd	14	41	Rich Buzin	Offensive tackle	New York Giants
2nd	16	43	Bill Lenkaitis	Center	San Diego Chargers
5th	8	119	Mike McBath	Defensive end	Buffalo Bills
