= 1967 Utah State Aggies football team =

American college football season

1967 Utah State Aggies football
- Conference: Independent
- Record: 7–2–1
- Head coach: Chuck Mills (1st season)
- Home stadium: Romney Stadium

1967 NCAA University Division independents football records
	Conf.			Overall
Team	W	L	T	W		L		T
Army		–		8	–	2	–	0
No. 5 Notre Dame		–		8	–	2	–	0
Syracuse		–		8	–	2	–	0
No. 10 Penn State		–		8	–	2	–	1
New Mexico State		–		7	–	2	–	1
UTEP		–		7	–	2	–	1
Utah State		–		7	–	2	–	1
Florida State		–		7	–	2	–	2
West Texas State		–		8	–	3	–	0
Houston		–		7	–	3	–	0
Virginia Tech		–		7	–	3	–	0
Memphis State		–		6	–	3	–	0
Southern Miss		–		6	–	3	–	0
Dayton		–		6	–	3	–	1
Xavier		–		6	–	3	–	1
Miami (FL)		–		7	–	4	–	0
Buffalo		–		6	–	4	–	0
Navy		–		5	–	4	–	1
Holy Cross		–		5	–	5	–	0
Colorado State		–		4	–	5	–	1
Boston College		–		4	–	6	–	0
Georgia Tech		–		4	–	6	–	0
Villanova		–		4	–	6	–	0
Air Force		–		2	–	6	–	2
Tulane		–		3	–	7	–	0
San Jose State		–		2	–	7	–	0
Colgate		–		2	–	8	–	0
Pittsburgh		–		1	–	9	–	0
Rankings from AP Poll

The 1967 Utah State Aggies football team was an American football team that represented Utah State University as an independent during the 1967 NCAA University Division football season. In their first season under head coach Chuck Mills, the Aggies compiled a 7–2–1 record and outscored their opponents 205 to 143. This was the Aggies' final season at the original Romney Stadium; they moved to a larger venue of the same name in 1968, located several blocks north.

The team's statistical leaders included John Pappas with 1,424 passing yards, Altie Taylor with 717 rushing yards, Mike O'Shea with 599 receiving yards, Jim Murphy with 43 points scored (eight field goals and 19 extra points), and Bill Staley with 132 total tackles.

Hired in February, Mills was previously the offensive coordinator with the Kansas City Chiefs, the champions of the American Football League (AFL). Tony Knap had resigned in January for an assistant coaching position with the BC Lions in the Canadian Football League (CFL).

== Schedule ==
Date	Opponent	Site	Result	Attendance	Source
September 16	at Wichita State	Veterans Field; Wichita, KS	T 3–3	11,292	
September 23	at West Texas State	Buffalo Bowl; Canyon, TX	W 44–27	11,900	
September 30	at New Mexico State	Memorial Stadium; Las Cruces, NM	L 9–10	12,000	
October 7	vs. Memphis State	Ute Stadium; Salt Lake City, UT	W 28–14	10,048	
October 14	Pacific (CA)	Romney Stadium; Logan, UT	W 7–6	14,662	
October 21	at Colorado State	Colorado Field; Fort Collins, CO	L 14–17	14,178	
November 4	BYU	Romney Stadium; Logan, UT (rivalry)	W 30–9	15,602	
November 11	Montana	Romney Stadium; Logan, UT	W 20–14	8,396–8,400	
November 18	at Utah	Ute Stadium; Salt Lake City, UT (rivalry)	W 19–18	23,216	
November 25	at No. 1 San Diego State	San Diego Stadium; San Diego, CA	W 31–25	44,317	

== NFL/AFL draft ==
Fullback MacArthur Lane was the 13th overall selection of the 1968 NFL/AFL draft, taken by the St. Louis Cardinals, and played eleven seasons in the National Football League (NFL).
