= 1967 Virginia Cavaliers football team =

American college football season

1967 Virginia Cavaliers football
- Conference: Atlantic Coast Conference
- Record: 5–5 (3–3 ACC)
- Head coach: George Blackburn (3rd season)
- Captain: Malcolm McGregor
- Home stadium: Scott Stadium

1967 Atlantic Coast Conference football standings
	Conf.					Overall
Team	W		L		T	W		L		T
Clemson $	6	–	0	–	0	6	–	4	–	0
NC State	5	–	1	–	0	9	–	2	–	0
South Carolina	4	–	2	–	0	5	–	5	–	0
Virginia	3	–	3	–	0	5	–	5	–	0
Wake Forest	3	–	4	–	0	4	–	6	–	0
Duke	2	–	4	–	0	4	–	6	–	0
North Carolina	2	–	5	–	0	2	–	8	–	0
Maryland	0	–	6	–	0	0	–	9	–	0
$ – Conference champion

The 1967 Virginia Cavaliers football team represented the University of Virginia during the 1967 NCAA University Division football season. The Cavaliers were led by third-year head coach George Blackburn and played their home games at Scott Stadium in Charlottesville, Virginia. They competed as members of the Atlantic Coast Conference, finishing in fourth.

== Schedule ==
Date	Opponent	Site	Result	Attendance	Source
September 23	at Army*	Michie Stadium; West Point, NY	L 7–26	28,500	
September 30	Buffalo*	Scott Stadium; Charlottesville, VA	W 35–12	16,000	
October 7	at Wake Forest	Bowman Gray Stadium; Winston-Salem, NC	W 14–12	11,000	
October 14	Duke^{†}	Scott Stadium; Charlottesville, VA	L 6–13	25,000	
October 21	at South Carolina	Carolina Stadium; Columbia, SC	L 23–24	34,159	
October 28	VMI*	Scott Stadium; Charlottesville, VA	L 13–18	18,500	
November 4	No. 4 NC State	Scott Stadium; Charlottesville, VA	L 8–30	16,000	
November 11	North Carolina	Scott Stadium; Charlottesville, VA (South's Oldest Rivalry)	W 40–17	19,000	
November 18	at Tulane*	Tulane Stadium; New Orleans, LA	W 14–10	17,712	
November 25	at Maryland	Byrd Stadium; College Park, MD (rivalry)	W 12–7	24,200	
*Non-conference game; ^{†}Homecoming; Rankings from AP Poll released prior to the game
