= 1967 South Carolina Gamecocks football team =

American college football season

1967 South Carolina Gamecocks football
- Conference: Atlantic Coast Conference
- Record: 5–5 (4–2 ACC)
- Head coach: Paul Dietzel (2nd season)
- Captains: Don Somma; Joe Komoroski
- Home stadium: Carolina Stadium

1967 Atlantic Coast Conference football standings
	Conf.					Overall
Team	W		L		T	W		L		T
Clemson $	6	–	0	–	0	6	–	4	–	0
NC State	5	–	1	–	0	9	–	2	–	0
South Carolina	4	–	2	–	0	5	–	5	–	0
Virginia	3	–	3	–	0	5	–	5	–	0
Wake Forest	3	–	4	–	0	4	–	6	–	0
Duke	2	–	4	–	0	4	–	6	–	0
North Carolina	2	–	5	–	0	2	–	8	–	0
Maryland	0	–	6	–	0	0	–	9	–	0
$ – Conference champion

The 1967 South Carolina Gamecocks football team represented the University of South Carolina as a member of the Atlantic Coast Conference (ACC) during the 1967 NCAA University Division football season. Led by second-year head coach Paul Dietzel, the Gamecocks compiled an overall record of 5–5 with a mark of 4–2 in conference play, placing third in the ACC. The team played home games at Carolina Stadium in Columbia, South Carolina.

In Dietzel's second year, the Gamecocks made a four-win improvement over the previous season, but still did not finish with a winning record.

== Schedule ==
Date	Opponent	Site	Result	Attendance	Source
September 16	Iowa State*	Carolina Stadium; Columbia, SC	W 34–3	21,713–26,443	
September 23	North Carolina	Carolina Stadium; Columbia, SC (rivalry)	W 16–10	39,135	
September 30	at Duke	Wallace Wade Stadium; Durham, NC	W 21–17	25,000	
October 7	at No. 5 Georgia*	Sanford Stadium; Athens, GA (rivalry)	L 0–21	58,182	
October 14	at Florida State*	Doak Campbell Stadium; Tallahassee, FL	L 0–17	33,022	
October 21	Virginia	Carolina Stadium; Columbia, SC	W 24–23	34,159	
October 28	Maryland	Carolina Stadium; Columbia, SC	W 31–0	33,427	
November 4	at Wake Forest	Bowman Gray Stadium; Winston-Salem, NC	L 21–35	13,000	
November 18	at Alabama*	Denny Stadium; Tuscaloosa, AL	L 0–17	46,105	
November 25	Clemson	Carolina Stadium; Columbia, SC (rivalry)	L 12–23	43,338	
*Non-conference game; Rankings from AP Poll released prior to the game
