= 1967 San Jose State Spartans football team =

American college football season

1967 San Jose State Spartans football
- Conference: Independent
- Record: 2–7
- Head coach: Harry Anderson (3rd season)
- Home stadium: Spartan Stadium

1967 NCAA University Division independents football records
	Conf.			Overall
Team	W	L	T	W		L		T
Army		–		8	–	2	–	0
No. 5 Notre Dame		–		8	–	2	–	0
Syracuse		–		8	–	2	–	0
No. 10 Penn State		–		8	–	2	–	1
New Mexico State		–		7	–	2	–	1
UTEP		–		7	–	2	–	1
Utah State		–		7	–	2	–	1
Florida State		–		7	–	2	–	2
West Texas State		–		8	–	3	–	0
Houston		–		7	–	3	–	0
Virginia Tech		–		7	–	3	–	0
Memphis State		–		6	–	3	–	0
Southern Miss		–		6	–	3	–	0
Dayton		–		6	–	3	–	1
Xavier		–		6	–	3	–	1
Miami (FL)		–		7	–	4	–	0
Buffalo		–		6	–	4	–	0
Navy		–		5	–	4	–	1
Holy Cross		–		5	–	5	–	0
Colorado State		–		4	–	5	–	1
Boston College		–		4	–	6	–	0
Georgia Tech		–		4	–	6	–	0
Villanova		–		4	–	6	–	0
Air Force		–		2	–	6	–	2
Tulane		–		3	–	7	–	0
San Jose State		–		2	–	7	–	0
Colgate		–		2	–	8	–	0
Pittsburgh		–		1	–	9	–	0
Rankings from AP Poll

The 1967 San Jose State Spartans football team represented San Jose State College—now known as San Jose State University—as an independent during the 1967 NCAA University Division football season. Led by third-year head coach Harry Anderson, the Spartans compiled a record of 2–7 and were outscored by opponents 286 to 166. The team played home games at Spartan Stadium in San Jose, California.

The Spartans' home opener against UTEP was canceled after student protests against San Jose State's racist policies.

== Schedule ==
Date	Opponent	Site	Result	Attendance	Source
September 16	at Arizona State	Sun Devil Stadium; Tempe, AZ	L 16–27	36,742	
September 23	UTEP	Spartan Stadium; San Jose, CA	Canceled		
September 30	at Stanford	Stanford Stadium; Stanford, CA (rivalry)	L 14–28	37,000	
October 14	at West Texas State	Buffalo Bowl; Canyon, TX	L 14–28	11,500	
October 21	New Mexico	Spartan Stadium; San Jose, California	W 52–14	13,700	
October 28	Pacific (CA)	Spartan Stadium; San Jose, CA (Victory Bell)	L 14–34	13,300	
November 4	No. 8 Wyoming	Spartan Stadium; San Jose, CA	L 7–28	17,300	
November 11	at California	California Memorial Stadium; Berkeley, CA	L 6–30	25,000	
November 18	at Fresno State	Ratcliffe Stadium; Fresno, CA (rivalry)	W 35–30	4,500	
November 25	at BYU	Cougar Stadium; Provo, UT	L 8–67	19,895	
Rankings from AP Poll released prior to the game

== Team players in the NFL/AFL ==
The following San Jose State players were selected in the 1968 NFL/AFL draft.

Player	Position	Round	Overall	NFL team
Mike Spitzer	Defensive end	6	148	Detroit Lions
Danny Holman	Quarterback	8	201	Pittsburgh Steelers
Roy Hall	Tackle	16	410	Atlanta Falcons
Walt Blackledge	Flanker	16	432	Baltimore Colts
