= 1967 Colgate Red Raiders football team =

American college football season

1967 Colgate Red Raiders football
- Conference: Independent
- Record: 2–8
- Head coach: Hal Lahar (11th season)
- Captain: Donald Mooradian
- Home stadium: Andy Kerr Stadium

1967 NCAA University Division independents football records
	Conf.			Overall
Team	W	L	T	W		L		T
Army		–		8	–	2	–	0
No. 5 Notre Dame		–		8	–	2	–	0
Syracuse		–		8	–	2	–	0
No. 10 Penn State		–		8	–	2	–	1
New Mexico State		–		7	–	2	–	1
UTEP		–		7	–	2	–	1
Utah State		–		7	–	2	–	1
Florida State		–		7	–	2	–	2
West Texas State		–		8	–	3	–	0
Houston		–		7	–	3	–	0
Virginia Tech		–		7	–	3	–	0
Memphis State		–		6	–	3	–	0
Southern Miss		–		6	–	3	–	0
Dayton		–		6	–	3	–	1
Xavier		–		6	–	3	–	1
Miami (FL)		–		7	–	4	–	0
Buffalo		–		6	–	4	–	0
Navy		–		5	–	4	–	1
Holy Cross		–		5	–	5	–	0
Colorado State		–		4	–	5	–	1
Boston College		–		4	–	6	–	0
Georgia Tech		–		4	–	6	–	0
Villanova		–		4	–	6	–	0
Air Force		–		2	–	6	–	2
Tulane		–		3	–	7	–	0
San Jose State		–		2	–	7	–	0
Colgate		–		2	–	8	–	0
Pittsburgh		–		1	–	9	–	0
Rankings from AP Poll

The 1967 Colgate Red Raiders football team was an American football team that represented Colgate University as an independent during the 1967 NCAA University Division football season. In its sixth consecutive season under head coach Hal Lahar (his 11th overall), the team compiled a 2–8 record. Donald Mooradian was the team captain.

The team played its home games at Andy Kerr Stadium in Hamilton, New York.

== Schedule ==
Date	Opponent	Site	Result	Attendance	Source
September 23	Boston University	Andy Kerr Stadium; Hamilton, NY	L 14–20	6,500	
September 30	at Columbia	Baker Field; New York, NY	L 14–17	11,000	
October 7	Cornell	Andy Kerr Stadium; Hamilton, NY (rivalry)	L 7–23	13,859	
October 14	at Holy Cross	Fitton Field; Worcester, MA	L 0–17	16,333	
October 21	at Princeton	Palmer Stadium; Princeton, NJ	L 0–28	22,000	
October 28	at Brown	Brown Stadium; Providence, RI	L 0–7	8,400	
November 4	at Lehigh	Taylor Stadium; Bethlehem, PA	W 20–7	7,600	
November 11	Bucknell	Andy Kerr Stadium; Hamilton, NY	W 38–0	4,500–5,000	
November 18	at Buffalo	Rotary Field; Buffalo, NY	L 0–31	6,646	
November 25	at Rutgers	Rutgers Stadium; Piscataway, NJ	L 28–31	10,500	

== Leading players ==
Statistical leaders for the 1967 Red Raiders included:

- Rushing: Ronald Burton, 453 yards and 3 touchdowns on 146 attempts
- Passing: Ronald Burton, 954 yards, 66 completions and 2 touchdowns on 149 attempts
- Receiving: Dean Taylor, 255 yards on 18 receptions
- Total offense: Ronald Burton, 1,407 yards (954 passing, 453 rushing)
- Scoring: Ronald Burton, 30 points from 5 touchdowns
- All-purpose yards: Marvin Hubbard, 613 yards (329 rushing, 152 receiving, 132 kickoff returning)
