= 1967 Dayton Flyers football team =

American college football season

1967 Dayton Flyers football
- Conference: Independent
- Record: 6–3–1
- Head coach: John McVay (3rd season)
- Home stadium: Baujan Field

1967 NCAA University Division independents football records
	Conf.			Overall
Team	W	L	T	W		L		T
Army		–		8	–	2	–	0
No. 5 Notre Dame		–		8	–	2	–	0
Syracuse		–		8	–	2	–	0
No. 10 Penn State		–		8	–	2	–	1
New Mexico State		–		7	–	2	–	1
UTEP		–		7	–	2	–	1
Utah State		–		7	–	2	–	1
Florida State		–		7	–	2	–	2
West Texas State		–		8	–	3	–	0
Houston		–		7	–	3	–	0
Virginia Tech		–		7	–	3	–	0
Memphis State		–		6	–	3	–	0
Southern Miss		–		6	–	3	–	0
Dayton		–		6	–	3	–	1
Xavier		–		6	–	3	–	1
Miami (FL)		–		7	–	4	–	0
Buffalo		–		6	–	4	–	0
Navy		–		5	–	4	–	1
Holy Cross		–		5	–	5	–	0
Colorado State		–		4	–	5	–	1
Boston College		–		4	–	6	–	0
Georgia Tech		–		4	–	6	–	0
Villanova		–		4	–	6	–	0
Air Force		–		2	–	6	–	2
Tulane		–		3	–	7	–	0
San Jose State		–		2	–	7	–	0
Colgate		–		2	–	8	–	0
Pittsburgh		–		1	–	9	–	0
Rankings from AP Poll

The 1967 Dayton Flyers football team represented the University of Dayton as an independent during the 1967 NCAA University Division football season. In their third season under head coach John McVay, the Flyers compiled a 6–3–1 record. Dayton played their home games at Baujan Field in Dayton, Ohio.

== Schedule ==
Date	Opponent	Site	Result	Attendance	Source
September 16	Eastern Kentucky	Baujan Field; Dayton, OH	W 16–0	14,000	
September 23	at Cincinnati	Nippert Stadium; Cincinnati, OH	W 27–13	20,500	
September 30	Bowling Green	Baujan Field; Dayton, OH	L 0–7	14,300	
October 7	at Louisville	Fairgrounds Stadium; Louisville, KY	L 7–29	15,012	
October 14	at Southern Illinois	McAndrew Stadium; Carbondale, IL	W 34–14	4,500	
October 21	Temple	Baujan Field; Dayton, OH	W 56–6	14,208	
October 28	Ohio	Baujan Field; Dayton, OH	W 10–9	10,800	
November 4	at Xavier	Xavier Stadium; Cincinnati, OH	T 7–7	11,472	
November 11	Miami (OH)	Baujan Field; Dayton, OH	W 7–6	8,760	
November 18	at Toledo	Glass Bowl; Toledo, OH	L 7–21	10,216	
