= 1967 Wake Forest Demon Deacons football team =

American college football season

1967 Wake Forest Demon Deacons football
- Conference: Atlantic Coast Conference
- Record: 4–6 (3–4 ACC)
- Head coach: Bill Tate (4th season)
- Captain: Game captains
- Home stadium: Bowman Gray Stadium

1967 Atlantic Coast Conference football standings
	Conf.					Overall
Team	W		L		T	W		L		T
Clemson $	6	–	0	–	0	6	–	4	–	0
NC State	5	–	1	–	0	9	–	2	–	0
South Carolina	4	–	2	–	0	5	–	5	–	0
Virginia	3	–	3	–	0	5	–	5	–	0
Wake Forest	3	–	4	–	0	4	–	6	–	0
Duke	2	–	4	–	0	4	–	6	–	0
North Carolina	2	–	5	–	0	2	–	8	–	0
Maryland	0	–	6	–	0	0	–	9	–	0
$ – Conference champion

The 1967 Wake Forest Demon Deacons football team was an American football team that represented Wake Forest University during the 1967 NCAA University Division football season. In their fourth season under head coach Bill Tate, the Demon Deacons compiled a 4–6 record and finished in fifth place in the Atlantic Coast Conference.

== Schedule ==
Date	Opponent	Site	Result	Attendance	Source
September 16	vs. Duke	Carter Stadium; Raleigh, NC (rivalry)	L 13–31	22,450	
September 23	at Clemson	Memorial Stadium; Clemson, SC	L 6–23	35,706	
September 29	at No. 3 Houston*	Houston Astrodome; Houston, TX	L 6–50	41,769	
October 7	Virginia	Bowman Gray Stadium; Winston-Salem, NC	L 12–14	11,000	
October 14	at Memphis State*	Memphis Memorial Stadium; Memphis, TN	L 10–42	17,030	
October 21	at No. 5 NC State	Carter Stadium; Raleigh, NC (rivalry)	L 7–24	30,300	
October 28	at North Carolina	Kenan Memorial Stadium; Chapel Hill, NC (rivalry)	W 20–10	36,000	
November 4	South Carolina	Bowman Gray Stadium; Winston-Salem, NC	W 35–21	13,000	
November 11	at Tulsa*	Skelly Stadium; Tulsa, OK	W 31–24	23,500	
November 17	Maryland	Bowman Gray Stadium; Winston-Salem, NC	W 35–17	14,500	
*Non-conference game; Rankings from AP Poll released prior to the game

== Team leaders ==
Category	Team Leader	Att/Cth	Yds
Passing	Freddie Summers	77/159	909
Rushing	Freddie Summers	179	510
Receiving	Rick Decker	29	352
