= 1967 Maryland Terrapins football team =

American college football season

1967 Maryland Terrapins football
- Conference: Atlantic Coast Conference
- Record: 0–9 (0–6 ACC)
- Head coach: Bob Ward (1st season)
- Home stadium: Byrd Stadium

1967 Atlantic Coast Conference football standings
	Conf.					Overall
Team	W		L		T	W		L		T
Clemson $	6	–	0	–	0	6	–	4	–	0
NC State	5	–	1	–	0	9	–	2	–	0
South Carolina	4	–	2	–	0	5	–	5	–	0
Virginia	3	–	3	–	0	5	–	5	–	0
Wake Forest	3	–	4	–	0	4	–	6	–	0
Duke	2	–	4	–	0	4	–	6	–	0
North Carolina	2	–	5	–	0	2	–	8	–	0
Maryland	0	–	6	–	0	0	–	9	–	0
$ – Conference champion

The 1967 Maryland Terrapins football team represented the University of Maryland in the 1967 NCAA University Division football season. In their first season under head coach Bob Ward, the Terrapins compiled a 0–9 record (0–6 in conference), finished in last place in the Atlantic Coast Conference, and were outscored by their opponents 231 to 46. The team's statistical leaders included Chuck Drimal with 669 passing yards, Billy Lovett with 499 rushing yards, and Rick Carlson with 309 receiving yards.

== Schedule ==
Date	Opponent	Site	Result	Attendance	Source
September 30	at Oklahoma*	Oklahoma Memorial Stadium; Norman, OK	L 0–35	46,215	
October 7	Syracuse*	Byrd Stadium; College Park, MD	L 3–7	27,500	
October 14	No. 9 NC State	Byrd Stadium; College Park, MD	L 9–31	27,100	
October 21	at North Carolina	Kenan Memorial Stadium; Chapel Hill, NC	L 0–14	32,000	
October 28	at South Carolina	Carolina Stadium; Columbia, SC	L 0–31	33,427	
November 4	Penn State*	Byrd Stadium; College Park, MD (rivalry)	L 3–38	34,700	
November 11	at Clemson	Memorial Stadium; Clemson, SC	L 7–28	27,537	
November 17	at Wake Forest	Bowman Gray Stadium; Winston-Salem, NC	L 17–35	14,500	
November 25	Virginia	Byrd Stadium; College Park, MD (rivalry)	L 7–12	24,200	
*Non-conference game; Rankings from AP Poll released prior to the game

== Roster ==
1967 Maryland Terrapins football team roster
Players
Coaches
Offense

Pos.	#	Name	Class
QB	12	Alan Pastrana	Jr
WR	45	Billy Van Heusen	Sr

Defense

Pos.	#	Name	Class

Special teams

Pos.	#	Name	Class

Head coach

- Bob Ward

Coordinators/assistant coaches

Legend

- (C) Team captain
- (S) Suspended
- (I) Ineligible
- Injured
- Redshirt
