= 1967 Boston College Eagles football team =

American college football season

1967 Boston College Eagles football
- Conference: Independent
- Record: 4–6
- Head coach: Jim Miller (6th season)
- Captain: Joe DiVito
- Home stadium: Alumni Stadium

1967 NCAA University Division independents football records
| | Conf. | | | Overall |
| Team | W | L | T | W | | L | | T |
|---|---|---|---|---|---|---|---|---|
| Army | | – | | 8 | – | 2 | – | 0 |
| No. 5 Notre Dame | | – | | 8 | – | 2 | – | 0 |
| Syracuse | | – | | 8 | – | 2 | – | 0 |
| No. 10 Penn State | | – | | 8 | – | 2 | – | 1 |
| New Mexico State | | – | | 7 | – | 2 | – | 1 |
| UTEP | | – | | 7 | – | 2 | – | 1 |
| Utah State | | – | | 7 | – | 2 | – | 1 |
| Florida State | | – | | 7 | – | 2 | – | 2 |
| West Texas State | | – | | 8 | – | 3 | – | 0 |
| Houston | | – | | 7 | – | 3 | – | 0 |
| Virginia Tech | | – | | 7 | – | 3 | – | 0 |
| Memphis State | | – | | 6 | – | 3 | – | 0 |
| Southern Miss | | – | | 6 | – | 3 | – | 0 |
| Dayton | | – | | 6 | – | 3 | – | 1 |
| Xavier | | – | | 6 | – | 3 | – | 1 |
| Miami (FL) | | – | | 7 | – | 4 | – | 0 |
| Buffalo | | – | | 6 | – | 4 | – | 0 |
| Navy | | – | | 5 | – | 4 | – | 1 |
| Holy Cross | | – | | 5 | – | 5 | – | 0 |
| Colorado State | | – | | 4 | – | 5 | – | 1 |
| Boston College | | – | | 4 | – | 6 | – | 0 |
| Georgia Tech | | – | | 4 | – | 6 | – | 0 |
| Villanova | | – | | 4 | – | 6 | – | 0 |
| Air Force | | – | | 2 | – | 6 | – | 2 |
| Tulane | | – | | 3 | – | 7 | – | 0 |
| San Jose State | | – | | 2 | – | 7 | – | 0 |
| Colgate | | – | | 2 | – | 8 | – | 0 |
| Pittsburgh | | – | | 1 | – | 9 | – | 0 |
Rankings from AP Poll

The 1967 Boston College Eagles football team represented Boston College as an independent during the 1967 NCAA University Division football season. Led by Jim Miller in his sixth and final season as head coach, the Eagles compiled a record of 4–6 for the second consecutive year. Boston College played home games at Alumni Stadium in Chestnut Hill, Massachusetts. Miller resigned at the end of the season, finishing with an overall record of 34–24 in six seasons at Boston College.

== Schedule ==
| Date | Opponent | Site | Result | Attendance | Source |
|---|---|---|---|---|---|
| September 23 | at Villanova | Villanova Stadium; Villanova, PA | W 27–24 | 12,025 | |
| September 30 | Army | Alumni Stadium; Chestnut Hill, MA | L 10–21 | 26,000 | |
| October 14 | Penn State | Alumni Stadium; Chestnut Hill, MA | L 28–50 | 15,500 | |
| October 21 | Buffalo | Alumni Stadium; Chestnut Hill, MA | L 14–26 | 15,000 | |
| October 28 | Maine | Alumni Stadium; Chestnut Hill, MA | W 56–0 | 10,000 | |
| November 4 | at Cincinnati | Nippert Stadium; Cincinnati, OH | L 21–27 | 12,500 | |
| November 11 | VMI | Alumni Stadium; Chestnut Hill, MA | L 13–26 | 14,500 | |
| November 18 | Syracuse | Alumni Stadium; Chestnut Hill, MA | L 20–32 | 16,200 | |
| November 25 | UMass | Alumni Stadium; Chestnut Hill, MA (rivalry) | W 25–0 | 16,200 | |
| December 2 | at Holy Cross | Fitton Field; Worcester, MA (rivalry) | W 13–6 | 25,000 | |
