= 1967 Navy Midshipmen football team =

American college football season

1967 Navy Midshipmen football
- Conference: Independent
- Record: 5–4–1
- Head coach: Bill Elias (3rd season)
- Captain: Bill Dow
- Home stadium: Navy–Marine Corps Memorial Stadium

1967 NCAA University Division independents football records
| | Conf. | | | Overall |
| Team | W | L | T | W | | L | | T |
|---|---|---|---|---|---|---|---|---|
| Army | | – | | 8 | – | 2 | – | 0 |
| No. 5 Notre Dame | | – | | 8 | – | 2 | – | 0 |
| Syracuse | | – | | 8 | – | 2 | – | 0 |
| No. 10 Penn State | | – | | 8 | – | 2 | – | 1 |
| New Mexico State | | – | | 7 | – | 2 | – | 1 |
| UTEP | | – | | 7 | – | 2 | – | 1 |
| Utah State | | – | | 7 | – | 2 | – | 1 |
| Florida State | | – | | 7 | – | 2 | – | 2 |
| West Texas State | | – | | 8 | – | 3 | – | 0 |
| Houston | | – | | 7 | – | 3 | – | 0 |
| Virginia Tech | | – | | 7 | – | 3 | – | 0 |
| Memphis State | | – | | 6 | – | 3 | – | 0 |
| Southern Miss | | – | | 6 | – | 3 | – | 0 |
| Dayton | | – | | 6 | – | 3 | – | 1 |
| Xavier | | – | | 6 | – | 3 | – | 1 |
| Miami (FL) | | – | | 7 | – | 4 | – | 0 |
| Buffalo | | – | | 6 | – | 4 | – | 0 |
| Navy | | – | | 5 | – | 4 | – | 1 |
| Holy Cross | | – | | 5 | – | 5 | – | 0 |
| Colorado State | | – | | 4 | – | 5 | – | 1 |
| Boston College | | – | | 4 | – | 6 | – | 0 |
| Georgia Tech | | – | | 4 | – | 6 | – | 0 |
| Villanova | | – | | 4 | – | 6 | – | 0 |
| Air Force | | – | | 2 | – | 6 | – | 2 |
| Tulane | | – | | 3 | – | 7 | – | 0 |
| San Jose State | | – | | 2 | – | 7 | – | 0 |
| Colgate | | – | | 2 | – | 8 | – | 0 |
| Pittsburgh | | – | | 1 | – | 9 | – | 0 |
Rankings from AP Poll

The 1967 Navy Midshipmen football team represented the United States Naval Academy (USNA) as an independent during the 1967 NCAA University Division football season. The team was led by third-year head coach Bill Elias.

== Schedule ==
| Date | Time | Opponent | Site | Result | Attendance | Source |
|---|---|---|---|---|---|---|
| September 23 | | Penn State | Navy–Marine Corps Memorial Stadium; Annapolis, MD | W 23–22 | 20,101 | |
| September 30 | | at Rice | Rice Stadium; Houston, TX | L 7–21 | 31,000 | |
| October 7 | | at Michigan | Michigan Stadium; Ann Arbor, MI | W 26–21 | 72,361 | |
| October 14 | | Syracuse | Navy–Marine Corps Memorial Stadium; Annapolis, MD | W 27–14 | 23,319 | |
| October 21 | | William & Mary^{†} | Navy–Marine Corps Memorial Stadium; Annapolis, MD | L 16–27 | 19,542 | |
| October 28 | | at Pittsburgh | Pitt Stadium; Pittsburgh, PA | W 22–21 | 19,957 | |
| November 4 | 2:30 p.m. | at No. 10 Notre Dame | Notre Dame Stadium; Notre Dame, IN (rivalry) | L 14–43 | 59,075 | |
| November 11 | | vs. Duke | Foreman Field; Norfolk, VA (Oyster Bowl) | L 16–35 | 30,000 | |
| November 18 | | Vanderbilt^{†} | Navy–Marine Corps Memorial Stadium; Annapolis, MD | T 35–35 | 18,054 | |
| December 2 | | vs. Army | John F. Kennedy Stadium; Philadelphia, PA (Army–Navy Game) | W 19–14 | 102,000 | |
^{†}Homecoming; Rankings from AP Poll released prior to the game; All times are in Eastern time

== Roster ==
1967 Navy Midshipmen football team roster
| Players | | | Coaches |
|---|---|---|---|
| Offense: Pos. / # / Name / Class; QB / / John Cartwright / Sr | Defense: Pos. / # / Name / Class | Special teams: Pos. / # / Name / Class | Head coach: Bill Elias; Coordinators/assistant coaches Legend: (C) Team captain; (S) Suspended; (I) Ineligible; Injured; Redshirt |
