= 1967 Air Force Falcons football team =

American college football season

1967 Air Force Falcons football
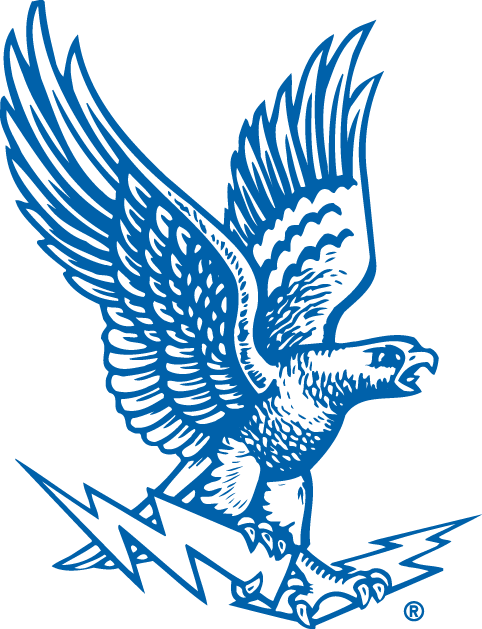
- Conference: Independent
- Record: 2–6–2
- Head coach: Ben Martin (10th season)
- Captain: Neal Starkey
- Home stadium: Falcon Stadium

1967 NCAA University Division independents football records
	Conf.			Overall
Team	W	L	T	W		L		T
Army		–		8	–	2	–	0
No. 5 Notre Dame		–		8	–	2	–	0
Syracuse		–		8	–	2	–	0
No. 10 Penn State		–		8	–	2	–	1
New Mexico State		–		7	–	2	–	1
UTEP		–		7	–	2	–	1
Utah State		–		7	–	2	–	1
Florida State		–		7	–	2	–	2
West Texas State		–		8	–	3	–	0
Houston		–		7	–	3	–	0
Virginia Tech		–		7	–	3	–	0
Memphis State		–		6	–	3	–	0
Southern Miss		–		6	–	3	–	0
Dayton		–		6	–	3	–	1
Xavier		–		6	–	3	–	1
Miami (FL)		–		7	–	4	–	0
Buffalo		–		6	–	4	–	0
Navy		–		5	–	4	–	1
Holy Cross		–		5	–	5	–	0
Colorado State		–		4	–	5	–	1
Boston College		–		4	–	6	–	0
Georgia Tech		–		4	–	6	–	0
Villanova		–		4	–	6	–	0
Air Force		–		2	–	6	–	2
Tulane		–		3	–	7	–	0
San Jose State		–		2	–	7	–	0
Colgate		–		2	–	8	–	0
Pittsburgh		–		1	–	9	–	0
Rankings from AP Poll

The 1967 Air Force Falcons football team represented the United States Air Force Academy as an independent during the 1967 NCAA University Division football season. Led by tenth-year head coach Ben Martin, the Falcons compiled a record of 2–6–2 and were outscored by their opponents 173–86. Air Force played their home games at Falcon Stadium in Colorado Springs, Colorado.

== Schedule ==
Date	Opponent	Site	Result	Attendance	Source
September 16	at Oklahoma State	Lewis Field; Stillwater, OK	T 0–0	30,000	
September 23	at Wyoming	War Memorial Stadium; Laramie, WY	L 10–37	21,623	
September 30	Washington	Falcon Stadium; Colorado Springs, CO	L 7–30	34,739	
October 7	at California	California Memorial Stadium; Berkeley, CA	L 12–14	35,000	
October 14	North Carolina	Falcon Stadium; Colorado Springs, CO	W 10–8	36,624	
October 21	at Tulane	Tulane Stadium; New Orleans, LA	W 13–10	20,045–20,245	
October 28	Colorado State	Falcon Stadium; Colorado Springs, CO (rivalry)	T 17–17	27,595	
November 4	Army	Falcon Stadium; Colorado Springs, CO (rivalry)	L 7–10	49,536	
November 18	at Arizona	Arizona Stadium; Tucson, AZ	L 10–14	27,300	
November 25	No. 17 Colorado	Falcon Stadium; Colorado Springs, CO	L 0–33	28,835	
Rankings from AP Poll released prior to the game
