= 1967 Buffalo Bulls football team =

American college football season

1967 Buffalo Bulls football
- Conference: Independent
- Record: 6–4
- Head coach: Doc Urich (2nd season)
- Captains: Ted Gibbons; Rick Wells
- Home stadium: Rotary Field

1967 NCAA University Division independents football records
	Conf.			Overall
Team	W	L	T	W		L		T
Army		–		8	–	2	–	0
No. 5 Notre Dame		–		8	–	2	–	0
Syracuse		–		8	–	2	–	0
No. 10 Penn State		–		8	–	2	–	1
New Mexico State		–		7	–	2	–	1
UTEP		–		7	–	2	–	1
Utah State		–		7	–	2	–	1
Florida State		–		7	–	2	–	2
West Texas State		–		8	–	3	–	0
Houston		–		7	–	3	–	0
Virginia Tech		–		7	–	3	–	0
Memphis State		–		6	–	3	–	0
Southern Miss		–		6	–	3	–	0
Dayton		–		6	–	3	–	1
Xavier		–		6	–	3	–	1
Miami (FL)		–		7	–	4	–	0
Buffalo		–		6	–	4	–	0
Navy		–		5	–	4	–	1
Holy Cross		–		5	–	5	–	0
Colorado State		–		4	–	5	–	1
Boston College		–		4	–	6	–	0
Georgia Tech		–		4	–	6	–	0
Villanova		–		4	–	6	–	0
Air Force		–		2	–	6	–	2
Tulane		–		3	–	7	–	0
San Jose State		–		2	–	7	–	0
Colgate		–		2	–	8	–	0
Pittsburgh		–		1	–	9	–	0
Rankings from AP Poll

The 1967 Buffalo Bulls football team represented the University at Buffalo as an independent during the 1967 NCAA University Division football season. Led by second-year head coach Doc Urich, the Bulls compiled a record of 6–4. The team's offense scored 241 points while the defense allowed 191 points. Buffalo played home games at Rotary Field in Buffalo, New York.

== Schedule ==
Date	Opponent	Site	Result	Attendance	Source
September 16	Kent State	Rotary Field; Buffalo, NY	W 30–6	11,019	
September 23	at NC State	Carter Stadium; Raleigh, NC	L 6–24	20,200	
September 30	at Virginia	Scott Stadium; Charlottesville, VA	L 12–35	16,000	
October 7	Temple	Rotary Field; Buffalo, NY	W 44–14	9,275	
October 14	Boston University	Rotary Field; Buffalo, NY	W 6–0	8,573	
October 21	at Boston College	Alumni Stadium; Chestnut Hill, MA	W 26–14	15,000	
October 28	at Holy Cross	Fitton Field; Worcester, MA	L 25–38	12,021–12,029	
November 4	at Delaware	Delaware Stadium; Newark, DE	W 38–19	6,200–6,523	
November 11	at Villanova	Villanova Stadium; Villanova, PA	L 23–41	8,352	
November 18	Colgate	Rotary Field; Buffalo, NY	W 31–0	6,646	
