= 1967 Clemson Tigers football team =

American college football season

1967 Clemson Tigers football
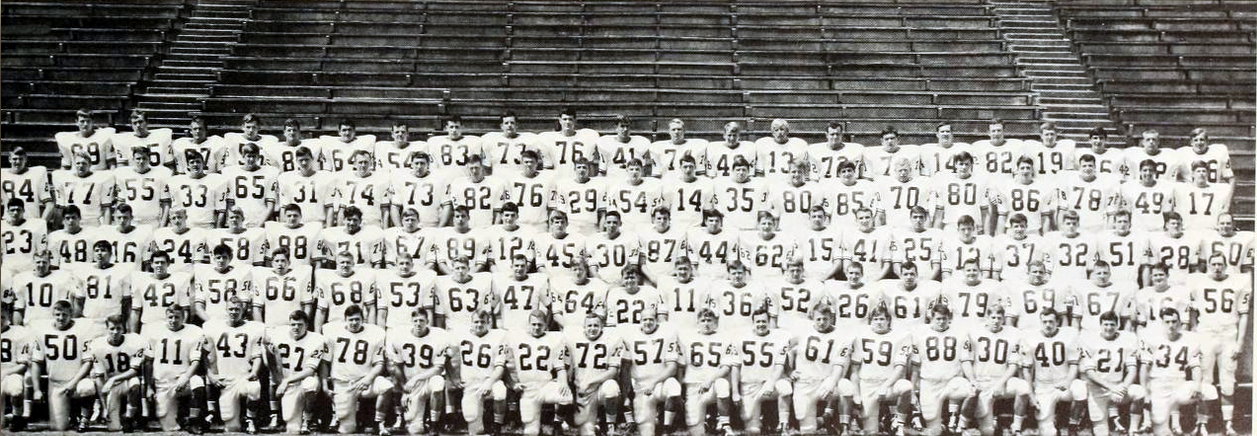

ACC champion
- Conference: Atlantic Coast Conference
- Record: 6–4 (6–0 ACC)
- Head coach: Frank Howard (28th season)
- Captains: Jimmy Addison; Frank Liberatore
- Home stadium: Memorial Stadium

1967 Atlantic Coast Conference football standings
| | Conf. | | | | | Overall |
| Team | W | | L | | T | W | | L | | T |
|---|---|---|---|---|---|---|---|---|---|---|
| Clemson $ | 6 | – | 0 | – | 0 | 6 | – | 4 | – | 0 |
| NC State | 5 | – | 1 | – | 0 | 9 | – | 2 | – | 0 |
| South Carolina | 4 | – | 2 | – | 0 | 5 | – | 5 | – | 0 |
| Virginia | 3 | – | 3 | – | 0 | 5 | – | 5 | – | 0 |
| Wake Forest | 3 | – | 4 | – | 0 | 4 | – | 6 | – | 0 |
| Duke | 2 | – | 4 | – | 0 | 4 | – | 6 | – | 0 |
| North Carolina | 2 | – | 5 | – | 0 | 2 | – | 8 | – | 0 |
| Maryland | 0 | – | 6 | – | 0 | 0 | – | 9 | – | 0 |
$ – Conference champion

The 1967 Clemson Tigers football team was an American football team that represented Clemson University in the Atlantic Coast Conference (ACC) during the 1967 NCAA University Division football season. In its 28th season under head coach Frank Howard, the team compiled a 6–4 record (6–0 against conference opponents), won the ACC championship, and outscored opponents by a total of 166 to 128. The team played its home games at Memorial Stadium in Clemson, South Carolina.

Jimmy Addison and Frank Liberatore were the team captains. The team's statistical leaders included Jimmy Addison with 924 passing yards, Buddy Gore with 1,045 rushing yards and 54 points scored, and Phil Rogers with 429 receiving yards.

Five Clemson players were selected by the Associated Press as first-team players on the 1967 All-Atlantic Coast Conference football team: back Buddy Gore; offensive tackle Wayne Mass; offensive guard Harry Olszewski; defensive end Ronnie Duckworth; linebacker Jimmy Catoe; and defensive back Frank Liberatore.

== Schedule ==
| Date | Time | Opponent | Site | Result | Attendance | Source |
|---|---|---|---|---|---|---|
| September 23 | 2:00 p.m. | Wake Forest | Memorial Stadium; Clemson, SC | W 23–6 | 35,706 | |
| September 30 | 2:00 p.m. | No. 5 Georgia* | Memorial Stadium; Clemson, SC (rivalry) | L 17–24 | 46,362 | |
| October 7 | 2:00 p.m. | at Georgia Tech* | Grant Field; Atlanta, GA (rivalry) | L 0–10 | 59,588 | |
| October 14 | 2:30 p.m. | at Auburn* | Cliff Hare Stadium; Auburn, AL (rivalry) | L 21–43 | 26,051 | |
| October 21 | 2:00 p.m. | at Duke | Wallace Wade Stadium; Durham, NC | W 13–7 | 25,817 | |
| October 28 | 2:00 p.m. | Alabama* | Memorial Stadium; Clemson, SC (rivalry) | L 10–13 | 49,596 | |
| November 4 | 1:30 p.m. | at North Carolina | Kenan Memorial Stadium; Chapel Hill, NC | W 17–0 | 28,549 | |
| November 11 | 2:00 p.m. | Maryland^{†} | Memorial Stadium; Clemson, SC | W 28–7 | 27,537 | |
| November 18 | 2:00 p.m. | No. 10 NC State | Memorial Stadium; Clemson, SC (rivalry) | W 14–6 | 47,074 | |
| November 25 | 2:00 p.m. | at South Carolina | Carolina Stadium; Columbia, SC (rivalry) | W 23–12 | 43,338 | |
*Non-conference game; ^{†}Homecoming; Rankings from AP Poll released prior to the game; All times are in Eastern time
