= 1967 Tulane Green Wave football team =

American college football season

1967 Tulane Green Wave football
- Conference: Independent
- Record: 3–7
- Head coach: Jim Pittman (2nd season)
- Home stadium: Tulane Stadium

1967 NCAA University Division independents football records
	Conf.			Overall
Team	W	L	T	W		L		T
Army		–		8	–	2	–	0
No. 5 Notre Dame		–		8	–	2	–	0
Syracuse		–		8	–	2	–	0
No. 10 Penn State		–		8	–	2	–	1
New Mexico State		–		7	–	2	–	1
UTEP		–		7	–	2	–	1
Utah State		–		7	–	2	–	1
Florida State		–		7	–	2	–	2
West Texas State		–		8	–	3	–	0
Houston		–		7	–	3	–	0
Virginia Tech		–		7	–	3	–	0
Memphis State		–		6	–	3	–	0
Southern Miss		–		6	–	3	–	0
Dayton		–		6	–	3	–	1
Xavier		–		6	–	3	–	1
Miami (FL)		–		7	–	4	–	0
Buffalo		–		6	–	4	–	0
Navy		–		5	–	4	–	1
Holy Cross		–		5	–	5	–	0
Colorado State		–		4	–	5	–	1
Boston College		–		4	–	6	–	0
Georgia Tech		–		4	–	6	–	0
Villanova		–		4	–	6	–	0
Air Force		–		2	–	6	–	2
Tulane		–		3	–	7	–	0
San Jose State		–		2	–	7	–	0
Colgate		–		2	–	8	–	0
Pittsburgh		–		1	–	9	–	0
Rankings from AP Poll

The 1967 Tulane Green Wave football team was an American football team that represented Tulane University as an independent during the 1967 NCAA University Division football season. In its second year under head coach Jim Pittman, the team compiled a 3–7 record and was outscored by a total of 223 to 164.

The team gained an average of 178.8 rushing yards and 93.5 passing yards per game. On defense, it gave up an average of 214.0 rushing yards and 122.6 passing yards per game. Tulane's individual statistical leaders included quarterback Bobby Duhon with 753 passing yards, Warren Bankston with 473 rushing yards, and Nick Pizzolatto with 282 receiving yards.

The team played its home games at Tulane Stadium in New Orleans.

== Schedule ==
Date	Opponent	Site	Result	Attendance	Source
September 23	Miami (OH)	Tulane Stadium; New Orleans, LA	L 3–14	31,250	
September 30	at North Carolina	Kenan Memorial Stadium; Chapel Hill, NC	W 36–11	32,000	
October 6	at Miami (FL)	Miami Orange Bowl; Miami, FL	L 14–34	27,510	
October 14	Florida	Tulane Stadium; New Orleans, LA	L 0–35	24,450–24,500	
October 21	Air Force	Tulane Stadium; New Orleans, LA	L 10–13	20,045–20,245	
October 28	Georgia Tech	Tulane Stadium; New Orleans, LA	W 23–12	29,643	
November 4	Vanderbilt	Tulane Stadium; New Orleans, LA	W 27–14	18,160	
November 11	at No. 2 Tennessee	Neyland Stadium; Knoxville, TN	L 14–35	54,828	
November 18	Virginia	Tulane Stadium; New Orleans, LA	L 10–14	17,712	
November 25	at LSU	Tiger Stadium; Baton Rouge, LA (Battle for the Rag)	L 27–41	66,000	
Rankings from AP Poll released prior to the game
