= 1967 Memphis State Tigers football team =

American college football season

1967 Memphis State Tigers football
- Conference: Independent
- Record: 6–3
- Head coach: Billy J. Murphy (10th season)
- Captains: Tom Wallace; Bubba Winkler
- Home stadium: Memphis Memorial Stadium

1967 NCAA University Division independents football records
	Conf.			Overall
Team	W	L	T	W		L		T
Army		–		8	–	2	–	0
No. 5 Notre Dame		–		8	–	2	–	0
Syracuse		–		8	–	2	–	0
No. 10 Penn State		–		8	–	2	–	1
New Mexico State		–		7	–	2	–	1
UTEP		–		7	–	2	–	1
Utah State		–		7	–	2	–	1
Florida State		–		7	–	2	–	2
West Texas State		–		8	–	3	–	0
Houston		–		7	–	3	–	0
Virginia Tech		–		7	–	3	–	0
Memphis State		–		6	–	3	–	0
Southern Miss		–		6	–	3	–	0
Dayton		–		6	–	3	–	1
Xavier		–		6	–	3	–	1
Miami (FL)		–		7	–	4	–	0
Buffalo		–		6	–	4	–	0
Navy		–		5	–	4	–	1
Holy Cross		–		5	–	5	–	0
Colorado State		–		4	–	5	–	1
Boston College		–		4	–	6	–	0
Georgia Tech		–		4	–	6	–	0
Villanova		–		4	–	6	–	0
Air Force		–		2	–	6	–	2
Tulane		–		3	–	7	–	0
San Jose State		–		2	–	7	–	0
Colgate		–		2	–	8	–	0
Pittsburgh		–		1	–	9	–	0
Rankings from AP Poll

The 1967 Memphis State Tigers football team represented Memphis State University (now known as the University of Memphis) as an independent during the 1967 NCAA University Division football season. In its tenth season under head coach Billy J. Murphy, the team compiled a 6–3 record and outscored opponents by a total of 206 to 150. The team played its home games at Memphis Memorial Stadium in Memphis, Tennessee.

The team's statistical leaders included Terry Padgett with 436 passing yards, Rick Thurow with 394 rushing yards, Richard Coady with 260 receiving yards, and Nick Pappas and Russell Denof with 24 points scored each.

== Schedule ==
Date	Opponent	Site	Result	Attendance	Source
September 23	Ole Miss	Memphis Memorial Stadium; Memphis, TN (rivalry)	W 27–17	50,414	
September 30	Cincinnati	Memphis Memorial Stadium; Memphis, TN (rivalry)	W 17–0	20,509	
October 7	vs. Utah State	Ute Stadium; Salt Lake City, UT	L 14–28	10,048	
October 14	Wake Forest	Memphis Memorial Stadium; Memphis, TN	W 42–10	17,030	
October 21	Southwestern Louisiana	Memphis Memorial Stadium; Memphis, TN	W 28–6	16,829	
October 28	vs. Southern Miss	Mississippi Veterans Memorial Stadium; Jackson, MS (rivalry)	W 24–8	16,000	
November 4	Florida State^{†}	Memphis Memorial Stadium; Memphis, TN	L 7–26	30,304	
November 11	at No. 10 Houston	Houston Astrodome; Houston, TX	L 18–35	46,050	
November 25	North Texas State	Memphis Memorial Stadium; Memphis, TN	W 29–20	14,102	
^{†}Homecoming; Rankings from Coaches' Poll released prior to the game
