= 1967 Notre Dame Fighting Irish football team =

American college football season

1967 Notre Dame Fighting Irish football

National champion (Dunkel)
- Conference: Independent

Ranking
- Coaches: No. 4
- AP: No. 5
- Record: 8–2
- Head coach: Ara Parseghian (4th season)
- Captain: Jim Lynch
- Home stadium: Notre Dame Stadium

1967 NCAA University Division independents football records
	Conf.			Overall
Team	W	L	T	W		L		T
Army		–		8	–	2	–	0
No. 5 Notre Dame		–		8	–	2	–	0
Syracuse		–		8	–	2	–	0
No. 10 Penn State		–		8	–	2	–	1
New Mexico State		–		7	–	2	–	1
UTEP		–		7	–	2	–	1
Utah State		–		7	–	2	–	1
Florida State		–		7	–	2	–	2
West Texas State		–		8	–	3	–	0
Houston		–		7	–	3	–	0
Virginia Tech		–		7	–	3	–	0
Memphis State		–		6	–	3	–	0
Southern Miss		–		6	–	3	–	0
Dayton		–		6	–	3	–	1
Xavier		–		6	–	3	–	1
Miami (FL)		–		7	–	4	–	0
Buffalo		–		6	–	4	–	0
Navy		–		5	–	4	–	1
Holy Cross		–		5	–	5	–	0
Colorado State		–		4	–	5	–	1
Boston College		–		4	–	6	–	0
Georgia Tech		–		4	–	6	–	0
Villanova		–		4	–	6	–	0
Air Force		–		2	–	6	–	2
Tulane		–		3	–	7	–	0
San Jose State		–		2	–	7	–	0
Colgate		–		2	–	8	–	0
Pittsburgh		–		1	–	9	–	0
Rankings from AP Poll

The 1967 Notre Dame Fighting Irish football team was an American football team that represented the University of Notre Dame as an independent during the 1967 NCAA University Division football season. In their fourth year under head coach Ara Parseghian, the Irish compiled an 8–2 record, outscored opponents by a total of 337 to 124, and were ranked No. 5 in the final AP poll and No. 4 in the final UPI poll. In two games against ranked opponents, they lost to No. 10 Purdue and No. 1 USC.

Defensive back Tom Schoen was a consensus first-team pick on the 1967 All-America college football team. End Jim Seymour, defensive tackle Kevin Hardy, and linebacker Mike McGill also received first-team All-America honors from multiple selectors. The team's statistical leaders included quarterback Terry Hanratty (1,439 passing yards), Jeff Zimmerman (591 rushing yards, 54 points scored), Seymour (515 receiving yards).

The team played its home games at Notre Dame Stadium in Notre Dame, Indiana.

== Schedule ==
Date	Time	Opponent	Rank	Site	TV	Result	Attendance	Source
September 23	2:30 p.m.	California	No. 1	Notre Dame Stadium; Notre Dame, IN		W 41–8	59,075	
September 30	2:30 p.m.	No. 10 Purdue	No. 1	Ross–Ade Stadium; West Lafayette, IN (rivalry)		L 21–28	62,316	
October 7	2:30 p.m.	Iowa	No. 6	Notre Dame Stadium; Notre Dame, IN		W 56–6	59,075	
October 14	2:30 p.m.	No. 1 USC	No. 5	Notre Dame Stadium; Notre Dame, IN (rivalry)		L 7–24	59,075	
October 21	2:30 p.m.	at Illinois		Memorial Stadium; Champaign, IL		W 47–7	71,227	
October 28	2:30 p.m.	Michigan State		Notre Dame Stadium; Notre Dame, IN (rivalry)	ABC	W 24–12	59,075	
November 4	2:30 p.m.	Navy	No. 10	Notre Dame Stadium; Notre Dame, IN (rivalry)		W 43–14	59,075	
November 11	1:30 p.m.	at Pittsburgh	No. 9	Pitt Stadium; Pittsburgh, PA (rivalry)		W 38–0	54,705	
November 18	2:00 p.m.	at Georgia Tech	No. 9	Grant Field; Atlanta, GA (rivalry)		W 36–3	60,024	
November 24	8:15 p.m.	at Miami	No. 6	Miami Orange Bowl; Miami, FL (rivalry)		W 24–22	77,265	
Rankings from AP Poll released prior to the game; All times are in Eastern time

== Game summaries ==
=== California ===
Team	1	2	3	4	Total
Golden Bears	0	0	0	8	8
• No. 1 Fighting Irish	7	17	10	7	41

- Date: September 23
- Location: Notre Dame Stadium, South Bend, IN
- Game start: 1:30 p.m. CDT
- Game attendance: 59,075
- Game weather: cloudy, 67 degrees

Scoring summary
1	ND	Harshman 2-yard run (Azzaro kick)	ND 7-0
2	ND	Azzaro 23-yard field goal	ND 10-0
2	ND	Bleier 14-yard pass from Hanratty (Azzaro kick)	ND 17-0
2	ND	Hanratty 12-yard run (Azzaro kick)	ND 24-0
3	ND	Seymour 9-yard pass from Hanratty (Azzaro kick)	ND 31-0
3	ND	Azzaro 22-yard field goal	ND 34-0
4	ND	Gladieux 14-yard pass from O'Brien (Azzaro kick)	ND 41-0
4	Cal	Cox 1-yard run (2-pt. good)	ND 41-8

=== Purdue ===
Team	1	2	3	4	Total
No. 1 Fighting Irish	7	0	7	7	21
• No. 10 Boilermakers	6	0	8	14	28

- Date: September 30
- Location: Ross-Ade Stadium, West Lafayette, IN
- Game start: 1:30 p.m. CDT
- Game weather: sunny, low 60s

Scoring summary
1	PU	Williams 10-yard run (kick failed)	PU 0-7
1	ND	Hanratty 1-yard run (Azzaro kick)	ND 7-6
3	PU	Williams 3-yard run (2-pt. good)	PU 7-14
3	ND	Bleier 1-yard run (Azzaro kick)	Tied 14-14
4	PU	Keyes 11-yard pass from Phipps (Baltzell kick)	PU 14-21
4	ND	Snow 27-yard pass from Hanratty (Azzaro kick)	Tied 21-21
4	PU	Baltzell 21-yard pass from Phipps (Baltzell kick)	PU 21-28

=== Iowa ===
Team	1	2	3	4	Total
Hawkeyes	0	0	6	0	6
• No. 6 Fighting Irish	14	21	7	14	56

- Date: October 7
- Location: Notre Dame Stadium, South Bend, IN
- Game start: 1:30 pm CDT
- Game attendance: 59,075
- Game weather: cloudy, 63 degrees

Scoring summary
1	ND	Hanratty 2-yard run (Azzaro kick)	ND 7-0
1	ND	Zimmerman 2-yard run (Azzaro kick)	ND 14-0
2	ND	Bleier 22-yard pass from Hanratty (Azzaro kick)	ND 21-0
2	ND	Schoen 34-yard interception return (Azzaro kick)	ND 28-0
2	ND	Zimmerman 14-yard run (Azzaro kick)	ND 35-0
3	Iowa	McKinnie 3-yard run (kick failed)	ND 35-6
3	ND	Zimmerman 1-yard run (Azzaro kick)	ND 42-6
4	ND	O'Brien 4-yard run (Azzaro kick)	ND 49-6
4	ND	Landolfi 8-yard run (Heaton kick)	ND 56-6

=== USC ===
USC won at Notre Dame for the first time since 1939, ending a string of 10 consecutive losses at Notre Dame Stadium. Despite entering the game ranked No. 1, the Trojans were a 12-point underdog against the No. 5 Fighting Irish, who committed nine turnovers (including seven intercepted passes).

Team	1	2	3	4	Total
• No. 1 Trojans	0	0	17	7	24
No. 5 Fighting Irish	0	7	0	0	7

- Date: October 14
- Location: Notre Dame Stadium, South Bend, IN
- Game start: 1:30 pm CDT
- Game attendance: 59,075
- Game weather: sunny, 68 degrees

Scoring summary
2	ND	Hanratty 3-yard run (Azzaro kick)	ND 7-0
3	USC	Simpson 1-yard run (Aldridge kick)	Tied 7-7
3	USC	Simpson 35-yard run (Aldridge kick)	USC 7-14
3	USC	Aldridge 22-yard field goal	USC 7-17
4	USC	Simpson 3-yard run (Aldridge kick)	USC 7-24

=== Illinois ===
Team	1	2	3	4	Total
• Fighting Irish	13	20	7	7	47
Fighting Illini	0	0	7	0	7

- Date: October 21
- Location: Memorial Stadium, Champaign, IL
- Game start: 1:30 p.m. CDT
- Game weather: sunny, mid-60s

Scoring summary
1	ND	Azzaro 21-yard field goal	ND 3-0
1	ND	Azzaro 36-yard field goal	ND 6-0
1	ND	Zimmerman 7-yard run (Azzaro kick)	ND 13-0
2	ND	Seymour 18-yard pass from Hanratty (Azzaro kick)	ND 20-0
2	ND	Gladieux 10-yard run (Azzaro kick)	ND 27-0
2	ND	Seymour 48-yard pass from Hanratty (kick failed)	ND 33-0
3	Illinois	Bess 75-yard interception return (McKissic kick)	ND 33-7
3	ND	Gladieux 1-yard run (Azzaro kick)	ND 40-7
4	ND	Quinn 60-yard punt return (Heaton kick)	ND 47-7

=== Michigan State ===
Team	1	2	3	4	Total
Spartans	0	0	0	12	12
• Fighting Irish	7	10	7	0	24

- Date: October 28
- Location: Notre Dame Stadium
- Game start: 1:30 p.m. CDT
- Game attendance: 59,075
- Game weather: cloudy, 40 degrees
- TV announcers (ABC): Chris Schenkel, Bud Wilkinson

Scoring summary
1	ND	Zimmerman 7-yard run (Azzaro kick)	Notre Dame 7–0
2	ND	Azzaro 32-yard field goal	Notre Dame 10–0
2	ND	Zimmerman 30-yard pass from Hanratty (Azzaro kick)	Notre Dame 17–0
3	ND	Zimmerman 47-yard pass from Hanratty (Azzaro kick)	Notre Dame 24–0
4	MSU	Lee 2-yard run (pass failed)	Notre Dame 24–6
4	MSU	Waters 6-yard pass from Feraco (pass failed)	Notre Dame 24–12

=== Navy ===
Team	1	2	3	4	Total
Midshipmen	0	0	8	6	14
• No. 10 Fighting Irish	7	28	0	8	43

- Date: November 4
- Location: Notre Dame Stadium, South Bend, IN
- Game start: 1:30 p.m. CST
- Game attendance: 59,075
- Game weather: Snow, low 30s

Scoring summary
1	ND	Bleier 2-yard run (Azzaro kick)	ND 7-0
2	ND	Seymour 10-yard pass from Hanratty (Azzaro kick)	ND 14-0
2	ND	Hanratty 2-yard run (Azzaro kick)	ND 21-0
2	ND	Bleier 2-yard run (Azzaro kick)	ND 28-0
2	ND	Gladieux 2-yard run (Azzaro kick)	ND 35-0
3	Navy	Cartwright 1-yard run (2-pt. good)	ND 35-8
4	Navy	Cartwright 1-yard run (2-pt. failed)	ND 35-14
4	ND	Dushney 1-yard run (2-pt. good)	ND 43-14

=== Pittsburgh ===
Team	1	2	3	4	Total
• No. 9 Fighting Irish	14	10	6	8	38
Panthers	0	0	0	0	0

- Date: November 11
- Location: Pitt Stadium, Pittsburgh, PA
- Game start: 1:30 pm EST
- Game weather: Low 60s, windy

Scoring summary
1	ND	Zimmerman 4-yard run (Azzaro kick)	ND 7-0
1	ND	Hanratty 2-yard run (Azzaro kick)	ND 14-0
2	ND	Azzaro 34-yard field goal	ND 17-0
2	ND	Schoen 78-yard punt return (Azzaro kick)	ND 24-0
3	ND	Hanratty 16-yard run (2-pt. failed)	ND 30-0
4	ND	Haley 1-yard run (2-pt. good)	ND 38-0

=== Georgia Tech ===
This was Notre Dame's 500th all-time football victory. The attendance of 60,034 was the largest at any football game in Georgia up to that point.

Team	1	2	3	4	Total
• No. 9 Fighting Irish	0	21	6	9	36
Yellow Jackets	3	0	0	0	3

- Date: November 18
- Location: Grant Field, Atlanta, GA
- Game start: 2:00 p.m. EST
- Game weather: 65 degrees

Scoring summary
1	Tech	Carmichael 42-yard field goal	GT 0-3
2	ND	Gladieux 38-yard pass from Hanratty (Azzaro kick)	ND 7-3
2	ND	Bleier 2-yard run (Azzaro kick)	ND 14-3
2	ND	Bleier 4-yard run (Azzaro kick)	ND 21-3
3	ND	Gladieux 3-yard run (kick blocked)	ND 27-3
4	ND	Azzaro 31-yard field goal	ND 30-3
4	ND	Dushney 20-yard run (kick blocked)	ND 36-3

=== Miami (Florida) ===
The crowd of 77,265 was the largest to attend a football game in Florida at the time. This was Notre Dame's third Friday night game in history; the others were in 1951 at Detroit and 1955 at Miami.

Team	1	2	3	4	Total
• No. 6 Fighting Irish	3	7	7	7	24
Hurricanes	0	16	0	6	22

- Date: November 24
- Location: Miami Orange Bowl
- Game start: 8:00 p.m. EST
- Game weather: 75 degrees, 85% humidity

Scoring summary
1	ND	Azzaro 22-yard field goal	ND 3-0
2	Miami	McGee 9-yard pass from Olivo (Harris kick)	Miami 3-7
2	Miami	Olivo 1-yard run (kick failed)	Miami 3-13
2	ND	Ziegler 1-yard run (Azzaro kick)	Miami 10-13
2	Miami	Tracy 37-yard field goal	Miami 10-16
3	ND	Zimmerman 1-yard run (Azzaro kick)	ND 17-16
4	ND	Gladieux 10-yard run (Azzaro kick)	ND 24-16
4	Miami	Mira 1-yard run (2-pt. failed)	ND 24-22

== Roster ==
1967 Notre Dame Fighting Irish football team roster
Players
Coaches
Offense

Pos.	#	Name	Class
RB	28	Rocky Bleier	Sr
RB	20	Bob Gladieux	Jr
QB	5	Terry Hanratty	Jr
G	75	Bob Kuechenberg	Jr

Defense

Pos.	#	Name	Class

Special teams

Pos.	#	Name	Class
P/K	90	Joe Azzaro

Head coach

- Ara Parseghian

Coordinators/assistant coaches

Legend

- (C) Team captain
- (S) Suspended
- (I) Ineligible
- Injured
- Redshirt
