= 1967 Villanova Wildcats football team =

American college football season

1967 Villanova Wildcats football
- Conference: Independent
- Record: 4–6
- Head coach: Jack Gregory (1st season)
- Captains: Fred Levinsky; Brendan Murray
- Home stadium: Villanova Stadium

1967 NCAA University Division independents football records
	Conf.			Overall
Team	W	L	T	W		L		T
Army		–		8	–	2	–	0
No. 5 Notre Dame		–		8	–	2	–	0
Syracuse		–		8	–	2	–	0
No. 10 Penn State		–		8	–	2	–	1
New Mexico State		–		7	–	2	–	1
UTEP		–		7	–	2	–	1
Utah State		–		7	–	2	–	1
Florida State		–		7	–	2	–	2
West Texas State		–		8	–	3	–	0
Houston		–		7	–	3	–	0
Virginia Tech		–		7	–	3	–	0
Memphis State		–		6	–	3	–	0
Southern Miss		–		6	–	3	–	0
Dayton		–		6	–	3	–	1
Xavier		–		6	–	3	–	1
Miami (FL)		–		7	–	4	–	0
Buffalo		–		6	–	4	–	0
Navy		–		5	–	4	–	1
Holy Cross		–		5	–	5	–	0
Colorado State		–		4	–	5	–	1
Boston College		–		4	–	6	–	0
Georgia Tech		–		4	–	6	–	0
Villanova		–		4	–	6	–	0
Air Force		–		2	–	6	–	2
Tulane		–		3	–	7	–	0
San Jose State		–		2	–	7	–	0
Colgate		–		2	–	8	–	0
Pittsburgh		–		1	–	9	–	0
Rankings from AP Poll

The 1967 Villanova Wildcats football team represented the Villanova University during the 1967 NCAA University Division football season. The head coach was Jack Gregory, coaching his first season with the Wildcats. The team played their home games at Villanova Stadium in Villanova, Pennsylvania.

== Schedule ==
Date	Time	Opponent	Site	Result	Attendance	Source
September 9		at West Virginia	Mountaineer Field; Morgantown, WV	L 0–40	27,000	
September 16	1:30 p.m.	at West Chester	Villanova Stadium; Villanova, PA	L 9–14	8,425	
September 23		Boston College	Villanova Stadium; Villanova, PA	L 24–27	12,025	
September 30		at Delaware	Delaware Stadium; Newark, DE (rivalry)	W 21–13	10,425	
October 7		at Virginia Tech	Lane Stadium; Blacksburg, VA	L 0–3	17,000	
October 14		Quantico Marines	Villanova Stadium; Villanova, PA	W 41–16	10,252	
October 28		at Xavier	Corcoran Stadium; Cincinnati, OH	L 6–32	11,281	
November 4		at Holy Cross	Fitton Field; Worcester, MA	W 23–14	15,440	
November 11		Buffalo	Villanova Stadium; Villanova, PA	W 41–23	8,352	
November 23		at Toledo	Glass Bowl; Toledo, OH	L 6–52	14,075	
All times are in Eastern time
