= 1967 West Texas State Buffaloes football team =

American college football season

1967 West Texas State Buffaloes football

Junior Rose Bowl champion

Junior Rose Bowl, W 35–13 vs. Valley State
- Conference: Independent
- Record: 8–3
- Head coach: Joe Kerbel (8th season)
- Home stadium: Buffalo Bowl

1967 NCAA University Division independents football records
	Conf.			Overall
Team	W	L	T	W		L		T
Army		–		8	–	2	–	0
No. 5 Notre Dame		–		8	–	2	–	0
Syracuse		–		8	–	2	–	0
No. 10 Penn State		–		8	–	2	–	1
New Mexico State		–		7	–	2	–	1
UTEP		–		7	–	2	–	1
Utah State		–		7	–	2	–	1
Florida State		–		7	–	2	–	2
West Texas State		–		8	–	3	–	0
Houston		–		7	–	3	–	0
Virginia Tech		–		7	–	3	–	0
Memphis State		–		6	–	3	–	0
Southern Miss		–		6	–	3	–	0
Dayton		–		6	–	3	–	1
Xavier		–		6	–	3	–	1
Miami (FL)		–		7	–	4	–	0
Buffalo		–		6	–	4	–	0
Navy		–		5	–	4	–	1
Holy Cross		–		5	–	5	–	0
Colorado State		–		4	–	5	–	1
Boston College		–		4	–	6	–	0
Georgia Tech		–		4	–	6	–	0
Villanova		–		4	–	6	–	0
Air Force		–		2	–	6	–	2
Tulane		–		3	–	7	–	0
San Jose State		–		2	–	7	–	0
Colgate		–		2	–	8	–	0
Pittsburgh		–		1	–	9	–	0
Rankings from AP Poll

The 1967 West Texas State Buffaloes football team represented West Texas State University (now known as West Texas A&M University) as an independent during the 1967 NCAA University Division football season. In their eighth season under head coach Joe Kerbel, the Buffaloes compiled an 8–3 record and defeated Valley State in the Junior Rose Bowl. West Texas State played home games at the Buffalo Bowl in Canyon, Texas.

== Schedule ==
Date	Opponent	Site	Result	Attendance	Source
September 16	Montana State	Buffalo Bowl; Canyon, TX	W 35–26	15,500	
September 23	Utah State	Buffalo Bowl; Canyon, TX	L 27–44	11,900	
September 30	Pacific (CA)	Buffalo Bowl; Canyon, TX	W 34–6	10,000	
October 7	Colorado State	Buffalo Bowl; Canyon, TX	W 24–14	13,500	
October 14	San Jose State	Buffalo Bowl; Canyon, TX	W 28–14	11,500	
October 21	at New Mexico State	Memorial Stadium; Las Cruces, NM	L 10–31	17,500	
October 28	No. 4 UT Arlington	Buffalo Bowl; Canyon, TX	W 37–27	17,550	
November 4	at Northern Illinois	Huskie Stadium; DeKalb, IL	W 17–10	16,737	
November 11	at East Carolina	Ficklen Memorial Stadium; Greenville, NC	W 37–13	12,553	
November 18	at Wichita State	Veterans Field; Wichita, KS	L 12–22	6,880	
December 2	vs. Valley State	Rose Bowl; Pasadena, CA (Junior Rose Bowl)	W 35–13	23,802	
Rankings from AP Poll released prior to the game
