= 1967 Colorado State Rams football team =

American college football season

1967 Colorado State Rams football
- Conference: Independent
- Record: 4–5–1
- Head coach: Mike Lude (6th season)
- Home stadium: Colorado Field

1967 NCAA University Division independents football records
	Conf.			Overall
Team	W	L	T	W		L		T
Army		–		8	–	2	–	0
No. 5 Notre Dame		–		8	–	2	–	0
Syracuse		–		8	–	2	–	0
No. 10 Penn State		–		8	–	2	–	1
New Mexico State		–		7	–	2	–	1
UTEP		–		7	–	2	–	1
Utah State		–		7	–	2	–	1
Florida State		–		7	–	2	–	2
West Texas State		–		8	–	3	–	0
Houston		–		7	–	3	–	0
Virginia Tech		–		7	–	3	–	0
Memphis State		–		6	–	3	–	0
Southern Miss		–		6	–	3	–	0
Dayton		–		6	–	3	–	1
Xavier		–		6	–	3	–	1
Miami (FL)		–		7	–	4	–	0
Buffalo		–		6	–	4	–	0
Navy		–		5	–	4	–	1
Holy Cross		–		5	–	5	–	0
Colorado State		–		4	–	5	–	1
Boston College		–		4	–	6	–	0
Georgia Tech		–		4	–	6	–	0
Villanova		–		4	–	6	–	0
Air Force		–		2	–	6	–	2
Tulane		–		3	–	7	–	0
San Jose State		–		2	–	7	–	0
Colgate		–		2	–	8	–	0
Pittsburgh		–		1	–	9	–	0
Rankings from AP Poll

The 1967 Colorado State Rams football team represented Colorado State University as an independent during the 1967 NCAA University Division football season. In their sixth season under head coach Mike Lude, the Rams compiled a 4–5–1 record.

== Schedule ==
Date	Opponent	Site	Result	Attendance	Source
September 23	Kansas State	Colorado Field; Fort Collins, CO	L 7–17	14,600	
September 30	at Wyoming	War Memorial Stadium; Laramie, WY (rivalry)	L 10–13	20,063	
October 7	at West Texas State	Buffalo Bowl; Canyon, TX	L 14–24	13,500	
October 14	at North Texas State	Fouts Field; Denton, TX	L 10–21	9,500	
October 21	Utah State^{†}	Colorado Field; Fort Collins, CO	W 17–14	14,178	
October 28	at Air Force	Falcon Stadium; Colorado Springs, CO (rivalry)	T 17–17	27,595	
November 4	at Pacific (CA)	Pacific Memorial Stadium; Stockton, CA	W 24–15	8,000	
November 11	at UTEP	Sun Bowl; El Paso, TX	L 0–17	22,000	
November 18	Emporia State	Colorado Field; Fort Collins, CO	W 77–0	8,235	
November 25	Wichita State	Colorado Field; Fort Collins, CO	W 43–11	6,500	
^{†}Homecoming
