= 1967 Virginia Tech Gobblers football team =

American college football season

1967 Virginia Tech Gobblers football
- Conference: Independent
- Record: 7–3
- Head coach: Jerry Claiborne (7th season)
- Home stadium: Lane Stadium

1967 NCAA University Division independents football records
| | Conf. | | | Overall |
| Team | W | L | T | W | | L | | T |
|---|---|---|---|---|---|---|---|---|
| Army | | – | | 8 | – | 2 | – | 0 |
| No. 5 Notre Dame | | – | | 8 | – | 2 | – | 0 |
| Syracuse | | – | | 8 | – | 2 | – | 0 |
| No. 10 Penn State | | – | | 8 | – | 2 | – | 1 |
| New Mexico State | | – | | 7 | – | 2 | – | 1 |
| UTEP | | – | | 7 | – | 2 | – | 1 |
| Utah State | | – | | 7 | – | 2 | – | 1 |
| Florida State | | – | | 7 | – | 2 | – | 2 |
| West Texas State | | – | | 8 | – | 3 | – | 0 |
| Houston | | – | | 7 | – | 3 | – | 0 |
| Virginia Tech | | – | | 7 | – | 3 | – | 0 |
| Memphis State | | – | | 6 | – | 3 | – | 0 |
| Southern Miss | | – | | 6 | – | 3 | – | 0 |
| Dayton | | – | | 6 | – | 3 | – | 1 |
| Xavier | | – | | 6 | – | 3 | – | 1 |
| Miami (FL) | | – | | 7 | – | 4 | – | 0 |
| Buffalo | | – | | 6 | – | 4 | – | 0 |
| Navy | | – | | 5 | – | 4 | – | 1 |
| Holy Cross | | – | | 5 | – | 5 | – | 0 |
| Colorado State | | – | | 4 | – | 5 | – | 1 |
| Boston College | | – | | 4 | – | 6 | – | 0 |
| Georgia Tech | | – | | 4 | – | 6 | – | 0 |
| Villanova | | – | | 4 | – | 6 | – | 0 |
| Air Force | | – | | 2 | – | 6 | – | 2 |
| Tulane | | – | | 3 | – | 7 | – | 0 |
| San Jose State | | – | | 2 | – | 7 | – | 0 |
| Colgate | | – | | 2 | – | 8 | – | 0 |
| Pittsburgh | | – | | 1 | – | 9 | – | 0 |
Rankings from AP Poll

The 1967 Virginia Tech Gobblers football team represented the Virginia Polytechnic Institute or VPI (now known as Virginia Polytechnic Institute and State University or Virginia Tech) as an independent during the 1967 NCAA University Division football season. Led by seventh-year head coach Jerry Claiborne the Gobblers compiled an overall record of 7–3. VPI played home games at Lane Stadium in Blacksburg, Virginia.

== Schedule ==
| Date | Opponent | Site | Result | Attendance | Source |
|---|---|---|---|---|---|
| September 16 | at Tampa | Phillips Field; Tampa, FL | W 13–3 | 10,000 | |
| September 23 | William & Mary | Lane Stadium; Blacksburg, VA | W 31–7 | 23,500 | |
| September 30 | at Kansas State | Memorial Stadium; Manhattan, KS | W 15–3 | 20,500 | |
| October 7 | Villanova | Lane Stadium; Blacksburg, VA | W 3–0 | 17,000 | |
| October 14 | at Kentucky | McLean Stadium; Lexington, KY | W 24–14 | 23,000 | |
| October 21 | Richmond | Lane Stadium; Blacksburg, VA | W 45–14 | 27,322 | |
| October 28 | at West Virginia | Mountaineer Field; Morgantown, WV (rivalry) | W 20–7 | 31,500 | |
| November 4 | Miami (FL) | Lane Stadium; Blacksburg, VA (rivalry) | L 7–14 | 35,000 | |
| November 11 | at Florida State | Doak Campbell Stadium; Tallahassee, FL | L 15–38 | 29,856 | |
| November 23 | vs. VMI | Victory Stadium; Roanoke, VA (rivalry) | L 10–12 | 20,000 | |

== Roster ==
The following players were members of the 1967 football team according to the roster published in the 1968 edition of The Bugle, the Virginia Tech yearbook.

VPI 1967 roster
| Art Aguilar; Ken Barefoot; Eddie Barker; Frank Beamer; Judson Bigelow; David Binko; Preston Blackburn; Steve Bocko; Jud Brownell; James Edward "Eddie" Carter; Chris Frank Collis; George Constantinides; Larry Creekmore; J. Dee Crigger; Clarence Culpepper; Daniel Cupp; Ron Davidson; Scott Dawson; Peter Francis Dawyot; Damon William Dedo; Charles "Chalkie" Eades | Kenneth Wayne Edwards; Gene Fisher; Chester Arthur Forrester; George Foussekis; Doug Gainous; Jerry Green; Bob Griffith; Waddey Harvey; Jeff Haynes; Bert Henderson; Hank Immel; Al Kincaid; Dickie Longerbeam; Frank Loria; Leonard Angelo Luongo; John Lawrence Maxwell; Littlejohn McSwain; Milton E. Miller; Richard Mollo; Dan Mooney; Frederick Marshall Mooney | Thomas Irwin Parks; James Anthony Pigninelli; Rick Piland; Wayne Rash; Jim Richards; Paul Ripley; J. Roller; Gil Schwabe; Emil J. Sholtis Jr.; Bill Skinner; Bobby Slaughter; Terry Smoot; L. Wayne Stonesifer; Larry Duke Strager; Tom Swords; Don Thacker; John Randolph Treadwell; Joe Tucker; Jonathan Titley Utin; Mike Widger; Pete Wrenn |
