= 1967 Army Cadets football team =

American college football season

1967 Army Cadets football
- Conference: Independent
- Record: 8–2
- Head coach: Tom Cahill (2nd season)
- Defensive coordinator: Richard S. Lyon (1st season)
- Captain: Bohdan Neswiacheny
- Home stadium: Michie Stadium

1967 NCAA University Division independents football records
	Conf.			Overall
Team	W	L	T	W		L		T
Army		–		8	–	2	–	0
No. 5 Notre Dame		–		8	–	2	–	0
Syracuse		–		8	–	2	–	0
No. 10 Penn State		–		8	–	2	–	1
New Mexico State		–		7	–	2	–	1
UTEP		–		7	–	2	–	1
Utah State		–		7	–	2	–	1
Florida State		–		7	–	2	–	2
West Texas State		–		8	–	3	–	0
Houston		–		7	–	3	–	0
Virginia Tech		–		7	–	3	–	0
Memphis State		–		6	–	3	–	0
Southern Miss		–		6	–	3	–	0
Dayton		–		6	–	3	–	1
Xavier		–		6	–	3	–	1
Miami (FL)		–		7	–	4	–	0
Buffalo		–		6	–	4	–	0
Navy		–		5	–	4	–	1
Holy Cross		–		5	–	5	–	0
Colorado State		–		4	–	5	–	1
Boston College		–		4	–	6	–	0
Georgia Tech		–		4	–	6	–	0
Villanova		–		4	–	6	–	0
Air Force		–		2	–	6	–	2
Tulane		–		3	–	7	–	0
San Jose State		–		2	–	7	–	0
Colgate		–		2	–	8	–	0
Pittsburgh		–		1	–	9	–	0
Rankings from AP Poll

The 1967 Army Cadets football team represented the United States Military Academy as an independent during the 1967 NCAA University Division football season. In their second year under head coach Tom Cahill, the Cadets compiled an 8–2 record and outscored their opponents 183 to 94. In the annual Army–Navy Game in December, the Cadets lost 19–14 to the Midshipmen. Army's other loss was to underdog Duke, by three points in early October; the Blue Devils also defeated Navy, by nineteen in November.

After their final home game, a 22–0 shutout of Utah on Veterans Day, the Cadets were 7–1 and prime candidates for the academy's first-ever bowl invitation. In the midst of the Vietnam War, Pentagon officials decided against it, citing the "heavy demands on the players' time" as well as an emphasis on football being "not consistent with the academy's basic mission: to produce career Army officers."

No Army players received first-team honors on the All-America team.

== Schedule ==
Date	Opponent	Site	Result	Attendance	Source
September 23	Virginia	Michie Stadium; West Point, NY	W 26–7	28,500	
September 30	at Boston College	Alumni Stadium; Chestnut Hill, MA	W 21–10	26,000	
October 7	Duke	Michie Stadium; West Point, NY	L 7–10	31,000	
October 13	at SMU	Cotton Bowl; Dallas, TX	W 24–6	26,000–26,500	
October 21	Rutgers	Michie Stadium; West Point, NY	W 14–3	31,000	
October 28	Stanford	Michie Stadium; West Point, NY	W 24–20	31,500	
November 4	at Air Force	Falcon Stadium; Colorado Springs, CO (rivalry)	W 10–7	49,536	
November 11	Utah	Michie Stadium; West Point, NY	W 22–0	31,000–31,500	
November 18	at Pittsburgh	Pitt Stadium; Pittsburgh, PA	W 21–12	22,310	
December 2	vs. Navy	John F. Kennedy Stadium; Philadelphia, PA (Army–Navy Game)	L 14–19	102,000	

== Roster ==
1967 Army Cadets football team roster
Players
Coaches
Offense

Pos.	#	Name	Class
		Van Evans
RB		Charlie Jarvis	Jr
QB		Steve Lindell	Jr

Defense

Pos.	#	Name	Class

Special teams

Pos.	#	Name	Class

Head coach

- Tom Cahill

Coordinators/assistant coaches

Legend

- (C) Team captain
- (S) Suspended
- (I) Ineligible
- Injured
- Redshirt
