= 1967 NCAA University Division football season =

American college football season

- Preseason AP No. 1: Notre Dame
- Regular season: September 15 – December 2, 1967
- Number of bowls: 8
- Bowl games: December 16, 1967 – January 1, 1968
- Champion(s): USC (AP, Coaches, FWAA, NFF)
- Heisman: UCLA quarterback Gary Beban

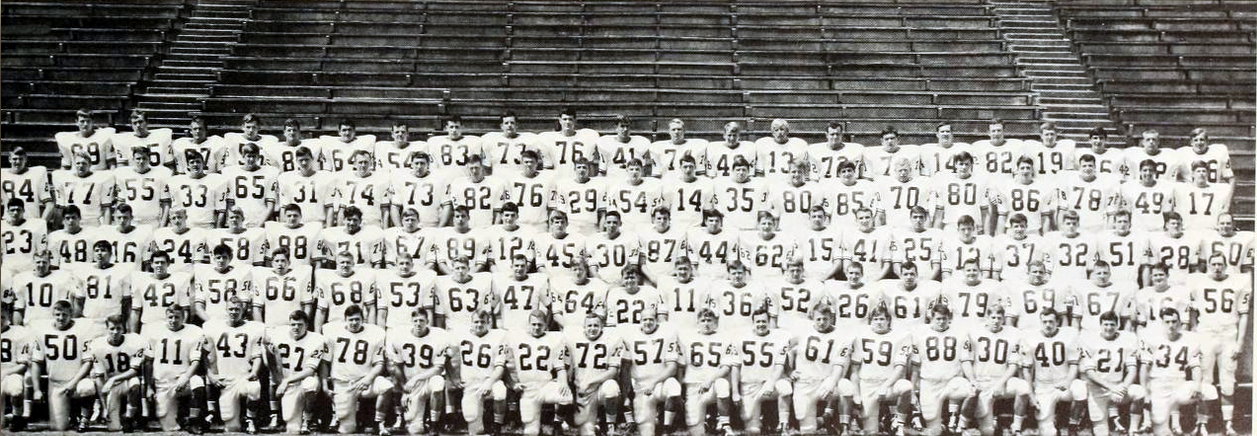

The 1967 NCAA University Division football season was the last one in which college football's champion was crowned before the bowl games. During the 20th century, the NCAA had no playoff for the major college football teams in the University Division, later known as Division I-A and now as the Division I Football Bowl Subdivision (FBS).

The NCAA Football Guide, however, did note an "unofficial national champion" based on the top-ranked teams in the "wire service" (AP and UPI) polls. The "writers' poll" by Associated Press (AP) was the most popular, followed by the "coaches' poll" by United Press International (UPI). In 1967, both AP and UPI issued their final polls at the close of the regular season, but before teams competed in bowl games. The Associated Press presented the "AP Trophy" to the winner.

The AP poll in 1967 consisted of the votes of many sportswriters, though not all of them voted in every poll. Those who cast votes would give their opinion of the ten best teams. Under a point system of 10 points for first place, 9 for second, etc., the "overall" ranking was determined.

== Rule changes ==
- The five interior linemen in punt formation are now required to remain at the line of scrimmage until the ball is kicked, which allowed for more and longer punt returns. However, the rule was extremely unpopular among coaches and was repealed for the 1968 season. This rule was adopted by the National Football League (NFL) in 1974.

== Conference and program changes ==
School	1966 Conference	1967 Conference
George Washington Colonials	SoCon	dropped program

Prior to this season, Idaho and Pacific were demoted to the College Division. After two years, both returned to the University Division in 1969.

== September ==
In the preseason poll released on September 11, first place went to the defending champion Notre Dame Fighting Irish, followed by the No. 2 Alabama Crimson Tide, the No. 3 Michigan State Spartans, No. 4 Texas, and No. 5 Miami. Pacific-8 (still officially called the AAWU until the following season) teams USC and UCLA were seventh and eighth, and Colorado of the Big 8 was tenth. Joining Alabama from the SEC were No. 6 Georgia and No. 9 Tennessee.

September 15–16
The AAWU began its season a week ahead of most other conferences and No. 7 USC beat Washington State 49–0 in a Friday night game at Los Angeles. No. 8 UCLA hosted No. 9 Tennessee and won 20–16. California beat Oregon 21–13 in advance of its game against No. 1 Notre Dame. USC reached the Top Five in the next poll, while Miami dropped to eighth before it had played a game. The poll was No. 1 Notre Dame, No. 2 Alabama, No. 3 Michigan State, No. 4 USC, and No. 5 Texas.

September 23
No. 1 Notre Dame hosted California and won 41–8. At Birmingham, No. 2 Alabama played to a 37–37 tie with Florida State. No. 3 Michigan State lost at home to the Houston Cougars 37–7, and proved the preseason prognosticators wrong on its way to a 3–7 finish. The big matchup was in L.A. between No. 4 USC and No. 5 Texas, and the Trojans won 17–13. No. 6 UCLA beat the Panthers at Pittsburgh 40–8 and No. 7 Georgia won 30–0 at home over Mississippi State. The next poll was No. 1 Notre Dame, No. 2 USC, No. 3 Houston, No. 4 UCLA, and No. 5 Georgia.

Saturday's games also saw a milestone in the integration of college sports in the South, as Kentucky's Nate Northington became the first African-American scholarship athlete to participate in any Southeastern Conference sport when he made his debut at Indiana. His debut was bittersweet, as it came while Greg Page, another African-American player who had arrived at Kentucky at the same time as Northington, was dying from complications of a paralyzing spinal cord injury suffered in an August 22 practice. Page would die on the Friday after Northington's debut.

September 29–30
In a Friday night game, No. 3 Houston rolled over Wake Forest at home, 50–6. On Saturday, No. 1 Notre Dame lost 28–21 at No. 10 Purdue, and No. 2 USC won 21–17 at Michigan State. No. 4 UCLA trampled Washington State in Spokane, 51–23, and No. 5 Georgia won at Clemson, 24–17. Notre Dame fell from the Top 5 in the next poll and USC took the lead, followed by No. 2 Houston, No. 3 UCLA, No. 4 Purdue, and No. 5 Georgia.

In another integration-related milestone, the aforementioned Northington became the first African-American scholarship athlete to play in a matchup between two SEC teams when he took the field against Ole Miss that Saturday, the day after Page's death. Northington would suffer a separated shoulder shortly after entering the game, and never played again for the Wildcats, transferring to Western Kentucky after the season. (Note: The SEC's first African American varsity athlete was Stephen Martin, a baseball walk-on at Tulane, who made his varsity debut in 1966 (1965–66 school year), which was Tulane's last season as an SEC member. Later in the 1967–68 school year, Perry Wallace, who enrolled at Vanderbilt on a basketball scholarship at the same time as Northington and Page arrived at Kentucky, would become the first African American to play basketball in the SEC.)

== October ==
October 7
Top-ranked USC beat Stanford at home, 30–0. The No. 2 Houston Cougars, who had come from nowhere to reach a lofty ranking, lost at home to unranked North Carolina State, 16–6. No. 3 UCLA edged Penn State 17–15. In a Big Ten matchup, No. 4 Purdue beat Northwestern 25–16, and No. 5 Georgia shut out South Carolina at home, 21–0. In South Bend, No. 6 Notre Dame crushed Iowa 56–6 to return to the Top Five as it prepared to face USC. The next poll was No. 1 USC, No. 2 Purdue, No. 3 Georgia, No. 4 UCLA, and No. 5 Notre Dame.

October 14
The No. 1 USC Trojans visited No. 5 Notre Dame and won 24–7, and No. 2 Purdue won at Ohio State 41–6. No. 3 Georgia lost to Ole Miss at Jackson, 29–20. No. 4 UCLA beat California at home, 37–14. Taking the place of the Irish and Georgia in the Top Five were No. 6 Colorado, which had beaten Missouri 23–9, and No. 9 N.C. State, which won at Maryland 31–9. The poll was No. 1 USC, No. 2 Purdue, No. 3 UCLA, No. 4 Colorado, and No. 5 North Carolina State.

October 21
Top-ranked USC beat Washington in Seattle, 23–6, for its sixth straight win. The Trojans' cross-town rival, No. 3 UCLA, was also 6–0, beating Stanford in Palo Alto, 21–16. No. 2 Purdue lost its first game of the season, falling to visiting Oregon State, 22–14. No. 4 Colorado won at Nebraska 21–16, and No. 5 N.C. State hosted Wake Forest and won 24–7. No. 6 Alabama and No. 7 Tennessee squared off in Birmingham and Tennessee won 24–13, a result that would eventually deliver the SEC championship to the Volunteers. In the next poll, USC was the unanimous choice for No. 1, with all 37 first place votes. The other top teams were No. 2 UCLA, No. 3 Colorado, No. 4 Tennessee, and No. 5 N.C. State.

October 28
USC stayed atop the polls, defeating Oregon 28–6 at home, while No. 2 UCLA was idle. No. 3 Colorado lost to visiting Oklahoma State 10–7. No. 4 Tennessee narrowly beat LSU at home, 17–14, and No. 5 N.C. State beat Duke 28–7. Replacing Colorado in the Top Five was No. 6 Georgia, which won 31–7 at Kentucky. The poll: No. 1 USC, No. 2 UCLA, No. 3 Tennessee, No. 4 N.C. State, and No. 5 Georgia.

== November ==
November 4
Top-ranked USC beat California at Berkeley, 31–12, to extend its record to 8–0, and No. 2 UCLA stayed unbeaten but was tied by visiting Oregon State, 16–16. No. 3 Tennessee visited Tampa and beat the Spartans, 38–0. No. 4 N.C. State won at Virginia 30–8, and the No. 5 Georgia Bulldogs narrowly lost at Houston 15–14. No. 6 Purdue won at Illinois 42–9. The next poll was No. 1 USC, No. 2 Tennessee, No. 3 N.C. State, No. 4 UCLA, and No. 5 Purdue.

November 11
Top-ranked USC finally lost, falling 3–0 in the rain and mud at Corvallis to Oregon State. No. 2 Tennessee beat Tulane 35–14. No. 3 N.C. State lost at Penn State 13–8. No. 4 UCLA shut out visiting Washington, 48–0, and No. 5 Purdue beat Minnesota 41–12. Their Big Ten rival, No. 6 Indiana, won at Michigan State 14–13. UCLA took USC's place at the top, leapfrogging Tennessee, whom the Bruins had beaten earlier in the year. The other top teams were No. 3 Purdue, No. 4 USC, and No. 5 Indiana.

November 18
In Los Angeles, the No. 1 UCLA Bruins and the No. 4 USC Trojans met at the Coliseum for their rivalry game, with a Pac-8 title, a Rose Bowl berth, and possibly the national championship on the line. USC reclaimed its place at the top, edging UCLA 21–20. No. 2 Tennessee faced Mississippi in Memphis and won 20–7. No. 3 Purdue beat Michigan State 21–7, but No. 5 Indiana lost to Minnesota 33–7. No. 7 Oklahoma, which had gone on a winning streak after an early loss to Texas in the Red River Showdown, beat Kansas 14–10 at home to clinch the Big 8 championship and a spot in the Orange Bowl. The next poll was No. 1 USC, No. 2 Tennessee, No. 3 Purdue, No. 4 UCLA, and No. 5 Oklahoma.

November 25
In the final week of games before the final polls, No. 1 USC had already completed its season at 9–1. No. 2 Tennessee won at Kentucky 17–7 to clinch the SEC title; the Vols opted to play Oklahoma in the Orange Bowl rather than heading to the Sugar Bowl. Indiana had fallen out of the Top Ten, but made their way back in when they beat No. 3 Purdue at home in Bloomington, 19–14. There was a three-way tie in Big Ten Conference play. Not only were Indiana, Purdue, and Minnesota each 6–1, but Indiana beat Purdue, Purdue beat Minnesota, and Minnesota beat Indiana. The Hoosiers had the better overall record (9–1 vs. 8–2 and 8–2), and since Purdue and Minnesota had been to the Rose Bowl more recently, Indiana qualified for the Rose Bowl. No. 4 UCLA, without injured Heisman Trophy winner Gary Beban and little motivation after their loss to USC the week before, lost a meaningless game to Syracuse 32–14, and No. 5 Oklahoma beat Nebraska 21–14. No. 6 Notre Dame, which had won a Friday night game at Miami, 24–22, returned to the top five with unranked Indiana. In the final poll, USC was tops in both the AP and UPI polls, and was awarded the AP Trophy.

The final regular season poll featured No. 1 USC, No. 2 Tennessee, No. 3 Oklahoma, No. 4 Indiana, and No. 5 Notre Dame. No. 6 Wyoming was the only major team to go unbeaten (10–0), and the Cowboys prepared to play LSU in the Sugar Bowl. No. 7 Oregon State had played three teams that were ranked 1st or 2nd when they played them (UCLA, USC, and Purdue) and went 2–0–1 in those games, but their 13–6 loss to Washington on October 7 kept the "Giant Killers" out of the Rose Bowl. The poll was rounded out by No. 8 Alabama, No. 9 Purdue, and No. 10 Penn State.

A few more games were played after the final poll, but none of them resulted in losses for ranked teams. On December 2, No. 2 Tennessee defeated Vanderbilt 41−14, while the Vols' Orange Bowl opponent, No. 3 Oklahoma, won 38–14 over Oklahoma State. No. 8 Alabama played Auburn in its annual game at Birmingham, won 7–3, and prepared to face SWC champion Texas A&M in the Cotton Bowl.

== Conference standings ==
1967 Athletic Association of Western Universities football standings
	Conf.					Overall
Team	W		L		T	W		L		T
No. 1 USC $	6	–	1	–	0	10	–	1	–	0
No. 7 Oregon State	4	–	1	–	1	7	–	2	–	1
UCLA	4	–	1	–	1	7	–	2	–	1
Stanford	3	–	4	–	0	5	–	5	–	0
Washington	3	–	4	–	0	5	–	5	–	0
California	2	–	3	–	0	5	–	5	–	0
Oregon	1	–	5	–	0	2	–	8	–	0
Washington State	1	–	5	–	0	2	–	8	–	0
$ – Conference champion; Rankings from AP Poll

1967 Atlantic Coast Conference football standings
	Conf.					Overall
Team	W		L		T	W		L		T
Clemson $	6	–	0	–	0	6	–	4	–	0
NC State	5	–	1	–	0	9	–	2	–	0
South Carolina	4	–	2	–	0	5	–	5	–	0
Virginia	3	–	3	–	0	5	–	5	–	0
Wake Forest	3	–	4	–	0	4	–	6	–	0
Duke	2	–	4	–	0	4	–	6	–	0
North Carolina	2	–	5	–	0	2	–	8	–	0
Maryland	0	–	6	–	0	0	–	9	–	0
$ – Conference champion

1967 Big Eight Conference football standings
	Conf.					Overall
Team	W		L		T	W		L		T
No. 3 Oklahoma $	7	–	0	–	0	10	–	1	–	0
Colorado	5	–	2	–	0	9	–	2	–	0
Kansas	5	–	2	–	0	5	–	5	–	0
Missouri	4	–	3	–	0	7	–	3	–	0
Nebraska	3	–	4	–	0	6	–	4	–	0
Oklahoma State	3	–	4	–	0	4	–	5	–	1
Iowa State	1	–	6	–	0	2	–	8	–	0
Kansas State	0	–	7	–	0	1	–	9	–	0
$ – Conference champion; Rankings from AP Poll

1967 Big Ten Conference football standings
	Conf.					Overall
Team	W		L		T	W		L		T
No. 4 Indiana +	6	–	1	–	0	9	–	2	–	0
Minnesota +	6	–	1	–	0	8	–	2	–	0
No. 9 Purdue +	6	–	1	–	0	8	–	2	–	0
Ohio State	5	–	2	–	0	6	–	3	–	0
Illinois	3	–	4	–	0	4	–	6	–	0
Michigan	3	–	4	–	0	4	–	6	–	0
Michigan State	3	–	4	–	0	3	–	7	–	0
Northwestern	2	–	5	–	0	3	–	7	–	0
Iowa	0	–	6	–	1	1	–	8	–	1
Wisconsin	0	–	6	–	1	0	–	9	–	1
+ – Conference co-champions; Rankings from AP Poll

1967 Ivy League football standings
	Conf.					Overall
Team	W		L		T	W		L		T
Yale $	7	–	0	–	0	8	–	1	–	0
Dartmouth	5	–	2	–	0	7	–	2	–	0
Cornell	4	–	2	–	1	6	–	2	–	1
Harvard	4	–	3	–	0	6	–	3	–	0
Princeton	4	–	3	–	0	6	–	3	–	0
Penn	2	–	5	–	0	3	–	6	–	0
Brown	1	–	5	–	1	2	–	6	–	1
Columbia	0	–	7	–	0	2	–	7	–	0
$ – Conference champion

1967 Mid-American Conference football standings
	Conf.					Overall
Team	W		L		T	W		L		T
Toledo +	5	–	1	–	0	9	–	1	–	0
Ohio +	5	–	1	–	0	6	–	4	–	0
Miami (OH)	4	–	2	–	0	6	–	4	–	0
Western Michigan	4	–	2	–	0	5	–	4	–	0
Bowling Green	2	–	4	–	0	6	–	4	–	0
Kent State	1	–	5	–	0	4	–	6	–	0
Marshall	0	–	6	–	0	0	–	10	–	0
+ – Conference co-champions; Kent State forfeited a conference win over Ohio.

1967 Middle Three Conference football standings
	Conf.					Overall
Team	W		L		T	W		L		T
Rutgers $	2	–	0	–	0	4	–	5	–	0
Lafayette	1	–	1	–	0	4	–	5	–	0
Lehigh	0	–	2	–	0	1	–	8	–	0
$ – Conference champion

1967 Missouri Valley Conference football standings
	Conf.					Overall
Team	W		L		T	W		L		T
North Texas State $	4	–	0	–	0	7	–	1	–	1
Tulsa	3	–	1	–	0	7	–	3	–	0
Cincinnati	2	–	2	–	0	3	–	6	–	0
Louisville	1	–	3	–	0	5	–	5	–	0
Wichita State	0	–	4	–	0	2	–	7	–	0
$ – Conference champion

1967 Southeastern Conference football standings
	Conf.					Overall
Team	W		L		T	W		L		T
No. 2 Tennessee $	6	–	0	–	0	9	–	2	–	0
No. 8 Alabama	5	–	1	–	0	8	–	2	–	1
Georgia	4	–	2	–	0	7	–	4	–	0
Florida	4	–	2	–	0	6	–	4	–	0
Ole Miss	4	–	2	–	1	6	–	4	–	1
LSU	3	–	2	–	1	7	–	3	–	1
Auburn	3	–	3	–	0	6	–	4	–	0
Kentucky	1	–	6	–	0	2	–	8	–	0
Vanderbilt	0	–	6	–	0	2	–	7	–	1
Mississippi State	0	–	6	–	0	1	–	9	–	0
$ – Conference champion; Georgia's game against Clemson and Vanderbilt's game against Tulane counted in the conference standings.; Rankings from AP Poll

1967 Southern Conference football standings
	Conf.					Overall
Team	W		L		T	W		L		T
West Virginia $	4	–	0	–	1	5	–	4	–	1
East Carolina	4	–	1	–	0	8	–	2	–	0
Richmond	5	–	2	–	0	5	–	5	–	0
William & Mary	2	–	2	–	1	5	–	4	–	0
VMI	2	–	3	–	0	6	–	4	–	0
Furman	2	–	3	–	0	5	–	5	–	0
The Citadel	2	–	4	–	0	5	–	5	–	0
Davidson	1	–	5	–	0	4	–	5	–	0
$ – Conference champion; West Virginia's game against Villanova and Furman's game against Lehigh counted in the conference standings.

1967 Southwest Conference football standings
	Conf.					Overall
Team	W		L		T	W		L		T
Texas A&M $	6	–	1	–	0	7	–	4	–	0
Texas Tech	5	–	2	–	0	6	–	4	–	0
Texas	4	–	3	–	0	6	–	4	–	0
TCU	4	–	3	–	0	4	–	6	–	0
Arkansas	3	–	3	–	1	4	–	5	–	1
SMU	3	–	4	–	0	3	–	7	–	0
Rice	2	–	5	–	0	4	–	6	–	0
Baylor	0	–	6	–	1	1	–	8	–	1
$ – Conference champion

1967 Western Athletic Conference football standings
	Conf.					Overall
Team	W		L		T	W		L		T
No. 6 Wyoming $	5	–	0	–	0	10	–	1	–	0
Arizona State	4	–	1	–	0	8	–	2	–	0
BYU	3	–	2	–	0	6	–	4	–	0
Utah	2	–	3	–	0	4	–	7	–	0
Arizona	1	–	4	–	0	3	–	6	–	1
New Mexico	0	–	5	–	0	1	–	9	–	0
$ – Conference champion; Rankings from AP Poll

1967 NCAA University Division independents football records
	Conf.			Overall
Team	W	L	T	W		L		T
Army		–		8	–	2	–	0
No. 5 Notre Dame		–		8	–	2	–	0
Syracuse		–		8	–	2	–	0
No. 10 Penn State		–		8	–	2	–	1
New Mexico State		–		7	–	2	–	1
UTEP		–		7	–	2	–	1
Utah State		–		7	–	2	–	1
Florida State		–		7	–	2	–	2
West Texas State		–		8	–	3	–	0
Houston		–		7	–	3	–	0
Virginia Tech		–		7	–	3	–	0
Memphis State		–		6	–	3	–	0
Southern Miss		–		6	–	3	–	0
Dayton		–		6	–	3	–	1
Xavier		–		6	–	3	–	1
Miami (FL)		–		7	–	4	–	0
Buffalo		–		6	–	4	–	0
Navy		–		5	–	4	–	1
Holy Cross		–		5	–	5	–	0
Colorado State		–		4	–	5	–	1
Boston College		–		4	–	6	–	0
Georgia Tech		–		4	–	6	–	0
Villanova		–		4	–	6	–	0
Air Force		–		2	–	6	–	2
Tulane		–		3	–	7	–	0
San Jose State		–		2	–	7	–	0
Colgate		–		2	–	8	–	0
Pittsburgh		–		1	–	9	–	0
Rankings from AP Poll

== Bowl games ==
=== Major bowls ===
Monday, January 1, 1968

BOWL				
COTTON	Texas A&M Aggies	20	No. 8 Alabama Crimson Tide	16
SUGAR	LSU Tigers	20	No. 6 Wyoming Cowboys	13
ROSE	No. 1 USC Trojans	14	No. 4 Indiana Hoosiers	3
ORANGE	No. 3 Oklahoma Sooners	26	No. 2 Tennessee Volunteers	24

In the final AP poll, 9–1 USC had been the top choice of the writers for the AP Trophy, with 36 of the 49 first place votes, and Tennessee followed with 11. Though there was no No. 1 vs. No. 2 matchup, the Rose and Orange bowls featured the four top-ranked teams, with No. 1 USC meeting No. 4 Indiana at Pasadena, and No. 2 Tennessee facing No. 3 Oklahoma at Miami. The Sugar Bowl, at that time, did not automatically get the SEC champion. Ultimately, the New Orleans game featured the Wyoming Cowboys (10–0) of the Western Athletic Conference, against the LSU Tigers. LSU had finished sixth in the ten-team SEC, behind Tennessee, Alabama, Florida, Mississippi, and Georgia. But LSU justified their selection by knocking off Wyoming, 20–13. In the Cotton Bowl, unranked Texas A&M upset No. 8 Alabama 20–16. USC then went out and claimed the national title with a 14–3 over Indiana in the Rose Bowl. Effectively eliminated from finishing No. 1 after USC's win, No. 2 Tennessee went out and lost in the Orange Bowl to No. 3 Oklahoma, 26–24.

=== Other bowls ===
BOWL	Location	Date	Winner	Score	Runner-up
SUN	El Paso, Texas	December 30	Texas El Paso	14–7	Mississippi
GATOR	Jacksonville, Florida	December 30	No. 11 Penn State	17–17	No. 15 Florida State
BLUEBONNET	Houston, Texas	December 23	No. 13 Colorado	31–21	No. 16 Miami (FL)
LIBERTY	Memphis, Tennessee	December 16	No. 17 N.C. State	14–7	No. 18 Georgia

- Prior to the 1975 season, the Big Ten and Pac-8 conferences allowed only one postseason participant each, for the Rose Bowl.
- Notre Dame did not play in the postseason for 44 consecutive seasons (1925–1968).

== Awards and honors ==
=== Heisman Trophy voting ===
The Heisman Trophy is given to the year's most outstanding player

Player	School	Position	1st	2nd	3rd	Total
Gary Beban	UCLA	QB	369	332	197	1,968
O. J. Simpson	USC	RB	261	359	221	1,722
Leroy Keyes	Purdue	HB	278	142	248	1,366
Larry Csonka	Syracuse	FB	22	20	30	136
Kim Hammond	Florida State	QB	17	15	9	90
Bob Johnson	Tennessee	C	13	10	17	76
Granville Liggins	Oklahoma	DT	2	11	33	61
Dewey Warren	Tennessee	QB	4	13	18	56
Wayne Meylan	Nebraska	MG	11	5	12	55
Terry Hanratty	Notre Dame	QB	1	12	27	54

=== All-Americans ===
1967 Consensus All-America Team

Offense

Position	Name	Height	Weight (lbs.)	Class	Hometown	Team
QB	Gary Beban	6'0"	191	Sr.	Redwood City, California	UCLA
HB	Leroy Keyes	6'3"	199	Jr.	Newport News, Virginia	Purdue
HB	O. J. Simpson	6'2"	205	Jr.	San Francisco	USC
FB	Larry Csonka	6'2"	230	Sr.	Stow, Ohio	Syracuse
E	Dennis Homan	6'0"	182	Sr.	Muscle Shoals, Alabama	Alabama
T	Ron Yary	6'6"	245	Sr.	Bellflower, California	USC
G	Harry Olszewski	5'11"	237	Sr.	Baltimore	Clemson
C	Bob Johnson	6'4"	232	Sr.	Cleveland, Tennessee	Tennessee
G	Rich Stotter	5'11"	225	Sr.	Shaker Heights, Ohio	Houston
T	Edgar Chandler	6'2"	222	Sr.	Cedartown, Georgia	Georgia
E	Ron Sellers	6'4"	187	Jr.	Jacksonville, Florida	FSU

Defense

Position	Name	Height	Weight (lbs.)	Class	Hometown	Team
DE	Ted Hendricks	6'8"	222	Jr.	Miami Springs, Florida	Miami (FL)
DT	Dennis Byrd	6'4"	250	Sr.	Lincolnton, North Carolina	NC State
MG	Granville Liggins	5'11"	216	Sr.	Tulsa, Oklahoma	Oklahoma
MG	Wayne Meylan	6'0"	231	Sr.	Bay City, Michigan	Nebraska
DE	Tim Rossovich	6'5"	235	Sr.	Mountain View, California	USC
LB	Adrian Young	6'1"	210	Sr.	La Puente, California	USC
LB	Don Manning	6'2"	204	Sr.	Culver City, California	UCLA
DB	Tom Schoen	5'11"	178	Sr.	Euclid, Ohio	Notre Dame
DB	Frank Loria	5'9"	174	Sr.	Clarksburg, West Virginia	VPI
DB	Bobby Johns	6'1"	180	Jr.	Birmingham, Alabama	Alabama
DB	Dick Anderson	6'2"	204	Sr.	Boulder, Colorado	Colorado

=== Statistical leaders ===
Player scoring most points: Leroy Keyes, Purdue, 114.

== See also ==
- 1967 NCAA University Division football rankings
- 1967 College Football All-America Team
- 1967 USC vs. UCLA football game
