= List of UTEP Miners football seasons =

The UTEP Miners football team began playing in 1914.

== Seasons ==
Year	Coach	Overall	Conference	Standing	Bowl/playoffs	Coaches^{#}	AP^{°}
Tommy Dwyer (Independent) (1914–1919)
1914	Dwyer	2–3					
1915	Dwyer	3–2					
1916	Dwyer	2–3					
1917	Dwyer	0–0–1					
1918	No team						
1919	Dwyer	2–4					
Dwyer:		9–12–1 (.432)					
Harry Van Surdam (Independent) (1920)
1920	Van Surdam	2–4					
Van Surdam:		2–4 (.333)					
Thomas C. Holliday (Independent) (1921)
1921	Holliday	1–4					
Holliday:		1–4 (.200)					
Jack C. Vowell (Independent) (1922–1923)
1922	Vowell	5–4					
1923	Vowell	3–4					
Vowell:		8–8 (.500)					
George B. Powell (Independent) (1924–1926)
1924	Powell	3–2–1					
1925	Powell	5–1–1					
1926	Powell	3–4					
Powell:		11–7–2 (.600)					
E. J. Stewart (Independent) (1927–1928)
1927	Stewart	2–2–2					
1928	Stewart	3–4–1					
Stewart:		5–6–3 (.464)					
Mack Saxon (Independent) (1929–1934)
1929	Saxon	6–1–2					
1930	Saxon	7–1–1					
1931	Saxon	7–1					
1932	Saxon	7–3					
1933	Saxon	3–5–1					
1934	Saxon	4–4					
Saxon (Independent):		34–15–3 (.683)					
Mack Saxon (Border Conference) (1935–1941)
1935	Saxon	1–8	0–3	7th			
1936	Saxon	5–3–1	2–1–1	2nd	L Sun		
1937	Saxon	7–1–2	2–1–1	4th			
1938	Saxon	6–3	3–2	4th			
1939	Saxon	5–4	3–2	4th			
1940	Saxon	4–4–1	3–1–1	3rd			
1941	Saxon	5–4–1	3–2–1	5th			
Saxon (Border Conference):		33–27–5 (.546)	16–12–4 (.563)				
Saxon (Combined):		67–42–8 (.607)	16–12–4 (.563)				
Walter Milner (Border Conference) (1942)
1942	Milner	5–4	4–3	5th			
Milner:		5–4 (.556)	4–3 (.571)				
1943	No team						
1944	No team						
1945	No team						
Jack Curtice (Border Conference) (1946–1949)
1946	Curtice	3–6	2–4	6th			
1947	Curtice	5–3–1	3–3–1	5th			
1948	Curtice	8–2–1	4–1–1	2nd	L Sun		
1949	Curtice	8–2–1	4–2	3rd	W Sun		
Curtice:		24–13–3 (.638)	13–10–2 (.560)				
Mike Brumbelow (Border Conference) (1950–1956)
1950	Brumbelow	7–3	4–2	3rd			
1951	Brumbelow	3–7	2–4	5th			
1952	Brumbelow	5–5–1	2–3–1	5th			
1953	Brumbelow	8–2	4–2	3rd	W Sun		
1954	Brumbelow	8–2	4–2	3rd	W Sun		
1955	Brumbelow	6–2–2	3–2–1	4th			
1956	Brumbelow	9–2	5–0	1st	L Sun		
Brumbelow:		46–23–3 (.660)	24–15–2 (.610)				
Ben Collins (Border Conference) (1957–1961)
1957	Collins	6–3	3–2	3rd			
1958	Collins	2–7	1–4	5th			
1959	Collins	3–7	2–3	T-5th			
1960	Collins	5–4–1	2–3	4th			
1961	Collins	3–7	1–3	4th			
Collins:		19–28–1 (.406)	9–15 (.375)				
Bum Phillips (Independent) (1962)
1962	Phillips	5–4					
Phillips:		5–4 (.556)					
Warren Harper (Independent) (1963–1964)
1963	Harper	3–7					
1964	Harper	0–8–2					
Harper:		3–15–2 (.200)					
Bobby Dobbs (Independent) (1965–1967)
1965	Dobbs	8–3			W Sun		
1966	Dobbs	6–4					
1967	Dobbs	7–2–1			W Sun		
Dobbs (Independent):		21–9–1 (.694)					
Western Athletic Conference (1968–2004)
1968	Bobby Dobbs	4–5–1	3–3	4th			
1969	Bobby Dobbs	4–6	2–5	6th			
1970	Bobby Dobbs	6–4	4–3	4th			
1971	Bobby Dobbs	5–6	1–6	8th			
1972	Bobby Dobbs	2–8	1–6	8th			
1972	Bobby Dobbs (1–5), Tommy Hudspeth( 1–3)	2–8	1–6	8th			
1973	Tommy Hudspeth	0–11	0–7	8th			
1974	Gil Bartosh	4–7	3–4	5th			
1975	Gil Bartosh	1–10	0–6	8th			
1976	Gil Bartosh	1–11	0–7	8th			
1977	Bill Michael	1–10	0–7	8th			
1978	Bill Michael	1–11	1–5	7th			
1979	Bill Michael	2–9	0–7	8th			
1980	Bill Michael	1–11	1–6	9th			
1981	Bill Michael	1–10	1–6	8th			
1982	Bill Yung	2–10	1–6	9th			
1983	Bill Yung	2–10	0–8	9th			
1984	Bill Yung	2–9	1–7	9th			
1985	Bill Yung	1–10	1–7	9th			
1986	Bob Stull	4–8	2–6	8th			
1987	Bob Stull	7–4	5–3	4th			
1988	Bob Stull	10–3	6–2	2nd	L Independence		
1989	David Lee	2–10	1–7	8th			
1990	David Lee	3–8	1–7	9th			
1991	David Lee	4–7–1	2–5–1	7th			
1992	David Lee	1–10	1–7	9th			
1993	David Lee (1–6), Charlie Bailey (0–5)	1–11	0–8	10th			
1994	Charlie Bailey	3–7–1	1–6–1	9th			
1995	Charlie Bailey	2–10	1–7	10th			
1996	Charlie Bailey	2–9	0–8	8th			
1997	Charlie Bailey	4–7	3–5	6th			
1998	Charlie Bailey	3–8	3–5	6th			
1999	Charlie Bailey	5–7	3–4	6th			
2000	Gary Nord	8–4	7–1	T-1st	L Humanitarian		
2001	Gary Nord	2–9	1–7	9th			
2002	Gary Nord	2–10	1–7	9th			
2003	Gary Nord	2–11	1–7	9th			
2004	Mike Price	8–4	5–3	2nd	L Houston		
Conference USA (2005–present)
2005	Mike Price	8–4	5–3	2nd	L GMAC		
2006	Mike Price	5–7	3–5	5th			
2007	Mike Price	4–8	2–6	5th			
2008	Mike Price	5–7	4–4	4th			
2009	Mike Price	4–8	3–5	4th			
2010	Mike Price	6–7	3–5	4th	L New Mexico		
2011	Mike Price	5–7	2–6	4th			
2012	Mike Price	3–9	2–6	5th			
2013	Sean Kugler	2–10	1–7	7th			
2014	Sean Kugler	7–6	5–3	3rd	L New Mexico		
2015	Sean Kugler	5–7	3–5	4th			
2016	Sean Kugler	4–8	2–6	6th			
2017	Sean Kugler (0–5), Mike Price (0–7)	0–12	0–8	7th			
2018	Dana Dimel	1–11	1–7	6th			
2019	Dana Dimel	1–11	0–8	7th			
2020	Dana Dimel	3–5	0–4	7th			
2021	Dana Dimel	7–6	4–4	7th	L New Mexico		
2022	Dana Dimel	5–7	3–5	8th			
2023	Dana Dimel	3–9	2–6	6th			
2024	Scotty Walden	3–9	3–6	T-6th			
2025	Scotty Walden	2–10	1–7	T-11th			
Mountain West Conference (2026–present)
2026	Scotty Walden	0-0	0-0				
Total:		411–642–38 (.394)					
National championship Conference title Conference division title or championship game berth
^{†}Indicates Bowl Coalition, Bowl Alliance, BCS, or CFP / New Years' Six bowl.; ^{#}Rankings from final Coaches Poll.
