= Fritz Shurmur =

American football player and coach (1932–1999)

Biographical details
- Born: July 15, 1932; Wyandotte, Michigan, U.S.
- Died: August 30, 1999 (aged 67); Suamico, Wisconsin, U.S.
- Education: Albion College (1954)

Playing career
- 1951–1953: Albion
- Position: Center

Coaching career (HC unless noted)
- 1954–1955: Albion (GA)
- 1956–1961: Albion (DC)
- 1962–1970: Wyoming (assistant)
- 1971–1974: Wyoming
- 1975–1976: Detroit Lions (DL)
- 1977: Detroit Lions (DC/DL)
- 1978–1979: New England Patriots (DL)
- 1980–1981: New England Patriots (DC/DL)
- 1982–1990: Los Angeles Rams (DC)
- 1991–1993: Phoenix Cardinals (DC)
- 1994–1998: Green Bay Packers (DC)

Head coaching record
- Overall: 15–29

Accomplishments and honors

Awards
- All-MIAA (1953); MIAA Most Valuable Player (1953)

Leonard Frank "Fritz" 'Shurmur (July 15, 1932 – August 30, 1999) was an American football coach. He coached at the University of Wyoming from 1962 to 1974, the last four as head coach, compiling a 15–29 record. Shurmur was subsequently an assistant coach in the National Football League (NFL) with the Detroit Lions (1975–1977), New England Patriots (1978–1981), Los Angeles Rams (1982–1990), Phoenix Cardinals (1991–1993), and Green Bay Packers (1994–1998). He was the winning defensive coordinator in Super Bowl XXXI, following the 1996 season, and was the uncle of former New York Giants (2018–2019) head coach Pat Shurmur. Coach Shurmur was also the author of several books about defense, including Coaching Team Defense (1989), Coaching the Defensive Line (1997) and The Eagle Five Linebacker Defense (1993).

== Early life ==
Nicknamed "Fritz" as a baby after his grandfather's Cocker Spaniel, Shurmur grew up in Wyandotte, Michigan, south of Detroit, along with his parents and his brother, Joseph. His nephew Pat Shurmur is the former head coach of the New York Giants; he was the head coach of the Cleveland Browns from 2011 to 2012 and has served in other coaching positions with other NFL teams, including one game as interim head coach of the Philadelphia Eagles.

Shurmur's father was a factory worker for 49 years in the suburbs of Detroit. Shurmur's parents twice refinanced the family home so Fritz and his brother could have opportunities to attend Albion College.

Shurmur started playing football at Theodore Roosevelt High School in Wyandotte. After graduation in 1950, he played college football at Albion College in Albion, one hundred miles (160 km) west of Detroit. Shurmur played center, earned All-Michigan Intercollegiate Athletic Association (MIAA) honors, and was named the conference's most valuable player. As a complement to football, Shurmur also played baseball at Albion, where he earned all-conference honors.

== Coaching career ==
=== College ===
Shurmur became a graduate assistant at age 22 in 1954, under Albion head coach Morley Fraser. After receiving his master's degree in education administration in 1956, he stayed at Albion as a defensive coordinator. In 1962, Shurmur moved to the University of Wyoming as a defensive coach under first-year head coach Lloyd Eaton, who was promoted following the departure of Bob Devaney for Nebraska. The Cowboys won three consecutive WAC titles (1966–1968), which included a Sugar Bowl appearance after the 1967 season. Following a 1–9 season in 1970, Eaton resigned and Shurmur was promoted to head coach; he had a 15–29 (.341) record over four seasons (1971–1974).

=== NFL career ===
From 1975 to 1999, Shurmur was a defensive coach in the National Football League with six teams. He coached for the Detroit Lions, New England Patriots, Los Angeles Rams, Phoenix Cardinals, Green Bay Packers, and Seattle Seahawks. For nineteen of those years he was a defensive coordinator. His time with the Lions came to an end when he was dismissed along with head coach Tommy Hudspeth and the rest of the staff on January 9, 1978.

Throughout his career, Shurmur was widely known as an innovative mind on defense. Shurmur's coaching style was revered by peers in his profession for defensive genius. For example, in 1992 with the Cardinals, Shurmur had to devise a plan when two linebackers were injured. He developed a "Big Nickel" defense, that used five defensive backs close enough to the line of scrimmage to rush the passer or drop back into coverage.

Shurmur became defensive coordinator for Green Bay in 1994 under head coach Mike Holmgren; in his third season with the team in 1996, the Packers won Super Bowl XXXI over the New England Patriots in January 1997. When Holmgren accepted the dual roles of head coach and general manager with Seattle in 1999, Shurmur went with him as defensive coordinator. That May, he was diagnosed with esophageal and liver cancer; he died at his Wisconsin home in late August, before ever coaching a game with the Seahawks.

== Head coaching record ==
Year	Team	Overall	Conference	Standing	Bowl/playoffs
Wyoming Cowboys (Western Athletic Conference) (1971–1974)
1971	Wyoming	5–6	3–4	T–4th	
1972	Wyoming	4–7	3–4	5th	
1973	Wyoming	4–7	3–4	T–4th	
1974	Wyoming	2–9	1–6	8th	
Wyoming:		15–29	10–18		
Total:		15–29			
