= List of UTEP Miners in the NFL draft =

This is a list of University of Texas at El Paso Miners in the NFL Draft.

== Key ==
B	Back	K	Kicker	NT	Nose tackle
C	Center	LB	Linebacker	FB	Fullback
DB	Defensive back	P	Punter	HB	Halfback
DE	Defensive end	QB	Quarterback	WR	Wide receiver
DT	Defensive tackle	RB	Running back	G	Guard
E	End	T	Offensive tackle	TE	Tight end

== Selections ==
Year	Round	Pick	Player	Team	Position
1940	6	45	Ken Heineman	Los Angeles Rams	B
1941	13	113	Russ Cotton	Pittsburgh Steelers	B
1941	16	144	Gordon Wilson	Los Angeles Rams	G
1942	19	178	Owen Price	New York Giants	B
1944	22	222	Vick Clark	Detroit Lions	B
1945	22	224	Ray Evans	Los Angeles Rams	T
1945	27	282	George Hillery	Washington Redskins	E
1946	16	141	Ray Evans	Chicago Cardinals	T
1948	3	19	Oscar Smith	Green Bay Packers	B
1948	26	245	Fred Wendt	Chicago Cardinals	B
1949	14	139	Ernie Kelly	Chicago Bears	G
1949	24	239	Bernie Smith	Chicago Bears	T
1950	4	44	Ernie Kelly	Detroit Lions	G
1950	6	76	Wayne Hansen	Chicago Bears	C
1953	19	226	King DuClos	San Francisco 49ers	T
1954	18	208	Dick Shinaut	Baltimore Colts	B
1956	5	60	Jesse Whittenton	Los Angeles Rams	DB
1957	9	109	Don Maynard	New York Giants	WR
1959	8	95	Bob Laraba	Green Bay Packers	B
1959	14	159	Bob Bobo	Chicago Cardinals	T
1962	3	42	John Furman	Cleveland Browns	QB
1963	18	252	Luis Hernandez	Green Bay Packers	G
1964	6	83	Jim Evans	Dallas Cowboys	E
1965	11	147	Louis James	Philadelphia Eagles	RB
1968	1	5	Fred Carr	Green Bay Packers	LB
1968	1	22	George Daney	Kansas City Chiefs	G
1968	2	33	Charlie West	Minnesota Vikings	DB
1968	2	46	Bob Wallace	Chicago Bears	WR
1968	3	67	Billy Stevens	Green Bay Packers	QB
1968	6	150	Thurman Randle	Philadelphia Eagles	T
1968	14	381	Steve Lewicke	Cincinnati Bengals	WR
1969	2	36	Grady Cavness	Denver Broncos	DB
1969	2	43	Volly Murphy	Minnesota Vikings	WR
1969	2	46	Eugene Epps	Washington Redskins	DB
1969	6	134	Ron Jones	Green Bay Packers	TE
1969	11	272	Leon Harden	Green Bay Packers	DB
1969	12	289	Denver Samples	Atlanta Falcons	DT
1970	7	171	Jim Fabish	San Diego Chargers	DB
1970	7	182	Clyde Glosson	Kansas City Chiefs	WR
1970	9	214	Paul White	St. Louis Cardinals	RB
1970	11	264	Dennis Bramlett	New England Patriots	T
1970	15	379	Eugene Childs	San Diego Chargers	RB
1971	7	180	Gene Mack	Minnesota Vikings	LB
1971	16	408	Dick Gibbs	New York Giants	TE
1972	5	115	Don Croft	Baltimore Colts	DT
1972	8	183	Paul Gibson	Buffalo Bills	WR
1972	10	238	Eric Washington	St. Louis Cardinals	DB
1972	11	282	Fred DeBernardi	Baltimore Colts	DE
1972	12	305	Bernard Chapman	Cleveland Browns	DB
1972	14	342	Jerome Kundich	Denver Broncos	G
1972	17	426	Bob Tackett	San Diego Chargers	T
1973	2	45	Gary Keithley	St. Louis Cardinals	QB
1973	8	201	Dave Atkins	San Francisco 49ers	RB
1973	13	327	Brooks West	Cincinnati Bengals	DT
1974	9	220	Harold Holton	Green Bay Packers	G
1980	6	147	Bubba Garcia	Kansas City Chiefs	WR
1980	11	303	John Singleton	San Diego Chargers	DE
1982	5	130	Del Thompson	Kansas City Chiefs	RB
1982	7	183	Joey Whitley	Green Bay Packers	DB
1983	6	153	Kevin Belcher	New York Giants	G
1983	7	184	Carlos Scott	St. Louis Cardinals	C
1985	4	91	Mike Smith	Miami Dolphins	DB
1985	8	198	Nikita Blair	Minnesota Vikings	LB
1985	9	231	Dave Toub	Philadelphia Eagles	C
1986	8	208	Seth Joyner	Philadelphia Eagles	LB
1986	9	238	Danny Taylor	Cleveland Browns	DB
1986	10	256	Don Sommer	Houston Oilers	G
1987	8	199	Joe MacEsker	San Diego Chargers	T
1987	8	216	Sammy Garza	Seattle Seahawks	QB
1989	4	85	Tony Tolbert	Dallas Cowboys	DE
1989	6	142	Chris Jacke	Green Bay Packers	K
1991	3	58	Reggie Barrett	Detroit Lions	WR
1992	8	224	Darryl Moore	Washington Redskins	G
1993	3	80	Ed Bunn	Washington Redskins	P
1994	6	194	Barron Wortham	Houston Oilers	LB
1998	7	191	David Terrell	Washington Redskins	DB
2000	5	132	Paul Smith	San Francisco 49ers	RB
2000	5	139	Brian Young	St. Louis Rams	DE
2000	6	194	Leif Larsen	Buffalo Bills	DE
2001	6	191	Menson Holloway	San Francisco 49ers	DE
2002	6	202	Lee Mays	Pittsburgh Steelers	WR
2004	4	131	Trey Darilek	Philadelphia Eagles	G
2005	7	219	Adrian Ward	Minnesota Vikings	CB
2006	2	38	Thomas Howard	Oakland Raiders	LB
2007	3	99	Johnnie Lee Higgins	Oakland Raiders	WR
2007	6	205	Jordan Palmer	Washington Redskins	QB
2008	3	99	Oniel Cousins	Baltimore Ravens	T
2008	4	117	Quintin Demps	Philadelphia Eagles	DB
2008	5	166	Marcus Thomas	San Diego Chargers	RB
2017	5	182	Aaron Jones	Green Bay Packers	RB
2018	2	34	Will Hernandez	New York Giants	G
2024	4	118	Tyrice Knight	Seattle Seahawks	LB
2024	6	220	Elijah Klein	Tampa Bay Buccaneers	G

== Notable undrafted players ==
Note: No drafts held before 1920

Debut year	Player	Position	Debut team	Notes
1973	Larry Willis	DB	Washington Redskins	—
1973	Jeff White	K	New England Patriots	—
1986	Larry Linne	WR	New England Patriots	—
1993	Pete Shufelt	LB	New Orleans Saints	—
2024	Gavin Hardison	QB	Miami Dolphins	—
2024	Zuri Henry	OT	New England Patriots	—
2024	Andrew Meyer	C	Miami Dolphins	—
