= 1970 UTEP Miners football team =

American college football season

1970 UTEP Miners football
- Conference: Western Athletic Conference
- Record: 6–4 (4–3 WAC)
- Head coach: Bobby Dobbs (6th season)
- Home stadium: Sun Bowl

1970 Western Athletic Conference football standings
	Conf.					Overall
Team	W		L		T	W		L		T
No. 6 Arizona State $	7	–	0	–	0	11	–	0	–	0
New Mexico	5	–	1	–	0	7	–	3	–	0
Utah	4	–	2	–	0	6	–	4	–	0
UTEP	4	–	3	–	0	6	–	4	–	0
Arizona	2	–	4	–	0	4	–	6	–	0
Colorado State	1	–	3	–	0	4	–	7	–	0
BYU	1	–	6	–	0	3	–	8	–	0
Wyoming	1	–	6	–	0	1	–	9	–	0
$ – Conference champion; Rankings from AP Poll

The 1970 UTEP Miners football team was an American football team that represented the University of Texas at El Paso as a member of the Western Athletic Conference (WAC) during the 1970 NCAA University Division football season. In its sixth season under head coach Bobby Dobbs, the team compiled a 6–4 record (4–3 against WAC opponents), finished fourth in the conference, and outscored opponents by a total of 258 to 236.

== Schedule ==
Date	Opponent	Site	Result	Attendance	Source
September 12	Pacific (CA)*	Sun Bowl; El Paso, TX	L 18–24	23,450	
September 19	at Utah	Ute Stadium; Salt Lake City, UT	L 20–44	24,745	
September 26	at BYU	Cougar Stadium; Provo, UT	W 17–0	27,406	
October 3	New Mexico State*	Sun Bowl; El Paso, TX (rivalry)	W 21–14	15,653	
October 17	at Colorado State	Hughes Stadium; Fort Collins, CO	W 41–37	20,879	
October 24	No. 12 Arizona State	Sun Bowl; El Paso, TX	L 13–42	23,035	
October 31	New Mexico	Sun Bowl; El Paso, TX	L 16–35	13,503	
November 7	Wyoming	Sun Bowl; El Paso, TX	W 42–7	10,053	
November 14	Arizona^{†}	Sun Bowl; El Paso, TX	W 33–17	15,506	
November 19	at Trinity (TX)*	Alamo Stadium; San Antonio, TX	W 37–16	1,500–1,675	
*Non-conference game; ^{†}Homecoming; Rankings from AP Poll released prior to the game

== Roster ==
1970 UTEP Miners football team roster
Players
Coaches
Offense

Pos.	#	Name	Class
FB	39	Dave Atkins	So
WR	16	Gene Gibson	Jr

Defense

Pos.	#	Name	Class
DT	79	Don Croft	Jr
DB	84	Gene Mack	Sr
DB	24	Eric Washington	Jr

Special teams

Pos.	#	Name	Class
K	11	Jeff White	Sr

Head coach

- Bobby Dobbs

Coordinators/assistant coaches

Legend

- (C) Team captain
- (S) Suspended
- (I) Ineligible
- Injured
- Redshirt
