= Jeff White =

Jeff or Jeffrey White may refer to:

- Jeff White (Australian footballer) (born 1977), Australian rules footballer
- Jeff White (American football) (born 1948), American football player
- Jeff White, founder of Operation Rescue (Kansas)
- Jeffrey White (born 1945), District Judge serving on the United States District Court for the Northern District of California
- Jeff White (visual effects), visual effects artist
- Jeff White (musician) (born 1957), bluegrass guitarist/mandolinist, songwriter and record producer

== See also ==
- Geoffrey White (disambiguation)
