= 1970 Arizona State Sun Devils football team =

American college football season

1970 Arizona State Sun Devils football

WAC champion Peach Bowl champion National champion (Poling System)

Peach Bowl, W 48–26 vs. North Carolina
- Conference: Western Athletic Conference

Ranking
- Coaches: No. 8
- AP: No. 6
- Record: 11–0 (7–0 WAC)
- Head coach: Frank Kush (13th season)
- Home stadium: Sun Devil Stadium

1970 Western Athletic Conference football standings
	Conf.					Overall
Team	W		L		T	W		L		T
No. 6 Arizona State $	7	–	0	–	0	11	–	0	–	0
New Mexico	5	–	1	–	0	7	–	3	–	0
Utah	4	–	2	–	0	6	–	4	–	0
UTEP	4	–	3	–	0	6	–	4	–	0
Arizona	2	–	4	–	0	4	–	6	–	0
Colorado State	1	–	3	–	0	4	–	7	–	0
BYU	1	–	6	–	0	3	–	8	–	0
Wyoming	1	–	6	–	0	1	–	9	–	0
$ – Conference champion; Rankings from AP Poll

The 1970 Arizona State Sun Devils football team was an American football team that represented Arizona State University in the Western Athletic Conference (WAC) during the 1970 NCAA University Division football season. In their 13th season under head coach Frank Kush, the Sun Devils compiled an 11–0 record (7–0 against WAC opponents), won the WAC championship, and outscored their opponents by a combined total of 405 to 151. ASU was picked as the overall #1 team for the 1970 College Football season by Poling System. Poling was a mathematic system used to rank college football teams. It was considered a "National Champion Major Selector" by the National Collegiate Athletic Association.

The team's statistical leaders included Joe Spagnola with 1,991 passing yards, Bobby Thomas with 900 rushing yards, and J. D. Hill with 908 receiving yards.

== Schedule ==
Date	Time	Opponent	Rank	Site	Result	Attendance	Source
September 19		Colorado State	No. 20	Sun Devil Stadium; Tempe, AZ	W 38–9	43,504	
September 26		Kansas State*		Sun Devil Stadium; Tempe, AZ	W 35–13	50,255	
October 3		at Wyoming	No. 18	War Memorial Stadium; Laramie, WY	W 52–3	17,170	
October 10		Washington State*	No. 14	Sun Devil Stadium; Tempe, AZ	W 37–30	46,098	
October 17		at BYU	No. 12	Cougar Stadium; Provo, UT	W 27–3	18,288	
October 24		at UTEP	No. 12	Sun Bowl; El Paso, TX	W 42–13	23,035	
November 7	8:00 p.m.	San Jose State*	No. 12	Sun Devil Stadium; Tempe, AZ	W 46–10	40,009	
November 14		Utah	No. 11	Sun Devil Stadium; Tempe, AZ	W 37–14	42,000	
November 21		New Mexico	No. 9	Sun Devil Stadium; Tempe, AZ	W 33–21	51,283	
December 5		at Arizona	No. 9	Arizona Stadium; Tucson, AZ (rivalry)	W 10–6	38,500	
December 20		vs. North Carolina*	No. 8	Grant Field; Atlanta, GA (Peach Bowl)	W 48–26	52,126	
*Non-conference game; Rankings from AP Poll released prior to the game; All times are in Mountain time

== Game summaries ==
=== Arizona ===
Team	1	2	3	4	Total
• Arizona St	0	0	7	3	10
Arizona	0	0	0	6	6

- Date: December 5
- Location: Arizona Stadium, Tucson, Arizona

Scoring summary
Q3	ASU	Hill 7 yard pass from Spagnola (Ekstrand kick)	ASU 7–0
Q4	ARIZ	McKee 20 yard pass from Demery (kick failed)	ASU 7–6
Q4	ASU	Ekstrand 20 yard field goal	ASU 10–6

== Roster ==
1970 Arizona State Sun Devils football team roster
Players
Coaches
Offense

Pos.	#	Name	Class
RB		Dave Buchanan	Sr
G	67	Ken Coyle	Sr
OT	76	Roger Davis	Jr
TE	30	Calvin Demery	Jr
FB	40	Oscar Dragon	Jr
OT	79	Ed Fisher	Jr
WR	20	J. D. Hill	Sr
WR	25	Steve Holden	So
QB	10	Grady Hurst	Jr
C	51	Ron Lou	So
FB	43	Brent McClanahan	So
G	68	Dave Pentz	Sr
TE	88	Joe Petty	So
C		Gary Shaw	So
G	72	Ed Smith	Sr
G		Rich Smith	So
QB	11	Joe Spagnola	Sr
RB	23	Bob Thomas	Sr
OT	63	Mike Tomco	Jr
G	61	Gary Venturo	Sr

Defense

Pos.	#	Name	Class
DE	82	Junior Ah You	Jr
S	34	Mike Artozqui	Sr
DT	78	Dwight Cahill	Sr
S	21	Mike Clupper	Jr
DE	86	Joe Connolly	Sr
DT	53	Bob Davenport	Sr
DE	84	Mike Fanucci	Sr
LB		Nick Ferrara	Sr
DT	71	Rich Gray	Jr
S		Steve Hale	So
DB	31	Windlan Hall	Jr
DT	64	Tim Hoban	Jr
DB		Mike Kwiatowski	Sr
DB	35	Ron Lumpkin	So
S	36	Prentice McCray	So
LB	50	Mike Mess	Sr
DT	62	Ted Olivo	Sr
LB	54	Prentice Williams	Sr

Special teams

Pos.	#	Name	Class
K	13	Don Ekstrand	Sr
P	15	Jim McCann	Sr

Head coach

- Frank Kush

Coordinators/assistant coaches

Legend

- (C) Team captain
- (S) Suspended
- (I) Ineligible
- Injured
- Redshirt

== 1970 team players in the NFL ==
The following players were claimed in the 1971 NFL draft.

Player	Position	Round	Pick	NFL club
J. D. Hill	Wide receiver	1	4	Buffalo Bills
Jim McCann	Kicker	8	205	San Francisco 49ers
Mike Fanucci	Defensive end	9	219	Washington Redskins
Bob Thomas	End	15	379	Cincinnati Bengals
