= 1967 New Mexico Lobos football team =

American college football season

1967 New Mexico Lobos football
- Conference: Western Athletic Conference
- Record: 1–9 (0–5 WAC)
- Head coach: Bill Weeks (8th season)
- Home stadium: University Stadium

1967 Western Athletic Conference football standings
	Conf.					Overall
Team	W		L		T	W		L		T
No. 6 Wyoming $	5	–	0	–	0	10	–	1	–	0
Arizona State	4	–	1	–	0	8	–	2	–	0
BYU	3	–	2	–	0	6	–	4	–	0
Utah	2	–	3	–	0	4	–	7	–	0
Arizona	1	–	4	–	0	3	–	6	–	1
New Mexico	0	–	5	–	0	1	–	9	–	0
$ – Conference champion; Rankings from AP Poll

The 1967 New Mexico Lobos football team was an American football team that represented the University of New Mexico in the Western Athletic Conference (WAC) during the 1967 NCAA University Division football season. In their eighth season under head coach Bill Weeks, the Lobos compiled a 1–9 record (0–5 against WAC opponents) and were outscored, 433 to 152.

Jim Boller and Rex Hennington were the team captains. The team's statistical leaders included Terry Stone with 1,946 passing yards, David Bookert with 671 rushing yards, and Ace Hendricks with 1,094 receiving yards and 36 points scored.

== Schedule ==
Date	Opponent	Site	Result	Attendance	Source
September 16	Idaho State*	University Stadium; Albuquerque, NM	W 24–3	17,042	
September 23	at BYU	Cougar Stadium; Provo, UT	L 14–44	26,558	
September 30	at Iowa State*	Clyde Williams Field; Ames, IA	L 12–17	22,000	
October 7	Utah	University Stadium; Albuquerque, NM	L 27–42	10,328	
October 14	Arizona State^{†}	University Stadium; Albuquerque, NM	L 23–56	19,537	
October 21	at San Jose State*	Spartan Stadium; San Jose, CA	L 14–52	13,700	
October 27	UTEP*	University Stadium; Albuquerque, NM	L 12–75	9,635	
November 4	at Arizona	Arizona Stadium; Tucson, AZ (rivalry)	L 13–48	20,000	
November 11	No. 7 Wyoming	University Stadium; Albuquerque, NM	L 6–42	14,127	
November 18	New Mexico State*	University Stadium; Albuquerque, NM (rivalry)	L 7–54	8,326	
*Non-conference game; ^{†}Homecoming; Rankings from AP Poll released prior to the game
