= 1967 Utah Utes football team =

American college football season

1967 Utah Redskins football
- Conference: Western Athletic Conference
- Record: 4–7 (2–3 WAC)
- Head coach: Mike Giddings (2nd season)
- Home stadium: Ute Stadium

1967 Western Athletic Conference football standings
	Conf.					Overall
Team	W		L		T	W		L		T
No. 6 Wyoming $	5	–	0	–	0	10	–	1	–	0
Arizona State	4	–	1	–	0	8	–	2	–	0
BYU	3	–	2	–	0	6	–	4	–	0
Utah	2	–	3	–	0	4	–	7	–	0
Arizona	1	–	4	–	0	3	–	6	–	1
New Mexico	0	–	5	–	0	1	–	9	–	0
$ – Conference champion; Rankings from AP Poll

The 1967 Utah Utes football team, or also commonly known as the Utah Redskins, was an American football team that represented the University of Utah as a member of the Western Athletic Conference (WAC) during the 1967 NCAA University Division football season. In their second and final season under head coach Mike Giddings, the Utes compiled an overall record of 4–7 with a mark of 2–3 against conference opponents, placing fourth in the WAC. Home games were played on campus at Ute Stadium in Salt Lake City.

== Schedule ==
Date	Opponent	Site	Result	Attendance	Source
September 23	at Minnesota*	Memorial Stadium; Minneapolis, MN	L 12–13	45,963	
September 30	Oregon*	Ute Stadium; Salt Lake City, UT	W 21–0	17,118	
October 7	at New Mexico	University Stadium; Albuquerque, NM	W 42–27	10,328	
October 14	Wyoming	Ute Stadium; Salt Lake City, UT	L 0–28	28,055	
October 21	at Arizona	Arizona Stadium; Tucson, AZ	W 33–29	35,500	
October 28	at BYU	Cougar Stadium; Provo, UT (rivalry)	L 13–17	32,641	
November 4	Arizona State^{†}	Ute Stadium; Salt Lake City, UT	L 32–49	20,260	
November 11	at Army*	Michie Stadium; West Point, NY	L 0–22	31,000–31,500	
November 18	Utah State*	Ute Stadium; Salt Lake City, UT (rivalry)	L 18–19	23,216	
November 25	UTEP*	Ute Stadium; Salt Lake City, UT	L 8–28	15,843	
December 2	at Hawaii*	Honolulu Stadium; Honolulu, HI	W 25–20	18,500–19,500	
*Non-conference game; ^{†}Homecoming

== NFL/AFL draft ==
Four Utah players were selected in the 1968 NFL/AFL draft, all with AFL teams.

Player	Position	Round	Pick	Franchise
Charlie Smith	Running back	4	110	Oakland Raiders
Jerome Lawson	Defensive back	10	251	Buffalo Bills
Jack Gehrke	Wide receiver	10	265	Kansas City Chiefs
Bob Trumpy	Tight end	12	301	Cincinnati Bengals
