= Jerry DePoyster =

American football player (born 1946)

No. 15, 4
- Positions: Placekicker, Punter

Personal information
- Born: July 6, 1946 (age 80); Omaha, Nebraska, U.S.
- Listed height: 6 ft 1 in (1.85 m)
- Listed weight: 200 lb (91 kg)

Career information
- High school: Bellevue (Nebraska)
- College: Wyoming
- NFL draft: 1968: 2nd round, 37th overall pick

Career history
- Detroit Lions (1968); Oakland Raiders (1971–1972)

Awards and highlights
- First-team All-American (1967)

Career NFL statistics
- Field goals: 3/15
- Extra points: 18/20
- Punts: 177
- Punting yards: 6,912
- Stats at Pro Football Reference

Jerry Dean DePoyster (born July 6, 1946) is an American former professional football player who was a placekicker and punter in the National Football League (NFL). He played college football for the Wyoming Cowboys.

== College career ==
DePoyster was an All-American player at the University of Wyoming. He was recruited as a wide receiver and defensive back, but he made his biggest impact as a punter and kicker. In his junior season, 1966, DePoyster set a record which has never been broken though others have equaled it. He became the first kicker in NCAA history to make three field goals of over 50 yards in one game, connecting from 54, 54 and 52 yards in an October 8, 1966, game against Utah. He also still holds several records for most field goals attempted, and was the top-rated kicker in college football in 1966.

He was a member of two Western Athletic Conference championship teams, in 1966 and 1967, both of which finished with 10–1 won-loss records. The 1967 team went undefeated in the regular season and appeared in the Sugar Bowl in New Orleans on New Year's Day. DePoyster was inducted into the University of Wyoming Athletics Hall of Fame on September 15, 2006.

== Professional career ==
DePoyster was a second round selection (37th overall) in the 1968 Common Draft by the Detroit Lions. He played in all fourteen games that season, as both a punter and placekicker, then served in the U.S. Army for two years. During the 1971 season, he was signed as a free agent by the Oakland Raiders after the team cut veteran Mike Eischeid. DePoyster appeared in the last 12 games of the 1971 season as well as the entirety of the 1972 season. He was strictly a punter and kickoff specialist: future Hall of Famer George Blanda handled the field goals and extra points. In 1973, the Raiders drafted another future Hall of Famer, Ray Guy (who was the first pure punter ever taken in the first round of the NFL draft). DePoyster retired from football to raise a family and to work in the homebuilding and oil industries.

DePoyster is often erroneously cited in various internet sources as having kicked the shortest punt in NFL history, supposedly either 10 or 11 yards long. (The shortest punt ever was actually negative-7 yards by Sean Landeta of the New York Giants in the 1985 playoffs (returned five yards for a touchdown), and there have been at least two 1-yard punts.) Although he was a good punter, he became nationally infamous in 1972 for a botched punt against the Chicago Bears which made him the butt of a joke on the Tonight Show with Johnny Carson. DePoyster told a newspaper interviewer in 2008: "We were playing in Oakland and the water was about a foot above my shoes. I punted from my own end zone and the ball went about ten yards and the guy returned it for a touchdown. I think they replayed that about three times on Johnny Carson's show. I didn't think an old Nebraska guy would do that to me."

In his book One Knee Equals Two Feet, former Raiders head coach John Madden contrasted Guy's "great hands" with DePoyster's. "Jerry DePoster drove me crazy," Madden wrote. "He seldom caught the snap cleanly. He would bobble it or it would bounce off his chest. Every punt got to be an adventure."
