= 1970 BYU Cougars football team =

American college football season

1970 BYU Cougars football
- Conference: Western Athletic Conference
- Record: 3–8 (1–6 WAC)
- Head coach: Tommy Hudspeth (7th season)
- Offensive coordinator: Dave Kragthorpe (1st season)
- Offensive scheme: Single-wing
- Base defense: 5–2
- Home stadium: Cougar Stadium

1970 Western Athletic Conference football standings
| | Conf. | | | | | Overall |
| Team | W | | L | | T | W | | L | | T |
|---|---|---|---|---|---|---|---|---|---|---|
| No. 6 Arizona State $ | 7 | – | 0 | – | 0 | 11 | – | 0 | – | 0 |
| New Mexico | 5 | – | 1 | – | 0 | 7 | – | 3 | – | 0 |
| Utah | 4 | – | 2 | – | 0 | 6 | – | 4 | – | 0 |
| UTEP | 4 | – | 3 | – | 0 | 6 | – | 4 | – | 0 |
| Arizona | 2 | – | 4 | – | 0 | 4 | – | 6 | – | 0 |
| Colorado State | 1 | – | 3 | – | 0 | 4 | – | 7 | – | 0 |
| BYU | 1 | – | 6 | – | 0 | 3 | – | 8 | – | 0 |
| Wyoming | 1 | – | 6 | – | 0 | 1 | – | 9 | – | 0 |
$ – Conference champion; Rankings from AP Poll

The 1970 BYU Cougars football team was an American football team that represented Brigham Young University (BYU) as a member of the Western Athletic Conference (WAC) during the 1970 NCAA University Division football season. In their seventh season under head coach Tommy Hudspeth, the Cougars compiled an overall of 3–8 with a mark of 1–6 against conference opponents, finished seventh in the WAC, and were outscored by a total of 255 to 138.

== Schedule ==
| Date | Time | Opponent | Site | Result | Attendance | Source |
|---|---|---|---|---|---|---|
| September 12 | | North Texas State* | Cougar Stadium; Provo, UT | W 10–7 | 23,496 | |
| September 19 | 11:30 a.m. | at Western Michigan* | Waldo Stadium; Kalamazoo, MI | L 17–35 | 16,100 | |
| September 26 | | UTEP | Cougar Stadium; Provo, UT | L 0–17 | 27,406 | |
| October 3 | | at San Diego State* | San Diego Stadium; San Diego, CA | L 11–31 | 36,830 | |
| October 10 | | at Arizona | Arizona Stadium; Tucson, AZ | L 17–24 | 32,500 | |
| October 17 | | No. 12 Arizona State | Cougar Stadium; Provo, UT | L 3–27 | 18,288 | |
| October 24 | | Utah State* | Cougar Stadium; Provo, UT (rivalry) | W 27–20 | 21,562 | |
| October 31 | | Wyoming | Cougar Stadium; Provo, UT | W 23–3 | 22,551 | |
| November 7 | | at Colorado State | Hughes Stadium; Fort Collins, CO | L 9–26 | 20,034 | |
| November 14 | | at New Mexico | University Stadium; Albuquerque, NM | L 8–51 | 17,856 | |
| November 21 | | at Utah | Ute Stadium; Salt Lake City, UT (rivalry) | L 13–14 | 20,105 | |
*Non-conference game; Rankings from AP Poll released prior to the game; All times are in Mountain time

== Roster ==
1970 BYU Cougars football team roster
Players
Coaches
Offense

| Pos. | # | Name | Class |
|---|---|---|---|
| QB | 10 | Rick Jones | Sr |
| QB | 15 | Brian Gunderson | So |
| WR | 22 | Golden Richards | So |
| RB | 28 | Pete Van Valkenburg | So |
| OL | 76 | Gordon Gravelle | Jr |
| OL | 78 | Paul Howard | So |
| WR | 80 | Larry Heaps | Sr |
| TE | 83 | Dennis Poppinga | Jr |

Defense

| Pos. | # | Name | Class |
|---|---|---|---|
| S | 16 | Ron Mendenhall | Sr |
| DB | 19 | Chris Farasopoulos | Sr |
| LB | 32 | Ron Tree | So |
| LB | 37 | Jeff Lyman | Jr |
| LB | 41 | Art Allred | Sr |
| DL | 79 | Mike Jacobsen | Sr |
| LB | 82 | Bill Dvorak | Jr |
| DE | 84 | Joe Liljenquist | Jr |

Special teams

| Pos. | # | Name | Class |

Head coach

- Tommy Hudspeth

Coordinators/assistant coaches

Legend

- (C) Team captain
- (S) Suspended
- (I) Ineligible
- Injured
- Redshirt

Roster
