= 1970 Utah Utes football team =

American college football season

1970 Utah Utes football
- Conference: Western Athletic Conference
- Record: 6–4 (4–2 WAC)
- Head coach: Bill Meek (3rd season)
- Defensive coordinator: Jim LaRue (3rd season)
- Home stadium: Ute Stadium

1970 Western Athletic Conference football standings
	Conf.					Overall
Team	W		L		T	W		L		T
No. 6 Arizona State $	7	–	0	–	0	11	–	0	–	0
New Mexico	5	–	1	–	0	7	–	3	–	0
Utah	4	–	2	–	0	6	–	4	–	0
UTEP	4	–	3	–	0	6	–	4	–	0
Arizona	2	–	4	–	0	4	–	6	–	0
Colorado State	1	–	3	–	0	4	–	7	–	0
BYU	1	–	6	–	0	3	–	8	–	0
Wyoming	1	–	6	–	0	1	–	9	–	0
$ – Conference champion; Rankings from AP Poll

The 1970 Utah Utes football team, or also commonly known as the Utah Redskins, was an American football team that represented the University of Utah as a member of the Western Athletic Conference (WAC) during the 1970 NCAA University Division football season. In their third season under head coach Bill Meek, the Utes compiled an overall record of 6–4 with a mark of 4–2 against conference opponents, placing third in the WAC. Home games were played on campus at Ute Stadium in Salt Lake City.

== Schedule ==
Date	Time	Opponent	Site	Result	Attendance	Source
September 19		UTEP	Ute Stadium; Salt Lake City, UT	W 44–20	24,745	
September 26		New Mexico	Ute Stadium; Salt Lake City, UT	L 28–34	22,582	
October 3	1:30 p.m.	Iowa State*	Ute Stadium; Salt Lake City, UT	L 13–16	19,156–23,771	
October 10		at Oregon State*	Parker Stadium; Corvallis, OR	L 21–31	23,897	
October 17		at Wyoming	War Memorial Stadium; Laramie, WY	W 20–16	5,518	
October 24		Arizona^{†}	Ute Stadium; Salt Lake City, UT	W 24–0	15,046	
October 31		at San Jose State*	Spartan Stadium; San Jose, CA	W 13–9	10,000–10,100	
November 7		at Utah State*	Romney Stadium; Logan, UT (rivalry)	W 17–0	13,865	
November 14		at No. 11 Arizona State	Sun Devil Stadium; Tempe, AZ	L 14–37	42,000	
November 21		BYU	Ute Stadium; Salt Lake City, UT (rivalry)	W 14–13	20,105	
*Non-conference game; ^{†}Homecoming; Rankings from AP Poll released prior to the game; All times are in Mountain time

== Roster ==
1970 Utah Redskins football team roster
Players
Coaches
Offense

Pos.	#	Name	Class
G	73	Gordon Jolley	Sr
QB	11	Don Van Galder	So

Defense

Pos.	#	Name	Class
DB	19	Chad Nelson	So
DB	41	Norm Thompson	Sr

Special teams

Pos.	#	Name	Class
P	81	Marv Bateman	Jr

Head coach

- Bill Meek

Coordinators/assistant coaches

Legend

- (C) Team captain
- (S) Suspended
- (I) Ineligible
- Injured
- Redshirt

== NFL draft ==
Three Utah players were selected in the 1971 NFL draft.

Player	Position	Round	Pick	NFL club
Norm Thompson	Defensive back	1	17	St. Louis Cardinals
Billy Hunter	Defensive back	16	394	Buffalo Bills
Gordon Jolley	Offensive tackle	17	436	Detroit Lions
