= 1967 BYU Cougars football team =

American college football season

1967 BYU Cougars football
- Conference: Western Athletic Conference
- Record: 6–4 (3–2 WAC)
- Head coach: Tommy Hudspeth (4th season)
- Home stadium: Cougar Stadium

1967 Western Athletic Conference football standings
| | Conf. | | | | | Overall |
| Team | W | | L | | T | W | | L | | T |
|---|---|---|---|---|---|---|---|---|---|---|
| No. 6 Wyoming $ | 5 | – | 0 | – | 0 | 10 | – | 1 | – | 0 |
| Arizona State | 4 | – | 1 | – | 0 | 8 | – | 2 | – | 0 |
| BYU | 3 | – | 2 | – | 0 | 6 | – | 4 | – | 0 |
| Utah | 2 | – | 3 | – | 0 | 4 | – | 7 | – | 0 |
| Arizona | 1 | – | 4 | – | 0 | 3 | – | 6 | – | 1 |
| New Mexico | 0 | – | 5 | – | 0 | 1 | – | 9 | – | 0 |
$ – Conference champion; Rankings from AP Poll

The 1967 BYU Cougars football team was an American football team that represented Brigham Young University (BYU) as a member of the Western Athletic Conference (WAC) during the 1967 NCAA University Division football season. In their fourth season under head coach Tommy Hudspeth, the Cougars compiled an overall record of 6–4 with a mark of 3–2 against conference opponents, finished third in the WAC, and outscored opponents by a total of 278 to 215.

== Schedule ==
| Date | Opponent | Site | Result | Attendance | Source |
|---|---|---|---|---|---|
| September 23 | New Mexico | Cougar Stadium; Provo, UT | W 44–14 | 26,558 | |
| September 29 | Western Michigan* | Cougar Stadium; Provo, UT | W 44–19 | 20,672 | |
| October 7 | at Wyoming | War Memorial Stadium; Laramie, WY | L 10–26 | 19,180 | |
| October 14 | at Oregon State* | Parker Stadium; Corvallis, OR | W 31–13 | 22,322 | |
| October 21 | at UTEP* | Sun Bowl; El Paso, TX | L 17–47 | 25,064 | |
| October 28 | Utah | Cougar Stadium; Provo, UT (rivalry) | W 17–13 | 32,641 | |
| November 4 | at Utah State* | Romney Stadium; Logan, UT (rivalry) | L 9–30 | 15,602 | |
| November 11 | Arizona^{†} | Cougar Stadium; Provo, UT | W 17–14 | 24,442 | |
| November 18 | at Arizona State | Sun Devil Stadium; Tempe, AZ | L 22–31 | 38,183 | |
| November 25 | San Jose State* | Cougar Stadium; Provo, UT | W 67–8 | 19,895 | |
*Non-conference game; ^{†}Homecoming
