= 1970 Arizona Wildcats football team =

American college football season

1970 Arizona Wildcats football
- Conference: Western Athletic Conference
- Record: 4–6 (2–4 WAC)
- Head coach: Bob Weber (2nd season)
- Home stadium: Arizona Stadium

1970 Western Athletic Conference football standings
	Conf.					Overall
Team	W		L		T	W		L		T
No. 6 Arizona State $	7	–	0	–	0	11	–	0	–	0
New Mexico	5	–	1	–	0	7	–	3	–	0
Utah	4	–	2	–	0	6	–	4	–	0
UTEP	4	–	3	–	0	6	–	4	–	0
Arizona	2	–	4	–	0	4	–	6	–	0
Colorado State	1	–	3	–	0	4	–	7	–	0
BYU	1	–	6	–	0	3	–	8	–	0
Wyoming	1	–	6	–	0	1	–	9	–	0
$ – Conference champion; Rankings from AP Poll

The 1970 Arizona Wildcats football team represented the University of Arizona in the Western Athletic Conference (WAC) during the 1970 NCAA University Division football season. In their second season under head coach Bob Weber, the Wildcats compiled a 4–6 record (2–4 against WAC opponents), finished in fifth place in the WAC, and were outscored by their opponents, 213 to 168. The team played its home games on campus at Arizona Stadium in Tucson, Arizona.

The team's statistical leaders included Brian Linstrom with 884 passing yards, Willie Lewis with 665 rushing yards, and Hal Arnason with 569 receiving yards.

This was the final season in which Arizona played only ten regular season games, as the NCAA added an eleventh game for all teams beginning in 1971.

== Schedule ==
Date	Time	Opponent	Site	Result	Attendance	Source
September 19		at No. 8 Michigan*	Michigan Stadium; Ann Arbor, MI	L 9–20	80,386	
September 2	7:30 p.m.	San Jose State*	Arizona Stadium; Tucson, AZ	W 30–29	38,800	
October 3		Iowa*	Arizona Stadium; Tucson, AZ	W 17–10	37,500	
October 10		BYU	Arizona Stadium; Tucson, AZ	W 24–17	32,500	
October 24		at Utah	Ute Stadium; Salt Lake City, UT	L 0–24	15,046	
October 31	2:30 p.m.	Air Force	Arizona Stadium; Tucson, AZ	L 20–23	36,000	
November 7		at New Mexico	University Stadium; Albuquerque, NM (rivalry)	L 7–35	18,110	
November 14		at UTEP	Sun Bowl; El Paso, TX	L 17–33	15,506	
November 21		Wyoming	Arizona Stadium; Tucson, AZ	W 38–12	31,882	
December 5		No. 9 Arizona State	Arizona Stadium; Tucson, AZ (rivalry)	L 6–10	38,500	
*Non-conference game; Rankings from AP Poll released prior to the game; All times are in Mountain time

== Game summaries ==
=== UTEP ===
Arizona went to El Paso and fell behind early and did not recover as UTEP went on to win. To date, this remains the last time that the Wildcats lost to the Miners. Also, the loss led to Arizona failing to win a road game for the second season in a row.

=== Arizona State ===
In a low-scoring affair, the Wildcats held ninth-ranked Arizona State in check, but ultimately fell short to end the season. ASU would go on to finish with a perfect record.

== Roster ==
1970 Arizona Wildcats football team roster
Players
Coaches
Offense

Pos.	#	Name	Class
C	52	Jim Arneson	So
QB	10	Brian Linstrom	Sr
QB	14	Bill Demory	So
WR	32	Charles McKee	Jr

Defense

Pos.	#	Name	Class
LB	31	Mark Arneson	Jr
DE	66	Tim Gaffney	Jr
S	25	Jackie Wallace	So

Special teams

Pos.	#	Name	Class

Head coach

- Bob Weber

Coordinators/assistant coaches

Legend

- (C) Team captain
- (S) Suspended
- (I) Ineligible
- Injured
- Redshirt
