= 1970 New Mexico Lobos football team =

American college football season

1970 New Mexico Lobos football
- Conference: Western Athletic Conference
- Record: 7–3 (5–1 WAC)
- Head coach: Rudy Feldman (3rd season)
- Home stadium: University Stadium

1970 Western Athletic Conference football standings
	Conf.					Overall
Team	W		L		T	W		L		T
No. 6 Arizona State $	7	–	0	–	0	11	–	0	–	0
New Mexico	5	–	1	–	0	7	–	3	–	0
Utah	4	–	2	–	0	6	–	4	–	0
UTEP	4	–	3	–	0	6	–	4	–	0
Arizona	2	–	4	–	0	4	–	6	–	0
Colorado State	1	–	3	–	0	4	–	7	–	0
BYU	1	–	6	–	0	3	–	8	–	0
Wyoming	1	–	6	–	0	1	–	9	–	0
$ – Conference champion; Rankings from AP Poll

The 1970 New Mexico Lobos football team represented the University of New Mexico in the Western Athletic Conference (WAC) during the 1970 NCAA University Division football season. In their third season under head coach Rudy Feldman, the Lobos compiled a 7–3 record (5–1 against WAC opponents), finished second in the WAC, and outscored opponents, 291 to 222.

The team's statistical leaders included Rocky Long with 649 passing yards, Sam Scarber with 961 rushing yards and 78 points scored, and Tom McBee with 125 receiving yards.

== Schedule ==
Date	Opponent	Site	Result	Attendance	Source
September 19	Iowa State*	University Stadium; Albuquerque, NM	L 3–32	17,459–18,068	
September 26	at Utah	Ute Stadium; Salt Lake City, UT	W 34–28	22,582	
October 3	at Kansas*	Memorial Stadium; Lawrence, KS	L 23–49	39,094–41,000	
October 10	San Jose State*	University Stadium; Albuquerque, NM	W 48–25	15,759	
October 17	New Mexico State*^{†}	University Stadium; Albuquerque, NM (rivalry)	W 24–17	17,942	
October 24	at Wyoming	War Memorial Stadium; Laramie, WY	W 17–7	16,589	
October 31	at UTEP	Sun Bowl; El Paso, TX	W 35–16	13,503	
November 7	Arizona	University Stadium; Albuquerque, NM (rivalry)	W 35–7	18,110	
November 14	BYU	University Stadium; Albuquerque, NM	W 51–8	17,856	
November 21	at No. 9 Arizona State	Sun Devil Stadium; Tempe, AZ	L 21–33	51,283	
*Non-conference game; ^{†}Homecoming; Rankings from AP Poll released prior to the game

== Roster ==
1970 New Mexico Lobos football team roster
Players
Coaches
Offense

Pos.	#	Name	Class
G	56	Bob Hicks	Sr
QB	18	Rocky Long	Jr
FB	23	Sam Scarber	Sr

Defense

Pos.	#	Name	Class
LB	55	Mike Barbere	Jr
DT	77	Mike Baumgarner	Sr
DE	85	Mike Buck	Jr
DT	70	Rodney Wallace	Sr

Special teams

Pos.	#	Name	Class

Head coach

- Rudy Feldman

Coordinators/assistant coaches

Legend

- (C) Team captain
- (S) Suspended
- (I) Ineligible
- Injured
- Redshirt
