= Jerry Wampfler =

American football player and coach (1932–2024)

Biographical details
- Born: August 6, 1932; New Philadelphia, Ohio, U.S.
- Died: January 21, 2024 (aged 91)

Playing career
- 1951–1952: Miami (OH)
- Position: Tackle

Coaching career (HC unless noted)
- 1955: Presbyterian (line)
- 1957–1961: Perry HS (OH)
- 1962: Lancaster HS (OH)
- 1965: Miami (OH) (line)
- 1966–1969: Notre Dame (line)
- 1970–1972: Colorado State
- 1973–1975: Philadelphia Eagles (DL)
- 1976–1977: Buffalo Bills (DL)
- 1978: New York Giants (OL)
- 1979–1983: Philadelphia Eagles (OL)
- 1984–1987: Green Bay Packers (OL)
- 1988: San Diego Chargers (OL)
- 1989–1993: Detroit Lions (OL)

Head coaching record
- Overall: 8–25 (college)

Jerry Wampfler (August 6, 1932 – January 21, 2024) was an American football player and coach. He served as the head football coach at Colorado State University from 1970 to 1972, compiling a record of 8–25. Prior to being hired at Colorado State, Wampfler was an assistant football coach at the University of Notre Dame under Ara Parseghian.

Wampfler was hired in January 1970 by Colorado State on a four-year contract after he turned down a three-year offer. He promised that he could turn the struggling program around in four years, but his teams went 4–7 and 3–8 in the next two seasons, failing to win more than one conference game each time. Following a 1–10 performance in the 1972 season, alumni and students disappointed with the state of the football program called for the firing of either Wampfler or athletic director Perry Moore in December 1972. After these events resulted in the decision to retain both men, Moore challenged Wampfler to commit to remaining with Colorado State or to resign. Wampfler resigned from his position in early February 1973, citing a lack of confidence in the administration's commitment to the football program.

Wampfler died on January 21, 2024, at the age of 91.

== Head coaching record ==
=== College ===
Year	Team	Overall	Conference	Standing
Colorado State Rams (Western Athletic Conference) (1970–1972)
1970	Colorado State	4–7	1–3	5th
1971	Colorado State	3–8	1–4	7th
1972	Colorado State	1–10	1–4	7th
Colorado State:		8–25	3–11	
Total:		8–25		
