= 1967 Arizona State Sun Devils football team =

American college football season

1967 Arizona State Sun Devils football
- Conference: Western Athletic Conference

Ranking
- Coaches: No. 20
- Record: 8–2 (4–1 WAC)
- Head coach: Frank Kush (10th season)
- Home stadium: Sun Devil Stadium

1967 Western Athletic Conference football standings
| | Conf. | | | | | Overall |
| Team | W | | L | | T | W | | L | | T |
|---|---|---|---|---|---|---|---|---|---|---|
| No. 6 Wyoming $ | 5 | – | 0 | – | 0 | 10 | – | 1 | – | 0 |
| Arizona State | 4 | – | 1 | – | 0 | 8 | – | 2 | – | 0 |
| BYU | 3 | – | 2 | – | 0 | 6 | – | 4 | – | 0 |
| Utah | 2 | – | 3 | – | 0 | 4 | – | 7 | – | 0 |
| Arizona | 1 | – | 4 | – | 0 | 3 | – | 6 | – | 1 |
| New Mexico | 0 | – | 5 | – | 0 | 1 | – | 9 | – | 0 |
$ – Conference champion; Rankings from AP Poll

The 1967 Arizona State Sun Devils football team was an American football team that represented Arizona State University in the Western Athletic Conference (WAC) during the 1967 NCAA University Division football season. In their tenth season under head coach Frank Kush, the Sun Devils compiled an 8–2 record (4–1 against WAC opponents), finished in second place in the WAC, and outscored their opponents by a combined total of 350 to 210.

The team's statistical leaders included Ed Roseborough with 1,494 passing yards, Max Anderson with 1,188 rushing yards, and Ken Dyer with 654 receiving yards.

Don Baker, Bill Kajikawa, Larry Kentera, Chuck McBride, Bob Owens, and Jerry Thompson were assistant coaches. Fullback Max Anderson and middle guard Curley Culp were the team captains. The Sun Devils finished 4–2 at home and 4–0 on the road. All home games were played at Sun Devil Stadium in Tempe, Arizona.

== Schedule ==
| Date | Opponent | Site | Result | Attendance | Source |
|---|---|---|---|---|---|
| September 16 | San Jose State* | Sun Devil Stadium; Tempe, AZ | W 27–16 | 36,742 | |
| September 23 | Oregon State* | Sun Devil Stadium; Tempe, AZ | L 21–27 | 37,051 | |
| September 30 | at Wisconsin* | Camp Randall Stadium; Madison, WI | W 42–16 | 49,327 | |
| October 7 | UTEP* | Sun Devil Stadium; Tempe, AZ | W 33–32 | 38,142 | |
| October 14 | at New Mexico | University Stadium; Albuquerque, NM | W 56–23 | 19,537 | |
| October 21 | at Washington State* | Joe Albi Stadium; Spokane, WA | W 31–10 | 16,504 | |
| October 28 | No. 8 Wyoming | Sun Devil Stadium; Tempe, AZ | L 13–15 | 42,344 | |
| November 4 | at Utah | Ute Stadium; Salt Lake City, UT | W 49–32 | 20,260 | |
| November 18 | BYU | Sun Devil Stadium; Tempe, AZ | W 31–22 | 38,183 | |
| November 25 | Arizona | Sun Devil Stadium; Tempe, AZ (rivalry) | W 47–7 | 41,567 | |
*Non-conference game; Rankings from Coaches' Poll released prior to the game

== Game summaries ==
On September 9, in the season opener at Sun Devil Stadium, Arizona State defeated San Jose State, 27–16. The Sun Devils held San Jose State to -22 rushing yards. "2007 Media Guide, p. 205."

On September 23, following a bye week, the Sun Devils suffered a 27–21 home loss to Oregon State.

On September 30, Arizona State recorded a 42-16 road victory against Wisconsin. It marked the first ever meeting between the Arizona State and Wisconsin football teams. Fullback Max Anderson gained 220 rushing yards on 21 carries for Arizona State. "2007 Media Guide, p. 196."

On October 7, the Sun Devils outlasted Texas-El Paso for a 33–32 home win.

On October 14, Arizona State prevailed for a 56-23 road victory over New Mexico.

On October 21, the Sun Devils beat Washington State 31–20 on the road. Arizona State WS Wes Plummer recorded a 93-yard interception returned for a touchdown. "2007 Media Guide, p. 200."

On October 28, Arizona State fell, 15–13, against Wyoming in Tempe. Fullback Max Anderson set a single game school record with his 99-yard touchdown run for the Sun Devils. "2007 Media Guide, p. 202."

On November 4, the Sun Devils bounced back with a 49-32 road win over Utah.

On November 18, following a second bye week, Arizona State defeated BYU, 31–22, at Sun Devil Stadium.

In the annual Arizona–Arizona State football rivalry game, the Sun Devils closed the season with a dominating 47–7 home victory against Arizona. Larry Walton provided a 90-yard punt return touchdown for ASU. "2007 Media Guide, p. 202."

== Roster ==
Arizona State's usual offensive lineup included: (WR Richard Mann, LT Larry Langford, LG Jim Kane, C George Hummer, RG Mike Chowaniec, RT Nello Tomarelli, TE Ken Dyer, QB Ed Roseborough, HB Art Malone, FB Max Anderson, & WB J.D. Hill).

Arizona State's usual defensive lineup included: (LE Richard Griffin, LT Bob Rokita, RT Bobby Johnson, RE Dennis Farrell, MG Curley Culp, LLB Dick Egloff, RLB Ron Pritchard, LC Dickie Brown, RC Rick Shaw, SS Paul Ray Powell, & WS Wes Plummer).

Arizona State's usual specialists included: (K Bob Rokita & P Ed Roseborough).

Larry Walton was also on the roster.

== Individual and team statistics ==
Arizona State's leading rusher was Max Anderson (191 Carries, 1,224 gross yards, 36 yards lost, 1,188 net yards, & 6.2 yard avg). Anderson tied a single season school-record with 5 consecutive 100-yard rushing games.

The Sun Devils' leading passer was Ed Roseborough (95-205, 1,494 yds, 46.3% completion pct., 12 TD, & 18 int).

ASU's leader in scoring was Max Anderson (12 TD & 72 total pts).

The Devils' leading receiver was Ken Dyer (39 receptions, 654 yds, & 4 TD).

Arizona State's leader in interceptions was Wes Plummer (8 int & 161 yds).

The Sun Devils' leader in punting was Ed Roseborough (60 Punts, 2,286 yds, & 38.1 avg)

ASU's leader in kickoff returns was Max Anderson (21 Returns & 372 yds).

The Devils' leader in punt returns was J.D. Hill (22 Returns, 221 yds, & 1 TD).

The Sun Devils set a single season school-record averaging 2.7 interceptions per game.

Arizona State averaged 217.4 rushing yards per game, while allowing 79.8 rushing yards per game.

The Sun Devils averaged 197.4 passing yards per game, while allowing 197.9 passing yards per game.

ASU accumulated 414.8 yards of total offense per game, while allowing 276.8 yards of total offense per game.

The Devils averaged 35.0 points per game, while allowing 21.0 points per game.

Arizona State accumulated 181 first downs offensively, while allowing 141 first downs defensively.

The Sun Devils collected 61 total punts and averaged 37.5 yards, while their opponents recorded 77 total punts and averaged 40.3 yards.

== Awards and honors ==
Middle guard Curley Culp received first-team All-American honors from The Sporting News and Time magazine. Linebacker Ron Pritchard received honorable mention on the Associated Press' 1967 All-America team.

Five Sun Devils received first-team honors on the 1967 All-Western Athletic Conference team: Culp, Pritchard, fullback Max Anderson, center George Hummer, and safety Wes Plummer. Five other received second-team All-WAC honors: guard Mike Chowaniec, tight end Ken Dyer, wingback J.D. Hill, cornerback Rick Shaw, and tackle Nello Tomarelli.

Team awards were presented as follows:

- Max Anderson and Curley Culp won the Sun Angel Award.
- Curley Culp won the Mike Bartholomew Award.
- Cecil Abono won the Cecil Abono Captains Award.
- Larry Langford won the Glen Hawkins Sportsmanship Award.
- Dennis Farrell won the Most Improved Award.

Fullback Max Anderson played in the 1967 North–South Shrine Game, the 1968 Coaches All-America Game, and the 1968 Chicago College All-Star Game. Tight end Ken Dyer also played in the 1968 Coaches All-America Game, and middle guard Curley Culp played in the Chicago College All-Star Game.
