= 1967 Wyoming Cowboys football team =

American college football season

1967 Wyoming Cowboys football

WAC champion

Sugar Bowl, L 13–20 vs LSU
- Conference: Western Athletic Conference

Ranking
- Coaches: No. 5
- AP: No. 6
- Record: 10–1 (5–0 WAC)
- Head coach: Lloyd Eaton (6th season)
- Captains: Mike Dirks; Jim Kiick
- Home stadium: War Memorial Stadium

1967 Western Athletic Conference football standings
	Conf.					Overall
Team	W		L		T	W		L		T
No. 6 Wyoming $	5	–	0	–	0	10	–	1	–	0
Arizona State	4	–	1	–	0	8	–	2	–	0
BYU	3	–	2	–	0	6	–	4	–	0
Utah	2	–	3	–	0	4	–	7	–	0
Arizona	1	–	4	–	0	3	–	6	–	1
New Mexico	0	–	5	–	0	1	–	9	–	0
$ – Conference champion; Rankings from AP Poll

The 1967 Wyoming Cowboys football team represented the University of Wyoming in the 1967 NCAA University Division football season. Led by sixth-year head coach Lloyd Eaton, they were members of the Western Athletic Conference (WAC) and played their home games on campus at War Memorial Stadium in Laramie, Wyoming.

Wyoming won all ten games in the regular season, had the nation's best rushing defense, and was invited to the Sugar Bowl in New Orleans on New Year's Day. On a fourteen-game winning streak, underdog Wyoming led unranked LSU 13–0 at halftime, but were outscored 20–0 in the second half.

The Cowboys outscored their opponents 289 to 119; they were led on offense by quarterback Paul Toscano and running back Jim Kiick.

== Schedule ==
Date	Time	Opponent	Rank	Site	TV	Result	Attendance	Source
September 16		at Arizona		Arizona Stadium; Tucson, AZ		W 36–17	37,500	
September 23		Air Force*		War Memorial Stadium; Laramie, WY		W 37–10	21,623	
September 30		Colorado State*		War Memorial Stadium; Laramie, WY (rivalry)		W 13–10	20,063	
October 7		BYU		War Memorial Stadium; Laramie, WY		W 26–10	19,180	
October 14		at Utah		Ute Stadium; Salt Lake City, UT		W 28–0	28,055	
October 21		Wichita State*^{†}	No. 10	War Memorial Stadium; Laramie, WY		W 30–7	18,141	
October 28		at Arizona State	No. 8	Sun Devil Stadium; Tempe, AZ		W 15–13	42,344	
November 4		at San Jose State*	No. 8	Spartan Stadium; San Jose, CA		W 28–7	17,300	
November 11		at New Mexico	No. 7	University Stadium; Albuquerque, NM	ABC	W 42–6	14,127	
November 18		at UTEP*	No. 6	Sun Bowl; El Paso, TX		W 21–19	35,023	
January 1, 1968	11:45 am	vs. LSU*	No. 6	Tulane Stadium; New Orleans, LA (Sugar Bowl)	NBC	L 13–20	78,963	
*Non-conference game; ^{†}Homecoming; Rankings from AP Poll released prior to the game; All times are in Mountain time

== NFL/AFL draft ==
Five Cowboys were selected in the 1968 NFL/AFL draft, the second common draft, which lasted 17 rounds (462 selections).

Player	Position	Round	Overall	Franchise
Jerry DePoyster	Kicker	2	37	Detroit Lions
Mike LaHood	Guard	2	51	Los Angeles Rams
Jim Kiick	Running back	5	118	Miami Dolphins
Mike Dirks	Tackle	5	122	Philadelphia Eagles
Paul Toscano	Defensive Back ^	7	187	Houston Oilers

^ Toscano was the Wyoming quarterback

== Awards and honors ==
- Mike Dirks, All-American: (Football Writers of America, Look Magazine, Newspaper Enterprise Association)
- Mike Dirks, First Team, All-Western Athletic Conference
