= 1967 Arizona Wildcats football team =

American college football season

1967 Arizona Wildcats football
- Conference: Western Athletic Conference
- Record: 3–6–1 (1–4 WAC)
- Head coach: Darrell Mudra (1st season)
- Home stadium: Arizona Stadium

1967 Western Athletic Conference football standings
| | Conf. | | | | | Overall |
| Team | W | | L | | T | W | | L | | T |
|---|---|---|---|---|---|---|---|---|---|---|
| No. 6 Wyoming $ | 5 | – | 0 | – | 0 | 10 | – | 1 | – | 0 |
| Arizona State | 4 | – | 1 | – | 0 | 8 | – | 2 | – | 0 |
| BYU | 3 | – | 2 | – | 0 | 6 | – | 4 | – | 0 |
| Utah | 2 | – | 3 | – | 0 | 4 | – | 7 | – | 0 |
| Arizona | 1 | – | 4 | – | 0 | 3 | – | 6 | – | 1 |
| New Mexico | 0 | – | 5 | – | 0 | 1 | – | 9 | – | 0 |
$ – Conference champion; Rankings from AP Poll

The 1967 Arizona Wildcats football team represented the University of Arizona in the Western Athletic Conference (WAC) during the 1967 NCAA University Division football season. In their first season under head coach Darrell Mudra, the Wildcats compiled a 3–6–1 record (1–4 against WAC opponents), finished in fourth place in the WAC, and were outscored by their opponents, 231 to 162. The team played its home games in Arizona Stadium in Tucson, Arizona.

A major highlight of the season occurred in late September, when the Wildcats captured an upset win at Ohio State, which was one of the biggest wins for the program at the time.

The team's statistical leaders included Mark Reed with 759 passing yards, David Barajas with 337 rushing yards, and Roger Brautigan with 247 receiving yards.

== Schedule ==
| Date | Opponent | Site | Result | Attendance | Source |
|---|---|---|---|---|---|
| September 16 | Wyoming | Arizona Stadium; Tucson, AZ | L 17–36 | 37,500 | |
| September 30 | at Ohio State* | Ohio Stadium; Columbus, OH | W 14–7 | 77,468 | |
| October 7 | at Missouri* | Memorial Stadium; Columbia, MO | L 3–17 | 45,500 | |
| October 14 | UTEP* | Arizona Stadium; Tucson, AZ | T 9–9 | 37,000 | |
| October 21 | Utah | Arizona Stadium; Tucson, AZ | L 29–33 | 35,500 | |
| October 28 | No. 10 Indiana* | Arizona Stadium; Tucson, AZ | L 7–42 | 33,500 | |
| November 4 | New Mexico | Arizona Stadium; Tucson, AZ (rivalry) | W 48–13 | 20,000 | |
| November 11 | at BYU | Cougar Stadium; Provo, UT | L 14–17 | 24,442 | |
| November 18 | Air Force* | Arizona Stadium; Tucson, AZ | W 14–10 | 27,300 | |
| November 25 | at Arizona State | Sun Devil Stadium; Tempe, AZ (rivalry) | L 7–47 | 41,567 | |
*Non-conference game; Rankings from Coaches' Poll released prior to the game
