= 1970 Wyoming Cowboys football team =

American college football season

1970 Wyoming Cowboys football
- Conference: Western Athletic Conference
- Record: 1–9 (1–6 WAC)
- Head coach: Lloyd Eaton (9th season)
- Captains: Tom Gorman; Dale Pernula
- Home stadium: War Memorial Stadium

1970 Western Athletic Conference football standings
| | Conf. | | | | | Overall |
| Team | W | | L | | T | W | | L | | T |
|---|---|---|---|---|---|---|---|---|---|---|
| No. 6 Arizona State $ | 7 | – | 0 | – | 0 | 11 | – | 0 | – | 0 |
| New Mexico | 5 | – | 1 | – | 0 | 7 | – | 3 | – | 0 |
| Utah | 4 | – | 2 | – | 0 | 6 | – | 4 | – | 0 |
| UTEP | 4 | – | 3 | – | 0 | 6 | – | 4 | – | 0 |
| Arizona | 2 | – | 4 | – | 0 | 4 | – | 6 | – | 0 |
| Colorado State | 1 | – | 3 | – | 0 | 4 | – | 7 | – | 0 |
| BYU | 1 | – | 6 | – | 0 | 3 | – | 8 | – | 0 |
| Wyoming | 1 | – | 6 | – | 0 | 1 | – | 9 | – | 0 |
$ – Conference champion; Rankings from AP Poll

The 1970 Wyoming Cowboys football team represented the University of Wyoming in the 1970 NCAA University Division football season. Led by ninth-year head coach Lloyd Eaton, they were members of the Western Athletic Conference (WAC) and played their home games on campus at War Memorial Stadium in Laramie.

The Cowboys compiled a record of 1-9 (1-6 against conference opponents), finished eighth in the WAC, and Eaton was reassigned to assistant athletic director. The controversial previous season had concluded with four consecutive losses, all on the road.

A week before the season opener, starting quarterback Ed Synakowski drowned in a boating accident while fishing with his brother on Lake Hattie, just southwest of Laramie.

Wyoming entered this year with 22 consecutive home wins, which started with the opener of the 1965 season, but the Cowboys lost all five games in Laramie in 1970.

== Schedule ==
| Date | Time | Opponent | Site | Result | Attendance | Source |
|---|---|---|---|---|---|---|
| September 19 | 1:30 p.m. | Air Force* | War Memorial Stadium; Laramie, WY | L 17–41 | 24,541 | |
| September 26 | | Utah State* | War Memorial Stadium; Laramie, WY (rivalry) | L 29–42 | 21,177 | |
| October 3 | | No. 18 Arizona State | War Memorial Stadium; Laramie, WY | L 3–52 | 17,170 | |
| October 10 | | at Colorado State | Hughes Stadium; Fort Collins, CO (rivalry) | W 16–6 | 24,430 | |
| October 17 | | Utah | War Memorial Stadium; Laramie, WY | L 16–20 | 5,518 | |
| October 24 | | New Mexico | War Memorial Stadium; Laramie, WY | L 7–17 | 16,589 | |
| October 31 | | at BYU | Cougar Stadium; Provo, UT | L 3–23 | 22,551 | |
| November 7 | | at UTEP | Sun Bowl; El Paso, TX | L 7–42 | 10,053 | |
| November 14 | | at Houston* | Houston Astrodome; Houston, TX | L 0–28 | 26,987 | |
| November 21 | | at Arizona | Arizona Stadium; Tucson, AZ | L 12–38 | 31,882 | |
*Non-conference game; Rankings from AP Poll released prior to the game; All times are in Mountain time

== NFL draft ==
One Cowboy was selected in the 1971 NFL draft, which lasted seventeen rounds (442 selections).

| Player | Position | Round | Overall | NFL team |
| Bob Jacobs | Placekicker | 7 | 170 | Cleveland Browns |

Defensive end Tony McGee, a Cowboy in 1969, was selected in the third round and played in the NFL for 14 seasons.
