= 1970 Colorado State Rams football team =

American college football season

1970 Colorado State Rams football
- Conference: Western Athletic Conference
- Record: 4–7 (1–3 WAC)
- Head coach: Jerry Wampfler (1st season)
- Offensive coordinator: Andy MacDonald (1st season)
- Defensive coordinator: Maury Bibent (1st season)
- Home stadium: Hughes Stadium

1970 Western Athletic Conference football standings
	Conf.					Overall
Team	W		L		T	W		L		T
No. 6 Arizona State $	7	–	0	–	0	11	–	0	–	0
New Mexico	5	–	1	–	0	7	–	3	–	0
Utah	4	–	2	–	0	6	–	4	–	0
UTEP	4	–	3	–	0	6	–	4	–	0
Arizona	2	–	4	–	0	4	–	6	–	0
Colorado State	1	–	3	–	0	4	–	7	–	0
BYU	1	–	6	–	0	3	–	8	–	0
Wyoming	1	–	6	–	0	1	–	9	–	0
$ – Conference champion; Rankings from AP Poll

The 1970 Colorado State Rams football team was an American football team that represented Colorado State University in the Western Athletic Conference (WAC) during the 1970 NCAA University Division football season. In its first season under head coach Jerry Wampfler, the team compiled a 4–7 record (1–3 against WAC opponents) and was outscored by a total of 256 to 206.

Colorado State's junior running back, Lawrence McCutcheon, rushed for 1,008 yards and caught 34 passes for 486 yards. Other statistical leaders on the 1970 Colorado State team include quarterback Wayne Smith with 1,861 passing yards and Tim Labus with 573 receiving yards.

== Schedule ==
Date	Time	Opponent	Site	Result	Attendance	Source
September 12		at New Mexico State*	Memorial Stadium; Las Cruces, NM	W 28–9	15,210	
September 19		at No. 20 Arizona State	Sun Devil Stadium; Tempe, AZ	L 9–28	43,504	
September 26	12:30 p.m.	at Iowa State*	Clyde Williams Field; Ames, IA	L 6–37	23,453–25,000	
October 3	1:30 p.m.	at No. 10 Air Force*	Falcon Stadium; Colorado Springs, CO (rivalry)	L 22–37	29,030	
October 10		Wyoming	Hughes Stadium; Fort Collins, CO (rivalry)	L 6–16	24,430	
October 17		UTEP	Hughes Stadium; Fort Collins, CO	L 37–41	20,879	
October 24		at West Virginia*	Mountaineer Field; Morgantown, WV	L 21–24	28,000	
October 31		Utah State*^{†}	Hughes Stadium; Fort Collins, CO	W 20–13	20,156	
November 7		BYU	Hughes Stadium; Fort Collins, CO	W 26–9	20,034	
November 14	1:30 p.m.	Pacific (CA)*	Hughes Stadium; Fort Collins, CO	W 17–8	19,758	
November 21	6:00 p.m.	at No. 15 Toledo*	Glass Bowl; Toledo, OH	L 14–24	14,521	
*Non-conference game; ^{†}Homecoming; Rankings from AP Poll released prior to the game; All times are in Mountain time

== Roster ==
1970 Colorado State Rams football team roster
Players
Coaches
Offense

Pos.	#	Name	Class
TE	81	John Allen	Sr
RB	30	Lawrence McCutcheon	Jr
QB	9	Scott Simmons	Sr
QB	7	Wayne Smith	Sr

Defense

Pos.	#	Name	Class
CB	45	Phil Webb	Sr

Special teams

Pos.	#	Name	Class
P	10	Ted Hill	Jr

Head coach

- Jerry Wampfler

Coordinators/assistant coaches

Legend

- (C) Team captain
- (S) Suspended
- (I) Ineligible
- Injured
- Redshirt
