= 1968 Sugar Bowl =

American college football game

- 34th Sugar Bowl
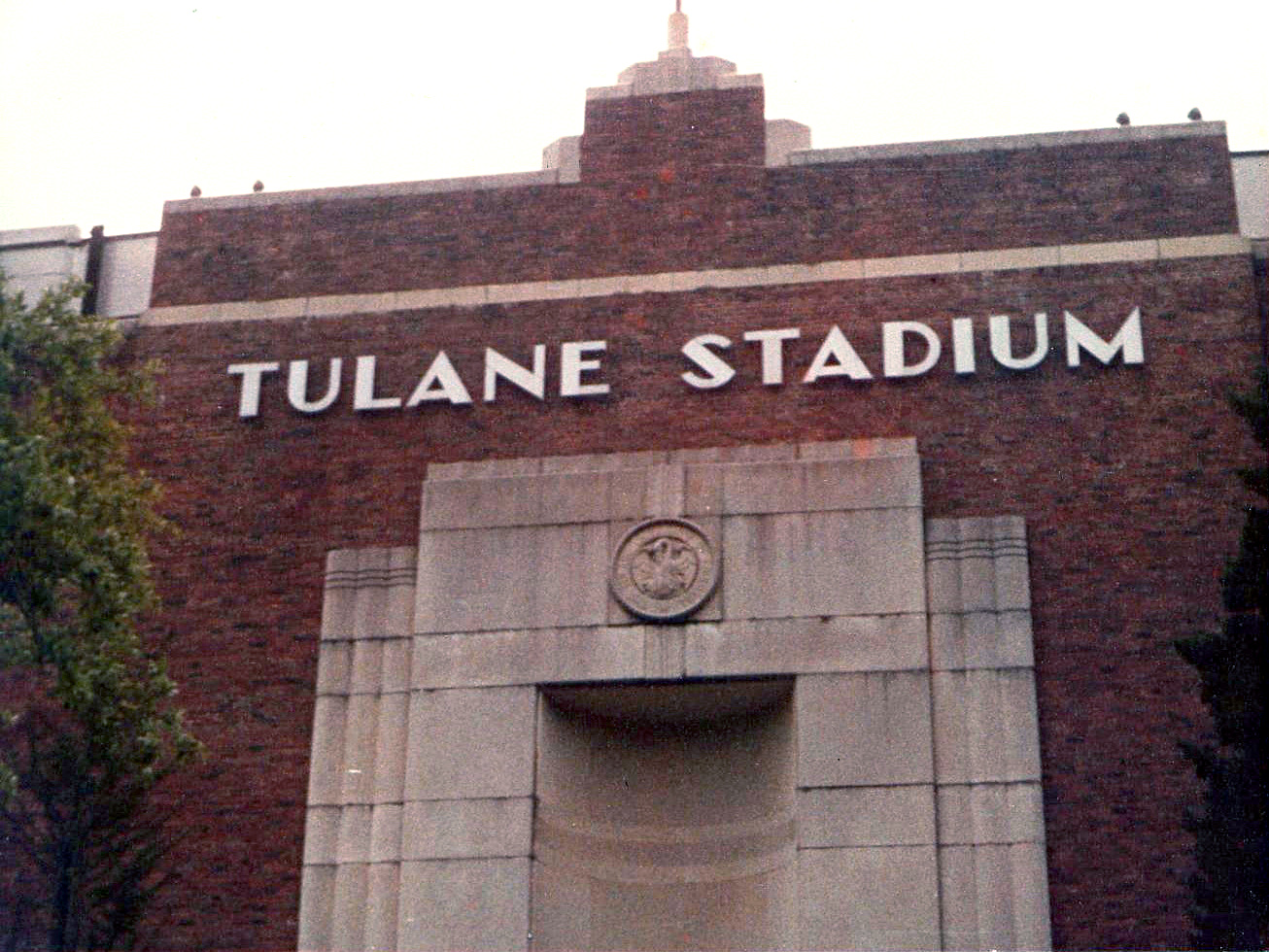
- Tulane Stadium in New Orleans, Louisiana, hosted the Sugar Bowl.
| Wyoming Cowboys | LSU Tigers |
| (10–0) | (6–3–1) |
| WAC | SEC |
| 13 | 20 |
| Head coach: Lloyd Eaton | Head coach: Charles McClendon |
| AP / Coaches; 6 / 5 |
| | 1 | 2 | 3 | 4 | Total |
|---|---|---|---|---|---|
| Wyoming | 0 | 13 | 0 | 0 | 13 |
| LSU | 0 | 0 | 7 | 13 | 20 |
- Date: January 1, 1968
- Season: 1967
- Stadium: Tulane Stadium
- Location: New Orleans, Louisiana
- MVP: Glenn Smith (LSU RB)
- Favorite: LSU by 7
- Referee: James M. Artley (SEC); split crew: SEC, WAC)
- Attendance: 78,963

United States TV coverage
- Network: NBC
- Announcers: Charlie Jones; Elmer Angsman

The 1968 Sugar Bowl was the 34th edition of the college football bowl game, played at Tulane Stadium in New Orleans, Louisiana, on Monday, January 1. The unranked LSU Tigers of the Southeastern Conference (SEC) rallied to top the undefeated and sixth-ranked Wyoming Cowboys of the Western Athletic Conference (WAC), 20–13.

Entering the bowl season, Wyoming was the only undefeated team in the nation among major schools, but LSU was favored by a touchdown, largely because it had faced a tougher schedule than the Cowboys and virtual home field advantage, as the Tigers were playing just eighty miles (130 km) from their campus.

== Game summary ==
The first game of a major bowl tripleheader (Rose, Orange) on NBC, it kicked off at 1 pm CST. Following morning rains, the game was played on soggy natural turf in clammy 45 °F (7 °C) temperatures.

After a scoreless first quarter, Wyoming drove eighty yards and scored on a one-yard sweep run from halfback Jim Kiick; Jerry DePoyster added field goals of 24 and 49 yards and the Cowboys led 13–0 at halftime.

In the third quarter, LSU running back Glenn Smith came off of the bench and scored on a one-yard touchdown run, making the score 13–7. In the fourth quarter, Tiger quarterback Nelson Stokley completed touchdown passes of eight and fourteen yards to end Tommy Morel as LSU rallied for a 20–13 win. The last score occurred with more than four minutes remaining; quarterback Paul Toscano advanced the Cowboys deep into LSU territory, but Wyoming flanker Gene Huey was tackled in-bounds on the five-yard line and time ran out.

Smith, a third-string sophomore from New Orleans' Holy Cross High School, entered the game late in the third quarter and was named the game's most valuable player.

== Scoring ==
First quarter

No scoring

Second quarter

- Wyo – Jim Kiick 1 run (Jerry DePoyster kick), 14:56
- Wyo – DePoyster 24 FG, 2:58
- Wyo – DePoyster 49 FG, 0:01

Third quarter

- LSU – Glenn Smith 1 run (Roy Hurd kick), 2:10

Fourth quarter

- LSU – Tommy Morel 8 pass from Nelson Stokley (Hurd kick), 11:39
- LSU – Morel 14 pass from Stokley (Hurd kick), 4:22

== Statistics ==
| Statistics | Wyoming | LSU |
|---|---|---|
| First downs | 20 | 12 |
| Rushing yards | 48–167 | 48–151 |
| Passes | 14–24–4 | 6–20–1 |
| Passing yards | 239 | 91 |
| Total offense | 72–406 | 68–242 |
| Punts–average | 4–49.0 | 9–37.1 |
| Fumbles lost | 1 | 0 |
| Turnovers | 5 | 1 |
| Penalties–yards | 5–65 | 3–25 |

== Aftermath ==
This was the only victory for the Southeastern Conference (SEC) this bowl season: Ole Miss lost the Sun Bowl, Alabama the Cotton, and Tennessee the Orange.

LSU's next major bowl appearance was three years later in the Orange Bowl. They did not return to the Sugar Bowl until 1985, and their next major bowl win was the 2002 Sugar Bowl.

This remains Wyoming's only New Year's Day bowl appearance.
