= Geoffrey White =

Geoffrey White may refer to:

- Geoffrey Saxton White (1886–1918), Royal Navy officer
- Geoffrey White (British Army officer) (1870–1959), British general

== See also ==
- Jeff White (disambiguation)
