= Mike Fanucci =

American football player (born 1949)

No. 68, 67, 71
- Position: Defensive end

Personal information
- Born: September 25, 1949 (age 77); Scranton, Pennsylvania, U.S.

Career information
- College: Arizona State
- NFL draft: 1971: 9th round, 219th overall pick

Career history
- 1972: Washington Redskins
- 1973: Houston Oilers
- 1974: Green Bay Packers
- 1975: Montreal Alouettes (CFL)
- 1976–1979: Ottawa Rough Riders (CFL)

Awards and highlights
- Grey Cup champion (1976); CFL All-Star (1978)
- Stats at Pro Football Reference

Michael Joseph Fanucci (born September 28, 1949) is an American former professional football player who was a defensive end in the National Football League (NFL) for the Washington Redskins, Houston Oilers, and Green Bay Packers. He later played with the Montreal Alouettes and Ottawa Rough Riders of the Canadian Football League (CFL). He played college football for the Arizona State Sun Devils.

Fanucci attended Dunmore High School and played football there; he graduated in the class of 1967.
