= Eric Washington (defensive back) =

American football player (1950-1984)

No. 40
- Position: Defensive back

Personal information
- Born: April 22, 1950 (age 76); Washington, D. C., U.S.
- Died: May 14, 1984 (aged 34)
- Listed height: 6 ft 2 in (1.88 m)
- Listed weight: 190 lb (86 kg)

Career information
- High school: McKinley Tech
- College: UTEP
- NFL draft: 1972: 10th round, 238th overall pick

Career history
- St. Louis Cardinals (1972–1973)
- Stats at Pro Football Reference

Eric Christopher Washington (April 22, 1950-May 14, 1984) was an American former professional football player who was a defensive back for the St. Louis Cardinals of National Football League (NFL). He played college football for the University of Texas at El Paso.
