= Tommy Hudspeth =

American football coach (1931–2015)

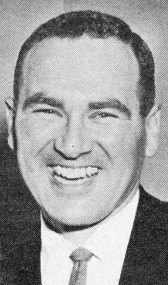
- Hudspeth, circa 1964

Biographical details
- Born: September 14, 1931; Cherryvale, Kansas, U.S.
- Died: June 23, 2015 (aged 83); Tulsa, Oklahoma, U.S.

Playing career
- 1950–1952: Tulsa
- Position: Defensive back

Coaching career (HC unless noted)
- 1953: Norman HS (OK) (assistant)
- 1956: Tulsa Central HS (OK) (assistant)
- 1957–1960: Tulsa (assistant)
- 1961–1963: Calgary Stampeders (assistant)
- 1964–1971: BYU
- 1972: UTEP (OC)
- 1972–1973: UTEP
- 1974: Chicago Fire (OB)
- 1976–1977: Detroit Lions
- 1981: Toronto Argonauts

Administrative career (AD unless noted)
- 1974–1975: Detroit Lions (scout)
- 1975–1976: Detroit Lions (CPS)
- 1979–1981: Toronto Argonauts (GM)

Head coaching record
- Overall: 40–56–1 (college); 11–13 (NFL); 2–4 (CFL)

Accomplishments and honors

Championships
- 1 WAC (1965)

Awards
- WAC Coach of the Year (1965)

Tommy Joe Hudspeth (September 14, 1931 – June 23, 2015) was an American and Canadian football coach and executive at both the collegiate and professional levels. He was the head coach at Brigham Young University (BYU) from 1964 to 1971, and the University of Texas at El Paso (UTEP) from 1972 through 1973, compiling an overall college football record of 40–56–1. Hudspeth served in the same capacity for the Detroit Lions of the National Football League (NFL) from 1976 until 1977, and Toronto Argonauts of the Canadian Football League (CFL) in 1981, posting a mark of 13–17.

== Career ==
=== Early positions ===
Hudspeth graduated from the University of Tulsa in 1953 after completing his playing career at the school. He moved into the coaching ranks that fall as an assistant coach at Norman High School in Oklahoma, then served the next two years in the military. Upon his release, he accepted an assistant position at Tulsa Central High School in 1956. Returning to his alma mater the following year, Hudspeth served as an assistant for the next four years, then moved up north to the Canadian Football League (CFL), working in a similar capacity with the Calgary Stampeders from 1961 to 1963.

=== BYU ===
In 1964, Hudspeth became a head coach for the first time, taking over the Brigham Young Cougars struggling football program. Husdspeth recruited a number of ex-Marines to play for the Cougars in his first couple of seasons and BYU saw a dramatic rise in its football fortunes. In his second season 1965 BYU won its first Western Athletic Conference (WAC) championship and posted a 6–4 record. Hudspeth led the Cougars to an 8–2 mark in 1966 and had two more winning seasons in 1967 and 1969. Over an eight-year span, he compiled a record of 39–42–1. Hudspeth is credited with recruiting the program's first black player, Ronnie Knight, in 1970, following pressure from the LDS leadership and the "Black 14" Incident with Wyoming the previous year. On January 22, 1972, Hudspeth resigned and was replaced by one of his assistant coaches, LaVell Edwards. Edwards built BYU into a national power by the end of the decade and later led the school to its first and only football national championship in 1984.

"I can't take any credit for what LaVell did at BYU", Hudspeth said. "LaVell was a brilliant coach. When we worked together back in the 1960s, LaVell already had a great understanding of what to do on offense. I recommended him when I left to take the job at UTEP, but everyone knew what a smart young coach he was."

=== UTEP ===
Hudspeth accepted a job as offensive coordinator at the University of Texas at El Paso (UTEP) shortly after leaving BYU. He became interim head coach on October 22, 1972, when head coach Bobby Dobbs resigned following a 56–7 loss. Hudspeth closed out the year 1–3, but followed up with a disastrous 0–11 record the next year. He was subsequently fired from UTEP.

=== Pro ranks ===
The advent of the new World Football League (WFL) in 1974 provided a new job opportunity for Hudspeth. He was hired as an offensive backs coach for the Chicago Fire. A major reason he was hired was because he had coached Chicago's quarterback Virgil Carter, at BYU. However, during the course of the season, the team's weak defense, coupled with severe financial troubles, eventually saw Hudspeth also take over the defensive backfield coaching duties.

Escaping from the ill-fated league, Hudspeth took an off-the-field job the next year as the coordinator of personnel and scouting for the Detroit Lions. He remained in that position until October 5, 1976, when Lions' head coach Rick Forzano resigned following a 1–3 start and Hudspeth was tabbed to replace him.

The new coach had mixed results during the remainder of the 1976 NFL season, with team owner William Clay Ford actively pursuing Los Angeles Rams head coach Chuck Knox to replace Hudspeth. After Knox elected to stay with the Rams, Hudspeth was re-hired on February 9, 1977, signing a three-year contract. Hudspeth and his entire coaching staff were dismissed only eleven months later on January 9, 1978, ending his Lions' tenure with an 11–13 mark.

On March 7, 1979, Hudspeth returned to Canada when he signed a three-year contract to become the general manager of the CFL's Toronto Argonauts. He would return as a head coach on September 14, 1981, when he replaced Willie Wood with the reeling Argonauts sporting an 0–10 record. Once again, he closed out the season, then returned to the front office.

=== Return to Tulsa ===
In 2006, Hudspeth was hired by University of Tulsa director of athletics Bubba Cunningham as an assistant in the area of development and fundraising for athletics.

Hudspeth died June 23, 2015, of cancer. He was 83 years old.

== Head coaching record ==
=== College ===
Year	Team	Overall	Conference	Standing	Bowl/playoffs
BYU Cougars (Western Athletic Conference) (1964–1971)
1964	BYU	3–6–1	0–4	5th	
1965	BYU	6–4	4–1	1st	
1966	BYU	8–2	3–2	T–2nd	
1967	BYU	6–4	3–2	3rd	
1968	BYU	2–8	1–5	7th	
1969	BYU	6–4	4–3	T–3rd	
1970	BYU	3–8	1–6	T–7th	
1971	BYU	5–6	3–4	T–4th	
BYU:		39–42–1			
UTEP Miners (Western Athletic Conference) (1972–1973)
1972	UTEP	1–3	1–3	8th	
1973	UTEP	0–11	0–7	8th	
UTEP:		1–14	1–10		
Total:		40–56–1			
National championship Conference title Conference division title or championship game berth
