= Mike Dirks =

American football player (born 1946)

No. 62, 55, 44, 64
- Positions: Defensive tackle, Guard

Personal information
- Born: August 28, 1946 (age 80); Monticello, Iowa, U.S.
- Listed height: 6 ft 2 in (1.88 m)
- Listed weight: 246 lb (112 kg)

Career information
- High school: Monticello
- College: Wyoming (1964-1967)
- NFL draft: 1968: 5th round, 122nd overall pick

Career history
- Philadelphia Eagles (1968–1970); Pennysylvania Firebirds (1970); Philadelphia Eagle (1971); Winnipeg Blue Bombers (1972–1974); Saskatchewan Roughriders (1974-1978)

Awards and highlights
- First-team All-American (1967)

Career NFL statistics
- Fumble recoveries: 2
- Sacks: 1
- Stats at Pro Football Reference

Marion Gearhart "Mike" Dirks Jr. (born August 28, 1946) is an American former professional football player who was a defensive tackle in the National Football League (NFL) with the Philadelphia Eagles from 1968 to 1971 for a total of 43 games. He played college football for the Wyoming Cowboys.
