= 1967 UTEP Miners football team =

American college football season

1967 UTEP Miners football

Sun Bowl champion

Sun Bowl, W 14–7 vs. Ole Miss
- Conference: Independent
- Record: 7–2–1
- Head coach: Bobby Dobbs (3rd season)
- Home stadium: Sun Bowl

1967 NCAA University Division independents football records
	Conf.			Overall
Team	W	L	T	W		L		T
Army		–		8	–	2	–	0
No. 5 Notre Dame		–		8	–	2	–	0
Syracuse		–		8	–	2	–	0
No. 10 Penn State		–		8	–	2	–	1
New Mexico State		–		7	–	2	–	1
UTEP		–		7	–	2	–	1
Utah State		–		7	–	2	–	1
Florida State		–		7	–	2	–	2
West Texas State		–		8	–	3	–	0
Houston		–		7	–	3	–	0
Virginia Tech		–		7	–	3	–	0
Memphis State		–		6	–	3	–	0
Southern Miss		–		6	–	3	–	0
Dayton		–		6	–	3	–	1
Xavier		–		6	–	3	–	1
Miami (FL)		–		7	–	4	–	0
Buffalo		–		6	–	4	–	0
Navy		–		5	–	4	–	1
Holy Cross		–		5	–	5	–	0
Colorado State		–		4	–	5	–	1
Boston College		–		4	–	6	–	0
Georgia Tech		–		4	–	6	–	0
Villanova		–		4	–	6	–	0
Air Force		–		2	–	6	–	2
Tulane		–		3	–	7	–	0
San Jose State		–		2	–	7	–	0
Colgate		–		2	–	8	–	0
Pittsburgh		–		1	–	9	–	0
Rankings from AP Poll

The 1967 UTEP Miners football team was an American football team that represented the University of Texas at El Paso as an independent during the 1967 NCAA University Division football season. This was the first season for the program, since changing its name from Texas Western to UTEP. In its third season under head coach Bobby Dobbs, the team compiled a 7–2–1 record, defeated Ole Miss in the 1967 Sun Bowl, and outscored all opponents by a total of 337 to 145. The September 23 game against San Jose State was canceled after student protests against racist policies on campus.

== Schedule ==
Date	Opponent	Site	Result	Attendance	Source
September 16	UC Santa Barbara	Sun Bowl; El Paso, TX	W 50–14	29,642	
September 23	at San Jose State	Spartan Stadium; San Jose, CA	Canceled		
October 7	at Arizona State	Sun Devil Stadium; Tempe, AZ	L 32–33	38,142	
October 14	at Arizona	Arizona Stadium; Tucson, AZ	T 9–9	37,000	
October 21	BYU	Sun Bowl; El Paso, TX	W 47–17	25,064	
October 27	at New Mexico	University Stadium; Albuquerque, NM	W 75–12	9,635	
November 4	New Mexico State^{†}	Sun Bowl; El Paso, TX (rivalry)	W 46–24	28,233	
November 11	Colorado State	Sun Bowl; El Paso, TX	W 17–0	22,000	
November 18	No. 6 Wyoming	Sun Bowl; El Paso, TX	L 19–21	35,023	
November 25	at Utah	Ute Stadium; Salt Lake City, UT	W 28–8	15,843	
December 30	vs. Ole Miss	Sun Bowl; El Paso, TX (Sun Bowl)	W 14–7	34,685	
^{†}Homecoming; Rankings from Coaches' Poll released prior to the game
