= Bobby Dobbs =

American gridiron football player and coach (1922–1986)

Biographical details
- Born: October 13, 1922; Munday, Texas, U.S.
- Died: April 2, 1986 (aged 63); Altus, Oklahoma, U.S.

Playing career
- 1942–1943: Tulsa
- 1944–1945: Army
- Position: Fullback

Coaching career (HC unless noted)
- 1949–1951: Carswell Air Force Base
- 1952–1954: Army (assistant)
- 1955–1960: Tulsa
- 1961–1964: Calgary Stampeders
- 1965–1972: Texas Western / UTEP

Head coaching record
- Overall: 71–63–4 (college)
- Bowls: 2–0

Robert Lee Dobbs (October 13, 1922 – April 2, 1986) was an American gridiron football player and coach. He served as the head football coach at the University of Tulsa from 1955 to 1960 and the University of Texas at El Paso (UTEP) from 1965 to 1972. Dobbs was also the head coach for the Calgary Stampeders of the Canadian Football League (CFL) from 1961 to 1965.

== Early years ==
After graduating from high school in Frederick, Oklahoma in 1941, Bobby entered University of Tulsa to play football for coach Henry Frnka. His brother, Glenn, was also a star at University of Tulsa. A fullback, Dobbs played in Tulsa's first ever bowl game; the 1942 Sun Bowl. With the United States involved in World War II, Bobby's patriotism, along with his desire to become a pilot and play football, led him to West Point. In early 1943, he joined the United States Army Air Corps. His athletic ability resulted in letters in football and basketball. Bobby was the starting fullback on the 1944 Army team. The 1944 Army team had a 9–0 record, two future Heisman Trophy winners (Doc Blanchard & Glenn Davis), and defeated their opponents by a combined score of 504–35 en route to winning the Associated Press national championship.

Following graduation, Dobbs took transition training at Enid Air Force Base and was then assigned to Davis-Monthan Air Force Base. In 1949 Dobbs moved to Carswell Air Force Base, where he coached the Carswell football team to the Armed Forces Championship. In 1952, Earl Blaik brought Dobbs back to West Point to serve as an assistant football coach. Future Green Bay Packers head coach Vince Lombardi was also on the same Army coaching staff.

== Coaching career ==
In 1955, Tulsa offered Dobbs the head football coaching job. Bobby accepted and left the Air Force. At Tulsa, he took over a team that had gone 0–11 the previous season. In 1956, Tulsa posted a 7–2–1 record, and in 1958, the team 7–3. These successes prompted Army to consider Bobby as a replacement for Red Blaik, but Dale Hall was given the job instead. Dobbs most significant wins at Tulsa were a 24–16 victory over the undefeated Oklahoma State Cowboys in 1958 and a 17–6 victory over tenth ranked North Texas State in 1959. Dobbs compiled a 30–28–2 overall record at Tulsa.

In 1961, Dobbs left Tulsa to become head coach of the Calgary Stampeders of the Canadian Football League. He was replaced at Tulsa by his brother, Glenn. After four highly successful years in Canada, Bobby resigned at the end of the 1964 CFL season. He felt that he had been slighted by Calgary's decision to elevate his former assistant, Rogers Lehew to general manager. With the Stampeders, Dobbs had a 38–23–1 record and made the playoffs every year.

He served as head coach at University of Texas at El Paso (known as Texas Western until 1967) from 1965 to 1972. In his first season as the Miners head coach, Dobbs turned a 0–8–2 team into an 8–3 that defeated powerhouse North Texas State 61-15 and beat Texas Christian University 13–12 in the Sun Bowl. He compiled a 41–35–2 overall, including two Sun Bowl wins. His 1967 UTEP team led the nation in passing and scoring that season, losing its two games by a total of three points. He resigned as UTEP Miners coach midway through the 1972 season, following a 56–7 loss to New Mexico on October 21, 1972. In April 1966, Dobbs turned down an offer to succeed Paul Dietzel as Army Black Knights coach due to his wife, Joanne's illness that required her to stay in the warm climate in El Paso. While at Texas Western, he sent many players into the pro ranks, with quite a few going, including Fred Carr, Billy Stevens, Ron Jones, and Leon Harden to Green Bay to play for Vince Lombardi. At one point Bobby ranked second among college coaches in number of players going in the National Football League. In 1972, Bobby said that if his 1–5 team didn't beat the University of New Mexico, he would resign. The team lost and Bobby resigned. He went into the construction business in El Paso until his health started to fail in 1978. Bobby's failing health turned out to be Alzheimer's disease, and he died on April 2, 1986, in a nursing home in Altus, Oklahoma.

== Head coaching record ==
=== College ===
Year	Team	Overall	Conference	Standing	Bowl/playoffs
Tulsa Golden Hurricane (Missouri Valley Conference) (1955–1960)
1955	Tulsa	2–7–1	1–3	T–4th	
1956	Tulsa	7–2–1	2–1–1	T–2nd	
1957	Tulsa	4–6	2–2	3rd	
1958	Tulsa	7–3	2–2	T–2nd	
1959	Tulsa	5–5	2–2	3rd	
1960	Tulsa	5–5	2–1	2nd	
Tulsa:		30–28–2	11–11–1		
Texas Western / UTEP Miners (NCAA University Division independent) (1965–1967)
1965	Texas Western	8–3			W Sun
1966	Texas Western	6–4			
1967	UTEP	7–2–1			W Sun
UTEP:		21–9–1			
UTEP Miners (Western Athletic Conference) (1968–1972)
1968	UTEP	4–5–1	3–3	4th	
1969	UTEP	4–6	2–5	6th	
1970	UTEP	6–4	4–3	4th	
1971	UTEP	5–6	1–6	8th	
1972	UTEP	1–5*	0–3		
UTEP:		20–26–1	10–20	*Hudspeth coached the remainder of the season	
Total:		71–63–4			
