= Gene Mack =

Canadian football player (born 1949)

Profile
- Positions: Guard, Linebacker

Personal information
- Born: February 25, 1949 (age 77); Greenville, Texas, U.S.
- Listed height: 6 ft 2 in (1.88 m)
- Listed weight: 213 lb (97 kg)

Career information
- College: Texas-El Paso
- NFL draft: 1971: 7th round, 180th overall pick

Career history
- 1971–1975: Toronto Argonauts
- 1977: Hamilton Tiger-Cats

Awards and highlights
- CFL East All-Star (1972)

Gene Mack (born February 25, 1949) is a Canadian football player who played professionally for the Toronto Argonauts and Hamilton Tiger-Cats.

After his retirement from football, Mack worked as an actor in film, television and theatre, and as a sports commentator for TSN's Off the Record with Michael Landsberg.
