= Wyoming Cowboys football =

Football team for the University of Wyoming

2026 Wyoming Cowboys football team
- First season: 1893; 133 years ago
- Athletic director: Tom Burman
- Head coach: Jay Sawvel; 3rd season, 11–20 (.355)
- Location: Laramie, Wyoming
- Stadium: War Memorial Stadium (capacity: 31,000)
- NCAA division: Division I FBS
- Conference: Mountain West
- Colors: Brown and gold
- All-time record: 572–617–28 (.482)
- Bowl record: 10–9 (.526)

Conference championships
- Skyline: 1949, 1950, 1956, 1958, 1959, 1960, 1961 WAC: 1966, 1967, 1968, 1976, 1987, 1988, 1993

Division championships
- WAC Pacific: 1996 MW Mountain: 2016
- Consensus All-Americans: 4
- Rivalries: Colorado State (rivalry); Hawaii (rivalry); North Dakota State (rivalry); Utah State (rivalry)

Uniforms
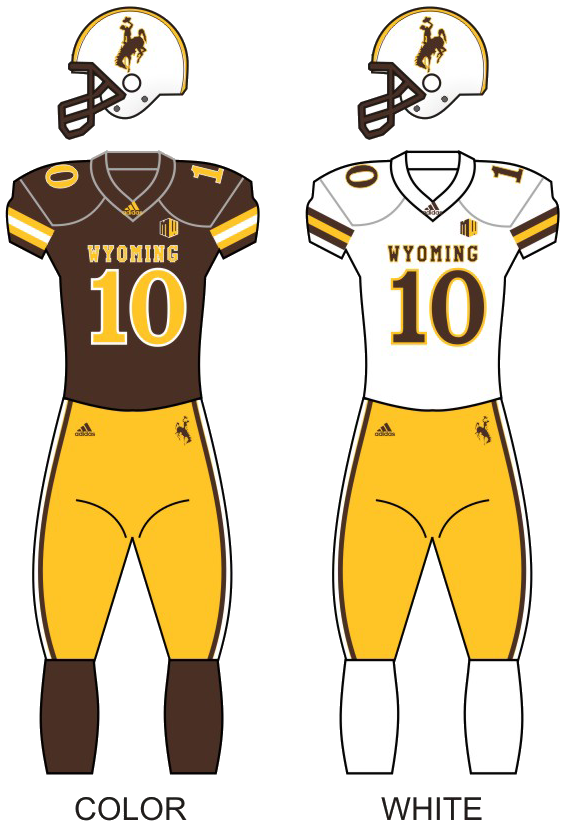
- Fight song: Ragtime Cowboy Joe
- Mascot: Cowboy Joe
- Marching band: Western Thunder
- Website: GoWyo.com

The Wyoming Cowboys football program represents the University of Wyoming in NCAA college football. They compete in the Mountain West Conference of the Football Bowl Subdivision (FBS) of NCAA Division I and have won 14 conference titles. Their current head coach is Jay Sawvel who is entering his second season as head coach in 2025 after serving as the program’s Defensive Coordinator for the previous four seasons.

The Cowboy football program has been among the most notable of "stepping stone" programs due to the success of its former coaches. Coaches such as Bowden Wyatt, Bob Devaney, Fred Akers, Pat Dye, Dennis Erickson and Joe Tiller were at Wyoming immediately prior to gaining notoriety at bigger football powerhouses.

== History ==
After struggling for much of the first half of the century, Wyoming football rose to regional power status in the late 1940s. Between 1949 and 1961, the Cowboys won the Mountain States Conference championship seven times, including four in a row under coach Bob Devaney from 1958 to 1961. After joining the Western Athletic Conference in 1962, the program added three more championships from 1966 to 1968, led by coach Lloyd Eaton.

=== Black 14 ===
In 1969, 14 black team members wore black armbands to a practice, intending to protest the alleged racism they had experienced at their last game with an upcoming opponent, BYU. Head coach Lloyd Eaton expelled them from the team, "triggering an uproar that consumed the rest of the football season and much of everything else in the tiny college town of Laramie, Wyoming."

=== Later years ===
In 2018, filmmaker Darius Monroe released a documentary short about the athletes: Black 14. The short "uses only archival footage to tell the story, mostly from local ABC and NBC affiliates in Wyoming, letting the principals – from the students, to the coach, to the school president and even the state's governor – speak for themselves."

== Conference affiliations ==
- Independent (1893–1904)
- Colorado Football Association (1905–1908)
- Rocky Mountain Athletic Conference (1909–1937)
- Mountain States Conference (1938–1961)
- Western Athletic Conference (1962–1998)
- Mountain West Conference (1999–present)

== Championships ==
=== Conference championships ===
Wyoming has won 14 conference championships, ten outright and four shared.

Season	Conference	Coach	Overall record	Conference record
1949	Mountain States Conference	Bowden Wyatt	9–1	5–0
1950	Mountain States Conference	Bowden Wyatt	10–0	5–0
1956	Mountain States Conference	Phil Dickens	10–0	7–0
1958	Mountain States Conference	Bob Devaney	8–3	6–1
1959	Mountain States Conference	Bob Devaney	9–1	7–0
1960†	Mountain States Conference	Bob Devaney	8–2	6–1
1961†	Mountain States Conference	Bob Devaney	6–1–2	5–0–1
1966	Western Athletic Conference	Lloyd Eaton	10–1	5–0
1967	Western Athletic Conference	Lloyd Eaton	10–1	5–0
1968	Western Athletic Conference	Lloyd Eaton	7–3	6–1
1976†	Western Athletic Conference	Fred Akers	8–4	6–1
1987	Western Athletic Conference	Paul Roach	10–3	8–0
1988	Western Athletic Conference	Paul Roach	11–2	8–0
1993†	Western Athletic Conference	Joe Tiller	8–4	6–2

† Co-champion

=== Division championships ===
Wyoming won the Western Athletic Conference's Pacific division championship in 1996 and lost in the league's championship game. Wyoming shared the Mountain West's Mountain division championship in 2016 and lost in the league's championship game.

Season	Division	Coach	Opponent	CG result
1996	WAC – Pacific	Joe Tiller	BYU	L 25–28 (OT)
2016†	MW – Mountain	Craig Bohl	San Diego State	L 24–27

† Co-champion

== Head coaches ==
Tenure	Coach	Seasons	Record	Pct.
1893–1894, 1898	Fred Hess	3	4–4	.500
1894–1897, 1899	J.F. Soule	5	8–1–1	.850
1900–1906	William McMurray	7	16–11–1	.589
1907–1908	Robert Ehlman	2	3–3	.500
1909–1911	Harold I. Dean	3	11–12–1	.479
1912	L.C. Exelby	1	2–7	.222
1913–1914	Ralph W. Thacker	2	1–10	.091
1915–1923	John Corbett	7	15–44–3	.266
1924–1926	W.H. Dietz	4	14–18–2	.441
1927–1929	George McLaren	2	3–14	.176
1930–1932	John Rhodes	3	10–15–2	.407
1933–1938	Willard Witte	6	16–30–3	.357
1939	Joel Hunt	1	0–7–1	.063
1940	Okie Blanchard	1	1–7–1	.167
1941–1946	Bernard Oakes	3	6–20–2	.250
1947–1952	Bowden Wyatt	6	39–17–1	.693
1953–1956	Phil Dickens	4	29–11–1	.720
1957–1961	Bob Devaney	5	35–10–5	.750
1962–1970	Lloyd Eaton	9	57–33–2	.630
1971–1974	Fritz Shurmur	4	15–29	.341
1975–1976	Fred Akers	2	10–13	.435
1977–1979	Bill Lewis	3	14–20–1	.414
1980	Pat Dye	1	6–5	.545
1981–1985	Al Kincaid	5	29–29	.500
1986	Dennis Erickson	1	6–6	.500
1987–1990	Paul Roach	4	35–15	.700
1991–1996	Joe Tiller	6	39–30–1	.564
1997–1999	Dana Dimel	3	23–12	.657
2000–2002	Vic Koenning	3	5–29	.147
2003–2008	Joe Glenn	6	30–41	.423
2009–2013	Dave Christensen	5	27–35	.435
2014–2023	Craig Bohl	10	61–60	.504
2024–present	Jay Sawvel	3	7–18	.280

== Bowl games ==
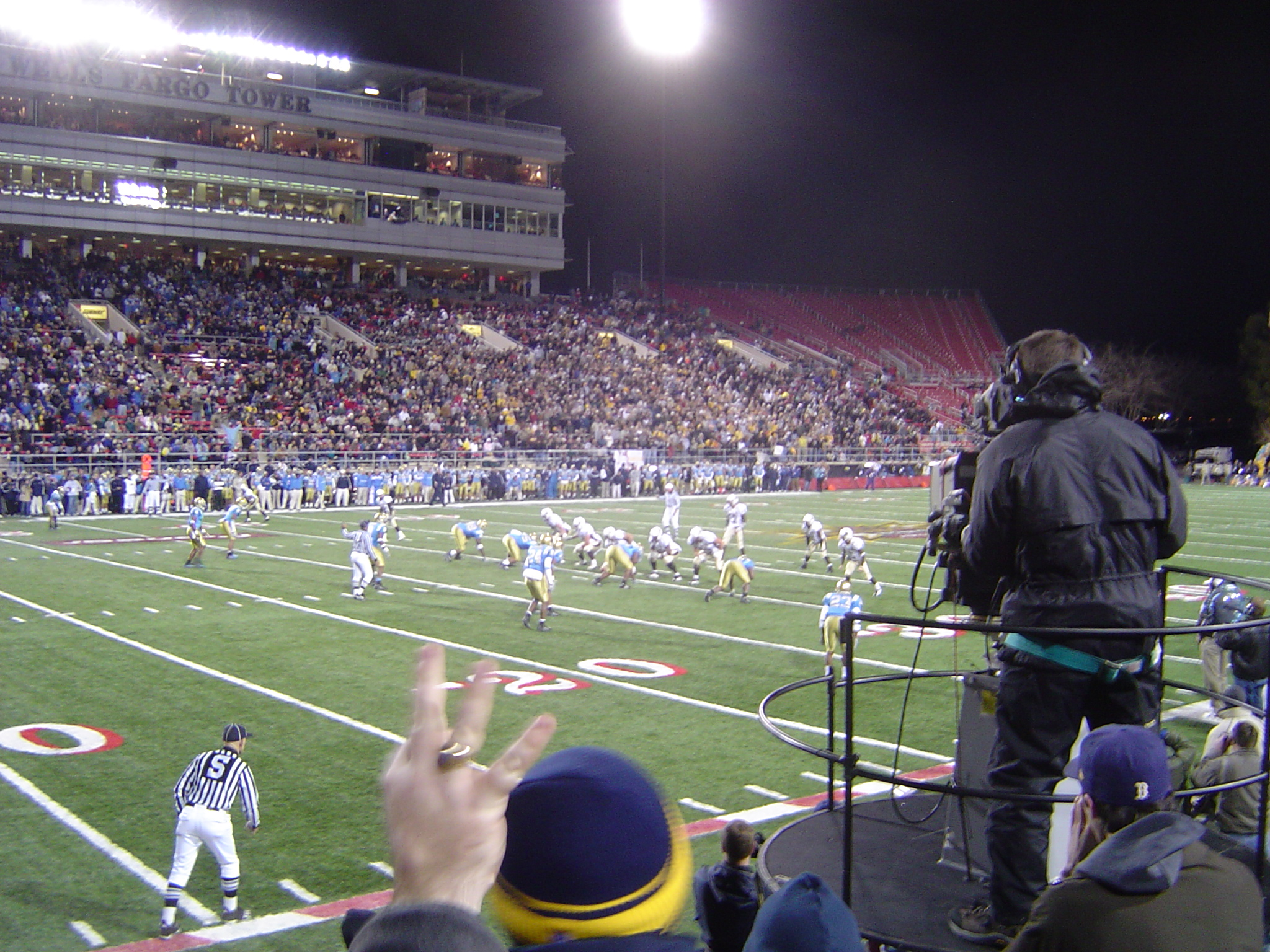
Wyoming defeated UCLA in the 2004 Las Vegas Bowl to end their six bowl game losing streak.

The Cowboys have appeared in 19 bowl games and have a record of ten wins and nine losses (10–9). Their most recent bowl appearance was a 16 – 15 come-from-behind win over the Toledo Rockets in the 2023 Arizona Bowl on December 30, 2023 for their 19th Bowl game.

Season	Coach	Bowl	Opponent	Result
1950	Bowden Wyatt	Gator Bowl	Washington & Lee	W 20–7
1955	Phil Dickens	Sun Bowl	Texas Tech	W 21–14
1958	Bob Devaney	Sun Bowl	Hardin-Simmons	W 14–7
1966	Lloyd Eaton	Sun Bowl	Florida State	W 28–20
1967	Lloyd Eaton	Sugar Bowl	LSU	L 13–20
1976	Fred Akers	Fiesta Bowl	Oklahoma	L 7–41
1987	Paul Roach	Holiday Bowl	Iowa	L 19–20
1988	Paul Roach	Holiday Bowl	Oklahoma State	L 14–62
1990	Paul Roach	Copper Bowl	California	L 15–17
1993	Joe Tiller	Copper Bowl	Kansas State	L 17–52
2004	Joe Glenn	Las Vegas Bowl	UCLA	W 24–21
2009	Dave Christensen	New Mexico Bowl	Fresno State	W 35–28 ^{2OT}
2011	Dave Christensen	New Mexico Bowl	Temple	L 15–37
2016	Craig Bohl	Poinsettia Bowl	BYU	L 21–24
2017	Craig Bohl	Famous Idaho Potato Bowl	Central Michigan	W 37–14
2019	Craig Bohl	Arizona Bowl	Georgia State	W 38–17
2021	Craig Bohl	Famous Idaho Potato Bowl	Kent State	W 52–38
2022	Craig Bohl	Arizona Bowl	Ohio	L 27–30 ^{1OT}
2023	Craig Bohl	Arizona Bowl	Toledo	W 16–15

== Stadiums ==
War Memorial Stadium before a game in 2015

War Memorial Stadium was built in 1950 with an original capacity of 20,000 fans; the current capacity is 29,181 after the completion of 2009–2010 stadium upgrades.

It is the highest Division I FBS football stadium in the nation; the elevation of its playing field exceeds 7,200 feet (2,195 m) above sea level. The playing surface was natural grass until 2005, when infilled artificial turf was installed.

Prior to War Memorial Stadium, the Cowboys played at Corbett Field, a small field located southeast of Half Acre Gym where the Business Building and the Student Union parking lot now sit. It was named for John J. Corbett, longtime all-sport coach and director of physical education at the school. The field was the first official stadium for the Cowboys; previously they had played on Prexy's Pasture, the main green of the school.

== Rivalries ==
=== Colorado State ===
The Bronze Boot is awarded to the winner of the college football game between Wyoming and Colorado State Rams in nearby Fort Collins, Colorado. Laramie and Fort Collins are only about 65 miles apart. The annual game has evolved into one of the most bitterly contested rivalries in college football. The teams have waged the "Border War" over 100 times since the schools began playing in 1899, playing every year except 1901, 1902, 1906, 1907, 1918, 1924, 1926, 1927, 1928, 1943, 1944, and 1945. This is one of the oldest interstate rivalries west of the Mississippi River. Until the 1949 game, CSU led the series 30–5–5. From the 1949 game onward, Wyoming has a record of 46–29 against the Rams. The series is the oldest rivalry for both schools and the Border War has been played in three different centuries. CSU leads the series 61–52–5.

=== Hawaii ===
The Paniolo Trophy is awarded to the winner of the college football games played between Wyoming and Hawaii Rainbow Warriors football. This rivalry started in 1979 when Hawaii joined the Western Athletic Conference and was played annually until 1997, shortly before Wyoming joined the newly formed Mountain West Conference. Hawaii joined the MWC as a football–only affiliate member in 2012, renewing the rivalry. Wyoming leads the series 18–12.

=== Utah State ===
Bridger's Battle is the name for the games played between Wyoming and Utah State, the winner is awarded the trophy of the rivalry, a .50 caliber Rocky Mountain Hawken rifle. The rivalry started in 1903, and renewed as an annual game in 2013 when Utah State joined the Mountain West Conference. However, with divisions going away in 2023, this streak of annual meetings ended. USU leads the series 41–28–4.

=== Other rivalries ===
Wyoming and Brigham Young have played each other 79 times, with BYU leading the series 46–30–3. BYU was arguably Wyoming's second biggest rival until BYU left the Mountain West to become an independent in 2011. Utah and Wyoming have played each other 85 times, which makes Utah Wyoming's most played opponent outside of Colorado State. Similar to the BYU series, the rivalry took a major blow when Utah left the MWC in 2010. UW's record against the Utes is 32–52–1. New Mexico and Wyoming have played each other 77 times. The Lobos and Cowboys have faced off every year since 1949 except for a 4-year stretch from 1995 to 1998. UW holds the advantage over UNM 41–36.

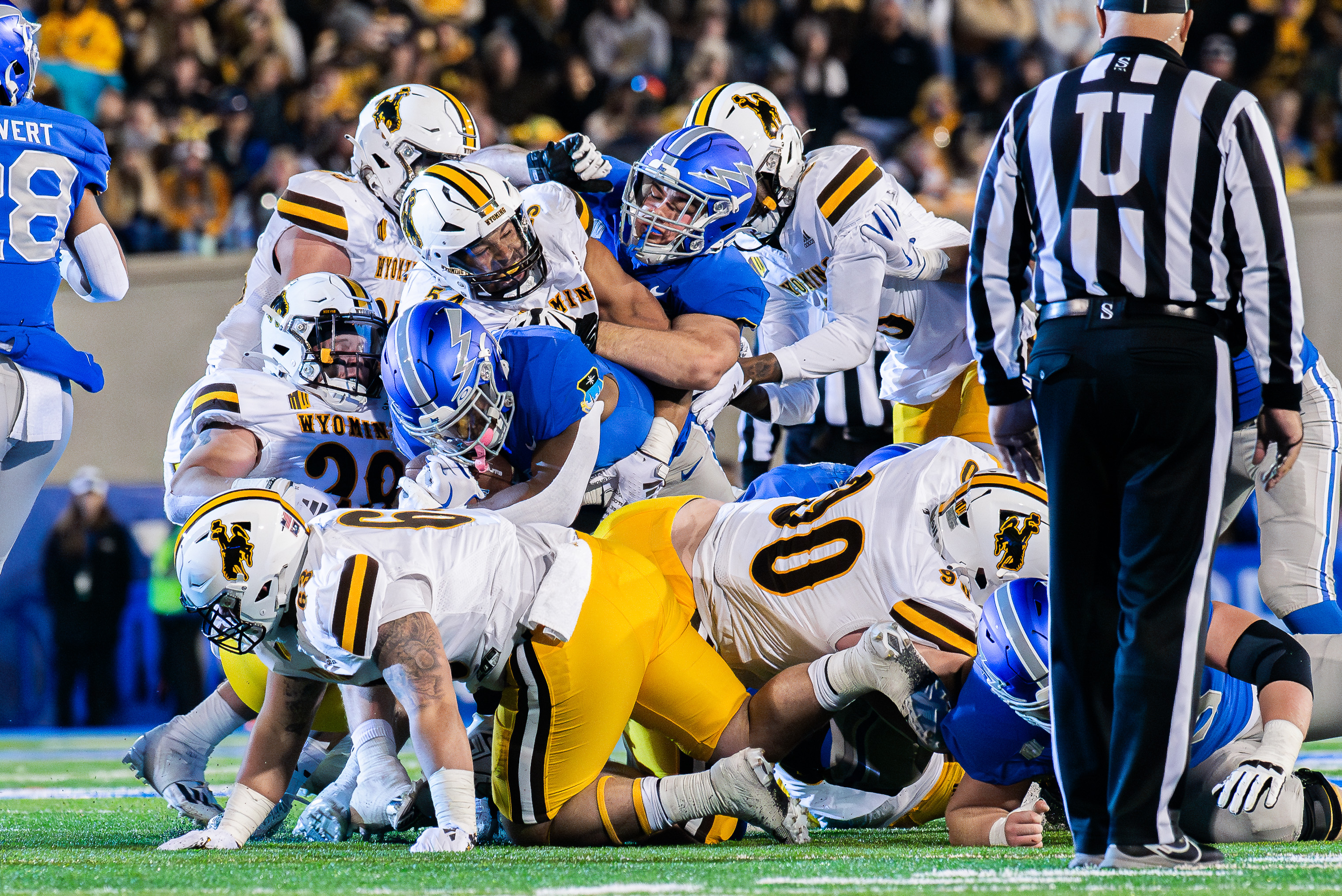
A matchup between Wyoming and Air Force in 2023

Air Force and Wyoming have played each other a total of 63 times. Their proximity has made them division rivals in multiple conferences. Two-time WAC Defensive Player of the Year Mitch Donahue once said “I hated them more than CSU. They were good, fast and little. They would bite at your heels all the time.” In 1998, #23 Air Force defeated number #25 Wyoming to win the WAC championship 10–7. In 2012 after Air Force defeated Wyoming, former Wyoming coach Dave Christensen went on a profanity-laced tirade about Air Force coach Troy Calhoun that drew national attention and a $50,000 fine for Christensen. This is a closely fought contest, with the Air Force Academy leading the all-time series 32–28–3.

== Notable NFL Alumni ==
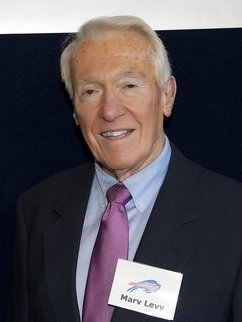
Marv Levy

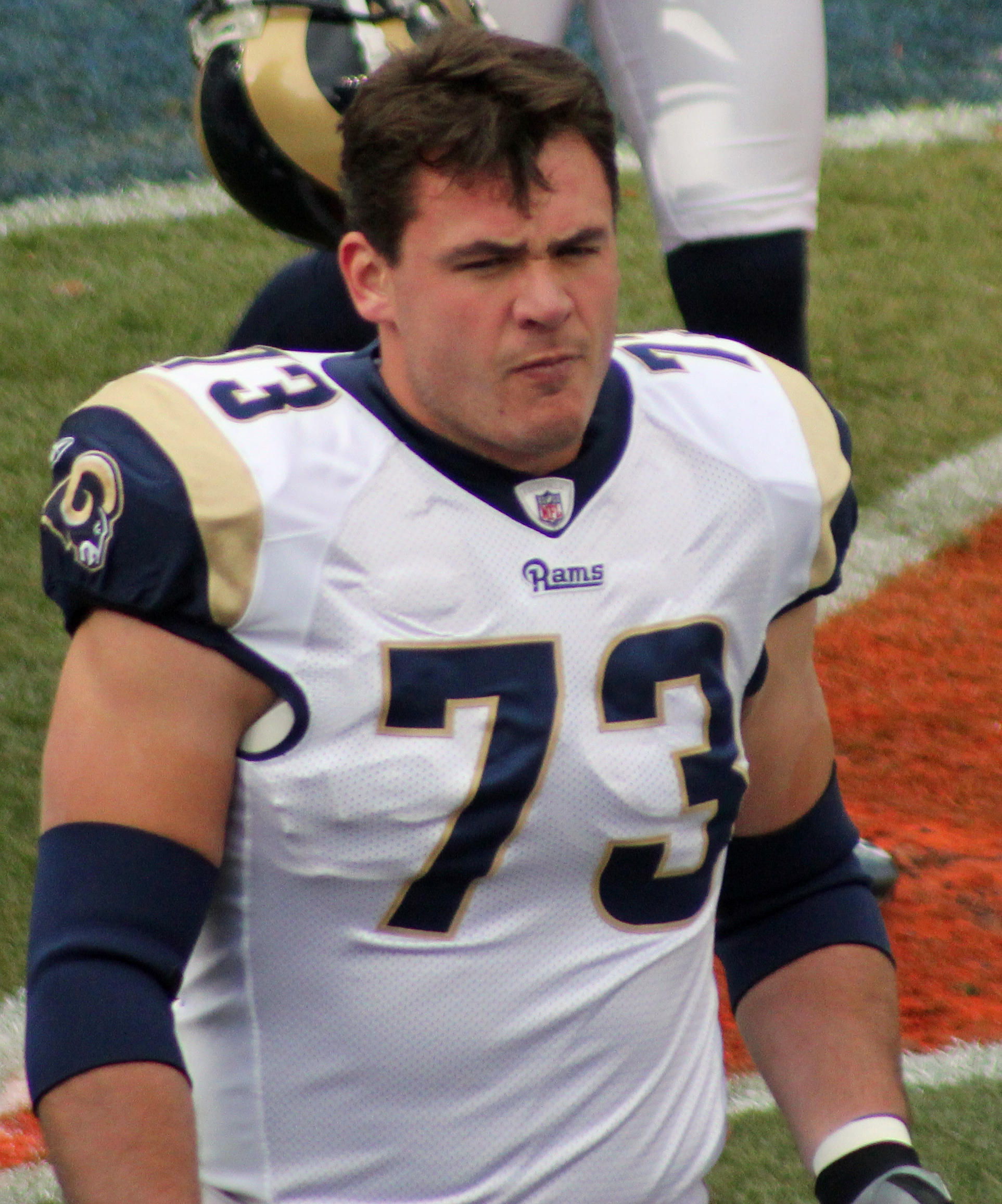
Adam Goldberg

Jay Novacek

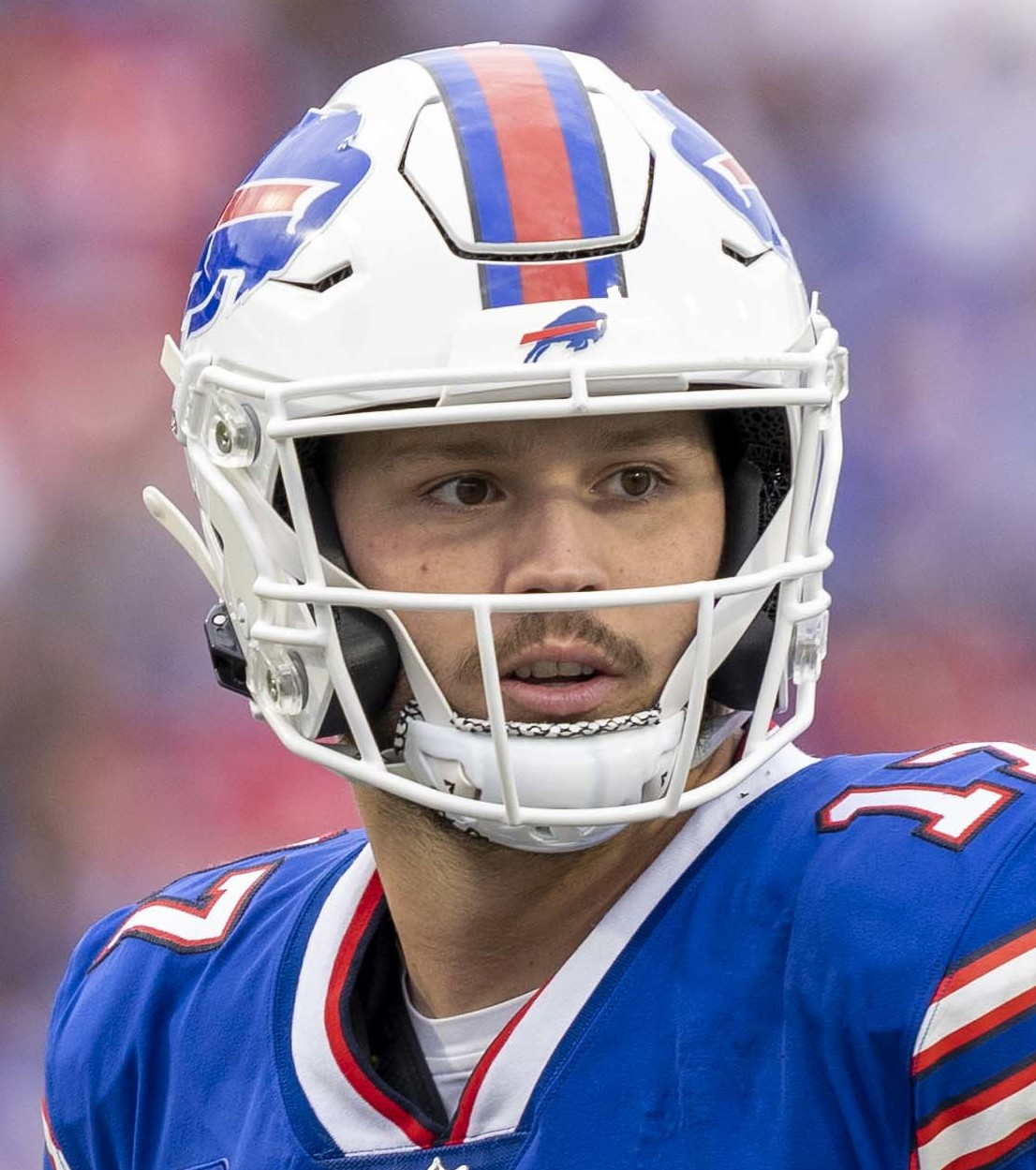
Josh Allen

- Mike Dirks (born 1946), defensive tackle; part of one of college football's best defenses in 1966 and 1967. He was selected as an All-American and All-Western Athletic Conference performer. He co-captained Wyoming's 1967 WAC Championship football team that finished fifth in the nation. Led the Cowboys to a 10–1 record and berth in the 1968 Sugar Bowl. He was part of the Cowboys line that was the nation's best rushing defense for two consecutive seasons. No team in the nation has since allowed fewer rushing yards than the 1966 and 1967 Wyoming defenses. Dirks produced 71 tackles, 30 unassisted tackles, and 26 tackles for a loss. He was inducted into the Wyoming Cowboys Athletic Hall of Fame on October 29, 1993.
- Adam Goldberg (born 1980), NFL offensive tackle. He became only the third junior in University of Wyoming football history to be elected a team captain when he was voted a captain by his teammates in the spring of 2001. He was Honorable Mention All-America and two-time First-team All-Mountain West Conference. He started 44 of 45 career games.
- Jerry Hill (born 1939), running back - was selected as Wyoming's Football Player of the Century during fan balloting in 1992. He was selected as an All-Skyline Conference running back in 1959 and 1960. In those two seasons, Hill was Wyoming's leading rusher. During his career, the Cowboys posted a 25–6 record. Hill was a member of the club that won the 1958 Sun Bowl. His career would finish with 1,374 rushing yards on 288 carries. He was inducted in the Wyoming Cowboys Athletic Hall of Fame on October 29, 1993.
- Jim Kiick (1946–2020), running back - Wyoming's leading rusher for each of his three seasons, 1965-67. He totalled 1,714 yards and ten touchdowns on 431 carries, and 561 yards and five touchdowns on 52 pass receptions. He was the first player ever to earn first-team All-Western Athletic Conference honors three times. Kiick was co-captain of the team as a senior. He was named the Most Valuable Player in the 1966 Sun Bowl victory over Florida State, rushing 25 times for 135 yards and two touchdowns, and catching four passes for 42 yards. He also played in the 1968 Sugar Bowl against LSU, rushing 19 times for 75 yards and a touchdown, and catching five passes for 48 yards. Kiick played in the 1968 Senior Bowl, and was selected to play in the 1968 College All-Star Game.
- Marv Levy (born 1925), defensive back - Levy attended Wyoming for a single semester following his stint as a meteorologist in World War II. The coach who had originally recruited him, Bunny Oakes, had left prior to the season; Bowden Wyatt, who succeeded Oakes, imposed a round-the-clock training regimen that did not allow Levy enough time to devote to his academic studies. Levy transferred to Coe College and established a long coaching career that led to a Grey Cup win with the Montreal Alouettes and four consecutive AFC Championships with the Buffalo Bills; these achievements earned Levy induction into the Canadian Football Hall of Fame and Pro Football Hall of Fame, respectively.
- Jay Novacek (born 1962), tight end - was a two sport All-American at Wyoming, also excelling in track. He was the Wyoming record holder in the decathlon and pole vault. As a football player, he was selected to the Kodak All-American football team in 1984. The selection was attributed to setting an NCAA record for receiving yards per receptions by a tight end. Novacek finished his Cowboys career with 83 career receptions for 1,536 yards and 10 touchdowns as a tight end. He was inducted in the Wyoming Cowboys Athletic Hall of Fame on October 29, 1993. He was also inducted to the College Football Hall of Fame on July 19, 2009.
- Josh Allen (born 1996), quarterback - a late recruit in 2015, Allen led the team to its first appearance in the Mountain-West Conference championship game in 2016 and two bowl games, receiving All-Mountain West honors. He finished his Wyoming career with 5,066 passing yards, 44 passing touchdowns, and 56 overall touchdowns, which rank in the top five for Wyoming Cowboys passing statistics. He was drafted 7th overall by the Buffalo Bills in 2018, becoming the highest drafted player in Wyoming Cowboys history. He is also the only player in Wyoming Cowboys history to win AP NFL MVP. Allen's jersey number 17 was retired on November 22, 2025, the first Cowboys alumnus to receive that honor.

== Honors and awards ==
- Mike Dirks, First Team All-Western Athletic Conference, 1967
- Mike Dirks, Football writers of America, Look Magazine, Newspaper Enterprise Association All-American, 1967
- Mike Dirks, Team Co-Captain on NCAA record setting defense
- Marcus Harris, Fred Biletnikoff Award, given annually to the most outstanding receiver in college football by the Tallahassee Quarterback Club Foundation, 1996
- Marcus Harris, Paul Warfield Trophy, Award given to the nation's top collegiate wide receiver by the Touchdown Club of Columbus, 1996
- Marcus Harris, inducted into the Wyoming Athletics Hall of Fame on September 24, 2004.
- Jerry Hill, First Team All-Skyline Conference, 1959, 1960
- Jerry Hill, Selected Wyoming Football Player of the Century, 1992
- Jerry Hill, Honorable Mention All-American, 1959, 1960
- Jerry Hill, Admiral Emory S. Land Award Winner
- Jim Kiick, Tailback, Most Valuable Player, 1966 Sun Bowl
- Leonard Kucewski, Guard, Most Valuable Player, 1958 Sun Bowl
- Jay Novacek, First Team All-Western Athletic Conference & Football All-American, 1984
- Easton Gibbs, LB, Pre-Season Defensive Player of the Year, Mountain West Conference, 2023

=== All-Americans ===
- C.T. Hewgley, Tackle, 1950 (APO-2nd)
- Eddie Talboom, HB, 1950 (APO-2nd; INSO-1st; CP-3rd) (2000 College Football Hall of Fame inductee)
- Dewey McConnell, DE, 1952 (APD-1st; NEAD-1st)
- Jim Crawford, RB, 1956 (NEA-1st, INS-2nd, CP-2nd, AP-3rd, UP-3rd, FWAA)
- Jerry Hill, RB,1959 (Honorable Mention)
- Jerry Hill, RB,1960 (Honorable Mention)
- Mike Dirks, DT, 1967 (FWAA-1st; NEA-1st)
- Jerry DePoyster, K, 1967 (AP-1st; FN-1st; TSN-1st)
- Paul Toscano, QB, 1967 (CP-3rd)
- Bob Jacobs, K, 1969 (FWAA-1st; TSN-1st)
- Larry Nels, DT, 1969 (CP-3rd)
- Paul Nunu, LB, 1976 (FN)
- Dennis Baker, DT 1977 (AP-1st)
- Mike Smith, P, 1979 (UPI-2nd)
- Jay Novacek, TE, 1984 (Honorable Mention) (2008 College Football Hall of Fame inductee)
- Marcus Harris, WR, 1995 (1st)
- Marcus Harris, WR, 1996 (1st) ( Consensus All-American, Fred Biletnikoff Award and Paul Warfield Trophy winner)
- Adam Goldberg (American football), RT/RG, 2002 (Honorable Mention)

== Retired numbers ==
Wyoming Cowboys retired numbers
No.	Player	Pos.	Tenure	Year retired	Ref.
17	Josh Allen	QB	2015–2017	November 22, 2025	

== Future non-conference opponents ==
Announced schedules as of April 8, 2026.

2026	2027	2028	2029	2030	2031	2032	2033	2034	2035	2036
at Colorado State	Southern Utah	Idaho State	Western Illinois	Northern Colorado	at Missouri State	at California	at Ball State	North Texas	Missouri State	Colorado State
Northern Colorado	at North Texas	Akron	California	at Arizona	Colorado State	Cal Poly	Arizona	at Colorado State	Colorado State	
at Central Michigan	Central Michigan	at Texas Tech	at UConn	North Texas		New Mexico State	Colorado State			
UConn	at Utah	at Colorado State	Colorado State			at Colorado State				

== Bibliography ==
=== References ===
- ""Biletnikoff Award (The)"" (archive url via Wayback Machine). Archived from the original on July 8, 2011.
- "Bronze Boot" (archive url via Wayback Machine). 2010. Archived from the original on July 27, 2011.
- "College Football Hall of Fame" (archive url via Wayback Machine). Irving, Texas: National Football Foundation & College Hall of Fame, Inc. 2010. Archived from the original on July 9, 2010.
- Des Moines Register, The. "Marv Levy named to Des Moines Sunday Register's Iowa Sports Hall of Fame".
- ESPN.com (December 23, 2004). "Bramlett Guides Fourth-Quarter Comeback" (archive url via Wayback Machine). AP. Archived from the original on May 19, 2011.
- "Films of UW Football and Basketball Games Now Accessible Online" (archive url via Wayback Machine). Fremont County, Wyoming: County10.com. May 29, 2014. Archived from the original on June 29, 2014.
- "Jonah Field at War Memorial Stadium". wyomingathletics.com (archive url via Wayback Machine). 2006. Archived from the original on October 12, 2007.
- Keeler, Sean (November 11, 2015). "'We Were Villains': How Wyoming's Black 14 Blazed the Trail for Missouri Protests". The Guardian (archive url via Wayback Machine) (blog ed.). Archived from the original on December 30, 2015. ISSN 0261-3077 (print), ISSN 1756-3224 (online); OCLC 60623878 (all editions).
- Lartey, Jamiles (March 10, 2018). "Wyoming's Black 14 Matter More Than Ever in Post-Kaepernick America". The Guardian (archive url via Wayback Machine) (blog ed.). Archived from the original on April 13, 2018. "Nearly 50 years after a group of black Wyoming football players were kicked off the team for even contemplating a protest, a new documentary gives their courage an overdue spotlight." ISSN 0261-3077 (print), ISSN 1756-3224 (online); OCLC 60623878 (all editions).
- "Schedules". "Wyoming Cowboys Football Future Schedules". FBSchedules.com.
- "Traditions" (archive url via Wayback Machine). University of Wyoming Athletics official website. 1993. Archived from the original on May 14, 2012.
- ""Traditions"" (archive url via Wayback Machine). University of Wyoming Athletics official website. 2004. Archived from the original on May 13, 2008.
