= 1967 Sun Bowl =

American college football game

Ole Miss Rebels	UTEP Miners
(6–3–1)	(6–2–1)
SEC	Independent
7	14
Head coach: Johnny Vaught	Head coach: Bobby Dobbs
	1	2	3	4	Total
Ole Miss	0	7	0	0	7
UTEP	0	0	0	14	14
- Date: December 30, 1967
- Season: 1967
- Stadium: Sun Bowl
- Location: El Paso, Texas
- Attendance: 34,685

The 1967 Sun Bowl featured the UTEP Miners and the Ole Miss Rebels.

== Background ==
Ole Miss had qualified for a bowl game every season since the 1957 season, and this was their 11th consecutive bowl season. They tied for 6th in the Southeastern Conference. The Miners were playing their first season after being renamed from Texas Western College to UTEP. This was their eighth bowl game, the previous seven also being in the Sun Bowl.

== Game summary ==
UTEP's Billy Stevens was named MVP for the second time, having been named MVP in 1965. Bruce Newell gave the Rebels their only score of the day on a touchdown run set up by Mac McClure's interception return. Trailing 7–0 in the fourth, Stevens went to work, leading the Miners on a 76-yard drive culminating with a touchdown pass to David Kerns to tie the game. A forced fumble by Fred Carr recovered by Dennis Bishop set up the Miners in the position to win the game, and Larry McHenry scored four plays later with 7:52 left. But Ole Miss could not make a successful drive as UTEP held on to win their second Sun Bowl in three years. Stevens went 13 of 26 for 155 yards, outyarding the entire Ole Miss team, who only had 109 yards of offense.

== Aftermath ==
This is to date, as of 2025, the last bowl game the Miners have won, and they have lost their past seven bowl games. They would also not get another bowl bid until 1988. They would join the Western Athletic Conference the year after this game. They have not reached the Sun Bowl since this game as well. Ole Miss would continue their bowl streak until 1971. Coincidentally, they also have not reached the Sun Bowl since this game.

== Statistics ==
Statistics	Texas Western	Ole Miss
First downs	16	6
Yards rushing	75	38
Yards passing	201	71
Total yards	276	109
Punts-Average	12-39.8	11-42.3
Fumbles-Lost	0-0	4-3
Interceptions	1	1
Penalties-Yards	9-92	5-33
