= Don Croft =

American football player (born 1949)

No. 72, 79
- Position: Defensive tackle

Personal information
- Born: January 7, 1949; Temple, Texas, U.S.
- Died: May 2, 2021 (aged 72)
- Listed height: 6 ft 4 in (1.93 m)
- Listed weight: 254 lb (115 kg)

Career information
- High school: Irving (Irving, Texas)
- College: UTEP
- NFL draft: 1972: 5th round, 115th overall pick

Career history
- Buffalo Bills (1972–1975); Detroit Lions (1976)

Career NFL statistics
- Sacks: 6.5
- Fumble recoveries: 3
- Stats at Pro Football Reference

Donald Thomas Croft (born January 1, 1949) is an American former professional football player who was a defensive tackle for four season in the National Football League (NFL) with the Buffalo Bills and Detroit Lions. He played college football for the UTEP Miners. Croft played in a total of 34 career games in the NFL between 1972 and 1976.
