= Jeff White (American football) =

American football player (born 1948)

No. 2
- Position: Placekicker

Personal information
- Born: June 10, 1948 (age 78); Bronxville, New York, U.S.
- Listed height: 5 ft 10 in (1.78 m)
- Listed weight: 170 lb (77 kg)

Career information
- High school: Bronxville
- College: UTEP (1967–1970)
- NFL draft: 1971: undrafted

Career history
- Kansas City Chiefs (1971–1972)*; Miami Dolphins (1973)*; New Orlean Saints (1973)*; New England Patriots (1973)
- * Offseason or practice squad member only
- Stats at Pro Football Reference

Jeffrey Charles White (born June 10, 1948) is an American former professional football placekicker who played for the New England Patriots of the National Football League (NFL). He played college football for the UTEP Miners.

== Early life and college ==
Jeffrey Charles White was born on June 10, 1948, in Bronxville, New York. He attended Bronxville High School in Bronxville.

White played college football for the UTEP Miners of the University of Texas at El Paso. He was on the freshman team in 1967 and was a three-year letterman from 1968 to 1970.

== Professional career ==
White signed with the Kansas City Chiefs after going undrafted in the 1971 NFL draft. However, he was later released. He signed with the Chiefs again in 1972 but was once again released.

White signed with the Miami Dolphins on February 19, 1973. On August 29, 1973, he was traded to the New Orleans Saints for an undisclosed draft pick. He was later released.

On October 2, 1973, White signed with the New England Patriots after the team released Bill Bell due to poor play. White played in 11 games for the Patriots during the 1973 season, converting 14 of 25 field goals and 21 of 25 extra points while also punting six times for 163 yards. He was released by the Patriots in 1974.
