= 1968 Cotton Bowl Classic =

- 32nd Cotton Bowl Classic
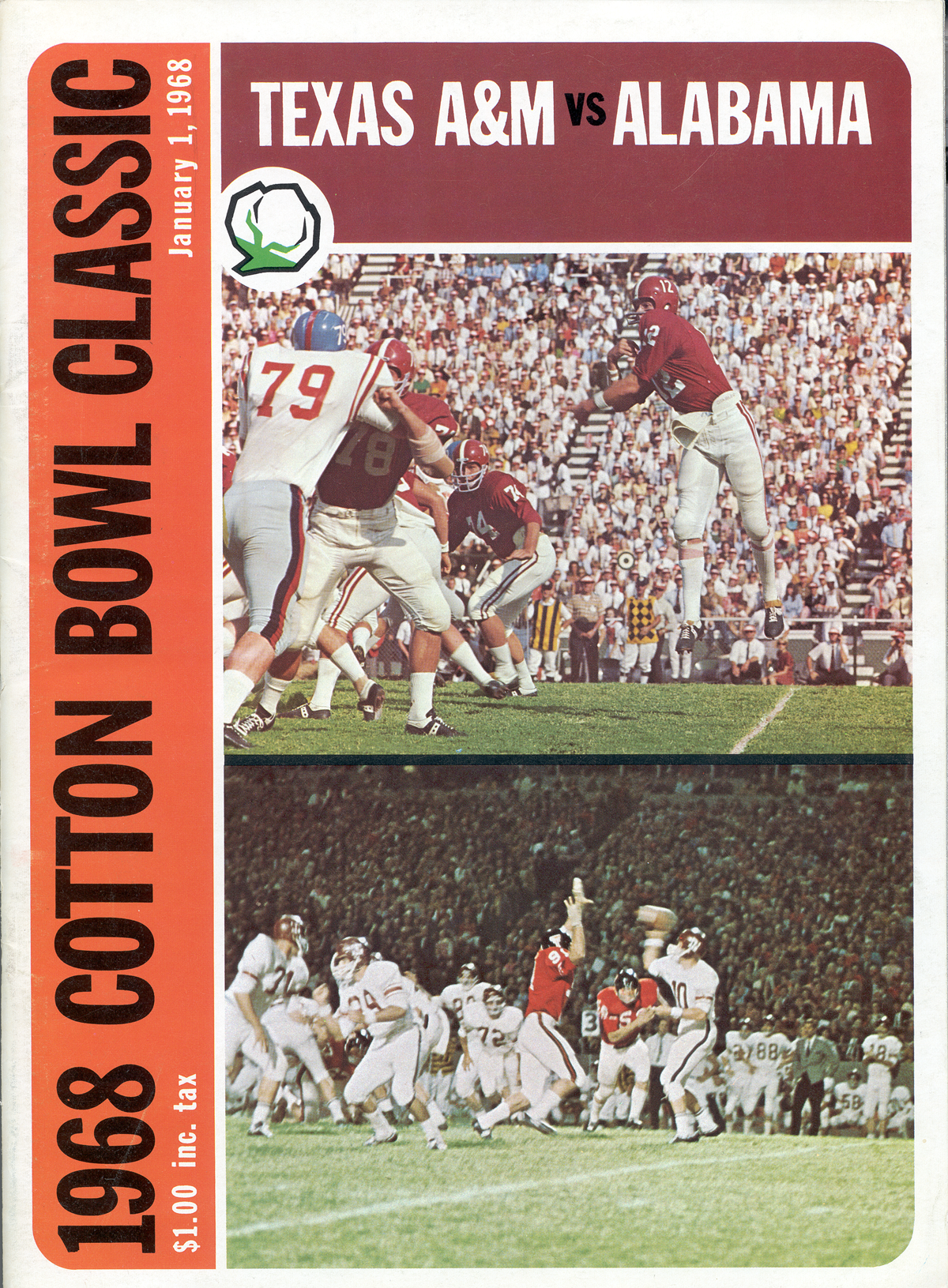
Texas A&M Aggies	Alabama Crimson Tide
(6–4)	(8–1–1)
SWC	SEC
20	16
Head coach: Gene Stallings	Head coach: Bear Bryant
	AP / Coaches; 8 / 7
	1	2	3	4	Total
Texas A&M	7	6	7	0	20
Alabama	7	3	6	0	16
- Date: January 1, 1968
- Season: 1967
- Stadium: Cotton Bowl
- Location: Dallas, Texas
- MVP: Grady Allen (Texas A&M DE); Edd Hargett (Texas A&M QB); Bill Hobbs (Texas A&M LB)
- Favorite: Alabama by 7 points
- Referee: E.D. Cavette (SEC; split crew: SEC, SWC)
- Attendance: 75,504

United States TV coverage
- Network: CBS
- Announcers: Lindsey Nelson, Johnny Sauer

The Cotton Bowl in Dallas, Texas, hosted the Cotton Bowl Classic.

The 1968 Cotton Bowl Classic, part of the 1967 bowl game season, was the 32nd edition of the college football bowl game, held at the Cotton Bowl in Dallas, Texas, on Monday, January 1. It matched the eighth-ranked Alabama Crimson Tide of the Southeastern Conference (SEC) and the unranked Texas A&M Aggies, champions of the Southwest Conference (SWC). Underdog Texas A&M won the game 20–16.

== Teams ==
=== Alabama ===
Alabama finished the regular season with an 8–1–1 record. The Crimson Tide were ranked second to start the season, but tied visiting Florida State in their opener and lost to eventual conference champion Tennessee a month later, also in Birmingham. Following their victory over South Carolina, Alabama accepted an invitation to the Cotton Bowl on November 20. The appearance marked the third for Alabama in the Cotton Bowl, and their 21st overall bowl game.

=== Texas A&M ===
Texas A&M finished the regular season with a 6–4 record, winning six straight after opening the season with consecutive losses to SMU, Purdue, LSU, and Florida State. With a 10–7 victory over rival Texas in the regular season finale, the Aggies secured their position in the Cotton Bowl as SWC champions. Third-year head coach Gene Stallings, age 32, was a former Aggie player (under head coach Bear Bryant). The appearance marked the third for the Aggies in the Cotton Bowl, and their eighth overall bowl game.

== Game summary ==
Alabama opened the game with a ten-play, 80-yard drive with quarterback Ken Stabler scoring on a three-yard run. The Aggies responded with a 13-yard Edd Hargett touchdown pass to Larry Stegent to tie the game at 7–7 at the end of the first quarter. After Steve Davis hit a 36-yard field goal on the first play of the second quarter for Alabama, A&M responded late in the quarter with a 7-yard Tommy Maxwell touchdown reception from Hargett. After the ensuing extra point failed, the Aggies took a 13–10 lead at the half.

A&M extended their lead to 20–10 early in the third after Wendell Housley scored on a 20-yard touchdown run. The final points of the game came later in the third when Stabler scored his second touchdown of the game, and with a failed two-point conversion attempt and a scoreless fourth, the Aggies won 20–16. For his performance, Texas A&M quarterback Edd Hargett was named the Most Valuable Player of the game. As A&M head coach Stallings was both a former player and assistant coach under him, Bryant carried him off the field to celebrate the victory.

Curley Hallman, a native of the Tuscaloosa suburb of Northport, Alabama, intercepted Stabler twice. Hallman later served as an assistant coach under Bryant from 1973 to 1976, an assistant at his alma mater from 1982 to 1987, and then head coach at Southern Mississippi (1988–90) and LSU (1991-94).

Scoring summary

Quarter	Time	Drive			Team	Scoring information	Score	
Quarter	Time	Plays	Yards	TOP	Team	Scoring information	Texas A&M	Alabama
1	8:22	10	80	6:38	Alabama	Ken Stabler 3-yard touchdown run, Steve Davis kick good	0	7
1	5:22	4	30		Texas A&M	Larry Stegent 13-yard touchdown reception from Edd Hargett, Charlie Riggs kick good	7	7
2	14:5x				Alabama	36-yard field goal by Davis	7	10
2	0:21		56		Texas A&M	Tommy Maxwell 7-yard touchdown reception from Hargett, Riggs kick no good	13	10
3	8:32	6	52		Texas A&M	Wendell Housley 20-yard touchdown run, Riggs kick good	20	10
3	3:55	9	83		Alabama	Stabler 7-yard touchdown run, 2-point run failed	20	16
"TOP" = time of possession. For other American football terms, see Glossary of American football.							20	16
