= 1970 Arkansas Razorbacks football team =

American college football season

1970 Arkansas Razorbacks football
- Conference: Southwest Conference

Ranking
- Coaches: No. 12
- AP: No. 11
- Record: 9–2 (6–1 SWC)
- Head coach: Frank Broyles (13th season)
- Offensive coordinator: Don Breaux (1st season)
- Offensive scheme: Multiple
- Defensive coordinator: Charlie Coffey (5th season)
- Base defense: 4–3
- Captains: Bill Burnett; Bill Montgomery; Dick Bumpas; Mike Boschetti
- Home stadium: Razorback Stadium; War Memorial Stadium

1970 Southwest Conference football standings
	Conf.					Overall
Team	W		L		T	W		L		T
No. 3 Texas $	7	–	0	–	0	10	–	1	–	0
No. 11 Arkansas	6	–	1	–	0	9	–	2	–	0
Texas Tech	5	–	2	–	0	8	–	4	–	0
Rice	3	–	4	–	0	5	–	5	–	0
SMU	3	–	4	–	0	5	–	6	–	0
TCU	3	–	4	–	0	4	–	6	–	1
Baylor	1	–	6	–	0	2	–	9	–	0
Texas A&M	0	–	7	–	0	2	–	9	–	0
$ – Conference champion; Rankings from AP Poll

The 1970 Arkansas Razorbacks football team represented the University of Arkansas in the Southwest Conference (SWC) during the 1970 NCAA University Division football season. In their 13th year under head coach Frank Broyles, the Razorbacks compiled a 9–2 record (6–1 against SWC opponents), finished in second place behind Texas in the SWC, and outscored all opponents by a combined total of 402 to 144. The team finished the season ranked No. 11 in the final AP poll and No. 12 in the final UPI Coaches Poll.

The Razorbacks began the season by losing 34-28 in a nationally televised night game at Little Rock (Arkansas' stadium in Fayetteville did not have lights at the time) vs. Stanford, led by standout quarterback Jim Plunkett. The Indians used the game as a springboard to the Pacific-8 Conference championship and a Rose Bowl triumph over Ohio State, with Plunkett earning the Heisman Trophy; he went on to be the No. 1 overall selection of the 1971 NFL draft by the Boston (changed to New England two months after the draft) Patriots.

The Stanford-Arkansas match was arranged by ABC after the NCAA allowed teams to schedule an 11th game starting in 1970.

Defensive tackle Dick Bumpas was a consensus All-American for Arkansas in 1970, with Chuck Dicus also earning first-team honors. Bill McClard averaged 7.3 points per game from the kicking position, the best in the nation for 1970. McClard converted on 50 of 51 extra points and 10 of 15 field goals. McClard connected on a 60-yard field goal against the Mustangs of SMU. This is the third-longest field goal in Arkansas history. Quarterback Bill Montgomery completed 80% of his pass attempts (12 of 15) against Oklahoma State, tied for sixth-best in Arkansas history in that category. Arkansas gained 658 yards (296 pass 362 rush) against TCU, the third most in the history of the Razorbacks.

The Razorbacks' October 24 game vs. Wichita State at Little Rock was the Shockers' first since the devastating plane crash three weeks earlier in Clear Creek County, Colorado which killed 14 players and 17 others, including WSU head coach Ben Wilson and athletic director Bert Katzenmeyer. Razorback fans saluted the Shockers' courage with standing ovations before and after the game.

For the second consecutive season, ABC asked Arkansas and Texas to move their annual showdown from its usual mid-October date to the first Saturday in December. The Longhorns, like the Razorbacks in 1969, agreed. It appeared to be a wise decision when Texas entered the game No. 1 and Arkansas at No. 4, but unlike the classic "Big Shootout" in Fayetteville 364 days earlier, there would be no drama in Austin.

The Longhorns bullied their rival 42-7 to clinch the UPI national championship and the accompanying Cotton Bowl berth to face Notre Dame, which fell from No. 2 to No. 6 after losing 38-28 at USC in its regular season finale.

Shortly after returning from their bludgeoning at Austin, the Razorbacks' bowl window slammed shut when LSU routed Ole Miss 61–17 to clinch the Southeastern Conference championship and an Orange Bowl bid vs. Big Eight Conference champion Nebraska. The Orange Bowl agreed to take the Southwest Conference runner-up if LSU lost either of its last two games vs. Tulane and Ole Miss. The Tigers defeated the Green Wave 26–14 one week prior to their destruction of the Rebels (who defeated Arkansas 27-22 in the previous season's Sugar Bowl). By making that deal, the Razorbacks withdrew themselves from consideration from lower-tier bowls such as the Bluebonnet, which took 6–5 Alabama to face Oklahoma, or the Sun, which invited the Razorbacks' SWC rival, Texas Tech, a 24–10 loser to Arkansas in Lubbock, to play Georgia Tech.

== Schedule ==
Date	Opponent	Rank	Site	Result	Attendance	Source
September 12	No. 10 Stanford*	No. 4	War Memorial Stadium; Little Rock, AR	L 28–34	48,000	
September 19	Oklahoma State*	No. 11	War Memorial Stadium; Little Rock, AR	W 23–7	53,000	
September 26	Tulsa*	No. 12	Razorback Stadium; Fayetteville, AR	W 49–7	40,000	
October 3	at TCU	No. 11	Amon G. Carter Stadium; Fort Worth, TX	W 49–14	39,136	
October 10	Baylor	No. 10	War Memorial Stadium; Little Rock, AR	W 41–7	53,000	
October 24	Wichita State*	No. 9	War Memorial Stadium; Little Rock, AR	W 62–0	40,000	
October 31	at Texas A&M	No. 8	Kyle Field; College Station, TX (rivalry)	W 45–6	34,000	
November 7	Rice	No. 7	Razorback Stadium; Fayetteville, AR	W 38–14	40,000	
November 14	SMU	No. 7	Razorback Stadium; Fayetteville, AR	W 36–3	43,500	
November 21	at No. 19 Texas Tech	No. 6	Jones Stadium; Lubbock, TX (rivalry)	W 24–10	50,125	
December 5	at No. 1 Texas	No. 4	Memorial Stadium; Austin, TX (rivalry)	L 7–42	68,510	
*Non-conference game; Rankings from AP Poll released prior to the game

== Roster ==
1970 Arkansas Razorbacks football team roster
Players
Coaches
Offense

Pos.	#	Name	Class
RB	33	Bill Burnett	Sr
WR	20	Chuck Dicus	Sr
QB	11	Joe Ferguson	So
OT	78	Mike Kelson	Jr
QB	10	Bill Montgomery (C)	Sr
WR	26	Mike Reppond	So

Defense

Pos.	#	Name	Class
DT	61	Dick Bumpas	Sr
DT	63	Roger Harnish	Jr
DE	85	Bruce James	Sr
DB	18	Jerry Moore	Sr
DE	89	Dave Reavis	So

Special teams

Pos.	#	Name	Class
K	19	Bill McClard	Jr
K	83	Tim Webster	Sr

Head coach

- Frank Broyles

Coordinators/assistant coaches

Don Breaux
Charlie Coffey
Joe Gibbs
Merv Johnson

Legend

- (C) Team captain
- (S) Suspended
- (I) Ineligible
- Injured
- Redshirt

== Team players in the 1971 NFL draft ==
Player	Position	Round	Pick	NFL club
Jerry Moore	Defensive back	4	89	Chicago Bears
Chuck Dicus	Wide receiver	7	169	San Diego Chargers
