= 1967 Rice Owls football team =

American college football season

1967 Rice Owls football
- Conference: Southwest Conference
- Record: 4–6 (2–5 SWC)
- Head coach: Bo Hagan (1st season)
- Home stadium: Rice Stadium

1967 Southwest Conference football standings
	Conf.					Overall
Team	W		L		T	W		L		T
Texas A&M $	6	–	1	–	0	7	–	4	–	0
Texas Tech	5	–	2	–	0	6	–	4	–	0
Texas	4	–	3	–	0	6	–	4	–	0
TCU	4	–	3	–	0	4	–	6	–	0
Arkansas	3	–	3	–	1	4	–	5	–	1
SMU	3	–	4	–	0	3	–	7	–	0
Rice	2	–	5	–	0	4	–	6	–	0
Baylor	0	–	6	–	1	1	–	8	–	1
$ – Conference champion

The 1967 Rice Owls football team represented Rice University in the Southwest Conference (SWC) during the 1967 NCAA University Division football season. In its first season under head coach Bo Hagan, the team compiled a 4–6 record (2–5 against SWC opponents), finished seventh in the conference, and was outscored by a total of 175 to 164. The team played its home games at Rice Stadium in Houston.

The team's statistical leaders included Robert Hailey with 1,437 passing yards, Terry Shelton with 651 rushing yards, Larry Davis with 708 receiving yards, and Lester Lehman and Terry Shelton with 30 points each. Three Rice players were selected by the Associated Press (AP) as first-team players on the 1967 All-Southwest Conference football team: offensive tackle Leland Winston; defensive end Jay Collins; and defensive halfback Hugo Hollas.

== Schedule ==
Date	Opponent	Site	Result	Attendance	Source
September 23	at LSU*	Tiger Stadium; Baton Rouge, LA	L 14–20	66,000	
September 30	Navy*	Rice Stadium; Houston, TX	W 21–7	31,000	
October 14	Northwestern*	Rice Stadium; Houston, TX	W 50–6	23,000	
October 21	SMU	Rice Stadium; Houston, TX (rivalry)	W 14–10	42,000	
October 28	at Texas	Memorial Stadium; Austin, TX (rivalry)	L 6–28	66,000	
November 4	at Texas Tech	Jones Stadium; Lubbock, TX	L 10–24	45,150	
November 11	Arkansas	Rice Stadium; Houston, TX	L 9–23	34,000	
November 18	Texas A&M	Rice Stadium; Houston, TX	L 3–18	58,000	
November 25	at TCU	Amon G. Carter Stadium; Fort Worth, TX	L 10–14	16,674	
December 2	Baylor	Rice Stadium; Houston, TX	W 27–25	18,000	
*Non-conference game
