= 1967 Arkansas Razorbacks football team =

American college football season

1967 Arkansas Razorbacks football
- Conference: Southwest Conference
- Record: 4–5–1 (3–3–1 SWC)
- Head coach: Frank Broyles (10th season)
- Offensive scheme: Multiple
- Defensive coordinator: Charlie Coffey (2nd season)
- Base defense: 4–3
- Captains: Hartford Hamilton; Ernest Ruple; Larry Watkins
- Home stadium: Razorback Stadium; War Memorial Stadium

1967 Southwest Conference football standings
	Conf.					Overall
Team	W		L		T	W		L		T
Texas A&M $	6	–	1	–	0	7	–	4	–	0
Texas Tech	5	–	2	–	0	6	–	4	–	0
Texas	4	–	3	–	0	6	–	4	–	0
TCU	4	–	3	–	0	4	–	6	–	0
Arkansas	3	–	3	–	1	4	–	5	–	1
SMU	3	–	4	–	0	3	–	7	–	0
Rice	2	–	5	–	0	4	–	6	–	0
Baylor	0	–	6	–	1	1	–	8	–	1
$ – Conference champion

The 1967 Arkansas Razorbacks football team represented the University of Arkansas in the Southwest Conference (SWC) during the 1967 NCAA University Division football season. In their tenth year under head coach Frank Broyles, the Razorbacks compiled a 4–5–1 record (3–3–1 against SWC opponents), finished in fifth place in the SWC, and outscored all opponents by a combined total of 200 to 149.

== Schedule ==
Date	Opponent	Site	TV	Result	Attendance	Source
September 23	Oklahoma State*	War Memorial Stadium; Little Rock, AR		L 6–7	53,000	
September 30	Tulsa*	Razorback Stadium; Fayetteville, AR		L 12–14	41,000	
October 7	TCU	Razorback Stadium; Fayetteville, AR		W 26–0	40,000	
October 14	at Baylor	Baylor Stadium; Waco, TX		T 10–10	32,000	
October 21	Texas	War Memorial Stadium; Little Rock, AR (rivalry)	ABC	L 12–21	53,000	
October 28	Kansas State*	War Memorial Stadium; Little Rock, AR		W 28–7	40,000	
November 4	Texas A&M	Razorback Stadium; Fayetteville, AR (rivalry)		L 21–33	41,100	
November 11	at Rice	Rice Stadium; Houston, TX		W 23–9	34,000	
November 18	at SMU	Cotton Bowl; Dallas, TX		W 35–17	25,000	
November 25	Texas Tech	War Memorial Stadium; Little Rock, AR (rivalry)		L 27–31	40,000	
*Non-conference game
