= 1970 Texas Longhorns football team =

American college football season

1970 Texas Longhorns football

Coaches Poll national champion NFF co-national champion SWC champion

Cotton Bowl Classic, L 11–24 vs. Notre Dame
- Conference: Southwest Conference

Ranking
- Coaches: No. 1
- AP: No. 3
- Record: 10–1 (7–0 SWC)
- Head coach: Darrell Royal (14th season)
- Offensive coordinator: Emory Bellard
- Offensive scheme: Wishbone
- Defensive coordinator: Mike Campbell
- Base defense: 4–4
- Home stadium: Memorial Stadium

1970 Southwest Conference football standings
	Conf.					Overall
Team	W		L		T	W		L		T
No. 3 Texas $	7	–	0	–	0	10	–	1	–	0
No. 11 Arkansas	6	–	1	–	0	9	–	2	–	0
Texas Tech	5	–	2	–	0	8	–	4	–	0
Rice	3	–	4	–	0	5	–	5	–	0
SMU	3	–	4	–	0	5	–	6	–	0
TCU	3	–	4	–	0	4	–	6	–	1
Baylor	1	–	6	–	0	2	–	9	–	0
Texas A&M	0	–	7	–	0	2	–	9	–	0
$ – Conference champion; Rankings from AP Poll

The 1970 Texas Longhorns football team represented the University of Texas at Austin in the 1970 NCAA University Division football season. The Longhorns shared the national championship with Nebraska, their third national championship overall. Texas had previously won consensus national titles in 1963 and 1969.

Utilizing a wishbone option offense, the defending national champion Longhorns won all ten regular season games to extend their winning streak to thirty games. They were again awarded the UPI (coaches) national title, released prior to the bowl games in early December.

On New Year's Day 1971, Texas had a rematch with Notre Dame in the Cotton Bowl Classic at the Cotton Bowl in Fair Park in Dallas. This time, the sixth-ranked Fighting Irish won 24–11, denying top-ranked Texas a third straight Cotton Bowl victory and consecutive consensus national championship.

Later that day, second-ranked Ohio State lost 27–17 to #12 Stanford in the Rose Bowl. That night, third-ranked Nebraska defeated #5 LSU 17–12 in the Orange Bowl to give the unbeaten Huskers (11–0–1) the post-bowl AP national championship. Through the 1973 season, the final UPI coaches poll was released prior to the bowl games. (In December 1973, UPI champion Alabama also lost their bowl game.)

== Schedule ==
Date	Time	Opponent	Rank	Site	TV	Result	Attendance	Source
September 19	4:00 p.m.	California*	No. 2	Memorial Stadium; Austin, TX		W 56–15	61,000	
September 26	7:30 p.m.	at Texas Tech	No. 2	Jones Stadium; Lubbock, TX (rivalry)		W 35–13	53,124	
October 3	4:00 p.m.	No. 13 UCLA*	No. 2	Memorial Stadium; Austin, TX		W 20–17	65,500	
October 10	3:00 p.m.	vs. Oklahoma*	No. 2	Cotton Bowl; Dallas, TX (rivalry)	ABC	W 41–9	71,938	
October 24	7:30 p.m.	at Rice	No. 2	Rice Stadium; Houston, TX (rivalry)		W 45–21	70,500	
October 31	2:00 p.m.	SMU	No. 1	Memorial Stadium; Austin, TX		W 42–15	61,170	
November 7	2:00 p.m.	at Baylor	No. 1	Baylor Stadium; Waco, TX (rivalry)		W 21–14	35,000	
November 14	2:00 p.m.	at TCU	No. 2	Amon G. Carter Stadium; Fort Worth, TX (rivalry)		W 58–0	40,179	
November 26	2:00 p.m.	Texas A&M	No. 1	Memorial Stadium; Austin, TX (rivalry)		W 52–14	66,400	
December 5	2:00 p.m.	No. 4 Arkansas	No. 1	Memorial Stadium; Austin, TX (rivalry)	ABC	W 42–7	68,510	
January 1, 1971	1:00 p.m.	vs. No. 6 Notre Dame*	No. 1	Cotton Bowl; Dallas, TX (Cotton Bowl Classic)	CBS	L 11–24	73,000	
*Non-conference game; Rankings from AP Poll released prior to the game; All times are in Central time

== Rankings ==
Ranking movements Legend: ██ Increase in ranking ██ Decrease in ranking
	Week														
Poll	Pre	1	2	3	4	5	6	7	8	9	10	11	12	13	Final
AP	2	2	2	2	2	2	2	1	1	2	1	1	1	1	3
UPI Coaches	Not released		1	2	2	2	2	2	1	1	1	1	1	1	Not released

== Game summaries ==
=== Vs. California ===
California Golden Bears (0–1) vs. Texas Longhorns (0–0)

Quarter	1	2	3	4	Total
California	0	0	0	15	15
No. 2 Texas	21	7	14	14	56

at Memorial Stadium • Austin, TX

- Date: Saturday, September 19, 1970
- Game time: 4:00 PM CDT
- Game weather: Chance of Rain, 89 °F (32 °C)
- Game attendance: 61,000
- Box Score

Game information

First Quarter

- (10:51) UT – Steve Worster 2 yard run (Feller kick), UT 7–0; 7 plays, 64 yards, 2:48
- (9:20) UT – Steve Worster 11 yard run (Feller kick), UT 14–0; 4 plays, 23 yards, 1:27
- (3:50) UT – Steve Worster 9 yard run (Feller kick), UT 21–0; 9 plays, 58 yards, 3:14

Second Quarter

- (8:54) UT – Eddie Phillips 10 yard run (Feller kick), UT 28–0; 5 plays, 27 yards, 1:27

Third Quarter

- (11:37) UT – Eddie Phillips 7 yard run (Feller kick), UT 35–0; 4 plays, 80 yards, 3:23
- (7:42) UT – Steve Fleming 2 yard run (Feller kick), UT 42–0; 7 plays, 73 yards, 2:04

Fourth Quarter

- (10:48) UT – Donnie Wigginton 14 yard run (Feller kick), UT 49–0; 10 plays, 81 yards, 3:22
- (8:16) CAL – Isaac Curtis 20 yard pass from Steve Curtis (Wearsching kick), UT 49–7; 5 plays, 70 yards, 2:21
- (7:08) UT – Gary Keithley 25 yard run (Feller kick), UT 56–7; 4 plays, 55 yards, 1:08
- (2:20) CAL – Tim Todd 2 yard run (Todd pass from Steve Curtis), UT 56–15; 12 plays, 80 yards, 4:50

Statistics	CAL	TEX
First downs	21	29
Total yards	356	556
Rushes/yards	41/116	62/443
Passing yards	240	113
Passing: Comp–Att–Int	16–30–3	7–18–0
Time of possession		

Team	Category	Player	Statistics
California	Passing	TEAM	16–30, 240 yards, 1 TD, 3 INTs
California	Rushing	TEAM	41 car, 116 yards, 1 TD
California	Receiving	TEAM	16 rec, 240 yards, 1 TD
Texas	Passing	Eddie Phillips	3–10, 44 yards
Texas	Rushing	Eddie Phillips	9 car, 129 yards, 2 TDs
Texas	Receiving	Dan Steakley	2 rec, 43 yards

=== At Texas Tech ===
Texas Longhorns (1–0) vs. Texas Tech Red Raiders (1–1)

Quarter	1	2	3	4	Total
No. 2 Texas	14	0	7	14	35
Texas Tech	0	13	0	0	13

at Jones Stadium • Lubbock, TX

- Date: Saturday, September 26, 1970
- Game time: 7:30 PM CDT
- Game attendance: 50,000
- Box Score

Game information

First Quarter

- (4:07) UT – Eddie Phillips 17 yard run (Feller kick), UT 7–0; 2 plays, 22 yards, 0:42
- (1:07) UT – Steve Worster 3 yard run (Feller kick), UT 14–0; 4 plays, 42 yards, 1:26

Second Quarter

- (12:59) TTU – Napper 1 yard run (Ingram kick), UT 14–7; 9 plays, 72 yards, 3:01
- (5:48) TTU – McCutchen 10 yard run (Ingram kick failed), UT 14–13; 3 plays, 58 yards, 1:13

Third Quarter

- (9:23) UT – Jim Bertelsen 4 yard run (Feller kick), UT 21–13; 15 plays, 72 yards, 4:28

Fourth Quarter

- (10:42) UT – Billy Dale 9 yard run (Feller kick), UT 28–13; 10 plays, 79 yards, 4:07
- (2:05) UT – Jim Bertelsen 4 yard run (Feller kick), UT 35–13; 14 plays, 71 yards, 4:46

Statistics	TEX	TTU
First downs	29	13
Total yards	522	241
Rushes/yards	76/432	49/190
Passing yards	90	51
Passing: Comp–Att–Int	6–15–2	4–14–1
Time of possession		

Team	Category	Player	Statistics
Texas	Passing	Eddie Phillips	6–15, 90 yards, 2 INTs
Texas	Rushing	Eddie Phillips	18 car, 127 yards, 1 TD
Texas	Receiving	Charles Spreyer	3 rec, 56 yards
Texas Tech	Passing	TEAM	4–14, 51 yards, 1 INT
Texas Tech	Rushing	TEAM	49 car, 190 yards, 2 TDs
Texas Tech	Receiving	TEAM	4 rec, 51 yards

=== Vs. UCLA ===
UCLA Bruins (3–0) vs. Texas Longhorns (2–0)

Quarter	1	2	3	4	Total
No. 13 UCLA	3	0	14	0	17
No. 2 Texas	0	13	0	7	20

at Memorial Stadium • Austin, TX

- Date: Saturday, October 3, 1970
- Game time: 4:00 PM CDT
- Game weather: 87 °F (31 °C)
- Game attendance: 65,500
- Box Score

Game information
- (10:53) UCLA – Bruce Barnes 19 yard field goal, UCLA 3–0; 7 plays, 27 yards, 3:45

Second Quarter

- (8:12) UT – Jim Bertelsen 3 yard run (Feller kick), UT 7–3; 9 plays, 80 yards, 2:58
- (3:16) UT – Happy Feller 55 yard field goal, UT 10–3; 7 plays, 50 yards, 2:25
- (0:12) UT – Happy Feller 48 yard field goal, UT 13–3; 8 plays, 48 yards, 1:08

Third Quarter

- (11:30) UCLA – Vernoy 11 yard pass from Dennis Dummit (Barnes kick), UT 13–10; 10 plays, 89 yards, 3:26
- (3:36) UCLA – Bob Christiansen 11 yard pass from Dennis Dummit (Barnes kick), UCLA 17–13; 9 plays, 93 yards, 3:35

Fourth Quarter

- (0:12) UT – Charles Speyrer 45 yard pass from Eddie Phillips (Feller kick), UT 20–17; 6 plays, 51 yards, 0:46

Statistics	UCLA	TEX
First downs	21	23
Total yards	407	337
Rushes/yards	40/67	65/235
Passing yards	340	102
Passing: Comp–Att–Int	19–30–1	6–15–0
Time of possession		

Team	Category	Player	Statistics
UCLA	Passing	TEAM	19–30, 340 yards, 2 TDs, 1 INT
UCLA	Rushing	TEAM	40 car, 67 yards
UCLA	Receiving	TEAM	19 rec, 340 yards, 2 TDs
Texas	Passing	Eddie Phillips	6–15, 102 yards, 1 TD
Texas	Rushing	Steve Worster	19 car, 106 yards
Texas	Receiving	Charles Spreyer	4 rec, 77 yards, 1 TD

=== Vs. Oklahoma ===
Texas Longhorns (3–0) vs. Oklahoma Sooners (2–1)

Quarter	1	2	3	4	Total
No. 2 Texas	0	14	13	14	41
Oklahoma	0	3	0	6	9

at Cotton Bowl • Dallas, TX

- Date: Saturday, October 10, 1970
- Game time: 3:00 PM CDT
- Game weather: Clear, 67 °F (19 °C)
- Game attendance: 71,938
- TV announcers (ABC): Chris Schenkel, Bud Wilkinson
- Box Score

Game information

Second Quarter

- (10:42) OU – Derr 51 yard field goal, OU 3–0; 7 plays, 81 yards
- (4:38) UT – Jim Bertelsen 9 yard run (Feller kick), UT 7–3; 6 plays, 22 yards
- (0:19) UT – Deryl Comer 7 yard pass from Eddie Phillips (Feller kick), UT 14–3; 7 plays, 52 yards

Third Quarter

- (12:53) UT – Eddie Phillips 10 yard run (Feller kick failed), UT 20–3; 5 plays, 21 yards
- (7:12) UT – Terry Collins 13 yard run (Feller kick), UT 27–3; 1 play, 13 yards

Fourth Quarter

- (14:36) UT – Steve Worster 3 yard run (Feller kick), UT 34–3; 11 plays, 58 yards
- (3:01) OU – Leon Crosswhite 1 yard run (Pruitt pass failed), UT 34–9; 12 plays, 56 yards
- (0:31) UT – Steve Fleming 2 yard run (Feller kick), UT 41–9; 3 plays, 7 yards

Statistics	TEX	OU
First downs	18	16
Total yards	335	222
Rushes/yards	66/310	63/212
Passing yards	25	10
Passing: Comp–Att–Int	3–7–0	3–11–2
Time of possession		

Team	Category	Player	Statistics
Texas	Passing	Eddie Phillips	3–6, 25 yards, 1 TD
Texas	Rushing	Steve Worster	17 car, 81 yards, 1 TD
Texas	Receiving	Charles Spreyer	1 rec, 10 yards
Oklahoma	Passing	TEAM	3–11, 10 yards, 2 INTs
Oklahoma	Rushing	TEAM	63 car, 218 yards, 1 TD
Oklahoma	Receiving	TEAM	3 rec, 10 yards

=== At Rice ===
Texas Longhorns (4–0) vs. Rice Owls (2–2)

Quarter	1	2	3	4	Total
No. 2 Texas	3	7	21	14	45
Rice	7	0	0	14	21

at Rice Stadium • Houston, TX

- Date: Saturday, October 24, 1970
- Game time: 7:30 PM CDT
- Game weather: Clear, 62 °F (17 °C)
- Game attendance: 70,500
- Box Score

Game information

First Quarter

- (8:36) UT – Happy Feller 33 yard field goal, UT 3–0; 14 plays, 57 yards, 7:18
- (8:23) RICE – Hughes 91 yard kickoff return (Williams kick), RICE 7–3

Second Quarter

- (8:08) UT – Eddie Phillips 5 yard run (Feller kick), UT 10–7; 3 plays, 14 yards, 1:18

Third Quarter

- (11:48) UT – Eddie Phillips 7 yard run (Feller kick), UT 17–7; 3 plays, 37 yards, 1:01
- (6:07) UT – Eddie Phillips 10 yard run (Feller kick), UT 24–7; 4 plays, 22 yards
- (1:28) UT – Steve Worster 1 yard run (Feller kick), UT 31–7; 11 plays, 62 yards, 4:05

Fourth Quarter

- (10:57) RICE – Brown 14 yard pass from Woods (Williams kick), UT 31–14; 2 plays, 16 yards, 0:42
- (3:31) UT – Paul Robichau 7 yard run (Feller kick), UT 38–14; 17 plays, 87 yards, 7:26
- (1:16) RICE – Nacarrato 39 yard blocked punt return (Williams kick), UT 38–21
- (0:05) UT – Donnie Wigginton 4 yard run (Feller kick), UT 45–21; 6 plays, 51 yards, 1:03

Statistics	TEX	RICE
First downs	31	10
Total yards	562	130
Rushes/yards	85/500	34/52
Passing yards	62	78
Passing: Comp–Att–Int	4–10–1	7–14–1
Time of possession		

Team	Category	Player	Statistics
Texas	Passing	Eddie Phillips	2–5, 30 yards
Texas	Rushing	Steve Worster	23 car, 170 yards, 1 TD
Texas	Receiving	Deryl Comer	3 rec, 38 yards
Rice	Passing	TEAM	7–14, 78 yards, 1 TD, 1 INT
Rice	Rushing	TEAM	34 car, 52 yards
Rice	Receiving	TEAM	7 rec, 78 yards, 1 TD

=== Vs. SMU ===
SMU Mustangs (3–3) vs. Texas Longhorns (5–0)

Quarter	1	2	3	4	Total
SMU	7	0	8	0	15
No. 1 Texas	14	14	0	14	42

at Memorial Stadium • Austin, TX

- Date: Saturday, October 31, 1970
- Game time: 2:00 PM CDT
- Game attendance: 61,170
- Box Score

Game information

First Quarter

- (8:47) UT – Jim Bertelson 72 yard run (Feller kick), UT 7–0; 3 plays, 79 yards
- (3:49) SMU – Scott 45 yard pass from Chuck Hixson (Johnson kick), Tied 7–7; 1 play, 45 yards
- (1:47) UT – Steve Worster 1 yard run (Feller kick), UT 14–7; 6 plays, 49 yards

Second Quarter

- (7:28) UT – Steve Worster 3 yard run (Feller kick), UT 21–7; 9 plays, 64 yards
- (2:27) UT – Steve Worster 5 yard run (Feller kick), UT 28–7; 10 plays, 80 yards

Third Quarter

- (6:09) SMU – Dossett 13 yard pass from Chuck Hixson (Gary Carter pass from Hixson), UT 28–15; 9 plays, 80 yards

Fourth Quarter

- (13:57) UT – Steve Worster 3 yard run (Feller kick), UT 35–15; 14 plays, 81 yards
- (7:13) UT – Jim Bertelson 1 yard run (Feller kick), UT 42–15; 8 plays, 63 yards

Statistics	SMU	TEX
First downs	22	27
Total yards	456	532
Rushes/yards	28/44	70/430
Passing yards	412	102
Passing: Comp–Att–Int	32–49–2	6–9–1
Time of possession		

Team	Category	Player	Statistics
SMU	Passing	TEAM	32–49, 412 yards, 2 TDs, 2 INTs
SMU	Rushing	TEAM	28 car, 44 yards
SMU	Receiving	TEAM	32 rec, 412 yards, 2 TDs
Texas	Passing	Eddie Phillips	5–5, 87 yards
Texas	Rushing	Steve Worster	25 car, 144 yards, 4 TDs
Texas	Receiving	Danny Lester	5 rec, 87 yards

=== At Baylor ===
Texas Longhorns (6–0) vs. Baylor Bears (2–5)

Quarter	1	2	3	4	Total
No. 1 Texas	0	21	0	0	21
Baylor	0	7	0	7	14

at Baylor Stadium • Waco, TX

- Date: Saturday, November 7, 1970
- Game time: 2:00 PM CDT
- Game weather: Partly Cloudy, 78 °F (26 °C)
- Game attendance: 35,000
- Box Score

Game information

Second Quarter

- (14:59) UT – Steve Worster 1 yard run (Feller kick), UT 7–0; 3 plays, 15 yards, 0:37
- (14:00) BAY – Davis 50 yard pass from Southall (Conradt kick), Tied 7–7; 3 plays, 75 yards, 0:59
- (9:57) UT – Eddie Phillips 5 yard run (Feller kick), UT 14–7; 11 plays, 77 yards, 4:03
- (2:06) UT – Steve Worster 1 yard run (Feller kick), UT 21–7; 14 plays, 78 yards, 6:45

Fourth Quarter

- (8:21) BAY – Penn 27 yard blocked punt return (Conradt kick), UT 21–14

Statistics	TEX	BAY
First downs	17	15
Total yards	309	262
Rushes/yards	66/244	50/148
Passing yards	65	114
Passing: Comp–Att–Int	3–9–0	6–18–1
Time of possession		

Team	Category	Player	Statistics
Texas	Passing	Eddie Phillips	3–9, 65 yards
Texas	Rushing	Steve Worster	23 car, 97 yards, 2 TDs
Texas	Receiving	Danny Lester	2 rec, 53 yards
Baylor	Passing	TEAM	6–18, 114 yards, 1 TD, 1 INT
Baylor	Rushing	TEAM	50 car, 148 yards
Baylor	Receiving	TEAM	6 rec, 114 yards, 1 TD

=== At TCU ===
Texas Longhorns (7–0) vs. TCU Horned Frogs (3–4)

Quarter	1	2	3	4	Total
No. 2 Texas	20	7	17	14	58
TCU	0	0	0	0	0

at Amon G. Carter Stadium • Fort Worth, TX

- Date: Saturday, November 14, 1970
- Game time: 2:00 PM CDT
- Game weather: 48 °F (9 °C)
- Game attendance: 40,179
- Box Score

Game information

First Quarter

- (13:58) UT – Jim Bertelsen 54 yard run (Feller kick), UT 7–0; 3 plays, 79 yards, 0:56
- (6:58) UT – Jim Bertelsen 3 yard run (Feller kick), UT 14–0; 11 plays, 70 yards, 3:57
- (3:11) UT – Eddie Phillips 3 yard run (Feller kick blocked), UT 20–0; 7 plays, 25 yards, 2:45

Second Quarter

- (1:03) UT – Eddie Phillips 9 yard run (Feller kick), UT 27–0; 8 plays, 52 yards, 2:18

Third Quarter

- (7:22) UT – Happy Feller 27 yard field goal, UT 30–0; 7 plays, 25 yards, 2:56
- (1:27) UT – Jim Bertelsen 3 yard run (Feller kick), UT 37–0; 7 plays, 31 yards, 4:28
- (1:12) UT – Paul Robichau 6 yard run (Feller kick), UT 44–0; 1 play, 6 yards, 0:07

Fourth Quarter

- (5:10) UT – Paul Campbell 29 yard pass from Donnie Wigginton (Feller kick), UT 51–0; 9 plays, 90 yards, 3:18
- (2:01) UT – Mike Bayer 80 yard interception return (Feller kick), UT 58–0

Statistics	TEX	TCU
First downs	20	13
Total yards	408	220
Rushes/yards	61/301	47/140
Passing yards	107	80
Passing: Comp–Att–Int	7–16–0	9–24–2
Time of possession		

Team	Category	Player	Statistics
Texas	Passing	Eddie Phillips	4–12, 58 yards
Texas	Rushing	Jim Bertelsen	14 car, 92 yards, 3 TDs
Texas	Receiving	Danny Lester	4 rec, 58 yards
TCU	Passing	TEAM	9–24, 80 yards, 2 INTs
TCU	Rushing	TEAM	47 car, 140 yards
TCU	Receiving	TEAM	9 rec, 80 yards

=== Vs. Texas A&M ===
Texas A&M Aggies (2–8) vs. Texas Longhorns (8–0)

Quarter	1	2	3	4	Total
Texas A&M	0	0	0	14	14
No. 1 Texas	21	7	17	7	52

at Memorial Stadium • Austin, TX

- Date: Thursday, November 26, 1970
- Game time: 2:00 PM CDT
- Game weather: Windy, 73 °F (23 °C)
- Game attendance: 66,400
- Box Score

Game information

First Quarter

- (7:08) UT – Eddie Phillips 3 yard run (Feller kick), UT 7–0; 14 plays, 61 yards, 5:21
- (5:43) UT – Jim Bertelsen 4 yard run (Feller kick), UT 14–0; 2 plays, 40 yards, 7:23
- (1:09) UT – Danny Lester 18 yard pass from Eddie Phillips (Feller kick), UT 21–0; 6 plays, 71 yards, 2:28

Second Quarter

- (9:13) UT – Danny Lester 10 yard pass from Eddie Phillips (Feller kick), UT 28–0; 6 plays, 80 yards, 2:23

Third Quarter

- (9:17) UT – Happy Feller 33 yard field goal, UT 31–0; 7 plays, 30 yards, 2:39
- (6:10) UT – Donnie Wigginton 8 yard run (Feller kick), UT 38–0; 5 plays, 62 yards, 1:47
- (1:08) UT – Donnie Wigginton 7 yard run (Feller kick), UT 45–0; 7 plays, 94 yards, 2:14

Fourth Quarter

- (12:28) UT – Paul Robichau 1 yard run (Feller kick), UT 52–0; 8 plays, 22 yards, 3:01
- (4:01) A&M – Lex James 8 yard run (May pass from James), UT 52–8; 5 plays, 21 yards, 2:06
- (0:48) A&M – Herr 9 yard pass from Lex James (James pass failed), UT 52–14; 5 plays, 62 yards, 1:12

Statistics	TAMU	TEX
First downs	15	27
Total yards	358	603
Rushes/yards	43/186	74/386
Passing yards	172	217
Passing: Comp–Att–Int	10–22–1	8–21–2
Time of possession		

Team	Category	Player	Statistics
Texas A&M	Passing	TEAM	10–22, 172 yards, 1 TD, 1 INT
Texas A&M	Rushing	TEAM	43 car, 186 yards, 1 TD
Texas A&M	Receiving	TEAM	10 rec, 172 yards, 1 TD
Texas	Passing	Eddie Phillips	5–16, 148 yards, 2 TDs, 1 INT
Texas	Rushing	Steve Fleming	8 car, 84 yards
Texas	Receiving	Danny Lester	5 rec, 148 yards, 2 TDs

=== Vs. Arkansas ===
Arkansas Razorbacks (9–1) vs. Texas Longhorns (9–0)

Quarter	1	2	3	4	Total
No. 4 Arkansas	0	7	0	0	7
No. 1 Texas	7	14	7	14	42

at Memorial Stadium • Austin, TX

- Date: Saturday, December 5, 1970
- Game time: 2:00 PM CDT
- Game weather: Coldfront Expected, 74 °F (23 °C)
- Game attendance: 68,510
- TV announcers (ABC): Chris Schenkel, Bud Wilkinson
- Box Score

Game information

First Quarter

- (10:57) UT – Eddie Phillips 3 yard run (Feller kick), UT 7–0; 10 plays, 76 yards, 4:03

Second Quarter

- (14:24) UT – Steve Worster 2 yard run (Feller kick), UT 14–0; 14 plays, 83 yards, 5:31
- (12:41) ARK – Richardson 12 yard run (McClard kick), UT 14–7; 4 plays, 80 yards, 1:43
- (2:20) UT – Jim Bertelsen 2 yard run (Feller kick), UT 21–7; 15 plays, 99 yards, 6:05

Third Quarter

- (9:26) UT – Steve Worster 2 yard run (Feller kick), UT 28–7; 9 plays, 46 yards, 4:08

Fourth Quarter

- (12:58) UT – Jim Bertelsen 8 yard run (Feller kick), UT 35–7; 12 plays, 60 yards, 5:06
- (7:40) UT – Jim Bertelsen 5 yard run (Feller kick), UT 42–7; 8 plays, 48 yards, 3:36

Statistics	ARK	TEX
First downs	13	29
Total yards	165	517
Rushes/yards	24/20	90/464
Passing yards	145	53
Passing: Comp–Att–Int	11–27–3	3–5–0
Time of possession		

Team	Category	Player	Statistics
Arkansas	Passing	TEAM	11–27, 145 yards, 3 INTs
Arkansas	Rushing	TEAM	24 car, 20 yards, 1 TD
Arkansas	Receiving	TEAM	11 rec, 145 yards
Texas	Passing	Eddie Phillips	2–3, 46 yards
Texas	Rushing	Jim Bertelsen	30 car, 189 yards, 3 TDs
Texas	Receiving	Jim Bertelsen	1 rec, 27 yards

=== Vs. Notre Dame (Cotton Bowl) ===
1971 Cotton Bowl Classic: Notre Dame Fighting Irish (9–1) vs. Texas Longhorns (10–0)

Quarter	1	2	3	4	Total
No. 6 Notre Dame	14	10	0	0	24
No. 1 Texas	3	8	0	0	11

at Cotton Bowl • Dallas, TX

- Date: Friday, January 1, 1971
- Game time: 1:00 PM CDT
- Game weather: Clear, 52 °F (11 °C)
- Game attendance: 73,000
- Referee: Gene Calhoun (Big Ten)
- TV announcers (CBS): Lindsey Nelson, Tom Brookshier
- Box Score

Game information

First Quarter

- (15:38) UT – Happy Feller 23 yard field goal, UT 3–0; 5 plays, 67 yards, 1:33
- (7:58) ND – Tom Gatewood 26 yard pass from Joe Theismann (Hempel kick), ND 7–3; 10 plays, 80 yards, 3:39
- (5:11) ND – Joe Theismann 3 yard run (Hempel kick), ND 14–3; 6 plays, 13 yards, 2:42

Second Quarter

- (13:28) ND – Joe Theismann 15 yard run (Hempel kick), ND 21–3; 5 plays, 53 yards, 1:37
- (1:52) UT – Jim Bertelsen 2 yard run (Lester pass from Phillips), ND 21–11; 18 plays, 84 yards, 7:02
- (0:24) ND – Scott Hempel 36 yard field goal, ND 24–11; 8 plays, 78 yards, 1:21

Statistics	ND	TEX
First downs	16	20
Total yards	359	426
Rushes/yards	52/146	55/216
Passing yards	213	240
Passing: Comp–Att–Int	10–19–1	10–27–1
Time of possession		

Team	Category	Player	Statistics
Notre Dame	Passing	Joe Theismann	9–16, 176 yards, 1 TD, 1 INT
Notre Dame	Rushing	Cieszkowski	13 car, 52 yards
Notre Dame	Receiving	Yoder	2 rec, 96 yards
Texas	Passing	Eddie Phillips	9–17, 199 yards
Texas	Rushing	Eddie Phillips	23 car, 164 yards
Texas	Receiving	Deryl Comer	4 rec, 67 yards

== Roster ==
1970 Texas Longhorns football team roster
Players
Coaches
Offense

Pos.	#	Name	Class
C	57	Jim Achilles	Sr
OT		Andy Banks	So
RB	35	Jim Bertelsen	Jr
OB	32	Larry Black	So
OE	84	Jerrell Bolton	So
FB	46	Bobby Callison	Sr
OE	19	Dean Campbell	Jr
OB	33	Terry Collins	Sr
OE	83	Deryl Comer	Sr
OE	31	Jay Cormier	Sr
OB	22	Billy Dale	Sr
G	66	Mike Dean	Sr
FB	24	Steve Fleming	So
OT	62	Bruce Gaw	So
OE		Len Hanson	So
G	58	Bill Harrington	So
OE	86	Stan Hicks	So
OE		Jimmy Hull	Sr
G	60	Syd Keasler	Sr
QB	12	Gary Keithley	So
C	53	Tommy Lee	So
G		Charles Loeffler	So
G		Tony Malouf	Jr
OT		Rick Martin	So
C		George McIngvale	So
G	64	Bobby Mitchell	Sr
G		Jim Morris	So
G	59	Steve Oxley	So
OB		Robert Paine	So
QB	14	Eddie Phillips	Jr
OB	47	Paul Robichau	Sr
OT	69	Charles Rogers	Sr
OE		Jack Rushing	So
C		Rob Schultz	So
OT	76	Jerry Sisemore	So
WR	88	Cotton Speyrer	Sr
OB	20	Dan Steakley	So
G	74	Randy Stout	Jr
OE		Dan Terwelp	So
OT	55	Ronnie Tyler	So
OB		John Ulrich	So
OT		Alan Weddell	So
QB	18	Donnie Wigginton	Jr
OE	82	Tommy Woodard	Jr
OB		Rocky Wooley	So
RB	30	Steve Worster	Sr
OT	50	Bobby Wuensch	Sr
C	51	Jeff Zapalac	So

Defense

Pos.	#	Name	Class
DE	89	David Arledge	Jr
DE	77	Bill Atessis	Sr
DB	36	David Ballew	So
DB	21	Mike Bayer	So
LB	63	Randy Braband	So
DB		Rusty Campbell	So
DB		Bill Catlett	So
LB	42	Richard Chapman	So
LB	37	R. J. Childress	So
DT	71	Ray Dowdy	Jr
DE	56	Jimmy Dreyer	So
LB	39	Darrell Gray	So
DB	13	Jimmy Gunn	Sr
ILB	61	Scott Henderson	Sr
DB		Kevin Hutson	So
DB		David Keeton	So
DT		Cary Kipp	So
CB	23	Danny Lester	Sr
DB	40	Alan Lowry	So
DE		Lee Lyles	So
DT		Pat Macha	So
LB		Kiefer Marshall	So
DT	72	Tommy Matula	So
LB	85	Stan Mauldin	Jr
LB	52	Sam McBrierty	So
LB		Jim McIngvale	So
DB	41	Rick Nabors	Sr
DT	65	Scott Palmer	Sr
DT	31	Greg Ploetz	Sr
LB	34	David Richardson	Sr
DT	73	Travis Roach	Jr
DB	26	Johnnie Robinson	Sr
DB		Mike Rowan	So
DE	87	Bill Rutherford	So
DE		Rod Squires	So
S	28	Freddie Steinmark	Sr
LB	48	Rick Troberman	Jr
LB	43	Larry Webb	Jr
DT	70	Carl White	Jr
DT	67	Julius Whittier	So
LB		Steve Williams	So
DB		Donny Windham	Sr
OLB	80	Bill Zapalac	Jr

Special teams

Pos.	#	Name	Class
K	5	Happy Feller	Sr
K	7	Steve Valek	So

Head coach

- Darrell Royal

Coordinators/assistant coaches

- Emory Bellard – Offensive coordinator
- Fred Akers – Co-offensive coordinator
- Mike Campbell – Defensive coordinator
- Willie Zapalac – Offensive line
- Tim Doerr – Assistant
- Jim Helms – Assistant
- David McWilliams – Defensive end/linebackers
- Pat Patterson – Assistant

Legend

- (C) Team captain
- (S) Suspended
- (I) Ineligible
- Injured
- Redshirt

== Awards and honors ==
- Bobby Wuensch, tackle, Consensus All-American
- Steve Worster, back, Consensus All-American
- Bill Atessis, defensive end, Consensus All-American

== NFL draft ==
Nine seniors from the 1970 Longhorns were selected in the 1971 NFL draft:

Player	Position	Round	Pick	Franchise
Cotton Speyrer	WR	2	38	Washington Redskins
Bill Atessis	DE	2	52	Baltimore Colts
Happy Feller	K	4	83	Philadelphia Eagles
Bill Zapalac	LB	4	84	New York Jets
Steve Worster	RB	4	90	Los Angeles Rams
Scott Palmer	DT	7	162	New York Jets
Bobby Wuensch	T	12	294	Baltimore Colts
Danny Lester	DB	13	317	Philadelphia Eagles
Deryl Comer	TE	14	345	Atlanta Falcons

Two juniors from the 1970 Longhorns were selected in the 1972 NFL draft:

Player	Position	Round	Pick	Franchise
Jim Bertelsen	RB	2	30	Los Angeles Rams
Eddie Phillips	QB	4	95	Los Angeles Rams

One sophomore from the 1970 Longhorns was selected in the 1973 NFL draft:

Player	Position	Round	Pick	Franchise
Jerry Sisemore	OT	1	3	Philadelphia Eagles
