= Bo Hagan =

American football and baseball player

Biographical details
- Born: October 8, 1925; Savannah, Georgia, U.S.
- Died: January 22, 2002 (aged 76); Greenville, South Carolina, U.S.

Playing career

Football
- 1946–1949: South Carolina

Baseball
- 1947: South Carolina
- 1949–1950: South Carolina
- 1952: Jesup Bees
- Positions: Quarterback (football); Pitcher (baseball)

Coaching career (HC unless noted)

Football
- 1950: Bass HS (GA)
- 1951: Georgia Tech (asst. freshmen)
- 1952–1953: Georgia Tech (freshmen)
- 1954–1955: SMU (backfield)
- 1956–1966: Rice (backfield)
- 1967–1970: Rice

Administrative career (AD unless noted)
- 1967–1970: Rice
- 1971–1974: South Carolina (admin. asst.)
- 1974–1976: South Carolina

Head coaching record
- Overall: 12–27–1

Harold Benjamin "Bo" Hagan (October 8, 1925 – January 22, 2002) was an American football and baseball player, football coach, and college athletics administrator. He served as head football coach at Rice University from 1967 from 1970, compiling a record of 12–27–1. Before serving as head coach, Hagan was the backfield coach at Rice for 11 seasons. Hagan was the athletic director at the University of South Carolina from 1975 to 1976.

== Playing ==
Hagan helped lead Savannah High School to a state championship in 1942 and was named an all-state halfback in 1943.

During World War II, Hagan was a combat infantryman in the 97th Infantry Division. He saw action in the Rhineland campaign and the Western Allied invasion of Germany and earned two Bronze Stars.

Hagan entered the University of South Carolina in 1946 and won four letters each in football and baseball. He was named to the 1946 All-Southern Conference football team by the Associated Press (third team) and United Press (second team). Knee injuries hampered Hagan for most of his time at USC and were expected to keep him out of the 1949 Big Thursday game against rival Clemson. However, after backup John Boyle threw two interceptions, Hagan entered the game with the Gamecocks down 13–0. Hagan ran for two touchdowns and passed for a third to lead South Carolina to a 27–13 victory.

Hagan played one season (1952) of professional baseball with the Jesup Bees of the Georgia State League.

== Coaching ==
In 1950, Hagan was an assistant coach at Atlanta's Bass High School. In 1951, he was named head coach at O'Keefe High School. However, before coaching a game, he joined the coaching staff at Georgia Tech as an assistant freshman coach. In 1952, he was promoted to head freshman coach. He moved to Southern Methodist University in 1954, where he worked for two seasons as backfield coach with Woody Woodard. In 1956, Jess Neely hired Hagan as his backfield coach at Rice University. He assisted Neely for 11 seasons before succeeding him as head coach after the 1966 campaign. On November 10, 1970, with Rice sitting at a 2–5 record and three games remaining in the season, Hagan announced that he would resign at the end of the season.

== Administration ==
Hagan served as Rice's athletic director from 1966 to 1970. In 1971, he returned to South Carolina as an administrative assistant to athletic director Paul Dietzel. He was promoted to athletic director in 1974 following Dietzel's dismissal. In 1976, Hagan was reassigned by the university and head football coach Jim Carlen replaced him as AD. He was South Carolina's director of alumni and development until his retirement in 1988.

== Later life ==
Hagan retired to Greenville, South Carolina. In 1994, he was diagnosed with lymphoma. He died on January 22, 2002 at his home in Greenville.

== Head coaching record ==
| Year | Team | Overall | Conference | Standing | Bowl/playoffs |
|---|---|---|---|---|---|
Rice Owls (Southwest Conference) (1967–1970)
| 1967 | Rice | 4–6 | 2–5 | 7th | |
| 1968 | Rice | 0–9–1 | 0–7 | 8th | |
| 1969 | Rice | 3–7 | 2–5 | T–6th | |
| 1970 | Rice | 5–5 | 3–4 | T–4th | |
| Rice: | | 12–27–1 | 7–21 | | |
| Total: | | 12–27–1 | | | |
