= Fred Taylor (American football coach) =

American football player and coach (1920–2013)

Biographical details
- Born: April 30, 1920; Gunter, Texas, U.S.
- Died: July 21, 2013 (aged 93); Granbury, Texas, U.S.

Playing career
- 1940–1941: TCU
- 1945–1946: TCU
- Position: End

Coaching career (HC unless noted)
- 1948–1950: Lubbock HS (TX) (assistant)
- 1951: Miller HS (TX) (assistant)
- 1952: Victoria HS (TX)
- 1953–1966: TCU (assistant)
- 1967–1970: TCU

Head coaching record
- Overall: 15–25–1 (college)

Fred Alvin Taylor (April 30, 1920 – July 21, 2013) was an American football player and coach. He served as head coach at Texas Christian University from 1967 to 1970, compiling a record of 15–25–1 before he was fired following the 1970 season.

== Early life and playing career ==
Taylor was native of Denison, Texas. He played college football at Texas Christian University in 1940 and 1941 before entering the United States Army to serve during World War II. Taylor returned to TCU after the war and served as the football team's captain in 1946.

== Death ==
Taylor died on July 21, 2013.

== Head coaching record ==
=== College ===
Year	Team	Overall	Conference	Standing	Bowl/playoffs
TCU Horned Frogs (Southwest Conference) (1967–1970)
1967	TCU	4–6	4–3	T–3rd	
1968	TCU	3–7	2–5	T–6th	
1969	TCU	4–6	4–3	T–3rd	
1970	TCU	4–6–1	3–4	T–4th	
TCU:		15–25–1	13–15		
Total:		15–25–1			
