= 1967 Texas Tech Red Raiders football team =

American college football season

1967 Texas Tech Red Raiders football
- Conference: Southwest Conference
- Record: 6–4 (5–2 SWC)
- Head coach: J. T. King (7th season)
- Offensive scheme: T formation
- Base defense: 4–3
- Home stadium: Jones Stadium

1967 Southwest Conference football standings
	Conf.					Overall
Team	W		L		T	W		L		T
Texas A&M $	6	–	1	–	0	7	–	4	–	0
Texas Tech	5	–	2	–	0	6	–	4	–	0
Texas	4	–	3	–	0	6	–	4	–	0
TCU	4	–	3	–	0	4	–	6	–	0
Arkansas	3	–	3	–	1	4	–	5	–	1
SMU	3	–	4	–	0	3	–	7	–	0
Rice	2	–	5	–	0	4	–	6	–	0
Baylor	0	–	6	–	1	1	–	8	–	1
$ – Conference champion

The 1967 Texas Tech Red Raiders football team represented Texas Technological College—now known as Texas Tech University—as a member of the Southwest Conference (SWC) during the 1967 NCAA University Division football season. In their seventh season under head coach J. T. King, the Red Raiders compiled a 6–4 record (5–2 against conference opponents), finished in second place in the SWC, and outscored opponents by a combined total of 217 to 165. The team's statistical leaders included Joe Matulich with 507 passing yards, Mike Leinert with 689 rushing yards, and Larry Gilbert with 491 receiving yards. The team played its home games at Clifford B. & Audrey Jones Stadium.

== Schedule ==
Date	Opponent	Rank	Site	Result	Attendance	Source
September 23	Iowa State*		Jones Stadium; Lubbock, TX	W 52–0	30,328	
September 28	at No. 8 Texas		Memorial Stadium; Austin, TX (rivalry)	W 19–13	66,000	
October 7	Mississippi State*	No. 10	Jones Stadium; Lubbock, TX	L 3–7	39,000	
October 14	Texas A&M		Jones Stadium; Lubbock, TX (rivalry)	L 24–28	48,240	
October 21	at Florida State*		Doak Campbell Stadium; Tallahassee, FL	L 12–28	33,179	
October 28	at SMU		Cotton Bowl; Dallas, TX	W 21–7	34,000	
November 4	Rice^{†}		Jones Stadium; Lubbock, TX	W 24–10	45,150	
November 11	at TCU		Amon G. Carter Stadium; Fort Worth, TX (rivalry)	L 0–16	23,428	
November 18	Baylor		Jones Stadium; Lubbock, TX (rivalry)	W 31–29	34,000	
November 25	at Arkansas		War Memorial Stadium; Little Rock, AR (rivalry)	W 31–27	40,000	
*Non-conference game; ^{†}Homecoming; Rankings from AP Poll released prior to the game
