= 1967 TCU Horned Frogs football team =

American college football season

1967 TCU Horned Frogs football
- Conference: Southwest Conference
- Record: 4–6 (4–3 SWC)
- Head coach: Fred Taylor (1st season)
- Offensive scheme: TCU spread
- Home stadium: Amon G. Carter Stadium

1967 Southwest Conference football standings
	Conf.					Overall
Team	W		L		T	W		L		T
Texas A&M $	6	–	1	–	0	7	–	4	–	0
Texas Tech	5	–	2	–	0	6	–	4	–	0
Texas	4	–	3	–	0	6	–	4	–	0
TCU	4	–	3	–	0	4	–	6	–	0
Arkansas	3	–	3	–	1	4	–	5	–	1
SMU	3	–	4	–	0	3	–	7	–	0
Rice	2	–	5	–	0	4	–	6	–	0
Baylor	0	–	6	–	1	1	–	8	–	1
$ – Conference champion

The 1967 TCU Horned Frogs football team represented Texas Christian University (TCU) in the 1967 NCAA University Division football season. The Horned Frogs finished the season 4–6 overall and 4–3 in the Southwest Conference. The team was coached by Fred Taylor in his first year as head coach. The Frogs played their home games in Amon G. Carter Stadium, which is located on campus in Fort Worth, Texas.

== Schedule ==
Date	Opponent	Site	Result	Attendance	Source
September 23	at Iowa*	Iowa Stadium; Iowa City, IA	L 9–24	46,731	
September 30	at Georgia Tech*	Grant Field; Atlanta, GA	L 7–24	55,299	
October 7	at Arkansas	Razorback Stadium; Fayetteville, AR	L 0–26	40,000	
October 21	Texas A&M	Amon G. Carter Stadium; Fort Worth, TX (rivalry)	L 0–20	37,166	
October 28	Nebraska*	Amon G. Carter Stadium; Fort Worth, TX	L 0–29	18,529	
November 4	at Baylor	Baylor Stadium; Waco, TX (rivalry)	W 29–7	25,000	
November 11	Texas Tech	Amon G. Carter Stadium; Fort Worth, TX (rivalry)	W 16–0	23,428	
November 18	at Texas	Texas Memorial Stadium; Austin, TX (rivalry)	W 24–17	51,000	
November 25	Rice	Amon G. Carter Stadium; Fort Worth, TX	W 14–10	16,674	
December 2	at SMU	Cotton Bowl; Dallas, TX (rivalry)	L 14–28	17,000	
*Non-conference game
