= 1967 All-Southwest Conference football team =

American college football all-star team

The 1967 All-Southwest Conference football team is composed of select American football players who were chosen by a variety of organizations to form the All-Southwest Conference teams for the 1967 NCAA University Division football season. Among the selectors for the 1967 season was the Associated Press (AP).

== All Southwest selections ==
=== Offense ===
==== Quarterbacks ====
- Edd Hargett, Texas A&M (AP-1)

==== Halfbacks ====
- Chris Gilbert, Texas (AP-1) (CFHOF)
- Mike Leinert, Texas Tech (AP-1)
- Larry Stegent, Texas A&M (AP-1)

==== Fullbacks ====
- Ross Montgomery, TCU (AP-1)

==== Ends ====
- Jerry LeVias, SMU (AP-1) (CFHOF)
- Bob Long, Texas A&M (AP-1)

==== Tackles ====
- Ernie Ruple, Arkansas (AP-1)
- Leland Winston, Rice (AP-1)

==== Guards ====
- Danny Abbott, Texas (AP-1)
- Phil Tucker, Texas Tech (AP-1)

==== Centers ====
- Jerry Turner, Texas Tech (AP-1)

=== Defense ===
==== Defensive ends ====
- Grady Allen, Texas A&M (AP-1)
- Jay Collins, Rice (AP-1)
- Hartford Hamilton, Arkansas (AP-1)

==== Defensive tackles ====
- Greg Pipes, Baylor (AP-1)
- Danny Cross, TCU (AP-1)

==== Defensive guards ====
- David Cooper, Arkansas (AP-1)
- Loyd Wainscott, Texas (AP-1)

==== Linebackers ====
- Bill Hobbs, Texas A&M (AP-1)
- Ed Mooney, Texas Tech (AP-1)

==== Defensive halfbacks ====
- Tommy Trantham, Arkansas (AP-1)
- Hugo Hollas, Rice (AP-1)

==== Safeties ====
- Bubby Hudler, TCU (AP-1)

== See also ==
- 1967 College Football All-America Team
