= 1970 Rice Owls football team =

American college football season

1970 Rice Owls football
- Conference: Southwest Conference
- Record: 5–5 (3–4 SWC)
- Head coach: Bo Hagan (4th season)
- Home stadium: Rice Stadium

1970 Southwest Conference football standings
	Conf.					Overall
Team	W		L		T	W		L		T
No. 3 Texas $	7	–	0	–	0	10	–	1	–	0
No. 11 Arkansas	6	–	1	–	0	9	–	2	–	0
Texas Tech	5	–	2	–	0	8	–	4	–	0
Rice	3	–	4	–	0	5	–	5	–	0
SMU	3	–	4	–	0	5	–	6	–	0
TCU	3	–	4	–	0	4	–	6	–	1
Baylor	1	–	6	–	0	2	–	9	–	0
Texas A&M	0	–	7	–	0	2	–	9	–	0
$ – Conference champion; Rankings from AP Poll

The 1970 Rice Owls football team was an American football team that represented Rice University in the Southwest Conference (SWC) during the 1970 NCAA University Division football season. In its fourth and final season under head coach Bo Hagan, the team compiled a 5–5 record (3–4 against SWC opponents), tied for fourth place in the conference, and was outscored by a total of 175 to 168. The team played its home games at Rice Stadium in Houston.

The team's statistical leaders included Philip Wood with 489 passing yards and 30 points scored, Stahle Vincent with 453 rushing yards, and Mike Philips with 192 receiving yards. Two Rice players were selected by the Associated Press as first-team players on the 1970 All-Southwest Conference football team: middle guard Roger Roitsch and defensive back Bucky Allhouse.

== Schedule ==
Date	Time	Opponent	Site	Result	Attendance	Source
September 19		VMI*	Rice Stadium; Houston, TX	W 42–0	15,000	
September 26		at LSU*	Tiger Stadium; Baton Rouge, LA	L 0–24	65,000	
October 3	7:30 p.m.	California*	Rice Stadium; Houston, TX	W 28–0	22,000	
October 17		at SMU	Cotton Bowl; Dallas, TX (rivalry)	L 0–10	24,955	
October 24		No. 2 Texas	Rice Stadium; Houston, TX (rivalry)	L 21–45	70,500	
October 31		Texas Tech	Rice Stadium; Houston, TX	L 0–3	25,000	
November 7		at No. 7 Arkansas	Razorback Stadium; Fayetteville, AR	L 14–38	40,000	
November 14		at Texas A&M	Kyle Field; College Station, TX	W 18–17	25,443	
November 21		TCU	Rice Stadium; Houston, TX	W 17–15	18,000	
November 28		at Baylor	Baylor Stadium; Waco, TX	W 28–23	22,000	
*Non-conference game; Rankings from AP Poll released prior to the game; All times are in Central time

== Roster ==
1970 Rice Owls football team roster
Players
Coaches
Offense

Pos.	#	Name	Class
WR	80	Joe Buck	So
TE	81	Gary Butler	So
WR	42	Tom Clanton	So
QB	15	Jimmy Davis	Jr
OT	74	Sam Johnson	So
QB	14	John Kelly	So
QB	16	Mike Kramer	Jr
QB	11	Philip Wood	Jr

Defense

Pos.	#	Name	Class
LB	45	Tommy Alexander	Sr
S	48	Chris Hale	Jr
CB	43	David Keys	Sr
CB	28	Gilbert King	Jr
S	27	Bill Latourette	Jr
LB	33	Mike Lee	Jr

Special teams

Pos.	#	Name	Class

Head coach

- Bo Hagan

Coordinators/assistant coaches

Legend

- (C) Team captain
- (S) Suspended
- (I) Ineligible
- Injured
- Redshirt
