= 1970 TCU Horned Frogs football team =

American college football season

1970 TCU Horned Frogs football
- Conference: Southwest Conference
- Record: 4–6–1 (3–4 SWC)
- Head coach: Fred Taylor (4th season)
- Offensive scheme: TCU spread
- Home stadium: Amon G. Carter Stadium

1970 Southwest Conference football standings
	Conf.					Overall
Team	W		L		T	W		L		T
No. 3 Texas $	7	–	0	–	0	10	–	1	–	0
No. 11 Arkansas	6	–	1	–	0	9	–	2	–	0
Texas Tech	5	–	2	–	0	8	–	4	–	0
Rice	3	–	4	–	0	5	–	5	–	0
SMU	3	–	4	–	0	5	–	6	–	0
TCU	3	–	4	–	0	4	–	6	–	1
Baylor	1	–	6	–	0	2	–	9	–	0
Texas A&M	0	–	7	–	0	2	–	9	–	0
$ – Conference champion; Rankings from AP Poll

The 1970 TCU Horned Frogs football team represented Texas Christian University (TCU) in the 1970 NCAA University Division football season. The Horned Frogs finished the season 4–6–1 overall and 3–4 in the Southwest Conference. The team was coached by Fred Taylor, in his fourth and final year as head coach. The Frogs played their home games in Amon G. Carter Stadium, which is located on campus in Fort Worth, Texas.

== Schedule ==
Date	Opponent	Site	Result	Attendance	Source
September 12	UT Arlington*	Amon G. Carter Stadium; Fort Worth, TX	W 31–7	25,427	
September 19	at Purdue*	Ross–Ade Stadium; West Lafayette, IN	L 0–15	65,808	
September 26	at Wisconsin*	Camp Randall Stadium; Madison, WI	T 14–14	61,539	
October 3	No. 11 Arkansas	Amon G. Carter Stadium; Fort Worth, TX	L 14–49	39,136	
October 10	at Oklahoma State*	Lewis Field; Stillwater, OK	L 20–34	24,500	
October 17	at Texas A&M	Kyle Field; College Station, TX (rivalry)	W 31–15	29,256	
October 31	Baylor	Amon G. Carter Stadium; Fort Worth, TX (rivalry)	W 24–17	21,817	
November 7	at Texas Tech	Jones Stadium; Lubbock, TX (rivalry)	L 14–22	40,100	
November 14	No. 2 Texas	Amon G. Carter Stadium; Fort Worth, TX (rivalry)	L 0–58	40,179	
November 21	at Rice	Rice Stadium; Houston, TX	L 15–17	18,000	
November 28	SMU	Amon G. Carter Stadium; Fort Worth, TX (rivalry)	W 26–17	17,118	
*Non-conference game; Rankings from AP Poll released prior to the game

== Roster ==
1970 TCU Horned Frogs football team roster
Players
Coaches
Offense

Pos.	#	Name	Class
RB	25	Ken Balfanz	Jr
WR	80	Mike Barmore	So
WR	26	Lane Bowen	So
TE	84	Nelson Campbell	So
QB	19	Don Carter	So
QB	18	Steve Judy	Jr
RB	41	Bobby Davis	Jr
WR	82	Steve DeRouen	So
OT	58	Lloyd Draper	So
G	60	J.R. Eubanks	Jr
G	62	Steve Frost	Jr
TE	86	Frankie Grimmett	So
RB	40	Larry Harris	So
RB	34	Lee Harris	So
WR	83	John Hetherly	Jr
RB	35	Bobby Hickey	So
RB	36	James Hodges	Jr
OT	70	Gerald Kirby	Sr
WR	15	James Lester	So
RB	33	Vernon Marler	Sr
C	51	Jim Montgomery	So
G	76	Guy Morriss	So
TE	87	Ronnie Peoples	So
RB	23	Ray Rhodes	So
C	57	John Ruthstrom	Sr
RB	22	Steve Sanford	So
WR	28	Larry Speake	Jr
QB	10	Busty Underwood	Sr
G	64	Jerry Wauson	So
OT	77	Dean Wilkerson	Sr

Defense

Pos.	#	Name	Class
LB	54	Tookie Beery	So
LB, K	50	John Bishop	So
CB	12	Danny Colbert	So
DE	78	Bob Creech	Sr
DT	75	Jay DeFee	Jr
DT	72	Larry Dibbles	So
DL	68	Craig Fife	Jr
DL	69	Dave Glass	Jr
DB	38	Dave Dixon	So
DB	16	Bob Foster	Jr
CB	11	Ervin Garnett	So
DT	61	Jerry Hale	So
DT	79	Ken Hanson	So
LB	30	James Helwig	So
DE	53	Gary Martinec	Jr
S	27	David McGinnis	So
LB	31	Doug McKinnon	Jr
S	32	Hodges Mitchell	So
DE	85	Rusty Putt	So
DE	67	Nate Ray	So
LB	74	Bob Schobel	Jr
DT	73	Ken Steel	So
LB	52	Roy Topham	So
DB	24	Greg Webb	Sr
DB	39	Rich Wiseman	So

Special teams

Pos.	#	Name	Class
P	17	Guy Bob Buschman	So

Head coach

- Fred Taylor

Coordinators/assistant coaches

Legend

- (C) Team captain
- (S) Suspended
- (I) Ineligible
- Injured
- Redshirt
