= 1970 SMU Mustangs football team =

American college football season

1970 SMU Mustangs football
- Conference: Southwest Conference
- Record: 5–6 (3–4 SWC)
- Head coach: Hayden Fry (9th season)
- Home stadium: Cotton Bowl

1970 Southwest Conference football standings
| | Conf. | | | | | Overall |
| Team | W | | L | | T | W | | L | | T |
|---|---|---|---|---|---|---|---|---|---|---|
| No. 3 Texas $ | 7 | – | 0 | – | 0 | 10 | – | 1 | – | 0 |
| No. 11 Arkansas | 6 | – | 1 | – | 0 | 9 | – | 2 | – | 0 |
| Texas Tech | 5 | – | 2 | – | 0 | 8 | – | 4 | – | 0 |
| Rice | 3 | – | 4 | – | 0 | 5 | – | 5 | – | 0 |
| SMU | 3 | – | 4 | – | 0 | 5 | – | 6 | – | 0 |
| TCU | 3 | – | 4 | – | 0 | 4 | – | 6 | – | 1 |
| Baylor | 1 | – | 6 | – | 0 | 2 | – | 9 | – | 0 |
| Texas A&M | 0 | – | 7 | – | 0 | 2 | – | 9 | – | 0 |
$ – Conference champion; Rankings from AP Poll

The 1970 SMU Mustangs football team represented Southern Methodist University (SMU) as a member of the Southwest Conference (SWC) during the 1970 NCAA University Division football season. Led by ninth-year head coach Hayden Fry, the Mustangs compiled an overall record of 5–6 with a conference mark of 3–4, tying for fourth place in the SWC.

== Schedule ==
| Date | Opponent | Site | Result | Attendance | Source |
|---|---|---|---|---|---|
| September 12 | No. T–20 Oklahoma* | Cotton Bowl; Dallas, TX | L 11–28 | 51,909 | |
| September 19 | at Tennessee* | Neyland Stadium; Knoxville, TN | L 3–28 | 54,158 | |
| September 26 | New Mexico State* | Cotton Bowl; Dallas, TX | W 34–21 | 30,264 | |
| October 3 | at Northwestern* | Dyche Stadium; Evanston, IL | W 21–20 | 30,003 | |
| October 17 | Rice | Cotton Bowl; Dallas, TX (rivalry) | W 10–0 | 24,955 | |
| October 24 | at Texas Tech | Jones Stadium; Lubbock, TX | L 10–14 | 46,258 | |
| October 31 | at No. 1 Texas | Memorial Stadium; Austin, TX | L 15–42 | 66,500 | |
| November 7 | Texas A&M | Cotton Bowl; Dallas, TX | W 6–3 | 27,918 | |
| November 14 | at No. 7 Arkansas | Razorback Stadium; Fayetteville, AR | L 3–36 | 43,500 | |
| November 21 | Baylor | Cotton Bowl; Dallas, TX | W 23–10 | 22,963 | |
| November 28 | at TCU | Amon G. Carter Stadium; Fort Worth, TX (rivalry) | L 17–26 | 17,118 | |
*Non-conference game; Rankings from AP Poll released prior to the game

== Roster ==
1970 SMU Mustangs football team roster
Players
Coaches
Offense

| Pos. | # | Name | Class |
|---|---|---|---|
| QB | 11 | Gary Carter | Sr |
| RB | 17 | Gary Hammond | Jr |
| QB | 10 | Chuck Hixson | Sr |
| OT | 63 | Bill Line | Jr |
| G | 73 | John Meyer |

Defense

| Pos. | # | Name | Class |
|---|---|---|---|
| DB | 24 | Pat Curry |
| DB | 43 | Robert Popelka | So |

Special teams

| Pos. | # | Name | Class |

Head coach

- Hayden Fry

Coordinators/assistant coaches

Legend

- (C) Team captain
- (S) Suspended
- (I) Ineligible
- Injured
- Redshirt

== Team players in the NFL ==
| Player | Position | Round | Pick | NFL club |
|---|---|---|---|---|
| Chuck Hixson | Quarterback | 13 | 328 | Kansas City Chiefs |
