= 1970 Baylor Bears football team =

American college football season

1970 Baylor Bears football
- Conference: Southwest Conference
- Record: 2–9 (1–6 SWC)
- Head coach: Bill Beall (2nd season)
- Captains: Derek Davis; David Jones
- Home stadium: Baylor Stadium

1970 Southwest Conference football standings
	Conf.					Overall
Team	W		L		T	W		L		T
No. 3 Texas $	7	–	0	–	0	10	–	1	–	0
No. 11 Arkansas	6	–	1	–	0	9	–	2	–	0
Texas Tech	5	–	2	–	0	8	–	4	–	0
Rice	3	–	4	–	0	5	–	5	–	0
SMU	3	–	4	–	0	5	–	6	–	0
TCU	3	–	4	–	0	4	–	6	–	1
Baylor	1	–	6	–	0	2	–	9	–	0
Texas A&M	0	–	7	–	0	2	–	9	–	0
$ – Conference champion; Rankings from AP Poll

The 1970 Baylor Bears football team represented the Baylor University in the 1970 NCAA University Division football season. The Bears offense scored 133 points, while the Bears defense allowed 259 points. In the Battle of the Brazos, the Bears beat Texas A&M by a score of 29–24.

== Schedule ==
Date	Time	Opponent	Site	Result	Attendance	Source
September 11		vs. No. 11 Missouri*	Busch Memorial Stadium; St. Louis, MO	L 0–38	32,000	
September 19	1:00 p.m.	at Army*	Michie Stadium; West Point, NY	W 10–7	36,539	
September 26		Pittsburgh*	Baylor Stadium; Waco, TX	L 10–15	20,000	
October 3		at LSU*	Tiger Stadium; Baton Rouge, LA	L 10–31	60,000	
October 10		at No. 10 Arkansas	War Memorial Stadium; Little Rock, AR	L 7–41	53,000	
October 24		Texas A&M^{†}	Baylor Stadium; Waco, TX (rivalry)	W 29–24	41,000	
October 31		at TCU	Amon G. Carter Stadium; Fort Worth, TX (rivalry)	L 17–24	21,817	
November 7		No. 1 Texas	Baylor Stadium; Waco, TX (rivalry)	L 14–21	36,000	
November 14		Texas Tech	Baylor Stadium; Waco, TX (rivalry)	L 3–7	19,000	
November 21		at SMU	Cotton Bowl; Dallas, TX	L 10–23	22,963	
November 28		Rice	Baylor Stadium; Waco, TX	L 23–28	22,000	
*Non-conference game; ^{†}Homecoming; Rankings from AP Poll released prior to the game; All times are in Central time

== Team players drafted into the NFL ==
The following players were drafted into professional football following the season.

Player	Position	Round	Pick	Franchise
Dave Jones	Linebacker	11	286	Baltimore Colts
