= 1970 Texas Tech Red Raiders football team =

American college football season

1970 Texas Tech Red Raiders football

Sun Bowl, L 9–17 vs. Georgia Tech
- Conference: Southwest Conference
- Record: 8–4 (5–2 SWC)
- Head coach: Jim Carlen (1st season)
- Offensive scheme: No-huddle option
- Defensive coordinator: Richard Bell (1st season)
- Base defense: 4–3
- Home stadium: Jones Stadium

1970 Southwest Conference football standings
| | Conf. | | | | | Overall |
| Team | W | | L | | T | W | | L | | T |
|---|---|---|---|---|---|---|---|---|---|---|
| No. 3 Texas $ | 7 | – | 0 | – | 0 | 10 | – | 1 | – | 0 |
| No. 11 Arkansas | 6 | – | 1 | – | 0 | 9 | – | 2 | – | 0 |
| Texas Tech | 5 | – | 2 | – | 0 | 8 | – | 4 | – | 0 |
| Rice | 3 | – | 4 | – | 0 | 5 | – | 5 | – | 0 |
| SMU | 3 | – | 4 | – | 0 | 5 | – | 6 | – | 0 |
| TCU | 3 | – | 4 | – | 0 | 4 | – | 6 | – | 1 |
| Baylor | 1 | – | 6 | – | 0 | 2 | – | 9 | – | 0 |
| Texas A&M | 0 | – | 7 | – | 0 | 2 | – | 9 | – | 0 |
$ – Conference champion; Rankings from AP Poll

The 1970 Texas Tech Red Raiders football team represented Texas Tech University in the Southwest Conference (SWC) during the 1970 NCAA University Division football season. In their first season under head coach Jim Carlen, the Red Raiders compiled an 8–4 record (5–2 against conference opponents), finished in third place in the SWC, lost to Georgia Tech in the 1970 Sun Bowl, and outscored all opponents by a combined total of 222 to 165. The team's statistical leaders included Charles Napper with 979 passing yards, Doug McCutchen with 1,068 rushing yards, and Johnny Odom with 331 receiving yards. The team played its home games at Clifford B. & Audrey Jones Stadium.

== Schedule ==
| Date | Opponent | Rank | Site | TV | Result | Attendance | Source |
|---|---|---|---|---|---|---|---|
| September 12 | Tulane* | | Jones Stadium; Lubbock, TX | | W 21–14 | 43,250 | |
| September 19 | at Kansas* | | Memorial Stadium; Lawrence, KS | | W 23–0 | 36,355–38,700 | |
| September 26 | No. 2 Texas | | Jones Stadium; Lubbock, TX (rivalry) | | L 13–35 | 53,124 | |
| October 3 | UC Santa Barbara* | | Jones Stadium; Lubbock, TX | | W 63–21 | 34,000 | |
| October 10 | at Texas A&M | | Kyle Field; College Station, TX (rivalry) | | W 21–7 | 43,075 | |
| October 17 | at Mississippi State* | No. 17 | Mississippi Veterans Memorial Stadium; Jackson, MS | | L 16–20 | 19,050 | |
| October 24 | SMU^{†} | | Jones Stadium; Lubbock, TX | | W 14–10 | 46,258 | |
| October 31 | at Rice | | Rice Stadium; Houston, TX | | W 3–0 | 25,000 | |
| November 7 | TCU | | Jones Stadium; Lubbock, TX (rivalry) | | W 22–14 | 40,100 | |
| November 14 | at Baylor | | Baylor Stadium; Waco, TX (rivalry) | | W 7–3 | 19,000 | |
| November 21 | No. 6 Arkansas | No. 19 | Jones Stadium; Lubbock, TX (rivalry) | | L 10–24 | 50,125 | |
| December 19 | vs. No. 13 Georgia Tech* | No. 19 | Sun Bowl; El Paso, TX (Sun Bowl) | CBS | L 9–17 | 26,188 | |
*Non-conference game; ^{†}Homecoming; Rankings from AP Poll released prior to the game
