= Greg Pipes =

American gridiron football player (1946–2021)

No. 61
- Position: Defensive tackle

Personal information
- Born: August 4, 1946; Fort Worth, Texas, U.S.
- Died: October 15, 2021 (aged 75)
- Listed height: 5 ft 10 in (1.78 m)
- Listed weight: 235 lb (107 kg)

Career information
- College: Baylor
- NFL draft: 1968: 12th round, 306th overall pick

Career history
- 1968–1972: Edmonton Eskimos

Awards and highlights
- DeMarco-Becket Memorial Trophy (1970); CFL All-Star (1970); CFL West All-Star (1970); First-team All-American (1967); 2× First-team All-SWC (1966, 1967)

Greg Pipes (August 4, 1946 – October 15, 2021) was an American professional award-winning and all-star defensive tackle in the Canadian Football League (CFL) with the Edmonton Eskimos from 1968 to 1972.

A graduate of Baylor University, he was picked for the 1967 College Football All-America Team and was selected by the Buffalo Bills of the National Football League (NFL). Pipes played five seasons with the Eskimos. His best year was 1970, when he was an all-star and winner of the DeMarco-Becket Memorial Trophy as best lineman in the Western Division.

He returned to Baylor after his playing days and earned a Juris Doctor degree. He had a 35-year career with the District Attorney's office in Tarrant County.

Greg Pipes died on October 15, 2021, in Arlington, Texas.
