= 1970 Texas A&M Aggies football team =

American college football season

1970 Texas A&M Aggies football
- Conference: Southwest Conference
- Record: 2–9 (0–7 SWC)
- Head coach: Gene Stallings (6th season)
- Home stadium: Kyle Field

1970 Southwest Conference football standings
	Conf.					Overall
Team	W		L		T	W		L		T
No. 3 Texas $	7	–	0	–	0	10	–	1	–	0
No. 11 Arkansas	6	–	1	–	0	9	–	2	–	0
Texas Tech	5	–	2	–	0	8	–	4	–	0
Rice	3	–	4	–	0	5	–	5	–	0
SMU	3	–	4	–	0	5	–	6	–	0
TCU	3	–	4	–	0	4	–	6	–	1
Baylor	1	–	6	–	0	2	–	9	–	0
Texas A&M	0	–	7	–	0	2	–	9	–	0
$ – Conference champion; Rankings from AP Poll

The 1970 Texas A&M Aggies football team represented Texas A&M University in the 1970 NCAA University Division football season as a member of the Southwest Conference (SWC). The Aggies were led by head coach Gene Stallings in his sixth season and finished with a record of two wins and nine losses (2–9 overall, 0–7 in the SWC).

== Schedule ==
Date	Opponent	Site	Result	Attendance	Source
September 12	Wichita State*	Kyle Field; College Station, TX	W 41–14	30,006	
September 19	at No. 12 LSU*	Tiger Stadium; Baton Rouge, LA (rivalry)	W 20–18	67,590	
September 26	at No. 1 Ohio State*	Ohio Stadium; Columbus, OH	L 13–56	85,657	
October 3	at No. 9 Michigan*	Michigan Stadium; Ann Arbor, MI	L 10–14	71,732	
October 10	Texas Tech	Kyle Field; College Station, TX (rivalry)	L 7–21	43,075	
October 17	TCU	Kyle Field; College Station, TX (rivalry)	L 15–31	29,256	
October 24	at Baylor	Baylor Stadium; Waco, TX (rivalry)	L 24–29	41,000	
October 31	No. 8 Arkansas	Kyle Field; College Station, TX (rivalry)	L 6–45	34,000	
November 7	at SMU	Cotton Bowl; Dallas, TX	L 3–6	27,918	
November 14	Rice	Kyle Field; College Station, TX	L 17–18	25,443	
November 26	at No. 1 Texas	Memorial Stadium; Austin, TX (rivalry)	L 14–52	66,400	
*Non-conference game; Rankings from AP Poll released prior to the game

== Personnel ==
1970 Texas A&M Aggies football team roster
Players
Coaches
Offense

Pos.	#	Name	Class
RB		Marc Black
RB		Steve Burks
OL		Buster Callaway
OL		Benny DeWitt
RB		Brad Dusek
QB	10	Lex James	So
WR	48	Mike Dorough	So
OL		Mike Fields
OL		Leonard Forey
RB		Johnny Gardner
OT	73	Robert Garesimowiez	So
WR		Tommy Goodwin
WR		Joey Herr
QB		Joe Mac King
TE		Roy Kirkpatrick
TE		Homer May
WR	35	Hugh McElroy
OL		Lenard Millsap
FB	39	Doug Neill	Jr
OL		Mike Park
OL		Adam Philley
WR	28	Billy Joe Polasek	Jr
RB		Doug Robbins
QB		Rocky Self
RB		Jimmy Sheffield
WR		John Sweeden

Defense

Pos.	#	Name	Class
DL		Boice Best
DL		Max Bird
DB		Mike Bunger
DL		Todd Christopher
DB		Ed Ebrom
S	36	Dave Elmendorf	Sr
LB		Kent Finley
DL		Barb Hinnant
DB		Lee Hitt
S		David Hoot
DB	24	Chris Johnson	Jr
LB		Mike Lord
LB	55	Steve Luebbehusen	Jr
LB		Gary McCaffrey
DB		Robert Murski
DL		Van Odom
DL		Dale Watts
DB	37	Gary Whitehead	So

Special teams

Pos.	#	Name	Class
K		Mike Bellar
K		Pat McDermott

Head coach

- Gene Stallings

Coordinators/assistant coaches

Legend

- (C) Team captain
- (S) Suspended
- (I) Ineligible
- Injured
- Redshirt

== Season summary ==
=== At Ohio State ===
Texas A&M Aggies (2–0) at Ohio State Buckeyes (0–0)

Quarter	1	2	3	4	Total
Texas A&M	0	7	0	6	13
Ohio State	21	7	21	7	56

at Ohio Stadium, Columbus, Ohio

- Date: September 26
- Game time: 1:30 p.m.
- Game weather: Cloudy, 80 °F (27 °C)
- Game attendance: 85,657
- Box Score

Game information

First quarter

- OSU – Rex Kern 6-yard run (Frank Schram kick), 11:45. Ohio State 7–0. Drive:
- OSU – John Brockington 2-yard run (Frank Schram kick), 7:27. Ohio State 14–0. Drive:
- OSU – Leo Hayden 3-yard run (Frank Schram kick), 3:13. Ohio State 21–0. Drive:

Second quarter

- A&M – Homer May 29-yard pass from Lex James (Pat McDermott kick), Ohio State 21–7. Drive:
- OSU – John Brockington 1-yard run (Frank Schram kick), 0:16. Ohio State 28–7. Drive:

Third quarter

- OSU – Jan White 5-yard pass from Ron Maciejowski (Frank Schram kick), 6:10. Ohio State 35–7. Drive:
- OSU – Larry Zelina 11-yard run (Frank Schram kick), 5:23. Ohio State 42–7. Drive:
- OSU – James Coburn 7-yard run (Frank Schram kick), 2:47. Ohio State 49–7. Drive:

Fourth quarter

- OSU – Ron Maciejowski 1-yard run (Frank Schram kick), 13:15. Ohio State 56–7. Drive:
- A&M – Homer May 22-yard pass from Lex James (kick failed), 5:17. Ohio State 56–13. Drive:

Top passers

- A&M – Lex James – 18/30, 271 yards, 2 TD, INT
- OSU – Rex Kern – 4/6, 71 yards

Top rushers

- A&M – Steve Burks – 7 rushes, 28 yards
- OSU – Leo Hayden – 14 rushes, 89 yards, TD

Top receivers

- A&M – Hugh McElroy – 4 receptions, 71 yards
- OSU – Leo Hayden – 3 receptions, 37 yards

=== At Michigan ===
Texas A&M Aggies (2–1) at #9 Michigan Wolverines (2–0)

Quarter	1	2	3	4	Total
Texas A&M	7	3	0	0	10
Michigan	0	7	0	7	14

at Michigan Stadium, Ann Arbor, Michigan

- Date: October 3
- Game attendance: 71,732
- Recap/Box

Game information

First quarter

- A&M – Steve Burks 10-yard run (Mike Bellar kick). Texas A&M 7–0. Drive: 50 yards

Second quarter

- A&M – Mike Bellar 21-yard field goal. Texas A&M 10–0. Drive:
- MICH – Billy Taylor 1-yard run (Tim Killian kick), 11:06. Texas A&M 10–7. Drive:

Third quarter

- No scoring

Fourth quarter

- MICH – Don Moorhead 7-yard run (Tim Killian kick). Michigan 14–10. Drive: 62 yards

Top passers

- A&M – Lex James – 11/24, 123 yards, INT
- MICH – Don Moorhead – 3/16, 35 yards, 2 INT

Top rushers

- A&M – Doug Neill – 17 rushes, 99 yards
- MICH – Fritz Seyferth – 12 rushes, 64 yards

Top receivers

- A&M – Homer May – 5 receptions, 51 yards
- MICH – Paul Seymour – 1 reception, 16 yards
