= Grady Allen =

American football player (1946–2012)

- Allen in 1972

No. 54
- Position: Linebacker

Personal information
- Born: January 1, 1946; San Augustine, Texas, U.S.
- Died: December 4, 2012 (aged 66); Dallas, Texas, U.S.
- Listed height: 6 ft 3 in (1.91 m)
- Listed weight: 225 lb (102 kg)

Career information
- High school: Nacogdoches (TX)
- College: Texas A&M
- NFL draft: 1968: undrafted

Career history
- Atlanta Falcons (1968–1972)

Awards and highlights
- First-team All-SWC (1967)

Career NFL statistics
- Fumble recoveries: 3
- Interceptions: 2
- Sacks: 2
- Stats at Pro Football Reference

Grady Lynn Allen (January 1, 1946 – December 4, 2012) was an American professional football player who was a linebacker in the National Football League (NFL) for five seasons for the Atlanta Falcons.

== Biography ==
Allen was born in San Augustine, Texas on January 1, 1946.

He played defensive end for Texas A&M from 1965 to 1967. During his senior year he was a team captain, earned all Southwest Conference honors, and helped A&M to its first Cotton Bowl appearance in 27 years. They upset Alabama 20–16, and Allen was given the annual Aggie Heart award by the team,

Not chosen in the NFL draft, Allen played as a reserve linebacker in 59 games for the Atlanta Falcons over 5 seasons from 1968 until 1972, recording 2 interceptions and 3 fumble recoveries. Allen played in all 14 games each season, except for 1971, where an injury limited him to 3 games.

Allen was inducted into the Texas A&M Hall of Fame in 1995 and served as president of the Texas A&M Lettermen's Association in 2006.

Allen died of cardiac arrest on December 4, 2012. His son Dennis served as the head coach of the Oakland Raiders from 2012 until 2014 and the New Orleans Saints from 2022 to 2024.
