= 1967 Baylor Bears football team =

American college football season

1967 Baylor Bears football
- Conference: Southwest Conference
- Record: 1–8–1 (0–6–1 SWC)
- Head coach: John Bridgers (9th season)
- Captains: Greg Pipes; Randy Behringer
- Home stadium: Baylor Stadium

1967 Southwest Conference football standings
	Conf.					Overall
Team	W		L		T	W		L		T
Texas A&M $	6	–	1	–	0	7	–	4	–	0
Texas Tech	5	–	2	–	0	6	–	4	–	0
Texas	4	–	3	–	0	6	–	4	–	0
TCU	4	–	3	–	0	4	–	6	–	0
Arkansas	3	–	3	–	1	4	–	5	–	1
SMU	3	–	4	–	0	3	–	7	–	0
Rice	2	–	5	–	0	4	–	6	–	0
Baylor	0	–	6	–	1	1	–	8	–	1
$ – Conference champion

The 1967 Baylor Bears football team represented Baylor University in the Southwest Conference (SWC) during the 1967 NCAA University Division football season. In their ninth season under head coach John Bridgers, the Bears compiled a 1–8–1 record (0–6–1 against conference opponents), finished in last place in the conference, and were outscored by opponents by a combined total of 199 to 101. They played their home games at Baylor Stadium in Waco, Texas.

The team's statistical leaders included Alvin Flynn with 924 passing yards, Charles Wilson with 553 rushing yards, and George Cheshire with 475 receiving yards and 24 points scored. Greg Pipes and Randy Behringer were the team captains.

== Schedule ==
Date	Opponent	Site	Result	Attendance	Source
September 16	at No. 10 Colorado*	Folsom Field; Boulder, CO	L 7–27	31,400	
September 23	at Syracuse*	Archbold Stadium; Syracuse, NY	L 0–7	31,457	
October 7	Washington State*	Baylor Stadium; Waco, TX	W 10–7	20,000	
October 14	Arkansas	Baylor Stadium; Waco, TX	T 10–10	32,000	
October 28	at Texas A&M	Kyle Field; College Station, TX (rivalry)	L 3–21	37,720	
November 4	TCU^{†}	Baylor Stadium; Waco, TX (rivalry)	L 7–29	25,000	
November 11	at Texas	Memorial Stadium; Austin, TX (rivalry)	L 0–24	55,000	
November 18	at Texas Tech	Jones Stadium; Lubbock, TX (rivalry)	L 29–31	34,000	
November 25	SMU	Baylor Stadium; Waco, TX	L 10–16	20,000	
December 2	at Rice	Rice Stadium; Houston, TX	L 25–27	18,000	
*Non-conference game; ^{†}Homecoming; Rankings from AP Poll released prior to the game
