= 1967 Texas A&M Aggies football team =

American college football season

1967 Texas A&M Aggies football

SWC champion Cotton Bowl Classic champion

Cotton Bowl Classic, W 20–16 vs. Alabama
- Conference: Southwest Conference
- Record: 7–4 (6–1 SWC)
- Head coach: Gene Stallings (3rd season)
- Home stadium: Kyle Field

1967 Southwest Conference football standings
	Conf.					Overall
Team	W		L		T	W		L		T
Texas A&M $	6	–	1	–	0	7	–	4	–	0
Texas Tech	5	–	2	–	0	6	–	4	–	0
Texas	4	–	3	–	0	6	–	4	–	0
TCU	4	–	3	–	0	4	–	6	–	0
Arkansas	3	–	3	–	1	4	–	5	–	1
SMU	3	–	4	–	0	3	–	7	–	0
Rice	2	–	5	–	0	4	–	6	–	0
Baylor	0	–	6	–	1	1	–	8	–	1
$ – Conference champion

The 1967 Texas A&M Aggies football team represented Texas A&M University in the 1967 NCAA University Division football season as a member of the Southwest Conference (SWC). The Aggies were led by head coach Gene Stallings in his third season and finished with a record of seven wins and four losses (7–4 overall, 6–1 in the SWC), as Southwest Conference champions and with a victory in the Cotton Bowl Classic over Alabama.

== Schedule ==
Date	Opponent	Site	TV	Result	Attendance	Source
September 16	SMU	Kyle Field; College Station, TX		L 17–20	33,000	
September 23	vs. Purdue*	Cotton Bowl; Dallas, TX		L 20–24	27,500	
September 30	at LSU*	Tiger Stadium; Baton Rouge, LA (rivalry)		L 6–17	66,510	
October 7	Florida State*	Kyle Field; College Station, TX		L 18–19	20,000	
October 14	at Texas Tech	Jones Stadium; Lubbock, TX (rivalry)		W 28–24	48,240	
October 21	at TCU	Amon G. Carter Stadium; Fort Worth, TX		W 20–0	37,166	
October 28	Baylor	Kyle Field; College Station, TX (rivalry)		W 21–3	37,720	
November 4	at Arkansas	Razorback Stadium; Fayetteville, AR (rivalry)		W 33–21	41,100	
November 18	at Rice	Rice Stadium; Houston, TX		W 18–3	58,000	
November 23	Texas	Kyle Field; College Station, TX (rivalry)		W 10–7	50,000	
January 1	vs. No. 8 Alabama*	Cotton Bowl; Dallas, TX (Cotton Bowl Classic)	CBS	W 20–16	73,800	
*Non-conference game; Rankings from AP Poll released prior to the game

== Roster ==
- QB Edd Hargett, Jr.
- LB Bill Hobbs
- DB Curley Hallman, Jr.

OT Dan Schneider, Trafford High
