= Bill Hobbs (American football) =

American football player (1946–2004)

No. 56, 53
- Position: Linebacker

Personal information
- Born: September 18, 1946; Mount Pleasant, Texas, U.S.
- Died: August 21, 2004 (aged 57); San Antonio, Texas, U.S.
- Listed height: 6 ft 0 in (1.83 m)
- Listed weight: 218 lb (99 kg)

Career information
- High school: Tascosa (Amarillo, Texas)
- College: Texas A&M
- NFL draft: 1969: 8th round, 184th overall pick

Career history
- Philadelphia Eagles (1969–1971); New Orleans Saints (1972); New England Patriots (1973); Florida Blazers (1974); San Antonio Wings (1975)

Awards and highlights
- 2× First-team All-American (1967, 1968); 2× First-team All-SWC (1967, 1968)

Career NFL statistics
- Fumble recoveries: 1
- Touchdowns: 1
- Stats at Pro Football Reference

William Glenn Hobbs (September 18, 1946 – August 21, 2004) was an American professional football player who was a linebacker for four seasons in the National Football League (NFL) for the Philadelphia Eagles and New Orleans Saints and two seasons in the World Football League (WFL) for the Florida Blazers and San Antonio Wings. He was selected by the Eagles in the eighth round of the 1969 NFL draft. He played college football for the Texas A&M Aggies.

== College career ==
Hobbs played college football at Texas A&M University, where he was named two-time All-American linebacker (1967 and 1968), 1967 Southwest Conference Player of the Year, the 1968 Cotton Bowl Classic MVP, and National Defensive Player of the Year.

== Professional career ==
Hobbs was selected in the eighth round of the 1969 NFL draft by the Philadelphia Eagles, where he played for three seasons. He played for the New Orleans Saints for the 1972 season. After his NFL career, Hobbs played for the Florida Blazers and San Antonio Wings of the short-lived World Football League.
