= 1967 Texas Longhorns football team =

American college football season

1967 Texas Longhorns football
- Conference: Southwest Conference
- Record: 6–4 (4–3 SWC)
- Head coach: Darrell Royal (11th season)
- Offensive coordinator: Fred Akers (2nd season)
- Offensive scheme: Wing T
- Defensive coordinator: Mike Campbell (1st season)
- Base defense: 6–2
- Home stadium: Memorial Stadium

1967 Southwest Conference football standings
	Conf.					Overall
Team	W		L		T	W		L		T
Texas A&M $	6	–	1	–	0	7	–	4	–	0
Texas Tech	5	–	2	–	0	6	–	4	–	0
Texas	4	–	3	–	0	6	–	4	–	0
TCU	4	–	3	–	0	4	–	6	–	0
Arkansas	3	–	3	–	1	4	–	5	–	1
SMU	3	–	4	–	0	3	–	7	–	0
Rice	2	–	5	–	0	4	–	6	–	0
Baylor	0	–	6	–	1	1	–	8	–	1
$ – Conference champion

The 1967 Texas Longhorns football team was an American football team that represented the University of Texas (now known as the University of Texas at Austin) as a member of the Southwest Conference (SWC) during the 1967 NCAA University Division football season. In their eleventh year under head coach Darrell Royal, the Longhorns compiled an overall record of 6–4, with a mark of 4–3 in conference play, and finished tied for third in the SWC.

After coach Darrell Royal refused a bowl bid in the midst of the Longhorns' third consecutive 6–4 season, Texas played in the next six Cotton Bowls as Southwest Conference champion.

== Schedule ==
Date	Time	Opponent	Rank	Site	TV	Result	Attendance	Source
September 23	10:00 p.m.	at No. 7 USC*	No. 5	Los Angeles Memorial Coliseum; Los Angeles, CA		L 13–17	67,705	
September 30	7:30 p.m.	Texas Tech	No. 8	Memorial Stadium; Austin, TX (rivalry)		L 13–19	66,000	
October 7	7:30 p.m.	Oklahoma State*		Memorial Stadium; Austin, TX		W 19–0	51,000	
October 14	2:00 p.m.	vs. Oklahoma*		Cotton Bowl; Dallas, TX (rivalry)		W 9–7	75,504	
October 21	3:00 p.m.	at Arkansas		War Memorial Stadium; Little Rock, AR (rivalry)	ABC	W 21–12	53,000	
October 28	7:30 p.m.	Rice		Memorial Stadium; Austin, TX (rivalry)		W 28–6	63,000	
November 4	2:00 p.m.	at SMU		Cotton Bowl; Dallas, TX		W 35–28	43,000	
November 11	2:00 p.m.	Baylor		Memorial Stadium; Austin, TX (rivalry)		W 24–0	55,000	
November 18	2:00 p.m.	TCU		Memorial Stadium; Austin, TX (rivalry)		L 17–24	51,000	
November 23	1:30 p.m.	at Texas A&M		Kyle Field; College Station, TX (rivalry)		L 7–10	50,000	
*Non-conference game; Rankings from AP Poll released prior to the game; All times are in Central time
