= Jim Carlen =

American football player, coach, and administrator (1933–2012)

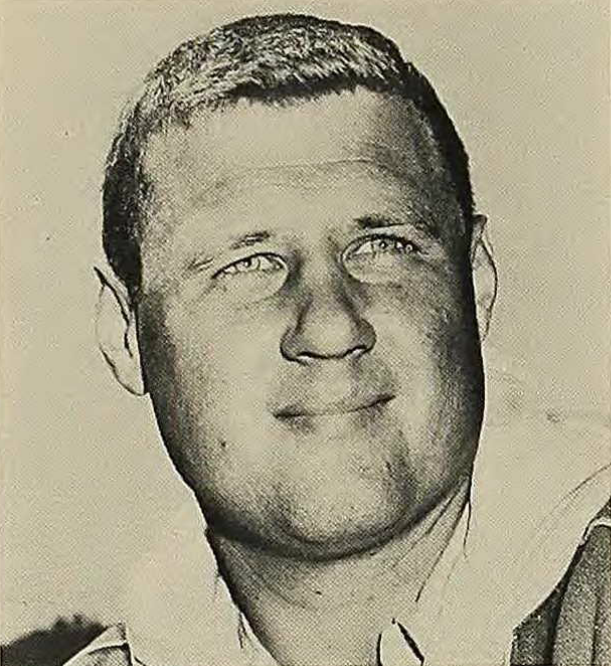
- Carlen in 1962 with Georgia Tech

Biographical details
- Born: July 11, 1933; Cookeville, Tennessee, U.S.
- Died: July 22, 2012 (aged 79); Hilton Head Island, South Carolina, U.S.

Playing career
- 1953–1954: Georgia Tech
- Positions: Linebacker, punter

Coaching career (HC unless noted)
- 1958–1960: Georgia Tech (freshmen)
- 1961–1965: Georgia Tech (defense)
- 1966–1969: West Virginia
- 1970–1974: Texas Tech
- 1975–1981: South Carolina

Administrative career (AD unless noted)
- 1975–1981: South Carolina

Head coaching record
- Overall: 107–69–6
- Bowls: 2–5–1

Accomplishments and honors

Championships
- 1 SoCon (1967)

Awards
- 2× SWC Coach of the Year (1970, 1973)

James Anthony Carlen III (July 11, 1933 – July 22, 2012) was an American football player, coach, and college athletics administrator. He served as the head football coach at West Virginia University (1966–1969) and Texas Tech University (1970–1974). He served as both the head football coach and athletic director of the University of South Carolina (1975–1981). Carlen compiled an overall career college football record of 107–69–6.

== Coaching career ==
Carlen coached the West Virginia Mountaineers from 1966 to 1969 with a record of 25–13–3 (.658). Then he coached the Texas Tech Red Raiders from 1970 to 1974, where he amassed a 37–20–2 record. From 1975 to 1981, he was the head football coach of the South Carolina Gamecocks where he coached Heisman Trophy running back George Rogers and compiled a 45–36–1 record. Carlen 45 wins are third most in the program's history after Steve Spurrier's 86 and Rex Enright's 64. In 1979 and 1980, Carlen led the Gamecocks to consecutive 8–4 campaigns with appearances in the Hall of Fame Classic and Gator Bowl. His career bowl game record is 2–5–1.

In July 2008, four years before his death, Carlen was inducted into the Texas Tech Athletics Hall of Honor.

Coach Carlen was actively involved in the Fellowship of Christian Athletes (FCA) during his entire post-coaching life. In April 2011 he was quoted as saying, “I was one of the original six members of the FCA, the originals. FCA started very small, and then it snowballed. When I hired a coach I always took a close look at his spiritual life,” Carlen said. “When you have God on your side you don’t have to worry.”

== Death ==
Carlen died on July 22, 2012, at the age of seventy-nine at a nursing home near his home at Hilton Head Island in Beaufort County in southeastern South Carolina. A memorial service was scheduled for Friday, July 27, at 4 p.m. at the Trenholm Road United Methodist Church in Columbia, South Carolina.

== Head coaching record ==
| Year | Team | Overall | Conference | Standing | Bowl/playoffs | Coaches^{#} | AP^{°} |
|---|---|---|---|---|---|---|---|
West Virginia Mountaineers (Southern Conference) (1966–1967)
| 1966 | West Virginia | 3–5–2 | 3–0 | 2nd | | | |
| 1967 | West Virginia | 5–4–1 | 4–0–1 | 1st | | | |
West Virginia Mountaineers (NCAA University Division independent) (1968–1969)
| 1968 | West Virginia | 7–3 | | | | | |
| 1969 | West Virginia | 10–1 | | | W Peach | 18 | 17 |
| West Virginia: | | 25–13–3 | 7–0–1 | | | | |
Texas Tech Red Raiders (Southwest Conference) (1970–1974)
| 1970 | Texas Tech | 8–4 | 5–2 | 3rd | L Sun | | |
| 1971 | Texas Tech | 4–7 | 2–5 | 7th | | | |
| 1972 | Texas Tech | 8–4 | 4–3 | T–2nd | L Sun | | |
| 1973 | Texas Tech | 11–1 | 6–1 | 2nd | W Gator | 11 | 11 |
| 1974 | Texas Tech | 6–4–2 | 3–4 | 6th | T Peach | | |
| Texas Tech: | | 37–20–2 | 20–15 | | | | |
South Carolina Gamecocks (NCAA Division I / I-A independent) (1975–1981)
| 1975 | South Carolina | 7–5 | | | L Tangerine | | |
| 1976 | South Carolina | 6–5 | | | | | |
| 1977 | South Carolina | 5–7 | | | | | |
| 1978 | South Carolina | 5–5–1 | | | | | |
| 1979 | South Carolina | 8–4 | | | L Hall of Fame Classic | | |
| 1980 | South Carolina | 8–4 | | | L Gator | | |
| 1981 | South Carolina | 6–6 | | | | | |
| South Carolina: | | 45–36–1 | | | | | |
| Total: | | 107–69–6 | | | | | |
National championship Conference title Conference division title or championship game berth
^{#}Rankings from final Coaches Poll.; ^{°}Rankings from final AP Poll.
