= 1970 Sun Bowl =

American college football game

Georgia Tech Yellow Jackets	Texas Tech Red Raiders
(8–3)	(8–3)
Independent	SWC
17	9
Head coach: Bud Carson	Head coach: Jim Carlen
AP / Coaches; 13 / 17	AP / Coaches; 19 / NR
	1	2	3	4	Total
Georgia Tech	7	3	0	7	17
Texas Tech	0	0	9	0	9
- Date: December 19, 1970
- Season: 1970
- Stadium: Sun Bowl
- Location: El Paso, Texas
- MVP: DT Rock Perdoni (Georgia Tech)
- Attendance: 30,512

United States TV coverage
- Network: CBS
- Announcers: Don Criqui; Frank Gifford

The 1970 Sun Bowl was a college football bowl game that featured the Georgia Tech Yellow Jackets and the Texas Tech Red Raiders.

== Background ==
After three straight 4-6 seasons, the Yellow Jackets had finally broken through in Bud Carson's fourth season as coach and first bowl since the 1967 Orange Bowl. The Red Raiders had finished third in the Southwest Conference in Jim Carlen's first season with the Red Raiders. This was Texas Tech's first bowl since 1965, and their first Sun Bowl since 1964. This was Georgia Tech's first ever Sun Bowl.

== Game summary ==
Jack Williams led the Yellow Jackets on an 11-play, 62-yard drive, culminating with Rob Healy giving the Jackets a 7–0 lead on his 2-yard touchdown run with 10:23 left in the first quarter. Jack Moore made it 10–0 at halftime on his 21-yard field goal with :42 remaining in the half. Texas Tech responded with a Larry Hargrave 50-yard run that set up Doug McCutchen's 7-yard touchdown score to make it 10–7 with 8:13 in the third quarter. When Georgia Tech lined up to punt, Donald Rivers blocked the punt, with the ball sailing into the endzone to make it 10–9 with 6:41 remaining in the 3rd. Early in the fourth quarter, the Red Raiders had a chance to take the lead. However, the short field goal attempt by Dickie Ingram fell short. A Tech fumble was recovered by Bill Flowers at the Red Raider 25, and Kevin McNamara ran in for a 2-yard score six plays later to make it 19–10 with 1:44 remaining. Rock Perdoni had 13 tackles in an MVP effort. Quarterback Jack Williams completed 11 of 14 passes for 123 yards for the Yellow Jackets.

=== Scoring summary ===
- Georgia Tech – Healy 2 yard touchdown run (Thigpen Kick), 10:23, 1st
- Georgia Tech – Moore 21 yard field goal, 0:42, 2nd
- Texas Tech – McCutchen 7 yard touchdown run (Ingram Kick), 8:13, 3rd
- Texas Tech – Safety, 6:41, 3rd
- Georgia Tech – McNamara 2 yard touchdown run (Thigpen Kick), 1:44, 4th

== Aftermath ==
Texas Tech returned to the Sun Bowl in 1972, while the Yellow Jackets did not return until 2011.

== Statistics ==
Statistics	Georgia Tech	Texas Tech
First downs	18	13
Rushing yards	186	215
Passing yards	138	28
Total yards	324	243
Passes: comp-att (int)	13–19 (1)	3–11 (3)
Fumbles–lost	0–0	6–3
Punts–average	6–34.3	4–41.0
Penalties–yards	7–66	4–40
