= 1967 SMU Mustangs football team =

American college football season

1967 SMU Mustangs football
- Conference: Southwest Conference
- Record: 3–7 (3–4 SWC)
- Head coach: Hayden Fry (6th season)
- Home stadium: Cotton Bowl

1967 Southwest Conference football standings
	Conf.					Overall
Team	W		L		T	W		L		T
Texas A&M $	6	–	1	–	0	7	–	4	–	0
Texas Tech	5	–	2	–	0	6	–	4	–	0
Texas	4	–	3	–	0	6	–	4	–	0
TCU	4	–	3	–	0	4	–	6	–	0
Arkansas	3	–	3	–	1	4	–	5	–	1
SMU	3	–	4	–	0	3	–	7	–	0
Rice	2	–	5	–	0	4	–	6	–	0
Baylor	0	–	6	–	1	1	–	8	–	1
$ – Conference champion

The 1967 SMU Mustangs football team represented Southern Methodist University (SMU) as a member of the Southwest Conference (SWC) during the 1967 NCAA University Division football season. Led by sixth-year head coach Hayden Fry, the Mustangs compiled an overall record of 3–7 with a conference mark of 3–4, placing sixth in the SWC.

== Schedule ==
Date	Opponent	Site	Result	Attendance	Source
September 16	at Texas A&M	Kyle Field; College Station, TX	W 20–17	33,000	
September 23	at Missouri*	Memorial Stadium; Columbia, MO	L 0–21	53,000	
October 7	at Minnesota*	Memorial Stadium; Minneapolis, MN	L 3–23	41,528–41,840	
October 13	Army*	Cotton Bowl; Dallas, TX	L 6–24	26,000–26,500	
October 21	at Rice	Rice Stadium; Houston, TX (rivalry)	L 10–14	42,000	
October 28	Texas Tech	Cotton Bowl; Dallas, TX	L 7–21	34,000	
November 4	Texas	Cotton Bowl; Dallas, TX	L 28–35	43,000	
November 18	Arkansas	Cotton Bowl; Dallas, TX	L 17–35	25,000	
November 25	at Baylor	Baylor Stadium; Waco, TX	W 16–10	20,000	
December 2	TCU	Cotton Bowl; Dallas, TX (rivalry)	W 28–14	17,000	
*Non-conference game
