= Tommy Maxwell =

American football player (born 1947)

No. 42
- Position: Defensive back

Personal information
- Born: May 5, 1947 (age 79); Houston, Texas, U.S.
- Listed height: 6 ft 2 in (1.88 m)
- Listed weight: 195 lb (88 kg)

Career information
- High school: Jesse H. Jones (Houston)
- College: Texas A&M
- NFL draft: 1969: 2nd round, 51st overall pick

Career history
- Baltimore Colts (1969–1970); Oakland Raiders (1971–1973); Houston Oilers (1974)

Awards and highlights
- Super Bowl champion (V)

Career NFL statistics
- Interceptions: 5
- Fumble recoveries: 4
- Stats at Pro Football Reference

Tommy Marshall Maxwell (born May 5, 1947) is an American former professional football player who was a defensive back in the National Football League (NFL). After playing college football for the Texas A&M Aggies, he spent six seasons playing in the NFL. In his second season, he helped the Baltimore Colts win Super Bowl V.

He is the founder of Coaches Outreach, a non-profit Christian organization that aims to spiritually develop high school coaches and their spouses.

== College career ==
Maxwell lettered in football at Texas A&M University from 1966 to 1968. In the 1967 season, he helped the Aggies win a Southwest Conference (SWC) title after a 0–4 start. The Aggies were invited to play the Cotton Bowl Classic, in which they defeated the Alabama Crimson Tide. Maxwell caught a TD pass and made an interception in that game. Coach Gene Stallings is quoted as saying, "Tommy will hurt you on either side of the ball." He was also named a first-team All-SWC wide receiver in the same season and a first-team All-American defensive back in 1968. Maxwell was inducted in to the A&M Hall of Fame in 1991. In the 1969 NFL/AFL draft, he was picked by the Baltimore Colts in the second round (51st overall). He helped the Colts win Super Bowl V against the Dallas Cowboys as a cornerback. He is the Founder of COACHES OUTREACH, a national Christian ministry to coaches and their wives. Maxwell played 6 years in the NFL for the Oakland Raiders (John Madden) and Houston Oilers (Bum Phillips). A neck injury ended his career.

== Professional career ==
Maxwell was selected in the second round of the 1969 NFL draft by the Baltimore Colts. He helped the Colts beat the Dallas Cowboys in Super Bowl V as a cornerback. Tommy also played for the Oakland Raiders (John Madden-'71-73) and Houston Oilers (Bum Phillips- '74). A career-ending neck injury forced Maxwell to retire after the 1974 season.
