= Bill McClard =

American football player (born 1950)

No. 10, 19
- Position: Placekicker

Personal information
- Born: October 15, 1949 (age 77); Purcell, Oklahoma, U.S.
- Listed height: 5 ft 10 in (1.78 m)
- Listed weight: 202 lb (92 kg)

Career information
- High school: Norman (OK)
- College: Arkansas
- NFL draft: 1972: 3rd round, 61st overall pick

Career history
- San Diego Chargers (1972); New Orleans Saints (1973–1975)

Awards and highlights
- 2× First-team All-American (1970, 1971)

Career NFL statistics
- Field goals: 26
- Field goal attempts: 51
- Field goal %: 51
- Field goal long: 52
- Stats at Pro Football Reference

Bill W. McClard (born October 15, 1950) is an American former professional football player who was a placekicker in the National Football League (NFL). He played college football for the Arkansas Razorbacks, where he was named American Football Coaches Association All-America after the 1970 season and by The Sporting News in 1971. He kicked a then-NCAA record 60-yard field goal in 1970. This was only about one week before Tom Dempsey, with his half-foot, kicked the first 60+-yard field goal in the NFL. Both were responsible for changes in rules regarding returning field goal attempts.

Out of college, McClard was selected in the third round of the 1972 NFL draft by the San Diego Chargers. He played one year for the Chargers, kicking two field goals during his rookie season. For the next three seasons, McClard played for the New Orleans Saints, where he was successful on 26 of 51 field goal attempts and 31 of 32 extra points.

Since retiring from football, McClard has been a commercial real estate broker in Rogers, Arkansas.
