= Charlie Coffey =

American football player and coach (1934–2015)

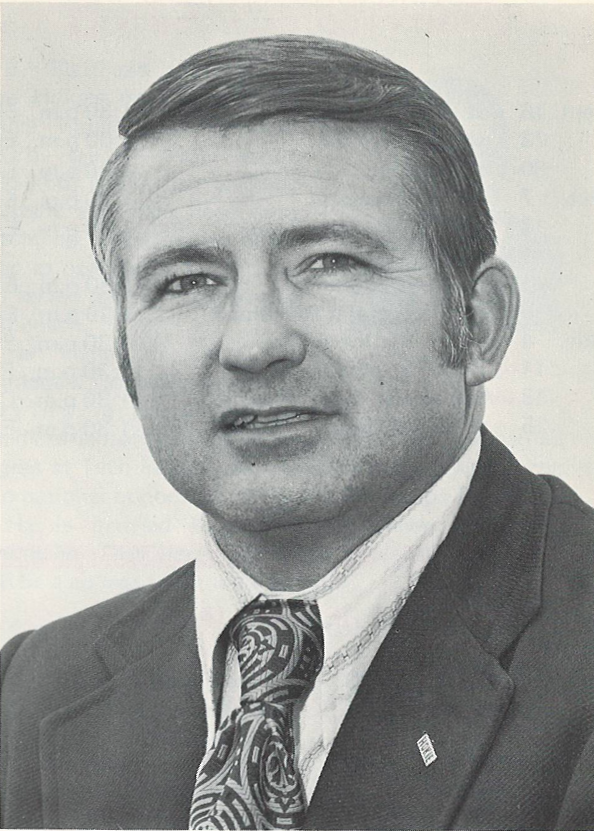
- Coffey, c. 1972

Biographical details
- Born: June 28, 1934; Bedford County, Tennessee, U.S.
- Died: August 24, 2015 (aged 81); Shelbyville, Tennessee, U.S.

Playing career
- 1953–1955: Tennessee
- Position(s): Guard

Coaching career (HC unless noted)
- ?: Hialeah HS (FL) (assistant)
- ?: Southeastern Louisiana (assistant)
- ?: George Washington (assistant)
- 1963–1965: Tennessee (DL)
- 1966–1970: Arkansas (DC)
- 1971–1973: Virginia Tech

Head coaching record
- Overall: 12–20–1

Charles Edward Coffey (June 28, 1934 – August 24, 2015) was an American football player and coach. A native of Shelbyville, Tennessee, Coffey attended the University of Tennessee to play football for Robert Neyland. While at the University of Tennessee he played guard, lettered from 1953 to 1955 and was selected as the team captain his senior year. Coffey also maintained the highest grade average for four years of any member of the UT squad. Coffey served as the head football coach at Virginia Tech from 1971 to 1973, compiling a record of 12–20–1.

== Coaching career ==
After graduating from the University of Tennessee, Coffey began his coaching career as an assistant football coach at Hialeah High School in Miami, Florida. Then he spent five years at Southeastern Louisiana University. His next move was to George Washington University in Washington D.C., and then back to his alma mater for two years coaching for Jim McDonald and Doug Dickey. He served as an assistant football coach at Tennessee, tutoring the defensive line from 1963 to 1965. In 1965, Coffey received an offer to join Frank Broyles' staff at the University of Arkansas as defensive coordinator. During that time, Coffey was earning a reputation as a strong leader and an excellent football coach. After five years coaching at Arkansas with Broyles, three schools tried to recruit Coffey for their head coach positions. The first school he visited was Virginia Tech and in 1971 without even visiting the other schools, he became their head football coach. Once he arrived in Blacksburg, Coffey established a potent passing attack, which resulted in Hokies quarterback Don Strock leading the nation in total passing and total offense in 1972. During his time in Blacksburg, he set the program awash in orange, made a whirlwind media tour of the state to promote the Virginia Tech football team and improved the athletic facilities. Most significantly, the new coach broke with Tech tradition and installed a pass-happy offense. Attendance at Virginia Tech football games increased to record breaking numbers. The highlight of the 1972 season came when Tech upset 19th-ranked Oklahoma State in Blacksburg. After completing his three-season tenure from 1971 to 1973, he compiled a 12–20–1 record. He was named to the Tennessee Sports Hall of Fame in 2010.

== Nationwide Express trucking ==
Coffey entered the trucking business in 1975. He founded Nationwide Express trucking company in 1980.

== Death ==
Coffey died at the age of 81, in his house in Shelbyville, Tennessee, on August 24, 2015.

== Head coaching record ==
Year	Team	Overall	Conference	Standing	Bowl/playoffs
Virginia Tech Gobblers (NCAA University Division / Division I independent) (1971–1973)
1971	Virginia Tech	4–7			
1972	Virginia Tech	6–4–1			
1973	Virginia Tech	2–9			
Virginia Tech:		12–20–1			
Total:		12–20–1			
