= Larry Stegent =

American football player (born 1947)

No. 35
- Position: Running back

Personal information
- Born: December 1, 1947 (age 78); Houston, Texas, U.S.
- Listed height: 6 ft 1 in (1.85 m)
- Listed weight: 200 lb (91 kg)

Career information
- High school: St. Thomas (Houston)
- College: Texas A&M (1966-1969)
- NFL draft: 1970: 1st round, 8th overall pick

Career history
- St. Louis Cardinals (1970–1971)

Awards and highlights
- First-team All-SWC (1969)

Career NFL statistics
- Receptions: 1
- Receiving yards: 12
- Stats at Pro Football Reference

Larry Stegent (born December 1, 1947) is an American former professional American football player who was a running back for the St. Louis Cardinals National Football League (NFL) in 1971. He lettered in four sports, including football, at St. Thomas High School in Houston, Texas from which he graduated in 1966, and to whose Sports Hall of Fame he was named in 2003. Although highly touted during his collegiate career for the Texas A&M Aggies, where he was a three-time all-Southwest Conference tailback who played on A&M's 1968 Cotton Bowl championship team with future New Orleans Saints quarterback Edd Hargett, he proved to be a disappointment in the NFL (owing in part to a knee injury in his first and only preseason game) as he only played in seven games, recording just one reception for 12 yards.

Larry lives with his wife of 55–56 years, Patricia McConn Stegent (Bebe), in Houston, Texas. They have 4 children, Tammy, Michael, Jason and John Casey. He is the CEO of Stegent Insurance Associates for 44 years. He is a life member of The Million Dollar Round Table and past member of The Top Of The Table.
