= 1970 Cincinnati Bearcats football team =

American college football season

1970 Cincinnati Bearcats football
- Conference: Independent
- Record: 7–4
- Head coach: Ray Callahan (2nd season)
- Captains: Bob Bell; Mark Mercurio; Earl Wilson
- Home stadium: Nippert Stadium; Riverfront Stadium

1970 NCAA University Division independents football records
	Conf.			Overall
Team	W	L	T	W		L		T
No. 2 Notre Dame		–		10	–	1	–	0
Villanova		–		9	–	2	–	0
No. 16 Air Force		–		9	–	3	–	0
No. 13 Georgia Tech		–		9	–	3	–	0
Boston College		–		8	–	2	–	0
No. 19 Houston		–		8	–	3	–	0
West Virginia		–		8	–	3	–	0
No. 17 Tulane		–		8	–	4	–	0
No. 18 Penn State		–		7	–	3	–	0
West Texas State		–		7	–	3	–	0
Cincinnati		–		7	–	4	–	0
Florida State		–		7	–	4	–	0
Virginia Tech		–		5	–	6	–	0
Syracuse		–		6	–	4	–	0
Dayton		–		5	–	4	–	1
Pittsburgh		–		5	–	5	–	0
Rutgers		–		5	–	5	–	0
Utah State		–		5	–	5	–	0
Colgate		–		5	–	6	–	0
Southern Miss		–		5	–	6	–	0
New Mexico State		–		4	–	6	–	0
Miami (FL)		–		3	–	8	–	0
Northern Illinois		–		3	–	7	–	0
Marshall		–		3	–	6	–	0
Buffalo		–		2	–	9	–	0
Navy		–		2	–	9	–	0
Army		–		1	–	9	–	1
Xavier		–		1	–	9	–	0
Holy Cross		–		0	–	10	–	1
Rankings from AP Poll

The 1970 Cincinnati Bearcats football team represented University of Cincinnati as an independent during the 1970 NCAA University Division football season. Led by second-year head coach Ray Callahan, the Bearcats compiled a record of 7–4. The team played home games at Nippert Stadium in Cincinnati.

== Schedule ==
Date	Time	Opponent	Site	Result	Attendance	Source
September 12	2:30 p.m.	at Tulsa	Skelly Stadium; Tulsa, OK	L 3–7	17,500	
September 19	7:45 p.m.	Dayton	Riverfront Stadium; Cincinnati, OH	W 13–7	19,781	
September 26	1:30 p.m.	at William & Mary	Cary Field; Williamsburg, VA	W 17–10	7,000	
October 2	8:00 p.m.	Tulane	Nippert Stadium; Cincinnati, OH	L 3–6	11,324	
October 10	8:00 p.m.	Xavier	Nippert Stadium; Cincinnati, OH (rivalry)	W 42–0	15,573	
October 24	1:30 p.m.	Ohio	Nippert Stadium; Cincinnati, OH	W 29–21	14,947	
October 31	2:38 p.m.	at Wichita State	Cessna Stadium; Wichita, KS	W 35–5	27,210–27,610	
November 7	3:00 p.m.	at North Texas State	Fouts Field; Denton, TX	W 30–10	15,500	
November 14	1:30 p.m.	Louisville	Nippert Stadium; Cincinnati, OH (The Keg of Nails)	L 14–28	4,000	
November 21	1:30 p.m.	Miami (OH)	Nippert Stadium; Cincinnati, OH (Victory Bell)	W 33–0	10,164	
November 28		at Memphis State	Memphis Memorial Stadium; Memphis, TN (rivalry)	L 10–14	8,734	
All times are in Eastern time

== Roster ==
1970 Cincinnati Bearcats football team roster
Players
Coaches
Offense

Pos.	#	Name	Class
TE	80	Ernest Arnold	So
QB	10	Dave Brickler	So
QB	11	Al Johnson	Jr
QB	12	Bill Carter	So
OT	76	Steve Collett	So
FB	31	Brent Cook	Sr
FB	34	Mike Cousins	Jr

Defense

Pos.	#	Name	Class
DB	24	Butch Alberts	Jr
DT	72	Bob Bell	Sr
DE	85	Ed Bolis	So
DT	74	Ron Bryant	Jr

Special teams

Pos.	#	Name	Class
K	75	Clark Chambers	So

Head coach

- Ray Callahan

Coordinators/assistant coaches

Legend

- (C) Team captain
- (S) Suspended
- (I) Ineligible
- Injured
- Redshirt

== Game films ==
- 1970 Cincinnati - Miami (Oh) Football Game Film, Reel 1. UC in white and visitors on scoreboard in their home stadium.
- 1970 Cincinnati - Miami (Oh) Football Game Film, Reel 2. UC in white and visitors on scoreboard in their home stadium.
- 1970 Cincinnati - Ohio U Football Game Film
