= 1970 Rutgers Scarlet Knights football team =

American college football season

1970 Rutgers Scarlet Knights football
- Conference: Independent
- Record: 5–5
- Head coach: John F. Bateman (11th season)
- Captains: Michael Yancheff; Michael Pellowski
- Home stadium: Rutgers Stadium

1970 NCAA University Division independents football records
	Conf.			Overall
Team	W	L	T	W		L		T
No. 2 Notre Dame		–		10	–	1	–	0
Villanova		–		9	–	2	–	0
No. 16 Air Force		–		9	–	3	–	0
No. 13 Georgia Tech		–		9	–	3	–	0
Boston College		–		8	–	2	–	0
No. 19 Houston		–		8	–	3	–	0
West Virginia		–		8	–	3	–	0
No. 17 Tulane		–		8	–	4	–	0
No. 18 Penn State		–		7	–	3	–	0
West Texas State		–		7	–	3	–	0
Cincinnati		–		7	–	4	–	0
Florida State		–		7	–	4	–	0
Virginia Tech		–		5	–	6	–	0
Syracuse		–		6	–	4	–	0
Dayton		–		5	–	4	–	1
Pittsburgh		–		5	–	5	–	0
Rutgers		–		5	–	5	–	0
Utah State		–		5	–	5	–	0
Colgate		–		5	–	6	–	0
Southern Miss		–		5	–	6	–	0
New Mexico State		–		4	–	6	–	0
Miami (FL)		–		3	–	8	–	0
Northern Illinois		–		3	–	7	–	0
Marshall		–		3	–	6	–	0
Buffalo		–		2	–	9	–	0
Navy		–		2	–	9	–	0
Army		–		1	–	9	–	1
Xavier		–		1	–	9	–	0
Holy Cross		–		0	–	10	–	1
Rankings from AP Poll

The 1970 Rutgers Scarlet Knights football team represented Rutgers University as an independent during the 1970 NCAA University Division football season. In their 11th season under head coach John F. Bateman, the Scarlet Knights compiled a 5–5 record and were outscored by their opponents 215 to 193. The team's statistical leaders included Mike Yancheff with 974 passing yards, Larry Robertson with 397 rushing yards, and Al Fenstemacher with 254 receiving yards.

The Scarlet Knights played their home games at Rutgers Stadium in Piscataway, New Jersey, across the river from the university's main campus in New Brunswick.

== Schedule ==
Date	Opponent	Site	Result	Attendance	Source
September 19	Lafayette	Rutgers Stadium; Piscataway, NJ (Middle Three)	W 41–16	13,000	
September 26	at Princeton	Palmer Stadium; Princeton, NJ (rivalry)	L 14–41	32,000	
October 3	at Harvard	Harvard Stadium; Boston, MA	L 9–39	12,000	
October 10	at Lehigh	Taylor Stadium; Bethlehem, PA (Middle Three)	L 0–7	12,000	
October 17	No. 7 Delaware^{†}	Rutgers Stadium; Piscataway, NJ	L 21–51	16,500	
October 24	at Columbia	Baker Field; New York, NY	L 14–30	16,713	
October 31	Bucknell	Rutgers Stadium; Piscataway, NJ	W 21–7	7,500	
November 7	at Boston University	Nickerson Field; Boston, MA	W 6–3	7,514	
November 14	Holy Cross	Rutgers Stadium; Piscataway, NJ	W 37–7	10,500	
November 21	Colgate	Rutgers Stadium; Piscataway, NJ	W 30–14	11,500	
^{†}Homecoming; Rankings from AP Poll released prior to the game

== Roster ==
1970 Rutgers Scarlet Knights football team roster
Players
Coaches
Offense

Pos.	#	Name	Class
OT	75	John Bauer	Sr
OT	66	Doug Campbell	Sr
FB	22	Bill Donaldson	Jr
QB	10	Leo Gasienica	So
QB	15	Mike Yancheff	Sr

Defense

Pos.	#	Name	Class
S	26	Sam Chapman	Sr
DT	70	Kevin O'Connor	Sr
DE	81	Mike Pellowski	Sr

Special teams

Pos.	#	Name	Class

Head coach

- John F. Bateman

Coordinators/assistant coaches

Legend

- (C) Team captain
- (S) Suspended
- (I) Ineligible
- Injured
- Redshirt
