= 1970 Penn State Nittany Lions football team =

American college football season

1970 Penn State Nittany Lions football
- Conference: Independent

Ranking
- Coaches: No. 19
- AP: No. 18
- Record: 7–3
- Head coach: Joe Paterno (5th season)
- Offensive scheme: I formation
- Defensive coordinator: Jim O'Hora (5th season)
- Base defense: 4–3
- Captains: Jack Ham; Warren Koegel
- Home stadium: Beaver Stadium

1970 NCAA University Division independents football records
	Conf.			Overall
Team	W	L	T	W		L		T
No. 2 Notre Dame		–		10	–	1	–	0
Villanova		–		9	–	2	–	0
No. 16 Air Force		–		9	–	3	–	0
No. 13 Georgia Tech		–		9	–	3	–	0
Boston College		–		8	–	2	–	0
No. 19 Houston		–		8	–	3	–	0
West Virginia		–		8	–	3	–	0
No. 17 Tulane		–		8	–	4	–	0
No. 18 Penn State		–		7	–	3	–	0
West Texas State		–		7	–	3	–	0
Cincinnati		–		7	–	4	–	0
Florida State		–		7	–	4	–	0
Virginia Tech		–		5	–	6	–	0
Syracuse		–		6	–	4	–	0
Dayton		–		5	–	4	–	1
Pittsburgh		–		5	–	5	–	0
Rutgers		–		5	–	5	–	0
Utah State		–		5	–	5	–	0
Colgate		–		5	–	6	–	0
Southern Miss		–		5	–	6	–	0
New Mexico State		–		4	–	6	–	0
Miami (FL)		–		3	–	8	–	0
Northern Illinois		–		3	–	7	–	0
Marshall		–		3	–	6	–	0
Buffalo		–		2	–	9	–	0
Navy		–		2	–	9	–	0
Army		–		1	–	9	–	1
Xavier		–		1	–	9	–	0
Holy Cross		–		0	–	10	–	1
Rankings from AP Poll

The 1970 Penn State Nittany Lions football team represented the Pennsylvania State University as an independent during the 1970 NCAA University Division football season. Led by fifth-year head coach Joe Paterno, the Nittany Lions compiled a record of 7–3. Penn State played home games at Beaver Stadium in University Park, Pennsylvania.

The Nittany Lions entered the season with a 22-game winning streak, unbeaten (29–0–1) in their last thirty games. By mid-season, they had dropped three (including one at home), then won the last five to finish at 7–3 and climbed to No. 18 in the final AP poll.

== Schedule ==
Date	Time	Opponent	Rank	Site	TV	Result	Attendance	Source
September 19	1:35 p.m.	Navy	No. 7	Beaver Stadium; University Park, PA		W 55–7	48,566	
September 26		at No. 18 Colorado	No. 4	Folsom Field; Boulder, CO	ABC	L 13–41	42,850	
October 3		at Wisconsin	No. 16	Camp Randall Stadium; Madison, WI		L 16–29	55,204	
October 10		at Boston College		Alumni Stadium; Chestnut Hill, MA		W 28–3	25,222	
October 17		Syracuse^{†}		Beaver Stadium; University Park, PA (rivalry)		L 7–24	50,540	
October 24	1:55 p.m.	at Army		Michie Stadium; West Point, NY	ABC	W 38–14	41,062	
October 31		West Virginia		Beaver Stadium; University Park, PA (rivalry)		W 42–8	49,932	
November 7		at Maryland		Byrd Stadium; College Park, MD (rivalry)		W 34–0	23,400	
November 14	1:30 p.m.	Ohio		Beaver Stadium; University Park, PA		W 32–22	43,000	
November 21		Pittsburgh	No. 20	Beaver Stadium; University Park, PA (rivalry)		W 35–15	50,017	
^{†}Homecoming; Rankings from AP Poll released prior to the game; All times are in Eastern time

== Roster ==
Notable players included senior linebacker Jack Ham and junior running backs Lydell Mitchell and Franco Harris.

1970 Penn State Nittany Lions football team roster
Players
Coaches
Offense

Pos.	#	Name	Class
QB	25	Mike Cooper	Sr
WR	88	Greg Edmonds	Sr
FB	42	Fran Ganter	Sr
RB	34	Franco Harris	Jr
G	67	Bob Holuba	Sr
QB	16	John Hufnagel	So
TE	89	John Hull	Jr
OT	70	Dave Joyner	Jr
C	56	Warren Koegel (C)	Sr
OT	73	Craig Lyle	So
TE	86	Jim McCord	Sr
RB	23	Lydell Mitchell	Jr
RB	46	Joel Ramich	Sr
G	69	Carl Schaukowitch	So
WR	84	Scott Skarzynski	So
OT	78	Vic Surma	Sr

Defense

Pos.	#	Name	Class
LB	44	Charlie Adams	Sr
DT	79	Frank Ahrenhold	Jr
DE	93	Jack Aumiller	Jr
DE	83	Bruce Bannon	So
DT	37	Rick Brown	So
LB	33	Jack Ham (C)	Sr
DT	72	Jim Heller	So
LB	80	Gary Hull	Sr
LB	15	Mark Koiwai	Sr
LB	47	Jim Laslavic	So
DE	82	Wayne Munson	So
DE	81	John Skorupan	So
DB	10	Mike Smith	Sr
LB	36	Jim Trent	So
DB	19	John Trent	So
S	41	Charlie Wilson	Sr
LB	60	Charlie Zapiec	Sr

Special teams

Pos.	#	Name	Class
P/QB	13	Bob Parsons	Jr
LB/PK/P	80	Gary Hull	Sr

Head coach

- Joe Paterno (5th year)

Coordinators/assistant coaches

- John Chuckran
- Jim O'Hora
- Frank Patrick
- Bob Phillips
- Jerry Sandusky
- Jim Weaver
- George Welsh
- J. T. White

Legend

- (C) Team captain
- (S) Suspended
- (I) Ineligible
- Injured
- Redshirt

Roster

== NFL draft ==
Four Nittany Lions were selected in the 1971 NFL draft.

Round	Pick	Overall	Name	Position	Team
2nd	8	34	Jack Ham	Linebacker	Pittsburgh Steelers
3rd	21	73	Warren Koegel	Center	Oakland Raiders
11th	22	282	Vic Surma	Wide receiver	Miami Dolphins
16th	24	414	Greg Edmonds	Wide receiver/Tight end	Minnesota Vikings
