= 1970 Ohio Bobcats football team =

American college football season

1970 Ohio Bobcats football
- Conference: Mid-American Conference
- Record: 4–5 (3–2 MAC)
- Head coach: Bill Hess (13th season)
- Home stadium: Peden Stadium

1970 Mid-American Conference football standings
	Conf.					Overall
Team	W		L		T	W		L		T
No. 12 Toledo $	5	–	0	–	0	12	–	0	–	0
Miami (OH)	3	–	2	–	0	7	–	3	–	0
Ohio	3	–	2	–	0	4	–	5	–	0
Western Michigan	2	–	3	–	0	7	–	3	–	0
Kent State	1	–	4	–	0	3	–	7	–	0
Bowling Green	1	–	4	–	0	2	–	6	–	1
$ – Conference champion; Rankings from AP Poll

The 1970 Ohio Bobcats football team was an American football team that represented Ohio University in the Mid-American Conference (MAC) during the 1970 NCAA University Division football season. In their 13th season under head coach Bill Hess, the Bobcats compiled a 4–5 record (3–2 against MAC opponents), finished in a tie for second place, and were outscored by all opponents by a combined total of 261 to 178. They played their home games in Peden Stadium in Athens, Ohio.

The team's game against Marshall, scheduled for November 21, was canceled in the aftermath of the Southern Airways Flight 932 crash on November 14 that killed 37 members of the opposing team.

== Schedule ==
Date	Time	Opponent	Site	Result	Attendance	Source
September 19		at Kent State	Memorial Stadium; Kent, OH	W 24–14	14,500	
September 26	2:32 p.m.	at Minnesota*	Memorial Stadium; Minneapolis, MN	L 7–49	39,593	
October 3	1:30 p.m.	Toledo	Peden Stadium; Athens, OH	L 7–42	16,800	
October 10	1:30 p.m.	Dayton*^{†}	Peden Stadium; Athens, OH	W 17–14	12,100	
October 17	1:30 p.m.	Miami (OH)	Peden Stadium; Athens, OH (rivalry)	W 23–22	17,100	
October 24	1:30 p.m.	at Cincinnati*	Nippert Stadium; Cincinnati, OH	L 21–29	14,947	
October 31	1:30 p.m.	at Western Michigan	Waldo Stadium; Kalamazoo, MI	L 23–52	12,500	
November 7	1:32 p.m.	at Bowling Green	Doyt Perry Stadium; Bowling Green, OH	W 34–7	12,153	
November 14	1:30 p.m.	at Penn State*	Beaver Stadium; University Park, PA	L 22–32	43,000	
*Non-conference game; ^{†}Homecoming; All times are in Eastern time
