= 1970 Xavier Musketeers football team =

American college football season

1970 Xavier Musketeers football
- Conference: Independent
- Record: 1–9
- Head coach: Dick Selcer (1st season)
- Home stadium: Xavier Stadium

1970 NCAA University Division independents football records
	Conf.			Overall
Team	W	L	T	W		L		T
No. 2 Notre Dame		–		10	–	1	–	0
Villanova		–		9	–	2	–	0
No. 16 Air Force		–		9	–	3	–	0
No. 13 Georgia Tech		–		9	–	3	–	0
Boston College		–		8	–	2	–	0
No. 19 Houston		–		8	–	3	–	0
West Virginia		–		8	–	3	–	0
No. 17 Tulane		–		8	–	4	–	0
No. 18 Penn State		–		7	–	3	–	0
West Texas State		–		7	–	3	–	0
Cincinnati		–		7	–	4	–	0
Florida State		–		7	–	4	–	0
Virginia Tech		–		5	–	6	–	0
Syracuse		–		6	–	4	–	0
Dayton		–		5	–	4	–	1
Pittsburgh		–		5	–	5	–	0
Rutgers		–		5	–	5	–	0
Utah State		–		5	–	5	–	0
Colgate		–		5	–	6	–	0
Southern Miss		–		5	–	6	–	0
New Mexico State		–		4	–	6	–	0
Miami (FL)		–		3	–	8	–	0
Northern Illinois		–		3	–	7	–	0
Marshall		–		3	–	6	–	0
Buffalo		–		2	–	9	–	0
Navy		–		2	–	9	–	0
Army		–		1	–	9	–	1
Xavier		–		1	–	9	–	0
Holy Cross		–		0	–	10	–	1
Rankings from AP Poll

The 1970 Xavier Musketeers football team was an American football team that represented Xavier University as an independent during the 1970 NCAA University Division football season. In their first year under head coach Dick Selcer, the Musketeers compiled a 1–9 record.

== Schedule ==
Date	Time	Opponent	Site	Result	Attendance	Source
September 12	8:00 p.m.	at Dayton	Baujan Field; Dayton, OH	L 22–45	12,338	
September 19	4:30 p.m.	vs. Miami (OH)	Riverfront Stadium; Cincinnati, OH	L 7–28	19,871–22,000	
September 26	8:00 p.m.	Northern Illinois	Corcoran Stadium; Cincinnati, OH	L 0–18	3,645	
October 3	8:00 p.m.	Marshall	Corcoran Stadium; Cincinnati, OH	L 14–31	6,535	
October 10	8:00 p.m.	at Cincinnati	Nippert Stadium; Cincinnati, OH (rivalry)	L 0–42	15,573	
October 17	2:00 p.m.	Temple	Corcoran Stadium; Cincinnati, OH	L 15–28	6,851	
October 24	8:00 p.m.	at Tampa	Tampa Stadium; Tampa, FL	L 10–33	19,123–19,132	
October 31	1:30 p.m.	at Villanova	Villanova Stadium; Villanova, PA	L 14–42	10,012	
November 7		Quantico Marines	Corcoran Stadium; Cincinnati, OH	W 35–27		
November 21		at Kent State	Memorial Stadium; Kent, OH	L 6–34	2,321	
All times are in Eastern time
