= 1970 Army Cadets football team =

American college football season

1970 Army Cadets football
- Conference: Independent
- Record: 1–9–1
- Head coach: Tom Cahill (5th season)
- Defensive coordinator: Richard S. Lyon (4th season)
- Captain: Ken Wyrick
- Home stadium: Michie Stadium

1970 NCAA University Division independents football records
	Conf.			Overall
Team	W	L	T	W		L		T
No. 2 Notre Dame		–		10	–	1	–	0
Villanova		–		9	–	2	–	0
No. 16 Air Force		–		9	–	3	–	0
No. 13 Georgia Tech		–		9	–	3	–	0
Boston College		–		8	–	2	–	0
No. 19 Houston		–		8	–	3	–	0
West Virginia		–		8	–	3	–	0
No. 17 Tulane		–		8	–	4	–	0
No. 18 Penn State		–		7	–	3	–	0
West Texas State		–		7	–	3	–	0
Cincinnati		–		7	–	4	–	0
Florida State		–		7	–	4	–	0
Virginia Tech		–		5	–	6	–	0
Syracuse		–		6	–	4	–	0
Dayton		–		5	–	4	–	1
Pittsburgh		–		5	–	5	–	0
Rutgers		–		5	–	5	–	0
Utah State		–		5	–	5	–	0
Colgate		–		5	–	6	–	0
Southern Miss		–		5	–	6	–	0
New Mexico State		–		4	–	6	–	0
Miami (FL)		–		3	–	8	–	0
Northern Illinois		–		3	–	7	–	0
Marshall		–		3	–	6	–	0
Buffalo		–		2	–	9	–	0
Navy		–		2	–	9	–	0
Army		–		1	–	9	–	1
Xavier		–		1	–	9	–	0
Holy Cross		–		0	–	10	–	1
Rankings from AP Poll

The 1970 Army Cadets football team represented the United States Military Academy as an independent during the 1970 NCAA University Division football season. In their fifth year under head coach Tom Cahill, the Cadets compiled a 1–9–1 record and were outscored by their opponents by a combined total of 281 to 151. In the annual Army–Navy Game, the Cadets were defeated by the Midshipmen 11-7. The Cadets' only victory came in the season opener, a 26 to 0 victory over Holy Cross.

No Army players were selected as first-team players on the 1970 College Football All-America Team.

== Schedule ==
Date	Time	Opponent	Site	TV	Result	Attendance	Source
September 12	2:00 p.m.	Holy Cross	Michie Stadium; West Point, NY		W 26–0	31,666	
September 19	2:00 p.m.	Baylor	Michie Stadium; West Point, NY		L 7–10	36,539	
September 26	2:30 p.m.	at Nebraska	Memorial Stadium; Lincoln, NE		L 0–28	66,928	
October 3		at Tennessee	Neyland Stadium; Knoxville, TN		L 3–48	59,817	
October 10	1:30 p.m.	at Notre Dame	Notre Dame Stadium; Notre Dame, IN (rivalry)		L 10–51	59,075	
October 17		at Virginia	Scott Stadium; Charlottesville, VA		L 20–21	29,100	
October 24	1:55 p.m.	Penn State	Michie Stadium; West Point, NY	ABC	L 14–38	41,062	
October 31	1:30 p.m.	at Boston College	Alumni Stadium; Chestnut Hill, MA		L 13–21	25,350	
November 7	2:00 p.m.	No. 20 Syracuse	Michie Stadium; West Point, NY		L 29–31	41,062	
November 14	2:02 p.m.	No. 19 Oregon	Michie Stadium; West Point, NY		T 22–22	39,455	
November 28	1:21 p.m.	vs. Navy	John F. Kennedy Stadium; Philadelphia, PA (Army–Navy Game)		L 7–11	95,151	
Rankings from AP Poll released prior to the game; All times are in Eastern time

== Roster ==
1970 Army Cadets football team roster
Players
Coaches
Offense

Pos.	#	Name	Class
WR	80	Joe Albano
QB	18	Dick Atha
C	50	Wes Blaine
TE	87	Ed Francis
WR	30	Mike Gaines
RB	44	Bob Hines
OT	75	Bob Johnson
RB	38	Rick Jones
TE	85	Mike Masciello
QB	16	Bob Mohn
RB	46	Ray Ritacco
RB		Bill Roden
G	61	Steve Scales
TE	81	John Simar
RB	23	Bruce Simpson
WR	43	Dusty Triplett
G	63	Gregg True
OT	64	Paul Watkins
C	55	Cliff Volz
QB	10	Bernie Wall
OT	70	Jim Walter

Defense

Pos.	#	Name	Class
DE	83	Bob Bishop
LB	29	Chuck Blakley
DL	86	Steve Bogosian
DB	21	Jim Bryan
LB	54	Bob Coonan
LB	56	Don MacLean
DB	27	Lane Morehead
DE	93	Tom Rini
DE	91	John Roth
DB		Danton Smith
DT	60	Dave Smith
LB	58	Bob Souza
DB	25	Randy Stein
LB	53	Gary Topping
DB	20	Matt Wotell
DT	52	Ken Wyrick

Special teams

Pos.	#	Name	Class

Head coach

- Tom Cahill

Coordinators/assistant coaches

Legend

- (C) Team captain
- (S) Suspended
- (I) Ineligible
- Injured
- Redshirt
