= 1970 Air Force Falcons football team =

American college football season

1970 Air Force Falcons football
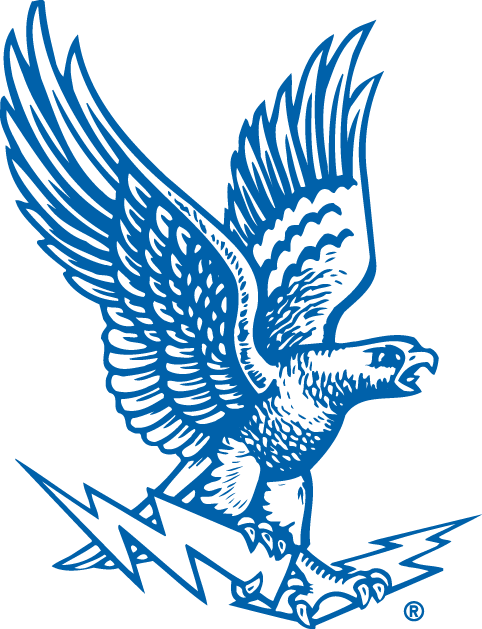

Sugar Bowl, L 13–34 vs. Tennessee
- Conference: Independent

Ranking
- Coaches: No. 11
- AP: No. 16
- Record: 9–3
- Head coach: Ben Martin (13th season)
- Captains: Cyd Maattala; Virgil Staponski
- Home stadium: Falcon Stadium

1970 NCAA University Division independents football records
| | Conf. | | | Overall |
| Team | W | L | T | W | | L | | T |
|---|---|---|---|---|---|---|---|---|
| No. 2 Notre Dame | | – | | 10 | – | 1 | – | 0 |
| Villanova | | – | | 9 | – | 2 | – | 0 |
| No. 16 Air Force | | – | | 9 | – | 3 | – | 0 |
| No. 13 Georgia Tech | | – | | 9 | – | 3 | – | 0 |
| Boston College | | – | | 8 | – | 2 | – | 0 |
| No. 19 Houston | | – | | 8 | – | 3 | – | 0 |
| West Virginia | | – | | 8 | – | 3 | – | 0 |
| No. 17 Tulane | | – | | 8 | – | 4 | – | 0 |
| No. 18 Penn State | | – | | 7 | – | 3 | – | 0 |
| West Texas State | | – | | 7 | – | 3 | – | 0 |
| Cincinnati | | – | | 7 | – | 4 | – | 0 |
| Florida State | | – | | 7 | – | 4 | – | 0 |
| Virginia Tech | | – | | 5 | – | 6 | – | 0 |
| Syracuse | | – | | 6 | – | 4 | – | 0 |
| Dayton | | – | | 5 | – | 4 | – | 1 |
| Pittsburgh | | – | | 5 | – | 5 | – | 0 |
| Rutgers | | – | | 5 | – | 5 | – | 0 |
| Utah State | | – | | 5 | – | 5 | – | 0 |
| Colgate | | – | | 5 | – | 6 | – | 0 |
| Southern Miss | | – | | 5 | – | 6 | – | 0 |
| New Mexico State | | – | | 4 | – | 6 | – | 0 |
| Miami (FL) | | – | | 3 | – | 8 | – | 0 |
| Northern Illinois | | – | | 3 | – | 7 | – | 0 |
| Marshall | | – | | 3 | – | 6 | – | 0 |
| Buffalo | | – | | 2 | – | 9 | – | 0 |
| Navy | | – | | 2 | – | 9 | – | 0 |
| Army | | – | | 1 | – | 9 | – | 1 |
| Xavier | | – | | 1 | – | 9 | – | 0 |
| Holy Cross | | – | | 0 | – | 10 | – | 1 |
Rankings from AP Poll

The 1970 Air Force Falcons football team represented the United States Air Force Academy as an independent during the 1970 NCAA University Division football season. Led by thirteenth-year head coach Ben Martin, the Falcons compiled a record of 9–3, outscored their opponents 366–239, and finished No. 16 in the AP Poll. They won their first eight games and were ranked seventh in the AP Poll for three weeks. Air Force played their home games at Falcon Stadium in Colorado Springs, Colorado.

This was the last season that Army was off of the Falcons' schedule; the Commander-in-Chief's Trophy was introduced two years later which matched the three academies annually. Previously, Air Force played Army in odd years and Navy in even years.

Quarterback Bob Parker led the nation's major-college football players in passing yards (2,789), pass completions (199), and pass attempts (402), and ranked second in passing touchdowns (21). Parker's favorite receiver Ernie Jennings (74 receptions for 1289 yards). The Falcons' notable wins were over No. 9 Missouri, and No. 6 Stanford, led by Heisman Trophy winner Jim Plunkett. Stanford went on to upset No. 2 Ohio State in the Rose Bowl.

For the first time in seven seasons, the Falcons appeared in a bowl game, but lost by 21 points to No. 4 Tennessee in the Sugar Bowl in New Orleans on New Year's Day. The favored Volunteers jumped out to a 24–0 lead in the first quarter and the Falcons could not make up the difference. Through the 2021 season, this is the Falcons' most recent appearance in a major bowl game.

== Schedule ==
| Date | Time | Opponent | Rank | Site | TV | Result | Attendance | Source |
|---|---|---|---|---|---|---|---|---|
| September 12 | 1:30 p.m. | Idaho | | Falcon Stadium; Colorado Springs, CO | | W 45–7 | 22,279–25,000 | |
| September 19 | 1:30 p.m. | at Wyoming | | War Memorial Stadium; Laramie, WY | | W 41–17 | 24,541 | |
| September 26 | | at No. 9 Missouri | No. 20 | Busch Memorial Stadium; St. Louis, MO | | W 37–14 | 43,118 | |
| October 3 | 1:30 p.m. | Colorado State | No. 10 | Falcon Stadium; Colorado Springs, CO (rivalry) | | W 37–22 | 29,030 | |
| October 10 | 1:29 p.m. | Tulane | No. 8 | Falcon Stadium; Colorado Springs, CO | | W 24–3 | 31,508 | |
| October 17 | 12:00 p.m. | vs. Navy | No. 7 | RFK Stadium; Washington, DC (rivalry) | | W 26–3 | 46,414 | |
| October 24 | 1:31 p.m. | Boston College | No. 7 | Falcon Stadium; Colorado Springs, CO | | W 35–10 | 38,032 | |
| October 31 | 2:30 p.m. | at Arizona | No. 7 | Arizona Stadium; Tucson, AZ | | W 23–20 | 36,000 | |
| November 7 | 2:30 p.m. | at Oregon | No. 9 | Autzen Stadium; Eugene, OR | | L 35–46 | 24,700 | |
| November 14 | 1:00 p.m. | No. 6 Stanford | No. 13 | Falcon Stadium; Colorado Springs, CO | | W 31–14 | 41,638 | |
| November 21 | 1:00 p.m. | Colorado | No. 10 | Falcon Stadium; Colorado Springs, CO | | L 19–49 | 45,447 | |
| January 1, 1971 | | vs. No. 4 Tennessee | No. 11 | Tulane Stadium; New Orleans, LA (Sugar Bowl) | ABC | L 13–34 | 78,655 | |
Rankings from AP Poll released prior to the game; All times are in Mountain time

== Roster ==
1970 Air Force Falcons football team roster
Players
Coaches
Offense

| Pos. | # | Name | Class |
|---|---|---|---|
| RB | | Brian Bream | Jr |
| WR | 22 | Ernie Jennings | Sr |
| C | 58 | Orderia Mitchell | So |

Defense

| Pos. | # | Name | Class |
|---|---|---|---|
| DL | 70 | Eugene Ogilvie | So |

Special teams

| Pos. | # | Name | Class |

Head coach

- Ben Martin (13th year)

Coordinators/assistant coaches

Legend

- (C) Team captain
- (S) Suspended
- (I) Ineligible
- Injured
- Redshirt

== NFL draft ==
The following Falcon was selected in the 1970 NFL draft following the season.

| Round | Pick | Player | Position | NFL team |
|---|---|---|---|---|
| 10 | 257 | Ernie Jennings | Wide receiver | San Francisco 49ers |
