= 1970 West Texas State Buffaloes football team =

American college football season

1970 West Texas State Buffaloes football
- Conference: Independent
- Record: 7–3
- Head coach: Joe Kerbel (11th season)
- Home stadium: Buffalo Bowl

1970 NCAA University Division independents football records
	Conf.			Overall
Team	W	L	T	W		L		T
No. 2 Notre Dame		–		10	–	1	–	0
Villanova		–		9	–	2	–	0
No. 16 Air Force		–		9	–	3	–	0
No. 13 Georgia Tech		–		9	–	3	–	0
Boston College		–		8	–	2	–	0
No. 19 Houston		–		8	–	3	–	0
West Virginia		–		8	–	3	–	0
No. 17 Tulane		–		8	–	4	–	0
No. 18 Penn State		–		7	–	3	–	0
West Texas State		–		7	–	3	–	0
Cincinnati		–		7	–	4	–	0
Florida State		–		7	–	4	–	0
Virginia Tech		–		5	–	6	–	0
Syracuse		–		6	–	4	–	0
Dayton		–		5	–	4	–	1
Pittsburgh		–		5	–	5	–	0
Rutgers		–		5	–	5	–	0
Utah State		–		5	–	5	–	0
Colgate		–		5	–	6	–	0
Southern Miss		–		5	–	6	–	0
New Mexico State		–		4	–	6	–	0
Miami (FL)		–		3	–	8	–	0
Northern Illinois		–		3	–	7	–	0
Marshall		–		3	–	6	–	0
Buffalo		–		2	–	9	–	0
Navy		–		2	–	9	–	0
Army		–		1	–	9	–	1
Xavier		–		1	–	9	–	0
Holy Cross		–		0	–	10	–	1
Rankings from AP Poll

The 1970 West Texas State Buffaloes football team represented West Texas State University (now known as West Texas A&M University) as an independent during the 1970 NCAA University Division football season. In their 11th season under head coach Joe Kerbel, the Buffaloes compiled a 7–3 record. West Texas State played home games at the Buffalo Bowl in Canyon, Texas.

== Schedule ==
Date	Time	Opponent	Site	Result	Attendance	Source
September 19	7:30 p.m.	at Lamar Tech	Cardinal Stadium; Beaumont, TX	L 28–33	14,217	
September 26	8:00 p.m.	Wichita State	Buffalo Bowl; Canyon, TX	W 43–0	14,000	
October 3	8:00 p.m.	East Carolina	Buffalo Bowl; Canyon, TX	W 42–30	11,000	
October 10	7:30 p.m.	at Northern Illinois	Huskie Stadium; DeKalb, IL	W 24–22	9,591	
October 17	8:00 p.m.	North Texas State	Buffalo Bowl; Canyon, TX	L 10–11	14,000	
October 24	8:00 p.m.	New Mexico State	Buffalo Bowl; Canyon, TX	W 37–7	11,500	
October 31	8:00 p.m.	at UT Arlington	Turnpike Stadium; Arlington, TX	W 33–8	4,200	
November 7	2:00 p.m.	Western Michigan	Buffalo Bowl; Canyon, TX	L 0–20	10,005–10,500	
November 14	12:30 p.m.	at Bowling Green	Doyt Perry Stadium; Bowling Green, OH	W 23–7	6,682	
November 21	2:00 p.m.	Southern Miss	Buffalo Bowl; Canyon, TX	W 14–11	5,291–12,000	
All times are in Central time
