= 1970 Utah State Aggies football team =

American college football season

1970 Utah State Aggies football
- Conference: Independent
- Record: 5–5
- Head coach: Chuck Mills (4th season)
- Home stadium: Romney Stadium

1970 NCAA University Division independents football records
	Conf.			Overall
Team	W	L	T	W		L		T
No. 2 Notre Dame		–		10	–	1	–	0
Villanova		–		9	–	2	–	0
No. 16 Air Force		–		9	–	3	–	0
No. 13 Georgia Tech		–		9	–	3	–	0
Boston College		–		8	–	2	–	0
No. 19 Houston		–		8	–	3	–	0
West Virginia		–		8	–	3	–	0
No. 17 Tulane		–		8	–	4	–	0
No. 18 Penn State		–		7	–	3	–	0
West Texas State		–		7	–	3	–	0
Cincinnati		–		7	–	4	–	0
Florida State		–		7	–	4	–	0
Virginia Tech		–		5	–	6	–	0
Syracuse		–		6	–	4	–	0
Dayton		–		5	–	4	–	1
Pittsburgh		–		5	–	5	–	0
Rutgers		–		5	–	5	–	0
Utah State		–		5	–	5	–	0
Colgate		–		5	–	6	–	0
Southern Miss		–		5	–	6	–	0
New Mexico State		–		4	–	6	–	0
Miami (FL)		–		3	–	8	–	0
Northern Illinois		–		3	–	7	–	0
Marshall		–		3	–	6	–	0
Buffalo		–		2	–	9	–	0
Navy		–		2	–	9	–	0
Army		–		1	–	9	–	1
Xavier		–		1	–	9	–	0
Holy Cross		–		0	–	10	–	1
Rankings from AP Poll

The 1970 Utah State Aggies football team represented Utah State University in the 1970 NCAA University Division football season as independent. Led by fourth-year head coach Chuck Mills, the team played their home games at Romney Stadium in Logan, Utah. The team completed the season with a 5–5 record, which was shortened by one game from what was originally scheduled; the game against Wichita State on October 3 was canceled after one of their charter aircraft crashed in Colorado en route to Utah the day before, killing many of their starting players and coaching staff.

== Schedule ==
Date	Time	Opponent	Site	Result	Attendance	Source
September 12		at No. 14 Kansas State	KSU Stadium; Manhattan, KS	L 0–37	35,000	
September 19	1:30 p.m.	Bowling Green	Romney Stadium; Logan, UT	W 33–14	8,327	
September 26		at Wyoming	War Memorial Stadium; Laramie, WY (rivalry)	W 42–29	21,177	
October 3		Wichita State	Romney Stadium; Logan, UT	Cancelled		
October 10		at Kentucky	McLean Stadium; Lexington, KY	W 35–6	33,000	
October 24		at BYU	Cougar Stadium; Provo, UT (rivalry)	L 20–27	21,562	
October 31		at Colorado State	Hughes Stadium; Fort Collins, CO	L 13–20	20,156	
November 7		Utah	Romney Stadium; Logan, UT (Battle of the Brothers)	L 0–17	13,865	
November 14		Idaho	Romney Stadium; Logan, UT	L 14–42	9,285	
November 21		at Memphis State	Memphis Memorial Stadium; Memphis, TN	W 15–12	13,136	
November 28		at New Mexico State	Memorial Stadium; Las Cruces, NM	W 45–21	4,750	
Rankings from AP Poll released prior to the game; All times are in Mountain time

== Roster ==
1970 Utah State Aggies football team roster
Players
Coaches
Offense

Pos.	#	Name	Class
QB	11	Tony Adams	So
WR	42	Bob Wicks	Sr

Defense

Pos.	#	Name	Class
DT	85	Bill Dunstan	Sr

Special teams

Pos.	#	Name	Class

Head coach

- Chuck Mills

Coordinators/assistant coaches

Legend

- (C) Team captain
- (S) Suspended
- (I) Ineligible
- Injured
- Redshirt
