= 1970 Toledo Rockets football team =

American college football season

1970 Toledo Rockets football

MAC champion Tangerine Bowl champion

Tangerine Bowl, W 40–12 vs. William & Mary
- Conference: Mid-American Conference

Ranking
- Coaches: No. 17
- AP: No. 12
- Record: 12–0 (5–0 MAC)
- Head coach: Frank Lauterbur (8th season)
- Offensive coordinator: Dave Hardy (3rd season)
- Defensive coordinator: Dick Strahm (1st season)
- Captains: Tom Duncan; Tony Harris
- Home stadium: Glass Bowl

1970 Mid-American Conference football standings
	Conf.					Overall
Team	W		L		T	W		L		T
No. 12 Toledo $	5	–	0	–	0	12	–	0	–	0
Miami (OH)	3	–	2	–	0	7	–	3	–	0
Ohio	3	–	2	–	0	4	–	5	–	0
Western Michigan	2	–	3	–	0	7	–	3	–	0
Kent State	1	–	4	–	0	3	–	7	–	0
Bowling Green	1	–	4	–	0	2	–	6	–	1
$ – Conference champion; Rankings from AP Poll

The 1970 Toledo Rockets football team was an American football team that represented the University of Toledo in the Mid-American Conference (MAC) during the 1970 NCAA University Division football season. In their eighth and final season under head coach Frank Lauterbur, the Rockets compiled a 12–0 record, outscored all opponents by a combined total of 384 to 88, and won the MAC championship. The season ended with a 40–12 victory over Southern Conference champion William & Mary in the 1970 Tangerine Bowl. The Rockets were ranked No. 12 in the final AP Poll and No. 17 in the final UPI Poll. After the Tangerine Bowl, William & Mary head coach Lou Holtz said, "Toledo can play football with anyone – that includes teams like Ohio State and Texas."

The 1970 season was part of a 35-game winning streak that consisted of three consecutive seasons from 1969 through 1971. During the streak, Toledo won three consecutive MAC championships and three consecutive bowl games, led the nation in total defense all three years, and outscored opponents by a combined total of 1,152 to 344. It remains the second longest winning streak in modern Division I-A college football history behind Oklahoma's 47-game streak in the 1950s.

The defense led the way for the 1970 team, allowing 104.8 rushing yards, 185.8 total yards, 3.7 turnovers forced, and 7.3 points per game. In a game against Dayton, Toledo allowed only 44 yards of total offense, zero rushing first downs, and zero passing yards, each of which remains a program record. In a 52–3 victory over Marshall, the team forced seven turnovers.

Defensive tackle Mel Long was selected as a first-team All-American by the Newspaper Enterprise Association. Eleven Toledo players received first-team All-MAC honors: Mel Long, quarterback Chuck Ealey, fullback Charlie Cole, end Don Fair, offensive guard Bob Caverly, offensive tackle Ken Wilson, defensive end Bob Rose, linebacker John Niezgoda, middle guard Steve Schnitkey, and defensive backs Tom Duncan and Gary Hinkson.

For the second consecutive year, Chuck Ealey was named MAC Back of the Year, and Frank Lauterbur was named MAC Coach of the Year. Mel Long was also named MAC Lineman of the Year. Ken Crots, who converted six of 18 field goal attempts, Ealey also won the Jim Nicholson Award as the player contributing the most to the team's success. The team captains were Tom Duncan and Tony Harris.

The team's statistical leaders included Chuck Ealey with 2,026 passing yards, Charles Cole with 774 rushing yards, Don Fair with 949 receiving yards, Tom Duncan with 76 points scored, Steve Schnitkey with 178 tackles, and Gary Hinkson with seven interceptions.

The Rockets played their home game in the Glass Bowl. The attendance at six home games was 93,120, an average of 15,520 per game.

One day before the Rockets' appearance in the Tangerine Bowl, Frank Lauterbur confirmed a leak that he was leaving the program to become the head football coach at Iowa. Lauterbur compiled a 48–32–2 record in eight seasons at Toledo.

== Schedule ==
Date	Time	Opponent	Rank	Site	Result	Attendance	Source
September 12	8:00 p.m.	East Carolina*		Glass Bowl; Toledo, OH	W 35–2	14,106	
September 19	1:30 p.m.	at Buffalo*		Rotary Field; Buffalo, NY	W 27–6	7,789	
September 26	8:00 p.m.	Marshall*		Glass Bowl; Toledo, OH	W 52–3	12,804	
October 3	1:30 p.m.	at Ohio		Peden Stadium; Athens, OH	W 42–7	16,800	
October 10	8:00 p.m.	Bowling Green		Glass Bowl; Toledo, OH (rivalry)	W 20–0	21,123	
October 17	1:31 p.m.	at Western Michigan		Waldo Stadium; Kalamazoo, MI	W 20–0	23,200	
October 24		at Kent State	No. T–19	Dix Stadium; Kent, OH	W 34–17	8,019	
October 31	1:30 p.m.	Miami (OH)		Glass Bowl; Toledo, OH	W 14–13	18,439	
November 7		Northern Illinois*	No. 15	Glass Bowl; Toledo, OH	W 45–7	12,127	
November 14	1:30 p.m.	at Dayton*	No. 16	Baujan Field; Dayton, OH	W 31–7	7,163	
November 21	8:00 p.m.	Colorado State*	No. 15	Glass Bowl; Toledo, OH	W 24–14	14,521	
December 28		vs. William & Mary*	No. 15	Tangerine Bowl; Orlando, FL (Tangerine Bowl)	W 40–12	15,664	
*Non-conference game; Rankings from AP Poll released prior to the game; All times are in Eastern time

== Roster ==
1970 Toledo Rockets football team roster
Players			Coaches
Offense: Pos. / # / Name / Class; QB / 16 / Chuck Ealey / Jr	Defense: Pos. / # / Name / Class; DT / 77 / Mel Long / Jr	Special teams: Pos. / # / Name / Class	Head coach: Frank Lauterbur; Coordinators/assistant coaches: Dave Hardy – Offensive coordinator; Sil Cornachione – Offensive backs; Charlie Snyder – Wide receivers; Dick Strahm – Defensive coordinator; Don Lewis – Defensive ends/linebackers; Jim Flynn – Defensive backs; Legend: (C) Team captain; (S) Suspended; (I) Ineligible; Injured; Redshirt

== After the season ==
=== NFL draft ===
The following Rockets were selected in the 1971 NFL draft following the season.

Round	Pick	Player	Position	NFL club
4	101	Tony Harris	Running back	San Francisco 49ers
15	369	Charles Cole	Running back	Buffalo Bills
