= 1970 Miami Hurricanes football team =

American college football season

1970 Miami Hurricanes football
- Conference: Independent
- Record: 3–8
- Head coach: Charlie Tate (7th season; first 2 games); Walt Kichefski (interim, final 9 games)
- MVP: Tom Turchetta
- Home stadium: Miami Orange Bowl

1970 NCAA University Division independents football records
	Conf.			Overall
Team	W	L	T	W		L		T
No. 2 Notre Dame		–		10	–	1	–	0
Villanova		–		9	–	2	–	0
No. 16 Air Force		–		9	–	3	–	0
No. 13 Georgia Tech		–		9	–	3	–	0
Boston College		–		8	–	2	–	0
No. 19 Houston		–		8	–	3	–	0
West Virginia		–		8	–	3	–	0
No. 17 Tulane		–		8	–	4	–	0
No. 18 Penn State		–		7	–	3	–	0
West Texas State		–		7	–	3	–	0
Cincinnati		–		7	–	4	–	0
Florida State		–		7	–	4	–	0
Virginia Tech		–		5	–	6	–	0
Syracuse		–		6	–	4	–	0
Dayton		–		5	–	4	–	1
Pittsburgh		–		5	–	5	–	0
Rutgers		–		5	–	5	–	0
Utah State		–		5	–	5	–	0
Colgate		–		5	–	6	–	0
Southern Miss		–		5	–	6	–	0
New Mexico State		–		4	–	6	–	0
Miami (FL)		–		3	–	8	–	0
Northern Illinois		–		3	–	7	–	0
Marshall		–		3	–	6	–	0
Buffalo		–		2	–	9	–	0
Navy		–		2	–	9	–	0
Army		–		1	–	9	–	1
Xavier		–		1	–	9	–	0
Holy Cross		–		0	–	10	–	1
Rankings from AP Poll

The 1970 Miami Hurricanes football team represented the University of Miami as an independent during the 1970 NCAA University Division football season. The Hurricanes played their home games at the Miami Orange Bowl in Miami, Florida. The team was led by seventh-year head coach Charlie Tate until he resigned after the first two games of the season. Walt Kichefski took over as interim head coach for the remainder of the season. Miami finish with a record of 3–8.

== Schedule ==
Date	Time	Opponent	Site	TV	Result	Attendance	Source
September 18	8:06 p.m.	William & Mary	Miami Orange Bowl; Miami, FL		W 36–14	27,286	
September 26	2:00 p.m.	at No. 19 Georgia Tech	Grant Field; Atlanta, GA		L 21–31	44,246	
October 2	8:15 p.m.	Maryland	Miami Orange Bowl; Miami, FL		W 18–11	30,190	
October 16	8:15 p.m.	No. 5 (small) Tampa	Miami Orange Bowl; Miami, FL		L 14–31	30,213	
October 24	1:28 p.m.	at No. 18 Pittsburgh	Pitt Stadium; Pittsburgh, PA		L 17–28	28,415	
October 30		Florida State	Miami Orange Bowl; Miami, FL (rivalry)		L 3–27	24,168	
November 7	8:30 p.m.	at Tulane	Tulane Stadium; New Orleans, LA		L 16–31	23,250	
November 14		Alabama	Miami Orange Bowl; Miami, FL		L 8–32	25,469	
November 21	1:30 p.m.	at Syracuse	Archbold Stadium; Syracuse, NY		L 16–56	20,570	
November 28		Florida	Florida Field; Gainesville, FL (rivalry)		W 14–13	50,149	
December 5	9:40 p.m.	Houston	Miami Orange Bowl; Miami, FL	ABC	L 3–36	17,798	
Rankings from AP Poll released prior to the game; All times are in Eastern time

== Roster ==
1970 Miami Hurricanes football team roster
Players
Coaches
Offense

Pos.	#	Name	Class
QB	16	Kelly Cochrane	Jr
QB	17	David Teal	Sr
QB	18	John Hornibrook	So
WR	19	Don Brennan	Jr
RB	32	Chuck Foreman	So
RB	40	Bobby Best	Sr
RB	49	Tom Sullivan	Jr
C	50	Stan Bujalski	So
G	54	Jay Wilson	Jr
C	55	Jeff Anderson	So
C	58	Tom Turchetta	Jr
G	60	Garry Vujanov	So
OT	67	Andrew Dorn	Jr
OT	72	Maurice Kelly	So
OT	71	Wiley Matthews	Jr
WR	80	Dieter Matthes	Jr
TE	83	John Watson	So
WR	85	Burgess Owens	So
WR	87	Bruce Bishop	So
WR	88	Joe Schmidt	Sr

Defense

Pos.	#	Name	Class
DB	12	Kurt Schottenheimer	Sr
DB	13	Tony Stawarz	Sr
DB	20	Buddy Scarborough	Jr
DB	21	Jim Haviland	Jr
DB	28	Jerry Maynard	Jr
DB	22	Gary Mick	Jr
DB	23	Dean Stone	Sr
DE	53	Jack Chauvet	Sr
DT	56	Ken White	So
DE	63	Dan Johnson	Jr
LB	70	Jack Hendrickson	Jr
DT	75	Dick Trower	So
DT	77	Bob Trocolor	Sr
DE	78	Mike Barnes	So
DT	79	Ray Terzynski	Jr
LB	90	Mike Riley	Jr
LB	91	Al Palewicz	Jr
LB	94	John Barlow	So
LB	96	Bo Dunn	So

Special teams

Pos.	#	Name	Class
P	29	Pat Barrett	Sr
PK	44	Mike Cummins	Jr

Head coach

- Charlie Tate

Coordinators/assistant coaches

Legend

- (C) Team captain
- (S) Suspended
- (I) Ineligible
- Injured
- Redshirt
