= 1970 Tulane Green Wave football team =

American college football season

1970 Tulane Green Wave football

Liberty Bowl champion

Liberty Bowl, W 17–3 vs. Colorado
- Conference: Independent

Ranking
- AP: No. 17
- Record: 8–4
- Head coach: Jim Pittman (5th season)
- Home stadium: Tulane Stadium

1970 NCAA University Division independents football records
	Conf.			Overall
Team	W	L	T	W		L		T
No. 2 Notre Dame		–		10	–	1	–	0
Villanova		–		9	–	2	–	0
No. 16 Air Force		–		9	–	3	–	0
No. 13 Georgia Tech		–		9	–	3	–	0
Boston College		–		8	–	2	–	0
No. 19 Houston		–		8	–	3	–	0
West Virginia		–		8	–	3	–	0
No. 17 Tulane		–		8	–	4	–	0
No. 18 Penn State		–		7	–	3	–	0
West Texas State		–		7	–	3	–	0
Cincinnati		–		7	–	4	–	0
Florida State		–		7	–	4	–	0
Virginia Tech		–		5	–	6	–	0
Syracuse		–		6	–	4	–	0
Dayton		–		5	–	4	–	1
Pittsburgh		–		5	–	5	–	0
Rutgers		–		5	–	5	–	0
Utah State		–		5	–	5	–	0
Colgate		–		5	–	6	–	0
Southern Miss		–		5	–	6	–	0
New Mexico State		–		4	–	6	–	0
Miami (FL)		–		3	–	8	–	0
Northern Illinois		–		3	–	7	–	0
Marshall		–		3	–	6	–	0
Buffalo		–		2	–	9	–	0
Navy		–		2	–	9	–	0
Army		–		1	–	9	–	1
Xavier		–		1	–	9	–	0
Holy Cross		–		0	–	10	–	1
Rankings from AP Poll

The 1970 Tulane Green Wave football team was an American football team that represented Tulane University as an independent during the 1970 NCAA University Division football season. In its fifth year under head coach Jim Pittman, Tulane compiled an 8–4 record, defeated Colorado in the Liberty Bowl, and outscored opponents by a total of 179 to 157.

The team gained an average of 119.3 rushing yards and 123.5 passing yards per game. On defense, it gave up an average of 109.4 rushing yards and 98.7 passing yards per game. Tulane's individual statistical leaders included quarterback Mike Walker with 1,038 passing yards, David Abercrombie with 993 rushing yards, and Steve Barrios with 505 receiving yards.

The team played its home games at Tulane Stadium in New Orleans.

== Schedule ==
Date	Time	Opponent	Site	TV	Result	Attendance	Source
September 12		at Texas Tech	Jones Stadium; Lubbock, TX		L 14–21	42,250	
September 19		No. 19 Georgia	Tulane Stadium; New Orleans, LA		W 17–14	30,924	
September 26		at Illinois	Memorial Stadium; Champaign, IL		W 23–9	27,864	
October 2	7:00 p.m.	at Cincinnati	Nippert Stadium; Cincinnati, OH		W 6–3	11,324	
October 10	2:29 p.m.	at No. 8 Air Force	Falcon Stadium; Colorado Springs, CO		L 3–24	31,508	
October 17		North Carolina	Tulane Stadium; New Orleans, LA		W 24–17	23,900	
October 24		at Georgia Tech	Grant Field; Atlanta, GA		L 6–20	32,129	
October 31		at Vanderbilt	Dudley Field; Nashville, TN		W 10–7	19,000	
November 7	7:30 p.m.	Miami (FL)	Tulane Stadium; New Orleans, LA		W 31–16	23,250	
November 21		NC State	Tulane Stadium; New Orleans, LA		W 31–0	19,542	
November 28		No. 6 LSU	Tulane Stadium; New Orleans, LA (Battle for the Rag)		L 14–26	81,233	
December 12		vs. Colorado	Memphis Memorial Stadium; Memphis, TN (Liberty Bowl)	ABC	W 17–3	44,640	
Rankings from AP Poll released prior to the game; All times are in Central time

== Roster ==
1970 Tulane Green Wave football team roster
Players
Coaches
Offense

Pos.	#	Name	Class
RB	11	David Abercrombie	Sr
WR	29	Steve Barrios	Jr
OT	69	Rob Foley	So
QB	10	Greg Gleason	Jr
OT	78	Jeff Hollingsworth	So
QB	17	Rusty Lachaussee	Jr
C	50	Jim Thompson	Jr
G	60	Steve Thomas	Jr
QB	16	Mike Walker	So

Defense

Pos.	#	Name	Class
DB	23	Joe Bullard	Jr
DE	81	Bryan Duck	Sr
S	13	Paul Ellis	Jr
LB	39	Bruce Grimes	So
DT	57	Joel Hale	Jr
DB	33	David Hebert	Jr
LB	50	Ray Hester	Sr
LB	32	Rick Kingrea	Sr
DE	80	Rusty Lee	So
DE	82	Steve Stark	Sr
DE	77	Mike Walker	Sr

Special teams

Pos.	#	Name	Class

Head coach

- Jim Pittman

Coordinators/assistant coaches

Legend

- (C) Team captain
- (S) Suspended
- (I) Ineligible
- Injured
- Redshirt
