= 1970 Houston Cougars football team =

American college football season

1970 Houston Cougars football
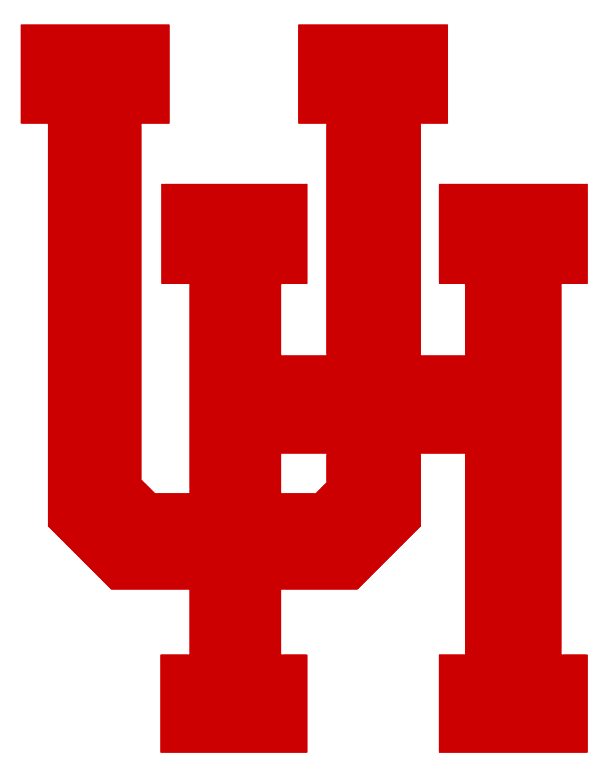
- Conference: Independent

Ranking
- Coaches: No. 13
- AP: No. 19
- Record: 8–3
- Head coach: Bill Yeoman (9th season)
- Offensive scheme: Veer–T
- Defensive coordinator: Melvin Robertson (6th season)
- Captains: Craig Robinson; Charlie Hall; Richard Harrington
- Home stadium: Houston Astrodome

1970 NCAA University Division independents football records
	Conf.			Overall
Team	W	L	T	W		L		T
No. 2 Notre Dame		–		10	–	1	–	0
Villanova		–		9	–	2	–	0
No. 16 Air Force		–		9	–	3	–	0
No. 13 Georgia Tech		–		9	–	3	–	0
Boston College		–		8	–	2	–	0
No. 19 Houston		–		8	–	3	–	0
West Virginia		–		8	–	3	–	0
No. 17 Tulane		–		8	–	4	–	0
No. 18 Penn State		–		7	–	3	–	0
West Texas State		–		7	–	3	–	0
Cincinnati		–		7	–	4	–	0
Florida State		–		7	–	4	–	0
Virginia Tech		–		5	–	6	–	0
Syracuse		–		6	–	4	–	0
Dayton		–		5	–	4	–	1
Pittsburgh		–		5	–	5	–	0
Rutgers		–		5	–	5	–	0
Utah State		–		5	–	5	–	0
Colgate		–		5	–	6	–	0
Southern Miss		–		5	–	6	–	0
New Mexico State		–		4	–	6	–	0
Miami (FL)		–		3	–	8	–	0
Northern Illinois		–		3	–	7	–	0
Marshall		–		3	–	6	–	0
Buffalo		–		2	–	9	–	0
Navy		–		2	–	9	–	0
Army		–		1	–	9	–	1
Xavier		–		1	–	9	–	0
Holy Cross		–		0	–	10	–	1
Rankings from AP Poll

The 1970 Houston Cougars football team was an American football team that represented the University of Houston as an independent during the 1970 NCAA University Division football season. In their ninth year under head coach Bill Yeoman, the team compiled a 8–3 record.

== Schedule ==
Date	Time	Opponent	Rank	Site	TV	Result	Attendance	Source
September 19		Syracuse	No. 15	Houston Astrodome; Houston, TX		W 42–15	40,439	
September 26		at Oklahoma State	No. 11	Lewis Field; Stillwater, OK		L 17–26	26,000	
October 10		at Mississippi State		Scott Field; Starkville, MS		W 31–14	28,000	
October 17		Oregon State	No. 19	Houston Astrodome; Houston, TX		W 19–16	37,791	
October 24		Alabama^{†}	No. 15	Houston Astrodome; Houston, TX		L 21–30	46,869	
October 31		Tulsa		Houston Astrodome; Houston, TX		W 21–9	34,119	
November 7		at No. 13 Ole Miss	No. 18	Hemingway Stadium; Oxford, MS		L 13–24	36,535	
November 14		Wyoming		Houston Astrodome; Houston, TX		W 28–0	26,987	
November 21		Wake Forest		Houston Astrodome; Houston, TX		W 26–2	28,569	
November 26		vs. Florida State		Tampa Stadium; Tampa, FL		W 53–21	18,053	
December 5	8:40 p.m.	at Miami (FL)		Orange Bowl; Miami, FL	ABC	W 36–3	17,798	
^{†}Homecoming; Rankings from AP Poll released prior to the game; All times are in Central time

== Game summaries ==
=== Ole Miss ===
#18 Houston Cougars at #13 Ole Miss Rebels

Quarter	1	2	3	4	Total
Houston	0	7	0	7	14
Ole Miss	14	0	3	7	24

at Hemingway Stadium, Oxford, Mississippi

- Date: November 7, 1970
- Game attendance: 36,535

Game information

First quarter

- MISS – Randy Reed 14-yard pass from Archie Manning (Jim Poole kick). Ole Miss 7–0. Drive: 9 plays, 83 yards.
- MISS – Bob Knight 5-yard pass from Archie Manning (Jim Poole kick). Ole Miss 14–0. Drive:

Second quarter

- HOU – Robert Newhouse 11-yard run (Carlos Lopez kick), 1:11. Ole Miss 14–7. Drive:

Third quarter

- MISS – Cloyce Hinton 58-yard field goal. Ole Miss 17–7. Drive:

Fourth quarter

- MISS – Vernon Studdard 3-yard pass from Shug Chumbler (Jim Poole kick). Ole Miss 24–7. Drive: 3 plays, 5 yards.
- HOU – touchdown (kick failed). Ole Miss 24–13. Drive:

Top passers

- HOU – Gerry Mullins – 7/23, 78 yards, 4 INT
- MISS –

Top rushers

- HOU – Robert Newhouse – 15 rushes, 148 yards, TD
- MISS –

Top receivers

- HOU –
- MISS –

== Roster ==
1970 Houston Cougars football team roster
Players
Coaches
Offense

Pos.	#	Name	Class
FB		Ted Heiskell
QB		Gary Mullins	Jr
RB		Tommy Mozisek
RB		Robert Newhouse	Jr
WR		Pat Orchin
WR		Elmo Wright	Sr

Defense

Pos.	#	Name	Class

Special teams

Pos.	#	Name	Class
K		Carlos Lopez

Head coach

- Bill Yeoman

Coordinators/assistant coaches

Legend

- (C) Team captain
- (S) Suspended
- (I) Ineligible
- Injured
- Redshirt
