= 1970 Villanova Wildcats football team =

American college football season

1970 Villanova Wildcats football
- Conference: Independent
- Record: 9–2
- Head coach: Lou Ferry (1st season)
- Captains: Joseph Belasco; William Brannan; John Well
- Home stadium: Villanova Stadium

1970 NCAA University Division independents football records
	Conf.			Overall
Team	W	L	T	W		L		T
No. 2 Notre Dame		–		10	–	1	–	0
Villanova		–		9	–	2	–	0
No. 16 Air Force		–		9	–	3	–	0
No. 13 Georgia Tech		–		9	–	3	–	0
Boston College		–		8	–	2	–	0
No. 19 Houston		–		8	–	3	–	0
West Virginia		–		8	–	3	–	0
No. 17 Tulane		–		8	–	4	–	0
No. 18 Penn State		–		7	–	3	–	0
West Texas State		–		7	–	3	–	0
Cincinnati		–		7	–	4	–	0
Florida State		–		7	–	4	–	0
Virginia Tech		–		5	–	6	–	0
Syracuse		–		6	–	4	–	0
Dayton		–		5	–	4	–	1
Pittsburgh		–		5	–	5	–	0
Rutgers		–		5	–	5	–	0
Utah State		–		5	–	5	–	0
Colgate		–		5	–	6	–	0
Southern Miss		–		5	–	6	–	0
New Mexico State		–		4	–	6	–	0
Miami (FL)		–		3	–	8	–	0
Northern Illinois		–		3	–	7	–	0
Marshall		–		3	–	6	–	0
Buffalo		–		2	–	9	–	0
Navy		–		2	–	9	–	0
Army		–		1	–	9	–	1
Xavier		–		1	–	9	–	0
Holy Cross		–		0	–	10	–	1
Rankings from AP Poll

The 1970 Villanova Wildcats football team represented the Villanova University during the 1970 NCAA University Division football season. The head coach was Lou Ferry, coaching his first season with the Wildcats. The team played their home games at Villanova Stadium in Villanova, Pennsylvania.

== Schedule ==
Date	Time	Opponent	Site	Result	Attendance	Source
September 12	1:30 p.m.	at Maryland	Byrd Stadium; College Park, MD	W 21–3	24,500	
September 19	1:55 p.m.	Boston College	Villanova Stadium; Villanova, PA	L 21–28	12,832	
September 26		at Santa Clara	Buck Shaw Stadium; Santa Clara, CA	W 37–16	10,437	
October 3		at No. 4 Delaware	Delaware Stadium; Newark, DE (rivalry)	W 34–31	19,067	
October 10	1:30 p.m.	at Buffalo	Rotary Field; Buffalo, NY	W 17–7	3,539	
October 24	1:30 p.m.	Holy Cross	Villanova Stadium; Villanova, PA	W 34–14	13,174	
October 31	1:30 p.m.	Xavier	Villanova Stadium; Villanova, PA	W 42–14	10,012	
November 7	1:30 p.m.	at Virginia Tech	Lane Stadium; Blacksburg, VA	L 7–34	16,000	
November 14	1:30 p.m.	at Navy	Navy–Marine Corps Memorial Stadium; Annapolis, MD	W 14–10	13,587	
November 21	1:30 p.m.	West Chester	Villanova Stadium; Villanova, PA	W 30–7	9,500–10,000	
November 26		at Temple	Temple Stadium; Philadelphia, PA	W 31–26	17,500	
Rankings from AP Poll released prior to the game; All times are in Eastern time

== Roster ==
1970 Villanova Wildcats football team roster
Players
Coaches
Offense

Pos.	#	Name	Class
WR	88	Mike Siani	Jr
TE	83	Bob Schaeffer	So
QB	15	Daryl Woodring	Jr

Defense

Pos.	#	Name	Class
LB	64	John Babinecz	Jr
DB	26	Dan O'Neil	Jr
LB	62	Mike Palmer	So
LB	46	Kevin Reilly	So

Special teams

Pos.	#	Name	Class

Head coach

- Lou Ferry

Coordinators/assistant coaches

Legend

- (C) Team captain
- (S) Suspended
- (I) Ineligible
- Injured
- Redshirt
