= 1970 Bowling Green Falcons football team =

American college football season

1970 Bowling Green Falcons football
- Conference: Mid-American Conference
- Record: 2–6–1 (1–4 MAC)
- Head coach: Don Nehlen (3rd season)
- Home stadium: Doyt Perry Stadium

1970 Mid-American Conference football standings
	Conf.					Overall
Team	W		L		T	W		L		T
No. 12 Toledo $	5	–	0	–	0	12	–	0	–	0
Miami (OH)	3	–	2	–	0	7	–	3	–	0
Ohio	3	–	2	–	0	4	–	5	–	0
Western Michigan	2	–	3	–	0	7	–	3	–	0
Kent State	1	–	4	–	0	3	–	7	–	0
Bowling Green	1	–	4	–	0	2	–	6	–	1
$ – Conference champion; Rankings from AP Poll

The 1970 Bowling Green Falcons football team was an American football team that represented Bowling Green University in the Mid-American Conference (MAC) during the 1970 NCAA University Division football season. In their third season under head coach Don Nehlen, the Falcons compiled a 2–6–1 record (1–4 against MAC opponents) and outscored their opponents by a combined total of 178 to 118.

The team's statistical leaders included Vern Wireman with 622 passing yards, Julius Livas with 279 rushing yards, and Bill Pittman with 235 receiving yards.

== Schedule ==
Date	Time	Opponent	Site	Result	Attendance	Source
September 19	3:30 p.m.	at Utah State*	Romney Stadium; Logan, UT	L 14–33	8,327	
September 26	1:30 p.m.	Dayton*	Doyt Perry Stadium; Bowling Green, OH	T 14–14	15,347	
October 3	1:30 p.m.	at Western Michigan	Waldo Stadium; Kalamazoo, MI	L 3–23	16,000	
October 10	8:00 p.m.	at Toledo	Glass Bowl; Toledo, OH (rivalry)	L 0–20	21,123	
October 17	1:30 p.m.	Kent State	Doyt Perry Stadium; Bowling Green, OH (rivalry)	W 44–0	16,670	
October 24		at Miami (OH)	Miami Field; Oxford, OH	L 3–7	13,212	
October 31	1:30 p.m.	Marshall*	Doyt Perry Stadium; Bowling Green, OH	W 26–24	16,073	
November 7	1:32 p.m.	Ohio	Doyt Perry Stadium; Bowling Green, OH	L 7–34	12,153	
November 14	1:30 p.m.	West Texas State*	Doyt Perry Stadium; Bowling Green, OH	L 7–23	6,682	
*Non-conference game; All times are in Eastern time
