= 1970 Syracuse Orangemen football team =

American college football season

1970 Syracuse Orangemen football
- Conference: Independent
- Record: 6–4
- Head coach: Ben Schwartzwalder (22nd season)
- Captains: Paul Paolisso; Raymond White; Randolph Zur
- Home stadium: Archbold Stadium

1970 NCAA University Division independents football records
	Conf.			Overall
Team	W	L	T	W		L		T
No. 2 Notre Dame		–		10	–	1	–	0
Villanova		–		9	–	2	–	0
No. 16 Air Force		–		9	–	3	–	0
No. 13 Georgia Tech		–		9	–	3	–	0
Boston College		–		8	–	2	–	0
No. 19 Houston		–		8	–	3	–	0
West Virginia		–		8	–	3	–	0
No. 17 Tulane		–		8	–	4	–	0
No. 18 Penn State		–		7	–	3	–	0
West Texas State		–		7	–	3	–	0
Cincinnati		–		7	–	4	–	0
Florida State		–		7	–	4	–	0
Virginia Tech		–		5	–	6	–	0
Syracuse		–		6	–	4	–	0
Dayton		–		5	–	4	–	1
Pittsburgh		–		5	–	5	–	0
Rutgers		–		5	–	5	–	0
Utah State		–		5	–	5	–	0
Colgate		–		5	–	6	–	0
Southern Miss		–		5	–	6	–	0
New Mexico State		–		4	–	6	–	0
Miami (FL)		–		3	–	8	–	0
Northern Illinois		–		3	–	7	–	0
Marshall		–		3	–	6	–	0
Buffalo		–		2	–	9	–	0
Navy		–		2	–	9	–	0
Army		–		1	–	9	–	1
Xavier		–		1	–	9	–	0
Holy Cross		–		0	–	10	–	1
Rankings from AP Poll

The 1970 Syracuse Orangemen football team represented Syracuse University as an independent during the 1970 NCAA University Division football season. The team was led by 22nd-year head coach Ben Schwartzwalder and played their home games at Archbold Stadium in Syracuse, New York. Syracuse finished with a record of 6–4 and were not invited to a bowl game.

The season was marred because the head coach and university's refusal to resolve issues of systemic racism brought forth by the Syracuse 8 and their protest boycott.

== Schedule ==
Date	Time	Opponent	Rank	Site	Result	Attendance	Source
September 19		at No. 15 Houston		Houston Astrodome; Houston, TX	L 15–42	40,439	
September 26		Kansas		Archbold Stadium; Syracuse, NY	L 14–31	25,000	
October 3		at Illinois		Memorial Stadium; Champaign, IL	L 0–27	39,357	
October 10		Maryland		Archbold Stadium; Syracuse, NY	W 23–7	19,872	
October 17		at Penn State		Beaver Stadium; University Park, PA (rivalry)	W 24–7	50,540	
October 24	1:30 p.m.	Navy		Archbold Stadium; Syracuse, NY	W 23–8	28,732	
October 31		No. 15 Pittsburgh		Archbold Stadium; Syracuse, NY (rivalry)	W 43–13	28,392	
November 7	2:00 p.m.	at Army	No. 20	Michie Stadium; West Point, NY	W 31–29	41,062	
November 14		at West Virginia		Mountaineer Field; Morgantown, WV (rivalry)	L 19–28	28,500	
November 21	1:30 p.m.	Miami (FL)		Archbold Stadium; Syracuse, NY	W 56–16	20,570	
Rankings from AP Poll released prior to the game; All times are in Eastern time

== Roster ==
1970 Syracuse Orangemen football team roster
Players
Coaches
Offense

Pos.	#	Name	Class
RB	36	Marty Januszkiewicz	Jr
OT	71	Stan Walters	Jr
OT	74	Dan Yochum	Jr

Defense

Pos.	#	Name	Class
DT	76	Joe Ehrmann	So
DB	12	Tom Myers	Jr

Special teams

Pos.	#	Name	Class
K	3	George Jakowenko	Sr

Head coach

- Ben Schwartzwalder

Coordinators/assistant coaches

Legend

- (C) Team captain
- (S) Suspended
- (I) Ineligible
- Injured
- Redshirt
