= 1970 Pittsburgh Panthers football team =

American college football season

1970 Pittsburgh Panthers football
- Conference: Independent
- Record: 5–5
- Head coach: Carl DePasqua (2nd season)
- Offensive coordinator: Lou Cecconi (2nd season)
- Home stadium: Pitt Stadium

1970 NCAA University Division independents football records
	Conf.			Overall
Team	W	L	T	W		L		T
No. 2 Notre Dame		–		10	–	1	–	0
Villanova		–		9	–	2	–	0
No. 16 Air Force		–		9	–	3	–	0
No. 13 Georgia Tech		–		9	–	3	–	0
Boston College		–		8	–	2	–	0
No. 19 Houston		–		8	–	3	–	0
West Virginia		–		8	–	3	–	0
No. 17 Tulane		–		8	–	4	–	0
No. 18 Penn State		–		7	–	3	–	0
West Texas State		–		7	–	3	–	0
Cincinnati		–		7	–	4	–	0
Florida State		–		7	–	4	–	0
Virginia Tech		–		5	–	6	–	0
Syracuse		–		6	–	4	–	0
Dayton		–		5	–	4	–	1
Pittsburgh		–		5	–	5	–	0
Rutgers		–		5	–	5	–	0
Utah State		–		5	–	5	–	0
Colgate		–		5	–	6	–	0
Southern Miss		–		5	–	6	–	0
New Mexico State		–		4	–	6	–	0
Miami (FL)		–		3	–	8	–	0
Northern Illinois		–		3	–	7	–	0
Marshall		–		3	–	6	–	0
Buffalo		–		2	–	9	–	0
Navy		–		2	–	9	–	0
Army		–		1	–	9	–	1
Xavier		–		1	–	9	–	0
Holy Cross		–		0	–	10	–	1
Rankings from AP Poll

The 1970 Pittsburgh Panthers football team represented the University of Pittsburgh as an independent during the 1970 NCAA University Division football season. The team compiled a 5–5 record in its second year under head coach Carl DePasqua, their best record since their #4 ranked 9–1 1963 squad. The team's statistical leaders included John Hogan with 801 passing yards and Tony Esposito with 623 rushing yards.

== Schedule ==
Date	Time	Opponent	Rank	Site	Result	Attendance	Source
September 19		No. 16 UCLA		Pitt Stadium; Pittsburgh, PA	L 15–24	33,889	
September 26		at Baylor		Baylor Stadium; Waco, TX	W 15–10	20,000	
October 3	1:33 p.m.	Kent State		Pitt Stadium; Pittsburgh, PA	W 27–6	20,038	
October 10	2:00 p.m.	at Navy		Navy–Marine Corps Memorial Stadium; Annapolis, MD	W 10–8	23,426	
October 17		West Virginia		Pitt Stadium; Pittsburgh, PA (Backyard Brawl)	W 36–35	44,479	
October 24	1:28 p.m.	Miami (FL)	No. 18	Pitt Stadium; Pittsburgh, PA	W 28–17	28,415	
October 31		at Syracuse	No. 15	Archbold Stadium; Syracuse, NY (rivalry)	L 13–43	28,392	
November 7		at No. 2 Notre Dame		Notre Dame Stadium; Notre Dame, IN (rivalry)	L 14–46	59,075	
November 14		Boston College		Pitt Stadium; Pittsburgh, PA	L 6–21	20,966	
November 21		No. 20 Penn State		Beaver Stadium; University Park, PA (rivalry)	L 15–35	50,017	
Rankings from AP Poll released prior to the game; All times are in Eastern time

== Roster ==
1970 Pittsburgh Panthers football team roster
Players
Coaches
Offense

Pos.	#	Name	Class
RB	45	Tony Esposito	Sr
RB	33	Dave Garnett	Sr
QB	12	Tom Hasbach	So
QB	10	John Hogan	Sr
C	52	Bob Kuziel	Jr

Defense

Pos.	#	Name	Class
LB	81	Bob Baierl	Sr
LB	44	Joe Carroll	Jr
LB	50	Ralph Cindrich	Jr
LB	21	Charlie Hall	Sr
DB	20	Bryant Salter	Sr

Special teams

Pos.	#	Name	Class

Head coach

- Carl DePasqua

Coordinators/assistant coaches

Legend

- (C) Team captain
- (S) Suspended
- (I) Ineligible
- Injured
- Redshirt
