= Bob Parker (American football) =

Profile
- Position: Quarterback

Personal information
- Born: c. 1949; West Covina, California, U.S.

Career information
- High school: Edgewood (West Covina, CA)
- College: Air Force (1969–1970)

Awards and highlights
- Led country in passing yards (1970)

Bob Parker (born c. 1949) is a former American football quarterback. He played college football for the Air Force Falcons in 1969 and 1970. He grew up in West Covina, California, where he attended Edgewood High School. At Air Force in 1970, he led the nation's major-college football players in passing yards (2,789), pass completions (199), and pass attempts (402), and ranked second in passing touchdowns (21). He led the 1970 Air Force Falcons football team to a 9–3 record and a berth in the Sugar Bowl. Parker's favorite receiver Ernie Jennings (74 receptions for 1289 yards) was a consensus All-American in 1970. He was also an Academic All-American and a National Football Foundation National Scholar Athlete in 1970.
