= 1970 Southern Miss Southerners football team =

American college football season

1970 Southern Miss Southerners football
- Conference: Independent
- Record: 5–6
- Head coach: P. W. Underwood (2nd season)
- Home stadium: Faulkner Field

1970 NCAA University Division independents football records
	Conf.			Overall
Team	W	L	T	W		L		T
No. 2 Notre Dame		–		10	–	1	–	0
Villanova		–		9	–	2	–	0
No. 16 Air Force		–		9	–	3	–	0
No. 13 Georgia Tech		–		9	–	3	–	0
Boston College		–		8	–	2	–	0
No. 19 Houston		–		8	–	3	–	0
West Virginia		–		8	–	3	–	0
No. 17 Tulane		–		8	–	4	–	0
No. 18 Penn State		–		7	–	3	–	0
West Texas State		–		7	–	3	–	0
Cincinnati		–		7	–	4	–	0
Florida State		–		7	–	4	–	0
Virginia Tech		–		5	–	6	–	0
Syracuse		–		6	–	4	–	0
Dayton		–		5	–	4	–	1
Pittsburgh		–		5	–	5	–	0
Rutgers		–		5	–	5	–	0
Utah State		–		5	–	5	–	0
Colgate		–		5	–	6	–	0
Southern Miss		–		5	–	6	–	0
New Mexico State		–		4	–	6	–	0
Miami (FL)		–		3	–	8	–	0
Northern Illinois		–		3	–	7	–	0
Marshall		–		3	–	6	–	0
Buffalo		–		2	–	9	–	0
Navy		–		2	–	9	–	0
Army		–		1	–	9	–	1
Xavier		–		1	–	9	–	0
Holy Cross		–		0	–	10	–	1
Rankings from AP Poll

The 1970 Southern Miss Southerners football team was an American football team that represented the University of Southern Mississippi as an independent during the 1970 NCAA University Division football season. In their second year under head coach P. W. Underwood, the team compiled a 5–6 record.

== Schedule ==
Date	Time	Opponent	Site	Result	Attendance	Source
September 12		at Southwestern Louisiana	McNaspy Stadium; Lafayette, LA	W 16–14	11,000	
September 19		at Auburn	Cliff Hare Stadium; Auburn, AL	L 14–33	48,500	
September 26		UT Arlington	Faulkner Field; Hattiesburg, MS	W 26–20	9,074–9,500	
October 3		Richmond	Faulkner Field; Hattiesburg, MS	W 43–21	9,422	
October 10		at San Diego State	San Diego Stadium; San Diego, CA	L 14–41	32,968	
October 17		at No. 4 Ole Miss	Hemingway Stadium; Oxford, MS	W 30–14	27,200	
October 24		at Mississippi State	Scott Field; Starkville, MS	L 15–51	33,000	
October 31		at Memphis State	Memphis Memorial Stadium; Memphis, TN (rivalry)	L 0–33	24,468	
November 14		Louisiana Tech^{†}	Faulkner Field; Hattiesburg, MS (rivalry)	L 6–27	12,800	
November 21	2:00 p.m.	at West Texas State	Buffalo Bowl; Canyon, TX	L 11–14	5,291–12,000	
November 28		Trinity (TX)	Faulkner Field; Hattiesburg, MS	W 53–31	5,000–7,000	
^{†}Homecoming; Rankings from AP Poll released prior to the game

== Upset of Ole Miss ==
On October 17, Southern Miss traveled to Oxford to face No. 4 Ole Miss and quarterback Archie Manning, a Heisman Trophy candidate. The Rebels were heavy favorites and started the game with a 7-0 lead. Southern tied the game on a 44-yard touchdown run by fullback Bill Foley, however, the Rebels regained the lead on a touchdown pass from Manning to tailback Randy Reed. Driving early in the second quarter, the Southerners had the ball fourth and two at the Rebel 11-yard line. With a fourth down Southern skipped the chance for a short field goal, coach P. W. Underwood called for a reverse by reserve tailback Willie Heidelburg, who raced around right end to tie the game. Ray Guy's 47-yard field goal gave the Southerners a 17-14 lead at halftime. Early in the second half, Southern again drove to the Rebel 11-yard line, and Underwood again called for a Heidelberg reverse. The result was the same. And Southern held a 23-14 lead after Guy missed the extra point. Minutes later Gerry Saggus returned a Rebel punt 60 yards for a touchdown, giving Southern a 30-14 lead with 5:45 left in the third quarter and would be the final score of the game. Southern had one of the biggest upsets of the 1970 college football season as well as one of the Greatest Games in Southern Miss Football.

Southern Mississippi, sparked by its quarterback, Rick Donegan, and hard-running backs, halted Archie Manning and his Mississippi team mates for a 30-14 upset over the fifth-ranked previously unbeaten Ole Rebels. Manning's touchdown passes were a 51-yard to Floyd Franks and a 22-yard to Randy Reed. The extra points were added by Jim Poole.

This was the Rebels' first home appearance of the season and the first game on their new, $278,000 artificial turf.

With the victory, Southern evened its won-lost record at 3-3. Donegan, a 165-pound junior, completed 14 of 30 passes for 116 yards and helped set up one touchdown with a 46-yard quarterback keeper. Manning hit on 30 of 56 passes for 341 yards.

Southern held a 17-14 lead at half-time. Southern initial touch down came on Foley's 44-yard run that culminated a 78-yard drive. The drive went 80 yards in seven plays in the second quarter for Southerns second score, with Heidelburg going over from 11 yards.

Heidelburg scored on another 11-yard run in the third period to cap a 68-yard drive, then Saggus made his long punt-return for the final score.

Ole Miss drove to Southern's one-yard line in the third quarter, but could not get across. Another Rebel drive was stopped at the 12 when Southern's Craig Logan intercepted Manning's pass.

Manning threw two touch down passes in the opening period, however, the heavily favored Rebels were held scoreless for the rest of the afternoon. The loss snapped a nine-game winning streak dating to the 1969 season. This was Southern's first triumph in the eleven game series dating back to 1913.

Heidelburg scored twice on runs of 11 yards for the Southerners, while Bill Foley streaked 44 yards for another touchdown. Southerns final score came on a 60-yard punt return by Saggus in the third period.

Ray Guy also played a major role in the hard-fought battle, connecting on a tie-breaking, 47-yard field goal shortly before half-time and kicking three extra points for Underwood's eleven.

Attendance: 27,200 (78.8% of Hemingway Stadium at the time)
