= 1970 Holy Cross Crusaders football team =

American college football season

1970 Holy Cross Crusaders football
- Conference: Independent
- Record: 0–10–1
- Head coach: Bill Whitton (2nd season)
- Captains: Thomas F. Lamb; Michael Jordan
- Home stadium: Fitton Field

1970 NCAA University Division independents football records
| | Conf. | | | Overall |
| Team | W | L | T | W | | L | | T |
|---|---|---|---|---|---|---|---|---|
| No. 2 Notre Dame | | – | | 10 | – | 1 | – | 0 |
| Villanova | | – | | 9 | – | 2 | – | 0 |
| No. 16 Air Force | | – | | 9 | – | 3 | – | 0 |
| No. 13 Georgia Tech | | – | | 9 | – | 3 | – | 0 |
| Boston College | | – | | 8 | – | 2 | – | 0 |
| No. 19 Houston | | – | | 8 | – | 3 | – | 0 |
| West Virginia | | – | | 8 | – | 3 | – | 0 |
| No. 17 Tulane | | – | | 8 | – | 4 | – | 0 |
| No. 18 Penn State | | – | | 7 | – | 3 | – | 0 |
| West Texas State | | – | | 7 | – | 3 | – | 0 |
| Cincinnati | | – | | 7 | – | 4 | – | 0 |
| Florida State | | – | | 7 | – | 4 | – | 0 |
| Virginia Tech | | – | | 5 | – | 6 | – | 0 |
| Syracuse | | – | | 6 | – | 4 | – | 0 |
| Dayton | | – | | 5 | – | 4 | – | 1 |
| Pittsburgh | | – | | 5 | – | 5 | – | 0 |
| Rutgers | | – | | 5 | – | 5 | – | 0 |
| Utah State | | – | | 5 | – | 5 | – | 0 |
| Colgate | | – | | 5 | – | 6 | – | 0 |
| Southern Miss | | – | | 5 | – | 6 | – | 0 |
| New Mexico State | | – | | 4 | – | 6 | – | 0 |
| Miami (FL) | | – | | 3 | – | 8 | – | 0 |
| Northern Illinois | | – | | 3 | – | 7 | – | 0 |
| Marshall | | – | | 3 | – | 6 | – | 0 |
| Buffalo | | – | | 2 | – | 9 | – | 0 |
| Navy | | – | | 2 | – | 9 | – | 0 |
| Army | | – | | 1 | – | 9 | – | 1 |
| Xavier | | – | | 1 | – | 9 | – | 0 |
| Holy Cross | | – | | 0 | – | 10 | – | 1 |
Rankings from AP Poll

The 1970 Holy Cross Crusaders football team was an American football team that represented the College of the Holy Cross as an independent during the 1970 NCAA University Division football season. Bill Whitton returned for a second year as head coach. The team compiled a record of 0–10–1.

Reeling financially from the cancellation of all 1969 home games, Holy Cross opted to schedule an 11-game season for the first time in its history, adding a visit to West Point. The no-win, 10-loss season was the worst result in Holy Cross history to that point.

All home games were played at Fitton Field on the Holy Cross campus in Worcester, Massachusetts.

== Schedule ==
| Date | Time | Opponent | Site | Result | Attendance | Source |
|---|---|---|---|---|---|---|
| September 12 | 2:00 p.m. | at Army | Michie Stadium; West Point, NY | L 0–26 | 31,666 | |
| September 19 | | Temple | Fitton Field; Worcester, MA | L 13–23 | 12,500 | |
| October 3 | | Dartmouth | Fitton Field; Worcester, MA | L 14–50 | 13,222 | |
| October 10 | | Colgate^{†} | Fitton Field; Worcester, MA | L 13–21 | 10,111 | |
| October 17 | | at Boston University | Nickerson Field; Boston, MA | L 23–33 | 6,247 | |
| October 24 | 1:30 p.m. | at Villanova | Villanova Stadium; Villanova, PA | L 14–34 | 13,174 | |
| October 31 | 1:50 p.m. | at Buffalo | Rotary Field; Buffalo, NY | L 0–16 | 8,219–8,290 | |
| November 7 | | UMass^ | Fitton Field; Worcester, MA | L 13–29 | 12,881 | |
| November 14 | | at Rutgers | Rutgers Stadium; Piscataway, NJ | L 7–37 | 10,500 | |
| November 21 | | Connecticut | Fitton Field; Worcester, MA | T 20–20 | 6,818–7,000 | |
| November 28 | | at Boston College | Alumni Stadium; Chestnut Hill, MA (rivalry) | L 0–54 | 23,500 | |
^{†}Homecoming; ^ Family Weekend; All times are in Eastern time

== Statistical leaders ==
Statistical leaders for the 1970 Crusaders included:

- Rushing: Joe Wilson, 492 yards and 6 touchdowns on 102 attempts
- Passing: Jerry Lamb, 855 yards, 78 completions and 3 touchdowns on 204 attempts
- Receiving: Jack VonOhlen, 358 yards and 3 touchdowns on 30 receptions
- Scoring: Joe Wilson, 44 points from 7 touchdowns and 1 two-point conversion
- Total offense: Colin Clapton, 599 yards (604 passing, minus-5 rushing)
- All-purpose yards: Joe Wilson, 590 yards (492 rushing, 98 receiving)
- Interceptions: Mike Jordan, 4 interceptions for no yards
