= 1970 New Mexico State Aggies football team =

American college football season

1970 New Mexico State Aggies football
- Conference: Independent
- Record: 4–6
- Head coach: Jim Wood (3rd season)
- Home stadium: Memorial Stadium

1970 NCAA University Division independents football records
	Conf.			Overall
Team	W	L	T	W		L		T
No. 2 Notre Dame		–		10	–	1	–	0
Villanova		–		9	–	2	–	0
No. 16 Air Force		–		9	–	3	–	0
No. 13 Georgia Tech		–		9	–	3	–	0
Boston College		–		8	–	2	–	0
No. 19 Houston		–		8	–	3	–	0
West Virginia		–		8	–	3	–	0
No. 17 Tulane		–		8	–	4	–	0
No. 18 Penn State		–		7	–	3	–	0
West Texas State		–		7	–	3	–	0
Cincinnati		–		7	–	4	–	0
Florida State		–		7	–	4	–	0
Virginia Tech		–		5	–	6	–	0
Syracuse		–		6	–	4	–	0
Dayton		–		5	–	4	–	1
Pittsburgh		–		5	–	5	–	0
Rutgers		–		5	–	5	–	0
Utah State		–		5	–	5	–	0
Colgate		–		5	–	6	–	0
Southern Miss		–		5	–	6	–	0
New Mexico State		–		4	–	6	–	0
Miami (FL)		–		3	–	8	–	0
Northern Illinois		–		3	–	7	–	0
Marshall		–		3	–	6	–	0
Buffalo		–		2	–	9	–	0
Navy		–		2	–	9	–	0
Army		–		1	–	9	–	1
Xavier		–		1	–	9	–	0
Holy Cross		–		0	–	10	–	1
Rankings from AP Poll

The 1970 New Mexico State Aggies football team was an American football team that represented New Mexico State University as an independent during the 1970 NCAA University Division football season. In their third year under head coach Jim Wood, the Aggies compiled a 4–6 record and were outscored by a total of 282 to 277. The team played home games at home games at Memorial Stadium in Las Cruces, New Mexico.

== Schedule ==
Date	Time	Opponent	Site	Result	Attendance	Source
September 12		Colorado State	Memorial Stadium; Las Cruces, NM	L 9–28	15,210	
September 19		UT Arlington	Memorial Stadium; Las Cruces, NM	W 35–7	10,012	
September 26		at SMU	Cotton Bowl; Dallas, TX	L 21–34	30,264	
October 3		at UTEP	Sun Bowl; El Paso, TX	L 14–21	15,653	
October 10		Northern Arizona	Memorial Stadium; Las Cruces, NM	W 57–13	7,655	
October 17		at New Mexico	University Stadium; Albuquerque, NM (rivalry)	L 17–24	17,942	
October 24	7:00 p.m.	at West Texas State	Buffalo Bowl; Canyon, TX	L 7–37	11,500	
October 31	6:30 p.m.	at North Texas State	Fouts Field; Denton, TX	W 32–31	9,500	
November 14		Lamar	Memorial Stadium; Las Cruces, NM	W 69–37	9,800	
November 28		Utah State	Memorial Stadium; Las Cruces, NM	L 21–45	4,750	
All times are in Mountain time
