= 1970 Dayton Flyers football team =

American college football season

1970 Dayton Flyers football
- Conference: Independent
- Record: 5–4–1
- Head coach: John McVay (6th season)
- Home stadium: Baujan Field

1970 NCAA University Division independents football records
	Conf.			Overall
Team	W	L	T	W		L		T
No. 2 Notre Dame		–		10	–	1	–	0
Villanova		–		9	–	2	–	0
No. 16 Air Force		–		9	–	3	–	0
No. 13 Georgia Tech		–		9	–	3	–	0
Boston College		–		8	–	2	–	0
No. 19 Houston		–		8	–	3	–	0
West Virginia		–		8	–	3	–	0
No. 17 Tulane		–		8	–	4	–	0
No. 18 Penn State		–		7	–	3	–	0
West Texas State		–		7	–	3	–	0
Cincinnati		–		7	–	4	–	0
Florida State		–		7	–	4	–	0
Virginia Tech		–		5	–	6	–	0
Syracuse		–		6	–	4	–	0
Dayton		–		5	–	4	–	1
Pittsburgh		–		5	–	5	–	0
Rutgers		–		5	–	5	–	0
Utah State		–		5	–	5	–	0
Colgate		–		5	–	6	–	0
Southern Miss		–		5	–	6	–	0
New Mexico State		–		4	–	6	–	0
Miami (FL)		–		3	–	8	–	0
Northern Illinois		–		3	–	7	–	0
Marshall		–		3	–	6	–	0
Buffalo		–		2	–	9	–	0
Navy		–		2	–	9	–	0
Army		–		1	–	9	–	1
Xavier		–		1	–	9	–	0
Holy Cross		–		0	–	10	–	1
Rankings from AP Poll

The 1970 Dayton Flyers football team represented the University of Dayton as an independent during the 1970 NCAA University Division football season. In their sixth season under head coach John McVay, the Flyers compiled a 5–4–1 record. Dayton played their home games at Baujan Field in Dayton, Ohio

== Schedule ==
Date	Time	Opponent	Site	Result	Attendance	Source
September 12	8:00 p.m.	Xavier	Baujan Field; Dayton, OH	W 45–22	12,338	
September 19	7:45 p.m.	at Cincinnati	Riverfront Stadium; Cincinnati, OH	L 7–13	19,781	
September 26	1:30 p.m.	at Bowling Green	Doyt Perry Stadium; Bowling Green, OH	T 14–14	15,347	
October 3		Louisville	Baujan Field; Dayton, OH	W 28–11	10,004	
October 10	1:30 p.m.	at Ohio	Peden Stadium; Athens, OH	L 14–17	12,100	
October 17	1:30 p.m.	Buffalo	Baujan Field; Dayton, OH	W 41–0	12,820	
October 24		at Akron	Rubber Bowl; Akron, OH	W 14–6	15,230	
October 31	2:30 p.m.	at Northern Illinois	Huskie Stadium; DeKalb, IL	W 21–20	17,780	
November 7		at Miami (OH)	Miami Field; Oxford, OH	L 0–17	9,706	
November 14	1:30 p.m.	No. 16 Toledo	Baujan Field; Dayton, OH	L 7–31	7,163	
Rankings from AP Poll released prior to the game; All times are in Eastern time
