= 1970 Marshall Thundering Herd football team =

American college football season

1970 Marshall Thundering Herd football
- Conference: Independent
- Record: 3–6
- Head coach: Rick Tolley (2nd season)
- Offensive coordinator: Jim "Shorty" Moss
- Defensive coordinator: William "Red" Dawson (3rd season)
- Captain: Dave Griffith
- Home stadium: Fairfield Stadium

1970 NCAA University Division independents football records
	Conf.			Overall
Team	W	L	T	W		L		T
No. 2 Notre Dame		–		10	–	1	–	0
Villanova		–		9	–	2	–	0
No. 16 Air Force		–		9	–	3	–	0
No. 13 Georgia Tech		–		9	–	3	–	0
Boston College		–		8	–	2	–	0
No. 19 Houston		–		8	–	3	–	0
West Virginia		–		8	–	3	–	0
No. 17 Tulane		–		8	–	4	–	0
No. 18 Penn State		–		7	–	3	–	0
West Texas State		–		7	–	3	–	0
Cincinnati		–		7	–	4	–	0
Florida State		–		7	–	4	–	0
Virginia Tech		–		5	–	6	–	0
Syracuse		–		6	–	4	–	0
Dayton		–		5	–	4	–	1
Pittsburgh		–		5	–	5	–	0
Rutgers		–		5	–	5	–	0
Utah State		–		5	–	5	–	0
Colgate		–		5	–	6	–	0
Southern Miss		–		5	–	6	–	0
New Mexico State		–		4	–	6	–	0
Miami (FL)		–		3	–	8	–	0
Northern Illinois		–		3	–	7	–	0
Marshall		–		3	–	6	–	0
Buffalo		–		2	–	9	–	0
Navy		–		2	–	9	–	0
Army		–		1	–	9	–	1
Xavier		–		1	–	9	–	0
Holy Cross		–		0	–	10	–	1
Rankings from AP Poll

Memorial at Spring Hill Cemetery in Huntington, West Virginia to the victims of the 1970 plane crash.

The 1970 Marshall Thundering Herd football team was an American football team that represented Marshall University as an independent during the 1970 NCAA University Division football season. In its second season under head coach Rick Tolley, the team compiled a 3–6 record and was outscored by a total of 202 to 138. The team played its home games at Fairfield Stadium in Huntington, West Virginia.

On November 14, Southern Airways Flight 932, which was chartered by the school to fly the Thundering Herd football team, coaches, and fans to Kinston, North Carolina for a game against the East Carolina Pirates and back to Huntington, crashed on approach to Tri-State Airport after clipping trees just west of the runway and impacting nose-first into a hollow. All 75 people on board died, including 37 members of the football team, five coaches, and seven staff members. It was the worst single air tragedy in NCAA sports history. The tragedy was depicted in the movie We Are Marshall (2006) and the documentary film Marshall University: Ashes to Glory (2000).

== Schedule ==
Date	Time	Opponent	Site	Result	Attendance	Source
September 19		Morehead State	Fairfield Stadium; Huntington, WV	W 17–7	11,000	
September 26	8:00 p.m.	at Toledo	Glass Bowl; Toledo, OH	L 3–52	12,804	
October 3	8:00 p.m.	at Xavier	Corcoran Stadium; Cincinnati, OH	W 31–14	6,535	
October 10		Miami (OH)	Fairfield Stadium; Huntington, WV	L 12–19	7,000	
October 17		Louisville	Fairfield Stadium; Huntington, WV	L 14–16	6,500	
October 24		Western Michigan^{†}	Fairfield Stadium; Huntington, WV	L 3–34	10,000	
October 31	1:30 p.m.	at Bowling Green	Doyt Perry Stadium; Bowling Green, OH	L 24–26	16,073	
November 7	1:30 p.m.	Kent State	Fairfield Stadium; Huntington, WV	W 20–17	6,231	
November 14	2:05 p.m.	at East Carolina	Ficklen Stadium; Greenville, NC (rivalry)	L 14–17	8,711	
November 21		at Ohio	Peden Stadium; Athens, OH (rivalry)	Cancelled		
^{†}Homecoming; All times are in Eastern time

== Roster ==
1970 Marshall Thundering Herd football team roster
Players
Coaches
**Offense**

Pos.	#	Name	Class
QB	12	**Bob** **Harris**	Jr
QB	14	**Ted** **Shoebridge**	Jr
QB	20	**Rick** **Lech**	Jr
RB	22	**Art** **Harris**	So
RB/KR	25	**Kevin** **Gilmore**	Sr
RB	30	Dickie Carter	Sr
TE	35	**Barry** **Nash**	So
OL	50	**Rick** **Dardinger**	Sr
OL	51	**Jim** **Adams**	Sr
OL	52	Mike Swartley	So
OL	53	Wes Hickman	Jr
OL	54	Jim Sly	Jr
C	55	Dennis Foley	So
C	59	**Allen** **Skeens**	So
G	60	**Tom** **Howard**	Jr
OL	61	**Mark** **Andrews**	Jr
OL	63	Jack Crabtree	So
OL	66	**Pat** **Norell**	So
G	67	**Mike** **Blake**	So
OT	71	**Bob** **Patterson**	Jr
OT	73	Jon Calvin	So
OT	76	**David** **DeBord**	Sr
WR	80	**Dennis** **Blevins**	Jr
WR	82	**Jack** **Repasy**	Jr
WR	86	**John** **Young**	So
TE	87	**Freddy** **Wilson**	So

**Defense**

Pos.	#	Name	Class
DB	21	Felix Jordan	So
DB	25	Nate Ruffin	Jr
DB	27	**Roger** **Childers**	So
DL	31	**Willie** **Bluford**	Jr
RB	33	**Joe** **Hood**	So
LB	34	**Art** **Shannon**	Jr
LB	35	Dave Cyrus	Sr
DB	40	**Larry** **Sanders**	Jr
DB	41	**Bobby** **Hill**	So
DB	42	Tony Barile	So
DB	43	**Stuart** **Cottrell**	So
DB	44	Richard Taglang	Jr
DB	45	Gary Morgan	So
LB	56	**Jerry** **Stainback**	Sr
DL	62	**Tom** **Zborill**	Jr
DL	64	Greg Finn	Jr
DL	65	**Tom** **Brown**	Sr
LB	68	**Larry** **Brown**	Sr
DL	70	Ed Deeds	Jr
DL	72	Fred Gaudet	Jr
DL	74	Paul Oden	So
DL	75	**Robert** **Van Horn**	So
DL	77	Eddie Carter	So
DL	79	David Withers	So
LB	81	**Dave** **Griffith**	Sr
LB	83	**Scotty** **Reese**	Jr
DE	84	Pete Naputano	Jr
DE	85	**Roger** **Vanover**	Jr
DE	88	**Al** **Saylor**	So

**Special teams**

Pos.	#	Name	Class
PK/P	23	**Marcelo** **Lajterman**	So
P	32	Richard Brautigan	So

Head coach

- **Rick Tolley**

Coordinators/assistant coaches

- **Deke Brackett**
- **Al Carelli, Jr.**
- Red Dawson
- Mickey Jackson
- Carl Kokor
- **Frank Loria**
- **Jim "Shorty" Moss**

Legend

- **(C)** Team captain
- **(S)** Suspended
- **(I)** Ineligible
- Injured
- Redshirt

People listed in bold italics died in the plane crash on November 14, 1970, along with student trainer Donald Tackett.

== See also ==
- Southern Airways Flight 932
