= 1970 Boston College Eagles football team =

American college football season

1970 Boston College Eagles football
- Conference: Independent
- Record: 8–2
- Head coach: Joe Yukica (3rd season)
- Defensive coordinator: John Petercuskie (2nd season)
- Captain: Joseph “Skip” Coppola
- Home stadium: Alumni Stadium

1970 NCAA University Division independents football records
	Conf.			Overall
Team	W	L	T	W		L		T
No. 2 Notre Dame		–		10	–	1	–	0
Villanova		–		9	–	2	–	0
No. 16 Air Force		–		9	–	3	–	0
No. 13 Georgia Tech		–		9	–	3	–	0
Boston College		–		8	–	2	–	0
No. 19 Houston		–		8	–	3	–	0
West Virginia		–		8	–	3	–	0
No. 17 Tulane		–		8	–	4	–	0
No. 18 Penn State		–		7	–	3	–	0
West Texas State		–		7	–	3	–	0
Cincinnati		–		7	–	4	–	0
Florida State		–		7	–	4	–	0
Virginia Tech		–		5	–	6	–	0
Syracuse		–		6	–	4	–	0
Dayton		–		5	–	4	–	1
Pittsburgh		–		5	–	5	–	0
Rutgers		–		5	–	5	–	0
Utah State		–		5	–	5	–	0
Colgate		–		5	–	6	–	0
Southern Miss		–		5	–	6	–	0
New Mexico State		–		4	–	6	–	0
Miami (FL)		–		3	–	8	–	0
Northern Illinois		–		3	–	7	–	0
Marshall		–		3	–	6	–	0
Buffalo		–		2	–	9	–	0
Navy		–		2	–	9	–	0
Army		–		1	–	9	–	1
Xavier		–		1	–	9	–	0
Holy Cross		–		0	–	10	–	1
Rankings from AP Poll

The 1970 Boston College Eagles football team represented Boston College as an independent during the 1970 NCAA University Division football season. Led by third-year head coach Joe Yukica, the Eagles compiled a record of 8–2, but were not invited to a bowl game. Boston College played home games at Alumni Stadium in Chestnut Hill, Massachusetts.

== Schedule ==
Date	Time	Opponent	Site	Result	Attendance	Source
September 19	1:55 p.m.	at Villanova	Villanova Stadium; Villanova, PA	W 28–21	12,832	
September 26	2:00 p.m.	at Navy	Navy–Marine Corps Memorial Stadium; Annapolis, MD	W 28–14	17,411	
October 3		VMI	Alumni Stadium; Chestnut Hill, MA	W 56–3	15,600	
October 10		Penn State	Alumni Stadium; Chestnut Hill, MA	L 3–28	25,222	
October 24	3:31 p.m.	at No. 7 Air Force	Falcon Stadium; Colorado Springs, CO	L 10–35	38,032	
October 31	1:30 p.m.	Army	Alumni Stadium; Chestnut Hill, MA	W 21–13	25,350	
November 7	1:30 p.m.	Buffalo	Alumni Stadium; Chestnut Hill, MA	W 65–12	18,727	
November 14		at Pittsburgh	Pitt Stadium; Pittsburgh, PA	W 21–6	20,966	
November 21		at UMass	Alumni Stadium; Hadley, MA (rivalry)	W 21–10	17,200	
November 28		Holy Cross	Alumni Stadium; Chestnut Hill, MA (rivalry)	W 54–0	23,500	
Rankings from AP Poll released prior to the game; All times are in Eastern time

== Roster ==
1970 Boston College Eagles football team roster
Players
Coaches
Offense

Pos.	#	Name	Class
QB	17	Frank Harris	Sr
RB	27	Bill Thomas	Jr
RB	33	Fred Willis	Sr

Defense

Pos.	#	Name	Class
DB	20	Gary Dancewicz
DT	73	Jeff Yeates	So

Special teams

Pos.	#	Name	Class

Head coach

- Joe Yukica

Coordinators/assistant coaches

Legend

- (C) Team captain
- (S) Suspended
- (I) Ineligible
- Injured
- Redshirt
