= 1970 Buffalo Bulls football team =

American college football season

1970 Buffalo Bulls football
- Conference: Independent
- Record: 2–9
- Head coach: Bob Deming (2nd season)
- Defensive coordinator: Rick Lantz (3rd season)
- Captains: Charlie Donnor; Prentis Henley
- Home stadium: Rotary Field

1970 NCAA University Division independents football records
	Conf.			Overall
Team	W	L	T	W		L		T
No. 2 Notre Dame		–		10	–	1	–	0
Villanova		–		9	–	2	–	0
No. 16 Air Force		–		9	–	3	–	0
No. 13 Georgia Tech		–		9	–	3	–	0
Boston College		–		8	–	2	–	0
No. 19 Houston		–		8	–	3	–	0
West Virginia		–		8	–	3	–	0
No. 17 Tulane		–		8	–	4	–	0
No. 18 Penn State		–		7	–	3	–	0
West Texas State		–		7	–	3	–	0
Cincinnati		–		7	–	4	–	0
Florida State		–		7	–	4	–	0
Virginia Tech		–		5	–	6	–	0
Syracuse		–		6	–	4	–	0
Dayton		–		5	–	4	–	1
Pittsburgh		–		5	–	5	–	0
Rutgers		–		5	–	5	–	0
Utah State		–		5	–	5	–	0
Colgate		–		5	–	6	–	0
Southern Miss		–		5	–	6	–	0
New Mexico State		–		4	–	6	–	0
Miami (FL)		–		3	–	8	–	0
Northern Illinois		–		3	–	7	–	0
Marshall		–		3	–	6	–	0
Buffalo		–		2	–	9	–	0
Navy		–		2	–	9	–	0
Army		–		1	–	9	–	1
Xavier		–		1	–	9	–	0
Holy Cross		–		0	–	10	–	1
Rankings from AP Poll

The 1970 Buffalo Bulls football team represented the University at Buffalo as an independent during the 1970 NCAA University Division football season. Led by Bob Deming in his second and final season as head coach, the Bulls compiled a record of 2–9. The team's offense scored 133 points while the defense allowed 299 points. Buffalo played home games at Rotary Field in Buffalo, New York.

== Schedule ==
Date	Time	Opponent	Site	TV	Result	Attendance	Source
September 12	1:30 p.m.	Ball State	Rotary Field; Buffalo, NY		L 7–14	9,845	
September 19	1:30 p.m.	Toledo	Rotary Field; Buffalo, NY		L 6–27	7,789	
September 26	1:30 p.m.	at Kent State	Dix Stadium; Kent, OH		L 21–27	10,500	
October 3	1:30 p.m.	UMass	Rotary Field; Buffalo, NY (rivalry)		W 16–13	6,202	
October 10	1:30 p.m.	Villanova	Rotary Field; Buffalo, NY		L 7–17	3,539	
October 17	1:30 p.m.	at Dayton	Baujan Field; Dayton, OH		L 0–41	12,820	
October 24	1:29 p.m.	at Virginia Tech	Lane Stadium; Blacksburg, VA		L 14–31	14,000	
October 31	1:50 p.m.	Holy Cross	Rotary Field; Buffalo, NY	ABC regional	W 16–0	8,219–8,290	
November 7	1:30 p.m.	at Boston College	Alumni Stadium; Chestnut Hill, MA		L 12–65	18,727	
November 14		at Temple	Temple Stadium; Philadelphia, PA		L 8–21	5,000	
November 21	2:30 p.m.	at Northern Illinois	Huskie Stadium; DeKalb, IL		L 26–43	8,581	
All times are in Eastern time
