= 1970 Western Michigan Broncos football team =

American college football season

1970 Western Michigan Broncos football
- Conference: Mid-American Conference
- Record: 7–3 (2–3 MAC)
- Head coach: Bill Doolittle (7th season)
- MVP: Roger Lawson
- Captains: Vern Davis; Greg Flaska
- Home stadium: Waldo Stadium

1970 Mid-American Conference football standings
	Conf.					Overall
Team	W		L		T	W		L		T
No. 12 Toledo $	5	–	0	–	0	12	–	0	–	0
Miami (OH)	3	–	2	–	0	7	–	3	–	0
Ohio	3	–	2	–	0	4	–	5	–	0
Western Michigan	2	–	3	–	0	7	–	3	–	0
Kent State	1	–	4	–	0	3	–	7	–	0
Bowling Green	1	–	4	–	0	2	–	6	–	1
$ – Conference champion; Rankings from AP Poll

The 1970 Western Michigan Broncos football team represented Western Michigan University in the Mid-American Conference (MAC) during the 1970 NCAA University Division football season. In their seventh season under head coach Bill Doolittle, the Broncos compiled a 7–3 record (2–3 against MAC opponents), finished in fourth place in the MAC, and outscored their opponents, 277 to 132. The team played its home games at Waldo Stadium in Kalamazoo, Michigan.

The team's statistical leaders included Ted Grignon with 1,001 passing yards, Roger Lawson with 1,205 rushing yards, and Greg Flaska with 372 receiving yards. Safety Vern Davis and tight end Greg Flaska were the team captains. Fullback Roger Lawson received the team's most outstanding player award.

== Schedule ==
Date	Time	Opponent	Site	Result	Attendance	Source
September 12		at Central Michigan*	Alumni Field; Mount Pleasant, MI (rivalry)	W 41–0	13,500	
September 19	1:30 p.m.	BYU*	Waldo Stadium; Kalamazoo, MI	W 35–17	16,100	
September 26		at Miami (OH)	Miami Field; Oxford, OH	L 12–23	12,000	
October 3	1:30 p.m.	Bowling Green	Waldo Stadium; Kalamazoo, MI	W 23–3	16,000	
October 10		at Kent State	Dix Stadium; Kent, OH	L 22–25	6,856	
October 17	1:31 p.m.	Toledo	Waldo Stadium; Kalamazoo, MI	L 0–20	23,200	
October 24		at Marshall*	Fairfield Stadium; Huntington, WV	W 34–3	10,000	
October 31	1:30 p.m.	Ohio	Waldo Stadium; Kalamazoo, MI	W 52–23	12,500	
November 7	3:00 p.m.	at West Texas State*	Buffalo Bowl; Canyon, TX	W 20–0	10,005	
November 14	1:30 p.m.	Northern Illinois*	Waldo Stadium; Kalamazoo, MI	W 38–18	9,500	
*Non-conference game; All times are in Eastern time
