= 1970 Northern Illinois Huskies football team =

American college football season

1970 Northern Illinois Huskies football
- Conference: Independent
- Record: 3–7
- Head coach: Doc Urich (2nd season)
- MVPs: Dave Weisendanger; Dan DeVito
- Captains: Mike Batina; Dan DeVito; John Lalonde; Phil Szukis
- Home stadium: Huskie Stadium

1970 NCAA University Division independents football records
	Conf.			Overall
Team	W	L	T	W		L		T
No. 2 Notre Dame		–		10	–	1	–	0
Villanova		–		9	–	2	–	0
No. 16 Air Force		–		9	–	3	–	0
No. 13 Georgia Tech		–		9	–	3	–	0
Boston College		–		8	–	2	–	0
No. 19 Houston		–		8	–	3	–	0
West Virginia		–		8	–	3	–	0
No. 17 Tulane		–		8	–	4	–	0
No. 18 Penn State		–		7	–	3	–	0
West Texas State		–		7	–	3	–	0
Cincinnati		–		7	–	4	–	0
Florida State		–		7	–	4	–	0
Virginia Tech		–		5	–	6	–	0
Syracuse		–		6	–	4	–	0
Dayton		–		5	–	4	–	1
Pittsburgh		–		5	–	5	–	0
Rutgers		–		5	–	5	–	0
Utah State		–		5	–	5	–	0
Colgate		–		5	–	6	–	0
Southern Miss		–		5	–	6	–	0
New Mexico State		–		4	–	6	–	0
Miami (FL)		–		3	–	8	–	0
Northern Illinois		–		3	–	7	–	0
Marshall		–		3	–	6	–	0
Buffalo		–		2	–	9	–	0
Navy		–		2	–	9	–	0
Army		–		1	–	9	–	1
Xavier		–		1	–	9	–	0
Holy Cross		–		0	–	10	–	1
Rankings from AP Poll

The 1970 Northern Illinois Huskies football team represented Northern Illinois University as an independent during the 1970 NCAA University Division football season. Led by Doc Urich in his second and final year as head coach, the Huskies compiled a record of 3–7. Northern Illinois played home games at Huskie Stadium in DeKalb, Illinois.

== Schedule ==
Date	Time	Opponent	Site	Result	Attendance	Source
September 12	7:30 p.m.	San Diego State	Huskie Stadium; DeKalb, IL	L 3–35	9,116	
September 19	7:30 p.m.	Montana	Huskie Stadium; DeKalb, IL	L 6–30	11,278–13,000	
September 26	7:00 p.m.	at Xavier	Corcoran Stadium; Cincinnati, OH	W 18–0	3,645	
October 3		Miami (OH)	Huskie Stadium; DeKalb, IL	L 0–48	12,025	
October 10	7:30 p.m.	West Texas State	Huskie Stadium; DeKalb, IL	L 22–24	9,591	
October 24	12:30 p.m.	at Ball State	Ball State Stadium; Muncie, IN (rivalry)	W 31–14	4,770	
October 31	1:30 p.m.	Dayton	Huskie Stadium; DeKalb, IL	L 20–21	17,780	
November 7		at No. 15 Toledo	Glass Bowl; Toledo, OH	L 7–45	12,127	
November 14	12:30 p.m.	at Western Michigan	Waldo Stadium; Kalamazoo, MI	L 18–38	9,500	
November 21	1:30 p.m.	Buffalo	Huskie Stadium; DeKalb, IL	W 43–26	8,581	
Rankings from AP Poll released prior to the game; All times are in Central time
