= 1970 Miami Redskins football team =

American college football season

1970 Miami Redskins football
- Conference: Mid-American Conference
- Record: 7–3 (3–2 MAC)
- Head coach: Bill Mallory (2nd season)
- MVP: Dick Adams
- Captains: Dick Adams; Jim Bengala
- Home stadium: Miami Field

1970 Mid-American Conference football standings
	Conf.					Overall
Team	W		L		T	W		L		T
No. 12 Toledo $	5	–	0	–	0	12	–	0	–	0
Miami (OH)	3	–	2	–	0	7	–	3	–	0
Ohio	3	–	2	–	0	4	–	5	–	0
Western Michigan	2	–	3	–	0	7	–	3	–	0
Kent State	1	–	4	–	0	3	–	7	–	0
Bowling Green	1	–	4	–	0	2	–	6	–	1
$ – Conference champion; Rankings from AP Poll

The 1970 Miami Redskins football team was an American football team that represented Miami University in the Mid-American Conference (MAC) during the 1970 NCAA University Division football season. In their second season under head coach Bill Mallory, Miami compiled a 7–3 record (3–2 against MAC opponents), finished in a tie for second place in the MAC, and outscored all opponents by a combined total of 187 to 112. The team's defense allowed only 11.2 points per game, which ranked 10th among 123 NCAA University Division football teams.

The team's statistical leaders included Jim Bengala with 1,265 passing yards, Tim Fortney with 1,063 rushing yards, and Mike Palija with 659 receiving yards.

Defensive back Dick Adams won the Miami most valuable player award. Adams was also selected as a second-team All-American by the Associated Press. Adams and Jim Bengala were the team captains.

== Schedule ==
Date	Time	Opponent	Site	Result	Attendance	Source
September 19	4:30 p.m.	vs. Xavier*	Riverfront Stadium; Cincinnati, OH	W 28–7	19,871–22,000	
September 26		Western Michigan	Miami Field; Oxford, OH	W 23–12	12,000	
October 3		at Northern Illinois*	Huskie Stadium; DeKalb, IL	W 48–0	12,025	
October 10		at Marshall*	Fairfield Stadium; Huntington, WV	W 19–12	7,000	
October 17	1:30 p.m.	at Ohio	Peden Stadium; Athens, OH (rivalry)	L 22–23	17,100	
October 24		Bowling Green	Miami Field; Oxford, OH	W 7–3	13,212	
October 31	1:30 p.m.	at Toledo	Glass Bowl; Toledo, OH	L 13–14	18,439	
November 7		Dayton*	Miami Field; Oxford, OH	W 17–0	9,706	
November 14		Kent State	Miami Field; Oxford, OH	W 10–8	8,223	
November 21	1:30 p.m.	at Cincinnati*	Nippert Stadium; Cincinnati, OH (rivalry)	L 0–33	10,164	
*Non-conference game; All times are in Eastern time

== Roster ==
1970 Miami Redskins football team roster
Players
Coaches
Offense

Pos.	#	Name	Class
QB	12	Steve Williams	So

Defense

Pos.	#	Name	Class
DB	23	Dick Adams	Sr
DE	82	Jim Scott	Sr

Special teams

Pos.	#	Name	Class

Head coach

- Bill Mallory

Coordinators/assistant coaches

Legend

- (C) Team captain
- (S) Suspended
- (I) Ineligible
- Injured
- Redshirt
