= 1970 Kent State Golden Flashes football team =

American college football season

1970 Kent State Golden Flashes football
- Conference: Mid-American Conference
- Record: 3–7 (1–4 MAC)
- Head coach: Dave Puddington (3rd season)
- Home stadium: Memorial Stadium

1970 Mid-American Conference football standings
	Conf.					Overall
Team	W		L		T	W		L		T
No. 12 Toledo $	5	–	0	–	0	12	–	0	–	0
Miami (OH)	3	–	2	–	0	7	–	3	–	0
Ohio	3	–	2	–	0	4	–	5	–	0
Western Michigan	2	–	3	–	0	7	–	3	–	0
Kent State	1	–	4	–	0	3	–	7	–	0
Bowling Green	1	–	4	–	0	2	–	6	–	1
$ – Conference champion; Rankings from AP Poll

The 1970 Kent State Golden Flashes football team was an American football team that represented Kent State University in the Mid-American Conference (MAC) during the 1970 NCAA University Division football season. In their third and final season under head coach Dave Puddington, the Golden Flashes compiled a 3–7 record (1–4 against MAC opponents), finished in fifth place in the MAC, and were outscored by all opponents by a combined total of 222 to 161.

The team's statistical leaders included fullback Don Nottingham with 798 rushing yards and 48 points scored, quarterback Steve Broderick with 757 passing yards, and Jeff Murrey with 165 receiving yards. Center Fred Blosser was selected as a first-team All-MAC player. Other notable players on the team included Nick Saban and John Matsko, both of whom went on to notable coaching careers.

The Kent State shootings of May 4, 1970, focused attention on the 1970 Kent State football team, as one of the first activities of the new academic year in the fall of 1970. Before the season began, coach Puddington noted that his players believed they could "set the tone" and become "a unifying force on the campus." Nick Saban, a sophomore on the 1970 team, later recalled seeing the aftermath of the shootings: "It's a horrible thing. There's not a May 4 that goes by that I don't think about it. Really think about it."

On November 12, 1970, Puddington announced that he would resign as the school's football coach at the end of the quarter. He had compiled a 9–21 record in three seasons at Kent State. Puddington cited factors contributing to his decision, including "prevailing contagious negativism on campus" since the May 4 shootings as well as "fatalism around us and the current tendency to politicize every facet of life."

== Schedule ==
Date	Time	Opponent	Site	Result	Attendance	Source
September 19		Ohio	Memorial Stadium; Kent, OH	L 14–24	14,500	
September 26	1:30 p.m.	Buffalo*	Memorial Stadium; Kent, OH	W 27–21	10,500	
October 3	1:33 p.m.	at Pittsburgh*	Pitt Stadium; Pittsburgh, PA	L 6–27	20,038	
October 10		Western Michigan	Memorial Stadium; Kent, OH	W 25–22	6,856	
October 17	1:30 p.m.	at Bowling Green	Doyt Perry Stadium; Bowling Green, OH (rivalry)	L 0–44	16,670	
October 24		No. T–19 Toledo	Memorial Stadium; Kent, OH	L 17–34	8,019	
October 31	7:02 p.m.	at Louisville*	Fairgrounds Stadium; Louisville, KY	L 13–14	7,222	
November 7	1:30 p.m.	at Marshall*	Fairfield Stadium; Huntington, WV	L 17–20	6,231	
November 14		at Miami (OH)	Miami Field; Oxford, OH	L 8–10	8,223	
November 21		Xavier*	Memorial Stadium; Kent, OH	W 34–6	2,321	
*Non-conference game; Rankings from AP Poll released prior to the game; All times are in Eastern time
