= 1970 Georgia Tech Yellow Jackets football team =

American college football season

1970 Georgia Tech Yellow Jackets football
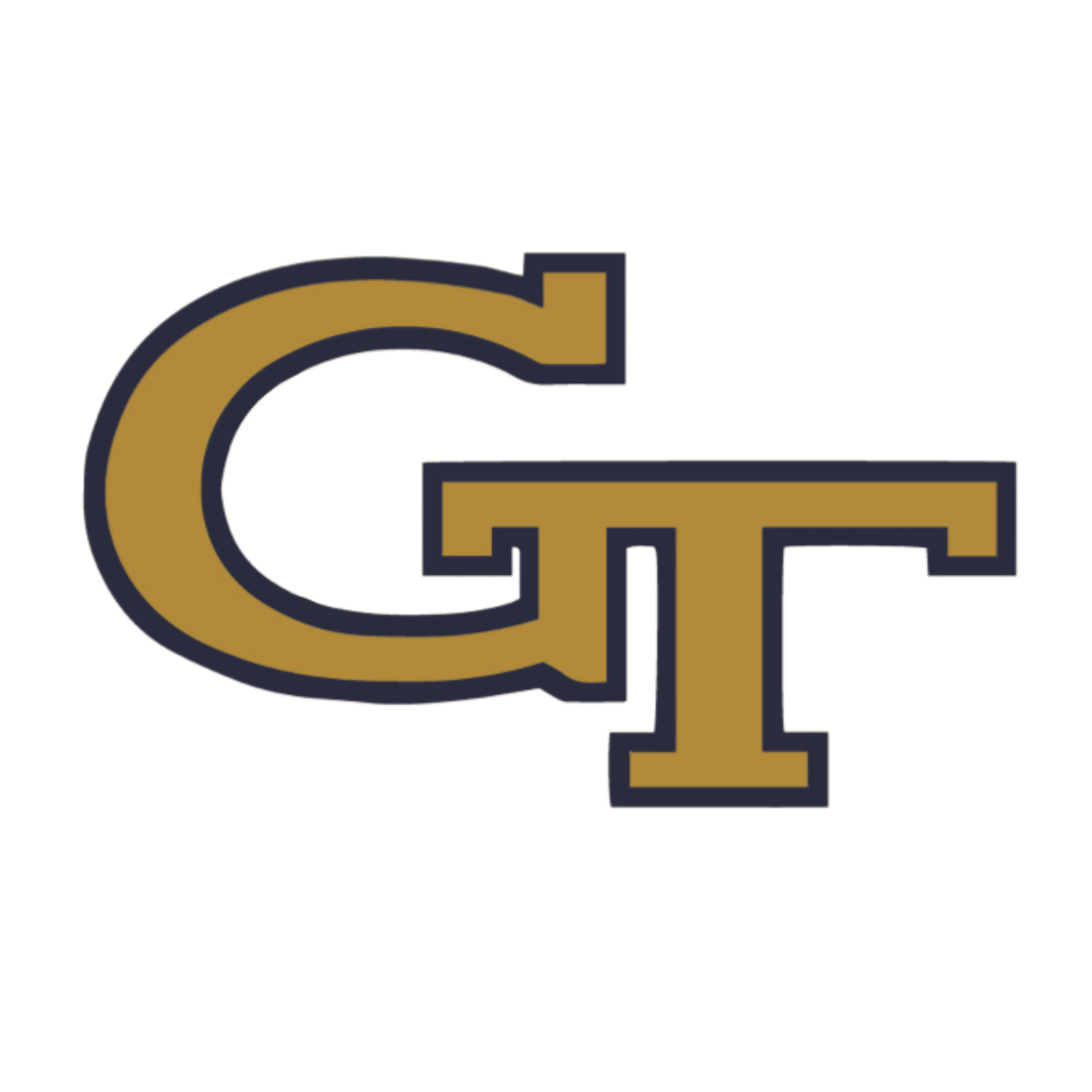

Sun Bowl champion

Sun Bowl, W 17–9 vs. Texas Tech
- Conference: Independent

Ranking
- Coaches: No. 17
- AP: No. 13
- Record: 9–3
- Head coach: Bud Carson (4th season)
- Captains: Jack Williams; Rock Perdoni
- Home stadium: Grant Field

1970 NCAA University Division independents football records
	Conf.			Overall
Team	W	L	T	W		L		T
No. 2 Notre Dame		–		10	–	1	–	0
Villanova		–		9	–	2	–	0
No. 16 Air Force		–		9	–	3	–	0
No. 13 Georgia Tech		–		9	–	3	–	0
Boston College		–		8	–	2	–	0
No. 19 Houston		–		8	–	3	–	0
West Virginia		–		8	–	3	–	0
No. 17 Tulane		–		8	–	4	–	0
No. 18 Penn State		–		7	–	3	–	0
West Texas State		–		7	–	3	–	0
Cincinnati		–		7	–	4	–	0
Florida State		–		7	–	4	–	0
Virginia Tech		–		5	–	6	–	0
Syracuse		–		6	–	4	–	0
Dayton		–		5	–	4	–	1
Pittsburgh		–		5	–	5	–	0
Rutgers		–		5	–	5	–	0
Utah State		–		5	–	5	–	0
Colgate		–		5	–	6	–	0
Southern Miss		–		5	–	6	–	0
New Mexico State		–		4	–	6	–	0
Miami (FL)		–		3	–	8	–	0
Northern Illinois		–		3	–	7	–	0
Marshall		–		3	–	6	–	0
Buffalo		–		2	–	9	–	0
Navy		–		2	–	9	–	0
Army		–		1	–	9	–	1
Xavier		–		1	–	9	–	0
Holy Cross		–		0	–	10	–	1
Rankings from AP Poll

The 1970 Georgia Tech Yellow Jackets football team represented the Georgia Institute of Technology as an independent during the 1970 NCAA University Division football season. The Yellow Jackets were led by fourth-year head coach Bud Carson and played their home games at Grant Field in Atlanta.

Georgia Tech started the year with four straight victories, climbing to 13th in the AP Poll. Two losses to ranked rivals Tennessee and Auburn knocked them out of the polls. After racking up three more wins, they traveled to Notre Dame and almost pulled off an upset over the No. 1 team in the country, as the Fighting Irish needed a fourth-quarter comeback to beat the Yellow Jackets. The close loss actually brought Georgia Tech back into the polls, at 16th. After defeating rival Georgia, they were invited to the 1970 Sun Bowl, where they defeated Texas Tech, 17–9.

== Schedule ==
Date	Time	Opponent	Rank	Site	TV	Result	Attendance	Source
September 12		No. 17 South Carolina		Grant Field; Atlanta, GA		W 23–20	51,206	
September 19		Florida State		Grant Field; Atlanta, GA		W 23–13	50,324	
September 26	2:00 p.m.	Miami (FL)	No. 19	Grant Field; Atlanta, GA		W 31–21	44,246	
October 3		Clemson	No. 15	Grant Field; Atlanta, GA (rivalry)		W 28–7	50,113	
October 10		No. 20 Tennessee	No. 13	Grant Field; Atlanta, GA (rivalry)		L 6–17	59,624	
October 17		at No. 8 Auburn	No. 16	Cliff Hare Stadium; Auburn, AL (rivalry)		L 7–31	62,391	
October 24		Tulane		Grant Field; Atlanta, GA		W 20–6	32,129	
October 31		at Duke		Wallace Wade Stadium; Durham, NC		W 24–16	32,650	
November 7	2:00 p.m.	Navy^{†}		Grant Field; Atlanta, GA		W 30–8	50,105	
November 14		at No. 1 Notre Dame		Notre Dame Stadium; Notre Dame, IN (rivalry)		L 7–10	59,075	
November 28		at Georgia	No. 16	Sanford Stadium; Athens, GA (Clean, Old-Fashioned Hate)		W 17–7	59,803	
December 19		vs. No. 19 Texas Tech	No. 13	Sun Bowl; El Paso, TX (Sun Bowl)	CBS	W 17–9	30,512	
^{†}Homecoming; Rankings from AP Poll released prior to the game; All times are in Eastern time

== Roster ==
1970 Georgia Tech Yellow Jackets football team roster
Players
Coaches
Offense

Pos.	#	Name	Class
C	56	John Callan	Jr
OT	70	Glenn Costello	So
RB	41	Steve Harkey	Sr
QB	1	Eddie McAshan	So
RB	29	Kevin McNamara	Sr
QB	18	Jack O'Neill	Sr
WR	33	Larry Studdard	Jr

Defense

Pos.	#	Name	Class
DL	95	Brad Bourne	So
DE	99	Randy Duckworth	Jr
DB	30	Jeff Ford	Jr
DL	92	Smylie Gebhart	Jr

Special teams

Pos.	#	Name	Class

Head coach

- Bud Carson

Coordinators/assistant coaches

Legend

- (C) Team captain
- (S) Suspended
- (I) Ineligible
- Injured
- Redshirt
