= 1970 Florida State Seminoles football team =

American college football season

1970 Florida State Seminoles football
- Conference: Independent
- Record: 7–4
- Head coach: Bill Peterson (11th season)
- Offensive scheme: Pro set
- Defensive coordinator: Don Harbison (5th season)
- Base defense: 4–3
- Captain: Game captains
- Home stadium: Doak Campbell Stadium

1970 NCAA University Division independents football records
	Conf.			Overall
Team	W	L	T	W		L		T
No. 2 Notre Dame		–		10	–	1	–	0
Villanova		–		9	–	2	–	0
No. 16 Air Force		–		9	–	3	–	0
No. 13 Georgia Tech		–		9	–	3	–	0
Boston College		–		8	–	2	–	0
No. 19 Houston		–		8	–	3	–	0
West Virginia		–		8	–	3	–	0
No. 17 Tulane		–		8	–	4	–	0
No. 18 Penn State		–		7	–	3	–	0
West Texas State		–		7	–	3	–	0
Cincinnati		–		7	–	4	–	0
Florida State		–		7	–	4	–	0
Virginia Tech		–		5	–	6	–	0
Syracuse		–		6	–	4	–	0
Dayton		–		5	–	4	–	1
Pittsburgh		–		5	–	5	–	0
Rutgers		–		5	–	5	–	0
Utah State		–		5	–	5	–	0
Colgate		–		5	–	6	–	0
Southern Miss		–		5	–	6	–	0
New Mexico State		–		4	–	6	–	0
Miami (FL)		–		3	–	8	–	0
Northern Illinois		–		3	–	7	–	0
Marshall		–		3	–	6	–	0
Buffalo		–		2	–	9	–	0
Navy		–		2	–	9	–	0
Army		–		1	–	9	–	1
Xavier		–		1	–	9	–	0
Holy Cross		–		0	–	10	–	1
Rankings from AP Poll

The 1970 Florida State Seminoles football team represented Florida State University as an independent during the 1970 NCAA University Division football season. Led by 11th-year head coach Bill Peterson, the Seminoles compiled a record of 7–4.

== Schedule ==
Date	Time	Opponent	Site	TV	Result	Attendance	Source
September 12	7:31 p.m.	Louisville	Doak Campbell Stadium; Tallahassee, FL		W 9–7	27,389	
September 19		at Georgia Tech	Grant Field; Atlanta, GA	ABC	L 13–23	50,324	
September 26		Wake Forest	Doak Campbell Stadium; Tallahassee, FL		W 19–14	27,196	
October 10		Florida	Doak Campbell Stadium; Tallahassee, FL (rivalry)		L 27–38	42,704	
October 17		at Memphis State	Memphis Memorial Stadium; Memphis, TN		L 12–16	29,047	
October 24		at South Carolina	Carolina Stadium; Columbia, SC		W 21–13	42,537	
October 30		at Miami (FL)	Miami Orange Bowl; Miami, FL (rivalry)		W 27–3	24,168	
November 7		Clemson	Doak Campbell Stadium; Tallahassee, FL (rivalry)		W 38–13	25,176	
November 14		Virginia Tech	Doak Campbell Stadium; Tallahassee, FL		W 37–8	25,291	
November 21		Kansas State	Doak Campbell Stadium; Tallahassee, FL		W 33–7	23,448	
November 26		vs. Houston	Tampa Stadium; Tampa, FL	ABC	L 21–53	18,053	
All times are in Eastern time

== Roster ==
1970 Florida State Seminoles football team roster
Players
Coaches
Offense

Pos.	#	Name	Class
WR	82	Rhett Dawson	Jr
QB	19	Gary Huff	So
TE	84	Gary Parris	So
WR	22	Barry Smith	So
QB		Dick Hopkins	Fr

Defense

Pos.	#	Name	Class
DE	50	Charlie Hunt	So
DB	40	Eddie McMillan	So
DB	26	J. T. Thomas	So
DE	57	Steve Bratton	So

Special teams

Pos.	#	Name	Class

Head coach

- Bill Peterson

Coordinators/assistant coaches

- Bill Parcells linebackers coach
- Dick Tressel graduate assistant

Legend

- (C) Team captain
- (S) Suspended
- (I) Ineligible
- Injured
- Redshirt
