= 1970 Virginia Tech Gobblers football team =

American college football season

1970 Virginia Tech Gobblers football
- Conference: Independent
- Record: 5–6
- Head coach: Jerry Claiborne (10th season)
- Home stadium: Lane Stadium

1970 NCAA University Division independents football records
	Conf.			Overall
Team	W	L	T	W		L		T
No. 2 Notre Dame		–		10	–	1	–	0
Villanova		–		9	–	2	–	0
No. 16 Air Force		–		9	–	3	–	0
No. 13 Georgia Tech		–		9	–	3	–	0
Boston College		–		8	–	2	–	0
No. 19 Houston		–		8	–	3	–	0
West Virginia		–		8	–	3	–	0
No. 17 Tulane		–		8	–	4	–	0
No. 18 Penn State		–		7	–	3	–	0
West Texas State		–		7	–	3	–	0
Cincinnati		–		7	–	4	–	0
Florida State		–		7	–	4	–	0
Virginia Tech		–		5	–	6	–	0
Syracuse		–		6	–	4	–	0
Dayton		–		5	–	4	–	1
Pittsburgh		–		5	–	5	–	0
Rutgers		–		5	–	5	–	0
Utah State		–		5	–	5	–	0
Colgate		–		5	–	6	–	0
Southern Miss		–		5	–	6	–	0
New Mexico State		–		4	–	6	–	0
Miami (FL)		–		3	–	8	–	0
Northern Illinois		–		3	–	7	–	0
Marshall		–		3	–	6	–	0
Buffalo		–		2	–	9	–	0
Navy		–		2	–	9	–	0
Army		–		1	–	9	–	1
Xavier		–		1	–	9	–	0
Holy Cross		–		0	–	10	–	1
Rankings from AP Poll

The 1970 Virginia Tech Gobblers football team represented Virginia Polytechnic Institute and State University in the 1970 NCAA University Division football season. The Gobblers finished the 1970 season with a record of 5–6 under tenth-year head coach Jerry Claiborne. Senior quarterback Gil Schwabe led the offense, completing 61 of 126 passes for 815 yards and five touchdowns. Sophomore Don Strock appeared in nine games as a backup, throwing for 189 yards and one touchdown. Fullback Tommy Barber paced the ground game with 501 rushing yards on 93 carries, averaging 5.4 yards per attempt. The Gobblers averaged 18.1 points per game while allowing 20.7, with close wins over VMI, Wake Forest, and Richmond offset by narrow losses to Kentucky and Florida State. The defense was anchored by linebacker Mike Widger and lineman George Foussekis, while Dave Strock handled kicking duties. Virginia Tech played as an independent and hosted home games at Lane Stadium in Blacksburg, Virginia.

Days after the season ended, tenth-year head coach Jerry Claiborne resigned; his overall record in Blacksburg was 61–39–2 (.608).

== Schedule ==
Date	Time	Opponent	Site	Result	Attendance	Source
September 12		Virginia	Lane Stadium; Blacksburg, VA (rivalry)	L 0–7	23,000	
September 19		at Alabama	Legion Field; Birmingham, AL	L 18–51	53,958	
September 26	1:31 p.m.	Memphis State	Lane Stadium; Blacksburg, VA	L 20–21	18,000	
October 3		at South Carolina	Carolina Stadium; Columbia, SC	L 7–24	41,563	
October 10		at Wake Forest	Groves Stadium; Winston-Salem, NC	L 9–28	18,500	
October 17		Tulsa^{†}	Lane Stadium; Blacksburg, VA	W 17–14	24,000	
October 24	1:29 p.m.	Buffalo	Lane Stadium; Blacksburg, VA	W 31–14	14,000–15,000	
October 31		at William & Mary	Cary Field; Williamsburg, VA	W 35–14	11,000	
November 7	1:30 p.m.	Villanova	Lane Stadium; Blacksburg, VA	W 34–7	16,000	
November 14		at Florida State	Doak Campbell Stadium; Tallahassee, FL	L 8–34	25,291	
November 21		vs. VMI	Victory Stadium; Roanoke, VA (rivalry)	W 20–14	7,000	
^{†}Homecoming; All times are in Eastern time

== Game summaries ==
=== September 12 – vs. VMI ===
Virginia Tech opened the season with a 28–7 win over VMI at Lane Stadium. Senior quarterback Gil Schwabe threw two touchdown passes—one to Ken Edwards and another to Mike Scales—while fullback Tommy Barber added a rushing touchdown. Dave Strock kicked four extra points, and the defense held VMI to under 150 total yards.

=== September 19 – vs. Wake Forest ===
The Gobblers edged Wake Forest 17–14 in a defensive battle. Gil Schwabe threw a 22-yard touchdown pass to Bob Smith, and Tommy Barber scored on a short run. Dave Strock added a 34-yard field goal in the third quarter to give Tech the lead for good.

=== September 26 – at Kentucky ===
Virginia Tech fell 20–17 to Kentucky in Lexington. Gil Schwabe threw a touchdown pass to Mike Scales, and Tommy Barber added a rushing score. Dave Strock kicked a 38-yard field goal, but the Wildcats scored the game-winning touchdown in the final minutes.

=== October 3 – vs. Florida State ===
Virginia Tech lost 24–14 to Florida State at Lane Stadium. Gil Schwabe threw for 145 yards and a touchdown to Ken Edwards. Tommy Barber rushed for 72 yards and a score, but the Seminoles pulled away with two fourth-quarter touchdowns.

=== October 10 – vs. Richmond ===
Virginia Tech defeated Richmond 21–7 behind a strong rushing attack. Tommy Barber scored twice on short runs, and Gil Schwabe added a touchdown pass to Bob Smith. The defense forced three turnovers and held Richmond scoreless in the second half.

=== October 17 – at West Virginia ===
The Gobblers fell 28–7 to West Virginia in Morgantown. Gil Schwabe threw a touchdown pass to Mike Scales, but the Mountaineers dominated the second half. Don Strock saw limited action in relief, completing two passes for 24 yards.

=== October 24 – at Florida ===
Virginia Tech lost 31–14 to Florida in Gainesville. Gil Schwabe threw for 165 yards and a touchdown to Ken Edwards. Tommy Barber added a rushing score, but the Gators scored 21 unanswered points in the second half.

=== October 31 – vs. Tulsa ===
Virginia Tech dropped a 35–21 decision to Tulsa. Gil Schwabe threw two touchdown passes—one each to Mike Scales and Bob Smith—and Tommy Barber added a rushing touchdown. Don Strock completed three passes for 45 yards in late action.

=== November 7 – at Southern Miss ===
Virginia Tech lost 17–10 to Southern Miss in Hattiesburg. Gil Schwabe threw a touchdown pass to Ken Edwards, and Dave Strock kicked a 29-yard field goal. The Golden Eagles intercepted two passes and held Tech scoreless in the second half.

=== November 14 – vs. Houston ===
Virginia Tech fell 42–14 to Houston at Lane Stadium. Gil Schwabe threw a touchdown pass to Mike Scales, and Tommy Barber scored on a 3-yard run. Don Strock completed four passes for 65 yards in relief.

=== November 21 – at Virginia ===
Virginia Tech closed the season with a 17–14 win over Virginia in Charlottesville. Gil Schwabe threw a touchdown pass to Ken Edwards, and Tommy Barber added a rushing score. Dave Strock kicked the game-winning 36-yard field goal in the fourth quarter.

== Roster ==
The following players were members of the 1970 football team according to the roster published in the 1971 edition of The Bugle, the Virginia Tech yearbook.

1970 Virginia Tech roster
John Harwood "Jack" Abraham; Dan Bailey; David Bailey; Howy Beverly; Robert Clinton Bond; Tim Bosiack; Sammy Bria; Glenn Brown; Floyd Burger; Mike Burnop; Tom Carpenito; Matt Cartwright; Dennis Cogan; Nick Colobro; Jon Conlin; Donald Dewitt Cooke; Rod Cox; Curt Cretti; Bobby Dabbs; Nick DelViscio; Barry DeMarr; Buddy DeMarr; Bruce Denardo; John Dobbins; Bob German; Bruce Glatthorn; George Butch Hall	Larry Hartman; Andy Harver; Scott Hawkins; Steve Herl; Ronnie Holsinger; Bill House; Jeff Hunsucker; John Ivanac; Eddie Johns; Bob Karlsen; Larry Kushner; Lou Lagana; Jim Lawlor; Dick Maksanty; Steve Maguigan; Ed Mathias; Rich Matijevich; Kevin Meehan; Tom Mikulski; Olin Phillips; James Anthony Pigninelli; Jim Polito; David Banks Quarles; Jimmy Quinn; Barny Ratliff; Don Reel; Pat Rheam	Andy Romick; Bruce Runyan; Vince Russo; John William Schneider; Gil Schwabe; Ron Sebeck; Jack Simcsak; Larry Smith; Leonard James Smith; Dale Soncini; Bob Sporio; John Sprenkle; Don Sprouse; Terry Stewart; Craig Stinnett; Wayne Stinnette; Larry Duke Strager; Paul Christian Striffler; Dave Strock; Don Strock; Ed Tennis; Perry Tiberio; Bob Williams; Chris Woody; Steve Zeigler
