= 1970 West Virginia Mountaineers football team =

American college football season

1970 West Virginia Mountaineers football
- Conference: Independent
- Record: 8–3
- Head coach: Bobby Bowden (1st season)
- Home stadium: Mountaineer Field

1970 NCAA University Division independents football records
	Conf.			Overall
Team	W	L	T	W		L		T
No. 2 Notre Dame		–		10	–	1	–	0
Villanova		–		9	–	2	–	0
No. 16 Air Force		–		9	–	3	–	0
No. 13 Georgia Tech		–		9	–	3	–	0
Boston College		–		8	–	2	–	0
No. 19 Houston		–		8	–	3	–	0
West Virginia		–		8	–	3	–	0
No. 17 Tulane		–		8	–	4	–	0
No. 18 Penn State		–		7	–	3	–	0
West Texas State		–		7	–	3	–	0
Cincinnati		–		7	–	4	–	0
Florida State		–		7	–	4	–	0
Virginia Tech		–		5	–	6	–	0
Syracuse		–		6	–	4	–	0
Dayton		–		5	–	4	–	1
Pittsburgh		–		5	–	5	–	0
Rutgers		–		5	–	5	–	0
Utah State		–		5	–	5	–	0
Colgate		–		5	–	6	–	0
Southern Miss		–		5	–	6	–	0
New Mexico State		–		4	–	6	–	0
Miami (FL)		–		3	–	8	–	0
Northern Illinois		–		3	–	7	–	0
Marshall		–		3	–	6	–	0
Buffalo		–		2	–	9	–	0
Navy		–		2	–	9	–	0
Army		–		1	–	9	–	1
Xavier		–		1	–	9	–	0
Holy Cross		–		0	–	10	–	1
Rankings from AP Poll

The 1970 West Virginia Mountaineers football team represented West Virginia University in the 1970 NCAA University Division football season. It was the Mountaineers' 78th overall season and they competed as an independent. The team was led by head coach Bobby Bowden, in his first year, and played their home games at Mountaineer Field in Morgantown, West Virginia. They finished the season with a record of 8–3.

== Schedule ==
Date	Opponent	Rank	Site	Result	Attendance	Source
September 12	William & Mary	No. T–20	Mountaineer Field; Morgantown, WV	W 43–7	32,000	
September 19	Richmond	No. 17	Mountaineer Field; Morgantown, WV	W 49–10	33,500	
September 26	VMI	No. 16	Mountaineer Field; Morgantown, WV	W 47–10	27,500	
October 3	at Indiana	No. 14	Seventeenth Street Stadium; Bloomington, IN	W 16–10	44,882	
October 10	Duke	No. 11	Mountaineer Field; Morgantown, WV	L 13–21	35,000	
October 17	at Pittsburgh		Pitt Stadium; Pittsburgh, PA (rivalry)	L 35–36	44,479	
October 24	Colorado State		Mountaineer Field; Morgantown, WV	W 24–21	28,500	
October 31	at Penn State		Beaver Stadium; University Park, PA (rivalry)	L 8–42	48,932	
November 7	at East Carolina		Ficklen Memorial Stadium; Greenville, NC	W 28–14	10,240	
November 14	Syracuse		Mountaineer Field; Morgantown, WV (rivalry)	W 28–19	28,500	
November 28	at Maryland		Byrd Stadium; College Park, MD (rivalry)	W 20–10	12,821	
Rankings from AP Poll released prior to the game

== Roster ==
1970 West Virginia Mountaineers football team roster
Players
Coaches
Offense

Pos.	#	Name	Class
QB	11	Dick Ward	Sr
QB	14	Mike Sherwood	Sr
QB	15	Kim West	So
RB	33	Bob Gresham	Sr
RB	44	Jim Braxton	Sr
WR	85	Hollis Haff	Jr

Defense

Pos.	#	Name	Class
DB	21	Leon Jenkins	Jr
DB	28	Mike Gillespie	Sr
LB	50	Dale Farley	Sr
LB	52	David Benn	Sr
LB	53	Terry King	Jr
LB	54	Dan Hannahs	So
LB	55	Danny Smith	Sr
LB	80	Ron Goodwin	Jr
DE	81	Rick Stump	So
DE	81	Tom Tamburino	So
DE	82	John Hale	Sr
DT	83	Frank Samsa	So
DE	83	Russ Sweickert	So
DE	84	Art Holdt	Sr
DE	86	Ken Osleger	Jr
DE	87	Scott Hindsley	Jr

Special teams

Pos.	#	Name	Class

Head coach

- Bobby Bowden

Coordinators/assistant coaches

Legend

- (C) Team captain
- (S) Suspended
- (I) Ineligible
- Injured
- Redshirt
