= Warren Koegel =

American football player (born 1949)

No. 56, 55, 53
- Position: Center

Personal information
- Born: November 1, 1949 (age 77); Mineola, New York, U.S.
- Listed height: 6 ft 3 in (1.91 m)
- Listed weight: 253 lb (115 kg)

Career information
- High school: Seaford (NY)
- College: Penn State
- NFL draft: 1971: 3rd round, 73rd overall pick

Career history

Playing
- Oakland Raiders (1971); St. Louis Cardinals (1973); New York Jets (1974)

Coaching
- Wyoming (1977–1983) (assistant coach); Rutgers (1984–1990) (assistant coach); Connecticut (1992–1997) (recruiting coordinator/defensive line coach)

Operations
- Chattanooga (1998–2000) (associate athletic director); Coastal Carolina (2000–2010) (athletic director); Jacksonville State (2011–2014) (athletic director)

Awards and highlights
- First-team All-East (1970)

Career NFL statistics
- Games played: 6
- Games started: 1
- Stats at Pro Football Reference

Warren DeWitt Koegel (born November 1, 1949) is an American former professional football player and college athletics administrator. Koegel attended Pennsylvania State University, where he played for coach Joe Paterno on the Penn State Nittany Lions football team. He went on to play parts of three seasons in the NFL between 1971 and 1974, playing for the Oakland Raiders, St. Louis Cardinals, and New York Jets. Koegel later served as athletic director at Coastal Carolina University from 2000 to 2010, and at Jacksonville State University from 2011 to 2014.
