= Leo Gasienica =

American football player (born 1951)

Profile
- Position: Quarterback

Personal information
- Born: February 4, 1951 (age 75); Passaic, New Jersey, U.S.
- Listed height: 6 ft 3 in (1.91 m)
- Listed weight: 200 lb (91 kg)

Career information
- High school: Garfield
- College: Rutgers
- NFL draft: 1973: undrafted

Career history
- New York Giants (1973)*; Pittsburgh Steelers (1974)*; Birmingham Vulcans (1975)
- * Offseason or practice squad member only

Leo Gasienica (born February 4, 1951) is a former professional American football quarterback who played for Birmingham Vulcans in World Football League (WFL). He played college football at Rutgers University.

He also had stints in the National Football League (NFL) with the New York Giants and Pittsburgh Steelers.
