= Al Johnson (defensive back) =

American football player (born 1950)

No. 15
- Position: Defensive back / Running back

Personal information
- Born: June 17, 1950 (age 76); Baltimore, Maryland, U.S.
- Listed height: 6 ft 0 in (1.83 m)
- Listed weight: 200 lb (91 kg)

Career information
- High school: Frederick Douglass
- College: Cincinnati
- NFL draft: 1972: undrafted

Career history
- Houston Oilers (1972–1978)
- Stats at Pro Football Reference

Albert Alphonso Johnson Jr. is a retired professional American football player who played defensive back and running back for six seasons for the Houston Oilers.
