= 1971 Sugar Bowl =

American college football game

- 37th Sugar Bowl
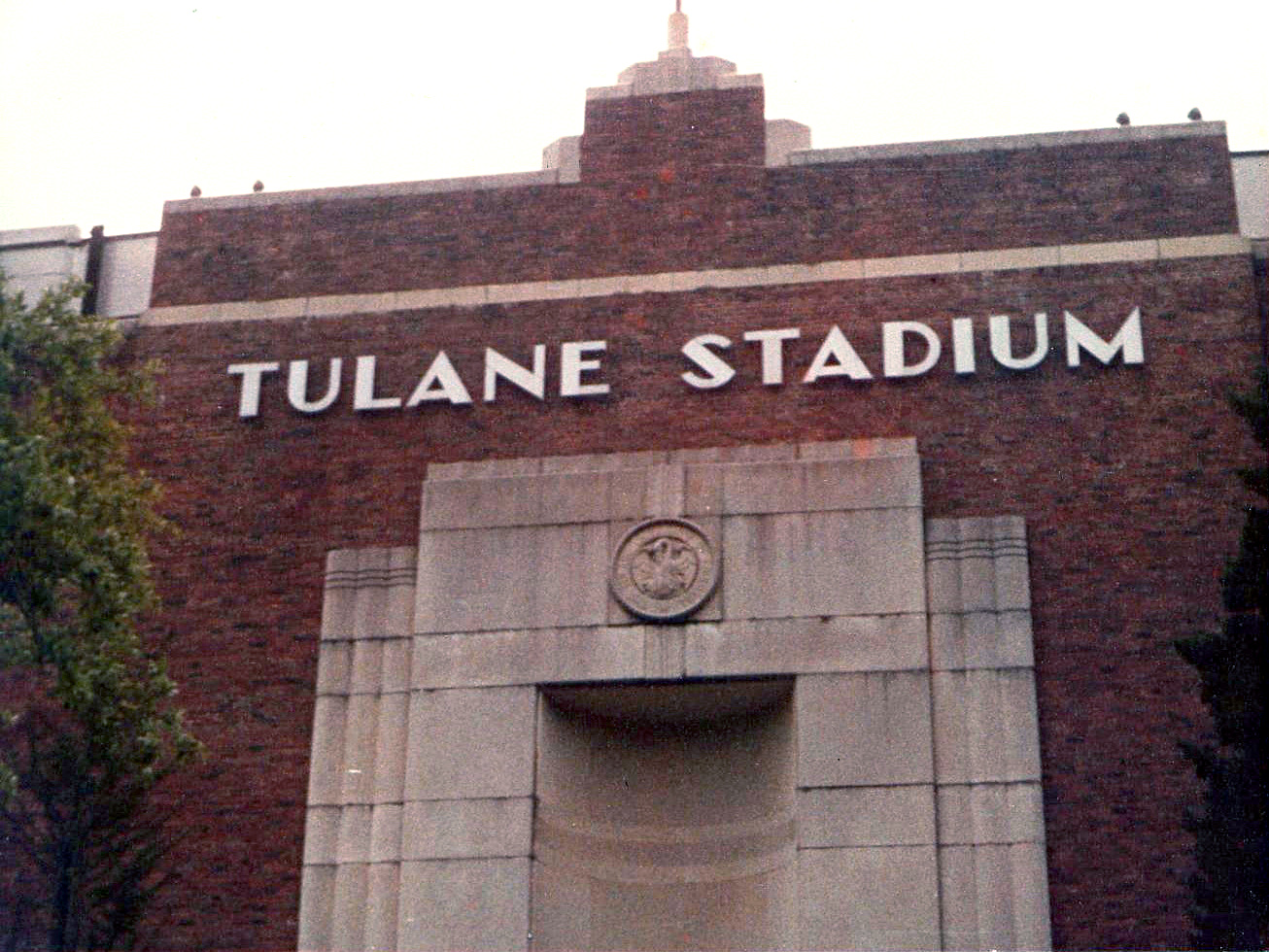
- Tulane Stadium in New Orleans, Louisiana, hosted the Sugar Bowl.
Air Force Falcons	Tennessee Volunteers
(9–2)	(10–1)
Independent	SEC
13	34
Head coach: Ben Martin	Head coach: Bill Battle
AP / Coaches; 11 / 11	AP / Coaches; 4 / 4
	1	2	3	4	Total
Air Force	7	0	6	0	13
Tennessee	24	0	7	3	34
- Date: January 1, 1971
- Season: 1970
- Stadium: Tulane Stadium
- Location: New Orleans, Louisiana
- MVP: Bobby Scott (Tennessee QB)
- Favorite: Tennessee by 10 points
- Referee: R. Pete Williams (SEC)
- Attendance: 75,087

United States TV coverage
- Network: ABC
- Announcers: Chris Schenkel, Bud Wilkinson

The 1971 Sugar Bowl was the 37th edition of the college football bowl game, played at Tulane Stadium in New Orleans, on Thursday, January 1. It featured the fourth-ranked Tennessee Volunteers of the Southeastern Conference (SEC), and the independent Air Force Falcons.

== Teams ==
=== Air Force ===
The Falcons were in their first Sugar Bowl under thirteenth-year head coach Ben Martin; he had a 68–57–7 record and brought Air Force into national prominence, ranked in the AP Poll for the second time in school history. However, the tenth-ranked Falcons lost their final regular season game 49–19 at home to Colorado. A week earlier, Air Force had defeated Pacific-8 champion Stanford, who later upset #2 Ohio State in the Rose Bowl.

=== Tennessee ===
Tennessee was under the leadership of 29-year old rookie coach Bill Battle, a member of the national champion 1961 Alabama Crimson Tide. This was the Vols' fifth Sugar Bowl appearance and first since the 1957 game. The Vols rolled over Alabama 24–0 at Knoxville in October (the Vols' last win vs. the Crimson Tide until 1982) and gained revenge for a 38–0 loss in 1969 to Ole Miss in November, but an early loss to Auburn in Birmingham wound up costing Tennessee a tie for the Southeastern Conference championship, which instead went outright to LSU when the Tigers defeated the Rebels 61-17 in their regular season finale.

The game was a match of offense vs defense. In the regular season, Air Force averaged 423.6 yards in offense, while Tennessee surrendered only 88.4 yards on defense.

== Game summary ==
Televised by ABC, the Sugar Bowl kicked off at 12 noon CST, an hour before the Cotton Bowl on CBS.

Quarterback Bobby Scott summed the game up with a quote after the game: "We had the momentum going." The Volunteers, not fooled by Air Force's eight-man line, drove 59 yards in 2 minutes and 45 seconds and culminated with a Don McLeary touchdown. It only grew worse for the Falcons as they fumbled on their ensuing drive, as the Vols added in a field goal by George Hunt soon after. Following an Air Force punt, the Vols drove down the field once again, driving 58 yards that culminated in McLeary's 2nd touchdown. A fumble by Air Force gave the ball back to the Vols at the Falcons' own 24. Four plays later, Scott passed to Gary Theiler for a touchdown. By this point, 3:12 was left in the first period, and it was 24–0. Air Force did later score in the quarter, happening on a fumble recovery by Darryl Hass in the endzone on a bad snap while the Vols were in their own territory. The second quarter went scoreless, as the demoralized Falcons trailed 24–7 at halftime.

The third quarter turned out to be worse. Bobby Majors returned an Air Force punt 57 yards for a touchdown. Air Force added in a measly touchdown later in the quarter, but by that point it was 31–13, and Hunt added in his second field goal to make the final score 34–13.

=== Scoring ===
First quarter

- TENN – Don McLeary 5-yard run (George Hunt kick)
- TENN – Hunt 30-yard field goal
- TENN – McLeary 20-yard run (Hunt kick)
- TENN – Gary Theiler 10-yard pass from Bobby Scott (Hunt kick)
- AFA – Darryl Haas fumble recovery in end zone (Barry kick)

Second quarter

No scoring

Third quarter

- TENN – Bobby Majors 57-yard punt return (Hunt kick)
- AFA – Bob Bassa 27-yard pass from Bob Parker (kick failed)

Fourth quarter

- TENN – Hunt 32-yard field goal

== Statistics ==
Statistics	Tennessee	Air Force
First downs	24	15
Yards rushing	42–86	24–(-12)
Passing	24–46–2	23–46–4
Yards passing	306	239
Total yards	88–392	70–227
Punts–Average	5–31.4	8–34.5
Fumbles–Lost	7–3	7–4
Turnovers	5	8
Penalties–Yards	6–74	0–0

== Aftermath ==
Air Force has not returned to the Sugar Bowl or any other bowl sponsored by the Bowl Championship Series and its successor, the College Football Playoff. Tennessee has returned twice, 1986 and 1991, where they defeated the Miami Hurricanes and the Virginia Cavaliers, respectively.

This was the final event at Tulane Stadium that was played on grass. Poly-Turf was installed in the summer of 1971 at the request of the National Football League after naming the stadium as the host of Super Bowl VI, and remained in place until the stadium was torn down at the end of 1979.
