= 1970 Astro-Bluebonnet Bowl =

Alabama Crimson Tide	Oklahoma Sooners
(6–5)	(7–4)
24	24
Head coach: Bear Bryant	Head coach: Chuck Fairbanks
	AP / Coaches; 20 / 15
	1	2	3	4	Total
Alabama	7	7	3	7	24
Oklahoma	7	14	0	3	24
- Date: December 31, 1970
- Season: 1970
- Stadium: Houston Astrodome
- Location: Houston, Texas
- Referee: Mel Sheehan (Big Eight; split crew: Big Eight, SEC)
- Attendance: 53,822

The 1970 Astro-Bluebonnet Bowl, part of the 1970 bowl game season took place on December 31, 1970, at the Houston Astrodome in Houston, Texas. The competing teams were the Alabama Crimson Tide, representing the Southeastern Conference (SEC), and the Oklahoma Sooners, representing the Big Eight Conference (Big 8). The game ended in a 24–24 tie.

== Teams ==
=== Alabama ===
The 1970 Alabama squad finished the regular season with a 6–5 record and losses against USC, Ole Miss, Tennessee, LSU and Auburn. During the week prior to the Iron Bowl, school officials announced the Crimson Tide accepted a bid to play in the Astro-Bluebonnet Bowl against Oklahoma. The appearance marked the second for Alabama in the Bluebonnet Bowl and their 24th overall bowl game appearance.

=== Oklahoma ===
The 1970 Oklahoma squad finished the regular season with a 7–4 record and losses against Oregon State, Texas, Kansas State and Nebraska. During the week prior to their Bedlam Series game against Oklahoma State, school officials announced the Sooners accepted a bid to play in the Astro-Bluebonnet Bowl against Alabama. The appearance marked the second for Oklahoma in the Bluebonnet Bowl and their 14th overall bowl game appearance.

== Game summary ==
Alabama opened the scoring early in the first when Scott Hunter connected with Randy Moore for a four-yard touchdown reception and a 7–0 lead. Oklahoma responded on the ensuing possession by driving 74 yards with Joe Wylie running it in from two yards out to tie the game at 7–7. The Sooners extended their lead to 21–7 with two long touchdown runs of 58 and 25 yards by Greg Pruitt. The Tide cut the lead to seven when Hunter hit David Bailey for a five-yard touchdown with only 0:14 remaining in the half. In the third, Richard Ciemny hit a 20-yard field goal to cut the lead further to 21–17. Alabama took the lead early in the fourth on a trick play. Hunter handed-off the ball to Johnny Musso who then threw a 25-yard touchdown pass back to Hunter to give the Crimson Tide a 24–21 lead. However, the game ended in a tie after Bruce Derr hit a 42-yard field goal late in the fourth. As Oklahoma was driving for a potential go ahead score Alabama called timeout. The Alabama Coach, Paul "Bear" Bryant called his entire defensive squad to the sidelines and rallied them to stop the drive and force the tying field goal.

Scoring summary

Quarter	Time	Drive			Team	Scoring information	Score	
Quarter	Time	Plays	Yards	TOP	Team	Scoring information	Alabama	Oklahoma
1	8:19		54 yards		Alabama	Randy Moore 4-yard touchdown reception from Scott Hunter, Richard Ciemny kick good	7	0
1			74 yards		Oklahoma	Joe Wylie 2-yard touchdown run, Bruce Derr kick good	7	7
2			5 plays, 80 yards		Oklahoma	Greg Pruitt 58-yard touchdown run, Bruce Derr kick good	7	14
2					Oklahoma	Greg Pruitt 25-yard touchdown run, Bruce Derr kick good	7	21
2	0:14				Alabama	David Bailey 5-yard touchdown reception from Scott Hunter, Richard Ciemny kick good	14	21
3					Alabama	20-yard field goal by Richard Ciemny	17	21
4					Alabama	Scott Hunter 25-yard touchdown reception from Johnny Musso, Richard Ciemny kick good	24	21
4					Oklahoma	42-yard field goal by Bruce Derr	24	24
"TOP" = time of possession. For other American football terms, see Glossary of American football.							24	24
