= 1971 Gator Bowl =

The 1971 Gator Bowl may refer to:

- 1971 Gator Bowl (January) - January 2, 1971, game between the Auburn Tigers and the Ole Miss Rebels
- 1971 Gator Bowl (December) - December 31, 1971, game between the Georgia Bulldogs and the North Carolina Tar Heels
