= Bill Battle =

American football player and coach (1941–2024)

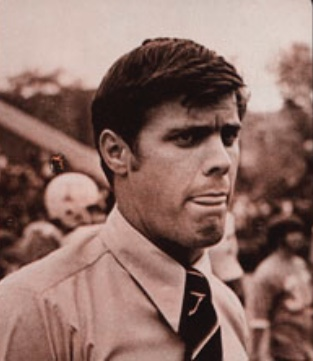
- Battle from the 1973 Volunteer

Biographical details
- Born: December 8, 1941; Birmingham, Alabama, U.S.
- Died: November 28, 2024 (aged 82)

Playing career
- 1960–1962: Alabama
- Position: End

Coaching career (HC unless noted)
- 1964–1965: Army (assistant)
- 1966–1969: Tennessee (ends)
- 1970–1976: Tennessee

Administrative career (AD unless noted)
- 2013–2017: Alabama

Head coaching record
- Overall: 59–22–2
- Bowls: 4–1

Accomplishments and honors

Championships
- National (1961)

William Raines Battle III (December 8, 1941 – November 28, 2024) was an American college athletics administrator, football coach, and sports marketing businessman. He played college football for the Alabama Crimson Tide and was head coach of the Tennessee Volunteers. Battle later served as athletic director at Alabama.

== Career ==
Battle played college football for Alabama from 1960 to 1962, as an offensive end. Battle was one of many of Bear Bryant's former players and assistant coaches who later became head coaches.

After graduation, he became an assistant football coach at Army (1964-1965), and then moved to Tennessee as offensive ends coach (1966-1969). When Doug Dickey left for Florida in 1970, Battle succeeded him as head football coach at Tennessee. At the time he began as head coach, he was at 28 the youngest college head coach in the country.

Battle had a 39-9 record in his first four years (1970-1973), but failed to continue Dickey's record of winning or contending for the Southeastern Conference championship. In the next three years (1974-1976), Tennessee was 20-13-2 (7-10-1 in conference play), and finished 8th in 1976.

Despite a 59–22–2 record in seven seasons, Battle was forced out after the 1976 season. He was replaced by Volunteer legend Johnny Majors, who had led Pittsburgh to the 1976 national championship.

Battle left coaching to work in sports licensing. In 1981, while working for Golden Eagle Enterprises in Selma, Alabama, Battle signed Bear Bryant to a licensing agreement. That year he founded Collegiate Licensing Company (CLC). The University of Alabama signed on as CLC's first university client. In 1983, Battle moved the company to Atlanta, Georgia.

In 2013, Alabama President Judy L. Bonner appointed him athletic director. He succeeded long-time director Mal Moore, who stepped down for health reasons at age 73. He retired as AD in 2017.

Battle was also a member of the group that votes in the Harris Interactive College Football Poll.

== Personal life and death ==
Battle was born in Birmingham, Alabama. Battle's father, William Raines "Bill" Battle Jr., was athletic director at Birmingham–Southern College from 1952 to 1974. His grandfather William Raines Battle was a Methodist minister.

In 1962, Battle was inducted into the Alabama chapter of "National Leadership Honor Society" Omicron Delta Kappa.

Battle died November 28, 2024, at the age of 82.

== Head coaching record ==
Year	Team	Overall	Conference	Standing	Bowl/playoffs	Coaches^{#}	AP^{°}
Tennessee Volunteers (Southeastern Conference) (1970–1976)
1970	Tennessee	11–1	4–1	2nd	W Sugar	4	4
1971	Tennessee	10–2	4–2	T–4th	W Liberty	9	9
1972	Tennessee	10–2	4–2	4th	W Astro-Bluebonnet	11	8
1973	Tennessee	8–4	3–3	4th	L Gator		19
1974	Tennessee	7–3–2	2–3–1	T–7th	W Liberty	15	20
1975	Tennessee	7–5	3–3	5th			
1976	Tennessee	6–5	2–4	8th			
Tennessee:		59–22–2	22–18–1				
Total:		59–22–2					
^{#}Rankings from final Coaches Poll.; ^{°}Rankings from final AP Poll.
