= 1970 Florida Gators football team =

American college football season

1970 Florida Gators football
- Conference: Southeastern Conference
- Record: 7–4 (3–3 SEC)
- Head coach: Doug Dickey (1st season)
- Offensive coordinator: Jimmy Dunn (1st season)
- Defensive coordinator: Doug Knotts (1st season)
- Captains: Mike Kelley; Donny Williams
- Home stadium: Florida Field

1970 Southeastern Conference football standings
	Conf.					Overall
Team	W		L		T	W		L		T
No. 7 LSU $	5	–	0	–	0	9	–	3	–	0
No. 4 Tennessee	4	–	1	–	0	11	–	1	–	0
No. 10 Auburn	5	–	2	–	0	9	–	2	–	0
No. 20 Ole Miss	4	–	2	–	0	7	–	4	–	0
Florida	3	–	3	–	0	7	–	4	–	0
Georgia	3	–	3	–	0	5	–	5	–	0
Alabama	3	–	4	–	0	6	–	5	–	1
Mississippi State	3	–	4	–	0	6	–	5	–	0
Vanderbilt	1	–	5	–	0	4	–	7	–	0
Kentucky	0	–	7	–	0	2	–	9	–	0
$ – Conference champion; Rankings from AP Poll

The 1970 Florida Gators football team represented the University of Florida during the 1970 NCAA University Division football season. The season was Florida alumnus Doug Dickey's first of nine as the new head coach of the Florida Gators football team. Dickey had been the starting quarterback for the Gators under coach Bob Woodruff in 1952 and 1953, and had previously served as the head coach of the Tennessee Volunteers before returning to his alma mater in 1970. Dickey's 1970 Florida Gators finished with a 7–4 overall record and a 3–3 record in the Southeastern Conference (SEC), tying for third among ten SEC teams.

== Schedule ==
Date	Opponent	Rank	Site	TV	Result	Attendance	Source
September 12	vs. Duke*	No. 15	Gator Bowl Stadium; Jacksonville, FL		W 21–19	53,841	
September 19	Mississippi State	No. 14	Florida Field; Gainesville, FL		W 34–13	55,674	
September 26	at Alabama	No. 13	Denny Stadium; Tuscaloosa, AL (rivalry)		L 15–46	58,138	
October 3	NC State*		Florida Field; Gainesville, FL		W 14–6	53,068	
October 10	at Florida State*		Doak Campbell Stadium; Tallahassee, FL (rivalry)		W 38–27	42,704	
October 17	Richmond*		Florida Field; Gainesville, FL		W 20–0	51,471	
October 24	at No. 11 Tennessee		Neyland Stadium; Knoxville, TN (rivalry)	ABC	L 7–38	64,069	
October 31	No. 12 Auburn		Florida Field; Gainesville, FL (rivalry)		L 14–63	63,560	
November 7	vs. Georgia		Gator Bowl Stadium; Jacksonville, FL (rivalry)	ABC	W 24–17	70,294	
November 14	vs. Kentucky		Tampa Stadium; Tampa, FL (rivalry)		W 24–13	45,102	
November 28	Miami (FL)*		Florida Field; Gainesville, FL (rivalry)		L 13–14	50,149	
*Non-conference game; Rankings from AP Poll released prior to the game

== Roster ==
1970 Florida Gators football team roster
Players
Coaches
Offense

Pos.	#	Name	Class
OL		Fred Abbott
WR	46	Carlos Alvarez	Jr
WR		Terry Ash
WR		Andy Cheney
TE		Jerry Coker
RB		Duane Doel
OL		Bill Dowdy
RB		Tommy Durrance
RB		Leonard George
WR		Bruce Gunter
TE		Charles Hood
OL		Dale Hutcherson
RB		Willie Jackson
OL		Richard Kensler
OL		David Peek
QB	7	John Reaves	Jr
RB		Mike Rich
QB		John Schnebly
RB		Jerry Vinesett
RB		Garry Walker
OL		Donnie Williams (C)
TE		Jim Yancey

Defense

Pos.	#	Name	Class
LB		Richard Buchanan
DB		Jack Burns
DB		Harvin Clark
DB		John Clifford
DL		Alan Cole
DB		John Faix
DL		Robert Harrell
LB		Mike Kelley (C)
LB		Joe Kelly
DL		Eddy Moore
LB		Gary Petersen
LB		Brad Powell
DB		John Silman
DB		Doug Sorensen
LB		Eric Taggert
DL		Danny Williams
DE	74	Jack Youngblood	Sr

Special teams

Pos.	#	Name	Class
K		Richard Franco	Jr
K		Jim Getzen	So
P	6	John James	So

Head coach

- Doug Dickey

Coordinators/assistant coaches

- Jimmy Dunn
- Doug Knotts

Legend

- (C) Team captain
- (S) Suspended
- (I) Ineligible
- Injured
- Redshirt
