= 1970 Alabama Crimson Tide football team =

American college football season

1970 Alabama Crimson Tide football

Astro-Bluebonnet Bowl, T 24–24 vs. Oklahoma
- Conference: Southeastern Conference
- Record: 6–5–1 (3–4 SEC)
- Head coach: Bear Bryant (13th season)
- Captains: Danny Gilbert; Dave Brungard
- Home stadium: Denny Stadium; Legion Field

1970 Southeastern Conference football standings
| | Conf. | | | | | Overall |
| Team | W | | L | | T | W | | L | | T |
|---|---|---|---|---|---|---|---|---|---|---|
| No. 7 LSU $ | 5 | – | 0 | – | 0 | 9 | – | 3 | – | 0 |
| No. 4 Tennessee | 4 | – | 1 | – | 0 | 11 | – | 1 | – | 0 |
| No. 10 Auburn | 5 | – | 2 | – | 0 | 9 | – | 2 | – | 0 |
| No. 20 Ole Miss | 4 | – | 2 | – | 0 | 7 | – | 4 | – | 0 |
| Florida | 3 | – | 3 | – | 0 | 7 | – | 4 | – | 0 |
| Georgia | 3 | – | 3 | – | 0 | 5 | – | 5 | – | 0 |
| Alabama | 3 | – | 4 | – | 0 | 6 | – | 5 | – | 1 |
| Mississippi State | 3 | – | 4 | – | 0 | 6 | – | 5 | – | 0 |
| Vanderbilt | 1 | – | 5 | – | 0 | 4 | – | 7 | – | 0 |
| Kentucky | 0 | – | 7 | – | 0 | 2 | – | 9 | – | 0 |
$ – Conference champion; Rankings from AP Poll

The 1970 Alabama Crimson Tide football team (variously "Alabama", "UA" or "Bama") represented the University of Alabama in the 1970 NCAA University Division football season. It was the Crimson Tide's 76th overall and 37th season as a member of the Southeastern Conference (SEC). The team was led by head coach Bear Bryant, in his 13th year, and played their home games at Denny Stadium in Tuscaloosa and Legion Field in Birmingham, Alabama. They finished season with six wins five losses and one tie (6–5–1 overall, 3–4 in the SEC) and with a tie against Oklahoma in the Astro-Bluebonnet Bowl.

As a result of a newly enacted rule by the NCAA that allowed teams to schedule an eleventh regular season game, Alabama opened the season against USC. Led by Sam Cunningham, the Trojans defeated the Crimson Tide 42–21 at Legion Field to open the season. Alabama rebounded from the loss and defeated Virginia Tech and Florida in consecutive games that set up a top-twenty match-up against Ole Miss. Led by Archie Manning, the Rebels defeated the Crimson Tide 48–23 after a 22-point fourth quarter at Jackson.

Alabama defeated Vanderbilt in their next game, but then were shut out for the first time since their 1959 season with a 24–0 loss at Tennessee. They again rebounded with a pair of consecutive victories. The first was against Houston, in what was also the first game Alabama played indoors, and the second on homecoming against Mississippi State. After a loss to LSU, the Crimson Tide defeated Miami in their final road game of the season. The win also made Alabama bowl-eligible, and as such an invitation to play Oklahoma in the Astro-Bluebonnet Bowl was accepted in the week leading to the Iron Bowl. Against Auburn, the Crimson tide surrendered a 17-point lead and closed the regular season with a 33–28 loss to their rival. A month later, Alabama ended their season with a 24–24 tie against the Sooners.

The 1970 season is also notable for being the first fully integrated team at Alabama. Although several African American students competed during spring practice in 1967, Wilbur Jackson became the first African American awarded a scholarship to play for Alabama, and he competed as a member of the freshman squad in 1970.

== Schedule ==
| Date | Opponent | Rank | Site | TV | Result | Attendance |
|---|---|---|---|---|---|---|
| September 12 | No. 3 USC* | No. 16 | Legion Field; Birmingham, AL | | L 21–42 | 72,175 |
| September 19 | Virginia Tech* | | Legion Field; Birmingham, AL | | W 51–18 | 53,958 |
| September 26 | No. 13 Florida | | Denny Stadium; Tuscaloosa, AL (rivalry) | | W 46–15 | 58,138 |
| October 3 | at No. 7 Ole Miss | No. 17 | Mississippi Veterans Memorial Stadium; Jackson, MS (rivalry) | ABC | L 23–48 | 46,812 |
| October 10 | Vanderbilt | | Denny Stadium; Tuscaloosa, AL | | W 35–11 | 49,038 |
| October 17 | at No. 14 Tennessee | | Neyland Stadium; Knoxville, TN (Third Saturday in October) | | L 0–24 | 64,947 |
| October 24 | at No. 15 Houston* | | Houston Astrodome; Houston, TX | | W 30–21 | 46,869 |
| October 31 | Mississippi State^{†} | | Denny Stadium; Tuscaloosa, AL (rivalry) | | W 35–6 | 58,843 |
| November 7 | No. 11 LSU | No. 19 | Legion Field; Birmingham, AL (rivalry) | ABC | L 9–14 | 60,371 |
| November 14 | at Miami (FL)* | | Miami Orange Bowl; Miami, FL | | W 32–8 | 25,469 |
| November 28 | vs. No. 11 Auburn | | Legion Field; Birmingham, AL (Iron Bowl) | | L 28–33 | 71,747 |
| December 31 | vs. No. 20 Oklahoma* | | Houston Astrodome; Houston, TX (Astro-Bluebonnet Bowl) | ABC | T 24–24 | 53,822 |
*Non-conference game; ^{†}Homecoming; Rankings from AP Poll released prior to the game

== Game summaries ==
=== USC ===
| Team | 1 | 2 | 3 | 4 | Total |
|---|---|---|---|---|---|
| • #3 USC | 12 | 10 | 10 | 10 | 42 |
| #16 Alabama | 0 | 7 | 6 | 8 | 21 |

- Date: September 12
- Location: Legion Field
  Birmingham, AL
- Game attendance: 72,175

After the NCAA enacted a rule that allowed its member institutions to schedule an eleventh regular season game, in January 1970 the Crimson Tide agreed to a home-and-home series with the University of Southern California (USC). At Legion Field, the Trojans outgained Alabama on the ground 485 to 32 yards en route to a 42–21 victory that opened the 1970 season. USC took a 12–0 first quarter lead behind a pair of Sam Cunningham touchdowns as they outgained the Crimson Tide 102 to 10 in total yards in the quarter. After a 32-yard, Ron Ayala field goal extended the Trojans' lead to 15–0, a one-yard Johnny Musso touchdown run cut the USC lead to 15–7 early in the second quarter. However, the Trojans responded on the drive that ensued with a seven-yard Charlie Evans touchdown run that made the halftime score 22–7.

The Trojans continued their dominance of the game into the second half as they extended their lead to 32–7 in the third quarter. Jimmy Jones first threw a 23-yard touchdown pass to Clarence Davis and Ayala next connected on a 25-yard field goal. Alabama then responded with a six-yard Neb Hayden touchdown pass to David Bailey that made the score 32–13 at the end of the third quarter. The Trojans closed the game with a 27-yard Ayala field goal and a six-yard Mike Rae touchdown pass to Bill Holland. Alabama then made the final score 42–21 on a second, one-yard Musso touchdown run.

The game became referred to as the "Cunningham game" by many Alabama fans and is often cited as being the turning point towards the full integration of the Crimson Tide football team beginning with the 1971 season. However, Alabama football had actually begun integrating in 1967, when five black students attempted to walk-on. Moreover, the team was already integrated by 1970, as Wilbur Jackson was a freshman on the team. This game was also the first Alabama played on Poly-Turf at Legion Field as it was installed during the previous summer.

=== Virginia Tech ===
| Team | 1 | 2 | 3 | 4 | Total |
|---|---|---|---|---|---|
| Virginia Tech | 0 | 6 | 12 | 0 | 18 |
| • Alabama | 17 | 13 | 14 | 7 | 51 |

- Date: September 19
- Location: Legion Field
  Birmingham, AL
- Game attendance: 53,958

The 51 points scored by Alabama against Virginia Tech, were the most allowed by a Hokies team coached by Jerry Claiborne in this 51–18 victory at Legion Field. The Crimson Tide took control of the game early as they raced out to a 17–0 lead in the first quarter. After Richard Ciemny connected on a 36-yard field goal, Dave Brungard scored on a 21-yard run and was followed with a 14-yard Scott Hunter touchdown pass to Jerry Cash. Alabama extended their lead further to 30–0 after Johnny Musso threw an 11-yard touchdown pass to David Bailey and Tommy Wade had a 71-yard punt return for a score. The Hokies managed to score late in the period on an eight-yard Gil Schwabe touchdown pass to Perry Tiberio that made the halftime score 30–6.

Much to the surprise of coach Bryant, Virginia Tech rallied early in the third quarter and scored a pair of touchdowns that brought the score to 30–18. John Dobbins scored first for the Hokies on a one-yard run and was followed with a four-yard Rich Matijevich touchdown reception from Schwabe. The Crimson Tide responded with three unanswered touchdowns to close the game first on 20-yard Brungard run, next on a 10-yard Hunter pass to Joe LaBue and finally on a 36-yard Buddy Seay run.

=== Florida ===
| Team | 1 | 2 | 3 | 4 | Total |
|---|---|---|---|---|---|
| #13 Florida | 0 | 7 | 0 | 8 | 15 |
| • Alabama | 10 | 7 | 7 | 22 | 46 |

- Date: September 26
- Location: Denny Stadium
  Tuscaloosa, AL
- Game attendance: 58,138

As they entered conference opener against Florida, the Gators were ranked No. 13 in the AP Poll. In the game, Alabama led throughout and after a 22-point fourth quarter defeated the Gators 46–15 in the first Denny Stadium game of the season. The Crimson Tide took a 10–0 first quarter lead behind a one-yard Neb Hayden touchdown run and a 33-yard Richard Ciemny field goal before the Gators responded with a nine-yard John Reaves touchdown pass to Michael Rich early in the second quarter. Alabama responded with a 15-yard Scott Hunter touchdown pass to Dave Brungard that made the halftime score 17–7.

After a 10-yard Neb Hayden touchdown pass to Griff Langston in the third extended the Crimson Tide lead to 24–7, they outscored Florida 22–8 in the fourth quarter for the 46–15 victory. In the final period Crimson Tide touchdowns were scored on runs of six-yards by Johnny Musso, three-yards by Buddy Seay and 13-yards by Terry Davis. The Gators scored their final points on a one-yard Leonard George touchdown run.

=== Ole Miss ===
| Team | 1 | 2 | 3 | 4 | Total |
|---|---|---|---|---|---|
| #17 Alabama | 0 | 9 | 8 | 6 | 23 |
| • #7 Ole Miss | 14 | 12 | 0 | 22 | 48 |

- Date: October 3
- Location: Memorial Stadium
  Jackson, MS
- Game attendance: 46,812

After their victory over Florida, Alabama reentered the AP Poll at the No. 17 position and Ole Miss dropped from No. 5 to No. 7 in the week prior to their match-up at Jackson. Against the Rebels, the Crimson Tide were defeated 48–23 behind a strong performance by Ole Miss quarterback Archie Manning before a nationally televised audience. The Rebels took a 14–0 first quarter lead after Manning threw a seven-yard touchdown pass to Garland Reed and later scored on a one-yard touchdown run. Alabama scored their first points on a 36-yard Richard Ciemny field goal early in the second quarter. However, on the kickoff that ensued, Vernon Studdard returned it 101-yards for a touchdown and extended the Ole Miss lead to 20–3 after the conversion failed. Both teams then traded touchdowns to close the first half. Manning connected from 14-yards to Reed for the Rebels and Neb Hayden connected from 15-yards to Jerry Cash for Alabama that made the halftime score 26–9.

The Crimson Tide were able to cut the Ole Miss lead to 26–17 on a ten-yard Hayden pass to Johnny Musso in the third quarter. The Rebels responded in the fourth with three touchdowns and outscored Alabama 22–6 in the quarter en route to the 48–23 victory. Ole Miss points were scored on an eight-yard Manning pass to Studdard, a 14-yard Manning run and on a one-yard William. R. Knight run; Alabama scored their lone touchdown on a 19-yard Hayden pass to Stephen Doran.

=== Vanderbilt ===
| Team | 1 | 2 | 3 | 4 | Total |
|---|---|---|---|---|---|
| Vanderbilt | 0 | 0 | 3 | 8 | 11 |
| • Alabama | 7 | 7 | 21 | 0 | 35 |

- Date: October 10
- Location: Denny Stadium
  Tuscaloosa, AL
- Game attendance: 49,038

After their loss against the Rebels, Alabama out of the AP Poll prior to their game against Vanderbilt. Against the Commodores, Alabama out-rushed Vandy 344 to 71 yards en route to a 35–11 victory at Tuscaloosa. The Crimson Tide took a 14–0 lead into halftime after touchdowns were scored on a two-yard George Ranager run in the first and on an 11-yard Neb Hayden pass to David Bailey in the second quarter. After Alabama extended their lead to 28–0 in the third quarter on a 93-yard Buddy Seay kickoff return and a two-yard Johnny Musso touchdown run, Vanderbilt scored their first points on a 31-yard Robert Bayless field goal. The game then closed with touchdown on a four-yard Neb Hayden run for the Crimson Tide in the third and on a four-yard Steve Burger run for Vanderbilt in the fourth quarter.

=== Tennessee ===
Third Saturday in October

| Team | 1 | 2 | 3 | 4 | Total |
|---|---|---|---|---|---|
| Alabama | 0 | 0 | 0 | 0 | 0 |
| • #14 Tennessee | 7 | 0 | 7 | 10 | 24 |

- Date: October 17
- Location: Neyland Stadium
  Knoxville, TN
- Game attendance: 64,947

At Tennessee, Alabama quarterbacks collectively threw eight interceptions in this 24–0 loss to the Volunteers. Tennessee took a 7–0 lead into halftime after they scored the only first half points on a one-yard Bobby Scott touchdown run. The Vols then closed the game with a four-yard Don McLeary touchdown run in the third, a 35-yard George Hunt field goal and a 22-yard Jackie Walker interception return in the fourth quarter.

Scott Hunter threw five and Neb Hayden threw three interceptions in the game. Hunter's five and the eight combined stand as school records for interceptions in a single game. The shutout loss was their first since their 7–0 loss against Penn State during their 1959 season that ended a 115-game streak.

=== Houston ===
| Team | 1 | 2 | 3 | 4 | Total |
|---|---|---|---|---|---|
| • Alabama | 3 | 14 | 3 | 10 | 30 |
| #15 Houston | 7 | 7 | 7 | 0 | 21 |

- Date: October 24
- Location: Astrodome
  Houston, TX
- Game attendance: 46,869

In what was the first game the Crimson Tide played indoors, Alabama upset the Houston Cougars 30–21 on homecoming at the Astrodome. After Richard Ciemny gave Alabama an early 3–0 lead with his 28-yard field goal, the Cougars responded with a 13-yard Gary Mullins touchdown pass to Elmo Wright that made the score 7–3 at the end of the first quarter. The Crimson Tide then retook a 17–7 lead with a pair of second quarter touchdowns. The first came on an 18-yard Johnny Musso pass to David Bailey and the second on a 36-yard Dave Brungard run. The Cougars managed their second touchdown on a three-yard Mullins to Wright pass that made the halftime score 17–14.

Houston then took a 21–17 lead early in the third quarter on a one-yard Tom Mozisek run. After a 34-yard Ciemny field goal bought Alabama within one point of the lead later in the quarter, his 40-yard field goal in the fourth gave the Crimson Tide a 23–21 lead. Steve Higginbotham then made the final score 30–21 late in the game after he returned an interception 80-yards for a touchdown.

=== Mississippi State ===
| Team | 1 | 2 | 3 | 4 | Total |
|---|---|---|---|---|---|
| Mississippi State | 0 | 0 | 0 | 6 | 6 |
| • Alabama | 7 | 14 | 14 | 0 | 35 |

- Date: October 31
- Location: Denny Stadium
  Tuscaloosa, AL
- Game attendance: 58,843

On homecoming in Tuscaloosa, Alabama defeated the Mississippi State Bulldogs 35–6. After the Crimson Tide took a 7–0 lead on a 13-yard Johnny Musso run in the first, a pair of second quarter touchdowns made the halftime score 21–0. The pair were scored on running plays of ten-yards by George Ranager and one-yard by Musso. Alabama then scored their final pair of touchdowns in the third on runs of 14-yards Dave Brungard and three-yards by Musso. Up 35–0, Alabama closed the game with many of its reserves seeing playing time in the fourth quarter. It was in that period that the Bulldogs ended the bid for a shutout when Joe Reed threw a 19-yard touchdown pass to David Smith and made the final score 35–6.

=== LSU ===
| Team | 1 | 2 | 3 | 4 | Total |
|---|---|---|---|---|---|
| • #11 LSU | 0 | 7 | 7 | 0 | 14 |
| #19 Alabama | 3 | 0 | 0 | 6 | 9 |

- Date: November 7
- Location: Legion Field
  Birmingham, AL
- Game attendance: 60,371

After their victory over Mississippi State, Alabama reentered the AP Poll at the No. 19 position and LSU was in the No. 11 position in the week prior to their match-up at Birmingham. Playing in a regionally televised game, Alabama was defeated by the Tigers 14–9 at Legion Field. Richard Ciemny gave Alabama an early 3–0 lead with his 23-yard field goal in the first, but the Tigers responded with a two-yard Arthur Cantrelle touchdown run in the second quarter that gave LSU a 7–3 halftime lead. The Tigers extended their lead further to 14–3 after Felix Lee threw a two-yard touchdown pass to Jimmy LeDoux in the third quarter. Although the Crimson Tide defense had a goal line stand that prevented a late LSU score, the offense only scored once more on a ten-yard Scott Hunter touchdown pass to David Bailey that made the final score 14–9.

=== Miami (FL) ===
| Team | 1 | 2 | 3 | 4 | Total |
|---|---|---|---|---|---|
| • Alabama | 0 | 14 | 7 | 11 | 32 |
| Miami | 0 | 0 | 0 | 8 | 8 |

- Date: November 14
- Location: Orange Bowl
  Miami, FL
- Game attendance: 25,469

After their loss to LSU, Alabama again dropped out of the AP Poll for the week of their game at Miami. On homecoming in Miami, Alabama defeated Hurricanes 32–8 at the Orange Bowl and with their sixth victory of the season became bowl eligible. After a scoreless first quarter, the Crimson Tide took a 14–0 halftime lead after they scored a pair of second quarter touchdowns. The first came when Lanny Norris intercepted a Kelly Cochrane pass and returned it 31-yards for the first score followed with the second on a 21-yard Scott Hunter touchdown pass to Jerry Cash later in the quarter.

After George Ranager extended the Alabama lead to 21–0 with his five-yard run in the third, Miami scored their only points on a four-yard Cochrane pass to Steve Schaap early in the fourth quarter that made the score 21–8. The Crimson Tide then closed the game with a 32-yard Richard Ciemny field goal and a four-yard Cash touchdown run that made the final score 32–8.

=== Auburn ===
Iron Bowl

| Team | 1 | 2 | 3 | 4 | Total |
|---|---|---|---|---|---|
| • #11 Auburn | 0 | 10 | 7 | 16 | 33 |
| Alabama | 17 | 0 | 0 | 11 | 28 |

- Date: November 28
- Location: Legion Field
  Birmingham, AL
- Game attendance: 71,747

In their final regular season game, the Auburn Tigers rallied from a 17-point, first quarter deficit and defeated Alabama 33–28 in the annual Iron Bowl at Legion Field. The Crimson Tide took a 17–0 first quarter lead behind a 14-yard Johnny Musso touchdown run, a 31-yard Scott Hunter touchdown pass to David Bailey and a 26-yard Richard Ciemny field goal. Auburn responded with a one-yard Pat Sullivan touchdown run and a 26-yard Gardner Jett field goal in the second quarter that made the halftime score 17–10.

Sullivan then tied the game 17–17 with his seven-yard touchdown run in the third quarter. With the game tied as the teams entered the fourth quarter, both traded field goals and made the score 20–20 before Sullivan threw a 17-yard touchdown pass to Robby Robinett that gave the Tigers their first lead of the game. Alabama responded with a 54-yard Hunter touchdown pass to George Ranager, then made a two-point conversion and took a 28–27 lead. However, Sullivan led Auburn to the game-winning touchdown scored on a three-yard Wallace Clark run for the 33–28 victory.

=== Oklahoma ===
Bluebonnet Bowl

| Team | 1 | 2 | 3 | 4 | Total |
|---|---|---|---|---|---|
| Alabama | 7 | 7 | 3 | 7 | 24 |
| Oklahoma | 7 | 14 | 0 | 3 | 24 |

- Date: December 31
- Location: Astrodome
  Houston, TX
- Game attendance: 53,822

On November 21, Alabama accepted an invitation to play in the Astro-Bluebonnet Bowl against Oklahoma of the Big Eight Conference on New Year's Eve. Against the Sooners, Alabama played to a 24–24 tie in the 12th annual Astro-Bluebonnet Bowl. After the Crimson Tide took an early 7–0 lead on a four-yard Scott Hunter touchdown pass to Randy Moore, the Sooners scored the next three touchdowns en route to a 21–7 lead. After Joe Wylie scored on a two-yard run in the first, Greg Pruitt scored a pair of second quarter touchdowns on long runs of 58 and 25 yards. Alabama responded with a five-yard Hunter touchdown pass to David Baily and made the halftime score 21–14.

After a 20-yard Richard Ciemny field goal in the third brought the Crimson Tide within four points of the Sooners, they took a 24–21 lead on a 25-yard Hunter touchdown pass to Johnny Musso in the fourth quarter. Oklahoma managed to tie the game 24–24 late in the fourth on a 42-yard Bruce Derr field goal. However, Alabama had a chance to win as time expired, but the 34-yard Ciemny attempt sailed wide left and the game ended in the tie.

== NFL draft ==
Several players that were varsity lettermen from the 1970 squad were drafted into the National Football League (NFL) in the 1971, 1972 and 1973 drafts. These players included:

| Year | Round | Overall | Player name | Position | NFL team |
|---|---|---|---|---|---|
| 1971 NFL draft | 6 | 140 | Scott Hunter | Quarterback | Green Bay Packers |
| 1972 NFL draft | 3 | 62 | Johnny Musso | Running back | Chicago Bears |
| 1972 NFL draft | 11 | 266 | David Bailey | Wide receiver | Green Bay Packers |
| 1972 NFL draft | 15 | 386 | Robin Parkhouse | Linebacker | Baltimore Colts |
| 1972 NFL draft | 16 | 411 | Steve Higginbottom | Defensive back | Washington Redskins |
| 1973 NFL draft | 1 | 4 | John Hannah | Offensive guard | New England Patriots |
| 1973 NFL draft | 7 | 174 | John Mitchell | Defensive end | San Francisco 49ers |
| 1973 NFL draft | 12 | 309 | Jim Krapf | Guard | Oakland Raiders |

== Freshman squad ==
Prior to the 1972 NCAA University Division football season, NCAA rules prohibited freshmen from participating on the varsity team, and as such many schools fielded freshmen teams. The Alabama freshmen squad was led by coach Clem Gryska for the 1970 season and finished undefeated with a record of five wins and zero losses (5–0). The 1970 squad was notable as the team included Wilbur Jackson, the first African American to compete on scholarship for the Crimson Tide.

The Baby Tide opened their season on a Monday afternoon with a 24–7 victory over Mississippi State at Denny Stadium. After Alabama scored their first points on a 28-yard Paul Spivey touchdown run, State responded with their only points on a 27-yard Paul Millsaps touchdown pass to Bill Buckley that made the score 7–7 at the end of the first quarter. The Baby Tide responded with a 34-yard Greg Gantt field goal in the second and took a 10–7 halftime lead. Alabama closed the game with touchdowns on a one-yard David McMakin run in the third and a ten-yard Mike Harter run in the fourth quarter. Wilbur Jackson saw limited playing time only on special teams due to an ankle injury and the Bulldogs had six turnovers in the loss. In their second contest, Alabama defeated Vanderbilt 38–7 at Dudley Field in Nashville. Paul Spivey starred for the Baby Tide in the game with four touchdowns and 112 rushing yards on 20 carries in the victory.

Against Ole Miss, Alabama rallied from a 20-point, first quarter deficit and defeated the Rebels 41–28 at Oxford. The Rebels took their 20–0 on a trio of touchdowns scored by Mickey Fratesi when he returned the opening kickoff 100-yards and on touchdown runs 11-yards by Gene Allen and one-yard by Fratesi. Alabama responded in the second with Paul Spivey touchdown runs of 19 and 12-yards that made the halftime score 20–14. They then took a 21–20 lead early in the third after Gary Rutledge threw a 37-yard touchdown pass to Geary Eason. Touchdown runs of seven-yards by Richard Bryan and four-yards by Rutledge extended the Alabama lead to 35–20 at the end of the third quarter. After Alabama scored their final points on a 22-yard Mike Harter touchdown run, Ole Miss made the final score 41–28 after they had a safety and scored on a 31-yard Kenny Lyons touchdown pass to Danny Harris.

Against Tennessee, the Baby Tide won 28–20 behind a strong performance by defensive back Jimmy Dawson. The game was tied 7–7 at halftime after Paul Spivey scored on a two-yard run in the first for Alabama and Chip Howard threw a 39-yard touchdown pass to Steve Chancey in the second quarter for Tennessee. After the teams traded touchdowns in the third quarter, and Gary Rutledge went on and scored the game-winning touchdown on a short run with just over one minute left in the game for the 28–20 victory. Alabama then closed the season with a 9–3 victory over rival Auburn before 7,000 fans at Denny Stadium. After the teams traded first half field goals, Gary Rutledge scored the game-winning touchdown on a five-yard run in the fourth quarter.

== Roster ==
1970 Alabama Crimson Tide football team roster
Players
Coaches
Offense

| Pos. | # | Name | Class |
|---|---|---|---|
| HB | | Wayne Adkinson | So |
| SE | | David Bailey | Jr |
| FB | | Ellis Beck | So |
| C | | Clarence Brasher | So |
| FB | | Dave Brungard | Sr |
| OT | | Clyde Butler | Sr |
| FB | | Jesse Causey | So |
| E | | Jerry Cash | Sr |
| FB | | Phil Chaffin | Sr |
| OT | | Don Cokely | Jr |
| OT | | Jerry Cooper | So |
| G | | Wayne Cotton | So |
| OT | | Allen Cox | So |
| QB | | Terry Davis | So |
| TB | | Steve Dean | So |
| C | | Ken Deaton | Jr |
| G | | Reid Drinkard | Sr |
| TE | | Stephen Doran | Sr |
| G | | Mike Eckenrod | So |
| G | | Tommy Ford | So |
| C | | Jimmy Grammer | Sr |
| G | | Woody Garner | Jr |
| G | | Mike Hand | Sr |
| OT | | John Hannah | So |
| QB | | Neb Hayden | Sr |
| TB | | Larry Helm | Sr |
| QB | | Butch Hobson | So |
| SE | | Jimmy Horton | So |
| G | | Morris Hunt | So |
| QB | | Scott Hunter | Sr |
| G | | Woodward Husband | Sr |
| OT | | Ken James | Sr |
| TB | | Joe LaBue | So |
| SE | | Griff Langston | Sr |
| SE | | Lane Lawley | Sr |
| TE | | Randy Moore | So |
| TB | | Johnny Musso | Jr |
| QB | | Ricky Pitalo | So |
| C | | Pat Raines | So |
| SE | | George Ranager | Sr |
| TB | | Ron Richardson | Jr |
| QB | | Benny Rippetoe | Jr |
| OT | | Jimmy Rosser | Jr |
| SE | | Bubba Sawyer | Jr |
| TB | | Buddy Seay | Sr |
| QB | | Billy Sexton | So |
| QB | | Johnny Sharpless | So |
| TE | | Jim Simmons | Jr |
| SE | | Rod Steakley | Sr |
| TB | | Tommy Stringfellow | Jr |
| SE | | Buddy Talley | So |
| C | | Carey Varnado | So |
| G | | Larry Waldron | Jr |
| SE | | Wayne Wheeler | So |
| G | | Jack White | Jr |
| SE | | Dexter Wood | So |

Defense

| Pos. | # | Name | Class |
|---|---|---|---|
| DL | | Marvin Barron | So |
| DL | | Jeff Beard | Jr |
| DB | | Eddie Bentley | Sr |
| DB | | Bill Blair | Sr |
| DB | | Jeff Blitz | So |
| DL | | Buddy Brown | So |
| DL | | Richard Burke | So |
| LB | | Andy Cross | So |
| DE | | John Croyle | So |
| DL | | Mike Denson | So |
| DB | | Ken Emerson | Sr |
| DL | | Doug Faust | So |
| LB | | Danny Gilbert | Sr |
| LB | | Wayne Hall | So |
| DL | | Don Harris | Sr |
| DB | | Steve Higginbotham | Jr |
| DE | | Ed Hines | Jr |
| DB | | David Knapp | So |
| LB | | Jim Krapf | So |
| DE | | Tom Lusk | So |
| DB | | Bob McKinney | So |
| DB | | Lanny Norris | So |
| DE | | Robin Parkhouse | Jr |
| DL | | Jim Patterson | Jr |
| LB | | Alec Pittman | Jr |
| DE | | Cecil Quick | So |
| DE | | Wayne Rhoads | Sr |
| LB | | Jeff Rouzie | So |
| DB | | Robby Rowan | So |
| DL | | Terry Rowell | Jr |
| LB | | Bobby Stanford | Jr |
| LB | | Billy Strickland | Sr |
| LB | | Tom Surlas | Jr |
| DB | | Carl Tayloe | So |
| DE | | Chris Tyra | So |
| LB | | Reid Underwood | So |
| DB | | Steve Wade | So |
| DB | | Tommy Wade | Sr |
| DL | | Mitchell Weaver | So |
| DB | | Steve Williams | Jr |
| LB | | Glenn Woodruff | So |

Special teams

| Pos. | # | Name | Class |
|---|---|---|---|
| PK | | Richard Ciemny | Sr |
| PK | | Frank Mann | Sr |

Head coach

- Bear Bryant (13th year, Alabama)

Coordinators/assistant coaches

- John David Crow (2nd year, Texas A&M)
- Ken Donahue (7th year, Tennessee)
- Pat Dye (6th year, Georgia)
- Jim Goostree (14th year, Tennessee)
- Clem Gryska (11th year, Alabama)
- Dude Hennessey 11th year, Kentucky)
- Mal Moore (7th year, Alabama)
- Dee Powell (7th year, Texas A&M)
- Tom Rogers (5th year, Delta State)
- Jack Rutledge (5th year, Alabama)
- Jimmy Sharpe (8th year, Alabama)
- Steve Sloan (3rd year, Alabama)
- Richard Williamson (7th year, Alabama)

Legend

- (C) Team captain
- (S) Suspended
- (I) Ineligible
- Injured
- Redshirt

Roster
Last update: October 15, 2013
