= 1970 Mississippi State Bulldogs football team =

American college football season

1970 Mississippi State Bulldogs football
- Conference: Southeastern Conference
- Record: 6–5 (3–4 SEC)
- Head coach: Charles Shira (4th season)
- Home stadium: Scott Field; Mississippi Veterans Memorial Stadium

1970 Southeastern Conference football standings
	Conf.					Overall
Team	W		L		T	W		L		T
No. 7 LSU $	5	–	0	–	0	9	–	3	–	0
No. 4 Tennessee	4	–	1	–	0	11	–	1	–	0
No. 10 Auburn	5	–	2	–	0	9	–	2	–	0
No. 20 Ole Miss	4	–	2	–	0	7	–	4	–	0
Florida	3	–	3	–	0	7	–	4	–	0
Georgia	3	–	3	–	0	5	–	5	–	0
Alabama	3	–	4	–	0	6	–	5	–	1
Mississippi State	3	–	4	–	0	6	–	5	–	0
Vanderbilt	1	–	5	–	0	4	–	7	–	0
Kentucky	0	–	7	–	0	2	–	9	–	0
$ – Conference champion; Rankings from AP Poll

The 1970 Mississippi State Bulldogs football team represented Mississippi State University during the 1970 NCAA University Division football season. The Bulldogs finished 6–5 for the only winning season in head coach Charles Shira's tenure. The 1970 squad included the first two African-American football players on the Bulldogs' varsity team, defensive back Frank Dowsing and defensive tackle Robert Bell.

== Schedule ==
Date	Opponent	Site	Result	Attendance	Source
September 12	Oklahoma State*	Mississippi Veterans Memorial Stadium; Jackson, MS	W 14–13	34,000	
September 19	at No. 14 Florida	Florida Field; Gainesville, FL	L 13–34	55,674	
September 26	vs. Vanderbilt	Memphis Memorial Stadium; Memphis, TN	W 20–6	16,615	
October 3	Georgia	Mississippi Veterans Memorial Stadium; Jackson, MS	W 7–6	25,044	
October 10	Houston*	Scott Field; Starkville, MS	L 14–31	28,000	
October 17	No. 17 Texas Tech*	Mississippi Veterans Memorial Stadium; Jackson, MS	W 20–16	19,050	
October 24	Southern Miss*	Scott Field; Starkville, MS	W 51–15	33,000	
October 31	at Alabama	Denny Stadium; Tuscaloosa, AL (rivalry)	L 6–35	58,843	
November 7	at No. 10 Auburn	Legion Field; Birmingham, AL	L 0–56	45,000	
November 14	at No. 9 LSU	Tiger Stadium; Baton Rouge, LA (rivalry)	L 7–38	64,000	
November 26	at No. 10 Ole Miss	Hemingway Stadium; Oxford, MS (Egg Bowl)	W 19–14	35,000	
*Non-conference game; Rankings from AP Poll released prior to the game
