= Collegiate Licensing Company =

American licensing and marketing company

- Type: Subsidiary
- Founded: 1981
- Headquarters: Atlanta, Georgia, United States
- Number of locations: 6
- Key people: Bill Battle, Founder & Chairman; Cory Moss, Senior Vice President and Managing Director
- Number of employees: 80
- Parent: IMG College
- Website: www.clc.com

The Collegiate Licensing Company (CLC) is an American collegiate trademark licensing and marketing company. Founded in 1981 by Bill Battle in Selma, Alabama, CLC is the largest and oldest collegiate licensing company in the United States and currently provides its services to more than 200 colleges and universities, athletic conferences, bowl games, the Heisman Trophy, and the NCAA. Headquartered in Atlanta, the company also operates satellite offices in Arizona, Kansas, and Montana. On May 1, 2007, CLC was acquired by IMG.

CLC products contain a hologram tag asserting authenticity.
