= Scott Hunter (American football) =

American football player (born 1947)

No. 16, 10
- Position: Quarterback

Personal information
- Born: November 19, 1947 (age 78); Mobile, Alabama, U.S.
- Listed height: 6 ft 2 in (1.88 m)
- Listed weight: 205 lb (93 kg)

Career information
- High school: Vigor (Prichard, Alabama)
- College: Alabama
- NFL draft: 1971: 6th round, 140th overall pick

Career history
- Green Bay Packers (1971–1973); Buffalo Bills (1974); Atlanta Falcons (1976–1978); Detroit Lions (1979)

Career NFL statistics
- Passing attempts: 748
- Passing completions: 335
- Completion percentage: 44.8%
- TD–INT: 23–38
- Passing yards: 4,756
- Passer rating: 55
- Stats at Pro Football Reference

James Scott Hunter (born November 19, 1947) is an American former professional football player who was a quarterback in the National Football League (NFL) for eight seasons in the 1970s. He played college football for the Alabama Crimson Tide before playing in the NFL for the Green Bay Packers, Buffalo Bills, Atlanta Falcons, and Detroit Lions.

== Early life ==
Born in Mobile, Alabama, Hunter graduated from Vigor High School in Prichard. After his senior season, Hunter was named AAAA All-Alabama by the Associated Press. He committed to Alabama on December 4, 1965.

== College career ==
As NCAA rules prohibited freshmen from playing on varsity football teams at the time, Hunter played on the freshman-only Crimson Tide in 1966. He took a redshirt season in 1967, but became the starter in 1968. In 1969, Alabama hosted the Ole Miss Rebels in a nationally televised game on October 4 in prime time for ABC. In a race of offenses, Hunter outgunned Rebel quarterback Archie Manning in a 33–32 win. At the end of his senior year in 1970, Hunter caught a go-ahead touchdown in the 1970 Astro-Bluebonnet Bowl en route to a tie with Oklahoma.

== Professional career ==
=== Green Bay Packers ===
Hunter was selected in the sixth round of the 1971 NFL draft by the Green Bay Packers, the 140th overall pick. He started ten games when starting quarterback Bart Starr was injured.

Hunter started the entire 1972 season and led the Packers to their first division title and playoff appearance since 1967 under the tutelage of Starr, who served that season as quarterbacks coach. Hunter threw for 1,252 yards with six touchdowns to nine interceptions with a 55.5 passer rating. In the playoff game versus the Washington Redskins, he went 12-of-24 for 150 yards with an interception and two sacks in the 16–3 loss. In 1973, Hunter played only a fraction of the time, embroiled in a quarterback competition with Jerry Tagge and Jim Del Gaizo.

=== Buffalo Bills ===
After signing a multi-year deal with the Packers in May 1974, Hunter was traded in July to the Buffalo Bills after participating in the 1974 NFL strike. The Bills sent Pete Van Valkenberg and Steve Okoniewski to the Packers in the trade. Playing as backup to Joe Ferguson, Hunter made only one appearance all year, helping the team to a win against the Atlanta Falcons on October 16. He was waived during the 1975 training camp and did not play in the NFL that season, instead running unsuccessfully for local government in Mobile.

=== Atlanta Falcons ===
Hunter landed with the Atlanta Falcons in 1976, starting the season on the bench and gaining playing time as the season went on. Hunter started seven games in 1977, until starter Steve Bartkowski returned from knee surgery and took over as the full-time starter. Hunter was active for the Falcons but did not play a down in 1978 . Was released during training camp in 1979

=== Detroit Lions ===
Hunter's last season in the NFL was 1979 with the Detroit Lions, where he backed up Jeff Komlo but still saw some action when the rookie struggled and occasionally challenged for the starting job.

== After football ==
Hunter returned to Alabama and worked as a sportscaster in Mobile for nearly two decades. He worked for WKRG-TV, the CBS affiliate, and then for WPMI-TV, the NBC affiliate. He then worked as an investment broker.

He also co-hosts a seasonal radio show on WNSP 105.5 FM called "Talkin' Football" (pronounced Tawlkin-Football) with former Auburn offensive lineman, Tracy Turner. Scott remains great friends with Archie Manning to this day and the two have intercontinental text conversations when Archie is in Europe. Hunter is known for "dropping it in the bucket" and being one of five Alabama quarterbacks (Blake Sims, Tua Tagovailoa, Mac Jones, and Bryce Young) to throw for 400 yards in a game. Hunter is famous for "Keeping It Between the Lines" and not allowing coaching hot seat talk or "who danced with who on Saturday night" to derail conversations.

Prior to its closure, "Talkin' Football" was frequently hosted from John Word's Captain's Table, which was in the shadow of the USS Alabama. Hunter would often say that their steaks were "so big that they hang off your plate".

Hunter is a commercial pilot with over 4,000 flying hours. He flies a Cessna 182.

Hunter was inducted in the Alabama Sports Hall of Fame in 1998. He is married with three children, and resided in Daphne, Alabama in the late 2000s. He had previously lived in De Pere, Wisconsin when he played with the Packers.

== See also ==
- Alabama Crimson Tide football yearly statistical leaders
