= 1970 Vanderbilt Commodores football team =

American college football season

1970 Vanderbilt Commodores football
- Conference: Southeastern Conference
- Record: 4–7 (1–5 SEC)
- Head coach: Bill Pace (4th season)
- Home stadium: Dudley Field

1970 Southeastern Conference football standings
	Conf.					Overall
Team	W		L		T	W		L		T
No. 7 LSU $	5	–	0	–	0	9	–	3	–	0
No. 4 Tennessee	4	–	1	–	0	11	–	1	–	0
No. 10 Auburn	5	–	2	–	0	9	–	2	–	0
No. 20 Ole Miss	4	–	2	–	0	7	–	4	–	0
Florida	3	–	3	–	0	7	–	4	–	0
Georgia	3	–	3	–	0	5	–	5	–	0
Alabama	3	–	4	–	0	6	–	5	–	1
Mississippi State	3	–	4	–	0	6	–	5	–	0
Vanderbilt	1	–	5	–	0	4	–	7	–	0
Kentucky	0	–	7	–	0	2	–	9	–	0
$ – Conference champion; Rankings from AP Poll

The 1970 Vanderbilt Commodores football team represented Vanderbilt University in the 1970 NCAA University Division football season. The Commodores were led by head coach Bill Pace in his fourth season and finished the season with a record of four wins and seven losses (4–7 overall, 1–5 in the SEC).

== Schedule ==
Date	Opponent	Site	Result	Attendance	Source
September 12	Chattanooga*	Dudley Field; Nashville, TN	W 39–6	20,862	
September 19	The Citadel*	Dudley Field; Nashville, TN	W 52–0	17,333	
September 26	vs. Mississippi State	Memphis Memorial Stadium; Memphis, TN	L 6–20	16,615	
October 3	No. 19 North Carolina*	Dudley Field; Nashville, TN	L 7–10	20,400	
October 10	at Alabama	Denny Stadium; Tuscaloosa, AL	L 11–35	49,038	
October 17	at Georgia	Sanford Stadium; Athens, GA (rivalry)	L 3–37	53,241	
October 24	No. 13 Ole Miss	Dudley Field; Nashville, TN (rivalry)	L 16–26	34,000	
October 31	Tulane*	Dudley Field; Nashville, TN	L 7–10	19,000	
November 7	at Kentucky	McLean Stadium; Lexington, KY (rivalry)	W 18–17	30,000	
November 21	at No. 4 (small) Tampa*	Tampa Stadium; Tampa, FL	W 36–28	35,897	
November 28	No. 7 Tennessee	Dudley Field; Nashville, TN (rivalry)	L 6–24	33,850	
*Non-conference game; Rankings from AP Poll released prior to the game
