= 1970 NCAA University Division football season =

American college football season

- Preseason AP No. 1: Texas
- Number of bowls: 11
- Bowl games: December 12, 1970 – January 2, 1971
- Champion(s): Nebraska (AP, FWAA); Texas (Coaches, NFF); Ohio State (NFF)
- Heisman: Stanford quarterback Jim Plunkett

The 1970 NCAA University Division football season was marked by tragedy, due to two airplane crashes. On October 2, one of the planes carrying the Wichita State football team crashed on the way to a game against Utah State, killing 31 people on board, including 14 players. Then, on November 14, the charter for the Marshall Thundering Herd crashed on the way home from a game against East Carolina, killing all 75 persons.

At season's end, the Nebraska Cornhuskers won the AP national championship after Texas and Ohio State both lost their bowl games on New Year's Day.

No new teams were reclassified in the University Division for the 1970 season. A total of 119 teams competed in the University Division during the 1970 season.

This was the first season the NCAA allowed schools to schedule 11 regular season games. Some took advantage by scheduling high-profile intersectional games (Stanford-Arkansas, USC-Alabama, LSU-Notre Dame), but others, including the entire Big Ten Conference, waited until future years to add an 11th game (Big Ten champion Ohio State played only nine regular season games).

During the 20th century, the NCAA had no playoff for the major college football teams, later known as "Division I-A." The NCAA Football Guide, however, did note an "unofficial national champion" based on the top ranked teams in the "wire service" (AP and UPI) polls. The "writers' poll" by Associated Press (AP) was the most popular, followed by the "coaches' poll" by United Press International (UPI).

Until 1974, the UPI issued its final poll before the bowls, but beginning in 1968 (also 1965), the AP Trophy was withheld until the postseason was completed. The AP poll in 1970 consisted of the votes of as many as 52 sportswriters, though not all of them voted in every poll. Those who cast votes would give their opinion of the ten best teams. Under a point system of 20 points for first place, 19 for second, etc., the "overall" ranking was determined.

== Rule changes ==
- Teams are allowed to schedule 11 regular season games, up from 10.
- Defensive pass interference is penalized from the spot of the foul, regardless if the pass was thrown or not. Previously, interference before the pass was thrown was a 15-yard penalty from the previous spot. This change would be repealed in the 1984 season.
- Also, defenders were not allowed to touch pass receivers if the receiver had caught up to them in their pattern or if it was obvious they were attempting to catch a pass.
- Cleat length is reduced from 3/4 inches to 1/2 inch.

== Conference and program changes ==
| School | 1969 Conference | 1970 Conference |
|---|---|---|
| Boise State Broncos | NAIA Independent | Big Sky |
| Cal State Fullerton Titans | Program Established | CCAA |
| Cincinnati Bearcats | Missouri Valley | Independent |
| Northern Arizona Lumberjacks | Independent | Big Sky |

== September ==
In the preseason poll released on September 7, Ohio State was placed No. 1 with 19 1st place votes. Texas and USC followed, with 7 and 6 votes, and Arkansas and Mississippi each received a single first-place vote.

September 12: No. 3 USC beat No. 16 Alabama 42–21 at Birmingham; the integrated Trojans' lopsided victory over the all-white Crimson Tide has often been described as a symbolic moment in the desegregation of college football in the South. In another showdown between southern and Californian teams, No. 4 Arkansas lost to No. 10 Stanford 34–28 at Little Rock. The next poll featured No. 1 Ohio State, No. 2 Texas, No. 3 USC, No. 4 Stanford, and No. 5 Mississippi.

September 19: No. 2 Texas won in Austin against California 56–15. In Los Angeles, No. 3 USC tied No. 9 Nebraska 21–21. No. 4 Stanford beat San Jose State 34–3. No. 5 Mississippi opened with a 47–13 win at Memphis State. No. 7 Penn State, which had beaten Navy 55–7, reached the Top Five. The next poll featured No. 1 Ohio State, No. 2 Texas, No. 3 Stanford, No. 4 Penn State, and No. 5 Mississippi.

September 26: No. 1 Ohio State opened its season at home in Columbus, beating Texas A&M 56–13. No. 2 Texas won in Lubbock over Texas Tech, 35–13. No. 3 Stanford won at Oregon 33–10 in a battle between Jim Plunkett and Dan Fouts. No. 4 Penn State lost at No. 18 Colorado 41–13. No. 5 Mississippi escaped a loss to Kentucky in Jackson, 20–17. No. 6 Notre Dame, which had beaten Purdue 48–0, moved up in the poll. No. 7 USC returned to the top five with a 48–0 win at Iowa. The next poll featured No. 1 Ohio State, No. 2 Texas, No. 3 Stanford, No. 4 Notre Dame, and No. 5 USC.

== October ==
October 3: No. 1 Ohio State beat Duke at home 34–10. No. 2 Texas squeaked by No. 13 UCLA at home 20–17 on a touchdown with 12 seconds to play. No. 3 Stanford lost to Purdue 26–14. No. 4 Notre Dame beat Michigan State in East Lansing, 29–0. No. 5 USC beat visiting Oregon State 45–13. No. 7 Mississippi earned a 48–23 win in Jackson over No. 17 Alabama. The next poll featured No. 1 Ohio State, No. 2 Texas, No. 3 Notre Dame, No. 4 USC, and No. 5 Mississippi.

October 10: No. 1 Ohio State beat Michigan State in East Lansing, 29–0. No. 2 Texas defeated Oklahoma in Dallas, 41–9. No. 3 Notre Dame beat Army at home, 51–10. No. 4 USC lost at No. 12 Stanford 24–14. No. 5 Mississippi won at Georgia 31–21. No. 6 Nebraska, which had tied USC earlier, rose in the poll after its 21–7 win over No. 16 Missouri gave it a 4–0–1 record. The next poll featured No. 1 Ohio State, No. 2 Texas, No. 3 Notre Dame, No. 4 Mississippi, and No. 5 Nebraska.

October 17: No. 1 Ohio State beat Minnesota at home, 28–8. No. 2 Texas was idle. No. 3 Notre Dame won at No. 18 Missouri, 24–7. No. 4 Mississippi lost at home in Oxford to Southern Mississippi, 30–14. No. 5 Nebraska won at Kansas 41–20. No. 6 Michigan, which had beaten Michigan State 34–20 at home to reach 5–0, got into the top five. The next poll featured No. 1 Ohio State, No. 2 Texas, No. 3 Notre Dame, No. 4 Nebraska, and No. 5 Michigan.

October 24: No. 1 Ohio State won at Illinois 48–29. No. 2 Texas defeated Rice 45–21 in Houston. No. 3 Notre Dame was idle. No. 4 Nebraska beat Oklahoma State 65–31. No. 5 Michigan beat Minnesota 39–13 at home. In the next poll, Ohio State and Texas switched spots in a very close vote, with the Longhorns rising to No. 1 and the Buckeyes moving down to No. 2. The other three teams in the top five remained the same.

October 31: No. 1 Texas beat SMU at home 42–15. No. 2 Ohio State beat No. 20 Northwestern 24–10. No. 3 Notre Dame defeated Navy 56–7 in Philadelphia. No. 4 Nebraska won at Colorado 29–13. No. 5 Michigan won at Wisconsin 29–15. Despite reaching 6–0, Ohio State continued to drop in the next poll: No. 1 Texas, No. 2 Notre Dame, No. 3 Ohio State, No. 4 Nebraska, and No. 5 Michigan.

== November ==
November 7: No. 1 Texas won at Baylor 21–14. No. 2 Notre Dame beat Pittsburgh 46–14 at home. No. 3 Ohio State won at Wisconsin 24–7. No. 4 Nebraska won at Iowa State 54–29. No. 5 Michigan beat visiting Illinois 42–0. After Texas' single-touchdown victory and Notre Dame's blowout, the next poll featured another switch between the top two teams: No. 1 Notre Dame, No. 2 Texas, No. 3 Ohio State, No. 4 Nebraska, and No. 5 Michigan.

November 14: No. 1 Notre Dame survived visiting Georgia Tech, 10–7 and No. 2 Texas won at Texas Christian 58–0, triggering a reversal of last week's switch at the top of the poll. No. 3 Ohio State eked out a win at Purdue 10–7. No. 4 Nebraska beat visiting No. 20 Kansas State 51–13 to clinch the Big 8 title and a spot in the Orange Bowl, and No. 5 Michigan shut out Iowa 55–0. The next poll featured No. 1 Texas, No. 2 Notre Dame, No. 3 Nebraska, No. 4 Michigan, and No. 5 Ohio State.

November 21: As No. 1 Texas prepared for a Thanksgiving Day game, No. 2 Notre Dame won, but just barely, beating visiting No. 7 LSU 3–0. No. 3 Nebraska beat Oklahoma 28–21 at home to finish its season unbeaten. Despite a first-place preseason ranking and an undefeated record, Ohio State had fallen all the way to No. 5, one spot behind their nemesis Michigan. In the second installment of "The Ten Year War," the rivals squared off in Columbus with the Big Ten championship and a spot in the Rose Bowl on the line. In the end, Ohio State justified their early ranking with a 20–9 win and prepared to face Pac-8 champion Stanford in Pasadena. Meanwhile, No. 6 Arkansas won at No. 19 Texas Tech 24–10. The next poll featured No. 1 Texas, No. 2 Ohio State, No. 3 Nebraska, No. 4 Notre Dame, and No. 5 Arkansas.

November 26–28: On Thanksgiving Day, No. 1 Texas beat Texas A&M at home 52–14 to reach 9–0. Two days later, No. 4 Notre Dame lost to USC in Los Angeles, 38–28, despite over 500 passing yards by quarterback Joe Theismann in a torrential downpour. No. 3 Nebraska completed its regular season the previous week, and No. 5 Arkansas was idle. No. 7 Tennessee which had beaten Vanderbilt 24–6 in Nashville, moved up in the next poll: No. 1 Texas, No. 2 Ohio State, No. 3 Nebraska, No. 4 Arkansas, and No. 5 Tennessee.

== December ==
December 5: No. 1 Texas and No. 4 Arkansas matched up in Austin for the same stakes as the previous year: a SWC title, a Cotton Bowl berth, and the opportunity to stay in national championship contention. The Longhorns had prevailed by a single point in the 1969 game, but in 1970 they would be far more dominant, winning 42–7. With this victory, Texas closed a perfect season at 10–0, ran its winning streak to 30, and clinched the UPI national championship; their last obstacle to the AP title would be No. 6 Notre Dame in the Cotton Bowl. No. 2 Ohio State and No. 3 Nebraska had finished their seasons. No. 5 Tennessee defeated UCLA 28−17 and prepared to play Air Force in the Sugar Bowl. No. 8 LSU crushed No. 16 Ole Miss 61–17 at Baton Rouge to clinch the Southeastern Conference championship and earn a berth in the Orange Bowl against Nebraska. The final regular-season poll was No. 1 Texas, No. 2 Ohio State, No. 3 Nebraska, No. 4 Tennessee, and No. 5 LSU.

== Conference standings ==
1970 Atlantic Coast Conference football standings
| | Conf. | | | | | Overall |
| Team | W | | L | | T | W | | L | | T |
|---|---|---|---|---|---|---|---|---|---|---|
| Wake Forest $ | 5 | – | 1 | – | 0 | 6 | – | 5 | – | 0 |
| North Carolina | 5 | – | 2 | – | 0 | 8 | – | 4 | – | 0 |
| Duke | 5 | – | 2 | – | 0 | 6 | – | 5 | – | 0 |
| South Carolina | 3 | – | 2 | – | 1 | 4 | – | 6 | – | 1 |
| NC State | 2 | – | 3 | – | 1 | 3 | – | 7 | – | 1 |
| Clemson | 2 | – | 4 | – | 0 | 3 | – | 8 | – | 0 |
| Maryland | 2 | – | 4 | – | 0 | 2 | – | 9 | – | 0 |
| Virginia | 0 | – | 6 | – | 0 | 5 | – | 6 | – | 0 |
$ – Conference champion; Rankings from AP Poll

1970 Big Eight Conference football standings
| | Conf. | | | | | Overall |
| Team | W | | L | | T | W | | L | | T |
|---|---|---|---|---|---|---|---|---|---|---|
| No. 1 Nebraska $ | 7 | – | 0 | – | 0 | 11 | – | 0 | – | 1 |
| No. 20 Oklahoma | 5 | – | 2 | – | 0 | 7 | – | 4 | – | 1 |
| Kansas State | 5 | – | 2 | – | 0 | 6 | – | 5 | – | 0 |
| Missouri | 3 | – | 4 | – | 0 | 5 | – | 6 | – | 0 |
| Colorado | 3 | – | 4 | – | 0 | 6 | – | 5 | – | 0 |
| Kansas | 2 | – | 5 | – | 0 | 5 | – | 6 | – | 0 |
| Oklahoma State | 2 | – | 5 | – | 0 | 4 | – | 7 | – | 0 |
| Iowa State | 1 | – | 6 | – | 0 | 5 | – | 6 | – | 0 |
$ – Conference champion; Rankings from AP Poll

1970 Big Sky Conference football standings
| | Conf. | | | | | Overall |
| Team | W | | L | | T | W | | L | | T |
|---|---|---|---|---|---|---|---|---|---|---|
| Montana $ | 5 | – | 0 | – | 0 | 10 | – | 1 | – | 0 |
| Idaho State | 3 | – | 2 | – | 0 | 5 | – | 5 | – | 0 |
| Boise State | 2 | – | 2 | – | 0 | 8 | – | 3 | – | 0 |
| Weber State | 3 | – | 3 | – | 0 | 5 | – | 5 | – | 1 |
| Idaho | 2 | – | 2 | – | 0 | 4 | – | 7 | – | 0 |
| Montana State | 1 | – | 5 | – | 0 | 2 | – | 8 | – | 0 |
| Northern Arizona | 0 | – | 4 | – | 0 | 2 | – | 8 | – | 0 |
$ – Conference champion; Boise State's game against Long Beach State and Northern Arizona's game against New Mexico State counted in the conference standings.

1970 Big Ten Conference football standings
| | Conf. | | | | | Overall |
| Team | W | | L | | T | W | | L | | T |
|---|---|---|---|---|---|---|---|---|---|---|
| No. 5 Ohio State $ | 7 | – | 0 | – | 0 | 9 | – | 1 | – | 0 |
| No. 9 Michigan | 6 | – | 1 | – | 0 | 9 | – | 1 | – | 0 |
| Northwestern | 6 | – | 1 | – | 0 | 6 | – | 4 | – | 0 |
| Iowa | 3 | – | 3 | – | 1 | 3 | – | 6 | – | 1 |
| Wisconsin | 3 | – | 4 | – | 0 | 4 | – | 5 | – | 1 |
| Michigan State | 3 | – | 4 | – | 0 | 4 | – | 6 | – | 0 |
| Minnesota | 2 | – | 4 | – | 1 | 3 | – | 6 | – | 1 |
| Purdue | 2 | – | 5 | – | 0 | 4 | – | 6 | – | 0 |
| Illinois | 1 | – | 6 | – | 0 | 3 | – | 7 | – | 0 |
| Indiana | 1 | – | 6 | – | 0 | 1 | – | 9 | – | 0 |
$ – Conference champion; Rankings from AP Poll

1970 Ivy League football standings
| | Conf. | | | | | Overall |
| Team | W | | L | | T | W | | L | | T |
|---|---|---|---|---|---|---|---|---|---|---|
| No. 14 Dartmouth $ | 7 | – | 0 | – | 0 | 9 | – | 0 | – | 0 |
| Yale | 5 | – | 2 | – | 0 | 7 | – | 2 | – | 0 |
| Harvard | 5 | – | 2 | – | 0 | 7 | – | 2 | – | 0 |
| Cornell | 4 | – | 3 | – | 0 | 6 | – | 3 | – | 0 |
| Princeton | 3 | – | 4 | – | 0 | 5 | – | 4 | – | 0 |
| Penn | 2 | – | 5 | – | 0 | 4 | – | 5 | – | 0 |
| Columbia | 1 | – | 6 | – | 0 | 3 | – | 6 | – | 0 |
| Brown | 1 | – | 6 | – | 0 | 2 | – | 7 | – | 0 |
$ – Conference champion; Rankings from AP Poll

1970 Mid-American Conference football standings
| | Conf. | | | | | Overall |
| Team | W | | L | | T | W | | L | | T |
|---|---|---|---|---|---|---|---|---|---|---|
| No. 12 Toledo $ | 5 | – | 0 | – | 0 | 12 | – | 0 | – | 0 |
| Miami (OH) | 3 | – | 2 | – | 0 | 7 | – | 3 | – | 0 |
| Ohio | 3 | – | 2 | – | 0 | 4 | – | 5 | – | 0 |
| Western Michigan | 2 | – | 3 | – | 0 | 7 | – | 3 | – | 0 |
| Kent State | 1 | – | 4 | – | 0 | 3 | – | 7 | – | 0 |
| Bowling Green | 1 | – | 4 | – | 0 | 2 | – | 6 | – | 1 |
$ – Conference champion; Rankings from AP Poll

1970 Missouri Valley Conference football standings
| | Conf. | | | | | Overall |
| Team | W | | L | | T | W | | L | | T |
|---|---|---|---|---|---|---|---|---|---|---|
| Louisville $ | 4 | – | 0 | – | 0 | 8 | – | 3 | – | 1 |
| Tulsa | 3 | – | 1 | – | 0 | 6 | – | 4 | – | 0 |
| Memphis State | 2 | – | 2 | – | 0 | 6 | – | 4 | – | 0 |
| North Texas State | 1 | – | 3 | – | 0 | 3 | – | 8 | – | 0 |
| Wichita State | 0 | – | 4 | – | 0 | 0 | – | 9 | – | 0 |
$ – Conference champion

1970 Pacific Coast Athletic Association football standings
| | Conf. | | | | | Overall |
| Team | W | | L | | T | W | | L | | T |
|---|---|---|---|---|---|---|---|---|---|---|
| San Diego State + | 5 | – | 1 | – | 0 | 9 | – | 2 | – | 0 |
| Long Beach State + | 5 | – | 1 | – | 0 | 9 | – | 2 | – | 1 |
| Fresno State | 4 | – | 2 | – | 0 | 8 | – | 4 | – | 0 |
| Pacific (CA) | 2 | – | 3 | – | 0 | 5 | – | 6 | – | 0 |
| San Jose State | 2 | – | 3 | – | 0 | 2 | – | 9 | – | 0 |
| UC Santa Barbara | 1 | – | 5 | – | 0 | 2 | – | 9 | – | 0 |
| Cal State Los Angeles | 0 | – | 4 | – | 0 | 1 | – | 9 | – | 0 |
+ – Conference co-champions

1970 Pacific-8 Conference football standings
| | Conf. | | | | | Overall |
| Team | W | | L | | T | W | | L | | T |
|---|---|---|---|---|---|---|---|---|---|---|
| No. 8 Stanford $ | 6 | – | 1 | – | 0 | 9 | – | 3 | – | 0 |
| Washington | 4 | – | 3 | – | 0 | 6 | – | 4 | – | 0 |
| Oregon | 4 | – | 3 | – | 0 | 6 | – | 4 | – | 1 |
| UCLA | 4 | – | 3 | – | 0 | 6 | – | 5 | – | 0 |
| California | 4 | – | 3 | – | 0 | 6 | – | 5 | – | 0 |
| No. 15 USC | 3 | – | 4 | – | 0 | 6 | – | 4 | – | 1 |
| Oregon State | 3 | – | 4 | – | 0 | 6 | – | 5 | – | 0 |
| Washington State | 0 | – | 7 | – | 0 | 1 | – | 10 | – | 0 |
$ – Conference champion; Rankings from AP Poll

1970 Southern Conference football standings
| | Conf. | | | | | Overall |
| Team | W | | L | | T | W | | L | | T |
|---|---|---|---|---|---|---|---|---|---|---|
| William & Mary $ | 3 | – | 1 | – | 0 | 5 | – | 7 | – | 0 |
| The Citadel | 4 | – | 2 | – | 0 | 5 | – | 6 | – | 0 |
| Furman | 3 | – | 2 | – | 0 | 8 | – | 3 | – | 0 |
| East Carolina | 2 | – | 2 | – | 0 | 3 | – | 8 | – | 0 |
| Richmond | 3 | – | 3 | – | 0 | 4 | – | 6 | – | 0 |
| Davidson | 2 | – | 4 | – | 0 | 2 | – | 8 | – | 0 |
| VMI | 1 | – | 4 | – | 0 | 1 | – | 10 | – | 0 |
$ – Conference champion

1970 Southeastern Conference football standings
| | Conf. | | | | | Overall |
| Team | W | | L | | T | W | | L | | T |
|---|---|---|---|---|---|---|---|---|---|---|
| No. 7 LSU $ | 5 | – | 0 | – | 0 | 9 | – | 3 | – | 0 |
| No. 4 Tennessee | 4 | – | 1 | – | 0 | 11 | – | 1 | – | 0 |
| No. 10 Auburn | 5 | – | 2 | – | 0 | 9 | – | 2 | – | 0 |
| No. 20 Ole Miss | 4 | – | 2 | – | 0 | 7 | – | 4 | – | 0 |
| Florida | 3 | – | 3 | – | 0 | 7 | – | 4 | – | 0 |
| Georgia | 3 | – | 3 | – | 0 | 5 | – | 5 | – | 0 |
| Alabama | 3 | – | 4 | – | 0 | 6 | – | 5 | – | 1 |
| Mississippi State | 3 | – | 4 | – | 0 | 6 | – | 5 | – | 0 |
| Vanderbilt | 1 | – | 5 | – | 0 | 4 | – | 7 | – | 0 |
| Kentucky | 0 | – | 7 | – | 0 | 2 | – | 9 | – | 0 |
$ – Conference champion; Rankings from AP Poll

1970 Southwest Conference football standings
| | Conf. | | | | | Overall |
| Team | W | | L | | T | W | | L | | T |
|---|---|---|---|---|---|---|---|---|---|---|
| No. 3 Texas $ | 7 | – | 0 | – | 0 | 10 | – | 1 | – | 0 |
| No. 11 Arkansas | 6 | – | 1 | – | 0 | 9 | – | 2 | – | 0 |
| Texas Tech | 5 | – | 2 | – | 0 | 8 | – | 4 | – | 0 |
| Rice | 3 | – | 4 | – | 0 | 5 | – | 5 | – | 0 |
| SMU | 3 | – | 4 | – | 0 | 5 | – | 6 | – | 0 |
| TCU | 3 | – | 4 | – | 0 | 4 | – | 6 | – | 1 |
| Baylor | 1 | – | 6 | – | 0 | 2 | – | 9 | – | 0 |
| Texas A&M | 0 | – | 7 | – | 0 | 2 | – | 9 | – | 0 |
$ – Conference champion; Rankings from AP Poll

1970 Western Athletic Conference football standings
| | Conf. | | | | | Overall |
| Team | W | | L | | T | W | | L | | T |
|---|---|---|---|---|---|---|---|---|---|---|
| No. 6 Arizona State $ | 7 | – | 0 | – | 0 | 11 | – | 0 | – | 0 |
| New Mexico | 5 | – | 1 | – | 0 | 7 | – | 3 | – | 0 |
| Utah | 4 | – | 2 | – | 0 | 6 | – | 4 | – | 0 |
| UTEP | 4 | – | 3 | – | 0 | 6 | – | 4 | – | 0 |
| Arizona | 2 | – | 4 | – | 0 | 4 | – | 6 | – | 0 |
| Colorado State | 1 | – | 3 | – | 0 | 4 | – | 7 | – | 0 |
| BYU | 1 | – | 6 | – | 0 | 3 | – | 8 | – | 0 |
| Wyoming | 1 | – | 6 | – | 0 | 1 | – | 9 | – | 0 |
$ – Conference champion; Rankings from AP Poll

1970 NCAA University Division independents football records
| | Conf. | | | Overall |
| Team | W | L | T | W | | L | | T |
|---|---|---|---|---|---|---|---|---|
| No. 2 Notre Dame | | – | | 10 | – | 1 | – | 0 |
| Villanova | | – | | 9 | – | 2 | – | 0 |
| No. 16 Air Force | | – | | 9 | – | 3 | – | 0 |
| No. 13 Georgia Tech | | – | | 9 | – | 3 | – | 0 |
| Boston College | | – | | 8 | – | 2 | – | 0 |
| No. 19 Houston | | – | | 8 | – | 3 | – | 0 |
| West Virginia | | – | | 8 | – | 3 | – | 0 |
| No. 17 Tulane | | – | | 8 | – | 4 | – | 0 |
| No. 18 Penn State | | – | | 7 | – | 3 | – | 0 |
| West Texas State | | – | | 7 | – | 3 | – | 0 |
| Cincinnati | | – | | 7 | – | 4 | – | 0 |
| Florida State | | – | | 7 | – | 4 | – | 0 |
| Virginia Tech | | – | | 5 | – | 6 | – | 0 |
| Syracuse | | – | | 6 | – | 4 | – | 0 |
| Dayton | | – | | 5 | – | 4 | – | 1 |
| Pittsburgh | | – | | 5 | – | 5 | – | 0 |
| Rutgers | | – | | 5 | – | 5 | – | 0 |
| Utah State | | – | | 5 | – | 5 | – | 0 |
| Colgate | | – | | 5 | – | 6 | – | 0 |
| Southern Miss | | – | | 5 | – | 6 | – | 0 |
| New Mexico State | | – | | 4 | – | 6 | – | 0 |
| Miami (FL) | | – | | 3 | – | 8 | – | 0 |
| Northern Illinois | | – | | 3 | – | 7 | – | 0 |
| Marshall | | – | | 3 | – | 6 | – | 0 |
| Buffalo | | – | | 2 | – | 9 | – | 0 |
| Navy | | – | | 2 | – | 9 | – | 0 |
| Army | | – | | 1 | – | 9 | – | 1 |
| Xavier | | – | | 1 | – | 9 | – | 0 |
| Holy Cross | | – | | 0 | – | 10 | – | 1 |
Rankings from AP Poll

== Bowl games ==
=== Major bowls ===
| Bowl | Winner | | Loser | |
|---|---|---|---|---|
| Cotton | No. 6 Notre Dame Fighting Irish | 24 | No. 1 Texas Longhorns | 11 |
| Orange | No. 3 Nebraska Cornhuskers | 17 | No. 5 LSU Tigers | 12 |
| Sugar | No. 4 Tennessee Volunteers | 34 | No. 11 Air Force Falcons | 13 |
| Rose | No. 12 Stanford Indians* | 27 | No. 2 Ohio State Buckeyes | 17 |
*Stanford changed its nickname to the "Cardinals" in 1972 and the singular "Cardinal" in 1981.

In the Cotton Bowl, No. 6 Notre Dame gained revenge for its narrow defeat to No. 1 Texas in the previous year's Cotton Bowl by upsetting the No. 1 Longhorns, 24–11. Notre Dame Head coach Ara Parseghian created a "wishbone defense", positioning his linebackers to mirror the Texas running backs and the Irish held the high-powered Texas running game in check.

In Pasadena, No. 2 Ohio State, the Big Ten champions, were positioned to claim the national championship as they took the field as 10 1/2 point favorites against 8–3 No. 12 Stanford of the Pac-8. The Buckeyes overcame a 10–0 early deficit to take a 14–10 lead on two touchdowns by John Brockington. OSU was still ahead 17–13 after three quarters. But Stanford, led by Heisman Trophy winner Jim Plunkett scored two fourth-quarter touchdown to stun Ohio State 27–17.

With the door open, No. 3 Nebraska of the Big 8 seized the opportunity that night in Miami in the Orange Bowl against stubborn No. 5 LSU of the SEC. Down 12–10 after three quarters, the Huskers scored a fourth-quarter touchdown and shut down the Tigers to prevail 17–12 on the new Poly-Turf and claim the national title. Nebraska took 39 of the 52 first place votes in the final AP Poll, while Notre Dame received eight, Texas three, and Arizona State (11–0) two.

1. Nebraska 946 (39), 11–0–1
2. Notre Dame 814 (8), 10–1
3. Texas 721 (3), 10–1
4. Tennessee 683, 11–1
5. Ohio State 588, 9–1

=== Other bowls ===
| Bowl | Location | Winner | | Loser | |
|---|---|---|---|---|---|
| Sun | El Paso | No. 13 Georgia Tech | 17 | No. 19 Texas Tech | 9 |
| Gator | Jacksonville | No. 10 Auburn | 35 | Ole Miss | 28 |
| Tangerine | Orlando | No. 15 Toledo | 40 | William & Mary | 12 |
| Bluebonnet | Houston | Alabama (tie) | 24 | No. 20 Oklahoma | 24 |
| Liberty | Memphis | Tulane | 17 | Colorado | 3 |
| Peach | Atlanta | No. 8 Arizona State | 48 | North Carolina | 26 |
| Pasadena | Pasadena | Long Beach State | 24 | Louisville (tie) | 24 |

== Awards and honors ==
=== Heisman Trophy voting ===
The Heisman Trophy is given to the year's most outstanding player

| Player | School | Position | 1st | 2nd | 3rd | Total |
|---|---|---|---|---|---|---|
| Jim Plunkett | Stanford | QB | 510 | 285 | 129 | 2,229 |
| Joe Theismann | Notre Dame | QB | 242 | 255 | 174 | 1,410 |
| Archie Manning | Ole Miss | QB | 138 | 133 | 169 | 849 |
| Steve Worster | Texas | RB | 47 | 81 | 95 | 398 |
| Rex Kern | Ohio State | QB | 17 | 39 | 59 | 188 |
| Pat Sullivan | Auburn | QB | 24 | 37 | 34 | 180 |
| Jack Tatum | Ohio State | S | 8 | 48 | 53 | 173 |
| Ernie Jennings | Air Force | WR | 18 | 20 | 24 | 118 |
| Don McCauley | North Carolina | RB | 6 | 10 | 19 | 57 |
| Lynn Dickey | Kansas State | QB | 6 | 6 | 19 | 49 |

=== All-Americans ===
1970 Consensus All-America Team

Offense

| Position | Name | Height | Weight (lbs.) | Class | Hometown | Team |
|---|---|---|---|---|---|---|
| QB | Jim Plunkett | 6'3" | 204 | Sr. | San Jose, California | Stanford |
| HB | Don McCauley | 6'1" | 211 | Sr. | Worcester, Massachusetts | North Carolina |
| FB | Steve Worster | 6'0" | 210 | Sr. | Bridge City, Texas | Texas |
| E | Tom Gatewood | 6'2" | 203 | Jr. | Baltimore, Maryland | Notre Dame |
| E | Elmo Wright | 6'0" | 190 | Sr. | Brazoria, Texas | Houston |
| T | Dan Dierdorf | 6'3" | 275 | Sr. | Canton, Ohio | Michigan |
| T | Bob Newton | 6'4" | 257 | Sr. | Pomona, California | Nebraska |
| G | Larry DiNardo | 6'1" | 235 | Sr. | Howard Beach, Queens, New York | Notre Dame |
| C | Don Popplewell | 6'2" | 240 | Sr. | Raytown, Missouri | Colorado |
| G | Chip Kell | 6'0" | 240 | Sr. | Atlanta, Georgia | Tennessee |
| T | Bobby Wuensch | 6'3" | 230 | Sr. | Houston, Texas | Texas |
| E | Ernie Jennings | 6'0" | 172 | Sr. | Kansas City, Missouri | Air Force |

Defense

| Position | Name | Height | Weight (lbs.) | Class | Hometown | Team |
|---|---|---|---|---|---|---|
| DE | Charlie Weaver | 6'2" | 223 | Sr. | Greenwood, Mississippi | USC |
| DE | Bill Atessis | 6'3" | 240 | Sr. | Houston, Texas | Texas |
| DT | Dick Bumpas | 6'1" | 225 | Sr. | Fort Smith, Arkansas | Arkansas |
| NG | Jim Stillwagon | 6'0" | 239 | Sr. | Mount Vernon, Ohio | Ohio State |
| DT | Rock Perdoni | 5'11" | 278 | Sr. | Wellesley, Massachusetts | Georgia Tech |
| DE | Jack Youngblood | 6'4" | 245 | Sr. | Jacksonville, Florida | Florida |
| LB | Mike Anderson | 6'3" | 225 | Sr. | Baton Rouge, Louisiana | LSU |
| LB | Jack Ham | 6'2" | 225 | Sr. | Johnstown, Pennsylvania | Penn State |
| DB | Jack Tatum | 5'10" | 200 | Sr. | Passaic, New Jersey | Ohio State |
| DB | Tommy Casanova | 6'2" | 195 | Jr. | Crowley, Louisiana | LSU |
| DB | Larry Willingham | 6'0" | 190 | Sr. | Birmingham, Alabama | Auburn |
| DB | Dave Elmendorf | 6'2" | 215 | Sr. | Houston, Texas | Texas A&M |

=== Statistical leaders ===
- Player scoring most points: Don McCauley, North Carolina, 126
