= 1970 Kentucky Wildcats football team =

American college football season

1970 Kentucky Wildcats football
- Conference: Southeastern Conference
- Record: 2–9 (0–7 SEC)
- Head coach: John Ray (2nd season)
- Defensive coordinator: Dennis Fitzgerald (2nd season)
- Home stadium: McLean Stadium

1970 Southeastern Conference football standings
	Conf.					Overall
Team	W		L		T	W		L		T
No. 7 LSU $	5	–	0	–	0	9	–	3	–	0
No. 4 Tennessee	4	–	1	–	0	11	–	1	–	0
No. 10 Auburn	5	–	2	–	0	9	–	2	–	0
No. 20 Ole Miss	4	–	2	–	0	7	–	4	–	0
Florida	3	–	3	–	0	7	–	4	–	0
Georgia	3	–	3	–	0	5	–	5	–	0
Alabama	3	–	4	–	0	6	–	5	–	1
Mississippi State	3	–	4	–	0	6	–	5	–	0
Vanderbilt	1	–	5	–	0	4	–	7	–	0
Kentucky	0	–	7	–	0	2	–	9	–	0
$ – Conference champion; Rankings from AP Poll

The 1970 Kentucky Wildcats football team represented the University of Kentucky as a member of the Southeastern Conference (SEC) during the 1970 NCAA University Division football season. Led by second-year head coach John Ray, the Wildcats compiled an overall record of 2–9, with a mark of 0–7 in conference play, and finished tenth in the SEC.

== Schedule ==
Date	Opponent	Site	Result	Attendance	Source
September 12	at North Carolina*	Kenan Memorial Stadium; Chapel Hill, NC	L 10–20	36,900	
September 19	No. 13 Kansas State*	McLean Stadium; Lexington, KY	W 16–3	33,500	
September 26	at No. 5 Ole Miss	Mississippi Veterans Memorial Stadium; Jackson, MS	L 17–20	46,200	
October 3	No. 12 Auburn	McLean Stadium; Lexington, KY	L 15–33	37,500	
October 10	Utah State*	McLean Stadium; Lexington, KY	L 6–35	33,000	
October 17	at No. 15 LSU	Tiger Stadium; Baton Rouge, LA	L 7–14	67,508	
October 24	Georgia	McLean Stadium; Lexington, KY	L 3–19	34,000	
October 31	NC State*	McLean Stadium; Lexington, KY	W 27–2	27,500	
November 7	Vanderbilt	McLean Stadium; Lexington, KY (rivalry)	L 17–18	30,000	
November 14	vs. Florida	Tampa Stadium; Tampa, FL (rivalry)	L 13–24	45,102	
November 21	at No. 8 Tennessee	Neyland Stadium; Knoxville, TN (rivalry)	L 0–45	63,452	
*Non-conference game; Rankings from AP Poll released prior to the game

== Roster ==
1970 Kentucky Wildcats football team roster
Players
Coaches
Offense

Pos.	#	Name	Class
G	64	Jerry Bentley	Jr
RB	32	Cecil Bowens	So
G	63	Tom Clark	So
RB	24	Lee Clymer	Jr
TE	84	Tom Crowe	Jr
C	54	Pat Eckenrod	Sr
OT	79	Dan Featherston	So
QB	5	Stan Forston	Sr
WR	22	Al Godwin	Sr
WR	86	Jim Grant	Jr
G	78	Fred Hamberg	Sr
OT	67	Dave Hanson	Sr
RB	42	Houston Hogg	Sr
WR	20	Dave Hunter	Sr
RB	30	Gary Knutson	So
RB	17	Paul Martin	Sr
TE	85	Jim Mitchell	Sr
C	75	Dan Neal	Jr
WR	83	Steve Parrish	Jr
OT	72	Dave Pursell	Sr
RB	14	Jim Reed	So
RB	39	Frank Rucks	Sr
QB	8	Bernie Scruggs	Jr
QB	4	Steve Tingle	Jr

Defense

Pos.	#	Name	Class
DT	69	Bill Bushong	Sr
DB	15	Buzz Burnam	So
LB	44	Arvel Carroll	So
DE	76	Mark Doggendorf	Sr
LB	41	Wilbur Hackett	Sr
DE	89	Dave Hardt	Sr
LB	59	Joe Federspiel	Jr
DT	70	Al Fish	Sr
LB	87	Ken King	So
LB	91	Frank Kirschner	Jr
DB	2	Jim Lett	So
LB	62	Rick Muench	Jr
DE	47	Clint Opheikens	Jr
DB	16	John O'Leary	So
DE	92	Don Porterfield	Sr
DT	74	Dave Roller	Sr
DB	18	Joe Stephan	Jr
DB	12	Earl Swindle	So
DB	19	Dave Van Meter	Jr

Special teams

Pos.	#	Name	Class
K	3	Bob Jones	Sr

Head coach

- John Ray

Coordinators/assistant coaches

Legend

- (C) Team captain
- (S) Suspended
- (I) Ineligible
- Injured
- Redshirt
