= 1970 Georgia Bulldogs football team =

American college football season

1970 Georgia Bulldogs football
- Conference: Southeastern Conference
- Record: 5–5 (3–3 SEC)
- Head coach: Vince Dooley (7th season)
- Defensive coordinator: Erk Russell (7th season)
- Home stadium: Sanford Stadium

1970 Southeastern Conference football standings
	Conf.					Overall
Team	W		L		T	W		L		T
No. 7 LSU $	5	–	0	–	0	9	–	3	–	0
No. 4 Tennessee	4	–	1	–	0	11	–	1	–	0
No. 10 Auburn	5	–	2	–	0	9	–	2	–	0
No. 20 Ole Miss	4	–	2	–	0	7	–	4	–	0
Florida	3	–	3	–	0	7	–	4	–	0
Georgia	3	–	3	–	0	5	–	5	–	0
Alabama	3	–	4	–	0	6	–	5	–	1
Mississippi State	3	–	4	–	0	6	–	5	–	0
Vanderbilt	1	–	5	–	0	4	–	7	–	0
Kentucky	0	–	7	–	0	2	–	9	–	0
$ – Conference champion; Rankings from AP Poll

The 1970 Georgia Bulldogs football team represented the University of Georgia as a member of the Southeastern Conference (SEC) during the 1970 NCAA University Division football season. Led by seventh-year head coach Vince Dooley, the Bulldogs compiled an overall record of 5–5, with a mark of 3–3 in conference play, and finished sixth in the SEC.

This was the first season the NCAA permitted University Division teams to schedule 11 games, but Georgia was one of three SEC members which did not, along with Auburn and Ole Miss.

== Schedule ==
Date	Opponent	Rank	Site	TV	Result	Attendance	Source
September 19	at Tulane*	No. 19	Tulane Stadium; New Orleans, LA		L 14–17	30,924	
September 26	Clemson*		Sanford Stadium; Athens, GA (rivalry)		W 38–0	55,682	
October 3	at Mississippi State		Mississippi Veterans Memorial Stadium; Jackson, MS		L 6–7	25,044	
October 10	No. 5 Ole Miss		Sanford Stadium; Athens, GA		L 21–31	59,310	
October 17	Vanderbilt		Sanford Stadium; Athens, GA (rivalry)		W 37–3	53,241	
October 24	at Kentucky		Stoll Field/McLean Stadium; Lexington, KY		W 19–3	34,000	
October 31	South Carolina*^{†}		Sanford Stadium; Athens, GA (rivalry)	ABC	W 52–34	57,391	
November 7	vs. Florida		Gator Bowl Stadium; Jacksonville, FL (rivalry)	ABC	L 17–24	70,294	
November 14	at No. 8 Auburn		Cliff Hare Stadium; Auburn, AL (rivalry)	ABC	W 31–17	61,791	
November 28	No. 16 Georgia Tech*		Sanford Stadium; Athens, GA (rivalry)		L 7–17	59,803	
*Non-conference game; ^{†}Homecoming; Rankings from AP Poll released prior to the game

== Game summaries ==
=== Auburn ===
Team	1	2	3	4	Total
• Georgia	6	8	3	14	31
Auburn	0	17	0	0	17

- Date: November 14
- Location: Cliff Hare Stadium, Auburn, AL
- Game attendance: 61,791
- Television network: ABC

Scoring summary
1		UGA	Whittemore 16-yard pass from Gilbert (kick failed)	UGA 6-0
2		AUB	Sullivan 1-yard run (Jett kick)	AUB 7-6
2		UGA	Lake 1-yard run (Gilbert to Whittemore pass)	UGA 14-7
2		AUB	Jett 31-yard field goal	UGA 14-10
2		AUB	Zofko 1-yard run (Jett kick)	AUB 17-14
3		UGA	Braswell 26-yard field goal	Tied 17-17
4	12:07	UGA	Lake 4-yard run (Braswell kick)	UGA 24-17
4		UGA	Montgomery 1-yard run (Braswell kick)	UGA 31-17

== Roster ==
1970 Georgia Bulldogs football team roster
Players
Coaches
Offense

Pos.	#	Name	Class
RB		Donnie Allen
TE		Billy Brice
RB		Gregg Byrd
RB		Johnny Campbell
QB	12	Mike Cavan	Sr
QB		Paul Gilbert
TE		Mike Greene
RB		Bob Honeycutt
WR		Lynn Hunnicutt
OL		John Jennings
RB		Ricky Lake
OL		Mike Lopatka
OL		Tommy Lyons
WR		Larry McKnight
RB		Jack Montgomery
OL		Tom Nash
WR		Rex Putnal
QB		James Ray
TE		Mixon Robinson
WR		Jimmy Shirer
RB		Julian Smiley
OL		Royce Smith
OL		Mayo Tucker
WR		Charles Whittemore

Defense

Pos.	#	Name	Class
DL		Larry Brasher
DB		Bill Darby
LB		Steve Kitchens
DL		Ronny Rogers
DB		Buz Rosenberg
DL		David Saye
DL		Ken Shaw
DL		Phil Sullivan
DB		Buck Swindle
DL		Dennis Watson
LB		Chip Wisdom
DL		Jimmy Wood

Special teams

Pos.	#	Name	Class
P		Sam Burns

Head coach

- Vince Dooley

Coordinators/assistant coaches

- Erk Russell

Legend

- (C) Team captain
- (S) Suspended
- (I) Ineligible
- Injured
- Redshirt
