= 1971 Orange Bowl =

American college football game

- 37th Orange Bowl
- The Miami Orange Bowl in Miami, Florida, hosted the Orange Bowl.
LSU Tigers	Nebraska Cornhuskers
(9–2)	(10–0–1)
SEC	Big Eight
12	17
Head coach: Charles McClendon	Head coach: Bob Devaney
AP / Coaches; 5 / 6	AP / Coaches; 3 / 3
	1	2	3	4	Total
LSU	0	3	9	0	12
Nebraska	10	0	0	7	17
- Date: January 1, 1971
- Season: 1970
- Stadium: Orange Bowl
- Location: Miami, Florida
- MVP: Jerry Tagge (Nebraska QB); Willie Harper (Nebraska DE)
- Favorite: Nebraska by 7 points
- Referee: Vance Carlson (Big Eight) (split crew: Big Eight, SEC)
- Attendance: 80,699

United States TV coverage
- Network: NBC
- Announcers: Jim Simpson, Al DeRogatis
- Nielsen ratings: 24.5

The 1971 Orange Bowl was the 37th edition of the college football bowl game, played at the Orange Bowl in Miami, Florida, on Friday, January 1. Part of the 1970–71 bowl season, it matched the third-ranked Nebraska Cornhuskers, champions of the Big Eight Conference, and the #5 LSU Tigers, champions of the Southeastern Conference (SEC).

Earlier on New Year's Day, the two top-ranked teams lost their bowl games: #1 Texas in the Cotton and #2 Ohio State in the Rose. The Huskers were aware when they took the field that night that they could claim the top ranking in the AP writers poll with a victory. An LSU victory would likely have given Notre Dame the national title.

Ahead early, Nebraska rallied in the fourth quarter to win 17–12, capturing their first-ever National Championship.

== Game summary ==
Paul Rogers kicked a 25-yard field goal for Nebraska to take an early lead. Joe Orduna scored on a three-yard touchdown run, as Nebraska extended its lead to 10–0. Late in the second quarter, LSU got a 36-yard field goal from Mark Lumpkin to cut the lead to 10–3 at halftime.

In the third quarter, Lumpkin added a 25-yard field goal to make it 10–6. On the final play of the third quarter, Buddy Lee threw a 31-yard touchdown pass to Al Coffee to put LSU ahead 12–10. The Huskers then drove 67 yards and quarterback Jerry Tagge scored from a yard out with 8:50 remaining; it was the game's last scoring play and gave Nebraska the 17–12 win.

=== Scoring ===
First quarter

- Nebraska – Paul Rogers 26-yard field goal, 2:40
- Nebraska – Joe Orduna 3-yard run (Rogers kick), 2:06

Second quarter

- LSU – Mark Lumpkin 36-yard field goal, 0:49

Third quarter

- LSU – Lumpkin 25-yard field goal, 11:49
- LSU – Al Coffee 31-yard pass from Buddy Lee (kick failed), 0:00

Fourth quarter

- Nebraska – Jerry Tagge 1-yard run (Rogers kick), 8:50

== Statistics ==
Statistics	LSU	Nebraska
First downs	20	18
Rushes–yards	45–51	48–132
Passing yards	227	161
Passes (C–A–I)	17–32–1	14–28–2
Total offense	77–278	76–293
Return yards	3	3
Fumbles–lost	4–3	4–3
Turnovers	4	5
Punts–average	8–32.5	6–37.7
Yards penalized	4–27	8–67

== National champions ==
Undefeated Nebraska (11–0–1) was named national champion in the final AP poll, released after the bowls in January. With the narrow defeat, LSU (9–3) fell only two spots, from fifth to seventh, its last top-10 finish until finishing fifth in 1987. The UPI coaches poll was released in early December (before the bowls) through the 1973 season; it had Texas as first, as it did not consider their 24–11 loss to Notre Dame—which defeated LSU 3–0 at South Bend in November—in the Cotton Bowl on New Year's Day.

== Cigarette advertising ==
In April 1970, Congress passed the Public Health Cigarette Smoking Act banning the advertising of cigarettes on television and radio; in order to allow the New Year's Day football games to keep their already-sold cigarette ads, the prohibition was set to begin on at midnight Eastern Standard Time January 2, 1971. Airing in prime time on the East Coast, the 1971 Orange Bowl thus became the last televised sporting event to carry cigarette ads, the final one (for Winston) airing at 10:54 p.m. (The last tobacco advertisement on network TV, for Virginia Slims, was shown at 11:59 p.m. during a break on The Tonight Show).

== Future meetings ==
The teams next met in the 1975 season opener at Lincoln, with the Cornhuskers prevailing 10–7. In the 1976 season opener at Baton Rouge, the top-ranked Cornhuskers escaped with a 6–6 tie after LSU's Mike Conway missed a 44-yard field goal in the closing seconds.

Nebraska won three bowl meetings vs. LSU in the 1980s: the 1983 Orange Bowl, 1985 Sugar Bowl and 1987 Sugar Bowl.

== Video ==
- You Tube - 1971 Orange Bowl - NBC telecast
