= 1970 Tennessee Volunteers football team =

American college football season

1970 Tennessee Volunteers football

Sugar Bowl champion

Sugar Bowl, W 34–13 vs. Air Force
- Conference: Southeastern Conference

Ranking
- Coaches: No. 4
- AP: No. 4
- Record: 11–1 (4–1 SEC)
- Head coach: Bill Battle (1st season)
- Captain: Tim Priest
- Home stadium: Neyland Stadium

1970 Southeastern Conference football standings
	Conf.					Overall
Team	W		L		T	W		L		T
No. 7 LSU $	5	–	0	–	0	9	–	3	–	0
No. 4 Tennessee	4	–	1	–	0	11	–	1	–	0
No. 10 Auburn	5	–	2	–	0	9	–	2	–	0
No. 20 Ole Miss	4	–	2	–	0	7	–	4	–	0
Florida	3	–	3	–	0	7	–	4	–	0
Georgia	3	–	3	–	0	5	–	5	–	0
Alabama	3	–	4	–	0	6	–	5	–	1
Mississippi State	3	–	4	–	0	6	–	5	–	0
Vanderbilt	1	–	5	–	0	4	–	7	–	0
Kentucky	0	–	7	–	0	2	–	9	–	0
$ – Conference champion; Rankings from AP Poll

The 1970 Tennessee Volunteers football team (variously "Tennessee", "UT" or the "Vols") represented the University of Tennessee in the 1970 NCAA University Division football season. Playing as a member of the Southeastern Conference (SEC), the team was led by head coach Bill Battle, in his first year, and played their home games at Neyland Stadium in Knoxville, Tennessee. They finished the season with a record of eleven wins and one loss (11–1 overall, 4–1 in the SEC) and a victory over Air Force in the Sugar Bowl. The 1970 Tennessee defense holds the record for most takeaways in a single season with 57, not including the bowl game in which they recorded 8 more.

== Schedule ==
Date	Opponent	Rank	Site	TV	Result	Attendance	Source
September 19	SMU*		Neyland Stadium; Knoxville, TN		W 28–3	54,158	
September 26	Auburn	No. 17	Legion Field; Birmingham, AL (rivalry)		L 23–36	65,306	
October 3	Army*		Neyland Stadium; Knoxville, TN		W 48–3	59,817	
October 10	at No. 13 Georgia Tech*	No. 20	Grant Field; Atlanta, GA (rivalry)		W 17–6	59,624	
October 17	Alabama	No. 14	Neyland Stadium; Knoxville, TN (Third Saturday in October)		W 24–0	64,947	
October 24	Florida	No. 11	Neyland Stadium; Knoxville, TN (rivalry)	ABC	W 38–7	64,069	
October 31	Wake Forest*	No. 9	Memphis Memorial Stadium; Memphis, TN		W 41–7	26,381	
November 7	at South Carolina*	No. 8	Carolina Stadium; Columbia, SC (rivalry)		W 20–18	42,788	
November 21	Kentucky^{†}	No. 8	Neyland Stadium; Knoxville, TN (rivalry)		W 45–0	63,452	
November 28	Vanderbilt	No. 7	Dudley Field; Nashville, TN (rivalry)		W 24–6	33,850	
December 5	UCLA*	No. 5	Neyland Stadium; Knoxville, TN		W 28–17	63,242	
January 1	vs. No. 11 Air Force	No. 4	Tulane Stadium; New Orleans, LA (Sugar Bowl)	ABC	W 34–13	78,655	
*Non-conference game; ^{†}Homecoming; Rankings from AP Poll released prior to the game

== Roster ==
1970 Tennessee Volunteers football team roster
Players
Coaches
Offense

Pos.	#	Name	Class
QB	10	Bobby Scott	Sr
G	65	Phillip Fulmer	Sr
G	50	Chip Kell	Sr
WR	85	Lester McClain	Sr

Defense

Pos.	#	Name	Class
DB	13	David Allen	So
DL	86	Tom Bennett	Jr
S	44	Bobby Majors	Jr
LB	58	Ray Nettles	Jr
OLB	52	Jackie Walker	Jr

Special teams

Pos.	#	Name	Class
K	9	George Hunt	Jr

Head coach

- Bill Battle

Coordinators/assistant coaches

Legend

- (C) Team captain
- (S) Suspended
- (I) Ineligible
- Injured
- Redshirt

== Team players drafted into the NFL ==
Player	Position	Round	Pick	NFL club
Lester McClain	Wide receiver	9	220	Chicago Bears
Bobby Scott	Quarterback	14	340	New Orleans Saints
Chip Kell	Center	17	429	San Diego Chargers
