= 1971 Gator Bowl (January) =

American college football game

Ole Miss Rebels	Auburn Tigers
(7–3)	(8–2)
SEC	SEC
28	35
Head coach: Johnny Vaught	Head coach: Ralph Jordan
	AP / Coaches; 10 / 9
	1	2	3	4	Total
Ole Miss	0	14	7	7	28
Auburn	14	7	14	0	35
- Date: January 2, 1971
- Season: 1970
- Stadium: Gator Bowl
- Location: Jacksonville, Florida
- MVP: Pat Sullivan (QB, Auburn); Archie Manning (QB, Ole Miss)
- Referee: James M. Artley (SEC)
- Attendance: 71,136

The 1971 Gator Bowl (January) was a college football postseason bowl game between the unranked Ole Miss Rebels and the 10th-ranked Auburn Tigers, both of the Southeastern Conference. It was played in Jacksonville, Florida, on January 2, 1971, the day after the major bowl games.

== Background ==
This was a matchup of two SEC teams, fourth-place Ole Miss and second-place Auburn, that rarely played each other. Although in the same conference, they had met only once since 1953, in the Liberty Bowl in December 1965.

The Rebels made their fourteenth straight bowl appearance in Johnny Vaught's final full season as head coach, but it was their first Gator Bowl since 1958. This was Archie Manning's final game as Rebel quarterback. This was Auburn's third straight bowl game and first Gator Bowl since 1955. Auburn quarterback Pat Sullivan won the Heisman Trophy the following season.

Neither head coach was on the sidelines for medical reasons: Johnny Vaught from a mild heart attack and Auburn's Ralph Jordan was recovering from an appendectomy.

== Scoring ==
First quarter

- Auburn – Terry Beasley 8 pass from Pat Sullivan (Gardner Jett kick)
- Auburn – Alvin Bresler 7 pass from Sullivan (Jett kick)

Second quarter

- Auburn – Sullivan 37 run (Jett kick)
- Ole Miss – Archie Manning 2 run (Poole kick)
- Ole Miss – Floyd Franks 34 pass from Manning (Poole kick)

Third quarter

- Auburn – Mickey Zofko 6 run (Jett kick)
- Ole Miss – Jim Poole 23 pass from Shug Chumbler (Poole kick)
- Auburn – Larry Willingham 55 punt return (Jett kick)

Fourth quarter

- Ole Miss – Chumbler 1 run (Poole kick)

Auburn jumped out to a 21–0 lead and Ole Miss pulled to within seven at halftime, but could get no closer as the teams traded touchdowns in the second half. Manning went 19-of-28 for 180 yards while rushing for 95 yards on 11 carries, with two touchdowns and one interception. Sullivan went 27-of-43 for 351 yards and rushed for 35 yards on 10 carries, with three touchdowns and one interception.

== Aftermath ==
Vaught was replaced by Billy Kinard before the next season started. Kinard reached one bowl in his tenure before being fired midway through the 1973 season, and Vaught replaced Kinard for the final eight games, going 5–3. Ralph Jordan led Auburn for five additional seasons and the Tigers reached four more bowl games.

== Statistics ==
Statistics	Ole Miss	Auburn
First downs	21	23
Rushing yards	209	208
Passing yards	256	351
Total yards	465	559
Passes (C–A–I)	23–39–1	27–44–1
Punts–average	6–47.3	4–40.5
Fumbles lost	4	2
Penalties–yards	2–13	6–63

== See also ==
- Auburn–Ole Miss football rivalry
