= 1970 LSU Tigers football team =

American college football season

1970 LSU Tigers football

SEC champion

Orange Bowl, L 12–17 vs. Nebraska
- Conference: Southeastern Conference

Ranking
- Coaches: No. 6
- AP: No. 7
- Record: 9–3 (5–0 SEC)
- Head coach: Charles McClendon (9th season)
- Offensive scheme: I formation
- Base defense: 4–3
- Home stadium: Tiger Stadium

1970 Southeastern Conference football standings
	Conf.					Overall
Team	W		L		T	W		L		T
No. 7 LSU $	5	–	0	–	0	9	–	3	–	0
No. 4 Tennessee	4	–	1	–	0	11	–	1	–	0
No. 10 Auburn	5	–	2	–	0	9	–	2	–	0
No. 20 Ole Miss	4	–	2	–	0	7	–	4	–	0
Florida	3	–	3	–	0	7	–	4	–	0
Georgia	3	–	3	–	0	5	–	5	–	0
Alabama	3	–	4	–	0	6	–	5	–	1
Mississippi State	3	–	4	–	0	6	–	5	–	0
Vanderbilt	1	–	5	–	0	4	–	7	–	0
Kentucky	0	–	7	–	0	2	–	9	–	0
$ – Conference champion; Rankings from AP Poll

The 1970 LSU Tigers football team represented Louisiana State University during the 1970 NCAA University Division football season.

Following a 3–0 loss to No. 2 Notre Dame at South Bend, LSU was extended a bid to face Big Eight Conference champion Nebraska in the Orange Bowl. However, the bid was contingent on the Tigers defeating both Tulane at New Orleans and Ole Miss at Baton Rouge in the final two weeks of the season.

Still steaming about being shut out of the major bowl games in 1969 despite a 9–1 record, LSU responded to the challenge. The Tigers overcame a stubborn Tulane squad, which went on to defeat Colorado in the Liberty Bowl, and then dismantled Ole Miss 61–17 in front of a large television audience and nearly 70,000 fans in Tiger Stadium. In that game, Tommy Casanova tied an NCAA record with two punt return touchdowns in a single game, Craig Burns returned a third punt for a touchdown, and Ronnie Estay sacked Rebel quarterback Archie Manning for a safety.

In the Orange Bowl, LSU led Nebraska 12-10 after three quarters, but a late touchdown by Jerry Tagge lifted the Cornhuskers to a 17–12 victory and the Associated Press national championship.

Casanova and linebacker Mike Anderson were recognized as consensus All-Americans.

As of 2025, this is the last season in which LSU did not play Florida. The Tigers and Gators will not play in 2026 unless they meet in the SEC Championship Game.

== Schedule ==
Date	Opponent	Rank	Site	TV	Result	Attendance	Source
September 19	Texas A&M*	No. 12	Tiger Stadium; Baton Rouge, LA (rivalry)		L 18–20	67,590	
September 26	Rice*		Tiger Stadium; Baton Rouge, LA		W 24–0	65,000	
October 3	Baylor*		Tiger Stadium; Baton Rouge, LA		W 31–10	60,000	
October 10	Pacific (CA)*	No. 19	Tiger Stadium; Baton Rouge, LA		W 34–0	48,000	
October 17	Kentucky^{†}	No. 15	Tiger Stadium; Baton Rouge, LA		W 14–7	67,508	
October 24	at No. 6 Auburn	No. 14	Cliff Hare Stadium; Auburn, AL (rivalry)		W 17–9	62,301–62,392	
November 7	at No. 19 Alabama	No. 11	Legion Field; Birmingham, AL (rivalry)	ABC	W 14–9	60,371	
November 14	Mississippi State	No. 9	Tiger Stadium; Baton Rouge, LA (rivalry)		W 38–7	64,000	
November 21	at No. 2 Notre Dame*	No. 6	Notre Dame Stadium; Notre Dame, IN		L 0–3	59,075	
November 28	at Tulane*	No. 6	Tulane Stadium; New Orleans, LA (Battle for the Rag)		W 26–14	81,233	
December 5	No. 16 Ole Miss	No. 8	Tiger Stadium; Baton Rouge, LA (rivalry)	ABC	W 61–17	67,590	
January 1, 1971	vs. No. 3 Nebraska*	No. 5	Miami Orange Bowl; Miami, FL (Orange Bowl)	NBC	L 12–17	80,699	
*Non-conference game; ^{†}Homecoming; Rankings from AP Poll released prior to the game

== Roster ==
1970 LSU Tigers football team roster
Players
Coaches
Offense

Pos.	#	Name	Class
C	71	Dennis Mclean (C)	Sr
HB	24	Art Cantrelle	Jr
SB	3	Al Coffee	So
WR	80	Andy Hamilton	Jr
QB	18	Buddy Lee	Sr
QB	7	Bert Jones	So

Defense

Pos.	#	Name	Class
LB	45	Mike Anderson	Sr
DB	37	Tommy Casanova	Jr
DT	78	Ron Estay	Jr
DT	73	John Sage	Sr
DE	79	John Wood	So

Special teams

Pos.	#	Name	Class
K	25	Mark Lumpkin	Sr

Head coach

- Charles McClendon

Coordinators/assistant coaches

Legend

- (C) Team captain
- (S) Suspended
- (I) Ineligible
- Injured
- Redshirt

Roster

== Team players drafted into the NFL ==
Player	Position	Round	Pick	NFL team
Buddy Lee	Quarterback	7	126	Chicago Bears
Mike Anderson	Linebacker	9	216	New York Jets
John Sage	Linebacker	17	420	Philadelphia
Dennis Mclean	Offensive Lineman	10	261	Pittsburgh Steelers (He decided to serve in Vietnam rather than join the NFL)
