= 1970 Auburn Tigers football team =

American college football season

1970 Auburn Tigers football

Gator Bowl champion

Gator Bowl, W 35–28 vs. Ole Miss
- Conference: Southeastern Conference

Ranking
- Coaches: No. 9
- AP: No. 10
- Record: 9–2 (5–2 SEC)
- Head coach: Ralph Jordan (20th season)
- Captain: Ronnie Ross
- Home stadium: Cliff Hare Stadium; Legion Field

1970 Southeastern Conference football standings
	Conf.					Overall
Team	W		L		T	W		L		T
No. 7 LSU $	5	–	0	–	0	9	–	3	–	0
No. 4 Tennessee	4	–	1	–	0	11	–	1	–	0
No. 10 Auburn	5	–	2	–	0	9	–	2	–	0
No. 20 Ole Miss	4	–	2	–	0	7	–	4	–	0
Florida	3	–	3	–	0	7	–	4	–	0
Georgia	3	–	3	–	0	5	–	5	–	0
Alabama	3	–	4	–	0	6	–	5	–	1
Mississippi State	3	–	4	–	0	6	–	5	–	0
Vanderbilt	1	–	5	–	0	4	–	7	–	0
Kentucky	0	–	7	–	0	2	–	9	–	0
$ – Conference champion; Rankings from AP Poll

The 1970 Auburn Tigers football team represented Auburn University in the 1970 NCAA University Division football season. Under the leadership of head coach Ralph Jordan, Tigers completed the regular season with a record of 8–2. Auburn won the Gator Bowl against Ole Miss by a score of 35–28. They completed the season with a record of 9–2 and were ranked No. 10 in the AP poll and No. 9 in the Coaches Poll.

The Tigers broke the Southeastern Conference (SEC) record for total yards for the regular season up to that point with 4,850, exceeding the previous record of 4,725 yards set by the 1942 Georgia Bulldogs. They had 1,965 yards rushing and 2,885 yards passing."

This was the first season the NCAA permitted University Division teams to schedule 11 games, but Auburn was one of three SEC members which did not, along with Georgia and Ole Miss.

== Schedule ==
Date	Opponent	Rank	Site	Result	Attendance	Source
September 19	Southern Miss*		Cliff Hare Stadium; Auburn, AL	W 33–14	48,500	
September 26	No. 17 Tennessee		Legion Field; Birmingham, AL (rivalry)	W 36–23	65,306	
October 3	at Kentucky	No. 12	McLean Stadium; Lexington, KY	W 33–15	37,500	
October 10	at Clemson*	No. 9	Memorial Stadium; Clemson, SC (rivalry)	W 44–0	32,806–41,202	
October 17	No. 16 Georgia Tech*	No. 8	Cliff Hare Stadium; Auburn, AL (rivalry)	W 31–7	62,391	
October 24	No. 14 LSU^{†}	No. 6	Cliff Hare Stadium; Auburn, AL (rivalry)	L 9–17	62,301–62,392	
October 31	at Florida	No. 12	Florida Field; Gainesville, FL (rivalry)	W 63–14	62,560	
November 7	Mississippi State	No. 10	Legion Field; Birmingham, AL	W 56–0	45,000	
November 14	Georgia	No. 8	Cliff Hare Stadium; Auburn, AL (rivalry)	L 17–31	61,791	
November 28	vs. Alabama	No. 11	Legion Field; Birmingham, AL (Iron Bowl)	W 33–28	71,774	
January 2	vs. Ole Miss*	No. 10	Gator Bowl Stadium; Jacksonville, FL (Gator Bowl, rivalry)	W 35–28	71,136	
*Non-conference game; ^{†}Homecoming; Rankings from AP Poll released prior to the game

== Game summaries ==
=== Tennessee ===
The first big test of the season came against Tennessee in Birmingham, Alabama. Tennessee came in ranked #17 in the country and Auburn was not ranked. Auburn overcame a 10–0 deficit to win 36–23. It was the only loss for Tennessee and cost them the SEC championship.

=== Florida ===
In a rivalry known for frequent close games, this one wasn't. It was the worst defeat for either side since 1917, when Auburn won 68–0. Pat Sullivan completed 21 of 27 passes for 366 yards and four touchdowns with three of them caught by Terry Beasley in the 63–14 drubbing. It was also Florida's homecoming game. It marked Auburn's fourth victory in a row against the Gators.

=== Tiger Bowl (LSU) ===
Auburn's first loss of the season came against LSU, which made its first visit to Auburn since 1908. LSU won its other conference games vs. Kentucky, Alabama, Mississippi State and Ole Miss to win the SEC championship. They did not play Tennessee.

=== Iron Bowl (Alabama) ===
Alabama scored first on an 80-yard touchdown drive 3:17 into the game; then drove 70 yards to add another. After a pair of turnovers, another drive of 71 yards stalled at the 9 and they added a field goal to take the lead 17–0. Auburn finally scored midway through the second half with a touchdown and added a field goal to make it 17–10 at the half. They would then tie the game at 17 midway through the third. Alabama added a field goal at the beginning of the 4th quarter and Auburn answered tying the game again. Auburn then took the lead 27–20 and the Tide answered with a two-point conversion to take the lead by one. With 3:56 left to go in the game, Wallace Clark dove in for a touchdown from the three giving Auburn the lead by 6. Pat Sullivan threw the two-pointer to Terry Beasley, but the play was nullified by illegal motion and the subsequent attempt was intercepted. Alabama was unable to score again and Auburn won 33–28.

Johnny Musso had over 200 yards rushing for the Tide and Pat Sullivan was 22 of 38 passing with 317 yards for Auburn.

=== Gator Bowl ===
In an unusual matchup between two teams from the same conference, Auburn met Ole Miss in the Gator Bowl. (The two teams did not meet during the regular season.) It was a matchup between two top quarterbacks, Pat Sullivan for Auburn and Archie Manning for the University of Mississippi. Archie Manning was recovering from a broken arm suffered on November 7, yet played against LSU a month later with his arm. Auburn won 35–28. Coach Jordan was unable to attend the game (Ole Miss coach Johnny Vaught also did not attend).

== Roster ==
1970 Auburn Tigers football team roster
Players
Coaches
Offense

Pos.	#	Name	Class
QB	7	Pat Sullivan	Jr
TB	15	Mickey Zofko	Sr
WR	88	Terry Beasley	Jr

Defense

Pos.	#	Name	Class
DB	28	Larry Willingham	Sr

Special teams

Pos.	#	Name	Class
P	4	David Beverly	So

Head coach

- Ralph Jordan

Coordinators/assistant coaches

Legend

- (C) Team captain
- (S) Suspended
- (I) Ineligible
- Injured
- Redshirt

Roster

== Awards and honors ==
- SEC Most Valuable Player: Pat Sullivan (QB)
- SEC Back of the Year–Birmingham QB Club: Pat Sullivan (QB)
- SEC Back of the Year–Atlanta TD Club: Pat Sullivan (QB)
- All-Americans: Pat Sullivan (QB), Terry Beasley (SE), Larry Willingham(DB)
- All-SEC first team: Pat Sullivan (QB), Terry Beasley (SE), Gardner Jett (SP), Larry Willingham (DB), Bobby Strickland (LB)
