= Auburn–Ole Miss football rivalry =

American college football rivalry

- Auburn Tigers Ole Miss Rebels
- First meeting: October 20, 1928; Ole Miss, 19–0
- Latest meeting: October 31, 2026; Ole Miss, 45–15
- Next meeting: 2028

Statistics
- Total meetings: 49
- All-time series: Auburn leads, 35–13
- Largest victory: Auburn, 41–0 (1985)
- Longest win streak: Auburn, 9 (1971–1991)
- Current win streak: Ole Miss, 3 (2022–present)

Locations of Auburn and Ole Miss

The Auburn–Ole Miss football rivalry is a college football rivalry game between the Tigers of Auburn University and the Rebels of the University of Mississippi.

== History ==
Both founding members of the Southeastern Conference, Auburn and Ole Miss first met on October 20, 1928, in Birmingham, Alabama with Ole Miss winning the game by a score of 19–0. After a 14–7 Auburn victory in 1932, the teams didn't meet again until 1949, when the Rebels defeated the Tigers by a score of 40–7. They have met in two bowl games, with Ole Miss winning the 1965 Liberty Bowl by a margin of 13–7 and Auburn winning the 1971 Gator Bowl by a score of 35–28. The Gator victory marked the beginning of the longest winning streak in the series, with Auburn winning nine straight between 1971 and 1991. Auburn and Ole Miss have met every year since 1990 and, with the SEC placing both Auburn and Ole Miss in the West division in 1992, the teams will continue to meet annually.

The rivalry took a heated turn in 1999 when then-Ole Miss head coach Tommy Tuberville, after stating days prior that he would only leave Ole Miss "in a pine box", accepted the head coaching position at Auburn. Shortly thereafter, some began to refer to the annual Auburn–Ole Miss football matchup as the Pine Box Bowl. In the first matchup between the squads after Tuberville's departure for Auburn, the Rebels defeated Auburn by a score of 24–17 in overtime. Since the 1999 contest, Ole Miss has defeated Auburn only five times, the most recent of which came in the form of a 28–21 win in 2023.

== Game results ==
Auburn victories	Ole Miss victories	Tie games

No.	Date	Location	Winning team		Losing team	
1	October 20, 1928	Birmingham, AL	Ole Miss	19	Auburn	0
2	October 29, 1932	Montgomery, AL	Auburn	14	Ole Miss	7
3	September 23, 1949	Montgomery, AL	Ole Miss	40	Auburn	7
4	November 10, 1951	Mobile, AL	Ole Miss	39	Auburn	14
5	October 4, 1952	Memphis, TN	#18 Ole Miss	20	Auburn	7
6	October 3, 1953	Auburn, AL	Auburn	13	Ole Miss	0
7	December 18, 1965	Memphis, TN	Ole Miss	13	Auburn	7
8	January 2, 1971	Jacksonville, FL	#10 Auburn	35	Ole Miss	28
9	October 7, 1972	Jackson, MS	#17 Auburn	19	#18 Ole Miss	13
10	October 6, 1973	Auburn, AL	Auburn	14	Ole Miss	7
11	October 2, 1976	Jackson, MS	Auburn	10	Ole Miss	0
12	October 1, 1977	Auburn, AL	Auburn	21	Ole Miss	15
13	October 6, 1984	Oxford, MS	#18 Auburn	17	Ole Miss	13
14	October 5, 1985	Auburn, AL	#14 Auburn	41	Ole Miss	0
15	September 15, 1990	Jackson, MS	#2 Auburn	24	Ole Miss	10
16	September 14, 1991	Auburn, AL	#15 Auburn	23	Ole Miss	13
17	September 5, 1992	Oxford, MS	Ole Miss	45	Auburn	21
18	September 2, 1993	Auburn, AL	Auburn	16	Ole Miss	12
19	September 3, 1994	Oxford, MS	#12 Auburn	22	Ole Miss	17
20	September 2, 1995	Auburn, AL	#6 Auburn	46	Ole Miss	13
21	September 14, 1996	Oxford, MS	#15 Auburn	45	Ole Miss	28
22	September 13, 1997	Auburn, AL	#16 Auburn	19	Ole Miss	9
23	September 12, 1998	Oxford, MS	Auburn	17	Ole Miss	0
24	September 25, 1999	Auburn, AL	Ole Miss	24	Auburn	17
25	September 9, 2000	Oxford, MS	Auburn	35	Ole Miss	27
26	September 8, 2001	Auburn, AL	Auburn	27	Ole Miss	21
27	November 2, 2002	Oxford, MS	Auburn	31	Ole Miss	24
28	November 8, 2003	Auburn, AL	#20 Ole Miss	24	Auburn	20
29	October 30, 2004	Oxford, MS	#3 Auburn	35	Ole Miss	14
30	October 29, 2005	Auburn, AL	#19 Auburn	27	Ole Miss	3
31	October 28, 2006	Oxford, MS	#7 Auburn	23	Ole Miss	17
32	October 27, 2007	Auburn, AL	#23 Auburn	17	Ole Miss	3
33	November 1, 2008	Oxford, MS	Ole Miss	17	Auburn	7
34	October 31, 2009	Auburn, AL	Auburn	33	Ole Miss	20
35	October 30, 2010	Oxford, MS	#1 Auburn	51	Ole Miss	31
36	October 29, 2011	Auburn, AL	#23 Auburn	41	Ole Miss	23
37	October 13, 2012	Oxford, MS	Ole Miss†	41	Auburn	20
38	October 5, 2013	Auburn, AL	Auburn	30	Ole Miss	22
39	November 1, 2014	Oxford, MS	#3 Auburn	35	#4 Ole Miss	31
40	October 31, 2015	Auburn, AL	#19 Ole Miss	27	Auburn	19
41	October 29, 2016	Oxford, MS	#15 Auburn	40	Ole Miss	29
42	October 7, 2017	Auburn, AL	#12 Auburn	44	Ole Miss	23
43	October 20, 2018	Oxford, MS	Auburn	31	Ole Miss	16
44	November 2, 2019	Auburn, AL	#11 Auburn	20	Ole Miss	14
45	October 24, 2020	Oxford, MS	Auburn	35	Ole Miss	28
46	October 30, 2021	Auburn, AL	#18 Auburn	31	#10 Ole Miss	20
47	October 15, 2022	Oxford, MS	#9 Ole Miss	48	Auburn	34
48	October 21, 2023	Auburn, AL	#13 Ole Miss	28	Auburn	21
49	October 31, 2026	Oxford, MS	#12 Ole Miss	45	Auburn	15
Series: Auburn leads 35–13
† 2012 game vacated by Ole Miss

== See also ==
- List of NCAA college football rivalry games
