= 1970 Ole Miss Rebels football team =

American college football season

1970 Ole Miss Rebels football

Gator Bowl, L 28–35 vs. Auburn
- Conference: Southeastern Conference

Ranking
- AP: No. 20
- Record: 7–4 (4–2 SEC)
- Head coach: Johnny Vaught (24th season)
- Home stadium: Hemingway Stadium; Mississippi Veterans Memorial Stadium

1970 Southeastern Conference football standings
	Conf.					Overall
Team	W		L		T	W		L		T
No. 7 LSU $	5	–	0	–	0	9	–	3	–	0
No. 4 Tennessee	4	–	1	–	0	11	–	1	–	0
No. 10 Auburn	5	–	2	–	0	9	–	2	–	0
No. 20 Ole Miss	4	–	2	–	0	7	–	4	–	0
Florida	3	–	3	–	0	7	–	4	–	0
Georgia	3	–	3	–	0	5	–	5	–	0
Alabama	3	–	4	–	0	6	–	5	–	1
Mississippi State	3	–	4	–	0	6	–	5	–	0
Vanderbilt	1	–	5	–	0	4	–	7	–	0
Kentucky	0	–	7	–	0	2	–	9	–	0
$ – Conference champion; Rankings from AP Poll

The 1970 Ole Miss Rebels football team represented the University of Mississippi during the 1970 NCAA University Division football season and in the 1971 Gator Bowl against Auburn where Ole Miss lost 35–28. Archie Manning was the quarterback for Ole Miss. This also marked the last season of coach Johnny Vaught's first tenure as the Ole Miss coach.

Manning broke his left forearm when he fell on the artificial turf of Hemingway Stadium during the homecoming game vs. Houston. He missed the Rebels' next two games, including a stunning Egg Bowl loss, then returned for the regular season finale vs. LSU wearing a heavy cast. He also played in the Gator Bowl wearing the cast.

Vaught was stricken with a heart attack during Ole Miss' open week in late October (the Rebels were originally scheduled to play LSU in Baton Rouge on Halloween, but the game had been shifted to the first Saturday of December so it could be televised by ABC). Assistant Bruiser Kinard served as interim coach for the last four regular season games and the Gator Bowl. In his role as athletic director, Bruiser named brother Billy Kinard as football coach for 1971.

Ole Miss was one of three SEC teams, along with Auburn and Georgia, which did not schedule an 11th game.

== Schedule ==
Date	Time	Opponent	Rank	Site	TV	Result	Attendance	Source
September 19	7:30 p.m.	at Memphis State*	No. 5	Memphis Memorial Stadium; Memphis, TN (rivalry)		W 47–13	50,164	
September 26		Kentucky	No. 5	Mississippi Veterans Memorial Stadium; Jackson, MS		W 20–17	46,200	
October 3		No. 17 Alabama	No. 7	Mississippi Veterans Memorial Stadium; Jackson, MS (rivalry)	ABC	W 48–23	46,821	
October 10		at Georgia	No. 5	Sanford Stadium; Athens, GA		W 31–21	59,310	
October 17		Southern Miss*	No. 4	Hemingway Stadium; Oxford, MS		L 14–30	27,200	
October 24		at Vanderbilt	No. 13	Dudley Field; Nashville, TN (rivalry)		W 26–16	34,000	
November 7		No. 18 Houston*^{†}	No. 13	Hemingway Stadium; Oxford, MS		W 24–13	36,535	
November 14		Chattanooga*	No. 12	Hemingway Stadium; Oxford, MS		W 44–7	15,137	
November 26		Mississippi State	No. 10	Hemingway Stadium; Oxford, MS (Egg Bowl)		L 14–19	35,000	
December 5		at No. 8 LSU	No. 16	Tiger Stadium; Baton Rouge, LA (rivalry)	ABC	L 17–61	67,590	
January 2, 1971		No. 10 Auburn*		Gator Bowl Stadium; Jacksonville, FL (Gator Bowl, rivalry)	NBC	L 28–35	71,136	
*Non-conference game; ^{†}Homecoming; Rankings from AP Poll released prior to the game; All times are in Central time; Source:

== Game summaries ==
=== Houston ===
No. 18 Houston Cougars at Np. 13 Ole Miss Rebels

Quarter	1	2	3	4	Total
Houston	0	7	0	7	14
Ole Miss	14	0	3	7	24

at Hemingway Stadium, Oxford, Mississippi

- Date: November 7, 1970
- Game attendance: 36,535

Game information

First quarter

- MISS – Randy Reed 14-yard pass from Archie Manning (Jim Poole kick). Ole Miss 7–0. Drive: 9 plays, 83 yards.
- MISS – Bob Knight 5-yard pass from Archie Manning (Jim Poole kick). Ole Miss 14–0. Drive:

Second quarter

- HOU – Robert Newhouse 11-yard run (Carlos Lopez kick), 1:11. Ole Miss 14–7. Drive:

Third quarter

- MISS – Cloyce Hinton 58-yard field goal. Ole Miss 17–7. Drive:

Fourth quarter

- MISS – Vernon Studdard 3-yard pass from Shug Chumbler (Jim Poole kick). Ole Miss 24–7. Drive: 3 plays, 5 yards.
- HOU – touchdown (kick failed). Ole Miss 24–13. Drive:

Top passers

- HOU – Gerry Mullins – 7/23, 78 yards, 4 INT
- MISS –

Top rushers

- HOU – Robert Newhouse – 15 rushes, 148 yards, TD
- MISS –

Top receivers

- HOU –
- MISS –

Homecoming

Archie Manning broke his left forearm less than five minutes into the third quarter after being sandwiched between two defenders with Ole Miss leading 14–7.

=== Gator Bowl ===
- Jim Poole 9 Rec, 111 Yds, TD

== Roster ==
1970 Ole Miss Rebels football team roster
Players
Coaches
Offense

Pos.	#	Name	Class
RB	25	Stephen Ainsworth	So
G	62	Dave Bridgers	Sr
OT	77	Robert Burke	Jr
QB	10	Shug Chumbler	Jr
G	67	Billy Coker	Sr
WR	87	Floyd Franks	Sr
G	63	Skip Jernigan	Sr
RB	28	Bob Knight	Jr
QB	18	Archie Manning	Sr
OT	73	Worthy McClure	Sr
OT	76	Buddy Mitchell	Sr
TE	89	Jim Poole	Jr
RB	24	Randy Reed	Jr
WR	81	Vernon Studdard	Sr
FB	20	Luther Webb	So
C	52	Wimpy Winther	Sr

Defense

Pos.	#	Name	Class
DT	72	John Aldridge	Sr
DT	79	Elmer Allen	Jr
LB	45	Crowell Armstrong	Jr
DB	37	Ken Blount	So
LB	46	Freddie Brister	Sr
DE	83	Preston Carpenter	Jr
DE	48	Dennis Coleman	Sr
LB	50	Reggie Dill	So
LB	42	Paul Dongieux	Jr
CB	35	Freddie Farmer	Sr
CB	39	Ray Heidel	Sr
S	30	Danny Hooker	Sr
LB	44	Jeff Horn	Sr
DB	34	Tommy Magee	Sr
CB	32	Wyck Neely	Sr
CB	36	Danny Stallings	So
DT	75	Larry Torgerson	Sr
DB	38	Bill Van Devender	Sr

Special teams

Pos.	#	Name	Class
K	91	Cloyce Hinton	Jr

Head coach

- Johnny Vaught

Coordinators/assistant coaches

Legend

- (C) Team captain
- (S) Suspended
- (I) Ineligible
- Injured
- Redshirt

== Awards and honors ==
- Archie Manning, All-SEC, third in Heisman Trophy voting

== Players selected in 1971 NFL draft ==
Player	Round	Pick	Position	Club
Archie Manning	1	2	Quarterback	New Orleans Saints
Wimpy Winther	4	88	Center	New Orleans Saints
Adam Mitchell	4	103	Tackle	Dallas Cowboys
Fred Brister	5	128	Linebacker	Pittsburgh Steelers
Dennis Coleman	6	151	Linebacker	Miami Dolphins
Wyck Neely	6	154	Defensive back	Philadelphia Eagles
Worthy McClure	7	164	Tackle	Pittsburgh Steelers
Vernon Studdard	11	266	Wide receiver	New York Jets
Floyd Franks	12	295	Wide receiver	Denver Broncos
