= Poly-Turf =

Brand of artificial turf

Poly-Turf was a brand of artificial turf in the early 1970s, manufactured by American Biltrite of Wellesley, Massachusetts. It was the first specifically designed for American football, with a patented layered structure which included a "shock pad" between the artificial grass and the asphalt sub-surface. It used polypropylene for its artificial grass blades, rather than the nylon used in AstroTurf and 3M's Tartan Turf.

== History in Miami ==
In the late 1960s, the natural grass surface at the Orange Bowl in Miami was constantly in poor condition, primarily due to heavy usage; 34 games were scheduled there during the 1968 football season.

Poly-Turf was installed at the city-owned stadium in 1970, and utilized for six seasons. The stadium was used for both college and professional football, primarily by the University of Miami Hurricanes and the Miami Dolphins of the NFL. It also hosted the eponymous New Year's Day college bowl game, Super Bowl games, and high school football.

The University of Nebraska Cornhuskers won the first three Orange Bowl games played on Poly-Turf, which included two national championships. The first Super Bowl played on artificial turf was played on Poly-Turf in the Orange Bowl in January 1971, when the Baltimore Colts defeated the Dallas Cowboys 16-13 in Super Bowl V. The next Super Bowl at the stadium was the final game played on Poly-Turf in Miami; Super Bowl X in January 1976. Its flaws received additional media exposure the week prior to the game, and Dolphins receiver Nat Moore documented them in a local article.

The longer polypropylene blades of Poly-Turf tended to mat down and become very slick under hot & sunny conditions. Other NFL owners were skeptical of the brand before the first regular season games were played in 1970. The field was replaced after two seasons, before the Dolphins' 1972 undefeated season. It was replaced by another Poly-Turf surface. While it had similar problems, it lasted longer than the first installation, and was used for four years. Over just six years, both installations deteriorated rapidly and some football players suffered an increasing number of leg and ankle injuries; some players claimed to trip over seams. Prior to the second installation in 1972, the city did not consult with the Dolphins about the replacement; Dolphins' head coach Don Shula preferred a different brand, either AstroTurf or Tartan Turf. The field discolored from green to blue due to the severe UV nature of the Miami sun.

=== Return to natural grass ===
The city removed the Poly-Turf in 1976 and re-installed natural grass, a special type known as Prescription Athletic Turf (PAT), which remained until the stadium's closure in early 2008. As late as December 1975, the city had planned to retain the Poly-Turf for the 1976 season, but that decision was changed a few weeks later, prior to the Super Bowl.

The Orange Bowl became the first major football venue to replace its artificial turf with natural grass, and it was the third NFL stadium to install Prescription Athletic Turf; Denver's Mile High Stadium and Washington's RFK Stadium installed PAT fields a year earlier in the spring of 1975.

== Other installations ==
Other NFL stadiums which installed Poly-Turf included Schaefer Stadium, opened in 1971 for the New England Patriots, and Tulane Stadium in New Orleans, home of the Saints, Tulane University, and the Sugar Bowl. Notable college stadiums included Legion Field in Birmingham, Alabama and Alumni Stadium at Boston College.

American Biltrite ceased production of Poly-Turf in 1973; 3M stopped the manufacture of its Tartan Turf in 1974, citing rising oil prices in light of the 1973 oil embargo. This left AstroTurf as the only major manufacturer of artificial turf (with only minor competition along the way) until FieldTurf was introduced in the late 1990s.
