= Jack Musick =

American football player and coach

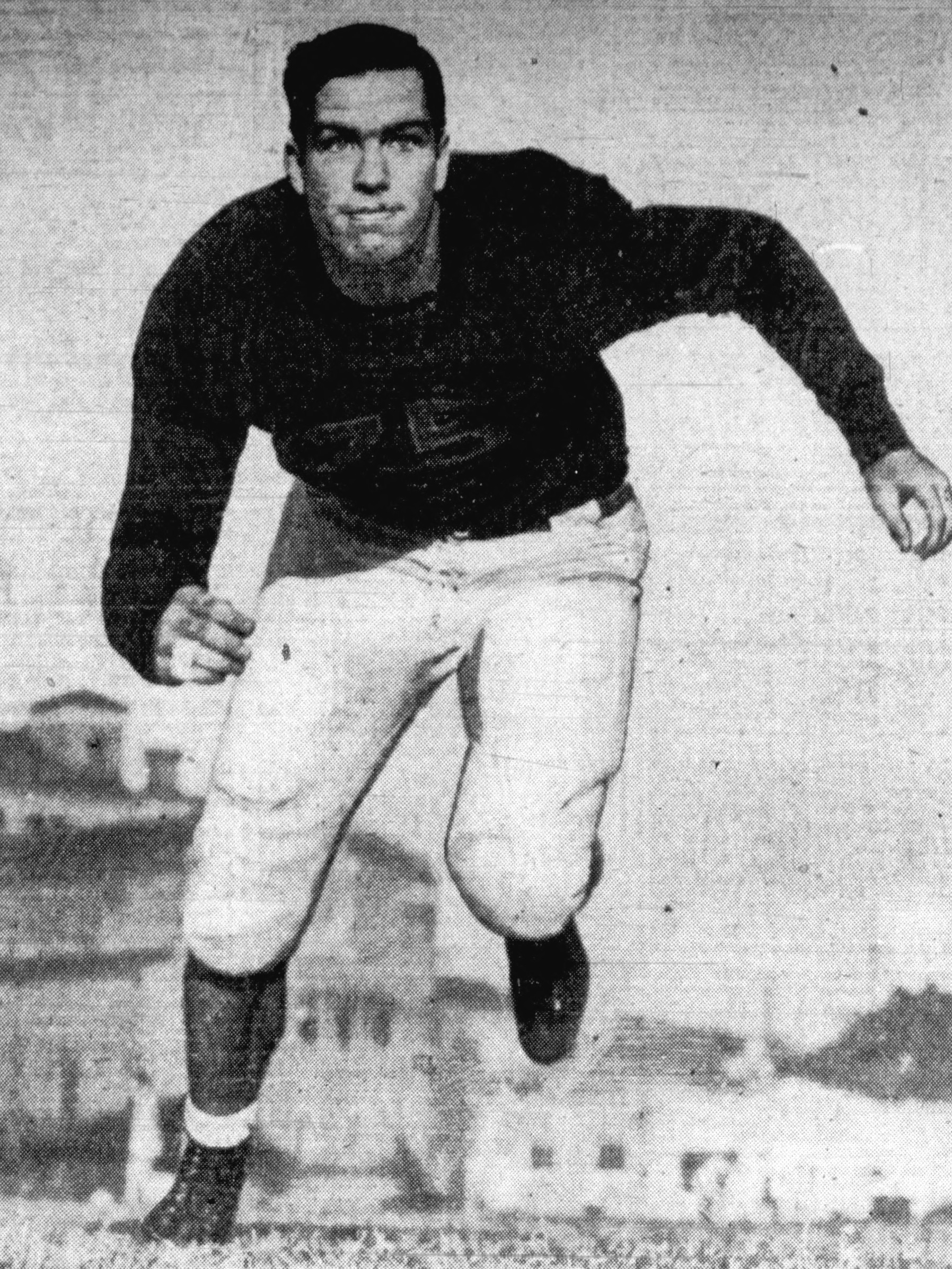
- Musick, circa 1945

Biographical details
- Born: c. 1925
- Died: November 27, 1977 (aged 52); Clear Lake, Texas, U.S.

Playing career
- 1944–1946: USC
- Position: Guard

Coaching career (HC unless noted)
- 1947–1948: Monrovia HS (CA) (assistant)
- 1949–1950: Pasadena City (assistant)
- 1951–1952: Hart HS (CA)
- 1953–1954: Denver (line)
- 1955–1965: Dartmouth (line)
- 1966–1974: Cornell

Head coaching record
- Overall: 45–33–3 (college)

Accomplishments and honors

Championships
- 1 Ivy (1971)

Awards
- Second-team All-PCC (1945)

John Elmore Musick (c. 1925 – November 27, 1977) was an American football player and coach. He served as the head football coach at Cornell University from 1966 to 1974.

Musick played as a lineman at the University of Southern California (USC) from 1944 to 1946. In 1947 he became an assistant coach under Bob Blackman at Monrovia High School in Monrovia, California, and then followed him to Pasadena City College in 1949. In 1951 Musick became head coach at Hart High School. In 1953, he rejoined Bob Blackman at University of Denver where he served as head line coach. Musick worked in that capacity under Blackman for the next 13 years, including 11 after 1955 when both were hired by Dartmouth College. Dartmouth won four Ivy League titles with Musick coaching under Blackman.

After replacing Tom Harp at Cornell, Musick won Cornell's first official Ivy League title in 1971, and coached top rusher Ed Marinaro. In 1971 Musick was also named Division I Coach of the Year by the American Football Coaches Association. However, after back-to-back losing seasons in 1973 and 1974, and several recruiting scandals hit other sports at Cornell, Musick was terminated by the university at the end of the 1974 season. His final record was 45–33–3.

Musick died at the age of 52 on November 27, 1977, of cancer at a hospital in Clear Lake, Texas.

== Head coaching record ==
=== College ===
| Year | Team | Overall | Conference | Standing | Bowl/playoffs |
|---|---|---|---|---|---|
Cornell Big Red (Ivy League) (1966–1974)
| 1966 | Cornell | 6–3 | 4–3 | 4th | |
| 1967 | Cornell | 6–2–1 | 4–2–1 | 3rd | |
| 1968 | Cornell | 3–6 | 1–6 | 7th | |
| 1969 | Cornell | 4–5 | 4–3 | 4th | |
| 1970 | Cornell | 6–3 | 4–3 | 4th | |
| 1971 | Cornell | 8–1 | 4–1 | T–1st | |
| 1972 | Cornell | 6–3 | 4–3 | T–3rd | |
| 1973 | Cornell | 3–5–1 | 2–5 | 6th | |
| 1974 | Cornell | 3–5–1 | 1–5–1 | 7th | |
| Cornell: | | 45–33–3 | 30–31–2 | | |
| Total: | | 45–33–3 | | | |
National championship Conference title Conference division title or championship game berth
