= 1973 Yale Bulldogs football team =

American college football season

1973 Yale Bulldogs football
- Conference: Ivy League
- Record: 6–3 (5–2 Ivy)
- Head coach: Carmen Cozza (9th season)
- Home stadium: Yale Bowl

1973 Ivy League football standings
	Conf.					Overall
Team	W		L		T	W		L		T
Dartmouth $	6	–	1	–	0	6	–	3	–	0
Harvard	5	–	2	–	0	7	–	2	–	0
Penn	5	–	2	–	0	6	–	3	–	0
Yale	5	–	2	–	0	6	–	3	–	0
Brown	4	–	3	–	0	4	–	3	–	1
Cornell	2	–	5	–	0	3	–	5	–	1
Columbia	1	–	6	–	0	1	–	7	–	1
Princeton	0	–	7	–	0	1	–	8	–	0
$ – Conference champion

The 1973 Yale Bulldogs football team represented Yale University in the 1973 NCAA Division I football season. The Bulldogs were led by ninth-year head coach Carmen Cozza, played their home games at the Yale Bowl and finished tied for second place in the Ivy League with a 5–2 record, 6–3 overall.

== Schedule ==
Date	Opponent	Site	Result	Attendance	Source
September 29	Connecticut*	Yale Bowl; New Haven, CT	L 13–27	16,714	
October 6	Colgate*	Yale Bowl; New Haven, CT	W 24–18	14,000	
October 13	at Brown	Brown Stadium; Providence, RI	L 25–34	17,800	
October 20	at Columbia	Baker Field; New York, NY	W 29–0	14,886	
October 27	Cornell	Yale Bowl; New Haven, CT	W 20–3	22,585	
November 3	at Dartmouth	Memorial Field; Hanover, NH	L 13–24	19,000	
November 10	Penn	Yale Bowl; New Haven, CT	W 24–21	23,458	
November 17	at Princeton	Palmer Stadium; Princeton, NJ (rivalry)	W 30–13	31,000	
November 24	Harvard	Yale Bowl; New Haven, CT (The Game)	W 35–0	41,247	
*Non-conference game

== Roster ==
1973 Yale Bulldogs football team roster
Players
Coaches
Offense

Pos.	#	Name	Class
FB		John Douohue	Sr
QB	15	Tom Doyle	Jr
OT	70	Greg Dubinetz	Jr
WR		Gary Fencik	So

Defense

Pos.	#	Name	Class
LB	45	Gary Wilhelm	Sr
LB		Charlie Zupsic	So

Special teams

Pos.	#	Name	Class

Head coach

- Carmen Cozza

Coordinators/assistant coaches

Legend

- (C) Team captain
- (S) Suspended
- (I) Ineligible
- Injured
- Redshirt
