= 1972 Yale Bulldogs football team =

American college football season

1972 Yale Bulldogs football
- Conference: Ivy League
- Record: 7–2 (5–2 Ivy)
- Head coach: Carmen Cozza (8th season)
- Home stadium: Yale Bowl

1972 Ivy League football standings
	Conf.					Overall
Team	W		L		T	W		L		T
Dartmouth $	5	–	1	–	1	7	–	1	–	1
Yale	5	–	2	–	0	7	–	2	–	0
Penn	4	–	3	–	0	6	–	3	–	0
Cornell	4	–	3	–	0	6	–	3	–	0
Harvard	3	–	3	–	1	4	–	4	–	1
Princeton	2	–	4	–	1	3	–	5	–	1
Columbia	2	–	4	–	1	3	–	5	–	1
Brown	1	–	6	–	0	1	–	8	–	0
$ – Conference champion

The 1972 Yale Bulldogs football team represented Yale University in the 1972 NCAA University Division football season. The Bulldogs were led by eighth year head coach Carmen Cozza, played their home games at the Yale Bowl and finished in second place in the Ivy League with a 5–2 record, 7–2 overall.

== Schedule ==
Date	Opponent	Rank	Site	Result	Attendance	Source
September 30	Connecticut*		Yale Bowl; New Haven, CT	W 28–7	14,882	
October 7	Colgate*		Yale Bowl; New Haven, CT	W 27–7	6,074	
October 14	Brown		Yale Bowl; New Haven, CT	W 53–19	23,399	
October 21	Columbia		Yale Bowl; New Haven, CT	W 28–14	21,178	
October 28	at Cornell		Schoellkopf Field; Ithaca, NY	L 13–24	21,000	
November 4	Dartmouth		Yale Bowl; New Haven, CT	W 45–14	41,507	
November 11	at Penn	No. 20	Franklin Field; Philadelphia, PA	L 30–48	21,380	
November 18	Princeton		Yale Bowl; New Haven, CT (rivalry)	W 31–7	31,032	
November 25	at Harvard		Harvard Stadium; Boston, MA (The Game)	W 28–17	39,000	
*Non-conference game; Rankings from AP Poll released prior to the game

== Roster ==
1972 Yale Bulldogs football team roster
Players
Coaches
Offense

Pos.	#	Name	Class
FB	33	John Douohue	Jr
QB	15	Tom Doyle	So
OT	70	Greg Dubinetz	So
TE	85	Ken Hammerberg	Sr
RB	40	Dick Jauron	Sr
FB	22	Greg Mierzwinski	Sr
QB	10	Roy Purrington	Sr

Defense

Pos.	#	Name	Class
DT	63	Chris Byrd	So
DE	37	Sandy Cutler	Sr
DE	34	Ken Knodel	Jr
DB	16	Carl Lewis	Jr
DT	66	Bob Leyen	Sr
DB	19	Mike Noetzel	Sr
DE	80	Jack Ryan	So
DB	29	Jack Weber	Jr

Special teams

Pos.	#	Name	Class
P	20	Jim Nottingham	Sr

Head coach

- Carmen Cozza

Coordinators/assistant coaches

Legend

- (C) Team captain
- (S) Suspended
- (I) Ineligible
- Injured
- Redshirt

== NFL draft ==
The following Bulldogs were selected in the National Football League draft following the season.

Round	Pick	Player	Position	NFL team
4	91	Dick Jauron	DB	Detroit Lions
6	151	Bob Leyen	G	Dallas Cowboys
