= Joe Restic =

American gridiron football player and coach (1926–2011)

Biographical details
- Born: July 21, 1926; Emeigh Run, Pennsylvania, U.S.
- Died: December 8, 2011 (aged 85); Boston, Massachusetts, U.S.
- Education: Villanova

Playing career
- 1952–1953: Philadelphia Eagles
- Position: End

Coaching career (HC unless noted)
- 1956–1958: Brown (assistant)
- 1959–1961: Colgate (assistant)
- 1962–1967: Hamilton Tiger-Cats (assistant)
- 1968–1970: Hamilton Tiger-Cats
- 1971–1993: Harvard

Head coaching record
- Overall: 22–17–3 (CFL); 117–97–6 (college)

Accomplishments and honors

Championships
- 5 Ivy (1974–1975, 1982–1983, 1987)

Joseph William Restic (July 21, 1926 – December 8, 2011) was an American gridiron football player and coach. He served as the head coach for the Hamilton Tiger-Cats of the Canadian Football League (CFL) from 1968 to 1970 and as the head football coach at Harvard University from 1971 to 1993. He was known as a coaching innovator, devising a complex offense known as the multiflex while in Canada and taking it to Harvard.

== Playing career ==
Restic played college football at Saint Francis University and Villanova University and graduated in 1952. He played two seasons as an end in the National Football League (NFL) for the Philadelphia Eagles. He played professional baseball in the Philadelphia Phillies' farm system.

== Coaching career ==
From 1956 to 1958, he served as an assistant coach at Brown University. He was an assistant coach at Colgate University from 1959 to 1961. He joined the Hamilton Tiger-Cats as an assistant coach and later offensive coordinator. In 1968, he became the fourth head coach of the Hamilton Tiger-Cats, replacing Ralph Sazio. As head coach, he posted a 22–17–3 record.

On January 5, 1971, he became the head coach of Harvard. He was head coach for 23 years amassing a record of 117–97–6. He led Harvard to five Ivy League championships. When he retired in 1993, the 23 years that he coached at Harvard was the longest tenure in the school's 124 year football history.

Restic had a friendly rivalry with Yale coach Carmen Cozza who served as the Bulldogs coach for all of Restic's time at Harvard. During their period of the college football rivalry, known as The Game, Yale won 13 times to Harvard's 10.

Restic served as president of the American Football Coaches Association in 1988.

=== Multiflex offense ===
While coaching in Canada, Restic devised the multiflex offense, which encompassed numerous formations, blocking strategies and pass patterns, sometimes with shifts at the last moment. The idea was to confuse the opponents. Restic explained that it was designed to "create doubt in the best athletes." For example, he would line-up three receivers on one side of the field, and then have them sprint to the opposite side just before the snap.

In 1979, a professor and former Harvard quarterback, Larry Brown, created a class titled Fundamentals of Multiflex Offense to explain the maneuvers of the strategy. Some of the students included the Crimson's defensive players.

== Personal life ==
Restic was one of ten children. His father, Louis, was a coal miner. Restic married Marian, known as Bea, who died in 2008. He had three children; his son Joe was a punter and safety for the Notre Dame in the 1970s.

In his later years he lived in Milford, Massachusetts and died in Boston after several years of declining health.

== Head coaching record ==
=== College ===
Year	Team	Overall	Conference	Standing	Bowl/playoffs
Harvard Crimson (Ivy League) (1971–1993)
1971	Harvard	5–4	4–3	4th	
1972	Harvard	4–4–1	3–3–1	5th	
1973	Harvard	7–2	5–2	T–2nd	
1974	Harvard	7–2	6–1	T–1st	
1975	Harvard	7–2	6–1	1st	
1976	Harvard	6–3	4–3	T–3rd	
1977	Harvard	4–5	4–3	T–3rd	
1978	Harvard	4–4–1	2–4–1	T–5th	
1979	Harvard	3–6	3–4	6th	
1980	Harvard	7–3	4–3	T–3rd	
1981	Harvard	5–4–1	4–2–1	T–3rd	
1982	Harvard	7–3	5–2	T–1st	
1983	Harvard	6–2–2	5–1–1	T–1st	
1984	Harvard	5–4	5–2	T–2nd	
1985	Harvard	7–3	5–2	T–2nd	
1986	Harvard	3–7	3–4	5th	
1987	Harvard	8–2	6–1	1st	
1988	Harvard	2–8	2–5	T–7th	
1989	Harvard	5–5	5–2	3rd	
1990	Harvard	5–5	3–4	T–4th	
1991	Harvard	4–5–1	4–3	T–3rd	
1992	Harvard	3–7	3–4	5th	
1993	Harvard	3–7	1–6	T–7th	
Harvard:		117–97–6	92–65–4		
Total:		117–97–6			
National championship Conference title Conference division title or championship game berth
