= 1980 Dartmouth Big Green football team =

American college football season

1980 Dartmouth Big Green football
- Conference: Ivy League
- Record: 4–6 (4–3 Ivy)
- Head coach: Joe Yukica (3rd season)
- Home stadium: Memorial Field

1980 Ivy League football standings
	Conf.					Overall
Team	W		L		T	W		L		T
Yale $	6	–	1	–	0	8	–	2	–	0
Cornell	5	–	2	–	0	5	–	5	–	0
Harvard	4	–	3	–	0	7	–	3	–	0
Brown	4	–	3	–	0	6	–	4	–	0
Princeton	4	–	3	–	0	6	–	4	–	0
Dartmouth	4	–	3	–	0	4	–	6	–	0
Penn	1	–	6	–	0	1	–	9	–	0
Columbia	0	–	7	–	0	1	–	9	–	0
$ – Conference champion

The 1980 Dartmouth Big Green football team represented Dartmouth College as a member of the Ivy League the 1980 NCAA Division I-A football season. Led by third-year head coach Joe Yukica, the Big Green compiled an overall record of 4–6 with a mark of 4–3 in conference play, placing in a four-way tie for third in the Ivy League. Dartmouth played home games at Memorial Field in Hanover, New Hampshire.

== Schedule ==
Date	Opponent	Site	Result	Attendance	Source
September 20	Penn	Memorial Field; Hanover, NH	W 40–7	9,980	
September 27	New Hampshire*	Memorial Field; Hanover, NH (rivalry)	L 7–24	11,027	
October 4	at Holy Cross*	Fitton Field; Worcester, MA	L 7–13	15,783	
October 11	at William & Mary*	Cary Field; Williamsburg, VA	L 14–17	14,500	
October 18	Harvard	Memorial Field; Hanover, NH (rivalry)	W 30–12	20,000	
October 25	at Cornell	Schoellkopf Field; Ithaca, NY (rivalry)	L 3–7	4,500	
November 1	Yale	Memorial Field; Hanover, NH	L 7–35	16,111	
November 8	Columbia	Memorial Field; Hanover, NH	W 48–0	6,108	
November 15	at Brown	Brown Stadium; Providence, RI	W 28–24	5,917	
November 22	at Princeton	Palmer Stadium; Princeton, NJ	L 24–27	15,500	
*Non-conference game

== Roster ==
1980 Dartmouth Big Green football team roster
Players
Coaches
Offense

Pos.	#	Name	Class
OT	71	Joel Hubbard	Jr
QB	14	Jeff Kemp	Sr
FB	33	Peter Lavery	So
TE	83	Mike Lempres	Sr
FB	34	Richard Lena	So
WR	39	Peter Lindbom	Sr
G	64	Tom Marek	Sr
QB, DB	12	Joel McLaughlin	Sr
WR	13	Dave Shula	Sr

Defense

Pos.	#	Name	Class
LB	78	Jeff Johnson	Sr
DT	79	Matt Jurkoic	So
LB	40	David Neslund	So
LB	90	Jerry Pierce	Sr
LB	30	Steve Pignatiello	Sr

Special teams

Pos.	#	Name	Class

Head coach

- Joe Yukica

Coordinators/assistant coaches

Legend

- (C) Team captain
- (S) Suspended
- (I) Ineligible
- Injured
- Redshirt
