= 1970 Navy Midshipmen football team =

American college football season

1970 Navy Midshipmen football
- Conference: Independent
- Record: 2–9
- Head coach: Rick Forzano (2nd season)
- Captain: Bill McKinney
- Home stadium: Navy–Marine Corps Memorial Stadium

1970 NCAA University Division independents football records
	Conf.			Overall
Team	W	L	T	W		L		T
No. 2 Notre Dame		–		10	–	1	–	0
Villanova		–		9	–	2	–	0
No. 16 Air Force		–		9	–	3	–	0
No. 13 Georgia Tech		–		9	–	3	–	0
Boston College		–		8	–	2	–	0
No. 19 Houston		–		8	–	3	–	0
West Virginia		–		8	–	3	–	0
No. 17 Tulane		–		8	–	4	–	0
No. 18 Penn State		–		7	–	3	–	0
West Texas State		–		7	–	3	–	0
Cincinnati		–		7	–	4	–	0
Florida State		–		7	–	4	–	0
Virginia Tech		–		5	–	6	–	0
Syracuse		–		6	–	4	–	0
Dayton		–		5	–	4	–	1
Pittsburgh		–		5	–	5	–	0
Rutgers		–		5	–	5	–	0
Utah State		–		5	–	5	–	0
Colgate		–		5	–	6	–	0
Southern Miss		–		5	–	6	–	0
New Mexico State		–		4	–	6	–	0
Miami (FL)		–		3	–	8	–	0
Northern Illinois		–		3	–	7	–	0
Marshall		–		3	–	6	–	0
Buffalo		–		2	–	9	–	0
Navy		–		2	–	9	–	0
Army		–		1	–	9	–	1
Xavier		–		1	–	9	–	0
Holy Cross		–		0	–	10	–	1
Rankings from AP Poll

The 1970 Navy Midshipmen football team represented the United States Naval Academy (USNA) as an independent during the 1970 NCAA University Division football season. The team was led by second-year head coach Rick Forzano.

== Schedule ==
Date	Time	Opponent	Site	Result	Attendance	Source
September 12	2:05 p.m.	Colgate	Navy–Marine Corps Memorial Stadium; Annapolis, MD	W 48–22	14,286	
September 19	1:35 p.m.	at Penn State	Beaver Stadium; University Park, PA	L 7–55	48,566	
September 26	2:00 p.m.	Boston College	Navy–Marine Corps Memorial Stadium; Annapolis, MD	L 14–28	17,411	
October 3		at Washington	Husky Stadium; Seattle, WA	L 7–56	57,000	
October 10	2:00 p.m.	Pittsburgh^{†}	Navy–Marine Corps Memorial Stadium; Annapolis, MD	L 8–10	23,426	
October 17	2:00 p.m.	vs. Air Force	Robert F. Kennedy Memorial Stadium; Washington, DC (Commander-in-Chief's Trophy)	L 3–26	46,414	
October 24	1:30 p.m.	at Syracuse	Archbold Stadium; Syracuse, NY	L 8–23	28,732	
October 31	1:32 p.m.	vs. Notre Dame	John F. Kennedy Stadium; Philadelphia, PA (rivalry)	L 7–56	45,226	
November 7	2:00 p.m.	at Georgia Tech	Grant Field; Atlanta, GA	L 8–30	50,105	
November 14	1:30 p.m.	Villanova	Navy–Marine Corps Memorial Stadium; Annapolis, MD	L 10–14	13,587	
November 28	1:21 p.m.	vs. Army	John F. Kennedy Stadium; Philadelphia, PA (Army–Navy Game)	W 11–7	95,151	
^{†}Homecoming; All times are in Eastern time

== Roster ==
1970 Navy Midshipmen football team roster
Players
Coaches
Offense

Pos.	#	Name	Class
WR	25	Mick Barr	Jr
OT	73	Rich Been	So
G	72	Charles Boyer	Sr
QB	22	Ade Dillon	So
RB	21	Bob Elflein	So
WR	85	Jack Forde	So
C	58	Tim Hale	So
G	62	Bob Johnson	So
QB	15	Mike McNallen	Sr
OT	71	Michael Milo	Jr
WR	82	Scott Monson	Sr
WR	10	Tom Moore	Jr
WR	24	Gary Nowak	So
TE	14	Steve Ogden	So
WR	89	Karl Schwelm	Sr
OT	61	Wallace Winslow	Sr

Defense

Pos.	#	Name	Class
DB	33	Stephen Dmetruk	Sr
DB	40	Osmund Fretz	Sr
LB	54	David Howe	Sr
DE	84	David Lucas	So
DT	70	Bill McKinney	Sr
DT	76	Glen Nardi	Fr
DE	68	Tom O'Brien	Sr
DT	77	Mike O'Shaugnessy	So
LB	88	Rick Porterfield	Jr
DB	16	Mark Schickner	So
DB	26	James Soran	So
DB	48	Brad Stephan	So
LB	69	Chuck Voith	Jr

Special teams

Pos.	#	Name	Class

Head coach

- Rick Forzano

Coordinators/assistant coaches

Legend

- (C) Team captain
- (S) Suspended
- (I) Ineligible
- Injured
- Redshirt
