= 1972 Columbia Lions football team =

American college football season

1972 Columbia Lions football
- Conference: Ivy League
- Record: 3–5–1 (2–4–1 Ivy)
- Head coach: Frank Navarro (5th season)
- Captains: Don Jackson; Paul Kaliades; Jesse Parks
- Home stadium: Baker Field

1972 Ivy League football standings
	Conf.					Overall
Team	W		L		T	W		L		T
Dartmouth $	5	–	1	–	1	7	–	1	–	1
Yale	5	–	2	–	0	7	–	2	–	0
Penn	4	–	3	–	0	6	–	3	–	0
Cornell	4	–	3	–	0	6	–	3	–	0
Harvard	3	–	3	–	1	4	–	4	–	1
Princeton	2	–	4	–	1	3	–	5	–	1
Columbia	2	–	4	–	1	3	–	5	–	1
Brown	1	–	6	–	0	1	–	8	–	0
$ – Conference champion

The 1972 Columbia Lions football team was an American football team that represented Columbia University during the 1972 NCAA University Division football season. Columbia tied for sixth in the Ivy League.

In their fifth season under head coach Frank Navarro, the Lions compiled a 3–5–1 record but outscored opponents 143 to 125. Don Jackson, Paul Kaliades and Jesse Parks were the team captains.

The Lions' 2–4–1 conference record tied for sixth in the Ivy League standings. Columbia was outscored 118 to 96 by Ivy opponents.

Columbia played its home games at Baker Field in Upper Manhattan, in New York City.

== Schedule ==
Date	Opponent	Site	Result	Attendance	Source
September 30	Fordham*	Baker Field; New York, NY	W 44–0	6,845	
October 7	at Princeton	Palmer Stadium; Princeton, NJ	T 0–0	10,000	
October 14	Harvard^{†}	Baker Field; New York, NY	L 18–20	20,975	
October 21	at Yale	Yale Bowl; New Haven, CT	L 14–28	21,178	
October 28	Rutgers*	Baker Field; New York, NY	L 3–6	3,275	
November 4	Cornell	Baker Field; New York, NY (rivalry)	W 14–0	13,463	
November 11	at Dartmouth	Memorial Field; Hanover, NH	L 8–38	15,200	
November 18	at Penn	Franklin Field; Philadelphia, PA	L 14–20	27,803	
November 25	Brown	Baker Field; New York, NY	W 28–12	5,303	
*Non-conference game; ^{†}Homecoming
