= 1972 Brown Bears football team =

American college football season

1972 Brown Bears football
- Conference: Ivy League
- Record: 1–8 (1–6 Ivy)
- Head coach: Len Jardine (6th season)
- Captains: Ken Cleplik; Bob Pangia
- Home stadium: Brown Stadium

1972 Ivy League football standings
	Conf.					Overall
Team	W		L		T	W		L		T
Dartmouth $	5	–	1	–	1	7	–	1	–	1
Yale	5	–	2	–	0	7	–	2	–	0
Penn	4	–	3	–	0	6	–	3	–	0
Cornell	4	–	3	–	0	6	–	3	–	0
Harvard	3	–	3	–	1	4	–	4	–	1
Princeton	2	–	4	–	1	3	–	5	–	1
Columbia	2	–	4	–	1	3	–	5	–	1
Brown	1	–	6	–	0	1	–	8	–	0
$ – Conference champion

The 1972 Brown Bears football team was an American football team that represented Brown University during the 1972 NCAA University Division football season. Brown finished last in the Ivy League.

In their sixth and final season under head coach Len Jardine, the Bears compiled a 1–8 record and were outscored 301 to 172. Ken Cleplik and Bob Pangia were the team captains.

The Bears' 1–6 conference record was the worst in the Ivy League standings. They were outscored by Ivy opponents 250 to 131.

Brown played its home games at Brown Stadium in Providence, Rhode Island.

== Schedule ==
Date	Opponent	Site	Result	Attendance	Source
September 23	Holy Cross*	Brown Stadium; Providence, RI	L 24–30	12,500	
September 30	Rhode Island*	Brown Stadium; Providence, RI (rivalry)	L 17–21	9,000	
October 7	Penn	Brown Stadium; Providence, RI	W 28–20	4,000	
October 14	at Yale	Yale Bowl; New Haven, CT	L 19–53	23,399	
October 21	at Dartmouth	Memorial Field; Hanover, NH	L 20–49	11,225	
November 4	Princeton^{†}	Brown Stadium; Providence, RI	L 10–31	10,850	
November 11	Cornell	Brown Stadium; Providence, RI	L 28–48	4,000	
November 18	at Harvard	Harvard Stadium; Boston, MA	L 14–21	10,000	
November 25	at Columbia	Baker Field; New York, NY	L 12–28	5,303	
*Non-conference game; ^{†}Homecoming
