= 1970 Harvard Crimson football team =

American college football season

1970 Harvard Crimson football
- Conference: Ivy League
- Record: 7–2 (5–2 Ivy)
- Head coach: John Yovicsin (14th season)
- Captain: Gary W. Farneti
- Home stadium: Harvard Stadium

1970 Ivy League football standings
	Conf.					Overall
Team	W		L		T	W		L		T
No. 14 Dartmouth $	7	–	0	–	0	9	–	0	–	0
Yale	5	–	2	–	0	7	–	2	–	0
Harvard	5	–	2	–	0	7	–	2	–	0
Cornell	4	–	3	–	0	6	–	3	–	0
Princeton	3	–	4	–	0	5	–	4	–	0
Penn	2	–	5	–	0	4	–	5	–	0
Columbia	1	–	6	–	0	3	–	6	–	0
Brown	1	–	6	–	0	2	–	7	–	0
$ – Conference champion; Rankings from AP Poll

The 1970 Harvard Crimson football team was an American football team that represented Harvard University during the 1970 NCAA University Division football season. Harvard tied for second in the Ivy League.

In their 14th and final year under head coach John Yovicsin, the Crimson compiled a 7–2 record and outscored opponents 227 to 157. Gary W. Farneti was the team captain.

Harvard's 5–2 conference record tied for second place in the Ivy League standings. The Crimson outscored Ivy opponents 160 to 141.

Harvard played its home games at Harvard Stadium in the Allston neighborhood of Boston, Massachusetts.

== Schedule ==
Date	Opponent	Site	Result	Attendance	Source
September 26	Northeastern*	Harvard Stadium; Boston, MA	W 28–7	15,000	
October 3	Rutgers*	Harvard Stadium; Boston, MA	W 39–9	12,000	
October 10	at Columbia	Baker Field; New York, NY	L 21–28	11,428	
October 17	Cornell	Harvard Stadium; Boston, MA	W 27–24	15,000	
October 24	Dartmouth	Harvard Stadium; Boston, MA (rivalry)	L 14–37	35,000	
October 31	Penn	Harvard Stadium; Boston, MA (rivalry)	W 38–23	12,000	
November 7	at Princeton	Palmer Stadium; Princeton, NJ (rivalry)	W 29–7	32,000	
November 14	Brown	Harvard Stadium; Boston, MA	W 17–10	10,500	
November 21	Yale	Harvard Stadium; Boston, MA (The Game)	W 14–12	40,000	
*Non-conference game
