= 1980 Princeton Tigers football team =

American college football season

1980 Princeton Tigers football
- Conference: Ivy League
- Record: 6–4 (4–3 Ivy)
- Head coach: Frank Navarro (3rd season)
- Captains: Mark W. Bailey; Paul R. Van Pelt
- Home stadium: Palmer Stadium

1980 Ivy League football standings
	Conf.					Overall
Team	W		L		T	W		L		T
Yale $	6	–	1	–	0	8	–	2	–	0
Cornell	5	–	2	–	0	5	–	5	–	0
Harvard	4	–	3	–	0	7	–	3	–	0
Brown	4	–	3	–	0	6	–	4	–	0
Princeton	4	–	3	–	0	6	–	4	–	0
Dartmouth	4	–	3	–	0	4	–	6	–	0
Penn	1	–	6	–	0	1	–	9	–	0
Columbia	0	–	7	–	0	1	–	9	–	0
$ – Conference champion

The 1980 Princeton Tigers football team was an American football team that represented Princeton University during the 1980 NCAA Division I-A football season. Princeton tied for third in the Ivy League.

In their third year under head coach Frank Navarro, the Tigers compiled a 6–4 record but were outscored 198 to 175. Mark W. Bailey and Paul R. Van Pelt were the team captains.

Princeton's 4–3 conference record tied for third place in the Ivy League standings. The Tigers were outscored 137 to 124 by Ivy opponents.

Ivy League football teams expanded their schedules to 10 games in 1980, making this the first year since 1953 that the Tigers played three games against non-Ivy opponents.

Princeton played its home games at Palmer Stadium on the university campus in Princeton, New Jersey.

== Schedule ==
Date	Opponent	Site	Result	Attendance	Source
September 20	at Cornell	Schoellkopf Field; Ithaca, NY	L 7–17	12,000	
September 27	at Rutgers*	Rutgers Stadium; Piscataway, NJ (rivalry)	L 13–44	26,219	
October 4	Brown	Palmer Stadium; Princeton, NJ	L 11–28	10,000	
October 11	at Columbia	Baker Field; New York, NY	W 31–19	6,875	
October 18	Colgate*	Palmer Stadium; Princeton, NJ	W 14–10	9,258	
October 25	Harvard	Palmer Stadium; Princeton, NJ (rivalry)	W 7–3	6,868	
November 1	Penn	Palmer Stadium; Princeton, NJ (rivalry)	W 28–21	12,025	
November 8	Maine*	Palmer Stadium; Princeton, NJ	W 24–7	7,210	
November 15	at Yale	Yale Bowl; New Haven, CT (rivalry)	L 13–25	36,000	
November 22	Dartmouth	Palmer Stadium; Princeton, NJ	W 27–24	15,500	
*Non-conference game

== Roster ==
1980 Princeton Tigers football team roster
Players
Coaches
Offense

Pos.	#	Name	Class
RB	20	Cris Crissy	Sr
WR	31	Dave Ginda	Jr
QB	9	Bob Holly	Jr
WR	22	Lew Leone	Sr
WR	87	Tom Michel	Jr
TE	18	Scott Oostdyk	Jr

Defense

Pos.	#	Name	Class
FS	47	Chris Fickett	Jr
FS	37	David Gutzke	Sr
DT	75	Steve Hart	Sr
DT	99	Jono Helmerich	Jr
DB	11	John Kistler	Sr
DT	60	Bob McNulty	Sr
DB	21	Henry Milligan	Sr
DE	92	Paul Van Pelt	Sr
DE	94	Joe Voigtsberger	Jr
DE	91	Rick Wise	Jr
LB	59	Scott Wright	Jr

Special teams

Pos.	#	Name	Class
P	2	Ken Buck	Sr

Head coach

- Frank Navarro

Coordinators/assistant coaches

Legend

- (C) Team captain
- (S) Suspended
- (I) Ineligible
- Injured
- Redshirt
