= 1980 Penn Quakers football team =

American college football season

1980 Penn Quakers football
- Conference: Ivy League
- Record: 1–9 (1–6 Ivy)
- Head coach: Harry Gamble (9th season)
- Home stadium: Franklin Field

1980 Ivy League football standings
| | Conf. | | | | | Overall |
| Team | W | | L | | T | W | | L | | T |
|---|---|---|---|---|---|---|---|---|---|---|
| Yale $ | 6 | – | 1 | – | 0 | 8 | – | 2 | – | 0 |
| Cornell | 5 | – | 2 | – | 0 | 5 | – | 5 | – | 0 |
| Harvard | 4 | – | 3 | – | 0 | 7 | – | 3 | – | 0 |
| Brown | 4 | – | 3 | – | 0 | 6 | – | 4 | – | 0 |
| Princeton | 4 | – | 3 | – | 0 | 6 | – | 4 | – | 0 |
| Dartmouth | 4 | – | 3 | – | 0 | 4 | – | 6 | – | 0 |
| Penn | 1 | – | 6 | – | 0 | 1 | – | 9 | – | 0 |
| Columbia | 0 | – | 7 | – | 0 | 1 | – | 9 | – | 0 |
$ – Conference champion

The 1980 Penn Quakers football team represented the University of Pennsylvania in the 1980 NCAA Division I-A football season.

== Schedule ==
| Date | Opponent | Site | Result | Attendance | Source |
|---|---|---|---|---|---|
| September 20 | at Dartmouth | Memorial Field; Hanover, NH | L 7–40 | 9,980 | |
| September 26 | Lehigh* | Franklin Field; Philadelphia, PA | L 6–35 | 14,864 | |
| October 4 | Columbia | Franklin Field; Philadelphia, PA | W 24–13 | 7,076 | |
| October 11 | at Brown | Brown Stadium; Providence, RI | L 22–42 | 4,500 | |
| October 18 | at Lafayette* | Fisher Field; Easton, PA | L 0–3 | 12,000 | |
| October 25 | Yale^{†} | Franklin Field; Philadelphia, PA | L 0–8 | 7,000 | |
| November 1 | at Princeton | Palmer Stadium; Princeton, NJ (rivalry) | L 21–28 | 12,025 | |
| November 8 | Villanova* | Franklin Field; Philadelphia, PA | L 3–34 | 15,454 | |
| November 15 | Harvard | Franklin Field; Philadelphia, PA (rivalry) | L 17–28 | 5,917 | |
| November 22 | at Cornell | Schoellkopf Field; Ithaca, NY (rivalry) | L 9–31 | 6,000 | |
*Non-conference game; ^{†}Homecoming

== Roster ==
1980 Penn Quakers football team roster
Players
Coaches
Offense

| Pos. | # | Name | Class |
|---|---|---|---|
| QB | 15 | Doug Marzonie |
| OT | 77 | Brian O’Neill |
| TE | 86 | Jerry Smith |

Defense

| Pos. | # | Name | Class |
|---|---|---|---|
| LB | 94 | Dan Prendergast |
| DB | 47 | Dave Pace |

Special teams

| Pos. | # | Name | Class |

Head coach

- Harry Gamble

Coordinators/assistant coaches

Legend

- (C) Team captain
- (S) Suspended
- (I) Ineligible
- Injured
- Redshirt
