= 1980 Yale Bulldogs football team =

American college football season

1980 Yale Bulldogs football

Ivy League champion
- Conference: Ivy League
- Record: 8–2 (6–1 Ivy)
- Head coach: Carmen Cozza (16th season)
- Home stadium: Yale Bowl

1980 Ivy League football standings
	Conf.					Overall
Team	W		L		T	W		L		T
Yale $	6	–	1	–	0	8	–	2	–	0
Cornell	5	–	2	–	0	5	–	5	–	0
Harvard	4	–	3	–	0	7	–	3	–	0
Brown	4	–	3	–	0	6	–	4	–	0
Princeton	4	–	3	–	0	6	–	4	–	0
Dartmouth	4	–	3	–	0	4	–	6	–	0
Penn	1	–	6	–	0	1	–	9	–	0
Columbia	0	–	7	–	0	1	–	9	–	0
$ – Conference champion

The 1980 Yale Bulldogs football team represented Yale University in the 1980 NCAA Division I-A football season. The Bulldogs were led by 16th-year head coach Carmen Cozza, played their home games at the Yale Bowl and finished in first place in the Ivy League with a 6–1 record, 8–2 overall.

== Schedule ==
Date	Opponent	Site	Result	Attendance	Source
September 20	at Brown	Brown Stadium; Providence, RI	W 45–17	15,500	
September 27	Connecticut*	Yale Bowl; New Haven, CT	W 20–10	34,500	
October 4	Air Force*	Yale Bowl; New Haven, CT	W 17–16	23,000	
October 11	at Boston College*	Alumni Stadium; Chestnut Hill, MA	L 9–27	26,000	
October 18	Columbia	Yale Bowl; New Haven, CT	W 30–10	14,000	
October 25	at Penn	Franklin Field; Philadelphia, PA	W 8–0	7,000	
November 1	at Dartmouth	Memorial Field; Hanover, NH	W 35–7	16,111	
November 8	Cornell	Yale Bowl; New Haven, CT	L 6–24	28,000	
November 15	Princeton	Yale Bowl; New Haven, CT (rivalry)	W 25–13	36,000	
November 22	at Harvard	Harvard Stadium; Boston, MA (The Game)	W 14–0	41,000	
*Non-conference game

== Roster ==
1980 Yale Bulldogs football team roster
Players
Coaches
Offense

Pos.	#	Name	Class
G	51	Bill Basa	So
FB	32	Jeff Bassette	So
G	67	Bill Bellissimo	Jr
TE	95	Dale Bernhard	Sr
OT	71	Jim Britt	Jr
WR	88	Bob Burkitt	Jr
QB	7	Rick Crews	So
RB	34	Jim Dalzell	So
G	62	Peter Deeb	Sr
RB	33	Rich Diana	Jr
TE	80	Matt Dolan	Jr
G	65	Bill Donahoe	Jr
QB	17	Joe Dufek	So
RB	44	Gerry Harrington	Sr
WR	82	Ron Jadin	So
TE	84	Tom Kokoska	Jr
C	55	Jim Lang	So
C	74	Paul Lata	Jr
QB	5	Phil Manley	Sr
C	52	Jeff Manning	Sr
RB	20	Cornell McCullom	Sr
WR	85	Tom Moyer	Jr
RB	41	John Nitti	Sr
QB	19	John Rogan	Jr
WR	86	Scott Sheldon	So
OT	70	Dan Skarzynski	Sr
WR	87	Dan Stratton	Sr
G	58	Bill Whitehurst	Sr

Defense

Pos.	#	Name	Class
LB	21	Danny Barnett	Sr
DB	14	Kerry Bensinger	Jr
DB	46	Greg Burkus	So
DB	9	Tom Burns	So
LB	45	Doug Carrns	Jr
DB	49	Pat Conran	Jr
MG	40	Kevin Czinger	Sr
CB	12	David Daugherty	Jr
DT	97	John Ford	Sr
DE	77	Doug Holowinko	So
LB	42	Jim Joiner	So
DE	99	John Kelly	Sr
DT	89	Bill Kirk	Jr
MG	66	Tony Lepore	Sr
DT	83	Bill Mattick	Sr
S	8	Mike Muscatello	Sr
LB	37	Scott McKenzie	Sr
DB	24	David Novosel	Sr
LB	23	Jeff Rohrer	Jr
LB	33	Jay Snyder	Jr
DE	36	Len Tavera	Sr
DE	78	Dennis Tulsiak	Jr
DB	10	George Vitelli	Jr
DB	18	Jon Wood	Jr

Special teams

Pos.	#	Name	Class
K	1	Jeff Arons	So
K	3	Tony Jones	Jr
K	11	Gary Whitman	Jr

Head coach

- Carmen Cozza

Coordinators/assistant coaches

Legend

- (C) Team captain
- (S) Suspended
- (I) Ineligible
- Injured
- Redshirt

== Team players in the NFL ==
No Yale players were selected in the 1981 NFL draft.

The following finished their college career in 1980, were not drafted, but played in the NFL.

Player	Position	First NFL team
John Nitti	Running back	New York Jets
