= 1972 Harvard Crimson football team =

American college football season

1972 Harvard Crimson football
- Conference: Ivy League
- Record: 4–4–1 (3–3–1 Ivy)
- Head coach: Joe Restic (2nd season)
- Captain: Theodore DeMars
- Home stadium: Harvard Stadium

1972 Ivy League football standings
	Conf.					Overall
Team	W		L		T	W		L		T
Dartmouth $	5	–	1	–	1	7	–	1	–	1
Yale	5	–	2	–	0	7	–	2	–	0
Penn	4	–	3	–	0	6	–	3	–	0
Cornell	4	–	3	–	0	6	–	3	–	0
Harvard	3	–	3	–	1	4	–	4	–	1
Princeton	2	–	4	–	1	3	–	5	–	1
Columbia	2	–	4	–	1	3	–	5	–	1
Brown	1	–	6	–	0	1	–	8	–	0
$ – Conference champion

The 1972 Harvard Crimson football team was an American football team that represented Harvard University during the 1972 NCAA University Division football season. Harvard finished fifth in the Ivy League.

In their second year under head coach Joe Restic, the Crimson compiled a 4–4–1 record and outscored opponents 198 to 186. Theodore DeMars was the team captain.

Harvard's 3–3–1 conference record placed fifth in the Ivy League standings. The Crimson outscored Ivy opponents 146 to 144.

Harvard played its home games at Harvard Stadium in the Allston neighborhood of Boston, Massachusetts.

== Schedule ==
Date	Opponent	Site	Result	Attendance	Source
September 30	UMass*	Harvard Stadium; Boston, MA	L 19–28	13,000–13,500	
October 7	Boston University*	Harvard Stadium; Boston, MA	W 33–14	5,000	
October 14	at Columbia	Baker Field; New York, NY	W 20–18	20,975	
October 21	Cornell	Harvard Stadium; Boston, MA	W 33–15	20,000	
October 28	Dartmouth	Harvard Stadium; Boston, MA (rivalry)	T 21–21	32,000	
November 4	Penn	Harvard Stadium; Boston, MA (rivalry)	L 27–38	9,000	
November 11	at Princeton	Palmer Stadium; Princeton, NJ (rivalry)	L 7–10	25,000	
November 18	Brown	Harvard Stadium; Boston, MA	W 21–14	10,000	
November 25	Yale	Harvard Stadium; Boston, MA (The Game)	L 17–28	39,000	
*Non-conference game
