= 1980 Brown Bears football team =

American college football season

1980 Brown Bears football
- Conference: Ivy League
- Record: 6–4 (4–3 Ivy)
- Head coach: John Anderson (8th season)
- Captains: Larry Carbone; John Woodring
- Home stadium: Brown Stadium

1980 Ivy League football standings
	Conf.					Overall
Team	W		L		T	W		L		T
Yale $	6	–	1	–	0	8	–	2	–	0
Cornell	5	–	2	–	0	5	–	5	–	0
Harvard	4	–	3	–	0	7	–	3	–	0
Brown	4	–	3	–	0	6	–	4	–	0
Princeton	4	–	3	–	0	6	–	4	–	0
Dartmouth	4	–	3	–	0	4	–	6	–	0
Penn	1	–	6	–	0	1	–	9	–	0
Columbia	0	–	7	–	0	1	–	9	–	0
$ – Conference champion

The 1980 Brown Bears football team was an American football team that represented Brown University during the 1980 NCAA Division I-A football season. Brown tied for third place in the Ivy League.

In their sixth season under head coach John Anderson, the Bears compiled a 6–4 record and outscored opponents 240 to 195. Larry Carbone and John Woodring were the team captains.

The Bears' 4–3 conference record earned them part of a four-way tie third place in the Ivy League standings. They outscored Ivy opponents 190 to 161.

Ivy League football teams expanded their schedules to 10 games in 1980, making this the first year since 1955 that Brown played three games against non-Ivy opponents.

Brown played its home games at Brown Stadium in Providence, Rhode Island.

== Schedule ==
Date	Opponent	Site	Result	Attendance	Source
September 20	Yale	Brown Stadium; Providence, RI	L 17–45	15,500	
September 27	Bucknell*	Brown Stadium; Providence, RI	L 20–28	7,000	
October 4	at Princeton	Palmer Stadium; Princeton, NJ	W 28–11	10,000	
October 11	Penn	Brown Stadium; Providence, RI	W 42–22	4,500	
October 18	at Cornell	Schoellkopf Field; Ithaca, NY	W 32–25	7,000	
October 25	Holy Cross*	Brown Stadium; Providence, RI	W 21–3	1,400	
November 1	at Harvard	Harvard Stadium; Boston, MA	L 16–17	16,000	
November 15	Dartmouth	Brown Stadium; Providence, RI	L 24–28	5,917	
November 22	at Columbia	Baker Field; New York, NY	W 31–13	5,125	
November 27	Rhode Island*	Brown Stadium; Providence, RI (rivalry)	W 9–3	7,200	
*Non-conference game

== Roster ==
1980 Brown Bears football team roster
Players			Coaches
Offense: Pos. / # / Name / Class; TE / 85 / Steve Jordan / Jr	Defense: Pos. / # / Name / Class; LB / 45 / John Woodring / Sr	Special teams: Pos. / # / Name / Class	Head coach: John Anderson; Coordinators/assistant coaches Legend: (C) Team captain; (S) Suspended; (I) Ineligible; Injured; Redshirt
