= Jake McCandless =

American football and basketball coach (c. 1930 – 2007)

Biographical details
- Born: c. 1930
- Died: November 5, 2007 (aged 77); Ocala, Florida, U.S.

Playing career

Football
- 1948–1950: Princeton

Coaching career (HC unless noted)

Football
- 1951–1953: St. Mark's School (MA)
- 1954–1957: Kent School (CT)
- 1958–1968: Princeton (assistant)
- 1969–1972: Princeton

Basketball
- 1951–1954: St. Mark's School (MA)
- 1954–1958: Kent School (CT)
- 1961–1962: Princeton

Head coaching record
- Overall: 18–17–1 (college football); 22–16 (college basketball)
- Tournaments: Basketball; 1–2 (NCAA)

Accomplishments and honors

Championships
- Football; 1 Ivy (1969); Basketball; 1 Ivy (1961)

Joey Leigh "Jake" McCandless (c. 1930 – November 5, 2007) was an American football and basketball coach. He served as the head football coach at Princeton University from 1969 to 1972, compiling a record of 18–17–1. McCandless also served as acting head basketball coach for the final 15 games of the 1960–61 season, replacing an ailing Franklin Cappon, who suffered a heart attack in January 1961. When Cappon died in November of that year, McCandless was named his successor and led the Princeton team for the 1961–62 season.

A native of Beaver Falls, Pennsylvania, McCandless graduated from Beaver Falls High School in 1947. He attended Princeton, where he played college football before graduating in 1951. He began his coaching career at St. Mark's School in Southborough, Massachusetts and Kent School in Kent, Connecticut. He returned to Princeton in 1958 as an assistant football coach. McCandless died at the age of 77, at his home in Ocala, Florida, on November 5, 2007.

== Head coaching record ==
=== College football ===
Year	Team	Overall	Conference	Standing	Bowl/playoffs
Princeton Tigers (Ivy League) (1969–1972)
1969	Princeton	6–3	6–1	T–1st	
1970	Princeton	5–4	3–4	5th	
1971	Princeton	4–5	3–4	T–5th	
1972	Princeton	3–5–1	2–4–1	T–6th	
Princeton:		18–17–1	14–13–1		
Total:		18–17–1			
National championship Conference title Conference division title or championship game berth

=== College basketball ===
Record table
Season	Team	Overall	Conference	Standing	Postseason
Princeton Tigers (Ivy League) (1960–1962)
1960–61	Princeton	9–6 (Note: Franklin Cappon served as head coach for the first 11 games of the season, leading Princeton to a 9–2 overall record and a 4–0 mark in the Ivy League. Princeton finished the season 18–8 overall and 11–3 in the Ivy.)	7–3	1st	NCAA University Division Regional Fourth Place
1961–62	Princeton	13–10	10–4	3rd	
Princeton:		22–16 (.579)	17–7 (.708)		
Total:		22–16 (.579)			
National champion Postseason invitational champion Conference regular season champion Conference regular season and conference tournament champion Division regular season champion Division regular season and conference tournament champion Conference tournament champion
