= 1970 Colgate Red Raiders football team =

American college football season

1970 Colgate Red Raiders football
- Conference: Independent
- Record: 5–6
- Head coach: Neil Wheelwright (3rd season)
- Captain: John Lennon
- Home stadium: Andy Kerr Stadium

1970 NCAA University Division independents football records
	Conf.			Overall
Team	W	L	T	W		L		T
No. 2 Notre Dame		–		10	–	1	–	0
Villanova		–		9	–	2	–	0
No. 16 Air Force		–		9	–	3	–	0
No. 13 Georgia Tech		–		9	–	3	–	0
Boston College		–		8	–	2	–	0
No. 19 Houston		–		8	–	3	–	0
West Virginia		–		8	–	3	–	0
No. 17 Tulane		–		8	–	4	–	0
No. 18 Penn State		–		7	–	3	–	0
West Texas State		–		7	–	3	–	0
Cincinnati		–		7	–	4	–	0
Florida State		–		7	–	4	–	0
Virginia Tech		–		5	–	6	–	0
Syracuse		–		6	–	4	–	0
Dayton		–		5	–	4	–	1
Pittsburgh		–		5	–	5	–	0
Rutgers		–		5	–	5	–	0
Utah State		–		5	–	5	–	0
Colgate		–		5	–	6	–	0
Southern Miss		–		5	–	6	–	0
New Mexico State		–		4	–	6	–	0
Miami (FL)		–		3	–	8	–	0
Northern Illinois		–		3	–	7	–	0
Marshall		–		3	–	6	–	0
Buffalo		–		2	–	9	–	0
Navy		–		2	–	9	–	0
Army		–		1	–	9	–	1
Xavier		–		1	–	9	–	0
Holy Cross		–		0	–	10	–	1
Rankings from AP Poll

The 1970 Colgate Red Raiders football team was an American football team that represented Colgate University as an independent during the 1970 NCAA University Division football season. In its third season under head coach Neil Wheelwright, the team compiled a 5–6 record. John Lennon was the team captain.

The team played its home games at Andy Kerr Stadium in Hamilton, New York.

== Schedule ==
Date	Time	Opponent	Site	Result	Attendance	Source
September 12	2:05 p.m.	at Navy	Navy–Marine Corps Memorial Stadium; Annapolis, MD	L 22–48	14,286	
September 19		at Boston University	Nickerson Field; Boston, MA	W 26–21	6,187–8,000	
September 26		Cornell	Andy Kerr Stadium; Hamilton, NY (rivalry)	L 7–17	10,500	
October 3		at Yale	Yale Bowl; New Haven, CT	L 7–39	23,166	
October 10		at Holy Cross	Fitton Field; Worcester, MA	W 21–13	10,111	
October 17		at Princeton	Palmer Stadium; Princeton, NJ	L 14–34	19,000	
October 24		at Brown	Brown Stadium; Providence, RI	W 10–6	8,400	
October 31		Lehigh	Andy Kerr Stadium; Hamilton, NY	W 21–12	4,600	
November 7		at Bucknell	Memorial Stadium; Lewisburg, PA	W 44–14	7,000	
November 14		at Virginia	Scott Stadium; Charlottesville, VA	L 12–54	13,300	
November 21		at Rutgers	Rutgers Stadium; Piscataway, NJ	L 14–30	11,500	
All times are in Eastern time

== Roster ==
1970 Colgate Red Raiders football team roster
Players
Coaches
Offense

Pos.	#	Name	Class
QB	11	Steve Goepel	Sr
OT	72	John O'Leary	Sr

Defense

Pos.	#	Name	Class

Special teams

Pos.	#	Name	Class

Head coach

- Neil Wheelwright

Coordinators/assistant coaches

Legend

- (C) Team captain
- (S) Suspended
- (I) Ineligible
- Injured
- Redshirt

== Leading players ==
Two trophies were awarded to the Red Raiders' most valuable players in 1970:

- Steve Goepel, quarterback, received the Andy Kerr Trophy, awarded to the most valuable offensive player.
- John Lennon, defensive tackle, received the Hal W. Lahar Trophy, awarded to the most valuable defensive player.

Statistical leaders for the 1970 Red Raiders included:

- Rushing: Steve Morgan, 610 yards and 7 touchdowns on 134 attempts
- Passing: Steve Goepel, 1,802 yards, 137 completions and 15 touchdowns on 309 attempts
- Receiving: Steve Fraser, 741 yards and 8 touchdowns on 44 receptions
- Total offense: Steve Goepel, 1,821 yards (1,802 passing, 19 rushing)
- Scoring: Steve Morgan, 48 points from 8 touchdowns
- All-purpose yards: Steve Fraser, 839 yards (741 receiving, 105 kickoff returning, 3 punt returning, minus-10 rushing)
