= 1973 Brown Bears football team =

American college football season

1973 Brown Bears football
- Conference: Ivy League
- Record: 4–3–1 (4–3 Ivy)
- Head coach: John Anderson (1st season)
- Captain: B. Ball
- Home stadium: Brown Stadium

1973 Ivy League football standings
	Conf.					Overall
Team	W		L		T	W		L		T
Dartmouth $	6	–	1	–	0	6	–	3	–	0
Harvard	5	–	2	–	0	7	–	2	–	0
Penn	5	–	2	–	0	6	–	3	–	0
Yale	5	–	2	–	0	6	–	3	–	0
Brown	4	–	3	–	0	4	–	3	–	1
Cornell	2	–	5	–	0	3	–	5	–	1
Columbia	1	–	6	–	0	1	–	7	–	1
Princeton	0	–	7	–	0	1	–	8	–	0
$ – Conference champion

The 1973 Brown Bears football team was an American football team that represented Brown University during the 1973 NCAA Division I football season. After seven years of last- or second-to-last-place finishes, Brown rose to fifth place in the Ivy League.

In their first season under head coach John Anderson, the Bears compiled a 4–3–1 record and outscored opponents 183 to 163. B. Ball was the team captain.

The Bears' 4–3 conference record placed fifth in the Ivy League standings, the team's best showing since 1964. They outscored Ivy opponents 163 to 143.

Brown played its home games at Brown Stadium in Providence, Rhode Island.

== Schedule ==
Date	Opponent	Site	Result	Attendance	Source
September 29	Rhode Island*	Brown Stadium; Providence, RI (rivalry)	T 20–20	10,000–10,200	
October 6	at Penn	Franklin Field; Philadelphia, PA	L 20–28	10,991	
October 13	at Yale	Yale Bowl; New Haven, CT	W 34–25	17,800	
October 20	Dartmouth^{†}	Brown Stadium; Providence, RI	L 16–28	10,056	
November 3	at Princeton	Palmer Stadium; Princeton, NJ	W 7–6	15,500	
November 10	at Cornell	Schoellkopf Field; Ithaca, NY	W 17–7	9,000	
November 17	Harvard^{†}	Brown Stadium; Providence, RI	L 32–35	15,792	
November 24	Columbia	Brown Stadium; Providence, RI	W 37–14	7,500	
*Non-conference game; ^{†}Homecoming
