= 1970 Columbia Lions football team =

American college football season

1970 Columbia Lions football
- Conference: Ivy League
- Record: 3–6 (1–6 Ivy)
- Head coach: Frank Navarro (3rd season)
- Home stadium: Baker Field

1970 Ivy League football standings
	Conf.					Overall
Team	W		L		T	W		L		T
No. 14 Dartmouth $	7	–	0	–	0	9	–	0	–	0
Yale	5	–	2	–	0	7	–	2	–	0
Harvard	5	–	2	–	0	7	–	2	–	0
Cornell	4	–	3	–	0	6	–	3	–	0
Princeton	3	–	4	–	0	5	–	4	–	0
Penn	2	–	5	–	0	4	–	5	–	0
Columbia	1	–	6	–	0	3	–	6	–	0
Brown	1	–	6	–	0	2	–	7	–	0
$ – Conference champion; Rankings from AP Poll

The 1970 Columbia Lions football team represented Columbia University in the 1970 NCAA University Division football season. They were led by third-year head coach Frank Navarro and played their home games at Baker Field . They were a member of the Ivy League. They finished the season 3–6 overall 1–6 in Ivy League play to tie for sixth place.

== Schedule ==
Date	Opponent	Site	Result	Attendance	Source
September 26	Lafayette*	Baker Field; New York, NY	W 23-9	5,079	
October 3	at Princeton	Palmer Stadium; Princeton, NJ	L 22-24	12,000	
October 10	Harvard	Baker Field; New York, NY	W 28-21	11,428	
October 17	at Yale	Yale Bowl; New Haven, CT	L 15-32	21,634	
October 24	Rutgers*	Baker Field; New York, NY	W 30-14	16,713	
October 31	Cornell	Baker Field; New York, NY	L 14-31	15,928	
November 7	at No. 17 Dartmouth	Memorial Field; Hanover, NH	L 0-55	12,850	
November 14	at Penn	Franklin Field; Philadelphia, PA	L 14-21	37,035	
November 21	Brown	Baker Field; New York, NY	L 12-17	9,035	
*Non-conference game; Rankings from AP Poll released prior to the game

== Roster ==
1970 Columbia Lions football team roster
Players
Coaches
Offense

Pos.	#	Name	Class
OT	70	Mike Alberts	So
WR	17	Jim Callanan	So
QB	12	Bill Flynn	Jr
QB	10	Don Jackson	So
C	59	Mike Pyszczymucha	Sr
WR	21	John Ryan	So
TE	91	George Starke	Sr

Defense

Pos.	#	Name	Class
DT	79	Herb Baker	So
LB	62	Dave Gallagher	Jr
DT	74	Ed Miller	Jr
DE	80	Bill Reed	Sr
DB	20	Dave Ryan	Sr

Special teams

Pos.	#	Name	Class

Head coach

- Frank Navarro

Coordinators/assistant coaches

Legend

- (C) Team captain
- (S) Suspended
- (I) Ineligible
- Injured
- Redshirt
