= 1970 Penn Quakers football team =

American college football season

1970 Penn Quakers football
- Conference: Ivy League
- Record: 4–5 (2–5 Ivy)
- Head coach: Bob Odell (6th season)
- Home stadium: Franklin Field

1970 Ivy League football standings
| | Conf. | | | | | Overall |
| Team | W | | L | | T | W | | L | | T |
|---|---|---|---|---|---|---|---|---|---|---|
| No. 14 Dartmouth $ | 7 | – | 0 | – | 0 | 9 | – | 0 | – | 0 |
| Yale | 5 | – | 2 | – | 0 | 7 | – | 2 | – | 0 |
| Harvard | 5 | – | 2 | – | 0 | 7 | – | 2 | – | 0 |
| Cornell | 4 | – | 3 | – | 0 | 6 | – | 3 | – | 0 |
| Princeton | 3 | – | 4 | – | 0 | 5 | – | 4 | – | 0 |
| Penn | 2 | – | 5 | – | 0 | 4 | – | 5 | – | 0 |
| Columbia | 1 | – | 6 | – | 0 | 3 | – | 6 | – | 0 |
| Brown | 1 | – | 6 | – | 0 | 2 | – | 7 | – | 0 |
$ – Conference champion; Rankings from AP Poll

The 1970 Penn Quakers football team represented the University of Pennsylvania as a member of the Ivy League during the 1970 NCAA University Division football season. Led by Bob Odell in his sixth and final season as head coach, the Quakers compiled an overall record of 4–5 with a mark of 2–5 in conference play, placing sixth in the Ivy League. Penn played home games at Franklin Field in Philadelphia.

== Schedule ==
| Date | Opponent | Site | Result | Attendance | Source |
|---|---|---|---|---|---|
| September 26 | Lehigh* | Franklin Field; Philadelphia, PA | W 24–0 | 10,400–10,406 | |
| October 3 | at Brown | Brown Stadium; Providence, RI | W 17–9 | 12,400 | |
| October 10 | at Cornell | Schoellkopf Field; Ithaca, NY (rivalry) | L 31–32 | 14,000 | |
| October 17 | Lafayette* | Franklin Field; Philadelphia, PA | W 31–20 | 7,913–7,933 | |
| October 24 | Princeton | Franklin Field; Philadelphia, PA (rivalry) | L 16–22 | 36,478 | |
| October 31 | at Harvard | Harvard Stadium; Boston, MA (rivalry) | L 23–28 | 12,000 | |
| November 7 | Yale | Franklin Field; Philadelphia, PA | L 22–32 | 30,104 | |
| November 14 | Columbia | Franklin Field; Philadelphia, PA | W 21–14 | 37,035 | |
| November 21 | No. 16 Dartmouth | Franklin Field; Philadelphia, PA | L 0–28 | 42,329 | |
*Non-conference game; Rankings from Coaches' Poll released prior to the game

== Roster ==
1970 Penn Quakers football team roster
| Players | | | Coaches |
|---|---|---|---|
| Offense: Pos. / # / Name / Class; OT / / Doug Karr / Sr | Defense: Pos. / # / Name / Class | Special teams: Pos. / # / Name / Class | Head coach: Harry Gamble; Coordinators/assistant coaches Legend: (C) Team captain; (S) Suspended; (I) Ineligible; Injured; Redshirt |
