= 1980 Cornell Big Red football team =

American college football season

1980 Cornell Big Red football
- Conference: Ivy League
- Record: 5–5 (5–2 Ivy)
- Head coach: Bob Blackman (4th season)
- Captains: Tom Rohlfing; Dan Scully
- Home stadium: Schoellkopf Field

1980 Ivy League football standings
| | Conf. | | | | | Overall |
| Team | W | | L | | T | W | | L | | T |
|---|---|---|---|---|---|---|---|---|---|---|
| Yale $ | 6 | – | 1 | – | 0 | 8 | – | 2 | – | 0 |
| Cornell | 5 | – | 2 | – | 0 | 5 | – | 5 | – | 0 |
| Harvard | 4 | – | 3 | – | 0 | 7 | – | 3 | – | 0 |
| Brown | 4 | – | 3 | – | 0 | 6 | – | 4 | – | 0 |
| Princeton | 4 | – | 3 | – | 0 | 6 | – | 4 | – | 0 |
| Dartmouth | 4 | – | 3 | – | 0 | 4 | – | 6 | – | 0 |
| Penn | 1 | – | 6 | – | 0 | 1 | – | 9 | – | 0 |
| Columbia | 0 | – | 7 | – | 0 | 1 | – | 9 | – | 0 |
$ – Conference champion

The 1980 Cornell Big Red football team was an American football team that represented Cornell University during the 1980 NCAA Division I-A football season. Cornell finished second in the Ivy League.

In its fourth season under head coach Bob Blackman, the team compiled a 5–5 record but was outscored 191 to 179. Team captains were Tom Rohlfing and Dan Scully.

Cornell's 5–2 conference record placed second in the Ivy League standings. The Big Red outscored Ivy opponents 144 to 77.

Ivy League football teams expanded their schedules to 10 games in 1980, making this the first year since 1954 that the Big Red played three games against non-Ivy opponents.

Cornell played its home games at Schoellkopf Field in Ithaca, New York.

== Schedule ==
| Date | Opponent | Site | Result | Attendance | Source |
|---|---|---|---|---|---|
| September 20 | Princeton | Schoellkopf Field; Ithaca, NY | W 17–7 | 12,000 | |
| September 27 | at Colgate* | Andy Kerr Stadium; Hamilton, NY (rivalry) | L 20–38 | 7,000 | |
| October 4 | Rutgers* | Schoellkopf Field; Ithaca, NY | L 3–44 | 11,500 | |
| October 11 | at Harvard | Harvard Stadium; Boston, MA | L 12–20 | 10,000 | |
| October 18 | Brown^{†} | Schoellkopf Field; Ithaca, NY | L 25–32 | 7,000 | |
| October 25 | Dartmouth | Schoellkopf Field; Ithaca, NY (rivalry) | W 7–3 | 4,500 | |
| November 1 | at Bucknell* | Memorial Stadium; Lewisburg, PA | L 16–33 | 2,500 | |
| November 8 | at Yale | Yale Bowl; New Haven, CT | W 24–6 | 28,000 | |
| November 15 | at Columbia | Baker Field; New York, NY (rivalry) | W 24–0 | 5,750 | |
| November 22 | Penn | Schoellkopf Field; Ithaca, NY (rivalry) | W 31–9 | 6,000 | |
*Non-conference game; ^{†}Homecoming

== Roster ==
1980 Cornell Big Red football team roster
Players
Coaches
Offense

| Pos. | # | Name | Class |
|---|---|---|---|
| QB | 10 | Chris Metz | Jr |
| QB | 11 | Mike Ryan | Sr |

Defense

| Pos. | # | Name | Class |
|---|---|---|---|
| DT | 99 | Dave Chalk | Sr |
| DT | 62 | John Bohenick |

Special teams

| Pos. | # | Name | Class |
|---|---|---|---|
| K | 4 | Ron Rejda | Sr |

Head coach

- Bob Blackman

Coordinators/assistant coaches

Legend

- (C) Team captain
- (S) Suspended
- (I) Ineligible
- Injured
- Redshirt

Roster
