= 1973 Penn Quakers football team =

American college football season

1973 Penn Quakers football
- Conference: Ivy League
- Record: 6–3 (5–2 Ivy)
- Head coach: Harry Gamble (3rd season)
- Defensive coordinator: Otto Kneidinger (3rd season)
- Captains: Jim Bumgardner; Glenn Casey
- Home stadium: Franklin Field

1973 Ivy League football standings
	Conf.					Overall
Team	W		L		T	W		L		T
Dartmouth $	6	–	1	–	0	6	–	3	–	0
Harvard	5	–	2	–	0	7	–	2	–	0
Penn	5	–	2	–	0	6	–	3	–	0
Yale	5	–	2	–	0	6	–	3	–	0
Brown	4	–	3	–	0	4	–	3	–	1
Cornell	2	–	5	–	0	3	–	5	–	1
Columbia	1	–	6	–	0	1	–	7	–	1
Princeton	0	–	7	–	0	1	–	8	–	0
$ – Conference champion

The 1973 Penn Quakers football team represented the University of Pennsylvania as a member of the Ivy League during the 1973 NCAA Division I football season. In their third year under head coach Harry Gamble, the Quakers compiled an overall record of 6–3 with a mark of 5–2 in conference play, placing in a three-way tie for second in the Ivy League. Jim Bumgardner and Glenn Casey were the team captains. Penn played home games at Franklin Field, adjacent to the university's campus in Philadelphia.

== Schedule ==
Date	Opponent	Site	Result	Attendance	Source
September 29	at Lafayette*	Fisher Stadium; Easton, PA	L 14–16	10,000	
October 6	Brown	Franklin Field; Philadelphia, PA	W 28–20	10,991	
October 13	at Dartmouth	Memorial Field; Hanover, NH	W 22–16	17,800	
October 19	Lehigh*	Franklin Field; Philadelphia, PA	W 27–20	15,500–17,800	
October 26	at Princeton	Palmer Stadium; Princeton, NJ (rivalry)	W 24–0	21,000	
November 3	Harvard	Franklin Field; Philadelphia, PA (rivalry)	L 30–34	37,167	
November 10	at Yale	Yale Bowl; New Haven, CT	L 21–24	23,458	
November 17	at Columbia	Baker Field; New York, NY	W 42–8	5,330	
November 24	Cornell	Franklin Field; Philadelphia, PA (rivalry)	W 31–22	24,559	
*Non-conference game
