= 1970 Princeton Tigers football team =

American college football season

1970 Princeton Tigers football
- Conference: Ivy League
- Record: 5–4 (3–4 Ivy)
- Head coach: Jake McCandless (2nd season)
- Captain: Dennis J. Burns
- Home stadium: Palmer Stadium

1970 Ivy League football standings
	Conf.					Overall
Team	W		L		T	W		L		T
No. 14 Dartmouth $	7	–	0	–	0	9	–	0	–	0
Yale	5	–	2	–	0	7	–	2	–	0
Harvard	5	–	2	–	0	7	–	2	–	0
Cornell	4	–	3	–	0	6	–	3	–	0
Princeton	3	–	4	–	0	5	–	4	–	0
Penn	2	–	5	–	0	4	–	5	–	0
Columbia	1	–	6	–	0	3	–	6	–	0
Brown	1	–	6	–	0	2	–	7	–	0
$ – Conference champion; Rankings from AP Poll

The 1970 Princeton Tigers football team was an American football team that represented Princeton University during the 1970 NCAA University Division football season. Princeton finished fifth in the Ivy League.

In their second year under head coach Jake McCandless, the Tigers compiled a 5–4 record and outscored opponents 196 to 180. Dennis J. Burns was the team captain.

Princeton's 3–4 conference record placed fifth in the Ivy League standings. The Tigers were outscored 175 to 130 by Ivy opponents.

Princeton played its home games at Palmer Stadium on the university campus in Princeton, New Jersey.

== Schedule ==
Date	Opponent	Site	Result	Attendance	Source
September 26	Rutgers*	Palmer Stadium; Princeton, NJ (rivalry)	W 41–14	32,000	
October 3	Columbia	Palmer Stadium; Princeton, NJ	W 24–22	12,000	
October 10	at Dartmouth	Memorial Field; Hanover, NH	L 0–38	20,306	
October 17	Colgate*	Palmer Stadium; Princeton, NJ	W 34–14	19,000	
October 24	at Penn	Franklin Field; Philadelphia, PA (rivalry)	W 22–16	36,478	
October 31	at Brown	Brown Stadium; Providence, RI	W 45–14	8,700	
November 7	Harvard	Palmer Stadium; Princeton, NJ (rivalry)	L 7–29	32,000	
November 14	at Yale	Yale Bowl; New Haven, CT (rivalry)	L 22–27	37,580	
November 21	Cornell	Palmer Stadium; Princeton, NJ	L 3–6	19,000	
*Non-conference game
