= 1980 Columbia Lions football team =

American college football season

1980 Columbia Lions football
- Conference: Ivy League
- Record: 1–9 (0–7 Ivy)
- Head coach: Bob Naso (1st season)
- Captains: Sean Cannon; Rico Josephs
- Home stadium: Baker Field

1980 Ivy League football standings
	Conf.					Overall
Team	W		L		T	W		L		T
Yale $	6	–	1	–	0	8	–	2	–	0
Cornell	5	–	2	–	0	5	–	5	–	0
Harvard	4	–	3	–	0	7	–	3	–	0
Brown	4	–	3	–	0	6	–	4	–	0
Princeton	4	–	3	–	0	6	–	4	–	0
Dartmouth	4	–	3	–	0	4	–	6	–	0
Penn	1	–	6	–	0	1	–	9	–	0
Columbia	0	–	7	–	0	1	–	9	–	0
$ – Conference champion

The 1980 Columbia Lions football team was an American football team that represented Columbia University during the 1980 NCAA Division I-A football season. Columbia finished last in the Ivy League.

In their first season under head coach Bob Naso, the Lions compiled a 1–9 record and were outscored 275 to 89. Sean Cannon and Rico Josephs were the team captains.

The Lions' winless (0–7) conference record was the worst in the Ivy League standings. Columbia was outscored 214 to 61 by Ivy opponents.

Ivy League football teams expanded their schedules to 10 games in 1980, making this the first year since 1955 that the Lions played three games against non-Ivy opponents.

Columbia played its home games at Baker Field in Upper Manhattan, in New York City.

== Schedule ==
Date	Opponent	Site	Result	Attendance	Source
September 20	at Harvard	Harvard Stadium; Boston, MA	L 6–26	10,000	
September 27	Lafayette*	Baker Field; New York, NY	W 6–0	4,500	
October 4	at Penn	Franklin Field; Philadelphia, PA	L 13–24	7,076	
October 11	Princeton^{†}	Baker Field; New York, NY	L 19–31	6,875	
October 18	at Yale	Yale Bowl; New Haven, CT	L 10–30	14,000	
October 25	at Colgate*	Andy Kerr Stadium; Hamilton, NY	L 22–35	1,000	
November 1	Holy Cross*	Baker Field; New York, NY	L 0–26	5,580	
November 8	at Dartmouth	Memorial Field; Hanover, NH	L 0–48	6,108	
November 15	Cornell	Baker Field; New York, NY (rivalry)	L 0–24	5,750	
November 22	Brown	Baker Field; New York, NY	L 13–31	5,125	
*Non-conference game; ^{†}Homecoming
