= 1973 Harvard Crimson football team =

American college football season

1973 Harvard Crimson football
- Conference: Ivy League
- Record: 7–2 (5–2 Ivy)
- Head coach: Joseph Restic (3rd season)
- Captain: David P. St. Pierre
- Home stadium: Harvard Stadium

1973 Ivy League football standings
	Conf.					Overall
Team	W		L		T	W		L		T
Dartmouth $	6	–	1	–	0	6	–	3	–	0
Harvard	5	–	2	–	0	7	–	2	–	0
Penn	5	–	2	–	0	6	–	3	–	0
Yale	5	–	2	–	0	6	–	3	–	0
Brown	4	–	3	–	0	4	–	3	–	1
Cornell	2	–	5	–	0	3	–	5	–	1
Columbia	1	–	6	–	0	1	–	7	–	1
Princeton	0	–	7	–	0	1	–	8	–	0
$ – Conference champion

The 1973 Harvard Crimson football team represented Harvard University in the 1973 NCAA Division I football season. They were led by third-year head coach Joseph Restic and played in the Ivy League.

== Schedule ==
Date	Opponent	Site	Result	Attendance	Source
September 29	UMass*	Harvard Stadium; Boston, MA	W 24–7	19,100–19,200	
October 6	Boston University*	Harvard Stadium; Boston, MA	W 16–0	13,000	
October 13	Columbia	Harvard Stadium; Boston, MA	W 57–0	25,500	
October 20	at Cornell	Schoellkopf Field; Ithaca, NY	W 21–15	20,000	
October 27	Dartmouth	Harvard Stadium; Boston, MA (rivalry)	L 18–24	31,000	
November 3	at Penn	Franklin Field; Philadelphia, PA (rivalry)	W 34–30	37,167	
November 10	Princeton	Harvard Stadium; Boston, MA (rivalry)	W 19–14	16,000	
November 17	at Brown	Brown Stadium; Providence, RI	W 35–32	15,792	
November 24	at Yale	Yale Bowl; New Haven, CT (The Game)	L 0–35	41,247	
*Non-conference game

== Roster ==
1973 Harvard Crimson football team roster
Players
Coaches
Offense

Pos.	#	Name	Class
QB	10	Jim Stoeckel	Sr
OT	75	Dan Jiggetts	So
WR	84	Pat McInally	Jr

Defense

Pos.	#	Name	Class
DE	80	Mitch Berger	Sr
DE	81	Joe Mackey	Sr
DE	82	Pete Mee	So
DE	83	Bill O'Neal	So

Special teams

Pos.	#	Name	Class

Head coach

- Joseph Restic

Coordinators/assistant coaches

Legend

- (C) Team captain
- (S) Suspended
- (I) Ineligible
- Injured
- Redshirt
