= 1970 Dartmouth Indians football team =

American college football season

1970 Dartmouth Indians football

Ivy League champion Eastern champion
- Conference: Ivy League

Ranking
- Coaches: No. 13
- AP: No. 14
- Record: 9–0 (7–0 Ivy)
- Head coach: Bob Blackman (16th season)
- Home stadium: Memorial Field

1970 Ivy League football standings
	Conf.					Overall
Team	W		L		T	W		L		T
No. 14 Dartmouth $	7	–	0	–	0	9	–	0	–	0
Yale	5	–	2	–	0	7	–	2	–	0
Harvard	5	–	2	–	0	7	–	2	–	0
Cornell	4	–	3	–	0	6	–	3	–	0
Princeton	3	–	4	–	0	5	–	4	–	0
Penn	2	–	5	–	0	4	–	5	–	0
Columbia	1	–	6	–	0	3	–	6	–	0
Brown	1	–	6	–	0	2	–	7	–	0
$ – Conference champion; Rankings from AP Poll

The 1970 Dartmouth Indians football team represented Dartmouth College during the 1970 NCAA University Division football season. The Indians were led by 16th-year head coach Bob Blackman and played their home games at Memorial Field in Hanover, New Hampshire. They finished with a perfect record of 9–0, winning the Ivy League title and the Lambert-Meadowlands Trophy, which signified them as champions of the East. Dartmouth finished ranked 14th in both major polls, their first ranked finish since 1943 and the last time an Ivy League school was ranked in the final AP Poll.

== Schedule ==
Date	Opponent	Rank	Site	Result	Attendance	Source
September 26	UMass*		Memorial Field; Hanover, NH	W 27–0	10,400	
October 3	at Holy Cross*		Fitton Field; Worcester, MA	W 50–14	13,222	
October 10	Princeton		Memorial Field; Hanover, NH	W 38–0	20,306	
October 17	Brown		Memorial Field; Hanover, NH	W 42–14	10,436	
October 24	at Harvard		Harvard Stadium; Boston, MA (rivalry)	W 37–14	35,000	
October 31	at Yale		Yale Bowl; New Haven, CT	W 10–0	60,820	
November 7	Columbia	No. 17	Memorial Field; Hanover, NH	W 55–0	12,850	
November 14	at Cornell	No. 15	Schoellkopf Field; Ithaca, NY (rivalry)	W 24–0	18,000	
November 21	at Penn	No. 16	Franklin Field; Philadelphia, PA	W 28–0	42,329	
*Non-conference game; Rankings from AP Poll released prior to the game

== Roster ==
1970 Dartmouth Indians football team roster
Players
Coaches
Offense

Pos.	#	Name	Class
WR	86	Gregg Brown	So
WR	80	Bob Brown	Sr
WR	81	Tyrone Byrd	So
QB	17	Jim Chasey	Sr
OT	73	Don Nelson	So

Defense

Pos.	#	Name	Class
S	43	Willie Bogan	Sr
LB	94	John Colangelo	Sr
DB	15	Mike Hannigan	Sr
LB	44	Ted Thompson	So

Special teams

Pos.	#	Name	Class
K	20	Jay Bennett	Sr

Head coach

- Bob Blackman

Coordinators/assistant coaches

- Frank Navarro

Legend

- (C) Team captain
- (S) Suspended
- (I) Ineligible
- Injured
- Redshirt
