= 1972 Cornell Big Red football team =

American college football season

1972 Cornell Big Red football
- Conference: Ivy League
- Record: 6–3 (4–3 Ivy)
- Head coach: Jack Musick (7th season)
- Captain: Bob Joehl
- Home stadium: Schoellkopf Field

1972 Ivy League football standings
	Conf.					Overall
Team	W		L		T	W		L		T
Dartmouth $	5	–	1	–	1	7	–	1	–	1
Yale	5	–	2	–	0	7	–	2	–	0
Penn	4	–	3	–	0	6	–	3	–	0
Cornell	4	–	3	–	0	6	–	3	–	0
Harvard	3	–	3	–	1	4	–	4	–	1
Princeton	2	–	4	–	1	3	–	5	–	1
Columbia	2	–	4	–	1	3	–	5	–	1
Brown	1	–	6	–	0	1	–	8	–	0
$ – Conference champion

The 1972 Cornell Big Red football team was an American football team that represented Cornell University during the 1972 NCAA University Division football season. A year after winning a share of the Ivy League title, Cornell dropped to a third-place tie.

In its seventh season under head coach Jack Musick, the team compiled a 6–3 record and outscored opponents 238 to 183. Bob Joehl was the team captain.

Cornell's 4–3 conference record tied for third-best in the Ivy League standings. The Big Red outscored Ivy opponents 155 to 154.

Cornell played its home games at Schoellkopf Field in Ithaca, New York.

== Schedule ==
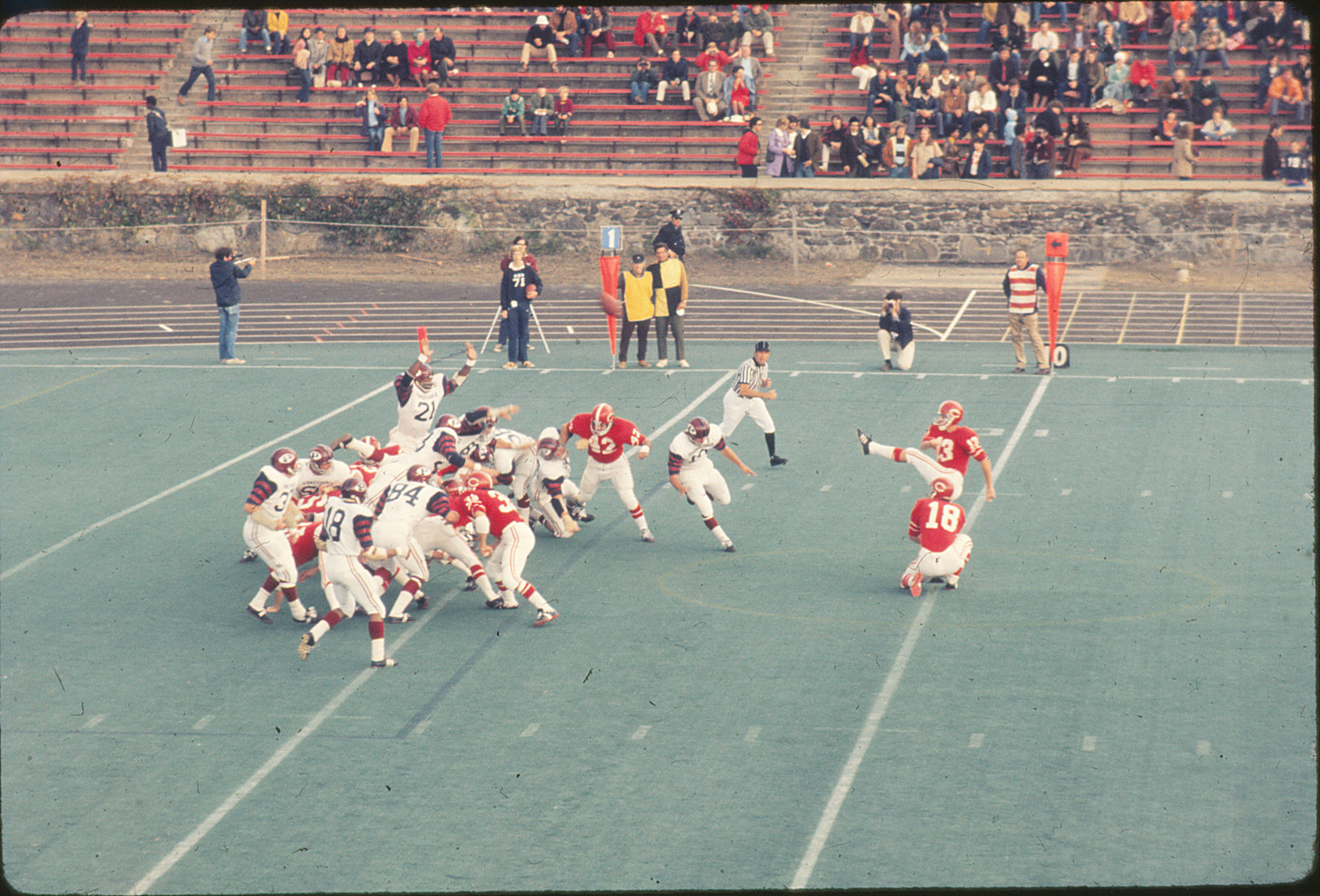
Cornell kicking an extra point against Penn

Date	Opponent	Site	Result	Attendance	Source
September 30	Colgate*	Schoellkopf Field; Ithaca, NY (rivalry)	W 37–7	15,000	
October 7	Rutgers*	Schoellkopf Field; Ithaca, NY	W 36–22	10,000	
October 14	Penn	Schoellkopf Field; Ithaca, NY (rivalry)	W 24–20	17,000	
October 21	at Harvard	Harvard Stadium; Boston, MA	L 15–33	20,000	
October 28	Yale	Schoellkopf Field; Ithaca, NY	W 24–13	21,000	
November 4	at Columbia	Baker Field; New York, NY (rivalry)	L 0–14	13,463	
November 11	at Brown	Brown Stadium; Providence, RI	W 48–28	4,000	
November 18	Dartmouth	Schoellkopf Field; Ithaca, NY (rivalry)	L 22–31	21,000	
November 25	at Princeton	Palmer Stadium; Princeton, NJ	W 22–15	16,000	
*Non-conference game
