= 1970 Cornell Big Red football team =

American college football season

1970 Cornell Big Red football
- Conference: Ivy League
- Record: 6–3 (4–3 Ivy)
- Head coach: Jack Musick (5th season)
- Captain: Dennis Lubozynski
- Home stadium: Schoellkopf Field

1970 Ivy League football standings
| | Conf. | | | | | Overall |
| Team | W | | L | | T | W | | L | | T |
|---|---|---|---|---|---|---|---|---|---|---|
| No. 14 Dartmouth $ | 7 | – | 0 | – | 0 | 9 | – | 0 | – | 0 |
| Yale | 5 | – | 2 | – | 0 | 7 | – | 2 | – | 0 |
| Harvard | 5 | – | 2 | – | 0 | 7 | – | 2 | – | 0 |
| Cornell | 4 | – | 3 | – | 0 | 6 | – | 3 | – | 0 |
| Princeton | 3 | – | 4 | – | 0 | 5 | – | 4 | – | 0 |
| Penn | 2 | – | 5 | – | 0 | 4 | – | 5 | – | 0 |
| Columbia | 1 | – | 6 | – | 0 | 3 | – | 6 | – | 0 |
| Brown | 1 | – | 6 | – | 0 | 2 | – | 7 | – | 0 |
$ – Conference champion; Rankings from AP Poll

The 1970 Cornell Big Red football team was an American football team that represented Cornell University during the 1970 NCAA University Division football season. Cornell finished fourth in the Ivy League.

In its fifth season under head coach Jack Musick, the team compiled a 6–3 record and outscored opponents 193 to 185. Dennis Lubozynski was the team captain.

Cornell's 4–3 conference record placed fourth in the Ivy League standings. The Big Red was outscored 164 to 135 by Ivy opponents.

Cornell played its home games at Schoellkopf Field in Ithaca, New York.

== Schedule ==
| Date | Opponent | Site | Result | Attendance | Source |
|---|---|---|---|---|---|
| September 26 | at Colgate* | Colgate Athletic Field; Hamilton, NY (rivalry) | W 17–7 | 10,500 | |
| October 3 | Lehigh* | Schoellkopf Field; Ithaca, NY | W 41–14 | 13,000 | |
| October 10 | Penn | Schoellkopf Field; Ithaca, NY (rivalry) | W 32–31 | 14,000 | |
| October 17 | at Harvard | Harvard Stadium; Boston, MA | L 24–27 | 15,000 | |
| October 24 | Yale | Schoellkopf Field; Ithaca, NY | L 7–38 | 17,000 | |
| October 31 | at Columbia | Baker Field; New York, NY (rivalry) | W 31–20 | 15,928 | |
| November 7 | at Brown | Brown Stadium; Providence, RI | W 35–21 | 7,500 | |
| November 14 | No. 15 Dartmouth | Schoellkopf Field; Ithaca, NY (rivalry) | L 0–24 | 18,000 | |
| November 21 | at Princeton | Palmer Stadium; Princeton, NJ | W 6–3 | 19,000 | |
*Non-conference game; Rankings from AP Poll released prior to the game

== Roster ==
1970 Cornell Big Red football team roster
Players
Coaches
Offense

| Pos. | # | Name | Class |
|---|---|---|---|
| QB | 10 | Barrett Rosser | So |
| RB | 44 | Ed Marinaro | Jr |
| WR | 81 | George Milosevic | So |

Defense

| Pos. | # | Name | Class |
|---|---|---|---|
| DE | 86 | William Ellis | Jr |

Special teams

| Pos. | # | Name | Class |
|---|---|---|---|
| K | 13 | John Killian | Jr |

Head coach

- Jack Musick

Coordinators/assistant coaches

Legend

- (C) Team captain
- (S) Suspended
- (I) Ineligible
- Injured
- Redshirt

Roster
