= 1972 Princeton Tigers football team =

American college football season

1972 Princeton Tigers football
- Conference: Ivy League
- Record: 3–5–1 (2–4–1 Ivy)
- Head coach: Jake McCandless (4th season)
- Captain: Michael L. Kincaid
- Home stadium: Palmer Stadium

1972 Ivy League football standings
	Conf.					Overall
Team	W		L		T	W		L		T
Dartmouth $	5	–	1	–	1	7	–	1	–	1
Yale	5	–	2	–	0	7	–	2	–	0
Penn	4	–	3	–	0	6	–	3	–	0
Cornell	4	–	3	–	0	6	–	3	–	0
Harvard	3	–	3	–	1	4	–	4	–	1
Princeton	2	–	4	–	1	3	–	5	–	1
Columbia	2	–	4	–	1	3	–	5	–	1
Brown	1	–	6	–	0	1	–	8	–	0
$ – Conference champion

The 1972 Princeton Tigers football team was an American football team that represented Princeton University during the 1972 NCAA University Division football season. Princeton finished sixth in the Ivy League.

In their fourth and final year under head coach Jake McCandless, the Tigers compiled a 3–5–1 record and were outscored 161 to 118. Michael L. Kincaid was the team captain.

Princeton's 2–4–1 conference record tied for sixth in the Ivy League standings. The Tigers were outscored 120 to 87 by Ivy opponents.

Princeton played its home games at Palmer Stadium on the university campus in Princeton, New Jersey.

== Schedule ==
Date	Opponent	Site	Result	Attendance	Source
September 30	Rutgers*	Palmer Stadium; Princeton, NJ (rivalry)	W 7–6	22,000	
October 7	Columbia	Palmer Stadium; Princeton, NJ	T 0–0	10,000	
October 14	at Dartmouth	Memorial Field; Hanover, NH	L 14–35	20,200	
October 21	Colgate*	Palmer Stadium; Princeton, NJ	L 26–35	16,000	
October 28	at Penn	Franklin Field; Philadelphia, PA (rivalry)	L 10–15	9,285	
November 4	at Brown	Brown Stadium; Providence, RI	W 31–10	10,850	
November 11	Harvard	Palmer Stadium; Princeton, NJ (rivalry)	W 10–7	25,000	
November 18	at Yale	Yale Bowl; New Haven, CT (rivalry)	L 7–31	31,032	
November 25	Cornell	Palmer Stadium; Princeton, NJ	L 15–22	16,000	
*Non-conference game
