= 1970 Yale Bulldogs football team =

American college football season

1970 Yale Bulldogs football
- Conference: Ivy League
- Record: 7–2 (5–2 Ivy)
- Head coach: Carmen Cozza (6th season)
- Home stadium: Yale Bowl

1970 Ivy League football standings
	Conf.					Overall
Team	W		L		T	W		L		T
No. 14 Dartmouth $	7	–	0	–	0	9	–	0	–	0
Yale	5	–	2	–	0	7	–	2	–	0
Harvard	5	–	2	–	0	7	–	2	–	0
Cornell	4	–	3	–	0	6	–	3	–	0
Princeton	3	–	4	–	0	5	–	4	–	0
Penn	2	–	5	–	0	4	–	5	–	0
Columbia	1	–	6	–	0	3	–	6	–	0
Brown	1	–	6	–	0	2	–	7	–	0
$ – Conference champion; Rankings from AP Poll

The 1970 Yale Bulldogs football team represented Yale University in the 1970 NCAA University Division football season. The Bulldogs were led by sixth-year head coach Carmen Cozza, played their home games at the Yale Bowl and finished tied for second place in the Ivy League with a 5–2 record, 7–2 overall.

== Schedule ==
Date	Opponent	Site	Result	Attendance	Source
September 26	Connecticut*	Yale Bowl; New Haven, CT	W 10–0	34,974	
October 3	Colgate*	Yale Bowl; New Haven, CT	W 39–7	23,166	
October 10	Brown	Yale Bowl; New Haven, CT	W 28–0	20,519	
October 17	Columbia	Yale Bowl; New Haven, CT	W 32–15	21,634	
October 24	at Cornell	Schoellkopf Field; Ithaca, NY	W 38–7	17,000	
October 31	Dartmouth	Yale Bowl; New Haven, CT	L 0–10	60,820	
November 7	at Penn	Franklin Field; Philadelphia, PA	W 32–22	30,104	
November 14	Princeton	Yale Bowl; New Haven, CT (rivalry)	W 27–22	37,580	
November 21	at Harvard	Harvard Stadium; Boston, MA (The Game)	L 12–14	40,000	
*Non-conference game

== Roster ==
1970 Yale Bulldogs football team roster
Players
Coaches
Offense

Pos.	#	Name	Class
RB	25	Dick Jauron	So
OT	75	Matt Jordan	Jr
QB	14	Joe Massey	Sr
FB	22	Greg Mierzwinski	So
QB	10	Roy Purrington	So

Defense

Pos.	#	Name	Class
DE	37	Sandy Cutler	So
LB	34	John Dancewicz	Sr
DE	84	Jim Gallagher	Sr
DE	80	Paul Jones	Jr
LB	40	Ron Kell	Sr
DT	62	John Klepic	So
DB	45	Don Martin	Sr
LB		Tom Neville

Special teams

Pos.	#	Name	Class

Head coach

- Carmen Cozza

Coordinators/assistant coaches

Legend

- (C) Team captain
- (S) Suspended
- (I) Ineligible
- Injured
- Redshirt

== NFL draft ==
The following Bulldogs were selected in the National Football League draft following the season.

Round	Pick	Player	Position	NFL team
7	157	Don Martin	DB	Oakland Raiders
13	338	Tom Neville	LB	Baltimore Colts
14	362	Jim Gallagher	LB	Minnesota Vikings
