= 1972 Dartmouth Indians football team =

American college football season

1972 Dartmouth Indians football

Ivy League champion
- Conference: Ivy League
- Record: 7–1–1 (5–1–1 Ivy)
- Head coach: Jake Crouthamel (2nd season)
- Captains: Robert Norton; Frederick Radke
- Home stadium: Memorial Field

1972 Ivy League football standings
	Conf.					Overall
Team	W		L		T	W		L		T
Dartmouth $	5	–	1	–	1	7	–	1	–	1
Yale	5	–	2	–	0	7	–	2	–	0
Penn	4	–	3	–	0	6	–	3	–	0
Cornell	4	–	3	–	0	6	–	3	–	0
Harvard	3	–	3	–	1	4	–	4	–	1
Princeton	2	–	4	–	1	3	–	5	–	1
Columbia	2	–	4	–	1	3	–	5	–	1
Brown	1	–	6	–	0	1	–	8	–	0
$ – Conference champion

The 1972 Dartmouth Indians football team was an American football team that represented Dartmouth College during the 1972 NCAA University Division football season. For the fourth straight year, the Indians were Ivy League champions.

In their second season under head coach Jake Crouthamel, the Indians compiled a 7–1–1 record and outscored opponents 260 to 168. Robert Norton and Frederick Radke were the team captains.

The Indians' 5–1–1 conference record was the best in the Ivy League standings, and unlike the previous year, when Dartmouth shared the Ivy League title, in 1972 the team won the league outright. The Indians outscored Ivy opponents 219 to 147.

Dartmouth played its home games at Memorial Field on the college campus in Hanover, New Hampshire.

== Schedule ==
Date	Opponent	Site	Result	Attendance	Source
September 30	New Hampshire*	Memorial Field; Hanover, NH (rivalry)	W 24–14	10,350	
October 7	at Holy Cross*	Fitton Field; Worcester, MA	W 17–7	8,000	
October 14	Princeton	Memorial Field; Hanover, NH	W 35–14	20,200	
October 21	Brown	Memorial Field; Hanover, NH	W 49–20	11,225	
October 28	at Harvard	Harvard Stadium; Boston, MA (rivalry)	T 21–21	32,000	
November 4	at Yale	Yale Bowl; New Haven, CT	L 14–45	41,507	
November 11	Columbia	Memorial Field; Hanover, NH	W 38–8	15,200	
November 18	at Cornell	Schoellkopf Field; Ithaca, NY (rivalry)	W 31–22	21,000	
November 25	at Penn	Franklin Field; Philadelphia, PA	W 31–17	42,422	
*Non-conference game
