= 1970 Brown Bears football team =

American college football season

1970 Brown Bears football
- Conference: Ivy League
- Record: 2–7 (1–6 Ivy)
- Head coach: Len Jardine (4th season)
- Captains: G. Hart; B. O’Donnell
- Home stadium: Brown Stadium

1970 Ivy League football standings
	Conf.					Overall
Team	W		L		T	W		L		T
No. 14 Dartmouth $	7	–	0	–	0	9	–	0	–	0
Yale	5	–	2	–	0	7	–	2	–	0
Harvard	5	–	2	–	0	7	–	2	–	0
Cornell	4	–	3	–	0	6	–	3	–	0
Princeton	3	–	4	–	0	5	–	4	–	0
Penn	2	–	5	–	0	4	–	5	–	0
Columbia	1	–	6	–	0	3	–	6	–	0
Brown	1	–	6	–	0	2	–	7	–	0
$ – Conference champion; Rankings from AP Poll

The 1970 Brown Bears football team was an American football team that represented Brown University during the 1970 NCAA University Division football season. Brown tied for last in the Ivy League.

In their fourth season under head coach Len Jardine, the Bears compiled a 2–7 record and were outscored 217 to 112. G. Hart and B. O’Donnell were the team captains.

The Bears' 1–6 conference record tied for seventh in the Ivy League standings. They were outscored by Ivy opponents 196 to 85.

Brown played its home games at Brown Stadium in Providence, Rhode Island.

== Schedule ==
Date	Opponent	Site	Result	Attendance	Source
September 26	Rhode Island*	Brown Stadium; Providence, RI (rivalry)	W 21–14	14,200–15,000	
October 3	Penn	Brown Stadium; Providence, RI	L 9–17	12,400	
October 10	at Yale	Yale Bowl; New Haven, CT	L 0–28	20,519	
October 17	at Dartmouth	Memorial Field; Hanover, NH	L 14–42	10,436	
October 24	Colgate*	Brown Stadium; Providence, RI	L 6–10	8,400	
October 31	Princeton	Brown Stadium; Providence, RI	L 14–42	8,700	
November 7	Cornell	Brown Stadium; Providence, RI	L 21–35	7,500	
November 14	at Harvard	Harvard Stadium; Boston, MA	L 10–17	10,500	
November 21	at Columbia	Baker Field; New York, NY	W 17–12	9,035	
*Non-conference game
