= Neil Wheelwright =

American football player and coach (1932–2023)

Biographical details
- Born: August 20, 1932; Danvers, Massachusetts, U.S.
- Died: May 3, 2023 (aged 90); Norwell, Massachusetts, U.S.

Playing career
- c. 1953: Springfield
- Position: Linebacker

Coaching career (HC unless noted)
- 1958–1961: Hofstra (assistant)
- 1962–1967: Colgate (backfield)
- 1968–1975: Colgate
- 1976–1980: Holy Cross

Head coaching record
- Overall: 61–72–2

Neil S. Wheelwright (August 20, 1932 – May 3, 2023) was an American college football coach. He served as the head football coach at Colgate University from 1968 to 1975 and at the College of the Holy Cross from 1976 to 1980, compiling a career head coaching record of 61–72–2. Wheelwright died on May 3, 2023 of cancer.

== Head coaching record ==
| Year | Team | Overall | Conference | Standing | Bowl/playoffs |
|---|---|---|---|---|---|
Colgate Red Raiders (NCAA University Division / Division I independent) (1968–1975)
| 1968 | Colgate | 5–5 | | | |
| 1969 | Colgate | 5–3–1 | | | |
| 1970 | Colgate | 5–6 | | | |
| 1971 | Colgate | 6–4 | | | |
| 1972 | Colgate | 5–4–1 | | | |
| 1973 | Colgate | 5–5 | | | |
| 1974 | Colgate | 4–6 | | | |
| 1975 | Colgate | 5–4 | | | |
| Colgate: | | 41–37–2 | | | |
Holy Cross Crusaders (NCAA Division I/I-A independent) (1976–1980)
| 1976 | Holy Cross | 3–8 | | | |
| 1977 | Holy Cross | 2–9 | | | |
| 1978 | Holy Cross | 7–4 | | | |
| 1979 | Holy Cross | 5–6 | | | |
| 1980 | Holy Cross | 3–8 | | | |
| Holy Cross: | | 20–35 | | | |
| Total: | | 61–72–2 | | | |
