= 1973 Dartmouth Indians football team =

American college football season

1973 Dartmouth Indians football

Ivy League champion
- Conference: Ivy League
- Record: 6–3 (6–1 Ivy)
- Head coach: Jake Crouthamel (3rd season)
- Captains: Thomas C. Csatari; Herbert Hopkins
- Home stadium: Memorial Field

1973 Ivy League football standings
| | Conf. | | | | | Overall |
| Team | W | | L | | T | W | | L | | T |
|---|---|---|---|---|---|---|---|---|---|---|
| Dartmouth $ | 6 | – | 1 | – | 0 | 6 | – | 3 | – | 0 |
| Harvard | 5 | – | 2 | – | 0 | 7 | – | 2 | – | 0 |
| Penn | 5 | – | 2 | – | 0 | 6 | – | 3 | – | 0 |
| Yale | 5 | – | 2 | – | 0 | 6 | – | 3 | – | 0 |
| Brown | 4 | – | 3 | – | 0 | 4 | – | 3 | – | 1 |
| Cornell | 2 | – | 5 | – | 0 | 3 | – | 5 | – | 1 |
| Columbia | 1 | – | 6 | – | 0 | 1 | – | 7 | – | 1 |
| Princeton | 0 | – | 7 | – | 0 | 1 | – | 8 | – | 0 |
$ – Conference champion

The 1973 Dartmouth Indians football team was an American football team that represented Dartmouth College during the 1973 NCAA Division I football season. Dartmouth was the outright Ivy League champion for the second straight year, and claimed a share of the title for a fifth straight year.

In their third season under head coach Jake Crouthamel, the Indians compiled a 6–3 record and outscored opponents 184 to 119. Thomas C. Csatari and Herbert Hopkins were the team captains.

The Indians' 6–1 conference record was the best in the Ivy League. Dartmouth outscored Ivy opponents 175 to 99.

This would be the last season for the "Dartmouth Indians" team name. In 1974, the college trustees ruled "use of the [Indian] symbol in any form to be inconsistent with present institutional and academic objectives of the college in advancing Native American education." That fall, all Dartmouth teams changed their name to "Big Green", which had long been used by the press as an alternative nickname for Dartmouth athletics teams.

Dartmouth played its home games at Memorial Field on the college campus in Hanover, New Hampshire.

== Schedule ==
| Date | Opponent | Site | Result | Attendance | Source |
|---|---|---|---|---|---|
| September 29 | at New Hampshire* | Cowell Stadium; Durham, NH (rivalry) | L 9–10 | 11,273–11,733 | |
| October 6 | Holy Cross* | Memorial Field; Hanover, NH | L 0–10 | 15,700 | |
| October 13 | Penn | Memorial Field; Hanover, NH | L 16–22 | 17,800 | |
| October 20 | at Brown | Brown Stadium; Providence, RI | W 28–16 | 10,056 | |
| October 27 | at Harvard | Harvard Stadium; Boston, MA (rivalry) | W 24–18 | 31,000 | |
| November 3 | Yale | Memorial Field; Hanover, NH | W 24–13 | 19,000 | |
| November 10 | at Columbia | Baker Field; New York, NY | W 24–6 | 6,100 | |
| November 17 | Cornell | Memorial Field; Hanover, NH (rivalry) | W 17–0 | 15,300 | |
| November 24 | at Princeton | Palmer Stadium; Princeton, NJ | W 42–24 | 17,000 | |
*Non-conference game
