= 1973 Cornell Big Red football team =

American college football season

1973 Cornell Big Red football
- Conference: Ivy League
- Record: 3–5–1 (2–5 Ivy)
- Head coach: Jack Musick (8th season)
- Captain: Bob Lally
- Home stadium: Schoellkopf Field

1973 Ivy League football standings
	Conf.					Overall
Team	W		L		T	W		L		T
Dartmouth $	6	–	1	–	0	6	–	3	–	0
Harvard	5	–	2	–	0	7	–	2	–	0
Penn	5	–	2	–	0	6	–	3	–	0
Yale	5	–	2	–	0	6	–	3	–	0
Brown	4	–	3	–	0	4	–	3	–	1
Cornell	2	–	5	–	0	3	–	5	–	1
Columbia	1	–	6	–	0	1	–	7	–	1
Princeton	0	–	7	–	0	1	–	8	–	0
$ – Conference champion

The 1973 Cornell Big Red football team was an American football team that represented Cornell University during the 1973 NCAA Division I football season. Cornell finished sixth in the Ivy League.

In its eighth season under head coach Jack Musick, the team compiled a 3–5–1 record but outscored opponents 170 to 154. Bob Lally was the team captain.

Cornell's 2–5 conference record placed sixth in the Ivy League standings. The Big Red outscored Ivy opponents 128 to 126.

Cornell played its home games at Schoellkopf Field in Ithaca, New York.

== Schedule ==
Date	Opponent	Site	Result	Attendance	Source
September 29	at Colgate*	Colgate Athletic Field; Hamilton, NY (rivalry)	W 35–21	10,500	
October 6	Lehigh*	Schoellkopf Field; Ithaca, NY	T 7–7	14,000	
October 13	Princeton	Schoellkopf Field; Ithaca, NY	W 37–6	21,000	
October 20	Harvard	Schoellkopf Field; Ithaca, NY	L 15–21	20,000	
October 27	at Yale	Yale Bowl; New Haven, CT	L 3–20	22,585	
November 3	Columbia	Schoellkopf Field; Ithaca, NY (rivalry)	W 44–14	13,000	
November 10	Brown	Schoellkopf Field; Ithaca, NY	L 7–17	9,000	
November 17	at Dartmouth	Memorial Field; Hanover, NH (rivalry)	L 0–17	15,300	
November 24	at Penn	Franklin Field; Philadelphia, PA (rivalry)	L 22–31	24,559	
*Non-conference game
