= 1973 Columbia Lions football team =

American college football season

1973 Columbia Lions football
- Conference: Ivy League
- Record: 1–7–1 (1–6 Ivy)
- Head coach: Frank Navarro (6th season)
- Captains: Mike Evans; Ted Gregory
- Home stadium: Baker Field

1973 Ivy League football standings
	Conf.					Overall
Team	W		L		T	W		L		T
Dartmouth $	6	–	1	–	0	6	–	3	–	0
Harvard	5	–	2	–	0	7	–	2	–	0
Penn	5	–	2	–	0	6	–	3	–	0
Yale	5	–	2	–	0	6	–	3	–	0
Brown	4	–	3	–	0	4	–	3	–	1
Cornell	2	–	5	–	0	3	–	5	–	1
Columbia	1	–	6	–	0	1	–	7	–	1
Princeton	0	–	7	–	0	1	–	8	–	0
$ – Conference champion

The 1973 Columbia Lions football team was an American football team that represented Columbia University during the 1973 NCAA Division I football season. Columbia finished second-to-last in the Ivy League.

In their sixth and final season under head coach Frank Navarro, the Lions compiled a 1–7–1 record and were outscored 274 to 58. Mike Evans and Ted Gregory were the team captains.

The Lions' 1–6 conference record placed seventh in the Ivy League standings. Columbia was outscored 246 to 56 by Ivy opponents.

Columbia played its home games at Baker Field in Upper Manhattan, in New York City.

== Schedule ==
Date	Opponent	Site	Result	Attendance	Source
September 29	Bucknell*	Baker Field; New York, NY	T 0–0	4,837	
October 6	Princeton	Baker Field; New York, NY	W 14–13	12,166	
October 13	at Harvard	Harvard Stadium; Boston, MA	L 0–57	25,500	
October 20	Yale^{†}	Baker Field; New York, NY	L 0–29	14,886	
October 27	at Rutgers*	Rutgers Stadium; Piscataway, NJ	L 2–28	16,500	
November 3	at Cornell	Schoellkopf Field; Ithaca, NY (rivalry)	L 14–44	13,000	
November 10	Dartmouth	Baker Field; New York, NY	L 6–24	6,100	
November 17	Penn	Baker Field; New York, NY	L 8–42	5,330	
November 24	at Brown	Brown Stadium; Providence, RI	L 14–37	7,500	
*Non-conference game; ^{†}Homecoming

== Roster ==
1973 Columbia Lions football team roster
Players			Coaches
Offense: Pos. / # / Name / Class; QB / 10 / Mike Delaney / So	Defense: Pos. / # / Name / Class; DB / 12 / Geoff Cummings / Jr	Special teams: Pos. / # / Name / Class	Head coach: Frank Navarro; Coordinators/assistant coaches Legend: (C) Team captain; (S) Suspended; (I) Ineligible; Injured; Redshirt
