= 1980 Holy Cross Crusaders football team =

American college football season

1980 Holy Cross Crusaders football
- Conference: Independent
- Record: 3–8
- Head coach: Neil Wheelwright (5th season)
- Captains: John Ahern; Bob Ireland
- Home stadium: Fitton Field

1980 NCAA Division I-A independents football records
	Conf.					Overall
Team	W		L		T	W		L		T
No. 2 Pittsburgh		–		–		11	–	1	–	0
Tennessee State		–		–		9	–	1	–	0
No. 5 Florida State		–		–		10	–	2	–	0
No. 8 Penn State		–		–		10	–	2	–	0
No. 9 Notre Dame		–		–		9	–	2	–	1
No. 18 Miami (FL)		–		–		9	–	3	–	0
Southern Miss		–		–		9	–	3	–	0
Navy		–		–		8	–	4	–	0
South Carolina		–		–		8	–	4	–	0
Virginia Tech		–		–		8	–	4	–	0
Boston College		–		–		7	–	4	–	0
Northeast Louisiana		–		–		7	–	4	–	0
Rutgers		–		–		7	–	4	–	0
UNLV		–		–		7	–	4	–	0
Tulane		–		–		7	–	5	–	0
Colgate		–		–		5	–	4	–	1
North Texas State		–		–		6	–	5	–	0
Villanova		–		–		6	–	5	–	0
West Virginia		–		–		6	–	6	–	0
Louisville		–		–		5	–	6	–	0
Richmond		–		–		5	–	6	–	0
Syracuse		–		–		5	–	6	–	0
East Carolina		–		–		4	–	7	–	0
Illinois State		–		–		4	–	7	–	0
Temple		–		–		4	–	7	–	0
Army		–		–		3	–	7	–	1
Holy Cross		–		–		3	–	8	–	0
Cincinnati		–		–		2	–	9	–	0
Memphis State		–		–		2	–	9	–	0
William & Mary		–		–		2	–	9	–	0
Georgia Tech		–		–		1	–	9	–	1
Rankings from AP Poll

The 1980 Holy Cross Crusaders football team was an American football team that represented the College of the Holy Cross as an independent during the 1980 NCAA Division I-A football season. Neil Wheelwright returned for his fifth year as head coach. The team compiled a record of 3–8.

All home games were played at Fitton Field on the Holy Cross campus in Worcester, Massachusetts.

== Schedule ==
Date	Opponent	Site	Result	Attendance	Source
September 6	Rhode Island	Fitton Field; Worcester, MA	W 21–14	11,121	
September 13	at Army	Michie Stadium; West Point, NY	L 7–28	28,043	
September 27	at Harvard	Harvard Stadium; Boston, MA	L 13–14	18,000	
October 4	Dartmouth^{†}	Fitton Field; Worcester, MA	W 17–6	15,783	
October 11	at Colgate	Andy Kerr Stadium; Hamilton, NY	L 7–38	5,000	
October 18	Connecticut^	Fitton Field; Worcester, MA	L 17–18	6,000	
October 25	at Brown	Brown Stadium; Providence, RI	L 3–21	1,400	
November 1	at Columbia	Baker Field; New York, NY	W 26–0	5,580	
November 8	No. T–10 UMass	Fitton Field; Worcester, MA	L 13–17	7,121	
November 15	Villanova	Fitton Field; Worcester, MA	L 13–45	5,135	
November 29	at Boston College	Alumni Stadium; Chestnut Hill, MA (rivalry)	L 26–27	27,400	
^{†}Homecoming; ^ Family Weekend

== Statistical leaders ==
Statistical leaders for the 1980 Crusaders included:

- Rushing: Mark Covington, 516 yards and 4 touchdowns on 152 attempts
- Passing: Dave Boisture, 1,659 yards, 113 completions and 6 touchdowns on 262 attempts
- Receiving: Brian Kelley, 639 yards and 2 touchdowns on 48 receptions
- Scoring: Matt Michaud, 26 points from 14 PATs and 4 field goals
- Total offense: Dave Boisture, 1,610 yards (1,659 passing, minus-49 rushing)
- All-purpose yards: John Ahern, 813 yards (566 receiving, 198 returning, 49 rushing)
- Interceptions: Peter George, Eric Oden and Rob Porter, 2 interceptions each (yardage: George, 23; Oden, 15; Porter, 6)
- Tackles: Jim Cobb, 127 total tackles (62 solo, 65 assist)
