= 1973 Princeton Tigers football team =

American college football season

1973 Princeton Tigers football
- Conference: Ivy League
- Record: 1–8 (0–7 Ivy League)
- Head coach: Robert Casciola (1st season)
- Captain: William G. Cronin
- Home stadium: Palmer Stadium

1973 Ivy League football standings
	Conf.					Overall
Team	W		L		T	W		L		T
Dartmouth $	6	–	1	–	0	6	–	3	–	0
Harvard	5	–	2	–	0	7	–	2	–	0
Penn	5	–	2	–	0	6	–	3	–	0
Yale	5	–	2	–	0	6	–	3	–	0
Brown	4	–	3	–	0	4	–	3	–	1
Cornell	2	–	5	–	0	3	–	5	–	1
Columbia	1	–	6	–	0	1	–	7	–	1
Princeton	0	–	7	–	0	1	–	8	–	0
$ – Conference champion

The 1973 Princeton Tigers football team was an American football team that represented Princeton University during the 1973 NCAA Division I football season. Princeton finished last in the Ivy League.

In their first year under head coach Robert Casciola, the Tigers compiled a 1–8 record and was outscored 233 to 127. William G. Cronin was the team captain.

Princeton's winless (0–7) conference record placed last in the Ivy League standings. The Tigers were outscored 173 to 76 by Ivy opponents.

Princeton played its home games at Palmer Stadium on the university campus in Princeton, New Jersey.

== Schedule ==
Date	Opponent	Site	Result	Attendance	Source
September 29	Rutgers*	Palmer Stadium; Princeton, NJ (rivalry)	L 14–39	27,000	
October 6	at Columbia	Baker Field; New York, NY	L 13–14	12,166	
October 13	at Cornell	Schoellkopf Field; Ithaca, NY	L 6–37	21,000	
October 20	Colgate*	Palmer Stadium; Princeton, NJ	W 37–21	15,500	
October 27	Penn	Palmer Stadium; Princeton, NJ (rivalry)	L 0–24	21,000	
November 3	Brown	Palmer Stadium; Princeton, NJ	L 6–7	15,500	
November 10	at Harvard	Harvard Stadium; Boston, MA (rivalry)	L 14–19	16,000	
November 17	Yale	Palmer Stadium; Princeton, NJ (rivalry)	L 13–30	31,000	
November 24	Dartmouth	Palmer Stadium; Princeton, NJ	L 24–42	17,000	
*Non-conference game

== Roster ==
1973 Princeton Tigers football team roster
Players
Coaches
Offense

Pos.	#	Name	Class
OT	77	Karl Chandler	Sr
QB	15	James Flynn	Sr

Defense

Pos.	#	Name	Class

Special teams

Pos.	#	Name	Class

Head coach

- Robert Casciola

Coordinators/assistant coaches

Legend

- (C) Team captain
- (S) Suspended
- (I) Ineligible
- Injured
- Redshirt
