= 1980 Harvard Crimson football team =

American college football season

1980 Harvard Crimson football
- Conference: Ivy League
- Record: 7–3 (4–3 Ivy)
- Head coach: Joe Restic (10th season)
- Captain: Charles F. Durst
- Home stadium: Harvard Stadium

1980 Ivy League football standings
	Conf.					Overall
Team	W		L		T	W		L		T
Yale $	6	–	1	–	0	8	–	2	–	0
Cornell	5	–	2	–	0	5	–	5	–	0
Harvard	4	–	3	–	0	7	–	3	–	0
Brown	4	–	3	–	0	6	–	4	–	0
Princeton	4	–	3	–	0	6	–	4	–	0
Dartmouth	4	–	3	–	0	4	–	6	–	0
Penn	1	–	6	–	0	1	–	9	–	0
Columbia	0	–	7	–	0	1	–	9	–	0
$ – Conference champion

The 1980 Harvard Crimson football team was an American football team that represented Harvard University during the 1980 NCAA Division I-A football season. Harvard tied for third place in the Ivy League.

In their tenth year under head coach Joe Restic, the Crimson compiled a 7–3 record and outscored opponents 159 to 138. Charles F. Durst was the team captain.

Harvard's 4–3 conference record tied for third in the Ivy League standings. The Crimson were evenly matched by Ivy opponents, with 106 points scored and 106 points against.

Ivy League football teams expanded their schedules to 10 games in 1980, making this the first year since 1953 that the Crimson played three games against non-Ivy opponents.

Harvard played its home games at Harvard Stadium in the Allston neighborhood of Boston, Massachusetts.

== Schedule ==
Date	Opponent	Site	Result	Attendance	Source
September 20	Columbia	Harvard Stadium; Boston, MA	W 26–6	10,000	
September 27	Holy Cross*	Harvard Stadium; Boston, MA	W 14–13	18,000	
October 4	at Army*	Michie Stadium; West Point, NY	W 15–10	38,479	
October 11	Cornell	Harvard Stadium; Boston, MA	W 20–12	10,000	
October 18	at Dartmouth	Memorial Field; Hanover, NH (rivalry)	L 12–30	20,000	
October 25	at Princeton	Palmer Stadium; Princeton, NJ (rivalry)	L 3–7	6,868	
November 1	Brown	Harvard Stadium; Boston, MA	W 17–16	16,000	
November 8	William & Mary*	Harvard Stadium; Boston, MA	W 24–13	10,000	
November 15	at Penn	Franklin Field; Philadelphia, PA	W 28–17	5,917	
November 22	Yale	Harvard Stadium; Boston, MA (The Game)	L 0–14	41,000	
*Non-conference game
