= 1972 Penn Quakers football team =

American college football season

1972 Penn Quakers football
- Conference: Ivy League
- Record: 6–3 (4–3 Ivy)
- Head coach: Harry Gamble (2nd season)
- Defensive coordinator: Otto Kneidinger (2nd season)
- Captains: Phil Adams; Joe Italiano
- Home stadium: Franklin Field

1972 Ivy League football standings
	Conf.					Overall
Team	W		L		T	W		L		T
Dartmouth $	5	–	1	–	1	7	–	1	–	1
Yale	5	–	2	–	0	7	–	2	–	0
Penn	4	–	3	–	0	6	–	3	–	0
Cornell	4	–	3	–	0	6	–	3	–	0
Harvard	3	–	3	–	1	4	–	4	–	1
Princeton	2	–	4	–	1	3	–	5	–	1
Columbia	2	–	4	–	1	3	–	5	–	1
Brown	1	–	6	–	0	1	–	8	–	0
$ – Conference champion

The 1972 Penn Quakers football team represented the University of Pennsylvania as a member of the Ivy League during the 1972 NCAA University Division football season. In their second year under head coach Harry Gamble, the Quakers compiled an overall record of 6–3 with a mark of 4–3 in conference play, tying for third place in the Ivy League. Jim Bumgardner and Joe Italiano were the team captains. Penn played home games at Franklin Field, adjacent to the university's campus in Philadelphia.

== Schedule ==
Date	Opponent	Site	Result	Attendance	Source
September 29	Lafayette*	Franklin Field; Philadelphia, PA	W 55–12	15,684	
October 7	at Brown	Brown Stadium; Providence, RI	L 20–28	4,000	
October 14	at Cornell	Schoellkopf Field; Ithaca, NY (rivalry)	L 20–24	17,000	
October 21	at Lehigh*	Taylor Stadium; Bethlehem, PA	W 30-27	14,000	
October 28	Princeton	Franklin Field; Philadelphia, PA (rivalry)	W 15–10	9,285	
November 4	at Harvard	Harvard Stadium; Boston, MA (rivalry)	W 38–27	9,000	
November 11	Yale	Franklin Field; Philadelphia, PA	W 48–30	21,380	
November 18	Columbia	Franklin Field; Philadelphia, PA	W 20–14	27,803	
November 25	Dartmouth	Franklin Field; Philadelphia, PA	L 17–31	42,422	
*Non-conference game

== Roster ==
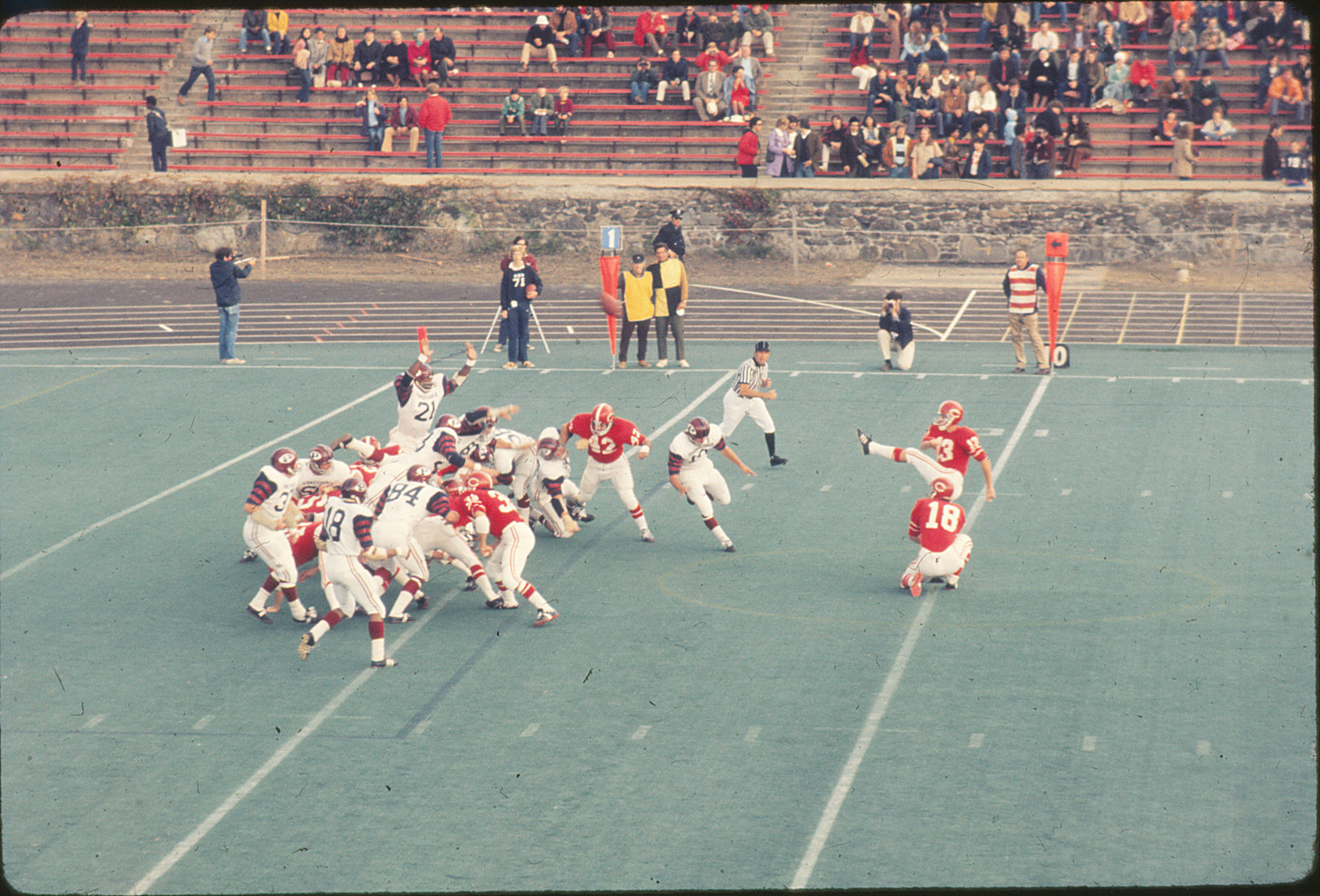
1972 Cornell–Penn game at Schoellkopf Field

1972 Penn Quakers football team roster
Players			Coaches
Offense: Pos. / # / Name / Class; WR / 82 / Don Clune / Jr	Defense: Pos. / # / Name / Class	Special teams: Pos. / # / Name / Class	Head coach: Harry Gamble; Coordinators/assistant coaches Legend: (C) Team captain; (S) Suspended; (I) Ineligible; Injured; Redshirt
