= Bob Blackman (American football) =

American football player and coach (1918–2000)

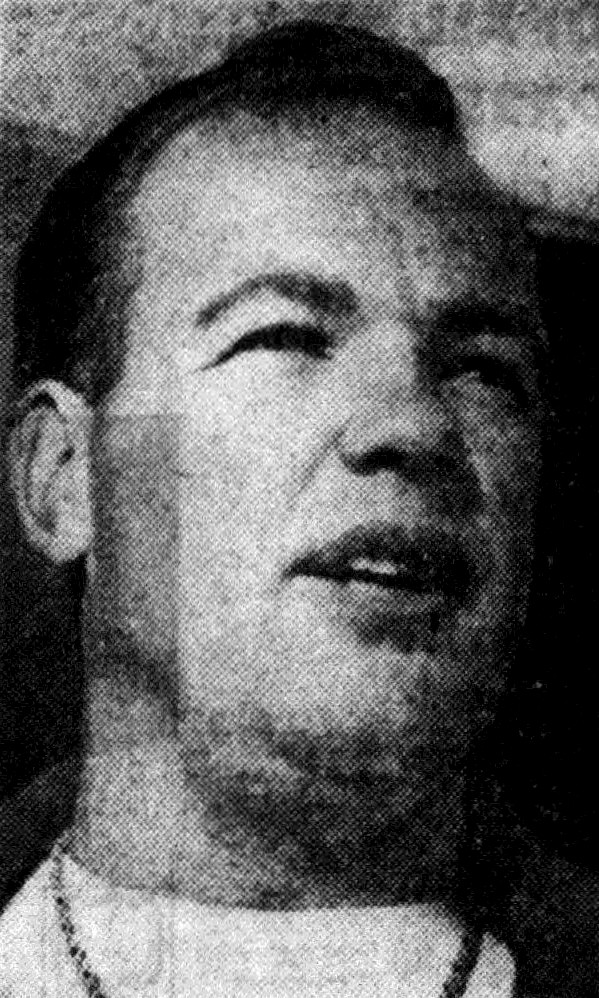
- Blackman, circa 1951

Biographical details
- Born: July 7, 1918; De Soto, Iowa, U.S.
- Died: March 18, 2000 (aged 81); Burlingame, California, U.S.

Playing career
- 1937: USC
- Position: End

Coaching career (HC unless noted)
- 1946–1948: Monrovia HS (CA)
- 1949–1952: Pasadena
- 1953–1954: Denver
- 1955–1970: Dartmouth
- 1971–1976: Illinois
- 1977–1982: Cornell

Head coaching record
- Overall: 168–112–7 (college); 34–7–2 (junior college)
- Bowls: 1–0 (junior college)

Accomplishments and honors

Championships
- 1 WSC (1951); 1 Skyline (1954); 7 Ivy (1958, 1962–1963, 1965–1966, 1969–1970)

Awards
- Walter Camp Coach of the Year Award (1970); Amos Alonzo Stagg Award (1991)
- College Football Hall of Fame; Inducted in 1987 (profile)

Robert L. Blackman (July 7, 1918 – March 18, 2000) was an American college football coach and player. He served as the head football coach at the University of Denver (1953–1954), Dartmouth College (1955–1970), the University of Illinois at Urbana–Champaign (1971–1976), and Cornell University (1977–1982), compiling a career college football head coaching record of 168–112–7. He was inducted into the College Football Hall of Fame as a coach in 1987.

== Early years and playing career ==
Blackman was born on July 7, 1918, in De Soto, Iowa. He played football at the University of Southern California, beginning in 1937. Blackman was named a captain of the freshmen team, but stopped playing after being stricken with polio. He was named an assistant coach at USC while still an undergraduate student.

== Coaching career ==
After head coaching stints at the San Diego Naval Academy, Pasadena City College, and the University of Denver, Blackman was named head coach at Dartmouth College in 1955, where he was universally known among players and students alike as "The Bullet." In 16 seasons under Blackman, Dartmouth had a record of 104–37–3, including undefeated seasons in 1962, 1965, and 1970 while leading Dartmouth to their first conference title in 60 years in 1958. They would win it six more times in his tenure, including his final season in 1970. In his final season at Dartmouth, Blackman received the Walter Camp Coach of the Year Award.

In 1971, Blackman became the head coach at the University of Illinois at Urbana-Champaign. In six seasons with the Fighting Illini, Blackman had a record of 29–36–1. Blackman returned to the Ivy League in 1977, where he replaced George Seifert as head coach of the Cornell University Big Red until 1982.

== Later years and death ==
Blackman retired to Hilton Head, South Carolina and died on March 18, 2000, in Burlingame, California.

== Head coaching record ==
=== College ===
Year	Team	Overall	Conference	Standing	Coaches^{#}	AP^{°}
Denver Pioneers (Skyline Conference) (1953–1954)
1953	Denver	3–5–2	1–5–1	T–7th		
1954	Denver	9–1	6–1	1st	18	
Denver:		12–6–2	7–6–1			
Dartmouth Indians (Independent) (1955)
1955	Dartmouth	3–6				
Dartmouth Indians (Ivy League) (1956–1970)
1956	Dartmouth	5–3–1	4–3	T–3rd		
1957	Dartmouth	7–1–1	5–1–1	2nd		
1958	Dartmouth	7–2	6–1	1st		
1959	Dartmouth	5–3–1	5–1–1	2nd		
1960	Dartmouth	5–4	4–3	T–3rd		
1961	Dartmouth	6–3	5–2	T–3rd		
1962	Dartmouth	9–0	7–0	1st		
1963	Dartmouth	7–2	5–2	T–1st		
1964	Dartmouth	6–3	4–3	4th		
1965	Dartmouth	9–0	7–0	1st		
1966	Dartmouth	7–2	6–1	T–1st		
1967	Dartmouth	7–2	5–2	2nd		
1968	Dartmouth	4–5	3–4	5th		
1969	Dartmouth	8–1	6–1	T–1st		
1970	Dartmouth	9–0	7–0	1st	14	14
Dartmouth:		104–37–3	79–24–2			
Illinois Fighting Illini (Big Ten Conference) (1971–1976)
1971	Illinois	5–6	5–3	T–3rd		
1972	Illinois	3–8	3–5	T–6th		
1973	Illinois	5–6	4–4	T–4th		
1974	Illinois	6–4–1	4–3–1	5th		
1975	Illinois	5–6	4–4	T–3rd		
1976	Illinois	5–6	4–4	T–3rd		
Illinois:		29–36–1	24–23–1			
Cornell Big Red (Ivy League) (1977–1981)
1977	Cornell	1–8	1–6	T–7th		
1978	Cornell	5–3–1	3–3–1	4th		
1979	Cornell	5–4	4–3	T–4th		
1980	Cornell	5–5	5–2	2nd		
1981	Cornell	3–7	2–5	T–5th		
1982	Cornell	4–6	3–4	T–4th		
Cornell:		23–33–1	18–23–1			
Total:		168–112–7				
National championship Conference title Conference division title or championship game berth
^{#}Rankings from final Coaches Poll.; ^{°}Rankings from final AP Poll.

=== Junior college ===
Year	Team	Overall	Conference	Standing	Bowl/playoffs
Pasadena Bulldogs (Western State Conference) (1949–1952)
1949	Pasadena	8–2–1	4–2	4th	
1950	Pasadena	6–3–1	3–2	3rd	
1951	Pasadena	12–0	4–0	1st	W Junior Rose Bowl
1952	Pasadena	8–2	4–1	2nd	
Pasadena:		34–7–2	15–5		
Total:		33–7–2			
National championship Conference title Conference division title or championship game berth

== See also ==
- List of presidents of the American Football Coaches Association
