= Carmen Cozza =

American athlete and football coach (1930–2018)

Biographical details
- Born: June 10, 1930; Parma, Ohio, U.S.
- Died: January 4, 2018 (aged 87); New Haven, Connecticut, U.S.

Playing career

Football
- 1949–1951: Miami (OH)

Baseball
- 1950–1952: Miami (OH)
- 1952: Fargo-Moorhead Twins
- 1952: Cedar Rapids Indians
- 1953: Superior Blues
- Position: Quarterback (football)

Coaching career (HC unless noted)

Football
- 1956–1962: Miami (OH) (assistant)
- 1963–1964: Yale (assistant)
- 1965–1996: Yale

Administrative career (AD unless noted)
- 1976–1977: Yale

Head coaching record
- Overall: 179–119–5

Accomplishments and honors

Championships
- 10 Ivy League (1967–1969, 1974, 1976–1977, 1979–1981, 1989)
- College Football Hall of Fame; Inducted in 2002 (profile)

Carmen Louis Cozza (June 10, 1930 – January 4, 2018) was an American football and baseball player and coach of football. He served as the head football coach at Yale University from 1965 to 1996, winning ten Ivy League championships and compiling a record of 179–119–5. Cozza was named UPI New England Coach of the Year four times and Eastern Coach of the Year. He was inducted into the College Football Hall of Fame as a coach in 2002.

== Biography ==
Cozza, the son of Italian immigrants, played quarterback at Miami University under coaches Ara Parseghian and Woody Hayes, graduating from Miami in 1952. He was teammates with Bo Schembechler. While at Miami he was a member of Delta Tau Delta International Fraternity. He also played baseball at Miami, and later played for minor league affiliates of the Cleveland Indians and Chicago White Sox. Cozza was an assistant football coach at Miami from 1956 to 1962 under his fellow Miami alumnus and former teammate, John Pont. When Pont was named head coach at Yale in 1963, Cozza accompanied him there. Cozza became head coach at Yale in 1965 after Pont accepted the head coaching job at Indiana University.

Cozza died on January 4, 2018, age 87.

== Head coaching record ==
Year	Team	Overall	Conference	Standing	Bowl/playoffs
Yale Bulldogs (Ivy League) (1965–1996)
1965	Yale	3–6	3–4	5th	
1966	Yale	4–5	3–4	5th	
1967	Yale	8–1	7–0	1st	
1968	Yale	8–0–1	6–0–1	1st	
1969	Yale	7–2	6–1	T–1st	
1970	Yale	7–2	5–2	T–2nd	
1971	Yale	4–5	3–4	T–5th	
1972	Yale	7–2	5–2	2nd	
1973	Yale	6–3	5–2	T–2nd	
1974	Yale	8–1	6–1	T–1st	
1975	Yale	7–2	5–2	3rd	
1976	Yale	8–1	6–1	T–1st	
1977	Yale	7–2	6–1	1st	
1978	Yale	5–2–2	4–1–2	3rd	
1979	Yale	8–1	6–1	1st	
1980	Yale	8–2	6–1	1st	
1981	Yale	9–1	6–1	T–1st	
1982	Yale	4–6	3–4	T–4th	
1983	Yale	1–9	1–6	8th	
1984	Yale	6–3	5–2	T–2nd	
1985	Yale	4–4–1	3–3–1	5th	
1986	Yale	3–7	2–5	T–6th	
1987	Yale	7–3	5–2	T–2nd	
1988	Yale	3–6–1	3–3–1	5th	
1989	Yale	8–2	6–1	T–1st	
1990	Yale	6–4	5–2	3rd	
1991	Yale	6–4	4–3	T–4th	
1992	Yale	4–6	2–5	T–6th	
1993	Yale	3–7	2–5	T–6th	
1994	Yale	5–5	3–4	T–4th	
1995	Yale	3–7	2–5	T–6th	
1996	Yale	2–8	1–6	8th	
Yale:		179–119–5	135–84–5		
Total:		179–119–5			
National championship Conference title Conference division title or championship game berth

== See also ==
- 1968 Yale vs. Harvard football game
