= Greg Dubinetz =

American football player (1954–1982)

No. 67
- Position: Guard

Personal information
- Born: April 15, 1954; Chicago, Illinois, U.S.
- Died: October 16, 1982 (aged 28)
- Listed height: 6 ft 4 in (1.93 m)
- Listed weight: 260 lb (118 kg)

Career information
- High school: Lake Forest (Lake Forest, Illinois)
- College: Yale
- NFL draft: 1975: 9th round, 220th overall pick

Career history
- Cincinnati Bengals (1975)*; Charlotte Hornets (1975); Toronto Argonauts (1976–1978); Washington Redskins (1979); Hamilton Tiger-Cats (1980)
- * Offseason or practice squad member only
- Stats at Pro Football Reference

Gregory George Dubinetz (April 15, 1954 – October 16, 1982) was an American professional football player who was a guard for the Washington Redskins of the National Football League (NFL). He played college football for the Yale Bulldogs and was selected by the Cincinnati Bengals in the ninth round of the 1975 NFL draft. He also played for the Charlotte Hornets, Toronto Argonauts and Hamilton Tiger-Cats. He was killed in an automobile accident in 1982.
