= List of Ivy League football standings =

This is a list of yearly Ivy League football standings.

== Ivy League standings ==
1956 Ivy League football standings
	Conf.					Overall
Team	W		L		T	W		L		T
Yale $	7	–	0	–	0	8	–	1	–	0
Princeton	5	–	2	–	0	7	–	2	–	0
Dartmouth	4	–	3	–	0	5	–	4	–	0
Penn	4	–	3	–	0	4	–	5	–	0
Brown	3	–	4	–	0	5	–	4	–	0
Columbia	2	–	5	–	0	3	–	6	–	0
Harvard	2	–	5	–	0	2	–	6	–	0
Cornell	1	–	6	–	0	1	–	8	–	0
$ – Conference champion

1957 Ivy League football standings
	Conf.					Overall
Team	W		L		T	W		L		T
Princeton $	6	–	1	–	0	7	–	2	–	0
Dartmouth	5	–	1	–	1	7	–	1	–	1
Yale	4	–	2	–	1	6	–	2	–	1
Brown	3	–	4	–	0	5	–	4	–	0
Cornell	3	–	4	–	0	3	–	6	–	0
Penn	3	–	4	–	0	3	–	6	–	0
Harvard	2	–	5	–	0	3	–	5	–	0
Columbia	1	–	6	–	0	1	–	8	–	0
$ – Conference champion

1958 Ivy League football standings
	Conf.					Overall
Team	W		L		T	W		L		T
Dartmouth $	6	–	1	–	0	7	–	2	–	0
Cornell	5	–	2	–	0	6	–	3	–	0
Princeton	5	–	2	–	0	6	–	3	–	0
Brown	4	–	3	–	0	6	–	3	–	0
Penn	4	–	3	–	0	4	–	5	–	0
Harvard	3	–	4	–	0	4	–	5	–	0
Columbia	1	–	6	–	0	1	–	8	–	0
Yale	0	–	7	–	0	2	–	7	–	0
$ – Conference champion

1959 Ivy League football standings
	Conf.					Overall
Team	W		L		T	W		L		T
Penn $	6	–	1	–	0	7	–	1	–	1
Dartmouth	5	–	1	–	1	5	–	3	–	1
Harvard	4	–	3	–	0	6	–	3	–	0
Yale	4	–	3	–	0	6	–	3	–	0
Cornell	3	–	4	–	0	5	–	4	–	0
Princeton	3	–	4	–	0	4	–	5	–	0
Brown	1	–	5	–	1	2	–	6	–	1
Columbia	1	–	6	–	0	2	–	7	–	0
$ – Conference champion

1960 Ivy League football standings
	Conf.					Overall
Team	W		L		T	W		L		T
No. 14 Yale $	7	–	0	–	0	9	–	0	–	0
Princeton	6	–	1	–	0	7	–	2	–	0
Dartmouth	4	–	3	–	0	5	–	4	–	0
Harvard	4	–	3	–	0	5	–	4	–	0
Columbia	3	–	4	–	0	3	–	6	–	0
Penn	2	–	5	–	0	3	–	6	–	0
Brown	1	–	6	–	0	3	–	6	–	0
Cornell	1	–	6	–	0	2	–	7	–	0
$ – Conference champion; Rankings from AP poll

1961 Ivy League football standings
	Conf.					Overall
Team	W		L		T	W		L		T
Columbia +	6	–	1	–	0	6	–	3	–	0
Harvard +	6	–	1	–	0	6	–	3	–	0
Dartmouth	5	–	2	–	0	6	–	3	–	0
Princeton	5	–	2	–	0	5	–	4	–	0
Yale	3	–	4	–	0	4	–	5	–	0
Cornell	2	–	5	–	0	3	–	6	–	0
Penn	1	–	6	–	0	2	–	7	–	0
Brown	0	–	7	–	0	0	–	9	–	0
+ – Conference co-champions

1962 Ivy League football standings
	Conf.					Overall
Team	W		L		T	W		L		T
Dartmouth $	7	–	0	–	0	9	–	0	–	0
Harvard	5	–	2	–	0	6	–	3	–	0
Columbia	4	–	3	–	0	5	–	4	–	0
Princeton	4	–	3	–	0	5	–	4	–	0
Cornell	4	–	3	–	0	4	–	5	–	0
Penn	2	–	5	–	0	3	–	6	–	0
Yale	1	–	5	–	1	2	–	5	–	2
Brown	0	–	6	–	1	1	–	6	–	2
$ – Conference champion

1963 Ivy League football standings
	Conf.					Overall
Team	W		L		T	W		L		T
Dartmouth +	5	–	2	–	0	7	–	2	–	0
Princeton +	5	–	2	–	0	7	–	2	–	0
Harvard	4	–	2	–	1	5	–	2	–	2
Yale	4	–	3	–	0	6	–	3	–	0
Cornell	4	–	3	–	0	5	–	4	–	0
Columbia	2	–	4	–	1	4	–	4	–	1
Brown	2	–	5	–	0	3	–	5	–	0
Penn	1	–	6	–	0	3	–	6	–	0
+ – Conference co-champions

1964 Ivy League football standings
	Conf.					Overall
Team	W		L		T	W		L		T
Princeton $	7	–	0	–	0	9	–	0	–	0
Harvard	5	–	2	–	0	6	–	3	–	0
Yale	4	–	2	–	1	6	–	2	–	1
Dartmouth	4	–	3	–	0	6	–	3	–	0
Cornell	3	–	4	–	0	3	–	5	–	1
Brown	3	–	4	–	0	5	–	4	–	0
Columbia	1	–	5	–	1	2	–	6	–	1
Penn	0	–	7	–	0	1	–	8	–	0
$ – Conference champion

1965 Ivy League football standings
	Conf.					Overall
Team	W		L		T	W		L		T
Dartmouth $	7	–	0	–	0	9	–	0	–	0
Princeton	6	–	1	–	0	8	–	1	–	0
Harvard	3	–	2	–	2	5	–	2	–	2
Cornell	3	–	3	–	1	4	–	3	–	2
Yale	3	–	4	–	0	3	–	6	–	0
Penn	2	–	4	–	1	4	–	4	–	1
Brown	1	–	6	–	0	2	–	7	–	0
Columbia	1	–	6	–	0	2	–	7	–	0
$ – Conference champion

1966 Ivy League football standings
	Conf.					Overall
Team	W		L		T	W		L		T
Dartmouth +	6	–	1	–	0	7	–	2	–	0
Harvard +	6	–	1	–	0	8	–	1	–	0
Princeton +	6	–	1	–	0	7	–	2	–	0
Cornell	4	–	3	–	0	6	–	3	–	0
Yale	3	–	4	–	0	4	–	5	–	0
Columbia	2	–	5	–	0	2	–	7	–	0
Penn	1	–	6	–	0	2	–	7	–	0
Brown	0	–	7	–	0	1	–	8	–	0
+ – Conference co-champions

1967 Ivy League football standings
	Conf.					Overall
Team	W		L		T	W		L		T
Yale $	7	–	0	–	0	8	–	1	–	0
Dartmouth	5	–	2	–	0	7	–	2	–	0
Cornell	4	–	2	–	1	6	–	2	–	1
Harvard	4	–	3	–	0	6	–	3	–	0
Princeton	4	–	3	–	0	6	–	3	–	0
Penn	2	–	5	–	0	3	–	6	–	0
Brown	1	–	5	–	1	2	–	6	–	1
Columbia	0	–	7	–	0	2	–	7	–	0
$ – Conference champion

1968 Ivy League football standings
	Conf.					Overall
Team	W		L		T	W		L		T
Harvard +	6	–	0	–	1	8	–	0	–	1
Yale +	6	–	0	–	1	8	–	0	–	1
Penn	5	–	2	–	0	7	–	2	–	0
Princeton	4	–	3	–	0	4	–	5	–	0
Dartmouth	3	–	4	–	0	4	–	5	–	0
Columbia	2	–	5	–	0	2	–	7	–	0
Cornell	1	–	6	–	0	3	–	6	–	0
Brown	0	–	7	–	0	2	–	7	–	0
+ – Conference co-champions

1969 Ivy League football standings
	Conf.					Overall
Team	W		L		T	W		L		T
Dartmouth +	6	–	1	–	0	8	–	1	–	0
Yale +	6	–	1	–	0	7	–	2	–	0
Princeton +	6	–	1	–	0	6	–	3	–	0
Cornell	4	–	3	–	0	4	–	5	–	0
Penn	2	–	5	–	0	4	–	5	–	0
Harvard	2	–	5	–	0	3	–	6	–	0
Brown	1	–	6	–	0	2	–	7	–	0
Columbia	1	–	6	–	0	1	–	8	–	0
+ – Conference co-champions

1970 Ivy League football standings
	Conf.					Overall
Team	W		L		T	W		L		T
No. 14 Dartmouth $	7	–	0	–	0	9	–	0	–	0
Yale	5	–	2	–	0	7	–	2	–	0
Harvard	5	–	2	–	0	7	–	2	–	0
Cornell	4	–	3	–	0	6	–	3	–	0
Princeton	3	–	4	–	0	5	–	4	–	0
Penn	2	–	5	–	0	4	–	5	–	0
Columbia	1	–	6	–	0	3	–	6	–	0
Brown	1	–	6	–	0	2	–	7	–	0
$ – Conference champion; Rankings from AP Poll

1971 Ivy League football standings
	Conf.					Overall
Team	W		L		T	W		L		T
Dartmouth +	6	–	1	–	0	8	–	1	–	0
Cornell +	6	–	1	–	0	8	–	1	–	0
Columbia	5	–	2	–	0	6	–	3	–	0
Harvard	4	–	3	–	0	5	–	4	–	0
Yale	3	–	4	–	0	4	–	5	–	0
Princeton	3	–	4	–	0	4	–	5	–	0
Penn	1	–	6	–	0	2	–	7	–	0
Brown	0	–	7	–	0	0	–	9	–	0
+ – Conference co-champions

1972 Ivy League football standings
	Conf.					Overall
Team	W		L		T	W		L		T
Dartmouth $	5	–	1	–	1	7	–	1	–	1
Yale	5	–	2	–	0	7	–	2	–	0
Penn	4	–	3	–	0	6	–	3	–	0
Cornell	4	–	3	–	0	6	–	3	–	0
Harvard	3	–	3	–	1	4	–	4	–	1
Princeton	2	–	4	–	1	3	–	5	–	1
Columbia	2	–	4	–	1	3	–	5	–	1
Brown	1	–	6	–	0	1	–	8	–	0
$ – Conference champion

1973 Ivy League football standings
	Conf.					Overall
Team	W		L		T	W		L		T
Dartmouth $	6	–	1	–	0	6	–	3	–	0
Harvard	5	–	2	–	0	7	–	2	–	0
Penn	5	–	2	–	0	6	–	3	–	0
Yale	5	–	2	–	0	6	–	3	–	0
Brown	4	–	3	–	0	4	–	3	–	1
Cornell	2	–	5	–	0	3	–	5	–	1
Columbia	1	–	6	–	0	1	–	7	–	1
Princeton	0	–	7	–	0	1	–	8	–	0
$ – Conference champion

1974 Ivy League football standings
	Conf.					Overall
Team	W		L		T	W		L		T
Harvard +	6	–	1	–	0	7	–	2	–	0
Yale +	6	–	1	–	0	8	–	1	–	0
Penn	4	–	2	–	1	6	–	2	–	1
Brown	4	–	3	–	0	5	–	4	–	0
Dartmouth	3	–	4	–	0	3	–	6	–	0
Princeton	3	–	4	–	0	4	–	4	–	1
Cornell	1	–	5	–	1	3	–	5	–	1
Columbia	0	–	7	–	0	1	–	8	–	0
+ – Conference co-champions

1975 Ivy League football standings
	Conf.					Overall
Team	W		L		T	W		L		T
Harvard $	6	–	1	–	0	7	–	2	–	0
Brown	5	–	1	–	1	6	–	2	–	1
Yale	5	–	2	–	0	7	–	2	–	0
Dartmouth	4	–	2	–	1	5	–	3	–	1
Princeton	3	–	4	–	0	4	–	5	–	0
Penn	2	–	5	–	0	3	–	6	–	0
Columbia	2	–	5	–	0	2	–	7	–	0
Cornell	0	–	7	–	0	1	–	8	–	0
$ – Conference champion

1976 Ivy League football standings
	Conf.					Overall
Team	W		L		T	W		L		T
Yale +	6	–	1	–	0	8	–	1	–	0
Brown +	6	–	1	–	0	8	–	1	–	0
Harvard	4	–	3	–	0	6	–	3	–	0
Dartmouth	4	–	3	–	0	6	–	3	–	0
Columbia	2	–	5	–	0	3	–	6	–	0
Penn	2	–	5	–	0	3	–	6	–	0
Princeton	2	–	5	–	0	2	–	7	–	0
Cornell	2	–	5	–	0	2	–	7	–	0
+ – Conference co-champions

1977 Ivy League football standings
	Conf.					Overall
Team	W		L		T	W		L		T
Yale $	6	–	1	–	0	7	–	2	–	0
Brown	5	–	2	–	0	7	–	2	–	0
Harvard	4	–	3	–	0	4	–	5	–	0
Penn	4	–	3	–	0	5	–	4	–	0
Dartmouth	4	–	3	–	0	6	–	3	–	0
Princeton	3	–	4	–	0	3	–	6	–	0
Cornell	1	–	6	–	0	1	–	8	–	0
Columbia	1	–	6	–	0	2	–	7	–	0
$ – Conference champion

1978 Ivy League football standings
	Conf.					Overall
Team	W		L		T	W		L		T
Dartmouth $	6	–	1	–	0	6	–	3	–	0
Brown	5	–	2	–	0	6	–	3	–	0
Yale	4	–	1	–	2	5	–	2	–	2
Cornell	3	–	3	–	1	5	–	3	–	1
Harvard	2	–	4	–	1	4	–	4	–	1
Columbia	2	–	4	–	1	3	–	5	–	1
Princeton	1	–	4	–	2	2	–	5	–	2
Penn	1	–	5	–	1	2	–	6	–	1
$ – Conference champion

1979 Ivy League football standings
	Conf.					Overall
Team	W		L		T	W		L		T
Yale $	6	–	1	–	0	8	–	1	–	0
Brown	5	–	2	–	0	6	–	3	–	0
Princeton	5	–	2	–	0	5	–	4	–	0
Cornell	4	–	3	–	0	5	–	4	–	0
Dartmouth	4	–	3	–	0	4	–	4	–	1
Harvard	3	–	4	–	0	3	–	6	–	0
Columbia	1	–	6	–	0	1	–	8	–	0
Penn	0	–	7	–	0	0	–	9	–	0
$ – Conference champion

1980 Ivy League football standings
	Conf.					Overall
Team	W		L		T	W		L		T
Yale $	6	–	1	–	0	8	–	2	–	0
Cornell	5	–	2	–	0	5	–	5	–	0
Harvard	4	–	3	–	0	7	–	3	–	0
Brown	4	–	3	–	0	6	–	4	–	0
Princeton	4	–	3	–	0	6	–	4	–	0
Dartmouth	4	–	3	–	0	4	–	6	–	0
Penn	1	–	6	–	0	1	–	9	–	0
Columbia	0	–	7	–	0	1	–	9	–	0
$ – Conference champion

1981 Ivy League football standings
	Conf.					Overall
Team	W		L		T	W		L		T
Yale +	6	–	1	–	0	9	–	1	–	0
Dartmouth +	6	–	1	–	0	6	–	4	–	0
Princeton	5	–	1	–	1	5	–	4	–	1
Harvard	4	–	2	–	1	5	–	4	–	1
Brown	2	–	5	–	0	3	–	7	–	0
Cornell	2	–	5	–	0	3	–	7	–	0
Columbia	1	–	6	–	0	1	–	9	–	0
Penn	1	–	6	–	0	1	–	9	–	0
+ – Conference co-champions

1982 Ivy League football standings
	Conf.					Overall
Team	W		L		T	W		L		T
Harvard +	5	–	2	–	0	7	–	3	–	0
Penn +	5	–	2	–	0	7	–	3	–	0
Dartmouth +	5	–	2	–	0	5	–	5	–	0
Princeton	3	–	4	–	0	3	–	7	–	0
Yale	3	–	4	–	0	4	–	6	–	0
Brown	3	–	4	–	0	5	–	5	–	0
Cornell	3	–	4	–	0	4	–	6	–	0
Columbia	1	–	6	–	0	1	–	9	–	0
+ – Conference co-champions

1983 Ivy League football standings
	Conf.					Overall
Team	W		L		T	W		L		T
Harvard +	5	–	1	–	1	6	–	2	–	2
Penn +	5	–	1	–	1	6	–	3	–	1
Brown	4	–	2	–	1	4	–	5	–	1
Dartmouth	4	–	2	–	1	4	–	5	–	1
Cornell	3	–	3	–	1	3	–	6	–	1
Princeton	2	–	5	–	0	4	–	6	–	0
Columbia	1	–	5	–	1	1	–	7	–	2
Yale	1	–	6	–	0	1	–	9	–	0
+ – Conference co-champions

1984 Ivy League football standings
	Conf.					Overall
Team	W		L		T	W		L		T
Penn $	7	–	0	–	0	8	–	1	–	0
Yale	5	–	2	–	0	6	–	3	–	0
Harvard	5	–	2	–	0	5	–	4	–	0
Brown	4	–	3	–	0	4	–	5	–	0
Princeton	3	–	4	–	0	4	–	5	–	0
Cornell	2	–	5	–	0	2	–	7	–	0
Dartmouth	2	–	5	–	0	2	–	7	–	0
Columbia	0	–	7	–	0	0	–	9	–	0
$ – Conference champion

1985 Ivy League football standings
	Conf.					Overall
Team	W		L		T	W		L		T
Penn $	6	–	1	–	0	7	–	2	–	1
Harvard	5	–	2	–	0	7	–	3	–	0
Princeton	5	–	2	–	0	5	–	5	–	0
Brown	4	–	3	–	0	5	–	4	–	1
Yale	3	–	3	–	1	4	–	4	–	1
Dartmouth	2	–	4	–	1	2	–	7	–	1
Cornell	2	–	5	–	0	3	–	7	–	0
Columbia	0	–	7	–	0	0	–	10	–	0
$ – Conference champion

1986 Ivy League football standings
	Conf.					Overall
Team	W		L		T	W		L		T
No. 7 Penn $	7	–	0	–	0	10	–	0	–	0
Cornell	6	–	1	–	0	8	–	2	–	0
Brown	4	–	2	–	1	5	–	4	–	1
Dartmouth	3	–	3	–	1	3	–	6	–	1
Harvard	3	–	4	–	0	3	–	7	–	0
Yale	2	–	5	–	0	3	–	7	–	0
Princeton	2	–	5	–	0	2	–	8	–	0
Columbia	0	–	7	–	0	0	–	10	–	0
$ – Conference champion; Rankings from NCAA Division I-AA Football Committee poll

1987 Ivy League football standings
	Conf.					Overall
Team	W		L		T	W		L		T
Harvard $	6	–	1	–	0	8	–	2	–	0
Brown	5	–	2	–	0	7	–	3	–	0
Yale	5	–	2	–	0	7	–	3	–	0
Princeton	4	–	3	–	0	6	–	4	–	0
Cornell	4	–	3	–	0	5	–	5	–	0
Penn	3	–	4	–	0	4	–	6	–	0
Dartmouth	1	–	6	–	0	2	–	8	–	0
Columbia	0	–	7	–	0	0	–	10	–	0
$ – Conference champion

1988 Ivy League football standings
	Conf.					Overall
Team	W		L		T	W		L		T
Penn +	6	–	1	–	0	9	–	1	–	0
Cornell +	6	–	1	–	0	7	–	2	–	1
Princeton	4	–	3	–	0	6	–	4	–	0
Dartmouth	4	–	3	–	0	5	–	5	–	0
Yale	3	–	3	–	1	3	–	6	–	1
Columbia	2	–	5	–	0	2	–	8	–	0
Harvard	2	–	5	–	0	2	–	8	–	0
Brown	0	–	6	–	1	0	–	9	–	1
+ – Conference co-champions

1989 Ivy League football standings
	Conf.					Overall
Team	W		L		T	W		L		T
Yale +	6	–	1	–	0	8	–	2	–	0
Princeton +	6	–	1	–	0	7	–	2	–	1
Harvard	5	–	2	–	0	5	–	5	–	0
Dartmouth	4	–	3	–	0	5	–	5	–	0
Cornell	2	–	5	–	0	4	–	6	–	0
Penn	2	–	5	–	0	4	–	6	–	0
Brown	2	–	5	–	0	2	–	8	–	0
Columbia	1	–	6	–	0	1	–	9	–	0
+ – Conference co-champions

1990 Ivy League football standings
	Conf.					Overall
Team	W		L		T	W		L		T
No. 17 Dartmouth +	6	–	1	–	0	7	–	2	–	1
Cornell +	6	–	1	–	0	7	–	3	–	0
Yale	5	–	2	–	0	6	–	4	–	0
Harvard	3	–	4	–	0	5	–	5	–	0
Penn	3	–	4	–	0	3	–	7	–	0
Princeton	2	–	5	–	0	3	–	7	–	0
Brown	2	–	5	–	0	2	–	8	–	0
Columbia	1	–	6	–	0	1	–	9	–	0
+ – Conference co-champions; Rankings from NCAA Division I-AA Football Committee poll

1991 Ivy League football standings
	Conf.					Overall
Team	W		L		T	W		L		T
Dartmouth $	6	–	0	–	1	7	–	2	–	1
Princeton	5	–	2	–	0	8	–	2	–	0
Harvard	4	–	2	–	1	4	–	5	–	1
Yale	4	–	3	–	0	6	–	4	–	0
Cornell	4	–	3	–	0	5	–	5	–	0
Penn	2	–	5	–	0	2	–	8	–	0
Brown	1	–	6	–	0	1	–	9	–	0
Columbia	1	–	6	–	0	1	–	9	–	0
$ – Conference champion

1992 Ivy League football standings
	Conf.					Overall
Team	W		L		T	W		L		T
Dartmouth +	6	–	1	–	0	8	–	2	–	0
Princeton +	6	–	1	–	0	8	–	2	–	0
Penn	5	–	2	–	0	7	–	3	–	0
Cornell	4	–	3	–	0	7	–	3	–	0
Harvard	3	–	4	–	0	3	–	7	–	0
Yale	2	–	5	–	0	4	–	6	–	0
Columbia	2	–	5	–	0	3	–	7	–	0
Brown	0	–	7	–	0	0	–	10	–	0
+ – Conference co-champions

1993 Ivy League football standings
	Conf.					Overall
Team	W		L		T	W		L		T
No. 16 Penn $	7	–	0	–	0	10	–	0	–	0
Dartmouth	6	–	1	–	0	7	–	3	–	0
Princeton	5	–	2	–	0	8	–	2	–	0
Brown	3	–	4	–	0	4	–	6	–	0
Cornell	3	–	4	–	0	4	–	6	–	0
Yale	2	–	5	–	0	3	–	7	–	0
Harvard	1	–	6	–	0	3	–	7	–	0
Columbia	1	–	6	–	0	2	–	8	–	0
+ – Conference co-champions; Rankings from The Sports Network poll

1994 Ivy League football standings
	Conf.					Overall
Team	W		L		T	W		L		T
No. 14 Penn $	7	–	0	–	0	9	–	0	–	0
Brown	4	–	3	–	0	7	–	3	–	0
Princeton	4	–	3	–	0	7	–	3	–	0
Cornell	3	–	4	–	0	6	–	4	–	0
Columbia	3	–	4	–	0	5	–	4	–	1
Yale	3	–	4	–	0	5	–	5	–	0
Dartmouth	2	–	5	–	0	4	–	6	–	0
Harvard	2	–	5	–	0	4	–	6	–	0
$ – Conference champion; Rankings from The Sports Network poll

1995 Ivy League football standings
	Conf.					Overall
Team	W		L		T	W		L		T
Princeton $	5	–	1	–	1	8	–	1	–	1
Penn	5	–	2	–	0	7	–	3	–	0
Cornell	5	–	2	–	0	6	–	4	–	0
Dartmouth	4	–	2	–	1	7	–	2	–	1
Columbia	3	–	4	–	0	3	–	6	–	1
Brown	2	–	5	–	0	5	–	5	–	0
Yale	2	–	5	–	0	3	–	7	–	0
Harvard	1	–	6	–	0	2	–	8	–	0
$ – Conference champion

1996 Ivy League football standings
	Conf.			Overall
Team	W		L	W		L
No. 17 Dartmouth $	7	–	0	10	–	0
Columbia	5	–	2	8	–	2
Brown	4	–	3	5	–	5
Cornell	4	–	3	4	–	6
Penn	3	–	4	5	–	5
Harvard	2	–	5	4	–	6
Princeton	2	–	5	3	–	7
Yale	1	–	6	2	–	8
$ – Conference champion; Rankings from The Sports Network poll

1997 Ivy League football standings
	Conf.			Overall
Team	W		L	W		L
Harvard $	7	–	0	9	–	1
Dartmouth	6	–	1	8	–	2
Brown	4	–	3	7	–	3
Cornell	4	–	3	6	–	4
Princeton	3	–	4	6	–	4
Columbia	3	–	4	4	–	6
Yale	1	–	6	2	–	8
Penn *	0	–	7	1	–	9
$ – Conference champion; * Standings reflect Penn's forfeit of five conference wins due to use of an ineligible player

1998 Ivy League football standings
	Conf.			Overall
Team	W		L	W		L
Penn $	6	–	1	8	–	2
Brown	5	–	2	7	–	3
Yale	5	–	2	6	–	4
Princeton	4	–	3	5	–	5
Columbia	3	–	4	4	–	6
Harvard	3	–	4	4	–	6
Cornell	1	–	6	4	–	6
Dartmouth	1	–	6	2	–	8
$ – Conference champion

1999 Ivy League football standings
	Conf.			Overall
Team	W		L	W		L
No. 25 Brown +	6	–	1	9	–	1
Yale +	6	–	1	9	–	1
Cornell	5	–	2	7	–	3
Penn	4	–	3	5	–	5
Harvard	3	–	4	5	–	5
Dartmouth	2	–	5	2	–	8
Columbia	1	–	6	3	–	7
Princeton	1	–	6	3	–	7
+ – Conference co-champions; Rankings from The Sports Network poll

2000 Ivy League football standings
	Conf.			Overall
Team	W		L	W		L
Penn $	6	–	1	7	–	3
Cornell	5	–	2	5	–	5
Yale	4	–	3	7	–	3
Harvard	4	–	3	5	–	5
Princeton	3	–	4	3	–	7
Columbia	1	–	6	3	–	7
Dartmouth	1	–	6	2	–	8
Brown *	4	–	3	7	–	3
$ – Conference champion; * Ineligible for conference championship

2001 Ivy League football standings
	Conf.			Overall
Team	W		L	W		L
No. 19 Harvard $	7	–	0	9	–	0
No. 24 Penn	6	–	1	8	–	1
Brown	5	–	2	6	–	3
Princeton	3	–	4	3	–	6
Columbia	3	–	4	3	–	7
Cornell	2	–	5	2	–	7
Dartmouth	1	–	6	1	–	8
Yale	1	–	6	3	–	6
$ – Conference champion; Rankings from The Sports Network poll

2002 Ivy League football standings
	Conf.			Overall
Team	W		L	W		L
No. 17 Penn $	7	–	0	9	–	1
Harvard	6	–	1	7	–	3
Princeton	4	–	3	6	–	4
Yale	4	–	3	6	–	4
Cornell	3	–	4	4	–	6
Dartmouth	2	–	5	3	–	7
Brown	2	–	5	2	–	8
Columbia	0	–	7	1	–	9
$ – Conference champion; Rankings from The Sports Network poll

2003 Ivy League football standings
	Conf.			Overall
Team	W		L	W		L
No. 12 Penn $	7	–	0	10	–	0
Harvard	4	–	3	7	–	3
Brown	4	–	3	5	–	5
Yale	4	–	3	6	–	4
Dartmouth	4	–	3	5	–	5
Columbia	3	–	4	4	–	6
Princeton	2	–	5	2	–	8
Cornell	0	–	7	1	–	9
$ – Conference champion; Rankings from The Sports Network poll

2004 Ivy League football standings
	Conf.			Overall
Team	W		L	W		L
No. 13 Harvard $	7	–	0	10	–	0
No. 21 Penn	6	–	1	8	–	2
Cornell	4	–	3	4	–	6
Brown	3	–	4	6	–	4
Princeton	3	–	4	5	–	5
Yale	3	–	4	5	–	5
Dartmouth	1	–	6	1	–	9
Columbia	1	–	6	1	–	9
$ – Conference champion; Rankings from The Sports Network poll

2005 Ivy League football standings
	Conf.			Overall
Team	W		L	W		L
No. 15 Brown $	6	–	1	9	–	1
Princeton	5	–	2	7	–	3
Harvard	5	–	2	7	–	3
Yale	4	–	3	4	–	6
Cornell	4	–	3	6	–	4
Penn	3	–	4	5	–	5
Dartmouth	1	–	6	2	–	8
Columbia	0	–	7	2	–	8
$ – Conference champion; Rankings from The Sports Network poll

2006 Ivy League football standings
	Conf.			Overall
Team	W		L	W		L
No. 18 Princeton +	6	–	1	9	–	1
No. 25 Yale +	6	–	1	8	–	2
Harvard	4	–	3	7	–	3
Penn	3	–	4	5	–	5
Cornell	3	–	4	5	–	5
Dartmouth	2	–	5	2	–	8
Columbia	2	–	5	5	–	5
Brown	2	–	5	3	–	7
+ – Conference co-champions; Rankings from The Sports Network poll

2007 Ivy League football standings
	Conf.			Overall
Team	W		L	W		L
No. 21 Harvard $	7	–	0	8	–	2
No. 22 Yale	6	–	1	9	–	1
Brown	4	–	3	5	–	5
Penn	3	–	4	4	–	6
Princeton	3	–	4	4	–	6
Dartmouth	3	–	4	3	–	7
Cornell	2	–	5	5	–	5
Columbia	0	–	7	1	–	9
$ – Conference champion; Rankings from The Sports Network poll

2008 Ivy League football standings
	Conf.			Overall
Team	W		L	W		L
No. 15 Harvard +	6	–	1	9	–	1
Brown +	6	–	1	7	–	3
Penn	5	–	2	6	–	4
Yale	4	–	3	6	–	4
Princeton	3	–	4	4	–	6
Cornell	2	–	5	4	–	6
Columbia	2	–	5	2	–	8
Dartmouth	0	–	7	0	–	10
+ – Conference co-champions; Rankings from The Sports Network poll

2009 Ivy League football standings
	Conf.			Overall
Team	W		L	W		L
No. 20 Penn $	7	–	0	8	–	2
Harvard	6	–	1	7	–	3
Brown	4	–	3	6	–	4
Columbia	3	–	4	4	–	6
Princeton	3	–	4	4	–	6
Yale	2	–	5	4	–	6
Dartmouth	2	–	5	2	–	8
Cornell	1	–	6	2	–	8
$ – Conference champion; Rankings from The Sports Network poll

2010 Ivy League football standings
	Conf.			Overall
Team	W		L	W		L
No. 18 Penn $	7	–	0	9	–	1
Harvard	5	–	2	7	–	3
Yale	5	–	2	7	–	3
Brown	5	–	2	6	–	4
Dartmouth	3	–	4	6	–	4
Columbia	2	–	5	4	–	6
Cornell	1	–	6	2	–	8
Princeton	0	–	7	1	–	9
$ – Conference champion; Rankings from The Sports Network poll

2011 Ivy League football standings
	Conf.			Overall
Team	W		L	W		L
No. 16 Harvard $	7	–	0	9	–	1
Brown	4	–	3	7	–	3
Dartmouth	4	–	3	5	–	5
Penn	4	–	3	5	–	5
Yale	4	–	3	5	–	5
Cornell	3	–	4	5	–	5
Columbia	1	–	6	1	–	9
Princeton	1	–	6	1	–	9
$ – Conference champion; Rankings from The Sports Network poll

2012 Ivy League football standings
	Conf.			Overall
Team	W		L	W		L
Penn $	6	–	1	6	–	4
Harvard	5	–	2	8	–	2
Brown	4	–	3	7	–	3
Dartmouth	4	–	3	6	–	4
Princeton	4	–	3	5	–	5
Cornell	2	–	5	4	–	6
Columbia	2	–	5	3	–	7
Yale	1	–	6	2	–	8
$ – Conference champion

2013 Ivy League football standings
	Conf.			Overall
Team	W		L	W		L
Harvard +	6	–	1	9	–	1
Princeton +	6	–	1	8	–	2
Dartmouth	5	–	2	6	–	4
Brown	3	–	4	6	–	4
Yale	3	–	4	5	–	5
Penn	3	–	4	4	–	6
Cornell	2	–	5	3	–	7
Columbia	0	–	7	0	–	10
+ – Conference co-champions

2014 Ivy League football standings
	Conf.			Overall
Team	W		L	W		L
No. 15 Harvard $	7	–	0	10	–	0
Dartmouth	6	–	1	8	–	2
Yale	5	–	2	8	–	2
Princeton	4	–	3	5	–	5
Brown	3	–	4	5	–	5
Penn	2	–	5	2	–	8
Cornell	1	–	6	1	–	9
Columbia	0	–	7	0	–	10
$ – Conference champion; Rankings from The Sports Network Poll

2015 Ivy League football standings
	Conf.			Overall
Team	W		L	W		L
No. 20 Harvard +	6	–	1	9	–	1
No. 23 Dartmouth +	6	–	1	9	–	1
Penn +	6	–	1	7	–	3
Yale	3	–	4	6	–	4
Brown	3	–	4	5	–	5
Princeton	2	–	5	5	–	5
Columbia	1	–	6	2	–	8
Cornell	1	–	6	1	–	9
+ – Conference co-champions; Rankings from STATS Poll

2016 Ivy League football standings
	Conf.			Overall
Team	W		L	W		L
Princeton +	6	–	1	8	–	2
Penn +	6	–	1	7	–	3
Harvard	5	–	2	7	–	3
Brown	3	–	4	4	–	6
Yale	3	–	4	3	–	7
Cornell	2	–	5	4	–	6
Columbia	2	–	5	3	–	7
Dartmouth	1	–	6	4	–	6
+ – Conference co-champions

2017 Ivy League football standings
	Conf.			Overall
Team	W		L	W		L
No. 24 Yale $	6	–	1	9	–	1
Columbia	5	–	2	8	–	2
Dartmouth	5	–	2	8	–	2
Penn	4	–	3	6	–	4
Harvard	3	–	4	5	–	5
Cornell	3	–	4	3	–	7
Princeton	2	–	5	5	–	5
Brown	0	–	7	2	–	8
$ – Conference champion; Rankings from STATS Poll

2018 Ivy League football standings
	Conf.			Overall
Team	W		L	W		L
No. 11 Princeton $	7	–	0	10	–	0
No. 18 Dartmouth	6	–	1	9	–	1
Harvard	4	–	3	6	–	4
Yale	3	–	4	5	–	5
Penn	3	–	4	6	–	4
Columbia	3	–	4	6	–	4
Cornell	2	–	5	3	–	7
Brown	0	–	7	1	–	9
$ – Conference champion; Rankings from STATS Poll

2019 Ivy League football standings
	Conf.			Overall
Team	W		L	W		L
No. 22 Dartmouth +	6	–	1	9	–	1
No. 25 Yale +	6	–	1	9	–	1
Princeton	5	–	2	8	–	2
Penn	3	–	4	5	–	5
Cornell	3	–	4	4	–	6
Harvard	2	–	5	4	–	6
Columbia	2	–	5	3	–	7
Brown	1	–	6	2	–	8
+ – Conference co-champions; Rankings from STATS Poll

2020 Ivy League football standings
	Conf.			Overall
Team	W		L	W		L
Brown		–			–
Columbia		–			–
Cornell		–			–
Dartmouth		–			–
Harvard		–			–
Penn		–			–
Princeton		–			–
Yale		–			–
Note: Due to COVID-19, the Ivy League suspended the 2020 football season.; Rankings from STATS Poll

2021 Ivy League football standings
	Conf.			Overall
Team	W		L	W		L
No. 20 Dartmouth +	6	–	1	9	–	1
No. 24 Princeton +	6	–	1	9	–	1
Harvard	5	–	2	8	–	2
Yale	4	–	3	5	–	5
Columbia	4	–	3	7	–	3
Penn	1	–	6	3	–	7
Brown	1	–	6	2	–	8
Cornell	1	–	6	2	–	8
+ – Conference co-champions; Rankings from STATS Poll

2022 Ivy League football standings
	Conf.			Overall
Team	W		L	W		L
Yale $	6	–	1	8	–	2
Penn	5	–	2	8	–	2
Princeton	5	–	2	8	–	2
Harvard	4	–	3	6	–	4
Columbia	3	–	4	6	–	4
Cornell	2	–	5	5	–	5
Dartmouth	2	–	5	3	–	7
Brown	1	–	6	3	–	7
$ – Conference champion; Rankings from STATS Poll

2023 Ivy League football standings
	Conf.			Overall
Team	W		L	W		L
Harvard +	5	–	2	8	–	2
Yale +	5	–	2	7	–	3
Dartmouth +	5	–	2	6	–	4
Princeton	4	–	3	5	–	5
Brown	3	–	4	5	–	5
Penn	3	–	4	6	–	4
Cornell	2	–	5	3	–	7
Columbia	1	–	6	3	–	7
+ – Conference co-champions; Rankings from STATS Poll

2024 Ivy League football standings
	Conf.			Overall
Team	W		L	W		L
Dartmouth +	5	–	2	8	–	2
No. 25 Harvard +	5	–	2	8	–	2
Columbia +	5	–	2	7	–	3
Yale	4	–	3	7	–	3
Cornell	3	–	4	4	–	6
Penn	2	–	5	4	–	6
Brown	2	–	5	3	–	7
Princeton	2	–	5	3	–	7
+ – Conference co-champions; Rankings from STATS Poll

2025 Ivy League football standings
	Conf.			Overall
Team	W		L	W		L
No. 15 Yale +^	6	–	1	9	–	3
No. 20 Harvard +^	6	–	1	9	–	2
Dartmouth	4	–	3	7	–	3
Penn	4	–	3	6	–	4
Cornell	3	–	4	4	–	6
Princeton	2	–	5	3	–	7
Brown	2	–	5	5	–	5
Columbia	1	–	6	2	–	8
+ – Conference co-champions; ^ – FCS playoff participant; Rankings from STATS Poll

2026 Ivy League football standings
	Conf.			Overall
Team	W		L	W		L
Brown	0	–	0	0	–	0
Columbia	0	–	0	0	–	0
Cornell	0	–	0	0	–	0
Dartmouth	0	–	0	0	–	0
Harvard	0	–	0	0	–	0
Penn	0	–	0	0	–	0
Princeton	0	–	0	0	–	0
Yale	0	–	0	0	–	0
+ – Conference co-champions; ^ – FCS playoff participant; Rankings from STATS Poll
