= List of Yale Bulldogs football seasons =

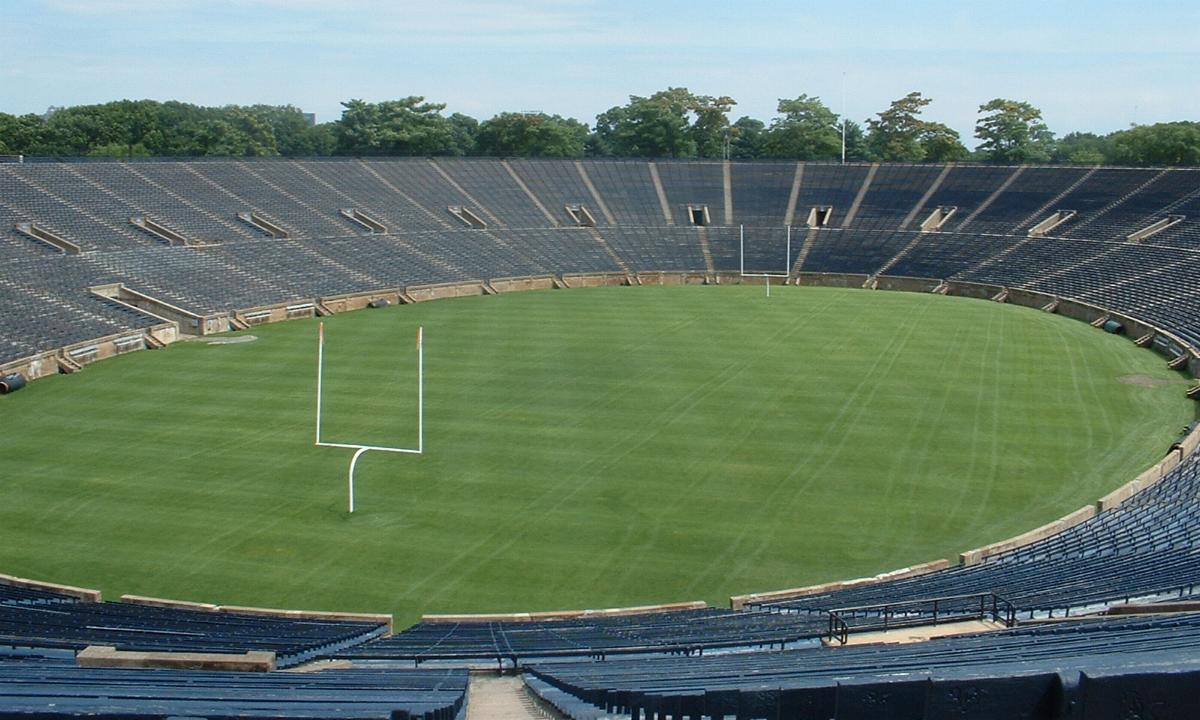
The Yale Bowl, where the Yale Bulldogs have played their home games since 1914.

This is a list of seasons completed by the Yale Bulldogs football team of the National Collegiate Athletic Association (NCAA) Division I Football Championship Subdivision (FCS). Since the team's inaugural 1872 season, Yale has participated in more than 1,300 officially sanctioned games, holding an all-time record of 953–396–55. The Bulldogs originally competed as a football independent before joining the Ivy League as a founding member in 1956.

== Seasons ==
Year	Coach	Overall	Conference	Standing	Bowl/playoffs	Coaches^{#}	AP^{°}
Independent (1872–1887)
1872	No coach	1–0					
1873	No coach	2–1					
1874	No coach	3–0					
1875	No coach	2–2					
1876	No coach	3–0					
1877	No coach	3–0–1					
1878	No coach	4–1–1					
1879	No coach	3–0–2					
1880	No coach	4–0–1					
1881	No coach	5–0–1					
1882	No coach	8–0					
1883	No coach	9–0					
1884	No coach	8–0–1					
1885	No coach	7–1					
1886	No coach	9–0–1					
1887	No coach	9–0					
Walter Camp (Independent) (1888–1892)
1888	Walter Camp	13–0					
1889	Walter Camp	15–1					
1890	Walter Camp	13–1					
1891	Walter Camp	13–0					
1892	Walter Camp	13–0					
William Rhodes (Independent) (1893–1894)
1893	William Rhodes	10–1					
1894	William Rhodes	16–0					
John A. Hartwell (Independent) (1895)
1895	John A. Hartwell	13–0–2					
Sam Thorne (Independent) (1896)
1896	Sam Thorne	13–1					
Frank Butterworth (Independent) (1897–1898)
1897	Frank Butterworth	9–0–2					
1898	Frank Butterworth	9–2					
James O. Rodgers (Independent) (1899)
1899	James O. Rodgers	7–2–1					
Malcolm McBride (Independent) (1900)
1900	Malcolm McBride	12–0					
George S. Stillman (Independent) (1901)
1901	George S. Stillman	11–1–1					
Joseph Swan (Independent) (1902)
1902	Joseph Swan	11–0–1					
George B. Chadwick (Independent) (1903)
1903	George B. Chadwick	11–1					
Charles D. Rafferty (Independent) (1904)
1904	Charles D. Rafferty	10–1					
Jack Owsley (Independent) (1905)
1905	Jack Owsley	10–0					
Foster Rockwell (Independent) (1906)
1906	Foster Rockwell	9–0–1					
William F. Knox (Independent) (1907)
1907	William F. Knox	9–0–1					
Lucius Horatio Biglow (Independent) (1908)
1908	Lucius Horatio Biglow	7–1–1					
Howard Jones (Independent) (1909)
1909	Howard Jones	10–0					
Ted Coy (Independent) (1910)
1910	Ted Coy	6–2–2					
John Field (Independent) (1911)
1911	John Field	7–2–1					
Art Howe (Independent) (1912)
1912	Art Howe	7–1–1					
Howard Jones (Independent) (1913)
1913	Howard Jones	5–2–3					
Frank Hinkey (Independent) (1914–1915)
1914	Frank Hinkey	7–2					
1915	Frank Hinkey	4–5					
Tad Jones (Independent) (1916–1918)
1916	Tad Jones	8–1					
1917	Tad Jones	3–0					
1918	No team						
Albert Sharpe (Independent) (1919)
1919	Albert Sharpe	5–3					
Tad Jones (Independent) (1920–1927)
1920	Tad Jones	5–3					
1921	Tad Jones	8–1					
1922	Tad Jones	6–3–1					
1923	Tad Jones	8–0					
1924	Tad Jones	6–0–2					
1925	Tad Jones	5–2–1					
1926	Tad Jones	4–4					
1927	Tad Jones	7–1					
Mal Stevens (Independent) (1928–1932)
1928	Mal Stevens	4–4					
1929	Mal Stevens	5–2–1					
1930	Mal Stevens	5–2–2					
1931	Mal Stevens	5–1–2					
1932	Mal Stevens	2–2–3					
Reginald D. Root (Independent) (1933)
1933	Reginald D. Root	4–4					
Ducky Pond (Independent) (1934–1940)
1934	Ducky Pond	5–3					
1935	Ducky Pond	6–3					
1936	Ducky Pond	7–1					12
1937	Ducky Pond	6–1–1					12
1938	Ducky Pond	2–6					
1939	Ducky Pond	3–4–1					
1940	Ducky Pond	1–7					
Spike Nelson (Independent) (1941)
1941	Spike Nelson	1–7					
Howard Odell (Independent) (1942–1947)
1942	Howard Odell	5–3					
1943	Howard Odell	4–5					
1944	Howard Odell	7–0–1					
1945	Howard Odell	6–3					
1946	Howard Odell	7–1–1					12
1947	Howard Odell	6–3					
Herman Hickman (Independent) (1948–1951)
1948	Herman Hickman	4–5					
1949	Herman Hickman	4–4					
1950	Herman Hickman	6–3					
1951	Herman Hickman	2–5–2					
Jordan Olivar (Independent) (1952–1955)
1952	Jordan Olivar	7–2					
1953	Jordan Olivar	5–2–2					
1954	Jordan Olivar	5–3–1					
1955	Jordan Olivar	7–2					
Jordan Olivar (Ivy League) (1956–1962)
1956	Jordan Olivar	8–1	7–0	1st		17	
1957	Jordan Olivar	6–2–1	4–2–1	3rd			
1958	Jordan Olivar	2–7	0–7	8th			
1959	Jordan Olivar	6–3	4–3	T–3rd			
1960	Jordan Olivar	9–0	7–0	1st		18	14
1961	Jordan Olivar	4–5	3–4	5th			
1962	Jordan Olivar	2–5–2	1–5–1	7th			
John Pont (Ivy League) (1963–1964)
1963	John Pont	6–3	4–3	T–4th			
1964	John Pont	6–2–1	4–2–1	3rd			
Carmen Cozza (Ivy League) (1965–1996)
1965	Carmen Cozza	3–6	3–4	5th			
1966	Carmen Cozza	4–5	3–4	5th			
1967	Carmen Cozza	8–1	7–0	1st			
1968	Carmen Cozza	8–0–1	6–0–1	T–1st			
1969	Carmen Cozza	7–2	6–1	T–1st			
1970	Carmen Cozza	7–2	5–2	T–2nd			
1971	Carmen Cozza	4–5	3–4	T–5th			
1972	Carmen Cozza	7–2	5–2	2nd			
1973	Carmen Cozza	6–3	5–2	T–2nd			
1974	Carmen Cozza	8–1	6–1	T–1st			
1975	Carmen Cozza	7–2	5–2	3rd			
1976	Carmen Cozza	8–1	6–1	T–1st			
1977	Carmen Cozza	7–2	6–1	1st			
1978	Carmen Cozza	5–2–2	4–1–2	3rd			
1979	Carmen Cozza	8–1	6–1	1st			
1980	Carmen Cozza	8–2	6–1	1st			
1981	Carmen Cozza	9–1	6–1	T–1st			
1982	Carmen Cozza	4–6	3–4	T–4th			
1983	Carmen Cozza	1–9	1–6	8th			
1984	Carmen Cozza	6–3	5–2	T–2nd			
1985	Carmen Cozza	4–4–1	3–3–1	5th			
1986	Carmen Cozza	3–7	2–5	T–6th			
1987	Carmen Cozza	7–3	5–2	T–2nd			
1988	Carmen Cozza	3–6–1	3–3–1	5th			
1989	Carmen Cozza	8–2	6–1	T–1st			
1990	Carmen Cozza	6–4	5–2	3rd			
1991	Carmen Cozza	6–4	4–3	T–4th			
1992	Carmen Cozza	4–6	2–5	T–6th			
1993	Carmen Cozza	3–7	2–5	6th			
1994	Carmen Cozza	5–5	3–4	T–4th			
1995	Carmen Cozza	3–7	2–5	T–6th			
1996	Carmen Cozza	2–8	1–6	8th			
Jack Siedlecki (Ivy League) (1997–2008)
1997	Jack Siedlecki	1–9 (Note: Penn forfeited a conference win over Yale due to the use of ineligible players, leading to an official record of 2–8 (1–6).)	0–7	8th			
1998	Jack Siedlecki	6–4	5–2	T–2nd			
1999	Jack Siedlecki	9–1	6–1	T–1st			
2000	Jack Siedlecki	7–3	4–3	T–3rd			
2001	Jack Siedlecki	3–6	1–6	T–7th			
2002	Jack Siedlecki	6–4	4–3	T–3rd			
2003	Jack Siedlecki	6–4	4–3	T–2nd			
2004	Jack Siedlecki	5–5	3–4	T–4th			
2005	Jack Siedlecki	4–6	4–3	T–4th			
2006	Jack Siedlecki	8–2	6–1	T–1st			25
2007	Jack Siedlecki	9–1	6–1	2nd		21	22
2008	Jack Siedlecki	6–4	4–3	4th			
Tom Williams (Ivy League) (2009–2011)
2009	Tom Williams	4–6	2–5	T–6th			
2010	Tom Williams	7–3	5–2	T–2nd			
2011	Tom Williams	5–5	4–3	T–2nd			
Tony Reno (Ivy League) (2012–present)
2012	Tony Reno	2–8	1–6	8th			
2013	Tony Reno	5–5	3–4	T–4th			
2014	Tony Reno	8–2	5–2	3rd			
2015	Tony Reno	6–4	3–4	T–4th			
2016	Tony Reno	3–7	3–4	T–4th			
2017	Tony Reno	9–1	6–1	1st		24	24
2018	Tony Reno	5–5	3–4	T–4th			
2019	Tony Reno	9–1	6–1	T–1st		24	25
2020	No team (Note: Yale did not compete during the 2020 season as a result of the COVID-19 pandemic and the subsequent cancellation of the Ivy League season.)						
2021	Tony Reno	5–5	4–3	T–4th			
2022	Tony Reno	8–2	6–1	1st			
2023	Tony Reno	7–3	5–2	T–1st			
2024	Tony Reno	7–3	4–3	4th			
2025	Tony Reno	9–3	6–1	T–1st	L NCAA Division I Second Round	13	15
Total:		953–396–55					
National championship Conference title Conference division title or championship game berth
^{†}Indicates Bowl Coalition, Bowl Alliance, BCS, or CFP / New Years' Six bowl.; ^{#}Rankings from final Coaches Poll.

== See also ==
- List of Ivy League football standings
