= Mike Cooley =

Mike Cooley may refer to:

- Mike Cooley (engineer) (1934–2020), Irish-born engineer and former trade union leader
- Mike Cooley (American football) (c. 1927–1988), American football player and coach
- Mike Cooley (musician) (born 1966), American songwriter, singer and guitarist
