= Len Jardine =

American football player and coach (1937–2010)

Biographical details
- Born: October 6, 1937
- Died: October 15, 2010 (aged 73); Chicago, Illinois, U.S.

Playing career
- 1957–1959: Purdue
- Positions: Guard, end

Coaching career (HC unless noted)
- 1960–1963: Loyola Academy (IL)
- 1964–1966: Purdue (assistant)
- 1967–1972: Brown

Head coaching record
- Overall: 9–44–1 (college)

Leonard Charles Jardine (October 6, 1937 – October 15, 2010) was an American football coach and player. He played at Purdue University from 1957 to 1959 and led the team in scoring receptions in 1959. Jardine was the head football coach at Loyola Academy in Wilmette, Illinois from 1960 to 1963 and was an assistant coach at Purdue under Jack Mollenkopf from 1964 to 1966. After Purdue went to the Rose Bowl at the end of the 1966 season, Jardine was hired by Brown University to replace coach John McLaughry. Jardine coached at Brown for six seasons, finishing with a record of 9–44–1. He died on October 15, 2010, in Chicago.

== Head coaching record ==
=== College ===
Year	Team	Overall	Conference	Standing	Bowl/playoffs
Brown Bears (Ivy League) (1967–1972)
1967	Brown	2–6–1	1–5–1	7th	
1968	Brown	2–7	0–7	8th	
1969	Brown	2–7	1–6	T–7th	
1970	Brown	2–7	1–6	T–7th	
1971	Brown	0–9	0–7	8th	
1972	Brown	1–8	1–6	8th	
Brown:		9–44–1	4–37–1		
Total:		9–44–1			
