= 1962 Harvard Crimson football team =

American college football season

1962 Harvard Crimson football
- Conference: Ivy League
- Record: 6–3 (5–2 Ivy)
- Head coach: John Yovicsin (6th season)
- Defensive coordinator: James S. Lentz (1st season)
- Captain: Richard C. Diehl
- Home stadium: Harvard Stadium

1962 Ivy League football standings
	Conf.					Overall
Team	W		L		T	W		L		T
Dartmouth $	7	–	0	–	0	9	–	0	–	0
Harvard	5	–	2	–	0	6	–	3	–	0
Columbia	4	–	3	–	0	5	–	4	–	0
Princeton	4	–	3	–	0	5	–	4	–	0
Cornell	4	–	3	–	0	4	–	5	–	0
Penn	2	–	5	–	0	3	–	6	–	0
Yale	1	–	5	–	1	2	–	5	–	2
Brown	0	–	6	–	1	1	–	6	–	2
$ – Conference champion

The 1962 Harvard Crimson football team was an American football team that represented Harvard University during the 1962 NCAA University Division football season. Harvard finished second in the Ivy League.

In their sixth year under head coach John Yovicsin, the Crimson compiled a 6–3 record and outscored opponents 202 to 118. Richard C. Diehl was the team captain.

Harvard's 5–2 conference record was the second best in the Ivy League standings. The Crimson outscored Ivy opponents 155 to 77.

Harvard played its home games at Harvard Stadium in the Allston neighborhood of Boston, Massachusetts.

== Schedule ==
Date	Opponent	Site	Result	Attendance	Source
September 29	Lehigh*	Harvard Stadium; Boston, MA	W 27–7	10,000	
October 6	at Cornell	Schoellkopf Field; Ithaca, NY	L 12–14	13,000	
October 13	Holy Cross*	Harvard Stadium; Boston, MA	L 20–34	23,000	
October 20	at Columbia	Baker Field; New York, NY	W 36–14	18,500	
October 27	Dartmouth	Harvard Stadium; Boston, MA (rivalry)	L 6–24	32,000	
November 3	Penn	Harvard Stadium; Boston, MA (rivalry)	W 36–0	5,000	
November 10	at Princeton	Palmer Stadium; Princeton, NJ (rivalry)	W 20–0	28,000	
November 17	Brown	Harvard Stadium; Boston, MA	W 31–19	14,000	
November 24	Yale	Harvard Stadium; Boston, MA (The Game)	W 14–6	39,000	
*Non-conference game
