= 1967 Harvard Crimson football team =

American college football season

1967 Harvard Crimson football
- Conference: Ivy League
- Record: 6–3 (4–3 Ivy)
- Head coach: John Yovicsin (11th season)
- Defensive coordinator: James S. Lentz (6th season)
- Captain: Donald J. Chiofaro
- Home stadium: Harvard Stadium

1967 Ivy League football standings
	Conf.					Overall
Team	W		L		T	W		L		T
Yale $	7	–	0	–	0	8	–	1	–	0
Dartmouth	5	–	2	–	0	7	–	2	–	0
Cornell	4	–	2	–	1	6	–	2	–	1
Harvard	4	–	3	–	0	6	–	3	–	0
Princeton	4	–	3	–	0	6	–	3	–	0
Penn	2	–	5	–	0	3	–	6	–	0
Brown	1	–	5	–	1	2	–	6	–	1
Columbia	0	–	7	–	0	2	–	7	–	0
$ – Conference champion

The 1967 Harvard Crimson football team was an American football team that represented Harvard University during the 1967 NCAA University Division football season. After gaining a share of the Ivy League crown the previous year, Harvard fell to a fourth-place tie in 1967.

In their eleventh year under head coach John Yovicsin, the Crimson compiled a 6–3 record and outscored opponents 256 to 144. Donald J. Chiofaro was the team captain.

Harvard's 4–3 conference record tied for fourth-best in the Ivy League standings. The Crimson outscored Ivy opponents 176 to 130.

Harvard played its home games at Harvard Stadium in the Allston neighborhood of Boston, Massachusetts.

Actor Tommy Lee Jones was a guard on the team.

== Schedule ==
Date	Opponent	Site	Result	Attendance	Source
September 30	Lafayette*	Harvard Stadium; Boston, MA	W 51–0	13,000–15,000	
October 7	Boston University*	Harvard Stadium; Boston, MA	W 29–14	31,621	
October 14	Columbia	Harvard Stadium; Boston, MA	W 49–13	14,000	
October 21	at Cornell	Schoellkopf Field; Ithaca, NY	W 14–12	20,000	
October 28	Dartmouth	Harvard Stadium; Boston, MA (rivalry)	L 21–23	40,000	
November 4	at Penn	Franklin Field; Philadelphia, PA (rivalry)	W 45–7	15,967	
November 11	Princeton	Harvard Stadium; Boston, MA (rivalry)	L 6–45	35,000	
November 18	at Brown	Brown Stadium; Providence, RI	W 21–6	14,400	
November 25	at Yale	Yale Bowl; New Haven, CT (The Game)	L 20–24	68,135	
*Non-conference game
