= 1962 Ivy League football season =

- League: NCAA University Division
- Sport: Football
- Duration: September 22, 1962 – November 24, 1962
- Teams: 8

1963 NFL Draft
- Top draft pick: Don McKinnon (Dartmouth)
- Picked by: New York Giants, 153rd overall

Regular season
- Champions: Dartmouth

Football seasons
- ← 1961 1963 →

1962 Ivy League football standings
	Conf.					Overall
Team	W		L		T	W		L		T
Dartmouth $	7	–	0	–	0	9	–	0	–	0
Harvard	5	–	2	–	0	6	–	3	–	0
Columbia	4	–	3	–	0	5	–	4	–	0
Princeton	4	–	3	–	0	5	–	4	–	0
Cornell	4	–	3	–	0	4	–	5	–	0
Penn	2	–	5	–	0	3	–	6	–	0
Yale	1	–	5	–	1	2	–	5	–	2
Brown	0	–	6	–	1	1	–	6	–	2
$ – Conference champion

The 1962 Ivy League football season was the seventh season of college football play for the Ivy League and was part of the 1962 NCAA University Division football season. The season began on September 22, 1962, and ended on November 24, 1962. Ivy League teams were 8–6–2 against non-conference opponents and Dartmouth won the conference championship.

== Season overview ==
Conf. Rank	Team	Head coach	AP final	AP high	Overall record	Conf. record	PPG	PAG
1	Dartmouth	Bob Blackman	NR	NR	9–0	7–0	26.2	6.3
2	Harvard	John Yovicsin	NR	NR	6–3	5–2	22.4	13.1
3 (tie)	Columbia	Aldo Donelli	NR	NR	5–4	4–3	13.8	22.9
3 (tie)	Princeton	Dick Colman	NR	NR	5–4	4–3	20.8	16.2
3 (tie)	Cornell	Tom Harp	NR	NR	4–5	4–3	18.7	26.3
6	Penn	John Stiegman	NR	NR	3–6	2–5	10.0	19.3
7	Yale	Jordan Olivar	NR	NR	2–5–2	1–5–1	11.3	12.0
8	Brown	John McLaughry	NR	NR	1–6–2	0–6–1	12.9	20.9

== Schedule ==
Index to colors and formatting
Ivy League member won
Ivy League member lost
Ivy League teams in **bold**

=== Week 1 ===
Date	Visiting team	Home team	Site	Result
September 22	Colgate	**Brown**	Brown Stadium • Providence, RI	**W** 6–2

=== Week 2 ===
Date	Visiting team	Home team	Site	Result
September 29	Massachusetts	Dartmouth	Memorial Field • Hanover, NH	**W** 27–3
September 29	Lehigh	Harvard	Harvard Stadium • Boston, MA	**W** 27–7
September 29	**Brown**	Columbia	Baker Field • New York City, NY	**COL** 22–20
September 29	Rutgers	Princeton	Palmer Stadium • Princeton, NJ	**W** 15–7
September 29	Colgate	Cornell	Schoellkopf Field • Ithaca, NY	**L** 12–23
September 29	Lafayette	Penn	Franklin Field • Philadelphia, PA	**W** 13–11
September 29	Connecticut	Yale	Yale Bowl • New Haven, CT	**W** 18–14

=== Week 3 ===
Date	Visiting team	Home team	Site	Result
October 6	**Penn**	**Dartmouth**	Memorial Field • Hanover, NH	**DART** 17–0
October 6	**Harvard**	**Cornell**	Schoellkopf Field • Ithaca, NY	**COR** 14–12
October 6	**Columbia**	**Princeton**	Palmer Stadium • Princeton, NJ	**PRIN** 33–0
October 6	**Yale**	**Brown**	Brown Stadium • Providence, RI	**T** 6–6

=== Week 4 ===
Date	Visiting team	Home team	Site	Result
October 13	**Dartmouth**	**Brown**	Brown Stadium • Providence, RI	**DART** 41–0
October 13	Holy Cross	**Harvard**	Harvard Stadium • Boston, MA	**L** 20–34
October 13	**Yale**	**Columbia**	Baker Field • New York City, NY	**COL** 14–10
October 13	**Princeton**	**Penn**	Franklin Field • Philadelphia, PA	**PRIN** 21–8
October 13	**Cornell**	Navy	Navy–Marine Corps Memorial Stadium • Annapolis, MD	**L** 0–41

=== Week 5 ===
Date	Visiting team	Home team	Site	Result
October 20	Holy Cross	**Dartmouth**	Memorial Field • Hanover, NH	**W** 10–0
October 20	**Harvard**	**Columbia**	Baker Field • New York City, NY	**HAR** 36–14
October 20	Colgate	**Princeton**	Palmer Stadium • Princeton, NJ	**L** 15–16
October 20	**Cornell**	**Yale**	Yale Bowl • New Haven, CT	**YALE** 26–8
October 20	**Brown**	**Penn**	Franklin Field • Philadelphia, PA	**PENN** 18–15

=== Week 6 ===
Date	Visiting team	Home team	Site	Result
October 27	**Dartmouth**	Harvard	Harvard Stadium • Boston, MA	**DART** 24–6
October 27	Lehigh	Columbia	Baker Field • New York City, NY	**W** 22–15
October 27	**Princeton**	Cornell	Schoellkopf Field • Ithaca, NY	**COR** 35–34
October 27	Rutgers	Penn	Franklin Field • Philadelphia, PA	**L** 7–12
October 27	Colgate	Yale	Yale Bowl • New Haven, CT	**T** 14–14
October 27	Rhode Island	Brown	Brown Stadium • Providence, RI	**T** 12–12

=== Week 7 ===
Date	Visiting team	Home team	Site	Result
November 3	**Dartmouth**	**Yale**	Yale Bowl • New Haven, CT	**DART** 9–0
November 3	**Penn**	**Harvard**	Harvard Stadium • Boston, MA	**HAR** 36–0
November 3	**Cornell**	**Columbia**	Baker Field • New York City, NY	**COL** 25–21
November 3	**Brown**	**Princeton**	Palmer Stadium • Princeton, NJ	**PRIN** 28–12

=== Week 8 ===
Date	Visiting team	Home team	Site	Result
November 10	**Columbia**	**Dartmouth**	Memorial Field • Hanover, NH	**DART** 42–0
November 10	**Harvard**	**Princeton**	Palmer Stadium • Princeton, NJ	**HAR** 20–0
November 10	**Cornell**	**Brown**	Brown Stadium • Providence, RI	**COR** 28–26
November 10	**Penn**	**Yale**	Yale Bowl • New Haven, CT	**PENN** 15–12

=== Week 9 ===
Date	Visiting team	Home team	Site	Result
November 17	**Dartmouth**	**Cornell**	Schoellkopf Field • Ithaca, NY	**DART** 28–21
November 17	**Brown**	**Harvard**	Harvard Stadium • Boston, MA	**HAR** 31–19
November 17	**Columbia**	**Penn**	Franklin Field • Philadelphia, PA	**COL** 21–7
November 17	'**Princeton**	**Yale**	Yale Bowl • New Haven, CT	**PRIN** 14–10

=== Week 10 ===
Date	Visiting team	Home team	Site	Result
November 24	**Dartmouth**	**Princeton**	Palmer Stadium • Princeton, NJ	**DART** 38–27
November 24	**Yale**	**Harvard**	Harvard Stadium • Boston, MA	**HAR** 14–6
November 24	Rutgers	**Columbia**	Baker Field • New York City, NY	**L** 6–22
November 24	**Cornell**	**Penn**	Franklin Field • Philadelphia, PA	**COR** 29–22

== 1963 NFL draft ==
One Ivy League player was drafted in the 1963 NFL draft, held in December 1962: Don McKinnon.

Rnd.	Pick No.	NFL team	Player	Pos.	College	Conf.	Notes
11	153	New York Giants	Don McKinnon	LB	Dartmouth	Ivy	
