= 1962 Rutgers Scarlet Knights football team =

American college football season

1962 Rutgers Scarlet Knights football

Middle Three champion
- Conference: Middle Three Conference
- Record: 5–5 (2–0 Middle Three)
- Head coach: John F. Bateman (3rd season)
- Captains: Tom Tappen; Tony Simonelli
- Home stadium: Rutgers Stadium

1962 Middle Three Conference football standings
	Conf.					Overall
Team	W		L		T	W		L		T
Rutgers $	2	–	0	–	0	5	–	5	–	0
Lehigh	1	–	1	–	0	3	–	6	–	0
Lafayette	0	–	2	–	0	3	–	6	–	0
$ – Conference champion

The 1962 Rutgers Scarlet Knights football team represented Rutgers University in the 1962 NCAA University Division football season. In their third season under head coach John F. Bateman, the Scarlet Knights compiled a 5–5 record, won the Middle Three Conference championship, and were outscored by their opponents 169 to 164. The team's statistical leaders included Bob Yaksick with 502 passing yards, Bill Thompson with 405 rushing yards, and Bill Craft with 426 receiving yards.

== Schedule ==
Date	Opponent	Site	Result	Attendance	Source
September 29	at Princeton*	Palmer Stadium; Princeton, NJ (rivalry)	L 7–15	40,000	
October 6	at Connecticut*	Memorial Stadium; Storrs, CT	L 9–15	6,852	
October 13	Colgate*	Rutgers Stadium; Piscataway, NJ	W 27–15	19,300	
October 20	at Lehigh	Taylor Stadium; Bethlehem, PA	W 29–12	8,000–12,000	
October 27	at Penn*	Franklin Field; Philadelphia, PA	W 12–7	10,466	
November 3	Lafayette	Rutgers Stadium; Piscataway, NJ	W 40–0	6,000	
November 10	at Delaware*	Delaware Stadium; Newark, DE	L 6–23	7,500–7,800	
November 17	Villanova*	Rutgers Stadium; Piscataway, NJ	L 12–34	19,500	
November 24	at Columbia*	Baker Field; New York, NY	W 22–6	15,225	
December 1	Virginia*	Rutgers Stadium; Piscataway, NJ	L 0–41	16,500	
*Non-conference game
