= 1969 Dartmouth Indians football team =

American college football season

1969 Dartmouth Indians football

Ivy League co-champion
- Conference: Ivy League
- Record: 8–1 (6–1 Ivy)
- Head coach: Bob Blackman (15th season)
- Captains: Ernest Babcock; John Ritchie
- Home stadium: Memorial Field

1969 Ivy League football standings
	Conf.					Overall
Team	W		L		T	W		L		T
Dartmouth +	6	–	1	–	0	8	–	1	–	0
Yale +	6	–	1	–	0	7	–	2	–	0
Princeton +	6	–	1	–	0	6	–	3	–	0
Cornell	4	–	3	–	0	4	–	5	–	0
Penn	2	–	5	–	0	4	–	5	–	0
Harvard	2	–	5	–	0	3	–	6	–	0
Brown	1	–	6	–	0	2	–	7	–	0
Columbia	1	–	6	–	0	1	–	8	–	0
+ – Conference co-champions

The 1969 Dartmouth Indians football team was an American football team that represented Dartmouth College during the 1969 NCAA University Division football season. Dartmouth was one of three Ivy League co-champions, its fifth league title of the 1960s.

In their 15th season under head coach Bob Blackman, the Indians compiled an 8–1 record and outscored opponents 282 to 99. John Ritchie and Ernest Babcock were the team captains.

The Indians' 6–1 conference record tied with Princeton and Yale as the best in the Ivy League. Dartmouth outscored Ivy opponents 213 to 93. Dartmouth defeated one of its co-champions, Yale, and suffered its lone loss in the final week of the year to the other co-champion, Princeton.

Dartmouth played its home games at Memorial Field on the college campus in Hanover, New Hampshire.

== Schedule ==
Date	Opponent	Site	Result	Attendance	Source
September 27	New Hampshire*	Cowell Stadium; Durham, NH (rivalry)	W 31–0	14,000	
October 4	Holy Cross*	Memorial Field; Hanover, NH	W 38–6	13,500	
October 11	Penn	Memorial Field; Hanover, NH	W 41–0	17,000	
October 18	at Brown	Brown Stadium; Providence, RI	W 38–13	15,000	
October 25	at Harvard	Harvard Stadium; Boston, MA (rivalry)	W 24–10	40,000	
November 1	at Yale	Yale Bowl; New Haven, CT	W 42–21	49,958	
November 8	at Columbia	Baker Field; New York, NY	W 37–7	8,713	
November 15	Cornell	Memorial Field; Hanover, NH (rivalry)	W 24–7	13,835	
November 22	at Princeton	Palmer Stadium; Princeton, NJ	L 7–35	35,000	
*Non-conference game
