= 1969 Brown Bears football team =

American college football season

1969 Brown Bears football
- Conference: Ivy League
- Record: 2–7 (1–6 Ivy)
- Head coach: Len Jardine (3rd season)
- Captains: D. Chenault; P. Foley
- Home stadium: Brown Stadium

1969 Ivy League football standings
	Conf.					Overall
Team	W		L		T	W		L		T
Dartmouth +	6	–	1	–	0	8	–	1	–	0
Yale +	6	–	1	–	0	7	–	2	–	0
Princeton +	6	–	1	–	0	6	–	3	–	0
Cornell	4	–	3	–	0	4	–	5	–	0
Penn	2	–	5	–	0	4	–	5	–	0
Harvard	2	–	5	–	0	3	–	6	–	0
Brown	1	–	6	–	0	2	–	7	–	0
Columbia	1	–	6	–	0	1	–	8	–	0
+ – Conference co-champions

The 1969 Brown Bears football team was an American football team that represented Brown University during the 1969 NCAA University Division football season. Brown tied for last in the Ivy League.

In third first season under head coach Len Jardine, the Bears compiled a 2–7 record and were outscored 190 to 95. D. Chenault and P. Foley were the team captains.

The Bears' 1–6 conference record tied for last in the Ivy League standings. They were outscored by Ivy opponents 180 to 48.

Brown played its home games at Brown Stadium in Providence, Rhode Island.

== Schedule ==
Date	Opponent	Site	Result	Attendance	Source
September 27	Rhode Island*	Brown Stadium; Providence, RI (rivalry)	W 21–0	12,200	
October 4	at Penn	Franklin Field; Philadelphia, PA	L 2–23	21,603	
October 11	Yale	Yale Bowl; New Haven, CT	L 13–27	16,800	
October 18	Dartmouth^{†}	Brown Stadium; Providence, RI	L 13–38	15,000	
October 25	Colgate*	Brown Stadium; Providence, RI	L 6–20	14,200	
November 1	at Princeton	Palmer Stadium; Princeton, NJ	L 6–33	14,000	
November 8	at Cornell	Schoellkopf Field; Ithaca, NY	L 7–14	10,000	
November 15	Harvard	Brown Stadium; Providence, RI	W 24–17	15,900	
November 22	Columbia	Brown Stadium; Providence, RI	L 3–18	12,000	
*Non-conference game; ^{†}Homecoming
