= 1962 Cornell Big Red football team =

American college football season

1962 Cornell Big Red football
- Conference: Ivy League
- Record: 4–5 (4–3 Ivy)
- Head coach: Tom Harp (2nd season)
- Captain: Tony Turel
- Home stadium: Schoellkopf Field

1962 Ivy League football standings
	Conf.					Overall
Team	W		L		T	W		L		T
Dartmouth $	7	–	0	–	0	9	–	0	–	0
Harvard	5	–	2	–	0	6	–	3	–	0
Columbia	4	–	3	–	0	5	–	4	–	0
Princeton	4	–	3	–	0	5	–	4	–	0
Cornell	4	–	3	–	0	4	–	5	–	0
Penn	2	–	5	–	0	3	–	6	–	0
Yale	1	–	5	–	1	2	–	5	–	2
Brown	0	–	6	–	1	1	–	6	–	2
$ – Conference champion

The 1962 Cornell Big Red football team was an American football team that represented Cornell University during the 1962 NCAA University Division football season. Cornell tied for third in the Ivy League .

In its second season under head coach Tom Harp, the team compiled a 4–5 record and was outscored 237 to 168. Tony Turel was the team captain.

Cornell's 4–3 conference record tied for third place in the Ivy League standings. The Big Red were outscored 173 to 156 by Ivy opponents.

Cornell played its home games at Schoellkopf Field in Ithaca, New York.

== Schedule ==
Date	Opponent	Site	Result	Attendance	Source
September 29	Colgate*	Schoellkopf Field; Ithaca, NY (rivalry)	L 12–23	14,000	
October 6	Harvard	Schoellkopf Field; Ithaca, NY	W 14–12	13,000	
October 13	at Navy*	Navy–Marine Corps Memorial Stadium; Annapolis, MD	L 0–41	23,358	
October 20	at Yale	Yale Bowl; New Haven, CT	L 8–26	25,541	
October 27	Princeton	Schoellkopf Field; Ithaca, NY	W 35–34	21,000	
November 3	at Columbia	Baker Field; New York, NY (rivalry)	L 21–25	4,450	
November 10	at Brown	Brown Stadium; Providence, RI	W 28–26	8,500	
November 17	Dartmouth	Schoellkopf Field; Ithaca, NY (rivalry)	L 21–28	18,000	
November 24	at Penn	Franklin Field; Philadelphia, PA (rivalry)	W 29–22	10,372	
*Non-conference game
