= Joseph Rockwell Swan (coach) =

American investment banker, football player, and coach (1878–1965)

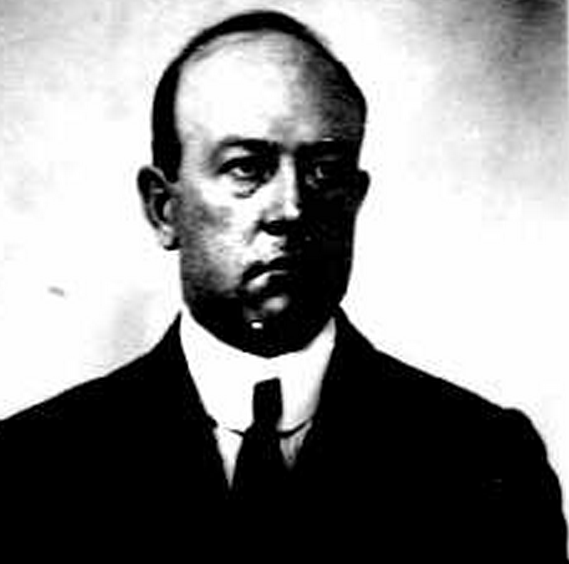
- Joseph R. Swan, 1921

Biographical details
- Born: October 21, 1878; Utica, New York, U.S.
- Died: November 1965; Boca Grande, Florida, U.S.

Playing career
- 1899–1901: Yale
- Position: End

Coaching career (HC unless noted)
- 1902: Yale

Head coaching record
- Overall: 11–0–1

Accomplishments and honors

Championships
- 1 national (1902)

Awards
- Second-team All-American (1901)

Joseph Rockwell Swan (October 21, 1878 – November 1965) was an American investment banker, football player and coach. He played college football for Yale University from 1899 to 1901 and was the head coach of the 1902 team. Swan later had a long and successful career in the investment banking business, serving as the president or senior partner of three major securities firms: Guaranty Company (1928–1934), Edward Smith & Co. (1934–1937), and Smith Barney & Co. (1937–1944). He was also affiliated with the New York Botanical Garden as its president (1937–1949) and chairman of the board (1949–1858).

== Early years ==
Swan was born in Utica, New York in 1878. He was the son of Joseph R. Swan and Emma Mann Swan. He attended preparatory school at the Groton School.

== Yale ==
Swan enrolled at Yale University and played for the Yale Bulldogs football team from 1899 to 1901. Swan was a member of the 1900 Yale team that finished its season with a perfect 13–0 record, outscoring opponents by a combined score of 336 to 10. After Yale ended its season with a 28–0 victory over Harvard, The New York Times wrote that the 1900 Yale team "was without question the strongest team that has been on the field since the Princeton team of 1889."

After graduating as part of Yale's class of 1902, Chadwick agreed to return as the school's head football coach in the fall of 1902. Swan coached the 1902 Yale football team to an 11–0–1 record, outscoring opponents 286 to 22. The 1902 team's only setback came in a 6–6 tie against Army.

During the period from 1899 to 1912, Yale had 14 different head football coaches in 14 years – despite compiling a combined record of 127–11–10 in those years. During that 14-year span, the Yale football team has also been recognized as the national championship team by one or more of the major national championship selectors on seven occasions – 1900 (Billingsley, Helms, Houlgate, National Championship Foundation, Parke Davis), 1901 (Parke Davis), 1902 (Parke Davis), 1905 (Parke Davis, Whitney), 1906 (Billingsley, Parke Davis, Whitney), 1907 (Billingsley, Helms, Houlgate, National Championship Foundation, Parke Davis, Whitney), and 1909 (Billingsley, Helms, Houlgate, National Championship Foundation, Parke Davis).

== Investment banking ==
Swan subsequently had a 40-year career in the investment banking field. He began his career with the National Commercial Bank of Albany and became secretary of the Union Trust Company of Albany. In 1910, he became a partner in the Wall Street firm of Kean, Taylor & Co.

During World War I, Swan served as an officer of the American Red Cross in Europe.

In December 1918, Swan was hired as a vice president of the Guaranty Trust Company. When the Guaranty Company was formed in 1920 as a securities firm and subsidiary of Guaranty Trust Company, Swan became a vice president. During the 1920s, he was active in the Investment Bankers Association and served as a member of its Board of Governors. In January 1928, Swan was elected as the president of the Guaranty Company.

Following the election of Franklin D. Roosevelt as President of the United States, Swan served on the Investment Bankers Code Committee and helped develop the Investment Bankers Code. In 1934, following the division of commercial and investment banking as part of the New Deal reforms, Swan became the senior partner of Edward B. Smith & Co., which took over much of the securities business of the Guaranty Company. He was also instrumental in the establishment of self-governance for the securities industry, including the formation of the National Association of Securities Dealers. He led Edward B. Smith & Co. in a 1937 merger with Charles D. Barney & Co., and became the senior partner of the merged company, Smith Barney & Co. Swan continued as the senior partner at Smith Barney until his retirement in January 1944.

Swan also served as the president of the New York Botanical Garden from 1937 to 1949 and as chairman of its board of managers from 1949 to 1958. When he retired from Smith Barney in 1944, Swan indicated that he intended to devote most of his attention to a 900-acre farm in Connecticut where he conducted experiments with flowers.

== Family ==
Swan was married to Nathalie Henderson Swan, and they had three daughters, Nathalie, Emma and Lois. Swan's wife was a founder of the Junior League of New York and a trustee of Bennington College and the Teachers College of Columbia University. She died in April 1965 at the couple's winter home in Florida. Swan died in November 1965 at his home in Boca Grande, Florida.

== Head coaching record ==
| Year | Team | Overall | Conference | Standing | Bowl/playoffs |
|---|---|---|---|---|---|
Yale Bulldogs (Independent) (1902)
| 1902 | Yale | 11–0–1 | | | |
| Yale: | | 11–0–1 | | | |
| Total: | | 11–0–1 | | | |
