= 1962 Brown Bears football team =

American college football season

1962 Brown Bears football
- Conference: Ivy League
- Record: 1–6–2 (0–6–1 Ivy)
- Head coach: John McLaughry (4th season)
- Captain: N. J. Spiezio
- Home stadium: Brown Stadium

1962 Ivy League football standings
	Conf.					Overall
Team	W		L		T	W		L		T
Dartmouth $	7	–	0	–	0	9	–	0	–	0
Harvard	5	–	2	–	0	6	–	3	–	0
Columbia	4	–	3	–	0	5	–	4	–	0
Princeton	4	–	3	–	0	5	–	4	–	0
Cornell	4	–	3	–	0	4	–	5	–	0
Penn	2	–	5	–	0	3	–	6	–	0
Yale	1	–	5	–	1	2	–	5	–	2
Brown	0	–	6	–	1	1	–	6	–	2
$ – Conference champion

The 1962 Brown Bears football team was an American football team that represented Brown University during the 1962 NCAA University Division football season. Brown finished last in the Ivy League.

In their fourth season under head coach John McLaughry, the Bears compiled a 1–6–2 record and were outscored 188 to 116. N.J. Spiezio was the team captain.

The Bears' 0–6–1 conference record placed eighth in the Ivy League standings. They were outscored by Ivy opponents 174 to 89.

Brown played its home games at Brown Stadium in Providence, Rhode Island.

== Schedule ==
Date	Opponent	Site	Result	Attendance	Source
September 22	at Colgate*	Colgate Athletic Field; Hamilton, NY	W 6–2	6,000	
September 29	at Columbia	Baker Field; New York, NY	L 20–22	8,277	
October 6	Yale	Brown Stadium; Providence, RI	T 6–6	8,000	
October 13	Dartmouth	Brown Stadium; Providence, RI	L 0–41	10,500	
October 20	at Penn	Franklin Field; Philadelphia, PA	L 15–18	10,268	
October 27	Rhode Island*	Brown Stadium; Providence, RI (rivalry)	T 12–12	10,000–12,000	
November 3	at Princeton	Palmer Stadium; Princeton, NJ	L 12–28	6,000	
November 10	Cornell	Brown Stadium; Providence, RI	L 26–28	8,500	
November 17	at Harvard	Harvard Stadium; Boston, MA	L 19–31	14,000	
*Non-conference game
