= 1962 Princeton Tigers football team =

American college football season

1962 Princeton Tigers football
- Conference: Ivy League
- Record: 5–4 (4–3 Ivy)
- Head coach: Dick Colman (6th season)
- Captain: Daniel Terpack
- Home stadium: Palmer Stadium

1962 Ivy League football standings
	Conf.					Overall
Team	W		L		T	W		L		T
Dartmouth $	7	–	0	–	0	9	–	0	–	0
Harvard	5	–	2	–	0	6	–	3	–	0
Columbia	4	–	3	–	0	5	–	4	–	0
Princeton	4	–	3	–	0	5	–	4	–	0
Cornell	4	–	3	–	0	4	–	5	–	0
Penn	2	–	5	–	0	3	–	6	–	0
Yale	1	–	5	–	1	2	–	5	–	2
Brown	0	–	6	–	1	1	–	6	–	2
$ – Conference champion

The 1962 Princeton Tigers football team was an American football team that represented Princeton University during the 1962 NCAA University Division football season. Princeton tied for third in the Ivy League.

In their sixth year under head coach Dick Colman, the Tigers compiled a 5–4 record and outscored opponents 187 to 146. Daniel Terpack was the team captain.

Princeton's 4–3 conference record tied for third-best in the Ivy League standings. The Tigers outscored Ivy opponents 157 to 123.

Princeton played its home games at Palmer Stadium on the university campus in Princeton, New Jersey.

== Schedule ==
Date	Opponent	Site	Result	Attendance	Source
September 29	Rutgers*	Palmer Stadium; Princeton, NJ (rivalry)	W 15–7	40,000	
October 6	Columbia	Palmer Stadium; Princeton, NJ	W 33–0	14,000	
October 13	at Penn	Franklin Field; Philadelphia, PA (rivalry)	W 21–8	14,139	
October 20	Colgate*	Palmer Stadium; Princeton, NJ	L 15–16	24,000	
October 27	at Cornell	Schoellkopf Field; Ithaca, NY	L 34–35	21,000	
November 3	Brown	Palmer Stadium; Princeton, NJ	W 28–12	6,000	
November 10	Harvard	Palmer Stadium; Princeton, NJ (rivalry)	L 0–20	28,000	
November 17	at Yale	Yale Bowl; New Haven, CT (rivalry)	W 14–10	39,300	
November 24	Dartmouth	Palmer Stadium; Princeton, NJ	L 27–38	42,000	
*Non-conference game
