= 1969 Penn Quakers football team =

American college football season

1969 Penn Quakers football
- Conference: Ivy League
- Record: 4–5 (2–5 Ivy)
- Head coach: Bob Odell (5th season)
- Captain: George Joseph
- Home stadium: Franklin Field

1969 Ivy League football standings
	Conf.					Overall
Team	W		L		T	W		L		T
Dartmouth +	6	–	1	–	0	8	–	1	–	0
Yale +	6	–	1	–	0	7	–	2	–	0
Princeton +	6	–	1	–	0	6	–	3	–	0
Cornell	4	–	3	–	0	4	–	5	–	0
Penn	2	–	5	–	0	4	–	5	–	0
Harvard	2	–	5	–	0	3	–	6	–	0
Brown	1	–	6	–	0	2	–	7	–	0
Columbia	1	–	6	–	0	1	–	8	–	0
+ – Conference co-champions

The 1969 Penn Quakers football team represented the University of Pennsylvania as a member of the Ivy League during the 1969 NCAA University Division football season. Led by fifth-year head coach Bob Odell, the Quakers compiled an overall record of 4–5 with a mark of 2–5 in conference play, tying for fifth place the Ivy League. George Joseph was the team captain. Penn played home games at Franklin Field on the university's campus in Philadelphia.

== Schedule ==
Date	Opponent	Site	Result	Attendance	Source
September 27	Bucknell*	Franklin Field; Philadelphia, PA	W 28–17	14,136	
October 4	Brown	Franklin Field; Philadelphia, PA	W 23–2	21,603	
October 11	at Dartmouth	Memorial Field; Hanover, NH	L 0–41	17,000	
October 18	Lehigh*	Franklin Field; Philadelphia, PA	W 13–7	27,000–27,002	
October 25	at Princeton	Palmer Stadium; Princeton, NJ (rivalry)	L 0–42	26,000	
November 1	Harvard	Franklin Field; Philadelphia, PA (rivalry)	L 6–20	30,943	
November 8	at Yale	Yale Bowl; New Haven, CT	L 3–21	33,545	
November 15	at Columbia	Baker Field; New York, NY	W 17–7	5,145	
November 22	Cornell	Franklin Field; Philadelphia, PA (rivalry)	L 14–28	50,357	
*Non-conference game
