= 1962 Penn Quakers football team =

American college football season

1962 Penn Quakers football
- Conference: Ivy League
- Record: 3–6 (2–5 Ivy)
- Head coach: John Stiegman (3rd season)
- Captain: Bill Hardaker
- Home stadium: Franklin Field

1962 Ivy League football standings
	Conf.					Overall
Team	W		L		T	W		L		T
Dartmouth $	7	–	0	–	0	9	–	0	–	0
Harvard	5	–	2	–	0	6	–	3	–	0
Columbia	4	–	3	–	0	5	–	4	–	0
Princeton	4	–	3	–	0	5	–	4	–	0
Cornell	4	–	3	–	0	4	–	5	–	0
Penn	2	–	5	–	0	3	–	6	–	0
Yale	1	–	5	–	1	2	–	5	–	2
Brown	0	–	6	–	1	1	–	6	–	2
$ – Conference champion

The 1962 Penn Quakers football team was an American football team that represented the University of Pennsylvania during the 1962 NCAA University Division football season. Penn finished sixth in the Ivy League.

In its third year under head coach John Stiegman, this team compiled a 3–6 record and was outscored 174 to 89. Bill Hardaker was the team captain.

Penn's 2–5 conference record placed sixth in the Ivy League. The Quakers were outscored 151 to 70 by Ivy opponents.

Penn played its home games at Franklin Field adjacent to the university's campus in Philadelphia, Pennsylvania.

== Schedule ==
Date	Opponent	Site	Result	Attendance	Source
September 29	Lafayette*	Franklin Field; Philadelphia, PA	W 13–11	8,716	
October 6	at Dartmouth	Memorial Field; Hanover, NH	L 0–17	6,000	
October 13	Princeton	Franklin Field; Philadelphia, PA (rivalry)	L 8–21	14,139	
October 20	Brown	Franklin Field; Philadelphia, PA	W 18–15	10,268	
October 27	Rutgers*	Franklin Field; Philadelphia, PA	L 7–12	10,466	
November 3	at Harvard	Harvard Stadium; Boston, MA (rivalry)	L 0–36	5,000	
November 10	at Yale	Yale Bowl; New Haven, CT	W 15–12	14,176	
November 17	Columbia	Franklin Field; Philadelphia, PA	L 7–21	8,649	
November 24	Cornell	Franklin Field; Philadelphia, PA (rivalry)	L 22–29	10,372	
*Non-conference game
