= 1967 Penn Quakers football team =

American college football season

1967 Penn Quakers football
- Conference: Ivy League
- Record: 3–6 (2–5 Ivy)
- Head coach: Bob Odell (3rd season)
- Captain: Wes Scovanner
- Home stadium: Franklin Field

1967 Ivy League football standings
	Conf.					Overall
Team	W		L		T	W		L		T
Yale $	7	–	0	–	0	8	–	1	–	0
Dartmouth	5	–	2	–	0	7	–	2	–	0
Cornell	4	–	2	–	1	6	–	2	–	1
Harvard	4	–	3	–	0	6	–	3	–	0
Princeton	4	–	3	–	0	6	–	3	–	0
Penn	2	–	5	–	0	3	–	6	–	0
Brown	1	–	5	–	1	2	–	6	–	1
Columbia	0	–	7	–	0	2	–	7	–	0
$ – Conference champion

The 1967 Penn Quakers football team was an American football team that represented the University of Pennsylvania during the 1967 NCAA University Division football season. Penn finished sixth in the Ivy League.

Penn played its home games at Franklin Field on the university's campus in Philadelphia, Pennsylvania.

In its third year under head coach Bob Odell, this team compiled a 3–6 record and was outscored 237 to 173. Wes Scovanner was the team captain.

Penn's 2–5 conference record placed sixth in the Ivy League. The Quakers were outscored 186 to 111 by Ivy opponents.

== Schedule ==
Date	Opponent	Site	Result	Attendance	Source
September 30	Lehigh*	Franklin Field; Philadelphia, PA	W 35–23	10,502	
October 7	Brown	Franklin Field; Philadelphia, PA	W 28–7	8,861	
October 14	at Dartmouth	Memorial Field; Hanover, NH	L 0–23	12,540	
October 21	Bucknell*	Franklin Field; Philadelphia, PA	L 27–28	12,000–12,647	
October 28	at Princeton	Palmer Stadium; Princeton, NJ (rivalry)	L 14–28	22,000	
November 4	Harvard	Franklin Field; Philadelphia, PA (rivalry)	L 7–45	15,967	
November 11	at Yale	Yale Bowl; New Haven, CT	L 22–44	31,740	
November 18	Columbia	Franklin Field; Philadelphia, PA	W 26–6	9,145	
November 25	Cornell	Franklin Field; Philadelphia, PA (rivalry)	L 14–33	8,906	
*Non-conference game
