= 1962 Dartmouth Indians football team =

American college football season

1962 Dartmouth Indians football

Ivy League champion
- Conference: Ivy League
- Record: 9–0 (7–0 Ivy)
- Head coach: Bob Blackman (8th season)
- Captain: William King
- Home stadium: Memorial Field

1962 Ivy League football standings
	Conf.					Overall
Team	W		L		T	W		L		T
Dartmouth $	7	–	0	–	0	9	–	0	–	0
Harvard	5	–	2	–	0	6	–	3	–	0
Columbia	4	–	3	–	0	5	–	4	–	0
Princeton	4	–	3	–	0	5	–	4	–	0
Cornell	4	–	3	–	0	4	–	5	–	0
Penn	2	–	5	–	0	3	–	6	–	0
Yale	1	–	5	–	1	2	–	5	–	2
Brown	0	–	6	–	1	1	–	6	–	2
$ – Conference champion

The 1962 Dartmouth Indians football team was an American football team that represented Dartmouth College during the 1962 NCAA University Division football season. The Indians were undefeated and won the Ivy League championship.

In their eighth season under head coach Bob Blackman, the Indians compiled a 9–0 record and outscored opponents 232 to 57. William King was the team captain.

The Indians' 7–0 conference record was the best in the Ivy League. The Indians outscored Ivy opponents 199 to 54.

Dartmouth played its home games at Memorial Field on the college campus in Hanover, New Hampshire.

== Schedule ==
Date	Opponent	Site	Result	Attendance	Source
September 29	UMass	Memorial Field; Hanover, NH	W 22–3	8,500	
October 6	Penn	Memorial Field; Hanover, NH	W 17–0	6,000	
October 13	at Brown	Brown Stadium; Providence, RI	W 41–0	10,500	
October 20	Holy Cross*	Memorial Field; Hanover, NH	W 10–0	13,909	
October 27	at Harvard	Harvard Stadium; Boston, MA (rivalry)	W 24–6	32,000	
November 3	at Yale	Yale Bowl; New Haven, CT	W 9–0	26,522	
November 10	Columbia	Memorial Field; Hanover, NH	W 42–0	8,500	
November 17	at Cornell	Schoellkopf Field; Ithaca, NY (rivalry)	W 28–21	18,000	
November 24	at Princeton	Palmer Stadium; Princeton, NJ	W 38–27	42,000	
*Non-conference game
