= 1969 Cornell Big Red football team =

American college football season

1969 Cornell Big Red football
- Conference: Ivy League
- Record: 4–5 (4–3 Ivy)
- Head coach: Jack Musick (4th season)
- Captains: Dennis Huff; Theo Jacobs
- Home stadium: Schoellkopf Field

1969 Ivy League football standings
	Conf.					Overall
Team	W		L		T	W		L		T
Dartmouth +	6	–	1	–	0	8	–	1	–	0
Yale +	6	–	1	–	0	7	–	2	–	0
Princeton +	6	–	1	–	0	6	–	3	–	0
Cornell	4	–	3	–	0	4	–	5	–	0
Penn	2	–	5	–	0	4	–	5	–	0
Harvard	2	–	5	–	0	3	–	6	–	0
Brown	1	–	6	–	0	2	–	7	–	0
Columbia	1	–	6	–	0	1	–	8	–	0
+ – Conference co-champions

The 1969 Cornell Big Red football team was an American football team that represented Cornell University during the 1969 NCAA University Division football season. Cornell finished fourth in the Ivy League .

In its second season under head coach Jack Musick, the team compiled a 4–5 record and was outscored 162 to 148. Theo Jacobs and Dennis Huff were the team captains.

Cornell's 4–3 conference record placed fourth in the Ivy League standings. The Big Red outscored Ivy opponents 127 to 113.

Cornell played its home games at Schoellkopf Field in Ithaca, New York.

== Schedule ==
Date	Opponent	Site	Result	Attendance	Source
September 27	Colgate*	Schoellkopf Field; Ithaca, NY (rivalry)	L 24–28	18,000	
October 4	at Rutgers*	Rutgers Stadium; Piscataway, NJ	L 7–21	17,000	
October 11	Princeton^{†}	Schoellkopf Field; Ithaca, NY	L 17–24	18,000	
October 18	Harvard	Schoellkopf Field; Ithaca, NY	W 41–24	14,000	
October 25	at Yale	Yale Bowl; New Haven, CT	L 0–17	32,151	
November 1	Columbia	Schoellkopf Field; Ithaca, NY (rivalry)	W 10–3	10,000	
November 8	Brown	Schoellkopf Field; Ithaca, NY	W 14–7	10,000	
November 15	at Dartmouth	Memorial Field; Hanover, NH (rivalry)	L 7–24	13,835	
November 22	at Penn	Franklin Field; Philadelphia, PA (rivalry)	W 28–14	50,357	
*Non-conference game; ^{†}Homecoming
