= 1967 Brown Bears football team =

American college football season

1967 Brown Bears football
- Conference: Ivy League
- Record: 2–6–1 (1–5–1 Ivy)
- Head coach: Len Jardine (1st season)
- Captains: J. Batty; Tom Whidden
- Home stadium: Brown Stadium

1967 Ivy League football standings
	Conf.					Overall
Team	W		L		T	W		L		T
Yale $	7	–	0	–	0	8	–	1	–	0
Dartmouth	5	–	2	–	0	7	–	2	–	0
Cornell	4	–	2	–	1	6	–	2	–	1
Harvard	4	–	3	–	0	6	–	3	–	0
Princeton	4	–	3	–	0	6	–	3	–	0
Penn	2	–	5	–	0	3	–	6	–	0
Brown	1	–	5	–	1	2	–	6	–	1
Columbia	0	–	7	–	0	2	–	7	–	0
$ – Conference champion

The 1967 Brown Bears football team was an American football team that represented Brown University during the 1967 NCAA University Division football season. Brown finished second-to-last in the Ivy League.

In their first season under head coach Len Jardine, the Bears compiled a 2–6–1 record and were outscored 206 to 77. Tom Whidden and J. Batty were the team captains.

The Bears' 1–5–1 conference record placed seventh in the Ivy League standings. They were outscored by Ivy opponents 194 to 61.

Brown played its home games at Brown Stadium in Providence, Rhode Island.

== Schedule ==
Date	Opponent	Site	Result	Attendance	Source
September 30	Rhode Island*	Brown Stadium; Providence, RI (rivalry)	L 8–12	8,000–8,400	
October 7	at Penn	Franklin Field; Philadelphia, PA	L 7–28	8,861	
October 14	at Yale	Yale Bowl; New Haven, CT	L 0–35	8,900	
October 21	Dartmouth^{†}	Brown Stadium; Providence, RI	L 7–41	11,600	
October 28	Colgate*	Brown Stadium; Providence, RI	W 7–0	8,400	
November 4	at Princeton	Palmer Stadium; Princeton, NJ	L 14–48	10,000	
November 11	at Cornell	Schoellkopf Field; Ithaca, NY	T 14–14	10,000	
November 18	Harvard	Brown Stadium; Providence, RI	L 6–21	14,400	
November 25	Columbia	Brown Stadium; Providence, RI	W 14–7	5,300	
*Non-conference game; ^{†}Homecoming
