= 1969 Princeton Tigers football team =

American college football season

1969 Princeton Tigers football

Ivy League co-champion
- Conference: Ivy League
- Record: 6–3 (6–1 Ivy)
- Head coach: Jake McCandless (1st season)
- Captain: Ellis O. Moore
- Home stadium: Palmer Stadium

1969 Ivy League football standings
	Conf.					Overall
Team	W		L		T	W		L		T
Dartmouth +	6	–	1	–	0	8	–	1	–	0
Yale +	6	–	1	–	0	7	–	2	–	0
Princeton +	6	–	1	–	0	6	–	3	–	0
Cornell	4	–	3	–	0	4	–	5	–	0
Penn	2	–	5	–	0	4	–	5	–	0
Harvard	2	–	5	–	0	3	–	6	–	0
Brown	1	–	6	–	0	2	–	7	–	0
Columbia	1	–	6	–	0	1	–	8	–	0
+ – Conference co-champions

The 1969 Princeton Tigers football team was an American football team that represented Princeton University during the 1969 NCAA University Division football season. Princeton was one of three Ivy League co-champions.

In their first year under head coach Jake McCandless, the Tigers compiled a 6–3 record and outscored opponents 248 to 138. Ellis O. Moore was the team captain.

Princeton's 6–1 conference record tied with Dartmouth and Yale as the best in the Ivy League. The Tigers outscored Ivy opponents 220 to 74.

Princeton played its home games at Palmer Stadium on the university campus in Princeton, New Jersey.

== Schedule ==
Date	Opponent	Site	Result	Attendance	Source
September 27	at Rutgers*	Rutgers Stadium; Piscataway, NJ (rivalry)	L 0–29	31,000	
October 4	at Columbia	Baker Field; New York, NY	W 21–7	12,415	
October 11	at Cornell	Schoellkopf Field; Ithaca, NY	W 24–17	18,000	
October 18	Colgate*	Palmer Stadium; Princeton, NJ	L 28–35	22,000	
October 25	Penn	Palmer Stadium; Princeton, NJ (rivalry)	W 42–0	26,000	
November 1	Brown	Palmer Stadium; Princeton, NJ	W 33–6	14,000	
November 8	at Harvard	Harvard Stadium; Boston, MA (rivalry)	W 51–20	28,000	
November 15	Yale	Palmer Stadium; Princeton, NJ (rivalry)	L 14–17	35,000	
November 22	Dartmouth	Palmer Stadium; Princeton, NJ	W 35–7	35,000	
*Non-conference game
