= 1967 Dartmouth Indians football team =

American college football season

1967 Dartmouth Indians football
- Conference: Ivy League
- Record: 7–2 (5–2 Ivy)
- Head coach: Bob Blackman (13th season)
- Captain: Stephen Luxford
- Home stadium: Memorial Field

1967 Ivy League football standings
	Conf.					Overall
Team	W		L		T	W		L		T
Yale $	7	–	0	–	0	8	–	1	–	0
Dartmouth	5	–	2	–	0	7	–	2	–	0
Cornell	4	–	2	–	1	6	–	2	–	1
Harvard	4	–	3	–	0	6	–	3	–	0
Princeton	4	–	3	–	0	6	–	3	–	0
Penn	2	–	5	–	0	3	–	6	–	0
Brown	1	–	5	–	1	2	–	6	–	1
Columbia	0	–	7	–	0	2	–	7	–	0
$ – Conference champion

The 1967 Dartmouth Indians football team was an American football team that represented Dartmouth College during the 1967 NCAA University Division football season. Following two championship-winning years, Dartmouth fell to second in the Ivy League.

In their 13th season under head coach Bob Blackman, the Indians compiled a 7–2 record and outscored opponents 205 to 146. Stephen Luxford was the team captain.

The Indians' 5–2 conference record placed second in the Ivy League standings. They outscored Ivy opponents 153 to 128.

Dartmouth played its home games at Memorial Field on the college campus in Hanover, New Hampshire.

== Schedule ==
Date	Opponent	Site	Result	Attendance	Source
September 30	at Massachusetts*	Alumni Stadium; Hadley, MA	W 28–10	18,100	
October 7	Holy Cross*	Memorial Field; Hanover, NH	W 24–8	14,153	
October 14	Penn	Memorial Field; Hanover, NH	W 23–0	12,540	
October 21	at Brown	Brown Stadium; Providence, RI	W 41–6	11,600	
October 28	at Harvard	Harvard Stadium; Boston, MA (rivalry)	W 23–21	40,000	
November 4	at Yale	Yale Bowl; New Haven, CT	L 15–56	49,362	
November 11	at Columbia	Baker Field; New York, NY	W 13–7	10,000	
November 18	Cornell	Memorial Field; Hanover, NH (rivalry)	L 21–24	12,569	
November 25	at Princeton	Palmer Stadium; Princeton, NJ	W 17–14	31,000	
*Non-conference game
