= 1969 Columbia Lions football team =

American college football season

1969 Columbia Lions football
- Conference: Ivy League
- Record: 1–8 (1–6 Ivy)
- Head coach: Frank Navarro (2nd season)
- Captains: Kenneth Alexander; Richard Alexander
- Home stadium: Baker Field

1969 Ivy League football standings
	Conf.					Overall
Team	W		L		T	W		L		T
Dartmouth +	6	–	1	–	0	8	–	1	–	0
Yale +	6	–	1	–	0	7	–	2	–	0
Princeton +	6	–	1	–	0	6	–	3	–	0
Cornell	4	–	3	–	0	4	–	5	–	0
Penn	2	–	5	–	0	4	–	5	–	0
Harvard	2	–	5	–	0	3	–	6	–	0
Brown	1	–	6	–	0	2	–	7	–	0
Columbia	1	–	6	–	0	1	–	8	–	0
+ – Conference co-champions

The 1969 Columbia Lions football team was an American football team that represented Columbia University during the 1969 NCAA University Division football season. Columbia tied for last in the Ivy League.

In their second season under head coach Frank Navarro, the Lions compiled a 1–8 record and were outscored 237 to 84. Kenneth Alexander and Richard Alexander were the team captains.

The Lions' 1–6 conference record tied for last in the Ivy League standings. Columbia was outscored 170 to 68 by Ivy opponents.

Columbia played its home games at Baker Field in Upper Manhattan, in New York City.

== Schedule ==
Date	Opponent	Site	Result	Attendance	Source
September 27	Lafayette*	Baker Field; New York, NY	L 22–36	7,626–7,676	
October 4	Princeton	Baker Field; New York, NY	L 7–21	12,415	
October 11	at Harvard	Harvard Stadium; Boston, MA	L 0–51	15,000	
October 18	Yale^{†}	Baker Field; New York, NY	L 6–41	15,114	
October 25	at Rutgers*	Rutgers Stadium; Piscataway, NJ	L 14–21	17,000	
November 1	at Cornell	Schoellkopf Field; Ithaca, NY (rivalry)	L 3–10	10,000	
November 8	Dartmouth	Baker Field; New York, NY	L 7–37	8,713	
November 15	Penn	Baker Field; New York, NY	L 7–17	5,145	
November 22	at Brown	Brown Stadium; Providence, RI	W 18–3	12,000	
*Non-conference game; ^{†}Homecoming
