= 1967 Columbia Lions football team =

American college football season

1967 Columbia Lions football
- Conference: Ivy League
- Record: 2–7 (0–7 Ivy)
- Head coach: Aldo Donelli (11th season)
- Captains: Donald Hubert; Thomas Reed
- Home stadium: Baker Field

1967 Ivy League football standings
	Conf.					Overall
Team	W		L		T	W		L		T
Yale $	7	–	0	–	0	8	–	1	–	0
Dartmouth	5	–	2	–	0	7	–	2	–	0
Cornell	4	–	2	–	1	6	–	2	–	1
Harvard	4	–	3	–	0	6	–	3	–	0
Princeton	4	–	3	–	0	6	–	3	–	0
Penn	2	–	5	–	0	3	–	6	–	0
Brown	1	–	5	–	1	2	–	6	–	1
Columbia	0	–	7	–	0	2	–	7	–	0
$ – Conference champion

The 1967 Columbia Lions football team was an American football team that represented Columbia University during the 1967 NCAA University Division football season. Columbia finished last in the Ivy League.

In their eleventh and final season under head coach Aldo "Buff" Donelli, the Lions compiled a 2–7 record and were outscored 205 to 109. Donald Hubert and Thomas Reed were the team captains.

The Lions were winless (0–7) in conference play, finishing last in the Ivy League standings. Columbia was outscored 178 to 68 by Ivy opponents.

Columbia played its home games at Baker Field in Upper Manhattan, in New York City.

== Schedule ==
Date	Opponent	Site	Result	Attendance	Source
September 30	Colgate*	Baker Field; New York, NY	W 17–14	11,000	
October 7	Princeton	Baker Field; New York, NY	L 14–28	16,382	
October 14	at Harvard	Harvard Stadium; Boston, MA	L 13–49	14,000	
October 21	Yale^{†}	Baker Field; New York, NY	L 7–21	22,000	
October 28	Rutgers*	Baker Field; New York, NY	W 24–13	10,000	
November 4	at Cornell	Schoellkopf Field; Ithaca, NY (rivalry)	L 14–27	13,000	
November 11	Dartmouth	Baker Field; New York, NY	L 7–13	10,000	
November 18	at Penn	Franklin Field; Philadelphia, PA	L 6–26	9,145	
November 25	at Brown	Brown Stadium; Providence, RI	L 7–14	5,300	
*Non-conference game; ^{†}Homecoming
