= 1962 Columbia Lions football team =

American college football season

1962 Columbia Lions football
- Conference: Ivy League
- Record: 5–4 (4–3 Ivy)
- Head coach: Aldo Donelli (6th season)
- Captain: Thomas E. O’Connor Jr.
- Home stadium: Baker Field

1962 Ivy League football standings
	Conf.					Overall
Team	W		L		T	W		L		T
Dartmouth $	7	–	0	–	0	9	–	0	–	0
Harvard	5	–	2	–	0	6	–	3	–	0
Columbia	4	–	3	–	0	5	–	4	–	0
Princeton	4	–	3	–	0	5	–	4	–	0
Cornell	4	–	3	–	0	4	–	5	–	0
Penn	2	–	5	–	0	3	–	6	–	0
Yale	1	–	5	–	1	2	–	5	–	2
Brown	0	–	6	–	1	1	–	6	–	2
$ – Conference champion

The 1962 Columbia Lions football team was an American football team that represented Columbia University during the 1962 NCAA University Division football season. Columbia tied for third in the Ivy League.

In their sixth season under head coach Aldo "Buff" Donelli, the Lions compiled a 5–4 record but were outscored 206 to 124. Thomas E. O’Connor Jr. was the team captain.

The Lions' 2–3 conference record tied for third in the Ivy League standings. Columbia was outscored 169 to 96 by Ivy opponents.

Columbia played its home games at Baker Field in Upper Manhattan, in New York City.

== Schedule ==
Date	Opponent	Site	Result	Attendance	Source
September 29	Brown	Baker Field; New York, NY	W 22–20	8,277	
October 6	at Princeton	Palmer Stadium; Princeton, NJ	L 0–33	14,000	
October 13	Yale^{†}	Baker Field; New York, NY	W 14–10	24,200	
October 20	Harvard	Baker Field; New York, NY	L 14–36	18,500	
October 27	Lehigh*	Baker Field; New York, NY	W 22–15	6,500–8,275	
November 3	Cornell	Baker Field; New York, NY (rivalry)	W 25–21	4,450	
November 10	at Dartmouth	Memorial Field; Hanover, NH	L 0–42	8,500	
November 17	at Penn	Franklin Field; Philadelphia, PA	W 21–7	8,649	
November 24	Rutgers*	Baker Field; New York, NY	L 6–22	15,225	
*Non-conference game; ^{†}Homecoming
