= 1967 Princeton Tigers football team =

American college football season

1967 Princeton Tigers football
- Conference: Ivy League
- Record: 6–3 (4–3 Ivy)
- Head coach: Dick Colman (11th season)
- Captain: Elam M. (Lee) Hitchner III
- Home stadium: Palmer Stadium

1967 Ivy League football standings
	Conf.					Overall
Team	W		L		T	W		L		T
Yale $	7	–	0	–	0	8	–	1	–	0
Dartmouth	5	–	2	–	0	7	–	2	–	0
Cornell	4	–	2	–	1	6	–	2	–	1
Harvard	4	–	3	–	0	6	–	3	–	0
Princeton	4	–	3	–	0	6	–	3	–	0
Penn	2	–	5	–	0	3	–	6	–	0
Brown	1	–	5	–	1	2	–	6	–	1
Columbia	0	–	7	–	0	2	–	7	–	0
$ – Conference champion

The 1967 Princeton Tigers football team was an American football team that represented Princeton University, during the 1967 NCAA University Division football season. After gaining a share of the Ivy League crown the previous year, Princeton fell to a fourth-place tie in 1967.

In their eleventh year under head coach Dick Colman, the Tigers compiled a 6–3 record and outscored their opponents, the score being, 233 to 162. Elam M. (Lee) Hitchner III was the team captain.

Princeton's 4–3 conference record tied for fourth place in the Ivy League standings. The Tigers outscored Ivy opponents 183 to 141.

Princeton played its home games at Palmer Stadium on the university campus in Princeton, New Jersey.

== Schedule ==
Date	Opponent	Site	Result	Attendance	Source
September 30	Rutgers*	Palmer Stadium; Princeton, NJ (rivalry)	W 22–21	41,000	
October 7	at Columbia	Baker Field; New York, NY	W 28–14	16,382	
October 14	at Cornell	Schoellkopf Field; Ithaca, NY	L 13–47	21,000	
October 21	Colgate*	Palmer Stadium; Princeton, NJ	W 28–0	22,000	
October 28	Penn	Palmer Stadium; Princeton, NJ (rivalry)	W 28–14	22,000	
November 4	Brown	Palmer Stadium; Princeton, NJ	W 48–14	10,000	
November 11	at Harvard	Harvard Stadium; Boston, MA (rivalry)	W 45–6	35,000	
November 18	Yale	Palmer Stadium; Princeton, NJ (rivalry)	L 7–29	43,000	
November 25	Dartmouth	Palmer Stadium; Princeton, NJ	L 14–17	31,000	
*Non-conference game
