= 1967 Cornell Big Red football team =

American college football season

1967 Cornell Big Red football
- Conference: Ivy League
- Record: 6–2–1 (4–2–1 Ivy)
- Head coach: Jack Musick (2nd season)
- Captain: Ron Kopicki
- Home stadium: Schoellkopf Field

1967 Ivy League football standings
	Conf.					Overall
Team	W		L		T	W		L		T
Yale $	7	–	0	–	0	8	–	1	–	0
Dartmouth	5	–	2	–	0	7	–	2	–	0
Cornell	4	–	2	–	1	6	–	2	–	1
Harvard	4	–	3	–	0	6	–	3	–	0
Princeton	4	–	3	–	0	6	–	3	–	0
Penn	2	–	5	–	0	3	–	6	–	0
Brown	1	–	5	–	1	2	–	6	–	1
Columbia	0	–	7	–	0	2	–	7	–	0
$ – Conference champion

The 1967 Cornell Big Red football team was an American football team that represented Cornell University during the 1967 NCAA University Division football season. Cornell finished third in the Ivy League .

In its second season under head coach Jack Musick, the team compiled a 6–2–1 record and outscored opponents 210 to 145. Ron Kopicki was the team captain.

Cornell's 4–2–1 conference record placed third in the Ivy League standings. The Big Red outscored Ivy opponents 164 to 131.

Cornell played its home games at Schoellkopf Field in Ithaca, New York.

== Schedule ==
Date	Opponent	Site	Result	Attendance	Source
September 30	Bucknell*	Schoellkopf Field; Ithaca, NY	W 23–7	12,000–16,800	
October 7	at Colgate*	Colgate Athletic Field; Hamilton, NY (rivalry)	W 23–7	13,859	
October 14	Princeton	Schoellkopf Field; Ithaca, NY	W 47–13	21,000	
October 21	Harvard	Schoellkopf Field; Ithaca, NY	L 12–14	20,000	
October 28	at Yale	Yale Bowl; New Haven, CT	L 7–41	35,081	
November 4	Columbia	Schoellkopf Field; Ithaca, NY (rivalry)	W 27–14	13,000	
November 11	Brown	Schoellkopf Field; Ithaca, NY	T 14–14	10,000	
November 18	at Dartmouth	Memorial Field; Hanover, NH (rivalry)	W 24–21	12,569	
November 25	at Penn	Franklin Field; Philadelphia, PA (rivalry)	W 33–14	8,906	
*Non-conference game
