= 1969 Harvard Crimson football team =

American college football season

1969 Harvard Crimson football
- Conference: Ivy League
- Record: 3–6 (2–5 Ivy)
- Head coach: John Yovicsin (13th season)
- Captain: John F. Cramer
- Home stadium: Harvard Stadium

1969 Ivy League football standings
	Conf.					Overall
Team	W		L		T	W		L		T
Dartmouth +	6	–	1	–	0	8	–	1	–	0
Yale +	6	–	1	–	0	7	–	2	–	0
Princeton +	6	–	1	–	0	6	–	3	–	0
Cornell	4	–	3	–	0	4	–	5	–	0
Penn	2	–	5	–	0	4	–	5	–	0
Harvard	2	–	5	–	0	3	–	6	–	0
Brown	1	–	6	–	0	2	–	7	–	0
Columbia	1	–	6	–	0	1	–	8	–	0
+ – Conference co-champions

The 1969 Harvard Crimson football team was an American football team that represented Harvard University during the 1969 NCAA University Division football season. After gaining a share of the Ivy League crown the previous year, Harvard fell to a fifth-place tie in 1969.

In their 13th year under head coach John Yovicsin, the Crimson compiled a 3–6 record and were outscored 166 to 165. John F. Cramer was the team captain.

Harvard's 2–5 conference record tied for fifth-best in the Ivy League standings. The Crimson were outscored 153 to 142 by Ivy opponents.

Harvard played its home games at Harvard Stadium in the Allston neighborhood of Boston, Massachusetts.

== Schedule ==
Date	Opponent	Site	Result	Attendance	Source
September 27	Holy Cross*	Harvard Stadium; Boston, MA	W 13–0	25,000	
October 4	Boston University*	Harvard Stadium; Boston, MA	L 10–13	26,000	
October 11	Columbia	Harvard Stadium; Boston, MA	W 51–0	15,000	
October 18	at Cornell	Schoellkopf Field; Ithaca, NY	L 24–41	14,000	
October 25	Dartmouth	Harvard Stadium; Boston, MA (rivalry)	L 10–24	40,000	
November 1	at Penn	Franklin Field; Philadelphia, PA (rivalry)	W 20–6	30,943	
November 8	Princeton	Harvard Stadium; Boston, MA (rivalry)	L 20–51	28,000	
November 15	at Brown	Brown Stadium; Providence, RI	L 17–24	15,900	
November 22	at Yale	Yale Bowl; New Haven, CT (The Game)	L 0–7	62,562	
*Non-conference game
