= Mike Cooley (American football) =

American football player and coach

- Cooley pictured in Epitome 1965, Lehigh yearbook

Biographical details
- Born: c. 1927
- Died: June 13, 1988 (aged 60); Atlanta, Georgia, U.S.

Playing career
- 1944–1947: Georgia
- Position: Center

Coaching career (HC unless noted)
- 1950–1961: Lehigh (line)
- 1962–1964: Lehigh

Head coaching record
- Overall: 5–21–1

Michael T. Cooley (c. 1927 – June 13, 1988) was an American college football player and coach. He served as the head football coach at Lehigh University from 1962 to 1964, compiling a record of 5–21–1. Cooley played college football at the University of Georgia from 1944 to 1947 under Wally Butts. He graduated from Georgia in 1948. Cooley died at the age of 60 on June 13, 1988, at Emory University Hospital in Atlanta.

== Head coaching record ==
Year	Team	Overall	Conference	Standing	Bowl/playoffs
Lehigh Engineers (Middle Atlantic Conference) (1962–1964)
1962	Lehigh	3–6	2–2	3rd (University)	
1963	Lehigh	1–8	1–3	5th (University)	
1964	Lehigh	1–7–1	0–3–1	T–6th (University)	
Lehigh:		5–21–1	3–8–1		
Total:		5–21–1			
