= 1962 Yale Bulldogs football team =

American college football season

1962 Yale Bulldogs football
- Conference: Ivy League
- Record: 2–5–2 (1–5–1 Ivy)
- Head coach: Jordan Olivar (11th season)
- Captain: Henry Higdon
- Home stadium: Yale Bowl

1962 Ivy League football standings
| | Conf. | | | | | Overall |
| Team | W | | L | | T | W | | L | | T |
|---|---|---|---|---|---|---|---|---|---|---|
| Dartmouth $ | 7 | – | 0 | – | 0 | 9 | – | 0 | – | 0 |
| Harvard | 5 | – | 2 | – | 0 | 6 | – | 3 | – | 0 |
| Columbia | 4 | – | 3 | – | 0 | 5 | – | 4 | – | 0 |
| Princeton | 4 | – | 3 | – | 0 | 5 | – | 4 | – | 0 |
| Cornell | 4 | – | 3 | – | 0 | 4 | – | 5 | – | 0 |
| Penn | 2 | – | 5 | – | 0 | 3 | – | 6 | – | 0 |
| Yale | 1 | – | 5 | – | 1 | 2 | – | 5 | – | 2 |
| Brown | 0 | – | 6 | – | 1 | 1 | – | 6 | – | 2 |
$ – Conference champion

The 1962 Yale Bulldogs football team represented Yale University in the 1962 NCAA University Division football season. The Bulldogs were led by 11th-year head coach Jordan Olivar, played their home games at the Yale Bowl and finished seventh in the Ivy League with a 1–5–1 record, 2–5–2 overall.

== Schedule ==
| Date | Opponent | Site | Result | Attendance | Source |
|---|---|---|---|---|---|
| September 29 | Connecticut* | Yale Bowl; New Haven, CT | W 18–14 | 37,636 | |
| October 6 | at Brown | Brown Stadium; Providence, RI | T 6–6 | 8,000 | |
| October 13 | at Columbia | Baker Field; New York, NY | L 10–14 | 24,200 | |
| October 20 | Cornell | Yale Bowl; New Haven, CT | W 26–8 | 25,541 | |
| October 27 | Colgate* | Yale Bowl; New Haven, CT | T 14–14 | 28,232 | |
| November 3 | Dartmouth | Yale Bowl; New Haven, CT | L 0–9 | 26,522 | |
| November 10 | Penn | Yale Bowl; New Haven, CT | L 12–15 | 14,176 | |
| November 17 | Princeton | Yale Bowl; New Haven, CT (rivalry) | L 10–14 | 39,300 | |
| November 24 | at Harvard | Harvard Stadium; Boston, MA (The Game) | L 6–14 | 39,000 | |
*Non-conference game
