= Jordan Olivar =

American football player and coach (1915–1990)

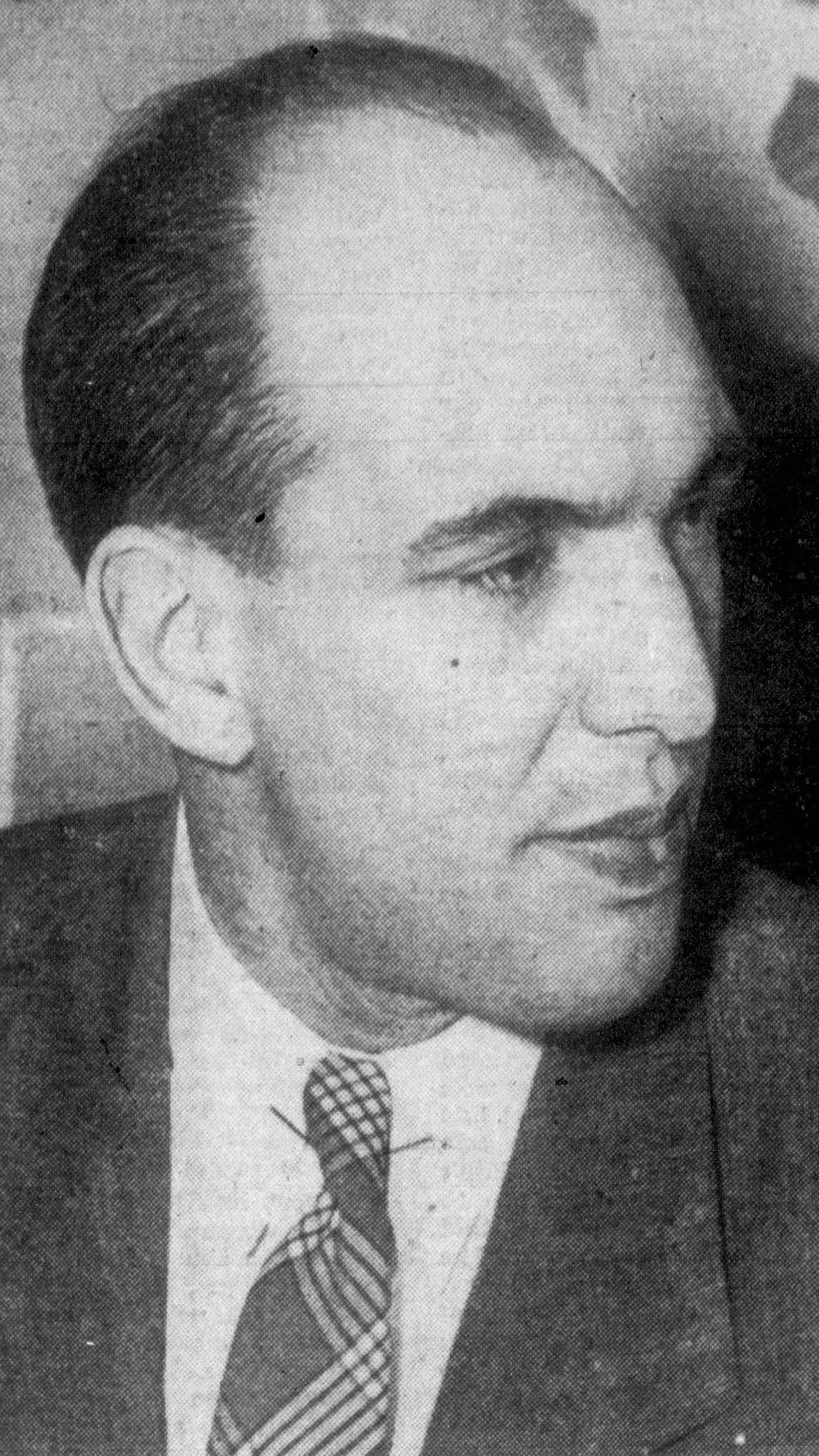
- Olivar, circa 1949

Biographical details
- Born: January 30, 1915; Brooklyn, New York, U.S.
- Died: October 17, 1990 (aged 75); Inglewood, California, U.S.

Playing career

Football
- 1935–1937: Villanova
- Position: Tackle

Coaching career (HC unless noted)

Football
- 1942: Roman Catholic HS (PA)
- 1943–1948: Villanova
- 1949–1951: Loyola (CA)
- 1952–1962: Yale

Basketball
- 1942–1943: Roman Catholic HS (PA)

Head coaching record
- Overall: 111–63–8 (college football)
- Bowls: 1–1

Accomplishments and honors

Championships
- 2 Ivy (1956, 1960)

Jordan A. Olivar (January 30, 1915 – October 17, 1990) was an American football player and coach. He served as the head football coach at Villanova College—now known as Villanova University—from 1943 to 1948, at Loyola University of Los Angeles—now known as Loyola Marymount University—from 1949 to 1951, and at Yale University from 1952 to 1962, compiling an overall record of 111–63–8. Olivar led the Yale Bulldogs to two Ivy League championships, in 1956 and 1960. The 1960 Yale team finished the season ranked 14 in the AP Poll, which is the most recent year end poll in which Yale has been within the top 25. He died of lung cancer on October 17, 1990, at his home in Inglewood, California.

== Head coaching record ==
=== College football ===
Year	Team	Overall	Conference	Standing	Bowl/playoffs	Coaches^{#}	AP^{°}
Villanova Wildcats (Independent) (1943–1948)
1943	Villanova	5–3					
1944	Villanova	4–4					
1945	Villanova	4–4					
1946	Villanova	6–4					
1947	Villanova	6–3–1			L Great Lakes		
1948	Villanova	8–2–1			W Harbor		
Villanova:		33–20–2					
Loyola Lions (Independent) (1949–1951)
1949	Loyola	6–4					
1950	Loyola	8–1					
1951	Loyola	3–6					
Loyola:		17–11					
Yale Bulldogs (Independent) (1952–1955)
1952	Yale	7–2					
1953	Yale	5–2–2					
1954	Yale	5–3–1					
1955	Yale	7–2					
Yale Bulldogs (Ivy League) (1956–1962)
1956	Yale	8–1	7–0	1st		17	
1957	Yale	6–2–1	4–2–1	3rd			
1958	Yale	2–7	0–7	8th			
1959	Yale	6–3	4–3	T–3rd			
1960	Yale	9–0	7–0	1st		18	14
1961	Yale	4–5	3–4	5th			
1962	Yale	2–5–2	1–5–1	7th			
Yale:		61–32–6	26–21–2				
Total:		111–63–8					
National championship Conference title Conference division title or championship game berth
^{#}Rankings from final Coaches Poll.; ^{°}Rankings from final AP Poll.
