= 1967 Yale Bulldogs football team =

American college football season

1967 Yale Bulldogs football

Ivy League champion
- Conference: Ivy League
- Record: 8–1 (7–0 Ivy)
- Head coach: Carmen Cozza (3rd season)
- Home stadium: Yale Bowl

1967 Ivy League football standings
	Conf.					Overall
Team	W		L		T	W		L		T
Yale $	7	–	0	–	0	8	–	1	–	0
Dartmouth	5	–	2	–	0	7	–	2	–	0
Cornell	4	–	2	–	1	6	–	2	–	1
Harvard	4	–	3	–	0	6	–	3	–	0
Princeton	4	–	3	–	0	6	–	3	–	0
Penn	2	–	5	–	0	3	–	6	–	0
Brown	1	–	5	–	1	2	–	6	–	1
Columbia	0	–	7	–	0	2	–	7	–	0
$ – Conference champion

The 1967 Yale Bulldogs football team represented Yale University in the 1967 NCAA University Division football season. The Bulldogs were led by third-year head coach Carmen Cozza, played their home games at the Yale Bowl and finished first in the Ivy League with a 7–0 record, 8–1 overall.

== Schedule ==
Date	Opponent	Site	Result	Attendance	Source
September 30	Holy Cross*	Yale Bowl; New Haven, CT	L 14–26	31,749	
October 7	Connecticut*	Yale Bowl; New Haven, CT	W 14–6	31,621	
October 14	at Brown	Brown Stadium; Providence, RI	W 35–0	8,900	
October 21	at Columbia	Baker Field; New York, NY	W 21–7	22,000	
October 28	Cornell	Yale Bowl; New Haven, CT	W 41–7	35,081	
November 4	Dartmouth	Yale Bowl; New Haven, CT	W 56–15	49,362	
November 11	Penn	Yale Bowl; New Haven, CT	W 44–22	31,740	
November 18	at Princeton	Palmer Stadium; Princeton, NJ (rivalry)	W 29–7	43,000	
November 25	Harvard	Yale Bowl; New Haven, CT (The Game)	W 24–20	68,135	
*Non-conference game
