= James S. Lentz =

American football coach (1927–2009)

Biographical details
- Born: April 5, 1927; Drexel Hill, Pennsylvania, U.S.
- Died: July 22, 2009 (aged 82); Brunswick, Maine, U.S.
- Education: Gettysburg College (1951); Columbia University (1957)

Playing career

Football
- 1947–1950: Gettysburg

Wrestling
- 1947–1950: Gettysburg
- Position: Tackle (football)

Coaching career (HC unless noted)

Football
- 1951: Gettysburg (assistant)
- 1952–1955: Gettysburg (freshman)
- 1956: Gettysburg (line)
- 1957–1961: Harvard (OG/C)
- 1962–1967: Harvard (DC/DL)
- 1968–1983: Bowdoin

Swimming
- 1952–1956?: Gettysburg

Lacrosse
- 1957–1967: Harvard (freshman)
- 1968: Bowdoin
- 1969–?: Bowdoin (JV)

Head coaching record
- Overall: 55–66 (football)

Accomplishments and honors

Championships
- Football; 5 MIAA (1968–1971, 1973)

James Spencer Lentz (April 5, 1927 – July 22, 2009) was an American college football coach. He was the head football coach for Bowdoin College from 1968 to 1983.

== Playing career ==
Lentz played college football as a tackle at Gettysburg. During a game in his freshman season, he suffered a broken hand. He also competed in wrestling.

== Coaching career ==
Following Lentz's graduation, he served as an assistant coach in 1951 for his alma mater, Gettysburg. In 1952, he was promoted to a full-time position and was the freshman coach. In 1952, his freshman team finished the season undefeated. In 1956, he served as the line coach. In 1957, he was hired on the inaugural staff for newly hired Harvard head coach John Yovicsin as the offensive guard and centers coach. In 1962, he was promoted to defensive coordinator and defensive line coach. In 1968, Lentz was hired as the head football coach for Bowdoin. He served as the head coach for sixteen years, amassed an overall record of 55–66, and won ten Colby-Bates-Bowdoin Consortiums. He resigned following the 1983 season.

From 1952 until the late 1950s, Lentz was the swimming coach for Gettysburg. He was also the freshman lacrosse coach for Harvard from 1957 to 1967. He served one year as the head lacrosse coach for Bowdoin before becoming the junior varsity coach for a number of years.

== Personal life, military career, and death ==
From 1945 to 1947, Lentz served in the United States Army and was stationed in Austria.

Lentz was a member of the Phi Gamma Delta.

Lentz died on July 22, 2009, in Brunswick, Maine.

== Head coaching record ==
=== Football ===
Year	Team	Overall	Conference	Standing	Bowl/playoffs
Bowdoin Polar Bears (Maine Intercollegiate Athletic Association) (1968–1973)
1968	Bowdoin	2–5	2–0	1st	
1969	Bowdoin	3–4	2–0	1st	
1970	Bowdoin	6–1	2–0	1st	
1971	Bowdoin	3–4	2–0	1st	
1972	Bowdoin	2–5	1–1	2nd	
1973	Bowdoin	4–3	2–0	1st	
Bowdoin Polar Bears (New England Small College Athletic Conference) (1974–1983)
1974	Bowdoin	3–4			
1975	Bowdoin	4–3			
1976	Bowdoin	4–4			
1977	Bowdoin	4–4			
1978	Bowdoin	3–5			
1979	Bowdoin	5–3			
1980	Bowdoin	5–3			
1981	Bowdoin	2–6			
1982	Bowdoin	4–4			
1983	Bowdoin	1–7			
Bowdoin:		55–66			
Total:		55–66			
National championship Conference title Conference division title or championship game berth
