= 1969 Yale Bulldogs football team =

American college football season

1969 Yale Bulldogs football

Ivy League co-champion
- Conference: Ivy League
- Record: 7–2 (6–1 Ivy)
- Head coach: Carmen Cozza (5th season)
- Home stadium: Yale Bowl

1969 Ivy League football standings
	Conf.					Overall
Team	W		L		T	W		L		T
Dartmouth +	6	–	1	–	0	8	–	1	–	0
Yale +	6	–	1	–	0	7	–	2	–	0
Princeton +	6	–	1	–	0	6	–	3	–	0
Cornell	4	–	3	–	0	4	–	5	–	0
Penn	2	–	5	–	0	4	–	5	–	0
Harvard	2	–	5	–	0	3	–	6	–	0
Brown	1	–	6	–	0	2	–	7	–	0
Columbia	1	–	6	–	0	1	–	8	–	0
+ – Conference co-champions

The 1969 Yale Bulldogs football team represented Yale University in the 1969 NCAA University Division football season. The Bulldogs were led by fifth-year head coach Carmen Cozza, played their home games at the Yale Bowl and finished tied for first in the Ivy League with a 6–1 record, 7–2 overall.

== Schedule ==
Date	Opponent	Site	Result	Attendance	Source
September 27	Connecticut*	Yale Bowl; New Haven, CT	L 15–19	36,421	
October 4	Colgate*	Yale Bowl; New Haven, CT	W 40–21	23,727	
October 11	at Brown	Brown Stadium; Providence, RI	W 27–13	16,800	
October 18	at Columbia	Baker Field; New York, NY	W 41–6	15,114	
October 25	Cornell	Yale Bowl; New Haven, CT	W 17–0	32,151	
November 1	Dartmouth	Yale Bowl; New Haven, CT	L 21–42	49,958	
November 8	Penn	Yale Bowl; New Haven, CT	W 21–3	33,545	
November 15	at Princeton	Palmer Stadium; Princeton, NJ (rivalry)	W 17–14	35,000	
November 22	Harvard	Yale Bowl; New Haven, CT (The Game)	W 7–0	62,562	
*Non-conference game
