= 1968 NFL/AFL draft =

National Football League draft

General information
- Date: January 30–31, 1968
- Location: Belmont Plaza Hotel in New York City, New York

Overview
- 462 total selections in 17 rounds
- League: NFL, AFL
- First selection: Ron Yary, OT; Minnesota Vikings
- Most selections (41): Cincinnati Bengals
- Fewest selections (11): New York Giants
- Hall of Famers: 8: OT Ron Yary; DE Claude Humphrey; RB Larry Csonka; DT Curley Culp; QB Ken Stabler; TE Charlie Sanders; DE Elvin Bethea; OT Art Shell

The 1968 NFL/AFL draft was part of the common draft, in the second year in which the NFL and AFL held a joint draft of college players. It took place at the Belmont Plaza Hotel in New York City on January 30–31, 1968.

The Minnesota Vikings acquired the first overall pick in the draft through a trade with the New York Giants in March 1967 for quarterback Fran Tarkenton. When establishing the common draft between the NFL and AFL, the Giants were able to negotiate that they would receive the option to pick first in either the 1967 or 1968 NFL/AFL drafts, regardless of the presence of an expansion team or their own record from the previous season. They traded this "special wild card" pick in the Tarkenton trade, and the Vikings chose to exercise it in 1968. The expansion Cincinnati Bengals picked second. The Vikings used the first overall pick to select offensive tackle Ron Yary.

This was the last draft until 1980 in which the Washington Redskins exercised their first-round pick. Most of them were traded away by coach George Allen between 1971 and 1977 due to Allen's well-known preference for veteran players over rookies.

== Player selections ==
= Pro Bowler	= AFL All-Star	= Hall of Famer

=== Round 1 ===
Pick #	NFL team	Player	Position	College
1	Minnesota Vikings NFL	Ron Yary	Offensive tackle	USC
2	Cincinnati Bengals AFL	Bob Johnson	Center	Tennessee
3	Atlanta Falcons NFL	Claude Humphrey	Defensive end	Tennessee State
4	San Diego Chargers AFL	Russ Washington	Offensive tackle	Missouri
5	Green Bay Packers NFL	Fred Carr	Linebacker	UTEP
6	Boston Patriots AFL	Dennis Byrd	Defensive tackle	North Carolina State
7	New Orleans Saints NFL	Kevin Hardy	Defensive end	Notre Dame
8	Miami Dolphins AFL	Larry Csonka	Fullback	Syracuse
9	Buffalo Bills AFL	Haven Moses	Wide Receiver	San Diego State
10	Pittsburgh Steelers NFL	Mike Taylor	Offensive tackle	USC
11	Detroit Lions NFL	Greg Landry	Quarterback	UMass
12	Washington Redskins NFL	Jim Smith	Defensive back	Oregon
13	St. Louis Cardinals NFL	MacArthur Lane	Running back	Utah State
14	Philadelphia Eagles NFL	Tim Rossovich	Linebacker	USC
15	San Francisco 49ers NFL	Forrest Blue	Center	Auburn
16	Chicago Bears NFL	Mike Hull	Running back	USC
17	New York Jets AFL	Lee White	Running back	Weber State
18	San Diego Chargers AFL	Jim Hill	Defensive back	Texas A&M Kingsville
19	Kansas City Chiefs AFL	Mo Moorman	Offensive guard	Texas A&M
20	Dallas Cowboys NFL	Dennis Homan	Wide receiver	Alabama
21	Cleveland Browns NFL	Marvin Upshaw	Defensive end	Trinity
22	Kansas City Chiefs AFL	George Daney	Offensive guard	UTEP
23	Baltimore Colts NFL	John Williams	Offensive tackle	Minnesota
24	Detroit Lions NFL	Earl McCullouch	Wide receiver	USC
25	Oakland Raiders AFL	Eldridge Dickey	Quarterback	Tennessee State
26	Green Bay Packers NFL	Bill Lueck	Offensive guard	Arizona
27	Miami Dolphins AFL	Doug Crusan	Offensive tackle	Indiana

=== Round 2 ===
Pick #	NFL team	Player	Position	College
28	Cincinnati Bengals	Bill Staley	Defensive end	Utah State
29	Atlanta Falcons	Carlton Dabney	Defensive end	Morgan State
30	Los Angeles Rams	Gary Beban	Quarterback	UCLA
31	Denver Broncos	Curley Culp	Defensive end	Arizona State
32	Boston Patriots	Tom Funchess	Tackle	Jackson State
33	Minnesota Vikings	Charlie West	Defensive back	Texas–El Paso
34	Buffalo Bills	Bob Tatarek	Defensive tackle	Miami (FL)
35	Miami Dolphins	Jimmy Keyes	Kicker/Linebacker	Mississippi
36	Pittsburgh Steelers	Ernie Ruple	Tackle	Arkansas
37	Detroit Lions	Jerry DePoyster	Kicker	Wyoming
38	Washington Redskins	Tom Roussel	Linebacker	Southern Mississippi
39	Philadelphia Eagles	Cyril Pinder	Running back	Illinois
40	St. Louis Cardinals	Fred Hyatt	Wide receiver	Auburn
41	New York Giants	Rich Buzin	Tackle	Penn State
42	St. Louis Cardinals	Bob Atkins	Defensive back	Grambling
43	San Diego Chargers	Bill Lenkaitis	Center	Penn State
44	New York Jets	Steve Thompson	Defensive end	Washington
45	Dallas Cowboys	Dave McDaniels	Wide receiver	Mississippi Valley State
46	Chicago Bears	Bob Wallace	Wide receiver	Texas–El Paso
47	Cleveland Browns	John Garlington	Linebacker	LSU
48	Kansas City Chiefs	Mike Livingston	Quarterback	Southern Methodist
49	Houston Oilers	Mac Haik	Wide receiver	Mississippi
50	Baltimore Colts	Bob Grant	Linebacker	Wake Forest
51	Los Angeles Rams	Mike LaHood	Guard	Wyoming
52	Oakland Raiders	Ken Stabler	Quarterback	Alabama
53	Atlanta Falcons	John Wright	Wide receiver	Illinois
54	Miami Dolphins	Jim Cox	Wide receiver	Miami (FL)
55	Cincinnati Bengals	Tom Smiley	Running back	Lamar

=== Round 3 ===
Pick #	NFL team	Player	Position	College
56	Cincinnati Bengals	Gary Davis	Quarterback	Vanderbilt
57	Chicago Bears	Major Hazelton	Defensive back	Florida A&M
58	Denver Broncos	Garrett Ford	Running back	West Virginia
59	New Orleans Saints	Dave Szymakowski	Wide receiver	West Texas State
60	Boston Patriots	Aaron Marsh	Wide receiver	Eastern Kentucky
61	Pittsburgh Steelers	Jon Henderson	Defensive back	Colorado State
62	Miami Dolphins	Jim Urbanek	Defensive tackle	Mississippi
63	Buffalo Bills	Richard Trapp	End	Florida
64	Cleveland Browns	Harry Olszewski	Guard	Clemson
65	San Francisco 49ers	Lance Olssen	Tackle	Purdue
66	Cleveland Browns	Reece Morrison	Running back	Southwest Texas State
67	Green Bay Packers	Billy Stevens	Quarterback	Texas–El Paso
68	Philadelphia Eagles	Adrian Young	Linebacker	USC
69	San Francisco 49ers	Skip Vanderbundt	Linebacker	Oregon State
70	New York Giants	Bobby Duhon	Running back	Tulane
71	Dallas Cowboys	Ed Harmon	Linebacker	Louisville
72	New York Jets	Sam Walton	Tackle	East Texas State
73	Miami Dolphins	Dick Anderson	Defensive back	Colorado
74	Detroit Lions	Charlie Sanders	Tight end	Minnesota
75	Denver Broncos	Bob Vaughn	Offensive tackle	Mississippi
76	Minnesota Vikings	Mike McGill	Linebacker	Notre Dame
77	Houston Oilers	Elvin Bethea	Defensive end	North Carolina A&T
78	Baltimore Colts	Rich O'Hara	Wide receiver	Northern Arizona
79	Pittsburgh Steelers	Ken Hebert	Wide receiver	Houston
80	Oakland Raiders	Art Shell	Tackle	Maryland-Eastern Shore
81	Green Bay Packers	Dick Himes	Tackle	Ohio State
82	Cincinnati Bengals	Paul Robinson	Running back	Arizona
83	Cincinnati Bengals	Dale Livingston	Kicker	Western Michigan

=== Round 4 ===
Pick #	NFL team	Player	Position	College
84	Cincinnati Bengals	Jess Phillips	Defensive back	Michigan State
85	St. Louis Cardinals	Don Fitzgerald	Running back	Kent State
86	New Orleans Saints	Willie Crittendon	Defensive tackle	Tulsa
87	Buffalo Bills	Edgar Chandler	Tackle	Georgia
88	Boston Patriots	R. C. Gamble	Running back	South Carolina State
89	Minnesota Vikings	Mike Freeman	Defensive back	Fresno State
90	Kansas City Chiefs	Mickey McCarty	Tight end	Texas Christian
91	Denver Broncos	Gordon Lambert	Linebacker	Tennessee-Martin
92	Green Bay Packers	Brendan McCarthy	Running back	Boston College
93	Detroit Lions	Ed Mooney	Linebacker	Texas Tech
94	Washington Redskins	Dennis Crane	Defensive tackle	USC
95	Philadelphia Eagles	Len McNeil	Guard	Fresno State
96	St. Louis Cardinals	Joe Schmiesing	Linebacker	New Mexico State
97	Dallas Cowboys	John Douglas	Linebacker	Missouri
98	San Francisco 49ers	Johnny Fuller	Wide receiver	Lamar
99	Chicago Bears	Wayne Mass	Tackle	Clemson
100	San Diego Chargers	Ken Dyer	Wide receiver	Arizona State
101	New York Jets	Gary Magner	Defensive tackle	USC
102	Denver Broncos	Drake Garrett	Defensive back	Michigan State
103	New Orleans Saints	Dan Sartin	Tackle	Mississippi
104	Cleveland Browns	Wayne Meylan	Linebacker	Nebraska
105	Houston Oilers	Jim Beirne	Wide receiver	Purdue
106	Chicago Bears	Alan Bush	Guard	Mississippi
107	Baltimore Colts	Jim Duncan	Running back	Maryland-Eastern Shore
108	Green Bay Packers	John Robinson	Wide receiver	Tennessee State
109	Cincinnati Bengals	Warren McVea	Running back	Houston
110	Oakland Raiders	Charlie Smith	Running back	Utah
111	Denver Broncos	Gus Hollomon	Defensive back	Houston

=== Round 5 ===
Pick #	NFL team	Player	Position	College
112	Cincinnati Bengals	Dave Middendorf	Guard	Washington State
113	Washington Redskins	Ken Barefoot	Tight end	Virginia Tech
114	Buffalo Bills	Ben Gregory	Running back	Nebraska
115	New Orleans Saints	Ronnie Lee South	Quarterback	Arkansas
116	Boston Patriots	Jim Smithberger	Defensive back	Notre Dame
117	Washington Redskins	Mike Bragg	Kicker	Richmond
118	Miami Dolphins	Jim Kiick	Running back	Wyoming
119	Buffalo Bills	Mike McBath	Defensive end	Penn State
120	Detroit Lions	Phil Odle	Wide receiver	Brigham Young
121	Green Bay Packers	Steve Duich	Tackle	San Diego State
122	Philadelphia Eagles	Mike Dirks	Tackle	Wyoming
123	St. Louis Cardinals	Rocky Rosema	Linebacker	Michigan
124	Philadelphia Eagles	Mark Nordquist	Tackle	Pacific
125	San Francisco 49ers	Dwight Lee	Running back	Michigan State
126	Baltimore Colts	Paul Elzey	Linebacker	Toledo
127	Chicago Bears	Cecil Turner	Wide receiver	Cal Poly-San Luis Obispo
128	New York Jets	Lee Jacobsen	Linebacker	Kearney State
129	San Diego Chargers	Bill Perry	Tight end	Kent State
130	Dallas Cowboys	Blaine Nye	Tackle	Stanford
131	Cleveland Browns	Mike Wempe	Tackle	Missouri
132	Buffalo Bills	Max Anderson	Running back	Arizona State
133	Houston Oilers	Bob Longo	Wide receiver	Pittsburgh
134	Cleveland Browns	Jackie Jackson	Running back	Clemson
135	Los Angeles Rams	Don Martin	Kicker	Washington
136	Oakland Raiders	John Naponic	Tackle	Virginia
137	Green Bay Packers	Francis Winkler	Defensive end	Memphis State
138	Cincinnati Bengals	Al Beauchamp	Linebacker	Southern

=== Round 6 ===
Pick #	NFL team	Player	Position	College
139	Cincinnati Bengals	Howard Fest	Tackle	Texas
140	Atlanta Falcons	Jim Hagle	Running back	Southern Methodist
141	San Francisco 49ers	Leo Johnson	Wide receiver	Tennessee State
142	Miami Dolphins	Kim Hammond	Quarterback	Florida State
143	Cincinnati Bengals	Bill Kindricks	Tackle	Alabama A&M
144	Minnesota Vikings	Bob Goodridge	Wide receiver	Vanderbilt
145	Cincinnati Bengals	John Neidert	Linebacker	Louisville
146	Miami Dolphins	Jimmy Hines	Wide receiver	Texas Southern
147	Atlanta Falcons	Joe Wynns	Defensive back	South Carolina State
148	Detroit Lions	Mike Spitzer	Defensive end	San Jose State
149	Washington Redskins	Willie Banks	Guard	Alcorn State
150	Philadelphia Eagles	Thurman Randle	Tackle	Texas–El Paso
151	St. Louis Cardinals	Frank Lane	Linebacker	Stephen F. Austin
152	Cleveland Browns	Nathaniel James	Defensive back	Florida A&M
153	San Francisco 49ers	Bill Belk	Defensive end	Maryland-Eastern Shore
154	Chicago Bears	Jim Schmedding	Center	Weber State
155	Cincinnati Bengals	Dewey Warren	Quarterback	Tennessee
156	Cincinnati Bengals	Essex Johnson	Defensive back	Grambling
157	Philadelphia Eagles	Dave Martin	Defensive back	Notre Dame
158	Cincinnati Bengals	Elmo Malple	Wide receiver	Southern
159	Dallas Cowboys	D.D. Lewis	Linebacker	Mississippi State
160	Cincinnati Bengals	Sidney Ellis	Defensive back	Jackson
161	Los Angeles Rams	Bobby Webb	Center	Southern Mississippi
162	Atlanta Falcons	Rick Eber	Wide receiver	Tulsa
163	Cincinnati Bengals	Charles Williams	Running back	Arkansas-Pine Bluff
164	Green Bay Packers	Walter Chadwick	Running back	Tennessee
165	Cincinnati Bengals	James Johnson	Defensive back	South Carolina State

=== Round 7 ===
Pick #	NFL team	Player	Position	College
166	Cincinnati Bengals	Steve Smith	Tight end	Miami (FL)
167	Minnesota Vikings	Oscar Reed	Wide receiver	Colorado State
168	Oakland Raiders	John Harper	Center	Adams State
169	New Orleans Saints	Ray Phillips	Guard	Michigan
170	Boston Patriots	John Schneider	Quarterback	Toledo
171	Minnesota Vikings	Lenny Snow	Running back	Georgia Tech
172	Miami Dolphins	John Boynton	Tackle	Tennessee
173	Buffalo Bills	Pete Richardson	Defensive back	Dayton
174	Pittsburgh Steelers	Doug Dalton	Running back	New Mexico State
175	New Orleans Saints	Gene Howard	Wide receiver	Langston
176	Washington Redskins	Bob Brunet	Running back	Louisiana Tech
177	St. Louis Cardinals	Ken Henry	Wide receiver	Wake Forest
178	Philadelphia Eagles	Joe Przybycki	Guard	Michigan State
179	San Francisco 49ers	Jerry Richardson	Linebacker	Mississippi
180	New York Giants	Doug Chatman	Defensive end	Jackson State
181	Chicago Bears	Willie Holman	Defensive end	South Carolina State
182	New York Jets	Oscar Lubke	Tackle	Ball State
183	San Diego Chargers	Lane Fenner	Wide receiver	Florida State
184	Kansas City Chiefs	Sammy Grezaffi	Defensive back	LSU
185	Dallas Cowboys	Bob Taucher	Tackle	Nebraska
186	Cleveland Browns	Dale Brady	Running back	Memphis State
187	Houston Oilers	Paul Toscano	Defensive back	Wyoming
188	Baltimore Colts	Anthony Andrews	Running back	Hampton
189	Pittsburgh Steelers	Bill Glennon	Defensive tackle	Washington
190	Oakland Raiders	George Atkinson	Safety	Morris Brown
191	Green Bay Packers	Andy Beath	Defensive back	Duke
192	Cincinnati Bengals	Wes Bean	Linebacker	Grambling

=== Round 8 ===
Pick #	NFL team	Player	Position	College
193	Cincinnati Bengals	Harry Gunner	Linebacker	Oregon State
194	Atlanta Falcons	Ray Jeffords	Tight end	Georgia
195	New Orleans Saints	Dick Swatland	Guard	Notre Dame
196	Denver Broncos	Steve Holloway	Defensive back	Weber State
197	Boston Patriots	Daryl Johnson	Defensive back	Morgan State
198	Minnesota Vikings	Hank Urbanowicz	Defensive tackle	Miami (FL)
199	Buffalo Bills	Bob Kalsu	Tackle	Oklahoma
200	New York Jets	Bob Taylor	Running back	Maryland-Eastern Shore
201	Pittsburgh Steelers	Danny Holman	Quarterback	San Jose State
202	Detroit Lions	Terry Miller	Linebacker	Illinois
203	Washington Redskins	Brian Magnuson	Running back	Montana
204	Philadelphia Eagles	Al Lavan	Defensive back	Colorado State
205	St. Louis Cardinals	Jerry Daanen	Wide receiver	Miami (FL)
206	San Francisco 49ers	Charley Brown	Tackle	Augustana (SD)
207	San Francisco 49ers	Tom Gray	Wide receiver	Morehead State
208	Chicago Bears	Wayne Bell	Running back	Lenoir-Rhyne
209	San Diego Chargers	Elliot Gammage	Tight end	Tennessee
210	New York Jets	Jim Richards	Defensive back	Virginia Tech
211	Dallas Cowboys	Frank Brown	Defensive tackle	Albany State
212	Cleveland Browns	Tom Schoen	Defensive back	Notre Dame
213	Kansas City Chiefs	Lindon endsley	Center	North Texas State
214	New York Jets	Karl Henke	Defensive tackle	Tulsa
215	Los Angeles Rams	Joe Williams	Wide receiver	Florida A&M
216	Baltimore Colts	Tommy Davis	Guard	Tennessee State
217	Miami Dolphins	Randy Edmunds	Linebacker	Georgia Tech
218	Green Bay Packers	Tom Owens	Guard	Missouri-Rolla
219	Cincinnati Bengals	Ed Brantley	Tackle	North Texas State

=== Round 9 ===
Pick #	NFL team	Player	Position	College
220	Cincinnati Bengals	Phil Johnson	Defensive back	Long Beach State
221	Atlanta Falcons	Henry Holland	Center	North Texas State
222	Denver Broncos	Paul Smith	Linebacker	New Mexico
223	New Orleans Saints	Joe Blake	Tackle	Tulsa
224	Houston Oilers	Bob Robertson	Center	Illinois
225	Minnesota Vikings	Mike Donohoe	Tight end	San Francisco
226	Miami Dolphins	Sam McDowell	Tackle	Southwest Missouri State
227	Buffalo Bills	Gary McDermott	Running back	Tulsa
228	Pittsburgh Steelers	John Knight	Defensive end	Weber State
229	Detroit Lions	Greg Barton	Quarterback	Tulsa
230	Washington Redskins	Frank Liberatore	Defensive back	Clemson
231	St. Louis Cardinals	Billy Sinkule	Defensive end	Central Michigan
232	Philadelphia Eagles	Mike Evans	Center	Boston College
233	San Francisco 49ers	Case Boyett	Wide receiver	Brigham Young
234	New York Giants	Joe Koontz	Wide receiver	Cal State-San Francisco
235	Chicago Bears	Sam Moore	Tackle	Mississippi Valley State
236	New York Jets	Gary Houser	Tight end	Oregon State
237	San Diego Chargers	Grundy Harris	Running back	Southern
238	Cleveland Browns	David Porter	Defensive tackle	Michigan
239	Kansas City Chiefs	Wayne McClure	Linebacker	Mississippi
240	Miami Dolphins	Tom Paciorek	Defensive back	Houston
241	Dallas Cowboys	Ken Kmiec	Defensive back	Illinois
242	Baltimore Colts	Terry Cole	Running back	Indiana
243	Los Angeles Rams	Bob Richardson	Tackle	Washington
244	Oakland Raiders	John Eason	Tight end	Florida A&M
245	Green Bay Packers	Bob Apisa	Running back	Michigan State
246	Cincinnati Bengals	Steve Hanrahan	Defensive tackle	Weber State

=== Round 10 ===
Pick #	NFL team	Player	Position	College
247	Cincinnati Bengals	Wayne Patrick	Running back	Louisville
248	Atlanta Falcons	Mike Tomasini	Defensive tackle	Colorado State
249	Boston Patriots	John Outlaw	Defensive back	Jackson State
250	Minnesota Vikings	Tom Sakal	Defensive back	Minnesota
251	Buffalo Bills	Jerome Lawson	Defensive back	Utah
252	Denver Broncos	Bob Langford	Tackle	Middle Tennessee State
253	Miami Dolphins	Joe Mirto	Tackle	Miami (FL)
254	New Orleans Saints	Doug Robinson	Defensive back	Iowa State
255	Cleveland Browns	James Greer	Defensive end	Stephen F. Austin
256	Detroit Lions	Granville Liggins	Linebacker	Oklahoma
257	Baltimore Colts	Ocie Austin	Defensive back	Utah State
258	Philadelphia Eagles	John Mallory	Defensive back	West Virginia
259	St. Louis Cardinals	Tom Busch	Wide receiver	Iowa State
260	Green Bay Packers	Rick Cash	Tackle	Northeast Missouri State
261	San Francisco 49ers	Tommy Hart	Linebacker	Morris Brown
262	Chicago Bears	Fred Davis	Guard	Doane
263	Houston Oilers	Joe Raymond Peace	Linebacker	Louisiana Tech
264	New York Jets	Mike D'Amato	Defensive back	Hofstra
265	Kansas City Chiefs	Jack Gehrke	Wide receiver	Utah
266	Dallas Cowboys	Ben Olison	Wide receiver	Kansas
267	Cleveland Browns	Alvin Mitchell	Wide receiver	Morgan State
268	Houston Oilers	Tom Domres	Defensive end	Wisconsin
269	Los Angeles Rams	Allen Marcelin	Wide receiver	Parsons
270	Baltimore Colts	Ed Tomlin	Running back	Hampton
271	Oakland Raiders	Rick Owens	Defensive back	Pennsylvania
272	Green Bay Packers	Ron Worthen	Center	Arkansas State
273	Cincinnati Bengals	James Russell	End	North Texas State

=== Round 11 ===
Pick #	NFL team	Player	Position	College
274	Cincinnati Bengals	Wally Scott	Defensive back	Arizona
275	Atlanta Falcons	Greg Brezina	Linebacker	Houston
276	New Orleans Saints	Bennie Blocker	Tight end	South Carolina State
277	Oakland Raiders	Marvin Hubbard	Running back	Colgate
278	Boston Patriots	Paul Feldhausen	Tackle	Northland
279	Minnesota Vikings	Bill Haas	Wide receiver	Nebraska-Omaha
280	Miami Dolphins	Cornelius Cooper	Tackle	Prairie View A&M
281	Buffalo Bills	Dick Plagge	Running back	Auburn
282	Pittsburgh Steelers	Kim King	Quarterback	Georgia Tech
283	Detroit Lions	Dwight Little	Guard	Kentucky
284	Washington Redskins	Tom Garretson	Defensive back	Northwestern
285	St. Louis Cardinals	Larry Slagle	Guard	UCLA
286	Philadelphia Eagles	Len Persin	Defensive end	Boston College
287	San Francisco 49ers	Dennis Fitzgibbons	Guard	Syracuse
288	New York Giants	Henry Davis	Defensive end	Grambling
289	Chicago Bears	Rich Coady	Tight end	Memphis State
290	New York Jets	Henry Owens	Wide receiver	Weber State
291	San Diego Chargers	Dennis Partee	Kicker	Southern Methodist
292	Dallas Cowboys	Ron Shotts	Running back	Oklahoma
293	Cleveland Browns	Jim Alcorn	Quarterback	Clarion
294	Kansas City Chiefs	Tom Nosewicz	Defensive end	Tulane
295	Houston Oilers	Bill Halley	Wide receiver	La Verne
296	Baltimore Colts	Bill Pickens	Guard	Houston
297	Los Angeles Rams	John Pergine	Linebacker	Notre Dame
298	Oakland Raiders	Ralph (Chip) Oliver	Linebacker	USC
299	Green Bay Packers	Gordon Rule	Defensive back	Dartmouth
300	Cincinnati Bengals	Jeff Banks	Linebacker	Pacific

=== Round 12 ===
Pick #	NFL team	Player	Position	College
301	Cincinnati Bengals	Bob Trumpy	Tight end	Utah
302	Atlanta Falcons	A.J. Vaughn	Running back	Wayne State
303	New Orleans Saints	John Beck	Defensive back	San Diego State
304	Denver Broncos	Bobby Hendrix	Tackle	Mississippi
305	Boston Patriots	Jim Cheyunski	Linebacker	Syracuse
306	Buffalo Bills	Greg Pipes	Linebacker	Baylor
307	Miami Dolphins	Paul Paxton	Tackle	Akron
308	Minnesota Vikings	Howie Small	Center	Rhode Island
309	Pittsburgh Steelers	Sam Wheeler	Linebacker	Wisconsin
310	Detroit Lions	Ed Caruthers	Defensive back	Arizona
311	Washington Redskins	Dave Weedman	Defensive tackle	Western Washington
312	Philadelphia Eagles	Thurston Taylor	Tight end	Florida State
313	St. Louis Cardinals	Vernon Emerson	Tackle	Minnesota-Duluth
314	New York Giants	Jim Holifield	Defensive back	Jackson State
315	San Francisco 49ers	Henry Johnson	Quarterback	Fisk
316	Chicago Bears	Emilio Vallez	Linebacker	New Mexico
317	San Diego Chargers	Jeff Queen	Linebacker	Morgan State
318	New York Jets	Ray Hayes	Defensive tackle	Toledo
319	Cleveland Browns	Tom Beutler	Linebacker	Toledo
320	Kansas City Chiefs	Bobby Johns	Defensive back	Alabama
321	Dallas Cowboys	Wilson Whitty	Linebacker	Boston University
322	Houston Oilers	Barry Lischner	Running back	Missouri
323	Los Angeles Rams	Harold Jackson	Wide receiver	Jackson State
324	Baltimore Colts	James Jackson	Tackle	Jackson State
325	Green Bay Packers	Dennis Porter	Tackle	Northern Michigan
326	Oakland Raiders	Larry Plantz	Wide receiver	Colorado
327	Cincinnati Bengals	Harold Jones	Tackle	Grambling

=== Round 13 ===
Pick #	NFL team	Player	Position	College
328	Cincinnati Bengals	James Bivins	Linebacker	Texas Southern
329	Atlanta Falcons	Billy Harris	Running back	Colorado
330	Denver Broncos	Charlie Greer	Defensive back	Colorado
331	New Orleans Saints	K.O. Trepanier	Defensive end	Montana State
332	Boston Patriots	Max Huber	Tackle	Brigham Young
333	Minnesota Vikings	Rich Wherry	Wide receiver	Northern State (SD)
334	Miami Dolphins	Bob Joswick	Defensive tackle	Tulsa
335	Pittsburgh Steelers	Joe Roundy	Guard	Puget Sound
336	Buffalo Bills	Dan Darragh	Quarterback	William & Mary
337	Detroit Lions	Chuck Bailey	Tackle	Cal State-Humboldt
338	Washington Redskins	Mike St. Louis	Tackle	Central Missouri State
339	St. Louis Cardinals	Mack Sauls	Defensive back	Southwest Texas State
340	Philadelphia Eagles	George Barron	Tackle	Mississippi State
341	San Francisco 49ers	Tom Mitrakos	Center	Pittsburgh
342	New York Giants	John Gallagher	Defensive end	Boston University
343	Chicago Bears	Willie Dearion	Wide receiver	Prairie View A&M
344	New York Jets	Tom Myslinski	Guard	Maryland
345	San Diego Chargers	Fred Combs	Defensive back	North Carolina State
346	Kansas City Chiefs	Jim Kavanagh	Wide receiver	Boston College
347	Dallas Cowboys	Carter Lord	Wide receiver	Harvard
348	Cleveland Browns	Terry Sellers	Defensive back	Georgia
349	Houston Oilers	James Dousay	Running back	LSU
350	Baltimore Colts	Howard Tennebar	Tackle	Kent State
351	Los Angeles Rams	Dean Halverson	Linebacker	Washington
352	Oakland Raiders	Larry Blackstone	Running back	Fairmont State
353	Green Bay Packers	Frank Geiselman	Wide receiver	Rhode Island
354	Cincinnati Bengals	Teddy Washington	Running back	San Diego State

=== Round 14 ===
Pick #	NFL team	Player	Position	College
355	Cincinnati Bengals	Les Webster	Running back	Iowa State
356	Atlanta Falcons	Joe Polk	Running back	Livingstone
357	Denver Broncos	Marlin Briscoe	Quarterback	Nebraska-Omaha
358	Boston Patriots	Henry McKay	Defensive end	Guilford
359	New Orleans Saints	Herb Covington	Running back	Memphis State
360	Minnesota Vikings	Don Evans	Tackle	Arkansas-Pine Bluff
361	Buffalo Bills	Chuck DeVliegher	Defensive tackle	Memphis State
362	Miami Dolphins	Ray Blunk	Tight end	Xavier
363	Pittsburgh Steelers	Lou Harris	Defensive end	Kent State
364	Detroit Lions	Richie Davis	Wide receiver	Upsala
365	Washington Redskins	Dave Zivich	Tackle	California-Santa Barbara
366	Philadelphia Eagles	Dan Williamson	Linebacker	West Virginia
367	St. Louis Cardinals	Vic Bender	Center	Northeast Louisiana
368	New York Giants	Bill Moreman	Running back	Florida State
369	San Francisco 49ers	Alex Moore	Running back	Norfolk State
370	Chicago Bears	Harold Gargus	Defensive tackle	New Mexico State
371	San Diego Chargers	Jim Campbell	Linebacker	West Texas State
372	New York Jets	Harvey Nairn	Running back	Southern
373	Dallas Cowboys	Ron Williams	Defensive back	West Virginia
374	Cleveland Browns	Edgar Whipps	Running back	Jackson State
375	Kansas City Chiefs	Robert Holmes	Running back	Southern
376	Houston Oilers	Richard Stotter	Guard	Houston
377	Los Angeles Rams	Cephus Jackson	Defensive back	Jackson State
378	Baltimore Colts	Charles Mitchell	Tight end	Alabama State
379	Oakland Raiders	Ray Carlson	Linebacker	Hamline
380	Green Bay Packers	John Farler	Wide receiver	Colorado
381	Cincinnati Bengals	Steve Lewicke	Wide receiver	Texas–El Paso

=== Round 15 ===
Pick #	NFL team	Player	Position	College
382	Cincinnati Bengals	Harvey Palmore	Guard	Morgan State
383	Atlanta Falcons	Don Bean	Wide receiver	Houston
384	New Orleans Saints	Wilmer Cooks	Running back	Colorado
385	Boston Patriots	Art McMahon	Defensive back	North Carolina State
386	Denver Broncos	Jeff Kuhman	Linebacker	Vermont
387	Minnesota Vikings	Jim Haynie	Quarterback	West Chester
388	Miami Dolphins	Ken Corbin	Linebacker	Miami (FL)
389	Buffalo Bills	John Gilmore	Defensive tackle	Peru State
390	Pittsburgh Steelers	Bob Lanning	Defensive end	Northern Montana
391	Detroit Lions	Jim Oliver	Running back	Colorado State
392	Washington Redskins	Coger Coverson	Guard	Texas Southern
393	St. Louis Cardinals	Dave Lovich	Defensive end	Northwestern State (LA)
394	Philadelphia Eagles	Joe Graham	Guard	Tennessee
395	San Francisco 49ers	Clarence Spencer	Wide receiver	Louisville
396	New York Giants	McKinley Boston	Guard	Minnesota
397	Chicago Bears	Rich Jaeger	Center	Gustavus Adolphus
398	New York Jets	Ronnie Ehrig	Defensive back	Texas
399	San Diego Chargers	Dan Kramarczyk	Tackle	Dayton
400	Cleveland Browns	Bob Baxter	Wide receiver	Memphis State
401	Kansas City Chiefs	Bill Chambless	Guard	Miami (FL)
402	Dallas Cowboys	Tony Lunceford	Kicker	Auburn
403	San Diego Chargers	Robert Wells	Tackle	Johnson C. Smith
404	Baltimore Colts	Jeff Beaver	Quarterback	North Carolina
405	Los Angeles Rams	Dennis Yell	Tackle	Moorhead State
406	Oakland Raiders	Mike Leinert	Running back	Texas Tech
407	Green Bay Packers	Ridley Gibson	Defensive back	Baylor
408	Cincinnati Bengals	Joe Mira	Wide receiver	Miami (FL)

=== Round 16 ===
Pick #	NFL team	Player	Position	College
409	Cincinnati Bengals	Monk Williams	Defensive back	Alcorn State
410	Atlanta Falcons	Roy Hall	Tackle	San Jose State
411	New Orleans Saints	Elie Ghattas	Guard	Ball State
412	Denver Broncos	Adin Brown	Linebacker	William & Mary
413	Boston Patriots	Charley Fulton	Running back	Tennessee
414	Minnesota Vikings	Lary Kuharich	Defensive back	Boston College
415	Buffalo Bills	John Frantz	Center	California
416	Miami Dolphins	Henry Still	Defensive tackle	Bethune-Cookman
417	Pittsburgh Steelers	Rocky Bleier	Running back	Notre Dame
418	Detroit Lions	Bob Rokita	Defensive end	Arizona State
419	Washington Redskins	Willie Turner	Running back	Jackson State
420	Philadelphia Eagles	Phil Creel	Tackle	Northwestern State (LA)
421	St. Louis Cardinals	Dan Lankas	Linebacker	Kansas State
422	New York Giants	Kenny Parker	Defensive back	Fordham
423	San Francisco 49ers	Tom Rosenow	Defensive tackle	Northern Illinois
424	Chicago Bears	Jim Murphy	Kicker	Utah State
425	San Diego Chargers	Dick Farley	Defensive back	Boston University
426	New York Jets	Tom Bilotta	Guard	Adams State
427	Kansas City Chiefs	Pat Talbert	Tackle	Southwest Missouri State
428	Dallas Cowboys	Larry Cole	Defensive tackle	Hawaii
429	Cleveland Browns	Dick Sievert	Defensive end	Wisconsin–River Falls
430	Houston Oilers	Bob Smith	Defensive back	Miami (OH)
431	Los Angeles Rams	Jimmy Raye	Quarterback	Michigan State
432	Baltimore Colts	Walt Blackledge	Wide receiver	San Jose State
433	Oakland Raiders	David Morrison	Defensive back	Southwest Texas State
434	Green Bay Packers	Al Groves	Tackle	St. Norbert
435	Cincinnati Bengals	Brown Marks	Linebacker	Indiana

=== Round 17 ===
Pick #	NFL team	Player	Position	College
436	Cincinnati Bengals	Don Manning	Linebacker	UCLA
437	Atlanta Falcons	Jim Schmidt	Defensive back	Cal State-San Francisco
438	Denver Broncos	Steve Grady	Running back	USC
439	New Orleans Saints	Jim Ferguson	Linebacker	USC
440	Boston Patriots	Ed Koontz	Linebacker	Catawba
441	Minnesota Vikings	Bob Lee	Quarterback	Pacific
442	Miami Dolphins	Bill Nemeth	Center	Arizona
443	Buffalo Bills	Dick Hines	Defensive tackle	Kentucky State
444	Pittsburgh Steelers	Bob Cole	Linebacker	South Carolina
445	Minnesota Vikings	Bill Hull	Guard	Tennessee Tech
446	Washington Redskins	Frank Bosch	Defensive tackle	Colorado
447	St. Louis Cardinals	Bob Lee	Wide receiver	Minnesota
448	Philadelphia Eagles	Joe Forzani	Linebacker	Utah State
449	San Francisco 49ers	Dennis Patera	Kicker	Brigham Young
450	New York Giants	Larry Kohn	Tight end	Georgia
451	Chicago Bears	Gene Layton	Defensive tackle	Colorado State
452	New York Jets	Myles Strasser	Running back	Wisconsin–Oshkosh
453	San Diego Chargers	Dan Andrews	Tight end	West Texas State
454	Dallas Cowboys	George Nordgren	Running back	Houston
455	Cleveland Browns	Wayne McDuffie	Center	Florida State
456	Kansas City Chiefs	Wesley Williams	Linebacker	Texas Southern
457	Houston Oilers	Billy Alsbrooks	Defensive back	North Carolina Central
458	Baltimore Colts	Roy Pederson	Linebacker	Northern Iowa
459	Philadelphia Eagles	Frank Antonini	Running back	Parsons
460	Oakland Raiders	Steve Berry	Wide receiver	Catawba
461	Green Bay Packers	Ken Rota	Running back	North Dakota State
462	Cincinnati Bengals	Jimmy Smith	Tight end	Jackson State

= Pro Bowler	= AFL All-Star	= Hall of Famer

== Hall of Famers ==
- Larry Csonka, running back from Syracuse, taken 1st round 8th overall by AFL's Miami Dolphins

Inducted: Professional Football Hall of Fame class of 1987.

- Art Shell, offensive tackle from Maryland Eastern Shore, taken 3rd round 80th overall by AFL's Oakland Raiders

Inducted: Professional Football Hall of Fame class of 1989.

- Ron Yary, offensive tackle from Southern California, taken 1st round 1st overall by Minnesota Vikings

Inducted: Professional Football Hall of Fame class of 2001.

- Elvin Bethea, offensive tackle from North Carolina A&T, taken 3rd round 77th overall by AFL's Houston Oilers

Inducted: Professional Football Hall of Fame class of 2003.

- Charlie Sanders, tight end from Minnesota, taken 3rd round 74th overall by Detroit Lions

Inducted: Professional Football Hall of Fame class of 2007.

- Curley Culp, defensive tackle from Arizona State, taken 2nd round 31st overall by AFL's Denver Broncos

Inducted: Professional Football Hall of Fame class of 2013.

- Claude Humphrey, defensive end from Tennessee State, taken 1st round 3rd overall by Atlanta Falcons

Inducted: Professional Football Hall of Fame class of 2014.

- Ken Stabler, quarterback from Alabama, taken 2nd round 52nd overall by AFL's Oakland Raiders

Inducted: Professional Football Hall of Fame class of 2016.

== Notable undrafted players ==
^{†}	= Pro Bowler

Original NFL team	Player	Pos.	College	Notes
Atlanta Falcons	Grady Allen	LB	Texas A&M	
Atlanta Falcons	Bob Etter ^{†}	K	Georgia	
Atlanta Falcons	Bruce Lemmerman	QB	Cal State Northridge	
Atlanta Falcons	Harmon Wages	RB	Florida	
Boston Patriots	Bob Tucker	TE	Bloomsburg	
Cincinnati Bengals	Bruce Coslet	TE	Pacific	
Cincinnati Bengals	Bill Peterson	LB	San Jose State	
Cincinnati Bengals	Tom Sherman	QB	Penn State	
Cincinnati Bengals	Sam Wyche	QB	Furman	
Cleveland Browns	Hubie Bryant	WR	Minnesota	
Cleveland Browns	Don Gault	QB	Hofstra	
Dallas Cowboys	Hugo Hollas	S	Rice	
Denver Broncos	Joe DiVito	P/QB	Boston College	
Denver Broncos	Terry Erwin	RB	Boston College	
Denver Broncos	Tom Oberg	S	Portland State	
Denver Broncos	Billy Van Heusen	P/WR	Maryland	
Houston Oilers	Steve Quinn	C	Notre Dame	
Miami Dolphins	Manny Fernandez	DE	Utah	
Miami Dolphins	Gene Milton	WR	Florida A&M	
Minnesota Vikings	Gayle Knief	WR	Morningside	
New Orleans Saints	Tony Baker ^{†}	RB	Iowa State	
Philadelphia Eagles	Wayne Colman	LB	Temple	
San Diego Chargers	Tom Dempsey ^{†}	K	Palomar	
San Diego Chargers	Jim Fetherston	LB	California	
