= 1968 Philadelphia Eagles season =

NFL team season

- Owner: Jerry Wolman
- Head coach: Joe Kuharich
- Home stadium: Franklin Field

Results
- Record: 2–12
- Division place: 4th NFL Capitol
- Playoffs: Did not qualify
- Pro Bowlers: K Sam Baker; RT Bob Brown; RB Tom Woodeshick

The 1968 Philadelphia Eagles season was the franchise's 36th season in the National Football League (NFL). They failed to improve on their previous output of 6–7–1, winning only two games. Eagles fans expected to get O. J. Simpson if the team went winless, but a finish of 2–12 was not enough to top futility due to the Buffalo Bills going 1–12–1, which meant they would draft Simpson with the first pick. Before they won their twelfth game, which they won, the Eagles were on target for a winless season at 0–11. They were the first team in the NFL to lose eleven consecutive games in one season since their own 1936 season and the first football team in general to lose eleven in a row since the 1962 Oakland Raiders lost their first thirteen games in the AFL.

The Philadelphia Eagles Santa Claus incident, one of the most infamous incidents in Philadelphia sports history, came at halftime of the final game of the dismal 1968 season, when the Eagles were on their way to losing to the Minnesota Vikings. The Eagles had planned a Christmas pageant for halftime of the December 15 game, but the condition of the field was too poor. Instead, the team asked a fan dressed as Santa Claus to run onto the field to celebrate with a group of cheerleaders. The fans, in no mood to celebrate, loudly booed and threw snowballs at "Santa Claus."

== Offseason ==
=== 1968 NFL/AFL draft ===
Round	Pick	Player	Position	School
1	14	Tim Rossovich	DE	USC
2	39	Cyril Pinder	RB	Illinois
3	68	Adrian Young	LB	USC
4	95	Len McNeil	G	Fresno State
5	122	Mike Dirks	T	Wyoming
5	124	Mark Nordquist	T	Pacific
6	150	Thurman Randle	T	Texas – El Paso
6	157	Dave Martin	DB	Notre Dame
7	178	Joe Przybycki	G	Michigan State
8	204	Al Lavan	DB	Colorado State
9	232	Mike Evans	C	Boston College
10	258	John Mallory	DB	West Virginia
11	286	Len Persin	DB	Boston College
12	312	Thurston Taylor	TE	Florida State
13	340	George Barron	T	Mississippi State
14	366	Dan Williamson	LB	West Virginia
15	394	Joe Graham	G	Tennessee
16	420	Phil Creel	T	Northwestern State (LA)
17	448	Joe Forzani	LB	Utah State
17	459	Frank Antonini	RB	Parsons

=== Undrafted free agents ===
1968 undrafted free agents of note
Player	Position	College
Jim Murphy	Center	Syracuse

== Personnel ==
=== Staff / Coaches ===
1968 Philadelphia Eagles staff
Front office: Principal / Majority Owner – Jerry Wolman; General manager – Joe Kuharich (de facto); Head coaches: Head coach - Joe Kuharich; Offensive coaches: Offensive Coordinator / Receivers - Herman Ball; Offensive Assistant - Mike Nixon; Running Backs – Jack Zilly; Offensive Line – Dick Stanfel	Defensive coaches: Defensive Coordinator - Dick Evans; Defensive Backs / Secondary – Fred Bruney

=== Roster ===
1968 Philadelphia Eagles roster
Quarterbacks (QB): 7 John Huarte; 16 Norm Snead; Running backs (RB): 25 Larry Conjar; 29 Izzy Lang; 22 Cyril Pinder; 37 Tom Woodeshick; Wide receivers (WR): 85 Gary Ballman; 18 Ben Hawkins; 13 Chuck Hughes; Tight ends (TE): 89 Mike Ditka; 86 Fred Hill	Offensive linemen (OL): 76 Bob Brown T; 54 Gene Ceppetelli C; 62 Mike Dirks G; 59 Mike Evans C; 78 Dave Graham T; 71 Dick Hart G; 79 Lane Howell T; 68 Mark Nordquist G; 50 Dave Recher C; Defensive linemen (DL): 73 Don Hultz DE; 74 Frank Molden DT; 73 Jim Norton DT; 88 Gary Pettigrew DT; 82 Tim Rossovich DE; 58 Mel Tom DE; 64 Dean Wink DT	Linebackers (LB): 55 Fred Brown OLB; 49 Wayne Colman OLB; 52 Dave Lloyd MLB; 45 Ron Medved OLB; 53 Harold Wells OLB; 35 Adrian Young OLB; Defensive backs (DB): 30 Alvin Haymond CB; 47 John Mallory CB/S; 26 Al Nelson CB; 9 Jim Nettles CB; 24 Nate Ramsey SS; 21 Joe Scarpati FS; Special teams (ST): 38 Sam Baker K/P	Practice squad: 4 Benjy Dial QB; 27 Roger Grimes RB; 46 Al Lavan CB/S; Reserve: 80 Randy Beisler DE (IR); 19 Dan Berry RB (IR); 81 Ron Goodwin WR (IR); 23 Harry Jones RB (IR); 51 Ike Kelley LB (IR); 84 Jim Kelly TE (IR); 90 Len Persin DE (IR); 72 Floyd Peters DT (IR); 70 Tom Sarkisian T (IR); 70 Jim Skaggs G (IR); 61 Arunas Vasys LB (IR); 41 Harry Wilson RB (IR); Rookies in italics

== Schedule ==
Week	Date	Opponent	Result	Record	Venue	Attendance
1	September 15	at Green Bay Packers	**L** 13–30	0–1	Lambeau Field	50,861
2	September 22	**New York Giants**	**L** 25–34	0–2	Franklin Field	60,858
3	September 29	**Dallas Cowboys**	**L** 13–45	0–3	Franklin Field	60,858
4	October 6	at **Washington Redskins**	**L** 14–17	0–4	D.C. Stadium	50,816
5	October 13	at **Dallas Cowboys**	**L** 14–34	0–5	Cotton Bowl	72,083
6	October 20	Chicago Bears	**L** 16–29	0–6	Franklin Field	60,858
7	October 27	at Pittsburgh Steelers	**L** 3–6	0–7	Pitt Stadium	26,908
8	November 3	St. Louis Cardinals	**L** 17–45	0–8	Franklin Field	59,208
9	November 10	**Washington Redskins**	**L** 10–16	0–9	Franklin Field	59,133
10	November 17	at **New York Giants**	**L** 6–7	0–10	Yankee Stadium	62,896
11	November 24	at Cleveland Browns	**L** 13–47	0–11	Cleveland Municipal Stadium	62,338
12	November 28	at Detroit Lions	**W** 12–0	1–11	Tiger Stadium	47,909
13	December 8	New Orleans Saints	**W** 29–17	2–11	Franklin Field	57,128
14	December 15	Minnesota Vikings	**L** 17–24	2–12	Franklin Field	54,530
Note: Intra-division opponents are in **bold** text.

== Game recaps ==
A recap of the scoring plays and the game scores by quarters during the year. The record after the team's name reflects this games outcome also.

=== Week 1 at Packers ===
Week One: Philadelphia Eagles (0–0) at Green Bay Packers (0–0)

Quarter	1	2	3	4	Total
Eagles	3	3	0	7	13
Packers	7	14	6	3	30

at Lambeau Field, Green Bay, Wisconsin

- Date: September 15
- Game attendance: 67 °F (19 °C)
- Box Score

Game information

First quarter

- PHI – Sam Baker 27-yard field goal. Eagles 3–0. Drive:
- GB – Jim Grabowski 6-yard run (Jerry Kramer kick). Packers 7–3. Drive:

Second quarter

- GB – Carroll Dale 12-yard pass from Bart Starr (Jerry Kramer kick). Packers 14–3. Drive:
- PHI – Sam Baker 17-yard field goal. Packers 14–6. Drive:
- GB – Boyd Dowler 55-yard pass from Bart Starr (Jerry Kramer kick). Packers 21–6. Drive:

Third quarter

- GB – Jerry Kramer 17-yard field goal. Packers 24–6. Drive:
- GB – Jerry Kramer 22-yard field goal. Packers 27–6. Drive:

Fourth quarter

- PHI – Gary Ballman 2-yard pass from King Hill (Sam Baker kick). Packers 27–13. Drive:
- GB – Jerry Kramer 35-yard field goal. Packers 30–13. Drive:

Top passers

- PHI – King Hill – 16/35, 196 yards, TD, INT
- GB – Bart Starr – 14/18, 220 yards, TD, INT

Top rushers

- PHI – Tom Woodeshick – 11 rushes, 48 yards
- GB – Donny Anderson – 12 rushes, 92 yards

Top receivers

- PHI – Ben Hawkins – 4 receptions, 85 yards
- GB – Boyd Dowler – 5 receptions, 110 yards, TD

=== Week 2 ===
Sunday, September 22, 1968

Played in Franklin Field on grass in 70 °F (21.1 °C) weather with a 9 miles per hour (14 km/h; 7.8 kn) wind

	1	2	3	4	Total
New York Giants (2–0–0)	7	10	10	7	34
Philadelphia Eagles (0–2–0)	12	0	7	6	25

		Scoring Plays
1st	Giants	Randy Minniear 2-yard rush (Pete Gogolak kick)
	Eagles	Alvin Haymond 98-yard kickoff return (kick failed)
	Eagles	Izzy Lang 23-yard pass from John Huarte (kick failed)
2nd	Giants	Spider Lockhart 72-yard interception return (Pete Gogolak kick)
	Giants	Pete Gogolak 20-yard field goal
3rd	Eagles	Tom Woodeshick 54-yard rush (Sam Baker kick)
	Giants	Pete Gogolak 30-yard field goal
	Giants	Joe Morrison 12-yard pass from Fran Tarkenton (Pete Gogolak kick)
4th	Giants	Bobby Duhon 1-yard rush (Pete Gogolak kick)
	Eagles	Ben Hawkins 92-yard pass from King Hill (kick failed)

=== Week 3 ===
Sunday, September 29, 1968.

Played in Franklin Field on grass in 61 °F (16.1 °C) weather with a 12 miles per hour (19 km/h; 10 kn) wind

	1	2	3	4	Total
Dallas Cowboys (3–0–0)	7	7	14	17	45
Philadelphia Eagles (0–3–0)	3	10	0	0	13

Scoring

1st Quarter Scoring Plays

- Eagles – Sam Baker 23-yard field goal
- Cowboys – Dan Reeves 2-yard pass from Don Meredith (Mike Clark kick)

2nd Quarter Scoring Plays

- Cowboys – Lance Rentzel 11-yard pass from Don Meredith (Mike Clark kick)
- Eagles – Gary Ballman 18-yard pass from King Hill (Sam Baker kick)
- Eagles – Sam Baker 13-yard field goal

3rd Quarter Scoring Plays

- Cowboys – Bob Hayes 44-yard pass from Don Meredith (Mike Clark kick)
- Cowboys – Don Perkins 10-yard pass from Don Meredith (Mike Clark kick)

4th Quarter Scoring Plays

- Cowboys – Mike Clark 26-yard field goal
- Cowboys – Lance Rentzel 8-yard pass from Don Meredith (Mike Clark kick)
- Cowboys – Craig Morton 4-yard rush (Mike Clark kick)

=== Week 4 ===
Sunday, October 6, 1968

Played at District of Columbia Stadium on grass in 46 °F (7.8 °C) weather with a 9 miles per hour (14 km/h; 7.8 kn) wind

	1	2	3	4	Total
Philadelphia Eagles (0–4–0)	0	0	0	14	14
Washington Redskins (2–2–0)	0	10	7	0	17

=== Week 5 ===
Sunday, October 13, 1968

Played at the Cotton Bowl on grass in 77 °F (25 °C) weather with a 12 miles per hour (19 km/h; 10 kn) wind.

	1	2	3	4	Total
Philadelphia Eagles (0–5–0)	0	0	7	7	14
Dallas Cowboys (5–0–0)	7	7	7	13	34

Scoring 1st Quarter Scoring Plays

- Cowboys – Pettis Norman 9-yard pass from Don Meredith (Mike Clark kick)

2nd Quarter Scoring Plays

- Cowboys – Rayfield Wright 15-yard pass from Don Meredith (Mike Clark kick)

3rd Quarter Scoring Plays

- Eagles – John Mallory 58-yard pass from Sam Baker (Sam Baker kick)
- Cowboys – Don Perkins 1-yard rush (Mike Clark kick)

4th Quarter Scoring Plays

- Cowboys – Mike Clark 26-yard field goal
- Cowboys – Mike Clark 21-yard field goal
- Cowboys – Craig Baynham 22-yard rush (Mike Clark kick)
- Eagles – Mike Ditka 4-yard pass from Norm Snead (Sam Baker kick)

=== Week 6 ===
Sunday, October 20, 1968

Played at Franklin Field on grass in 62 °F (16.7 °C) weather with a 12 miles per hour (19 km/h; 10 kn) wind

	1	2	3	4	Total
Chicago Bears (2–4–0)	7	6	3	13	29
Philadelphia Eagles (0–6–0)	3	10	3	0	16

=== Week 7 ===
Sunday, October 27, 1968

Played at Pitt Stadium on grass in 45 °F (7.2 °C) weather with a 14 miles per hour (23 km/h; 12 kn) wind

	1	2	3	4	Total
Philadelphia Eagles (0–7–0)	0	3	0	0	3
Pittsburgh Steelers (1–6–0)	0	0	0	6	6

		Scoring Plays
2nd	Eagles	Sam Baker 38-yard field goal
4th	Steelers	Booth Lusteg 34-yard field goal
	Steelers	Booth Lusteg 15-yard field goal

=== Week 8 ===
Sunday, November 3, 1968

Played at Franklin Field on grass in 55 °F (12.8 °C) weather with a 9 miles per hour (14 km/h; 7.8 kn) wind

	1	2	3	4	Total
St. Louis Cardinals (5–3–0)	7	7	14	17	45
Philadelphia Eagles (0–8–0)	0	10	7	0	17

		Scoring Plays
1st	Cardinals	Jim Hart 1-yard rush (Jim Bakken kick)
2nd	Eagles	Fred Hill 31-yard pass from Norm Snead (Sam Baker kick)
	Cardinals	Willis Crenshaw 14-yard rush (Jim Bakken kick)
	Eagles	Sam Baker 12-yard field goal
3rd	Eagles	Tom Woodeshick 12-yard rush (Sam Baker kick)
	Cardinals	Jim Hart 1-yard rush (Jim Bakken kick)
	Cardinals	Roy Shivers 40-yard pass from Jim Hart (Jim Bakken kick)
4th	Cardinals	Roy Shivers 1-yard rush (Jim Bakken kick)
	Cardinals	Jim Bakken 47-yard field goal
	Cardinals	Roy Shivers 4-yard rush (Jim Bakken kick)

=== Week 9 ===
Sunday, November 10, 1968

Played at Franklin Field on grass in 40 °F (4.4 °C) weather with a 15 miles per hour (24 km/h; 13 kn) wind

	1	2	3	4	Total
Washington Redskins (4–5–0)	3	6	7	0	16
Philadelphia Eagles (0–9–0)	0	3	0	7	10

		SCORING PLAYS
1st	Redskins	Charlie Gogolak 15-yard field goal
2nd	Redskins	Charlie Gogolak 25-yard field goal
	Eagles	Sam Baker 37-yard field goal
	Redskins	Charlie Gogolak 9-yard field goal
3rd	Redskins	Gerry Allen 1-yard rush (Charlie Gogolak kick)
4th	Eagles	Ben Hawkins 6-yard pass from Norm Snead (Sam Baker kick)

=== Week 10 ===
Sunday, November 17, 1968

Played at Yankee Stadium on grass in 40 °F (4.4 °C) weather with a 14 miles per hour (23 km/h; 12 kn) wind

	1	2	3	4	Total
Philadelphia Eagles (0–10–0)	3	3	0	0	6
New York Giants (7–3–0)	0	7	0	0	7

		SCORING PLAYS
1st	Eagles	Sam Baker 19-yard field goal
2nd	Giants	Bobby Duhon 33-yard pass from Fran Tarkenton (Pete Gogolak kick)
	Eagles	Sam Baker 19-yard field goal

=== Week 11 ===
Sunday, November 24, 1968.

Played in Cleveland Municipal Stadium on grass in 52 °F (11.1 °C) weather with a 13 miles per hour (21 km/h; 11 kn) wind

	1	2	3	4	Total
Philadelphia Eagles (0–11–0)	0	6	0	7	13
Cleveland Browns (8–3–0)	10	10	14	13	47

=== Week 12 ===
Thursday, November 28, 1968 Thanksgiving Day

Played in Tiger Stadium on grass in 40 °F (4.4 °C) weather with a 15 miles per hour (24 km/h; 13 kn) wind

Going into this week’s games the Eagles are 0–11, the Buffalo Bills are 1–9–1, the Falcons are 2–9 and the Steelers are 2–8–1.

	1	2	3	4	Total
Philadelphia Eagles (1–11–0)	3	3	3	3	12
Detroit Lions (3–7–2)	0	0	0	0	0

Scoring

1st Quarter Scoring Plays

- Eagles – Sam Baker 36-yard field goal

2nd Quarter Scoring Plays

- Eagles – Sam Baker 18-yard field goal

3rd Quarter Scoring Plays

- Eagles – Sam Baker 32-yard field goal

4th Quarter Scoring Plays

- Eagles – Sam Baker 35-yard field goal

=== Week 13 ===
Sunday, December 8, 1968

Played at Franklin Field on grass in 31 °F (−0.6 °C) with a 16 miles per hour (26 km/h; 14 kn) wind and a wind chill of 19 °F or −7.2 °C.

	1	2	3	4	Total
New Orleans Saints (3–9–1)	7	7	3	0	17
Philadelphia Eagles (2–11–0)	0	13	2	14	29

Scoring

1st Quarter Scoring Plays

- Saints Jimmy Hester 4-yard pass from Billy Kilmer (Charlie Durkee kick)

2nd Quarter Scoring Plays

- Eagles Gary Ballman 55-yard pass from Norm Snead (Sam Baker kick)
- Saints Billy Kilmer 2-yard rush (Charlie Durkee kick)
- Eagles Ben Hawkins 14-yard pass from Norm Snead (kick failed)

3rd Quarter Scoring Plays

- Saints Charlie Durkee 10-yard field goal
- Eagles Safety, Conjar tackled Brown in end zone

4th Quarter Scoring Plays

- Eagles Ben Hawkins 23-yard pass from Norm Snead (Sam Baker kick)
- Eagles Tom Woodeshick 30-yard rush (Sam Baker kick)

=== Week 14 ===
Sunday, December 15, 1968

Played at Franklin Field on grass in 28 °F (−2.2 °C) weather with a 20 miles per hour (32 km/h; 17 kn) wind and a wind chill of 15 °F or −9.4 °C. During halftime of this last home game of the season, a group of Eagles fans showed their discontent by booing, and then throwing snowballs at, a performer dressed as Santa Claus.

	1	2	3	4	Total
Minnesota Vikings (8–6–0)	0	7	7	10	24
Philadelphia Eagles (2–12–0)	0	7	3	7	17

		SCORING PLAYS
2nd	Eagles	Gary Ballman 5-yard pass from Norm Snead (Sam Baker kick)
	Vikings	Bill Brown 57-yard pass from Joe Kapp (Fred Cox kick)
3rd	Vikings	Gene Washington 30-yard pass from Joe Kapp (Fred Cox kick)
	Eagles	Sam Baker 25-yard field goal
4th	Vikings	Joe Kapp 2-yard rush (Fred Cox kick)
	Eagles	Fred Hill 12-yard pass from Norm Snead (Sam Baker kick)
	Vikings	Fred Cox 17-yard field goal

== Standings ==
NFL Capitol
	W	L	T	PCT	DIV	CONF	PF	PA	STK
Dallas Cowboys	12	2	0	.857	5–1	9–1	431	186	W5
New York Giants	7	7	0	.500	5–1	7–3	294	325	L4
Washington Redskins	5	9	0	.357	2–4	3–7	249	358	W1
Philadelphia Eagles	2	12	0	.143	0–6	1–9	202	351	L1

Note: Tie games were not officially counted in the standings until 1972.
