= Philadelphia Eagles Santa Claus incident =

1968 American football incident

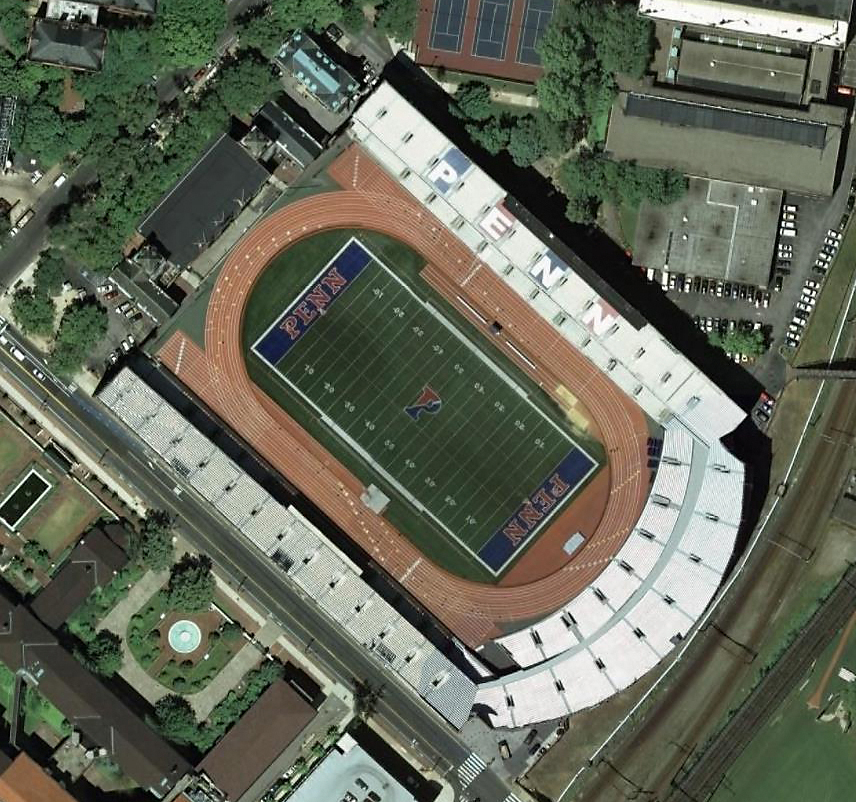
- Franklin Field, the site of the game
Minnesota Vikings (7–6)	Philadelphia Eagles (2–11)
24	17
Head coach: Bud Grant	Head coach: Joe Kuharich
	1	2	3	4	Total
MIN	0	7	7	10	24
PHL	0	7	3	7	17
- Date: December 15, 1968
- Stadium: Franklin Field; Philadelphia, Pennsylvania
- Attendance: 54,530

TV in the United States
- Network: CBS
- Announcers: Jack Buck, Pat Summerall, and Bill McColgan

The Philadelphia Eagles Santa Claus incident occurred during halftime of an American football game in the 1968 season of the National Football League (NFL) between the Minnesota Vikings and the Philadelphia Eagles. The game was played at Franklin Field in Philadelphia, Pennsylvania.

The incident occurred on December 15, 1968, the final week of the NFL season, with the struggling Eagles sitting at 2–11 on the season. Tied 7–7 at halftime, the team brought out a man dressed as Santa Claus as part of the halftime Christmas parade. Eagles fans, upset by the poor season, pelted him with snowballs.

The affair has gone down in NFL and sports lore as a representation of the passionate and sometimes overzealous behavior of Philadelphia sports fans.

== Background ==
The Eagles' 1968 season had been regarded as one of the worst in franchise history up until that point, with the team starting 0–11. Despite the lost season, fans had been hopeful of the team's chances to secure the first overall pick in the 1969 NFL/AFL draft and select Heisman-winning running back O. J. Simpson from USC. However, the Eagles won two straight games in weeks 12 and 13, putting them behind the 1–12–1 Buffalo Bills in the draft order. Some fans wore buttons to the game reading "Joe Must Go" in reference to head coach Joe Kuharich, and a plane with a banner circled the stadium with the same message.

In the game, the Eagles took an early 7–0 lead over the Vikings, much to the dismay of fans. At halftime, the game was tied 7–7.

== The incident ==
The night before the game at Franklin Field, there was a substantial snowstorm that left most of the stadium, including the seats, covered in snow. At kickoff, temperatures were in the low 20s (-4 to -6 °C) and wind gusts reached 30 miles per hour (48 km/h). The snowstorm prevented the Santa Claus actor that the Eagles had booked for the halftime Christmas pageant from arriving at the game. Eagles' entertainment director Bill "Moon" Mullen, needing someone to play Santa Claus during the halftime Christmas pageant, picked out Frank Olivo, a 20-year-old fan who was dressed as Santa Claus, to play the role. Olivo had a personal tradition of dressing as Santa Claus when he attended the last home regular season game of the year.

Olivo appeared at the underbelly of Franklin Field to the song "Here Comes Santa Claus" alongside a 50-piece band and Eagles cheerleaders dressed as elves. Olivo was supposed to appear on a large Christmas float featuring eight life-sized fiberglass reindeer, but the float got stuck in the mud, so Olivo was forced to appear in the Christmas pageant on foot. In place of carrying a Santa sack, Olivo carried an equipment bag filled with soggy towels. Philadelphia sports talk radio host Glen Macnow described the incident as "a bad game, it's a cold game, [the fans] are sitting their rear ends in snow and here comes this lousy, little Santa running down the field."

Olivo's cousin, who witnessed the spectacle, stated "[Olivo] comes out, the PA announcer goes through this big thing, 'Here comes Santa Claus. Let's give Santa Claus a rousing welcome, Philadelphia welcome' [and well]...all hell broke loose." Olivo began his appearance by throwing candy canes to the fans, but when he reached the endzone, fans started booing and throwing snowballs at him. Fans then soon started throwing other projectiles including beer bottles and hoagies at him. Olivo suspects that he was hit with more than 100 snowballs during his appearance. So many snowballs were thrown at Olivo that his fake white eyebrows, which were part of the costume, were knocked off. However, he took the pelting in jest, shouting at one fan "you're not getting anything for Christmas." Olivo later stated that he understood why fans were frustrated and that fans were not booing him, but instead the disappointing season. There is no known video of Eagles fans throwing snowballs at Olivo.

The Eagles' public relations director at the time, Jim Gallagher, said that Olivo "was the worst-looking Santa I'd ever seen. Bad suit, scraggly beard. I'm not sure whether he was drunk, but he appeared to be." However, Olivo contested that his costume was high quality and he was not drunk, but conceded his fake beard was poor quality.

== Aftermath ==
The Eagles would go on to lose the game, 24–17, ending their season with a 2–12 record. However, with the Buffalo Bills finishing with a 1–12–1 record, along with the Atlanta Falcons having a 2–12 record and winning a coin toss tiebreaker with the Eagles for the second overall pick, the Eagles would fall to selecting third in the 1969 NFL/AFL draft. O. J. Simpson, coveted by Eagles fans throughout the season, was selected by Buffalo and played 11 successful seasons in the NFL, being elected to the Pro Football Hall of Fame in 1985. The Eagles would end up drafting running back Leroy Keyes from Purdue, who would retroactively be considered a draft bust.

With the win against the Eagles and a loss by the Chicago Bears that same day, the Vikings clinched the NFL Central division, but went on to lose the Western Conference championship game to the Baltimore Colts and the Playoff Bowl to the Dallas Cowboys.

The incident itself did not immediately receive much attention, with little mention being given to it in The Philadelphia Inquirer and Philadelphia Bulletin. However, it gained national infamy after being mentioned by Howard Cosell on the ABC Weekend Report, with the incident being featured in lieu of game highlights. The next year, the Eagles offered Olivo a chance to be Santa Claus once again in the team's Christmas pageant, but he declined. Olivo was ultimately gifted football-shaped cufflinks and a tie tack by the team in appreciation of his services.

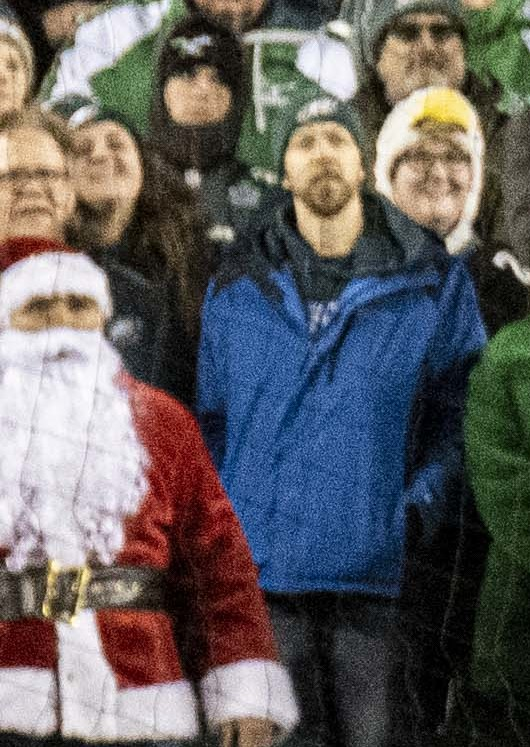
A fan dressed as Santa Claus during an Eagles game, which took place on the week of Christmas, in 2021

The incident is often used by the media as an example of the negative image surrounding Philadelphia sports fans, with outlets branding Philadelphia as "the town that booed Santa Claus." CBS Sports used the Santa Claus incident as an example for why Philadelphia sports fans are "the absolute worst." ESPN said that with the incident the city "cemented its reputation as the harshest place in sports" and it will go down as "a staple of Philadelphia history." SB Nation has said that "Philadelphia fans throwing snowballs at Santa Claus is a topic that can come up during any Eagles broadcast, and maybe even other professional Philly sports games, too." Some Eagles fans view the incident in an illustrious light as an example of the city's no-nonsense attitude about sports. Regarding the incident, Olivo said "It happened...years ago, you know, time to move on...It went away for a while, but every now and then you hear some guy on TV who only knows Philly for the cheesesteaks and the Liberty Bell talk about the time fans threw snowballs at Santa. It was cool to hear it back then when it went national and Howard Cosell is saying your name on TV, but today when you hear it, it's like, 'Shut up already.' "

In 2003, Olivo appeared at a Philadelphia 76ers game dressed as Santa Claus as part of a promotion to gather the most Santa Clauses in one location. Fans originally started cheering Olivo, but the cheers turned into a chorus of boos. In 2009, Olivo returned to an Eagles game dressed as Santa Claus.

Olivo died in 2015 at the age of 66.

== In popular culture ==
- In 2006, Philadelphia-based singer Chuck Brodsky released a song titled "The Great Santa Snowball Debacle of 1968".
- A book titled A Snowball's Chance: Philly Fires Back Against The National Media, which defended the Eagles fans' behavior in the incident, was published in 2012.
- In 2017, ESPN made a spoof 30 for 30 documentary about the incident.
- In a 2018 episode of It's Always Sunny In Philadelphia, Mac mentions the incident while he's talking about how Eagles fans are known for booing everything.
- Comedian Jim Gaffigan, in his 2018 standup special "Noble Ape," speaks about mentioning the incident when he introduced Pope Francis during his 2015 visit to Philadelphia. Gaffigan recalls how the crowd went silent and then 100,000 people booed him for bringing it up.
- The incident was featured as a question on Jeopardy! in 2021 and was correctly answered by 38-time champion Matt Amodio.

== See also ==
- List of nicknamed NFL games and plays
- NFL controversies
- 1968 NFL season
- 1968 Philadelphia Eagles season
