= Tom Woodeshick =

American football player (born 1941)

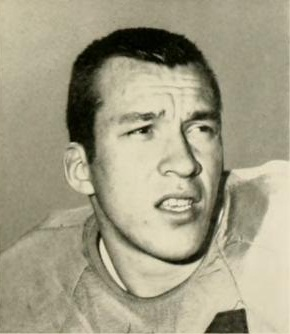
- Woodeshick from The Monticola, 1963

No. 37
- Position: Running back

Personal information
- Born: December 3, 1941 (age 84); Wilkes-Barre, Pennsylvania, U.S.
- Listed height: 6 ft 0 in (1.83 m)
- Listed weight: 225 lb (102 kg)

Career information
- College: West Virginia (1960–1962)
- NFL draft: 1963: 8th round, 102nd overall pick
- AFL draft: 1963: 4th round, 28th overall pick

Career history
- Philadelphia Eagles (1963–1971); St. Louis Cardinals (1972)

Awards and highlights
- Second-team All-Pro (1968); Pro Bowl (1968)

Career NFL statistics
- Rushing yards: 3,577
- Rushing average: 4.3
- Receptions: 126
- Receiving yards: 1,175
- Total touchdowns: 27
- Stats at Pro Football Reference

Thomas Woodeshick (/ˈwʊdəʃɪk/ WUUD-ə-shik; born December 3, 1941) is an American former professional football player who was a running back in the National Football League (NFL).

== Early life ==
Woodeshick was born on December 31, 1941, in Wilkes-Barre, Pennsylvania. He attended Hanover Township High School in Luzerne County, Pennsylvania, where he excelled as a linebacker and halfback on the school's football team. As a senior, the Wyoming Valley Football Conference coaches named him as a running back to the conference All-Star Team. In 1993, he was inducted into the Luzerne County Sports Hall of Fame.

== College football ==
Woodeshick played college football at West Virginia University (WVU) as a running back, from 1960–62. In his senior year, Woodeshick had 433 rushing yards, 141 receiving yards, and three touchdowns on an 8–2 team. Woodeshick was named All-Southern Conference, was chosen to play in the 1963 Senior Bowl and later was named a member of the 1960–69 WVU All-time football team. Over his WVU career, he had over 1,000 total yards rushing and receiving, along with 183 yards returning kickoffs. In 2013, he was inducted into WVU's Sports Hall of Fame. In 2016, he was an inaugural member of WVU’s Mountaineer Legends Society.

== Professional football ==
Woodeshick was selected by the Buffalo Bills in the fourth round of the 1963 American Football League (AFL) draft (28th overall), and by the Philadelphia Eagles in the eighth round of the 1963 NFL draft (102nd overall). He signed with both teams, resulting in a legal dispute. It was determined that the Bills contract was invalid because he signed before the AFL draft had occurred and therefore the Bills had no signing rights at the time. Woodeshick thought that this additional focus on him, and the fact that he outran Eagles star Timmy Brown in the 40-yard dash, gave him an increased opportunity to make the Eagles team.

From 1963–1965, Woodeshick was a backup running back, playing sparingly on offense and starting only one game. He was plagued by ankle injuries for most of the 1964 season. In 1966, he was given the opportunity to start four games and averaged 3.9 yards per carry in 85 rushing attempts. This was the only winning team he played for while an Eagle, with a 9–5 record, losing in the Playoff Bowl to the Baltimore Colts. He was nicknamed "Pocono Duke" by his teammates. He became a full-time starter at fullback in 1967, averaging 4.3 yards in 155 carries, with six rushing touchdowns; as well as having 34 receptions for 391 yards and four more touchdowns, with over 1,000 yards in total offense.

The Eagles had a very poor team in 1968. They began the season 0–11 and finished 2–12, the team owner was in bankruptcy, and a notoriously difficult fan base was very hostile toward the team. Woodeshick was a rare bright spot on the team. He rushed for 947 yards at 4.4 yards per carry, and had 36 receptions for another 328 yards. He was selected to the Pro Bowl and was named second-team All-Pro by the Associated Press (AP). He was third in the league in rushing behind Leroy Kelly and Ken Willard.

Woodeshick regretted he was not able to rush for 1,000 yards that year. Woodeshick had played in a game that year with a flu so severe that he lost 15 pounds in a week, though he was not as effective as normal. In the final game of the season, he needed another 133 yards against the Minnesota Vikings to reach 1,000 yards. By the third quarter he had gained 80 yards and needed only 53 more.

Woodeshick did not finish the game. He had to leave the game in the third quarter with an injury that required ten or twenty stitches above his right eye. Playing in a more violent era, one defender had held Woodeshick upright while Vikings middle linebacker Lonnie Warwick rammed his helmet into Woodeshick's facemask, which shattered and cut Woodeshick, with blood pouring from the ensuing would. The injury looked severe enough that Woodeshick heard one Vikings player say Woodeshick had lost an eye. He was assisted from the field with his eyes covered in bandages, and he never returned to finish the game. He asked the team doctor to stitch up the injury so he could return to the game, and the doctor responded "'Are you crazy? You can't play in your condition.'"

This was also the infamous game where some Philadelphia fans frustrated with the team's failures and coach Joe Kuharich threw snow balls at man dressed a Santa Claus during half-time, and then later at Kuharich during the second half.

Woodeshick was second-team All-Pro again in 1969 (per the AP, United Press International, and Pro Football Weekly), rushing for 831 yards at 4.5 yards per carry, with 22 receptions. He was also named first-team All-Conference by The Sporting News. He only played in 12 games that year, as he tore his ankle in the second-to-last game of the season, which began a physical demise for him. He was still fifth in the league in rushing yards that year, even missing two games.

In the early 1970s he was hampered by knee injuries. He was only able to play in six games in 1970, but averaged less than 10 rushing attempts per game; and in 1971 he played in 11 games, starting only five, with 66 rushing attempts at an abysmal 2.8 yards per carry. Woodeshick had knee surgery in 1972, and he was cut by the Eagles just before the start of the 1972 regular season, when the Eagles decided to use other running backs after Woodeshick was hampered by injuries early in training camp. He said at the time of being cut:

I'm extremely bitter. There's no avoiding it. I wanted to go out like a pro and a champion. Not so much for myself but for the fans here. Nobody deserves a winner more than they do.

The St. Louis Cardinals picked him up in 1972, but he played in only 4 games with 5 rushing attempts. He retired from the game that year.

Over his career, Woodeshick rushed for 3,577 yards on 836 carries (4.3 yards per carry), had 1,175 yards receiving on 126 receptions (9.3 yards per catch), with 27 touchdowns.

In a 2007 sportswriter poll, Woodeshick was listed as the 47th greatest all-time Eagle player by the Philadelphia Inquirer. Sports Illustrated deemed him the best Eagle to wear number 37.

== NFL career statistics ==
Legend
**Bold**	Career high

Year	Team	Games		Rushing					Receiving				
Year	Team	GP	GS	Att	Yds	Avg	Lng	TD	Rec	Yds	Avg	Lng	TD
1963	PHI	14	0	5	18	3.6	11	0	1	−3	−3.0	−3	0
1964	PHI	13	1	37	180	4.9	13	2	4	12	3.0	8	0
1965	PHI	13	0	28	145	**5.2**	14	0	6	86	**14.3**	**60**	0
1966	PHI	14	4	85	330	3.9	21	4	10	118	11.8	44	1
1967	PHI	14	13	155	670	4.3	41	**6**	34	**391**	11.5	43	**4**
1968	PHI	14	14	**217**	**947**	4.4	54	3	**36**	328	9.1	55	0
1969	PHI	12	12	186	831	4.5	21	4	22	177	8.0	15	0
1970	PHI	6	6	52	254	4.9	**57**	2	6	28	4.7	10	0
1971	PHI	11	5	66	188	2.8	19	0	6	36	6.0	11	1
1972	STL	4	0	5	14	2.8	6	0	1	2	2.0	2	0
Career		115	55	836	3,577	4.3	57	21	126	1,175	9.3	60	6

== Personal life ==
He had received his Bachelor's degree from WVU in 1963, and later attended graduate school in Philadelphia at the University of Pennsylvania and Temple University. During his off-seasons, Woodeshick attended night courses at the Wharton School of Finance of the University of Pennsylvania. He was inducted into the Pennsylvania Sports Hall of Fame in 2002. He is also a popular public speaker.

After retirement, Woodeshick was a broadcaster for the Philadelphia Bell of the short-lived World Football League, was a columnist for the Philadelphia Inquirer, and had two years coaching at Moravian College.

He has also owned a restaurant, worked as a stockbroker, and in the casino marketing business.

He made an uncredited appearance as a member of the 325th Evac in the climactic football game in the film M*A*S*H, where he and former Eagle teammate Jack Concannon are shown passing a joint. Eagles great Timmy Brown, whom Woodeshick had bested in the 40-yard dash years earlier, was also in the movie, but as one of the stars.

Year	Title	Role	Notes
1970	M*A*S*H	Football Player – 325th Evac.	Uncredited
