= 1968 Minnesota Vikings season =

NFL team season

- General manager: Jim Finks
- Head coach: Bud Grant
- Home stadium: Metropolitan Stadium

Results
- Record: 8–6
- Division place: 1st NFL Central
- Playoffs: Lost Western Conference Championship Game (at Colts) 14–24; Lost NFL Playoff Bowl (vs. Cowboys) 13–17
- All-Pros: DE Carl Eller (1st team); C Mick Tingelhoff (1st team); FB Bill Brown (2nd team); S Paul Krause (2nd team)
- Pro Bowlers: DE Carl Eller; C Mick Tingelhoff; FB Bill Brown; DT Alan Page; DE Jim Marshall

Uniform
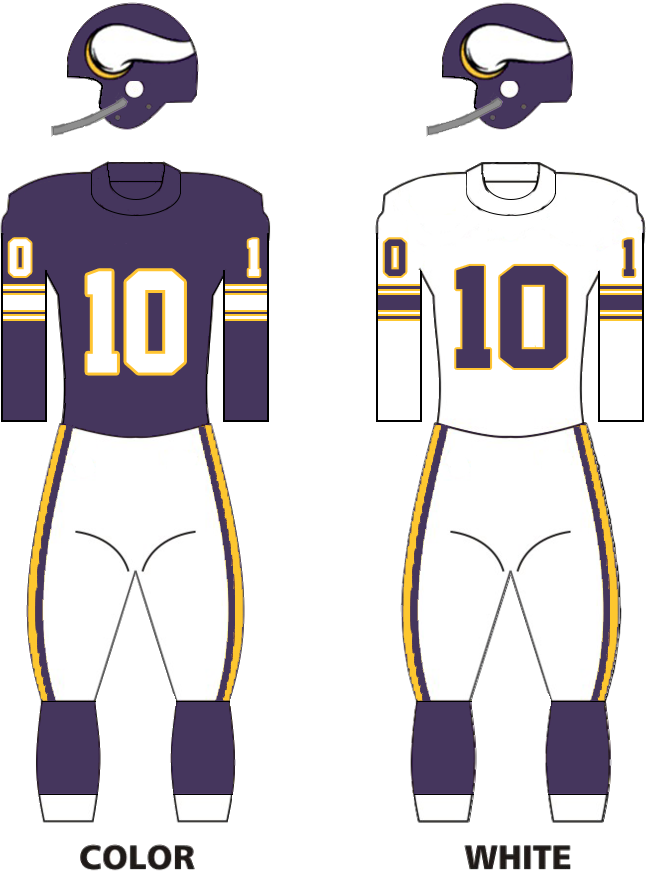

The 1968 season was the Minnesota Vikings' eighth in the National Football League. In their second year under head coach Bud Grant, the Vikings won the NFL Central division title with an 8–6 record, and qualified for the postseason for the first time in franchise history. This was the first of four consecutive division titles for the Vikings. The Vikings' first trip to the playoffs saw them suffer a 24–14 loss in the Western Conference Championship Game to the eventual NFL champion and Super Bowl runner-up Baltimore Colts at Baltimore's Memorial Stadium. In the Playoff Bowl two weeks later, they again lost to the Dallas Cowboys 17–13.

== Offseason ==
=== 1968 draft ===
| Hall of Famer |

1968 Minnesota Vikings Draft
| Draft order | | Player name | Position | College | Notes |
| Round | Selection | Player name | Position | College | Notes |
|---|---|---|---|---|---|
| 1 | 1 | Ron Yary | Offensive tackle | USC | from Giants (Note: The Vikings traded QB Fran Tarkenton to the Giants in exchange for a first- (1st overall), a 1967 first- (2nd overall), a 1967 second- (28th overall) and a 1969 second-round selection (39th overall).) |
| 1 | 7 | Traded to the New Orleans Saints (Note: The Vikings traded their first-round (7th overall) and their 1969 first-round selection (17th overall) to the Saints in exchange for QB Gary Cuozzo.) | | | |
| 2 | 33 | Charlie West | Cornerback | UTEP | |
| 3 | 61 | Traded to the Pittsburgh Steelers (Note: The Vikings traded their third-round selection (61st overall) to the Steelers in exchange for CB Brady Keys.) | | | |
| 3 | 76 | Mike McGill | Linebacker | Notre Dame | from Cowboys (Note: The Vikings traded WR Lance Rentzel to the Cowboys in exchange for a third-round selection (76th overall).) |
| 4 | 89 | Mike Freeman | Defensive back | Fresno State | |
| 5 | 117 | Traded to the Washington Redskins (Note: The Vikings traded their fifth-round selection (117th overall) to the Redskins in exchange for OT Bob Breitenstein.) | | | |
| 6 | 144 | Bob Goodridge | Wide receiver | Vanderbilt | |
| 7 | 167 | Oscar Reed | Wide receiver | Colorado State | from Falcons (Note: The Vikings traded QB Ron Vander Kelen to the Falcons in exchange for a seventh-round selection (167th overall).) |
| 7 | 171 | Lenny Snow | Running back | Georgia Tech | |
| 8 | 198 | Hank Urbanowicz | Defensive tackle | Miami (FL) | |
| 9 | 225 | Mike Donohoe | Tight end | San Francisco | |
| 10 | 250 | Tom Sakal | Defensive back | Minnesota | |
| 11 | 279 | Bill Haas | Wide receiver | Nebraska–Omaha | |
| 12 | 308 | Howie Small | Center | Rhode Island | |
| 13 | 333 | Dick Wherry | Wide receiver | Northern State | |
| 14 | 360 | Don Evans | Offensive tackle | Arkansas AM&N | |
| 15 | 387 | Jim Haynie | Quarterback | West Chester | |
| 16 | 414 | Lary Kuharich | Defensive back | Boston College | |
| 17 | 441 | Bob Lee | Quarterback | Pacific | |
| 17 | 445 | Bill Hull | Guard | Tennessee Tech | from Lions (Note: The Vikings traded a 1969 16th-round selection (407th overall) to the Lions in exchange for a 17th-round selection (445th overall).) |

=== Undrafted free agents ===
1968 undrafted free agents of note
| Player | Position | College |
|---|---|---|
| Ralph Galloway | Tackle | Southern Illinois |
| Gayle Knief | Wide receiver | Morningside |
| Ron Oswalt | Lineback | Drake |
| Jeff Steinberger | Defensive end | Monmouth (Illinois) |

== Roster ==
1968 Minnesota Vikings roster
| Quarterbacks (QB): 15 Gary Cuozzo; 11 Joe Kapp; Running backs (RB): 30 Bill Brown; 28 Earl Denny; 26 Clinton Jones; 21 Jim Lindsey; 41 Dave Osborn; Wide receivers (WR): 27 Bob Grim; 86 Tom Hall; 80 John Henderson; 84 Gene Washington; Tight ends (TE): 87 John Beasley; 85 Billy Martin P | Offensive linemen (OL): 67 Grady Alderman T; 66 Bookie Bolin G; 71 Doug Davis T; 64 Milt Sunde G; 53 Mick Tingelhoff C; 63 Jim Vellone G; 73 Ron Yary T; Defensive linemen (DL): 76 Paul Dickson DT; 81 Carl Eller DE; 77 Gary Larsen DT; 70 Jim Marshall DE; 88 Alan Page DT; 74 Steve Smith DE | Linebackers (LB): 58 Wally Hilgenberg OLB; 36 John Kirby OLB; 55 Mike McGill MLB; 59 Lonnie Warwick MLB; 60 Roy Winston OLB; Defensive backs (DB): 20 Bobby Bryant CB; 49 Dale Hackbart FS; 29 Karl Kassulke SS; 22 Paul Krause FS; 46 Earsell Mackbee CB; 45 Ed Sharockman CB; 40 Charlie West SS; Special teams (ST): 14 Fred Cox K; 10 King Hill P | Practice squad: -- Chet Anderson TE; 82 Bob Goodridge WR; -- Gayle Knief WR; 19 Bob Lee QB; -- Jerry Mazzanti DE; 32 Oscar Reed RB; Reserve: -- Gene Beard CB (Military); 61 Larry Bowie G (IR); -- Don Hansen LB Retired; 50 Jim Hargrove LB (Military); -- Tom Sakal S (Military); Rookies in italics |

== Preseason ==
| Week | Date | Opponent | Result | Record | Venue | Attendance |
|---|---|---|---|---|---|---|
| 1 | August 10 | Kansas City Chiefs (AFL) | L 10–13 | 0–1 | Metropolitan Stadium | 46,228 |
| 2 | August 17 | at Denver Broncos (AFL) | W 39–16 | 1–1 | University of Denver Stadium | 20,901 |
| 3 | August 24 | Philadelphia Eagles | W 52–10 | 2–1 | Metropolitan Stadium | 41,229 |
| 4 | September 1 | at St. Louis Cardinals | L 28–31 | 2–2 | Busch Memorial Stadium | 25,233 |
| 5 | September 6 | New Orleans Saints | W 20–17 | 3–2 | State Fair Stadium (Shreveport, LA) | 23,000 |

== Regular season ==
=== Schedule ===
| Week | Date | Opponent | Result | Record | Venue | Attendance |
|---|---|---|---|---|---|---|
| 1 | September 14 | Atlanta Falcons | **W** 47–7 | 1–0 | Metropolitan Stadium | 45,563 |
| 2 | September 22 | at **Green Bay Packers** | **W** 26–13 | 2–0 | Milwaukee County Stadium | 49,346 |
| 3 | September 29 | **Chicago Bears** | **L** 17–27 | 2–1 | Metropolitan Stadium | 47,644 |
| 4 | October 6 | **Detroit Lions** (Note: This game was originally scheduled to be played in Detroit, but was switched with the November 17 game due to game 4 of the World Series.) | **W** 24–10 | 3–1 | Metropolitan Stadium | 44,289 |
| 5 | October 13 | at New Orleans Saints | **L** 17–20 | 3–2 | Tulane Stadium | 71,105 |
| 6 | October 20 | Dallas Cowboys | **L** 7–20 | 3–3 | Metropolitan Stadium | 47,644 |
| 7 | October 27 | at **Chicago Bears** | **L** 24–26 | 3–4 | Wrigley Field | 46,562 |
| 8 | November 3 | Washington Redskins | **W** 27–14 | 4–4 | Metropolitan Stadium | 47,644 |
| 9 | November 10 | **Green Bay Packers** | **W** 14–10 | 5–4 | Metropolitan Stadium | 47,644 |
| 10 | November 17 | at **Detroit Lions** | **W** 13–6 | 6–4 | Tiger Stadium | 48,654 |
| 11 | November 24 | at Baltimore Colts | **L** 9–21 | 6–5 | Memorial Stadium | 60,238 |
| 12 | December 1 | Los Angeles Rams | **L** 3–31 | 6–6 | Metropolitan Stadium | 47,644 |
| 13 | December 8 | at San Francisco 49ers | **W** 30–20 | 7–6 | Kezar Stadium | 29,049 |
| 14 | December 15 | at Philadelphia Eagles | **W** 24–17 | 8–6 | Franklin Field | 54,530 |
Note: Intra-division opponents are in **bold** text.

=== Game summaries ===
==== Week 11: at Baltimore Colts ====
Minnesota Vikings (6–4) at Baltimore Colts (9–1) – Game summary

| Quarter | 1 | 2 | 3 | 4 | Total |
|---|---|---|---|---|---|
| Vikings | 0 | 3 | 3 | 3 | **9** |
| **Colts** | 7 | 14 | 0 | 0 | **21** |

at Memorial Stadium, Baltimore, Maryland

- Date: November 24, 1968
- Game time: 1:00 p.m.
- Game weather: 50 °F or 10 °C
- TV: CBS
- Pro-Football-Reference.com

Game information

**First quarter**

- BAL – Terry Cole 1-yard rush (Lou Michaels kick). Colts 7–0

**Second quarter**

- BAL – Willie Richardson 39-yard pass from Earl Morrall (Lou Michaels kick). Colts 14–0
- BAL – Tom Mitchell 18-yard pass from Earl Morrall (Lou Michaels kick). Colts 21–0
- MIN – Fred Cox 43-yard field goal. Colts 21–3

**Third quarter**

- MIN – Fred Cox 36-yard field goal. Colts 21–6

**Fourth quarter**

- MIN – Fred Cox 31-yard field goal. Colts 21–9

**Top passers**

- BAL – Earl Morrall – 17/24, 259 yards, 2 TD, 2 INT
- MIN – Gary Cuozzo – 12/18, 141 yards

**Top rushers**

- BAL – Terry Cole – 20 rushes, 71 yards, TD
- MIN – Clinton Jones – 10 rushes, 53 yards

**Top receivers**

- BAL – Willie Richardson – 6 receptions, 150 yards, TD
- MIN – John Beasley – 6 receptions, 79 yards

This was the last occasion the Colts hosted the Vikings in the regular season until 2000, seventeen years after they had relocated to Indianapolis. The intervening gap of 31 seasons constitutes the second-longest gap without one team visiting another in NFL history. (Note: Tampa Bay did not play at Buffalo until 2009, although the Buccaneers joined the league 33 seasons previously.)

== Standings ==
NFL Central
| | W | L | T | PCT | DIV | CONF | PF | PA | STK |
|---|---|---|---|---|---|---|---|---|---|
| Minnesota Vikings | 8 | 6 | 0 | .571 | 4–2 | 6–4 | 282 | 242 | W2 |
| Chicago Bears | 7 | 7 | 0 | .500 | 3–3 | 5–5 | 250 | 333 | L1 |
| Green Bay Packers | 6 | 7 | 1 | .462 | 1–4–1 | 2–7–1 | 281 | 227 | W1 |
| Detroit Lions | 4 | 8 | 2 | .333 | 3–2–1 | 4–5–1 | 207 | 241 | L1 |

Note: Tie games were not officially counted in the standings until 1972.

== Playoffs ==
| Round | Date | Opponent | Result | Record | Venue | Attendance |
|---|---|---|---|---|---|---|
| Conference | December 22 | at Baltimore Colts | L 14–24 | 0–1 | Memorial Stadium | 60,238 |
| Playoff Bowl | January 5 | Dallas Cowboys | L 13–17 | 0–2 | Miami Orange Bowl | 22,961 |

=== Conference Playoff: at Baltimore Colts ===
Minnesota Vikings (8–6) at Baltimore Colts (13–1) – Game summary

| Quarter | 1 | 2 | 3 | 4 | Total |
|---|---|---|---|---|---|
| Vikings | 0 | 0 | 0 | 14 | 14 |
| Colts | 0 | 7 | 14 | 3 | 24 |

at Memorial Stadium, Baltimore, Maryland

- Date: December 22, 1968
- Game time: 1:00 p.m.
- Game weather: 33 °F (1 °C)
- TV: CBS
- Pro-Football-Reference.com

Game information

First quarter

- No scoring plays.

Second quarter

- BAL – Tom Mitchell 3-yard pass from Earl Morrall (Lou Michaels kick). Colts 7–0

Third quarter

- BAL – John Mackey 49-yard pass from Earl Morrall (Lou Michaels kick). Colts 14–0
- BAL – Mike Curtis 60-yard defensive fumble return (Lou Michaels kick). Colts 21–0

Fourth quarter

- MIN – Billy Martin 1-yard pass from Joe Kapp (Fred Cox kick). Colts 21–7
- BAL – Lou Michaels 33-yard field goal. Colts 24–7
- MIN – Bill Brown 7-yard pass from Joe Kapp (Fred Cox kick). Colts 24–14

Top passers

- BAL – Earl Morrall – 13/22, 280 yards, 2 TD, INT
- MIN – Joe Kapp – 26/44, 287 yards, 2 TD, 2 INT

Top rushers

- BAL – Tom Matte – 14 rushes, 31 yards
- MIN – Joe Kapp – 10 rushes, 52 yards

Top receivers

- BAL – Willie Richardson – 6 receptions, 148 yards
- MIN – Gene Washington – 5 receptions, 95 yards

Four weeks after their last regular-season visit to the Colts for 32 years, the Vikings' first ever playoff appearance saw them return to play the Colts in their only postseason meeting.

== Statistics ==
=== Team leaders ===
| Category | Player(s) | Value |
|---|---|---|
| Passing yards | Joe Kapp | 1,695 |
| Passing touchdowns | Joe Kapp | 10 |
| Rushing yards | Bill Brown | 805 |
| Rushing touchdowns | Bill Brown | 11 |
| Receiving yards | Gene Washington | 756 |
| Receiving touchdowns | Gene Washington | 6 |
| Points | Fred Cox | 88 |
| Kickoff return yards | Charlie West | 576 |
| Punt return yards | Charlie West | 201 |
| Interceptions | Paul Krause | 7 |

=== League rankings ===
| Category | Total yards | Yards per game | NFL rank (out of 16) |
|---|---|---|---|
| Passing offense | 1,685 | 120.4 | 15th |
| Rushing offense | 1,921 | 137.2 | 6th |
| Total offense | 3,606 | 257.6 | 14th |
| Passing defense | 1,855 | 132.5 | 3rd |
| Rushing defense | 1,903 | 135.9 | 11th |
| Total defense | 3,758 | 268.4 | 5th |
