= 1968 New York Giants season =

NFL team season

- Head coach: Allie Sherman
- Home stadium: Yankee Stadium

Results
- Record: 7–7
- Division place: 2nd NFL Capitol
- Playoffs: Did not qualify

The 1968 New York Giants season was the franchise's 44th season in the National Football League (NFL). For the 1968 season, the Giants traded divisions with the New Orleans Saints, with the Giants moving from the Century Division to the Capitol Division. The Giants finished with a 7–7 record, which placed them second in the Capitol Division, five games behind the Dallas Cowboys.

The Giants did not have a first-round selection in the 1968 NFL/AFL draft; their first pick was Rich Buzin, taken in the second round with the 41st overall pick. New York began the season with a four-game winning streak. After a four-game stretch in which they had three losses, the Giants went to Dallas and posted an upset victory, 27–21. With that win and a victory against the Philadelphia Eagles the following week, the Giants moved into contention for a Capitol Division championship. However, they lost the final four games of the season. The 1968 regular season was Allie Sherman's last as head coach of the Giants; he was fired after the preseason in 1969.

== Offseason ==
=== NFL draft ===
1968 New York Giants draft
Round	Pick	Player	Position	College	Notes
2	41	Rich Buzin	Offensive tackle	Penn State	
3	70	Bobby Duhon	Running back	Tulane	
7	180	Doug Chatman	Defensive end	Jackson State	
Made roster

== Roster ==
1968 New York Giants roster
Quarterbacks (QB): 15 Gary Lane; 10 Fran Tarkenton; 19 Gary Wood; Running backs (RB): 22 Ronnie Blye; 28 Bobby Duhon; 24 Tucker Frederickson; 23 Ernie Koy P; Wide receivers (WR): 89 Bobby Crespino; 45 Homer Jones; 47 Joe Koontz; 40 Joe Morrison; Tight ends (TE): 88 Aaron Thomas; 86 Butch Wilson	Offensive linemen (OL): 77 Rich Buzin T; 65 Pete Case G; 62 Darrell Dess G; 64 Andy Gross G; 61 Charlie Harper T/G; 59 Chuck Hinton C; 53 Greg Larson C; 63 Doug Van Horn G; 69 Willie Young T; Defensive linemen (DL): 79 Bruce Anderson DE; 73 Roger Anderson DT; 82 McKinley Boston DE; 75 Jim Katcavage DE; 71 Bob Lurtsema DT; 72 Sam Silas DT	Linebackers (LB): 54 Ken Avery OLB; 83 Barry Brown OLB; 58 Mike Ciccolella MLB; 56 Tommy Joe Crutcher OLB; 66 Henry Davis MLB; Defensive backs (DB): 20 Scott Eaton CB; 49 Jim Holifield CB/S; 43 Spider Lockhart FS; 21 Bruce Maher SS; 81 Freeman White SS; 41 Willie Williams CB; Special teams (ST): 3 Pete Gogolak K	Practice squad: 46 Dave Hathcock S; 30 Allen Jacobs RB; 26 Kenny Parker CB; -- Larry Suchy CB; Reserve: -- Doug Chatman DE (IR); 57 Vince Costello LB (IR); 27 Randy Minniear RB (IR); 78 Steve Wright T (IR); Rookies in italics

== Schedule ==
Week	Date	Opponent	Result	Record	Venue	Attendance
1	September 15	at Pittsburgh Steelers	**W** 34–20	1–0	Pitt Stadium	45,698
2	September 22	at **Philadelphia Eagles**	**W** 34–25	2–0	Franklin Field	60,858
3	September 29	**Washington Redskins**	**W** 48–21	3–0	Yankee Stadium	62,797
4	October 6	New Orleans Saints	**W** 38–21	4–0	Yankee Stadium	60,967
5	October 15	at Atlanta Falcons	**L** 21–24	4–1	Atlanta Stadium	49,962
6	October 20	San Francisco 49ers	**L** 10–26	4–2	Yankee Stadium	62,958
7	October 27	at **Washington Redskins**	**W** 13–10	5–2	D.C. Stadium	50,839
8	November 3	Baltimore Colts	**L** 0–26	5–3	Yankee Stadium	62,973
9	November 10	at **Dallas Cowboys**	**W** 27–21	6–3	Cotton Bowl	72,163
10	November 17	**Philadelphia Eagles**	**W** 7–6	7–3	Yankee Stadium	62,896
11	November 24	at Los Angeles Rams	**L** 21–24	7–4	Los Angeles Memorial Coliseum	68,534
12	December 1	at Cleveland Browns	**L** 10–45	7–5	Cleveland Municipal Stadium	83,193
13	December 8	St. Louis Cardinals	**L** 21–28	7–6	Yankee Stadium	62,709
14	December 15	**Dallas Cowboys**	**L** 10–28	7–7	Yankee Stadium	62,617
Note: Intra-division opponents are in **bold** text.

== Standings ==
NFL Capitol
	W	L	T	PCT	DIV	CONF	PF	PA	STK
Dallas Cowboys	12	2	0	.857	5–1	9–1	431	186	W5
New York Giants	7	7	0	.500	5–1	7–3	294	325	L4
Washington Redskins	5	9	0	.357	2–4	3–7	249	358	W1
Philadelphia Eagles	2	12	0	.143	0–6	1–9	202	351	L1

Note: Tie games were not officially counted in the standings until 1972.
