= 1968 Detroit Lions season =

NFL team season

- Head coach: Joe Schmidt
- Home stadium: Tiger Stadium

Results
- Record: 4–8–2
- Division place: 4th NFL Central
- Playoffs: Did not qualify

The 1968 Detroit Lions season was their 39th in the league. The team failed to improve on their previous season's output of 5–7–2, winning only four games. They missed the playoffs for the eleventh straight season.

== NFL draft ==
1968 Detroit Lions draft
Round	Pick	Player	Position	College	Notes
1	11	Greg Landry *	QB	Massachusetts	
1	24	Earl McCullouch	WR	USC	from Los Angeles
2	37	Jerry DePoyster	K	Wyoming	
3	74	Charlie Sanders * ^{†}	TE	Minnesota	from Los Angeles
4	93	Ed Mooney	LB	Texas Tech	
5	120	Phil Odle	WR	BYU	
6	148	Mike Spitzer	DE	San Jose State	
8	202	Terry Miller	LB	Illinois	
9	229	Greg Barton	QB	Tulsa	
10	256	Granville Liggins	LB	Oklahoma	
11	283	Dwight Little	G	Kentucky	
12	310	Ed Caruthers	DB	Arizona	
13	337	Chuck Bailey	OT	Cal State-Humboldt	
14	364	Richie Davis	WR	Upsala	
15	391	Jim Oliver	RB	Colorado State	
16	418	Bob Rokita	DE	Arizona State	
Made roster † Pro Football Hall of Fame * Made at least one Pro Bowl during career

Notes

- Detroit traded DT Roger Brown to Los Angeles in exchange for the Rams' first- and third-round selections (24th and 74th) and second-round selection in 1969.
- Detroit traded its third-round selection (65th) and fourth-round selection in 1969 to San Francisco in exchange for RB David Kopay.
- Detroit traded its seventeenth-round selection (445th) to Minnesota in exchange for Minnesota's sixteenth-round selection in 1969.

== Personnel ==
=== Staff / Coaches ===
1968 Detroit Lions staff
Front office: Owner - William Clay Ford, Sr.; Vice President / General manager - Russ Thomas; Executive Vice President - Edwin J. Anderson; Treasurer - Newton S. Peters; Publicity Director / Business Manager - Lyall Smith; Assistant Publicity Director - Elliott Trumbull; Equipment manager - Roy Marklem; Assistant equipment manager - Charles "Rip" Collins; Head coaches: Head coach – Joe Schmidt; Offensive coaches: Offensive Coordinator / Backs - Bill McPeak; Offensive Line - Chuck Knox; Wide Receivers - Johnny North	Defensive coaches: Defensive Coordinator / Secondary - Jim David; Defensive Line / Linebackers - Jim Martin; Strength and conditioning: Trainer - Kent Falb; Assistant Trainer - Dave Smith

=== Final roster ===
1968 Detroit Lions roster
Quarterbacks: 14 Greg Barton; 19 Bill Munson; Running backs: 21 Mike Campbell; 40 Nick Eddy; 43 Dave Kopay; 35 Tom Nowatzke; 38 Bill Triplett; Wide receivers: 3 Billy Gambrell; 81 Bill Malinchak; 25 Earl McCullouch; 23 Phil Odle; Tight ends: 80 Jim Gibbons; 88 Charlie Sanders	Offensive linemen: 52 Bill Cottrell C; 79 Charlie Bradshaw T; 54 Ed Flanagan C; 76 Rocky Freitas T; 68 Frank Gallagher G; 66 Bob Kowalkowski G; 73 Roger Shoals T; 63 Chuck Walton G; Defensive linemen: 78 John Baker DE; 85 Lew Kamanu DE; 71 Alex Karras DT; 85 Greg Kent DT; 70 Denis Moore DE; 82 Jerry Rush DT	Linebackers: 53 Mike Lucci MLB; 62 Ed Mooney OLB; 50 Paul Naumoff OLB; 55 Wayne Walker OLB; 51 Bill Swain MLB; Defensive backs: 20 Lem Barney CB; 44 Dick LeBeau CB; 47 Wayne Rasmussen FS; 27 Bobby Thompson CB; 48 Tom Vaughn FS; 28 Mike Weger SS; 46 Jim Welch SS; Special teams: 15 Jerry DePoyster K/P	Reserve lists: 24 Mel Farr RB (IR); 75 John Gordy T (IR); 74 Larry Hand DE (IR); 57 Terry Miller LB (Left squad); 84 Joe Robb DE (IR); 61 Chuck Sieminski DT (IR); Taxi squad: 72 Chuck Bailey T; 26 Mike Bass CB; 29 Henry Carr S; 11 Greg Landry QB; 45 Bobby Williams CB; 1 Garo Yepremian K; Note: rookies in italics

== Schedule ==
Week	Date	Opponent	Result	Record	Venue	Attendance
1	September 15	at Dallas Cowboys	**L** 13–59	0–1	Cotton Bowl	61,382
2	September 22	Chicago Bears	**W** 42–0	1–1	Tiger Stadium	50,688
3	September 29	at Green Bay Packers	**W** 23–17	2–1	Lambeau Field	50,681
4	October 6	at Minnesota Vikings	**L** 10–24	2–2	Metropolitan Stadium	44,289
5	October 13	at Chicago Bears	**W** 28–10	3–2	Wrigley Field	46,996
6	October 20	Green Bay Packers	**T** 14–14	3–2–1	Tiger Stadium	57,302
7	October 27	San Francisco 49ers	**L** 7–14	3–3–1	Tiger Stadium	53,555
8	November 3	at Los Angeles Rams	**L** 7–10	3–4–1	Los Angeles Memorial Coliseum	77,982
9	November 10	Baltimore Colts	**L** 10–27	3–5–1	Tiger Stadium	55,170
10	November 17	Minnesota Vikings	**L** 6–13	3–6–1	Tiger Stadium	46,654
11	November 24	New Orleans Saints	**T** 20–20	3–6–2	Tiger Stadium	46,152
12	November 28	Philadelphia Eagles	**L** 0–12	3–7–2	Tiger Stadium	47,909
13	December 8	at Atlanta Falcons	**W** 24–7	4–7–2	Atlanta Stadium	49,437
14	December 15	at Washington Redskins	**L** 3–14	4–8–2	D.C. Stadium	50,123
Note: Intra-division opponents are in **bold** text.

Note: The October 6 game against Minnesota was originally scheduled to be played in Detroit. The game was switched with the November 17 game due to game 4 of the World Series.

== Season summary ==
=== Week 5 ===
Team	1	2	3	4	Total
• Lions	7	7	7	7	28
Bears	7	3	0	0	10

- Date: October 13
- Location: Wrigley Field, Chicago
- Game weather: 67 °F (19 °C), wind 9 mph

Scoring summary
1	DET	Mel Farr 32 yard pass from Bill Munson (Jerry DePoyster kick)	Lions 7–0
1	CHI	Cecil Turner 80 yard pass from Larry Rakestraw (Mac Percival kick)	Tie 7–7
2	DET	Mel Farr 9 yard run (Jerry DePoyster kick)	Lions 14–7
2	CHI	Mac Percival 33 yard field goal	Lions 14–10
3	DET	Mel Farr 1 yard run (Jerry DePoyster kick)	Lions 21–10
4	DET	Tom Nowatzke 1 yard run (Jerry DePoyster kick)	Lions 28–10

== Standings ==
NFL Central
	W	L	T	PCT	DIV	CONF	PF	PA	STK
Minnesota Vikings	8	6	0	.571	4–2	6–4	282	242	W2
Chicago Bears	7	7	0	.500	3–3	5–5	250	333	L1
Green Bay Packers	6	7	1	.462	1–4–1	2–7–1	281	227	W1
Detroit Lions	4	8	2	.333	3–2–1	4–5–1	207	241	L1

Note: Tie games were not officially counted in the standings until 1972.
