= John Harper (linebacker, born 1946) =

Canadian football player (born 1946)

Profile
- Position: Linebacker

Personal information
- Born: 1946 (age 79–80)
- Listed height: 6 ft 3 in (1.91 m)
- Listed weight: 250 lb (113 kg)

Career information
- College: Adams State
- NFL draft: 1968: 7th round, 168th overall pick

Career history
- 1969–1970: Edmonton Eskimos

John Harper (born 1946) is a Canadian football player who played for the Edmonton Eskimos.
