= Jim Fetherston =

American football player (born 1945)

No. 61
- Position: Linebacker

Personal information
- Born: June 1, 1945 (age 81); Modesto, California, U.S.
- Listed height: 6 ft 2 in (1.88 m)
- Listed weight: 225 lb (102 kg)

Career information
- High school: Turlock (Turlock, California)
- College: California
- NFL draft: 1968: undrafted

Career history
- San Diego Chargers (1968-1969)

Career AFL statistics
- Fumble recoveries: 1
- Interceptions: 1
- Stats at Pro Football Reference

Jim Fetherston (born June 1, 1945) is an American former professional football player who was a linebacker for the San Diego Chargers of the American Football League (AFL) from 1968 to 1969. He played college football for the California Golden Bears.
