= 1968 Washington Redskins season =

NFL team season

- Owner: George Preston Marshall
- General manager: Otto Graham
- President: Edward Bennett Williams
- Head coach: Otto Graham
- Home stadium: D.C. Stadium

Results
- Record: 5–9
- Division place: 3rd NFL Capitol
- Playoffs: Did not qualify

The 1968 Washington Redskins season was the franchise's 37th season in the National Football League (NFL) and their 32nd in Washington, D.C. In their third and final year under head coach Otto Graham, the team finished 5–9, failing to improve on their 5–6–3 record from 1967.

With two years remaining on a five-year contract (and an option for another five years), Graham was displaced by Vince Lombardi in early February 1969.

== Offseason ==
=== NFL draft ===
Round	Pick	Player	Position	School/Club team

=== Undrafted free agents ===
1968 undrafted free agents of note
Player	Position	College
Bob Leach	Linebacker	Maryville

== Roster ==
1968 Washington Redskins roster
Quarterbacks (QB): 9 Sonny Jurgensen; 11 Jim Ninowski; 17 Harry Theofiledes; Running backs (RB): 20 Gerry Allen; 16 Gary Beban; 26 Bob Brunet; 24 Pete Larson; 32 Ray McDonald; 44 Steve Thurlow; 25 A. D. Whitfield; Wide receivers (WR): 49 Bobby Mitchell; 87 Jerry Smith; 42 Charley Taylor; Tight ends (TE): 81 Ken Barefoot; 86 Marlin McKeever; 88 Pat Richter	Offensive linemen (OL): 61 Don Bandy G/T; 68 Willie Banks G; 57 Dave Crossan C/G; 56 Len Hauss C; 65 Vince Promuto G; 76 Walt Rock T; 62 Ray Schoenke G/T; 74 Jim Snowden T; 75 Fred Washington T; 67 John Wooten G; Defensive linemen (DL): 77 Walt Barnes DE; 73 Frank Bosch DT; 79 Dennis Crane DT; 66 Carl Kammerer DE; 71 Spain Musgrove DE; 72 Joe Rutgens DT	Linebackers (LB): 63 Ed Breding MLB; 60 Jim Carroll MLB; 55 Chris Hanburger OLB; 52 Mike Morgan OLB; 54 Tom Roussel OLB; Defensive backs (DB): 37 Pat Fischer CB; 21 George Harold SS; 46 Rickie Harris CB; 40 Aaron Martin CB; 28 Dick Smith FS; 34 Jim Smith FS; 23 Brig Owens SS; Special teams (ST): 4 Mike Bragg P; 3 Charlie Gogolak K	Practice squad: 38 Ollie Dunlap LB; 5 Curt Knight K; 82 Dave Weedman DE; Reserve: 64 Mitch Johnson T (IR); -- Dick LeMay DE (Military); 27 John Love WR (Military); 14 Danny Talbott QB (Military); Rookies in italics

== Preseason ==
Week	Date	Opponent	Result	Record	Venue	Attendance
1	August 1	at Houston Oilers (AFL)	L 3–9	0–1	Astrodome	41,468
2	August 10	vs. Atlanta Falcons	W 16–14	1–1	Tampa Stadium (Tampa, FL)	42,180
3	August 16	Baltimore Colts	L 13–15	1–2	D.C. Stadium	45,810
4	August 24	vs. Chicago Bears	L 13–45	1–3	Carter–Finley Stadium (Raleigh, NC)	26,800
5	August 29	Detroit Lions	W 16–10	2–3	D.C. Stadium	36,721
6	September 7	vs. Pittsburgh Steelers	W 24–17	3–3	Foreman Field (Norfolk, VA)	17,712

== Regular season ==
=== Schedule ===
Week	Date	Opponent	Result	Record	Venue	Attendance	Recap
1	September 15	at Chicago Bears	**W** 38–28	1–0	Wrigley Field	41,321	Recap
2	September 22	at New Orleans Saints	**L** 17–37	1–1	Tulane Stadium	65,941	Recap
3	September 29	at **New York Giants**	**L** 21–48	1–2	Yankee Stadium	62,797	Recap
4	October 6	**Philadelphia Eagles**	**W** 17–14	2–2	D.C. Stadium	50,816	Recap
5	October 13	Pittsburgh Steelers	**W** 16–13	3–2	D.C. Stadium	50,659	Recap
6	October 20	at St. Louis Cardinals	**L** 14–41	3–3	Busch Memorial Stadium	46,456	Recap
7	October 27	**New York Giants**	**L** 10–13	3–4	D.C. Stadium	50,839	Recap
8	November 3	at Minnesota Vikings	**L** 14–27	3–5	Metropolitan Stadium	47,644	Recap
9	November 10	at **Philadelphia Eagles**	**W** 16–10	4–5	Franklin Field	59,133	Recap
10	November 17	**Dallas Cowboys**	**L** 24–44	4–6	D.C. Stadium	50,816	Recap
11	November 24	Green Bay Packers	**L** 7–27	4–7	D.C. Stadium	50,621	Recap
12	November 28	at **Dallas Cowboys**	**L** 20–29	4–8	Cotton Bowl	66,076	Recap
13	December 8	Cleveland Browns	**L** 21–24	4–9	D.C. Stadium	50,661	Recap
14	December 15	Detroit Lions	**W** 14–3	5–9	D.C. Stadium	50,123	Recap
Note: Intra-division opponents are in **bold** text.

== Season summary ==
=== Week 1 ===
Team	1	2	3	4	Total
• Redskins	14	14	7	3	38
Bears	7	14	0	7	28

- Date: September 15
- Location: Wrigley Field, Chicago
- Game attendance: 41,321
- Game weather: 71 °F (22 °C), wind 8 mph

Scoring summary
1	WSH	Pat Richter 16 yard pass from Sonny Jurgensen (Charlie Gogolak kick)	Redskins 7–0
1	WSH	Gerry Allen 12 yard run (Charlie Gogolak kick)	Redskins 14–0
1	CHI	Jack Concannon 7 yard run (Mac Percival kick)	Redskins 14–7
2	WSH	Gerry Allen 99 yard pass from Sonny Jurgensen (Charlie Gogolak kick)	Redskins 21–7
2	CHI	Brian Piccolo 12 yard run (Mac Percival kick)	Redskins 21–14
2	WSH	Pat Richter 6 yard pass from Sonny Jurgensen (Charlie Gogolak kick)	Redskins 28–14
2	CHI	Ronnie Bull 6 yard run (Mac Percival kick)	Redskins 28–21
3	WSH	Pat Richter 19 yard pass from Sonny Jurgensen (Charlie Gogolak kick)	Redskins 35–21
4	CHI	Ronnie Bull 8 yard run (Mac Percival kick)	Redskins 35–21
4	WSH	Charlie Gogolak 37 yard field goal	Redskins 38–21

=== Week 5 ===
Team	1	2	3	4	Total
Steelers	0	10	0	3	13
• Redskins	6	3	7	0	16

- Date: October 13
- Location: D.C. Stadium, Washington, D.C.
- Game weather: 62 °F (17 °C), wind 3 mph

Scoring summary
1	WSH	Jerry Smith 17 yard pass from Sonny Jurgensen (kick failed)	Redskins 6–0
2	WSH	Charlie Gogolak 24 yard field goal	Redskins 9–0
2	PIT	Booth Lusteg 24 yard field goal	Redskins 9–3
2	PIT	Roy Jefferson 33 yard pass from Dick Shiner (Booth Lusteg kick)	Steelers 10–9
3	WSH	Jerry Smith 49 yard pass from Sonny Jurgensen (Charlie Gogolak kick)	Redskins 16–10
4	PIT	Booth Lusteg 30 yard field goal	Redskins 16–13

== Standings ==
NFL Capitol
	W	L	T	PCT	DIV	CONF	PF	PA	STK
Dallas Cowboys	12	2	0	.857	5–1	9–1	431	186	W5
New York Giants	7	7	0	.500	5–1	7–3	294	325	L4
Washington Redskins	5	9	0	.357	2–4	3–7	249	358	W1
Philadelphia Eagles	2	12	0	.143	0–6	1–9	202	351	L1

Note: Tie games were not officially counted in the standings until 1972.
