= Bobby Lee (American football) =

American football player (1945–2009)

No. 47, 82
- Position: Wide receiver

Personal information
- Born: August 26, 1945; Montgomery, Alabama, U.S.
- Died: April 25, 2009 (aged 63)
- Listed height: 6 ft 4 in (1.93 m)
- Listed weight: 200 lb (91 kg)

Career information
- High school: Booker T. Washington (Montgomery)
- College: Minnesota
- NFL draft: 1968: 17th round, 447th overall pick

Career history
- St. Louis Cardinals (1968); Atlanta Falcons (1969)
- Stats at Pro Football Reference

Bobby Dale Lee (August 26, 1945 – April 25, 2009) is an American former professional football player who was a wide receiver for the St. Louis Cardinals and Atlanta Falcons of the National Football League (NFL). He played college football for the Minnesota Golden Gophers.
