= 1968 Dallas Cowboys season =

NFL team season

- Owner: Clint Murchison, Jr.
- General manager: Tex Schramm
- Head coach: Tom Landry
- Home stadium: Cotton Bowl

Results
- Record: 12–2
- Division place: 1st NFL Capitol
- Playoffs: Lost Eastern Conference Championship Game (at Browns) 20–31; Won NFL Playoff Bowl (vs. Vikings) 17–13

The 1968 Dallas Cowboys season was their ninth in the National Football League (NFL) and won the Capitol division by five games with a 12–2 record (tied with 1977 for the best record in the Landry era). In the first round of the playoffs, Dallas met the Cleveland Browns (10–4) in the Eastern Conference title game, held at Municipal Stadium in Cleveland. In this era, the host sites were rotated, home field advantage was not adopted for the playoffs until 1975. Dallas had won the regular season game 28–7 in September, and had routed the Browns 52–14 in the previous year's playoffs, but both were played at the Cotton Bowl.

The Browns upset the favored Cowboys 31–20, sending Dallas to the third place Playoff Bowl at the Orange Bowl in Miami, where they rallied to defeat the Minnesota Vikings, 17–13.

The team averaged 30.8 points per game during the regular season, and holds the record for most points scored through the first three games of a season.

== Offseason ==
=== NFL draft ===
1968 Dallas Cowboys draft
Round	Pick	Player	Position	College	Notes
1	20	Dennis Homan	Wide receiver	Alabama	
2	45	Dave McDaniels	Wide receiver	Mississippi Valley State	
3	71	Ed Harmon	Linebacker	Louisville	
4	97	John Douglas	Linebacker	Missouri	
5	130	Blaine Nye *	Guard	Stanford	
6	159	D. D. Lewis	Linebacker	Mississippi State	
7	185	Bob Taucher	Tackle	Nebraska	
8	211	Frank Brown	Defensive tackle	Albany State	
9	241	Ken Kmiec	Defensive back	Illinois	
10	266	Ben Olison	Wide receiver	Kansas	
11	292	Ron Shotts	Running back	Oklahoma	
12	321	Wilson Whitty	Linebacker	Boston University	
13	347	Carter Lord	Wide receiver	Harvard	
14	373	Ron Williams	Defensive back	West Virginia	
15	402	Tony Lunceford	Kicker	Auburn	
16	428	Larry Cole	Defensive end	Hawaii	yes
17	454	George Nordgren	Running back	Houston	
Made roster * Made at least one Pro Bowl during career

=== Undrafted free agents ===
1968 undrafted free agents of note
Player	Position	College
Paul Catino	Defensive tackle	Southern Connecticut
Bill Creeden	Quarterback	Penn
Roger Grimes	Running back	Penn State
Hugo Hollas	Safety	Rice
Sal Olivas	Quarterback	New Mexico State

== Roster ==
Dallas Cowboys 1968 roster
Quarterbacks: 17 Don Meredith; 14 Craig Morton; Running backs: 46 Craig Baynham; 32 Walt Garrison; 43 Don Perkins; 25 Les Shy; Wide receivers: 35 Pete Gent; 22 Bob Hayes; 24 Dennis Homan; 88 Sonny Randle; 19 Lance Rentzel; Tight ends: 84 Pettis Norman; 85 Rayfield Wright	Offensive linemen: 72 Tony Liscio T; 51 Dave Manders C; 73 Ralph Neely T; 76 John Niland G; 61 Blaine Nye G; 57 Malcolm Walker C; 65 John Wilbur G; Defensive linemen: 66 George Andrie DE; 63 Larry Cole DE; 77 Ron East DT; 74 Bob Lilly DT; 75 Jethro Pugh DT; 87 Andy Stynchula DE	Linebackers: 52 Dave Edwards OLB; 54 Chuck Howley OLB; 55 Lee Roy Jordan MLB; 50 D. D. Lewis OLB; 53 Dave Simmons MLB; Defensive backs: 37 Phil Clark CB/S; 21 Dick Daniels FS; 27 Mike Gaechter SS; 34 Cornell Green CB; 23 Mike Johnson CB; 20 Mel Renfro CB/FS; Special teams: 83 Mike Clark K; 12 Ron Widby P	Reserve lists: 60 Jackie Burkett OLB (IR); 26 Buddy Dial WR (IR); 62 Leon Donohue G (IR); -- John Douglas LB (Military); 30 Dan Reeves RB (IR); -- Roger Staubach QB (Military); 71 Willie Townes DE (IR); Taxi squad: -- Ed Harmon LB; -- Ken Kmiec S; -- Obert Logan CB; 80 Dave McDaniels WR; -- George Nordgren RB; 13 Jerry Rhome QB; -- Earnest Sterling DE; Rookies in italics 39 active, 6 inactive, 7 Taxi squad

== Schedule ==
Week	Date	Opponent	Result	Record	Game Site	Attendance	Recap
1	September 15	Detroit Lions	**W** 59–13	1–0	Cotton Bowl	61,382	Recap
2	September 22	Cleveland Browns	**W** 28–7	2–0	Cotton Bowl	68,733	Recap
3	September 29	at **Philadelphia Eagles**	**W** 45–13	3–0	Franklin Field	60,858	Recap
4	October 6	at St. Louis Cardinals	**W** 27–10	4–0	Busch Memorial Stadium	48,296	Recap
5	October 13	**Philadelphia Eagles**	**W** 34–14	5–0	Cotton Bowl	72,083	Recap
6	October 20	at Minnesota Vikings	**W** 20–7	6–0	Metropolitan Stadium	47,644	Recap
7	October 28	Green Bay Packers	**L** 17–28	6–1	Cotton Bowl	74,604	Recap
8	November 3	at New Orleans Saints	**W** 17–3	7–1	Tulane Stadium	84,728	Recap
9	November 10	**New York Giants**	**L** 21–27	7–2	Cotton Bowl	72,163	Recap
10	November 17	at **Washington Redskins**	**W** 44–24	8–2	D.C. Stadium	50,816	Recap
11	November 24	at Chicago Bears	**W** 34–3	9–2	Wrigley Field	46,667	Recap
12	November 28	**Washington Redskins**	**W** 29–20	10–2	Cotton Bowl	66,076	Recap
13	December 8	Pittsburgh Steelers	**W** 28–7	11–2	Cotton Bowl	55,069	Recap
14	December 15	at **New York Giants**	**W** 28–10	12–2	Yankee Stadium	62,617	Recap
Note: Intra-division opponents are in **bold** text.

== Game summaries ==
=== Week 3 ===
Team	1	2	3	4	Total
• Cowboys	7	7	14	17	45
Eagles	3	10	0	0	13

- Date: September 29
- Location: Franklin Field, Philadelphia, Pennsylvania
- Game attendance: 60,858
- Game weather: 61 °F (16 °C); wind 12 mph

Scoring summary
Q1	PHI	Sam Baker 23 yard field goal	PHI 3–0
Q1	DAL	Dan Reeves 2 yard pass from Don Meredith (Mike Clark kick)	DAL 7–3
Q2	DAL	Lance Rentzel 11 yard pass from Don Meredith (Mike Clark kick)	DAL 14–3
Q2	PHI	Gary Ballman 18 yard pass from King Hill (Sam Baker kick)	DAL 14–10
Q2	PHI	Sam Baker 13 yard field goal	DAL 14–13
Q3	DAL	Bob Hayes 44 yard pass from Don Meredith (Mike Clark kick)	DAL 21–13
Q3	DAL	Don Perkins 10 yard pass from Don Meredith (Mike Clark kick)	DAL 28–13
Q4	DAL	Mike Clark 26 yard field goal	DAL 31–13
Q4	DAL	Lance Rentzel 8 yard pass from Don Meredith (Mike Clark kick)	DAL 38–13
Q4	DAL	Craig Morton 4 yard run (Mike Clark kick)	DAL 45–13

=== Week 14 ===
Team	1	2	3	4	Total
• Cowboys	0	7	14	7	28
Giants	3	0	0	7	10

- Date: December 15
- Location: Yankee Stadium, The Bronx, New York
- Game weather: 30 °F (−1 °C), wind 20 mph

Scoring summary
1	NYG	Pete Gogolak 12 yard field goal	Giants 3–0
2	DAL	Bob Hayes 13 yard pass from Craig Morton (Mike Clark kick)	Cowboys 7–3
3	DAL	Bob Hayes 63 yard punt return (Mike Clark kick)	Cowboys 14–3
3	DAL	Craig Morton 1 yard run (Mike Clark kick)	Cowboys 21–3
4	DAL	Walt Garrison 8 yard run (Mike Clark kick)	Cowboys 28–3
4	NYG	Aaron Thomas 46 yard pass from Fran Tarkenton (Pete Gogolak kick)	Cowboys 28–10

== Playoffs ==
Round	Date	Opponent	Result	Game Site	Attendance	Recap
Eastern Conference	December 21, 1968	at Cleveland Browns	L 20–31	Cleveland Stadium	81,497	Recap
Playoff Bowl	January 5, 1969	vs Minnesota Vikings	W 17–13	Orange Bowl	22,961	

== Standings ==
NFL Capitol
	W	L	T	PCT	DIV	CONF	PF	PA	STK
Dallas Cowboys	12	2	0	.857	5–1	9–1	431	186	W5
New York Giants	7	7	0	.500	5–1	7–3	294	325	L4
Washington Redskins	5	9	0	.357	2–4	3–7	249	358	W1
Philadelphia Eagles	2	12	0	.143	0–6	1–9	202	351	L1

Note: Tie games were not officially counted in the standings until 1972.
