= John Douglas (linebacker) =

American football player (born 1945)

No. 51
- Position: Linebacker

Personal information
- Born: September 6, 1945 (age 81); Columbia, Missouri, U.S.
- Listed height: 6 ft 2 in (1.88 m)
- Listed weight: 228 lb (103 kg)

Career information
- High school: Columbia
- College: Missouri
- NFL draft: 1968: 4th round, 97th overall pick

Career history
- Dallas Cowboys (1968, 1970)*; New York Giants (1970–1973); The Hawaiians (1974)
- * Offseason or practice squad member only

Awards and highlights
- First-team All-Big Eight (1967)

Career NFL statistics
- Games played: 56
- Stats at Pro Football Reference

John Louis Douglas (born September 6, 1945) is an American former professional football player who was a linebacker for the New York Giants of the National Football League (NFL). He played college football for the Missouri Tigers. He also played for The Hawaiians of the World Football League (WFL).

== Early life ==
Douglas attended Columbia High School in Columbia, Missouri. He accepted a football scholarship from the University of Missouri, where he played only two seasons of college football because he left to work after his freshman year.

As a senior linebacker, he was a team co-captain along with quarterback Gary Kombrink and received All-Big Eight honors.

== Professional career ==
Douglas was selected by the Dallas Cowboys in the fourth round (97th overall) of the 1968 NFL/AFL draft. His rookie season was interrupted when he was called up by the Army Reserve. After serving two years of military service in the Vietnam War (where he was wounded), he returned for training camp in 1970 and was waived on September 14.

He was claimed off waivers by the New York Giants and played mostly on special teams. In 1971, he was named the starter at strong-side linebacker. The next year, he returned to a reserve role. In 1973, he started 10 games.

In 1974, he signed with the Hawaiians of the World Football League.
