= Jim Holifield =

American football player and coach (born 1946)

Biographical details
- Born: January 18, 1946; Bessemer, Alabama, U.S.

Playing career
- 1964–1967: Jackson State
- 1968–1969: New York Giants
- Position: Defensive back

Coaching career (HC unless noted)
- 1972–1974: Miles

James Lee Holifield (born January 18, 1946) is an American former football player and coach. He played professionally as a defensive back for the New York Giants of the National Football League (NFL) from 1968 to 1969.

Holifield played college football for the Jackson State Tigers and was selected by the Giants in the 1968 NFL/AFL draft. After his playing career, he served as the head coach at Miles College in Fairfield, Alabama, from 1972 to 1974.
