= Dennis Crane =

American football player (1945–2003)

No. 79, 74
- Positions: Defensive tackle, Offensive tackle

Personal information
- Born: February 23, 1945; San Bernardino, California, U.S.
- Died: November 30, 2003 (aged 58); Scranton, Arkansas, U.S.
- Listed height: 6 ft 7 in (2.01 m)
- Listed weight: 260 lb (118 kg)

Career information
- High school: Colton (Colton, California)
- College: USC (1966-1967)
- NFL draft: 1968: 4th round, 94th overall pick

Career history
- Washington Redskins (1968–1969); New York Giants (1970); Southern California Sun (1974)

Awards and highlights
- National champion (1967)

Career NFL statistics
- Fumble recoveries: 2
- Sacks: 2.5
- Stats at Pro Football Reference

Dennis Walter Crane (February 23, 1945 – November 30, 2003) was an American football defensive tackle in the National Football League (NFL) for the Washington Redskins and the New York Giants. He played college football at the University of Southern California and was drafted in the fourth round of the 1968 NFL/AFL draft.
