= Mark Nordquist =

American football player (born 1945)

No. 68, 63
- Positions: Guard, Center

Personal information
- Born: November 3, 1945 (age 81); Long Beach, California, U.S.
- Listed height: 6 ft 4 in (1.93 m)
- Listed weight: 246 lb (112 kg)

Career information
- High school: Reseda (Los Angeles, California)
- College: Pacific (1966-1967)
- NFL draft: 1968: 5th round, 124th overall pick

Career history
- Philadelphia Eagles (1968–1974); Chicago Bears (1975–1976)

Career NFL statistics
- Games played: 111
- Games started: 79
- Fumble recoveries: 4
- Stats at Pro Football Reference

Mark Allan Nordquist (born November 3, 1945) is an American former professional football player who was an offensive lineman for nine seasons in the National Football League (NFL) for the Philadelphia Eagles and the Chicago Bears. He played college football for the Pacific Tigers.

Mark Nordquist founded the company DonJoy (now ENOVIS) in 1978 in a Carlsbad, California garage. Mark Nordquist was a former Philadelphia Eagles' offensive line captain, he founded the company with a local lawyer, Ken Reed. Together, they named their new company after their wives, Donna and Joy.
