= Dave Martin (linebacker) =

American football player (born 1946)

No. 58, 53
- Position: linebacker

Personal information
- Born: October 23, 1946 (age 80); Kansas City, Kansas, U.S.
- Listed height: 6 ft 0 in (1.83 m)
- Listed weight: 225 lb (102 kg)

Career information
- High school: Bishop Miege (Roeland Park, Kansas)
- College: Notre Dame (1964-1967)
- NFL draft: 1968: 6th round, 157th overall pick

Career history
- Philadelphia Eagles (1968)*; Kansas City Chiefs (1968); Chicago Bears (1969)
- * Offseason or practice squad member only

Awards and highlights
- National champion (1966)

Career NFL/AFL statistics
- Sacks: 1
- Stats at Pro Football Reference

David Kenneth Martin (born October 23, 1946) is an American former professional football player who was a linebacker in the American Football League (AFL) and National Football League (NFL). He played college football for the Notre Dame Fighting Irish before playing in the AFL for the Kansas City Chiefs in 1968 and in the NFL with the Chicago Bears in 1969.
