= Richie Davis (Canadian football) =

American gridiron football player (born 1945)

Profile
- Positions: Defensive back, Wide receiver

Personal information
- Born: December 24, 1945 (age 80); Plainfield, New Jersey, U.S.
- Listed height: 5 ft 11 in (1.80 m)
- Listed weight: 190 lb (86 kg)

Career information
- College: Upsala
- NFL draft: 1968: 14th round, 364th overall pick

Career history
- 1970: Montreal Alouettes

Awards and highlights
- Grey Cup champion - 1970

Richard Curtis Davis (born December 24, 1945) is an American former defensive back who played for the Montreal Alouettes of the Canadian Football League (CFL) in 1970. He was part of their Grey Cup championship team.

Davis was selected in the 14th round of the 1968 NFL draft by the Detroit Lions but was cut and came to Canada. Playing 11 games with Montreal in 1970 he had six interceptions and was key part of the team's playoff drive. He broke his jaw in the final game of the season and was replaced by Bobby Lee Thompson for the playoffs.
