= Gayle Knief =

American football player (born 1946)

No. 84
- Position: Wide receiver

Personal information
- Born: December 28, 1946 (age 79); Denison, Iowa, U.S.
- Listed height: 6 ft 3 in (1.91 m)
- Listed weight: 205 lb (93 kg)

Career information
- High school: Schleswig (Schleswig, Iowa)
- College: Morningside (1964-1967)
- NFL draft: 1968: undrafted

Career history
- Minnesota Vikings (1968–1969)*; Boston Patriots (1970); Minnesota Vikings (1972)*
- * Offseason or practice squad member only

Career NFL statistics
- Receptions: 3
- Receiving yards: 39
- Touchdowns: 1
- Stats at Pro Football Reference

Gayle C. Knief (born December 28, 1946) is an American former professional football player who was a wide receiver in the National Football League (NFL). He played college football for the Morningside Mustangs.

Knief was born in Denison, Iowa, in 1946. He attended Schleswig High School in Schleswig, Iowa, and played college football and basketball at Morningside College in Sioux City, Iowa. He received All-North Central Conference honors in football in 1966 and 1967.

He signed with the Minnesota Vikings as an undrafted free agent in 1968. He played on the Vikings' taxi squad during the 1968 and 1969 seasons. He signed with the Boston Patriots in 1970. He appeared in three games during the 1970 season. He entered his first NFL game with two minutes and 18 seconds remaining and caught two passes, including a 22-yard touchdown reception. He was cut by the Patriots in 1971 and returned to the Vikings' taxi squad that fall.

Knief married Diane McClintock, and they had two son, Jason and Derek. After retiring from football, he owned and operated a construction and real estate firm in Carroll, Iowa. In 1997, he was inducted into the Morningside College M-Club Hall of Fame.
