= Ed Harmon =

American football player (born 1946)

No. 57
- Position: Linebacker

Personal information
- Born: December 16, 1946 (age 79); North Tonawanda, New York, U.S.
- Listed height: 6 ft 4 in (1.93 m)
- Listed weight: 235 lb (107 kg)

Career information
- High school: Bishop Gibbons {{|(North Tonawanda, New York)}}
- College: Louisville
- NFL draft: 1968: 3rd round, 71st overall pick

Career history
- Dallas Cowboys (1968)*; Cincinnati Bengals (1969)
- * Offseason or practice squad member only

Awards and highlights
- 2× All-MVC (1966, 1967)

Career NFL statistics
- Games played: 11
- Stats at Pro Football Reference

Edward Charles Harmon (born December 16, 1946) is an American former professional football player who was a linebacker for the Cincinnati Bengals of the American Football League (AFL). He played college football for the Louisville Cardinals, and was selected in the third round of the 1968 NFL draft by the Dallas Cowboys.

== Early life ==
Harmon was born in North Tonawanda, a suburb of Buffalo, in Western New York. There he attended Bishop Gibbons High School. He moved on to play for the University of Louisville, where he was a backup fullback behind Wayne Patrick.

After being deemed "too valuable" to be a second stringer, he was moved to linebacker as a junior, making a name for himself as a hard hitter with great intensity. In 1966, he set a single-game school record with 16 tackles while playing against the University of Tulsa.

He was inducted into the University of Louisville Athletics Hall of Fame.

== Professional career ==
=== Dallas Cowboys ===
Harmon was selected by the Dallas Cowboys in the third round (71st overall) of the 1968 NFL/AFL draft, because they were impressed that his athleticism allowed him to play linebacker at a bigger size than most players could in that era.

The Cowboys were deep at linebacker and he couldn't make the team, so he spent his rookie season on the taxi squad. In 1969, he was tried at defensive end and offensive tackle, before being released on September 9. Instead of joining the taxi squad again, he decided to sign with a different team.

=== Cincinnati Bengals ===
In 1969, he signed as a free agent with the Cincinnati Bengals. He played in 11 contests and was voted the player of the game against the New York Jets. He was waived injured on August 25, 1970.

== Personal life ==
Ed worked for General Electric for 31 years in multiple positions and locations before retirement in New Mexico..

Ed played rugby in Chicago and Louisville for 7 years.

Ed was married to Jean Harmon for 42 years prior to her death in 2024..
