= John Mallory (American football) =

American football player (born 1946)

No. 47, 22
- Position: Defensive back

Personal information
- Born: July 24, 1946 (age 80); Summit, New Jersey, U.S.
- Listed height: 6 ft 1 in (1.85 m)
- Listed weight: 184 lb (83 kg)

Career information
- High school: Summit
- College: West Virginia
- NFL draft: 1968: 10th round, 258th overall pick

Career history
- Philadelphia Eagles (1968); Atlanta Falcons (1969–1971)

Career NFL statistics
- Interceptions: 2
- Fumble recoveries: 8
- Touchdowns: 4
- Stats at Pro Football Reference

John Mallory (born July 24, 1946) is an American former professional football player who was a defensive back for the Philadelphia Eagles and Atlanta Falcons of the National Football League (NFL). He played college football for the West Virginia Mountaineers.
