= Kenny Parker =

American football player (born 1946)

No. 21, 26
- Position: Defensive back

Personal information
- Born: July 22, 1946 (age 80); Paterson, New Jersey, U.S.
- Listed height: 6 ft 1 in (1.85 m)
- Listed weight: 190 lb (86 kg)

Career information
- High school: Eastside (Paterson)
- College: Fordham (basketball)
- NFL draft: 1968: 16th round, 422nd overall pick

Career history
- Long Island Bulls (1969); New York Giants (1968–1971)
- Stats at Pro Football Reference

Kenny Parker (born July 22, 1946) is an American former professional football defensive back who played in the National Football League (NFL).

== Early life ==
Parker was born and grew up in Paterson, New Jersey and attended Eastside High School. He played basketball and football and was named first-team All-Passaic Valley Conference at quarterback as a senior.

== College basketball career ==
Parker played basketball at Fordham, which did not have a college football team at the time. Parker played under head coach Johnny Bach and was a starter at guard. He named the Rams captain as a senior and was an Academic All-America selection. Parker averaged 4.9 points over 77 games during his collegiate basketball career.

== Professional career ==
Despite not having played football since high school, Parker was selected in the 16th round of the 1968 NFL/AFL draft by the New York Giants. He suffered a season-ending injury during the 1968 preseason and spent 1969 on the practice squad. Parker made the Giants active roster in 1970, and eventually became a starter at cornerback due to injuries. Parker was cut at the end of training camp in 1971.
