= Joe Kuharich =

American football player and coach (1917–1981)

No. 88, 17
- Position: Guard

Personal information
- Born: April 14, 1917; South Bend, Indiana, U.S.
- Died: January 25, 1981 (aged 63); Philadelphia, Pennsylvania, U.S.
- Listed height: 5 ft 11 in (1.80 m)
- Listed weight: 195 lb (88 kg)

Career information
- High school: James Whitcomb Riley (South Bend)
- College: Notre Dame (1935–1937)
- NFL draft: 1938: 12th round, 104th overall pick

Career history

Playing
- Chicago Cardinals (1940–1941, 1945)

Coaching
- Pittsburgh Steelers (1946) Line coach; San Francisco (1947) Line coach; San Francisco (1948–1951) Head coach; Chicago Cardinals (1952) Head coach; Washington Redskins (1954–1958) Head coach; Notre Dame (1959–1962) Head coach; Philadelphia Eagles (1964–1968) Head coach

Operations
- Philadelphia Eagles (1965-1968) General manager

Awards and highlights
- Playing: First-team All-Pro (1941); Pro Bowl (1941); Coaching: SN NFL Coach of the Year (1955); UPI NFL Coach of the Year (1955)

Career NFL statistics
- Games played: 27
- Games started: 21
- Interceptions: 3
- Stats at Pro Football Reference

Head coaching record
- Career: NCAA: 42–37 (.532); NFL: 58–81–3 (.419)
- Coaching profile at Pro Football Reference
- Executive profile at Pro Football Reference

Joseph Lawrence Kuharich (April 14, 1917 – January 25, 1981) was an American professional football player and coach. He served as the head football coach at the University of San Francisco from 1948 to 1951, and at Notre Dame from 1959 to 1962, compiling a career college football record of 42–37. Kuharich was also the head coach of the Chicago Cardinals in 1952, the Washington Redskins from 1954 to 1958, and the Philadelphia Eagles from 1964 to 1968, achieving a career coaching record of 58–81–3 in the National Football League (NFL).

Kuharich played football as a guard at Notre Dame from 1935 to 1937 and with the Chicago Cardinals in 1940, 1941, and 1945. Kuharich died on the day the Eagles lost their first Super Bowl appearance in Super Bowl XV to the Oakland Raiders.

== Early life and education ==
Kuharich was born April 14, 1917, in South Bend, Indiana. He played college football at Notre Dame under coach Elmer Layden, who praised Kuharich as one of the best and smartest players he ever had. In his college career. Kuharich is noted for his participation in Notre Dame's comeback over Ohio State in 1935.

== Career ==
=== National Football League ===
Kuharich was drafted 104th overall by the Pittsburgh Pirates (NFL) in the 12th round of the 1938 NFL draft.

Kuharich began his coaching career as an assistant freshman coach at Notre Dame in 1938. In 1939, he coached at the Vincentian Institute in Albany, New York. He then moved to the professional ranks as a player, playing guard for the Chicago Cardinals in 1940 and 1941. After serving in the U.S. Navy, he returned to the Cardinals in 1945, his last season as a player.

=== Coaching career ===
==== Pittsburgh Steelers, University of San Francisco, and Washington Redskins ====
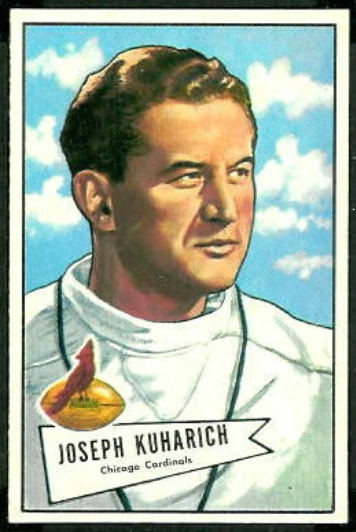
Bowman card for Joe Kuharich in 1952 of the Chicago Cardinals

In 1946, Kuharich served as line coach for the Pittsburgh Steelers and moved on to the University of San Francisco as head coach in 1948. His overall record for the University of San Francisco was 25–14, including an undefeated 9–0 season in 1951. Among his most notable pupils was Ollie Matson, who became a star running back with the Chicago Cardinals and a member of the Pro Football Hall of Fame. Other USF teammates under Kuharich included future Hall of Famers Gino Marchetti and Bob St. Clair to go along with Burl Toler, a defensive standout who later became the NFL's first African-American official. The team's student publicity director, Pete Rozelle, served as National Football League Commissioner. The team is among the most decorated in the Pro Football Hall of Fame. The team did not play in a bowl game due to bowl officials wanting to exclude black players from participating in the games; when the Orange Bowl tried to invite the squad to play without their black players, they unanimously declined and subsequently called themselves the "undefeated, untied, and uninvited". Financial concerns led the school to disband football the following year. In 1970, Kuharich was inducted into the USF Athletics Hall of Fame.

Following that season, he moved to the National Football League, serving as head coach of the Chicago Cardinals in 1952, succeeding Curly Lambeau. In 1953, he served as a scout for several pro teams, then in 1954 became coach of the Washington Redskins, then owned by the controversial George Preston Marshall, once again, following Lambeau. The Redskins' claim to fame was Eddie LeBaron, the smallest quarterback in the league, A successful campaign in 1955 landed Kuharich "Coach of the Year" honors, followed by a losing streak. After five seasons in Washington, Kuharich resigned when he received an offer from Notre Dame.

==== Notre Dame ====
Kuharich became head coach of Notre Dame in 1959. He had earlier been contacted with offers by Notre Dame after the 1956 season after the Irish finished 2–8, but before he had a chance to accept an offer, Terry Brennan was retained in his position. Kuharich compiled a 17–23 record over four non-winning seasons, becoming the only coach to have an overall losing record at Notre Dame.

Kuharich resigned in the spring of 1963 and assumed the post of the first supervisor of NFL officials. Following Kuharich's departure, Hugh Devore was named interim head coach while the search for a permanent replacement was sought. Despite his unsuccessful Notre Dame tenure, Kuharich remains the only Notre Dame head coach to post back-to-back shutouts over USC, Notre Dame's major rival, in both 1960 (17–0) and 1961 (30–0).

Kuharich is commonly associated with a rule change still in effect today, known by some as the Kuharich defensive foul rule. In 1961, Notre Dame trailed Syracuse at home 14–15, with three seconds left to play. A 56-yard field goal attempt by the Notre Dame fell short as time ran out, effectively ending the game. However, Syracuse was penalized 15 yards for roughing the place kick holder, and Notre Dame was given a second chance despite the clock running out. Kicker Joe Perkowski attempted a 41-yard field goal successfully, and Notre Dame won the game 17–15. Syracuse immediately cried foul, claiming that under the existing rules, the second kick should not have been allowed because time had expired. It was never clear whether the Irish victory was permitted to stand, but a rule was clarified to state that half cannot end on an accepted defensive foul, a decision consistent with the officials' ruling.

==== Philadelphia Eagles ====
Kuharich returned to the NFL in 1964 as head coach and general manager of the Philadelphia Eagles after the team struggled to a 2–10–2 record in 1963, largely due to injuries to quarterback Sonny Jurgensen. Seeking to reshape the roster, he made a pair of transactions within the last twelve days of March 1964. The first sent Tommy McDonald to the Dallas Cowboys for Lynn Hoyem, John Meyers and Sam Baker on 20 March. The other had Sonny Jurgensen and Jimmy Carr traded to the Washington Redskins for Norm Snead and Claude Crabb eleven days later on 31 March. The latter deal was part of a youth movement, as both Snead and Crabb were age 24 at the time while Jurgensen and Carr were 29 and 31 respectively. In that year's draft, Kuharich selected Nebraska offensive tackle Bob Brown, who would later be inducted into the Hall of Fame in 2004, and the team also acquired future Hall of Famer Ollie Matson from the Detroit Lions. Despite these significant additions, the Eagles continued to struggle, finishing 6–8 in 1964 and 5–9 in 1965.

Kuharich's only winning season with the Eagles came in 1966, when the team went 9–5. Immediately following this season, Eagles' then-owner Jerry Wolman gave Kuharich an unprecedented contract extension of 15 years. The contract was seen by the fans and the Philadelphia media as unnecessary. The winning 1966 season, in which the Eagles finished 2nd in the Eastern Conference, gave the team a date with the Baltimore Colts in the Playoff Bowl, a postseason exhibition intended to draw fans and help coaches plan for the following season, in which Kuharich became the first coach to wear a wireless microphone for NFL Films. Portions of his wiring and the Playoff Bowl itself, were used at the end of NFL Films' 1967 special They Call It Pro Football, as well as NFL Films “Portrait of a Coach”.

Following a 6–7–1 season in 1967, the Eagles declined further in what became Joe Kuharich's final year as head coach in 1968. The team spent much of the season vying for the league's worst record, which would have secured the No. 1 overall pick and the chance to draft Heisman Trophy winner O. J. Simpson. However, late-season victories in the 14-game schedule left Philadelphia with a 2–12–0 record, allowing the Buffalo Bills (1–12–1) to earn the top selection instead. Kuharich's unpopularity peaked that season, with a plane towing a "Joe Must Go" banner circling Franklin Field during multiple home games.

Three months following the 1969 NFL draft, on May 1, 1969, financially distressed owner Jerry Wolman sold the Eagles to trucking millionaire Leonard Tose. Tose and Kuharich agreed to a settlement on the remaining years of the ex-coach's $60,000 annual contract.

Kuharich's final record with the Eagles was 28–41–1, giving him a .407 winning percentage.

== Personal life ==
Kuharich married Madelyn Eleanor Imholz on October 6, 1943. They had two sons, Lary a former CFL and AFL head coach, and Bill, who followed in his father's footsteps as general manager of the New Orleans Saints from 1996 to 2000, director of pro personnel from 2000 to 2005, and vice president of player personnel for the Kansas City Chiefs from 2006 to 2009.

In 1970, he was diagnosed with the bone cancer multiple myeloma. Although expected to die within two years, he was in remission by 1975 after chemotherapy, but relapsed in 1977 and died on January 25, 1981, the day that the Philadelphia Eagles played in their first Super Bowl.

== Head coaching record ==
=== College ===
Year	Team	Overall	Coaches^{#}	AP^{°}
San Francisco Dons (Independent) (1948–1951)
1948	San Francisco	2–7		
1949	San Francisco	7–3		
1950	San Francisco	7–4		
1951	San Francisco	9–0	14	14
San Francisco:		25–14		
Notre Dame Fighting Irish (NCAA University Division independent) (1959–1962)
1959	Notre Dame	5–5	18	17
1960	Notre Dame	2–8		
1961	Notre Dame	5–5		
1962	Notre Dame	5–5		
Notre Dame:		17–23		
Total:		42–37		
^{#}Rankings from final Coaches Poll.; ^{°}Rankings from final AP Poll.

=== NFL ===
Team	Year	Regular season					Postseason			
Team	Year	Won	Lost	Ties	Win %	Finish	Won	Lost	Win %	Result
CHI	1952	4	8	0	.333	6th in American Division	–	–	–	–
CHI total		4	8	0	.333		–	–	–	
WAS	1954	3	9	0	.250	5th in East Division	–	–	–	–
WAS	1955	8	4	0	.667	2nd in East Division	–	–	–	–
WAS	1956	6	6	0	.500	3rd in East Division	–	–	–	–
WAS	1957	5	6	1	.458	4th in East Division	–	–	–	–
WAS	1958	4	7	1	.375	4th in East Division	–	–	–	–
WAS total		26	32	2	.450		–	–	–	
PHI	1964	6	8	0	.429	3rd in East Division	–	–	–	–
PHI	1965	5	9	0	.357	5th in East Division	–	–	–	–
PHI	1966	9	5	0	.643	2nd in East Division	–	–	–	–
PHI	1967	6	7	1	.464	2nd in Capitol Division	–	–	–	–
PHI	1968	2	12	0	.143	4th in Capitol Division	–	–	–	–
PHI total		28	41	1	.407		–	–	–	
Total		58	81	3	.419		–	–	–	
