= 1967 Michigan Wolverines football team =

American college football season

1967 Michigan Wolverines football
- Conference: Big Ten Conference
- Record: 4–6 (3–4 Big Ten)
- Head coach: Bump Elliott (9th season)
- MVP: Ron Johnson
- Captain: Joe Dayton
- Home stadium: Michigan Stadium

1967 Big Ten Conference football standings
	Conf.					Overall
Team	W		L		T	W		L		T
No. 4 Indiana +	6	–	1	–	0	9	–	2	–	0
Minnesota +	6	–	1	–	0	8	–	2	–	0
No. 9 Purdue +	6	–	1	–	0	8	–	2	–	0
Ohio State	5	–	2	–	0	6	–	3	–	0
Illinois	3	–	4	–	0	4	–	6	–	0
Michigan	3	–	4	–	0	4	–	6	–	0
Michigan State	3	–	4	–	0	3	–	7	–	0
Northwestern	2	–	5	–	0	3	–	7	–	0
Iowa	0	–	6	–	1	1	–	8	–	1
Wisconsin	0	–	6	–	1	0	–	9	–	1
+ – Conference co-champions; Rankings from AP Poll

The 1967 Michigan Wolverines football team was an American football team that represented the University of Michigan in the 1967 Big Ten Conference football season. In its ninth year under head coach Bump Elliott, Michigan compiled a 4–6 record (3–4 against conference opponents), tied for fifth place in the Big Ten, and were outscored by a total of 179 to 144.

After opening the season with a victory over Duke, the team lost its next five games, including a 34–0 to rival Michigan State. After Dennis Brown took over from Dick Vidmer as the starting quarterback, the Wolverines won three consecutive games, coming from behind in each game. The team concluded its season with a 24–14 loss to Woody Hayes' Ohio State Buckeyes.

Right halfback Ron Johnson broke Michigan's single-game and season rushing records (270 yards vs. Navy, 1,005 yards for the season) and received the team's most valuable player award. Michigan's other statistical leaders included Dennis Brown with 928 passing yards and end Jim Berline with 624 receiving yards. Three Michigan players received first-team honors on the 1967 All-Big Ten Conference football team: Ron Johnson, center Joe Dayton, and linebacker Tom Stincic.

== Schedule ==
Date	Opponent	Site	TV	Result	Attendance	Source
September 23	Duke*	Michigan Stadium; Ann Arbor, MI		W 10–7	79,492	
September 30	at California*	California Memorial Stadium; Berkeley, CA	ABC	L 9–10	41,034	
October 7	Navy*	Michigan Stadium; Ann Arbor, MI		L 21–26	72,361	
October 14	Michigan State	Michigan Stadium; Ann Arbor, MI (rivalry)		L 0–34	103,210	
October 21	Indiana^{†}	Michigan Stadium; Ann Arbor, MI		L 20–27	65,759	
October 28	at Minnesota	Memorial Stadium; Minneapolis, MN (Little Brown Jug)		L 15–20	50,006	
November 4	Northwestern	Michigan Stadium; Ann Arbor, MI (rivalry)		W 7–3	62,063	
November 11	at Illinois	Memorial Stadium; Champaign, Il (rivalry)		W 21–14	44,236	
November 18	at Wisconsin	Camp Randall Stadium; Madison, WI		W 27–14	44,721	
November 25	Ohio State	Michigan Stadium; Ann Arbor, MI (rivalry)	ABC	L 14–24	64,144	
*Non-conference game; ^{†}Homecoming

== Season summary ==
=== Preseason ===
The 1966 Michigan Wolverines football team compiled a 6–4 record and outscored opponents by a combined total of 236 to 138. In all, 22 of the letter winners from the 1966, including 14 starters, team lost to graduation or professional football. The most valuable player on the 1966 team was All-American end Jack Clancy who set Big Ten records for receptions and receiving yardage. Clancy was claimed by the Miami Dolphins in the 1967 NFL/AFL draft. Other notable departures included: Jim Detwiler, the leading scorer in the Big Ten in 1966, who was taken in the first round of the draft; defensive back Rich Volk who was taken in the second round of the draft; linebacker Frank Nunley and defensive back John Rowser, both claimed in the third round; and running back Carl Ward, claimed in the fourth round.

Key players returning from the 1966 team included quarterback Dick Vidmer, center Joe Dayton, linebackers Rocky Rosema and Tom Stincic, defensive tackle Dave Porter, and defensive back George Hoey.

Michigan's 1967 recruiting class included Dan Dierdorf, Marty Huff, Don Moorhead, and Pete Newell.

Joe Dayton was selected as the team captain.

Look in its 1967 "College Football Forecast" picked Michigan to finish 19th in the country.

=== Duke ===
Week 1: Duke at Michigan

Team	1	2	3	4	Total
Duke	7	0	0	0	7
• Michigan	0	0	7	3	10

- Date: September 23
- Location: Ann Arbor, MI
- Game attendance: 79,492

Scoring summary
1		DUKE	Frank Ryan 6-yard run (Riesenfeld kick)	DUKE 7–0
3		MICH	Ernest Sharpe 7-yard run (Frank Titas kick)	TIE 7–7
4	0:11	MICH	Titas 20-yard field goal	MICH 10–7

On September 23, Michigan defeated Duke, 10-7, before a crowd of 79,492 at Michigan Stadium. Duke scored a touchdown in the first quarter and held a 7-0 lead at halftime. In the third quarter, Tom Stincic recovered a fumble near midfield, and Michigan drove downfield with Ernest Sharpe running for a touchdown to tie the score. With 44 seconds remaining in the game, Michigan took the ball at Duke's 49-yard line. Quarterback Dick Vidmer completed two passes to move the ball to the 10-yard line, and sophomore fullback Frank Titas kicked a game-winning 20-yard field goal with 11 seconds remaining. Titas had earlier missed a 30-yard attempt in the third quarter. Ron Johnson gained 82 yards on 19 carries, and Sharpe added 65 yards on 19 carries. Vidmer completed 13 of 27 passes for 174 yards and two interceptions.

=== California ===
Week 2: Michigan at California

Team	1	2	3	4	Total
Michigan	0	6	0	3	9
• California	3	0	0	7	10

- Date: September 30
- Location: Berkeley, CA
- Game attendance: 41,034
- TV announcers (ABC): Chris Schenkel, Bud Wilkinson

Scoring summary
1	7:51	CAL	Ron Miller 44-yard field goal	CAL 3–0
2	3:06	MICH	Ron Johnson 1-yard run (Brian Healy kick missed)	MICH 6–3
4	6:14	MICH	Mike Hankwitz 30-yard field goal	MICH 9–3
4	2:01	CAL	John McGaffie 77-yard pass from Randy Humphries (Ron Miller kick)	CAL 10–9

On September 30, Michigan lost to California, 10–9, before a crowd of 41,034 at California Memorial Stadium in Berkeley, California. It was Cal's first victory in five tries against Michigan and its first victory over a Big Ten team since 1952.

Cal took the lead with a 44-yard field goal midway through the first quarter. In the second quarter, Michigan took possession at Cal's 33-yard line after a 16-yard punt by Cal's Gary Fowler. Michigan advanced to the one-yard line on two runs by Warren Sipp, and Ron Johnson then scored from the one-yard line. Brian Healy's extra point kick was wide left, and Michigan led, 6-3.

In the fourth quarter, Michigan linebacker Bob Wedge recovered a fumble at Cal's 19-yard line, and Mike Hankwitz kicked a 30-yard field goal to extend the lead to 9-3 with 6:14 remaining in the game. Cal then scored on a 77-yard bomb from reserve quarterback Randy Humphries to fullback John McGaffie with two minutes remaining and kicked the extra point to take a 10-9 lead. On the next play from scrimmage, Michigan quarterback Dick Vidmer threw a 73-yard touchdown pass to Jim Berline, but the play was negated on a penalty for backfield in motion. With the crowd noise following Cal's touchdown, halfback Ernest Sharpe had difficulty hearing the signals and went in motion early. After the penalty, Vidmer was intercepted. At the end of the game, Cal players carried their head coach Ray Willsey off the field.

Cal out-gained Michigan by a total of 281 yards to 175. Michigan's kickers cost the team seven points, as Brian Healy's extra point kick went wide left in the second quarter, and the Wolverines also missed on field goal attempts of 34 yards (by Frank Titas, wide left in the second quarter) and 26 yards (by Mike Hankwitz). Michigan quarterback Dick Vidmer completed 10 of 19 passes for 70 yards.

=== Navy ===
Week 3: Navy at Michigan

Team	1	2	3	4	Total
• Navy	10	7	3	6	26
Michigan	14	0	0	7	21

- Date: October 7
- Location: Ann Arbor, MI
- Game attendance: 72,361

Scoring summary
1	MICH	Ron Johnson 62-yard run (Mike Hankwitz kick)	MICH 7–0
1	NAVY	Balsy 3-yard run (John Church kick)	TIE 7–7
1	NAVY	Church 31-yard field goal	NAVY 10–7
1	MICH	Warren Sipp 3-yard run (Hankwitz kick)	MICH 14–10
2	NAVY	Rob Taylor 15-yard pass from John Cartwright (Church kick)	NAVY 17–14
3	NAVY	Church 28-yard field goal	NAVY 20–14
4	MICH	Ron Johnson 72-yard run (Hankwitz kick)	MICH 21–20
4	NAVY	Terry Murray 25-yard run (pass failed)	NAVY 26–21

On October 7, Michigan lost to Navy, 26–21, before a crowd of 72,361 at Michigan Stadium. Michigan halfback Ron Johnson rushed for 270 yards, including touchdown runs of 62 and 72 yards. Johnson's effort broke the Michigan single-game rushing record of 216 yards set in 1943 by Bill Daley.

=== Michigan State ===
Week 4: Michigan State at Michigan

Team	1	2	3	4	Total
• Michigan State	7	20	0	7	34
Michigan	0	0	0	0	0

- Date: October 14
- Location: Ann Arbor, MI
- Game attendance: 103,210

Scoring summary
1	MSU	Jimmy Raye 2-yard run (Mitch Pruiett kick)	MSU 7–0
2	MSU	Raye 2-yard run (Pruiett kick)	MSU 14–0
2	MSU	Al Brenner 65-yard pass from Raye (Pruiett kick)	MSU 21–0
2	MSU	Raye 2-yard run (kick failed)	MSU 27–0
4	MSU	Frank Foreman 8-yard pass from Raye (Pruiett failed)	MSU 34–0

On October 14, Michigan lost to rival Michigan State by a 34–0 before a crowd of 103,210 at Michigan Stadium in Ann Arbor. It was Michigan State's largest margin of victory ever against Michigan. Michigan State quarterback Jimmy Raye scored three rushing touchdowns and passed for the other two. Three of the Spartans' touchdowns came in the last two-and-a-half minutes of the first half. For the Wolverines, Ron Johnson rushed for 107 yards on 24 carries.

=== Indiana ===
Week 5: Indiana at Michigan

Team	1	2	3	4	Total
• Indiana	14	6	0	7	27
Michigan	0	7	7	6	20

- Date: October 21
- Location: Ann Arbor, MI
- Game attendance: 103,210

Scoring summary
1	IU	John Isenbarger 26-yard run (Warner kick)	IU 7–0
1	IU	Stolberg 8-yard pass from Harry Gonso (Warner kick)	IU 14–0
2	IU	Jade Butcher 41-yard pass from Isenbarger (kick missed)	IU 20–0
2	MICH	Dennis Brown 3-yard run (Mike Hankwitz kick)	IU 20–7
3	MICH	Brown 1-yard run (Hankwitz kick)	IU 20–14
4	MICH	Ron Johnson 1-yard run (kick failed)	TIE 20–20
4	IU	Isenbarger 1-yard run (Warner kick)	IU 27–20

On October 21, Michigan lost to Indiana, 27–20, before a homecoming crowd of only 65,759 at Michigan Stadium in Ann Arbor. Led by quarterback Harry Gonso, halfback John Isenbarger, and flanker Jade Butcher, Indiana jumped to a 20–0 lead in the second quarter. Michigan followed with three unanswered touchdowns to tie the score at 20–20 in the fourth quarter. Late in the fourth quarter, Indiana drove 85 yards, capped by a one-yard touchdown run by Isenbarger with 1:10 left in the game.

Isenbarger was the Hoosiers' biggest gainer with 101 rushing yards on 18 carries and 79 passing yards. In his first college start, Michigan quarterback Dennis Brown led the Wolverines to their best offensive game of the year with 399 yards of total offense. Brown rushed for 127 yards and two touchdowns and completed 18 of 31 passes for 211 yards and one interception. Halfback John Gabler, also in his first start, caught 10 passes for 101 yards. Mike Hankwitz missed an extra point kick and a field goal attempt from the 12-yard line.

=== Minnesota ===
Week 6: Michigan at Minnesota

Team	1	2	3	4	Total
Michigan	12	3	0	0	15
• Minnesota	0	6	0	14	20

- Date: October 28
- Location: Minneapolis
- Game attendance: 50,006

Scoring summary
1	MICH	Ron Johnson 59-yard run (kick failed)	MICH 6–0
1	MICH	Johnson 1-yard run (kick failed)	MICH 12–0
2	MICH	Mike Hankwitz 22-yard field goal	MICH 15–0
2	MINN	Curt Wilson 5-yard run (kick failed)	MICH 15–7
4	MINN	Mike Curtis 45-yard pass from Wilson (Stein kick)	MICH 15–14
4	MINN	Wilson 3-yard run (Stein kick)	MINN 21–15

On October 28, Michigan lost to Minnesota, 20–15, before a crowd of 50,006 at Memorial Stadium in Minneapolis. Michigan took a 20-0 lead on two touchdown runs from Ron Johnson (including a 59-yarder) and a Mike Hankwitz field goal. Minnesota came back to win with two fourth-quarter touchdowns. Michigan quarterback Dennis Brown rushed for 65 yards and completed 9 of 21 passes for 94 yards and an interception. Ron Johnson rushed for 94 yards, and defensive back Tom Curtis intercepted two passes. The loss was the fifth in a row for the Wolverines.

=== Northwestern ===
Week 7: Northwestern at Michigan

Team	1	2	3	4	Total
Northwestern	7	0	0	0	7
• Michigan	0	0	7	3	10

- Date: November 4
- Location: Ann Arbor, MI
- Game attendance: 62,063

Scoring summary
2		NW	Dick Emmerich field goal from 18-yard line	NW 3–0
2	5:22	MICH	Dennis Brown 1-yard run (Mike Hankwitz kick)	MICH 7–3

On November 4, Michigan ended its five-game losing streak with a 7-3 victory over Northwestern, before a crowd of 62,063 at a snowy Michigan Stadium. The victory was the 500th in program history. Ron Johnson set a Big Ten record with 42 carries, totaling 167 rushing yards. Quarterback Dennis Brown scored the game's only touchdown on a one-yard run in the second quarter. Brown completed 10 of 22 passes for 77 yards and no interceptions.

=== Illinois ===
Week 8: Michigan at Illinois

Team	1	2	3	4	Total
• Michigan	0	0	14	7	21
Illinois	7	7	0	0	14

- Date: November 11
- Location: Champaign, IL
- Game attendance: 44,236

Scoring summary
1	ILL	Rich Johnson 15-yard run (McKissic kick)	ILL 7–0
2	ILL	Rich Johnson 7-yard run (McKissic kick)	ILL 14–0
3	MICH	Jim Berline 7-yard pass from Dennis Brown (kick failed)	ILL 14–6
3	MICH	George Hoey 60-yard punt return (Tom Weinmann pass from Brown)	TIE 14–14
4	MICH	Ron Johnson 3-yard run (Frank Titas kick)	MICH 21–14

On November 11, Michigan defeated Illinois, 21–14, before a crowd of 44,237 at Memorial Stadium in Champaign, Illinois. Illinois led, 14-0, at halftime after Rich Johnson ran for two touchdowns. Michigan scored three touchdowns in the second half, including a 60-yard punt return by George Hoey. Dennis Brown completed 10 of 23 passes for 87 yards, a touchdown, and two interceptions. Ron Johnson rushed for 61 yards and a touchdown on 23 carries.

=== Wisconsin ===
Week 9: Michigan at Wisconsin

Team	1	2	3	4	Total
• Michigan	7	7	13	0	27
Wisconsin	7	0	0	7	14

- Date: November 18
- Location: Madison, WI
- Game attendance: 44,721

Scoring summary
1	WIS	John Boyajian 1-yard run (Schinke kick)	WIS 7–0
1	MICH	Dennis Brown 44-yard run (Frank Titas kick)	TIE 7–7
2	MICH	John Gabler 8-yard run (Titas kick)	MICH 14–7
3	MICH	Jim Berline 60-yard pass from D. Brown (Titas kick)	MICH 21–7
3	MICH	Ron Johnson 30-yard pass from D. Brown (kick failed)	MICH 27–7
4	WIS	Boyajian 8-yard run (Schinke kick)	MICH 27–14

On November 18, Michigan won its third consecutive game, defeating Wisconsin, 27–14, before a crowd of 44,721 at Camp Randall Stadium in Madison, Wisconsin. Quarterback Dennis Brown completed 12 of 17 passes for 232 yards and two touchdowns, including a 60-yard touchdown connection with Jim Berline. Brown also scored on a 44-yard touchdown run. Right halfback Ron Johnson gained 33 rushing yards, enabling him to break Tom Harmon's Michigan record of 884 yards in 1939.

=== Ohio State ===
Week 10: Ohio State at Michigan

Team	1	2	3	4	Total
• Ohio State	14	7	0	3	24
Michigan	0	7	0	7	14

- Date: November 25
- Location: Ann Arbor, MI
- Game attendance: 64,144
- Television network: ABC

Scoring summary
1		OHIO	Rudy Hubbard 22-yard run (Gary Cairns kick)	OHIO 7–0
1		OHIO	Hubbard 22-yard run (Cairns kick)	OHIO 14–0
2		OHIO	Long 1-yard run (Cairns kick)	OHIO 21–0
2		MICH	Jim Berline 6-yard pass from Dennis Brown (Frank Titas kick)	OHIO 21–7
4		MICH	John Gabler 13-yard pass from Dennis Brown (Titas kick)	OHIO 21–14
4	1:59	OHIO	Cairns 37-yard field goal	OSU 24–14

On November 25, Michigan lost to Ohio State, 24–14, before a crowd of 64,144 at Michigan Stadium. Ohio State jumped to a 21–0 lead in the second quarter before Michigan attempted a comeback with a six-yard touchdown pass from Dennis Brown to Jim Berline and a 13-yard touchdown pass from Brown to John Gabler. Ohio State then put the game away, kicking a field goal with 1:59 remaining in the game.

Ron Johnson gained 96 rushing yards to extend his single-season Michigan rushing record to 1,005 yards. Jim Berline caught eight passes for 89 yards. For Ohio State, Jim Otis gained 114 yards, and Rudy Hubbard added 104 yards. Michigan's athletic director Fritz Crisler and university president Harlan Hatcher, both of whom had announced their retirements, were honored by the Michigan Marching Band in a halftime ceremony.

== Personnel ==
1967 Michigan Wolverines football team roster
Players
Coaches
**Offense**

Pos.	#	Name	Class
OL		Bob Baumgartner
WR		Jim Berline
OL		Stan Broadnax
QB		Dennis Brown
RB		Garvie Craw
OL		Joe Dayton **(C)**
OL		Alan Francis
WR		John Gabler
RB		Ron Johnson
OL		Pete Mair
WR		Jim Mandich
OL		Bob Penska
OL		Ray Phillips
OL		Robert Ritley
OL		Peter Sarantos
RB		Ernie Sharpe
RB		Warren Sipp
FB, K		Frank Titas
QB		Dick Vidmer
WR		Tom Weinmann
OL		George Zuganellis

**Defense**

Pos.	#	Name	Class
DB		Tom Curtis
DB		Jerry Hartman
DB		Brian Healy
DB		George Hoey
DL		Jon Kramer
DL		Jerry Miklos
DL		Dennis Monthel
LB		Dennis Morgan
DB		Barry Pierson
DL		Dave Porter
LB		Rocky Rosema
DL		Phil Seymour
DL		Thomas Takach
LB		Bob Wedge
DL		Jim Wilhite
DL		Dick Williamson

**Special teams**

Pos.	#	Name	Class

Head coach

- Bump Elliott

Coordinators/assistant coaches

- Don James (DB)
- Y C McNease

Legend

- **(C)** Team captain
- **(S)** Suspended
- **(I)** Ineligible
- Injured
- Redshirt

=== Letter winners ===
The following players received varsity letters for their participation on the 1967 football team. Players starting at least five games are displayed in bold.

==== Offense ====
- **Bob Baumgartner**, 6'0", 219 pounds, junior, Chicago, Illinois - started 6 games at right guard
- **Jim Berline**, 6'0", 185 pounds, junior, Niles, Ohio - started 7 games at right end
- Stanley Broadnax, 6'0", 226 pounds, senior, Cincinnati, Ohio - offensive tackle
- **Dennis Brown**, 5'10", 175 pounds, junior, Lincoln Park, Michigan - started 6 games at quarterback
- Garvie Craw, 6'2", 211 pounds, sophomore, Montclair, New Jersey - started 3 games at fullback
- **Joe Dayton**, 6'2", 225 pounds, senior, Detroit, Michigan - started 8 games at center
- Peter Drehmann, 6'1", 206 pounds, sophomore, Abington, Pennsylvania - offensive tackle
- **John Gabler**, 6'2", 208 pounds, sophomore, Royal Oak, Michigan - started 5 games at left halfback
- Paul Johnson, 6'0", 231 pounds, senior, Bay City, Michigan - offensive tackle
- **Ron Johnson**, 6'1", 196 pounds, junior, Detroit, Michigan - started 7 games at right halfback
- **Peter Mair**, 6'4", 228 pounds, senior, Allentown, Pennsylvania - started 6 games at right tackle, 1 game at left tackle
- **Jim Mandich**, 6'3", 215 pounds, sophomore, Solon, Ohio - started 6 games at left end
- Gerald Miklos, 6'3", 227 pounds, junior, Chicago, Illinois - started 1 game at offensive left tackle
- **Bob Penska**, 6'1", 225 pounds, junior, Niles, Ohio - started 5 games at left tackle, 1 game at right tackle
- **Ray Phillips**, 6'3", 229 pounds, senior, Evanston, Illinois - started 7 games at left guard
- Ernest Sharpe, 5'11", 191 pounds, senior, Palos Heights, Illinois - started 2 games at left halfback
- Warren Sipp, 6'1", 209 pounds, junior, Akron, Ohio - started 3 games at fullback
- Royce Spencer, 6'1", 208 pounds, senior, Chicago, Illinois - end
- Frank Titas, 6'2", 205 pounds, sophomore, Cleveland, Ohio - started 4 games at fullback
- Dick Vidmer, 6'1", 183 pounds, senior, Greensburg, Pennsylvania - started 4 games at quarterback
- Thomas Weinman, 6'2", 214 pounds, sophomore, Ann Arbor, Michigan - started 1 game at left end, 1 game at right end, 1 game at left tackle
- Richard Yanz, 6'1", 217 pounds, junior, Chicago, Illinois - started 2 games at right guard

==== Defense ====
- **Tom Curtis**, 6'1", 184 pounds, Aurora, Ohio - started 8 games at safety, 1 game at cornerback
- Alfred Doty, 5'10", 187 pounds, senior, Mount Morris, Michigan - started 1 game at safety
- **Tom Goss**, 6'2", 225 pounds, senior, Knoxville, Tennessee - started 6 games at left defensive tackle, 1 game as offensive guard, 1 game as offensive tackle
- Mike Hankwitz, 6'1", 194 pounds, sophomore, Scottville, Michigan - linebacker
- **Jerry Hartman**, 6'1", 170 pounds, junior, Ann Arbor, Michigan - started 10 games at safety, 2 games at right halfback
- **Brian Healy**, 6'1", 170 pounds, sophomore, Sandusky, Ohio - started 8 games at cornerback, 1 game at left halfback
- Jon Heffelfinger, 6'2", 205 pounds, senior, Battle Creek, Michigan - started 2 games at left defensive end
- **George Hoey**, 5'10", 169 pounds, junior, Flint, Michigan - started 8 games at cornerback, 2 games at left halfback
- **Jon Kramer**, 6'3", 215 pounds, junior, Toledo, Ohio - started 7 games at right defensive end, 1 game at offensive end
- **Dennis Monthei**, 6'2", 201 pounds, senior, Detroit, Michigan - started 5 games at middle guard, 1 game at linebacker, 2 games at offensive guard
- **Dennis Morgan**, 5'11", 215 pounds, senior, Phoenixville, Pennsylvania - started 5 games at middle guard, 6 games at linebacker, 1 game at offensive tackle, 1 game at center, 1 game at halfback
- Douglas Nelson, 6'1", 181 pounds, senior, Adrian, Michigan - started 3 games at cornerback
- Barry Pierson, 6'0", 173 pounds, sophomore, St. Ignace, Michigan - started 1 game at safety
- **Dave Porter**, 6'3", 231 pounds, senior, Lansing, Michigan - started 10 games at defensive right tackle, 3 games at offensive tackle
- **Rocky Rosema**, 6'2", 225 pounds, senior, Grand Rapids, Michigan - started 5 games at linebacker, 4 games at left defensive end, 2 games at offensive end, 1 game at offensive guard
- **Phil Seymour**, 6'4", 195 pounds, sophomore, Berkley, Michigan - started 4 games at left defensive end, 1 game at right defensive end, 1 game at offensive end
- **Tom Stincic**, 6'3", 217 pounds, junior, Cleveland, Ohio - started 4 games at linebacker, 2 games at right defensive end, 1 game at offensive end, 1 game at offensive guard
- Robert Wedge, 6'2", 201 pounds, junior, Port Huron, Michigan - started 2 games at linebacker, 1 game at center
- James Wilhite - 6'3", 204 pounds, junior, Bay City, Michigan - middle guard
- Richard Williamson, 6'4", 227 pounds, senior, East Detroit, Michigan - started 4 games at left defensive tackle

=== Non-letter winners ===
- Cecil Pryor - started 2 games at linebacker

=== Coaching staff ===
Michigan's 1967 coaching, training, and support staff included the following persons.

- Head coach: Bump Elliott
- Assistant coaches:

- Henry Fonde - offensive backfield coach
- George Mans - offensive ends coach
- Tony Mason - offensive line coach
- Don James - defensive backfield coach
- Y C McNease - defensive ends and linebackers coach
- Dennis Fitzgerald - defensive line coach
- Bill Dodd - freshmen football coach

- Trainer: Jim Hunt
- Manager: Stephen Kenney

=== Award season ===
No Michigan players received first-team honors on the 1967 All-America team. However, three players received second- or third-team honors as follows: running back Ron Johnson (CP-2); offensive guard Ray Phillips (CP-3, UPI-2); and center Joe Dayton (CP-3).

Seven Michigan players received recognition from the Associated Press (AP) or United Press International (UPI) on the 1967 All-Big Ten Conference football team as follows: center Joe Dayton (AP-1, UPI-1); running back Ron Johnson (AP-1, UPI-1); linebacker Tom Stincic (UPI-1); linebacker Dennis Morgan (AP-2, UPI-2); offensive end Jim Berline (AP-2); cornerback George Hoey (AP-2); and offensive guard Ray Phillips (UPI-2).

Team awards were presented as follows:

- Most Valuable Player: Ron Johnson
- Meyer Morton Award: Dick Yanz
- John Maulbetsch Award: Jim Mandich
- Arthur Robinson Scholarship Award: Dick Vidmer

== Statistical leaders ==
Michigan's individual statistical leaders for the 1967 season include those listed below.

=== Rushing ===
Player	Attempts	Net yards	Yards per attempt	Touchdowns
Ron Johnson	210	982	4.7	6
Dennis Brown	137	358	2.6	4
Warren Sipp	24	104	4.3	1
Garvie Craw	29	101	3.5	0
Ernie Sharpe	33	98	3.0	1

=== Passing ===
Player	Attempts	Completions	Interceptions	Comp %	Yards	Yds/Comp	TD
Dennis Brown	155	82	7	52.9	928	11.3	7
Dick Vidmer	76	33	4	43.4	337	10.2	0

=== Receiving ===
Player	Receptions	Yards	Yds/Recp	TD	Long
Jim Berline	48	576	12.0	3	
Jim Mandich	25	248	9.9	0	21
Ron Johnson	11	176	16.0	1	21
John Gabler	20	173	8.7	1	

=== Kickoff returns ===
Player	Returns	Yards	Yds/Return	TD	Long
Ron Johnson	23	433	18.8	0	35
Frank Titas	4	71	17.8	0	24

=== Punt returns ===
Player	Returns	Yards	Yds/Return	TD	Long
George Hoey	12	291	24.3	1	60
Jerry Hartman	9	63	7.0	0	20
Tom Curtis	5	30	6.0	0	9
