= 1967 Big Ten Conference football season =

- Sport: American football
- Teams: 10

1968 NFL/AFL draft
- Top draft pick: John Williams
- Co-champions: Indiana, Minnesota, Purdue
- Season MVP: Leroy Keyes

Seasons
- 1966 1968

1967 Big Ten Conference football standings
	Conf.					Overall
Team	W		L		T	W		L		T
No. 4 Indiana +	6	–	1	–	0	9	–	2	–	0
Minnesota +	6	–	1	–	0	8	–	2	–	0
No. 9 Purdue +	6	–	1	–	0	8	–	2	–	0
Ohio State	5	–	2	–	0	6	–	3	–	0
Illinois	3	–	4	–	0	4	–	6	–	0
Michigan	3	–	4	–	0	4	–	6	–	0
Michigan State	3	–	4	–	0	3	–	7	–	0
Northwestern	2	–	5	–	0	3	–	7	–	0
Iowa	0	–	6	–	1	1	–	8	–	1
Wisconsin	0	–	6	–	1	0	–	9	–	1
+ – Conference co-champions; Rankings from AP Poll

The 1967 Big Ten Conference football season was the 72nd season of college football played by the member schools of the Big Ten Conference and was a part of the 1967 NCAA University Division football season.

The season resulted in a three-way tie for the conference championship, as Indiana, Purdue, and Minnesota each finished with a conference record of 6–1. Each team was 1–1 against the others; as Indiana defeated Purdue, Purdue defeated Minnesota, and Minnesota defeated Indiana. As of December 6th 2025, this was the last conference championship for Minnesota. Purdue has won one conference title since then, in 2000.

The 1967 Indiana Hoosiers football team, under head coach John Pont, was ranked No. 4 in the final AP Poll. The Hoosiers lost to USC in the 1968 Rose Bowl. Quarterback Harry Gonso was selected as the team's most valuable player.

The 1967 Purdue Boilermakers football team, under head coach Jack Mollenkopf, was ranked No. 9 in the final AP Poll. Purdue running back Leroy Keyes led the conference with 114 points scored, was a consensus first-team All-American, won the Chicago Tribune Silver Football trophy as the most valuable player in the conference, and finished third in the voting for the 1968 Heisman Trophy.

The 1967 Minnesota Golden Gophers football team, under head coach Murray Warmath, was unranked in the final AP Poll (which ranked only ten teams at the time), but was 14th in the final Coaches Poll. Offensive tackle John Williams was the first Big Ten player selected in the 1968 NFL/AFL draft with the 23rd overall pick.

Due to Big Ten's "no-repeat" policy barring teams from making consecutive Rose Bowl appearances, Purdue was ineligible. The next tiebreaker was the team which had gone the longest since last playing in Pasadena. Since Indiana had never been, and Minnesota appeared following the 1960 and '61 seasons, the Hoosiers got the nod despite their loss to the Gophers.

== Season overview ==
=== Results and team statistics ===
Conf. Rank	Team	Head coach	AP final	AP high	Overall record	Conf. record	PPG	PAG	MVP
1 (tie)	Indiana	John Pont	#4	#4	9–2	6–1	17.9	14.5	Harry Gonso
1 (tie)	Minnesota	Murray Warmath	NR	NR	8–2	6–1	16.3	10.6	Tom Sakal
1 (tie)	Purdue	Jack Mollenkopf	#9	#2	8–2	6–1	29.1	15.4	**Leroy Keyes**
4	Ohio State	Woody Hayes	NR	NR	6–3	5–2	16.1	13.3	Dick Worden
5 (tie)	Illinois	Jim Valek	NR	NR	4–6	3–4	14.3	21.3	John Wright
5 (tie)	Michigan	Bump Elliott	NR	NR	4–6	3–4	14.4	17.9	Ron Johnson
5 (tie)	Michigan State	Duffy Daugherty	NR	#3	3–7	3–4	17.3	19.3	Dwight Lee
8	Northwestern	Alex Agase	NR	NR	3–7	2–5	14.9	21.3	Bruce Gunstra
9 (tie)	Iowa	Ray Nagel	NR	NR	1–8–1	0–6–1	16.1	27.7	Silas McKinnie
9 (tie)	Wisconsin	John Coatta	NR	NR	0–9–1	0–6–1	12.0	22.4	Tom Domres

Key
AP final = Team's rank in the final AP Poll of the 1967 season
AP high = Team's highest rank in the AP Poll throughout the 1967 season
PPG = Average of points scored per game
PAG = Average of points allowed per game
MVP = Most valuable player as voted by players on each team as part of the voting process to determine the winner of the Chicago Tribune Silver Football trophy; trophy winner in bold

== Statistical leaders ==
The Big Ten's individual statistical leaders for the 1967 season include the following:

=== Passing yards ===
Rank	Name	Team	Yards
1	Mike Phipps	Purdue	1,800
2	Bill Melzer	Northwestern	1,146
3	Ed Podolak	Iowa	1,014
4	Dean Volkman	Illinois	1,005
5	John Boyajian	Wisconsin	966

=== Rushing yards ===
Rank	Name	Team	Yards
1	Ron Johnson	Michigan	1,005
2	Leroy Keyes	Purdue	986
3	Rich Johnson	Illinois	768
4	Perry Williams	Purdue	746
5	Silas McKinnie	Iowa	588

=== Receiving yards ===
Rank	Name	Team	Yards
1	Leroy Keyes	Purdue	758
2	Al Bream	Iowa	703
3	John Wright	Illinois	698
4	Jim Beirne	Purdue	643
5	Jim Berline	Michigan	624

=== Total yards ===
Rank	Name	Team	Yards
1	Mike Phipps	Purdue	2,020
2	Harry Gonso	Indiana	1,443
3	Ed Podolak	Iowa	1,337
4	Dennis Brown	Michigan	1,286
5	Bill Melzer	Northwestern	1,205

=== Scoring ===
Rank	Name	Team	Points
1	Leroy Keyes	Purdue	114
2	Perry Williams	Purdue	66
3	Jade Butcher	Indiana	60
4	Curt Wilson	Minnesota	48
5	Ron Johnson	Michigan	42
5	Chico Kurzawski	Northwestern	42

== Awards and honors ==
=== All-Big Ten honors ===
The following players were picked by the Associated Press (AP) and/or the United Press International (UPI) as first-team players on the 1967 All-Big Ten Conference football team.

Offense

Position	Name	Team	Selectors
Quarterback	Mike Phipps	Purdue	AP
Quarterback	Harry Gonso	Indiana	UPI
Running back	Leroy Keyes	Purdue	AP, UPI
Running back	Ron Johnson	Michigan	AP, UPI
Running back	Perry Williams	Purdue	AP, UPI [fullback]
Offensive end	Jim Beirne	Purdue	AP, UPI
Offensive end	John Wright	Illinois	AP
Offensive end	Billy Anders	Ohio State	UPI
Offensive tackle	John Williams	Minnesota	AP, UPI
Offensive tackle	Dick Himes	Ohio State	AP, UPI
Offensive guard	Bruce Gunstra	Northwestern	AP, UPI
Offensive guard	Gary Cassells	Indiana	AP, UPI
Center	Joe Dayton	Michigan	AP, UPI

Defense

Position	Name	Team	Selectors
Defensive end	Bob Stein	Minnesota	AP, UPI
Defensive end	George Olion	Purdue	UPI
Defensive end	George Chatlos	Michigan State	AP
Defensive tackle	McKinley Boston	Minnesota	AP, UPI
Defensive tackle	Lance Olssen	Purdue	UPI
Defensive tackle	Tom Domres	Wisconsin	AP
Middle guard	Chuck Kyle	Purdue	AP, UPI
Linebacker	Ken Criter	Wisconsin	AP, UPI
Linebacker	Dick Marvel	Purdue	UPI
Linebacker	Ken Kaczmarek	Indiana	AP
Linebacker	Jim Sniadecki	Indiana	AP
Linebacker	Tom Stincic	Michigan	UPI
Defensive back	Ron Bess	Illinois	AP, UPI
Defensive back	Tom Garretson	Northwestern	AP, UPI [safety]
Defensive back	Tom Sakal	Minnesota	AP, UPI

=== All-American honors ===
At the end of the 1967 season, only one Big Ten player secured consensus first-team honors on the 1967 College Football All-America Team. The Big Ten's consensus All-Americans was:

Position	Name	Team	Selectors
Running back	Leroy Keyes	Purdue	AFCA, AP, CP, FWAA, NEA, UPI, WC, Time, TSN

Other Big Ten players who were named first-team All-Americans by at least one selector were:

Position	Name	Team	Selectors
Offensive tackle	John Williams	Minnesota	Time
Offensive guard	Gary Cassells	Indiana	AP, FWAA, WCFF
Defensive end	Bob Stein	Minnesota	FWAA, NEA, WC

=== Other awards ===
The 1967 Heisman Trophy was awarded to Gary Beban of UCLA. Purdue running back Leroy Keyes finished third in the voting.

== 1968 NFL/AFL Draft ==
The following Big Ten players were among the first 100 picks in the 1968 NFL/AFL draft:

Name	Position	Team	Round	Overall pick
John Williams	Offensive tackle	Minnesota	1	23
Doug Crusan	Offensive tackle	Indiana	1	27
Cyril Pinder	Running back	Illinois	2	39
John Wright	Wide receiver	Illinois	2	53
Lance Olssen	Tackle	Purdue	3	65
Charlie Sanders	Tight end	Minnesota	3	74
Dick Himes	Tackle	Ohio State	3	81
Jess Phillips	Defensive back	Michigan State	4	84
