= Rosema =

Rosema may refer to:

- Rosema (moth) a tropical moth genus
- 6472 Rosema, a minor planet
- Rocky Rosema, American football player
