= 1967 Michigan State Spartans football team =

American college football season

1967 Michigan State Spartans football
- Conference: Big Ten Conference
- Record: 3–7 (3–4 Big Ten)
- Head coach: Duffy Daugherty (14th season)
- MVP: Dwight Lee
- Captains: Anthony Conti; Drake Garrett
- Home stadium: Spartan Stadium

1967 Big Ten Conference football standings
	Conf.					Overall
Team	W		L		T	W		L		T
No. 4 Indiana +	6	–	1	–	0	9	–	2	–	0
Minnesota +	6	–	1	–	0	8	–	2	–	0
No. 9 Purdue +	6	–	1	–	0	8	–	2	–	0
Ohio State	5	–	2	–	0	6	–	3	–	0
Illinois	3	–	4	–	0	4	–	6	–	0
Michigan	3	–	4	–	0	4	–	6	–	0
Michigan State	3	–	4	–	0	3	–	7	–	0
Northwestern	2	–	5	–	0	3	–	7	–	0
Iowa	0	–	6	–	1	1	–	8	–	1
Wisconsin	0	–	6	–	1	0	–	9	–	1
+ – Conference co-champions; Rankings from AP Poll

The 1967 Michigan State Spartans football team was an American football team that represented Michigan State University as a member of the Big Ten Conference during the 1967 Big Ten football season. In their 14th season under head coach Duffy Daugherty, the Spartans compiled a 3–7 record (3–4 in conference games), finished in sixth place in the Big Ten, and were outscored by a total of 193 to 173. After an undefeated 1966 season, the Spartans began the 1967 season ranked No. 3 in the AP poll. They quickly dropped from the polls, opening the season with losses to unranked Houston and No. 2 USC. In two other games against ranked opponents, they lost to No. 6 Indiana and No. 3 Purdue.

On offense, the Spartans gained 163.0 rushing yards and 107.6 passing yards per game. On defense, they gave up 182.2 rushing yards and 154.8 passing yards per game. The individual statistical leaders included quarterback Jimmy Raye with 580 passing yards, Dwight Lee with 497 rushing yards, and Allen Brenner with 26 receptions and 462 receiving yards. Lee was selected as the team's most valuable player.

Two Spartans were selected for the 1967 All-Big Ten Conference football teams. End George Chatlos received first-team honors from the Associated Press (AP) and second-team honors from the United Press International (UPI). Tackle Joe Przybycki received second-team honors from both the AP and UPI.

The team played its home games at Spartan Stadium in East Lansing, Michigan.

== Schedule ==
Date	Opponent	Rank	Site	Result	Attendance	Source
September 23	Houston*	No. 3	Spartan Stadium; East Lansing, MI	L 7–37	75,833	
September 30	No. 2 USC*		Spartan Stadium; East Lansing, MI	L 17–21	75,287	
October 7	Wisconsin		Spartan Stadium; East Lansing, MI	W 35–7	68,516	
October 14	at Michigan		Michigan Stadium; Ann Arbor, MI (rivalry)	W 34–0	103,210	
October 21	at Minnesota		Memorial Stadium; Minneapolis, MN	L 0–21	56,554	
October 28	at Notre Dame*		Notre Dame Stadium; Notre Dame, IN (rivalry)	L 12–24	59,075	
November 4	Ohio State^{†}		Spartan Stadium; East Lansing, MI	L 7–21	76,235	
November 11	No. 6 Indiana		Spartan Stadium; East Lansing, MI (rivalry)	L 13–14	71,023	
November 18	at No. 3 Purdue		Ross–Ade Stadium; West Lafayette, IN	L 7–21	61,364	
November 25	Northwestern		Spartan Stadium; East Lansing, MI	W 41–27	45,022	
*Non-conference game; ^{†}Homecoming; Rankings from AP Poll released prior to the game

== Personnel ==
1967 Michigan State Spartans football team roster
Players
Coaches
Offense

Pos.	#	Name	Class
FB	45	Robert Apisa	Sr
RB	34	Dwight Lee	Sr
QB	16	James Raye	Sr

Defense

Pos.	#	Name	Class
DL	61	Charles Bailey	Jr
DB	30	Clifton Hardy	Fr

Special teams

Pos.	#	Name	Class

Head coach

- Duffy Daugherty

Coordinators/assistant coaches

Legend

- (C) Team captain
- (S) Suspended
- (I) Ineligible
- Injured
- Redshirt
