= Domres =

Domres is a surname. Notable people with the surname include:

- Marty Domres (1947–2025), American football player
- Tom Domres (1946–1999), American football player
