= 1967 Wisconsin Badgers football team =

American college football season

1967 Wisconsin Badgers football
- Conference: Big Ten Conference
- Record: 0–9–1 (0–6–1 Big Ten)
- Head coach: John Coatta (1st season)
- MVP: Tom Domres
- Captain: Tom Domres
- Home stadium: Camp Randall Stadium

1967 Big Ten Conference football standings
	Conf.					Overall
Team	W		L		T	W		L		T
No. 4 Indiana +	6	–	1	–	0	9	–	2	–	0
Minnesota +	6	–	1	–	0	8	–	2	–	0
No. 9 Purdue +	6	–	1	–	0	8	–	2	–	0
Ohio State	5	–	2	–	0	6	–	3	–	0
Illinois	3	–	4	–	0	4	–	6	–	0
Michigan	3	–	4	–	0	4	–	6	–	0
Michigan State	3	–	4	–	0	3	–	7	–	0
Northwestern	2	–	5	–	0	3	–	7	–	0
Iowa	0	–	6	–	1	1	–	8	–	1
Wisconsin	0	–	6	–	1	0	–	9	–	1
+ – Conference co-champions; Rankings from AP Poll

The 1967 Wisconsin Badgers football team was an American football team that represented the University of Wisconsin as a member of the Big Ten Conference during the 1967 Big Ten season. In their first year under head coach John Coatta, the Badgers compiled a 0–9–1 record (0–6–1 in conference games), tied for ninth place in the Big Ten, and were outscored by a total of 224 to 120. Coatta was hired as head coach in December 1966; he had been a quarterback for Wisconsin from 1949 to 1951.

The Badgers gained an average of 165.8 passing yards and 114.2 rushing yards per game. On defense, they gave up an average of 129.2 passing yards and 211.2 rushing yards per game. The team's individual statistical leaders included: quarterback John Boyajian (966 passing yards); running back John Smith (362 rushing yards); and wide receivers Tom McCauley (37 receptions for 525 yards) and Mel Reddick (42 receptions for 524 yards).

Defensive tackle Tom Domres was selected as the team captain and the team's most valuable player. Domres and linebacker Ken Criter won first-team All-Big Ten honors from the Associated Press and United Press International.

The Badgers played their home games at Camp Randall Stadium in Madison, Wisconsin.

== Schedule ==
Date	Opponent	Site	Result	Attendance	Source
September 23	at Washington*	Husky Stadium; Seattle, WA	L 0–17	54,500	
September 30	Arizona State*	Camp Randall Stadium; Madison, WI	L 16–42	49,327	
October 7	at Michigan State	Spartan Stadium; East Lansing, NI	L 7–35	68,516	
October 14	Pittsburgh*	Camp Randall Stadium; Madison, WI	L 11–13	46,995	
October 21	Iowa	Camp Randall Stadium; Madison, WI (rivalry)	T 21–21	59,512	
October 28	Northwestern^{†}	Camp Randall Stadium; Madison, WI	L 13–17	61,918	
November 4	at No. 7 Indiana	Seventeenth Street Football Stadium; Bloomington, IN	L 9–14	46,910	
November 11	at Ohio State	Ohio Stadium; Columbus, OH	L 15–17	65,470	
November 18	Michigan	Camp Randall Stadium; Madison, WI	L 14–27	44,721	
November 25	at Minnesota	Memorial Stadium; Minneapolis, MN (rivalry)	L 14–21	47,133	
*Non-conference game; ^{†}Homecoming; Rankings from AP Poll released prior to the game

== 1968 NFL/AFL draft ==
Player	Position	Round	Pick	NFL club
Tom Domres	Defensive end	10	268	Houston Oilers
Sam Wheeler	Linebacker	12	309	Pittsburgh Steelers
