= John Williams (offensive lineman, born 1945) =

American football player (1945–2012)

No. 75
- Positions: Tackle, Guard, Defensive end

Personal information
- Born: October 27, 1945; Jackson, Mississippi, U.S.
- Died: July 8, 2012 (aged 66); Minneapolis, Minnesota, U.S.
- Listed height: 6 ft 3 in (1.91 m)
- Listed weight: 256 lb (116 kg)

Career information
- High school: Edward D. Libbey (Toledo, Ohio)
- College: Minnesota (1964-1967)
- NFL draft: 1968: 1st round, 23rd overall pick

Career history
- Baltimore Colts (1968–1971); Los Angeles Rams (1972–1979)

Awards and highlights
- Super Bowl champion (V); NFL champion (1968); First-team All-Big Ten (1967)

Career NFL statistics
- Games played: 166
- Games started: 129
- Fumble recoveries: 2
- Stats at Pro Football Reference

John McKay Williams (October 27, 1945 – July 8, 2012) was a National Football League (NFL) offensive lineman from 1968 through 1979. During that span he appeared in two Super Bowls: Super Bowl III and Super Bowl V for the Baltimore Colts; but missed Super Bowl XIV for the Los Angeles Rams because of injury. He played college football at the University of Minnesota where he was a First-team All-Big Ten tackle in 1967 and led the Gophers to the Big Ten title. He was one of the fifteen plaintiffs in Mackey v. National Football League in which Judge Earl R. Larson declared that the Rozelle rule was a violation of antitrust laws on December 30, 1975. Williams died on July 8, 2012, in Minneapolis, Minnesota, at the age of 66, while out for a walk. He had recently been the recipient of a kidney transplant.

== Early life ==
Williams was born on October 27, 1945, in Jackson, Mississippi. He was one of nine children. Williams attended Edward D. Libbey High School in Toledo, Ohio. He was an All-City high school selection in both football and basketball; while also playing baseball and throwing shot put on the track team. He was a 6 ft 3 in (1.91 m) 215 lb. (97.5 kg) fullback and linebacker on the football team as a junior and senior, and had six 100-yard rushing games as a senior. In 1994, he was inducted into Toledo's City League Hall of Fame.

== College ==
Williams originally planned to attend Ohio State University, but after visiting the University of Minnesota he fell in love with the school and changed his plans. Williams graduated from Minnesota in 1969 with a Bachelor of Science degree in education. In the late 1970s, he would return with his family to live in Minnesota and practice dentistry, after his professional football career ended.

At Minnesota, he played fullback, defensive end and offensive tackle on the Golden Gophers' football team, under coach Murray Warmath. He played fullback as a sophomore, until suffering a hamstring injury that ended his season. When he returned to the team as a junior, he weighed 245-250 pounds (111.1-113.4 kg) and was moved to defensive end, where he finished the season second in the Big Ten in tackles for loss. As a senior, he was moved to offensive tackle, and was selected first-team All-Big Ten at offensive tackle by the Associated Press (AP) and United Press International (UPI). He was a UPI honorable mention All-American at tackle for the 1967 season.

The 1967 Golden Gophers tied Indiana and Purdue for the best record within the Big Ten (6–1), and went 8–2 overall; though it was Indiana that represented the Big Ten in the Rose Bowl that year. Among his teammates was future NFL Hall of Fame tight end Charlie Sanders, who like Williams was switched from defense to offense in 1967 (to tight end).

Williams was selected to play in the East-West Shrine game, the Coaches All-America Game, and the 1968 Chicago College All-Star Game against the Green Bay Packers.

== Professional career ==
The Baltimore Colts selected Williams in the first round of the 1968 NFL/AFL draft, 23rd overall. In 1968, Williams played in all 14 games for the 13–1 Colts, but did not start any games for the team that would win the NFL title (34–0 over the Cleveland Browns), but lose to the New York Jets in Super Bowl III. Williams was on the Colts Super Bowl III player roster but was not a starter. Williams started seven games at right guard in 1969, after starting left guard Glenn Ressler was injured and starting right guard Dan Sullivan moved to left guard to replace Ressler. Wililiams started all 14 games at right guard in both 1970 and 1971, when Ressler returned and Sullivan moved to right tackle.

He was the starting right guard in Super Bowl V, when the Colts defeated the Dallas Cowboys, 16–13. He had a fine game during the Super Bowl, playing against Cowboys tackle Jethro Pugh, who had played well on run defense, but never reached the Colts' quarterbacks. Williams had an especially good month, his wife giving birth to their son less than two weeks earlier, in addition to winning the Super Bowl.

In 1972, Robert Irsay became the Colts' owner by trading the Los Angeles Rams franchise to former Colts owner Carroll Rosenbloom (who had owned the Colts for 19 years). Before the 1972 season started, Irsay's new general manager Joe Thomas quickly traded Williams, who had played out his option, for the Rams 1974 No. 1 draft selection (who would be receiver Roger Carr, with the 24th pick).

He played behind Rams starting right tackle Harry Schuh in 1972. He was the Rams starting right tackle from 1973-78, starting in all 86 regular season games during that period. He tore a calf muscle in 1979, his final NFL season, and played in only 11 games, starting just seven at guard. The 1979 Rams reached Super Bowl XIV, but Williams was unable to play, with Dennis Harrah and Kent Hill starting as the guards and future Hall of Famer Jackie Slater starting at right tackle, as he did during the season. Williams was not on the Rams’ roster for Super Bowl XIV. His final appearance came in a win vs. the Atlanta Falcons on Monday Night Football in week 12.

In 1974, Williams was one of 15 NFL players who brought a lawsuit against the NFL for antitrust violations, chiefly involving imposition of the Rozelle Rule as a means to limit free agency for NFL players. The case was known as Mackey v. NFL. The players won the suit in 1975, after a 55 day trial before Minnesota United States District Court Judge Earl Larson but gave up some of the rights gained when negotiating a collective bargaining agreement two years later.

== Personal life and death ==
During the offseasons from 1972-74 he attended the University of Maryland in Baltimore and part-time thereafter, eventually graduating from its School of Dentistry in 1978. Williams also obtained a private pilot's license. He returned to Minnesota in the late 1970s to live there, and practice as a dentist.

In 1983, he served less than a year in prison in connection with selling cocaine; however in 1992 he received an award as Minneapolis’s city volunteer of the year for his work on urban revitalization. He also became a forensic dentist and was among those identifying the dead after the September 11, 2001 terrorist attacks in New York City.

He died on July 8, 2012, while taking a walk near his Minneapolis home, having recently received a kidney transplant.
