= 1967 Ohio State Buckeyes football team =

American college football season

1967 Ohio State Buckeyes football
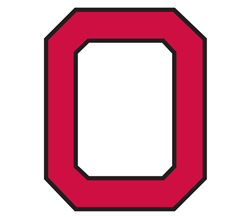
- Conference: Big Ten Conference
- Record: 6–3 (5–2 Big Ten)
- Head coach: Woody Hayes (17th season)
- Offensive scheme: Single-wing / T formation
- MVP: Dirk Worden
- Captains: Bill Ray Anders; Sam Elliott
- Home stadium: Ohio Stadium

1967 Big Ten Conference football standings
	Conf.					Overall
Team	W		L		T	W		L		T
No. 4 Indiana +	6	–	1	–	0	9	–	2	–	0
Minnesota +	6	–	1	–	0	8	–	2	–	0
No. 9 Purdue +	6	–	1	–	0	8	–	2	–	0
Ohio State	5	–	2	–	0	6	–	3	–	0
Illinois	3	–	4	–	0	4	–	6	–	0
Michigan	3	–	4	–	0	4	–	6	–	0
Michigan State	3	–	4	–	0	3	–	7	–	0
Northwestern	2	–	5	–	0	3	–	7	–	0
Iowa	0	–	6	–	1	1	–	8	–	1
Wisconsin	0	–	6	–	1	0	–	9	–	1
+ – Conference co-champions; Rankings from AP Poll

The 1967 Ohio State Buckeyes football team was an American football team that represented the Ohio State University in the 1967 Big Ten season. In their 17th year under head coach Woody Hayes, the Buckeyes compiled a 6–3 record (5–2 in conference games), finished in fourth place in the Big Ten, and outscored opponents by a total of 145 to 120. The 1967 team was the last Ohio State team that was not ranked in any week in the AP poll.

The team's statistical leaders included quarterback William Long (563 passing yards, 43.1% completion percentage, five rushing touchdowns), halfback Jim Otis (530 rushing yards, 3.8 yards per carry), and end Billy Anders (28 receptions for 403 yards). Five Ohio State players received recognition on the 1967 All-Big Ten Conference football team: offensive tackle Dick Himes (AP-1, UPI-1); Anders (UPI-1); linebacker Dirk Worden (AP-2, UPI-2); defensive back Ted Provost (AP-2, UPI-2); and offensive tackle Dave Foley (UPI-2).

The team played its home games at Ohio Stadium in Columbus, Ohio.

== Schedule ==
Date	Time	Opponent	Site	TV	Result	Attendance	Source
September 30	1:30 p.m.	Arizona*	Ohio Stadium; Columbus, OH		L 7–14	77,468	
October 7	4:30 p.m.	at Oregon*	Autzen Stadium; Eugene, OR		W 30–0	25,000	
October 14	1:30 p.m.	No. 2 Purdue	Ohio Stadium; Columbus, OH		L 6–41	84,069	
October 21		at Northwestern	Dyche Stadium; Evanston, IL		W 6–2	42,812	
October 28	1:30 p.m.	Illinois^{†}	Ohio Stadium; Columbus, OH (Illibuck)		L 13–17	83,928	
November 4	1:30 p.m.	at Michigan State	Spartan Stadium; East Lansing, MI		W 21–7	76,235	
November 11	1:30 p.m.	Wisconsin	Ohio Stadium; Columbus, OH		W 17–15	65,470	
November 18	1:30 p.m.	Iowa	Ohio Stadium; Columbus, OH		W 21–10	72,567	
November 25	1:30 p.m.	at Michigan	Michigan Stadium; Ann Arbor, MI (rivalry)	ABC	W 24–14	64,144	
*Non-conference game; ^{†}Homecoming; Rankings from AP Poll released prior to the game; All times are in Eastern time; Source:

== Game summaries ==
=== Arizona ===
Team	1	2	3	4	Total
• Arizona	0	7	7	0	14
Ohio State	7	0	0	0	7

- Date: September 30
- Location: Ohio Stadium, Columbus, Ohio
- Game attendance: 77,468
- Game weather: 56 °F (13 °C) Wind SW 15-20 mph

Scoring summary
Q1	4:59	OSU	Brungard 7 yard pass to Ehrsam (Cairns kick)	OSU 7–0
Q2	3:40	ARI	Edmonds 1 yard rush (Sarnoski kick)	TIED 7–7
Q3	10:59	TEAM	Lee 9 yard rush (Sarnoski kick)	ARI 7–14

=== Oregon ===
Team	1	2	3	4	Total
• Ohio State	13	3	7	7	30
Oregon	0	0	0	0	0

- Date: October 7
- Location: Autzen Stadium, Eugene, Oregon
- Game attendance: 25,000
- Game weather: Clear, warm

Scoring summary
Q1	12:09	OSU	Otis 1 yard run (Cairns kick)	OSU 0–7
Q1	8:49	OSU	Hubbard 3 yard rush (kick failed)	OSU 0–13
Q2	0:00	OSU	Cairns 35 yard field goal	OSU 0–16
Q3	8:18	OSU	Huff 6 yard run (Cairns kick)	OSU 0–23
Q4	10:51	TEAM	Huff 1 yard run (Cairns kick)	OSU 0–30

=== Purdue ===
Team	1	2	3	4	Total
• Purdue	14	21	6	0	41
Ohio State	0	0	0	6	6

- Date: October 14
- Location: Ohio Stadium, Columbus, Ohio
- Game attendance: 84,069
- Game weather: Clear, wind W 5 mph, 54 °F (12 °C)

Scoring summary
Q1	14:02	PUR	Cribes 30 yard interception return (Baltzell kick)	PUR 0–7
Q1	2:53	PUR	Williams 1 yard run (Baltzell kick)	PUR 0–14
Q2	4:22	PUR	Phipps 5 yard pass to Griffith (Baltzell kick)	PUR 0–21
Q2	1:51	PUR	Phipps 25 yard pass to Bierne (Baltzell kick)	PUR 0–28
Q2	1:11	PUR	Keys 21 yard run (Baltzell kick)	PUR 0–35
Q3	0:44	PUR	Williams 7 yard run (kick failed)	PUR 0–41
Q4	0:28	OSU	Rusnak 10 yard pass to Anders (kick failed)	PUR 6–41

=== Northwestern ===
Team	1	2	3	4	Total
• Ohio State	0	0	6	0	6
Northwestern	0	0	0	2	2

- Date: October 21
- Location: Dyche Stadium, Evanston, Illinois
- Game attendance: 42,812
- Game weather: Fair

Scoring summary
Q3	11:17	OSU	Brungard 2 yard run (kick blocked)	OSU 0–6
Q4		NW	Ehrsam intentional safety due to grounding	OSU 2–6

=== Illinois ===
Team	1	2	3	4	Total
• Illinois	0	10	0	7	17
Ohio State	0	0	6	7	13

- Date: October 28
- Location: Ohio Stadium, Columbus, Ohio
- Game attendance: 83,928
- Game weather: Cloudy, 40 °F (4 °C)

Scoring summary
Q2	5:24	ILL	Jackson 14 yard run (McKissic kick)	ILL 0–7
Q2	0:07	ILL	McKissic 31 yard field goal	ILL 0–10
Q3	13:37	OSU	Brungard 67 yard run (pass failed)	ILL 6–10
Q4	6:13	OSU	Long 9 yard pass to Anders (Cairns kick)	OSU 13–10
Q4	0:34	ILL	Jackson 1 yard run (McKissic kick)	ILL 13–17

=== Michigan State ===
Team	1	2	3	4	Total
• Ohio State	14	0	0	7	21
Mich. State	0	7	0	0	7

- Date: November 4
- Location: Spartan Stadium, East Lansing, Michigan
- Game attendance: 76,235
- Game weather: Cold, snowy

Scoring summary
Q1	6:13	OSU	Huff 1 yard run (Cairns kick)	OSU 7–0
Q1	0:56	OSU	Long 4 yard run (Cairns kick)	OSU 14–0
Q2	5:43	MSU	Doe xx yard pass/run to Doe (Doe kick)	OSU 14–7
Q4	10:58	OSU	Doe xx yard pass/run to Doe (Doe kick)	OSU 21–7

=== Wisconsin ===
Team	1	2	3	4	Total
Wisconsin	6	0	9	0	15
• Ohio State	3	7	0	7	17

- Date: November 11
- Location: Ohio Stadium
- Game attendance: 65,470
- Game weather: Rain, wind S 20-25, 49 °F (9 °C)

Scoring summary
Q1	8:16	OSU	Cairns 19 yard field goal	OSU 3–0
Q1	3:38	WIS	Boyajian 4 yard pass to Reddick (kick failed)	WIS 3–6
Q2	0:04	OSU	Long 14 yard run (Cairns kick)	OSU 10–6
Q3	6:47	WIS	Schinle 43 yard field goal	OSU 10–9
Q3	2:43	WIS	Boyajian 51 yard pass to Schumitsch (pass failed)	WIS 10–15
Q4	11:00	OSU	Long 4 yard run (Cairns kick)	OSU 17–15

=== Iowa ===
Team	1	2	3	4	Total
Iowa	0	10	0	0	10
• Ohio State	6	6	6	3	21

- Date: November 18
- Location: Ohio Stadium
- Game attendance: 72,567
- Game weather: Cloudy, wind SW 25-35 mph, 42 °F (6 °C)

Scoring summary
Q1	9:21	OSU	Otis 7 yard run (kick failed)	OSU 6–0
Q2	4:20	IOWA	McKinnie 1 yard run (Anderson kick)	IOWA 6–7
Q2	1:09	OSU	Long 3 yard run (pass failed)	OSU 12–7
Q2	0:19	IOWA	Anderson 42 yard field goal	OSU 12–10
Q3	8:35	OSU	Long 10 yard pass to Anders (pass failed)	OSU 18–10
Q4	0:56	OSU	Cairns 20 yard field goal	OSU 21–10

=== At Michigan ===
Ohio State Buckeyes (5–3) at Michigan Wolverines (4–5)

Quarter	1	2	3	4	Total
Ohio St	14	7	0	3	24
Michigan	0	7	0	7	14

at Michigan Stadium, Ann Arbor, Michigan

- Date: November 25, 1967
- Game weather: Sunny
- Game attendance: 64,144
- Box Score

Rudy Hubbard, who had only carried the ball 45 times in his three-year career prior to the game, rushed for 104 yards on 15 carries and scored the first two touchdowns of the game.

External videos
- Game highlights (part 1)
- Game highlights (part 2)

Team	Category	Player	Statistics
Ohio St	Passing	Bill Long	5/6, 45 Yds
Ohio St	Rushing	Jim Otis	26 Rush, 114 Yds
Ohio St	Receiving	David Brungard	1 Rec, 25 Yds
Michigan	Passing	Dennis Brown	17/24, 179 Yds, 2 TD, INT
Michigan	Rushing	Ron Johnson	20 Rush, 102 Yds
Michigan	Receiving	Jim Berline	8 Rec, 89 Yds, TD

Scoring summary

Quarter	Time	Drive			Team	Scoring information	Score	
Quarter	Time	Plays	Yards	TOP	Team	Scoring information	OSU	UM
1	9:55	10	79	5:05	Ohio St	Rudy Hubbard 22-yard touchdown run, Gary Cairns kick good	7	0
1	4:54	7	64		Ohio St	Rudy Hubbard 12-yard touchdown run, Gary Cairns kick good	14	0
2	8:20	7	53		Ohio St	Bill Long 1-yard touchdown run, Gary Cairns kick good	21	0
2	0:49	8	80		Michigan	Jim Berline 6-yard touchdown reception from Dennis Brown, Frank Titas kick good	21	7
4	7:27	6	47		Michigan	John Gabler 13-yard touchdown reception from Dennis Brown, Frank Titas kick good	21	14
4	1:59	11	54		Ohio St	37-yard field goal by Gary Cairns	24	14
"TOP" = time of possession. For other American football terms, see Glossary of American football.							24	14

== Personnel ==
=== Roster ===
1967 Ohio State Buckeyes football team roster
Players
Coaches
Offense

Pos.	#	Name	Class
WR	81	Billy Ray Anders	Sr
HB	12	David Brungard	So
QB	28	Jerry Ehrsam	Jr
OT	70	David Foley	Jr
OT	71	Dick Himes	Sr
HB	41	Rudy Hubbard	Sr
QB	24	Bill Long	Jr
FB	35	Jim Otis	So

Defense

Pos.	#	Name	Class
DB	30	Thomas Portsmouth	Sr
DE	88	David Whitfield	So
LB	56	Dirk Worden	Jr

Special teams

Pos.	#	Name	Class
K	90	Gary Cairns	Sr

Head coach

- Woody Hayes

Coordinators/assistant coaches

Legend

- (C) Team captain
- (S) Suspended
- (I) Ineligible
- Injured
- Redshirt

Roster
Last update: 2022-Dec-25

== 1968 NFL draftees ==
Player	Round	Pick	Position	NFL club
Dick Himes	3	81	Tackle	Green Bay Packers
