= 1967 Northwestern Wildcats football team =

American college football season

1967 Northwestern Wildcats football
- Conference: Big Ten Conference
- Record: 3–7 (2–5 Big Ten)
- Head coach: Alex Agase (4th season)
- MVP: Bruce Gunstra
- Captain: Bruce Gunstra
- Home stadium: Dyche Stadium

1967 Big Ten Conference football standings
	Conf.					Overall
Team	W		L		T	W		L		T
No. 4 Indiana +	6	–	1	–	0	9	–	2	–	0
Minnesota +	6	–	1	–	0	8	–	2	–	0
No. 9 Purdue +	6	–	1	–	0	8	–	2	–	0
Ohio State	5	–	2	–	0	6	–	3	–	0
Illinois	3	–	4	–	0	4	–	6	–	0
Michigan	3	–	4	–	0	4	–	6	–	0
Michigan State	3	–	4	–	0	3	–	7	–	0
Northwestern	2	–	5	–	0	3	–	7	–	0
Iowa	0	–	6	–	1	1	–	8	–	1
Wisconsin	0	–	6	–	1	0	–	9	–	1
+ – Conference co-champions; Rankings from AP Poll

The 1967 Northwestern Wildcats team represented Northwestern University during the 1967 Big Ten Conference football season. In their fourth year under head coach Alex Agase, the Wildcats compiled a 3–7 record (2–5 against Big Ten Conference opponents) and finished in eighth place in the Big Ten Conference.

The team's offensive leaders were quarterback Bill Melzer with 1,146 passing yards, Bob Olson with 507 rushing yards, and Don Anderson with 376 receiving yards.

== Schedule ==
Date	Opponent	Site	Result	Attendance	Source
September 23	No. 8 Miami (FL)*	Dyche Stadium; Evanston, IL	W 12–7	38,780	
September 30	Missouri*	Dyche Stadium; Evanston, IL	L 6–13	35,214	
October 7	at No. 4 Purdue	Ross–Ade Stadium; West Lafayette, IN	L 16–25	61,093	
October 14	at Rice*	Rice Stadium; Houston, TX	L 6–50	23,000	
October 21	Ohio State	Dyche Stadium; Evanston, IL	L 2–6	42,812	
October 28	at Wisconsin	Camp Randall Stadium; Madison, WI	W 17–13	61,918	
November 4	at Michigan	Michigan Stadium; Ann Arbor, MI (rivalry)	L 3–7	62,063	
November 11	Iowa	Dyche Stadium; Evanston, IL	W 39–24	32,050	
November 18	Illinois	Dyche Stadium; Evanston, IL (rivalry)	L 21–27	36,679	
November 25	at Michigan State	Spartan Stadium; East Lansing, MI	L 27–41	45,022	
*Non-conference game; Rankings from AP Poll released prior to the game
