= 1967 Iowa Hawkeyes football team =

American college football season

1967 Iowa Hawkeyes football
- Conference: Big Ten Conference
- Record: 1–8–1 (0–6–1 Big Ten)
- Head coach: Ray Nagel (2nd season)
- MVP: Silas McKinnie
- Captains: Silas McKinnie; Tony Williams
- Home stadium: Iowa Stadium

1967 Big Ten Conference football standings
	Conf.					Overall
Team	W		L		T	W		L		T
No. 4 Indiana +	6	–	1	–	0	9	–	2	–	0
Minnesota +	6	–	1	–	0	8	–	2	–	0
No. 9 Purdue +	6	–	1	–	0	8	–	2	–	0
Ohio State	5	–	2	–	0	6	–	3	–	0
Illinois	3	–	4	–	0	4	–	6	–	0
Michigan	3	–	4	–	0	4	–	6	–	0
Michigan State	3	–	4	–	0	3	–	7	–	0
Northwestern	2	–	5	–	0	3	–	7	–	0
Iowa	0	–	6	–	1	1	–	8	–	1
Wisconsin	0	–	6	–	1	0	–	9	–	1
+ – Conference co-champions; Rankings from AP Poll

The 1967 Iowa Hawkeyes football team was an American football team that represented the University of Iowa as a member of the Big Ten Conference during the 1967 Big Ten football season. In their second year under head coach Ray Nagel, the Hawkeyes compiled a 1–8–1 record (0–6–1 in conference game), finished in last place in the Big Ten, and were outscored by a total of 277 to 161.

The 1967 Hawkeyes gained 1,294 rushing yards and 1,748 passing yards. On defense, they gave up 2,544 rushing yards and 1,311 passing yards.

The team's statistical leaders included quarterback Ed Podolak (79-of-162 passing, 1,014 yards), Silas McKinnie (588 rushing yards, 56 points scored), Al Bream (55 receptions for 703 yards), Rod Barnhart (124 total tackles), and Steve Wilson (seven interceptions). McKinnie and defensive back Tony Williams were the team captains. McKinnie was selected as the team's most valuable player.

The team played its home games at Iowa Stadium in Iowa City, Iowa. Home attendance totaled 241,993, an average of 48,399 per game.

== Schedule ==
Date	Opponent	Site	Result	Attendance	Source
September 23	TCU*	Iowa Stadium; Iowa City, IA	W 24–9	46,731	
September 30	Oregon State*	Iowa Stadium; Iowa City, IA	L 18–38	48,313	
October 7	at No. 6 Notre Dame*	Notre Dame Stadium; Notre Dame, IN	L 6–56	59,075	
October 14	at Indiana	Seventeenth Street Stadium; Bloomington, IN	L 17–21	41,353	
October 21	at Wisconsin	Camp Randall Stadium; Madison, WI (rivalry)	T 21–21	59,512	
October 28	No. 7 Purdue^{†}	Iowa Stadium; Iowa City, IA	L 22–41	56,504	
November 4	Minnesota	Iowa Stadium; Iowa City, IA (rivalry)	L 0–10	54,731	
November 11	at Northwestern	Dyche Stadium; Evanston, IL	L 24–39	32,050	
November 18	at Ohio State	Ohio Stadium; Columbus, OH	L 10–21	72,567	
November 25	Illinois	Iowa Stadium; Iowa City, IA	L 19–21	35,714	
*Non-conference game; ^{†}Homecoming; Rankings from AP Poll released prior to the game

This was the first season since 1952 that Iowa faced Illinois, following the chaos of their last matchup.
