= 1967 Illinois Fighting Illini football team =

American college football season

1967 Illinois Fighting Illini football
- Conference: Big Ten Conference
- Record: 4–6 (3–4 Big Ten)
- Head coach: Jim Valek (1st season)
- Offensive coordinator: Ellis Rainsberger (1st season)
- MVP: John Wright
- Captains: Ron Bess; Ken Kmiec
- Home stadium: Memorial Stadium

1967 Big Ten Conference football standings
	Conf.					Overall
Team	W		L		T	W		L		T
No. 4 Indiana +	6	–	1	–	0	9	–	2	–	0
Minnesota +	6	–	1	–	0	8	–	2	–	0
No. 9 Purdue +	6	–	1	–	0	8	–	2	–	0
Ohio State	5	–	2	–	0	6	–	3	–	0
Illinois	3	–	4	–	0	4	–	6	–	0
Michigan	3	–	4	–	0	4	–	6	–	0
Michigan State	3	–	4	–	0	3	–	7	–	0
Northwestern	2	–	5	–	0	3	–	7	–	0
Iowa	0	–	6	–	1	1	–	8	–	1
Wisconsin	0	–	6	–	1	0	–	9	–	1
+ – Conference co-champions; Rankings from AP Poll

The 1967 Illinois Fighting Illini football team was an American football team that represented the University of Illinois as a member of the Big Ten Conference during the 1967 Big Ten season. In their first year under head coach Jim Valek, the Fighting Illini compiled a 4–6 record (3–4 in conference games), finished in a tie for fifth place in the Big Ten, and were outscored by a total of 213 to 143.

The team's statistical leaders included quarterback Dean Volkman (1,005 passing yards, 42.1% completion percentage), running back Rich Johnson (768 rushing yards, 3.9 yards per carry), and wide receiver John Wright (52 receptions for 698 yards). Wright was selected as the team's most valuable player. Wright and defensive back Ron Bess received first-team honors on the 1967 All-Big Ten Conference football team.

The team played its home games at Memorial Stadium in Champaign, Illinois.

== Schedule ==
Date	Opponent	Site	Result	Attendance	Source
September 23	at Florida*	Florida Field; Gainesville, FL	L 0–14	57,391	
September 30	Pittsburgh*	Memorial Stadium; Champaign, IL	W 34–6	51,251	
October 7	Indiana	Memorial Stadium; Champaign, IL (rivalry)	L 7–20	53,550	
October 14	Minnesota	Memorial Stadium; Champaign, IL	L 7–10	56,103	
October 21	Notre Dame*	Memorial Stadium; Champaign, IL	L 7–47	71,227	
October 28	at Ohio State	Ohio Stadium; Columbus, OH (Illibuck)	W 17–13	83,928	
November 4	No. 6 Purdue	Memorial Stadium; Champaign, IL (rivalry)	L 9–42	61,262	
November 11	Michigan	Memorial Stadium; Champaign, IL (rivalry)	L 14–21	44,236	
November 18	at Northwestern	Dyche Stadium; Evanston, IL (rivalry)	W 27–21	36,679	
November 25	at Iowa	Iowa Stadium; Iowa City, IA	W 21–19	35,714	
*Non-conference game; Rankings from AP Poll released prior to the game

This was the first season since 1952 in which Illinois faced Iowa, following the chaos of their last matchup.
