= 1967 Minnesota Golden Gophers football team =

American college football season

1967 Minnesota Golden Gophers football

Big Ten co-champion
- Conference: Big Ten Conference

Ranking
- Coaches: No. 14
- Record: 8–2 (6–1 Big Ten)
- Head coach: Murray Warmath (14th season)
- MVP: Tom Sakal
- Captain: Tom Sakal
- Home stadium: Memorial Stadium

1967 Big Ten Conference football standings
	Conf.					Overall
Team	W		L		T	W		L		T
No. 4 Indiana +	6	–	1	–	0	9	–	2	–	0
Minnesota +	6	–	1	–	0	8	–	2	–	0
No. 9 Purdue +	6	–	1	–	0	8	–	2	–	0
Ohio State	5	–	2	–	0	6	–	3	–	0
Illinois	3	–	4	–	0	4	–	6	–	0
Michigan	3	–	4	–	0	4	–	6	–	0
Michigan State	3	–	4	–	0	3	–	7	–	0
Northwestern	2	–	5	–	0	3	–	7	–	0
Iowa	0	–	6	–	1	1	–	8	–	1
Wisconsin	0	–	6	–	1	0	–	9	–	1
+ – Conference co-champions; Rankings from AP Poll

The 1967 Minnesota Golden Gophers football team represented the University of Minnesota in the 1967 Big Ten Conference football season. In their 14th year under head coach Murray Warmath, the Golden Gophers compiled an 8–2 record and outscored their opponents by a combined total of 163 to 106. The Gophers shared the Big Ten title, the most recent conference title for the University of Minnesota football team.

The Gophers did not receive the conference's bid to the Rose Bowl despite their 33-7 victory vs. Indiana. Minnesota, Indiana and Purdue finished in a three-way tie for first place, and each went 1-1 against the other two. The Boilermakers were ineligible since they played in Pasadena the previous year. This invoked the next tiebreaker, which favored the team which had gone the longest since its most recent Rose Bowl trip. Indiana had never been, while Minnesota last appeared in 1962.

Back Tom Sakal received the team's Most Valuable Player award. End Bob Stein was named an All-American by the Walter Camp Football Foundation, Associated Press, United Press International and Football Writers Association of America. Tackle John Williams, end Bob Stein, tackle McKinley Boston and back Tom Sakal were named All-Big Ten first team. Tight end Charles Sanders and offensive guard Ed Duren were named All-Big Ten second team. Offensive lineman Ezell Jones, defensive lineman Ron Kamzelski, defensive lineman Dave Nixon and defensive lineman Bob Stein were named Academic All-Big Ten.

Total attendance at six home games was 287,798, an average of 47,966 per game. The largest crowd was against Michigan State.

== Schedule ==
Date	Opponent	Site	Result	Attendance	Source
September 23	Utah*	Memorial Stadium; Minneapolis, MN	W 13–12	45,963	
September 30	at No. 7 Nebraska*	Memorial Stadium; Lincoln, NE (rivalry)	L 0–7	65,361	
October 7	SMU*	Memorial Stadium; Minneapolis, MN	W 23–3	41,840	
October 14	at Illinois	Memorial Stadium; Champaign, IL	W 10–7	56,103	
October 21	Michigan State^{†}	Memorial Stadium; Minneapolis, MN	W 21–0	56,554	
October 28	Michigan	Memorial Stadium; Minneapolis, MN (Little Brown Jug)	W 20–15	50,006	
November 4	at Iowa	Iowa Stadium; Iowa City, IA (rivalry)	W 10–0	54,731	
November 11	at No. 5 Purdue	Ross–Ade Stadium; West Lafayette, IN	L 12–47	55,647	
November 18	No. 5 Indiana	Memorial Stadium; Minneapolis, MN	W 33–7	50,019	
November 25	Wisconsin	Memorial Stadium; Minneapolis, MN (rivalry)	W 21–14	47,133	
*Non-conference game; ^{†}Homecoming; Rankings from AP Poll released prior to the game

== Season summary ==
=== Indiana ===
External videos
- 1967 Indiana at Minnesota – game film (no sound)
