= Dwight Lee =

American football player (1945–2016)

No. 31, 49
- Position: Running back

Personal information
- Born: September 3, 1945; Mount Clemens, Michigan, U.S.
- Died: December 29, 2016 (aged 71); Eugene, Oregon, U.S.
- Listed height: 6 ft 2 in (1.88 m)
- Listed weight: 190 lb (86 kg)

Career information
- High school: New Haven (New Haven, Michigan)
- College: Michigan State (1964-1967)
- NFL draft: 1968: 5th round, 125th overall pick

Career history
- San Francisco 49ers (1968); Atlanta Falcons (1968); Montreal Alouettes (1969)

Career NFL statistics
- Rushing yards: 7
- Rushing average: 1.2
- Return yards: 63
- Stats at Pro Football Reference

Dwight Lee (September 3, 1945 – December 29, 2016) was an American professional football running back. He played for the San Francisco 49ers and Atlanta Falcons in 1968 and the Montreal Alouettes in 1969.

He died of liver cancer on December 29, 2016, in Eugene, Oregon at age 71.
