= 1967 Indiana Hoosiers football team =

American college football season

1967 Indiana Hoosiers football
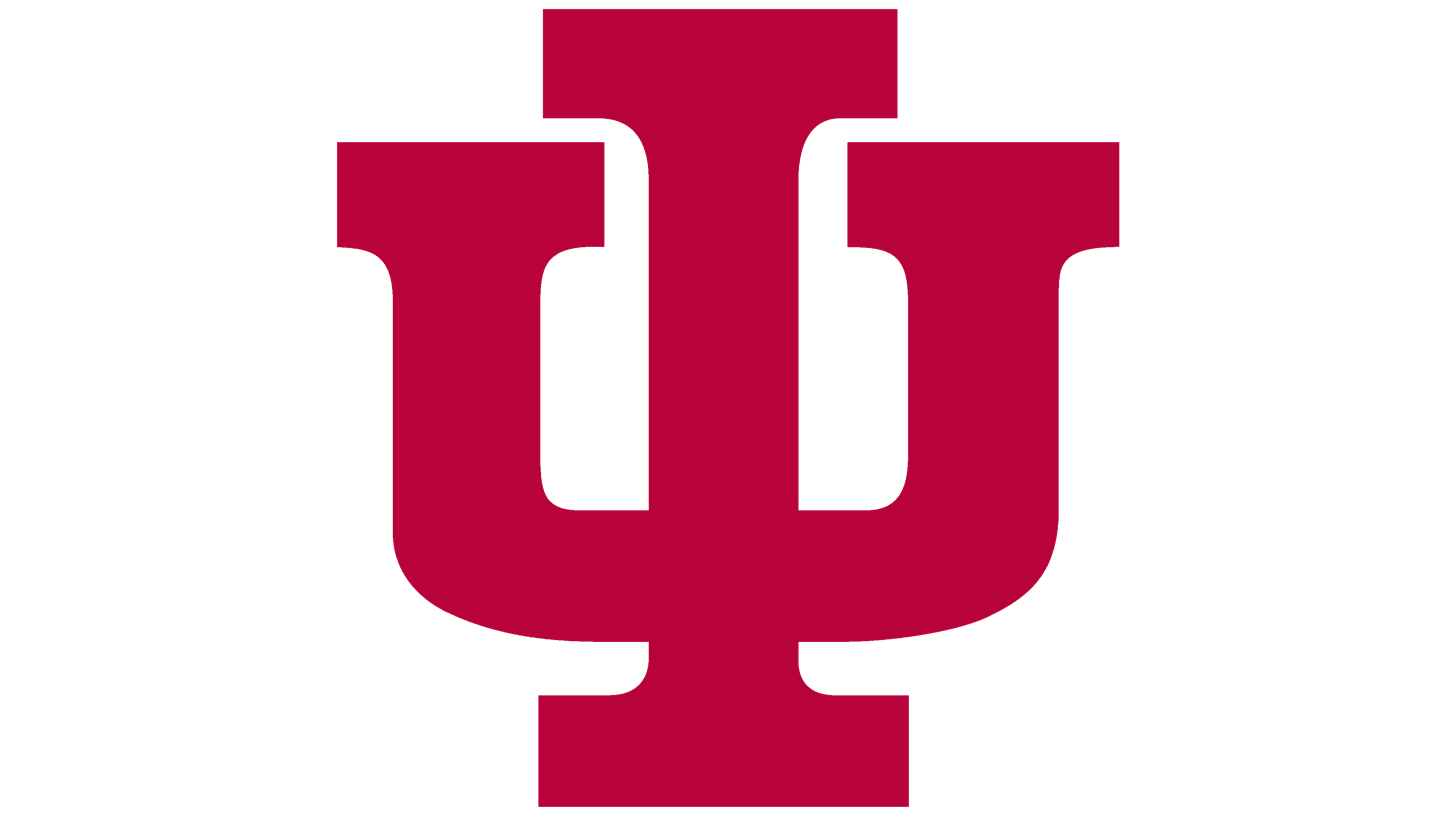

Big Ten co-champion

Rose Bowl, L 3–14 vs. USC
- Conference: Big Ten Conference

Ranking
- Coaches: No. 6
- AP: No. 4
- Record: 9–2 (6–1 Big Ten)
- Head coach: John Pont (3rd season)
- MVP: Harry Gonso
- Captain: Doug Crusan
- Home stadium: Seventeenth Street Stadium

1967 Big Ten Conference football standings
	Conf.					Overall
Team	W		L		T	W		L		T
No. 4 Indiana +	6	–	1	–	0	9	–	2	–	0
Minnesota +	6	–	1	–	0	8	–	2	–	0
No. 9 Purdue +	6	–	1	–	0	8	–	2	–	0
Ohio State	5	–	2	–	0	6	–	3	–	0
Illinois	3	–	4	–	0	4	–	6	–	0
Michigan	3	–	4	–	0	4	–	6	–	0
Michigan State	3	–	4	–	0	3	–	7	–	0
Northwestern	2	–	5	–	0	3	–	7	–	0
Iowa	0	–	6	–	1	1	–	8	–	1
Wisconsin	0	–	6	–	1	0	–	9	–	1
+ – Conference co-champions; Rankings from AP Poll

The 1967 Indiana Hoosiers football team represented Indiana University in the 1967 Big Ten Conference football season. They participated as members of the Big Ten Conference. The Hoosiers played their home games at Seventeenth Street Stadium in Bloomington, Indiana. The team was coached by John Pont, in his third year as head coach of the Hoosiers. They were the last Indiana team to win the Big Ten Conference until 2025, and the last non Michigan or Ohio State team to win the league title (and consequently represent the conference in the Rose Bowl) until the 1981 Iowa Hawkeyes football team won the conference crown. This was Indiana's last conference title until 2025.

In the battle for the Old Oaken Bucket, Indiana beat Purdue.

== Schedule ==
Date	Time	Opponent	Rank	Site	TV	Result	Attendance	Source
September 23	1:30 p.m.	Kentucky*		Seventeenth Street Stadium; Bloomington, IN (rivalry)		W 12–10	42,311	
September 30	1:30 p.m.	Kansas*		Seventeenth Street Stadium; Bloomington, IN		W 18–15	34,861	
October 7	1:30 p.m.	at Illinois		Memorial Stadium; Champaign, IL (rivalry)		W 20–7	53,550	
October 14	1:30 p.m.	Iowa		Seventeenth Street Stadium; Bloomington, IN		W 21–17	41,353	
October 21	12:30 p.m.	at Michigan		Michigan Stadium; Ann Arbor, MI		W 27–20	65,759	
October 28	9:00 p.m.	at Arizona*	No. 10	Arizona Stadium; Tucson, AZ		W 42–7	33,500	
November 4	1:30 p.m.	Wisconsin^{†}	No. 7	Seventeenth Street Stadium; Bloomington, IN		W 14–9	46,910	
November 11	1:30 p.m.	at Michigan State	No. 6	Spartan Stadium; East Lansing, MI (rivalry)		W 14–13	71,023	
November 18	2:30 p.m.	at Minnesota	No. 5	Memorial Stadium; Minneapolis, MN		L 7–33	50,019	
November 25	1:30 p.m.	No. 3 Purdue		Seventeenth Street Stadium; Bloomington, IN (Old Oaken Bucket)		W 19–14	52,770	
January 1	5:00 p.m.	vs. No. 1 USC*	No. 4	Rose Bowl; Pasadena, CA (Rose Bowl)	NBC	L 3–14	102,946	
*Non-conference game; ^{†}Homecoming; Rankings from AP Poll released prior to the game; All times are in Eastern time

== Game summaries ==
=== Kentucky ===
Kentucky at Indiana – Game summary

Quarter	1	2	3	4	Total
Kentucky	7	3	0	0	10
Indiana	0	0	6	6	12

at Seventeenth Street Stadium • Bloomington, IN

- Date: September 23, 1967
- Game time: 1:30 p.m. EST
- Game attendance: 42,311

Statistics	UK	IU
First downs		
Plays–yards		
Rushes–yards		
Passing yards		
Passing: comp–att–int		
Time of possession		

Team	Category	Player	Statistics
UK	Passing		
UK	Rushing		
UK	Receiving		
IU	Passing		
IU	Rushing		
IU	Receiving		

Scoring summary

Quarter	Time	Drive			Team	Scoring information	Score	
Quarter	Time	Plays	Yards	TOP	Team	Scoring information	UK	IU
"TOP" = time of possession. For other American football terms, see Glossary of American football.							10	12

=== Kansas ===
Kansas at Indiana – Game summary

Quarter	1	2	3	4	Total
Kansas	8	0	7	0	15
Indiana	0	8	7	3	18

at Seventeenth Street Stadium • Bloomington, IN

- Date: September 30, 1967
- Game time: 1:30 p.m. EST
- Game attendance: 34,861

Statistics	KU	IU
First downs		
Plays–yards		
Rushes–yards		
Passing yards		
Passing: comp–att–int		
Time of possession		

Team	Category	Player	Statistics
KU	Passing		
KU	Rushing		
KU	Receiving		
IU	Passing		
IU	Rushing		
IU	Receiving		

Scoring summary

Quarter	Time	Drive			Team	Scoring information	Score	
Quarter	Time	Plays	Yards	TOP	Team	Scoring information	KU	IU
"TOP" = time of possession. For other American football terms, see Glossary of American football.							15	18

=== At Illinois ===
Indiana at Illinois – Game summary

Quarter	1	2	3	4	Total
Indiana	7	6	0	7	20
Illinois	0	0	0	7	7

at Memorial Stadium • Champaign, IL

- Date: October 7, 1967
- Game time: 1:30 p.m. EST
- Game attendance: 53,550

Statistics	IU	ILL
First downs		
Plays–yards		
Rushes–yards		
Passing yards		
Passing: comp–att–int		
Time of possession		

Team	Category	Player	Statistics
IU	Passing		
IU	Rushing		
IU	Receiving		
ILL	Passing		
ILL	Rushing		
ILL	Receiving		

Scoring summary

Quarter	Time	Drive			Team	Scoring information	Score	
Quarter	Time	Plays	Yards	TOP	Team	Scoring information	IU	ILL
"TOP" = time of possession. For other American football terms, see Glossary of American football.							20	7

=== Iowa ===
Iowa at Indiana – Game summary

Quarter	1	2	3	4	Total
Iowa	3	0	7	7	17
Indiana	7	7	0	7	21

at Seventeenth Street Stadium • Bloomington, IN

- Date: October 14, 1967
- Game time: 1:30 p.m. EST
- Game attendance: 41,353

Statistics	IOWA	IU
First downs		
Plays–yards		
Rushes–yards		
Passing yards		
Passing: comp–att–int		
Time of possession		

Team	Category	Player	Statistics
IOWA	Passing		
IOWA	Rushing		
IOWA	Receiving		
IU	Passing		
IU	Rushing		
IU	Receiving		

Scoring summary

Quarter	Time	Drive			Team	Scoring information	Score	
Quarter	Time	Plays	Yards	TOP	Team	Scoring information	IOWA	IU
"TOP" = time of possession. For other American football terms, see Glossary of American football.							17	21

=== At Michigan ===
Indiana at Michigan – Game summary

Quarter	1	2	3	4	Total
Indiana	14	6	0	7	27
Michigan	0	7	7	6	20

at Michigan Stadium • Ann Arbor, MI

- Date: October 21, 1967
- Game time: 12:30 p.m. EST
- Game attendance: 65,759

Statistics	IU	MICH
First downs		
Plays–yards		
Rushes–yards		
Passing yards		
Passing: comp–att–int		
Time of possession		

Team	Category	Player	Statistics
IU	Passing		
IU	Rushing		
IU	Receiving		
MICH	Passing		
MICH	Rushing		
MICH	Receiving		

Scoring summary

Quarter	Time	Drive			Team	Scoring information	Score	
Quarter	Time	Plays	Yards	TOP	Team	Scoring information	IU	MICH
"TOP" = time of possession. For other American football terms, see Glossary of American football.							27	20

=== At Arizona ===
No. 10 Indiana at Arizona – Game summary

Quarter	1	2	3	4	Total
No. 10 Indiana	13	6	16	7	42
Arizona	0	7	0	0	7

at Arizona Stadium • Tucson, AZ

- Date: October 28, 1967
- Game time: 9:00 p.m. EST
- Game attendance: 33,500

Statistics	IU	ARIZ
First downs		
Plays–yards		
Rushes–yards		
Passing yards		
Passing: comp–att–int		
Time of possession		

Team	Category	Player	Statistics
IU	Passing		
IU	Rushing		
IU	Receiving		
ARIZ	Passing		
ARIZ	Rushing		
ARIZ	Receiving		

Scoring summary

Quarter	Time	Drive			Team	Scoring information	Score	
Quarter	Time	Plays	Yards	TOP	Team	Scoring information	IU	ARIZ
"TOP" = time of possession. For other American football terms, see Glossary of American football.							42	7

=== Wisconsin ===
Wisconsin at No. 7 Indiana – Game summary

Quarter	1	2	3	4	Total
Wisconsin	0	3	0	6	9
No. 7 Indiana	7	0	7	0	14

at Seventeenth Street Stadium • Bloomington, IN

- Date: November 4, 1967
- Game time: 1:30 p.m. EST
- Game attendance: 46,910

Statistics	WIS	IU
First downs		
Plays–yards		
Rushes–yards		
Passing yards		
Passing: comp–att–int		
Time of possession		

Team	Category	Player	Statistics
WIS	Passing		
WIS	Rushing		
WIS	Receiving		
IU	Passing		
IU	Rushing		
IU	Receiving		

Scoring summary

Quarter	Time	Drive			Team	Scoring information	Score	
Quarter	Time	Plays	Yards	TOP	Team	Scoring information	WIS	IU
"TOP" = time of possession. For other American football terms, see Glossary of American football.							9	14

=== At Michigan State ===
No. 6 Indiana at Michigan State – Game summary

Quarter	1	2	3	4	Total
No. 6 Indiana	0	0	7	7	14
Michigan State	0	3	10	0	13

at Spartan Stadium • East Lansing, MI

- Date: November 11, 1967
- Game time: 1:30 p.m. EST
- Game attendance: 71,023

Statistics	IU	MSU
First downs		
Plays–yards		
Rushes–yards		
Passing yards		
Passing: comp–att–int		
Time of possession		

Team	Category	Player	Statistics
IU	Passing		
IU	Rushing		
IU	Receiving		
MSU	Passing		
MSU	Rushing		
MSU	Receiving		

Scoring summary

Quarter	Time	Drive			Team	Scoring information	Score	
Quarter	Time	Plays	Yards	TOP	Team	Scoring information	IU	MSU
"TOP" = time of possession. For other American football terms, see Glossary of American football.							14	13

=== At Minnesota ===
No. 5 Indiana at Minnesota – Game summary

Quarter	1	2	3	4	Total
No. 5 Indiana	0	0	7	0	7
Minnesota	0	7	6	20	33

at Memorial Stadium • Minneapolis, MN

- Date: November 18, 1967
- Game time: 2:30 p.m. EST
- Game attendance: 50,019

External videos
- 1967 Indiana at Minnesota – game film (no sound)

Statistics	IU	MINN
First downs		
Plays–yards		
Rushes–yards		
Passing yards		
Passing: comp–att–int		
Time of possession		

Team	Category	Player	Statistics
IU	Passing		
IU	Rushing		
IU	Receiving		
MINN	Passing		
MINN	Rushing		
MINN	Receiving		

Scoring summary

Quarter	Time	Drive			Team	Scoring information	Score	
Quarter	Time	Plays	Yards	TOP	Team	Scoring information	IU	MINN
"TOP" = time of possession. For other American football terms, see Glossary of American football.							7	33

=== No. 3 Purdue ===
No. 3 Purdue at Indiana – Game summary

Quarter	1	2	3	4	Total
No. 3 Purdue	7	0	7	0	14
Indiana	7	12	0	0	19

at Seventeenth Street Stadium • Bloomington, IN

- Date: November 25, 1967
- Game time: 1:30 p.m. EST
- Game attendance: 52,770

Statistics	PUR	IU
First downs		
Plays–yards		
Rushes–yards		
Passing yards		
Passing: comp–att–int		
Time of possession		

Team	Category	Player	Statistics
PUR	Passing		
PUR	Rushing		
PUR	Receiving		
IU	Passing		
IU	Rushing		
IU	Receiving		

Scoring summary

Quarter	Time	Drive			Team	Scoring information	Score	
Quarter	Time	Plays	Yards	TOP	Team	Scoring information	PUR	IU
1					IU	Butcher 7-yard touchdown reception from Ganso, Kornowa kick good	0	7
1					PUR	Williams 9-yard touchdown run, Baltzell kick good	7	7
2					IU	Krivosha 2-yard touchdown run, Kornowa kick no good	7	13
2					IU	Cole 63-yard touchdown run, kick good/no good	7	19
3					PUR	Williams 2-yard touchdown run, Baltzell kick good	14	19
"TOP" = time of possession. For other American football terms, see Glossary of American football.							14	19

Indiana was voted to the Rose Bowl a few hours after the win.

=== USC (Rose Bowl) ===
Rose Bowl: No. 1 USC vs No. 4 Indiana – Game summary

Quarter	1	2	3	4	Total
No. 1 USC	7	0	7	0	14
No. 4 Indiana	0	3	0	0	3

at Rose Bowl • Pasadena, CA

- Date: January 1, 1968
- Game time: 5:00 p.m. EST
- Game attendance: 102,996

Statistics	USC	IU
First downs		
Plays–yards		
Rushes–yards		
Passing yards		
Passing: comp–att–int		
Time of possession		

Team	Category	Player	Statistics
USC	Passing		
USC	Rushing		
USC	Receiving		
IU	Passing		
IU	Rushing		
IU	Receiving		

Scoring summary

Quarter	Time	Drive			Team	Scoring information	Score	
Quarter	Time	Plays	Yards	TOP	Team	Scoring information	USC	IU
1					USC	Simpson 2-yard touchdown run, Aldridge kick good	7	0
2					IU	27-yard field goal by Kornowa	7	3
3					USC	Simpson 8-yard touchdown run, Aldridge kick good	14	3
"TOP" = time of possession. For other American football terms, see Glossary of American football.							14	3

== Personnel ==
16 Harry Gonso; 17 John Isenbarger; 18 Mike Perry; 20 Jay Mathias; 21 Benny Norman; 21 Gary Nichols; 22 Nate Cunningham; 23 Dave Kornowa; 24 Bob Douglas; 26 Dave Evans; 27 Jan Hatch 31 Bill Huff; 32 Bob Nichols; 33 Mike Baughman; 35 Mike Krivoshia; 37 Kevin Duffy; 38 Bob Moynihan; 39 Lee Robinson; 40 Jade Butcher; 42 Don Warner; 44 Roger Grove; 45 Mike Adams; 47 Mike Deal; 48 Terry Cole; 49 Cal Wilson; 50 Mike Roth; 51 Harold Mauro; 52 Ken Kaczmarek; 53 Steve Applegate; 54 Karl Pankratz; 55 Cordell Gill; 57 Dan Bueter; 58 Ted Verlihay; 60 Jerry Grecco; 61 Cal Snowden; 62 E.G. White; 63 Don DeSalle; 64 Bob Russell; 68 Gary Cassells; 70 Bill Bergman; 72 Bob Kirk; 74 Al Schmidt; 75 Doug Rhodus; 76 Ed Harrison; 78 Doug Crusan; 79 Rick Spickard; 80 Tom Bilunas; 81 Al Gage; 83 Jim Sniadecki; 84 Brown Marks; 86 Bill McCaa; 87 Al Kamradt; 89 Eric Stolberg; 91 Ron Easterley; 96 Clarence Price; 97 Bill Wolfe; Greg Thaxton; Harold Dunn; John Perry;

== Awards and honors ==
- John Pont: Eddie Robinson Coach of the Year Award, Paul "Bear" Bryant Award, Walter Camp Coach of the Year

== 1968 NFL draftees ==
Player	Position	Round	Pick	NFL club
Doug Crusan	Tackle	1	27	Miami Dolphins
Terry Cole	Running back	9	242	Baltimore Colts
Brown Marks	Linebacker	16	435	Cincinnati Bengals
