= Dennis Brown (quarterback) =

American football player and coach

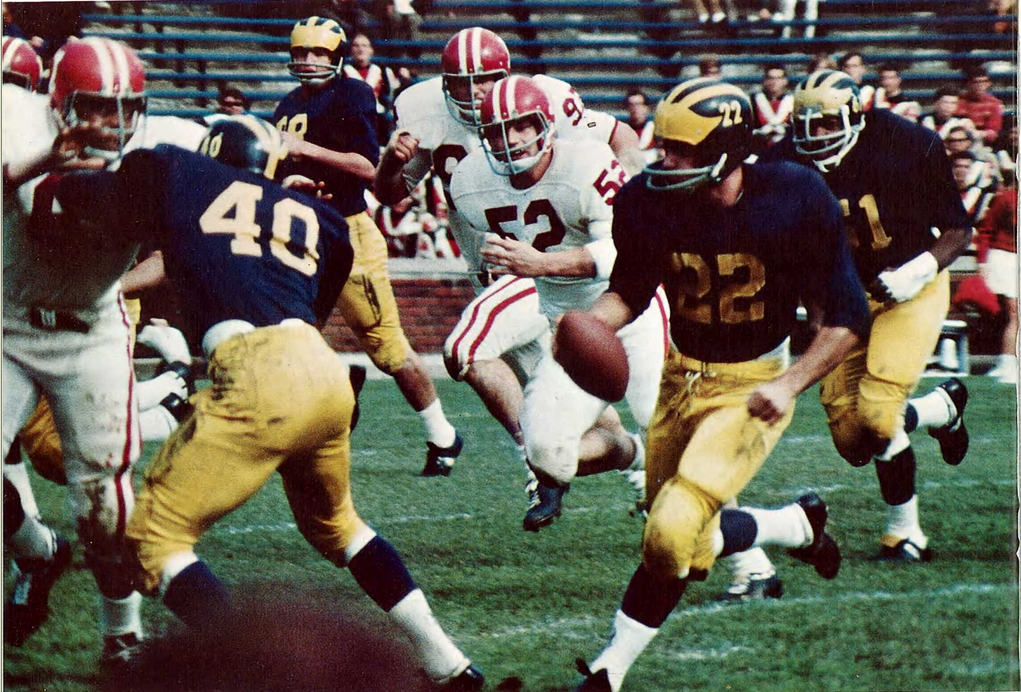
- Brown (No. 22) from 1968 Michiganensian

Biographical details
- Born: c. 1948

Playing career
- 1966–1968: Michigan
- Position: Quarterback

Coaching career (HC unless noted)
- 1971: Dartmouth (freshman coach)
- 1972–1979: Michigan (assistant)
- 1980–1986: West Virginia (def. coordinator)
- 1987–1988: Arizona State (def. coordinator)

Accomplishments and honors

Awards
- First-team All-Big Ten (1968)

Dennis M. Brown is an American former football player and coach. He played at the quarterback position for the University of Michigan from 1966 to 1968, the final three years of Bump Elliott's tenure as the school's head football coach. In his first start at quarterback, Brown broke two Big Ten Conference single-game records with 338 yards of total offense and 61 plays. At the end of his playing career at Michigan, he held most of the school's career passing records, including passing yards (2,534), pass attempts (388), and touchdown passes (20). He later served as an assistant football coach at Michigan (1972–1979), West Virginia University (1980–1987), and Arizona State University (1988–1990).

== Early years ==
Brown grew up in Lincoln Park, Michigan. He attended Lincoln Park High School, where he was an all-state football player and also served as co-captain of the basketball and baseball teams. In 1964, the Detroit Free Press chose Brown to be honored as part of their All-Suburban football team. They highlighted his accomplishments of gaining 500 yards, and passing for 900 more and 10 touchdowns.

== University of Michigan ==
=== 1966 season ===
Brown enrolled at the University of Michigan in 1965. As a sophomore in 1966, he was a back-up to quarterback Dick Vidmer. His first appearance for Michigan was as a substitute for Vidmer in a 41–0 victory over Oregon State on September 17, 1966. He completed both of his passes, including a touchdown pass to Jim Berline. Brown also saw brief action in a loss to an undefeated Michigan State team (0–1 passing) and against Minnesota (1–1 passing).

=== 1967 season ===
In 1967, Brown started six games at quarterback for a Michigan team that finished the season with a 4–6 record. It was Michigan's last losing season for more than 40 years.

Vidmer began the 1967 season as the starting quarterback, and Michigan won one game and lost three under Vidmer. Brown was brought into the game in the second half against Michigan State. Although the Wolverines lost the game 34–0, Brown's performance was good enough to win him the starting assignment the following week. Teammate George Hoey later recalled, "From an emotional standpoint, I know that when Dennis came in, he was just a spark plug. He had a fiery spirit and that permeated through the team." Vidmer had the stronger throwing arm, but Brown was more mobile.

Brown's first start came against Indiana. Although Michigan lost the game 27–20, Brown established himself as a star. He completed 18 of 31 passes for 211 yards and led the team in rushing with 127 yards and two touchdowns. He also broke two Big Ten Conference records. He accumulated 338 yards of total offense, breaking the single game conference record set by Bob Griese with 317 yards in 1966. He was also involved in 61 plays to surpass the conference record set by Paul Giel with 53 plays in 1953.

Three weeks later against Wisconsin, Brown completed 12 of 17 passes for 232 yards. He threw touchdown passes of 60 yards to Jim Berline and 31 yards to Ron Johnson and scrambled 44 yards for a rushing touchdown. He totaled 274 yards of total offense before leaving the game in the fourth quarter after he had the wind knocked out of him by a Wisconsin tackler.

In the final game of the 1967 season against Ohio State, Brown was 17 for 24 passing for 179 yards and two touchdowns. In the closing minutes of the first half, Brown led the Wolverines on an 80-yard drive, capped by a six-yard touchdown pass to Jim Berline. The second score came on a 47-yard drive in the fourth quarter, ending with a 13-yard touchdown pass to John Gabler. Brown's two touchdown passes were not enough as Michigan was limited to 128 rushing yards and lost to the Buckeyes, 24–14.

In the final six games of the season, with Brown as the starting quarterback, Michigan improved to 3–3. During the 1967 season, Brown completed 82 of 155 pass attempts for 928 yards and seven touchdowns. Despite starting only six games, Brown set a new Big Ten season record for most offensive plays with 290, breaking the prior record of 276 plays by Gary Snook in 1964.

=== 1968 season ===
As a senior, Brown was the starting quarterback in 9 of 10 games for the 1968 team that finished 8–2 in Bump Elliott's last year as head coach.

In mid-October, Brown led Michigan to a come-from-behind win over Michigan State. One sports writer opened his game coverage as follows:

"Bundle up when you go out in the cold, Dennis Brown. Wear your galoshes and that maize and blue muffler. And please don't slip in the shower or slam a finger in a car door. Michigan needs you, Dennis Brown. You were charmed Saturday when you brought your Wolverines from behind in the fourth quarter to hand Michigan State its first loss, 28–14."

After Brown led Michigan to a 33–20 win over Minnesota with 152 passing yards and passing touchdowns to Billy Harris and Paul Staroba, the Golden Gophers' head coach Murray Warmath said: "Brown was the big player. He was a genius on the field. I've never seen a better game from a quarterback. This is what chopped us up. His quick passes were tremendous. [Ron] Johnson's a great back and he runs real well, but Brown was the big man today."

Two weeks later, Brown had his best game of the 1968 season against Illinois. He led Michigan to a 36-0 win, completing 13 of 27 passes for 226 yards and throwing touchdown passes of 69 yards to Billy Harris and 14 yards to Paul Staroba. In that game, Brown added 45 rushing yards for 271 total offensive yards. In the third quarter, he threw a 69-yard touchdown pass to William Harris for Michigan's longest scoring play of the 1968 season. After the score, Brown ran for a two-point conversion.

Brown finished the season with 109 complete passes for 1,562 yards, 12 touchdown passes and 10 interceptions, and ranked as the Big Ten's leader in total offense.

He was selected by the Associated Press as the first-team quarterback on the 1968 All-Big Ten Conference football team, and was also selected to play quarterback in the 1968 East–West Shrine Game and the 1969 Hula Bowl.

=== Career statistics ===
In three years at Michigan, Brown completed 194 of 388 pass attempts for 2,534 yards, 20 touchdowns and 17 interceptions. Brown also rushed for 616 yards and had six rushing touchdowns. At the end of his playing career at Michigan, he held most of the school's career passing records, including passing yards (2,534), pass attempts (388), and touchdown passes (20).

== Coaching career ==
After graduating from Michigan, Brown spent the next two decades as an assistant football coach. He spent the 1970 season as a graduate assistant and then coached the freshman football team at Dartmouth College in 1971.

From 1972 to 1979, Brown was an assistant coach at Michigan under Bo Schembechler. Michigan compiled a record of 76-14 in the eight years that Brown served as an assistant coach.

After the 1979 season, Don Nehlen left Schembechler's staff at Michigan to become the head football coach at West Virginia. In January 1980, Brown joined Nehlen's staff. Brown remained at West Virginia for eight years and was the Mountaineers defensive coordinator when future Michigan head football coach Rich Rodriguez played there from 1981 to 1984. Brown later recalled, "Rich was always a very nice young man. He couldn't have been more cordial. He's just really a great example of what college football should be like."

In January 1988, Brown became the defensive coordinator for the Arizona State Sun Devils. He held that position during the 1988 and 1989 seasons. He was fired in January 1990 after the Sun Devils allowed 258 points in the 1989 season.

In 1995, Brown was hired as the head football coach at East Detroit High School in Eastpointe, Michigan.

== Later years ==
In 2000, Brown became an assistant principal at Annapolis High School in Dearborn Heights, Michigan. He also worked at the University of Detroit Jesuit High School and Academy as a building substitute where he commonly claims "this is not my first rodeo" to students trying to trick him.
