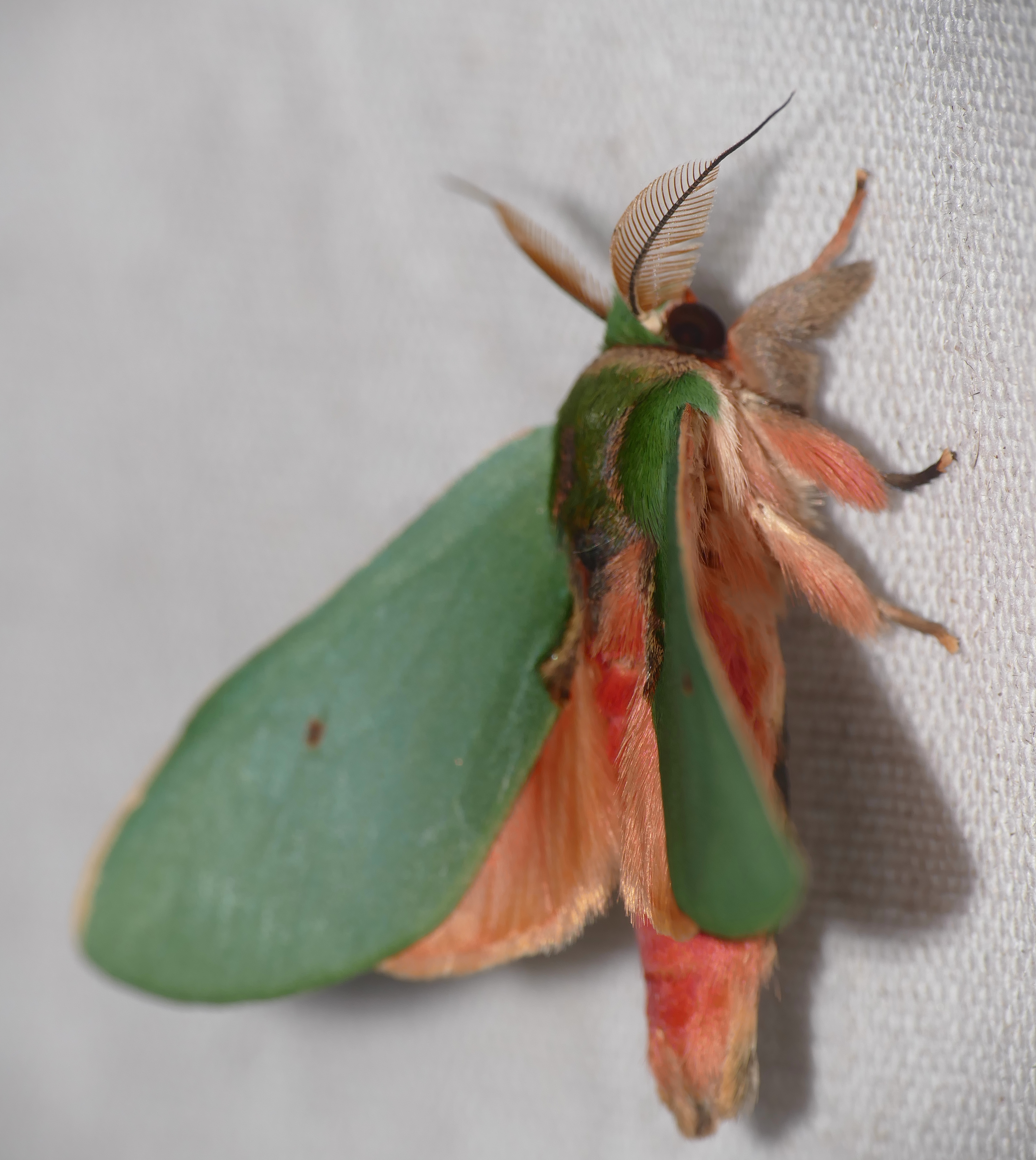
- Rosema myops

Scientific classification
- Kingdom: Animalia
- Phylum: Arthropoda
- Clade: Pancrustacea
- Class: Insecta
- Order: Lepidoptera
- Superfamily: Noctuoidea
- Family: Notodontidae
- Subfamily: Heterocampinae
- Genus: Rosema; Walker, 1855

Synonyms
- Rhogalia Hübner, 1825

= Rosema (moth) =

Genus of moths

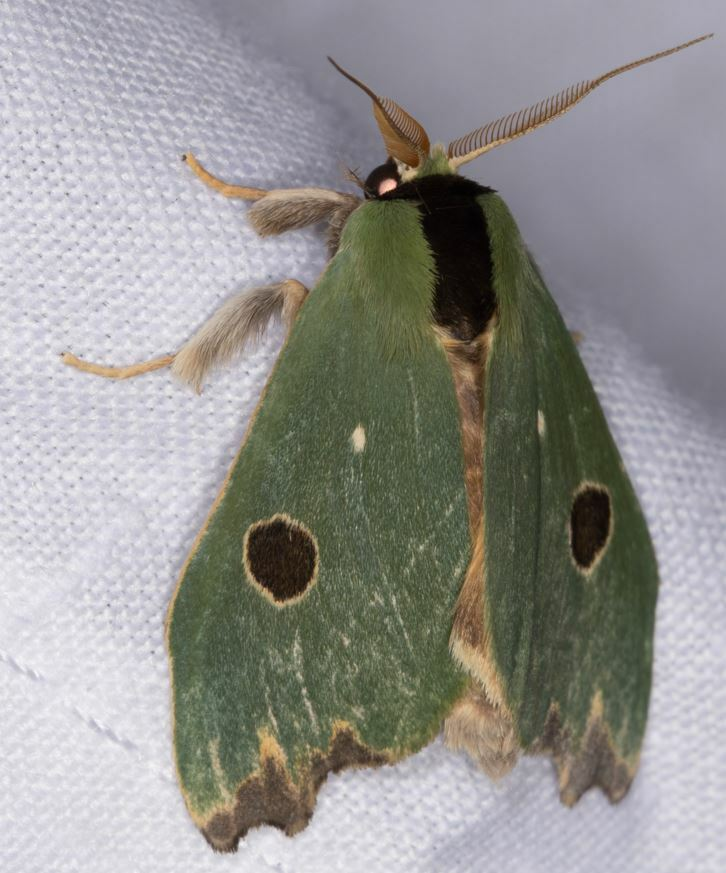
Rosema deolis, Perú

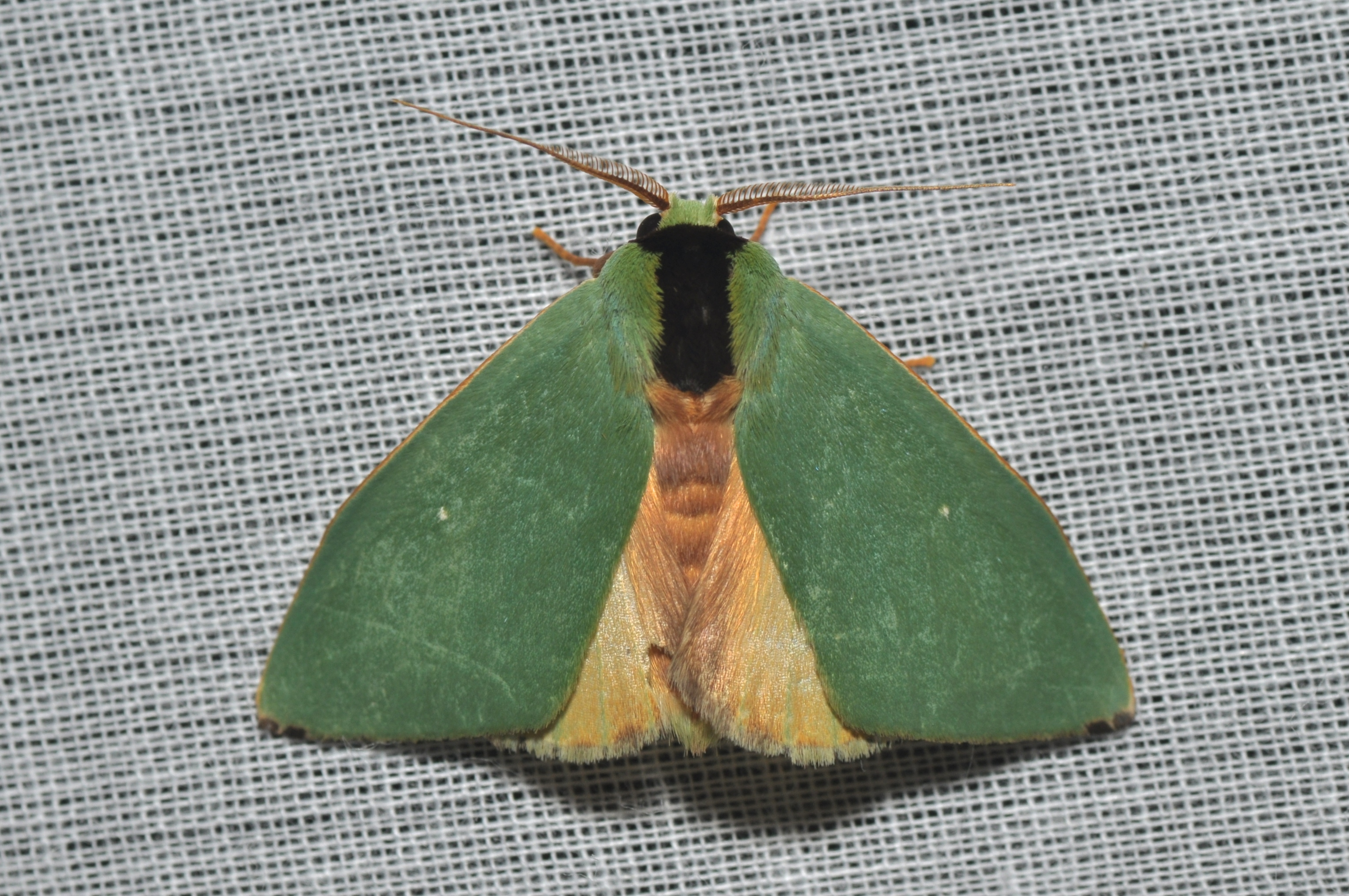
Rosema zelica

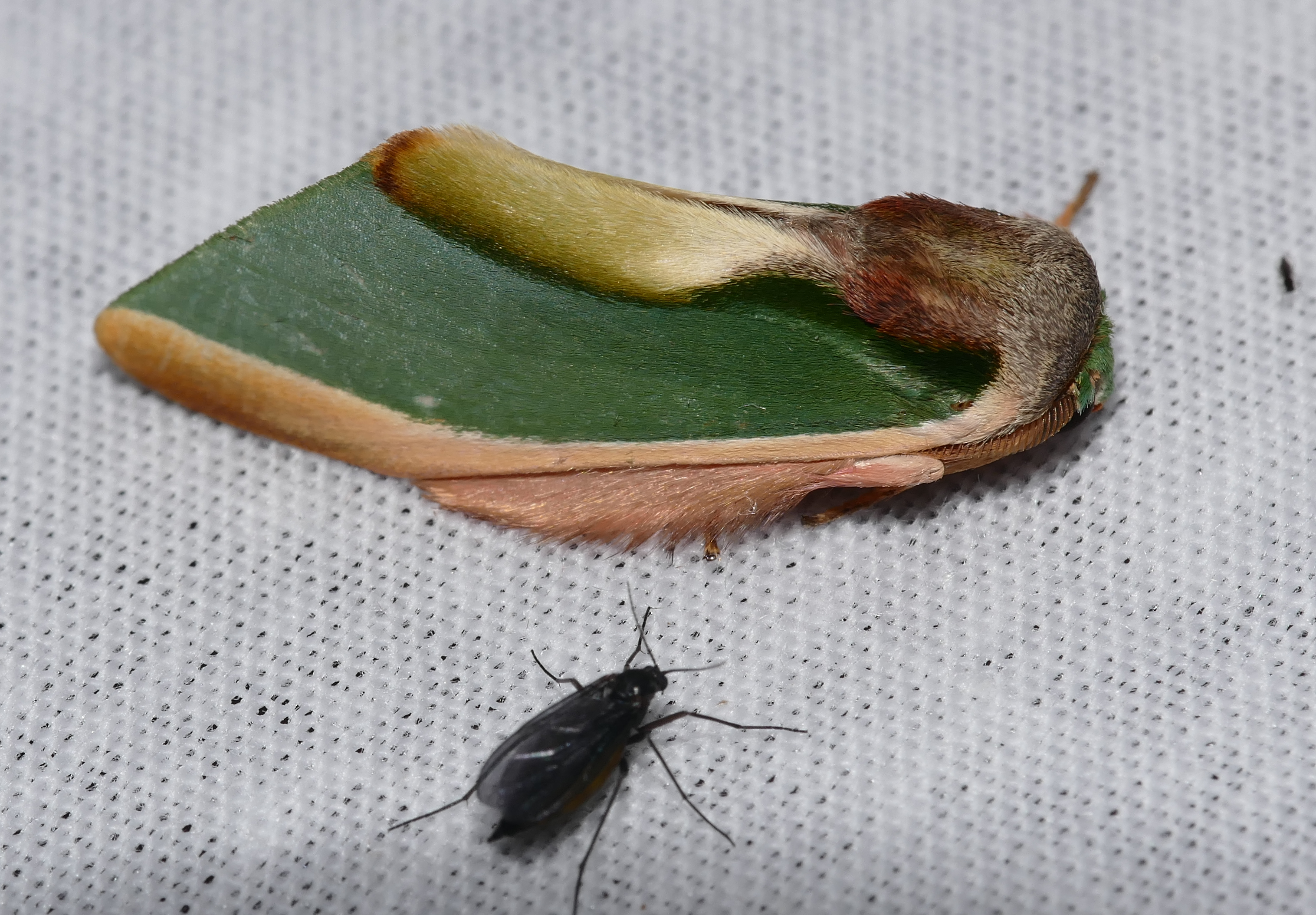
Rosema apollinairei

Rosema is a genus of prominent moths in the family Notodontidae. There are more than 60 described species in Rosema, found in Mexico, Central America, and South America.

== Species ==
These 64 species belong to the genus Rosema:

- Rosema aethra Druce, 1887
- Rosema albiceps Draudt, 1934
- Rosema amazonica Draudt, 1934
- Rosema apicalis Walker, 1855
- Rosema apollinairei Dognin, 1916
- Rosema aragua Thiaucourt, 2019
- Rosema attenuata Thiaucourt, 2015
- Rosema betzi Thiaucourt, 1979
- Rosema boliviana Draudt, 1934
- Rosema boulardi Thiaucourt, 1988
- Rosema brunnescens Dognin, 1923
- Rosema cacaulandia (Schintlmeister, 2019)
- Rosema ceciliae Thiaucourt, 2000
- Rosema costalis Felder, 1874
- Rosema dealbata Dognin, 1901
- Rosema demorsa Felder, 1874
- Rosema dentifera Draudt, 1934
- Rosema deolis (Cramer, 1775)
- Rosema dolorosa Druce, 1901
- Rosema dorsalis Walker, 1855
- Rosema drucei Draudt, 1933
- Rosema epigena Stoll, 1790
- Rosema erdae Schaus, 1933
- Rosema eurytis Druce, 1903
- Rosema excavata Schaus, 1892
- Rosema falcata Schaus, 1906
- Rosema falcatella Gaede, 1934
- Rosema fulvipennis Butler, 1878
- Rosema hieroglyphica Rothschild, 1917
- Rosema inscita Schaus, 1892
- Rosema intermedia Thiaucourt, 2015
- Rosema knispelae Schintlmeister, 2019
- Rosema languida Schaus, 1892
- Rosema magniplaga Schaus, 1906
- Rosema marona Schaus, 1906
- Rosema maximepunctum Thiaucourt, 2015
- Rosema melini Bryk, 1953
- Rosema milleri Schintlmeister, 2019
- Rosema misahualli Thiaucourt, 2015
- Rosema mona D.Jones, 1921
- Rosema myops Felder, 1874
- Rosema nadina Schaus, 1906
- Rosema obliquifascia Rothschild, 1917
- Rosema ocama Schaus, 1939
- Rosema orvoeni Thiaucourt, 1978
- Rosema pallida Jones, 1921
- Rosema pallidicosta Schaus, 1906
- Rosema pertua Schintlmeister, 2019
- Rosema plumbeiplaga Rothschild, 1917
- Rosema purpusi Draudt, 1934
- Rosema quetala Schintlmeister, 2019
- Rosema rotunda Draudt, 1934
- Rosema sciritis Druce, 1890
- Rosema simillima Draudt, 1934
- Rosema simois Druce, 1890
- Rosema tanampaya Draudt, 1934
- Rosema thestia Druce, 1898
- Rosema tinae Thiaucourt, 1979
- Rosema tineae Thiaucourt, 1979
- Rosema unda Schaus, 1892
- Rosema vitula Druce, 1903
- Rosema walkeri Schaus
- Rosema zelica (Stoll, 1790)
- Rosema zikani Draudt, 1934
