= 1967 Purdue Boilermakers football team =

American college football season

1967 Purdue Boilermakers football

Big Ten co-champion
- Conference: Big Ten Conference

Ranking
- Coaches: No. 9
- AP: No. 9
- Record: 8–2 (6–1 Big Ten)
- Head coach: Jack Mollenkopf (12th season)
- MVP: Leroy Keyes
- Captains: Jim Beirne; Bob Sebeck
- Home stadium: Ross–Ade Stadium

1967 Big Ten Conference football standings
	Conf.					Overall
Team	W		L		T	W		L		T
No. 4 Indiana +	6	–	1	–	0	9	–	2	–	0
Minnesota +	6	–	1	–	0	8	–	2	–	0
No. 9 Purdue +	6	–	1	–	0	8	–	2	–	0
Ohio State	5	–	2	–	0	6	–	3	–	0
Illinois	3	–	4	–	0	4	–	6	–	0
Michigan	3	–	4	–	0	4	–	6	–	0
Michigan State	3	–	4	–	0	3	–	7	–	0
Northwestern	2	–	5	–	0	3	–	7	–	0
Iowa	0	–	6	–	1	1	–	8	–	1
Wisconsin	0	–	6	–	1	0	–	9	–	1
+ – Conference co-champions; Rankings from AP Poll

The 1967 Purdue Boilermakers football team was an American football team that represented Purdue University during the 1967 Big Ten Conference football season. In their 12th season under head coach Jack Mollenkopf, the Boilermakers compiled an 8–2 record, finished in a three-way tie for the Big Ten Conference championship with a 6–1 record against conference opponents, and outscored all opponents by a combined total of 291 to 154.

The Boilermakers missed the opportunity to win the conference championship outright by losing the battle for the Old Oaken Bucket to archrival Indiana. Had Purdue won, it would not have gone to the Rose Bowl due to the Big Ten's "no-repeat" rule, which banned teams from making consecutive appearances in Pasadena.

Purdue's junior running back Leroy Keyes rushed for 986 yards in 1967, was selected as a consensus first-team All-American, and was later inducted into the College Football Hall of Fame. Other notable players from the 1967 Purdue team included quarterback Mike Phipps, running back Perry Williams, offensive end Jim Beirne, offensive tackle Chuck Kuzneski, offensive guard Bob Sebeck, middle guard Chuck Kyle, linebacker Dick Marvel, defensive ends George Olion and Bob Holmes, defensive tackle Lance Olssen, and defensive back Tim Foley.

== Schedule ==
Date	Opponent	Rank	Site	Result	Attendance	Source
September 23	vs. Texas A&M*		Cotton Bowl; Dallas, TX	W 24–20	27,500	
September 30	No. 1 Notre Dame*	No. 10	Ross–Ade Stadium; West Lafayette, IN (rivalry)	W 28–21	62,316	
October 7	Northwestern	No. 4	Ross–Ade Stadium; West Lafayette, IN	W 25–16	61,093	
October 14	at Ohio State	No. 2	Ohio Stadium; Columbus, OH	W 41–6	84,069	
October 21	Oregon State*^{†}	No. 2	Ross–Ade Stadium; West Lafayette, IN	L 14–22	60,147	
October 28	at Iowa	No. 7	Iowa Stadium; Iowa City, IA	W 41–22	56,504	
November 4	at Illinois	No. 6	Memorial Stadium; Champaign, IL (rivalry)	W 42–9	61,262	
November 11	Minnesota	No. 5	Ross–Ade Stadium; West Lafayette, IN	W 41–12	55,647	
November 18	Michigan State	No. 3	Ross–Ade Stadium; West Lafayette, IN	W 21–7	61,364	
November 25	at Indiana	No. 3	Seventeenth Street Stadium; Bloomington, IN (Old Oaken Bucket)	L 14–19	52,770	
*Non-conference game; ^{†}Homecoming; Rankings from AP Poll released prior to the game

== Game summaries ==
=== At Iowa ===
- Leroy Keyes 14 rushes, 145 yards

=== At Illinois ===
- Leroy Keyes 21 rushes, 225 yards

=== Michigan State ===
- Leroy Keyes 24 rushes, 193 yards

=== At Indiana ===
Purdue at Indiana

Team	1	2	3	4	Total
No. 3 Boilermakers	7	0	7	0	14
• Hoosiers	7	12	0	0	19

- Date: November 25
- Location: Bloomington, IN

Scoring summary
1	IND	Butcher 7-yard pass from Ganso (Kornowa kick)	IND 7-0
1	PUR	Williams 9-yard run (Baltzell kick)	Tied 7-7
2	IND	Krivosha 2-yard run (kick failed)	IND 13-7
2	IND	Cole 63-yard run (pass failed)	IND 19-7
3	PUR	Williams 2-yard run (Baltzell kick)	IND 19-14

- Perry Williams 24 rushes, 124 yards
- Leroy Keyes 20 rushes, 114 yards

== Roster ==
1967 Purdue Boilermakers football team roster
Players
Coaches
Offense

Pos.	#	Name	Class
QB	10	Don Kiepert	So
QB	15	Mike Phipps	So
QB	16	Jim Klutcharch	So
QB	19	Larry Emch	Jr
HB	23	Leroy Keyes	Jr
HB	25	Jim Kirkpatrick	So
HB, K	34	Bob Baltzell	So
HB	35	Leon Troyer	Jr
HB	41	Bob Hurst	Sr
HB	46	Ed Crowley	So
FB	47	Perry Williams	Jr
OT	49	Lee Ryan	Jr
G	50	David Stydahar	Jr
C	56	Walter Whitehead	So
C	57	Mike Frame	Jr
G	61	Gary Roberts	Jr
G	64	Dave Piper	So
G	65	Bob Sebeck (C)	Sr
G	66	Chuck Kuzneski	Sr
OT, LB	67	Clanton King	Jr
OT	70	Randy Kuntz	So
OT	71	Fred Rafa	Sr
OT, G	72	Bill Yanchar	So
OT	74	Jim Bonk	Jr
OT	76	Fred Haug	Jr
E	81	Jim Beirne (C)	Sr
E	82	Bob Dillingham	Jr
E	83	Marion Griffin	Jr
E	84	Joe Walsh	So
E	88	Billy McKoy	So
G	95	Phil Kelley	So

Defense

Pos.	#	Name	Class
HB	22	Dennis Cirbes	Sr
DE	29	Denny Wirgowski	So
HB	32	Don Webster	So
LB	42	Dick Marvel	Jr
HB	43	Tim Foley	So
HB	45	Bob Corby	Sr
LB	51	Bob Weskamp	So
LB	58	Bob Yunaska	Jr
G	60	Chuck Kyle	Jr
LB	68	Frank Burke	Jr
OT	75	Lance Olssen	Sr
E	87	George Olion	Sr
E	90	Willie Nelson	So
E	91	Dave Heiss	So
E	93	Bob Holmes	So
E	94	Bill Liber	So

Special teams

Pos.	#	Name	Class
P	21	Dick Berg	So

Head coach

- Jack Mollenkopf

Coordinators/assistant coaches

- Bob DeMoss (Assistant)
- Ned Maloney (Assistant)
- Ron Meyer (Assistant)
- George Catavolos (GA)

Legend

- (C) Team captain
- (S) Suspended
- (I) Ineligible
- Injured
- Redshirt
