= Tom Stincic =

American football player (1946–2021)

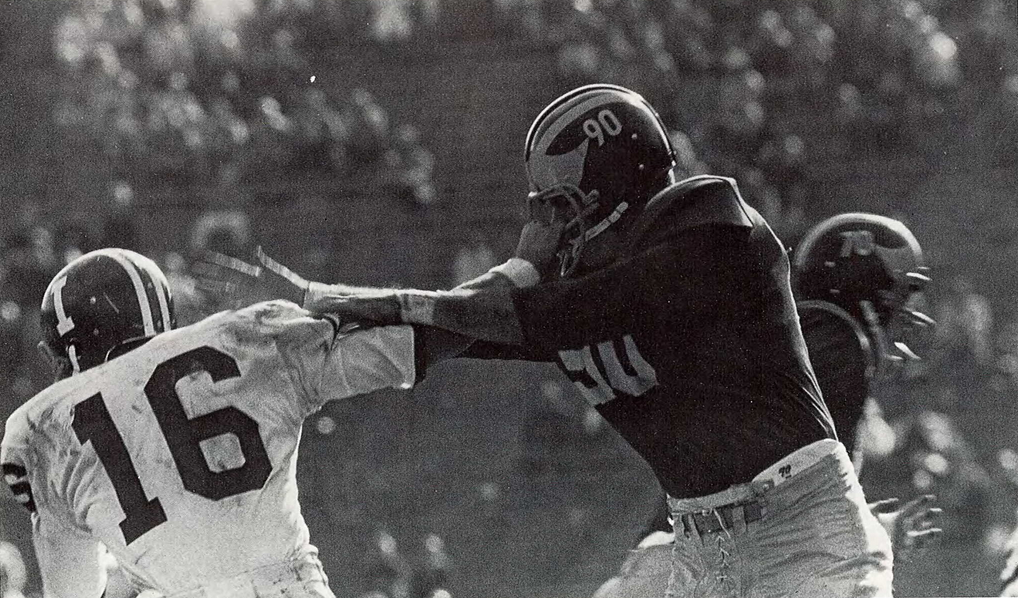

No. 56, 55
- Position: Linebacker

Personal information
- Born: November 24, 1946; Cleveland, Ohio, U.S.
- Died: December 26, 2021 (aged 75)
- Listed height: 6 ft 2 in (1.88 m)
- Listed weight: 229 lb (104 kg)

Career information
- High school: John Marshall (Cleveland)
- College: Michigan (1965-1968)
- NFL draft: 1969: 3rd round, 68th overall pick

Career history
- Dallas Cowboys (1969–1971); New Orleans Saints (1972)

Awards and highlights
- Super Bowl champion (VI); 2× First-team All-Big Ten (1967, 1968)

Career NFL statistics
- Interceptions: 1
- Stats at Pro Football Reference

Thomas Dorn Stincic (November 24, 1946 – December 26, 2021) was an American professional football linebacker in the National Football League (NFL) for the Dallas Cowboys and New Orleans Saints. He played college football, principally as a linebacker, at the University of Michigan from 1966 to 1968.

== Early life ==
A native of Cleveland, Ohio, Stincic attended John Marshall High School.

== College career ==
Stincic enrolled at the University of Michigan in 1965 and played football for the Michigan Wolverines football team from 1966 to 1968. From the start he was recognized for his leadership qualities. As a sophomore in 1966, he saw limited action in four games.

As a junior in 1967, Stincic started two games at defensive end and four games at linebacker. He had a career-high ten tackles against Illinois.

As a senior, he totaled 55 tackles and 47 assists as a starting linebacker for the 1968 Michigan Wolverines football team that compiled an 8–2 record and finished ranked No. 12 in the final AP Poll. He received All-Big Ten honors in both 1967 and 1968.

== Professional football ==
=== Dallas Cowboys ===
Stincic was selected by the Dallas Cowboys in the third round (68th overall pick) of the 1969 NFL/AFL draft. He spent three seasons serving as the backup to middle linebacker Lee Roy Jordan, appearing in 35 games, and playing with the Super Bowl VI championship team.

After three years as a backup in Dallas, he asked to be traded. On July 17, 1972, he was sent to the New Orleans Saints in exchange for a third-round draft choice (#53-Harvey Martin).

=== New Orleans Saints ===
Stincic appeared in seven games, four as a starter, for the Saints during the 1972 season. On March 20, 1973, Stincic was traded to the Houston Oilers along with Dave Parks and Edd Hargett, in exchange for Ron Billingsley and Kent Nix. He decided to retire after not reaching a contract agreement with the Houston Oilers.

== Coaching and teaching career ==
Stincic coached high school football and taught social studies and science at Chaparral High School in Scottsdale, Arizona in the 1980s, including coaching the football team to the state playoffs in 1985. He taught science at Mountain View High School in Mesa, Arizona in the 2000s.

== Death ==
Stincic died on December 26, 2021, at the age of 75.
