= Rocky Rosema =

American football player (1946–2020)

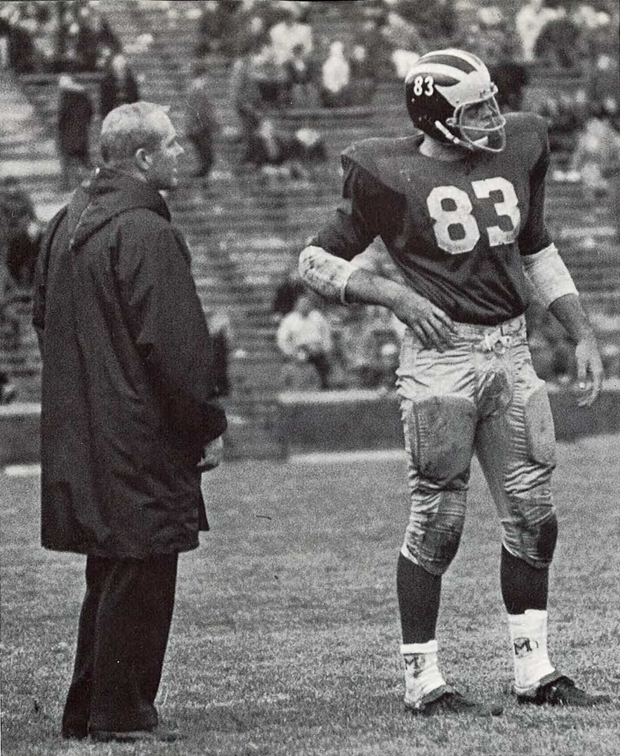
- Coach Bump Elliott and Rosema (No. 83) from 1968 Michiganensian

No. 34
- Position: Linebacker

Personal information
- Born: February 5, 1946; Grand Rapids, Michigan, U.S.
- Died: January 15, 2020 (aged 73); Grand Rapids, Michigan, U.S.
- Listed height: 6 ft 2 in (1.88 m)
- Listed weight: 230 lb (104 kg)

Career information
- High school: Central (Grand Rapids)
- College: Michigan
- NFL draft: 1968: 5th round, 123rd overall pick

Career history
- St. Louis Cardinals (1968–1971)

Career NFL statistics
- Interceptions: 1
- Sacks: 2.5
- Stats at Pro Football Reference

Roger William "Rocky" Rosema (February 5, 1946 – January 15, 2020) was an American football player. A native of Grand Rapids, Michigan, he played high school football at Grand Rapids Central High School. He next played college football for the University of Michigan, principally as a defensive end and linebacker, from 1965 to 1967. He also played professional football as a linebacker for the St. Louis Cardinals from 1968 to 1971. In 2003, he was inducted into the Grand Rapids Sports Hall of Fame. In 2011, Rosema lost a lawsuit against the NFL Players Association alleging that he was owed pension benefits.

He died of dementia on January 15, 2020, in Grand Rapids, Michigan at age 73. He is one of at least 345 NFL players to be diagnosed after death with chronic traumatic encephalopathy (CTE), which is caused by repeated hits to the head.
