= George Hoey =

American football player (born 1946)

No. 45, 23, 49
- Positions: Defensive back, Return specialist

Personal information
- Born: November 14, 1946 (age 79); Gaffney, South Carolina, U.S.
- Listed height: 5 ft 10 in (1.78 m)
- Listed weight: 174 lb (79 kg)

Career information
- High school: Central (Flint, Michigan)
- College: Michigan (1965-1968)
- NFL draft: 1969: 14th round, 346th overall pick

Career history
- St. Louis Cardinals (1971); New England Patriots (1972–1973); San Diego Chargers (1974); Denver Broncos (1975); New York Jets (1975)

Awards and highlights
- Second-team All-Big Ten (1967)

Career NFL statistics
- Interceptions: 2
- Fumble recoveries: 2
- Kick/punt return yards: 572
- Touchdowns: 1
- Stats at Pro Football Reference

George William Hoey (born November 14, 1946) is an American former professional football player who was a defensive back, punt returner and kickoff returner in the National Football League (NFL). He played college football for the Michigan Wolverines (1966–1968) and in the NFL for the Arizona Cardinals (1971), New England Patriots (1972–1973), San Diego Chargers (1974), Denver Broncos (1975), and New York Jets (1975).

In high school, Hoey was an All-State halfback. At the University of Michigan, College Football Hall of Fame halfback Ron Johnson was in Hoey's class, and Hoey was therefore used principally as a defensive back. Hoey is most remembered for his work as a punt returner at Michigan. He led the Big Ten Conference in punt return yards in 1967 and 1968, and still holds Michigan's modern era (post-1949) records for most punt return yards in a game (140), most return yards per punt in a season (24.3) and most return yards per punt in a career (17.1). Hoey was also a record-setting sprinter on Michigan's track and field team.

In five seasons in the NFL, Hoey was principally a kickoff returner. In 1971, he set a St. Louis Cardinals club record with six kickoff returns for 206 yards, including one for 103 yards and a touchdown. He had 534 kickoff return yards in his career.

Since 1993, Hoey has worked in administration at the University of Colorado. He worked first in academic services for the athletic department. After controversies in the late 1990s concerning eligibility of University of Colorado athletes, Hoey accepted a position in the school's career services department providing career counseling to student athletes.

== High school athlete at Flint Central ==
Hoey was born in Gaffney, South Carolina. He moved with his family from South Carolina to Flint, Michigan at age 13. At Flint Central High School, he excelled in both football and track. When No. 1 ranked Flint Central met No. 2 ranked Bay City Central in 1963, it was billed as the "Game of the Year." Flint Central won the game 25–18, as Hoey (then only a junior) scored three touchdowns, including a 63-yard punt return for a touchdown, and a pass interception that Hoey ran back 35 yards for a touchdown on the final play of the game. As a senior in 1964, Hoey was named an All-State halfback by The Detroit News and UPI. In naming him to its All-State team, the UPI noted: "Hoey, a 5-foot-10, 165-pounder, gained 502 yards in 64 carries and caught 17 passes. He scored 11 touchdowns to lead the Saginaw Valley Conference for the second straight year. A great broken-field runner, he has scored eight touchdowns on kickoff or punt returns during his two-year stint with the varsity." He also led the Saginaw Valley Conference in scoring for two seasons. On his high school track team, Hoey won the 60-yard dash at the Central Michigan Relays Invitational indoor meet with a time of 6.3 seconds. He was All-State in track at the 1965 Michigan High School Athletic Association Class A track meet.

== University of Michigan track and football star ==
In 1965, Hoey became the first African-American athlete from Flint to earn a University of Michigan scholarship. At Michigan, Hoey excelled in both football and track. In track, Hoey set a 60-yard dash record with a time of 6.1 in 1966. He was a member of the Wolverines' record-setting 4 × 100 metres relay with a time of 40.6. In football, Hoey did not make the team as a halfback, having the misfortune to be in the same class as College Football Hall of Famer Ron Johnson. He started only three games at halfback during his time at Michigan (and one at fullback). With Ron Johnson playing halfback, Hoey was used principally as a defensive back and punt returner. Playing against Navy in 1968, Hoey had two interceptions which he returned for 31 yards, and punt returns of 63 and 36 yards. He was named an All-Big Ten defensive back in 1968.

=== Punt return records at Michigan ===
Though he was also an All-Big Ten defensive back, Hoey is most remembered as one of the leading punt returners in Michigan history. He led the Big Ten in punt return yards in 1967 and 1968, and holds several Michigan school records for punt returns, including most return yards in a game and most yards per return in a season and a career.

==== Most yards in a game ====
On October 28, 1967, Hoey gained 140 yards on four punt returns against Minnesota—still Michigan's single-game record for punt return yardage. Hoey and Steve Breaston are the only two Michigan players with two games in the top ten single-game performances by a Michigan punt returner.

Name	Number	Yards	Average	Touchdowns	Long	Year	Opponent
George Hoey	4	140	35	0		1967	Minnesota
Tripp Welborne	5	117	23.4	0	60	1990	Indiana
Steve Breaston	9	116	12.9	0	29	2006	Wisconsin
Marquise Walker	7	112	16	0	42	2001	Purdue
Steve Breaston	4	112	28	1	67	2004	Northwestern
Derrick Alexander	4	108	27	1	80	1992	Michigan State
Julius Curry	8	105	13.1	0	19	2002	Utah
Steve Breaston	4	105	26.3	0	55	2003	Notre Dame
George Hoey	2	99	49.5	0	63	1968	Navy
Evan Cooper	6	99	16.5	0	31	1983	Minnesota

==== Most yards per return in a season ====
Hoey also holds the modern (post-1949) Michigan school record for yards per return in a season. His 1967 average of 24.3 yards/return exceeds any other modern Michigan punt returner by more than eight yards per return (minimum 1.2 return per team game played). Hoey's 1967 average ranks sixth in NCAA Division I-A history behind the all-time Michigan leader Gene Derricotte who ranks fifth. However, the Michigan record books base single-season leadership based upon minimum 15 returns per game and Hoey's name is omitted.

Name	Number	Yards	Average	Touchdowns	Long	Year
George Hoey	12	291	24.3	1	60	1967
Barry Pierson	19	300	15.8	1	60	1969
Terry Barr	14	219	15.6	1	82	1955
Anthony Carter	18	270	15	1	72	1982
Tripp Welborne	31	455	14.7	0	60	1990

N.B.:The database used here includes stats since 1949. Totals before 1949 are not included here; for example, Gene Derricotte averaged over 24 yards per return prior to 1949.

==== Most yards per return in a career ====
Hoey also holds the Michigan school record for punt return yards per return in a career with an average of 17.1 yards per return.

Name	Number	Yards	Average	Touchdowns	Long	Start	End
George Hoey	31	529	17.1	1	63	1967	1968
Terry Barr	24	393	16.4	1	82	1954	1956
Barry Pierson	20	300	15	1	60	1968	1969
Desmond Howard	26	337	13	1	93	1990	1991
Derrick Alexander	42	534	12.7	4	80	1992	1993

== NFL football player ==
Hoey was selected 346th overall by the Detroit Lions in the 14th round of the 1969 NFL draft. He played five seasons in the NFL for the St. Louis Cardinals (1971), New England Patriots (1972–1973), San Diego Chargers (1974), Denver Broncos (1975) and New York Jets (1975). Hoey played in 53 NFL games and had four punt returns for 38 return yards, 21 kickoff returns for 534 return yards, and two interceptions for 45 return yards. He set a Cardinals club record with six kickoff returns for 206 yards, one for 103 yards and a touchdown against the Philadelphia Eagles. The club record for longest return was broken in 1979 by Roy Green, who posted a 106-yard return. Hoey had the misfortune of playing with losing teams throughout his NFL career. The best team that he played for was the 1975 Denver Broncos, who recorded a 6–8 record.

== Professional career at the University of Colorado ==
Hoey has worked in various capacities at the University of Colorado. From 1993–1999, Hoey was involved in academic services in Colorado's athletic department. Hoey "came under fire for an eligibility problem of a prospective CU athlete," including linebacker Anwawn Jones who lost a year of eligibility and was forced to sit out the 1999 NCAA Division I-A football season due to an error in calculating his transfer credits. In 1999, Hoey transferred out of the athletic department and began working in the university's career services department. That October, Jones told The Denver Post that Hoey "wasn't necessarily a scapegoat, but there were definitely mistakes made in his department." Recruiting issues arose after Rick Neuheisel departed as Colorado's head football coach and were part of broader problems that resulted in the school's being placed on two years' probation for 53 rules violations, 51 occurring while Neuheisel was the Colorado coach.

In 2004, the Colorado Daily reported that Hoey was a career counselor working with all students to help them prepare for their future careers. I provide information that will hopefully have them taking advantage of many services and resources." In May 2007, Hoey was the University of Colorado's career development coordinator and a co-chair of the Black Faculty/Staff Association, and the Virginia Patterson Chapter of Mortar Board Honors Society at the University of Colorado honored Hoey for his efforts to educate students.

== Family and honors ==
Herb Washington, former Oakland A and world-class sprinter, is Hoey's cousin. Hoey is married to Erin Hoag and has two sons, William and Sean. He was inducted into the Greater Flint Afro-American Hall of Fame in 2001, and he was inducted into the Greater Flint Area Sports Hall of Fame in 2003.

== Career statistics ==
Year	Team	KR	Yards	Avg	TDs	PR	Yards	Avg	TD	Int.	Yards	Average
1967	Michigan Wolverines	--	--	--	--	12	291	24.3	1	--	--	--
1968	Michigan Wolverines	12	221	18.4	--	19	238	12.5	0	2	31	15.5
	Career	12	221	18.4	--	31	529	17.1	1	2	31	15.5
1971	St. Louis Cardinals	9	251	27.9	1	--	--	--	--	--	--	0
1972	New England Patriots	9	210	23.3	0	--	--	--	--	1	25	25
1973	New England Patriots	--	--	--	--	--	--	--	--	--	--	0
1974	San Diego Chargers	3	73	24.3	0	4	38	9.5	--	1	20	20
1975	New York Jets	--	--	--	--	--	--	--	--	--	--	--
1975	Denver Broncos	--	--	--	--	--	--	--	--	--	--	--
	TOTAL	21	534	25.4	1	4	38	9.5	0	2	45	--

== See also ==
- List of NCAA major college yearly punt and kickoff return leaders
