= Tom Domres =

American football player (1946–1999)

No. 59, 71, 76
- Position: Defensive tackle

Personal information
- Born: October 19, 1946; Marshfield, Wisconsin, U.S.
- Died: November 8, 1999 (aged 53); Rosemount, Minnesota, U.S.
- Listed height: 6 ft 3 in (1.91 m)
- Listed weight: 260 lb (118 kg)

Career information
- High school: Gladstone (Gladstone, Michigan)
- College: Wisconsin
- NFL draft: 1968: 10th round, 268th overall pick

Career history
- Houston Oilers (1968-1971); Denver Broncos (1971-1972)

Awards and highlights
- First-team All-Big Ten (1967)

Career NFL/AFL statistics
- Fumble recoveries: 2
- Touchdowns: 1
- Sacks: 12
- Stats at Pro Football Reference

Thomas Bruce Domres (October 19, 1946 – November 8, 1999) was an American professional football defensive tackle in the American Football League (AFL) (1968–1970) and the National Football League (NFL) (1970–1972). Born in Marshfield, Wisconsin, he played for the Houston Oilers (1968–1971) and the Denver Broncos (1971–1972). He played at the collegiate level at the University of Wisconsin–Madison.

== See also ==
- List of American Football League players
