= National Register of Historic Places listings in Fulton County, Kentucky =

Location of Fulton County in Kentucky

This is a list of the National Register of Historic Places listings in Fulton County, Kentucky.

This is intended to be a complete list of the properties and districts on the National Register of Historic Places in Fulton County, Kentucky, United States. The locations of National Register properties and districts for which the latitude and longitude coordinates are included below, may be seen in a map.

There are 16 properties and districts listed on the National Register in the county.

This National Park Service list is complete through NPS recent listings posted September 26, 2025.

== Current listings ==
	Name on the Register	Image	Date listed	Location	City or town	Description
1	Adams Site (15FU4)		March 15, 1984 (#84001421)	Southern side of Bayou de Chien, northeast of Hickman; 36°36′05″N 89°06′16″W	Hickman	Also known as "Fort Bayou de Chien" or the "Roberts Mounds"; Fulton County's largest mound complex
2	Amburg Mounds Site (15FU15)		December 31, 1985 (#85003183)	Southwest of Hickman; 36°32′43″N 89°14′40″W	Hickman	Two Woodland period mounds several miles west of Hickman
3	Buchanan Street Historic District	Buchanan Street Historic District	August 3, 1990 (#90000779)	Roughly bounded by Wellington, Obion, Buchanan, and Union Sts. 36°34′13″N 89°11′46″W	Hickman	
4	Carnegie Library	Carnegie Library	August 3, 1990 (#90000780)	Moscow Ave. between Troy Ave. and 3rd St. 36°34′18″N 89°11′07″W	Hickman	
5	Carr Historic District	Carr Historic District	May 2, 2001 (#01000451)	Roughly bounded by Carr, 4th, W. State Line and West Sts. 36°30′18″N 88°52′52″W	Fulton	
6	Ben F. Carr Jr. House	Ben F. Carr Jr. House	July 16, 1979 (#79000987)	203 2nd St. 36°30′13″N 88°52′47″W	Fulton	
7	Confederate Memorial Gateway in Hickman	Confederate Memorial Gateway in Hickman	July 17, 1997 (#97000700)	Hickman City Cemetery, 0.5 miles south of the junction of Kentucky Routes 125 and 199; 36°33′30″N 89°10′40″W	Hickman	
8	Confederate Memorial in Fulton	Confederate Memorial in Fulton	July 17, 1997 (#97000699)	Fairview Cemetery, 2 blocks north of the junction of College and 5th Sts. 36°30′44″N 88°52′49″W	Fulton	
9	Fulton County Courthouse	Fulton County Courthouse	April 22, 1976 (#76000887)	Off KY 94; 36°34′18″N 89°11′38″W	Hickman	
10	Fulton Downtown Historic District	Fulton Downtown Historic District	August 1, 2003 (#03000710)	Park of Carr, Commercial, Lake, Main and Walnut Sts. 36°30′16″N 88°52′31″W	Fulton	
11	Old Hickman Historic District	Old Hickman Historic District	August 3, 1990 (#90000778)	Roughly bounded by Clinton, Exchange, Obion, Moulton, and Kentucky Sts. 36°34′20″N 89°11′42″W	Hickman	
12	Running Slough Site (15FU67)		December 5, 1985 (#85003062)	Along Running Slough on the eastern edge of the Reelfoot National Wildlife Refuge; 36°31′00″N 89°17′50″W	Hickman	
13	Sassafras Ridge Site (15FU3)	Sassafras Ridge Site (15FU3)	November 23, 1984 (#84000285)	Fish Pond Rd., west of Hickman; 36°34′34″N 89°19′13″W	Hickman	
14	Thomas Chapel C.M.E. Church	Thomas Chapel C.M.E. Church	January 9, 1979 (#79000988)	Moscow Ave. 36°34′17″N 89°11′21″W	Hickman	
15	White Site (15FU24)		March 21, 1988 (#88000183)	0.8 miles (1.3 km) north of the Adams Site; 36°36′47″N 89°06′05″W	Moscow	
16	Jesse Whitesell House	Jesse Whitesell House	August 29, 1977 (#77000619)	West of Fulton on Kentucky Route 116; also Kentucky Route 116 west of the Purchase Parkway; 36°30′10″N 88°54′07″W	Fulton	West of the Parkway represents a boundary increase of February 4, 2009, the Jesse Whitesell Farm, which extends into Obion County, Tennessee

== Former listing ==
	Name on the Register	Image	Date listed	Date removed	Location	City or town	Description
1	Vendome Opera House		October 16, 1974 (#74002273)	April 11, 1975	Main and Commercial Sts.	Fulton	Demolished in 1975.

== See also ==
- List of National Historic Landmarks in Kentucky
- National Register of Historic Places listings in Kentucky
