= List of United States post office murals in Kentucky =

Following is a list of United States post office murals created in Kentucky between 1934 and 1943.

Location	Mural title	Image	Artist	Date	Notes	NRHP listed
Anchorage	Meeting the Train		Loren R. Fisher	1939	oil on linen	
Berea	Berea Commencement in the Old Days		Frank Weathers Long	1940		
Flemingsburg	Crossing To the Battle of Blue Licks		Lucile Blanch	1943		
Fort Thomas	General G. H. Thomas and Philip Sheridan		Lucienne Bloch	1942		
Greenville	Source of Power		Allan Gould	1940	oil on canvas; only surviving panel from an original set of six	
Hardinsburg	Kentucky Homestead		Nathaniel Koffman	1942		
Harrodsburg	An Indian Attack		Orville Carroll	1941		
Harrodsburg	George Rogers Clark Being Welcomed at Fort Harrod		Orville Carroll	1941		
Harrodsburg	Pioneers Being Refreshed at the Spring in Fort Harrod		Orville Carroll	1941		
Harrodsburg	Daniel Boone and Michael Stoner Arriving at Harrod's Settlement		Orville Carroll	1941		
Harrodsburg	Death of a Settler By An Indians Arrow		Orville Carroll	1941		
Harrodsburg	First School in Kentucky Taught at Fort Harrod by Mrs. Jane Coomes		Orville Carroll	1941		
Hickman	Mississippi Packets		William E. L. Bunn	1940	winner of the 48-State Mural Competition	1990
Hodgenville	Hodgen's Mill		Schomer Lichtner	1943	oil on canvas	
Lexington	Daniel Boone's Arrival in Kentucky		Ward Lockwood	1938	oil on canvas	
Louisville	Activities of the Region		Frank Weathers Long	1935	Consists of 10 separate murals, some of the earliest commissioned for TRAP	
Morehead	The Rural Free Delivery		Frank Weathers Long	1939	former post office is now the Morehead Municipal Building	
Morganfield	Rural Free Delivery		Bert Mullins	1939		
Pineville	Kentucky Mountain Mail En Route		Edward Fern	1942		
Princeton	Kentucky Tobacco Field		Robert C. Purdy	1938		
Williamsburg	Floating Horses Down the Cumberland River		Alios Fabry	1939		
