= Guidugli =

Guidugli is a surname. Notable people with the surname include:

- Gino Guidugli (born 1983), American football player and coach
- Benjamin Guidugli (born 1987), American football player
