= DJ Campbell (disambiguation) =

D. J. Campbell or DJ Campbell may refer to:

- DJ Campbell (born 1981), English footballer
- D. J. Campbell (safety) (born 1989), American football safety
- DJ Campbell (offensive lineman) (born 2003), American football offensive lineman
