= White Site =

Archaeological site in Kentucky, US

- White Site (15FU24)
- U.S. National Register of Historic Places
- Location within Kentucky Location within the United States
- Location: 0.8 miles (1.3 km) north of the Adams site
- Nearest city: Moscow, Kentucky
- Coordinates: 36°36′47″N 89°6′5″W
- Area: 10 acres (4.0 ha)
- NRHP reference No.: 88000183
- Added to NRHP: March 21, 1988

The White Site is a prehistoric archaeological site located northeast of Hickman in Fulton County in the southwestern corner of the U.S. state of Kentucky. Discovered in the 1980s, it was occupied during a long period of time by peoples of multiple cultures, and it has been named a historic site.

== Geography ==
The White Site lies at the edge of the floodplain along the Mississippi River, north of a small river known as Bayou de Chien. Most of the soil is loam, although careless clearing of hardwood forests in the nineteenth century resulted in extensive erosion. A small stream, tributary to Bayou de Chien, flows immediately to the north and west, while the remains of a dirt road transverse the site from northeast to southwest. The site occupies a terrace with an elevation of 100–103 m (328–338 ft); its overall size is approximately 400 metres (1,300 ft) from east to west and 200 metres (660 ft) from north to south.

== Investigations ==
The site remained unknown to archaeologists until the 1980s; an archaeological survey of Kentucky's Mississippi River counties, published in 1981, contained the first record of the site. This project, consisting solely of surface collections, suggested that White was inhabited during the Woodland period, but test excavations in early 1986 discovered artifacts of other cultures as well. Initial stages of excavations were concentrated on a single house, the foundations of which included trenches dug for the walls and the roof supports; it was demonstrated to have been destroyed by fire, and radiocarbon dating of its postholes produced dates ranging from AD 1277 to 1427. Because the initial excavation was interested primarily in identifying the ceramic culture of the inhabitants, most work concentrated on the recovery of potsherds.

Comprising the house foundation and other nearby areas, the site yielded 154 sherds, plus a pottery trowel, quantities of daub, dozens of lithic flakes, four lithic cores, and larger stone tools such as pieces of hoes, two bifaces, and two projectile points. Pottery styles varied; Mississippian and Woodland pottery styles were approximately equal in number, with plain shell-tempered pottery representing nearly 40% of the total, in addition to a small number of sherds demonstrating Wickliffe influences. Pieces of 295 bones, all burned, were also discovered; most were mammalian, although fish bones and turtle shells were present in small numbers. By far the most common plant remains were bits of charcoal, although nutshells (primarily hickory) were also discovered, along with a small number of corn cupules. As a whole, the botanical items were similar to those of the nearby Adams site.

== Conclusions ==
The team conducting the test excavation deemed its most significant accomplishment to be the excavation of the house, although their demonstration of the site's size was also important: isolated farmsteads and tiny hamlets from the Mississippian period had been found within 3 kilometres (1.9 mi) of the Adams site, but the White Site was the first village found within that distance. Ceremonial and religious activities discovered near other major Mississippian settlements were generally centered on major mound sites, such as Adams, and the lack of mounds at White and its proximity to Adams led the archaeological team to conclude that White's inhabitants looked to Adams for ceremonial purposes. Although the presence of Woodland-period artifacts at White was clearly confirmed, with influence from peoples such as the Baytown culture and Jonathan Creek, few solid conclusions could be drawn from the initial excavation.

== Preservation ==
In early 1988, the White Site was listed on the National Register of Historic Places because of its archaeological significance. It is one of five National Register-listed archaeological sites in Fulton County, along with the Adams, Running Slough, and Sassafras Ridge Sites, and the Amburg Mounds; all are Mississippian, except for the Woodland-era Amburg Mounds.
