= Jerry Reynolds (American football) =

American football player (born 1970)

No. 66
- Positions: Tackle, guard

Personal information
- Born: April 2, 1970 (age 56); Fort Thomas, Kentucky, U.S.
- Listed height: 6 ft 6 in (1.98 m)
- Listed weight: 320 lb (145 kg)

Career information
- High school: Highlands (Fort Thomas)
- College: UNLV
- NFL draft: 1994: 6th round, 184th overall pick

Career history
- Cincinnati Bengals (1994)*; Dallas Cowboys (1994); New York Giants (1995–1998)
- * Offseason or practice squad member only

Career NFL statistics
- Games played: 25
- Games started: 2
- Stats at Pro Football Reference

Jerry Bradford Reynolds (born April 2, 1970) is an American former professional football player who was an offensive lineman in the National Football League (NFL) for the Dallas Cowboys and the New York Giants. He played college football for the UNLV Rebels.

== Early life ==
Reynolds attended Highlands High School. He walked-on at the University of Nevada, Las Vegas. As a freshman, he appeared in 8 games. As a sophomore, he became a starter at right tackle, missing the last game with a back bruise. He started 21 games over his final two seasons.

== Professional career ==
=== Cincinnati Bengals ===
Reynolds was selected by the Cincinnati Bengals in the sixth round (184th overall) of the 1994 NFL draft. On August 28, he was waived and signed to the practice squad two days later.

=== Dallas Cowboys ===
On November 1, 1994, he was signed by the Dallas Cowboys from the Bengals' practice squad, after Erik Williams suffered a season-ending knee injury in a car accident. He was a backup player and was released on August 27, 1995.

=== New York Giants ===
On August 29, 1995, he was signed by the New York Giants to play guard and for depth purposes. The next year, he was moved to tackle. On February 11, 1999, he was released after only starting 2 games during his time with the team.
