= D.J. Campbell =

D.J. Campbell may refer to:

- DJ Campbell (born 1981), an association footballer
- D.J. Campbell (American football) (born 1989), American football safety
