= William Bunn =

William Bunn may refer to:

- William M. Bunn (1842–1923), American newspaperman and governor of Idaho Territory
- William E. L. Bunn (1910–2009), American artist
- Willie Bunn (born 1917), American baseball player
