= Adams site =

Historic site in Kentucky, United States

Adams Site (15 FU 4)
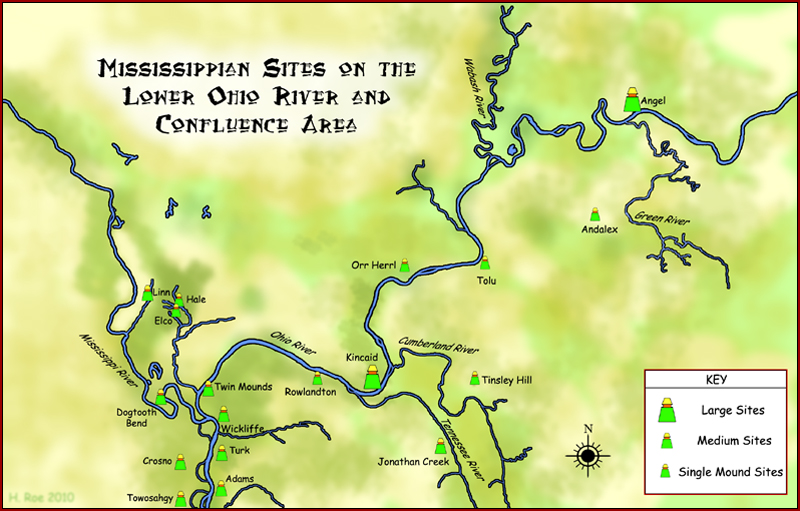
- Mississippian sites on the Lower Ohio River
- Interactive map of Adams Site (15 FU 4)
- 36.601498°N 89.104169°W
- Cultures: Mississippian culture
- Location: Hickman, Kentucky, Fulton County, Kentucky, USA
- Region: Fulton County, Kentucky
- Adams Site (15 Fu 4)
- U.S. National Register of Historic Places
- Area: 20 acres (8.1 ha)
- NRHP reference No.: 84001421
- Added to NRHP: March 15, 1984

The Adams Site (15FU4) is a Mississippian culture archaeological site located near Hickman in Fulton County, Kentucky, on Bayou de Chien, a creek that drains into the nearby Mississippi River.

== Description ==
The 7.25-hectare site is built over the remains of a Late Woodland village. It has a central group of platform mounds around a central plaza and another smaller plaza area to the southwest of the largest mound. The site was occupied from 1100 to 1500 CE during the Medley (1100 to 1300 CE) and Jackson (1300 to 1500 CE) phases of the local chronology. Some very deep midden areas have been excavated from the village surrounding the mounds and plazas, some as deep as 1 metre (3.3 ft) to 1.5 metres (4.9 ft) thick, attesting to the long term habitation of this site.

== See also ==
- White Site: a ≤nearby and possibly related site
- National Register of Historic Places listings in Fulton County, Kentucky
