= Fort Thomas Independent Schools =

School district in Kentucky, United States

Fort Thomas Independent School District or Fort Thomas Independent Schools is a school district headquartered in Fort Thomas, Kentucky, in the Greater Cincinnati area. It operates five schools, including three elementary schools, one middle school, and one high school.

== About ==
The Fort Thomas School District is ranked as the state's top district under the state's assessment program. With the 5 schools that make up the district, 4 of them have been named as a National Blue-Ribbon School of Excellence. The district value rigorous curriculum standards, exceptional parental involvement and community support plus excellence in extracurricular activities.

The district has a 1:1 ratio of students and faculty to personal devices. The elementary schools offer iPads while the middle and high schools offer MacBook Pro laptops.

== Demographics ==
With roughly 3,000 students enrolled, and 194 teachers, the student to teacher ratio is 16:1. Almost 92% of teachers have their master's degree in the district. The district does not offer much diversity with 90.3% of students being White, 3% Hispanic, 1% African American, etc.

== Recognition ==
Niche named Fort Thomas Independent Schools as the “Best Public School District in Kentucky”, as well as the #173 best school district in America out of 10,760.

== Schools ==
- Highlands High School
  - Highlands High School was founded in 1888. The school sits in the center of the small town of Fort Thomas, Kentucky, a 10-minute drive from Downtown Cincinnati.
  - The average combined junior ACT score is a 22.2, as compared to the Kentucky state average of 18.1.
  - The school's graduation rate, defined as the proportion of 9th graders who receive a high school diploma in four years, is tied for 26th best in Kentucky.
  - 42% of graduates are proficient in the sciences.
  - Student body is composed of 10% minority students.
- Highlands Middle School
  - Highlands Middle School offers 6th through 8th grade. A majority of the students enrolled graduated from one of the 3 elementary schools in the district and are likely to attend Highlands High School.
- Robert D. Johnson Elementary
  - Named after Robert D. Johnson, a sergeant in the Marine Corps during World War I, Johnson Elementary opened in 1923 on the north end of Fort Thomas, KY. The principal of the school describes the school as a safe, orderly, family environment where the students can grow and learn. After recently rebuilding the entire school, the 2021-2022 students have a brand-new school to attend to.
- Ruth Moyer Elementary School
  - Moyer Elementary school has the highest enrollment of students compared to the other elementary schools.
  - Moyer Elementary School represents one of only 57 schools nationally to earn the distinction of becoming a 2020 National Elementary and Secondary Education Act (“ESEA”) Distinguished School.
- Samuel Woodfill Elementary School
  - Named after Samuel E. Woodfill, one the most decorated of soldiers World War I, Woodfill Elementary school sits on the south end of Fort Thomas.
  - From Niche, it is ranked as the third best public elementary school in Kentucky out of 708.
