= Mike Mitchell (safety) =

American football player (born 1987)

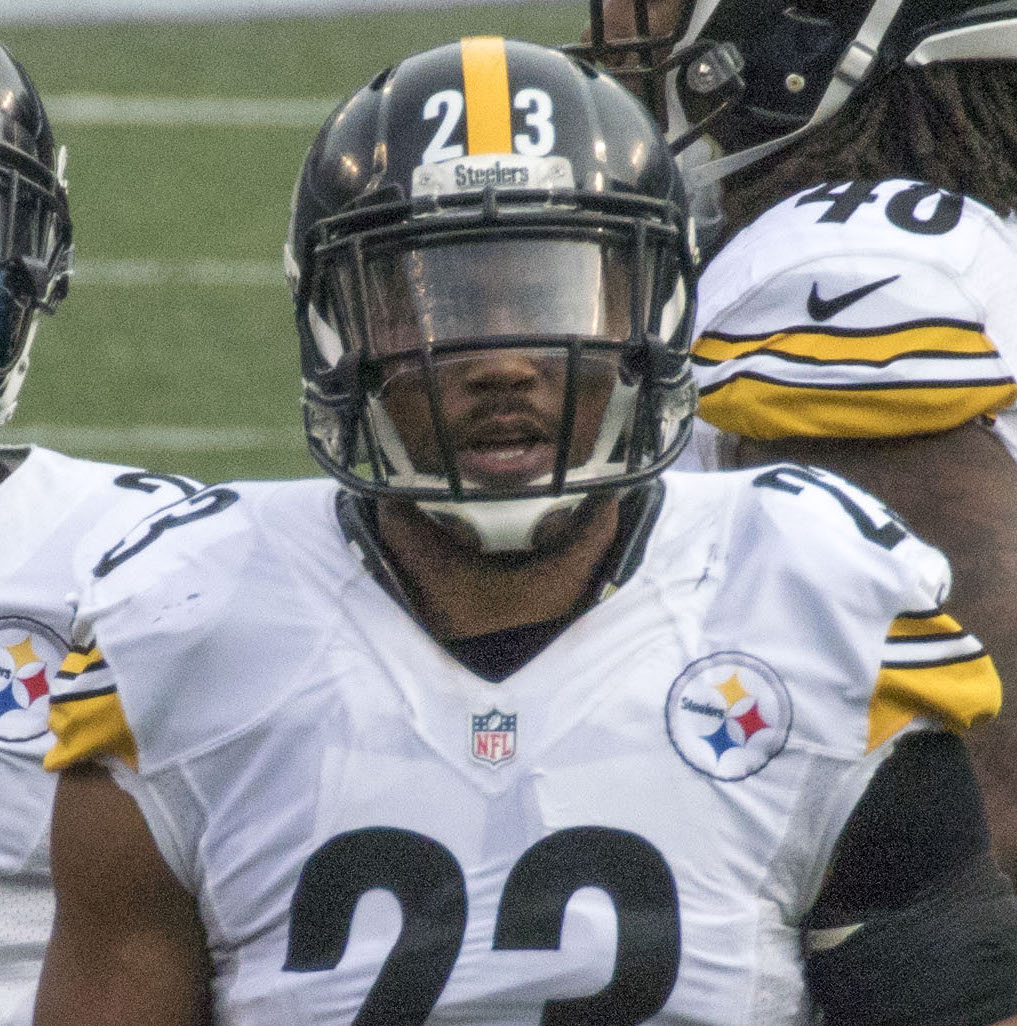
- Mitchell with the Pittsburgh Steelers in 2015

No. 34, 21, 23
- Position: Safety

Personal information
- Born: June 10, 1987 (age 39); Fort Thomas, Kentucky, U.S.
- Listed height: 6 ft 1 in (1.85 m)
- Listed weight: 221 lb (100 kg)

Career information
- High school: Highlands (Fort Thomas)
- College: Ohio
- NFL draft: 2009: 2nd round, 47th overall pick

Career history

Playing
- Oakland Raiders (2009–2012); Carolina Panthers (2013); Pittsburgh Steelers (2014–2017); Indianapolis Colts (2018)

Coaching
- Indianapolis Colts (2022–2023) Assistants defensive backs coach

Career NFL statistics
- Total tackles: 514
- Sacks: 7.5
- Forced fumbles: 9
- Pass deflections: 42
- Interceptions: 11
- Stats at Pro Football Reference

Michael Mitchell (born June 10, 1987) is an American former professional football player who was a safety for 10 seasons in the National Football League (NFL). He played college football for the Ohio Bobcats and was selected by the Oakland Raiders in the second round of the 2009 NFL draft. Mitchell spent four seasons each with the Raiders and Pittsburgh Steelers, in addition to being a member of the Carolina Panthers and Indianapolis Colts for one season each.

== Early life ==
Mitchell attended Covington Catholic High School in Park Hills, Kentucky for his first three years. He lettered as a sophomore and junior before transferring to Highlands High School in Fort Thomas, Kentucky, where he lettered one, and earned Kentucky All-Star honors, in addition to being selected honorable mention All-State as a senior. That year, he led the team to the state title, but did not participate in the title game due to eligibility reasons, recording 87 tackles with three forced fumbles and two fumble recoveries, returning one for a touchdown.

Mitchell was at the center of KHSAA transfer controversy after he transferred to Highlands for his senior year. Highlands High School was required to forfeit the 12 wins that Mitchell participated in, making the school the only team to ever go 2-13 and be State Champions. The district appealed in 2010 and the wins were later re-instated.

== College career ==
Mitchell began attending Ohio University in 2005 to play football for first-year coach Frank Solich. He began the season on the bench but eventually earned his first career start in the second game against Pittsburgh, a 16-10 OT victory. On October 8, he made his first tackle in a game against Bowling Green and ended the game with 5 altogether and one for a loss. Ohio played Toledo in week 10 and Mitchell had a career-high 8 tackles and forced a fumble. He finished his freshman season with a total of 21 tackles, 2 pass deflections, and a forced fumble for an Ohio team that ended the season at 4–7.

He returned in 2006 for his second season and began the season as a back-up but played in all 14 games. For week 6, Ohio played Western Michigan and Mitchell recorded a season-high 7 tackles in the 27–20 victory. The next week he received his first start at free safety against Illinois and maintained the starting role for the next seven games. In a week 10 matchup against Eastern Michigan, he made his first career interception in the fourth quarter that led to the game-winning touchdown. The Bobcats played Central Michigan in the MAC Championship, with Mitchell shifting over to strong safety and ending the game with 6 tackles and an interception. After losing to Southern Mississippi, Mitchell ended his season with 55 tackles, 5 tackles for a loss, 1 sack, 2 interceptions, and a forced fumble.

After a season where the Bobcats ended with a 9–5 record, Mitchell would return as the Bobcats starting strong safety in 2007, despite having many injuries. During a week 4 contest with Wyoming, he would amass a career-high 14 tackles and 2 interceptions. The next game, Mitchell would assist 7 tackles and have 1.5 tackles for loss against Kent State. He would end the season with a career-high 74 tackles, 4 tackles for loss, 1.5 sacks, 2 interceptions, and a team-high 47 solo tackles.

For his final year Mitchell started 11 games at strong safety for the Bobcats. During a week 4 contest at Northwestern, he picked off 2 passes in an 8–16 loss. While playing against VMI, he made 4.5 tackles for a loss and 2 forced fumbles. After sitting out week 11 against Bowling Green with an injury, he returned the next game against Akron; Mitchell made 9 tackles in the 49–42 victory. He finished his senior campaign with 62 tackles and led the team with 3 interceptions.

Mitchell started 30 of 45 games at Ohio—23 at strong safety and seven at free safety. He ended his career at Ohio with a total of 213 tackles, 126 solo, 14.5 tackles for loss, 3 sacks, 5 forced fumbles, and 7 interceptions for 140 return yards.

== Professional career ==
=== Pre-draft ===
Mitchell wasn't invited to the NFL Combine, but performed at Ohio's Pro Day and was said to have had an impressive showing and one of the best pro days of any player in the 2009 NFL Draft. He ran a 4.39-second 40-yard dash and he did 22 repetitions of 225 pounds on the bench press to go along with a 37½-inch vertical and a 10-foot, 3-inch broad jump. Mitchell met with upwards of 15 NFL teams throughout the draft process. He was projected to be a sixth-round or seventh-round draft pick by the majority of NFL draft experts and analysts. He was ranked the seventh-best strong safety by NFLDraftScout.com.

Pre-draft measurables
Height	Weight	40-yard dash	10-yard split	20-yard split	20-yard shuttle	Three-cone drill	Vertical jump	Broad jump	Bench press
6 ft 1 3/4 in (1.87 m)	216 lb (98 kg)	4.39 s	1.50 s	2.55 s	4.19 s	6.85 s	37 1/2 in (0.95 m)	10 ft 3 in (3.12 m)	22 reps
All values from Ohio's Pro Day

=== Oakland Raiders ===
==== 2009 NFL draft ====
The Oakland Raiders selected Mitchell in the second round (47th overall) of the 2009 NFL draft. He was the fourth safety selected in that draft.

The Oakland Raiders' selection of Mitchell was highly scrutinized by the analysts and drew an uproar among fans at Radio City Music Hall. NFL analyst Mike Mayock graded him in the seventh round and Mel Kiper Jr. stated that the Raiders could've possibly signed him as an undrafted free agent. His selection echoed Al Davis' pattern of selecting players who are the fastest and typically have performed well at the 40-yard dash. In the first round (7th overall), the Raiders selected wide receiver Darrius Heyward-Bey, who had run the fastest 40-yard dash among all the receivers at the NFL combine. Later, it was reported that Mitchell was possibly being targeted by the Chicago Bears (selecting at 49—two spots behind the Raiders). Mitchell has stated that the Bears had called him around the 40th overall pick and told him to "stay close to the phone." Chicago Bears' General Manager Jerry Angelo said that after both Mike Mitchell and Brian Robiskie were selected before they could select them, they opted to trade out of the round. Mayock later apologized to the Raiders for Mitchell's low draft grade.

Mel Kiper Jr. later gave it "Most Likely To Make The Raiders Look Good Award", stating "Oakland took Michael Mitchell, OK?" "I asked teams after the draft. The misnomer is it's all Mel Kiper's opinion, it's all Todd McShay. You have to ask other teams. We're not the end-all, be-all. Some said they had him as a free agent. One team told me they had Michael Mitchell in the third round. They had him as a Pro Bowler. They think it's a great pick by the Oakland Raiders. So Oakland wasn't the only team out on the island that saw something in that kid."

“He’s a second-round pick. I’m happy for him. I had him between 40 and 73 at safety, with a seventh-round grade,” -Mel Kiper Jr.

Mitchell was the highest Ohio player to be drafted since Gene Ruskowski's fifth-round selection (44th overall) by the Los Angeles Rams in 1948. The last time an Ohio student-athlete was selected in a higher round was the Bobcats' only first-round selection, Art Lewis (ninth overall) in 1936 by the New York Giants.

==== 2009 ====
On July 29, 2009, the Oakland Raiders signed Mitchell to a four-year, $3.77 million contract that included $2.03 million guaranteed and a signing bonus of $1.61 million.

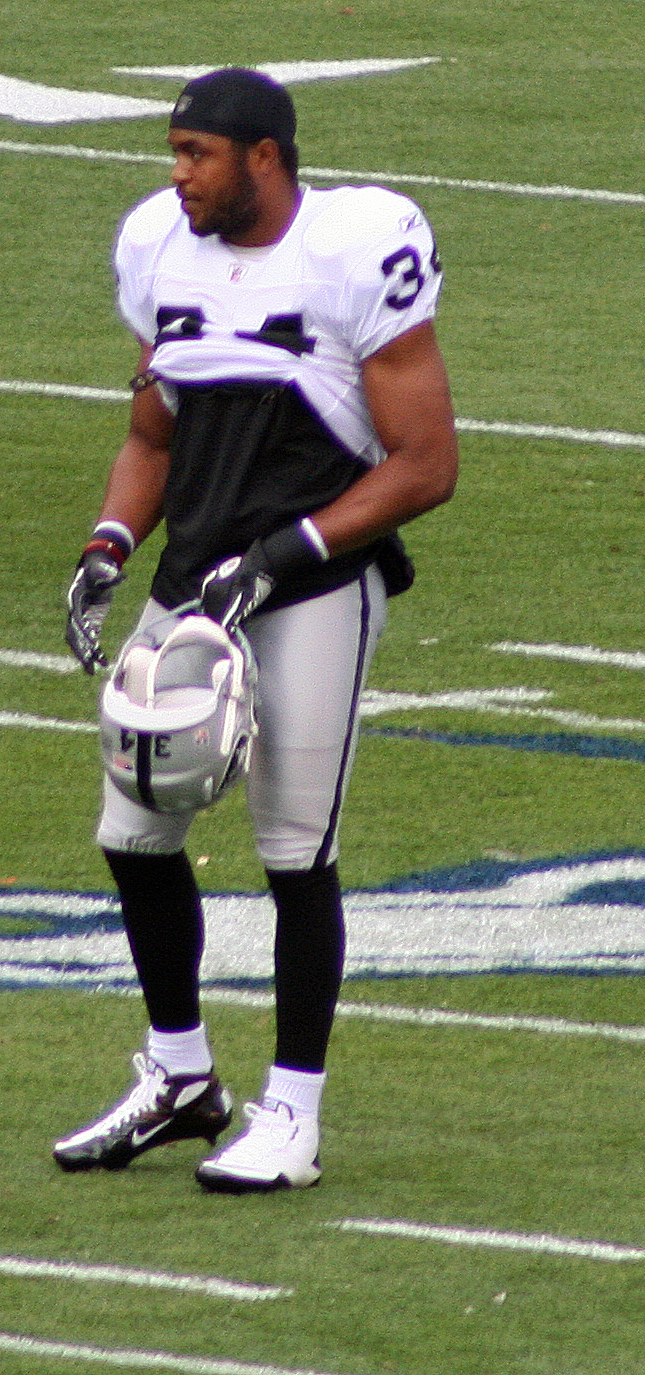
Mitchell with the Raiders in 2010

He began training camp competing with veteran Michael Huff for vacant strong safety job left by the departure of Gibril Wilson. Head coach Tom Cable named Mitchell the backup strong safety to Tyvon Branch who won the job after emerging as the top option in training camp.

He made his professional regular season debut in the Oakland Raiders' season-opener against the San Diego Chargers and made one tackle in the 20–24 loss. On September 27, 2009, Mitchell recorded a season-high three solo tackles in a 3–23 loss to the Denver Broncos. On December 13, 2009, he earned a tackle and made his first career sack on Redskins' quarterback Jason Campbell during a 13–34 loss. He finished his rookie season with 16 combined tackles (11 solo) in 16 games and had zero starts.

==== 2010 ====
Mitchell competed with Tyvon Branch and rookie Stevie Brown for the starting role as the strong safety, but was eventually named the backup to Branch to start the season.

On September 26, 2010, he earned his first career start and made two combined tackles in a 23–24 loss to the Arizona Cardinals. During a Week 9 matchup against the Kansas City Chiefs, Mitchell finished the 23–20 victory with a season-high seven combined tackles. On December 12, 2010, he intercepted his first career pass from Jaguars' quarterback David Garrard and made two solo tackles during the Raiders' 31–38 loss. He finished his second season in the NFL with 51 total tackles, five pass deflections, and an interception in three starts and 16 games.

==== 2011 ====
After an 8–8 season in 2010, the Oakland Raiders decided to forgo offering an extension to head coach Tom Cable and promoted their offensive coordinator Hue Jackson to head coach. Mitchell lost the starting strong safety job to Tyvon Branch for the third consecutive season.

Mitchell wasn't able to appear in the first three games of the season after suffering a knee injury. He returned in Week 4 and made one tackle and sacked New England Patriots' quarterback Tom Brady, as the Raiders lost, 19–31. On October 23, 2011, Mitchell made a season-high five solo tackles during the Raiders' 0–28 loss to the Kansas City Chiefs. During a Week 12 matchup against the Chicago Bears, Mitchell earned his first start of the season and recorded two tackles in a 25–20 win. On December 11, 2011, Mitchell made his third consecutive start of the season against the Green Bay Packers and intercepted a pass from Aaron Rodgers while making four solo tackles during the Raiders' 16–46 loss. He finished 2011 with a total of 31 combined tackles (22 solo), five pass deflections, an interception, and one sack in 13 games and four starts. The Oakland Raiders did not qualify for a playoff berth after finishing 8-8 and head coach Hue Jackson was fired by Mark Davis at the end of the season.

==== 2012 ====
Mitchell remained the backup strong safety to Tyvon Branch under head coach Dennis Allen to begin the 2012 season. This marked Mitchell's third different head coach in four seasons. On November 18, 2012, Mitchell started his first game of the season against the New Orleans Saints and finished the 17–38 loss with a career-high 11 tackles. During a Week 14 contest against the Denver Broncos, he earned six solo tackles and sacked Peyton Manning, as the Raiders lost, 13–26. He finished his final season with the Raiders with 41 combined tackles (32 solo) and one sack while starting two games and playing in all 16.

=== Carolina Panthers ===
On March 20, 2013, the Carolina Panthers signed Mitchell signed a one-year, $1 million contract with $250,000 signing bonus. He competed with Charles Godfrey, D. J. Campbell, and Anderson Russell throughout training camp for the job as the starting strong safety. Head coach Ron Rivera named him the backup to Charles Godfrey to start the 2013 season.

He played in his first game during a Week 2 match-up against the Buffalo Bills after Godfrey suffered a season-ending injury and made three solo tackles in his place. The following week, he earned his first start during a 38–0 victory over the New York Giants and made two tackles. During a Week 6 match-up against the Minnesota Vikings, he made seven total tackles and intercepted Vikings' quarterback Matt Cassel two times, returning them for 62-yards. The following game, he made a season-high eight solo tackles in a victory over the St. Louis Rams.

In his only season with the Panthers, he had a career season, making a career-high 3.5 sacks, career-high two forced fumbles, and a career-high four interceptions His play contributed to a season where the defense was ranked second in the NFL in total yards, rushing yards, and points, and helped the team win a division title and playoff berth for the first time in five years. Mitchell finished the season with a total of 66 combined tackles and a career-high 8 pass deflections.

=== Pittsburgh Steelers ===
==== 2014 ====
On March 11, 2014, the Pittsburgh Steelers signed Mitchell to a five-year, $25 million contract that includes $5.25 million guaranteed and a signing bonus of $4.75 million.

Entering training camp, he was the expected starting free safety, replacing Ryan Clark, who left for the Washington Redskins during the off-season. He started the season opener against the Cleveland Browns and made a season-high 7 combined tackles. During a Week 7 contest against the Houston Texans, he recorded a season-high six solo tackles. On October 25, 2012, he was fined $7,875 for taunting during a victory over the St. Louis Rams.

On November 17, 2014, Mitchell recorded five combined tackles in a 27–24 victory over the Tennessee Titans. The following day, it was reported that he was suspended from Twitter after direct messaging fans who were critical of his performance, saying things such as "die broke", "trash", and told another fan to go kill themself. After starting all 16 regular-season games, he finished with a total of 71 combined tackles and 3 pass deflections.

==== 2015 ====
The following season, he returned as the Steelers' starting strong safety under new defensive coordinator Keith Butler. On October 12, 2015, he made a season-high 7 solo tackles in a victory over the San Diego Chargers. Four days later, he was fined $8,681 for an unnecessary roughness penalty against Chargers' tight end Antonio Gates during the game. The following week, he made two tackles and intercepted a pass from Cardinals' quarterback Carson Palmer during the Steelers' 25–13 victory. It was his first interception with the Steelers. In Week 8, he intercepted Bengals' quarterback Andy Dalton and returned on for 7 yards, while also finishing the loss with five combined tackles. Mitchell finished the season with a career-high 80 combined tackles, three interceptions, a career-high nine pass deflections, and two forced fumbles.

==== 2016 ====
On November 24, 2016, Mitchell finished a Thursday Night Football victory over the Indianapolis Colts with a season-high seven combined tackles, six solo tackles, and intercepted quarterback Scott Tolzien for his first pick of the year. During a Week 17 matchup against the Cleveland Browns, Mitchell recorded seven solo tackles in a 27–24 victory. He finished the 2016 season with 77 combined tackles (55 solo), nine pass deflections, and an interception in 16 games and 16 starts.

==== 2017 ====
On October 15, 2017, Mitchell made three combined tackles in a 19–13 victory over the Kansas City Chiefs. During the game, he delivered a helmet-to-helmet hit on running back Charcandrick West that caused a concussion and placed West in the concussion protocol. Mitchell was later involved in another controversial hit when he delivered a low tackle to the back of quarterback Alex Smith's legs, well after the ball was thrown. Mitchell received widespread criticism from fans that deemed it "as dirty as it gets", "unnecessary", "egregiousness", and Smith later commented that it was, "as flagrant as it gets". On October 19, 2017, he was fined by the league for both hits: $48,620 for the hit on West and $9,115 for the low tackle on Smith. Mitchell's explanation for the hit on Smith was he felt like he was pushed or tripped and was falling and that Smith was also back-pedaling.

On March 14, 2018, Mitchell was released by the Steelers.

=== Indianapolis Colts ===
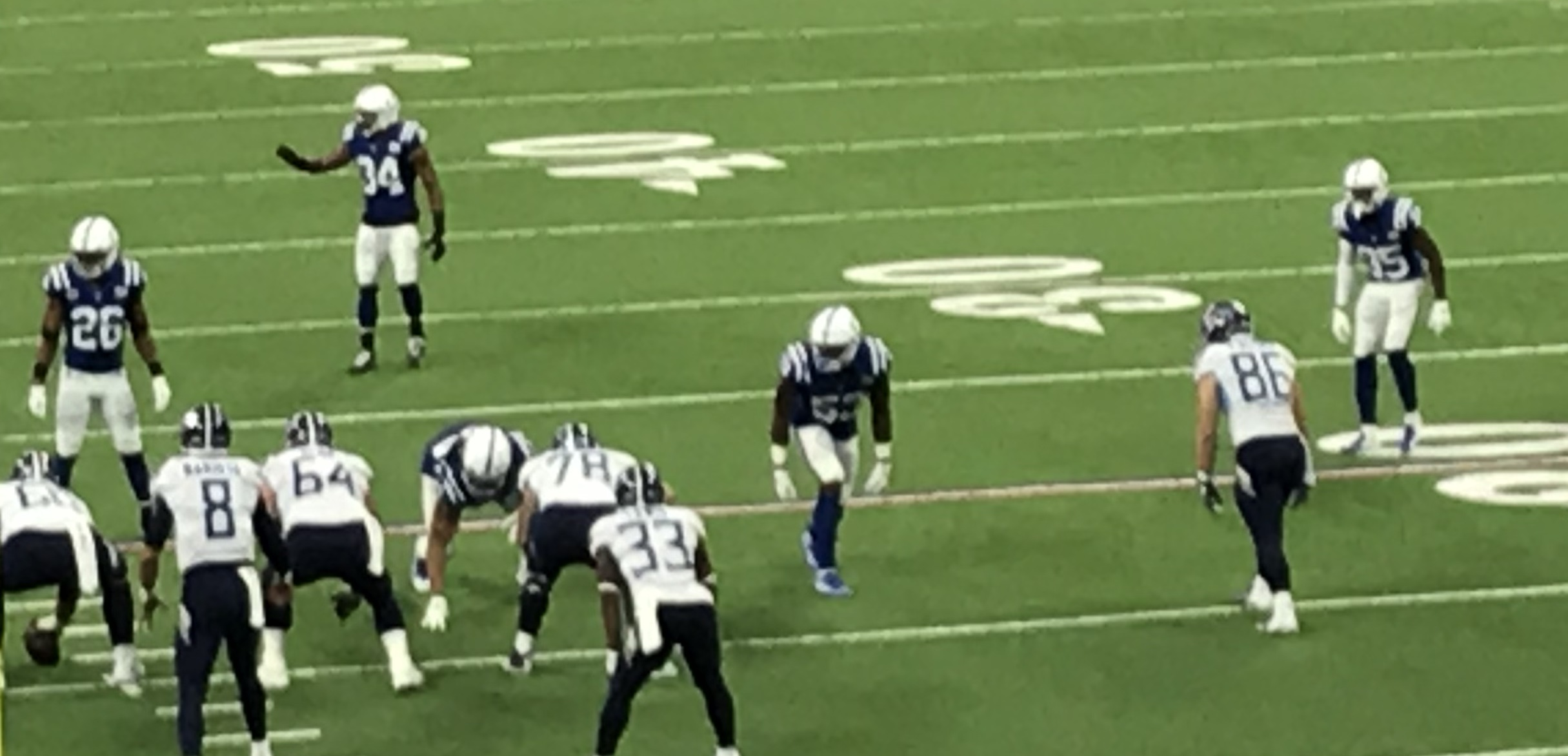
Mitchell (second from left) in a game against the Tennessee Titans in November 2018.

Mitchell signed with the Indianapolis Colts on October 9, 2018. In his second game with the team in Week 7, he recorded seven tackles, one interception, and two passes defensed in a 37–5 win over the Buffalo Bills, earning him AFC Defensive Player of the Week. In the wild card round of the playoffs against the Houston Texans, Mitchell suffered a calf strain and was placed on injured reserve on January 9, 2019.

== NFL career statistics ==
Legend
**Bold**	Career high

=== Regular season ===
Year	Team	Games		Tackles					Interceptions					Fumbles			
Year	Team	GP	GS	Cmb	Solo	Ast	Sck	TFL	Int	Yds	TD	Lng	PD	FF	FR	Yds	TD
2009	OAK	**16**	0	16	11	5	1.5	1	0	0	0	0	0	0	**2**	0	0
2010	OAK	**16**	3	51	41	10	0.0	**4**	1	0	0	0	5	1	**2**	**12**	0
2011	OAK	13	4	31	22	9	1.0	1	1	0	0	0	5	0	0	0	0
2012	OAK	**16**	2	41	32	9	1.0	2	0	0	0	0	0	0	0	0	0
2013	CAR	15	14	66	50	16	**4.0**	**4**	**4**	**63**	0	38	8	**2**	0	0	0
2014	PIT	**16**	**16**	71	53	18	0.0	0	0	0	0	0	3	**2**	0	0	0
2015	PIT	**16**	**16**	**80**	**58**	**22**	0.0	0	3	16	0	9	**9**	**2**	**2**	0	0
2016	PIT	**16**	**16**	77	55	**22**	0.0	0	1	26	0	26	**9**	0	1	0	0
2017	PIT	13	13	53	35	18	0.0	1	0	0	0	0	2	0	1	0	0
2018	IND	8	4	28	22	6	0.0	0	1	47	0	**47**	1	**2**	0	0	0
Career		145	88	514	379	135	7.5	13	11	152	0	47	42	9	8	12	0

=== Playoffs ===
Year	Team	Games		Tackles					Interceptions					Fumbles			
Year	Team	GP	GS	Cmb	Solo	Ast	Sck	TFL	Int	Yds	TD	Lng	PD	FF	FR	Yds	TD
2013	CAR	1	1	5	2	3	0.0	0	0	0	0	0	**1**	0	0	0	0
2014	PIT	1	1	5	2	3	0.0	0	0	0	0	0	0	0	0	0	0
2015	PIT	2	2	6	3	3	0.0	0	0	0	0	0	**1**	0	0	0	0
2016	PIT	**3**	**3**	**18**	**8**	**10**	**1.0**	0	0	0	0	0	0	**1**	0	0	0
2017	PIT	1	1	5	4	1	0.0	0	0	0	0	0	0	0	0	0	0
2018	IND	1	0	2	2	0	0.0	0	0	0	0	0	0	0	0	0	0
Career		9	8	41	21	20	1.0	0	0	0	0	0	2	1	0	0	0
