= Benjamin Guidugli =

American football player (born 1987)

Ben Guidugli
No. 41
- Position: Fullback

Personal information
- Born: October 22, 1987 (age 39); Fort Thomas, Kentucky, U.S.
- Listed height: 6 ft 1 in (1.85 m)
- Listed weight: 242 lb (110 kg)

Career information
- High school: Fort Thomas (KY) Highlands
- College: Cincinnati
- NFL draft: 2011: undrafted

Career history
- St. Louis Rams (2011); New York Giants (2013)*
- * Offseason or practice squad member only

Awards and highlights
- Second-team All-Big East (2010)
- Stats at Pro Football Reference

Benjamin "Ben" Guidugli (born October 22, 1987) is an American former football fullback. He was signed by the St. Louis Rams as an undrafted free agent in 2011. He played college football for the University of Cincinnati.

== Professional career ==
=== St. Louis Rams ===
On July 28, 2011, Guidugli was signed as an undrafted free agent by the St. Louis Rams.

=== New York Giants ===
On August 13, 2013, Guidugli was signed by the New York Giants to replace fullback Ryan D'Imperio, who decided to retire from the NFL. On August 25, 2013, he was cut by the Giants.

== Personal life ==
Guidugli's brothers, Gino, Jeff and Tony, played college football at Cincinnati, Southeastern Louisiana and Georgia Military College, respectively.
