= Gino Guidugli =

American football player and coach (born 1983)

Current position
- Title: Quarterbacks coach, pass game coordinator
- Team: Notre Dame
- Conference: Independent

Biographical details
- Born: March 13, 1983 (age 43); Fort Thomas, Kentucky, U.S.
- Education: Cincinnati

Playing career
- 2001–2004: Cincinnati
- 2005: Tennessee Titans*
- 2007: Green Bay Blizzard
- 2007–2008: BC Lions
- 2008–2009: Green Bay Blizzard
- 2010: Milwaukee Iron
- 2011–2012: Milwaukee Mustangs
- 2013: Chicago Rush
- 2014: San Antonio Talons
- Position: Quarterback

Coaching career (HC unless noted)
- 2010–2012: Central Michigan (GA)
- 2013–2016: Central Michigan (RB)
- 2017: Cincinnati (RB)
- 2018–2021: Cincinnati (QB)
- 2022: Cincinnati (OC/QB)
- 2023–present: Notre Dame (QB)

Accomplishments and honors

Awards
- As player: Second-team All-C-USA (2002)

Gino M. Guidugli (born March 13, 1983) is an American football coach and former quarterback who is the quarterbacks coach and pass game coordinator of the Notre Dame Fighting Irish. He was signed by the Tennessee Titans as an undrafted free agent in 2005. He played college football for the Cincinnati Bearcats.

He is also a former professional Canadian football quarterback. He was one of the backup quarterbacks with the Canadian Football League's BC Lions before being cut by the team following their 2008 training camp. He re-joined the Green Bay Blizzard of af2 for the end of the 2008 season, including the playoffs. He then played in the Arena Football League.

== Early life ==
Guidugli played at Highlands High School in Fort Thomas, Kentucky. He led Highlands to two state championships in 1999 and 2000 and he also was a backup when Highlands won state in 1998. He still holds many Kentucky records for quarterbacks. He also excelled on the basketball court. He led his basketball team to the Kentucky sweet sixteen his senior season with a buzzer beating shot against Covington Holmes.

== College career ==
Guidugli played collegiately at the University of Cincinnati from 2001 to 2004. He owns most of the school's passing and total offense records. He is ranked 29th for all-time yards and offense of all NCAA division I A FBS schools by a quarterback. He finished his career with 11,453 yards on 880 of 1,556 passes (56.6%) and 78 touchdowns. He also rushed for 208 yards and scored five times on 235 carries.

== Professional career ==
Guidugli was rated the 18th best quarterback in the 2005 NFL draft by NFLDraftScout.com.

Pre-draft measurables
Height	Weight	40-yard dash	10-yard split	20-yard split	20-yard shuttle	Three-cone drill	Vertical jump	Broad jump	Wonderlic
6 ft 4 in (1.93 m)	229 lb (104 kg)	5.07 s	1.74 s	2.93 s	4.52 s	7.41 s	29 in (0.74 m)	8 ft 7 in (2.62 m)	30
All values from NFL Combine

Guidugli went unselected in the 2005 NFL Draft. He was later signed by the Tennessee Titans, but he was ultimately released. He later joined the Green Bay Blizzard of the af2, leading the Blizzard to the af2 playoffs.

He signed a free agent contract with the BC Lions of the Canadian Football League on July 23, 2007, following injuries to starting quarterback Dave Dickenson and backup Buck Pierce. He played in 11 games in 2007, completing 6 of 11 passes for 138 yards, 1 touchdown and 1 interception. He was released by the Lions following their 2008 training camp after losing the job as third-string quarterback to rookie Zac Champion.

Guidugli signed with the Milwaukee Iron on January 2, 2010, but was placed on the "Refused to Report" list and did not play with the team.

Guidugli signed with the Milwaukee Mustangs on June 10, 2011. He was reunited with former Green Bay Blizzard coaches Bob Landsee, Mark Stoute, and Cedric Walker. When they signed Gino the Mustangs were 4–8, he went on to start 5 games for the Mustangs and went 3–2, but the 2 losses were by 1 point and 4 points.

== Career statistics ==
Legend
	Led the league
**Bold**	Career high

=== AFL ===
Year	Team	Passing							Rushing		
Year	Team	Cmp	Att	Pct	Yds	TD	Int	Rtg	Att	Yds	TD
2011	Milwaukee	107	158	**67.7**	1,276	23	4	**118.01**	11	30	2
2012	Milwaukee	**373**	**587**	63.5	**4,872**	**86**	**25**	108.50	**46**	**93**	**18**
Career		480	745	64.4	6,148	109	29	110.52	57	123	20

=== College ===
Year	Team	Games			Passing								Rushing			
Year	Team	GP	GS	Record	Cmp	Att	Pct	Yds	Avg	TD	Int	Rtg	Att	Yds	Avg	TD
2001	Cincinnati	11	10	**6−4**	185	317	58.4	2,573	**8.1**	16	9	137.5	47	-75	-1.6	1
2002	Cincinnati	**14**	**14**	7−7	258	472	54.7	**3,543**	7.5	22	**21**	124.2	69	27	0.4	**3**
2003	Cincinnati	12	12	5−7	**227**	**425**	53.4	2,704	6.4	14	10	113.0	**76**	**166**	**2.2**	0
2004	Cincinnati	11	11	6−5	210	342	**61.4**	2,633	7.7	**26**	8	**146.5**	43	90	2.1	1
Career		47	47	24−23	880	1,556	56.6	11,453	7.4	78	48	128.8	235	208	0.9	5

== Coaching career ==
Guidugli was introduced as the running backs coach for Central Michigan University on March 11, 2013. He replaced Kort Shankweiler, who left for the tight ends and tackles coaching job at Florida International under his father, Steve, who was the new offensive line coach for FIU. In January 2017, Guidugli was promoted to offensive coordinator/quarterbacks coach.

On March 4, 2017, Cincinnati officially announced that Guidugli was hired as running backs coach. For the 2018 season, Guidugli was named the quarterbacks coach for the Bearcats. For the 2020 season, Guidugli was named the Passing Game Coordinator.

On January 17, 2022 The Athletic reported that Guidugli would be promoted to offensive coordinator, after Mike Denbrock left for LSU.

After Luke Fickell left Cincinnati to become the head coach at Wisconsin, Guidugli followed Fickell to Madison as the passing game coordinator and tight ends coach. However, in February 2023 Guidugli would be named the quarterbacks coach at Notre Dame after Tommy Rees left for Alabama.

== Personal ==
Guidugli has three brothers, former NFL and University of Cincinnati player Ben, Tony, who played at Georgia Military College, and Bay, who played at Southeastern Louisiana University.

== See also ==
- List of Division I FBS passing yardage leaders
