= William E. L. Bunn =

American artist (1910–2009)

William E. L. Bunn (1910–2009) was an American artist.

He was born in 1910 in Muscatine, Iowa. He studied with Grant Wood, and received bachelor's and master's degrees from the University of Iowa. During the 1930s, he received commissions for post office murals throughout the Midwest, awarded by the Section of Painting and Sculpture.

Works include:

- Mural at the Minden United States Post Office (NRHP-listed) completed in 1939.
- Mural at United States Post Office and Courthouse (Dubuque, Iowa) (NRHP-listed contributing building)
- Mural at the Hickman, Kentucky, post office, NRHP-listed contributing building in Old Hickman Historic District, Hickman, Kentucky
- Mural at the Hamburg, Iowa post office

== See also ==
- List of post office murals
