= Adam P. Symson =

American median executive (born 1974)

Adam Symson
- Born: 1974 (age 51–52)
- Education: University of California, Los Angeles (BA)
- Spouse: Sherri Symson
- Children: 2 daughters

Adam P. Symson (born 1974) is an American media executive. He is president and chief executive officer of the E. W. Scripps Company, a mass media corporation.

== Early life ==
Symson was born in 1974. He graduated from the University of California, Los Angeles (UCLA) with a bachelor's degree in Communications.

== Career ==
Symson began his career as an investigative producer for two television stations owned by CBS: WBBM-TV and KCBS-TV. He joined the E. W. Scripps Company in 2002. He first worked for KNXV-TV, and he was chief digital officer from 2011 to 2016, followed by chief operating officer from November 2016 to August 8, 2017.

Symson succeeded Rich Boehne as chief executive officer on August 8, 2017. He was also appointed to its board of directors in 2017. As CEO, he has focused transforming the company by reducing payroll, selling radio stations, expanding into national media and purchasing more local television stations. He earned over $3.4 million in 2018.

Under Symson's CEOship, E.W. Scripps spent $2.65 billion to purchase Ion Media in 2020, backed by a $600 million investment by Berkshire Hathaway. Scripps sold podcast company Stitcher to SiriusXM for $325 million and then sold Triton Digital, an audio ad-tech company to iHeartMedia for $230 million.

In 2022, E.W. Scripps further expanded under Symson's leadership after it began acquiring local sports broadcast rights and created the Scripps Sports division to secure rights to broadcast athletic events on ION and Scripps networks. The acquisition was rapidly followed by licensing deals with the WNBA and the National Women's Soccer League (NWSL).

In February 2026, Symson announced cost-cutting measures and the integration of AI technology to increase revenue. "This will essentially be a reorienting of the entire company ... with a much more agile and efficient cost structure," Symson told CNBC.

E.W. Scripps board of directors approved a new contract for Symson in 2020 to extend his contract through 2027. However, in February 2026, the board extended that contract to December 31, 2029, replacing his previous agreement.

== Personal life ==
With his wife Sherri, Symson has two daughters.

== Board affiliations ==
Symsons serves on the boards of directors for Cincinnati's Holocaust & Humanity Center, the Reporters Committee for the Freedom of the Press and The Jewish Foundation of Cincinnati. He is also on the USC Annenberg Center on Communication Leadership and Policy Advisory board
