= John Schlarman =

American football coach (1975–2020)

Profile
- Positions: Center, left guard

Personal information
- Born: May 1, 1975; Fort Thomas, Kentucky, U.S.
- Died: November 12, 2020 (aged 45); Lexington, Kentucky, U.S.

Career information
- High school: Fort Thomas (KY) Highlands
- College: Kentucky

Career history
- Kentucky (2000–2002) Offensive line coach; Troy (2007–2012) Assistant; Kentucky (2012–2020) Offensive line coach

Awards and highlights
- As a coach: 2020 Herald-Leader Kentucky Sports Figure of the Year; As a player: First-team All-SEC (1997); SEC All-Freshman Team (1994)

John Schlarman (May 1, 1975 – November 12, 2020) was an American football offensive line coach from 2013 to 2020 for the Kentucky Wildcats football team, as well as from 2000 to 2002. He also coached the offensive line for the Troy Trojans football team from 2007 to 2012. In early August 2018, Schlarman was diagnosed with stage 4 cholangiocarcinoma, a rare form of cancer in the bile ducts. Schlarman died in 2020, after succumbing to his condition at the age of 45.

== Early life ==
Schlarman attended Highlands High School in his hometown of Fort Thomas, Kentucky. At Highlands, Schlarman played varsity football in all four high school years. He played offensive and defensive line for Highlands, for which he was named with All-State and 1st-team honors in his junior and senior years. In Schlarman's senior year, he captained Highlands to a 14–1 record and the 1992 Kentucky AAA championship game, for which he was named the team's MVP.

In addition to football, Schlarman participated in the school's varsity track and field program for two years. As a senior, Schlarman captained the track and field team and was 2A State runner-up in shot put. He was named the most valuable player on the team, giving him a spot on the Northern Kentucky All-Star team for track and field. After graduating from Highlands in 1993, Schlarman committed to play college football for Kentucky.
