= Highlands High School (Kentucky) =

Public school in Kentucky, US

Location
- 2400 Memorial Parkway; Fort Thomas, Kentucky 41075; United States; 39°05′02″N 84°27′01″W

Information
- Type: Public secondary school
- Established: 1888; 138 years ago
- School district: Fort Thomas Independent Schools
- Superintendent: Brian Robinson
- Principal: John Darnell
- Teaching staff: 58.40 (FTE)
- Grades: 9–12
- Enrollment: 1,019 (2024–2025)
- Student to teacher ratio: 17.45
- Colors: Blue and white
- Mascot: Bluebirds
- Rival: Covington Catholic High School
- USNWR ranking: 865 (2025)
- Newspaper: The Hilltopper
- Yearbook: The Highlander Yearbook
- Website: www.fortthomas.kyschools.us/o/hhs

Fort Thomas Highlands High School, also known as Fort Thomas Highlands or Highlands High School, is a public secondary school located in Fort Thomas, Kentucky. It is the sole high school for Fort Thomas Independent Schools. Enrollment for the 2024–25 school year was 1,019 in grades 9-12.

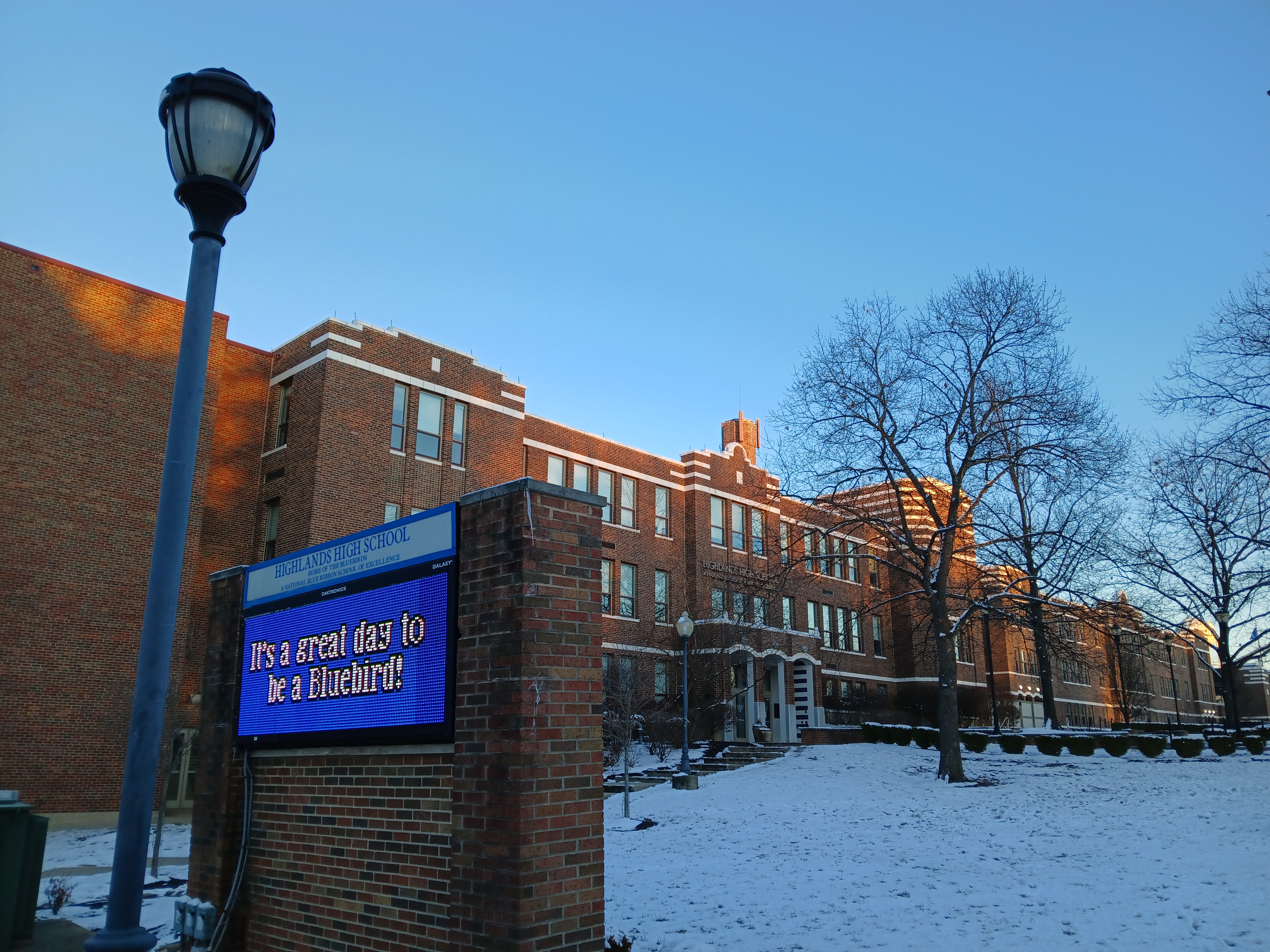
Highlands High School in Fort Thomas, Kentucky

== History ==
Highlands High School was founded in 1888, replacing Highlands Central School. In 1891, the first graduating class consisted of four students. A new high school was built in 1914, but was destroyed in a fire in 1962. The current building was built in 1936 adjacent to the old building. The school took its name from the original name of Fort Thomas, "The Highlands."

== Awards and recognition ==
In 2025, U.S. News & World Report ranked Highlands as the 876th best high school in the United States and 6th best in Kentucky. According to the Kentucky Department of Education report card for 2024–25, the school ranked as blue, the highest of 5 possible color categories, overall and in each metric listed.

The school was named a 2007 No Child Left Behind Blue Ribbon School, the highest award that can be given to a school by the US Department of Education and received a national "High Schools That Work" Gold Achievement Award in 2008.

The Washington Post named Highlands the number one most challenging school in Kentucky in 2014.

== Extracurricular Activities ==
=== Athletics ===
The school's nickname was "the Devils" until the 1930s, when the sports teams were renamed "the Bluebirds" due to public outrage from local churches concerning the use of "Devils."

The Highlands Bluebirds football team won their 23rd state title in 2014, the second-most among Kentucky high school football teams. As of 2024, Highlands holds the state records for most consecutive state football championships with six in a row from 2007 to 2012, and in number of undefeated seasons at 13. Highlands is also ranked fifth nationally, and first in the state, in all-time wins with 943 as of 2024. The girls' soccer team won back to back state championships in 2005 and 2006, and the boys' soccer team was state runner-up in 2008. The girls' cross country team won four consecutive state championships from 2012 to 2015 and three consecutive from 1978 to 1980 and again from 2002 to 2004. and the girls' track team also won state in 2009. Highlands has 51 state titles across all sports.

== Notable alumni ==
- Rich Boehne – American media executive
- Jac Collinsworth - Sportscaster
- Gino Guidugli – AFL player, coach
- Ben Guidugli – NFL player
- Chuck Kyle – CFL player
- Jared Lorenzen – NFL player
- Mike Mitchell – NFL player
- Marty Moore – NFL player
- Arquimides Ordoñez - Professional Soccer Player
- Jerry Reynolds – NFL player
- Homer Rice – NFL coach
- Drew Rom - MLB Player
- John Schlarman – Kentucky Wildcats football Player, NCAA football coach
- Derek Smith – NFL player
- Rob Smith – NFL player
- Patrick Towles - Football player
- Jeff Walz – Louisville Cardinals women's basketball coach
