= Rich Boehne =

American media executive

- Education: Highlands High School; Northern Kentucky University
- Occupation: Media executive
- Known for: CEO of the E.W. Scripps Company (2008-2017); chairman of the E.W. Scripps Company (2013-ongoing)

Rich Boehne (born 1958) is an American media executive. He is the chairman of the board of the E.W. Scripps Company, and its former president and chief executive officer.

== Education ==
Boehne was born in 1958. He studied at Highlands High School in Kentucky. He has a bachelor's in communication and journalism from the Northern Kentucky University (NKU), by whom he was described as “one of [their] most successful alumni.

== Career ==
Boehne started his career selling subscriptions for The Cincinnati Post, while he was in high school. Having graduated school, he worked at The Cincinnati Enquirer as a part-time reporter. Once he had his bachelor's degree, he joined a chain of community newspapers, where he progressed while Suburban Communications (the company owner) bought and consolidated various Midwestern family-owned publications.

Boehne started working at Scripps in 1988 in the capacity of manager of investor relations and a year later, executive vice president. He soon after became director of communication efforts for the firm, simultaneously participating in the group that worked on the company's long-term strategic planning and development. In 1995 he became a vice president.

Boehne was appointed as the chief executive officer of E.W. Scripps in 2008. He became chairman of the board in 2013, taking over from Nackey Scagliotti who had held the position for five years. Boehne was succeeded as president and CEO by Adam P. Symson on August 8, 2017.

== Board memberships ==
Boehne sits on the board of directors of the Associated Press, Cincinnati's external advisory board at Deloitte & Touche, the board of regents at Northern Kentucky University and is a director of Cincinnati's Freestore Foodbank. He is chairman of the advisory board of the Cincinnati USA Regional Chamber of Commerce's (where in the past he held the role of chairman) Agenda 360 Regional Planning Organization.

== Philanthropy ==
Scripps donated $1 million in Boehne's name to the Scripps Howard Foundation in 2014.
