= Minden United States Post Office =

- U.S. Post Office-Minden
- U.S. National Register of Historic Places
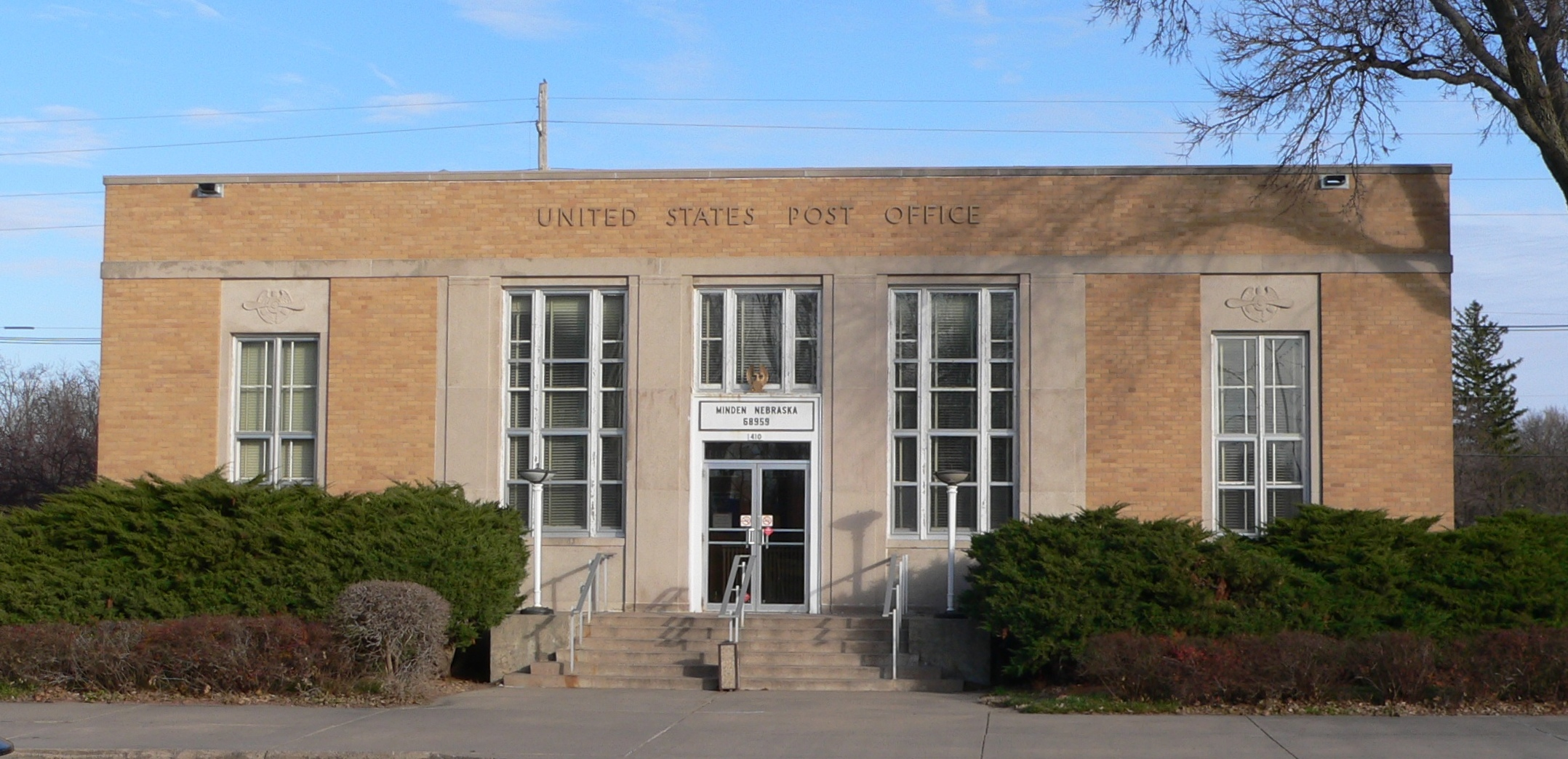
- The building in 2009

- Location within Nebraska Location within the United States
- Location: 410 North Minden Street, Minden, Nebraska
- Coordinates: 40°29′55″N 98°56′49″W
- Area: less than one acre
- Built: 1939
- Artist: William E. L. Bunn
- Architectural style: Modernist
- MPS: Nebraska Post Offices Which Contain Section Artwork MPS
- NRHP reference No.: 92000471
- Added to NRHP: May 11, 1992

The Minden United States Post Office is a historic building in Minden, Nebraska. It was built in 1936–1937, and designed in the Modernistic style by architect William E. L. Bunn. Inside, there is a 13 by 6 feet (4.0 m × 1.8 m) Works Progress Administration mural in memory of 1848 Fort Kearny, completed in 1939 by artist William E. L. Bunn. The building was listed on the National Register of Historic Places in 1992 as U.S. Post Office-Minden.
