= Confederate Memorial Gateway in Hickman =

- U.S. National Register of Historic Places
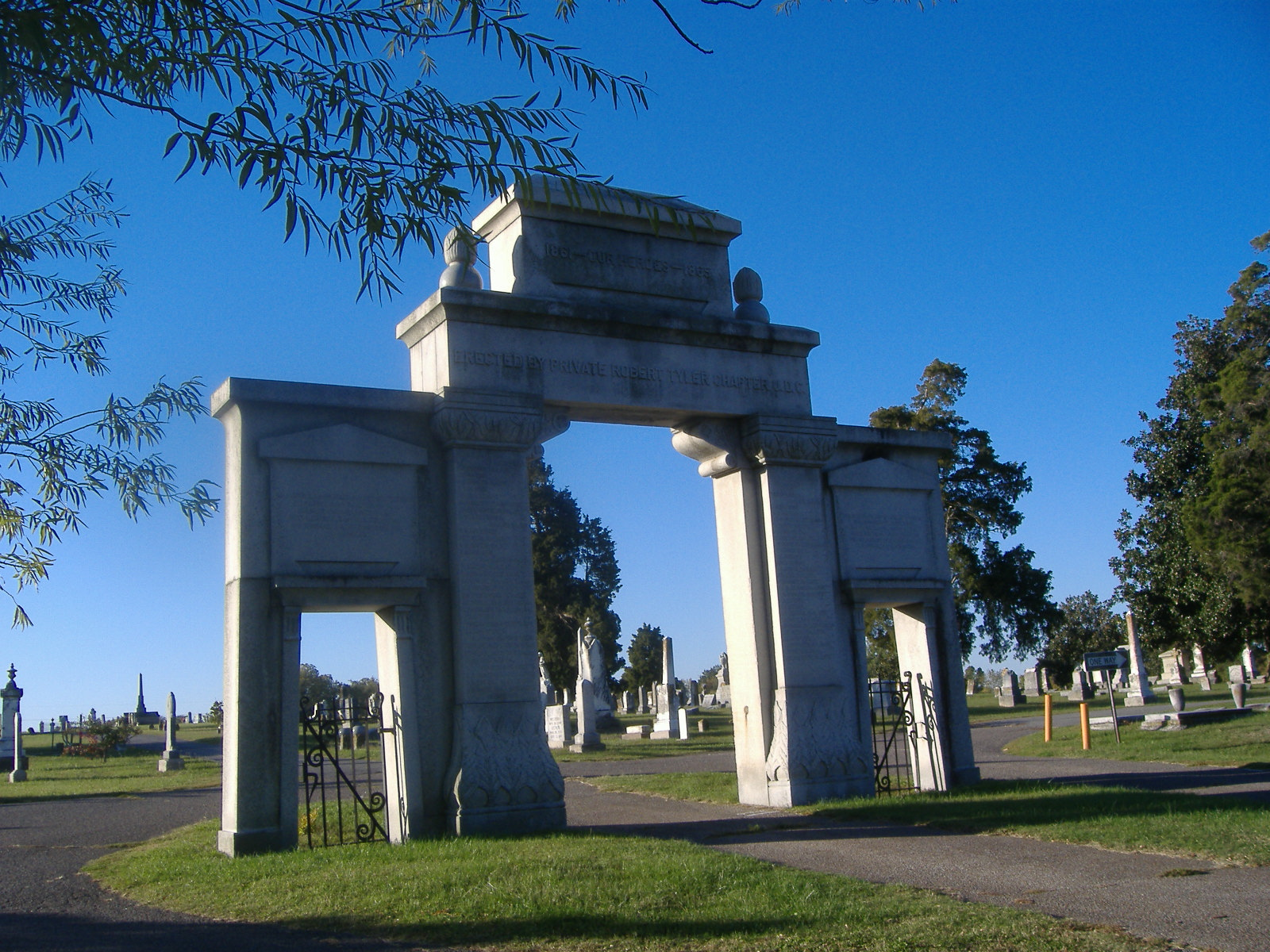

- Location within Kentucky Location within the United States
- Location: Hickman City Cemetery. 0.5 mi. S of jct. of Ky 125 and KY 199, Hickman, Kentucky
- Built: 1913
- Architect: Sir Moses Ezekiel, McNeal Marble Co., Marietta, GA
- MPS: Civil War Monuments of Kentucky MPS
- NRHP reference No.: 97000700
- Added to NRHP: July 17, 1997

The Confederate Memorial Gateway in Hickman, Kentucky is a historic cemetery gateway in Fulton County, Kentucky. It was funded in 1913 by the Private Robert Tyler Chapter of the United Daughters of the Confederacy. It was placed on the National Register of Historic Places in 1997.

== Hickman ==
Due to its presence on the Mississippi River, Hickman was placed at a strategic point, and was held by both sides during the American Civil War. It was strongly pro-Confederate during the war, but after the Confederates lost control of the county in 1862, it saw occasional raids by Confederate cavalry.

== Description ==
The Memorial Gateway was designed by Sir Moses Ezekiel, and built by the NcNeal Marble Company of Marietta, Georgia. It took ten years and $10,000 (equivalent to $326,000 in 2025} to construct the granite structure. The back is solid granite and the front has ornamentation. The names of seventy Confederate soldiers are carved on the hoods of the structure. It has a center opening for vehicles, and two side openings for pedestrians. The inscription on its capstone reads: "1861 - Our Heroes - 1865". Due to its size and how long after the war it was built, it was meant more to celebrate the Confederate States of America instead of mourning it, even though it was built in a cemetery.

== National Register of Historic Places ==
On July 17, 1997, it was one of sixty-one different monuments to the Civil War in Kentucky placed on the National Register of Historic Places, as part of the Civil War Monuments of Kentucky Multiple Property Submission. The only other monument on the list that are gateways are the Confederate Memorial Gates in Mayfield. One other monument on the list is in Fulton County: the Confederate Memorial in Fulton, located twenty miles to the east in Fulton, Kentucky.

== Gallery ==
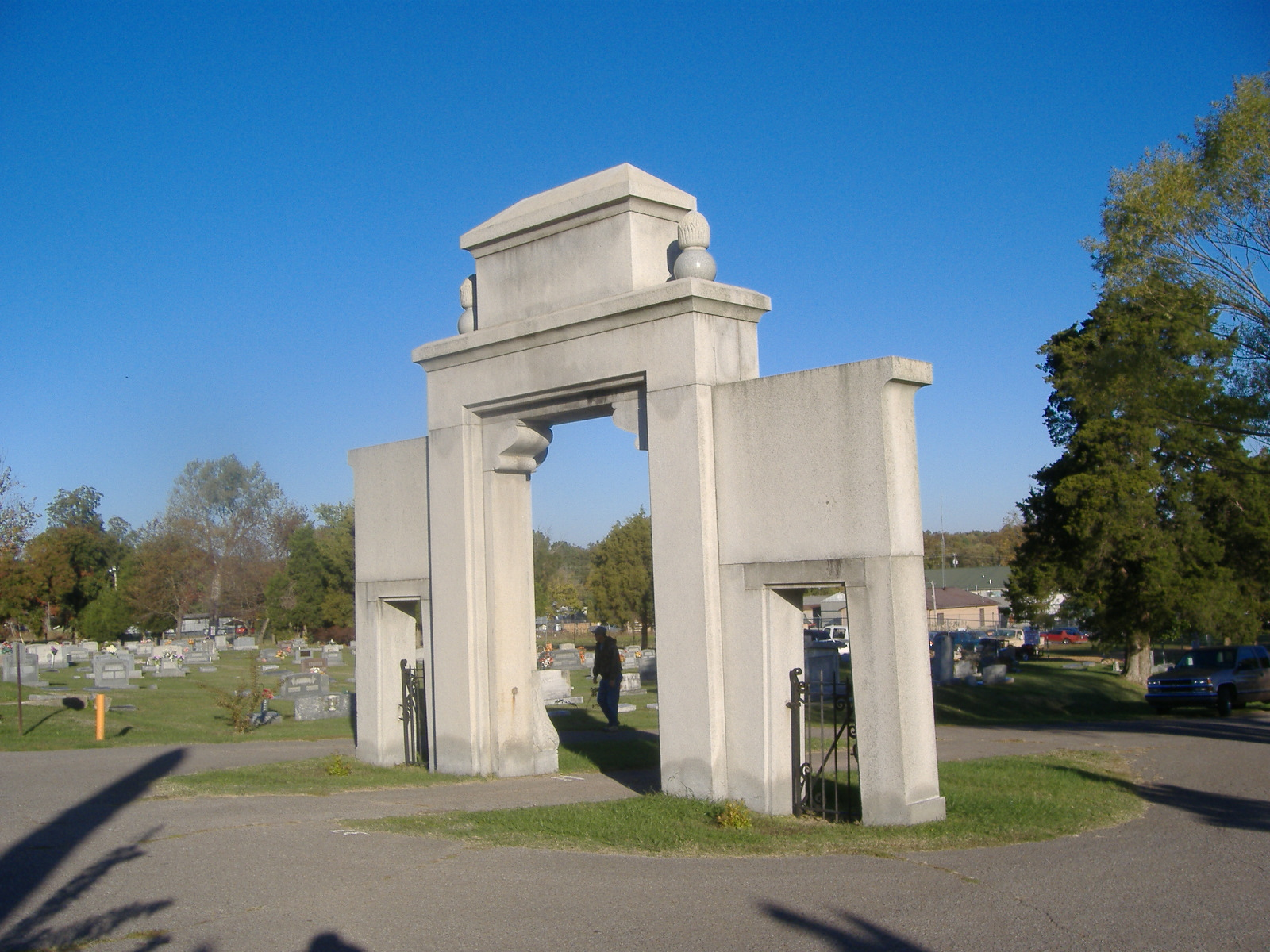
Back of gateway

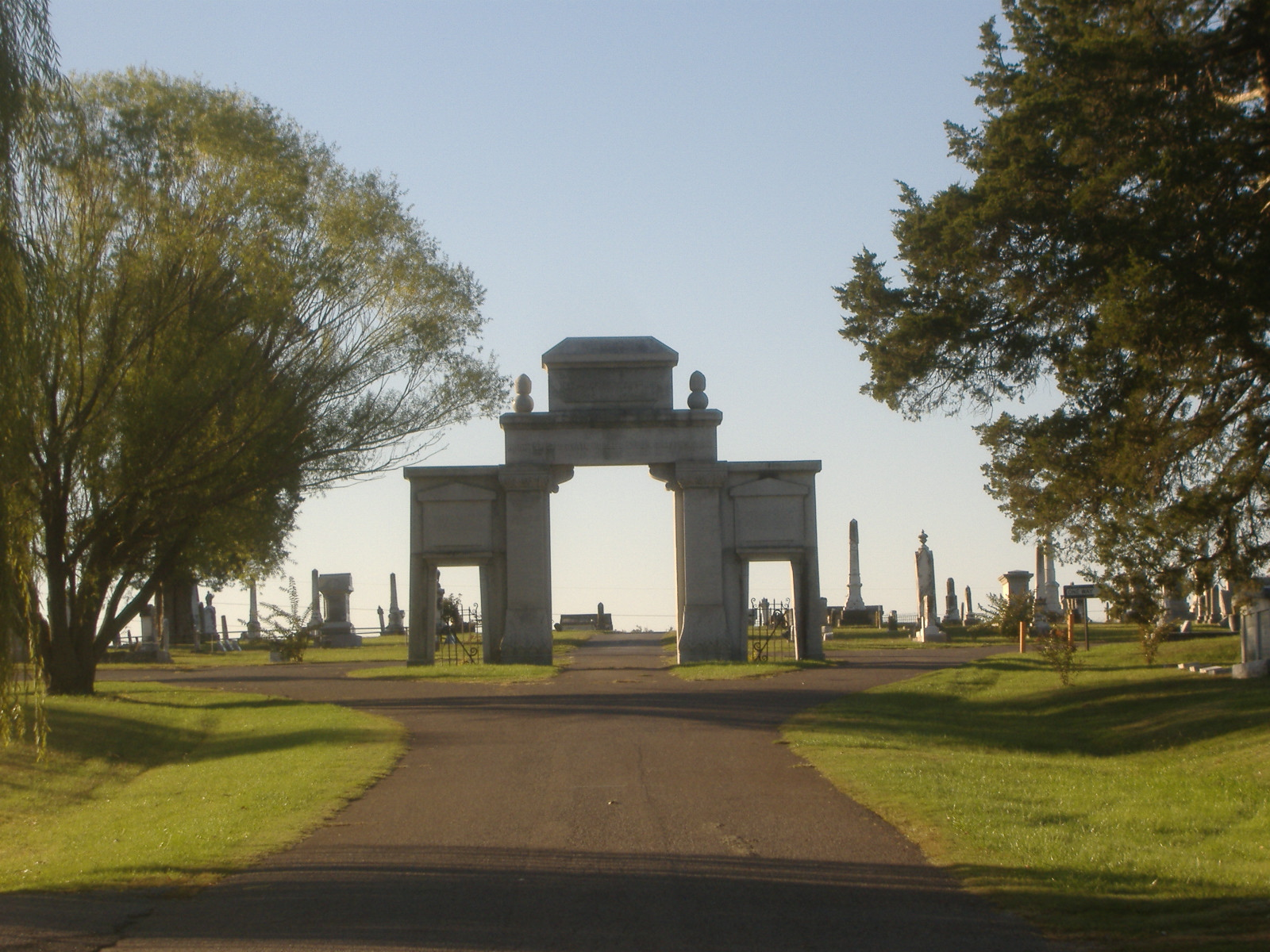
Far view of gateway
