= D. J. Campbell (safety) =

American football player (born 1989)

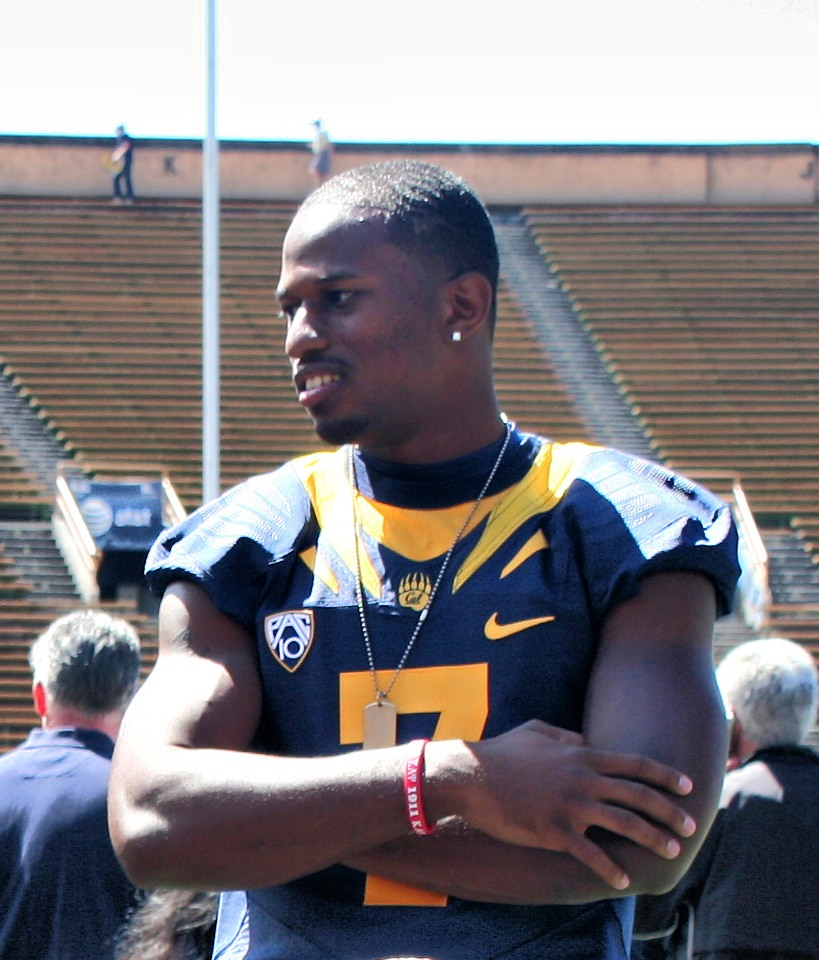
- Campbell during his time at California, 2010

No. 26, 37
- Position: Safety

Personal information
- Born: July 24, 1989 (age 37); Las Vegas, Nevada, U.S.
- Listed height: 6 ft 0 in (1.83 m)
- Listed weight: 205 lb (93 kg)

Career information
- High school: Cheyenne (North Las Vegas, Nevada)
- College: California
- NFL draft: 2012: 7th round, 216th overall pick

Career history
- Carolina Panthers (2012); Miami Dolphins (2013); San Francisco 49ers (2014)*; Arizona Cardinals (2015)*
- * Offseason or practice squad member only

Career NFL statistics
- Total tackles: 122
- Pass deflections: 87
- Stats at Pro Football Reference

Darion Lamar Campbell Jr. (born July 24, 1989) is an American former professional football player who was a safety in the National Football League (NFL). He played college football for the California Golden Bears, and was selected by the Carolina Panthers in the seventh round of the 2012 NFL draft. He was also a member of the Miami Dolphins, San Francisco 49ers, and Arizona Cardinals.

== Early life ==
Campbell played high school basketball and football at Cheyenne High School in North Las Vegas, Nevada, where he was a two-time first-team All-State selection in the latter sport. As a senior cornerback, Campbell led his team with 61 tackles and had eight interceptions, including four returned for touchdowns. He was ranked by Rivals.com as the No. 3 prospect in the state.

== College career ==
Campbell played college football at the University of California, Berkeley, after also receiving 39 scholarship offers from schools such as Arizona State, Fresno State, Nevada, UNLV and UTEP. In four seasons with the Golden Bears, Campbell started 14 of 46 games played and totaled 110 tackles (4.5 for a loss), two sacks, two interceptions, seven pass breakups, one forced fumbles and four fumble recoveries.

After being named Scout Team Player of the Year while redshirting in 2007, Campbell played in 23 games during his first two seasons and totaled 18 tackles. He had 21 tackles in 12 games as a junior in 2010, making his first career start at Washington State.

Campbell became a full-time starter at safety as a senior in 2011, opening all 13 contests and recording 71 tackles and two interceptions in his way to being named an honorable mention All-Pac-12.

== Professional career ==
=== Pre-draft ===
Pre-draft measurables
Height	Weight	40-yard dash	10-yard split	20-yard split	20-yard shuttle	Three-cone drill	Vertical jump	Broad jump	Bench press
6 ft 0 1/8 in (1.83 m)	201 lb (91 kg)	4.51 s	1.63 s	2.57 s	4.22 s	7.08 s	38.0 in (0.97 m)	10 ft 7 in (3.23 m)	22 reps
All values from Pro Day

Prior to the 2012 NFL draft, Campbell ran a 4.51 40-yard dash and posted a 38-inch vertical leap at Cal's Pro Day. His 22 bench press reps of 225 pounds would have tied for first among safeties at the 2012 NFL Scouting Combine. Projected by Pro Football Weekly as a late-round pick, Campbell had a pre-draft visit with the Dallas Cowboys visit in April.

=== Carolina Panthers ===
On April 28, Campbell was selected by the Carolina Panthers in the seventh round (216th overall) of the 2012 NFL draft. He was the Panthers' seventh and final selection of the draft and joined cornerback Josh Norman as one of two defensive backs selected by the team.

Campbell agreed to terms on a four-year contract with the Panthers on May 10, 2012. As a rookie, he was inactive for the first 11 regular season contests of the year, but ended up starting four of the final five games at strong safety due to an injury to Charles Godfrey. The Panthers won each of his starts, ending the season on a four-game winning streak as Campbell finished his rookie campaign with 12 tackled and a pass defensed.

In 2013, Campbell lost a competition for the Panthers' starting strong safety job to Mike Mitchell during the preseason and eventually landed on injured reserve with a leg injury. He was waived with an injury settlement on September 9, making him a free agent.

=== Miami Dolphins ===
The Miami Dolphins signed Campbell to their practice squad on October 18, 2013. On November 11, he was promoted to the active roster to replace waived safety Jordan Kovacs prior to the Dolphins' Monday Night Football meeting with the Tampa Bay Buccaneers.

=== San Francisco 49ers ===
Campbell signed a one-year contract with the San Francisco 49ers on January 7, 2014. The 49ers waived Campbell on August 25, 2014.

=== Arizona Cardinals ===
On February 4, 2015, Campbell was signed by the Arizona Cardinals. On August 11, 2015, he was released by the Cardinals.

== Personal life ==
Campbell has an older sister and a younger brother. When he was six years old, his 27-year-old mother, Deborah, suffered a fatal gunshot wound. As a result of the killing, his father, Darion Sr., was convicted of involuntary manslaughter and served 13 years in prison and his uncle, Uricos, was convicted of second-degree murder. Campbell, Jr. and his two siblings later lived with his aunt, Valencia, and his uncle.

Campbell considers himself an Atlanta Braves fan, which stems from memories of his later mother. He majored in social welfare at California, Berkeley.
