= Thomas Chapel C.M.E. Church =

Historic church in Kentucky, United States

- U.S. National Register of Historic Places
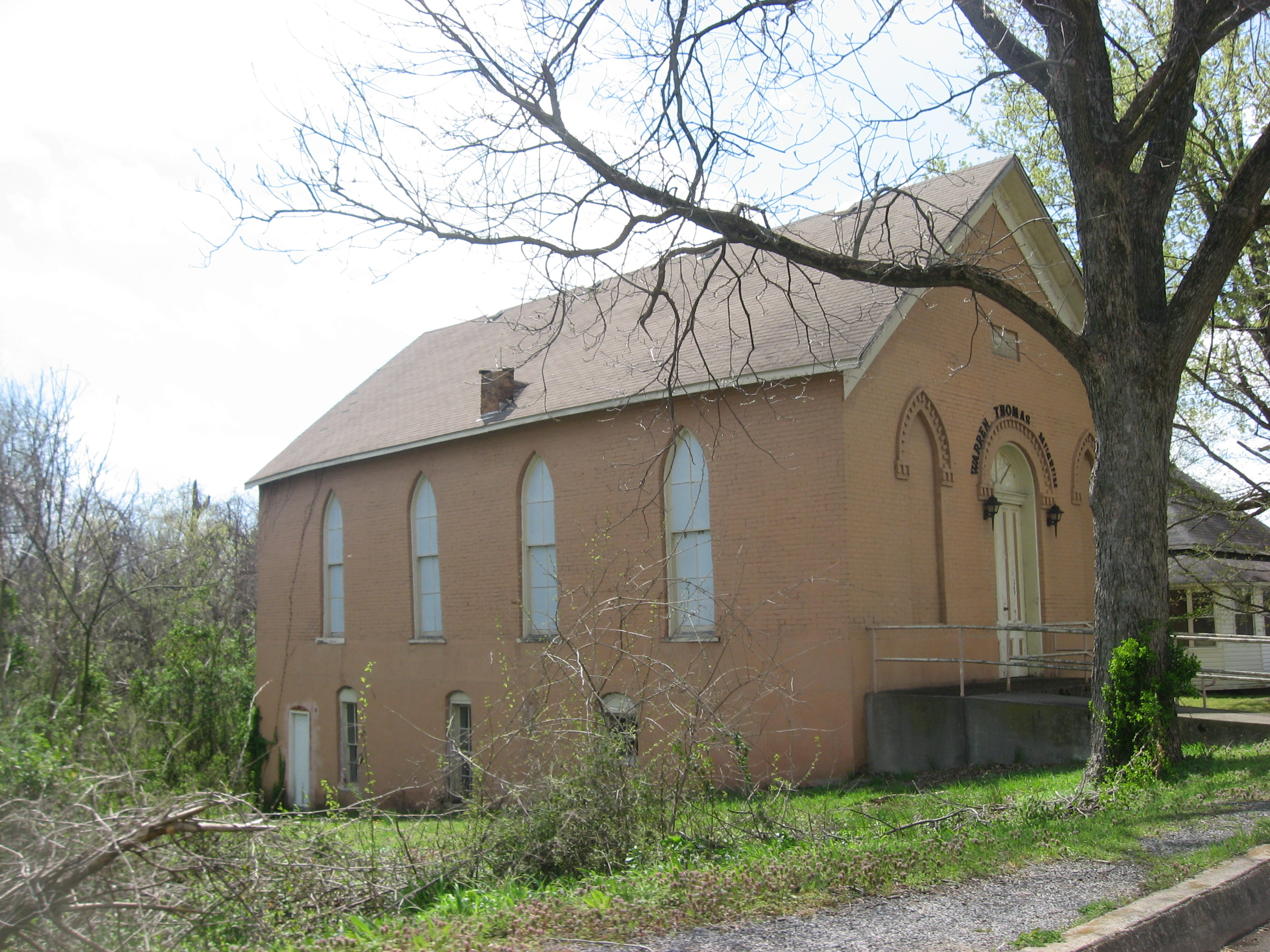
- Streetside view

- Location within Kentucky
- Location: Moscow Avenue; Hickman, Kentucky
- Coordinates: 36°34′17″N 89°11′21″W
- Area: 0.2 acres (0.081 ha)
- Built: 1895
- Built by: Rev. Warren Thomas
- NRHP reference No.: 79000988
- Added to NRHP: January 9, 1979

Thomas Chapel C.M.E. Church is a historic church on Moscow Avenue in Hickman, Kentucky. It is part of the Christian Methodist Episcopal denomination formed in the South after the American Civil War.

On December 16, 1870, in Jackson, Tennessee, 41 freedmen who were former members of the Methodist Episcopal Church, South organized what was then called the Colored Methodist Episcopal Church. (The Methodist Church had split before the war into North and South denominations.) This denomination was composed primarily of African Americans who wanted to have their own churches free of white supervision. In 1954 they changed the name of the denomination to the Christian Methodist Episcopal Church.

This church was built in 1895 and added to the National Register in 1979.

It is a masonry building, built to replace the previous building which was destroyed in a fire. Its reverend, Warren Thomas, was a carpenter and mason.

The church was deemed "important because of the role it played in the early history of education in the black community of Hickman, Kentucky, and the fact that it was the first black church founded in this small western town."
