= Hickman Carnegie Library =

- Carnegie Library
- U.S. National Register of Historic Places
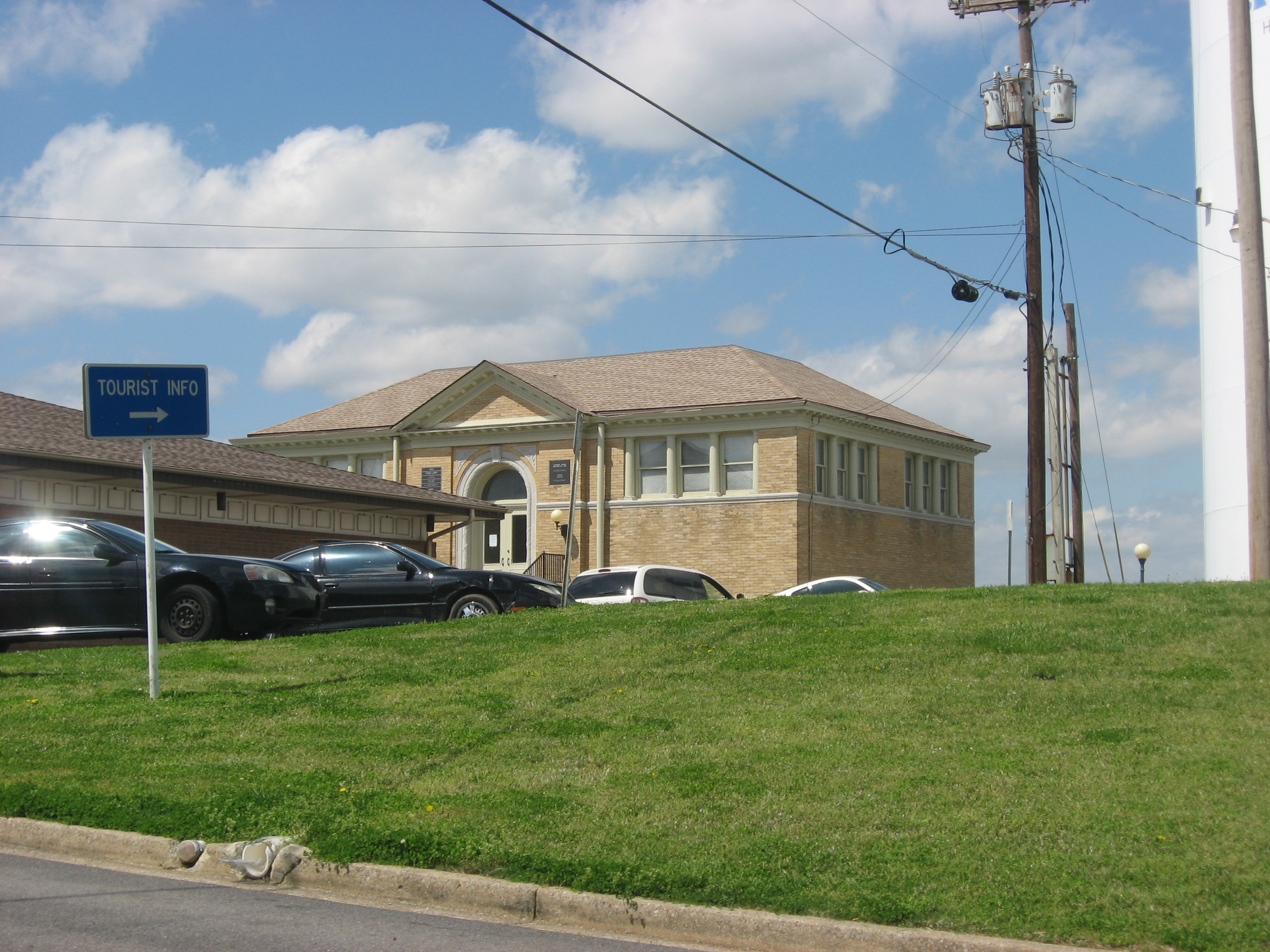
- Seen from Moscow Avenue

- Location within Kentucky Location within the United States
- Location: Moscow Ave. between Troy Ave. and Third St., Hickman, Kentucky
- Coordinates: 36°34′18″N 89°11′7″W
- Area: less than one acre
- Built: 1908
- Built by: Spradling Co.
- Architect: Whitfield & King
- Architectural style: Colonial Revival
- MPS: Hickman, Kentucky MPS
- NRHP reference No.: 90000780
- Added to NRHP: August 3, 1990

The Carnegie Library in Hickman, Kentucky is a Carnegie library building from 1908. It was listed on the National Register of Historic Places in 1990.

It is a one-story brick Colonial Revival-style building.
