= Confederate Memorial in Fulton =

- U.S. National Register of Historic Places
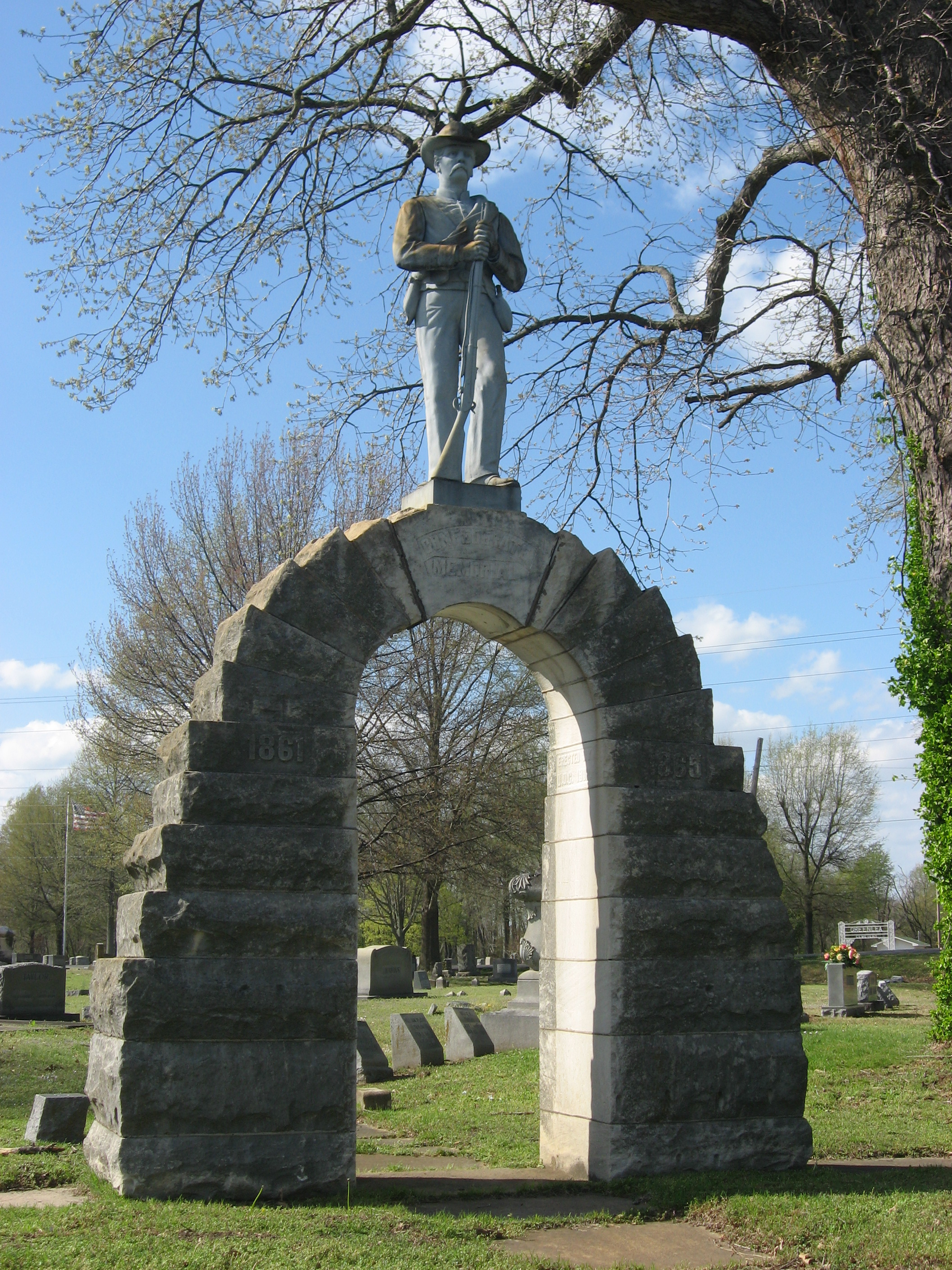

- Location within Kentucky Location within the United States
- Nearest city: Fulton, Kentucky
- Built: 1902
- MPS: Civil War Monuments of Kentucky MPS
- NRHP reference No.: 97000699
- Added to NRHP: July 17, 1997

The Confederate Memorial includes a 6-foot-tall (1.8 m) Confederate soldier statue atop an arch anchored in the Fulton, Kentucky Fairview Cemetery. Funded in 1902 by the Colonel Ed Crossland Chapter No. 347 of the United Daughters of the Confederacy, the historic monument is the only such monument in Kentucky to feature an arched base, made of rough-hewn limestone.

== Details ==
The arch is 10 feet (3.0 m) high. On the back of the arch it says "Erected by UDC 1902". The 6-foot-tall (1.8 m) Confederate soldier statue atop the arch is more typical; it is made of zinc, and features a typical Confederate soldier wearing a slouch hat, carrying a canteen and bed roll while resting himself with his rifle. No other monument in Kentucky features a statue atop an arch, making Fulton's monument unique.

Inside the arch, facing it on the left and approximately halfway up, are the names of the officers of the Colonel Ed Crossland Chapter No. 347 of the UDC, which funded the monument: "Mrs. Virginia A. F. Lollius, President; Mrs. Sallie M. Cooke 1st Vice Pres.; Mrs. Anna M. Murphy 2nd Vice Pres.; Mrs. Fannie L. W. Shackler Cor. Sec.; Mrs. Maybell T. Ewen Rec'd Sec.; Mrs. Phila P. Browder Treasurer; Miss Genevieve Cooke Historian."

The remains of a walkway are on all four sides of the monument. Due to how late it was built, the monument was meant to celebrate the Confederacy, not to mourn it, despite being at the entrance to a cemetery; earlier such monuments in Kentucky had a "funeral" aspect. Behind the arch is a step with the initials UCV, the abbreviation for the United Confederate Veterans. The front step simply says "Confederate", and the side steps say nothing.

On July 17, 1997, it was one of sixty-one different monuments to the Civil War in Kentucky placed on the National Register of Historic Places, as part of the Civil War Monuments of Kentucky Multiple Property Submission. One other monument on the list is in Fulton County: the Confederate Memorial Gateway in Hickman, located 20 miles (32 km) to the west in Hickman, Kentucky.

== Gallery ==
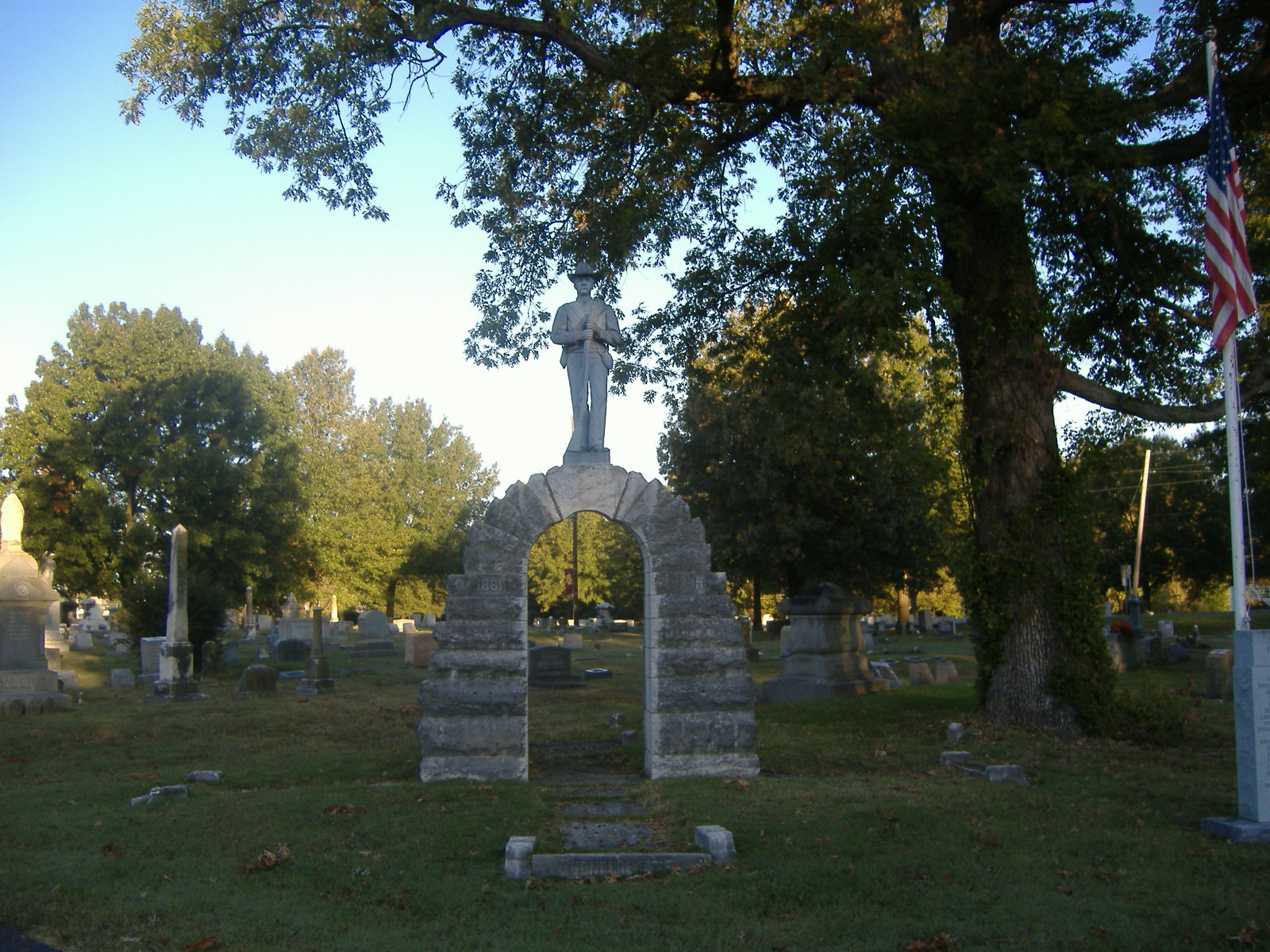
Wide view

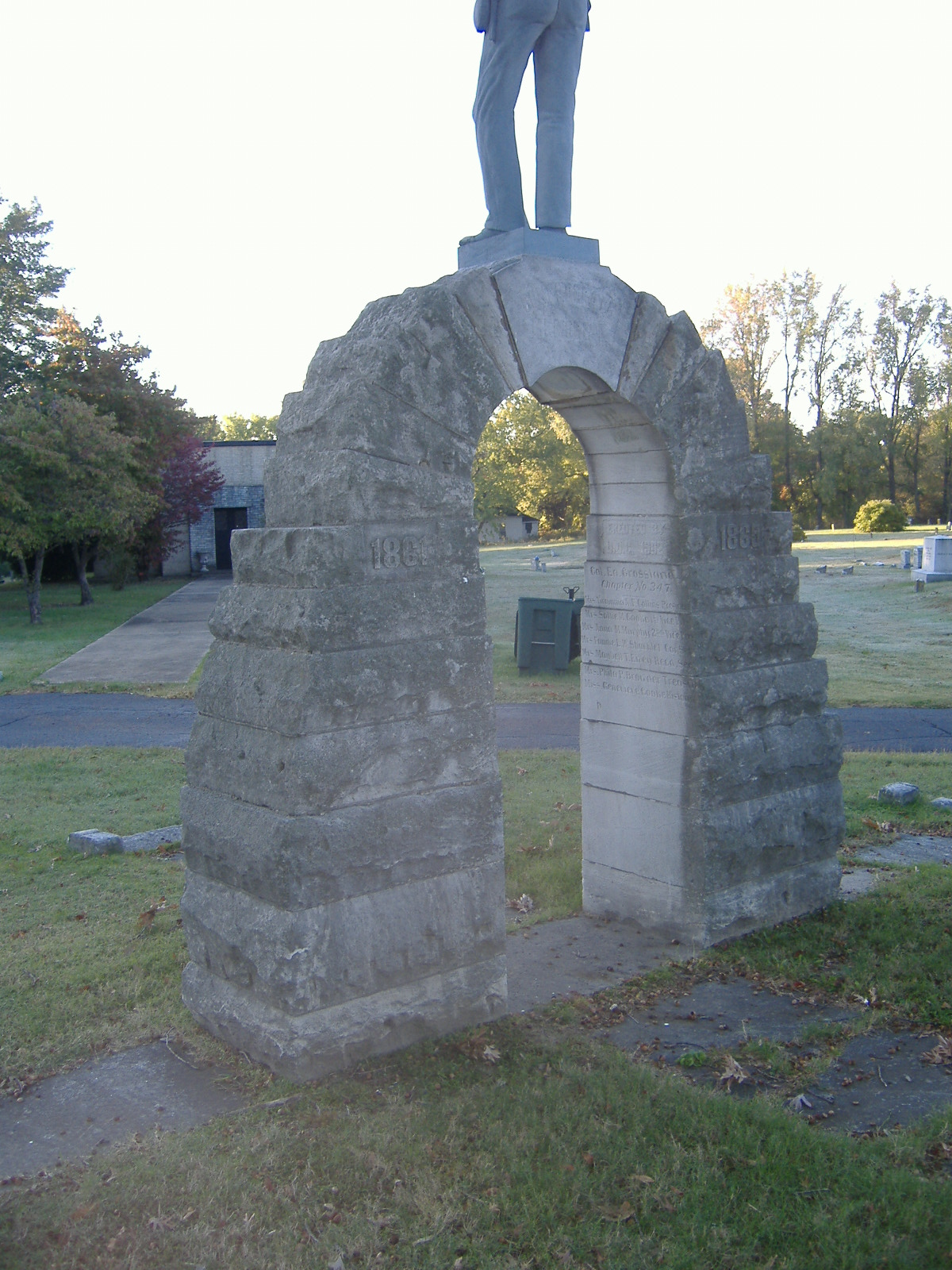
Rear view

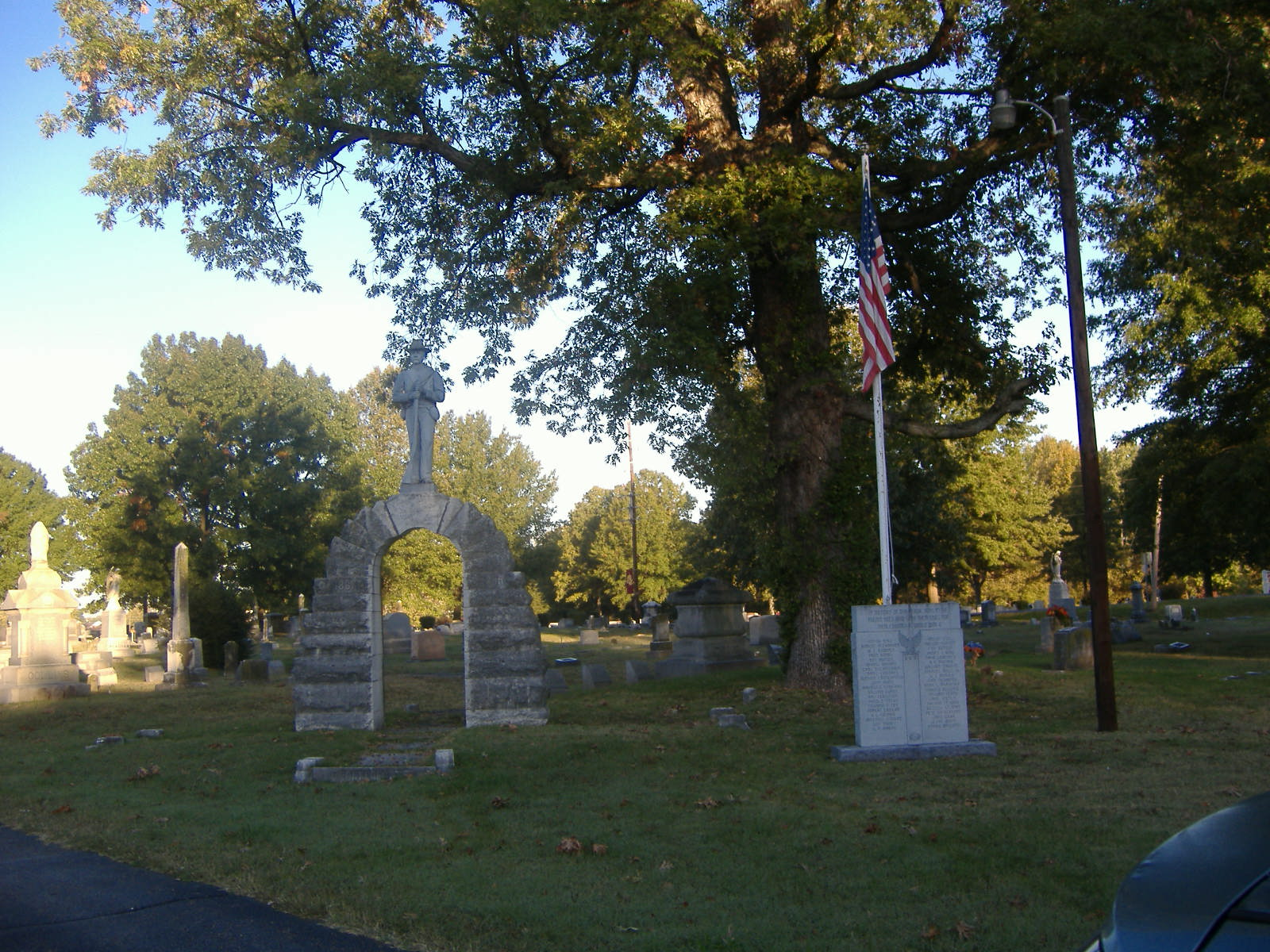
A monument to soldiers of World War II is close to the monument
