= Bayou de Chien =

River in the United States of America

Coordinates: 36.5767276°N 89.1920126°W

Bayou de Chien is a stream in the U.S. state of Kentucky.

Bayou de Chien is a name derived from the French meaning "dog creek". The prehistoric Adams site is on the banks of Bayou de Chien.

== See also ==
- List of rivers of Kentucky
