= Cheyenne High School (Nevada) =

Public high school in North Las Vegas, Nevada, U.S.

Location
- 3200 W. Alexander Road; North Las Vegas, Nevada 89032; United States; 36.23363°N 115.18316°W

Information
- Type: Public high school
- Motto: Dedicated to Excellence
- Established: 1991; 35 years ago
- School district: Clark County School District
- Principal: Anthony Nunez (24-25)
- Teaching staff: 86.00 (FTE)
- Grades: 9-12
- Enrollment: 1,855 (2024-2025)
- Student to teacher ratio: 21.57
- Colors: Navy blue and Vegas gold
- Mascot: Desert Shield
- Website: www.cheyennehs.org

Cheyenne High School is a high school in North Las Vegas, Nevada, United States.

The school was built in 1991, with an adjacent four portable classrooms, in North Las Vegas, a rapidly growing suburban middle class community. As of the 2006–2007 school year, the school's ethnic ratio was 29.7% White, 33.3% African American, 29.8% Hispanic, 6.4% Asian/Pacific Islander and 0.7% Native American. The male/female population was 53.2%/46.8%, and 14% of the students were IEP (students with disabilities). At that time, Cheyenne had a 59.2% graduation rate. President Barack Obama has given speeches at Cheyenne High School multiple times.

== Notable programs ==
These programs include:

- Standard Student Attire (SSA), also known as school uniforms, is intended to decrease disciplinary issues, create a safer campus and promote more efficient student learning.
- Pull-out tutoring – Non-proficient juniors and seniors who are in jeopardy of not passing their proficiency exam receive tutoring for the proficiency test during the school day, instead of staying late, coming early, or getting help elsewhere.
- Educational Exchange Program - The school is one of only ten in the US to have this program, which is soon to include Algeria and Russia.
- Smaller Learning Communities - This program began in the 2009–2010 school year. It includes four houses, each with its own motto. This is meant to provide a better chance to match students up with the right assistant principals, counselors, and teachers.
- United States Army JROTC's first year was 2009–2010.
- Desert Shields Marching Band began in the 1991–1992 school year.

== Athletics ==
Fall sports

- Cross country
- Football
- Women's volleyball
- Tennis
- Women's golf

Winter sports

- Basketball
- Wrestling
- Bowling - 2008-2009 Academic State Champs, boys and girls
- Women's soccer
- Winterline

Spring sports

- Track
- Baseball
- Softball
- Boys' volleyball
- Swimming
- Men's golf

=== Nevada Interscholastic Activities Association ===
- Cross country (girls') - 1996, 1997
