= Old Hickman Historic District =

Historic district in Kentucky, United States

- U.S. National Register of Historic Places
- Location within Kentucky Location within the United States
- Location: Roughly bounded by Clinton, Exchange, Obion, Moulton, and Kentucky Sts., Hickman, Kentucky
- Coordinates: 36°34′20″N 89°11′42″W
- Area: 9.2 acres (3.7 ha)
- Built: 1914
- Architectural style: Colonial Revival, Bungalow/American Craftsman, Italianate
- MPS: Hickman, Kentucky MPS
- NRHP reference No.: 90000778
- Added to NRHP: August 3, 1990

The Old Hickman Historic District, in Hickman, Kentucky, is a 9.2 acres (3.7 ha) historic district which was listed on the National Register of Historic Places in 1990. The listing included 45 contributing buildings, a contributing structure, and two contributing sites.

It is the original section of the town, along the Mississippi River, below rise to bluffs on the south. It includes the commercial section along Clinton Street and older residential sections as well. The commercial buildings are mostly two-part brick buildings; many have original storefront details.

One of the more significant buildings is the Laclede Hotel, a three-story hotel built c. 1898 with a keyhole arched entrance.

It includes Italianate and Colonial Revival architecture.
