= Hickman, Kentucky =

- City
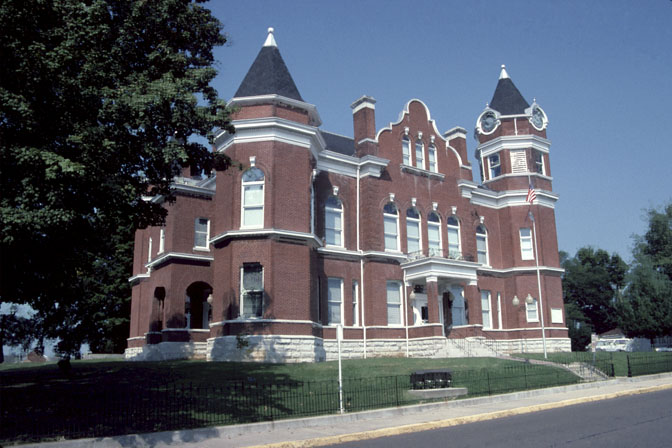
- Fulton County Courthouse in Hickman

- Location of Hickman in Fulton County, Kentucky.
- Coordinates: 36°34′2″N 89°11′11″W
- Country: United States
- State: Kentucky
- County: Fulton
- Named after: Paschal Hickman

Area
  - Total: 3.58 sq mi (9.27 km^{2})
  - Land: 3.55 sq mi (9.19 km^{2})
  - Water: 0.031 sq mi (0.08 km^{2})
- Elevation: 469 ft (143 m)

Population (2020)
  - Total: 2,365
  - Estimate (2022): 2,314
  - Density: 666.4/sq mi (257.28/km^{2})
- Time zone: UTC-6 (Central (CST))
  - Summer (DST): UTC-5 (CDT)
- ZIP Code: 42050
- Area codes: 270 & 364
- FIPS code: 21-36298
- GNIS feature ID: 0494109
- Website: cityofhickman.org

Hickman is a city and the county seat of Fulton County, Kentucky, United States. Located on the Mississippi River, the city had a population of 2,365 at the 2020 U.S. census and is classified as a home rule-class city. Hickman is part of the Union City micropolitan area.

== History ==
This area was long occupied by various cultures of indigenous peoples. European-American settlement of this area did not begin until decades after the American Revolutionary War. James Mills built the first cabin on the site in 1819. The community of Mills Point was large enough to receive a post office in 1830. Around 1834, G. Marr purchased much of the surrounding area and laid out more streets.

The community was renamed Hickman in 1837 after the maiden name of Marr's wife. The city was formally incorporated by the state assembly on February 18, 1841. In 1845, the city became the county seat.

A railroad from Hickman to Union City, Tennessee was completed in 1860. Originally incorporated in 1853 as the Hickman & Obion Railroad, it was bought out in 1871 by the Nashville, Chattanooga and St. Louis Railway.

David Walker, his wife, and their four children were lynched in Hickman in 1908 after Mr. Walker was accused of using inappropriate language with a white woman.

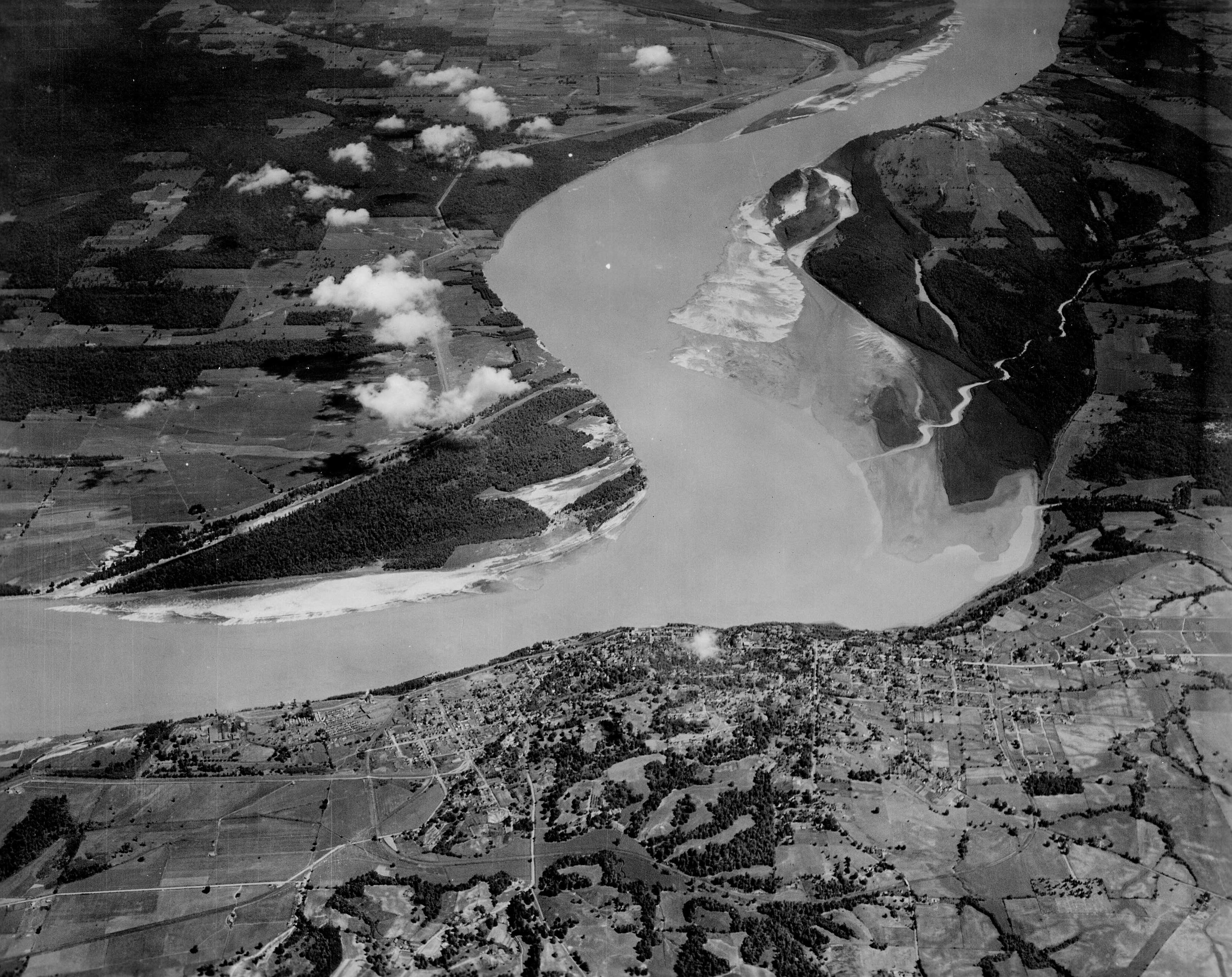
View of Hickman, 1920

Two floods devastated Hickman, the first in 1912 and the second in 1913. The flood of 1912 began when a levee located near Hickman broke. Within a few hours the water had risen to the roofs of houses. The flood of 1913 began when a levee near West Hickman broke on April 4. Baseball pitcher Rube Waddell was among the many who helped save the city during both floods. Waddell came down with pneumonia after each flood; he died of tuberculosis.

Another flood in August 2023 impacted Hickman, with mudslides impacting the downtown area and leading to road closures.

== Geography ==
According to the United States Census Bureau, the city has a total area of 3.6 square miles (9.3 km^{2}), of which 3.6 square miles (9.3 km^{2}) is land and 0.28% is water.

=== Climate ===
The climate in this area is characterized by hot, humid summers and generally mild to cool winters. According to the Köppen Climate Classification system, Hickman has a humid subtropical climate, abbreviated "Cfa" on climate maps.

== Demographics ==
Historical population
Census	Pop.	Note	%±
1850	401		—
1860	1,006		150.9%
1870	1,120		11.3%
1880	1,264		12.9%
1890	1,652		30.7%
1900	1,589		−3.8%
1910	2,736		72.2%
1920	2,033		−25.7%
1930	2,321		14.2%
1940	2,268		−2.3%
1950	2,037		−10.2%
1960	1,537		−24.5%
1970	3,048		98.3%
1980	2,894		−5.1%
1990	2,689		−7.1%
2000	2,560		−4.8%
2010	2,395		−6.4%
2020	2,365		−1.3%
2022 (est.)	2,314		−2.2%
U.S. Decennial Census

=== 2020 census ===
As of the 2020 census, Hickman had a population of 2,365. The median age was 39.4 years. 19.3% of residents were under the age of 18 and 17.1% of residents were 65 years of age or older. For every 100 females there were 121.0 males, and for every 100 females age 18 and over there were 123.2 males age 18 and over.

0.0% of residents lived in urban areas, while 100.0% lived in rural areas.

There were 850 households in Hickman, of which 28.1% had children under the age of 18 living in them. Of all households, 29.8% were married-couple households, 22.7% were households with a male householder and no spouse or partner present, and 41.2% were households with a female householder and no spouse or partner present. About 37.4% of all households were made up of individuals and 15.7% had someone living alone who was 65 years of age or older.

There were 993 housing units, of which 14.4% were vacant. The homeowner vacancy rate was 0.9% and the rental vacancy rate was 4.0%.

Racial composition as of the 2020 census
Race	Number	Percent
White	1,454	61.5%
Black or African American	768	32.5%
American Indian and Alaska Native	10	0.4%
Asian	2	0.1%
Native Hawaiian and Other Pacific Islander	5	0.2%
Some other race	19	0.8%
Two or more races	107	4.5%
Hispanic or Latino (of any race)	66	2.8%

=== 2000 census ===
As of the census of 2000, there were 2,560 people, 1,015 households, and 665 families residing in the city. The population density was 718.1 inhabitants per square mile (277.3/km^{2}). There were 1,177 housing units at an average density of 330.2 per square mile (127.5/km^{2}). The racial makeup of the city was 64.06% White, 34.96% African American, 0.08% Native American, 0.04% from other races, and 0.86% from two or more races. Hispanic or Latino of any race were 0.51% of the population.

There were 1,015 households, out of which 28.2% had children under the age of 18 living with them, 39.8% were married couples living together, 22.4% had a female householder with no husband present, and 34.4% were non-families. 32.1% of all households were made up of individuals, and 14.8% had someone living alone who was 65 years of age or older. The average household size was 2.33 and the average family size was 2.94.

In the city, the population was spread out, with 24.9% under the age of 18, 10.9% from 18 to 24, 26.8% from 25 to 44, 23.0% from 45 to 64, and 14.4% who were 65 years of age or older. The median age was 36 years. For every 100 females, there were 94.2 males. For every 100 females age 18 and over, there were 90.2 males.

The median income for a household in the city was $21,655, and the median income for a family was $27,384. Males had a median income of $25,625 versus $18,264 for females. The per capita income for the city was $11,573. About 24.8% of families and 27.1% of the population were below the poverty line, including 35.0% of those under age 18 and 18.7% of those age 65 or over.

== Arts and culture ==
Sites in Fulton listed on the National Register of Historic Places include:

- Confederate Memorial Gateway in Hickman
- Confederate Memorial in Fulton
- Buchanan Street Historic District
- Fulton County Courthouse
- Fulton Downtown Historic District
- Hickman Carnegie Library
- Old Hickman Historic District
- Thomas Chapel C.M.E. Church

Hickman has a public library, a branch of the Fulton County Public Library.

== Notable people ==
- Amy L. Bondurant, former U.S. Ambassador to the Organization for Economic Cooperation and Development (OECD)
- Robert Glen Coe, convicted murderer
- May Mourning Farris McKinney, President General of the United Daughters of the Confederacy
- S.G. Goodman, singer-songwriter
- Elvis Jacob Stahr Jr., President of Indiana University
