= Fort Thomas, Kentucky =

Fort Thomas
- City
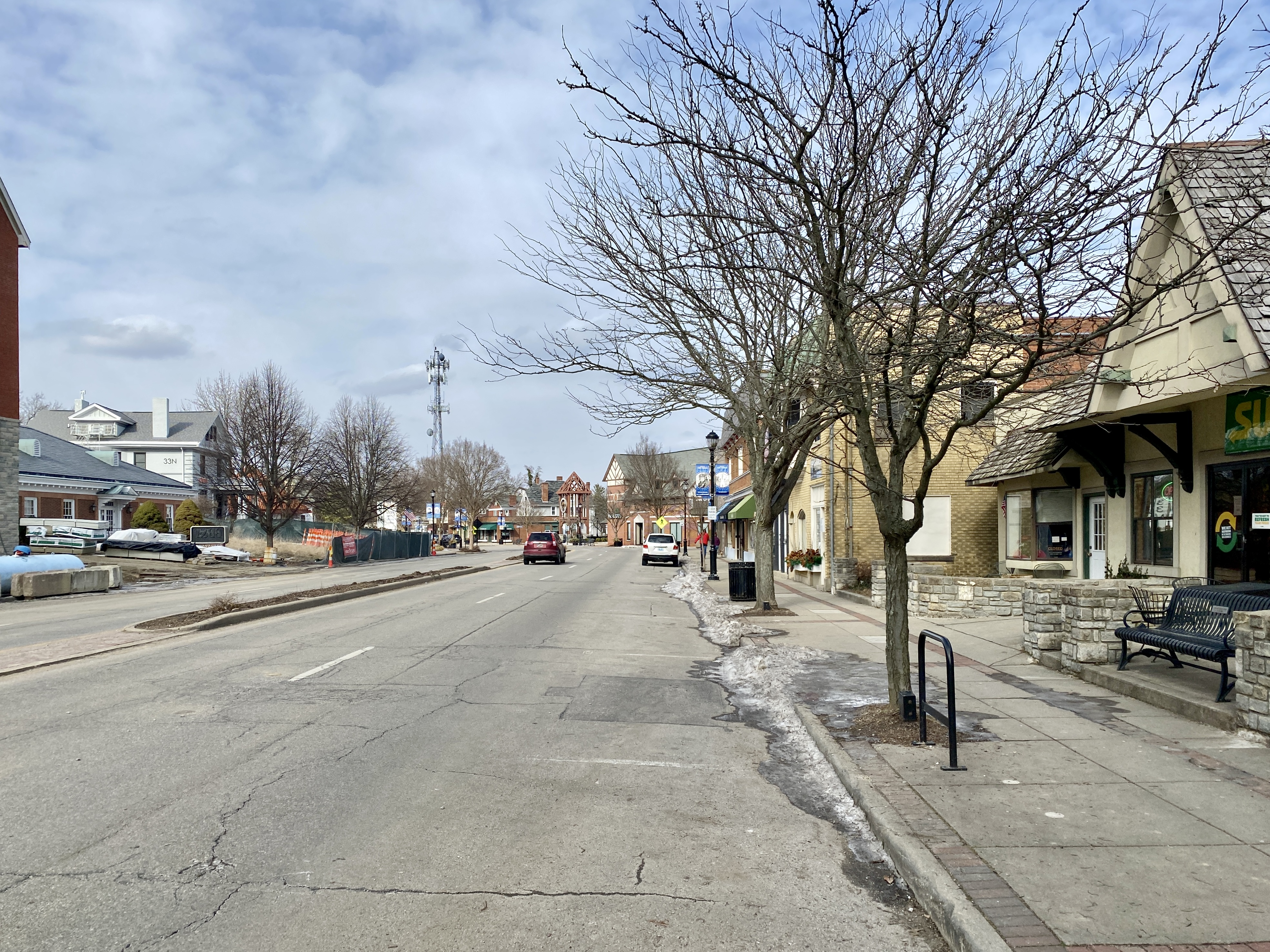
- Fort Thomas Avenue

- Flag Seal
- Motto: City of Beautiful Homes
- Location of Fort Thomas in Campbell County, Kentucky.
- Coordinates: 39°04′49″N 84°27′06″W
- Country: United States
- State: Kentucky
- County: Campbell
- Established: February 27, 1867
- Incorporated: October 6, 1914

Government
  - Mayor: Andy Ellison
  - City Administrative Officer: Matthew Kremer
  - City Treasurer: Joseph Ewald

Area
  - Total: 5.69 sq mi (14.74 km^{2})
  - Land: 5.67 sq mi (14.69 km^{2})
  - Water: 0.019 sq mi (0.05 km^{2})
- Elevation: 781 ft (238 m)

Population (2020)
  - Total: 17,438
  - Estimate (2022): 17,133
  - Density: 3,073.5/sq mi (1,186.69/km^{2})
- Time zone: UTC−5 (EST)
  - Summer (DST): UTC−4 (EDT)
- ZIP: 41075
- Area code: 859
- FIPS code: 21-28594
- GNIS feature ID: 2403648
- Website: fortthomasky.org

Fort Thomas is a home rule-class city in Campbell County, Kentucky, United States, on the southern bank of the Ohio River and the site of an 1890 US Army post. The population was 17,483 at the 2020 census, making it the largest city in Campbell County. It is part of the Cincinnati – Northern Kentucky metropolitan area.

== History ==
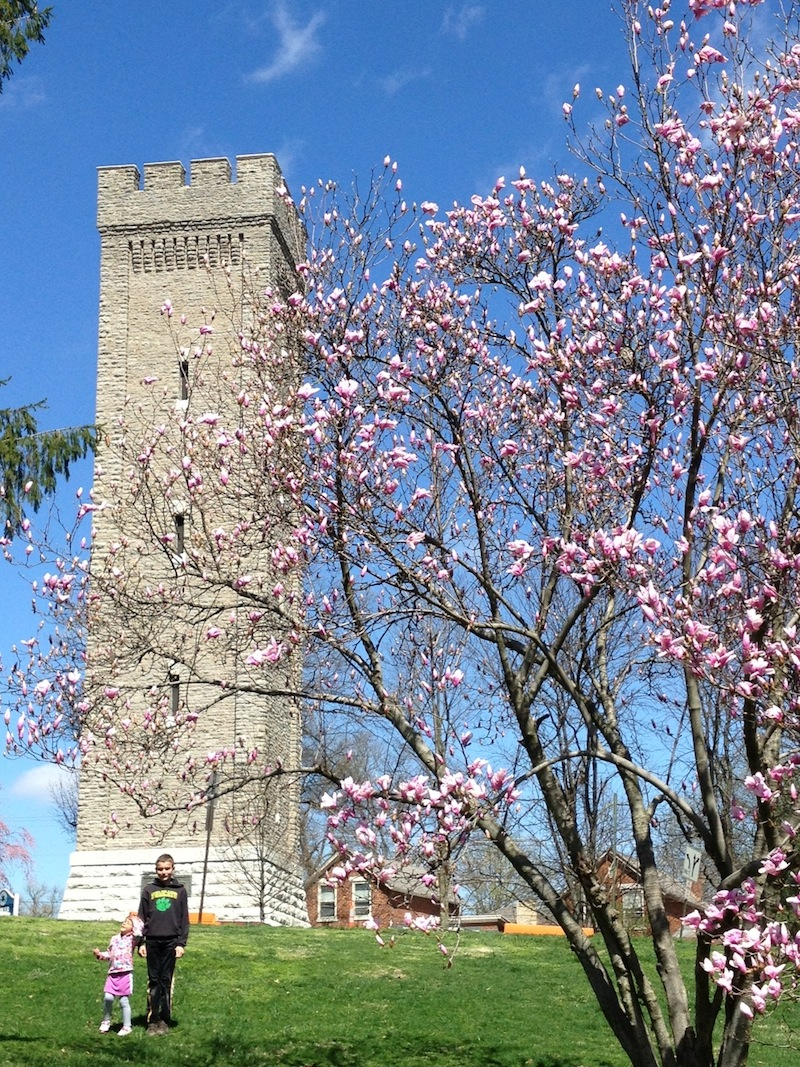
The Fort Thomas Water Tower was constructed in 1890

Evidence suggests that on or around 1749, prior to settlement by Europeans, a large battle occurred between a band of Cherokee Native Americans and victorious Miami tribe and Shawnee tribe Native Americans in what is now the city of Fort Thomas. As many as 600 graves of slain warriors have been unearthed by archeologists there.

=== Fort Thomas Army Post ===
In 1887, a site was needed to house a United States Army post to replace Newport Barracks located in the adjoining city of Newport, Kentucky. Built in 1803, Newport Barracks replaced the smaller Fort Washington, located across the Ohio River in Cincinnati, Ohio. That army post was located at the junction of the Licking and Ohio Rivers, but it was prone to flooding and flooded numerous times during the early 1880s. A new, less flood prone location was sought. General Philip Sheridan personally selected 11 acres (4.5 ha) of the city and dubbed the area the Highlands, predicting it to become the "West Point of the West". The new post was named Fort Thomas in honor of General George Henry Thomas.

The area has many remnants of this era with a 102-foot (31 m) high Stone Water Tower as a familiar landmark which stands at the entrance to Tower Park. It was the 16th structure built on the grounds of the Military Reservation. It encloses a standpipe which has a capacity of 100,000 gallons, pumped from the Water District reservoirs just across South Fort Thomas Avenue. In 1890 when the military base was established, such provisions for water supply was necessary as there was no other water tower in this area. Cannons that were captured in Cuba's Havana Harbor during the Spanish–American War rest on stone platforms in front of the Tower. The dates marked on these cannons, reflecting the date they were made in Barcelona, Spain, are "1768" and "1769".

The U.S. 6th Infantry Regiment moved to Fort Thomas, where it remained until called to action again in June 1898, in the Spanish–American War.

Also stationed at Fort Thomas during the Spanish–American War were the 8th Volunteer Infantry, known as the "8th Immunes". At the time, many erroneously believed that African Americans were naturally immune to tropical diseases or at least were better suited for service in the tropical environment of the Caribbean, and fearing the outbreak of tropical disease, actively recruited African-American soldiers for the conflict. Also, active service in the armed forces was considered beneficial to the status of African Americans in the United States, and was therefore lobbied for by civil rights leaders at the time. Booker T. Washington wrote the Secretary of the Navy that Cuba's climate was "peculiar and danger[o]us to the unaclimated [sic] white man. The Negro race in the South is accustomed to this climate." Other black leaders lobbied in Washington to reserve all ten regiments for their race. Although they lacked the political clout to accomplish that lofty goal, President McKinley was well aware that most states had refused to accept black volunteers, and he wanted to recognize the martial spirit of the minority that staunchly supported his Republican party. On May 26, the adjutant general's office issued General Orders, No. 55, indicating that five of the Immune regiments would be composed of "persons of color", commanded by officers who were also people of color. The others were composed of white men who had already contracted tropical diseases.

Fort Thomas served as a depot, induction center, and military hospital. Most of the garrison was transferred to the Veterans Administration in 1946, but military activities continued until the fort was closed in 1964.

== Geography ==
According to the United States Census Bureau, the city has a total area of 6.4 square miles (17 km^{2}), of which, 5.7 square miles (15 km^{2}) of it is land and 0.8 square miles (2.1 km^{2}) of it (11.82%) is water.

=== Climate ===
Fort Thomas is located within a climatic transition zone at the extreme northern limit of the humid subtropical climate. The local climate is a basically a blend of the subtropics to the south and the humid continental climate to the north. There are several "micro-climates" found in Fort Thomas which produce warmer than usual or cooler than usual "pockets". In the warmer niches it is not at all uncommon to find such "subtropical" novelties as the common wall lizard, the southern magnolia (Magnolia grandiflora), and even the rare dwarf palmetto; blue spruce and salamander tend to occur in the cooler and shaded niches. Moderating variables for the overall climate of Fort Thomas include: the Ohio River, the region's relatively large hills and valleys, and an urban heat influence due to the proximity of the Cincinnati/Northern Kentucky (Covington, Newport, etc.) metropolitan area. Fort Thomas is located within the Bluegrass region of Kentucky and Southern Ohio and is also situated within the northern periphery of the Upland South.

== Demographics ==
Historical population
Census	Pop.	Note	%±
1920	5,028		—
1930	10,008		99.0%
1940	11,034		10.3%
1950	10,870		−1.5%
1960	14,896		37.0%
1970	16,338		9.7%
1980	16,012		−2.0%
1990	16,032		0.1%
2000	16,495		2.9%
2010	16,325		−1.0%
2020	17,438		6.8%
2024 (est.)	16,914		−3.0%
U.S. Decennial Census

=== 2020 census ===
As of the 2020 census, Fort Thomas had a population of 17,438. The median age was 38.2 years. 25.6% of residents were under the age of 18 and 16.3% of residents were 65 years of age or older. For every 100 females there were 92.4 males, and for every 100 females age 18 and over there were 89.7 males age 18 and over.

100.0% of residents lived in urban areas, while 0.0% lived in rural areas.

There were 6,941 households in Fort Thomas, of which 34.1% had children under the age of 18 living in them. Of all households, 51.9% were married-couple households, 16.9% were households with a male householder and no spouse or partner present, and 26.0% were households with a female householder and no spouse or partner present. About 29.9% of all households were made up of individuals and 12.0% had someone living alone who was 65 years of age or older.

There were 7,301 housing units, of which 4.9% were vacant. The homeowner vacancy rate was 1.1% and the rental vacancy rate was 5.0%.

Racial composition as of the 2020 census
Race	Number	Percent
White	15,938	91.4%
Black or African American	239	1.4%
American Indian and Alaska Native	24	0.1%
Asian	306	1.8%
Native Hawaiian and Other Pacific Islander	2	0.0%
Some other race	162	0.9%
Two or more races	767	4.4%
Hispanic or Latino (of any race)	387	2.2%

=== 2010 census ===
As of the census of 2010, there were 16,325 people, 6,787 households, and 4,219 families residing in the city. The population density was 2,909.8 inhabitants per square mile (1,123.5/km^{2}). There were 7,028 housing units at an average density of 1,239.8 per square mile (478.7/km^{2}). The racial makeup of the city was 96.1% White, 1.3% African American, 0.1% Native American, 0.9% Asian, less than 0.01% Pacific Islander, 0.4% from other races, and 1.2% from two or more races. Hispanic or Latino of any race were 1.4% of the population.

There were 6,787 households, out of which 30.1% had children under the age of 18 living with them, 48.8% were married couples living together, 9.7% had a female householder with no husband present, and 37.8% were non-families. 32.6% of all households were made up of individuals, and 12.5% had someone living alone who was 65 years of age or older. The average household size was 2.35 and the average family size was 3.03.

In the city the population was spread out, with 24.2% under the age of 18, 7.7% from 18 to 24, 25.1% from 25 to 44, 27.4% from 45 to 64, and 15.6% who were 65 years of age or older. The median age was 39.8 years. For every 100 females, there were 90.6 males. For every 100 females age 18 and over, there were 84.5 males.

The median income for a household in the city was $49,575, and the median income for a family was $63,006. Males had a median income of $43,733 versus $30,209 for females. The per capita income for the city was $26,657. About 2.8% of families and 4.8% of the population were below the poverty line, including 4.7% of those under age 18 and 3.2% of those age 65 or over.

== Education ==
Fort Thomas Independent Schools includes 3 elementary schools (Robert D. Johnson Elementary, Ruth Moyer Elementary, and Samuel Woodfill Elementary), Highlands Middle School, and Highlands High School, which are consistently ranked among the top in the country. Highlands High School is the only public high school in the state with a Cum Laude Society chapter.

Fort Thomas is home to the Phillip N. Carrico branch of the Campbell County Public Library.

== Notable people ==
- Pearl Bryan, woman murdered in 1896
- Jim Bunning, Republican Senator
- Cris Collinsworth, sportscaster, former Cincinnati Bengals wide receiver
- Jac Collinsworth, sportscaster
- Arquímides Ordóñez, professional footballer
- Harlan Hubbard, artist
- Lucien Hubbard, Oscar-winning film producer
- Jerome P. Keuper, founder and president of Florida Institute of Technology
- Jared Lorenzen, former New York Giants quarterback
- Mike Mitchell, Pittsburgh Steelers safety
- Doug Pelfrey, former kicker for the Cincinnati Bengals.
- John Schlarman, former Kentucky football player and coach
- Jeff Walz, head coach of the University of Louisville women's basketball team
- Samuel Woodfill, one of the most decorated soldiers of World War I

== See also ==
- List of cities and towns along the Ohio River
- Engels Maps
