= 1974 Chicago Bears season =

NFL team season

- Owner: George Halas
- General manager: Jim Finks
- Head coach: Abe Gibron
- Home stadium: Soldier Field

Results
- Record: 4–10
- Division place: 4th NFC Central
- Playoffs: Did not qualify

The 1974 Chicago Bears season was their 55th regular season completed in the National Football League. The team finished with a 4–10 record, which led to the ouster of Abe Gibron as head coach.

== Offseason ==
=== NFL draft ===
1974 Chicago Bears draft
| Round | Pick | Player | Position | College | Notes |
| 1 | 4 | Waymond Bryant | Linebacker | Tennessee State | |
| 1 | 20 | Dave Gallagher | Defensive tackle | Michigan | |
| 3 | 54 | Wayne Wheeler | Wide receiver | Alabama | |
| 3 | 56 | Greg Horton | Guard | Colorado | |
| 3 | 62 | Cliff Taylor | Running back | Memphis State | |
| 7 | 160 | Jack Ettinger | Wide receiver | Arkansas | |
| 8 | 186 | Alan Chadwick | Quarterback | East Tennessee State | |
| 8 | 190 | Ken Grandberry | Running back | Washington State | |
| 11 | 264 | Norm Hodgins | Safety | LSU | |
| 12 | 290 | Jeff Sevy | Defensive tackle | California | |
| 13 | 316 | Joe Barnes | Quarterback | Texas Tech | |
| 14 | 342 | Paul Vellano | Defensive tackle | Maryland | |
| 15 | 368 | Oliver Alexander | Tight end | Grambling | |
| 16 | 394 | Randy Geist | Defensive back | Colorado | |
| 17 | 420 | Craig Holland | Quarterback | Texas–Arlington | |
Made roster

=== Undrafted free agents ===
1974 undrafted free agents of note
| Player | Position | College |
|---|---|---|
| Marty Kranz | Defensive back | Minnesota State |

== Roster ==
1974 Chicago Bears roster
| Quarterbacks (QB): 18 Joe Barnes; 10 Bobby Douglass; 19 Gary Huff; Running backs (RB): 29 Dave Gagnon; 47 Ken Grandberry; 33 Gary Kosins; 22 Cliff Taylor; 46 Pete Van Valkenburg; 36 Perry Williams; Wide receivers (WR): 43 George Farmer; 17 Ike Hill; 80 Bo Rather; 83 Charlie Wade; 85 Wayne Wheeler; Tight ends (TE): 88 Jim Kelly; 82 Fred Pagac; 86 Bob Parsons P | Offensive linemen (OL): 79 Lionel Antoine T; 74 Bob Asher T; 52 Rich Coady C; 62 Tom Forrest G; 65 Randy Jackson C; 64 Ernie Janet G; 63 Steve Kinney T; 78 Bob Newton G; Defensive linemen (DL): 60 Wally Chambers DT; 76 Dave Gallagher DE; 84 Richard Harris DE; 72 Gary Hrivnak DE; 67 Don Hultz DT; 68 Jim Osborne DT; 89 Mel Tom DE | Linebackers (LB): 50 Waymond Bryant MLB; 55 Doug Buffone OLB; 30 Jimmy Gunn OLB; 58 Bob Pifferini OLB; 57 Don Rives MLB; Defensive backs (DB): 45 Craig Clemons SS; 48 Allan Ellis CB; 34 Norm Hodgins FS; 31 Bill Knox CB; 44 Garry Lyle FS; 27 Randy Montgomery CB; 20 Joe Taylor CB; Special teams (ST): 15 Mirro Roder K | Reserve: 26 Carl Garrett RB (IR); 35 Jim Harrison RB (IR); 69 Mike Hoban G (IR); 87 Tom Reynolds WR (IR); Rookies in italics |

== Regular season ==
=== Schedule ===
| Week | Date | Opponent | Result | Record | Venue | Attendance |
|---|---|---|---|---|---|---|
| 1 | September 15 | **Detroit Lions** | **W** 17–9 | 1–0 | Soldier Field | 48,134 |
| 2 | September 22 | New York Jets | **L** 21–23 | 1–1 | Soldier Field | 50,213 |
| 3 | September 29 | at **Minnesota Vikings** | **L** 7–11 | 1–2 | Metropolitan Stadium | 46,217 |
| 4 | October 6 | New Orleans Saints | **W** 24–10 | 2–2 | Soldier Field | 45,818 |
| 5 | October 13 | at Atlanta Falcons | **L** 10–13 | 2–3 | Atlanta Stadium | 47,835 |
| 6 | October 21 | **Green Bay Packers** | **W** 10–9 | 3–3 | Soldier Field | 50,623 |
| 7 | October 27 | at Buffalo Bills | **L** 6–16 | 3–4 | Rich Stadium | 78,084 |
| 8 | November 3 | **Minnesota Vikings** | **L** 0–17 | 3–5 | Soldier Field | 33,343 |
| 9 | November 10 | at **Green Bay Packers** | **L** 3–20 | 3–6 | Milwaukee County Stadium | 46,567 |
| 10 | November 17 | San Francisco 49ers | **L** 0–34 | 3–7 | Soldier Field | 42,686 |
| 11 | November 24 | at **Detroit Lions** | **L** 17–34 | 3–8 | Tiger Stadium | 40,930 |
| 12 | December 1 | New York Giants | **W** 16–13 | 4–8 | Soldier Field | 18,802 |
| 13 | December 8 | at San Diego Chargers | **L** 21–28 | 4–9 | San Diego Stadium | 33,662 |
| 14 | December 15 | at Washington Redskins | **L** 0–42 | 4–10 | RFK Stadium | 52,085 |
Note: Intra-division opponents are in **bold** text.

=== Game summaries ===
==== Week 1: vs. Detroit Lions ====
Gary Huff hit Charlie Wade with two long passes, one from 73 yards and another from 43, setting up Chicago touchdowns that beat Detroit. Carl Garrett ran in from one yard for the Bears first touchdown and Huff threw a nine-yard touchdown pass for a 14–0 lead. It would be though the high mark for the Bears that season.

==== Week 6: vs. Green Bay Packers ====
| Team | 1 | 2 | 3 | 4 | Total |
|---|---|---|---|---|---|
| Packers | 0 | 0 | 6 | 3 | 9 |
| • **Bears** | 10 | 0 | 0 | 0 | 10 |

- Date: October 21
- Location: Soldier Field, Chicago, Illinois
- Game start: 8:00 p.m. CST
- Game weather: 39 °F (4 °C), wind 13 mph (21 km/h)
- Television network: ABC
- Source: Pro-Football-Reference.com

Scoring summary
| 1 | Bears | Mirro Roder 23-yard field goal | Bears 3–0 |
| 1 | Bears | Charlie Wade 57-yard pass from Gary Huff (Mirro Roder kick) | Bears 10–0 |
| 3 | Packers | Chester Marcol 34-yard field goal | Bears 10–3 |
| 3 | Packers | Chester Marcol 33-yard field goal | Bears 10–6 |
| 4 | Packers | Chester Marcol 36-yard field goal | Bears 10–9 |

=== Standings ===
NFC Central
| | W | L | T | PCT | DIV | CONF | PF | PA | STK |
|---|---|---|---|---|---|---|---|---|---|
| Minnesota Vikings | 10 | 4 | 0 | .714 | 4–2 | 8–3 | 310 | 195 | W3 |
| Detroit Lions | 7 | 7 | 0 | .500 | 3–3 | 6–5 | 256 | 270 | L1 |
| Green Bay Packers | 6 | 8 | 0 | .429 | 3–3 | 4–7 | 210 | 206 | L3 |
| Chicago Bears | 4 | 10 | 0 | .286 | 2–4 | 4–7 | 152 | 279 | L2 |
