= List of Purdue Boilermakers in the NFL draft =

This is a list of Purdue Boilermakers football players in the NFL draft.

== Key ==
B	Back	K	Kicker	NT	Nose tackle
C	Center	LB	Linebacker	FB	Fullback
DB	Defensive back	P	Punter	HB	Halfback
DE	Defensive end	QB	Quarterback	WR	Wide receiver
DT	Defensive tackle	RB	Running back	G	Guard
E	End	T	Offensive tackle	TE	Tight end

== Selections ==
Year	Round	Pick	Overall	Name	Team	Position
1936	3	9	27	Frank Loebs	New York Giants	E
1936	5	3	39	Wayne Sandefur	Pittsburgh Steelers	B
1937	1	10	10	Johnny Drake	Cleveland Rams	B
1937	6	7	57	George Bell	Detroit Lions	G
1938	1	7	7	Cecil Isbell	Green Bay Packers	B
1938	3	7	22	Marty Schreyer	Green Bay Packers	T
1938	8	2	62	Clem Woltman	Philadelphia Eagles	T
1939	3	4	19	Joe Mihal	Philadelphia Eagles	T
1939	7	4	54	Tony Ippolito	Philadelphia Eagles	B
1939	11	4	94	Paul Humphrey	Philadelphia Eagles	C
1940	3	9	24	Lou Brock	Green Bay Packers	B
1940	6	2	42	Frank Bykowski	Pittsburgh Steelers	G
1940	10	6	86	Leon DeWitte	Detroit Lions	B
1940	10	9	89	Jack Brown	Green Bay Packers	B
1940	13	2	112	Ted Hennis	Philadelphia Eagles	B
1941	8	2	62	Dave Rankin	Chicago Bears	E
1941	10	6	86	Mike Byelene	Green Bay Packers	B
1942	7	2	52	Italo Rossi	Cleveland Rams	T
1942	9	10	80	John Petty	Chicago Bears	B
1943	31	4	294	Bill Buffington	Chicago Bears	B
1944	3	11	27	Babe Dimancheff	Boston Yanks	B
1944	19	8	194	Barry French	Chicago Bears	T
1944	20	6	203	Bob Johnson	Green Bay Packers	C
1944	24	6	247	Pete DeMaria	Green Bay Packers	G
1945	6	1	44	Dick Barwegan	Brooklyn Dodgers	G
1945	8	8	73	Pat O'Brien	Chicago Bears	T
1945	12	5	114	Joe Winkler	Cleveland Rams	C
1945	19	1	187	John Andretich	Chicago Cardinals	B
1946	5	6	36	Ed Cody	Green Bay Packers	B
1946	21	8	198	Norm Maloney	Detroit Lions	E
1946	27	4	254	Ken Smock	Chicago Bears	B
1946	31	1	291	Ralph Clymer	Green Bay Packers	G
1947	31	8	293	Bulbs Ehlers	Chicago Bears	B
1947	32	2	295	Bob Plevo	Washington Redskins	T
1948	6	10	45	Phil O'Reilly	Pittsburgh Steelers	T
1948	7	1	46	Bob Pfohl	New York Giants	B
1948	12	8	103	George Papach	Pittsburgh Steelers	B
1948	13	5	110	Bob Heck	Los Angeles Rams	E
1948	16	8	143	Clyde Grimenstein	Chicago Bears	E
1948	19	7	172	Pete Barbolak	Pittsburgh Steelers	T
1948	29	9	274	Abe Gibron	Pittsburgh Steelers	G
1949	2	2	13	Bob DeMoss	Boston Yanks	B
1949	6	4	55	Abe Gibron	New York Giants	G
1949	14	4	135	Norb Adams	New York Giants	B
1949	22	9	220	Bill Sprang	Chicago Cardinals	C
1950	3	5	32	Lou Karras	Washington Redskins	T
1950	4	1	41	Earl Murray	Baltimore Colts	G
1950	6	12	78	Ken Gorgal	Cleveland Browns	B
1950	8	3	95	Harry Szulborski	Green Bay Packers	B
1950	22	4	278	Jim Tate	Detroit Lions	T
1950	22	6	280	Bob DeMoss	New York Giants	B
1951	4	7	45	Barry French	Pittsburgh Steelers	T
1951	9	4	102	Neil Schmidt	Chicago Cardinals	B
1951	10	1	111	James Janosek	Washington Redskins	T
1951	10	12	122	Earl Murray	New York Giants	G
1951	15	12	183	Joe Skibinski	Cleveland Browns	G
1951	20	1	232	John Kerestes	Washington Redskins	B
1951	24	7	286	George Buksar	Detroit Lions	B
1951	29	11	350	John Considine	New York Giants	T
1952	2	8	21	Pete Brewster	Chicago Cardinals	E
1952	11	2	123	Leo Sugar	Chicago Cardinals	E
1952	19	11	228	Mike Maccioli	Cleveland Browns	B
1952	29	2	339	Don Kasperan	Chicago Cardinals	B
1953	2	1	14	Bernie Flowers	Baltimore Colts	E
1953	3	3	28	Dale Samuels	Chicago Cardinals	QB
1953	17	3	196	Earl Heninger	Chicago Cardinals	B
1953	20	4	233	Tom Mahin	Chicago Bears	T
1954	6	9	70	Ken Panfil	Los Angeles Rams	T
1954	18	7	212	Walt Cudzik	Washington Redskins	C
1954	22	7	260	Max Schmaling	Washington Redskins	B
1954	22	8	261	Jim Wojciehowski	Philadelphia Eagles	E
1954	22	9	262	Ray Pacer	Los Angeles Rams	T
1955	1	5	5	Tom Bettis	Green Bay Packers	G
1955	8	2	87	Johnny Allen	Washington Redskins	C
1955	9	9	106	Fred Preziosio	San Francisco 49ers	T
1955	13	5	150	Jim Whitmer	Pittsburgh Steelers	B
1955	17	12	205	Bob Leonard	Cleveland Browns	B
1955	26	2	303	Walt Houston	Washington Redskins	G
1955	26	8	309	Johnny Kerr	San Francisco 49ers	E
1955	26	12	313	Don Fife	Cleveland Browns	C
1956	2	4	17	Joe Krupa	Pittsburgh Steelers	T
1956	4	2	39	Dick Murley	Pittsburgh Steelers	G
1956	5	3	52	Bill Murakowski	Pittsburgh Steelers	B
1956	16	1	182	Len Zyzda	Detroit Lions	DE
1956	27	12	325	Ed Dwyer	Cleveland Browns	E
1957	1	5	5	Len Dawson	Pittsburgh Steelers	QB
1957	4	10	47	Lamar Lundy	Los Angeles Rams	E
1957	22	1	254	John Simerson	Philadelphia Eagles	T
1957	22	8	261	Ed Voytek	Washington Redskins	G
1958	4	5	42	Erich Barnes	Chicago Bears	DB
1958	9	7	104	Gene Selawski	Los Angeles Rams	T
1958	11	3	124	Mel Dillard	Philadelphia Eagles	B
1958	19	3	220	Ron Sabal	Philadelphia Eagles	G
1958	27	2	315	Neil Habig	Green Bay Packers	C
1959	3	9	33	Tom Franckhauser	Los Angeles Rams	E
1959	5	3	51	Nick Mumley	Philadelphia Eagles	T
1959	8	7	91	Tom Barnett	Pittsburgh Steelers	B
1959	10	4	112	Jack Laraway	Detroit Lions	B
1959	13	3	147	Dick Stillwagon	Philadelphia Eagles	B
1959	20	4	232	Dan McGrew	Detroit Lions	T
1959	24	7	283	Wayne Farmer	Pittsburgh Steelers	T
1960	3	9	33	Ross Fichtner	Cleveland Browns	DB
1960	5	5	53	Bob Jarus	Cleveland Browns	RB
1960	7	4	76	Lenard Wilson	Pittsburgh Steelers	B
1960	7	10	82	Jerry Beabout	Baltimore Colts	T
1960	10	8	116	Clyde Washington	Cleveland Browns	B
1960	11	12	132	Dale Rems	New York Giants	T
1960	16	4	184	Joe Kulbacki	Washington Redskins	B
1960	18	7	211	Emory Turner	Philadelphia Eagles	G
1960	19	4	220	Ron Maltony	Washington Redskins	G
1960	19	5	221	Rich Brooks	Green Bay Packers	E
1961	17	1	225	Willie Jones	Minnesota Vikings	B
1962	4	11	53	Stan Sczurek	Cleveland Browns	G
1962	6	3	73	Larry Bowie	Minnesota Vikings	T
1962	6	5	75	John Elwell	St. Louis Cardinals	E
1962	9	4	116	Roy Walker	Baltimore Colts	RB
1962	14	3	185	Patrick Russ	Minnesota Vikings	T
1962	16	2	212	Ron Skufca	Los Angeles Rams	T
1963	1	13	13	Don Brumm	St. Louis Cardinals	DE
1963	6	4	74	Tom Bloom	Cleveland Browns	B
1963	13	7	175	John Greiner	Washington Redskins	E
1964	10	2	128	Tom Boris	Philadelphia Eagles	B
1964	11	3	143	Gene Donaldson	Washington Redskins	LB
1965	2	3	17	Jim Garcia	Cleveland Browns	T
1965	5	8	64	Ed Flanagan	Detroit Lions	C
1965	12	7	161	John Kuznieski	Philadelphia Eagles	RB
1965	18	14	252	Charley King	Baltimore Colts	RB
1966	1	7	7	Jerry Shay	Minnesota Vikings	T
1966	13	15	200	Bob Hadrick	Baltimore Colts	WR
1966	16	3	233	Jim Long	Pittsburgh Steelers	WR
1966	19	14	289	Karl Singer	Cleveland Browns	T
1966	20	11	301	Randy Minniear	New York Giants	RB
1967	1	4	4	Bob Griese	Miami Dolphins	QB
1967	1	21	21	John Charles	Boston Patriots	DB
1967	8	9	194	Mike Barnes	Pittsburgh Steelers	T
1967	14	18	359	Pat Conley	Baltimore Colts	LB
1967	17	18	437	George Catavolos	Philadelphia Eagles	DB
1968	3	10	65	Lance Olssen	San Francisco 49ers	T
1968	4	22	105	Jim Beirne	Houston Oilers	WR
1969	1	3	3	Leroy Keyes	Philadelphia Eagles	RB
1969	4	12	90	Perry Williams	Green Bay Packers	RB
1969	5	21	125	Chuck Kyle	Dallas Cowboys	LB
1969	8	22	204	Clanton King	Kansas City Chiefs	T
1969	10	25	259	Marion Griffin	Baltimore Colts	TE
1969	11	26	286	Gary Roberts	New York Jets	G
1969	16	13	403	Dave Stydahar	Chicago Bears	G
1970	1	3	3	Mike Phipps	Cleveland Browns	QB
1970	3	3	55	Tim Foley	Miami Dolphins	DB
1970	5	11	115	Bill McKoy	Denver Broncos	LB
1970	9	4	212	Dennis Wirgowski	Boston Patriots	DE
1970	10	21	255	Bill Yanchar	Cleveland Browns	DT
1970	15	20	384	Tom Bayless	New York Jets	DT
1971	5	3	107	Donnie Green	Buffalo Bills	T
1971	5	14	118	Stan Brown	Cleveland Browns	WR
1971	9	9	217	John Handy	Denver Broncos	LB
1971	10	21	255	Ron Maree	Miami Dolphins	DT
1971	13	23	335	John Bullock	San Francisco 49ers	RB
1972	3	16	68	Tom Luken	Philadelphia Eagles	G
1972	6	15	145	Charles Potts	Detroit Lions	DB
1972	10	15	249	Jim Teal	Detroit Lions	LB
1972	12	25	311	Ashley Bell	Miami Dolphins	TE
1973	1	5	5	Dave Butz	St. Louis Cardinals	DT
1973	1	9	9	Otis Armstrong	Denver Broncos	RB
1973	1	19	19	Darryl Stingley	New England Patriots	WR
1973	2	22	48	Gary Hrivnak	Chicago Bears	DT
1973	2	25	51	Steve Baumgartner	New Orleans Saints	DE
1973	4	1	79	Gregg Bingham	Houston Oilers	LB
1973	6	23	153	Brent Myers	Oakland Raiders	T
1973	7	17	173	Donn Smith	Kansas City Chiefs	T
1974	5	13	117	Carl Capria	Detroit Lions	DB
1974	7	7	163	Bob Herrick	Cleveland Browns	WR
1974	8	22	204	Mark Gefert	Pittsburgh Steelers	LB
1974	12	21	307	Bob Bobrowski	Baltimore Colts	QB
1975	1	7	7	Larry Burton	New Orleans Saints	WR
1975	6	8	138	Fred Cooper	Detroit Lions	DB
1975	8	4	186	Barry Santini	Cleveland Browns	TE
1975	8	24	206	Ralph Perretta	San Diego Chargers	G
1976	1	7	7	Mike Pruitt	Cleveland Browns	RB
1976	1	20	20	Ken Novak	Baltimore Colts	DT
1976	2	16	44	Ken Long	Detroit Lions	G
1976	9	24	261	Craig Nagel	Cleveland Browns	QB
1976	10	21	286	Dwight Lewis	Oakland Raiders	DB
1976	14	26	401	Jeff Stapleton	Minnesota Vikings	T
1977	4	5	89	Scott Dierking	New York Jets	RB
1977	5	6	118	Dave LaFary	New Orleans Saints	T
1977	7	17	184	Blane Smith	Cleveland Browns	TE
1977	9	23	246	Mike Northington	Washington Redskins	RB
1977	10	10	261	Mark Vitali	Kansas City Chiefs	QB
1977	11	15	294	Connie Zelencik	Chicago Bears	C
1978	6	1	139	John Skibinski	Chicago Bears	RB
1978	10	12	262	Fred Arrington	Detroit Lions	LB
1979	8	11	203	Rick Moss	Chicago Bears	DB
1980	2	11	39	Keena Turner	San Francisco 49ers	LB
1980	11	1	278	Wayne Smith	Detroit Lions	DB
1980	12	16	321	Marcus Jackson	Cleveland Browns	DT
1981	2	4	32	Dave Young	New York Giants	TE
1981	4	15	98	Mark Herrmann	Denver Broncos	QB
1981	5	24	135	Calvin Clark	Buffalo Bills	DE
1981	6	21	159	Bill Kay	Houston Oilers	DB
1982	4	11	94	Steve Bryant	Houston Oilers	WR
1982	8	22	217	Jim Fritzche	Philadelphia Eagles	T
1982	10	15	266	Roosevelt Barnes	Detroit Lions	LB
1983	8	14	210	Matt Hernandez	Seattle Seahawks	T
1983	9	26	250	Mark Brown	Miami Dolphins	LB
1984	2	14	42	Mel Gray	New Orleans Saints	RB
1984	2	15	43	Eric Jordan	New England Patriots	RB
1984	3	10	66	Chris Scott	Indianapolis Colts	DT
1984	5	20	132	Cliff Benson	Atlanta Falcons	TE
1984	7	23	191	Scott Campbell	Pittsburgh Steelers	QB
1985	2	4	32	Don Anderson	Indianapolis Colts	DB
1985	5	14	126	Bruce King	Kansas City Chiefs	RB
1986	1	3	3	Jim Everett	Houston Oilers	QB
1986	6	7	145	Ray Wallace	Houston Oilers	RB
1986	6	23	161	Mark Jackson	Denver Broncos	WR
1986	7	9	175	Rodney Carter	Pittsburgh Steelers	RB
1986	11	2	279	Mark Drenth	Tampa Bay Buccaneers	T
1986	12	3	308	Steve Griffin	Atlanta Falcons	WR
1987	1	10	10	Rod Woodson	Pittsburgh Steelers	DB
1988	2	20	47	Fred Strickland	Los Angeles Rams	LB
1988	5	16	125	Cris Dishman	Houston Oilers	DB
1989	4	7	91	Jerrol Williams	Pittsburgh Steelers	LB
1990	5	24	133	Calvin Williams	Philadelphia Eagles	WR
1990	8	9	202	Bill Hitchcock	Seattle Seahawks	T
1990	11	3	279	Derrick Kelson	New York Jets	DB
1990	12	1	305	Shawn McCarthy	Atlanta Falcons	P
1991	3	16	71	Steve Jackson	Houston Oilers	DB
1991	5	7	118	Scott Conover	Detroit Lions	G
1992	4	27	111	Frank Kmet	Buffalo Bills	DE
1993	7	17	185	Jeff Zgonina	Pittsburgh Steelers	DT
1995	6	4	175	Ryan Grigson	Cincinnati Bengals	T
1996	2	5	35	Mike Alstott	Tampa Bay Buccaneers	RB
1998	3	9	70	Brian Alford	New York Giants	WR
1998	5	17	140	Mark Fischer	Washington Redskins	G
1998	7	29	218	Edwin Watson	Green Bay Packers	RB
1999	3	28	89	Chike Okeafor	San Francisco 49ers	DE
1999	4	16	111	Rosevelt Colvin	Chicago Bears	DE
2000	6	29	195	Michael Hawthorne	New Orleans Saints	DB
2000	6	35	201	David Nugent	New England Patriots	DT
2001	2	1	32	Drew Brees	San Diego Chargers	QB
2001	2	17	48	Matt Light	New England Patriots	T
2001	5	5	136	Vinny Sutherland	Atlanta Falcons	WR
2001	5	15	146	Chukky Okobi	Pittsburgh Steelers	C
2001	7	1	201	Brandon Gorin	San Diego Chargers	T
2002	3	24	89	Akin Ayodele	Jacksonville Jaguars	LB
2002	4	11	109	Travis Dorsch	Cincinnati Bengals	K
2003	6	18	191	Joe Odom	Chicago Bears	LB
2004	3	3	66	Nick Hardwick	San Diego Chargers	C
2004	3	4	67	Stuart Schweigert	Oakland Raiders	DB
2004	3	6	69	Gilbert Gardner	Indianapolis Colts	LB
2004	3	33	96	Landon Johnson	Cincinnati Bengals	LB
2004	4	2	98	Shaun Phillips	San Diego Chargers	DE
2004	4	20	116	Niko Koutouvides	Seattle Seahawks	LB
2004	6	7	172	Kelly Butler	Detroit Lions	T
2004	6	24	189	Craig Terrill	Seattle Seahawks	DT
2004	7	22	223	Jacques Reeves	Dallas Cowboys	DB
2005	4	5	106	Kyle Orton	Chicago Bears	QB
2006	2	22	54	Bernard Pollard	Kansas City Chiefs	DB
2006	4	30	127	Ray Edwards	Minnesota Vikings	DE
2006	5	2	135	Rob Ninkovich	New Orleans Saints	DE
2006	5	35	167	Charles Davis	Pittsburgh Steelers	TE
2007	1	26	26	Anthony Spencer	Dallas Cowboys	DE
2007	5	12	149	Uche Nwaneri	Jacksonville Jaguars	G
2007	7	13	223	Mike Otto	Tennessee Titans	T
2008	1	30	30	Dustin Keller	New York Jets	TE
2008	3	29	92	Cliff Avril	Detroit Lions	DE
2008	4	35	134	Stanford Keglar	Tennessee Titans	LB
2009	3	3	67	Alex Magee	Kansas City Chiefs	DT
2009	6	28	201	Curtis Painter	Indianapolis Colts	QB
2010	2	24	56	Mike Neal	Green Bay Packers	DT
2011	1	16	16	Ryan Kerrigan	Washington Redskins	LB
2012	5	18	153	Dennis Kelly	Philadelphia Eagles	T
2012	6	25	195	Nick Mondek	Houston Texans	T
2013	2	12	44	Kawann Short	Carolina Panthers	DT
2014	5	7	147	Ricardo Allen	Atlanta Falcons	DB
2014	5	9	149	Kevin Pamphile	Tampa Bay Buccaneers	T
2015	5	27	163	Ryan Russell	Dallas Cowboys	DE
2016	6	14	189	Anthony Brown	Dallas Cowboys	DB
2017	5	31	175	DeAngelo Yancey	Green Bay Packers	WR
2018	5	6	143	Ja'Whaun Bentley	New England Patriots	LB
2020	4	30	136	Brycen Hopkins	Los Angeles Rams	TE
2020	7	1	215	Markus Bailey	Cincinnati Bengals	LB
2021	2	17	49	Rondale Moore	Arizona Cardinals	WR
2021	4	8	113	Derrick Barnes	Detroit Lions	LB
2022	1	30	30	George Karlaftis	Kansas City Chiefs	DE
2022	3	35	99	David Bell	Cleveland Browns	WR
2022	7	39	260	Zander Horvath	Los Angeles Chargers	FB
2023	4	29	131	Charlie Jones	Cincinnati Bengals	WR
2023	4	34	135	Aidan O'Connell	Las Vegas Raiders	QB
2023	5	36	171	Payne Durham	Tampa Bay Buccaneers	TE
2023	7	24	241	Cory Trice	Pittsburgh Steelers	DB
2023	7	38	255	Jalen Graham	San Francisco 49ers	LB
2024	5	31	166	Tyrone Tracy Jr.	New York Giants	RB
2024	7	30	270	Sanoussi Kane	Baltimore Ravens	DB
2025	5	16	154	Marcus Mbow	New York Giants	G

== Notes ==
Mel Gray and Eric Jordan were part of the 1984 NFL Supplemental Draft.

== Notable undrafted players ==
Note: No drafts held before 1920

Debut Year	Player	Position	Debut Team	Notes
1962	Jim Tiller	RB	New York Titans	—
1965	Sam Longmire	DB	Kansas City Chiefs	—
1965	Harold Wells	LB	Philadelphia Eagles	—
1966	Larry Kaminski	C	Denver Broncos	—
1967	Jack Calcaterra	G	New York Giants	—
1974	Bill Knox	DB	Chicago Bears	—
1976	Gary Danielson	QB	Detroit Lions	—
1979	Jerome King	DB	Atlanta Falcons	—
1980	Mike Augustyniak	FB	New Orleans Saints	—
1981	Jim Looney	LB	San Francisco 49ers	—
1983	David Frye	LB	Atlanta Falcons	—
1983	Scott Virkus	DE	Buffalo Bills	—
1986	Don Baldwin	DE	New York Jets	—
1986	Derek Wimberly	DE	Washington Redskins	—
1987	Matt Kinzer	P	Detroit Lions	—
1987	Mac May	TE	Minnesota Vikings	—
1987	Pat Snyder	LB	Indianapolis Colts	—
1992	Jim Schwantz	LB	Chicago Bears	—
1994	Jeff Hill	WR	Cincinnati Bengals	—
1994	Pat Johnson	DB	Atlanta Falcons	—
1994	Jermaine Ross	WR	Los Angeles Rams	—
1996	Chris Sedoris	C	Washington Redskins	—
1999	Isaac Jones	WR	Indianapolis Colts	—
1999	Chukie Nwokorie	DE	Indianapolis Colts	—
2000	Randall Lane	WR	Arizona Cardinals	—
2001	Ian Allen	G	Kansas City Chiefs	—
2002	Matt Mitrione	DT	New York Giants	—
2004	Joey Harris	RB	Carolina Panthers	—
2004	Gene Mruczkowski	G	New England Patriots	—
2004	John Standeford	WR	Washington Redskins	—
2005	Taylor Stubblefield	WR	Carolina Panthers	—
2008	Dorien Bryant	WR	Pittsburgh Steelers	—
2009	Ryan Baker	DE	Miami Dolphins	—
2009	Kory Sheets	RB	San Francisco 49ers	—
2010	Brandon King	CB	Indianapolis Colts	—
2010	David Pender	DB	Philadelphia Eagles	—
2010	Torri Williams	S	Houston Texans	—
2011	Kyle Adams	TE	Chicago Bears	—
2012	Carson Wiggs	K	Seattle Seahawks	—
2013	Josh Johnson	CB	San Diego Chargers	—
2014	Bruce Gaston	DT	Arizona Cardinals	—
2015	Gabe Holmes	TE	Oakland Raiders	—
2015	Akeem Hunt	RB	New York Giants	—
2015	Raheem Mostert	RB	Houston Texans	—
2016	Frankie Williams	CB	Indianapolis Colts	—
2017	Jordan Roos	G	Seattle Seahawks	—
2018	Austin Larkin	DE	Dallas Cowboys	—
2018	David Steinmetz	T	Miami Dolphins	—
2019	David Blough	QB	Cleveland Browns	—
2021	Tyler Coyle	S	Dallas Cowboys	—
2021	Grant Hermanns	G	New York Jets	—
2022	DaMarcus Mitchell	DE	New England Patriots	—
2023	Reese Taylor	CB	Kansas City Chiefs	—
2023	Milton Wright	WR	Los Angeles Chargers	—
