= Sandefur =

Sandefur is a surname. It is the surname of:

- Dirk Sandefur (born 1961), associate justice of the Montana Supreme Court
- Duke Sandefur, screenwriter for Ghost Town (1988 film) and Atlas Shrugged: Part II
- Kelly Sandefur, producer of American television series Family Matters
- Mike Sandefur, owner of the Texas Star Ferris wheel
- Randy Sandefur, head coach of Long Beach State 49ers men's volleyball for 1970–1974
- Rebecca Sandefur, American sociologist
- Thomas Sandefur, fictional character in The Insider (film)
- Wayne Sandefur, Purdue football player drafted by the Pittsburgh Steelers in 1936
