= Dave Dunaway =

American football player (1945–2001)

No. 29, 45, 83
- Position: Wide receiver

Personal information
- Born: January 19, 1945; Philadelphia, Pennsylvania, U.S.
- Died: March 12, 2001 (aged 56); Raleigh, North Carolina, U.S.
- Listed height: 6 ft 2 in (1.88 m)
- Listed weight: 205 lb (93 kg)

Career information
- High school: Jacksonville (NC)
- College: Duke (1963-1966)
- NFL draft: 1967: 2nd round, 41st overall pick

Career history
- Green Bay Packers (1967–1968); Atlanta Falcons (1968); New York Giants (1969)

Awards and highlights
- First-team All-ACC (1966)

Career NFL statistics
- Receptions: 2
- Receiving yards: 37
- Punts: 13
- Punting yards: 497
- Longest punt: 52
- Stats at Pro Football Reference

Dave Dunaway (January 19, 1945 – March 12, 2001) was a wide receiver in the National Football League (NFL).

== Biography ==
Dunaway was born David Harry Dunaway on January 19, 1945, in Philadelphia, Pennsylvania. He died March 12, 2001, at age 56 in Raleigh, North Carolina.

== High school and college ==
Dunaway was an outstanding high school football player in Jacksonville, North Carolina. He was also a high school track and field star there. At the 1963 North Carolina State Track and Field Championships, he not only won in the 100 yard dash, the 220 and the high jump, he set records for the state meet in all three events. He played at the collegiate level at Duke University, where he played with future NFL linebacker Bob Matheson. At Duke University, he played football from 1964 to 1966, and caught 75 passes for 1145 yards. In 1965, he finished first in the Atlantic Coast Conference in yards per catch and second in touchdowns. In his senior season, his 614 receiving yards led the ACC. He was honored with selection as a first-team all-ACC end, and to the 1967 College All-Star football team. He wore number 86 at Duke.

== NFL career ==
Dunaway was drafted by the Green Bay Packers in the second round of the 1967 NFL/AFL draft, the 41st overall pick. Dunaway spent the entire 1967 season on the Packers' taxi squad. He began the 1968 NFL season with the Packers, but was cut after playing in only two games. He was then picked up by the Atlanta Falcons and was with them for 8 games. However, he had no catches for either team in 1968. He was cut by the Falcons late in the 1969 preseason, and was briefly on the Washington Redskins taxi squad, before signing with the New York Giants. The Giants promoted him from their taxi squad chiefly to become the team's fourth punter in four seasons. While he only was on the active roster with the Giants for the final three games of the 1969 season, his only marks in NFL statistics came there. He punted 13 times for a 38.2 yard average, caught two passes for a total of 37 yards (both in a 49–6 blowout win over the St. Louis Cardinals) His lone carry was for 4 yards for the Giants, but it was an important play. It came on a successful fake punt that helped lead the Giants on a 4th quarter game-winning drive against the Pittsburgh Steelers. However, the Giants cut Dunaway in September 1970, shortly before the season opener. Instead, the Giants handed their punting duties to Bill Johnson, who had punted the four previous years for the minor league Orlando Panthers.

He can be seen in clips, especially from a week 5 episode of This Week in Pro Football shown in 1969, from NFL Films wearing number 45 on the side lines as Head Coach Norm Van Brocklin is shown talking to various players during a mid season game against the Giants while Dunaway was a member of the Atlanta Falcons in 1968. Dunaway wore a different number at each of his NFL stops: 29 with the Packers, 45 with the Falcons and 83 with the Giants.
