= Dick Absher =

American football player (1944–2026)

No. 82, 57, 53
- Position: Linebacker

Personal information
- Born: April 19, 1944; Washington, D.C., U.S.
- Died: February 25, 2026 (aged 81)
- Listed height: 6 ft 4 in (1.93 m)
- Listed weight: 230 lb (104 kg)

Career information
- High school: Bullis School (Potomac, Maryland)
- College: Maryland
- NFL draft: 1967: 5th round, 125th overall pick

Career history
- Washington Redskins (1967); Atlanta Falcons (1967–1968); New Orleans Saints (1969–1971); Philadelphia Eagles (1972)

Awards and highlights
- First-team All-ACC (1966)

Career NFL statistics
- Fumble recoveries: 5
- Interceptions: 3
- Sacks: 1
- Stats at Pro Football Reference

Richard Alfred Absher Jr. (April 19, 1944 – February 25, 2026) was an American professional football player who was a linebacker in the National Football League. He played college football for the Maryland Terrapins and was selected in the fifth round of the 1967 NFL/AFL draft by the Philadelphia Eagles. Absher played in the NFL for the Washington Redskins, Atlanta Falcons, New Orleans Saints, and the Eagles.

== Biography ==
Dick Absher was born in Washington, D.C., on April 19, 1944. He attended Bullis Preparatory High School in Silver Spring, Maryland before going to college at the University of Maryland.

He was selected 125th overall by the NFL's Philadelphia Eagles in the fifth round of the 1967 NFL/AFL draft. On October 19, 1967, his contract was sold to the NFL's Washington Redskins, for whom he played one game before being released on October 30. He was signed by the Atlanta Falcons on November 1 and played one game that season for that team as well.

Absher died from pneumonia on February 25, 2026, at the age of 81.
