= Bob Stein (American football) =

American football player (born 1948)

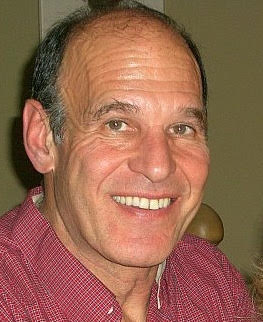

No. 66, 52, 56
- Position: Linebacker

Personal information
- Born: January 22, 1948 (age 78); Minneapolis, Minnesota, U.S.
- Listed height: 6 ft 3 in (1.91 m)
- Listed weight: 235 lb (107 kg)

Career information
- High school: St. Louis Park (St. Louis Park, Minnesota)
- College: Minnesota
- NFL draft: 1969: 5th round, 126th overall pick

Career history
- Kansas City Chiefs (1969-1972); Los Angeles Rams (1973–1974); San Diego Chargers (1975); Minnesota Vikings (1975)

Awards and highlights
- Super Bowl champion (IV); AFL champion (1969); First-team All-American (1967); Second-team All-American (1968); 2× First-team All-Big Ten (1967, 1968)

Career NFL/AFL statistics
- Fumble recoveries: 1
- Interceptions: 2
- Sacks: 0.5
- Stats at Pro Football Reference
- College Football Hall of Fame

Robert Allen Stein (born January 22, 1948) is an American former professional football player who was a linebacker in the National Football League (NFL). He played college football for the Minnesota Golden Gophers as a defensive end and placekicker. He was a two-time All-American, Academic All-American, and three-time Academic All-Big Ten player.

He began his professional career in 1969 with the American Football League's Kansas City Chiefs, with whom he won the fourth and final AFL-NFL World Championship Game after the 1969 pro football season. Speaking of that game, he said, "I will always remember guys like Jerry Mays, Johnny Robinson, Budde, Tyrer, Arbanas, Buck, Bobby Bell, etc. nearly crying in our locker room before Super Bowl IV when Hank Stram surprised us with the AFL patch on our jerseys. After 10 years of the AFL being called an inferior league, winning that Super Bowl was particularly meaningful."

Stein, at 21, was the youngest player to play in the Super Bowl for a decade. He graduated in the top 10% of the University of Missouri – Kansas City Law School, attending full-time while playing for the Chiefs. He was offered scholarships to Harvard, Michigan, and Stanford law schools after college. He was the University of Minnesota Rhodes Scholarship nominee, and later co-founded the Gopher football booster group, the Goal Line Club, in 1980.

Stein was the first president and CEO of the NBA's Minnesota Timberwolves, a position he held until 1995. As Senior Executive for the expansion franchise and new Target Center Arena, Stein helped create over 850 new jobs. The Wolves established and still hold the all-time NBA attendance record and sold out all suites during his tenure. Stein directed planning, design, public approvals, and financing for the 900,000 sq ft Target Center and managed the $240 million+ refinance of Target Center Arena, the Timberwolves and the owners' health clubs. Before leading the Timberwolves organization, he had been a 10-year sports attorney-agent in football, basketball, and hockey.

Stein was President of the Timberwolves Foundation, which contributed over 100,000 event tickets for schools/non-profits and $1.5 million+ for at-risk youth in 6 NBA seasons. He was appointed to the Minnesota Boxing Commission in December 2007 by Governor Tim Pawlenty.

Stein has been inducted into the University of Minnesota Sports Hall of Fame, The Jewish Sports Hall of Fame, the St. Louis Park (MN) Athletic Hall of Fame, and the University of Minnesota Sports Hall of Fame. He is also in the HOF of Beta Theta Pi fraternity. He is a member of the Missouri Sports Hall of Fame Honor Roll of World Champions for the 1969 Chiefs team.

Stein has volunteered on community boards, including Bank of America MN Advisory, Children's Cancer Research Fund, Taste of NFL/Hunger Related Events, Jacob Wetterling Foundation, Minnesota Zoo, Minneapolis Downtown Council, Hennepin County Sheriff's advisory board and FBI Citizen's Academy.

In 2009, Stein conceived and began the first class action lawsuit on behalf of retired NFL players against the NFL. His case, Dryer v. NFL, fought for fair payment for the NFL's use of player identities, including in NFL Films. He represents many past NFL players in concussion-related cases.

He was selected by Sports Business Journal in 2019 as one of the 100 Most Accomplished Former NFL Players in the 100 Years of NFL edition.

In 2020, Bob was selected to the National Football Foundation College Football Hall of Fame.

== See also ==
- Other American Football League players
