= Bob Grant (American football) =

American football player (1946–2024)

- Grant in 1970

No. 51
- Position: Linebacker

Personal information
- Born: October 14, 1946; Jacksonville, Florida, U.S.
- Died: May 19, 2024 (aged 77); San Pedro, California, U.S.
- Listed height: 6 ft 2 in (1.88 m)
- Listed weight: 225 lb (102 kg)

Career information
- High school: Georgetown (Jacksonville, North Carolina)
- College: Wake Forest
- NFL draft: 1968: 2nd round, 50th overall pick

Career history
- Baltimore Colts (1968–1970); Washington Redskins (1971)

Awards and highlights
- Super Bowl champion (V); NFL champion (1968); First-team All-ACC (1966); NCAA Inspiration Award (2022)

Career NFL statistics
- Fumble recoveries: 2
- Interceptions: 5
- Touchdowns: 1
- Sacks: 2
- Stats at Pro Football Reference

Bob Grant (October 14, 1946 – May 19, 2024) was an American professional football player who was a linebacker in the National Football League (NFL) for the Baltimore Colts and Washington Redskins. He played college football for the Wake Forest Demon Deacons and was selected in the second round of the 1968 NFL draft. Grant died in San Pedro, Los Angeles on May 19, 2024, at the age of 77.

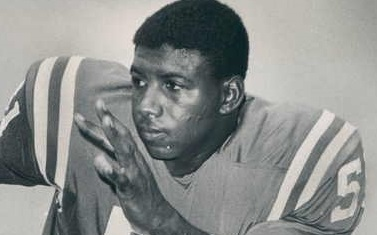
Grant as a rookie in 1968.
