= Doug Crusan =

American football player (born 1946)

No. 77
- Position: Offensive tackle

Personal information
- Born: July 26, 1946 (age 80); Monessen, Pennsylvania, U.S.
- Listed height: 6 ft 5 in (1.96 m)
- Listed weight: 250 lb (113 kg)

Career information
- High school: Monessen
- College: Indiana (1964-1967)
- NFL draft: 1968: 1st round, 27th overall pick

Career history
- Miami Dolphins (1968-1974)

Awards and highlights
- 2× Super Bowl champion (VII, VIII); Second-team All-American (1967); Second-team All-Big Ten (1967)

Career NFL/AFL statistics
- Games played: 82
- Games started: 61
- Fumble recoveries: 1
- Stats at Pro Football Reference

Douglas Gordon Crusan Jr. (born July 26, 1946) is an American former professional football player who was an offensive tackle for seven seasons in the National Football League (NFL) for the Miami Dolphins. He played in Super Bowls VI, VII, and VIII. Crusan Jr was the starting offensive tackle for the 1972 Super Bowl Champion Miami Dolphins, the only NFL team to finish a season with a perfect record (17–0).

Crusan was also the team captain for the 1967 Indiana Hoosiers football team and played defensive tackle in the 1968 Rose Bowl against Southern California and O. J. Simpson. Crusan was a first-round selection in the 1968 NFL/AFL draft, picked by the Dolphins and has been involved in the private sector as a senior business manager since retiring from the NFL, and has been actively involved in the NFLPA for 38 years.

== College career ==
Crusan Jr. played college football at Indiana University where he was originally recruited as an offensive tackle and played that position for the 1965 and 1966 seasons but was switched to defensive tackle by coach John Pont for the 1967 season as part of a broader transition to a faster, blitz oriented 4-4 defense. Crusan shredded nearly 40 pounds as part of the transition and became a key contributor to one of the most successful seasons in Indiana football history.

In 1967, Crusan earned 2nd Team All-Big 10 and 2nd Team All-American honors for his play on defense. That season, the Hoosiers compiled a 9–2 record, won a share of the Big Ten championship, and earned the program’s first and only trip to the Rose Bowl, where they faced top-ranked USC. Crusan later played in both the American Bowl and the Senior Bowl.

He was inducted into the Indiana University Athletics Hall of Fame in 1987.

== NFL career ==
Crusan was selected by the Miami Dolphins in the first round of the 1968 NFL/AFL Draft. He played for the Dolphins from 1968 to 1974, primarily as an offensive tackle. Crusan started in three consecutive Super Bowls (VI, VII, and VIII) and was a key part of Miami’s offensive line during their dominant early-1970s run under head coach Don Shula.

He is best known as the starting left tackle for the 1972 Dolphins, who completed the only perfect season in NFL history, finishing 17–0 and winning Super Bowl VII. Crusan’s role in protecting quarterback Bob Griese and clearing paths for running backs Larry Csonka and Mercury Morris contributed to the team’s success and enduring legacy.
