= 1967 All-Big Ten Conference football team =

American college football all-star team

The 1967 All-Big Ten Conference football team consists of American football players chosen by various organizations for All-Big Ten Conference teams for the 1967 Big Ten Conference football season. Five of the first-team players were chosen from the Purdue Boilermakers, including quarterback Mike Phipps and running backs Perry Williams and Leroy Keyes, the latter of whom was the only player unanimously chosen for the All-Big Ten team.

== Offensive selections ==
=== Quarterbacks ===
- Mike Phipps, Purdue (AP-1; UPI-2)
- Harry Gonso, Indiana (AP-2; UPI-1)

=== Running backs ===
- Leroy Keyes, Purdue (AP-1; UPI-1)
- Ron Johnson, Michigan (AP-1; UPI-1)
- Perry Williams, Purdue (AP-1; UPI-1 [fullback])
- Richard "Chico" Kurzowski, Northwestern (AP-2; UPI-2)
- Silas McKinnie, Iowa (AP-2; UPI-2 [fullback])
- Jack Isenbarger, Indiana (AP-2; UPI-2)

=== Ends ===
- Jim Beirne, Purdue (AP-1; UPI-1)
- John Wright, Illinois (AP-1; UPI-2)
- Billy Anders, Ohio State (UPI-1)
- Al Bream, Iowa (AP-2)
- Jim Berline, Michigan (AP-2)
- Charlie Sanders, Minnesota (UPI-2)

=== Tackles ===
- John Williams, Minnesota (AP-1; UPI-1)
- Dick Himes, Ohio State (AP-1; UPI-1)
- Joe Przbyycki, Michigan State (AP-2; UPI-2)
- Chuck Kuzneski, Purdue (AP-2)
- Dave Foley, Ohio State (UPI-2)

=== Guards ===
- Bruce Gunstra, Northwestern (AP-1; UPI-1)
- Gary Cassells, Indiana (AP-1; UPI-1)
- Bob Russell, Indiana (AP-2)
- Bob Sebeck, Purdue (AP-2; UPI-2)
- Ray Phillips, Michigan (UPI-2)

=== Centers ===
- Joe Dayton, Michigan (AP-1; UPI-1 )
- Jack Rudnay, Northwestern (AP-2; UPI-2)

== Defensive selections ==
=== Ends ===
- Bob Stein, Minnesota (AP-1; UPI-1)
- George Olion, Purdue (AP-2; UPI-1)
- George Chatlos, Michigan State (AP-1; UPI-2)
- Bob Holmes, Purdue (UPI-2)
- Cal Snowden, Indiana (AP-2)

=== Tackles ===
- McKinley Boston, Minnesota (AP-1; UPI-1)
- Lance Olssen, Purdue (AP-2; UPI-1)
- Tom Domres, Wisconsin (AP-1; UPI-2)
- Doug Crusan, Indiana (AP-2; UPI-2)

=== Middle guard ===
- Chuck Kyle, Purdue (AP-1; UPI-1)
- Ed Duren, Minnesota (UPI-2)
- Dennis Morgan, Michigan (AP-2; UPI-2)

=== Linebackers ===
- Ken Criter, Wisconsin (AP-1; UPI-1)
- Dick Marvel, Purdue (AP-2; UPI-1)
- Ken Kaczmarek, Indiana (AP-1)
- Jim Sniadecki, Indiana (AP-1)
- Tom Stincic, Michigan (UPI-1)
- Dirk Worden, Ohio State (AP-2; UPI-2
- Noel Jenke, Minnesota (UPI-2)
- Terry Miller, Illinois (AP-2)

=== Defensive backs ===
- Ron Bess, Illinois (AP-1; UPI-1)
- Tom Garretson, Northwestern (AP-1; UPI-1 [safety])
- Tom Sakal, Minnesota (AP-1; UPI-1)
- Ted Provost, Ohio State (AP-2; UPI-2)
- Steve Wilson, Iowa (AP-2; UPI-2 [safety])
- Tim Foley, Purdue (UPI-2)
- George Hoey, Michigan (AP-2)

== Key ==
AP = Associated Press, selected by a "board of sportswriters covering the Big Ten scene"

UPI = United Press International, selected by the conference coaches

Bold = Consensus first-team selection of both the AP and UPI

== See also ==
- 1967 College Football All-America Team
