= 1967 All-America college football team =

Official list of the best college football players of 1967

The 1967 All-America college football team is composed of college football players who were selected as All-Americans by various organizations that chose All-America college football teams in 1967.

The NCAA recognizes six selectors as "official" for the 1967 season. They are (1) the American Football Coaches Association (AFCA), (2) the Associated Press (AP), (3) the Central Press Association (CP), (4) the Football Writers Association of America (FWAA), (5) the Newspaper Enterprise Association (NEA), and (6) the United Press International (UPI). Four of the six teams (AP, UPI, NEA, and FWAA) were selected by polling of sports writers and/or broadcasters. The Central Press team was selected with input from the captains of the major college teams. The AFCA team was based on a poll of coaches. Other notable selectors, though not recognized by the NCAA as official, included Time magazine, The Sporting News (TSN), and the Walter Camp Football Foundation (WCFF).

== Consensus All-Americans ==
The NCAA recognizes 22 players as "consensus" All-Americans for the 1967 season. The following chart identifies the consensus All-Americans and displays which first-team designations they received.

Name	Position	School	Official selectors	Number	Others	Total
Gary Beban	Quarterback	UCLA	AFCA, AP, CP, FWAA, NEA, UPI	6/6	FN, Time, TSN, WCFF	10/10
Bob Johnson	Center	Tennessee	AFCA, AP, CP, FWAA, NEA, UPI	6/6	FN, Time, TSN, WCFF	10/10
Leroy Keyes	Running back	Purdue	AFCA, AP, CP, FWAA, NEA, UPI	6/6	FN, Time, TSN, WCFF	10/10
O. J. Simpson	Running back	USC	AFCA, AP, CP, FWAA, NEA, UPI	6/6	FN, Time, TSN, WCFF	10/10
Ron Yary	Tackle	USC	AFCA, AP, CP, FWAA, NEA, UPI	6/6	FN, Time, TSN, WCFF	10/10
Larry Csonka	Running back	Syracuse	AFCA, AP, CP, FWAA, NEA, UPI	6/6	FN, TSN, WCFF	9/10
Edgar Chandler	Tackle	Georgia	AFCA, AP, FWAA, NEA, UPI	5/6	FN, Time, TSN, WCFF	9/10
Dennis Byrd	Defensive tackle	North Carolina State	AFCA, AP, CP, FWAA, UPI	5/6	FN, Time, TSN, WCFF	9/10
Tom Schoen	Defensive back	Notre Dame	AFCA, AP, CP, FWAA, UPI	5/6	FN, Time, TSN, WCFF	9/10
Dennis Homan	End	Alabama	AFCA, AP, CP, FWAA, UPI	5/6	FN, TSN, WCFF	8/10
Ted Hendricks	Defensive end	Miami	AFCA, AP, CP, FWAA, NEA, UPI	6/6	FN, WCFF	8/10
Granville Liggins	Middle guard	Oklahoma	AFCA, AP, CP, FWAA, NEA, UPI	6/6	FN, WCFF	8/10
Adrian Young	Linebacker	USC	AFCA, AP, CP, FWAA, UPI	5/6	FN, TSN, WCFF	8/10
Wayne Meylan	Middle guard	Nebraska	AFCA, AP, CP, FWAA	4/6	FN, Time, TSN, WCFF	8/10
Frank Loria	Defensive back	Virginia Tech	AFCA, AP, FWAA, NEA, UPI	5/6	WCFF	6/10
Rich Stotter	Guard	Houston	AFCA, AP, CP, NEA, UPI	5/6	FN	6/10
Tim Rossovich	Defensive end	USC	AFCA, CP, FWAA, UPI	4/6	FN	5/10
Don Manning	Linebacker	UCLA	CP, NEA, UPI	3/6	FN, WCFF	5/10
Harry Olszewski	Guard	Clemson	AFCA, FWAA, UPI	3/6	WCFF	4/10
Ron Sellers	End	Florida State	AFCA, AP, NEA	3/6	FN	4/10
Bobby Johns	Defensive back	Alabama	AFCA, UPI	2/6	FN, WCFF	4/10
Dick Anderson	Defensive back	Colorado	AP, NEA	2/6	--	2/10

== Offensive selections ==
=== Ends ===
- Dennis Homan, Alabama (AFCA [split end], AP-1, CP-1, FWAA, NEA-2 [FL], UPI-1, FN, WCFF, TSN)
- Ron Sellers, Florida State (AFCA [flanker], AP-1, NEA-1 [split end], UPI-2, FN)
- Jim Seymour, Notre Dame (CP-1, UPI-1, FN, WCFF)
- Ted Kwalick, Penn State (AFCA, NEA-1 [tight end], UPI-2)
- Ken Hebert, Houston (FWAA, NEA-2 [split end])
- Haven Moses, San Diego State (TSN)
- Fred Hyatt, Auburn (FN)
- Gary Steele, Army (NEA-2 [tight end])
- Jim Beirne, Purdue (CP-2)
- Dick Trapp, Florida (CP-2)
- Rob Taylor, Navy (CP-3)
- Phil Odle, Brigham Young (CP-3)

=== Offensive tackles ===
- Ron Yary, USC (AFCA, AP-1, CP-1, FWAA, NEA-1, UPI-1, FN, WCFF, Time, TSN)
- Edgar Chandler, Georgia (AFCA, AP-1, CP-3, FWAA, NEA-1, UPI-1, FN, WCFF, Time, TSN)
- Larry Slagle, UCLA (CP-1)
- John Williams, Minnesota (Time)
- Russ Washington, Missouri (NEA-2)
- John Boynton, Tennessee (CP-2, NEA-2)
- Mo Moorman, Texas A&M (UPI-2)
- Bill Stanfill, Georgia (UPI-2)
- Mike Montler, Colorado (CP-2)
- Glenn Greenberg, Yale (CP-3)

=== Offensive guards ===
- Harry Olszewski, Clemson (AFCA, FWAA, NEA-2, UPI-1, WCFF)
- Rich Stotter, Houston (AFCA, AP-1, CP-1, NEA-1, UPI-1, FN)
- Gary Cassells, Indiana (AP-1, FWAA, UPI-2, WCFF)
- Phil Tucker, Texas Tech (NEA-1)
- Bob Kalsu, Oklahoma (CP-1)
- Willie Banks, Alcorn A&M (NEA-2)
- Barry Wilson, LSU (NEA-2)
- Bruce Gunstra, Northwestern (CP-2)
- Dick Swatland, Notre Dame (CP-2)
- Tony Conti, Michigan State (CP-3)
- Ray Phillips, Michigan (CP-3, UPI-2)

=== Centers ===
- Bob Johnson, Tennessee (College Football Hall of Fame) (AFCA, AP-1, CP-1, FWAA, NEA-1, UPI-1, FN, WCFF, Time, TSN)
- John Didion, Oregon State (UPI-2)
- Jon Kolb, Oklahoma State (CP-2)
- Joe Dayton, Michigan (CP-3)

=== Quarterbacks ===
- Gary Beban, UCLA (College Football Hall of Fame) (AFCA, AP-1, CP-1, FWAA, NEA-1, UPI-1, FN, WCFF, Time, TSN)
- Ken Stabler, Alabama (CP-2, NEA-2, FN)
- Mike Phipps, Purdue (FN)
- Kim Hammond, Florida State (UPI-2)
- Paul Toscano, Wyoming (CP-3)

=== Running backs ===
- O. J. Simpson, USC (College and Pro Football Halls of Fame) (AFCA, AP-1, CP-1 [halfback], FWAA, NEA, UPI-1 [halfback], FN, WCFF, Time, TSN)
- Leroy Keyes, Purdue (College Football of Fame) (AFCA, AP-1, CP-1 [halfback], FWAA, NEA-1 [FL], UPI-1 [halfback], FN, WCFF, Time, TSN)
- Larry Csonka, Syracuse (College and Pro Football Halls of Fame) (AFCA [fullback], AP-1 [fullback], CP-1 [fullback], FWAA, NEA-1, UPI-1 [fullback], FN [fullback], WCFF, TSN)
- Lee White, Weber State (FN [fullback], Time)
- Chris Gilbert, Texas (College Football Hall of Fame) (CP-2, NEA-2, UPI-2 [halfback], FN)
- Richmond Flowers Jr., Tennessee (FN)
- Jerry LeVias, SMU (FN)
- Ron Johnson, Michigan (College Football Hall of Fame) (CP-2)
- Butch Colson, East Carolina (CP-2)
- Larry Smith, Florida (NEA-2, CP-3)
- Warren McVea, Houston (UPI-2 [halfback], FN)
- Bill Enyart, Oregon State (UPI-2 [fullback])
- Vic Gatto, Harvard (CP-3)
- Perry Williams, Purdue (CP-3)

== Defensive selections ==
=== Defensive ends ===
- Ted Hendricks, Miami (AFCA, AP-1, CP-1, FWAA, NEA-1, UPI-1, FN [end], WCFF)
- Tim Rossovich, USC (AFCA, CP-1, FWAA, NEA-2, UPI-1, FN)
- Bob Stein, Minnesota (FWAA, NEA-1, UPI-2, CP-3, WCFF)
- Claude Humphrey, Tennessee State (Time, TSN)
- John Garlington, LSU (AFCA, UPI-2)
- Bill Dow, Navy (CP-2)
- George Foussekis, VPI (CP-3)

=== Defensive tackles ===
- Dennis Byrd, North Carolina State (AFCA, AP-1, CP-1, FWAA, NEA-2, UPI-1, WCFF, Time, TSN)
- Kevin Hardy, Notre Dame (AP-1 [defensive end], CP-2 [defensive end], NEA-2 [defensive end], UPI-1, FN, WCFF, Time, TSN)
- Bill Staley, Utah State (CP-1, NEA-2, UPI-2, FN, Time, TSN)
- Mike Dirks, Wyoming (FWAA, NEA-1)
- Jess Lewis, Oregon State (NEA-1)
- Russ Washington, Missouri (TSN)
- Jon Sandstrom, Oregon State (AFCA)
- Jim Urbanek, Mississippi (CP-2, UPI-2, FN)
- Doug Crusan, Indiana (CP-2)
- Dick Himes, Ohio State (CP-3)
- Ray Norton, Boston Univ. (CP-3)

=== Middle guards ===
- Granville Liggins, Oklahoma (AFCA [guard], AP-1, CP-1 [guard], FWAA, NEA-1, UPI-1, FN, WCFF)
- Wayne Meylan, Nebraska (AFCA [linebacker], AP [linebacker], CP-1 [guard], FWAA, NEA-2 [middle guard], UPI-2 [middle guard], FN, WCFF, Time, TSN)
- Curley Culp, Arizona State (CP-2 [guard], FN, Time, TSN)
- Greg Pipes, Baylor (AFCA [guard], AP-1 [defensive tackle])
- George Dames, Oregon (CP-2 [guard])
- Bob Foyle, Duke (CP-3 [guard])
- Carl Garber, Missouri (CP-3 [guard])

=== Linebackers ===
- Adrian Young, USC (AFCA, AP-1, CP-1, FWAA, NEA-2, UPI-1, WCFF, TSN)
- Don Manning, UCLA (CP-1, NEA-1, UPI-1, FN, WCFF)
- Fred Carr, UTEP (NEA-1, CP-2, Time, TSN)
- Corbin Robertson, Texas (FWAA, NEA-2)
- Bill Hobbs, Texas A&M (AP-1)
- D.D. Lewis, Mississippi State (NEA-1, UPI-2)
- Tom Beutler, Toledo (CP-1)
- Mike McGill, Notre Dame (Time)
- John Pergine, Notre Dame (CP-3, UPI-2)
- Don Chiafaro, Harvard (CP-2)
- Danny Lankas, Kansas State (CP-2)
- Tony Kyasky, Syracuse (CP-3)
- Ken Kaczmarek, Indiana (CP-3)

=== Defensive backs ===
- Tom Schoen, Notre Dame (AFCA, AP-1, CP-1, FWAA, UPI-1, FN, WCFF, Time, TSN)
- Frank Loria, Virginia Tech (AFCA, AP-1, FWAA, NEA-1 [safety], UPI-1, WCFF)
- Dick Anderson, Colorado (AP-1, NEA-1, UPI-2)
- Bobby Johns, Alabama (AFCA, CP-2, UPI-1, FN, WCFF)
- Jim Smith, Oregon (CP-3, NEA-1, UPI-2, Time, TSN)
- Major Hazelton, Florida A. & M. (Time, TSN)
- Charlie West, UTEP (NEA-2, Time, TSN)
- Harry Cheatwood, Oklahoma State (CP-1)
- Fred Combs, North Carolina State (FWAA, UPI-2)
- Al Dorsey, Tennessee (UPI-1, FN)
- Mike Battle, USC (CP-3, UPI-2)
- Neal Starkey, Air Force (CP-2)

== Special teams ==
=== Kicker ===
- Jerry DePoyster, Wyoming (AP-1, FN, TSN)

=== Punter ===
- Zenon Andrusyshyn, UCLA (TSN)

== Key ==
- **Bold** – Consensus All-American
- -1 – First-team selection
- -2 – Second-team selection
- -3 – Third-team selection

=== Official selectors ===
- AFCA = American Football Coaches Association, separate offensive units based on votes from nearly 700 coaches
- AP = Associated Press, "selected on the basis of recommendations from the Top Ten AP football boards in each of the eight [NCAA] districts"
- CP = Central Press Association, first-, second- and third-teams selected "with the aid of the major college football captains, who were polled by ballot"
- FWAA = Football Writers Association of America
- NEA = Newspaper Enterprise Association
- UPI = United Press International, first- and second-team squads "chosen by direct vote of 207 sportswriters and broadcasters throughout the nation, the only honor squad so chosen"

=== Unofficial selectors ===
- FN = The Football News, consisting of the 34 best college football players as selected by the correspondents and staff of The Football News
- Time = Time magazine
- TSN = The Sporting News
- WC = Walter Camp Football Foundation

== See also ==
- 1967 All-Atlantic Coast Conference football team
- 1967 All-Big Eight Conference football team
- 1967 All-Big Ten Conference football team
- 1967 All-Pacific-8 Conference football team
- 1967 All-SEC football team
- 1967 All-Southwest Conference football team
