= Wayne Mass =

American football player (1946–2019)

No. 74, 78, 75
- Position: Offensive tackle

Personal information
- Born: March 11, 1946; Portales, New Mexico, U.S.
- Died: July 4, 2019 (aged 73); Durango, Colorado, U.S.
- Listed height: 6 ft 4 in (1.93 m)
- Listed weight: 240 lb (109 kg)

Career information
- High school: Edmunds (Sumter, South Carolina)
- College: Clemson (1964–1967)
- NFL draft: 1968: 4th round, 99th overall pick

Career history
- Chicago Bears (1968–1970); Miami Dolphins (1971); New England Patriots (1972); Philadelphia Eagles (1972)

Awards and highlights
- First-team All-American (1966); 2× First-team All-ACC (1966, 1967)

Career NFL statistics
- Games played: 59
- Games started: 21
- Stats at Pro Football Reference

Wayne R. Mass (March 11, 1946 – July 4, 2019) was an American professional football offensive tackle who played five seasons in the National Football League (NFL) with the Chicago Bears, Miami Dolphins, New England Patriots and Philadelphia Eagles. He was selected by the Bears in the fourth round of the 1968 NFL/AFL draft after playing college football at Clemson University.

== Early life and college ==
Wayne R. Mass as born on March 11, 1946, in Portales, New Mexico. He attended Edmunds High School in Sumter, South Carolina.

Mass was a member of the Clemson Tigers of Clemson University from 1964 to 1967 and a three-year letterman from 1965 to 1967. He earned Associated Press first-team All-Atlantic Coast Conference honors in both 1966 and 1967. In 1966, he garnered American Football Coaches Association first-team All-American, Central Press Association second-team All-American, and United Press International second-team All-American recognition. Mass was inducted into Clemson's athletics hall of fame in 1993.

== Professional career ==
Mass was selected by the Chicago Bears in the fourth round, with the 99th overall pick, of the 1968 NFL draft. He played in all 14 games, starting five, for the Bears during his rookie year in 1968. He appeared in 11 games, starting two, in 1969. Mass started all 14 games for Chicago during the 1970 season as the Bears went 6–8. He was waived by the Bears on September 14, 1971.

Mass was then claimed off waivers by the Miami Dolphins. He played in 11 games for the Dolphins during the 1971 season.

On August 25, 1972, Mass was traded to the New England Patriots for an undisclosed 1973 draft pick. He appeared in six games for the Patriots before being waived on October 26, 1972. Mass was critical of the Patriots coaching staff after being released. Patriots center Jon Morris stated, in reply to Mass, "Do you know what we said about Wayne Mass? We said if you were looking for the most direct route to the Patriots' quarterback, why not pay a dime and take the Mass Turnpike?"

Mass was signed to the taxi squad of the Philadelphia Eagles on November 1, 1972. He was later promoted to the active roster and played in three games for the Eagles during the 1972 season. He was waived on April 21, 1973.

== Personal life ==
On December 13, 1973, Mass was stabbed once in the chest by two men while he was attempting to write down the license plate of a vehicle fleeing an automobile accident. He died of a heart attack on July 4, 2019, in Durango, Colorado.
