= 1967 All-Atlantic Coast Conference football team =

The 1967 All-Atlantic Coast Conference football team consists of American football players chosen by various selectors for their All-Atlantic Coast Conference ("ACC") teams for the 1967 NCAA University Division football season. Selectors in 1967 included the Associated Press (AP).

== All-Atlantic Coast Conference selections ==
=== Offensive selections ===
==== Ends ====
- Harry Martell, NC State (AP)
- Rick Decker, Wake Forest (AP)

==== Offensive tackles ====
- Wayne Mass, Clemson (AP)
- Greg Shelly, Virginia (AP)

==== Offensive guards ====
- Harry Olszewski, Clemson (AP)
- Norman Cates, NC State (AP)

==== Centers ====
- Mike Murphy, Duke (AP)

==== Backs ====
- Buddy Gore, Clemson (AP)
- Frank Quayle, Virginia (AP)
- Wayne Muir, South Carolina (AP)
- Freddie Summers, Wake Forest (AP)

=== Defensive selections ===
==== Defensive ends ====
- Mark Capuano, NC State (AP)
- Ronnie Duckworth, Clemson (AP)

==== Defensive tackles ====
- Dennis Byrd, NC State (AP)
- Don Somma, South Carolina (AP)

==== Middle guards ====
- Bob Foyle, Duke (AP)

==== Linebackers ====
- Jimmy Catoe, Clemson (AP)
- Tim Bice, South Carolina (AP)

==== Defensive backs ====
- Freddie Combs, NC State (AP)
- Andy Beath, Duke (AP)
- Frank Liberatore, Clemson (AP)
- Jack Davenport, North Carolina (AP)

=== Special teams ===
==== Kickers ====
- Gerald Warren, NC State (AP)

== Key ==
AP = Associated Press

== See also ==
- 1967 College Football All-America Team
