= Frank Loria =

American football player (1947–1970)

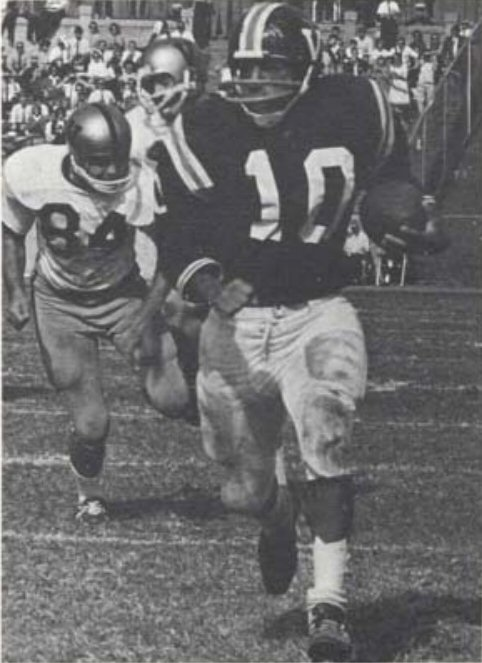
- Frank Loria returns a punt for a touchdown in VPI's 1966 game against Vanderbilt.

Biographical details
- Born: January 6, 1947; Clarksburg, West Virginia, U.S.
- Died: November 14, 1970 (aged 23); Kenova, West Virginia, U.S.

Playing career
- 1965–1967: Virginia Tech
- Positions: Safety, punt returner

Coaching career (HC unless noted)
- 1970: Marshall (DB)

Accomplishments and honors

Awards
- Consensus All-American (1967); First-team All-American (1966); Virginia Tech Hokies No. 10 retired; Virginia Sports Hall of Fame
- College Football Hall of Fame; Inducted in 1999 (profile)

Frank Paul Loria (January 6, 1947 – November 14, 1970) was an All American football defensive back at Virginia Tech. He was born in the town of Clarksburg, West Virginia, and was a three sport athlete at Notre Dame Catholic High School.

== Career ==
Loria played college football for the Virginia Tech Hokies football team from 1965 to 1967, helping the Hokies to a berth in the 1966 Liberty Bowl. He was named 1st Team AP All American in 1966. He was named consensus All-American in 1967. He was named to the top six All-America 1st teams. Loria started all 31 varsity games that he was eligible to play in. He was known for being a physical hitter and for his quickness. He also had a "sixth sense;" an uncanny ability to diagnose plays and pass patterns.

Loria played safety in the same defensive backfield with Frank Beamer, former head coach at Virginia Tech. It is indicative of Loria's stature, as well as Beamer's humility, that when Beamer was once asked if he ever thought about "what if" Loria had not been killed in a plane crash, he replied that he thought it was possible that Loria might be the coach at Tech, and that he himself might be an assistant.

During the 1966 season, in a game against Kentucky, the Hokies were ahead 7-0 in the 1st quarter. Kentucky was on the 4-yard line trying to tie the score. Loria sacked Kentucky quarterback Roger Walz for a two-yard loss. This was significant in preventing Kentucky from scoring.

In October 1966, against a ranked Florida State team, Loria returned a punt 80 yards for a touchdown that proved to be significant in a 23-21 Virginia Tech victory. He also made the game-deciding 4th down tackle on a FSU running back on the goal line.

During the 1966 season, William & Mary was driving for the game-winning touchdown. Loria made a critical 4th-quarter interception that preserved the victory for Virginia Tech by a score of 20-18.

In December 1966, the 8-1-1 Virginia Tech Hokies faced the 9th-ranked 7-2-1 Miami Hurricanes in the Liberty Bowl. The Hokies were a ten-point underdog to the Hurricanes. Loria played a great game defensively, as every time a Hurricane running back hit the line, he was there to meet him. His efforts allowed Virginia Tech to hold Miami to just 16 yards of offense during the 1st half. The Hokies lost 7-14 to the Miami Hurricanes.

During the 1966 season, Loria returned punts 80, 65, and 80 yards for touchdowns. Defensively, he had three interceptions on the year.

During the 1967 season, Loria returned a punt 95 yards for a touchdown against the Miami Hurricanes. This still stands as the longest punt return in Virginia Tech history. Loria also intercepted three passes on the season and ranked 8th nationally in punt returns.

Against Kansas State during the 1967 season, Loria intercepted a pass, recovered a fumble, made two touchdown saving tackles, deflected a touchdown pass and had a quarterback sack for a 9-yard loss.

Loria joined the Marshall University coaching staff as the defensive backs coach.

== Death ==
Loria died in the airplane crash that killed most of Marshall's football team, on November 14, 1970.

== Awards and recognition ==
His number, #10, is one of only four numbers in football retired by Virginia Tech. Loria was inducted into the College Football Hall of Fame on December 7, 1999, along with the man he played for, former Virginia Tech coach, the late Jerry Claiborne. The local Clarksburg Columbian Club honors his memory every year by hosting the Frank Loria Dinner, which the first team All Harrison County football players attend. The Loria Award is given to the most outstanding high school football player in the county. Notable guest speakers at the dinner have been Frank Beamer, former Marshall coach Red Dawson, WVU football coach Bill Stewart, and WVU basketball coach Bob Huggins.

In 1984, Loria was inducted into the Virginia Sports Hall of Fame (the state-wide organization that recognizes athletic achievements by state natives, or who those who played or coached for teams in the state). He was elected to the inaugural class of the Virginia Tech Sports Hall of Fame in 1982.

== Bibliography ==
- Turn Up the Wick by Frank Beamer with Chris Colston
- Greatest Moments in Virginia Tech Football History by Francis J. Fitzgerald
