= 1968 All-Big Ten Conference football team =

American college football all-star team

The 1968 All-Big Ten Conference football team consists of American football players chosen by various organizations for All-Big Ten Conference teams for the 1968 Big Ten Conference football season.

== Offensive selections ==
=== Quarterbacks ===
- Dennis Brown, Michigan (AP-1; UPI-1)
- Harry Gonso, Indiana (AP-2; UPI-2)

=== Running backs ===
- Ron Johnson, Michigan (AP-1; UPI-1)
- Leroy Keyes, Purdue (AP-1; UPI-1)
- Ed Podolak, Iowa (AP-1; UPI-2)
- Perry Williams, Purdue (UPI-1)
- Rich Johnson, Illinois (AP-2; UPI-2)
- Rex Kern, Ohio State (AP-2)
- Jim Otis, Ohio State (AP-2)
- John Isenbarger, Indiana (UPI-2)

=== Ends ===
- Jade Butcher, Indiana (AP-1; UPI-1)
- Jim Mandich, Michigan (AP-1; UPI-1)
- Bruce Jankowski, Ohio State (AP-2)
- Ray Parson, Minnesota (AP-2)
- Al Bream, Iowa (UPI-2)

=== Tackles ===
- Rufus Mayes, Ohio State (AP-1; UPI-1)
- Dave Foley, Ohio State (AP-1; UPI-1)
- Clanton King, Purdue (AP-2; UPI-2)
- Dan Dierdorf, Michigan (AP-2)
- Ezell Jones, Minnesota (UPI-2)

=== Guards ===
- Gary Roberts, Purdue (AP-1; UPI-1)
- Jon Meskimen, Iowa (AP-1; UPI-2)
- Dick Enderle, Minnesota (UPI-1)
- Stan Broadnax, Michigan (AP-2)
- Ron Saul, Ohio State (AP-2)
- Angelo Loukas, Northwestern (UPI-2)

=== Centers ===
- Jack Rudnay, Northwestern (AP-1; UPI-1)
- Mike Frame, Northwestern (AP-2; UPI-2)

== Defensive selections ==
=== Ends ===
- Phil Seymour, Michigan (AP-1; UPI-1)
- Bob Stein, Minnesota (AP-1; UPI-1)
- Dave Whitfield, Ohio State (AP-2; UPI-2)
- Tom Bilunas, Indiana (AP-2)
- Bill McCoy, Purdue (UPI-2)

=== Tackles ===
- Charles Bailey, Michigan State (AP-1)
- Tom Goss, Michigan (AP-1)
- Bill Yanchar, Purdue (UPI-1)
- Paul Schmidlin, Ohio State (AP-2; UPI-2)
- Henry Hill, Michigan (AP-2)
- Ron Kamzelski, Minnesota (UPI-2)

=== Middle guard ===
- Chuck Kyle, Purdue (AP-1; UPI-1 [tackle])
- Jim Stillwagon, Ohio State (UPI-2)

=== Linebackers ===
- Ken Criter, Wisconsin (AP-1; UPI-1)
- Jack Tatum, Ohio State (AP-1; UPI-1)
- Noel Jenke, Minnesota (AP-1; UPI-2)
- Tom Stincic, Michigan (UPI-1)
- Rich Saul, Michigan State (AP-2 [middle guard]; UPI-2)
- Mark Stier, Ohio State (AP-2; UPI-2)
- Jim Sniadecki, Indiana (AP-2)
- Bob Yunaska, Purdue (AP-2)

=== Defensive backs ===
- Al Brenner, Michigan State (AP-1; UPI-1; UPI-2 [offensive end])
- Tom Curtis, Michigan (AP-1; UPI-1)
- Ted Provost, Ohio State (AP-1; UPI-2)
- Nate Cunningham, Indiana (UPI-1)
- Dennis White, Northwestern (AP-2; UPI-2)
- Doug Roalstad, Minnesota (AP-2)
- Steve Wilson, Iowa (AP-2)
- Mike Sensibaugh, Ohio State (UPI-2)

== Key ==
AP = Associated Press (AP), selected by a "board of sportswriters covering the Big Ten scene"

UPI = United Press International (UPI), selected by the league's coaches

Bold = Consensus first-team selection of both the AP and UPI

== See also ==
- 1968 College Football All-America Team
