= Jack Rudnay =

American football player (born 1947)

No. 58
- Position: Center

Personal information
- Born: November 20, 1947 (age 78); Cleveland, Ohio, U.S.
- Listed height: 6 ft 3 in (1.91 m)
- Listed weight: 240 lb (109 kg)

Career information
- High school: Kenston (Chagrin Falls, Ohio)
- College: Northwestern
- NFL draft: 1969: 4th round, 101st overall pick

Career history
- Kansas City Chiefs (1969–1982)

Awards and highlights
- Super Bowl champion (IV); 4× All-Pro (1973–1975, 1979); 4× Pro Bowl (1973–1976); Kansas City Chiefs Hall of Fame; First-team All-Big Ten (1968); Second-team All-Big Ten (1967)

Career NFL statistics
- Games played: 178
- Games started: 171
- Fumble recoveries: 7
- Stats at Pro Football Reference

John Carl Rudnay (born November 20, 1947) is an American former professional football player who spent his entire 13-year career as a center for the Kansas City Chiefs of the National Football League (NFL). He played college football for the Northwestern Wildcats.

== Early life ==
Rudnay graduated in 1965 from Kenston High School in Geauga County southeast of Cleveland. He graduated from Northwestern University in Evanston, Illinois in 1969. While at Northwestern, He became a member of the Sigma Chi fraternity.

== Professional football career ==
Rudnay was a fourth-round draft choice in 1969 for the American Football League's Kansas City Chiefs. He missed the Chiefs' championship season as a result of a back injury suffered in the College All-Star Game following his senior year at Northwestern, where he had played both center and defensive tackle.

Though drafted to an AFL team, he never played in an American Football League game, his first season being 1970, after the Chiefs joined the NFL. He went on to play 144 straight games and 178 games in all with the Chiefs, the third most ever by a Kansas City offensive lineman, and was regarded as one of the finest centers in the National Football League during the 1970s. He was the American Football Conference's starting center in the Pro Bowl following the 1973–1976 seasons.

== Business career ==
Rudnay has served as the chief executive officer of the Stone Manufacturing and Supply Company, a Kansas City-based veterinarians equipment and supply company.

== See also ==
- Other American Football League players
