= Harry Olszewski =

American football player (1946–1998)

No. 51
- Position: Guard

Personal information
- Born: October 11, 1946; Baltimore, Maryland, U.S.
- Died: April 27, 1998 (aged 51); Fort Lauderdale, Florida, U.S.
- Listed height: 5 ft 11 in (1.80 m)
- Listed weight: 245 lb (111 kg)

Career information
- High school: Baltimore (MD) Poly
- College: Clemson
- NFL draft: 1968: 3rd round, 64th overall pick

Career history
- Las Vegas Cowboys (1968); Alabama Hawks (1968); Montreal Alouettes (1969–1970)

Awards and highlights
- Grey Cup champion (1970); Consensus All-American (1967); 2× First-team All-ACC (1966, 1967)

Harry Lee Thomas Olszewski (October 11, 1946 – April 27, 1998) was an American football offensive lineman. He was selected in the third round of the 1968 NFL Draft by the Cleveland Browns. He played college football at Clemson University and was a consensus All-American in 1967.
