= 1966 All-Atlantic Coast Conference football team =

American college football all-star team

The 1966 All-Atlantic Coast Conference football team consists of American football players chosen by various selectors for their All-Atlantic Coast Conference ("ACC") teams for the 1966 NCAA University Division football season. Selectors in 1966 included the Associated Press (AP).

== All-Atlantic Coast Conference selections ==
=== Offensive selections ===
==== Ends ====
- Dave Dunaway, Duke (AP)
- Ed Carrington, Virginia (AP)

==== Offensive tackles ====
- Wayne Mass, Clemson (AP)
- Bill Gentry, NC State (AP)

==== Offensive guards ====
- Harry Olszewski, Clemson (AP)
- John Stec, NC State (AP)

==== Centers ====
- Bob Eplinger, Wake Forest (AP)

==== Backs ====
- Bob Davis, Virginia (AP)
- Gary Rowe, NC State (AP)
- Don DeArment, NC State (AP)
- Jimmy Addison, Clemson (AP)

=== Defensive selections ===
==== Defensive ends ====
- Butch Sursavage, Clemson (AP)
- Dick Absher, Maryland (AP)

==== Defensive tackles ====
- Dennis Byrd, NC State (AP)
- Bob Grant, Wake Forest (AP)

==== Middle guards ====
- Bob Foyle, Duke (AP)

==== Linebackers ====
- Bob Matheson, Duke (AP)
- Dave Everett, NC State (AP)

==== Defensive backs ====
- Bobby Bryant, South Carolina (AP)
- Wayne Page, Clemson (AP)
- Art McMahon, NC State (AP)
- Andy Harper, Wake Forest (AP)

== Key ==
AP = Associated Press

== See also ==
- 1966 College Football All-America Team
