= Silas McKinnie =

Canadian football player

Profile
- Positions: Halfback, Running back

Personal information
- Born: January 24, 1946 (age 80); Detroit, Michigan, U.S.
- Listed height: 6 ft 2 in (1.88 m)
- Listed weight: 210 lb (95 kg)

Career information
- College: Iowa

Career history
- 1968–1971: Saskatchewan Roughriders
- 1973: Calgary Stampeders

Awards and highlights
- CFL West All-Star (1970); Second-team All-Big Ten (1967)

Silas McKinnie (born January 24, 1946) is an American-born Canadian football player who played professionally for the Saskatchewan Roughriders and Calgary Stampeders.
