= Rich Stotter =

American football player (1945–2015)

No. 68
- Position: Linebacker

Personal information
- Born: April 5, 1945; Cleveland, Ohio, U.S.
- Died: May 4, 2015 (aged 70)
- Listed height: 6 ft 0 in (1.83 m)
- Listed weight: 225 lb (102 kg)

Career information
- High school: Shaker Heights (Shaker Heights, Ohio)
- College: Houston (1964–1967)
- NFL draft: 1968: 14th round, 376th overall pick

Career history
- Houston Oilers (1968)

Awards and highlights
- Consensus All-American (1967)
- Stats at Pro Football Reference

Richard Lee Stotter (April 5, 1945 – May 4, 2015) was an American professional football linebacker who played one season with the Houston Oilers of the American Football League (AFL). He was selected by the Oilers in the fourteenth round of the 1968 NFL/AFL draft after playing college football at the University of Houston. He was a consensus All-American in 1967.

== Early life and college ==
Richard Lee Stotter was born on April 5, 1945, in Cleveland, Ohio. He attended Shaker Heights High School in Shaker Heights, Ohio.

Stotter was a member of the Houston Cougars of the University of Houston from 1964 to 1967 and a three-year letterman from 1965 to 1967. He was a consensus All-American in 1967 as an offensive guard. Stotter was the first consensus All-American in school history. He was also an Academic All-American in 1967. He was inducted into the University of Houston's athletics hall of fame in 2000.

== Professional career ==
Stotter was selected by the Houston Oilers in the 14th round, with the 376th overall pick, of the 1968 NFL/AFL draft. He played in three games for the Oilers during the 1968 season and was listed as a linebacker. He was released on September 1, 1969.

== Personal life ==
Stotter died on May 4, 2015, at age 70. The University of Houston then announced that it's lineman of the year award would be named the Rich Stotter Lineman of the Year Award. He was Jewish.
