= Jim Sniadecki =

American football player (born 1947)

No. 58
- Position: Linebacker

Personal information
- Born: March 23, 1947 (age 79); South Bend, Indiana, U.S.
- Listed height: 6 ft 2 in (1.88 m)
- Listed weight: 230 lb (104 kg)

Career information
- High school: St. Joseph (South Bend)
- College: Indiana (1965-1968)
- NFL draft: 1969: 4th round, 86th overall pick

Career history
- San Francisco 49ers (1969–1973); St. Louis Cardinals (1974)*; The Hawaiians (1974-1975)
- * Offseason or practice squad member only

Awards and highlights
- Second-team All-American (1968); First-team All-Big Ten (1967); 2× Second-team All-Big Ten (1966, 1968)

Career NFL statistics
- Fumble recoveries: 8
- Interceptions: 1
- Sacks: 1
- Stats at Pro Football Reference

James Bert Sniadecki (born March 23, 1947) is an American former professional football player who was a linebacker for five seasons with the San Francisco 49ers of the National Football League (NFL). He played college football for the Indiana Hoosiers. He finished his pro playing career with The Hawaiians of the rival World Football League (WFL) in 1975.
