= Ezell Jones =

American football player (born 1947)

- Jones, 1968

No. 74
- Position: Offensive tackle

Personal information
- Born: July 11, 1947 (age 79); Collierville, Tennessee, U.S.
- Listed height: 6 ft 4 in (1.93 m)
- Listed weight: 255 lb (116 kg)

Career information
- High school: Melrose (Memphis, Tennessee)
- College: Minnesota (1965-1968)
- NFL draft: 1969: 4th round, 104th overall pick

Career history
- New York Jets (1969)*; Boston Patriots (1969-1970); Toronto Argonauts (1971)*
- * Offseason or practice squad member only

Awards and highlights
- Second-team All-Big Ten (1968)

Career NFL/AFL statistics
- Games played: 18
- Fumble recoveries: 1
- Stats at Pro Football Reference

Ezell M. "Easy" Jones (born July 11, 1947) is an American former professional football player who was a tackle for the Boston Patriots of the American Football League (AFL) and National Football League (NFL) in 1969 and 1970. He played college football for the Minnesota Golden Gophers from 1966 to 1968.

== Early life ==
Jones was born in Collierville, Tennessee, in 1947. He attended Melrose High School in Memphis. He moved to Los Angeles and attended high school there during his junior year, then returned to Memphis for his senior year. He earned all-city, all-state and All-America prep honors at Melrose High. He graduated from high school in 1965.

== Minnesota ==
Jones played college football for the Minnesota Golden Gophers from 1966 to 1968. He played on both offense and defense as a sophomore, but played only on offense in 1967 and 1968. He sustained a neck injury in the 1968 season opener, but he came back from the injury. He was named UPI's Midwest Linemen of the Week in November 1968 after his blocking helped Minnesota tally over 300 rushing yards against Purdue. He was also an honors student in mathematics and received first-team honors on the 1967 Big Ten all-academic team.

== Professional football ==
Jones was selected by the New York Jets in the fourth round (104th overall pick) of the 1969 NFL/AFL draft. He signed with the Jets in May 1969, but was traded to the Boston Patriots in August 1969 in exchange for a future draft pick. He appeared in 18 games for the Patriots during the 1969 and 1970 seasons.

Jones was released by the Patriots after the 1970 season and signed with the Toronto Argonauts of the Canadian Football League in March 1971. He was released by the Argonauts in July 1971.
