= Norm Hodgins =

American football player (born 1952)

No. 34
- Position: Defensive back

Personal information
- Born: March 1, 1952 (age 74); New Orleans, Louisiana, U.S.
- Listed height: 6 ft 1 in (1.85 m)
- Listed weight: 190 lb (86 kg)

Career information
- High school: Rummel (New Orleans)
- College: LSU
- NFL draft: 1974: 11th round, 264th overall pick

Career history
- Chicago Bears (1974)
- Stats at Pro Football Reference

Norman Francis Hodgins Jr. (born March 1, 1952) is an American former professional football player who was a defensive back for one season with the Chicago Bears of the National Football League (NFL). He played college football as a wide receiver for the LSU Tigers, scoring one touchdown in 1973. He played 14 games in the NFL for the Bears in 1974 and had three fumble recoveries.

Hodgins was born in New Orleans and attended Archbishop Rummel High School.
