= Perry Williams (running back) =

American football player (born 1946)

No. 31, 36
- Position: Running back

Personal information
- Born: December 11, 1946 (age 79); Cincinnati, Ohio, U.S.
- Listed height: 6 ft 2 in (1.88 m)
- Listed weight: 219 lb (99 kg)

Career information
- High school: Withrow (Cincinnati)
- College: Purdue
- NFL draft: 1969: 4th round, 90th overall pick

Career history
- Green Bay Packers (1969–1973); Chicago Bears (1974)

Awards and highlights
- Third-team All-American (1967); 2× First-team All-Big Ten (1967, 1968)

Career NFL statistics
- Rushing yards: 547
- Rushing average: 3.1
- Receptions: 37
- Receiving yards: 285
- Total touchdowns: 2
- Stats at Pro Football Reference

Perry Andrew Williams (born December 11, 1946) is an American former professional football player who was a running back in the National Football League (NFL). He played college football for the Purdue Boilermakers and was selected by the Green Bay Packers in the fourth round of the 1969 NFL/AFL draft.

Williams is currently ranked high on the Boilermakers' career rushing charts; 8th in attempts (514), 11th in yards (2,049), 4th in rushing touchdowns (30), 5th in total touchdowns (31) and 14th in points (174). In July 2013, Williams was touted as the No. 7 running back in Purdue history.

Williams finished in the top ten of eight offensive categories during his Purdue career; leading the Big Ten Conference in touchdowns and rushing attempts as a sophomore.

== 1966 season ==
As a sophomore, Williams led the Boilermakers in rushing (750 yds), total yardage (844 yds) and touchdowns (11). He scored both Purdue touchdowns in the Boilermakers' 14-13 victory over USC in the 1967 Rose Bowl. The Boilermakers finished with a record of 9-2 and Top Ten ranking.

== 1967 season ==
During the 1967 season, Williams at fullback teamed with Leroy Keyes at halfback and Mike Phipps at quarterback to lead the Boilermakers to a record of 8-2, a season high ranking of No. 2 and a win vs. No. 1 Notre Dame.

Williams was named 1st Team All-Big Ten in 1967.

== 1968 season ==
The 1968 season was nearly identical to the 1967 season. The Boilermakers were 8-2 again, Phipps, Keyes and Williams highlighted the offensive attack; the Boilermakers spent 4 weeks as the No. 1 team in the country. Williams was named 1st Team All-Big Ten in 1968.

Following his Purdue career, Williams was named to the 1968 East-West Shrine Game in San Francisco, CA and the 1968 All-American All-Star game in Tampa, FL.

Williams played for the Green Bay Packers from 1969 to 1973 and the Chicago Bears in 1974 and then moved to the World Football League and spent the 1975 season with the San Antonio Wings.
