= Cliff Taylor (American football) =

American football player (1952–2010)

No. 22, 27
- Position: Running back

Personal information
- Born: May 10, 1952; Memphis, Tennessee, U.S.
- Died: March 23, 2010 (aged 57)
- Listed height: 5 ft 11 in (1.80 m)
- Listed weight: 198 lb (90 kg)

Career information
- High school: South Side (Memphis)
- College: Memphis State (1970–1973)
- NFL draft: 1974: 3rd round, 62nd overall pick

Career history
- Chicago Bears (1974); Green Bay Packers (1976)

Career NFL statistics
- Rushing attempts: 23
- Rushing yards: 65
- Touchdowns: 2
- Receptions: 5
- Receiving yards: 44
- Kick returns: 30
- Stats at Pro Football Reference

Clifton Durett Taylor Jr. (May 10, 1952 – March 23, 2010) was an American professional football running back. He played college football for the Memphis State Tigers and was selected by the Chicago Bears in the third round of the 1974 NFL draft. He played one season for the Bears and later a season with the Green Bay Packers in 1976 before retiring.

== Early life ==
Taylor was born on May 10, 1952, in Memphis, Tennessee. His brother, Ed Taylor, also played in the NFL. He attended South Side High School in Memphis where he competed in football and track and field. In football, he played as a running back and was selected first-team all-state, All-Memphis and All-Mid-South as a senior after helping South Side to a 10–1–1 record and a second-place finish at the state championships. He gained over 100 yards in all but two games that season. Taylor also excelled in track, being one of the top sprinters in the Mid-South. He was a state champion in the 100- and 200-yard dash, setting a state record in the former with a time of 9.7 seconds. He signed to play college football for the Memphis State Tigers.

== College career ==
Taylor attended Memphis State from 1970 to 1973, where he played alongside his brother Ed. He missed the entirety of his freshman season due to a knee injury suffered in fall camp. He then played at fullback as a sophomore in 1971, helping Memphis State to the Pasadena Bowl and the Missouri Valley Conference (MVC) title while running 39 times for 117 yards and three touchdowns. His 1971 season included a game against North Texas State where he ran for 104 yards and 2 touchdowns. The following season, he ran for 196 yards and 2 touchdowns while recording 16 receptions for 183 yards. He served as starting fullback as a senior in 1973, running 120 times for 471 yards and 7 touchdowns while also catching 14 passes for 69 yards, being Memphis State's second-leading scorer.

== Professional career ==
Taylor was selected by the Chicago Bears in the third round (62nd overall) of the 1974 NFL draft. He was also selected in the fifth round (49th overall) of the 1974 WFL Draft by the Houston Texans. He signed with the Bears in March 1974. He appeared in all 14 games for the Bears, serving as their kick returner while also seeing limited use as a running back. He ran nine times for 18 yards and a touchdown, caught three passes for 23 yards, and returned 27 kickoffs for 567 yards. Taylor performed well for the Bears in preseason in 1975, scoring three of their last four touchdowns, but was nevertheless released prior to the regular season. He then underwent foot surgery for a tendon issue and sat out the 1975 season. Taylor signed with the Green Bay Packers in April 1976. He made the team and appeared in seven games, running 14 times for 47 yards and a touchdown, catching two passes for 21 yards, and returning three kickoffs for 59 yards. In his last game, he suffered a knee injury that required surgery and ended his season. He retired from professional football in July 1977. In his career, he appeared in 21 games and ran 23 times for 63 yards, caught five passes for 44 yards and returned 30 kickoffs for 626 yards.

== Later life and death ==
After his retirement, Taylor worked for Chevrolet in Memphis and for Infiniti. Taylor was inducted into the Memphis M Club Hall of Fame in 1987. He was married and had two children. He died on March 23, 2010, at the age of 57.
