= Dave Gagnon (American football) =

American football player (born 1951)

No. 29
- Position: Running back

Personal information
- Born: January 17, 1951 (age 75); Garden City, Michigan
- Listed height: 5 ft 10 in (1.78 m)
- Listed weight: 210 lb (95 kg)

Career information
- High school: Wayne St. Mary
- College: Ferris State
- NFL draft: 1974: undrafted

Career history
- Chicago Bears (1974); Chicago Winds (1975)
- Stats at Pro Football Reference

David John Gagnon (born January 17, 1951) is an American former professional football player who was a running back for the Chicago Bears of the National Football League (NFL). He played college football for the Ferris State Bulldogs and was also a member of the Chicago Winds in the World Football League (WFL).
