= Bob Matheson =

American football player and coach (1944–1994)

No. 56, 53
- Position: Linebacker

Personal information
- Born: November 25, 1944; Boone, North Carolina, U.S.
- Died: September 5, 1994 (aged 49); Durham, North Carolina, U.S.
- Listed height: 6 ft 4 in (1.93 m)
- Listed weight: 235 lb (107 kg)

Career information
- High school: Appalachian (Boone)
- College: Duke
- NFL draft: 1967: 1st round, 18th overall pick

Career history

Playing
- Cleveland Browns (1967–1970); Miami Dolphins (1971–1979)

Coaching
- Duke (1981–1982) Linebackers coach; Miami Dolphins (1983–1987) Linebackers/special teams coach; Minnesota (1988–1991) Assistant coach

Awards and highlights
- 2× Super Bowl champion (VII, VIII); First-team All-American (1966); 2× First-team All-ACC (1965, 1966)

Career NFL statistics
- Interceptions: 12
- Fumble recoveries: 10
- Sacks: 15
- Stats at Pro Football Reference

Robert Matheson (November 25, 1944 – September 5, 1994) was an American professional football linebacker who played 13 seasons in the National Football League (NFL). He played in three Super Bowls for the Miami Dolphins, including their 1972 and 1973 championships.

A linebacker at Duke University, he was drafted in 1967 by the Cleveland Browns in the first round of the NFL Draft, which was the first year of the common draft between the AFL and NFL. He was then acquired by the Dolphins prior to the 1971 season, after Miami defensive coordinator Bill Arnsparger requested head coach Don Shula to do so. Miami gave up their second round draft pick in 1972 in exchange. Matheson went to Miami one year after the Dolphins acquired Paul Warfield from Cleveland.

Matheson's versatility against both the run and pass was at the heart of the "53" defense, a scheme that was named for his jersey number and devised by Arnsparger. Depending on whether the situation was running or passing, he was a strong-side defensive end and a fourth linebacker respectively. The latter is also referred to as a 3–4 defense, with three linemen and four linebackers.

After leaving the Dolphins in 1979, Matheson returned to Duke as an assistant coach. He later coached special teams and linebackers for five years with the Miami Dolphins. He then joined Duke alumni John Gutekunst as an assistant coach at the University of Minnesota. In 1993, he returned to Duke to work at its Comprehensive Cancer Center.

Matheson died on September 5, 1994, at Duke University Hospital from complications of Hodgkin's disease, which he had had for 13 years.
