= Chuck Kyle (linebacker) =

American football player (born 1947)

Profile
- Position: Linebacker

Personal information
- Born: September 25, 1947 (age 79); Fort Thomas, Kentucky, U.S.
- Listed height: 6 ft 1 in (1.85 m)
- Listed weight: 220 lb (100 kg)

Career information
- High school: Highlands (KY)
- College: Purdue
- NFL draft: 1969: 5th round, 125th overall pick

Career history
- Dallas Cowboys (1969)*; Saskatchewan Roughriders (1969–1970); Montreal Alouettes (1971)*; New York Jets (1972)*
- * Offseason or practice squad member only

Awards and highlights
- Consensus All-American (1968); 2× First-team All-Big Ten (1967, 1968); Second-team All-Big Ten (1966)

Charles Douglas Kyle (born September 25, 1947) is an American former football linebacker in the Canadian Football League (CFL) for the Saskatchewan Roughriders. He played college football at Purdue University.

== Early life ==
Kyle grew up in Fort Thomas, Kentucky. He attended Highlands High School, where he practiced football, shot put and also won a state diving championship.

He accepted a football scholarship from Purdue University. He was a three-year starter at the middle guard position. He was an All-Big Ten player in 1966 (UPI-1), 1967 (AP-1, UPI-1), and 1968 (AP-1, UPI-1). He was also a consensus first-team selection as a middle guard on the 1968 College Football All-America Team.

== Professional career ==
Kyle was selected by the Dallas Cowboys in the fifth round (125th overall) of the 1969 NFL draft. He was waived on September 15.

In 1969, he signed with the Saskatchewan Roughriders of the Canadian Football League. He appeared in 6 games and played in the 57th Grey Cup. In 1971, he played in 12 games and registered 2 interceptions.

On June 9, 1971, he was traded to the Montreal Alouettes in exchange for linebacker Charlie Collins. He was released on July 23.

On February 5, 1972, he was signed as a free agent by the New York Jets. He was waived injured on August 8.
