= Lance Olssen =

American football player (born 1947)

No. 73, 62
- Positions: Offensive tackle, center

Personal information
- Born: April 17, 1947 (age 79); Boston, Massachusetts, U.S.
- Listed height: 6 ft 5 in (1.96 m)
- Listed weight: 262 lb (119 kg)

Career information
- High school: Stuyvesant (New York City, New York)
- College: Purdue
- NFL draft: 1968: 3rd round, 65th overall pick

Career history
- San Francisco 49ers (1968–1969); New Orleans Saints (1970); Edmonton Eskimos (1971–1972)

Awards and highlights
- 2× First-team All-Big Ten (1966, 1967)

Career NFL statistics
- Games played: 9
- Stats at Pro Football Reference

Career CFL statistics
- Games played: 20

Lance Everett Olssen (born April 17, 1947) is an American former professional football player who was an offensive lineman in the National Football League (NFL) and Canadian Football League (CFL). He played college football for the Purdue Boilermakers.

Olssen grew up in Staten Island, New York and played high school football for the Stuyvesant High School Peglegs. He played college football at Purdue University as a defensive tackle, wearing the number 75 jersey. In his collegiate playing years, he was the biggest member of the Boilermakers at 6' 5" and 257 pounds and was a member of the team that won the 1967 Rose Bowl when Purdue narrowly defeated USC 14–13. He was honored that same year as an Academic All-American and graduated with bachelor's and master's degrees in industrial management.

The San Francisco 49ers selected Olssen with the 65th overall pick in the third round of the 1968 NFL/AFL draft. As a professional football player, Olssen switched from being a defensive lineman to an offensive lineman. He played two seasons for the San Francisco 49ers from 1968 to 1969 and one season for the New Orleans Saints in 1970 before playing for the Edmonton Eskimos in the CFL for another two seasons from 1971 to 1972. In the first of his two seasons with the Eskimos, he had one kickoff return for three yards.

After retirement, Olssen worked as a retail store manager and a circulation manager for the Evansville Courier & Press before retiring in 2004 due to health problems. He lives in Newburgh, Indiana with his wife DeeDee, who was a middle school teacher, and has two sons and two grandchildren.
