= Gary Roberts (American football) =

American football player (born 1946)

No. 62
- Position: Offensive guard

Personal information
- Born: November 30, 1946 (age 79); Parkersburg, West Virginia, U.S.
- Listed height: 6 ft 2 in (1.88 m)
- Listed weight: 242 lb (110 kg)

Career information
- High school: Theodore Roosevelt (Kent, Ohio)
- College: Purdue
- NFL draft: 1969: 11th round, 286th overall pick

Career history
- New York Jets (1969)*; Minnesota Vikings (1969–1970)*; Atlanta Falcons (1970); Atlanta Falcons (1971)*
- * Offseason or practice squad member only

Awards and highlights
- Third-team All-American (1968); First-team All-Big Ten (1968)

Career NFL statistics
- Games played: 11
- Stats at Pro Football Reference

Gary Lee Roberts (born November 30, 1946) is an American former professional football player who was an offensive guard for the Atlanta Falcons of the National Football League (NFL) in 1970. He played college football for the Purdue Boilermakers from 1965 to 1967.

== Early life ==
Roberts was born in Parkersburg, West Virginia, in 1946. He attended Theodore Roosevelt High School in Kent, Ohio.

== Purdue ==
Roberts played college football at the University of Purdue, playing for the freshman team in 1965 and the varsity from 1966 to 1969. He was rated as "a find pulling guard and a good pass protector." At the end of the 1968 season, he was selected by the Associated Press and the United Press International as a first-team guard on the 1968 All-Big Ten Conference football team.

== Professional football ==
Roberts was selected by the New York Jets in the 11th round (268th overall pick) of the 1969 NFL/AFL draft. He was signed by the Jets in June 1969. He was cut by the Jets in early September and then signed with the Minnesota Vikings. He was cut by the Vikings in September 1969 on September 15. He was retained on the Vikings taxi squad throughout the 1969 season.

Roberts returned to the Vikings in 1970 but was placed on waivers during training camp. He was claimed by the Atlanta Falcons and began the 1970 season on the Falcons' taxi squad. He was placed on the active roster in late September and appeared in 11 games at offensive guard, six of them as a starter, during the 1970 season.

Roberts returned to the Falcons in 1971, but he was waived by the club in July 1971.
