= Bill Knox (gridiron football) =

American football player (born 1951)

No. 31, 24
- Position: Defensive back

Personal information
- Born: June 19, 1951 (age 75); Elba, Alabama, U.S.
- Listed height: 5 ft 9 in (1.75 m)
- Listed weight: 190 lb (86 kg)

Career information
- High school: Roosevelt (East Chicago, Indiana)
- College: Purdue (1970–1973)
- NFL draft: 1974: undrafted

Career history
- Chicago Bears (1974–1976); Hamilton Tiger-Cats (1978)
- Stats at Pro Football Reference

William Robert Knox (born June 19, 1951) is an American former professional football defensive back who played three seasons with the Chicago Bears of the National Football League (NFL). He played college football at Purdue. He was also a member of the Hamilton Tiger-Cats of the Canadian Football League (CFL).

== Early life and college ==
William Robert Knox was born on June 19, 1951, in Elba, Alabama. He attended East Chicago Roosevelt High School in East Chicago, Indiana.

He was a member of the Purdue Boilermakers of Purdue University from 1970 to 1973. He was a letterman in 1971 and 1972.

== Professional career ==
Knox signed with the Chicago Bears after going undrafted in the 1974 NFL draft. He played in all 14 games for the Bears during his rookie year in 1974, totaling two interceptions, one sack, one fumble recovery, and five punt returns for 35 yards. He appeared in all 14 games again in 1975, recording one fumble recovery, four kick returns for 67 yards, and one punt return for no yards. Knox played in all 14 games for the Bears for the third consecutive season in 1976, totaling two fumble recoveries, one fumble, and one punt return for no yards. He was released by the Bears on September 7, 1977.

Knox played in four games for the Hamilton Tiger-Cats of the Canadian Football League in 1978.
