= Leroy Keyes =

American football player (1947–2021)

No. 20, 23
- Positions: Running back, Safety

Personal information
- Born: February 18, 1947; Newport News, Virginia, U.S.
- Died: April 15, 2021 (aged 74); West Lafayette, Indiana, U.S.
- Listed height: 6 ft 3 in (1.91 m)
- Listed weight: 208 lb (94 kg)

Career information
- High school: George Washington Carver (Newport News)
- College: Purdue (1966–1968)
- NFL draft: 1969: 1st round, 3rd overall pick

Career history
- Philadelphia Eagles (1969–1972); Kansas City Chiefs (1973)

Awards and highlights
- 2× Unanimous All-American (1967, 1968); Chicago Tribune Silver Football (1967); 2× First-team All-Big Ten (1967, 1968); Second-team All-Big Ten (1966)

Career NFL statistics
- Rushing yards: 369
- Rushing average: 3
- Receptions: 30
- Receiving yards: 270
- Total touchdowns: 3
- Interceptions: 8
- Stats at Pro Football Reference
- College Football Hall of Fame

Marvin Leroy Keyes (February 18, 1947 – April 15, 2021) was an American professional football player who was a running back and safety for five seasons in the National Football League (NFL) with the Philadelphia Eagles and the Kansas City Chiefs. He was drafted by the Eagles in the first round of the 1969 NFL/AFL draft. He played college football for the Purdue Boilermakers. He was an All-American as a halfback on offense and played corner on defense and returned kicks and punts. He also played both ways for Philadelphia before settling in as a solid strong safety.

== College career ==
Keyes played college football at Purdue University, where he was an All-American in 1967 and 1968, finished third in the 1967 Heisman Trophy voting, and finished second in the 1968 Heisman Trophy voting. In his very first collegiate game, played on national television against eventual national champion Notre Dame, Keyes made his presence known by returning a fumble 94 yards for a touchdown. He played in the January 1967 Rose Bowl game, which Purdue won 14–13 over USC.

He was a dynamic player running and catching the ball. He finished his career running for 2,090 yards and also had 1,204 receiving yards.

In 1967, he led the nation in scoring as he rushed for 986 yards with 13 touchdowns and had 45 catches for 758 yards and 6 touchdowns. As a senior in 1968, he followed it up by running for 1,003 yards and 14 touchdowns while catching 33 passes for 428 yards and 1 touchdown.

“I may not have won the Heisman, but life goes on,” says Keyes. “You don’t need a trophy to prove how great you were. How you carry yourself, how people react and respond to you is more important than a trophy in your basement. I think my legacy will be that I was a good guy who stood up for my beliefs."

== Professional career ==
=== Philadelphia Eagles ===
Keyes was drafted by the Philadelphia Eagles in the first round with the third overall pick in the 1969 NFL/AFL draft. He played for the Eagles from 1969–1972. He was considered the "consolation prize" by the Eagles, who had just lost out to the Buffalo Bills to draft O. J. Simpson with the first overall pick. Conversely, Keyes was drafted one pick ahead of Joe Greene; both Simpson and Greene would go on to the Pro Football Hall of Fame while Keyes is generally considered a bust.

He started out as a running back and had 637 total yards on offense including 3 rushing touchdowns as a rookie. He saw little playing time in 1970 and was moved to strong safety in 1971, where he made 6 interceptions and recovered 3 fumbles. The next year (1972), he had 2 interceptions in 14 starts before going to Kansas City.

=== Kansas City Chiefs ===
Keyes played for the Kansas City Chiefs in 1973.

== After football ==
Keyes worked for the John Purdue Club until he became an assistant athletic director for the Purdue Boilermakers.

Keyes was a member of The Pigskin Club Of Washington, D.C., as well as the National Intercollegiate All-American Football Players Honor Roll.

In 1987, Keyes was inducted into the Virginia Sports Hall of Fame. He was inducted into the College Football Hall of Fame in 1990. On December 30, 2010, Keyes was inducted into the Rose Bowl Hall of Fame in a ceremony at the Pasadena Convention Center. On December 11, 2014, the Big Ten Network included Keyes on "The Mount Rushmore of Purdue Football", as chosen by online fan voting. Keyes was joined in the honor by Drew Brees, Bob Griese, and Rod Woodson.

Keyes died on April 15, 2021, in West Lafayette, after several months of suffering from a recurrence of cancer and congestive heart failure. Keyes was survived by his wife Monica and children Colin, Raymond, Jacqueline and Courtland.

== See also ==
- List of NCAA major college football yearly scoring leaders
