= 1970 Wichita State Shockers football team =

American college football season

1970 Wichita State Shockers football
- Conference: Missouri Valley Conference
- Record: 0–9 (0–4 MVC)
- Head coach: Ben Wilson † (2nd season; first 3 games); Bob Seaman (1st season, final 6 games)
- Captain: John Hoheisel
- Home stadium: Cessna Stadium

1970 Missouri Valley Conference football standings
	Conf.					Overall
Team	W		L		T	W		L		T
Louisville $	4	–	0	–	0	8	–	3	–	1
Tulsa	3	–	1	–	0	6	–	4	–	0
Memphis State	2	–	2	–	0	6	–	4	–	0
North Texas State	1	–	3	–	0	3	–	8	–	0
Wichita State	0	–	4	–	0	0	–	9	–	0
$ – Conference champion

The 1970 Wichita Shockers football team was a college football team that represented Wichita State University as a member of the Missouri Valley Conference during the 1970 NCAA University Division football season. The team compiled a 0–9 record (0–4 against conference opponents), finished last out of five teams in the MVC, and was outscored 381 to 99. The team played its home games at Cessna Stadium in Wichita, Kansas.

Head coach Ben Wilson, 14 players, and 16 others died on October 2 in a plane crash in the Colorado mountains, en route to Utah State in Logan. Bob Seaman took over as head coach after the crash.

The team's statistical leaders included Rick Baehr with 513 passing yards, Don Gilley with 290 rushing yards and 12 points scored, Bill Moore with 175 receiving yards.

== Schedule ==
Date	Time	Opponent	Site	Result	Attendance	Source
September 12		at Texas A&M*	Kyle Field; College Station, TX	L 14–41	30,006	
September 19	1:30 p.m.	Arkansas State*	Cessna Stadium; Wichita, KS	L 14–53	30,050–30,055	
September 26	8:00 p.m.	at West Texas State*	Buffalo Bowl; Canyon, TX	L 0–43	14,000	
October 3		at Utah State*	Romney Stadium; Logan, UT	Cancelled		
October 10		Southern Illinois*	Cessna Stadium; Wichita, KS	Cancelled		
October 24		at No. 9 Arkansas*	War Memorial Stadium; Little Rock, AR	L 0–62	40,000	
October 31	1:38 p.m.	Cincinnati^{†}*	Cessna Stadium; Wichita, KS	L 5–35	27,210–27,610	
November 7	1:30 p.m.	at Tulsa	Skelly Stadium; Tulsa, OK	L 12–21	25,000	
November 14		at Memphis State	Memphis Memorial Stadium; Memphis, TN	L 6–51	5,181	
November 21	1:30 p.m.	North Texas State	Cessna Stadium; Wichita, KS	L 24–41	13,021	
November 28	1:40 p.m.	Louisville	Cessna Stadium; Wichita, KS	L 24–34	10,356	
*Non-conference game; ^{†}Homecoming; Rankings from AP Poll released prior to the game; All times are in Central time

== Preseason ==
The team included 22 returning lettermen led by junior quarterback Bob Renner, senior fullback Randy Jackson, and middle linebacker John Hoheisel. Hoheisel, who was described by coach Wilson in the preseason as "the heart and soul of our defense", was selected as the team captain. Prior to the start of the season, second-year head coach Ben Wilson described his squad as a young club with good team speed, room to improve, and "a chance to surprise a lot of people."

== September games ==
On September 12, Wichita State opened its season with a 41–14 loss to Gene Stallings' Texas A&M Aggies before a crowd of 30,006 in College Station, Texas. They followed with losses to Arkansas State on September 19 and West Texas State on September 26.

== Plane crash ==
On Friday, October 2, 1970, Wichita State traveled to Logan, Utah, in two chartered planes, designated as "Gold" and "Black" according to the school colors, for a game against Utah State on Saturday. The "Gold" plane, carrying the first-team players, staff, and boosters, crashed in the mountains of Colorado, near and below Loveland Pass. Thirty-one persons were killed in the crash, including the following 14 players:

1. Marvin Brown, sophomore, running back, Solomon, Kansas - age 18
2. Don Christian, junior, defensive back, Duncan, Oklahoma - age 22
3. John Dunren, sophomore, quarterback, Oklahoma City - age 19
4. Ron Johnson, senior, defensive back, Kansas City, Missouri - age 21
5. Randy Kieusau, junior, running back, Clinton, Oklahoma - age 20
6. Mal Kimmel, center, Ste. Genevieve, Missouri - age 21
7. Carl Krueger, sophomore, tackle, Chicago - age 19
8. Steve Moore, senior, linebacker, Derby, Kansas - age 21
9. Tom Owen, junior, running back, Temple Terrace, Florida - age 20
10. Gene Robinson, junior, offensive end, Dayton, Ohio - age 21
11. Tom Shedden, junior, tackle, Oklahoma City - age 20
12. Rick Stines, guard, Kansas City, Kansas - age 19
13. John Taylor, back, Sherman, Texas - died later in the month from injuries sustained in the crash
14. Jack Vetter Jr., senior, lineman, McPherson, Kansas - age 22

The fatalities also included head coach Ben Wilson (and his wife Helen), athletic director Bert Katzenmeyer (and his wife Marian), team manager Marty Harrison (age 19), team trainer Tom Reeves, admissions director Carl Fahrbach, ticket manager Floyd Farmer, Shocker Club chairman Ray Coleman (and his wife Maxine), Kansas state representative Ray King (and his wife Yvonne), the plane's pilot Dan Crocker, and two stewardesses.

In addition to the 14 players killed, eight other players survived the crash with varying degrees of injury:

1. Mike Bruce, tight end/offensive tackle, Sherman, Texas - He later recalled: "When we climbed out of the plane, I could tell I was in about the best condition. I headed down the mountain to get help and a pickup came and took me up to a construction site where we called for help."
2. John Hoheisel, linebacker and team captain, Garden Plain, Kansas - hospitalized in fair condition after the crash
3. Randy Jackson, fullback, Atlanta, Texas - escaped through a hole in the fuselage; hospitalized in serious condition after the crash with deep lacerations on his face and multiple bruises; he returned from his injuries to lead the 1971 team with 820 rushing yards and 48 points scored
4. Glenn Kostal, linebacker, Chicago - dug his way out from under a pile of debris, dirt and tree limbs and crawled through a rip in the fuselage; sustained a broken leg
5. Dave Lewis, lineman, Duncan, Oklahoma - listed in satisfactory condition after the crash
6. Keith Morrison, defensive end, Hawkins, Texas - thrown from the plane as it crashed, he sustained major injuries to his right foot and ankle, a deep gash to his knee, and burn injuries on his right arm and back
7. Bob Renner, junior, quarterback, Garden Plain, Kansas - listed in satisfactory condition after the crash; sustained a leg injury in the crash and was unable resume his role as the team's No. 1 quarterback
8. Rick Stephens, lineman, Andover, Kansas - thrown from the airplane in the crash and knocked unconscious, lost several teeth

On the scheduled game day, the team held a memorial service at Romney Stadium in Logan and placed a wreath on the 50-yard line. Classes at Wichita State were canceled for Monday, October 5, and a memorial service was held that evening at the school's Cessna Stadium.

The following month, Southern Airways Flight 932 carrying the Marshall University football team crashed, killing 37 members of that team. At the end of the season, a nationally televised fundraising program hosted by Monty Hall was aired to raise money for the victims of the two crashes.

== "Second season" ==
After the crash, the team's scheduled games against Utah State and Southern Illinois were cancelled. However, the surviving members of the team voted 76-to-1 to complete the 1970 schedule. The remaining portion of the schedule was designated the "second season." Assistant coach Bob Seaman took over as the team's head coach after the crash.

On October 24, 1970, the team played the first game after the crash. With permission from the NCAA, the Shockers played seven freshmen in their starting lineup. Facing an Arkansas team ranked No. 9 in the country, Wichita lost by a 62–0 score. The Arkansas crowd cheered for the effort demonstrated by Wichita State, and Arkansas coach Frank Broyles benched his first team after seven minutes and used 61 players in the game.

On October 31, the Shockers lost by at 35–5 score to Cincinnati before a homecoming crowd of 27,210. Prior to the game, a 15-minute ceremony featuring astronaut John Swigert was held to commemorate the team's return to Cessna Stadium for its first game since the crash. The Shockers started seven freshmen and 10 sophomores and scored five points on a 37-yard field goal by John Potts and a safety when Cincinnati quarterback Bill Carter was tackled in the end zone.

On November 7, the Shockers showed marked improvement in a 21–12 loss to Tulsa. Trailing 21–6 in the fourth quarter, Wichita's freshman quarterback Tom Owen threw a 21-yard touchdown pass to wingback Tim Thissen to narrow the score to 21–12.

On November 14, Wichita lost to Memphis State by a 51–6 score. The Shockers only points were scored in the first quarter on a 14-yard touchdown pass from Tom Owen to Eddie Plopa.

On November 21, the Shockers lost to North Texas State by a 41–24 score. The highlight of the game for Wichita was a 105-yard kickoff return by tailback Don Gilley in the first quarter. Wichita's freshman quarterback Rick Baher also threw two touchdown passes, and John Potts kicked a 47-yard field goal.

In the final game of the season, the Shockers took a 17–0 lead over Lee Corso's bowl-bound Louisville Cardinals. However, the Cardinals came back to win the game by a 34–24 score.

== Roster ==
The following players from the 1970 team were not on the plane that crashed:

- Rick Baehr, led the team with 513 passing yards
- Warren Barkell
- Jim DeFontes
- Don Gilley, led the team with 290 rushing yards and 12 points scored
- Robin Hardridge
- Wayne Haynes
- John Lee
- Bernie Leece
- Mark McClellan
- Bill Moore, led the team with 12 receptions and 175 receiving yards
- Eddie Plopa
- Chris Sutherland
- Lou Tabor
- Tim Thissen
- John Yeros
