= Bert Katzenmeyer =

American golf coach (1918–1970)

Biographical details
- Born: July 11, 1918; Ellwood City, Pennsylvania, U.S.
- Died: October 2, 1970 (aged 52); Silver Plume, Colorado, U.S.
- Education: Alma College

Playing career
- 1939–1941: Alma

Coaching career (HC unless noted)
- 1946–1947: Ohio State (assistant)
- 1947–1968: Michigan

Administrative career (AD unless noted)
- 1968–1970: Wichita State

Accomplishments and honors

Championships
- 3x Big Ten Conference champion (1947, 1949, 1952)

Albert C. Katzenmeyer (July 11, 1918 – October 2, 1970) was an American coach and administrator who was the men's golf coach at the University of Michigan from 1947 to 1968 and the Wichita State University athletic director from 1968 to 1970. He was one of 31 fatalities in the Wichita State University football team plane crash.

== Golfing ==
Katzenmeyer was born in Ellwood City, Pennsylvania on July 11, 1918 to John and Elizabeth (Swartz) Katzenmeyer. He played golf at Ann Arbor High School and Alma College and captained his college team to an Michigan Intercollegiate Athletic Association championship. After graduating, he spent three years in the United States Air Force and was the assistant golf coach at Ohio State University in 1946. In 1947, Katzenmeyer became the head golf coach at the University of Michigan. He coached the Wolverines to Big Ten Conference championships in 1947, 1949, and 1952. One of his golfers, Dave Barclay, won the 1947 NCAA golf championship. Katzenmeyer was also the coach of Michigan's junior varsity men's basketball team (1947–48) and an administrative assistant to athletic director Fielding H. Yost (1962–68).

== Wichita State University ==
On May 8, 1968, Katzenmeyer was named athletic director at Wichita State University. He took over a program that had recently been placed on probation by the National Collegiate Athletic Association for recruiting violations by football coach Boyd Converse and athletic director Noah G. Allen. During the 1968 football season, Katzenmeyer feuded with head coach Eddie Kriwiel. The Shockers went winless that year and Kriwiel resigned at the end of the season. Katzenmeyer replaced him with Virginia assistant Ben Wilson. On July 28, 1969, the school had its television and bowl game ban lifted by the NCAA "due largely to [Katzenmeyer's] efficient and practical reorganization of university policies and procedures. In 1970, the school dropped its baseball and gymnastic programs due to budgetary issues.

On October 2, 1970, a plane transporting the Wichita State football team to a game at Utah State lost power, crashed, and burned in the Rocky Mountains near Silver Plume, Colorado. Katzenmeyer and his wife were among the 31 persons killed in the crash.
