= Ben Wilson (American football coach) =

American football player and coach (1926–1970)

Biographical details
- Born: January 15, 1926; Cadiz, Ohio, U.S.
- Died: October 2, 1970 (aged 44) near Silver Plume, Colorado, U.S.

Playing career
- 1945–1948: Heidelberg
- Positions: Center, linebacker

Coaching career (HC unless noted)
- 1950: Heidelberg (freshmen)
- 1951–1955: Wellston HS (OH)
- 1955–1957: Mount Vernon HS (OH)
- 1958–1959: Sandusky HS (OH)
- 1960–1964: Warren G. Harding HS (OH)
- 1965–1968: Virginia (OC)
- 1969–1970: Wichita State

Head coaching record
- Overall: 2–11 (college); 95–32–5 (high school)

Ben Wilson (January 15, 1926 – October 2, 1970) was an American football player and coach. He served as the head football coach at Wichita State University from 1969 until three games into the 1970 season, when he was killed in a plane crash.

On October 2, 1970, Wilson and his wife, Helen, were killed along with 14 players on the team and several others during the Wichita State University football team plane crash en route to a game at Utah State University. The remaining team members completed the season under assistant coach Bob Seaman.

== Head coaching record ==
=== College ===
Year	Team	Overall	Conference	Standing	Bowl/playoffs
Wichita State Shockers (Missouri Valley Conference) (1969–1970)
1969	Wichita State	2–8	1–4	T–5th	
1970	Wichita State	0–3	0–0		
Wichita State:		2–11	1–4		
Total:		2–11			
