= 1973 Drake Bulldogs football team =

American college football season

1973 Drake Bulldogs football
- Conference: Missouri Valley Conference
- Record: 2–9 (1–5 MVC)
- Head coach: Jack Wallace (9th season)
- Home stadium: Drake Stadium

1973 Missouri Valley Conference football standings
	Conf.					Overall
Team	W		L		T	W		L		T
Tulsa +	5	–	1	–	0	6	–	5	–	0
North Texas State +	5	–	1	–	0	5	–	5	–	1
Louisville	3	–	2	–	0	5	–	6	–	0
New Mexico State	3	–	2	–	0	5	–	6	–	0
Wichita State	2	–	4	–	0	4	–	7	–	0
Drake	1	–	5	–	0	2	–	9	–	0
West Texas State	1	–	5	–	0	2	–	9	–	0
+ – Conference co-champions

The 1973 Drake Bulldogs football team represented the Drake University as a member of the Missouri Valley Conference (MVC) during the 1973 NCAA Division I football season. Led by Jack Wallace in his ninth season as head coach, the Bulldogs compiled an overall record of 2–9 with a mark of 1–5 in conference play, and finished tied for sixth in the MVC. Drake played home games at Drake Stadium in Des Moines, Iowa.

== Schedule ==
Date	Time	Opponent	Site	Result	Attendance	Source
September 1		New Mexico State	Drake Stadium; Des Moines, IA	L 12–27	8,800	
September 8	7:30 p.m.	at West Texas State	Kimbrough Memorial Stadium; Canyon, TX	L 10–13	19,100	
September 22		Louisville	Drake Stadium; Des Moines, IA	L 17–27	15,700	
September 29		Lamar*	Drake Stadium; Des Moines, IA	W 24–10		
October 6		at Tulsa	Skelly Stadium; Tulsa, OK	L 7–44	23,500	
October 13		Northern Iowa*	Drake Stadium; Des Moines, IA (rivalry)	L 3–31	13,960	
October 20		at North Texas State	Fouts Field; Denton, TX	L 7–19	10,500	
October 27		at Dayton*	Baujan Field; Dayton, OH	L 9–16	7,683	
November 3		at Wichita State	Cessna Stadium; Wichita, KS	W 13–10	11,921	
November 10		at Southern Illinois*	McAndrew Stadium; Carbondale, IL	L 20–37	6,500	
November 17		Temple*	Drake Stadium; Des Moines, IA	L 10–35	6,620	
*Non-conference game; All times are in Central time
