= 1973 Southwestern Louisiana Bulldogs football team =

American college football season

1973 Southwestern Louisiana Bulldogs football
- Conference: Southland Conference
- Record: 0–10 (0–5 Southland)
- Head coach: Russ Faulkinberry (13th season)
- Home stadium: Cajun Field

1973 Southland Conference football standings
	Conf.					Overall
Team	W		L		T	W		L		T
No. 2 Louisiana Tech $^	5	–	0	–	0	12	–	1	–	0
Arkansas State	3	–	2	–	0	7	–	3	–	0
Lamar	3	–	2	–	0	5	–	5	–	0
McNeese State	2	–	3	–	0	7	–	3	–	1
UT Arlington	2	–	3	–	0	4	–	6	–	0
SW Louisiana	0	–	5	–	0	0	–	10	–	0
$ – Conference champion; ^ – NCAA Division II playoff participant; Rankings from AP small college poll

The 1973 Southwestern Louisiana Bulldogs football team was an American football team that represented the University of Southwestern Louisiana (now known as the University of Louisiana at Lafayette) in the Southland Conference during the 1973 NCAA Division II football season. In their thirteenth year under head coach Russ Faulkinberry, the team compiled an 0–10 record.

== Schedule ==
Date	Time	Opponent	Site	Result	Attendance	Source
September 15		at Arkansas State	Kays Stadium; Jonesboro, AR	L 13–27	6,800	
September 22		at No. T–11 Louisiana Tech	Joe Aillet Stadium; Ruston, LA (rivalry)	L 0–23	16,250	
September 29		Chattanooga*	Cajun Field; Lafayette, LA	L 10–21	10,000	
October 6	7:30 p.m.	Xavier*	Cajun Field; Lafayette, LA	L 14–17	8,000	
October 13	7:01 p.m.	at Cincinnati*	Nippert Stadium; Cincinnati, OH	L 0–27	6,341	
October 20		at Lamar	Cardinal Stadium; Beaumont, TX (Sabine Shoe)	L 0–31	9,079	
October 27	7:30 p.m.	UT Arlington	Cajun Field; Lafayette, LA	L 22–31	10,000	
November 10		Northwestern State*	Cajun Field; Lafayette, LA	L 10–20	16,000	
November 17		Memphis State*	Cajun Field; Lafayette, LA	L 6–41	6,600	
November 24		McNeese State	Cajun Field; Lafayette, LA (Cajun Crown)	L 0–37	10,000	
*Non-conference game; Rankings from AP Poll released prior to the game; All times are in Central time
