= 1973 Wichita State Shockers football team =

American college football season

1973 Wichita State Shockers football
- Conference: Missouri Valley Conference
- Record: 4–7 (2–4 MVC)
- Head coach: Bob Seaman (4th season)
- Home stadium: Cessna Stadium

1973 Missouri Valley Conference football standings
| | Conf. | | | | | Overall |
| Team | W | | L | | T | W | | L | | T |
|---|---|---|---|---|---|---|---|---|---|---|
| Tulsa + | 5 | – | 1 | – | 0 | 6 | – | 5 | – | 0 |
| North Texas State + | 5 | – | 1 | – | 0 | 5 | – | 5 | – | 1 |
| Louisville | 3 | – | 2 | – | 0 | 5 | – | 6 | – | 0 |
| New Mexico State | 3 | – | 2 | – | 0 | 5 | – | 6 | – | 0 |
| Wichita State | 2 | – | 4 | – | 0 | 4 | – | 7 | – | 0 |
| Drake | 1 | – | 5 | – | 0 | 2 | – | 9 | – | 0 |
| West Texas State | 1 | – | 5 | – | 0 | 2 | – | 9 | – | 0 |
+ – Conference co-champions

The 1973 Wichita State Shockers football team was an American football team that represented Wichita State University as a member of the Missouri Valley Conference (MVC) during the 1973 NCAA Division I football season. In their fourth year under head coach Bob Seaman, the team compiled an overall record of 4–7 with a mark of 2–4 in conference play, finishing in fifth place in the MVC.

== Schedule ==
| Date | Time | Opponent | Site | Result | Attendance | Source |
|---|---|---|---|---|---|---|
| September 15 | | at Texas A&M* | Kyle Field; College Station, TX | L 0–48 | 31,474 | |
| September 22 | 7:30 p.m. | Arkansas State* | Cessna Stadium; Wichita, KS | W 14–12 | 13,151 | |
| September 29 | | at New Mexico State | Memorial Stadium; Las Cruces, NM | L 18–44 | 10,775 | |
| October 6 | 7:02 p.m. | at Louisville | Fairgrounds Stadium; Louisville, KY | L 10–24 | 28,631 | |
| October 13 | 7:30 p.m. | Fresno State* | Cessna Stadium; Wichita, KS | W 18–13 | 11,931–11,951 | |
| October 20 | 12:31 p.m. | at Cincinnati* | Nippert Stadium; Cincinnati, OH | L 6–27 | 8,680 | |
| October 27 | 1:30 p.m. | West Texas State | Cessna Stadium; Wichita, KS | W 30–14 | 9,326 | |
| November 3 | 1:30 p.m. | Drake^{†} | Cessna Stadium; Wichita, KS | L 10–13 | 11,921 | |
| November 10 | 2:05 p.m. | at North Texas State | Fouts Field; Denton, TX | L 21–31 | 16,200 | |
| November 17 | 1:30 p.m. | Long Beach State* | Cessna Stadium; Wichita, KS | L 10–35 | 7,863 | |
| November 24 | 1:30 p.m. | Tulsa | Cessna Stadium; Wichita, KS | W 28–19 | 6,548 | |
*Non-conference game; ^{†}Homecoming; All times are in Central time
