= Randy Jackson (running back) =

American football player (1948–2010)

No. 33
- Position: Running back

Personal information
- Born: November 13, 1948; Atlanta, Texas, U.S.
- Died: July 21, 2010 (aged 61); Wichita, Kansas, U.S.
- Listed height: 6 ft 0 in (1.83 m)
- Listed weight: 220 lb (100 kg)

Career information
- High school: Atlanta
- College: Wichita State
- NFL draft: 1972: 4th round, 79th overall pick

Career history
- Buffalo Bills (1972); San Francisco 49ers (1973); Philadelphia Eagles (1974)

Career NFL statistics
- Rushing attempts-yards: 30–70
- Receptions-yards: 5–58
- Touchdowns: 1
- Stats at Pro Football Reference

Randy Joe Jackson (November 13, 1948 – July 21, 2010) was an American professional football running back in the National Football League (NFL). He played for the Buffalo Bills, San Francisco 49ers, and Philadelphia Eagles, having played college football at Wichita State University. After retiring, he taught physical education and coached basketball at Robinson Middle School (Wichita, Kansas) for more than 30 years.

Randy Jackson was one of nine survivors of the Wichita State University football team plane crash.

He died on July 21, 2010, at the age of 61 from pancreatic cancer.
