= 1973 Arkansas State Indians football team =

American college football season

1973 Arkansas State Indians football
- Conference: Southland Conference
- Record: 7–3 (3–2 Southland)
- Head coach: Bill Davidson (3rd season)
- Home stadium: Kays Stadium; War Memorial Stadium

1973 Southland Conference football standings
	Conf.					Overall
Team	W		L		T	W		L		T
No. 2 Louisiana Tech $^	5	–	0	–	0	12	–	1	–	0
Arkansas State	3	–	2	–	0	7	–	3	–	0
Lamar	3	–	2	–	0	5	–	5	–	0
McNeese State	2	–	3	–	0	7	–	3	–	1
UT Arlington	2	–	3	–	0	4	–	6	–	0
SW Louisiana	0	–	5	–	0	0	–	10	–	0
$ – Conference champion; ^ – NCAA Division II playoff participant; Rankings from AP small college poll

The 1973 Arkansas State Indians football team represented Arkansas State University as a member of the Southland Conference during the 1973 NCAA Division II football season. Led by third-year head coach Bill Davidson, the Indians compiled an overall record of 7–3 with a mark of 3–2 in conference play, tying for second place in the Southland.

== Schedule ==
Date	Time	Opponent	Site	Result	Attendance	Source
September 8		Abilene Christian*	Kays Stadium; Jonesboro, AR	W 56–46	6,998	
September 15		Southwestern Louisiana	Kays Stadium; Jonesboro, AR	W 27–13	6,800	
September 22	7:30 p.m.	at Wichita State*	Cessna Stadium; Wichita, KS	L 12–14	13,151	
September 29		Indiana State*	Kays Stadium; Jonesboro, AR	W 9–3	7,263	
October 13		at No. 7 Louisiana Tech	Joe Aillet Stadium; Ruston, LA	L 7–23	13,800	
October 20	7:30 p.m.	Xavier*	War Memorial Stadium; Little Rock, AR	W 37–0	12,000	
October 27		at Lamar	Cardinal Stadium; Beaumont, TX	L 7–10	9,900	
November 3		Illinois State*^{†}	Kays Stadium; Jonesboro, AR	W 38–20	8,700	
November 10	1:30 p.m.	UT Arlington	Kays Stadium; Jonesboro, AR	W 30–14	7,500–10,000	
November 17		at McNeese State	Cowboy Stadium; Lake Charles, LA	W 26–23	11,000	
*Non-conference game; ^{†}Homecoming; Rankings from AP Poll released prior to the game; All times are in Central time
