= Bob Seaman =

American football coach (1932–2018)

Biographical details
- Born: March 28, 1932; Sandusky, Ohio, U.S.
- Died: August 13, 2018 (aged 86); Eaton, Ohio, U.S.

Coaching career (HC unless noted)
- 1957–1963: Sandusky HS (OH) (assistant)
- 1964–1965: Sandusky HS (OH)
- 1966–1968: Massillon Washington HS (OH)
- 1969–1970: Wichita State (assistant)
- 1970–1973: Wichita State
- 1974: Iowa State (DC)
- 1979–1982: Emporia State

Head coaching record
- Overall: 23–56 (college); 39–10–1 (high school)

Accomplishments and honors

Awards
- Ohio High School Football Coaches Association Hall of Fame

Joseph Robert Seaman (March 28, 1932 – August 13, 2018) was an American football coach. He served as the head football coach at Wichita State University from 1971 to 1973 and at Emporia State University from 1979 to 1982, compiling a career college football record of 23–56.

== Early life and education ==
Seamon was born and raised in Sandusky, Ohio. He graduated from Sandusky High School and attended Kent State University on a scholarship. An injury sustained during a spring game in his freshman year at Kent State ended his football career. He had been slated to start at center for the Kent State varsity football team that fall. Despite the injury, Seamon continued as a member of Kent State's track and field team, winning a Mid-American Conference title in the high jump.

== Coaching career ==
=== Wichita State ===
Seaman was the assistant football coach on October 2, 1970—the day of the Wichita State University football team plane crash. Wichita State was using two planes to transport its team to Utah State University for a football game when one of the planes (named "Gold") crashed. Coach Seaman told the football players and coaches on the "Black" plane shortly after arrival in Logan, Utah.

"There was belief and disbelief amongst the players and amongst the coaches," Bob Seaman, WSU assistant coach, said. "We know what had happened, but we didn't want to believe what had happened."

Although they did not play the game at Utah, the surviving players voted to continue the season.

In 1972, Seaman guided Wichita State to its first winning season in nine years, a 6–5 record. Wichita State had only one more winning season before the program was dropped in 1986.

=== Emporia State ===
Seaman later became the 19th head football coach for Emporia State University in Emporia, Kansas and he held that position for four seasons, from 1979 until 1982. His overall coaching record at Emporia State was 10–30.

== Death ==
Seaman died on August 13, 2018, in Eaton, Ohio. Seaman was inducted into both Sandusky High School and the Ohio High School Football Coaches Association hall of fame.

== Head coaching record ==
=== College ===
Year	Team	Overall	Conference	Standing	Bowl/playoffs
Wichita State Shockers (Missouri Valley Conference) (1970–1973)
1970	Wichita State	0–6	0–4	5th	
1971	Wichita State	3–8	0–5	7th	
1972	Wichita State	6–5	2–4	6th	
1973	Wichita State	4–7	2–4	5th	
Wichita State:		13–26	4–17		
Emporia State Hornets (Central States Intercollegiate Conference) (1979–1982)
1979	Emporia State	4–6	2–5	T–7th	
1980	Emporia State	2–8	1–6	T–7th	
1981	Emporia State	1–9	0–7	8th	
1982	Emporia State	3–7	1–6	T–6th	
Emporia State:		10–30	4–24		
Total:		23–56			
