= 1973 UT Arlington Mavericks football team =

American college football season

1973 UT Arlington Mavericks football
- Conference: Southland Conference
- Record: 4–6 (2–3 Southland)
- Head coach: John Symank (3rd season)
- Defensive coordinator: C. O. Brocato (3rd season)
- Home stadium: Arlington Stadium

1973 Southland Conference football standings
	Conf.					Overall
Team	W		L		T	W		L		T
No. 2 Louisiana Tech $^	5	–	0	–	0	12	–	1	–	0
Arkansas State	3	–	2	–	0	7	–	3	–	0
Lamar	3	–	2	–	0	5	–	5	–	0
McNeese State	2	–	3	–	0	7	–	3	–	1
UT Arlington	2	–	3	–	0	4	–	6	–	0
SW Louisiana	0	–	5	–	0	0	–	10	–	0
$ – Conference champion; ^ – NCAA Division II playoff participant; Rankings from AP small college poll

The 1973 UT Arlington Mavericks football team was an American football team that represented the University of Texas at Arlington in the Southland Conference during the 1973 NCAA Division I football season. In their third year under head coach John Symank, the team compiled a 4–6 record.

== Schedule ==
Date	Time	Opponent	Site	Result	Attendance	Source
September 8	7:30 p.m.	vs. North Texas State*	Texas Stadium; Irving, TX	W 31–7	19,131	
September 15		at Oklahoma State*	Lewis Field; Stillwater, OK	L 7–56	35,500	
September 22	7:30 p.m.	at TCU*	Amon G. Carter Stadium; Fort Worth, TX	L 13–49	18,930	
October 6	7:30 p.m.	McNeese State	Arlington Stadium; Arlington, TX	W 26–24	5,200–5,500	
October 20	7:30 p.m.	Southern Miss*	Arlington Stadium; Arlington, TX	L 14–41	4,000	
October 27	7:30 p.m.	at Southwestern Louisiana	Cajun Field; Lafayette, LA	W 31–22	10,000	
November 3	2:00 p.m.	at No. 6 Louisiana Tech	Joe Aillet Stadium; Ruston, LA	L 0–44	16,200	
November 10	1:30 p.m.	at Arkansas State	Kays Stadium; Jonesboro, AR	L 14–30	7,500–10,000	
November 17	2:00 p.m.	Western Michigan*	Arlington Stadium; Arlington, TX	W 31–12	3,200	
November 24	3:00 p.m.	Lamar	Arlington Stadium; Arlington, TX	L 3–10	3,000	
*Non-conference game; Rankings from AP Poll released prior to the game; All times are in Central time
