= 1973 New Mexico State Aggies football team =

American college football season

1973 New Mexico State Aggies football
- Conference: Missouri Valley Conference
- Record: 5–6 (3–2 MVC)
- Head coach: Jim Bradley (1st season)
- Home stadium: Memorial Stadium

1973 Missouri Valley Conference football standings
	Conf.					Overall
Team	W		L		T	W		L		T
Tulsa +	5	–	1	–	0	6	–	5	–	0
North Texas State +	5	–	1	–	0	5	–	5	–	1
Louisville	3	–	2	–	0	5	–	6	–	0
New Mexico State	3	–	2	–	0	5	–	6	–	0
Wichita State	2	–	4	–	0	4	–	7	–	0
Drake	1	–	5	–	0	2	–	9	–	0
West Texas State	1	–	5	–	0	2	–	9	–	0
+ – Conference co-champions

The 1973 New Mexico State Aggies football team was an American football team that represented New Mexico State University in the Missouri Valley Conference during the 1973 NCAA Division I football season. In their first year under head coach Jim Bradley, the Aggies compiled a 5–6 record. The team played home games at Memorial Stadium in Las Cruces, New Mexico.

== Schedule ==
Date	Time	Opponent	Site	Result	Attendance	Source
September 1		at Drake	Drake Stadium; Des Moines, IA	W 27–12	8,800	
September 8		Lamar*	Memorial Stadium; Las Cruces, NM	W 24–7	15,992	
September 15		at New Mexico*	University Stadium; Albuquerque, NM (rivalry)	L 6–48	24,145	
September 22		at Colorado State*	Hughes Stadium; Fort Collins, CO	L 27–31	25,124	
September 29		Wichita State	Memorial Stadium; Las Cruces, NM	W 44–18	10,775	
October 6		at UTEP*	Sun Bowl; El Paso, TX (rivalry)	W 27–23	9,745	
October 13		at San Diego State*	San Diego Stadium; San Diego, CA	L 0–27	36,552	
October 20		at Tulsa	Skelly Stadium; Tulsa, OK	L 14–52	20,000	
October 27		North Texas State	Memorial Stadium; Las Cruces, NM	L 7–27	11,150	
November 3	7:31 p.m.	West Texas State	Memorial Stadium; Las Cruces, NM	W 56–14	6,723	
November 10		Utah State*	Memorial Stadium; Las Cruces, NM	L 12–40	8,433	
*Non-conference game; All times are in Mountain time
