= 1973 Louisiana Tech Bulldogs football team =

American college football season

1973 Louisiana Tech Bulldogs football

NCAA Division II champion Southland champion Pioneer Bowl champion Camellia Bowl champion

Camellia Bowl, W 34–0 vs. Western Kentucky
- Conference: Southland Conference

Ranking
- AP: No. 2
- Record: 12–1 (5–0 Southland)
- Head coach: Maxie Lambright (7th season)
- Captains: Denny Duron; Joe McNeely
- Home stadium: Joe Aillet Stadium

1973 Southland Conference football standings
	Conf.					Overall
Team	W		L		T	W		L		T
No. 2 Louisiana Tech $^	5	–	0	–	0	12	–	1	–	0
Arkansas State	3	–	2	–	0	7	–	3	–	0
Lamar	3	–	2	–	0	5	–	5	–	0
McNeese State	2	–	3	–	0	7	–	3	–	1
UT Arlington	2	–	3	–	0	4	–	6	–	0
SW Louisiana	0	–	5	–	0	0	–	10	–	0
$ – Conference champion; ^ – NCAA Division II playoff participant; Rankings from AP small college poll

The 1973 Louisiana Tech Bulldogs football team represented Louisiana Tech University during the 1973 NCAA Division II football season, and completed the 71st season of Bulldogs football and their first as members of the reorganized NCAA Division II. The Bulldogs played their home games in at Joe Aillet Stadium in Ruston, Louisiana. The 1973 team came off an undefeated 12–0 record, and a College Division National Championship from the prior season. The 1973 team was led by coach Maxie Lambright. The team finished the regular season with a 9–1 record and made the inaugural NCAA Division II playoffs. They made the first NCAA Division II Football Championship Game with a 38–34 win over Boise State in the Pioneer Bowl. The Bulldogs defeated the Western Kentucky Hilltoppers 34–0 in the Camellia Bowl National Championship Game.

The Bulldog defense, led by future Pro Football Hall of Fame defensive end Fred Dean, posted three shutouts and allowed seven or fewer points in 10 of 13 games.

== Schedule ==
Date	Time	Opponent	Rank	Site	Result	Attendance	Source
September 15		at Eastern Michigan*		Rynearson Stadium; Ypsilanti, MI	L 19–21	9,300	
September 22		Southwestern Louisiana	No. T–11	Joe Aillet Stadium; Ruston, LA (rivalry)	W 23–0	16,200	
September 29		at McNeese State	No. 9	Cowboy Stadium; Lake Charles, LA	W 10–7	15,000	
October 6		Northern Arizona*	No. 9	Joe Aillet Stadium; Ruston, LA	W 37–7	15,600	
October 13		Arkansas State	No. 7	Joe Aillet Stadium; Ruston, LA	W 23–7	13,800	
October 20		vs. Northwestern State*	No. 8	State Fair Stadium; Shreveport, LA (rivalry)	W 26–7	33,000	
October 27		at Southeastern Louisiana*	No. 8	Strawberry Stadium; Hammond, LA	W 26–7	8,500	
November 3	2:00 p.m.	UT Arlington	No. 6	Joe Aillet Stadium; Ruston, LA	W 44–0	16,200	
November 10		at Lamar	No. 5	Cardinal Stadium; Beaumont, TX	W 17–3	10,200	
November 17		Northeast Louisiana	No. 5	Joe Aillet Stadium; Ruston, LA (rivalry)	W 40–0	16,840–16,850	
December 1		Western Illinois*	No. 3	Joe Aillet Stadium; Ruston, LA (NCAA Division II Quarterfinal)	W 18–13	15,200	
December 8		vs. No. 7 Boise State*	No. 3	Memorial Stadium; Wichita Falls, TX (Pioneer Bowl—NCAA Division II Semifinal)	W 38–34	13,000	
December 15		vs. No. 2 Western Kentucky*	No. 3	Charles C. Hughes Stadium; Sacramento, CA (Camellia Bowl—NCAA Division II Championship Game)	W 34–0	12,016	
*Non-conference game; Rankings from AP Poll released prior to the game; All times are in Central time
