= 1970 North Texas State Mean Green football team =

American college football season

1970 North Texas State Mean Green football
- Conference: Missouri Valley Conference
- Record: 3–8 (1–3 MVC)
- Head coach: Rod Rust (4th season)
- Home stadium: Fouts Field

1970 Missouri Valley Conference football standings
	Conf.					Overall
Team	W		L		T	W		L		T
Louisville $	4	–	0	–	0	8	–	3	–	1
Tulsa	3	–	1	–	0	6	–	4	–	0
Memphis State	2	–	2	–	0	6	–	4	–	0
North Texas State	1	–	3	–	0	3	–	8	–	0
Wichita State	0	–	4	–	0	0	–	9	–	0
$ – Conference champion

The 1970 North Texas State Mean Green football team was an American football team that represented North Texas State University (now known as the University of North Texas) during the 1970 NCAA University Division football season as a member of the Missouri Valley Conference. In their fourth year under head coach Rod Rust, the team compiled a 3–8 record.

== Schedule ==
Date	Time	Opponent	Site	Result	Attendance	Source
September 12		at BYU*	Cougar Stadium; Provo, UT	L 7–10	23,496	
September 19	7:30 p.m.	San Diego State*	Fouts Field; Denton, TX	L 0–23	14,300	
September 26	6:02 p.m.	at Louisville	Fairgrounds Stadium; Louisville, KY	L 2–13	9,919	
October 3		Drake	Fouts Field; Denton, TX	W 37–13	8,500	
October 10	7:00 p.m.	at No. 8 Tampa*	Tampa Stadium; Tampa, FL	L 7–18	15,200	
October 17	8:00 p.m.	at West Texas State*	Buffalo Bowl; Canyon, TX	W 11–10	14,000	
October 24	7:30 p.m.	Memphis State	Fouts Field; Denton, TX	L 7–28	10,000	
October 31	7:30 p.m.	New Mexico State*	Fouts Field; Denton, TX	L 31–32	9,500	
November 7	2:00 p.m.	Cincinnati*^{†}	Fouts Field; Denton, TX	L 10–30	15,500	
November 21	1:30 p.m.	at Wichita State	Cessna Stadium; Wichita, KS	W 41–24	13,021	
December 5	8:40 p.m.	at Tulsa	Skelly Stadium; Tulsa, OK	L 20–26	10,000	
*Non-conference game; ^{†}Homecoming; Rankings from AP Poll released prior to the game; All times are in Central time

== Roster ==
1970 North Texas Mean Green football team roster
Players
Coaches
Offense

Pos.	#	Name	Class
QB	11	Tommy Nelson	So
QB	14	Danny Collins	Jr
WR	36	John Edwards	Jr
C	57	Willie Parker	Sr
G	62	Bob Tricks	Sr
OT	64	Steve McCoy	Sr
OT	73	Dan Hill	So

Defense

Pos.	#	Name	Class
DB	25	Len Dunlap	Sr
DB	26	Perry Pruett	Sr
DB	35	Dan Rice	So
LB	55	Richard Gill	Sr
LB	61	Aaron Bonds	Jr
DT	66	John Pyszynski	Jr
DT	68	Lennie Givens	Sr
DT	70	Jimmy Franklin	Sr
DT	79	Thomas Gipson	Sr

Special teams

Pos.	#	Name	Class

Head coach

- Rod Rust

Coordinators/assistant coaches

Legend

- (C) Team captain
- (S) Suspended
- (I) Ineligible
- Injured
- Redshirt
