= 1970 Tulsa Golden Hurricane football team =

American college football season

1970 Tulsa Golden Hurricane football
- Conference: Missouri Valley Conference
- Record: 6–4 (3–1 MVC)
- Head coach: Claude "Hoot" Gibson (1st season)
- Home stadium: Skelly Stadium

1970 Missouri Valley Conference football standings
	Conf.					Overall
Team	W		L		T	W		L		T
Louisville $	4	–	0	–	0	8	–	3	–	1
Tulsa	3	–	1	–	0	6	–	4	–	0
Memphis State	2	–	2	–	0	6	–	4	–	0
North Texas State	1	–	3	–	0	3	–	8	–	0
Wichita State	0	–	4	–	0	0	–	9	–	0
$ – Conference champion

The 1970 Tulsa Golden Hurricane football team represented the University of Tulsa during the 1970 NCAA University Division football season. In their first year under head coach Claude "Hoot" Gibson, the Golden Hurricane compiled a 6–4 record, 3–1 against conference opponents, and finished in second place in the Missouri Valley Conference.

The team's statistical leaders included John Dobbs with 664 passing yards, Josh Ashton with 685 rushing yards, and Jim Butler with 245 receiving yards.

== Schedule ==
Date	Time	Opponent	Site	Result	Attendance	Source
September 12	1:30 p.m.	Cincinnati*	Skelly Stadium; Tulsa, OK	W 7–3	17,500	
September 19		Idaho State*	Skelly Stadium; Tulsa, OK	W 38–13	15,250	
September 26		at No. 12 Arkansas*	Razorback Stadium; Fayetteville, AR	L 7–49	40,000	
October 3	1:30 p.m.	Memphis State	Skelly Stadium; Tulsa, OK	W 27–12	17,500	
October 10	6:01 p.m.	at Louisville	Fairgrounds Stadium; Louisville, KY	L 8–14	9,453	
October 17		at Virginia Tech*	Lane Stadium; Blacksburg, VA	L 14–17	24,000	
October 31		at Houston*	Houston Astrodome; Houston, TX	L 9–21	34,119	
November 7	1:30 p.m.	Wichita State^{†}	Skelly Stadium; Tulsa, OK	W 21–12	25,000	
November 21		Idaho*	Skelly Stadium; Tulsa, OK	W 30–17	8,500	
December 5	8:40 p.m.	North Texas State	Skelly Stadium; Tulsa, OK	W 26–20	10,000	
*Non-conference game; ^{†}Homecoming; Rankings from AP Poll released prior to the game; All times are in Central time

== Roster ==
1970 Tulsa Golden Hurricane football team roster
Players
Coaches
Offense

Pos.	#	Name	Class
RB	26	Josh Ashton	Sr
OT	74	Jean Barrett	Jr
QB	5	Ray Borowicz	Sr
WR	11	Ken Duncan	Sr
G	69	Joe Garnero	Sr

Defense

Pos.	#	Name	Class
LB	90	Dick Blanchard	Jr
DT	75	Tom Brady	Jr
DT	93	Jim King	Jr
DB		Ralph McGill	Sr
DB	16	Jim Morgan	Sr

Special teams

Pos.	#	Name	Class
K	3	Larry Cookus	Sr

Head coach

- Claude "Hoot" Gibson

Coordinators/assistant coaches

Legend

- (C) Team captain
- (S) Suspended
- (I) Ineligible
- Injured
- Redshirt

== After the season ==
=== 1971 NFL draft ===
The following Golden Hurricane players were selected in the 1971 NFL draft following the season.

Round	Pick	Player	Position	NFL club
9	209	Josh Ashton	Running back	New England Patriots
17	439	Ken Duncan	Punter	Minnesota Vikings
