= 1973 West Texas State Buffaloes football team =

American college football season

1973 West Texas State Buffaloes football
- Conference: Missouri Valley Conference
- Record: 2–9 (1–5 MVC)
- Head coach: Gene Mayfield (3rd season)
- Home stadium: Kimbrough Memorial Stadium

1973 Missouri Valley Conference football standings
	Conf.					Overall
Team	W		L		T	W		L		T
Tulsa +	5	–	1	–	0	6	–	5	–	0
North Texas State +	5	–	1	–	0	5	–	5	–	1
Louisville	3	–	2	–	0	5	–	6	–	0
New Mexico State	3	–	2	–	0	5	–	6	–	0
Wichita State	2	–	4	–	0	4	–	7	–	0
Drake	1	–	5	–	0	2	–	9	–	0
West Texas State	1	–	5	–	0	2	–	9	–	0
+ – Conference co-champions

The 1973 West Texas State Buffaloes football team was an American football team that represented West Texas State University (now known as West Texas A&M University) as a member of the Missouri Valley Conference (MVC) during the 1973 NCAA Division I football season. In their third year under head coach Gene Mayfield, the Buffaloes compiled an overall record of 2–9 with a mark of 1–5 in conference play, and finished tied for sixth in the MVC, and were outscored by opponents by a total of 115 to 310. West Texas played home games at Kimbrough Memorial Stadium in Canyon, Texas.

== Schedule ==
Date	Time	Opponent	Site	Result	Attendance	Source
September 8	7:30 p.m.	Drake	Kimbrough Memorial Stadium; Canyon, TX	W 13–10	19,100	
September 15	7:30 p.m.	at Tulsa	Skelly Stadium; Tulsa, OK	L 3–48	27,000	
September 22	7:30 p.m.	at North Texas State	Fouts Field; Denton, TX	L 15–32	11,432	
September 29	7:30 p.m.	Northern Illinois*	Kimbrough Memorial Stadium; Canyon, TX	L 14–21	13,300–13,800	
October 6		at Lamar*	Cardinal Stadium; Beaumont, TX	W 13–0	9,796	
October 20	7:30 p.m.	Utah State*	Kimbrough Memorial Stadium; Canyon, TX	L 14–36	13,800	
October 27	1:30 p.m.	at Wichita State	Cessna Stadium; Wichita, KS	L 14–30	9,326	
November 3	8:31 p.m.	at New Mexico State	Memorial Stadium; Las Cruces, NM	L 14–56	6,723	
November 10	7:30 p.m.	Tampa*	Kimbrough Memorial Stadium; Canyon, TX	L 6–28	6,650	
November 17	7:32 p.m.	Southern Miss*	Kimbrough Memorial Stadium; Canyon, TX	L 0–28	5,800	
November 24	1:30 p.m.	Louisville	Kimbrough Memorial Stadium; Canyon, TX	L 9–21	4,200	
*Non-conference game; All times are in Central time
