= 1970 Memphis State Tigers football team =

American college football season

1970 Memphis State Tigers football
- Conference: Missouri Valley Conference
- Record: 6–4 (2–2 MVC)
- Head coach: Billy J. Murphy (13th season)
- Home stadium: Memphis Memorial Stadium

1970 Missouri Valley Conference football standings
	Conf.					Overall
Team	W		L		T	W		L		T
Louisville $	4	–	0	–	0	8	–	3	–	1
Tulsa	3	–	1	–	0	6	–	4	–	0
Memphis State	2	–	2	–	0	6	–	4	–	0
North Texas State	1	–	3	–	0	3	–	8	–	0
Wichita State	0	–	4	–	0	0	–	9	–	0
$ – Conference champion

The 1970 Memphis State Tigers football team represented Memphis State University (now known as the University of Memphis) as a member of the Missouri Valley Conference (MVC) during the 1970 NCAA University Division football season. In its 13th season under head coach Billy J. Murphy, the team compiled a 6–4 record (2–2 against conference opponents), finished in third place out of five teams in the MVC, and outscored opponents by a total of 227 to 184. The team played its home games at Memphis Memorial Stadium in Memphis, Tennessee.

The team's statistical leaders included Rick Strawbridge with 557 passing yards, Paul Gowen with 868 rushing yards, Bill Wright with 206 receiving yards, and Jay McCoy with 54 points scored.

== Schedule ==
Date	Time	Opponent	Site	Result	Attendance	Source
September 19	7:30 p.m.	No. 5 Ole Miss*	Memphis Memorial Stadium; Memphis, TN (rivalry)	L 13–47	50,164	
September 26	12:30 p.m.	at Virginia Tech*	Lane Stadium; Blacksburg, VA	W 21–20	18,000	
October 3	1:30 p.m.	at Tulsa	Skelly Stadium; Tulsa, OK	L 12–27	17,500	
October 17		Florida State*	Memphis Memorial Stadium; Memphis, TN	W 16–12	29,047	
October 24	7:30 p.m.	at North Texas State*	Fouts Field; Denton, TX	W 28–8	10,000	
October 31		Southern Miss*	Memphis Memorial Stadium; Memphis, TN (Black and Blue Bowl)	W 33–0	24,468	
November 7	6:00 p.m.	at Louisville	Fairgrounds Stadium; Louisville, KY (rivalry)	L 27–40	22,657	
November 14		Wichita State	Memphis Memorial Stadium; Memphis, TN	W 51–6	5,181	
November 21		Utah State*	Memphis Memorial Stadium; Memphis, TN	L 12–15	13,136	
November 28		Cincinnati*	Memphis Memorial Stadium; Memphis, TN (rivalry)	W 14–10	8,734	
*Non-conference game; Rankings from AP Poll released prior to the game; All times are in Central time
