= 1970 Louisville Cardinals football team =

American college football season

1970 Louisville Cardinals football

MVC champion

Pasadena Bowl, T 24–24 vs. Long Beach State
- Conference: Missouri Valley Conference
- Record: 8–3–1 (4–0 MVC)
- Head coach: Lee Corso (2nd season)
- Home stadium: Fairgrounds Stadium

1970 Missouri Valley Conference football standings
	Conf.					Overall
Team	W		L		T	W		L		T
Louisville $	4	–	0	–	0	8	–	3	–	1
Tulsa	3	–	1	–	0	6	–	4	–	0
Memphis State	2	–	2	–	0	6	–	4	–	0
North Texas State	1	–	3	–	0	3	–	8	–	0
Wichita State	0	–	4	–	0	0	–	9	–	0
$ – Conference champion

The 1970 Louisville Cardinals football team was an American football team that represented the University of Louisville in the Missouri Valley Conference (MVC) during the 1970 NCAA University Division football season. Under second-year head coach Lee Corso, the Cardinals compiled an 8–3–1 record (4–0 in MVC), played Long Beach State to a tie in the Pasadena Bowl, and outscored their opponents 252 to 208.

The team's statistical leaders included John Madeya with 1,602 passing yards, Bill Gatti with 941 rushing yards, Cookie Brinkman with 599 receiving yards, and Larry Hart with 48 points scored. Punter and kicker Scott Marcus was featured in an article in Sports Illustrated.

== Schedule ==
Date	Time	Opponent	Site	Result	Attendance	Source
September 12	7:31 p.m.	at Florida State*	Doak Campbell Stadium; Tallahassee, FL	L 7–9	27,389	
September 19	8:30 p.m.	at Southern Illinois*	McAndrew Stadium; Carbondale, IL	L 28–31	7,000	
September 26	7:02 p.m.	North Texas State	Fairgrounds Stadium; Louisville, KY	W 13–2	9,919	
October 3		at Dayton*	Baujan Field; Dayton, OH	L 11–28	10,004	
October 10	7:01 p.m.	Tulsa	Fairgrounds Stadium; Louisville, KY	W 14–8	9,453	
October 17		at Marshall*	Fairfield Stadium; Huntington, WV	W 16–14	6,500	
October 31	7:02 p.m.	Kent State*	Fairgrounds Stadium; Louisville, KY	W 14–13	7,222	
November 7	7:02 p.m.	Memphis State	Fairgrounds Stadium; Louisville, KY (rivalry)	W 40–27	22,657	
November 14	1:30 p.m.	at Cincinnati*	Nippert Stadium; Cincinnati, OH (The Keg of Nails)	W 28–14	4,000	
November 21	10:02 a.m.	Drake*	Fairgrounds Stadium; Louisville, KY	W 23–14	12,065	
November 28	2:40 p.m.	at Wichita State	Cessna Stadium; Wichita, KS	W 34–24	10,356	
December 19		vs. Long Beach State*	Rose Bowl; Pasadena, CA (Pasadena Bowl)	T 24–24	20,472	
*Non-conference game; All times are in Eastern time

== Roster ==
1970 Louisville Cardinals football team roster
Players
Coaches
Offense

Pos.	#	Name	Class
TE	48	Larry Ball	Jr
TE		Cookie Brinkman (C)	Sr
FB	44	Bill Gatti	Sr
B	20	Larry Hart	Sr
QB	9	John Madeya	So

Defense

Pos.	#	Name	Class
LB	50	Tom Jackson	So
DT	74	Horace Jones	Sr
LB	65	Amos Martin	Jr
DE	56	Tom Mihm	Jr

Special teams

Pos.	#	Name	Class
P		Cookie Brinkman (C)	Sr
P, K	67	Scott Marcus

Head coach

- Lee Corso (2nd year)

Coordinators/assistant coaches

- Joe Perella – Running backs/tight ends

Legend

- (C) Team captain
- (S) Suspended
- (I) Ineligible
- Injured
- Redshirt
