= 1973 North Texas State Mean Green football team =

American college football season

1973 North Texas State Mean Green football

MVC co-champion
- Conference: Missouri Valley Conference
- Record: 5–5–1 (5–1 MVC)
- Head coach: Hayden Fry (1st season)
- Home stadium: Fouts Field

1973 Missouri Valley Conference football standings
	Conf.					Overall
Team	W		L		T	W		L		T
Tulsa +	5	–	1	–	0	6	–	5	–	0
North Texas State +	5	–	1	–	0	5	–	5	–	1
Louisville	3	–	2	–	0	5	–	6	–	0
New Mexico State	3	–	2	–	0	5	–	6	–	0
Wichita State	2	–	4	–	0	4	–	7	–	0
Drake	1	–	5	–	0	2	–	9	–	0
West Texas State	1	–	5	–	0	2	–	9	–	0
+ – Conference co-champions

The 1973 North Texas State Mean Green football team was an American football team that represented North Texas State University (now known as the University of North Texas) during the 1973 NCAA Division I football season as a member of the Missouri Valley Conference. In their first year under head coach Hayden Fry, the team compiled a 5–5–1 record and finished as Missouri Valley Conference co-champion.

== Schedule ==
Date	Time	Opponent	Site	Result	Attendance	Source
September 8	7:30 p.m.	vs. UT Arlington*	Texas Stadium; Irving, TX	L 7–31	19,131	
September 15		at Memphis State*	Memphis Memorial Stadium; Memphis, TN	L 3–24	25,518	
September 22	7:30 p.m.	West Texas State	Fouts Field; Denton, TX	W 32–15	11,432	
September 29	7:33 p.m.	Long Beach State*	Fouts Field; Denton, TX	T 0–0	10,378	
October 13	1:03 p.m.	at Louisville	Fairgrounds Stadium; Louisville, KY	W 7–6	15,072	
October 20	1:00 p.m.	Drake	Fouts Field; Denton, TX	W 19–7	10,500	
October 27	8:34 p.m.	at New Mexico State	Memorial Stadium; Las Cruces, NM	W 27–7	11,150	
November 3	1:01 p.m.	at Cincinnati*	Nippert Stadium; Cincinnati, OH	L 3–52	13,449	
November 10	2:05 p.m.	Wichita State^{†}	Fouts Field; Denton, TX	W 31–21	16,200	
November 17	2:00 p.m.	Tulsa	Fouts Field; Denton, TX	L 15–24	14,500	
November 24	9:30 p.m.	at San Diego State*	San Diego Stadium; San Diego, CA	L 9–56	17,383	
*Non-conference game; ^{†}Homecoming; All times are in Central time
