= 1973 McNeese State Cowboys football team =

American college football season

1973 McNeese State Cowboys football
- Conference: Southland Conference
- Record: 7–3 (2–3 Southland)
- Head coach: Jack Doland (4th season)
- Home stadium: Cowboy Stadium

1973 Southland Conference football standings
	Conf.					Overall
Team	W		L		T	W		L		T
No. 2 Louisiana Tech $^	5	–	0	–	0	12	–	1	–	0
Arkansas State	3	–	2	–	0	7	–	3	–	0
Lamar	3	–	2	–	0	5	–	5	–	0
McNeese State	2	–	3	–	0	7	–	3	–	1
UT Arlington	2	–	3	–	0	4	–	6	–	0
SW Louisiana	0	–	5	–	0	0	–	10	–	0
$ – Conference champion; ^ – NCAA Division II playoff participant; Rankings from AP small college poll

The 1973 McNeese State Cowboys football team was an American football team that represented McNeese State University as a member of the Southland Conference (Southland) during the 1973 NCAA Division II football season. In their fourth year under head coach Jack Doland, the team compiled an overall record of 7–3 with a mark of 2–3 in conference play, and finished tied for fourth in the Southland.

== Schedule ==
Date	Time	Opponent	Rank	Site	Result	Attendance	Source
September 15		Southeastern Louisiana*		Cowboy Stadium; Lake Charles, LA	W 40–10	12,700	
September 22		at Lamar	No. 13	Cowboy Stadium; Lake Charles, LA (rivalry)	W 20–17	14,000	
September 29		No. 9 Louisiana Tech	No. 12	Cowboy Stadium; Lake Charles, LA	L 7–10	15,000	
October 6	7:30 p.m.	at UT Arlington		Arlington Stadium; Arlington, TX	L 24–26	5,200–5,500	
October 13		at Northeast Louisiana*		Brown Stadium; Monroe, LA	W 16–6	5,000	
October 20		Nicholls State*		Cowboy Stadium; Lake Charles, LA	W 28–7	10,000	
October 27		Troy State*		Cowboy Stadium; Lake Charles, LA	W 21–6	12,000	
November 3		at Northwestern State*		Demon Stadium; Natchitoches, LA (rivalry)	W 14–0	9,800	
November 17		Arkansas State		Cowboy Stadium; Lake Charles, LA	L 23–26	11,000	
November 24		at Southwestern Louisiana		Cajun Field; Lafayette, LA (rivalry)	W 37–0	10,000	
*Non-conference game; Rankings from AP Poll released prior to the game; All times are in Central time
