= Rod Rust =

American football player and coach (1928–2018)

Biographical details
- Born: August 2, 1928; Webster City, Iowa, U.S.
- Died: October 23, 2018 (aged 90); Ocean City, New Jersey, U.S.

Playing career
- 1947–1948: Iowa State
- Positions: Center, linebacker

Coaching career (HC unless noted)
- 1950: Webster City HS (IA) (assistant)
- 1953: Toledo HS (IA)
- 1954–1955: Belle Plaine HS (IA)
- 1956–1958: Knoxville HS (IA)
- 1959: Ottumwa HS (IA)
- 1960–1962: New Mexico (assistant)
- 1963–1966: Stanford (assistant)
- 1967–1972: North Texas State
- 1973–1975: Montreal Alouettes (DC)
- 1976–1977: Philadelphia Eagles (LB)
- 1978–1982: Kansas City Chiefs (DC)
- 1983–1987: New England Patriots (DC)
- 1988: Kansas City Chiefs (DC)
- 1989: Pittsburgh Steelers (DC)
- 1990: New England Patriots
- 1992: New York Giants (DC)
- 1994: Lehigh (LB)
- 1995: Atlanta Falcons (LB)
- 1996: Atlanta Falcons (DC)
- 1997–1998: Montreal Alouettes (DC)
- 1999: San Francisco 49ers (assistant LB)
- 2001: Montreal Alouettes
- 2002–2004: New York Giants (LB)
- 2005: Winnipeg Blue Bombers (DC)

Administrative career (AD unless noted)
- 1970–1972: North Texas State

Head coaching record
- Overall: 29–32–1 (college); 1–15 (NFL); 9–8 (CFL)

Accomplishments and honors

Championships
- 1 MVC (1967)

Rodney Arthur Rust (August 2, 1928 – October 23, 2018) was an American football player and coach. He is best known in the United States as the head coach of the New England Patriots of the National Football League (NFL) during the 1990 season, which ended with a 1–15 record.

For most of Rust's early coaching career, he was an assistant to one of two coaches: Marv Levy or Dick Vermeil. Rust began as an assistant under Levy at the University of New Mexico between 1960 and 1962, before leaving to serve under Dick Vermeil at Stanford University. In 1967, he became the head coach at North Texas State University (now the University of North Texas), a position he held until 1972. North Texas had a 29–32–1 record during Rust's tenure.

Rust returned to work for Levy in 1973 as defensive coordinator for the Montreal Alouettes of the Canadian Football League. In his three seasons in Montreal, the Alouettes went to two Grey Cup finals, winning in 1974.

In 1976, Rust left the Alouettes to become an assistant with Vermeil's Philadelphia Eagles. He served as linebackers coach for two seasons before leaving to take the defensive coordinator position with Levy and the Kansas City Chiefs. After Levy's firing in 1982, Rust became defensive coordinator of the New England Patriots. Head coach Ron Meyer fired Rust midway through the 1984 season, but he was later reinstated (with Meyer himself fired). Rust and the Patriots went to Super Bowl XX (under head coach Raymond Berry) in 1985, but he left the team after the 1987 season. He returned to the Chiefs for the 1988 season, and moved again to the Pittsburgh Steelers in 1989.

The Patriots hired Rust as head coach in 1990. The team started out well, with a close loss to the Miami Dolphins and an equally close win over the Indianapolis Colts. The bottom quickly fell out, and the Patriots would suffer 14 straight losses, tying the 1976 Tampa Bay Buccaneers for the most consecutive losses in a single season in NFL history. Many of these losses came in humiliating fashion. They ultimately finished 1–15, the worst record in franchise history. Many of the holdovers from the Super Bowl XX team were well past their prime, and there was very little depth behind them. It showed in a ghastly -265 point differential, the worst point differential for any NFL team in the 1990s.

Rust was fired less than a week after the end of the season by newly hired CEO Sam Jankovich. The New York Giants hired Rust as defensive coordinator in 1992, and he lasted one season. He spent the rest of the 1990s as a defensive assistant with the San Francisco 49ers and Atlanta Falcons.

Rust was named the head coach of the Montreal Alouettes of the Canadian Football League in 2000, and was fired during the 2001 season after a six-game losing streak. Rust spent 2002 as the defensive quality control coach of the New York Giants. He returned to the CFL in 2005, taking the coordinator position with the Winnipeg Blue Bombers; he left abruptly halfway through the season. He became defensive coordinator of the Ottawa Renegades in February 2006; however the team suspended operations before the season began.

Rust died on October 23, 2018, at the age of 90.

== Head coaching record ==
=== College ===
| Year | Team | Overall | Conference | Standing |
|---|---|---|---|---|
North Texas State Mean Green (Missouri Valley Conference) (1967–1972)
| 1967 | North Texas State | 7–1–1 | 4–0 | 1st |
| 1968 | North Texas State | 8–2 | 4–1 | 2nd |
| 1969 | North Texas State | 7–3 | 4–1 | 2nd |
| 1970 | North Texas State | 3–8 | 1–3 | 4th |
| 1971 | North Texas State | 3–8 | 3–2 | T–2nd |
| 1972 | North Texas State | 1–10 | 0–7 | 8th |
| North Texas: | | 29–32–1 | 16–14–1 | |
| Total: | | 29–32–1 | | |
National championship Conference title Conference division title or championship game berth
