= 1973 Louisville Cardinals football team =

American college football season

1973 Louisville Cardinals football
- Conference: Missouri Valley Conference
- Record: 5–6 (3–2 MVC)
- Head coach: T. W. Alley (1st season)
- Home stadium: Fairgrounds Stadium

1973 Missouri Valley Conference football standings
	Conf.					Overall
Team	W		L		T	W		L		T
Tulsa +	5	–	1	–	0	6	–	5	–	0
North Texas State +	5	–	1	–	0	5	–	5	–	1
Louisville	3	–	2	–	0	5	–	6	–	0
New Mexico State	3	–	2	–	0	5	–	6	–	0
Wichita State	2	–	4	–	0	4	–	7	–	0
Drake	1	–	5	–	0	2	–	9	–	0
West Texas State	1	–	5	–	0	2	–	9	–	0
+ – Conference co-champions

The 1973 Louisville Cardinals football team was an American football team that represented the University of Louisville in the Missouri Valley Conference (MVC) during the 1973 NCAA Division I football season. In their first season under head coach T. W. Alley, the Cardinals compiled a 5–6 record (3–2 against conference opponents) and outscored opponents by a total of 172 to 148.

The team's statistical leaders included Len DePaola with 808 passing yards, Walter Peacock with 1,294 rushing yards and 60 points scored, and Dale Kaminski with 262 receiving yards.

== Schedule ==
Date	Time	Opponent	Site	Result	Attendance	Source
September 8		at Memphis State*	Memphis Memorial Stadium; Memphis, TN (rivalry)	L 21–28	33,164	
September 15	1:30 p.m.	at Kent State*	Dix Stadium; Kent, OH	L 3–10	10,217	
September 22	2:30 p.m.	at Drake	Drake Stadium; Des Moines, IA	W 27–17	15,700	
October 6	8:02 p.m.	Wichita State	Fairgrounds Stadium; Louisville, KY	W 24–10	28,631	
October 13	2:03 p.m.	North Texas State	Fairgrounds Stadium; Louisville, KY	L 6–7	15,072	
October 20	8:01 p.m.	Mississippi State*	Fairgrounds Stadium; Louisville, KY	L 7–18	19,005	
October 27	8:01 p.m.	Cincinnati*	Fairgrounds Stadium; Louisville, KY (The Keg of Nails)	W 10–8	14,922	
November 3	2:33 p.m.	at Tulsa	Skelly Field; Tulsa, OK	L 9–17	18,500	
November 10	2:03 p.m.	Dayton*	Fairgrounds Stadium; Louisville, KY	L 9–10	10,821	
November 17	1:58 p.m.	Furman*	Fairgrounds Stadium; Louisville, KY	W 35–14	5,118	
November 24	2:30 p.m.	at West Texas State	Kimbrough Memorial Stadium; Canyon, TX	W 21–9	4,200	
*Non-conference game; All times are in Eastern time
