= 1973 Lamar Cardinals football team =

American college football season

1973 Lamar Cardinals football
- Conference: Southland Conference
- Record: 5–5 (3–2 Southland)
- Head coach: Vernon Glass (11th season)
- Home stadium: Cardinal Stadium

1973 Southland Conference football standings
	Conf.					Overall
Team	W		L		T	W		L		T
No. 2 Louisiana Tech $^	5	–	0	–	0	12	–	1	–	0
Arkansas State	3	–	2	–	0	7	–	3	–	0
Lamar	3	–	2	–	0	5	–	5	–	0
McNeese State	2	–	3	–	0	7	–	3	–	1
UT Arlington	2	–	3	–	0	4	–	6	–	0
SW Louisiana	0	–	5	–	0	0	–	10	–	0
$ – Conference champion; ^ – NCAA Division II playoff participant; Rankings from AP small college poll

The 1973 Lamar Cardinals football team represented Lamar University as a member of the Southland Conference during the 1973 NCAA Division II football season. Led by 11th-year head coach Vernon Glass, the Cardinals compiled an overall record of 5–5 with a mark of 3–2 in conference play, tying for second place in the Southland. Lamar played home games at Cardinal Stadium in Beaumont, Texas.

== Schedule ==
Date	Time	Opponent	Site	Result	Attendance	Source
September 8		at New Mexico State*	Memorial Stadium; Las Cruces, NM	L 7–24	15,992	
September 15		Howard Payne*	Cardinal Stadium; Beaumont, TX	W 21–17	13,220	
September 22		at No. 13 McNeese State	Cowboy Stadium; Lake Charles, LA (Battle of the Border)	L 17–20	14,000	
September 29		at Drake*	Drake Stadium; Des Moines, IA	L 10–24		
October 6		West Texas State*	Cardinal Stadium; Beaumont, TX	L 0–13	9,796	
October 13		at UTEP*	Sun Bowl; El Paso, TX	W 31–27	8,775	
October 20		Southwestern Louisiana	Cardinal Stadium; Beaumont, TX (rivalry)	W 31–0	9,079	
October 27		Arkansas State	Cardinal Stadium; Beaumont, TX	W 10–7	9,900	
November 10		No. 5 Louisiana Tech	Cardinal Stadium; Beaumont, TX	L 3–17	10,200	
November 24	3:00 p.m.	UT Arlington	Arlington Stadium; Arlington, TX	W 10–3	3,000	
*Non-conference game; Rankings from AP Poll released prior to the game; All times are in Central time
