= 1973 Tulsa Golden Hurricane football team =

American college football season

1973 Tulsa Golden Hurricane football

MVC champion
- Conference: Missouri Valley Conference
- Record: 6–5 (5–1 MVC)
- Head coach: F. A. Dry (2nd season)
- Home stadium: Skelly Stadium

1973 Missouri Valley Conference football standings
	Conf.					Overall
Team	W		L		T	W		L		T
Tulsa +	5	–	1	–	0	6	–	5	–	0
North Texas State +	5	–	1	–	0	5	–	5	–	1
Louisville	3	–	2	–	0	5	–	6	–	0
New Mexico State	3	–	2	–	0	5	–	6	–	0
Wichita State	2	–	4	–	0	4	–	7	–	0
Drake	1	–	5	–	0	2	–	9	–	0
West Texas State	1	–	5	–	0	2	–	9	–	0
+ – Conference co-champions

The 1973 Tulsa Golden Hurricane football team represented the University of Tulsa during the 1973 NCAA Division I football season. In their second year under head coach F. A. Dry, the Golden Hurricane compiled a 6–5 record, 5–1 against conference opponents, and won the Missouri Valley Conference co-championship.

The team's statistical leaders included Joe McCulley with 1,579 passing yards, Freddie Carolina with 540 rushing yards, and Steve Largent with 501 receiving yards. Largent went on to play 14 years in the National Football League and was inducted into the Pro Football Hall of Fame.

== Schedule ==
Date	Time	Opponent	Site	Result	Attendance	Source
September 15	7:30 p.m.	West Texas State	Skelly Stadium; Tulsa, OK	W 48–3	27,000	
September 22		at Kansas State*	KSU Stadium; Manhattan, KS	L 0–21	27,500	
September 29	7:30 p.m.	Cincinnati*	Skelly Stadium; Tulsa, OK	W 16–13	24,000	
October 6		Drake	Skelly Stadium; Tulsa, OK	W 44–7	23,500	
October 13		at Memphis State*	Memphis Memorial Stadium; Memphis, TN	L 16–28	10,420	
October 20		New Mexico State^{†}	Skelly Stadium; Tulsa, OK	W 52–14	20,000	
October 27		at Arkansas*	War Memorial Stadium; Little Rock, AR	L 6–20	42,341	
November 3	1:33 p.m.	Louisville	Skelly Stadium; Tulsa, OK	W 17–9	18,500	
November 17	2:00 p.m.	at North Texas State	Fouts Field; Denton, TX	W 24–15	14,800	
November 24	1:30 p.m.	at Wichita State	Cessna Stadium; Wichita, KS	L 19–28	6,548	
December 1		at No. 14 Houston*	Houston Astrodome; Houston, TX	L 16–35	21,500–21,590	
*Non-conference game; ^{†}Homecoming; Rankings from AP Poll released prior to the game; All times are in Central time

== After the season ==
=== 1974 NFL draft ===
The following Golden Hurricane players were selected in the 1974 NFL draft following the season.

Round	Pick	Player	Position	NFL club
9	210	Danny Colbert	Defensive back	San Diego Chargers
10	236	Ray Rhodes	Defensive back	New York Giants
11	273	T. C. Blair	Tight end	Detroit Lions
