= Wichita State University football team plane crash =

1970 aviation accident in Colorado

Wichita State University crash
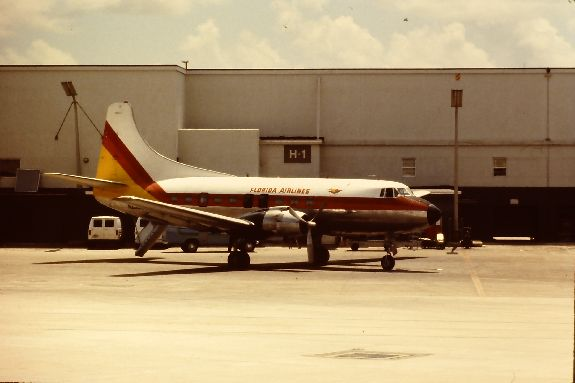
- A Martin 404 circa 1981, in Florida Airlines livery.

Accident
- Date: October 2, 1970
- Summary: Controlled flight into terrain due to pilot error
- Site: Clear Creek County, Colorado 8 miles (13 km) west of Silver Plume, near the Loveland Ski Area; 39°41′36″N 105°52′57″W

Aircraft
- Aircraft type: Martin 4-0-4
- Operator: Golden Eagle Aviation Inc
- Registration: N464M
- Flight origin: Wichita Mid-Continent Airport
- Stopover: Stapleton International Airport
- Destination: Logan-Cache Airport
- Occupants: 40
- Passengers: 37
- Crew: 3
- Fatalities: 31
- Injuries: 9
- Survivors: 9

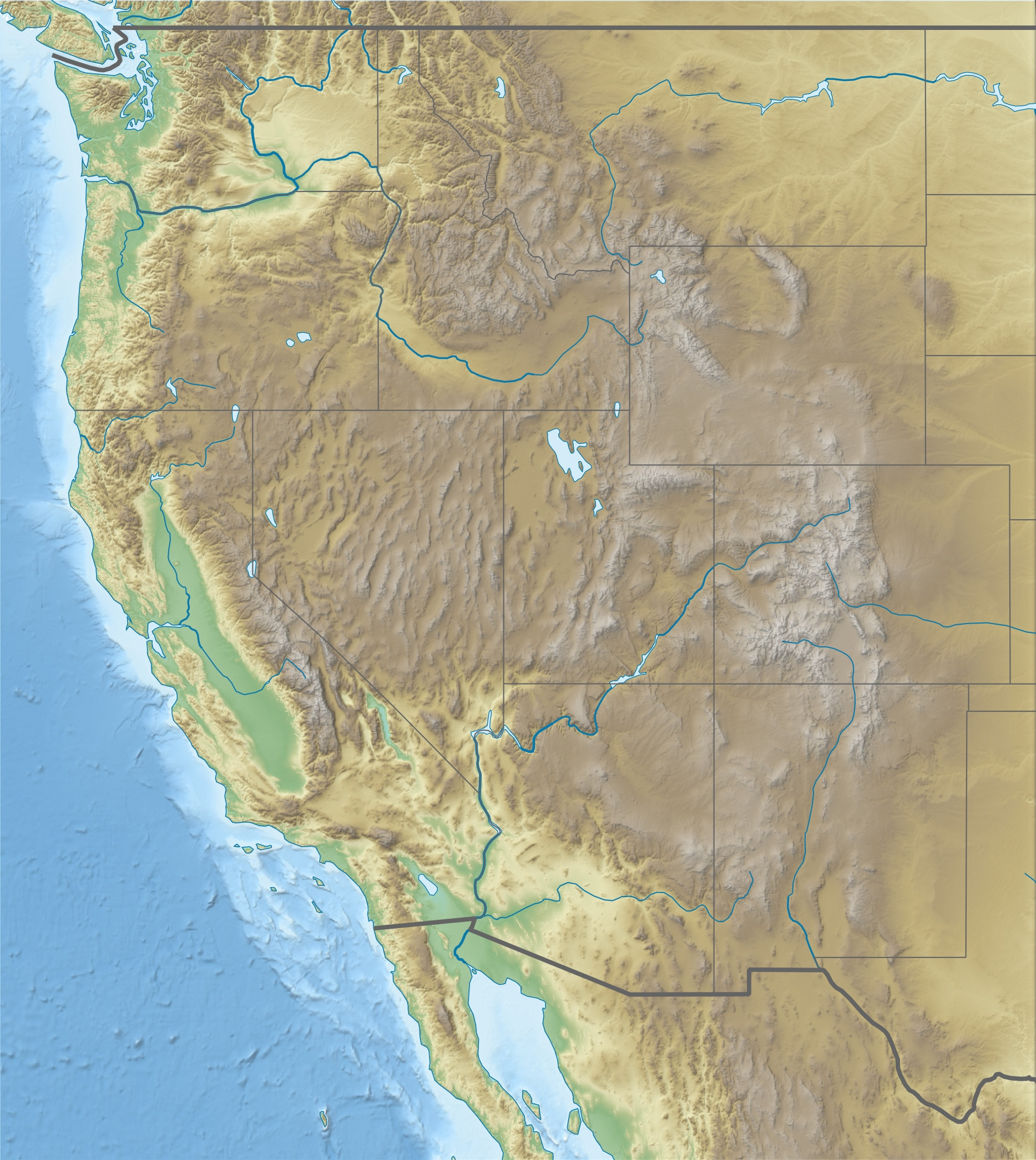
Location in the western United States

In clear and calm weather in Colorado at 1:14 p.m. MDT on Friday, October 2, 1970, a chartered Martin 4-0-4 airliner crashed into a mountain eight miles (13 km) west of Silver Plume. Operated by Golden Eagle Aviation Inc., the twin-engine propliner carried 37 passengers and a crew of three, of whom 29 were killed at the scene and two later died of their injuries while under medical care.

It was one of two aircraft carrying the 1970 Wichita State Shockers football team to Logan, Utah for a game against Utah State. The second aircraft flew a conventional route and arrived safely in Utah. Pilot error, including inadvisable in-flight decisions and inadequate preflight planning, was identified as the probable cause of the crash.

== Background ==
About three months before the crash, Wichita State University contracted with Golden Eagle Aviation to supply a Douglas DC-6B to fly the team to away games for the 1970 season. The four-engined DC-6 was a large, powerful aircraft that could accommodate the entire team. Golden Eagle Aviation did not own the DC-6, but had an arrangement with the Jack Richards Aircraft Company to use it. After the agreements were made, the DC-6 was damaged in a windstorm, rendering it unavailable for use. A pair of Martin 4-0-4s, neither of which had flown since 1967, were recertified for flight. On October 2, 1970, these planes were ferried from the Jack Richards facilities in Oklahoma City to Wichita in place of the DC-6.

== Initial leg ==
Upon arrival in Wichita, the two aircraft were loaded with luggage and the passengers boarded. The plane took flight and headed west to a refueling stopover in Denver at Stapleton Airport, from where it would continue to Logan Airport in northern Utah.

The two aircraft were dubbed "Gold" and "Black" after the school colors. "Gold," the aircraft that later crashed, carried the starting players, head coach, and athletic director, as well as their wives, other administrators, boosters, and family. The designated "Black" plane transported the reserve players, assistant coaches, and other support personnel.

Ronald G. Skipper, the 35-year-old president of Golden Eagle Aviation, was the pilot flying "Gold." Although occupying the left seat, he was acting in the capacity of a first officer because he did not have a type rating on the Martin 4-0-4. During the flight to Denver, he visited passengers in the cabin, advising them that after refueling they would take a scenic route near Loveland Ski Area and Mount Sniktau, the proposed alpine skiing venues for the 1976 Winter Olympics, recently awarded to Denver in May. The captain of the "Gold" aircraft was 27-year-old Daniel E. "Danny" Crocker, who occupied the right seat. The other crew flying the "Black" aircraft adhered to the original flight plan and took a more northerly route, heading north from Denver to southern Wyoming then west, using a designated airway. Although less scenic, this route allowed more time to gain altitude for the climb over the Rocky Mountains.

== Accident sequence ==
While the aircraft was refueled and serviced in Denver, Skipper purchased aeronautical sectional charts for the planned scenic route. In his testimony before the National Transportation Safety Board (NTSB), Skipper asserted that he had intended to use the charts to identify landmarks and objects of interest to the passengers. The NTSB's report concluded that the crew did not allow enough time for the charts to be studied properly to avoid high terrain before takeoff commenced. After takeoff in clear weather, the two aircraft took divergent paths away from Denver.

Shortly before the crash, several witnesses described seeing an aircraft flying unusually low toward the Continental Divide. Some witnesses located on higher mountainside locations, such as Loveland Pass at 11,990 feet (3,655 m), reported seeing it flying below them. Crash survivor Rick Stephens was a senior guard and stated in 2013, "...as we flew along over I-70, that there were old mines and old vehicles above us. I noticed we were quite a bit below the top of the mountains. I got up to go to the cockpit, which wasn't unusual to do, and I could tell we were in trouble, looking out the window and seeing nothing but green in front of us."

The overloaded aircraft, nearing Loveland Pass as it flew up Clear Creek Valley, became trapped in a box canyon and was unable to climb above the mountain ridges surrounding it on three sides, nor could it complete a reversal turn away from the sharply rising terrain. At 1:14 p.m. MDT, the "Gold" aircraft struck trees on the east slope of Mount Trelease, 1,600 feet (490 m) below its summit, and crashed. The NTSB report indicated that many people survived the initial impact, based on the testimony of survivors and rescuers. The plane's fuel did not explode immediately, allowing survivors to escape the wreckage, but the passenger cabin was eventually consumed by an explosion before those still alive and trapped inside could escape.

Of the 40 people on board, 29 died at the scene, including 27 passengers, the captain and the flight attendant. One of the victims was an off-duty flight attendant who was assisting the crew. Two of the initial 11 survivors later died of their injuries to bring the total dead to 31, 14 of whom were Wichita State football players. First to arrive at the crash scene were construction workers from the nearby Eisenhower Tunnel project and motorists on U.S. Route 6 (I-70). Skipper, who was flying the plane from the left seat, survived.

== Probable cause ==
The National Transportation Safety Board report states that weather played no role in the accident, and lists the probable cause to be that the pilot made improper decisions during the flight or in his planning:

The intentional operation of the aircraft over a mountain valley route at an altitude from which the aircraft could neither climb over the obstructing terrain ahead, nor execute a successful course reversal. Significant factors were the overloaded condition of the aircraft, the virtual absence of flight planning for the chosen route of flight from Denver to Logan, a lack of understanding on the part of the crew of the performance capabilities and limitations of the aircraft, and the lack of operational management to monitor and appropriately control the actions of the flightcrew.

== Aftermath ==
The Wichita State University president, vice president, provost, athletic director, and athletic information officer were all unavailable in the immediate aftermath of the crash, leaving the game to be canceled by John S. Flannery, a WSU Information Services employee. Utah State's football team held a memorial service at the stadium where the game was to have been played and placed a wreath on the 50-yard line. WSU officials and family members of the survivors were flown to Denver on an aircraft made available by Kansas governor Robert Docking.

Classes at Wichita State were canceled for Monday, October 5, and a memorial service was held that evening on campus at Cessna Stadium. The remaining members of the Wichita State team, with the NCAA and Missouri Valley Conference both allowing freshman players to fill the team's vacant roster spots, decided to continue the 1970 season, which was later designated the "Second Season."

Wichita State and Utah State had played in five of the previous six seasons but would never play each other again in football. Wichita State discontinued varsity football after the 1986 season.

The accident was the first of two college-football charter aircraft to crash in 1970; six weeks later, Southern Airways Flight 932, carrying the Marshall University team, crashed in Huntington, West Virginia as the team returned from a game in North Carolina.

== Casualties ==
Out of the 31 victims of the crash, 29 of them were pronounced dead at the scene while two more would succumb to complications of their injuries received over the course of 26 days. The following casualties have been identified as:

Crew Members

- Crocker, Daniel E. (27), pilot

== Memorials ==
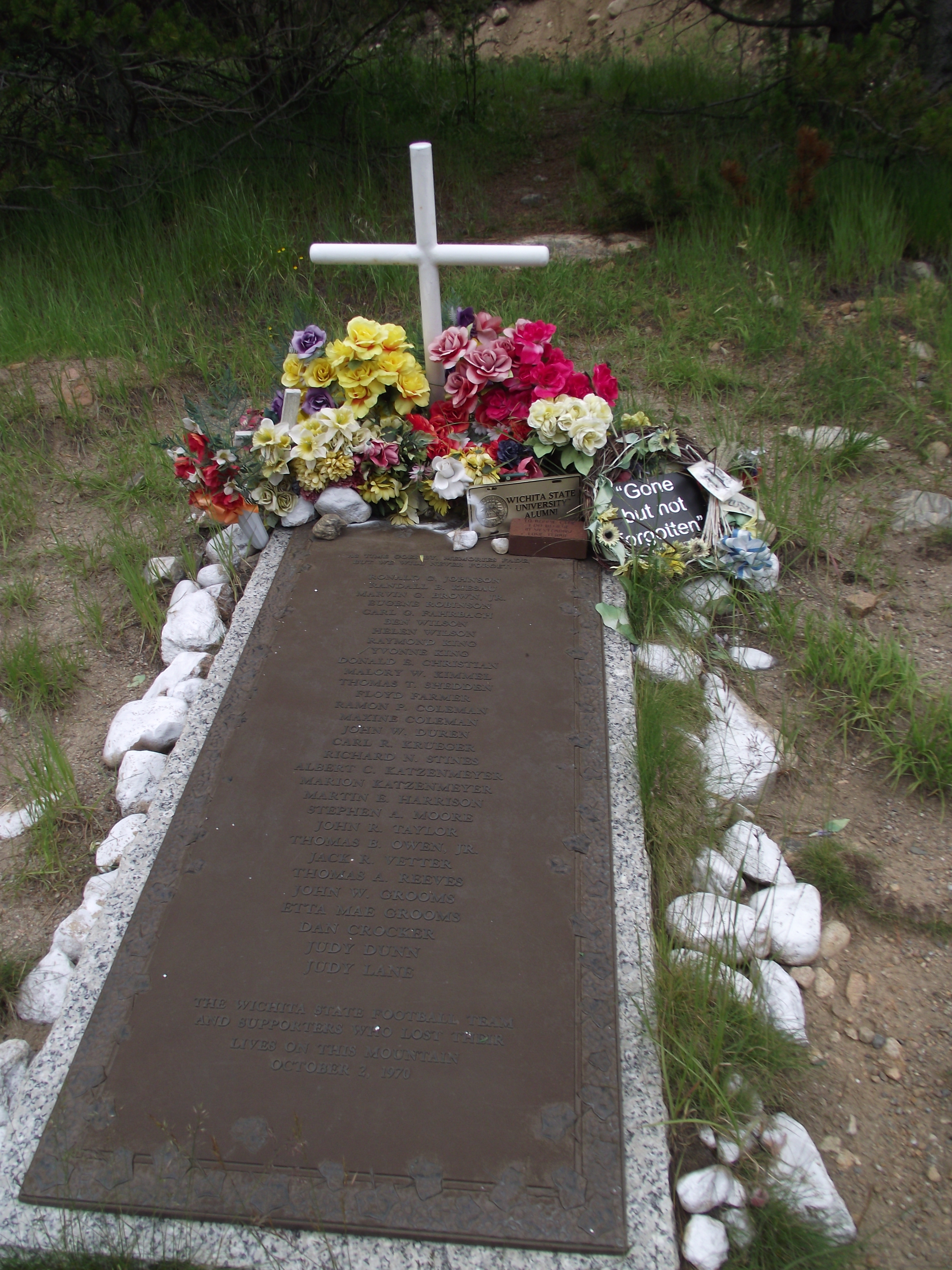
Roadside memorial in Colorado on Interstate 70, milepost 217

Wichita State University built a memorial for those who died from the crash called Memorial '70. Every year on October 2 at 9 a.m., a wreath is placed at the memorial.

A roadside memorial plaque listing the names of the victims is located near the Colorado crash site, adjacent to westbound Interstate 70, at Dry Gulch at milepost 217 (39.6965°N 105.8736°W), about two miles (3 km) east of the Eisenhower Tunnel. A trail to the wreck site via Dry Gulch is 0.4 miles past the memorial off exit 216.

Entertainers Bill Cosby and Monty Hall hosted a fundraiser for the Wichita State athletic department after the crash.

== Crash site makeshift memorial gallery ==
=== Photographs of the crash site in September 2024 ===
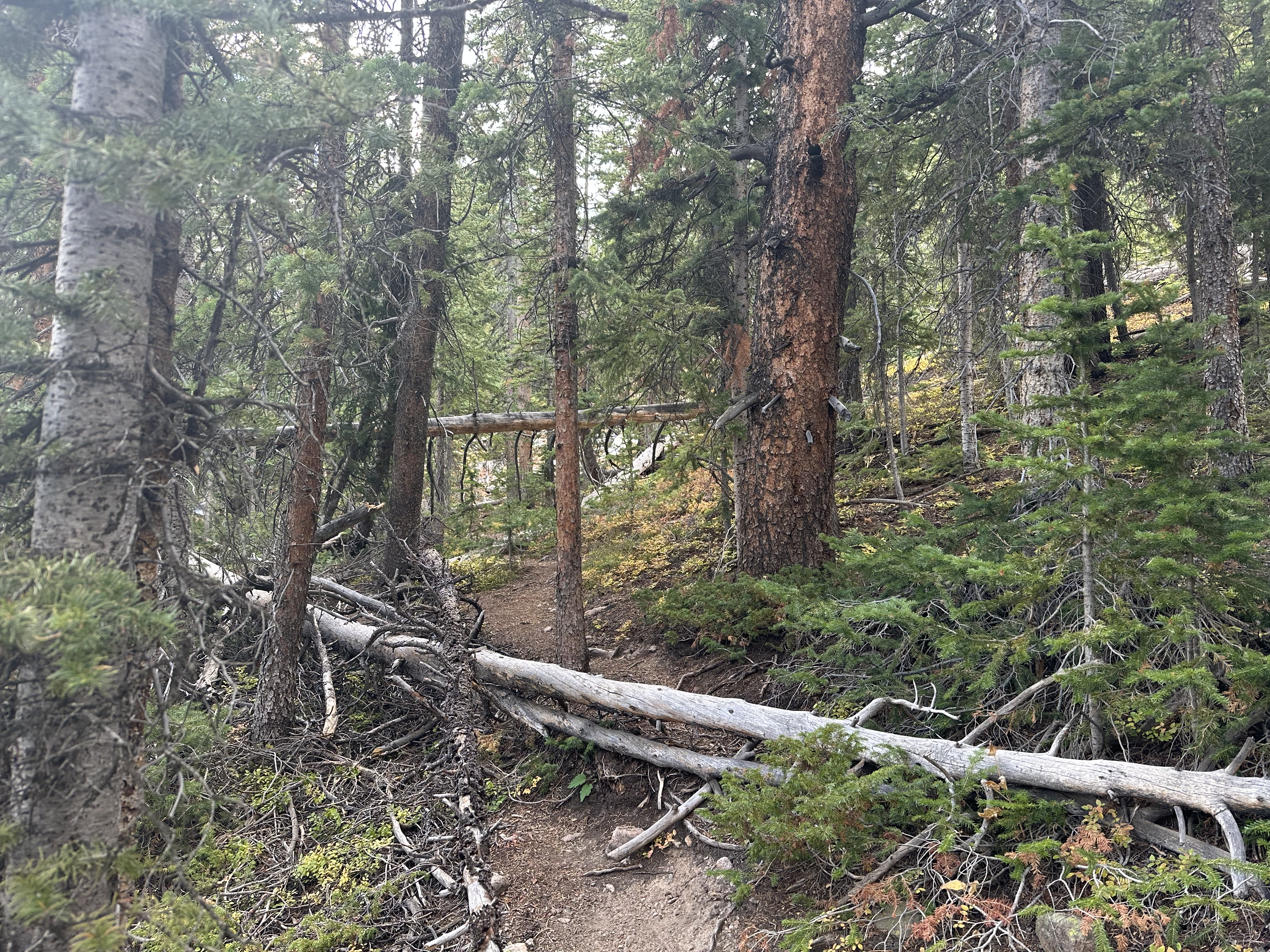
A forested hiking path winds through trees with fallen logs crossing the trail, leading through a dense woodland.

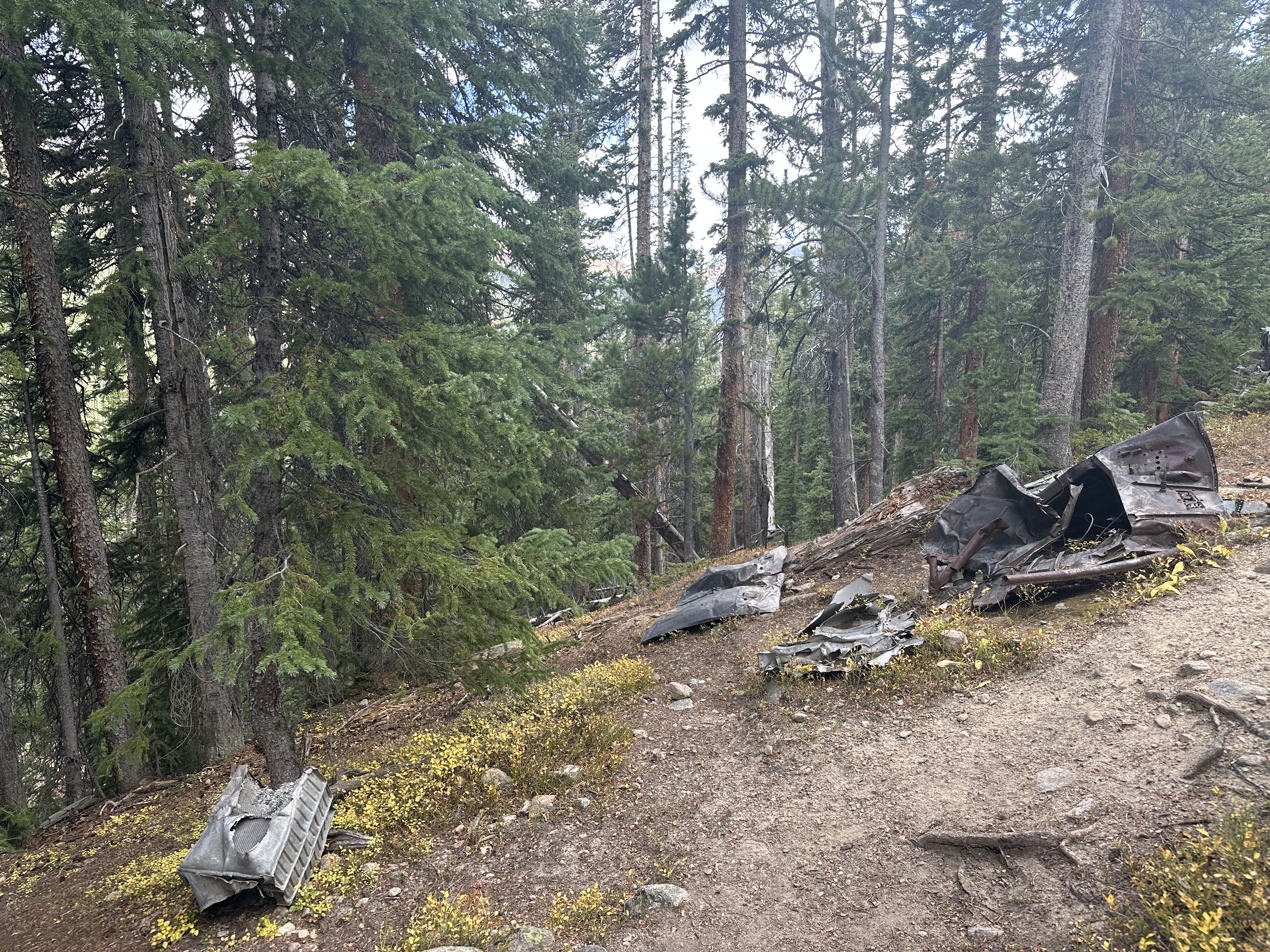
Pieces of metal wreckage lie scattered on a forested slope at the Wichita State University football team plane crash site.

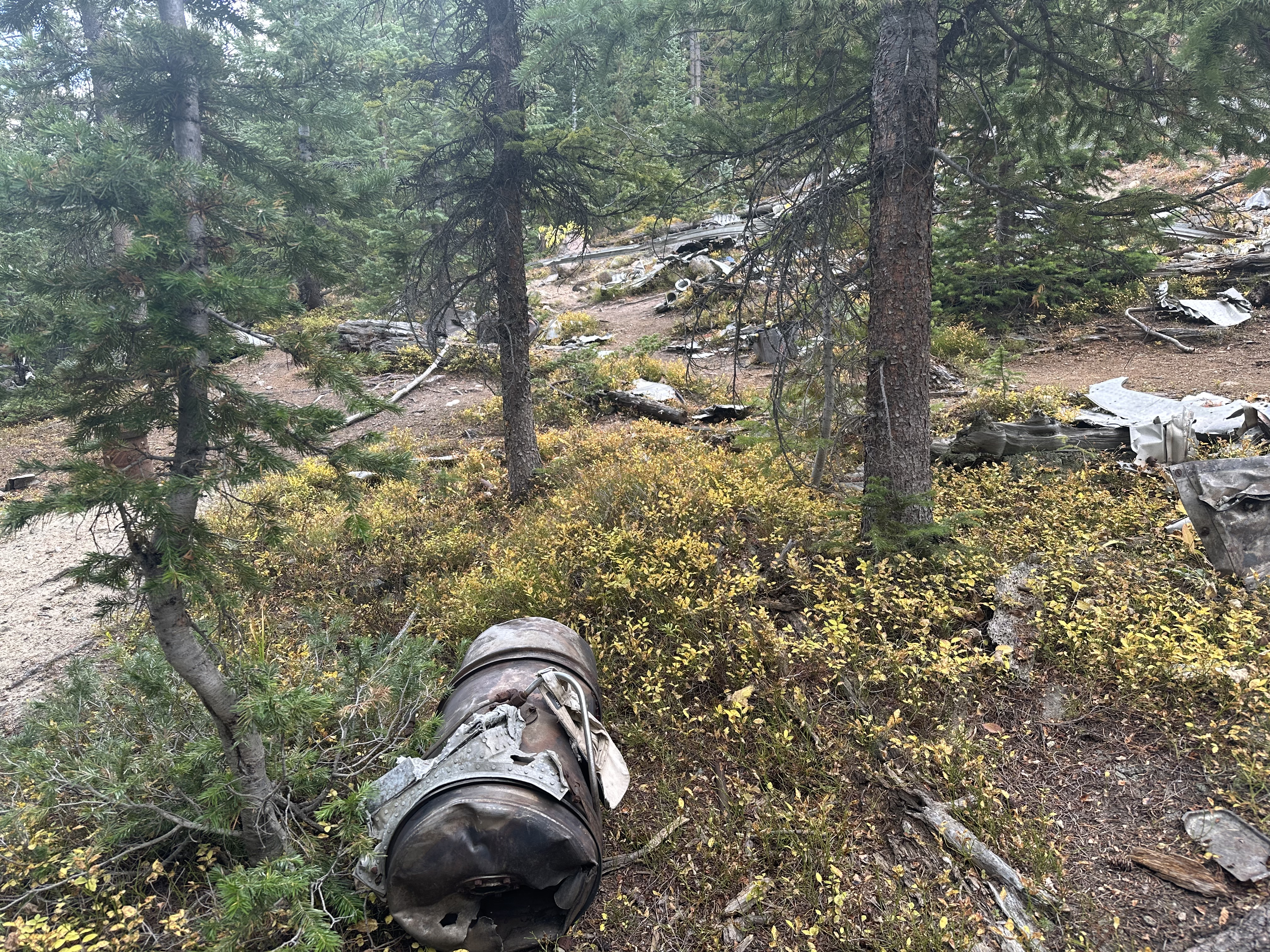
A large piece of cylindrical aircraft wreckage lies among trees and vegetation at the Wichita State University football team plane crash site.

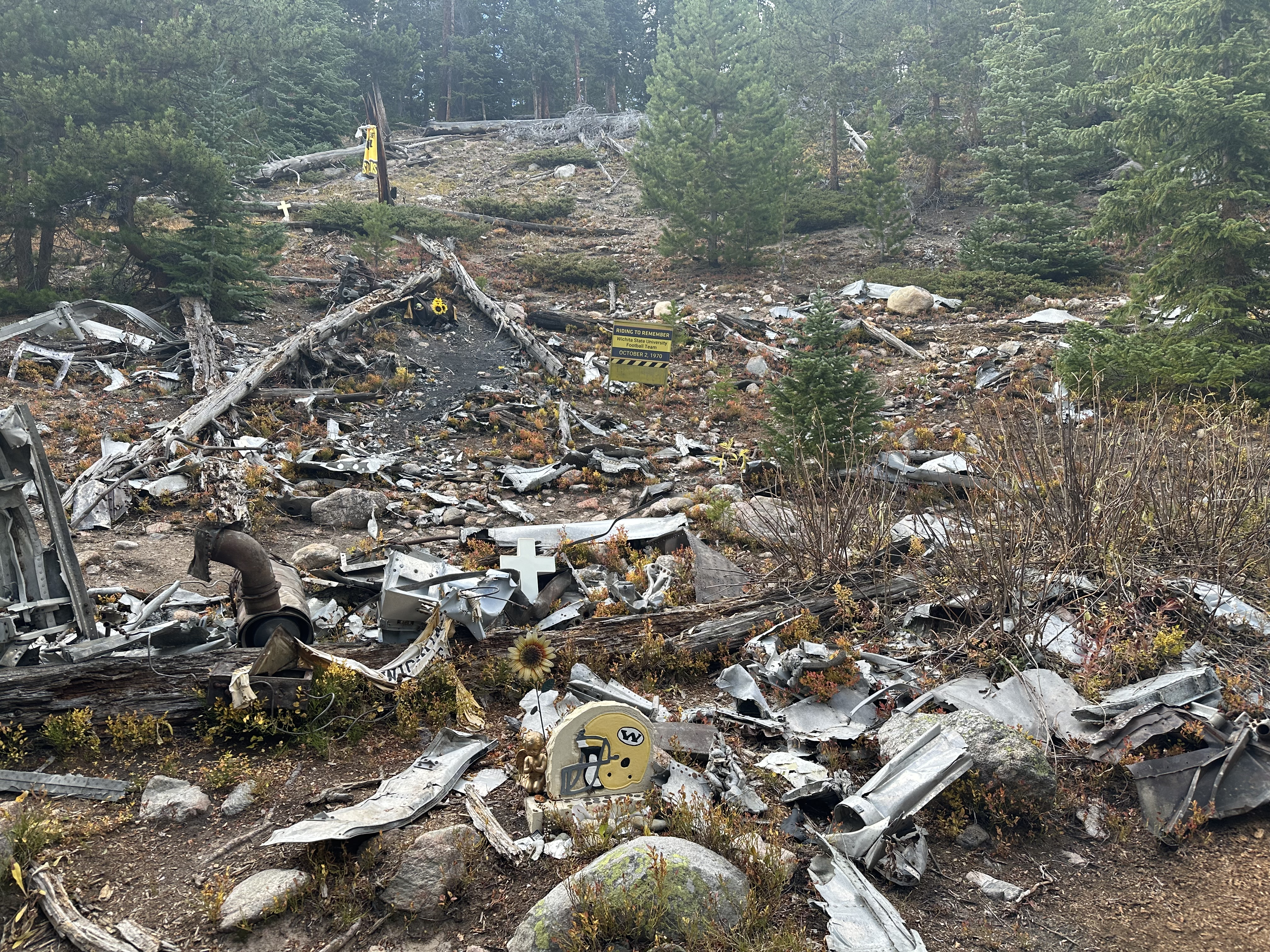
Wreckage from the Wichita State University football team plane crash site is spread across a forested hillside, with several memorial markers and tributes visible, including a football helmet and a sign.

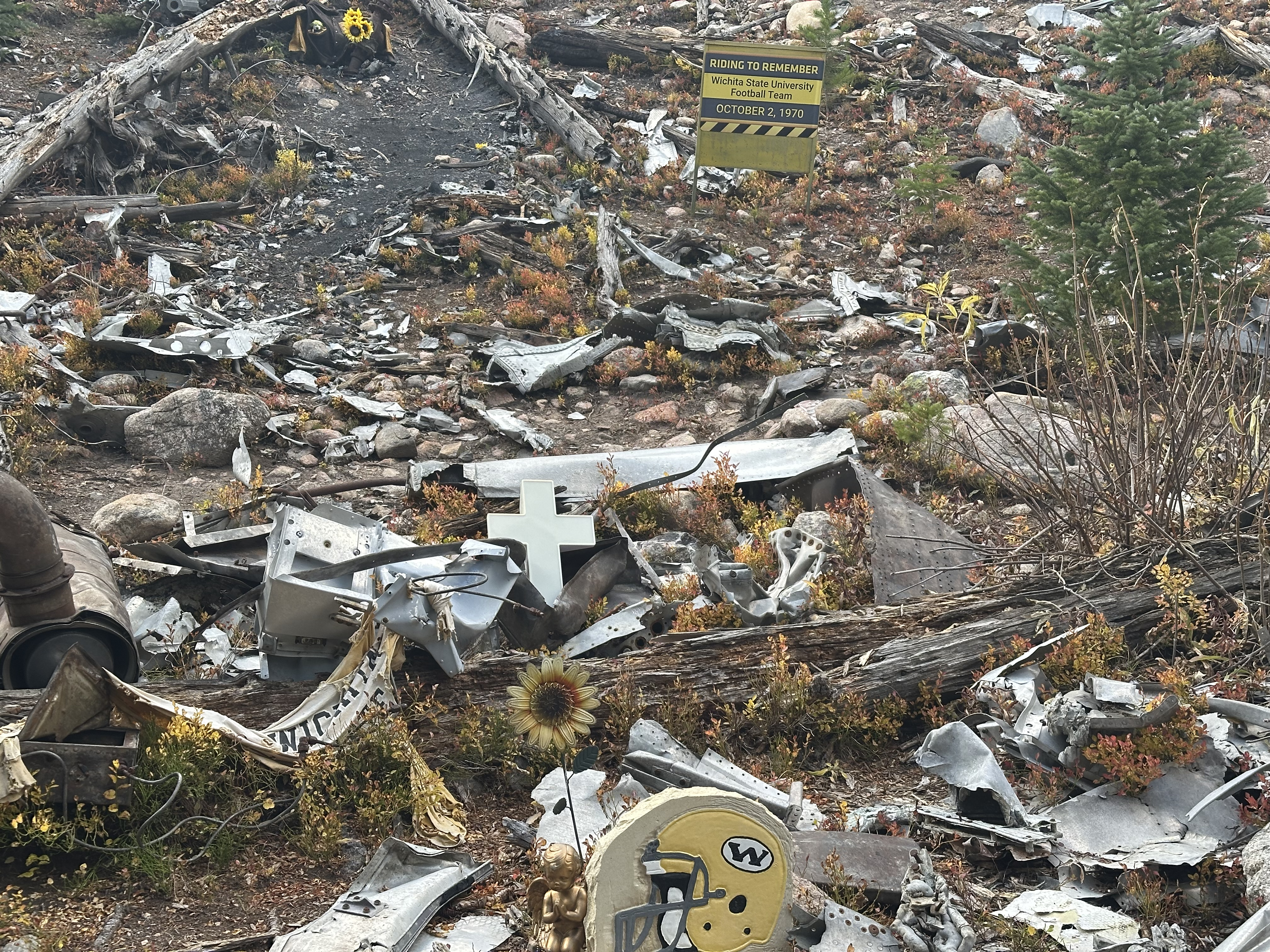
Wreckage and personal tributes, including a small cross and a Wichita State football helmet, are scattered near a memorial sign for the Wichita State University football team.

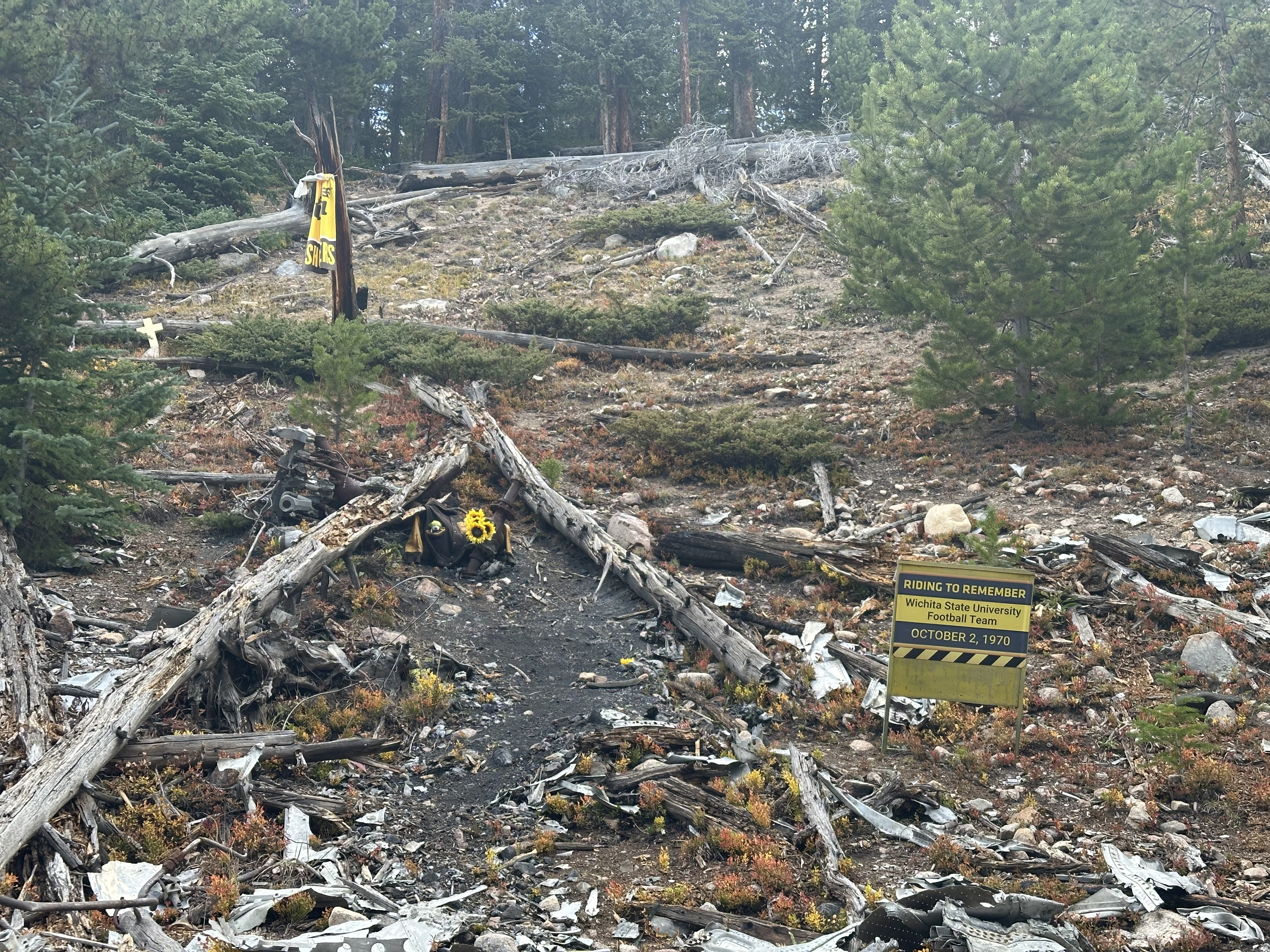
A memorial site for the Wichita State University football team plane crash, featuring a sign, a cross, a jersey, and various tributes scattered across the hillside.

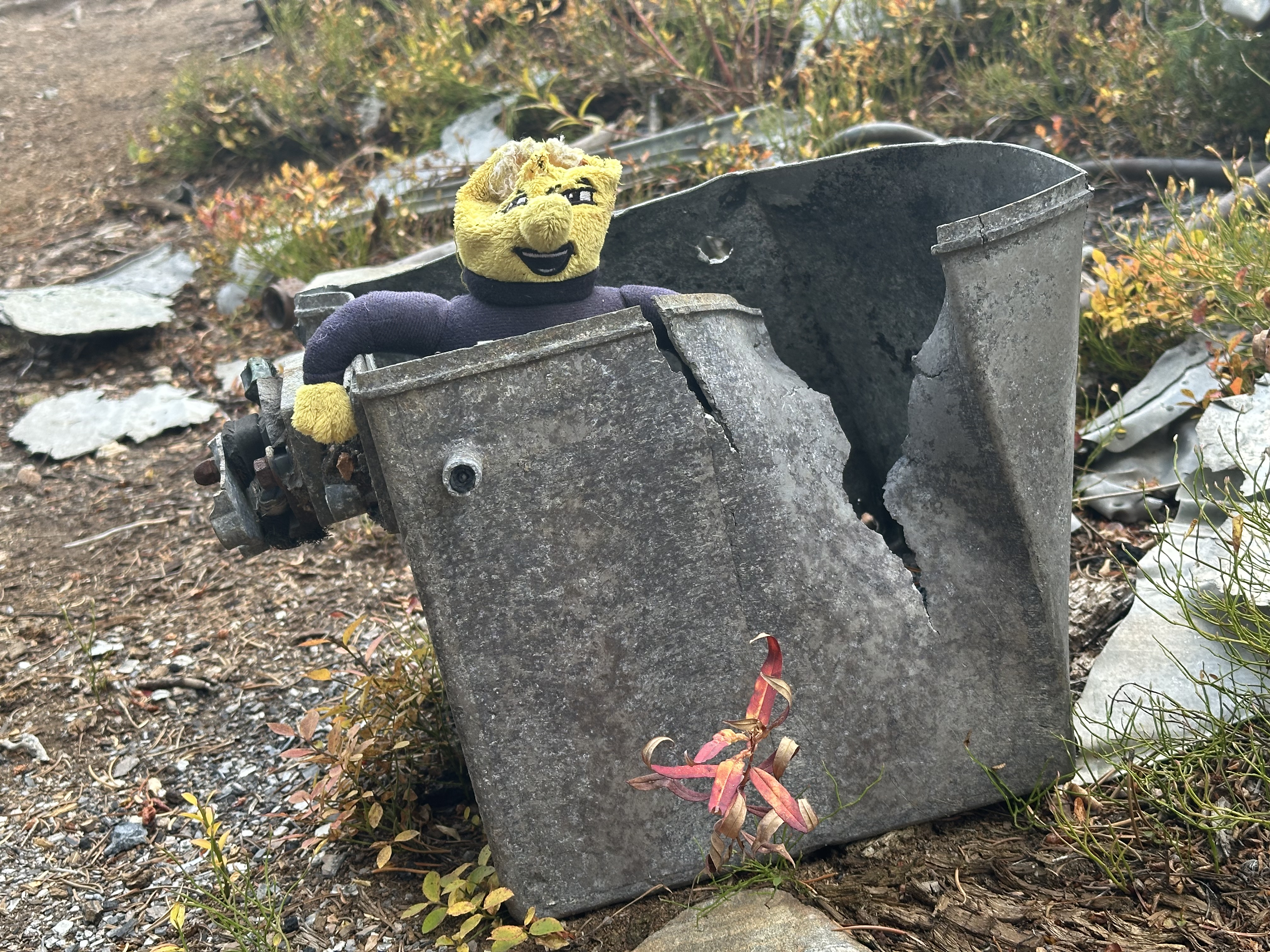
A small, yellow plush mascot figure is placed inside a piece of cracked metal wreckage at the Wichita University football team plane crash site.

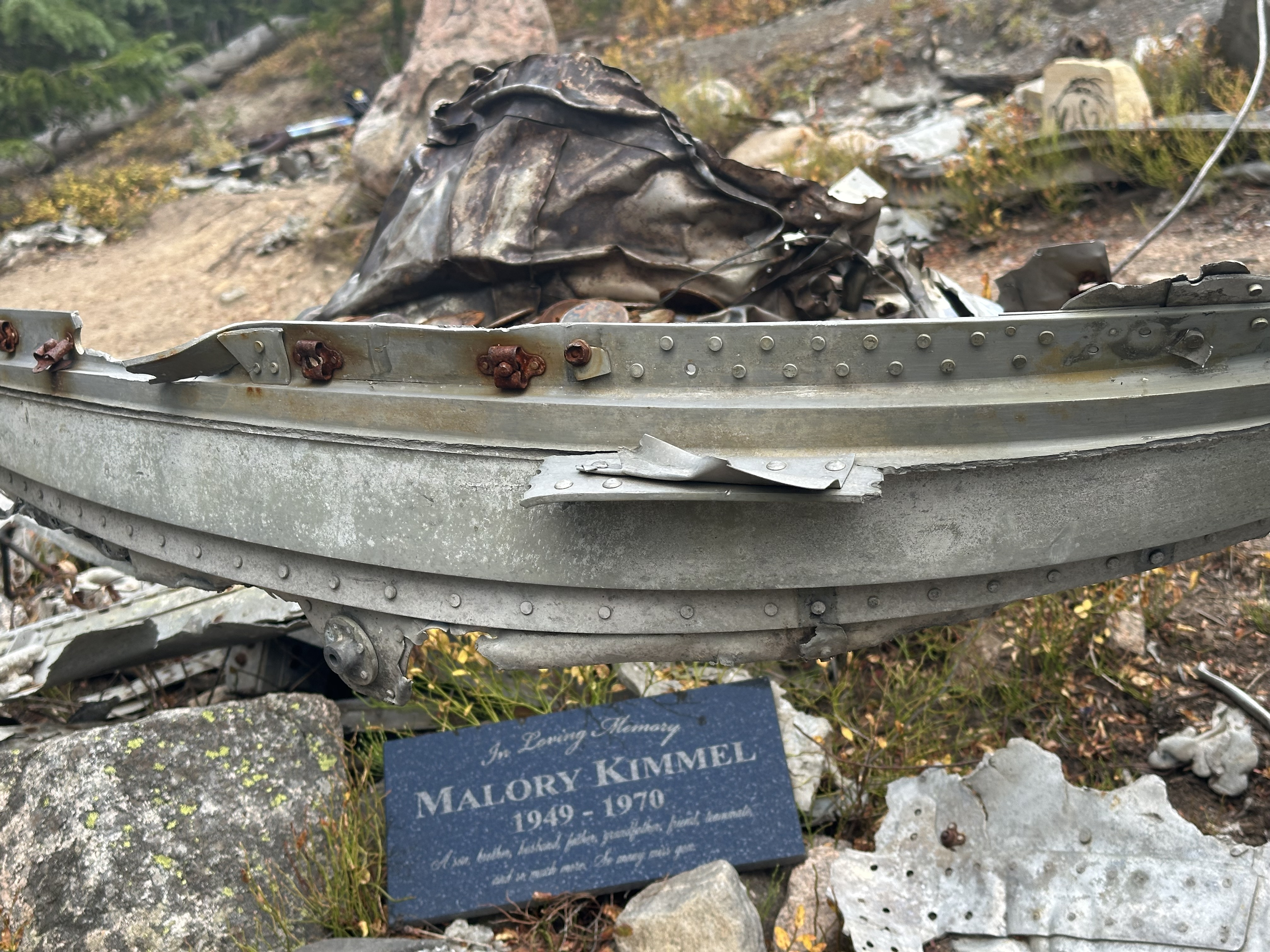
A piece of metal aircraft wreckage is shown above a memorial plaque honoring Malory Kimmel, a victim of the Wichita University football team plane crash.

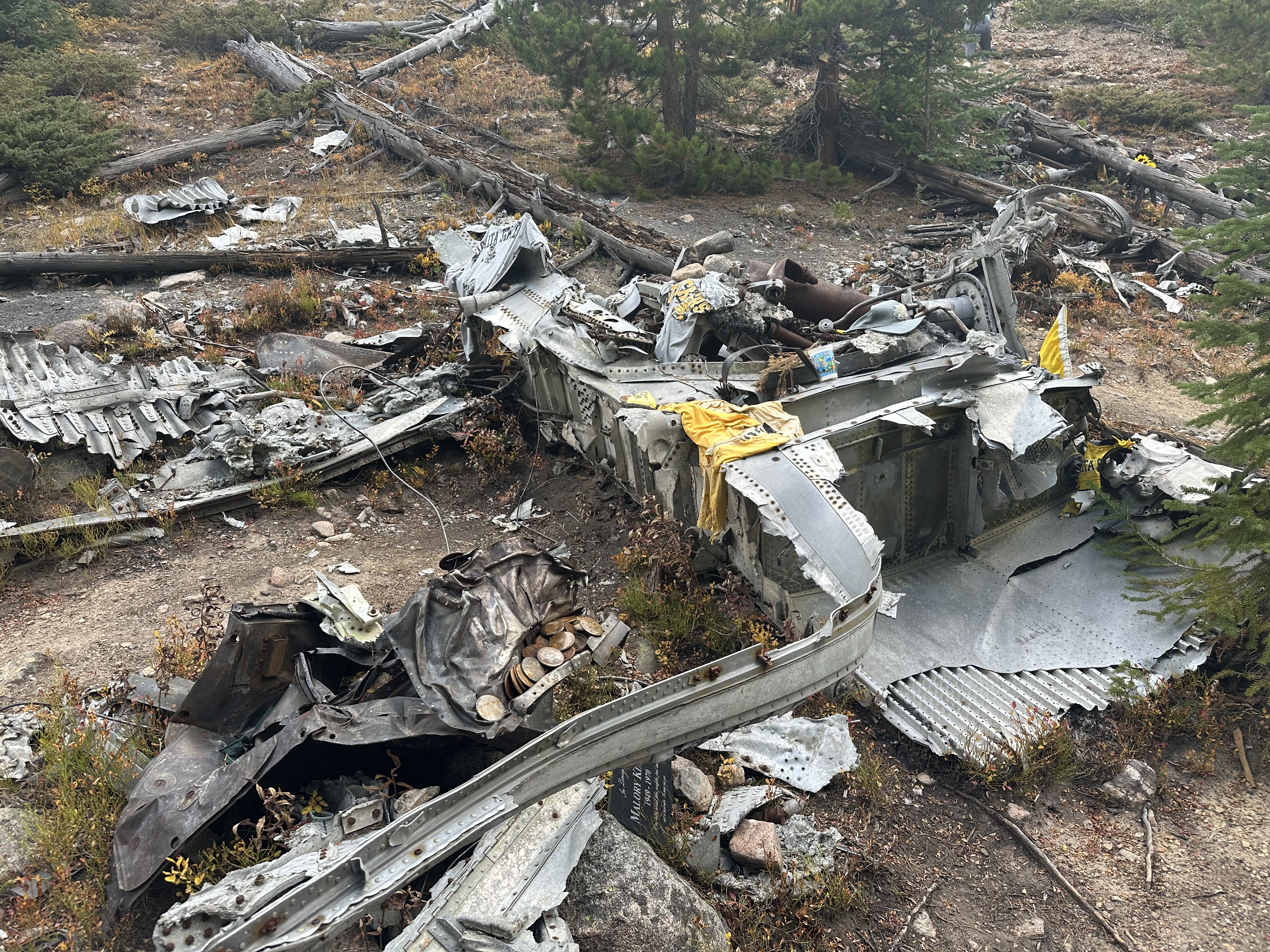
A large section of aircraft wreckage lies scattered across a forested hillside, with yellow fabric draped over part of the debris.

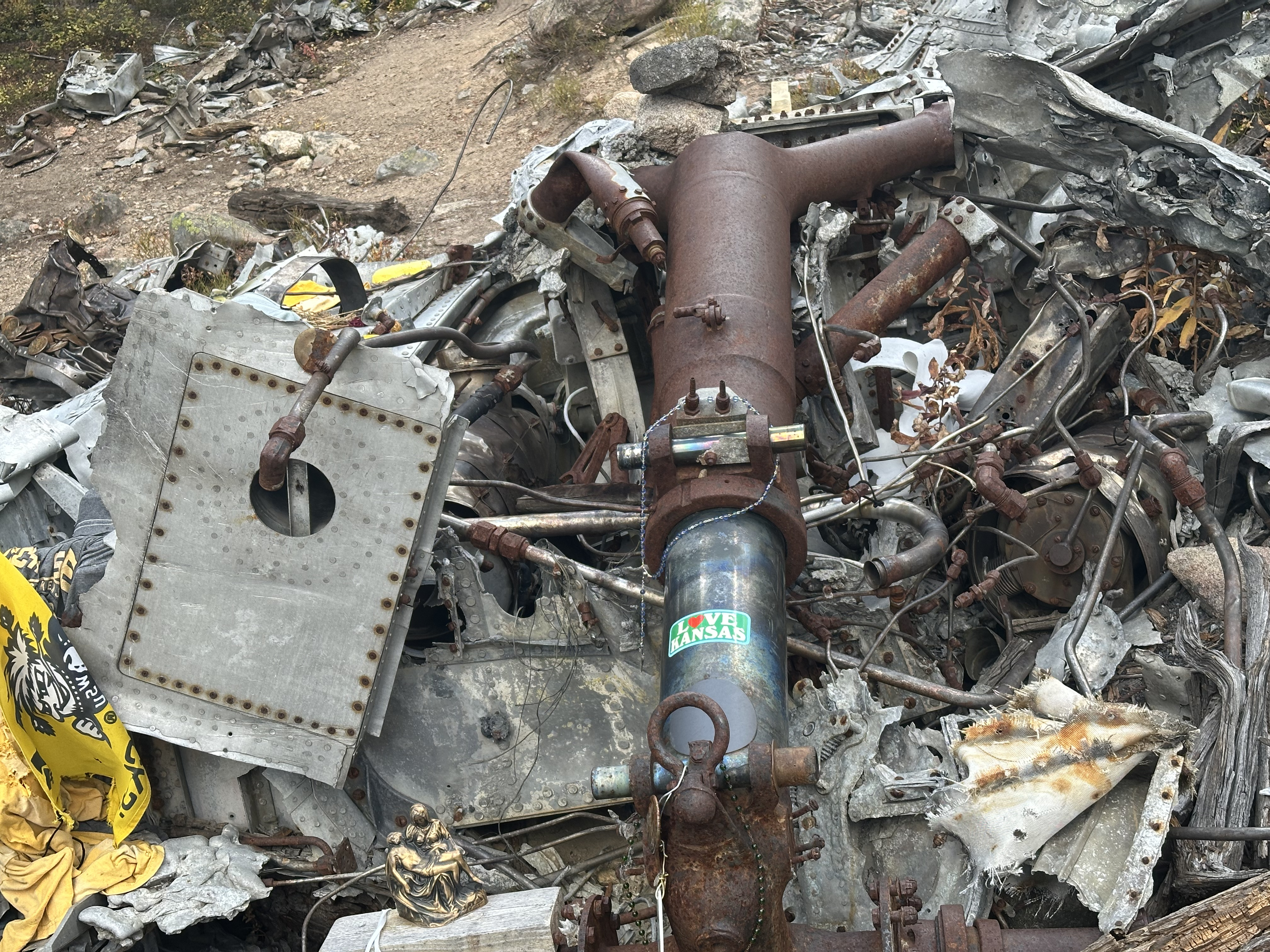
A large piece of rusted aircraft machinery lies amidst twisted metal wreckage, with a Kansas sticker and a small religious statue placed nearby.

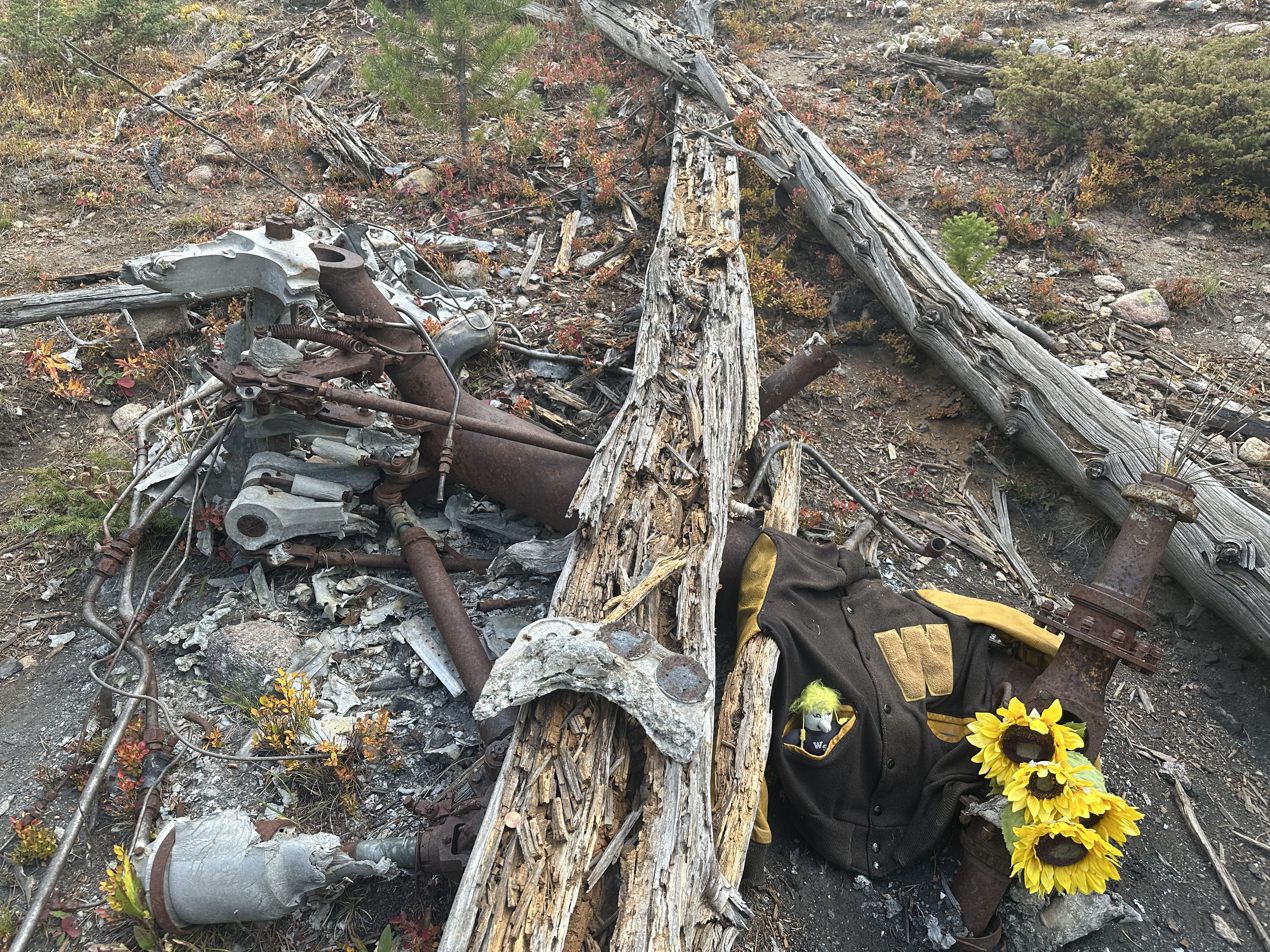
A piece of wreckage is intertwined with logs at a memorial site, where a Wichita State jacket and a bouquet of sunflowers have been placed.

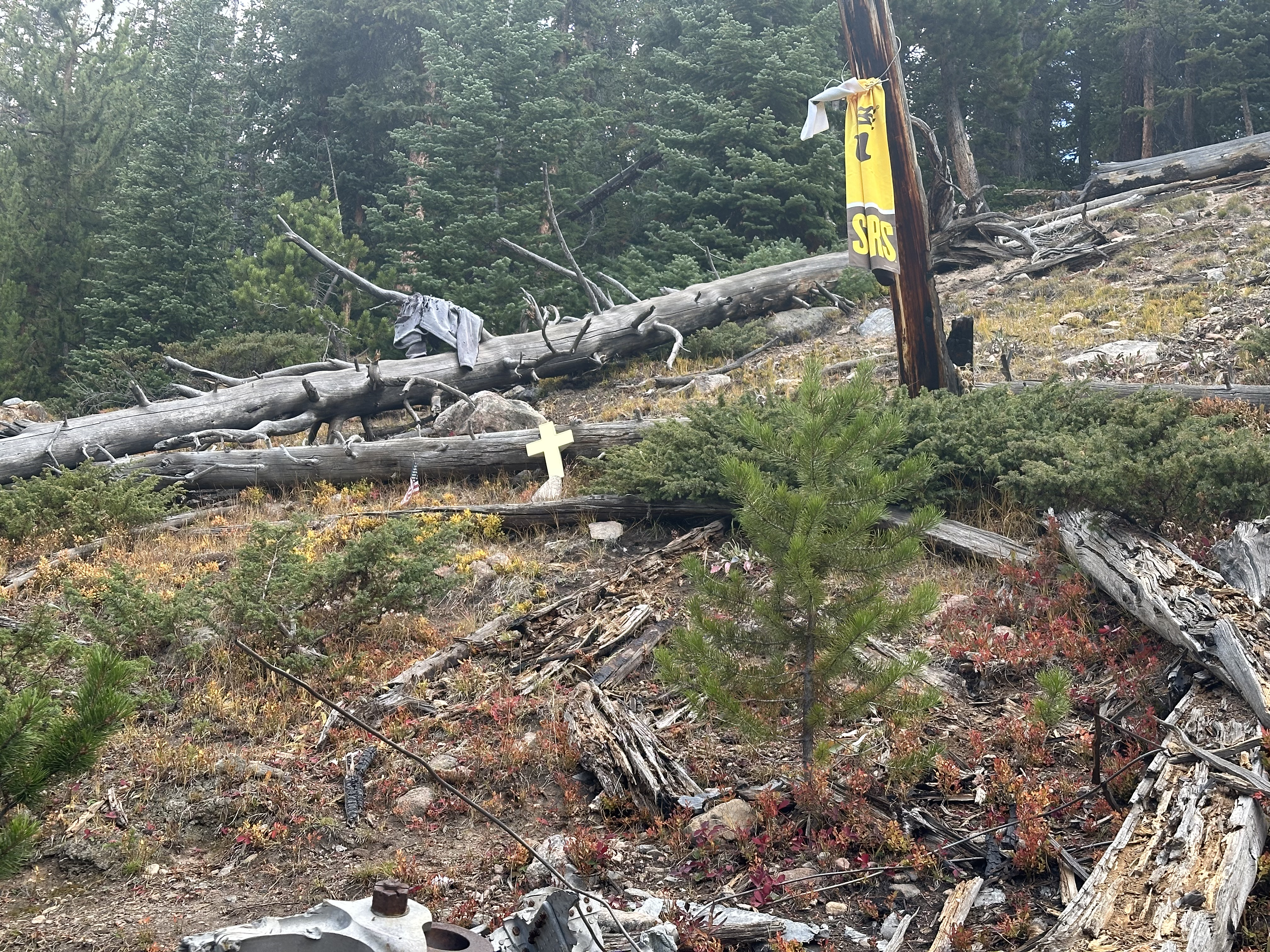
A yellow jersey hangs from a tree at a memorial site near the Wichita University plane crash location, with a cross and fallen logs visible in the background.

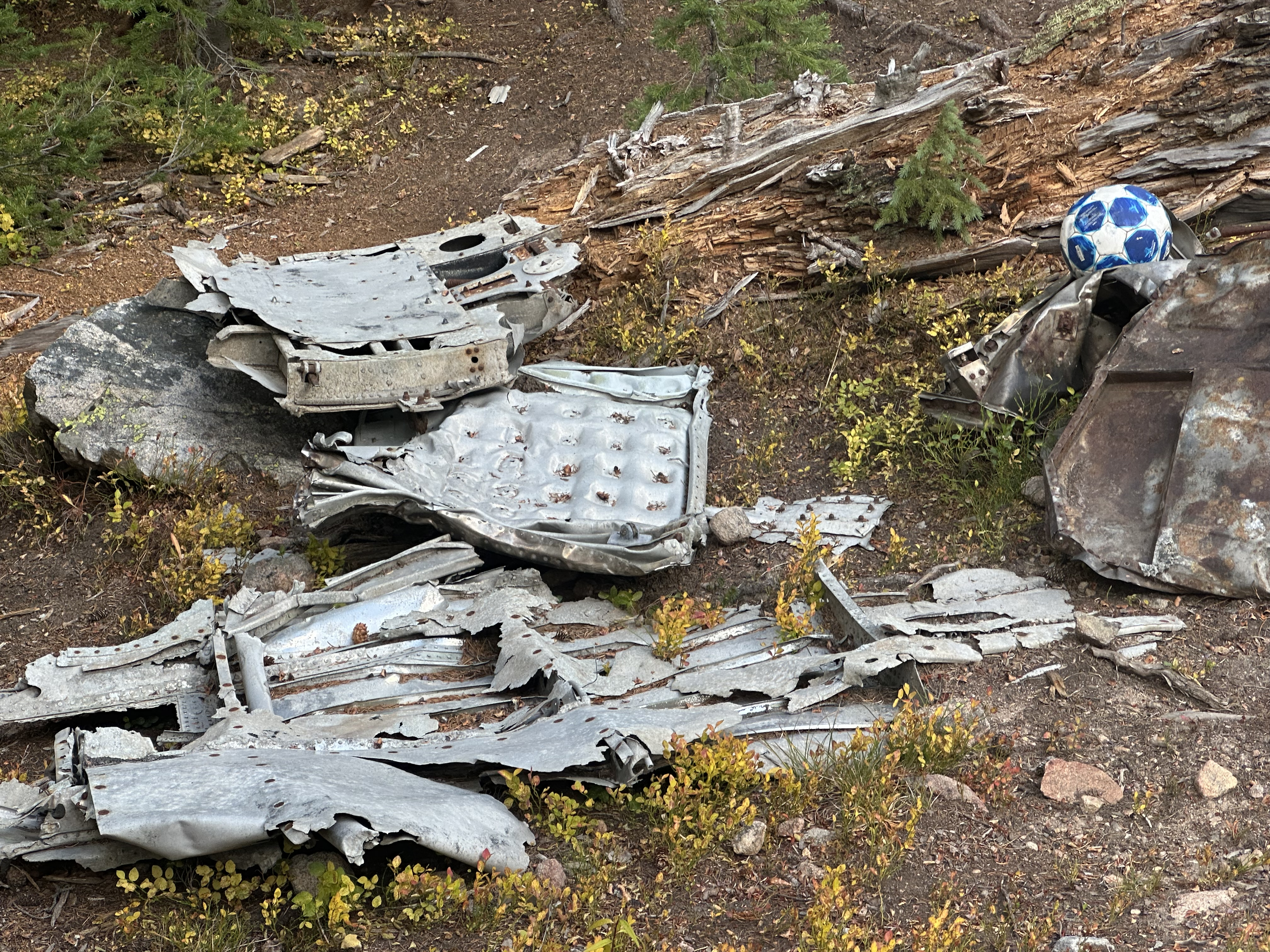
A collection of torn and twisted aircraft wreckage lies scattered on the ground, with a soccer ball placed near the debris.

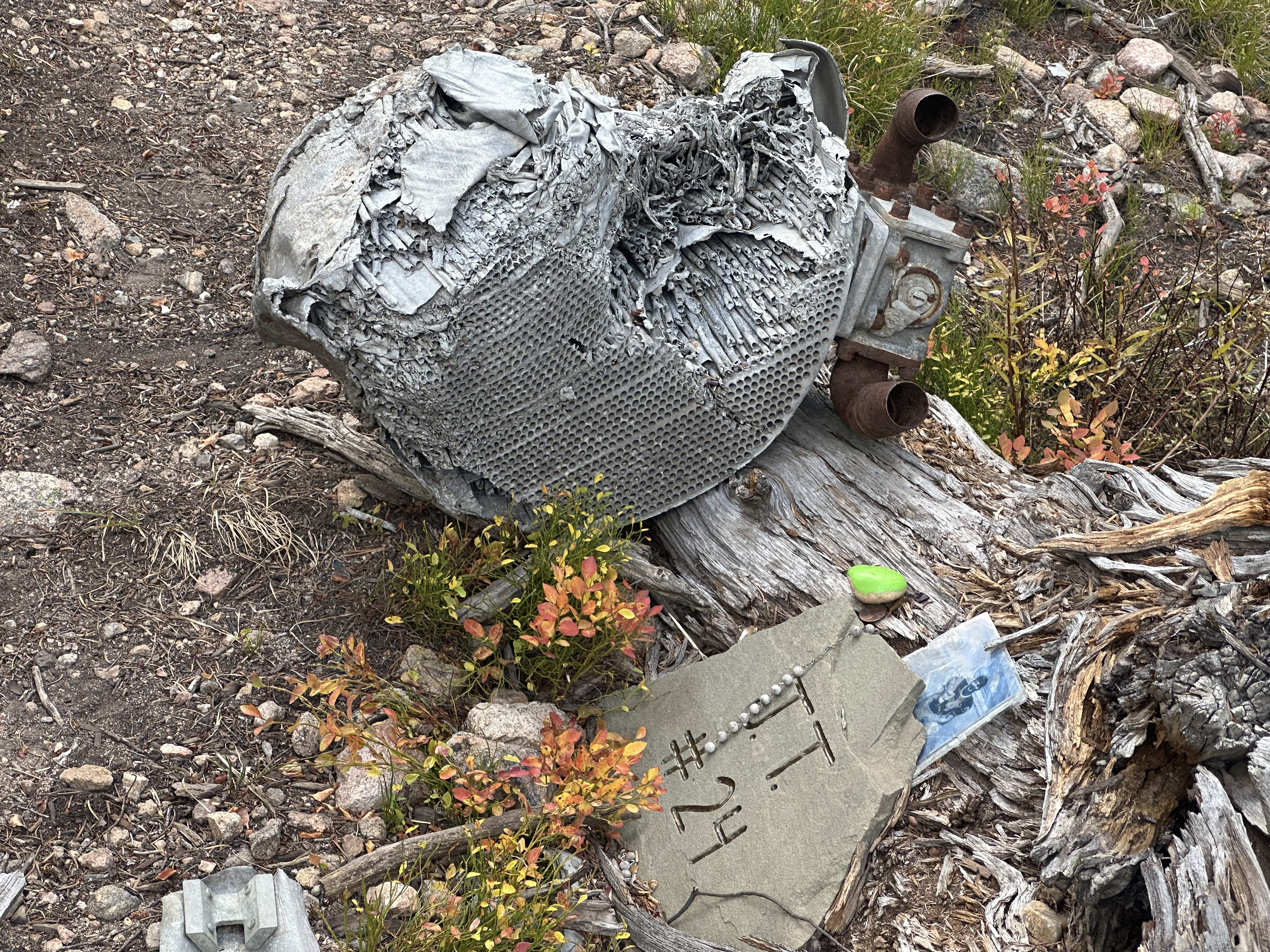
A mangled piece of aircraft wreckage lies on rocky ground, accompanied by a memorial stone and a small religious keepsake.

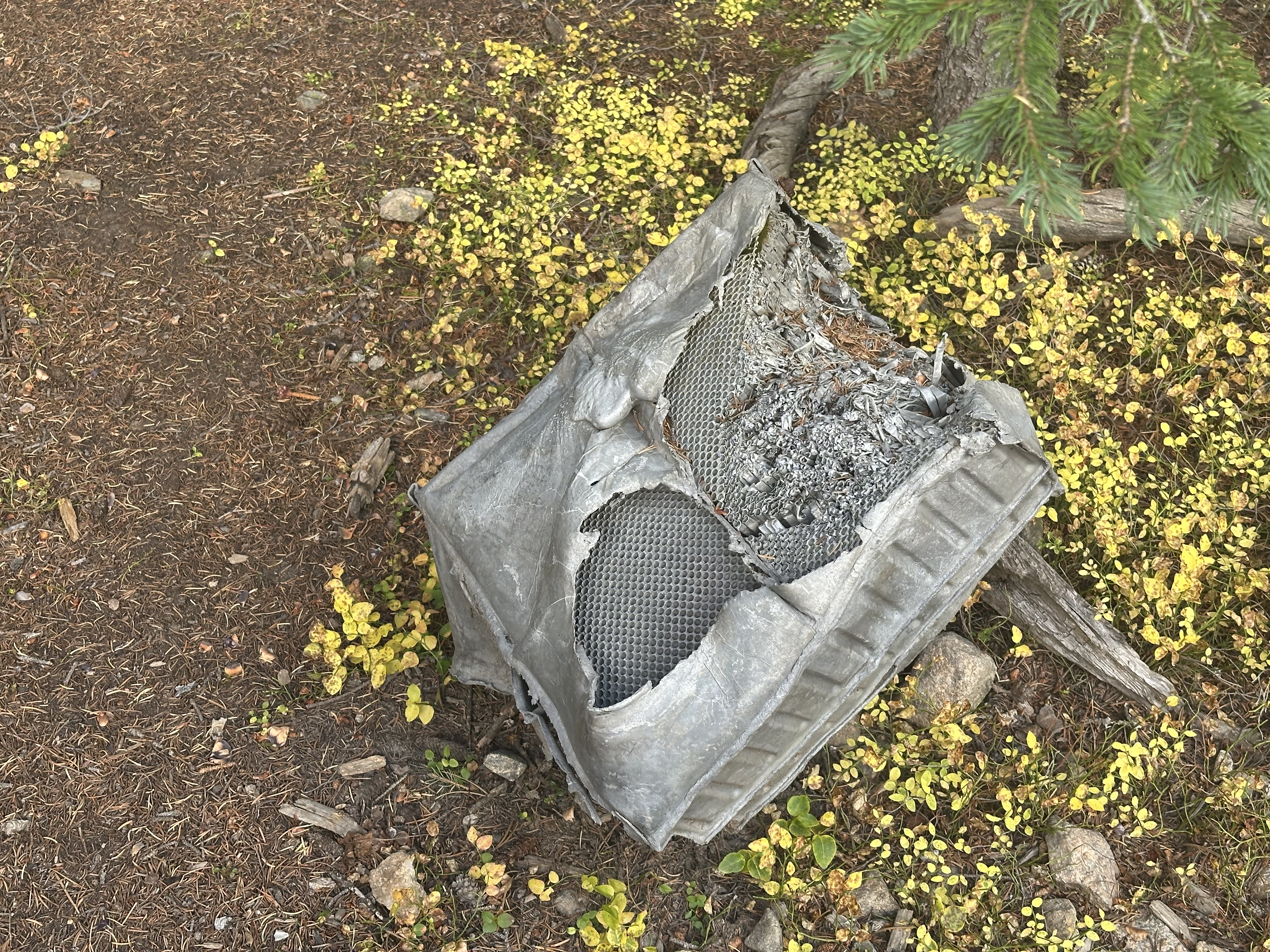
A partially melted and torn piece of debris, likely from the Wichita University football team plane crash, is lying on the ground surrounded by small yellow plants.

== See also ==
- Southern Airways Flight 932
- List of accidents involving sports teams
- Timeline of college football in Kansas
