= List of dual-threat quarterback records =

In gridiron football, the quarterback position is often defined by a player passing the football within the pocket. However, over the sport's history the position has evolved to feature quarterbacks with additional running ability. These quarterbacks are dubbed dual-threats for their potential to attack opposing defenses through the air or on the ground.

Dual-threat quarterbacks have historically been more prolific at the college level. In the National Football League (NFL), Cam Newton is the NFL's all-time leader in rushing attempts (1,118) and Josh Allen holds the record for most career rushing touchdowns (90) by a quarterback, while Lamar Jackson holds the record for most rushing yards (6,666). In the Canadian Football League (CFL), Damon Allen holds the rushing yards (11,920) and rushing touchdowns (93) record among quarterbacks.

== National Football League (NFL) ==
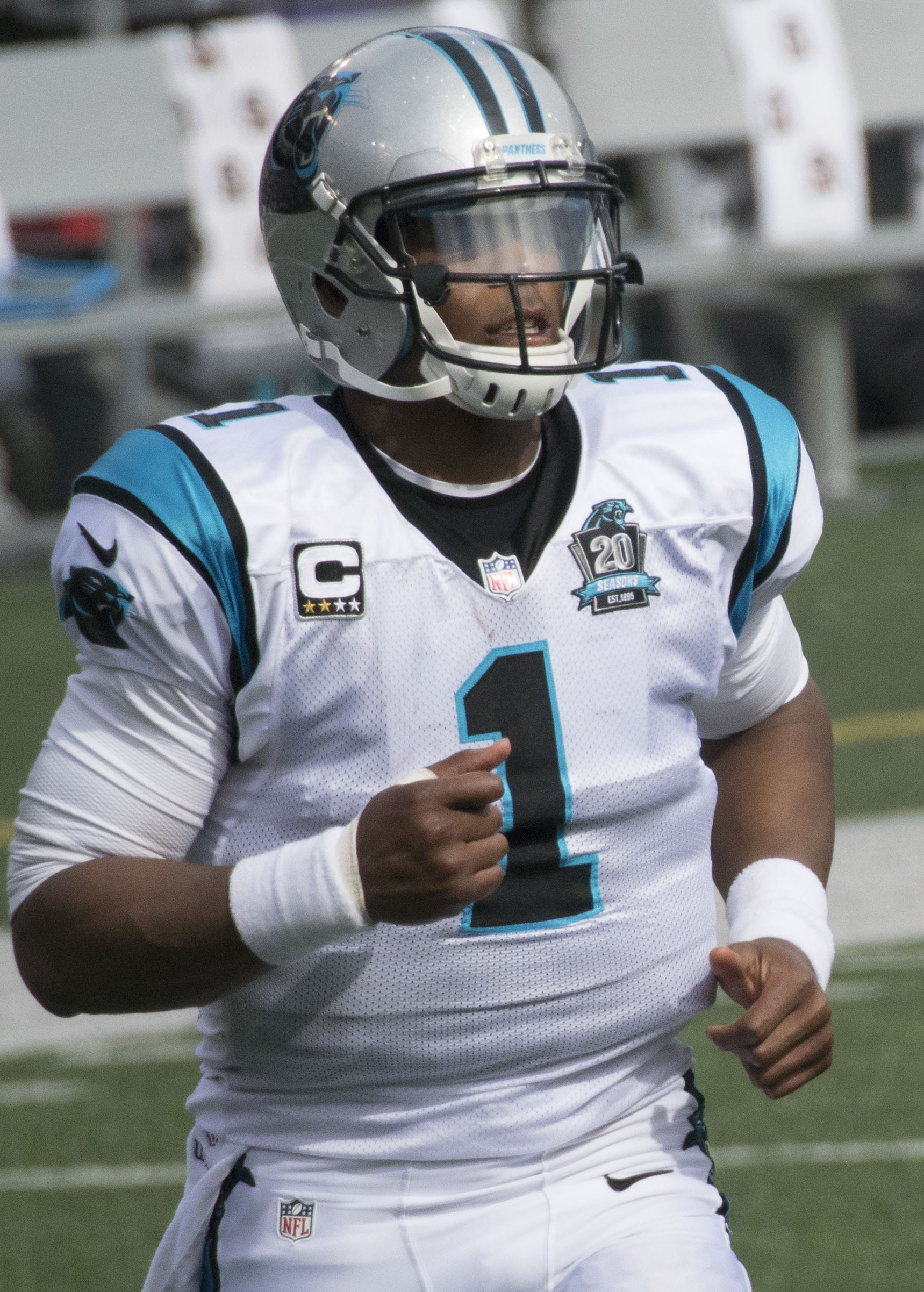
Cam Newton is the NFL's all-time leader in career rushing attempts by a quarterback

=== Career records ===
Note: stats are accurate as of Week 10 of 2026 season.

Key
Inducted into the Pro Football Hall of Fame
Player who is still active

==== Rushing attempts ====
Rank	Player	Teams	Rush attempts
1	Cam Newton	Carolina Panthers (2011–2019, 2021); New England Patriots (2020)	1,118
2	Lamar Jackson	Baltimore Ravens (2018–present)	1,100
3	Russell Wilson	Seattle Seahawks (2012–2021); Denver Broncos (2022–2023); Pittsburgh Steelers (2024); New York Giants (2025)	1,042
4	Josh Allen	Buffalo Bills (2018–present)	937
5	Michael Vick	Atlanta Falcons (2001–2006); Philadelphia Eagles (2009–2013); New York Jets (2014); Pittsburgh Steelers (2015)	873
6	Jalen Hurts	Philadelphia Eagles (2020–present)	802
7	Aaron Rodgers	Green Bay Packers (2005–2022); New York Jets (2023–2024); Pittsburgh Steelers (2025–present)	776
8	Randall Cunningham	Philadelphia Eagles (1985–1995); Minnesota Vikings (1997–1999); Dallas Cowboys (2000); Baltimore Ravens (2001)	775
9	John Elway	Denver Broncos (1983–1998)	774
10	Steve Young	Los Angeles Express (1984–1985); Tampa Bay Buccaneers (1985–1986); San Francisco 49ers (1987–1999)	722 (Note: Young's USFL stats with the Los Angeles Express are not counted.)
Source: (Note: Tom Matte and Charley Trippi have 1,200 and 687 rushing attempts, respectively, enough for placement within the top 10. However, they are not included in this listing as Matte was primarily used as a running back, having only attempted 42 passes in his career, while Trippi played in the pre-modern era of the NFL, in which players were more commonly versatile in terms of position. Trippi was also primarily used as a halfback rather than a quarterback, logging more rushing than passing attempts, and earning All-Pro honors as a running back.)

==== Rushing yards ====
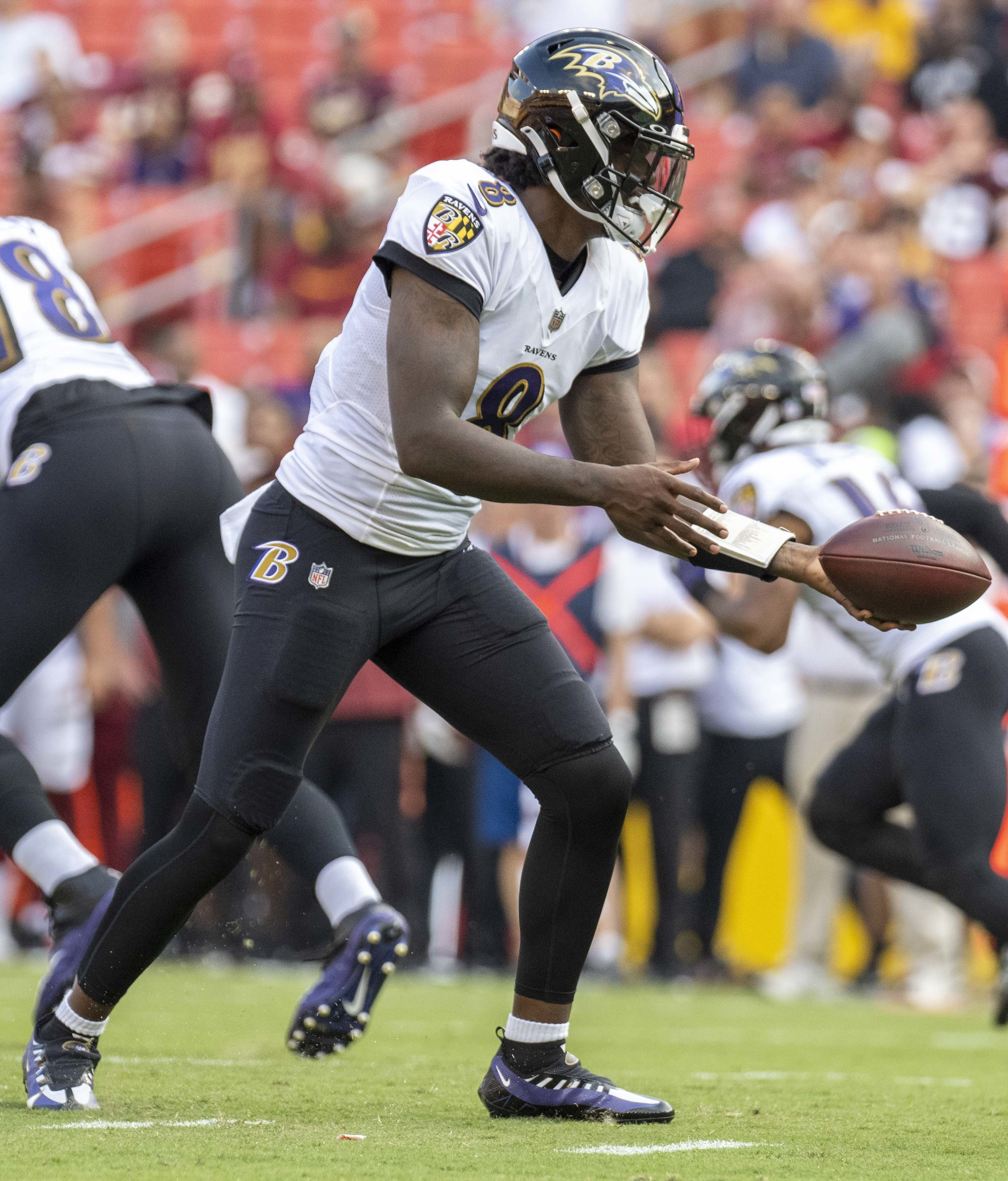
Lamar Jackson has the most career rushing yards among all quarterbacks

Rank	Player	Teams	Rushing yards
1	Lamar Jackson	Baltimore Ravens (2018–present)	6,666
2	Michael Vick	Atlanta Falcons (2001–2006); Philadelphia Eagles (2009–2013); New York Jets (2014); Pittsburgh Steelers (2015)	6,109
3	Cam Newton	Carolina Panthers (2011–2019, 2021); New England Patriots (2020)	5,628
4	Russell Wilson	Seattle Seahawks (2012–2021); Denver Broncos (2022–2023); Pittsburgh Steelers (2024); New York Giants (2025)	5,568
5	Josh Allen	Buffalo Bills (2018–present)	5,011
6	Randall Cunningham	Philadelphia Eagles (1985–1995); Minnesota Vikings (1997–1999); Dallas Cowboys (2000); Baltimore Ravens (2001)	4,928
7	Steve Young	Los Angeles Express (USFL) (1984–1985); Tampa Bay Buccaneers (1985–1986); San Francisco 49ers (1987–1999)	4,239
8	Fran Tarkenton	Minnesota Vikings (1961–1966); New York Giants (1967–1971); Minnesota Vikings (1972–1978)	3,674
9	Jalen Hurts	Philadelphia Eagles (2020–present)	3,661
10	Aaron Rodgers	Green Bay Packers (2005–2022); New York Jets (2023–2024); Pittsburgh Steelers (2025–present)	3,656
Source: (Note: Tom Matte and Charley Trippi have 4,646 and 3,506 rushing yards, respectively, enough for placement within the top 10. However, they are not included in this listing as Matte was primarily used as a running back, having only attempted 42 passes in his career, while Trippi played in the pre-modern era of the NFL, in which players were more commonly versatile in terms of position. Trippi was also primarily used as a halfback rather than a quarterback, logging more rushing than passing attempts, and earning All-Pro honors as a running back.)

==== Rushing touchdowns ====
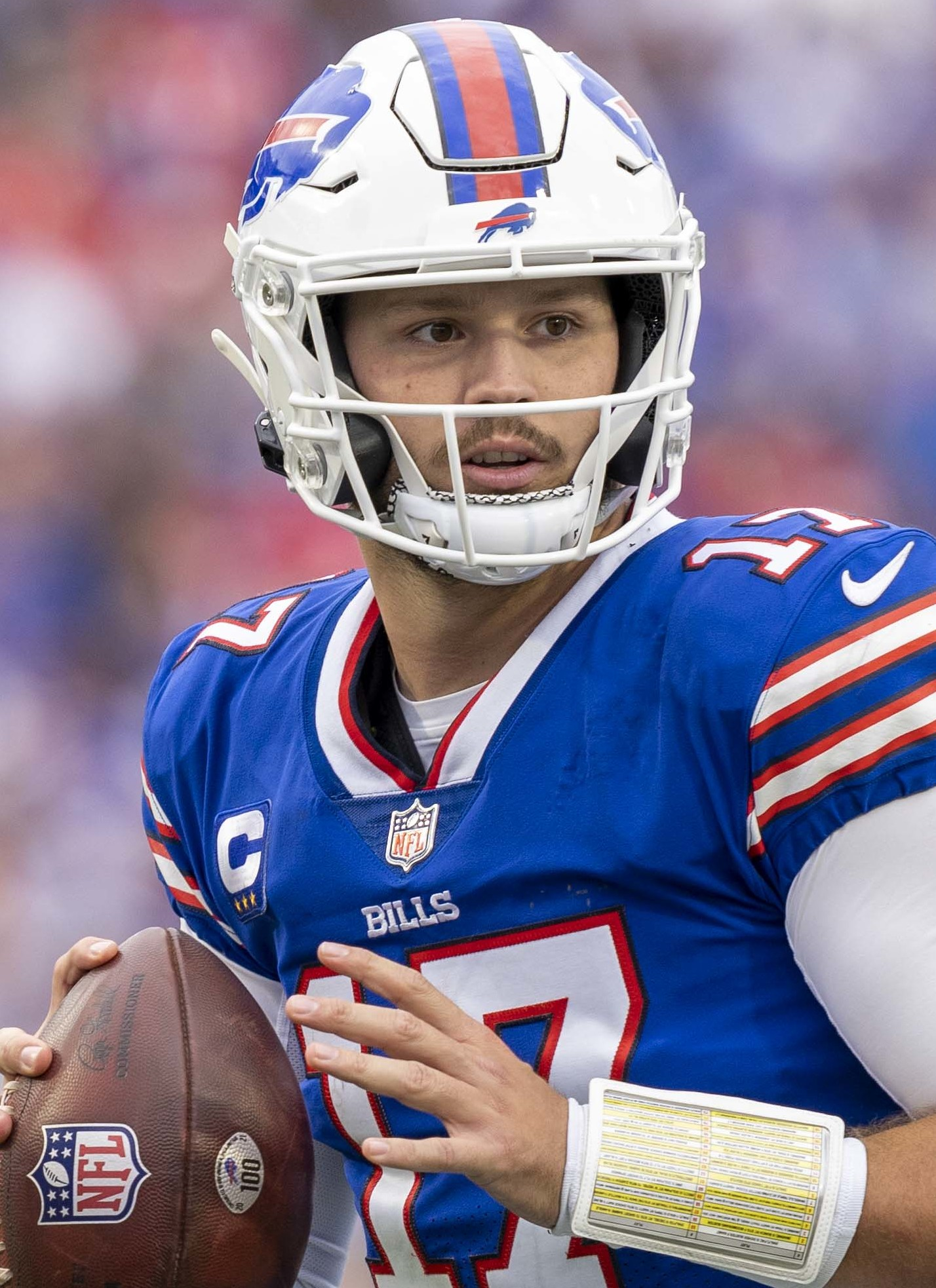
Josh Allen has the most career rushing touchdowns among all quarterbacks

Rank	Player	Teams	Rushing TDs
1	Josh Allen	Buffalo Bills (2018–present)	90
2	Cam Newton	Carolina Panthers (2011–2019, 2021); New England Patriots (2020)	75
3	Jalen Hurts	Philadelphia Eagles (2020–present)	64
4	Otto Graham	Cleveland Browns (1946–1955) (Note: Otto Graham played for the Cleveland Browns from 1946 through 1955. The Browns were a part of the All-America Football Conference (AAFC) from 1946 through 1949; despite the AAFC–NFL merger, the NFL did not officially count AAFC statistics and records until 2025, and Graham's 11 rushing touchdowns with the Browns pre-1950 is included for this list.)	44
5	Steve Young	Los Angeles Express (USFL) (1984–1985); Tampa Bay Buccaneers (1985–1986); San Francisco 49ers (1987–1999)	43
6	Jack Kemp	Pittsburgh Steelers (1957); Calgary Stampeders (CFL) (1959); L.A. / San Diego Chargers (1960–1962); Buffalo Bills (1962–1969)	40 (Note: Kemp's CFL statistics are not included in his official NFL stats)
7	Y. A. Tittle	Baltimore Colts (1948–1950); San Francisco 49ers (1951–1960); New York Giants (1961–1964)	39 (Note: Y.A. Tittle played for the original Baltimore Colts franchise from 1948 through 1950. The Colts were a part of the All-America Football Conference (AAFC) from 1947 through 1949; despite the AAFC–NFL merger, the NFL did not officially count AAFC statistics and records until 2025, and Tittle's 6 rushing touchdowns with the Colts pre-1950 is included for this list.)
8	Kordell Stewart	Pittsburgh Steelers (1995–2002); Chicago Bears (2003); Baltimore Ravens (2004–2005)	38
9 (tie)	Tobin Rote	Green Bay Packers (1950–1956); Detroit Lions (1957–1959); Toronto Argonauts (CFL) (1960–1962); San Diego Chargers (1963–1964); Denver Broncos (1966)	37 (Note: Rote's CFL statistics are not included in his official NFL stats)
9 (tie)	Steve McNair	Houston / Tennessee Oilers / Titans (1995–2005); Baltimore Ravens (2006–2007)	37
Source: (Note: Although Pro Football Reference lists Tom Matte with 45 touchdowns, Matte is not included in this listing as he was used primarily as a running back, only attempting 42 passes in his career.) (Note: Otto Graham and Y. A. Tittle recorded 44 and 39 rushing touchdowns, respectively, enough for a top 10 placement. However, they recorded several of their touchdowns during their time in the All-America Football Conference (AAFC), whose stats were not officially recognized by the NFL until 2025, despite the 1950 NFL–AAFC merger. From the 1950 NFL season onward, both Graham and Tittle recorded 33 rushing touchdowns each.)

=== Career playoffs leaders ===
Note: stats are accurate as of the end of the 2025–26 NFL playoffs.

Key
Inducted into the Pro Football Hall of Fame
Player who is still active

==== Rushing attempts ====
Rank	Player	Teams	Rush attempts
1	Josh Allen	Buffalo Bills (2018–present)	135
2	Tom Brady	New England Patriots (2000–2019); Tampa Bay Buccaneers (2020–2022)	114
3	Patrick Mahomes	Kansas City Chiefs (2017–present)	112
4	Steve Young	Los Angeles Express (USFL) (1984–1985); Tampa Bay Buccaneers (1985–1986); San Francisco 49ers (1987–1999)	96
5 (tied)	Lamar Jackson	Baltimore Ravens (2018–present)	94
5 (tied)	John Elway	Denver Broncos (1983–1998)	94
7	Russell Wilson	Seattle Seahawks (2012–2021); Denver Broncos (2022–2023); Pittsburgh Steelers (2024); New York Giants (2025)	86
8	Jalen Hurts	Philadelphia Eagles (2020–present)	83
9 (tied)	Ben Roethlisberger	Pittsburgh Steelers (2004–2021)	76
9 (tied)	Roger Staubach	Dallas Cowboys (1969–1979)	76

==== Rushing yards ====
Rank	Player	Teams	Rush yards
1	Josh Allen	Buffalo Bills (2018–present)	767
2	Lamar Jackson	Baltimore Ravens (2018–present)	641
3	Patrick Mahomes	Kansas City Chiefs (2017–present)	606
4	Steve Young	Los Angeles Express (USFL) (1984–1985); Tampa Bay Buccaneers (1985–1986); San Francisco 49ers (1987–1999)	594
5	Russell Wilson	Seattle Seahawks (2012–2021); Denver Broncos (2022–2023); Pittsburgh Steelers (2024); New York Giants (2025)	533
6	Colin Kaepernick	San Francisco 49ers (2011–2016)	507
7	John Elway	Denver Broncos (1983–1998)	461
8	Roger Staubach	Dallas Cowboys (1969–1979)	432
9	Donovan McNabb	Philadelphia Eagles (1999–2009); Washington Redskins (2010); Minnesota Vikings (2011)	422
10	Jalen Hurts	Philadelphia Eagles (2020–present)	395

==== Rushing touchdowns ====
Rank	Player	Teams	Rush TDs
1	Jalen Hurts	Philadelphia Eagles (2020–present)	10
2	Josh Allen	Buffalo Bills (2018–present)	9
3	Steve Young	Los Angeles Express (USFL) (1984–1985); Tampa Bay Buccaneers (1985–1986); San Francisco 49ers (1987–1999)	8
4 (tie)	Patrick Mahomes	Kansas City Chiefs (2017–present)	7
4 (tie)	Tom Brady	New England Patriots (2000–2019); Tampa Bay Buccaneers (2020–2022)	7
6 (tie)	Steve McNair	Houston Oilers (1995–1996); Tennessee Oilers (1997–1998); Tennessee Titans (1999–2005); Baltimore Ravens (2006–2007)	6
6 (tie)	John Elway	Denver Broncos (1983–1998)	6
6 (tie)	Otto Graham	Cleveland Browns (1946–1955) (Note: Otto Graham played for the Cleveland Browns from 1946 through 1955. The Browns were a part of the All-America Football Conference (AAFC) from 1946 through 1949; despite the AAFC–NFL merger, the NFL did not officially count AAFC statistics and records until 2025, and Graham's one rushing touchdown with the Browns pre-1950 is included for this list.)	6
9	Dak Prescott	Dallas Cowboys (2016–present)	4
9	Colin Kaepernick	San Francisco 49ers (2011–2016)	4
9	Aaron Rodgers	Green Bay Packers (2005–2022); New York Jets (2023– 2024); Pittsburgh Steelers (2025-present)	4
9	Donovan McNabb	Philadelphia Eagles (1999–2009); Washington Redskins (2010); Minnesota Vikings (2011)	4

=== Single-season ===
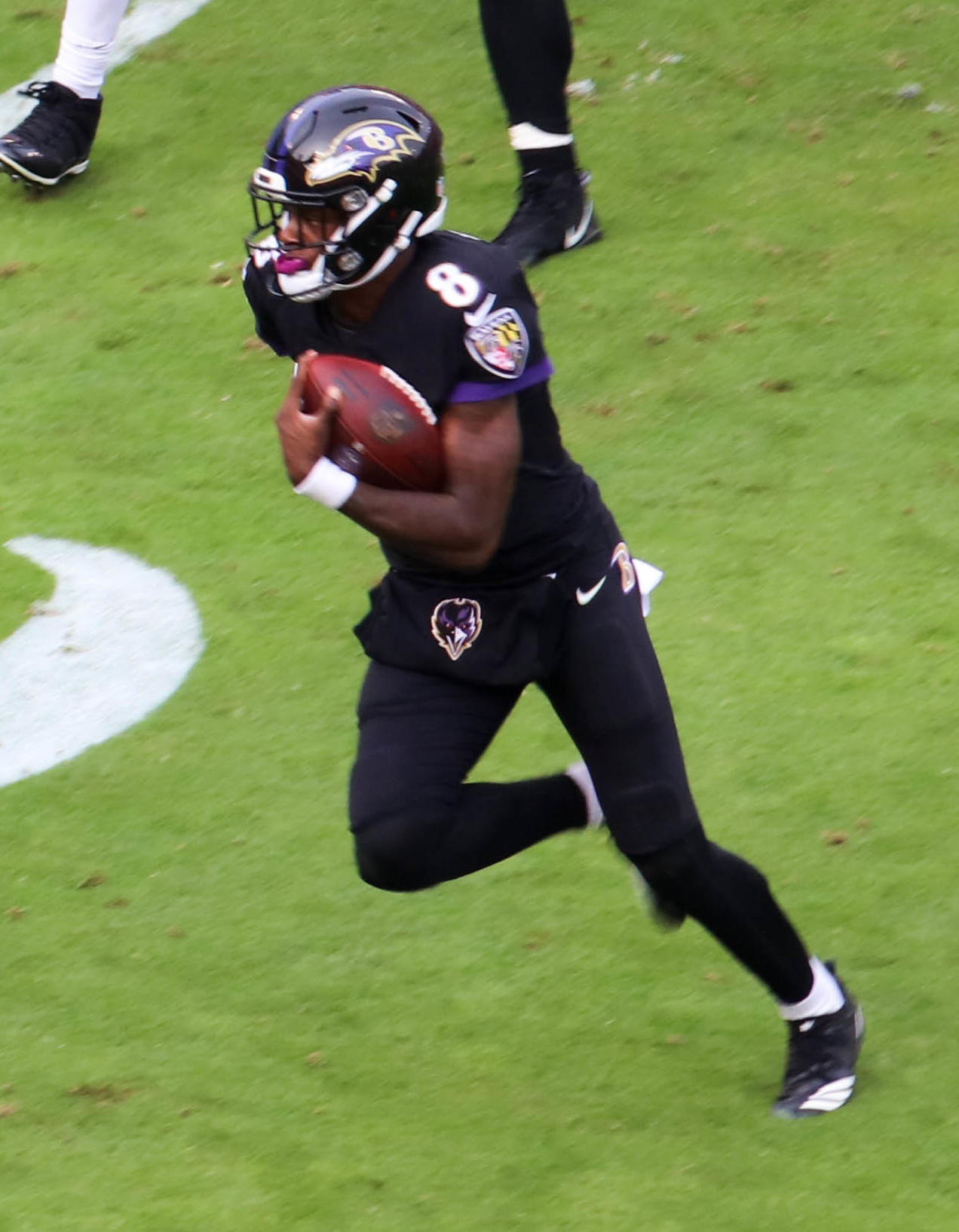
Lamar Jackson has four of the top eight NFL seasons in rushing attempts and two of the top four in rushing yards

Key	Player	Denotes an ongoing season

==== Rushing attempts ====
Rank	Player	Season	Team	Rush attempts
1	Lamar Jackson	2019	Baltimore Ravens	176
2	Jalen Hurts	2022	Philadelphia Eagles	165
3	Justin Fields	2022	Chicago Bears	160
4	Lamar Jackson	2020	Baltimore Ravens	159
5	Jalen Hurts	2023	Philadelphia Eagles	157
6	Jalen Hurts	2024	Philadelphia Eagles	150
7 (tied)	Lamar Jackson	2023	Baltimore Ravens	148
7 (tied)	Jayden Daniels	2024	Washington Commanders	148
9	Lamar Jackson	2018	Baltimore Ravens	147
10	Bobby Douglass	1972	Chicago Bears	141

==== Rushing yards ====
Rank	Player	Season	Team	Rushing yards
1	Lamar Jackson	2019	Baltimore Ravens	1,206
2	Justin Fields	2022	Chicago Bears	1,143
3	Michael Vick	2006	Atlanta Falcons	1,039
4	Lamar Jackson	2020	Baltimore Ravens	1,005
5	Bobby Douglass	1972	Chicago Bears	968
6	Randall Cunningham	1990	Philadelphia Eagles	942
7	Lamar Jackson	2024	Baltimore Ravens	915
8	Michael Vick	2004	Atlanta Falcons	902
9	Jayden Daniels	2024	Washington Commanders	891
10	Russell Wilson	2014	Seattle Seahawks	849

==== Rushing yards per game ====
Rank	Player	Season	Team	RYds/game
1	Lamar Jackson	2019	Baltimore Ravens	80.4
2	Justin Fields	2022	Chicago Bears	76.2
3	Bobby Douglass	1972	Chicago Bears	69.1
4	Lamar Jackson	2020	Baltimore Ravens	67.0
5	Michael Vick	2006	Atlanta Falcons	64.9
6	Lamar Jackson	2021	Baltimore Ravens	63.9
7	Lamar Jackson	2022	Baltimore Ravens	63.7
8	Michael Vick	2004	Atlanta Falcons	60.1
9	Randall Cunningham	1990	Philadelphia Eagles	58.9
10	Michael Vick	2010	Philadelphia Eagles	56.3

==== Rushing touchdowns ====
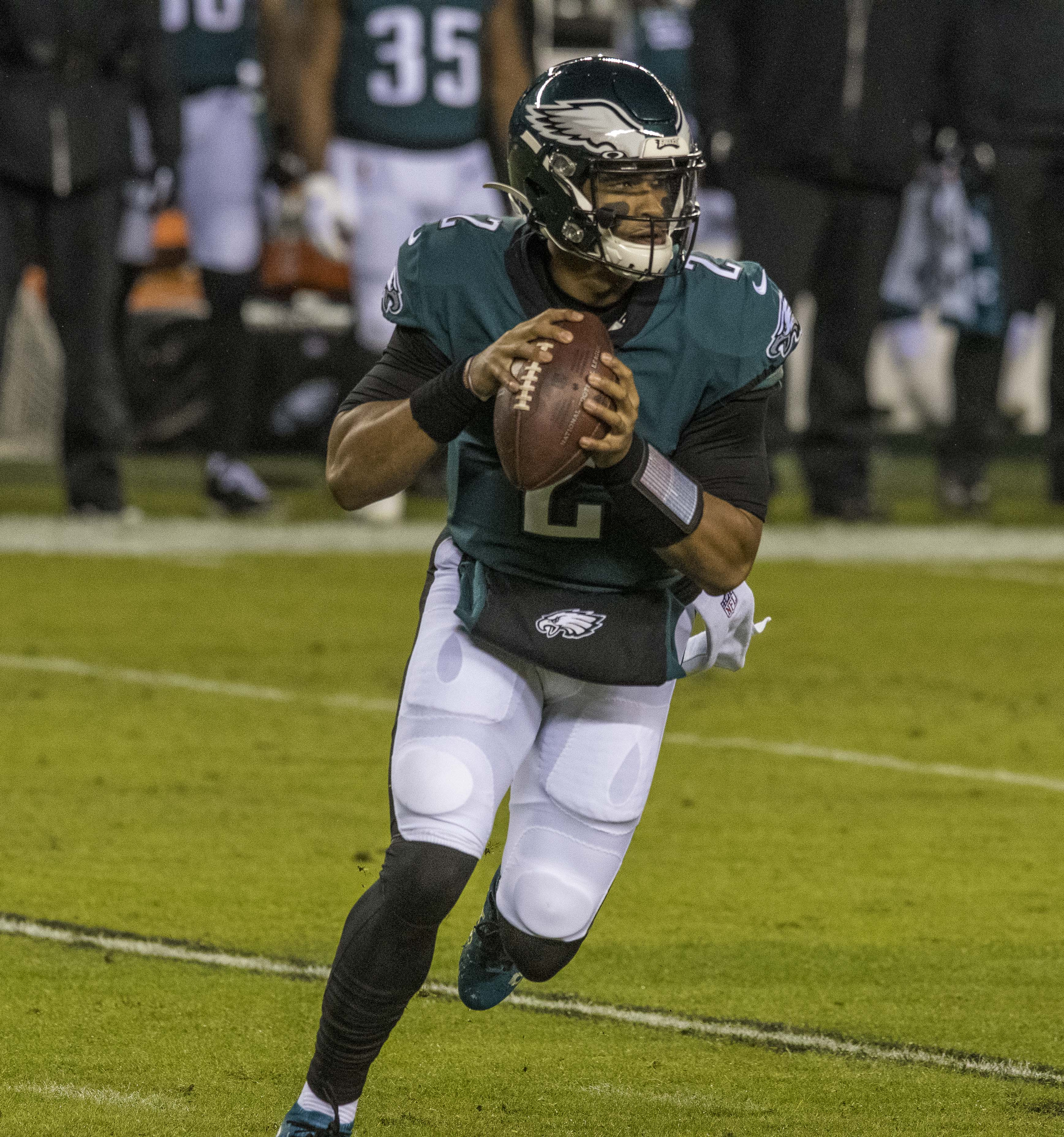
Jalen Hurts (pictured) and Josh Allen's 2023 performances are tied for first all-time in rushing touchdowns

Rank	Player	Season	Team	Rushing TDs
1 (tie)	Jalen Hurts	2023	Philadelphia Eagles	15
1 (tie)	Josh Allen	2023	Buffalo Bills	15
3 (tie)	Cam Newton	2011	Carolina Panthers	14
3 (tie)	Jalen Hurts	2024	Philadelphia Eagles	14
3 (tie)	Josh Allen	2025	Buffalo Bills	14
5	Jalen Hurts	2022	Philadelphia Eagles	13
6 (tie)	Steve Grogan	1976	New England Patriots	12
6 (tie)	Cam Newton	2020	New England Patriots	12
6 (tie)	Josh Allen	2024	Buffalo Bills	12
9 (tie)	Johnny Lujack	1950	Chicago Bears	11
9 (tie)	Tobin Rote	1956	Green Bay Packers	11
9 (tie)	Kordell Stewart	1997	Pittsburgh Steelers	11
9 (tie)	Kyler Murray	2020	Arizona Cardinals	11
9 (tie)	Josh Allen	2026	Buffalo Bills	11

=== Single-game ===
==== Rushing attempts ====
Rank	Player	Date	Team	Opponent	Att	Yds	Avg	TD	Ref.
1	Lamar Jackson	November 18, 2018	Baltimore Ravens	Cincinnati Bengals	26	119	4.6	0	
2	Tim Tebow	November 27, 2011	Denver Broncos	San Diego Chargers	22	67	3.0	0	
3	Lamar Jackson	November 7, 2021	Baltimore Ravens	Minnesota Vikings	21	120	5.7	0	
4 (tie)	Billy Kilmer	October 15, 1961	San Francisco 49ers	Minnesota Vikings	20	115	5.8	4	
4 (tie)	Lamar Jackson	December 30, 2018	Baltimore Ravens	Cleveland Browns	20	90	4.5	2	
5	Lamar Jackson	October 19, 2019	Baltimore Ravens	Cincinnati Bengals	19	152	8.0	1	

==== Rushing yards ====
Rank	Player	Date	Team	Opponent	Att	Yds	Avg	TD	Ref.
1	Justin Fields	November 6, 2022	Chicago Bears	Miami Dolphins	15	178	11.9	1	
2	Mike Vick	December 1, 2002	Atlanta Falcons	Minnesota Vikings	10	173	17.3	2	
3	Mike Vick	November 26, 2006	Atlanta Falcons	New Orleans Saints	12	166	13.8	0	
4	Jalen Hurts	November 27, 2022	Philadelphia Eagles	Green Bay Packers	17	157	9.2	0	
5	Lamar Jackson	October 19, 2019	Baltimore Ravens	Cincinnati Bengals	19	152	8.0	1	

==== Rushing touchdowns ====
Rank	Player	Date	Team	Opponent	Att	Yds	Avg	TD	Ref.
1 (tie)	Billy Kilmer	October 15, 1961	San Francisco 49ers	Minnesota Vikings	20	115	5.8	4	
1 (tie)	Bobby Douglass	November 4, 1973	Chicago Bears	Green Bay Packers	19	100	5.3	4	
3 (tie)	A total of 21 quarterbacks have recorded three rushing touchdowns in a game, most recently Josh Allen. Jalen Hurts holds the record for the most career games with three rushing touchdowns.								

== Canadian Football League (CFL) ==
The CFL's field dimensions, measuring 65 yards wide and 110 yards long, provide quarterbacks with more open space to run compared to other forms of football. Mobility and improvisation have therefore become valuable traits for quarterbacks in Canadian football. Additionally, the one-yard distance between the offensive and defensive lines contributes to the frequent use of quarterbacks in short-yardage and goal-line situations. Quarterback sneaks and other short-yardage plays have allowed quarterbacks to accumulate significant rushing totals, particularly in rushing touchdowns. Since 2014, quarterbacks used in short-yardage roles have frequently appeared among the CFL's rushing leaders, alongside traditional dual-threat quarterbacks.

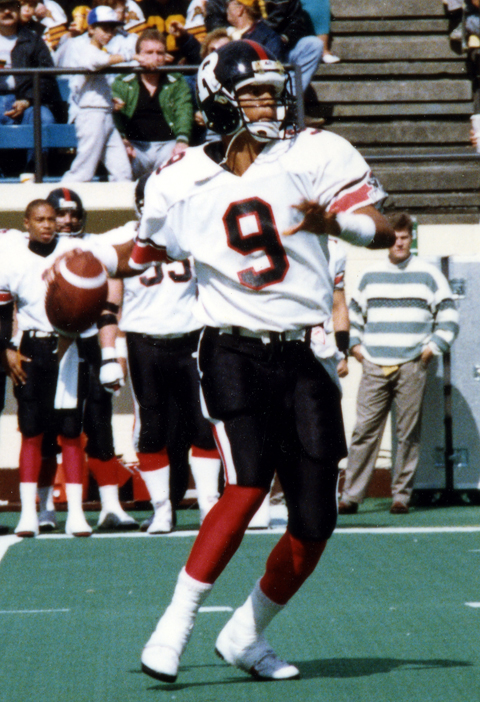
Damon Allen is the CFL's all-time leader in both rushing yards and rushing touchdowns for a quarterback.

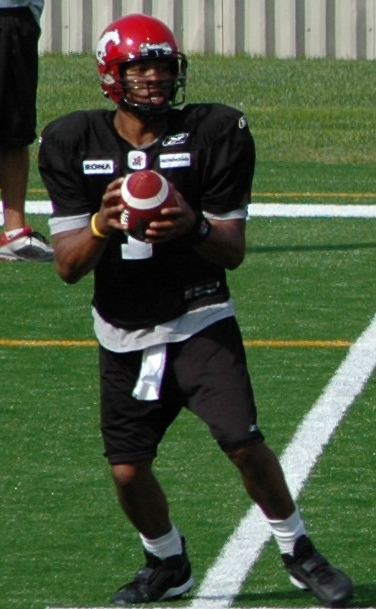
Henry Burris accumulated 5,653 career rushing yards and 68 rushing touchdowns during his CFL career.

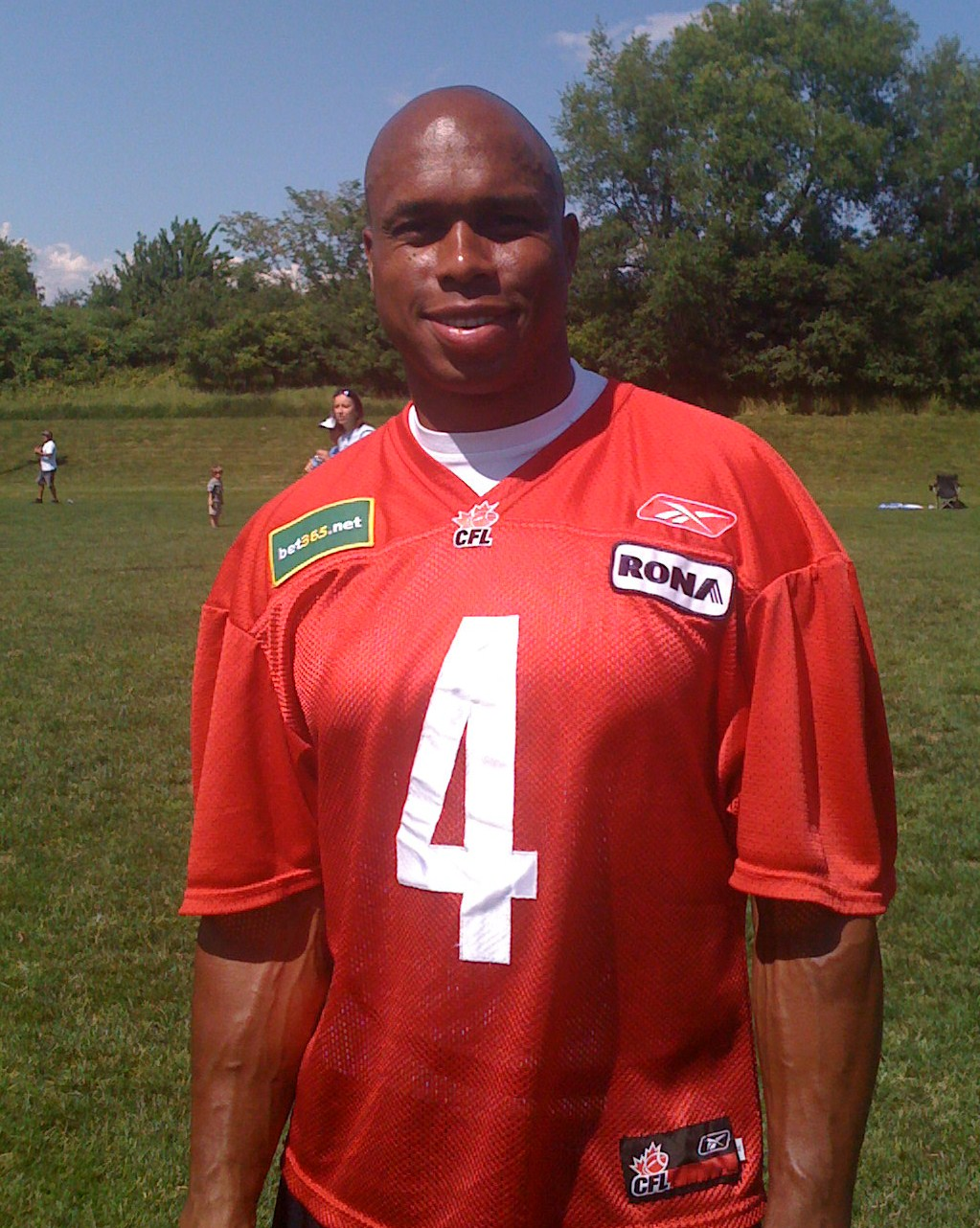
Kerry Joseph rushed for 1,006 yards during the 2005 CFL season.

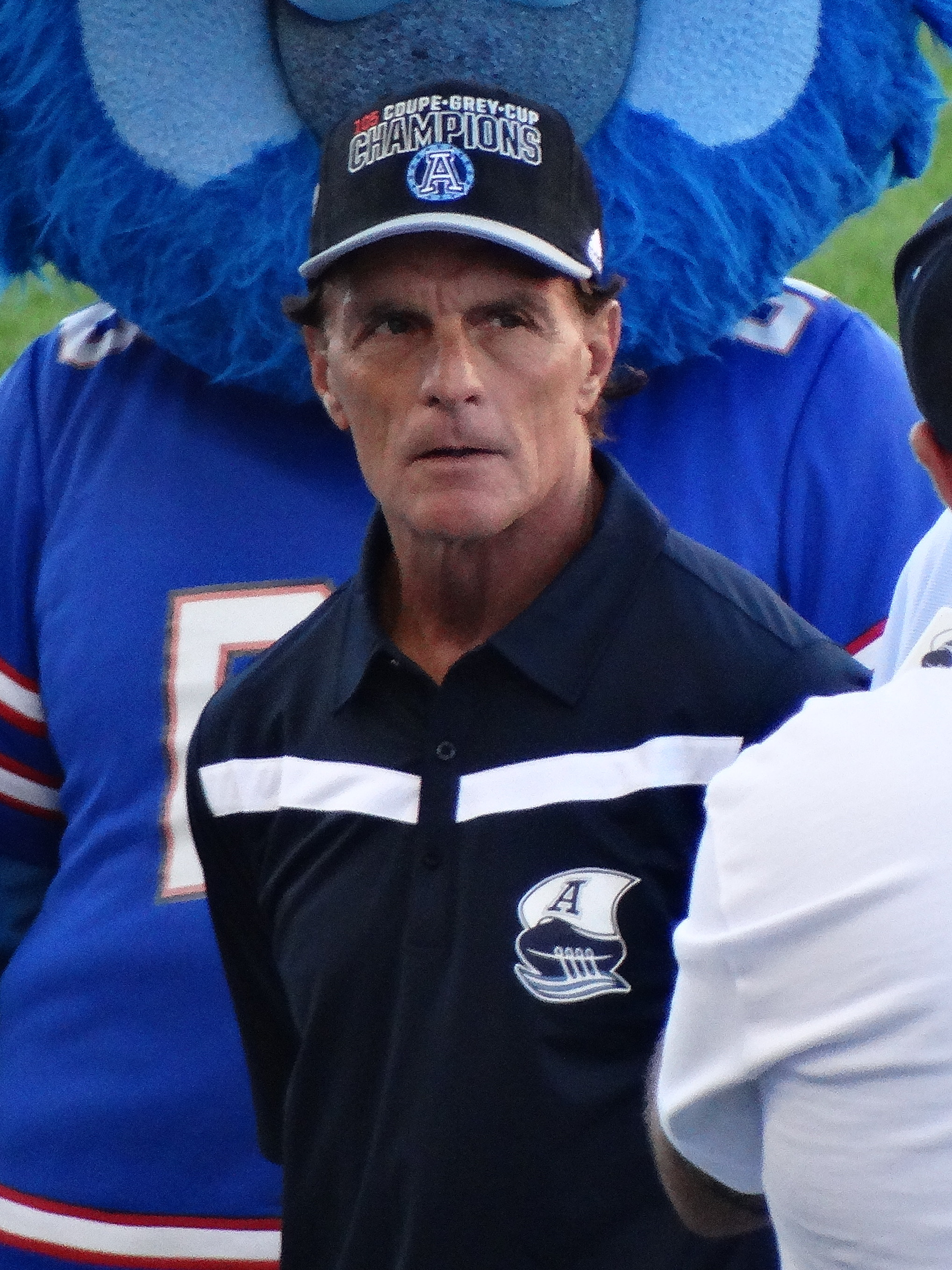
Doug Flutie rushed for 4,660 yards and 66 touchdowns during his CFL career.

=== Career records ===
Key
Inducted into the Canadian Football Hall of Fame
Player who is still active

Current through the 2026 CFL season.

==== Rushing attempts ====
Rank	Player	Team(s) by season	Att
1	Damon Allen	Edmonton Eskimos (1985–1988); Ottawa Rough Riders (1989–1991); Hamilton Tiger-Cats (1992); Edmonton Eskimos (1993–1994); Memphis Mad Dogs (1995); BC Lions (1996–2002); Toronto Argonauts (2003–2007)	1,766
2	Tracy Ham	Edmonton Eskimos (1987–1992); Toronto Argonauts (1993); Baltimore Stallions (1994–1995); Montreal Alouettes (1996–1999)	1,059
3	Henry Burris	Calgary Stampeders (1997–1999; 2005–2011); Saskatchewan Roughriders (2000; 2003–2004); Hamilton Tiger-Cats (2012–2013); Ottawa Redblacks (2014–2016)	963
4	Matt Dunigan	Edmonton Eskimos (1983–1987); BC Lions (1988–1989); Toronto Argonauts (1990–1991); Winnipeg Blue Bombers (1992–1994); Birmingham Barracudas (1995); Hamilton Tiger-Cats (1996)	850
5	Jackie Parker	Edmonton Eskimos (1954–1962); Toronto Argonauts (1963–1965); BC Lions (1968)	834
6	Russ Jackson	Ottawa Rough Riders (1958–1969)	726
7	Doug Flutie	BC Lions (1990–1991); Calgary Stampeders (1992–1995); Toronto Argonauts (1996–1997)	704
8	Kerry Joseph	Ottawa Renegades (2003–2005); Saskatchewan Roughriders (2006–2007; 2014); Toronto Argonauts (2008–2013); Edmonton Eskimos (2010–2013)	697
9	Bernie Faloney	Edmonton Eskimos (1954); Hamilton Tiger-Cats (1957–1964); Montreal Alouettes (1965–1966); BC Lions (1967)	694

==== Rushing yards ====
Rank	Player	Team(s) by season	Yards
1	Damon Allen	Edmonton Eskimos (1985–1988); Ottawa Rough Riders (1989–1991); Hamilton Tiger-Cats (1992); Edmonton Eskimos (1993–1994); Memphis Mad Dogs (1995); BC Lions (1996–2002); Toronto Argonauts (2003–2007)	11,920
2	Tracy Ham	Edmonton Eskimos (1987–1992); Toronto Argonauts (1993); Baltimore Stallions (1994–1995); Montreal Alouettes (1996–1999)	8,043
3	Henry Burris	Calgary Stampeders (1997–1999; 2005–2011); Saskatchewan Roughriders (2000; 2003–2004); Hamilton Tiger-Cats (2012–2013); Ottawa Redblacks (2014–2016)	5,653
4	Jackie Parker	Edmonton Eskimos (1954–1962); Toronto Argonauts (1963–1965); BC Lions (1968)	5,327
5	Russ Jackson	Ottawa Rough Riders (1958–1969)	5,122
6	Matt Dunigan	Edmonton Eskimos (1983–1987); BC Lions (1988–1989); Toronto Argonauts (1990–1991); Winnipeg Blue Bombers (1992–1994); Birmingham Barracudas (1995); Hamilton Tiger-Cats (1996)	5,031
7	Doug Flutie	BC Lions (1990–1991); Calgary Stampeders (1992–1995); Toronto Argonauts (1996–1997)	4,660
8	Kerry Joseph	Ottawa Renegades (2003–2005); Saskatchewan Roughriders (2006–2007; 2014); Toronto Argonauts (2008–2013); Edmonton Eskimos (2010–2013)	4,584
9	Chuck Ealey	Hamilton Tiger-Cats (1972–1974); Winnipeg Blue Bombers (1974–1975); Toronto Argonauts (1975–1978)	3,984

==== Rushing touchdowns ====
Rank	Player	Team(s) by season	TD	Ref.
1	Damon Allen	Edmonton Eskimos (1985–1988); Ottawa Rough Riders (1989–1991); Hamilton Tiger-Cats (1992); Edmonton Eskimos (1993–1994); Memphis Mad Dogs (1995); BC Lions (1996–2002); Toronto Argonauts (2003–2007)	93	
2	Matt Dunigan	Edmonton Eskimos (1983–1987); BC Lions (1988–1989); Toronto Argonauts (1990–1991); Winnipeg Blue Bombers (1992–1994); Birmingham Barracudas (1995); Hamilton Tiger-Cats (1996)	77	
3	Henry Burris	Calgary Stampeders (1997–1999; 2005–2011); Saskatchewan Roughriders (2000; 2003–2004); Hamilton Tiger-Cats (2012–2013); Ottawa Redblacks (2014–2016)	68	
4	Jackie Parker	Edmonton Eskimos (1954–1962); Toronto Argonauts (1963–1965); BC Lions (1968)	67	
5	Doug Flutie	BC Lions (1990–1991); Calgary Stampeders (1992–1995); Toronto Argonauts (1996–1997)	66	

=== Single-season records ===
==== Rushing yards ====
Rank	Player	Season	Team	Yards
1	Tracy Ham	1990	Edmonton Eskimos	1,096
2	Damon Allen	1991	Ottawa Rough Riders	1,036
3	Kerry Joseph	2005	Ottawa Renegades	1,006
4	Tracy Ham	1989	Edmonton Eskimos	1,005
5	Tracy Ham	1991	Edmonton Eskimos	998
6	Ken Hobart	1985	Hamilton Tiger-Cats	928
7	Damon Allen	1993	Edmonton Eskimos	920
8	Nealon Greene	1999	Edmonton Eskimos	928
9	Damon Allen	1992	Hamilton Tiger-Cats	850

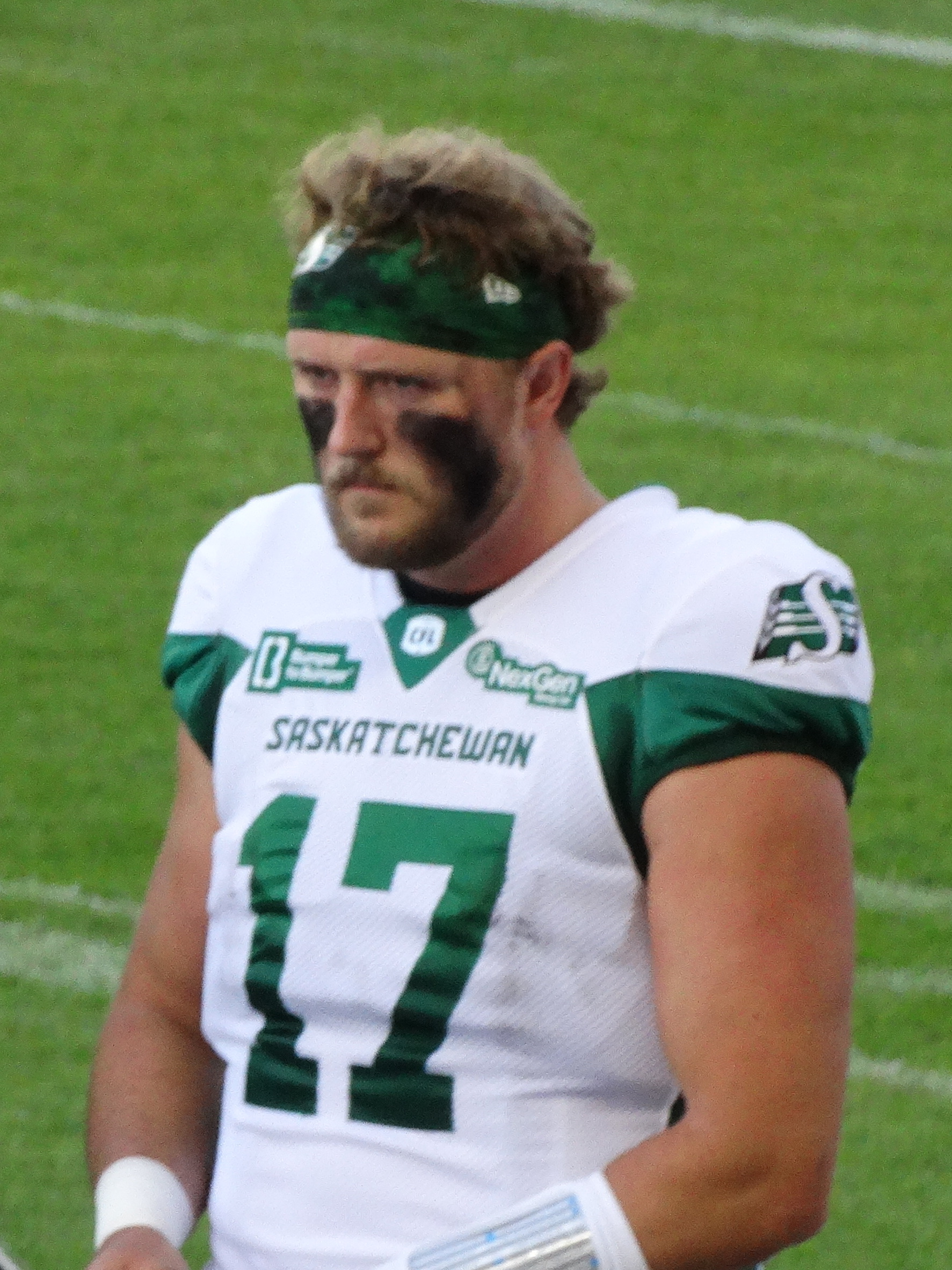
Tommy Stevens, the CFL single-season leader in rushing touchdowns by a quarterback (17).

==== Rushing touchdowns ====
Rank	Player	Season	Team	TD
1	Tommy Stevens	2026	Saskatchewan Roughriders	17
2	Caleb Evans	2022	Ottawa Redblacks	16
3 (tie)	Doug Flutie	1991	BC Lions	14
3 (tie)	James Franklin	2018	Toronto Argonauts	14
3 (tie)	Quincy Vaughn	2026	Calgary Stampeders	14

=== Single-game records ===
==== Rushing yards ====
Rank	Player	Date	Team	Opponent	Att	Yds	Avg	Ref.
1	Nealon Greene	July 16, 1999	Edmonton Eskimos	Saskatchewan Roughriders	14	180	12.9	
2	Damon Allen	October 29, 1993	Edmonton Eskimos	BC Lions	15	170	11.3	
3	Ken Ploen	August 28, 1958	Winnipeg Blue Bombers	BC Lions	10	168	16.8	
4	Tracy Ham	August 15, 1991	Edmonton Eskimos	Ottawa Rough Riders	13	166	12.8	
5	Tommy Stevens	October 29, 2022	Calgary Stampeders	Saskatchewan Roughriders	4	163	40.8	

== National Collegiate Athletic Association (FBS) ==
Career totals for college quarterbacks listed on this page generally reflect official NCAA recorded statistics, which, per NCAA policy, do not include bowl game statistics for seasons prior to 2002. Bowl game stats began to count toward single-season and career totals starting with the 2002 season, and this change was not applied retroactively to earlier careers. As a result, many prolific dual-threat quarterbacks from earlier eras — including Heisman Trophy winner Eric Crouch, whose official NCAA career totals omit his bowl performances — may appear lower on all-time statistical lists than they would if those bowl games were included. Bowl game performances prior to 2002 are documented separately but are not part of the NCAA’s official career statistical totals used for the records on this page.

=== Career records ===
Note: stats are accurate as of the 2025 NCAA Division I FBS football season regular season.

Key
Inducted into the College Football Hall of Fame
Player who is still active

==== Rushing yards ====
Rank	Player	Seasons by team	Yards
1	Keenan Reynolds	Navy (2012–2015)	4,559
2	Denard Robinson	Michigan (2009–2012)	4,495
3	Pat White	West Virginia (2005–2008)	4,480
4	Malcolm Perry	Navy (2016–2019)	4,359
5	Jordan Lynch	Northern Illinois (2010–2013)	4,343
6	Brad Smith	Missouri (2002–2005)	4,289
7	Lamar Jackson	Louisville (2015–2017)	4,132
8	Colin Kaepernick	Nevada (2007–2010)	4,112
9	Antwaan Randle El	Indiana (1998–2001)	3,895
10	Quinton Flowers	South Florida (2014–2017)	3,672

==== Rushing touchdowns ====
Rank	Player	Seasons by team	TD
1	Keenan Reynolds	Navy (2012–2015)	88
2 (tie)	Eric Crouch	Nebraska (1998–2001)	59
2 (tie)	Colin Kaepernick	Nevada (2007–2010)	59
4	Tim Tebow	Florida (2006–2009)	57
5	Collin Klein	Kansas State (2009–2012)	56
6 (tie)	Lamar Jackson	Louisville (2015–2017)	50
6 (tie)	Malik Cunningham	Louisville (2018–2022)	50
8 (tie)	Kareem Wilson	Ohio (1995–1998)	49
8 (tie)	Ricky Dobbs	Navy (2008–2010)	49
8 (tie)	Nathan Rourke	Ohio (2017–2019)	49

=== Single-season records ===
==== Rushing yards ====
Rank	Player	Season	Team	Yards
1	Malcolm Perry	2019	Navy	2,017
2	Jordan Lynch	2013	Northern Illinois	1,920
3	Jordan Lynch	2012	Northern Illinois	1,815
4	Ahmad Bradshaw	2017	Army	1,746
5	Denard Robinson	2010	Michigan	1,702

==== Rushing touchdowns ====
Rank	Player	Season	Team	TD
1	Bryson Daily	2024	Army	32
2	Keenan Reynolds	2013	Navy	31
3 (tie)	Ricky Dobbs	2009	Navy	27
3 (tie)	Collin Klein	2011	Kansas State	27
5	Will Worth	2016	Navy	25

=== Single-game ===
==== Rushing yards ====
Rank	Player	Date	Team	Opponent	Att	Yds	Avg	TD	Ref.
1	Khalil Tate	October 7, 2017	Arizona	Colorado	14	327	23.4	4	
2	Jordan Lynch	November 26, 2013	Northern Illinois	Western Michigan	27	321	11.9	3	
3	Jordan Lynch	October 19, 2013	Northern Illinois	Central Michigan	32	316	9.9	3	
4	Malcolm Perry	December 14, 2019	Navy	Army	29	304	10.5	2	
5	Bert Emanuel Jr.	November 9, 2022	Central Michigan	Buffalo	24	293	12.2	3	

==== Rushing touchdowns ====
Rank	Player	Date	Team	Opponent	Att	Yds	Avg	TD	Ref.
1	Keenan Reynolds	November 22, 2013	Navy	San Jose State	36	240	6.7	7	
2 (tie)	Craig Candeto	December 7, 2002	Navy	Army	18	103	5.7	6	
2 (tie)	Keenan Reynolds	November 15, 2014	Navy	Georgia Southern	30	277	9.2	6	
