= List of college football seasons =

A list of college football seasons from the first season in 1869 until the NCAA's single division split into Division I, Division II, and Division III in 1973 and then Division I split again into Division I-A and Division I-AA in 1978. Founded as the Intercollegiate Athletic Association of the United States in 1906, the NCAA adopted its current name in 1910. Also included are teams from the National Association of Intercollegiate Athletics, which has held its own football championship since 1956.

== Pre-regulation (1869–1905) ==
| Year | Conference champions | National champion |
|---|---|---|
| 1869 | | Princeton; Rutgers |
| 1870 | | Princeton |
| 1871 | No games played | |
| 1872 | | Princeton; Yale |
| 1873 | | Princeton |
| 1874 | | Harvard; Princeton; Yale |
| 1875 | | Columbia; Harvard; Princeton |
| 1876 | | Yale |
| 1877 | | Princeton; Yale |
| 1878 | | Princeton |
| 1879 | | Princeton; Yale |
| 1880 | | Princeton; Yale |
| 1881 | | Princeton; Yale |
| 1882 | | Yale |
| 1883 | | Yale |
| 1884 | | Princeton; Yale |
| 1885 | | Princeton |
| 1886 | | Princeton; Yale |
| 1887 | | Yale |
| 1888 | | Yale |
| 1889 | | Princeton |
| 1890 | | Harvard |
| 1891 | | Yale |
| 1892 | | Yale |
| 1893 | | Princeton; Yale |
| 1894 | | Penn; Princeton; Yale |
| 1895 | | Penn; Yale |
| 1896 | Western Conference – Wisconsin | Lafayette; Princeton |
| 1897 | Western Conference – Wisconsin | Penn; Yale |
| 1898 | Western Conference – Michigan | Harvard; Princeton |
| 1899 | Big Nine Conference – Chicago | Harvard; Princeton |
| 1900 | Big Nine Conference – Iowa and Minnesota; Colorado Football Association – Colorado College | Yale |
| 1901 | Big Nine Conference – Michigan and Wisconsin; Colorado Football Association – Colorado | Harvard; Michigan; Yale |
| 1902 | Big Nine Conference – Michigan; Colorado Football Association – Colorado | Michigan; Yale |
| 1903 | Big Nine Conference – Michigan, Minnesota, and Wisconsin; Colorado Football Association – Colorado | Michigan; Princeton |
| 1904 | Big Nine Conference – Michigan and Minnesota; Colorado Football Association – Colorado Mines | Michigan; Minnesota; Penn |
| 1905 | Big Nine Conference – Chicago | Chicago; Yale |

== NCAA (1906–present) ==
=== Single division (1906–1961) ===
| Year | Conference champions | National champion | Heisman Trophy |
|---|---|---|---|
| 1906 | Big Nine Conference – Wisconsin, Minnesota, and Michigan; Colorado Football Association – Colorado Mines; Michigan Intercollegiate Athletic Association – Olivet; Southern Intercollegiate Athletic Association – Vanderbilt | Princeton; Vanderbilt; Yale | — |
| 1907 | Big Nine Conference – Chicago; Colorado Football Association – Colorado Mines; Michigan Intercollegiate Athletic Association – Olivet; Missouri Valley Intercollegiate Athletic Association – Iowa and Nebraska; Southern Intercollegiate Athletic Association – Vanderbilt | Penn; Yale | — |
| 1908 | Big Nine Conference – Chicago; Colorado Football Association – Denver; Michigan Intercollegiate Athletic Association – Albion; Missouri Valley Intercollegiate Athletic Association – Kansas; Southern Intercollegiate Athletic Association – LSU, Auburn | Harvard; LSU; Penn | — |
| 1909 | Big Nine Conference – Minnesota; Michigan Intercollegiate Athletic Association – Olivet; Missouri Valley Intercollegiate Athletic Association – Missouri; Rocky Mountain Conference – Denver; Southern Intercollegiate Athletic Association – Sewanee | Yale | — |
| 1910 | Big Nine Conference – Illinois and Minnesota; Michigan Intercollegiate Athletic Association –; Missouri Valley Intercollegiate Athletic Association – Nebraska; Rocky Mountain Conference – Colorado; Southern Intercollegiate Athletic Association – Auburn and Vanderbilt | Auburn; Harvard; Michigan; Pittsburgh | — |
| 1911 | Big Nine Conference – Minnesota; Michigan Intercollegiate Athletic Association –; Missouri Valley Intercollegiate Athletic Association –; Rocky Mountain Conference – Colorado; Southern Intercollegiate Athletic Association – Vanderbilt | Minnesota; Penn State; Princeton; Vanderbilt | — |
| 1912 | Big Nine Conference – Wisconsin; Central Intercollegiate Athletic Association –; Michigan Intercollegiate Athletic Association –; Missouri Valley Intercollegiate Athletic Association –; Rocky Mountain Conference – Colorado Mines; Southern Intercollegiate Athletic Association – Vanderbilt | Harvard; Penn State; Wisconsin | — |
| 1913 | Big Nine Conference – Chicago; Central Intercollegiate Athletic Association –; Michigan Intercollegiate Athletic Association –; Missouri Valley Intercollegiate Athletic Association –; Rocky Mountain Conference – Colorado; Southern Intercollegiate Athletic Association – Auburn; Wisconsin Intercollegiate Athletic Conference – | Auburn; Chicago; Harvard | — |
| 1914 | Big Nine Conference – Illinois; Central Intercollegiate Athletic Association –; Michigan Intercollegiate Athletic Association –; Missouri Valley Intercollegiate Athletic Association –; Rocky Mountain Conference – Colorado Mines; Southern Intercollegiate Athletic Association – Auburn and Tennessee; Southwest Conference –; Wisconsin Intercollegiate Athletic Conference – | Army; Auburn; Illinois; Texas | — |
| 1915 | Big Nine Conference – Minnesota and Illinois; Central Intercollegiate Athletic Association –; Michigan Intercollegiate Athletic Association –; Missouri Valley Intercollegiate Athletic Association –; Rocky Mountain Conference – Colorado A&M; Southern Intercollegiate Athletic Association – Vanderbilt; Southwest Conference –; Wisconsin Intercollegiate Athletic Conference – | Cornell; Minnesota; Nebraska; Oklahoma; Pittsburgh | — |
| 1916 | Big Nine Conference – Ohio State; Central Intercollegiate Athletic Association –; Michigan Intercollegiate Athletic Association –; Missouri Valley Intercollegiate Athletic Association –; Pacific Coast Conference –; Rocky Mountain Conference – Colorado A&M; Southern Intercollegiate Athletic Association – Georgia Tech and Tennessee; Southwest Conference –; Wisconsin Intercollegiate Athletic Conference – | Army; Georgia Tech; Pittsburgh | — |
| 1917 | Big Ten Conference – Ohio State; Central Intercollegiate Athletic Association –; Michigan Intercollegiate Athletic Association –; Missouri Valley Intercollegiate Athletic Association –; Pacific Coast Conference –; Rocky Mountain Conference – Denver; Southern Intercollegiate Athletic Association – Georgia Tech; Southwest Conference –; Wisconsin Intercollegiate Athletic Conference – | Georgia Tech | — |
| 1918 | Big Ten Conference – Illinois, Michigan, and Purdue; Central Intercollegiate Athletic Association –; Michigan Intercollegiate Athletic Association –; Missouri Valley Intercollegiate Athletic Association –; Pacific Coast Conference –; Rocky Mountain Conference – Colorado Mines; Southern Intercollegiate Athletic Association – Georgia Tech; Southwest Conference –; Wisconsin Intercollegiate Athletic Conference – | Michigan; Pittsburgh | — |
| 1919 | Big Ten Conference – Illinois; Central Intercollegiate Athletic Association –; Michigan Intercollegiate Athletic Association –; Missouri Valley Intercollegiate Athletic Association –; Pacific Coast Conference –; Rocky Mountain Conference – Colorado A&M; Southern Intercollegiate Athletic Association – Auburn and Centre; Southwest Conference –; Wisconsin Intercollegiate Athletic Conference – | Centre; Harvard; Illinois; Notre Dame; Texas A&M | — |
| 1920 | Big Ten Conference – Ohio State; Central Intercollegiate Athletic Association –; Michigan Intercollegiate Athletic Association –; Missouri Valley Intercollegiate Athletic Association –; Minnesota Intercollegiate Athletic Conference –; Pacific Coast Conference –; Rocky Mountain Conference – Colorado A&M; Southern Intercollegiate Athletic Association – Georgia, Georgia Tech, Tulane; Southwest Conference –; Wisconsin Intercollegiate Athletic Conference – | California; Georgia; Harvard; Notre Dame; Princeton | — |
| 1921 | Big Ten Conference – Iowa; Central Intercollegiate Athletic Association –; Michigan Intercollegiate Athletic Association –; Missouri Valley Intercollegiate Athletic Association –; Minnesota Intercollegiate Athletic Conference –; Pacific Coast Conference –; Rocky Mountain Conference – Utah A.C.; Southern California Intercollegiate Athletic Conference –; Southern Intercollegiate Athletic Association – Centre, Georgia, Georgia Tech, Vanderbilt; Southwest Conference –; Southwestern Athletic Conference –; Wisconsin Intercollegiate Athletic Conference – | California; Cornell; Iowa; Lafayette; Washington & Jefferson | — |
| 1922 | Big Ten Conference – Iowa and Michigan; Central Intercollegiate Athletic Association –; Michigan Intercollegiate Athletic Association –; Midwest Collegiate Athletic Conference –; Missouri Valley Intercollegiate Athletic Association –; Minnesota Intercollegiate Athletic Conference –; North Central Conference –; Pacific Coast Conference –; Rocky Mountain Conference – Utah; Southern California Intercollegiate Athletic Conference –; Southern Conference – Vanderbilt, Georgia Tech, North Carolina; Southern Intercollegiate Athletic Conference –; Southwest Conference –; Southwestern Athletic Conference –; Wisconsin Intercollegiate Athletic Conference – | California; Cornell; Iowa; Princeton; Vanderbilt | — |
| 1923 | Big Ten Conference – Illinois and Michigan; Central Intercollegiate Athletic Association –; Iowa Intercollegiate Athletic Conference –; Michigan Intercollegiate Athletic Association –; Midwest Collegiate Athletic Conference –; Missouri Valley Intercollegiate Athletic Association –; Minnesota Intercollegiate Athletic Conference –; North Central Conference –; Pacific Coast Conference –; Rocky Mountain Conference – Colorado; Southern California Intercollegiate Athletic Conference –; Southern Conference – Vanderbilt and Washington and Lee; Southern Intercollegiate Athletic Conference –; Southwest Conference –; Southwestern Athletic Conference –; Wisconsin Intercollegiate Athletic Conference – | California; Cornell; Illinois; Michigan; Yale | — |
| 1924 | Big Ten Conference – Chicago; Central Intercollegiate Athletic Association –; Iowa Intercollegiate Athletic Conference –; Michigan Intercollegiate Athletic Association –; Midwest Collegiate Athletic Conference –; Missouri Intercollegiate Athletic Association –; Missouri Valley Intercollegiate Athletic Association –; Minnesota Intercollegiate Athletic Conference –; North Central Conference –; Pacific Coast Conference –; Rocky Mountain Conference – Colorado; Southern California Intercollegiate Athletic Conference –; Southern Conference – Alabama; Southern Intercollegiate Athletic Conference –; Southwest Conference –; Southwestern Athletic Conference –; Wisconsin Intercollegiate Athletic Conference – | Notre Dame; Penn | — |
| 1925 | Big Ten Conference – Michigan; Central Intercollegiate Athletic Association –; Far Western Football Conference –; Iowa Intercollegiate Athletic Conference –; Michigan Intercollegiate Athletic Association –; Midwest Collegiate Athletic Conference –; Missouri Intercollegiate Athletic Association –; Missouri Valley Intercollegiate Athletic Association –; Minnesota Intercollegiate Athletic Conference –; North Central Conference –; Pacific Coast Conference –; Rocky Mountain Conference – Colorado A&M; Southern California Intercollegiate Athletic Conference –; Southern Conference –; Southern Intercollegiate Athletic Conference – Alabama and Tulane; Southwest Conference –; Southwestern Athletic Conference –; Wisconsin Intercollegiate Athletic Conference – | Alabama; Dartmouth; Michigan | — |
| 1926 | Big Ten Conference – Michigan and Northwestern; Central Intercollegiate Athletic Association –; Far Western Football Conference –; Iowa Intercollegiate Athletic Conference –; Michigan Intercollegiate Athletic Association –; Midwest Collegiate Athletic Conference –; Missouri Intercollegiate Athletic Association –; Missouri Valley Intercollegiate Athletic Association –; Minnesota Intercollegiate Athletic Conference –; North Central Conference –; Northwest Conference –; Pacific Coast Conference –; Rocky Mountain Conference – Utah; Southern California Intercollegiate Athletic Conference –; Southern Conference – Alabama; Southern Intercollegiate Athletic Conference –; Southwest Conference –; Southwestern Athletic Conference –; Wisconsin Intercollegiate Athletic Conference – | Alabama; Lafayette; Michigan; Navy; Stanford | — |
| 1927 | Big Ten Conference – Illinois; Central Intercollegiate Athletic Association –; Far Western Football Conference –; Iowa Intercollegiate Athletic Conference –; Michigan Intercollegiate Athletic Association –; Midwest Collegiate Athletic Conference –; Missouri Intercollegiate Athletic Association –; Missouri Valley Intercollegiate Athletic Association –; Minnesota Intercollegiate Athletic Conference –; North Central Conference –; Northwest Conference –; Pacific Coast Conference –; Rocky Mountain Conference – Colorado A&M; Southern California Intercollegiate Athletic Conference –; Southern Conference – Georgia Tech, NC State, and Tennessee; Southern Intercollegiate Athletic Conference –; Southwest Conference –; Southwestern Athletic Conference –; Wisconsin Intercollegiate Athletic Conference – | Georgia; Illinois; Notre Dame; Texas A&M; Yale | — |
| 1928 | Big Ten Conference – Illinois; Big Six Conference –; Central Intercollegiate Athletic Association –; Far Western Football Conference –; Iowa Intercollegiate Athletic Conference –; Michigan Intercollegiate Athletic Association –; Midwest Collegiate Athletic Conference –; Missouri Intercollegiate Athletic Association –; Missouri Valley Conference –; Minnesota Intercollegiate Athletic Conference –; North Central Conference –; Northwest Conference –; Pacific Coast Conference –; Rocky Mountain Conference – Utah; Southern California Intercollegiate Athletic Conference –; Southern Conference – Georgia Tech; Southern Intercollegiate Athletic Conference –; Southwest Conference –; Southwestern Athletic Conference –; Wisconsin Intercollegiate Athletic Conference – | Detroit; Georgia Tech; USC | — |
| 1929 | Big Ten Conference – Purdue; Big Six Conference –; Central Intercollegiate Athletic Association –; Far Western Football Conference –; Iowa Intercollegiate Athletic Conference –; Michigan Intercollegiate Athletic Association –; Midwest Collegiate Athletic Conference –; Missouri Intercollegiate Athletic Association –; Missouri Valley Conference –; Minnesota Intercollegiate Athletic Conference –; North Central Conference –; Northwest Conference –; Pacific Coast Conference –; Rocky Mountain Conference – Utah; Southern California Intercollegiate Athletic Conference –; Southern Conference –; Southern Intercollegiate Athletic Conference –; Southwest Conference –; Southwestern Athletic Conference –; Wisconsin Intercollegiate Athletic Conference – | Notre Dame; Pittsburgh; USC | — |
| 1930 | Big Ten Conference – Michigan and Northwestern; Big Six Conference –; Central Intercollegiate Athletic Association –; Far Western Football Conference –; Iowa Intercollegiate Athletic Conference –; Michigan Intercollegiate Athletic Association –; Midwest Collegiate Athletic Conference –; Missouri Intercollegiate Athletic Association –; Missouri Valley Conference –; Minnesota Intercollegiate Athletic Conference –; North Central Conference –; Northwest Conference –; Pacific Coast Conference –; Rocky Mountain Conference – Utah; Southern California Intercollegiate Athletic Conference –; Southern Conference –; Southern Intercollegiate Athletic Conference –; Southwest Conference –; Southwestern Athletic Conference –; Wisconsin Intercollegiate Athletic Conference – | Alabama; Notre Dame | — |
| 1931 | Big Ten Conference – Purdue, Michigan, and Northwestern; Big Six Conference – Nebraska; Border Intercollegiate Athletic Association – Arizona State; Central Intercollegiate Athletic Association – Hampton Institute; Far Western Football Conference –; Iowa Intercollegiate Athletic Conference – Simpson; Michigan Intercollegiate Athletic Association – Hillsdale; Midwest Collegiate Athletic Conference – Carleton, Monmouth and Ripon; Missouri Intercollegiate Athletic Association – Northwest Missouri; Missouri Valley Conference –; Minnesota Intercollegiate Athletic Conference –; North Central Conference –; Northwest Conference –; Pacific Coast Conference – USC; Rocky Mountain Conference – Utah; Southern California Intercollegiate Athletic Conference –; Southern Conference – Tulane; Southern Intercollegiate Athletic Conference –; Southwest Conference – SMU; Southwestern Athletic Conference –; Wisconsin Intercollegiate Athletic Conference – Wisconsin-Milwaukee | Pittsburgh; Purdue; USC | — |
| 1932 | Big Ten Conference – Michigan; Big Six Conference –; Border Intercollegiate Athletic Association –; Central Intercollegiate Athletic Association –; Far Western Football Conference –; Iowa Intercollegiate Athletic Conference –; Michigan Intercollegiate Athletic Association –; Midwest Collegiate Athletic Conference –; Missouri Intercollegiate Athletic Association –; Missouri Valley Conference –; Minnesota Intercollegiate Athletic Conference –; North Central Conference –; Northern Intercollegiate Conference –; Northwest Conference –; Pacific Coast Conference –; Rocky Mountain Conference – Utah; Southern California Intercollegiate Athletic Conference –; Southern Conference –; Southern Intercollegiate Athletic Conference –; Southwest Conference –; Southwestern Athletic Conference –; Wisconsin Intercollegiate Athletic Conference – | Colgate; Michigan; USC | — |
| 1933 | Big Ten Conference – Michigan; Big Six Conference –; Border Intercollegiate Athletic Association –; Central Intercollegiate Athletic Association –; Far Western Football Conference –; Iowa Intercollegiate Athletic Conference –; Lone Star Conference –; Michigan Intercollegiate Athletic Association –; Midwest Collegiate Athletic Conference –; Missouri Intercollegiate Athletic Association –; Missouri Valley Conference –; Minnesota Intercollegiate Athletic Conference –; North Central Conference –; Northern Intercollegiate Athletic Conference –; Northwest Conference –; Pacific Coast Conference –; Rocky Mountain Conference – Utah; Southeastern Conference –; Southern California Intercollegiate Athletic Conference –; Southern Conference –; Southern Intercollegiate Athletic Conference –; Southwest Conference –; Southwestern Athletic Conference –; Wisconsin Intercollegiate Athletic Conference – | Columbia; Michigan; Ohio State; Princeton; USC | — |
| 1934 | Big Ten Conference – Minnesota; Big Six Conference –; Border Intercollegiate Athletic Association –; Central Intercollegiate Athletic Association –; Far Western Football Conference –; Iowa Intercollegiate Athletic Conference –; Lone Star Conference –; Michigan Intercollegiate Athletic Association –; Midwest Collegiate Athletic Conference –; Missouri Intercollegiate Athletic Association –; Missouri Valley Conference –; Minnesota Intercollegiate Athletic Conference –; North Central Conference –; Northern Intercollegiate Athletic Conference –; Northwest Conference –; Pacific Coast Conference –; Rocky Mountain Conference –; Southeastern Conference –; Southern California Intercollegiate Athletic Conference –; Southern Conference –; Southern Intercollegiate Athletic Conference –; Southwest Conference –; Southwestern Athletic Conference –; Wisconsin Intercollegiate Athletic Conference – | Alabama; Minnesota; Pittsburgh | — |
| 1935 | Big Ten Conference – Minnesota and Ohio State; Big Six Conference –; Border Intercollegiate Athletic Association –; Central Intercollegiate Athletic Association –; Far Western Football Conference –; Iowa Intercollegiate Athletic Conference –; Lone Star Conference –; Michigan Intercollegiate Athletic Association –; Midwest Collegiate Athletic Conference –; Missouri Intercollegiate Athletic Association –; Missouri Valley Conference –; Minnesota Intercollegiate Athletic Conference –; North Central Conference –; Northern Intercollegiate Athletic Conference –; Northwest Conference –; Pacific Coast Conference –; Rocky Mountain Conference –; Southeastern Conference –; Southern California Intercollegiate Athletic Conference –; Southern Conference –; Southern Intercollegiate Athletic Conference –; Southwest Conference –; Southwestern Athletic Conference –; Wisconsin Intercollegiate Athletic Conference – | Minnesota; Princeton; SMU; TCU | Jay Berwanger – HB (Chicago) |
| 1936 | Big Ten Conference – Northwestern; Big Six Conference –; Border Intercollegiate Athletic Association –; Central Intercollegiate Athletic Association –; Far Western Football Conference –; Iowa Intercollegiate Athletic Conference –; Lone Star Conference –; Michigan Intercollegiate Athletic Association –; Midwest Collegiate Athletic Conference –; Missouri Intercollegiate Athletic Association –; Missouri Valley Conference –; Minnesota Intercollegiate Athletic Conference –; North Central Conference –; Northern Intercollegiate Athletic Conference –; Northwest Conference –; Pacific Coast Conference –; Rocky Mountain Conference –; Southeastern Conference –; Southern California Intercollegiate Athletic Conference –; Southern Conference –; Southern Intercollegiate Athletic Conference –; Southwest Conference –; Southwestern Athletic Conference –; Wisconsin Intercollegiate Athletic Conference – | Duke; LSU; Minnesota (AP); Pittsburgh | Larry Kelley – End (Yale) |
| 1937 | Big Ten Conference – Minnesota; Big Six Conference –; Border Intercollegiate Athletic Association –; Central Intercollegiate Athletic Association –; Far Western Football Conference –; Iowa Intercollegiate Athletic Conference –; Lone Star Conference –; Michigan Intercollegiate Athletic Association –; Midwest Collegiate Athletic Conference –; Missouri Intercollegiate Athletic Association –; Missouri Valley Conference –; Minnesota Intercollegiate Athletic Conference –; North Central Conference –; Northern Intercollegiate Athletic Conference –; Northwest Conference –; Pacific Coast Conference –; Rocky Mountain Conference –; Southeastern Conference –; Southern California Intercollegiate Athletic Conference –; Southern Conference –; Southern Intercollegiate Athletic Conference –; Southwest Conference –; Southwestern Athletic Conference –; Wisconsin Intercollegiate Athletic Conference – | California (Various); Pittsburgh (AP) | Clint Frank – HB (Yale) |
| 1938 | Big Ten Conference – Minnesota; Big Seven Conference – Utah; Big Six Conference –; Border Intercollegiate Athletic Association –; Central Intercollegiate Athletic Association –; Far Western Football Conference –; Iowa Intercollegiate Athletic Conference –; Lone Star Conference –; Michigan Intercollegiate Athletic Association –; Midwest Collegiate Athletic Conference –; Missouri Intercollegiate Athletic Association –; Missouri Valley Conference –; Minnesota Intercollegiate Athletic Conference –; North Central Conference –; Northern Intercollegiate Athletic Conference –; Northwest Conference –; Pacific Coast Conference –; Southeastern Conference –; Southern California Intercollegiate Athletic Conference –; Southern Conference –; Southern Intercollegiate Athletic Conference –; Southwest Conference –; Southwestern Athletic Conference –; Wisconsin Intercollegiate Athletic Conference – | Notre Dame; TCU (AP); Tennessee (Various) | Davey O'Brien – QB (TCU) |
| 1939 | Big Ten Conference – Ohio State; Big Seven Conference –; Big Six Conference –; Border Intercollegiate Athletic Association –; Central Intercollegiate Athletic Association –; Far Western Football Conference –; Iowa Intercollegiate Athletic Conference –; Lone Star Conference –; Michigan Intercollegiate Athletic Association –; Midwest Collegiate Athletic Conference –; Missouri Intercollegiate Athletic Association –; Missouri Valley Conference –; Minnesota Intercollegiate Athletic Conference –; North Central Conference –; Northern Intercollegiate Athletic Conference –; Northwest Conference –; Pacific Coast Conference –; Southeastern Conference –; Southern California Intercollegiate Athletic Conference –; Southern Conference –; Southern Intercollegiate Athletic Conference –; Southwest Conference –; Southwestern Athletic Conference –; Wisconsin Intercollegiate Athletic Conference – | Cornell; Texas A&M (AP); USC (Dickenson) | Nile Kinnick – HB (Iowa) |
| 1940 | Big Ten Conference –; Big Seven Conference –; Big Six Conference –; Border Intercollegiate Athletic Association –; Central Intercollegiate Athletic Association –; Far Western Football Conference –; Iowa Intercollegiate Athletic Conference –; Lone Star Conference –; Michigan Intercollegiate Athletic Association –; Midwest Collegiate Athletic Conference –; Missouri Intercollegiate Athletic Association –; Missouri Valley Conference –; Minnesota Intercollegiate Athletic Conference –; North Central Conference –; Northern Intercollegiate Athletic Conference –; Northwest Conference –; Pacific Coast Conference –; Southeastern Conference –; Southern California Intercollegiate Athletic Conference –; Southern Conference –; Southern Intercollegiate Athletic Conference –; Southwest Conference –; Southwestern Athletic Conference –; Wisconsin Intercollegiate Athletic Conference – | Boston College (Various); Minnesota (AP); Stanford (Helms, Poling System); Tennessee (Various) | Tom Harmon – HB (Michigan) |
| 1941 | Big Ten Conference –; Big Seven Conference –; Big Six Conference –; Border Intercollegiate Athletic Association –; Central Intercollegiate Athletic Association –; Far Western Football Conference –; Iowa Intercollegiate Athletic Conference –; Lone Star Conference –; Michigan Intercollegiate Athletic Association –; Midwest Collegiate Athletic Conference –; Missouri Intercollegiate Athletic Association –; Missouri Valley Conference –; Minnesota Intercollegiate Athletic Conference –; North Central Conference –; Northern Intercollegiate Athletic Conference –; Northwest Conference –; Pacific Coast Conference –; Southeastern Conference –; Southern California Intercollegiate Athletic Conference –; Southern Conference –; Southern Intercollegiate Athletic Conference –; Southwest Conference –; Southwestern Athletic Conference –; Wisconsin Intercollegiate Athletic Conference – | Alabama; Minnesota; Texas | Bruce Smith – HB (Minnesota) |
| 1942 | Big Ten Conference – Ohio State; Big Seven Conference –; Big Six Conference –; Border Intercollegiate Athletic Association –; Central Intercollegiate Athletic Association –; Far Western Football Conference –; Iowa Intercollegiate Athletic Conference –; Lone Star Conference –; Michigan Intercollegiate Athletic Association –; Midwest Collegiate Athletic Conference –; Missouri Intercollegiate Athletic Association –; Missouri Valley Conference –; Minnesota Intercollegiate Athletic Conference –; North Central Conference –; Northern Intercollegiate Athletic Conference –; Northwest Conference –; Pacific Coast Conference –; Southeastern Conference –; Southern California Intercollegiate Athletic Conference –; Southern Conference –; Southern Intercollegiate Athletic Conference –; Southwest Conference –; Southwestern Athletic Conference –; Wisconsin Intercollegiate Athletic Conference – | Georgia; Ohio State; Wisconsin | Frank Sinkwich – HB (Georgia) |
| 1943 | Big Ten Conference – Purdue and Michigan; Big Seven Conference –; Big Six Conference –; Border Intercollegiate Athletic Association –; Central Intercollegiate Athletic Association –; Far Western Football Conference –; Iowa Intercollegiate Athletic Conference –; Lone Star Conference –; Michigan Intercollegiate Athletic Association –; Midwest Collegiate Athletic Conference –; Missouri Intercollegiate Athletic Association –; Missouri Valley Conference –; Minnesota Intercollegiate Athletic Conference –; North Central Conference –; Northern Intercollegiate Athletic Conference –; Northwest Conference –; Pacific Coast Conference –; Southeastern Conference –; Southern California Intercollegiate Athletic Conference –; Southern Conference –; Southern Intercollegiate Athletic Conference –; Southwest Conference –; Southwestern Athletic Conference –; Wisconsin Intercollegiate Athletic Conference – | Notre Dame | Angelo Bertelli – QB (Notre Dame) |
| 1944 | Big Ten Conference – Ohio State; Big Seven Conference –; Big Six Conference –; Border Intercollegiate Athletic Association –; Central Intercollegiate Athletic Association –; Far Western Football Conference –; Iowa Intercollegiate Athletic Conference –; Lone Star Conference –; Michigan Intercollegiate Athletic Association –; Midwest Collegiate Athletic Conference –; Missouri Intercollegiate Athletic Association –; Missouri Valley Conference –; Minnesota Intercollegiate Athletic Conference –; North Central Conference –; Northern Intercollegiate Athletic Conference –; Northwest Conference –; Pacific Coast Conference –; Southeastern Conference –; Southern California Intercollegiate Athletic Conference –; Southern Conference –; Southern Intercollegiate Athletic Conference –; Southwest Conference –; Southwestern Athletic Conference –; Wisconsin Intercollegiate Athletic Conference – | Army; Ohio State | Les Horvath – HB/QB (Ohio State) |
| 1945 | Big Ten Conference – Indiana; Big Seven Conference –; Big Six Conference –; Border Intercollegiate Athletic Association –; Central Intercollegiate Athletic Association –; Far Western Football Conference –; Iowa Intercollegiate Athletic Conference –; Lone Star Conference –; Michigan Intercollegiate Athletic Association –; Midwest Collegiate Athletic Conference –; Missouri Intercollegiate Athletic Association –; Missouri Valley Conference –; Minnesota Intercollegiate Athletic Conference –; North Central Conference –; Northern Intercollegiate Athletic Conference –; Northwest Conference –; Pacific Coast Conference –; Southeastern Conference –; Southern California Intercollegiate Athletic Conference –; Southern Conference –; Southern Intercollegiate Athletic Conference –; Southwest Conference –; Southwestern Athletic Conference –; Wisconsin Intercollegiate Athletic Conference – | Alabama; Army; Oklahoma A&M | Doc Blanchard – FB (Army) |
| 1946 | Big Ten Conference –; Big Seven Conference –; Big Six Conference –; Border Intercollegiate Athletic Association –; Central Intercollegiate Athletic Association –; College Conference of Illinois –; Far Western Football Conference –; Iowa Intercollegiate Athletic Conference –; Lone Star Conference –; Michigan Intercollegiate Athletic Association –; Midwest Collegiate Athletic Conference –; Missouri Intercollegiate Athletic Association –; Missouri Valley Conference –; Minnesota Intercollegiate Athletic Conference –; North Central Conference –; Northern Intercollegiate Athletic Conference –; Northwest Conference –; Pacific Coast Conference –; Southeastern Conference –; Southern California Intercollegiate Athletic Conference –; Southern Conference –; Southern Intercollegiate Athletic Conference –; Southwest Conference –; Southwestern Athletic Conference –; Wisconsin Intercollegiate Athletic Conference – | Army; Georgia; Notre Dame | Glenn Davis – HB (Army) |
| 1947 | Big Ten Conference – Michigan; Big Six Conference –; Border Intercollegiate Athletic Association –; Central Intercollegiate Athletic Association –; College Conference of Illinois –; Far Western Football Conference –; Iowa Intercollegiate Athletic Conference –; Lone Star Conference –; Michigan Intercollegiate Athletic Association –; Mid-American Conference –; Midwest Collegiate Athletic Conference –; Missouri Intercollegiate Athletic Association –; Missouri Valley Conference –; Minnesota Intercollegiate Athletic Conference –; North Central Conference –; Northern Intercollegiate Athletic Conference –; Northwest Conference –; Pacific Coast Conference –; Skyline Six Conference –; Southeastern Conference –; Southern California Intercollegiate Athletic Conference –; Southern Conference –; Southern Intercollegiate Athletic Conference –; Southwest Conference –; Southwestern Athletic Conference –; Wisconsin Intercollegiate Athletic Conference –; Yankee Conference – | Michigan; Notre Dame | Johnny Lujack – QB (Notre Dame) |
| 1948 | Big Ten Conference – Michigan; Big Seven Conference –; Central Intercollegiate Athletic Association –; College Conference of Illinois –; Far Western Football Conference –; Iowa Intercollegiate Athletic Conference –; Lone Star Conference –; Michigan Intercollegiate Athletic Association –; Mid-American Conference –; Midwest Collegiate Athletic Conference –; Missouri Intercollegiate Athletic Association –; Missouri Valley Conference –; Minnesota Intercollegiate Athletic Conference –; North Central Conference –; Northern Intercollegiate Athletic Conference –; Northwest Conference –; Ohio Valley Conference –; Pacific Coast Conference –; Skyline Six Conference –; Southeastern Conference –; Southern California Intercollegiate Athletic Conference –; Southern Conference –; Southern Intercollegiate Athletic Conference –; Southwest Conference –; Southwestern Athletic Conference –; Wisconsin Intercollegiate Athletic Conference –; Yankee Conference – | Michigan | Doak Walker – HB (SMU) |
| 1949 | Big Ten Conference – Ohio State and Michigan; Big Seven Conference –; Central Intercollegiate Athletic Association –; College Conference of Illinois –; Far Western Football Conference –; Iowa Intercollegiate Athletic Conference –; Lone Star Conference –; Michigan Intercollegiate Athletic Association –; Mid-American Conference –; Midwest Collegiate Athletic Conference –; Missouri Intercollegiate Athletic Association –; Missouri Valley Conference –; Minnesota Intercollegiate Athletic Conference –; North Central Conference –; Northern Intercollegiate Athletic Conference –; Northwest Conference –; Ohio Valley Conference –; Pacific Coast Conference –; Skyline Six Conference –; Southeastern Conference –; Southern California Intercollegiate Athletic Conference –; Southern Conference –; Southern Intercollegiate Athletic Conference –; Southwest Conference –; Southwestern Athletic Conference –; Wisconsin Intercollegiate Athletic Conference –; Yankee Conference – | Notre Dame; Oklahoma | Leon Hart – End (Notre Dame) |
| 1950 | Big Ten Conference – Michigan; Big Seven Conference –; Central Intercollegiate Athletic Association –; College Conference of Illinois –; Far Western Football Conference –; Iowa Intercollegiate Athletic Conference –; Lone Star Conference –; Michigan Intercollegiate Athletic Association –; Mid-American Conference –; Midwest Collegiate Athletic Conference –; Missouri Intercollegiate Athletic Association –; Missouri Valley Conference –; Minnesota Intercollegiate Athletic Conference –; North Central Conference –; Northern Intercollegiate Athletic Conference –; Northwest Conference –; Ohio Valley Conference –; Pacific Coast Conference –; Skyline Six Conference –; Southeastern Conference –; Southern California Intercollegiate Athletic Conference –; Southern Conference –; Southern Intercollegiate Athletic Conference –; Southwest Conference –; Southwestern Athletic Conference –; Wisconsin Intercollegiate Athletic Conference –; Yankee Conference – | Kentucky; Oklahoma; Princeton; Tennessee | Vic Janowicz – HB (Ohio State) |
| 1951 | Big Ten Conference –; Big Seven Conference –; Central Intercollegiate Athletic Association –; College Conference of Illinois –; Far Western Football Conference –; Iowa Intercollegiate Athletic Conference –; Lone Star Conference –; Michigan Intercollegiate Athletic Association –; Mid-American Conference –; Midwest Collegiate Athletic Conference –; Missouri Intercollegiate Athletic Association –; Missouri Valley Conference –; Minnesota Intercollegiate Athletic Conference –; North Central Conference –; Northern Intercollegiate Athletic Conference –; Northwest Conference –; Ohio Valley Conference –; Pacific Coast Conference –; Skyline Eight Conference –; Southeastern Conference –; Southern California Intercollegiate Athletic Conference –; Southern Conference –; Southern Intercollegiate Athletic Conference –; Southwest Conference –; Southwestern Athletic Conference –; Wisconsin Intercollegiate Athletic Conference –; Yankee Conference – | Georgia Tech; Illinois; Maryland; Michigan State; Tennessee | Dick Kazmaier – HB (Princeton) |
| 1952 | Big Ten Conference – Wisconsin and Purdue; Big Seven Conference –; Central Intercollegiate Athletic Association –; College Conference of Illinois –; Far Western Football Conference –; Iowa Intercollegiate Athletic Conference –; Lone Star Conference –; Michigan Intercollegiate Athletic Association –; Mid-American Conference –; Midwest Collegiate Athletic Conference –; Missouri Intercollegiate Athletic Association –; Missouri Valley Conference –; Minnesota Intercollegiate Athletic Conference –; North Central Conference –; Northern Intercollegiate Athletic Conference –; Northwest Conference –; Ohio Valley Conference –; Pacific Coast Conference –; Skyline Eight Conference –; Southeastern Conference –; Southern California Intercollegiate Athletic Conference –; Southern Conference –; Southern Intercollegiate Athletic Conference –; Southwest Conference –; Southwestern Athletic Conference –; Wisconsin Intercollegiate Athletic Conference –; Yankee Conference – | Georgia Tech; Michigan State | Billy Vessels – HB (Oklahoma) |
| 1953 | Atlantic Coast Conference –; Big Ten Conference – Michigan State and Illinois; Big Seven Conference –; Central Intercollegiate Athletic Association –; College Conference of Illinois –; Far Western Football Conference –; Iowa Intercollegiate Athletic Conference –; Lone Star Conference –; Michigan Intercollegiate Athletic Association –; Mid-American Conference –; Midwest Collegiate Athletic Conference –; Missouri Intercollegiate Athletic Association –; Missouri Valley Conference –; Minnesota Intercollegiate Athletic Conference –; North Central Conference –; Northern Intercollegiate Athletic Conference –; Northwest Conference –; Ohio Valley Conference –; Pacific Coast Conference –; Skyline Eight Conference –; Southeastern Conference –; Southern California Intercollegiate Athletic Conference –; Southern Conference –; Southern Intercollegiate Athletic Conference –; Southwest Conference –; Southwestern Athletic Conference –; Wisconsin Intercollegiate Athletic Conference –; Yankee Conference – | Maryland; Notre Dame; Oklahoma | Johnny Lattner – HB (Notre Dame) |
| 1954 | Atlantic Coast Conference –; Big Ten Conference – Ohio State; Big Seven Conference –; Central Intercollegiate Athletic Association –; College Conference of Illinois –; Far Western Football Conference –; Iowa Intercollegiate Athletic Conference –; Lone Star Conference –; Michigan Intercollegiate Athletic Association –; Mid-American Conference –; Midwest Collegiate Athletic Conference –; Missouri Intercollegiate Athletic Association –; Missouri Valley Conference –; Minnesota Intercollegiate Athletic Conference –; North Central Conference –; Northern Intercollegiate Athletic Conference –; Northwest Conference –; Ohio Valley Conference –; Pacific Coast Conference –; Skyline Eight Conference –; Southeastern Conference –; Southern California Intercollegiate Athletic Conference –; Southern Conference –; Southern Intercollegiate Athletic Conference –; Southwest Conference –; Southwestern Athletic Conference –; Wisconsin Intercollegiate Athletic Conference –; Yankee Conference – | Ohio State; UCLA | Alan Ameche – FB (Wisconsin) |
| 1955 | Atlantic Coast Conference –; Big Ten Conference – Ohio State; Big Seven Conference –; Central Intercollegiate Athletic Association –; College Conference of Illinois –; Far Western Football Conference –; Iowa Intercollegiate Athletic Conference –; Lone Star Conference –; Michigan Intercollegiate Athletic Association –; Mid-American Conference –; Midwest Collegiate Athletic Conference –; Missouri Intercollegiate Athletic Association –; Missouri Valley Conference –; Minnesota Intercollegiate Athletic Conference –; North Central Conference –; Northern Intercollegiate Athletic Conference –; Northwest Conference –; Ohio Valley Conference –; Pacific Coast Conference –; Skyline Eight Conference –; Southeastern Conference –; Southern California Intercollegiate Athletic Conference –; Southern Conference –; Southern Intercollegiate Athletic Conference –; Southwest Conference –; Southwestern Athletic Conference –; Wisconsin Intercollegiate Athletic Conference –; Yankee Conference – | Michigan State; Oklahoma | Howard Cassady – HB (Ohio State) |
| 1956 | NCAA; Atlantic Coast Conference –; Big Ten Conference –; Big Seven Conference –; Ivy League –; Mid-American Conference –; Missouri Valley Conference –; Ohio Valley Conference –; Pacific Coast Conference –; Skyline Eight Conference –; Southeastern Conference –; Southern Conference –; Southwest Conference –; Southwestern Athletic Conference –; Yankee Conference –; Central Intercollegiate Athletic Association –; College Conference of Illinois –; Far Western Football Conference –; Iowa Intercollegiate Athletic Conference –; Lone Star Conference –; Michigan Intercollegiate Athletic Association –; Midwest Collegiate Athletic Conference –; Missouri Intercollegiate Athletic Association –; Minnesota Intercollegiate Athletic Conference –; North Central Conference –; Northern Intercollegiate Athletic Conference –; Northwest Conference –; Southern California Intercollegiate Athletic Conference –; Southern Intercollegiate Athletic Conference –; Wisconsin Intercollegiate Athletic Conference –; Others; NAIA Football National Championship –; NJCAA National Football Championship – | Georgia Tech; Iowa; Oklahoma; Tennessee | Paul Hornung – QB (Notre Dame) |
| 1957 | NCAA; Atlantic Coast Conference –; Big Ten Conference – Ohio State; Big Seven Conference –; Ivy League –; Mid-American Conference –; Missouri Valley Conference –; Ohio Valley Conference –; Pacific Coast Conference –; Skyline Eight Conference –; Southeastern Conference –; Southern Conference –; Southwest Conference –; Southwestern Athletic Conference –; Yankee Conference –; Central Intercollegiate Athletic Association –; College Conference of Illinois –; Far Western Football Conference –; Iowa Intercollegiate Athletic Conference –; Lone Star Conference –; Michigan Intercollegiate Athletic Association –; Midwest Collegiate Athletic Conference –; Missouri Intercollegiate Athletic Association –; Minnesota Intercollegiate Athletic Conference –; North Central Conference –; Northern Intercollegiate Athletic Conference –; Northwest Conference –; Southern California Intercollegiate Athletic Conference –; Southern Intercollegiate Athletic Conference –; Wisconsin Intercollegiate Athletic Conference –; Others; NAIA Football National Championship –; NJCAA National Football Championship – | Auburn; Michigan State; Ohio State; Oklahoma | John David Crow – HB (Texas A&M) |
| 1958 | NCAA; Atlantic Coast Conference –; Big 8 Conference –; Big Ten Conference –; Ivy League –; Mid-American Conference –; Missouri Valley Conference –; Ohio Valley Conference –; Pacific Coast Conference –; Skyline Eight Conference –; Southeastern Conference –; Southern Conference –; Southwest Conference –; Southwestern Athletic Conference –; Yankee Conference –; Central Intercollegiate Athletic Association –; College Conference of Illinois –; Far Western Football Conference –; Iowa Intercollegiate Athletic Conference –; Lone Star Conference –; Michigan Intercollegiate Athletic Association –; Middle Atlantic Conference –; Midwest Collegiate Athletic Conference –; Missouri Intercollegiate Athletic Association –; Minnesota Intercollegiate Athletic Conference –; North Central Conference –; Northern Intercollegiate Athletic Conference –; Northwest Conference –; Southern California Intercollegiate Athletic Conference –; Southern Intercollegiate Athletic Conference –; Wisconsin Intercollegiate Athletic Conference –; Others; NAIA Football National Championship –; NJCAA National Football Championship – | Auburn; Iowa; LSU | Pete Dawkins – HB (Army) |
| 1959 | NCAA; Athletic Association of Western Universities –; Atlantic Coast Conference –; Big 8 Conference –; Big Ten Conference –; Ivy League –; Mid-American Conference –; Missouri Valley Conference –; Ohio Valley Conference –; Skyline Eight Conference –; Southeastern Conference –; Southern Conference –; Southwest Conference –; Southwestern Athletic Conference –; Yankee Conference –; Central Intercollegiate Athletic Association –; College Conference of Illinois –; Far Western Football Conference –; Iowa Intercollegiate Athletic Conference –; Lone Star Conference –; Michigan Intercollegiate Athletic Association –; Middle Atlantic Conference –; Midwest Collegiate Athletic Conference –; Missouri Intercollegiate Athletic Association –; Minnesota Intercollegiate Athletic Conference –; North Central Conference –; Northern Intercollegiate Athletic Conference –; Northwest Conference –; Southern California Intercollegiate Athletic Conference –; Southern Intercollegiate Athletic Conference –; Wisconsin Intercollegiate Athletic Conference –; Others; NAIA Football National Championship –; NJCAA National Football Championship – | Ole Miss; Syracuse | Billy Cannon – HB (LSU) |
| 1960 | NCAA; Atlantic Coast Conference –; Big 8 Conference –; Big Five Conference –; Big Ten Conference –; Ivy League –; Mid-American Conference –; Missouri Valley Conference –; Ohio Valley Conference –; Skyline Eight Conference –; Southeastern Conference –; Southern Conference –; Southwest Conference –; Southwestern Athletic Conference –; Yankee Conference –; Central Intercollegiate Athletic Association –; College Conference of Illinois –; Far Western Football Conference –; Iowa Intercollegiate Athletic Conference –; Lone Star Conference –; Michigan Intercollegiate Athletic Association –; Middle Atlantic Conference –; Midwest Collegiate Athletic Conference –; Missouri Intercollegiate Athletic Association –; Minnesota Intercollegiate Athletic Conference –; North Central Conference –; Northern Intercollegiate Athletic Conference –; Northwest Conference –; Southern California Intercollegiate Athletic Conference –; Southern Intercollegiate Athletic Conference –; Wisconsin Intercollegiate Athletic Conference –; Others; NAIA Football National Championship –; NJCAA National Football Championship – | Iowa; Minnesota; Missouri; Ole Miss; Washington | Joe Bellino – HB (Navy) |
| 1961 | NCAA; Atlantic Coast Conference –; Big 8 Conference –; Big Five Conference –; Big Ten Conference – Ohio State; Ivy League –; Mid-American Conference –; Missouri Valley Conference –; Ohio Valley Conference –; Skyline Eight Conference –; Southeastern Conference –; Southern Conference –; Southwest Conference –; Southwestern Athletic Conference –; Yankee Conference –; Central Intercollegiate Athletic Association –; College Conference of Illinois –; Far Western Football Conference –; Iowa Intercollegiate Athletic Conference –; Lone Star Conference –; Michigan Intercollegiate Athletic Association –; Middle Atlantic Conference –; Midwest Collegiate Athletic Conference –; Missouri Intercollegiate Athletic Association –; Minnesota Intercollegiate Athletic Conference –; North Central Conference –; Northern Intercollegiate Athletic Conference –; Northwest Conference –; Southern California Intercollegiate Athletic Conference –; Southern Intercollegiate Athletic Conference –; Wisconsin Intercollegiate Athletic Conference –; Others; NAIA Football National Championship –; NJCAA National Football Championship – | Alabama; Ohio State | Ernie Davis – HB (Syracuse) |

=== University and College Divisions (1962–1972) ===
| Year | Conference champions | National champion | Heisman Trophy |
|---|---|---|---|
| 1962 | NCAA; University Division; Atlantic Coast Conference –; Big 8 Conference –; Big Five Conference –; Big Ten Conference –; Ivy League –; Mid-American Conference –; Missouri Valley Conference –; Ohio Valley Conference –; Skyline Eight Conference –; Southeastern Conference –; Southern Conference –; Southwest Conference –; Southwestern Athletic Conference –; Western Athletic Conference –; Yankee Conference –; College Division; Central Intercollegiate Athletic Association –; College Athletic Conference –; College Conference of Illinois –; Far Western Football Conference –; Iowa Intercollegiate Athletic Conference –; Lone Star Conference –; Michigan Intercollegiate Athletic Association –; Middle Atlantic Conference –; Midwest Collegiate Athletic Conference –; Missouri Intercollegiate Athletic Association –; Minnesota Intercollegiate Athletic Conference –; North Central Conference –; Northern Intercollegiate Athletic Conference –; Northwest Conference –; Southern California Intercollegiate Athletic Conference –; Southern Intercollegiate Athletic Conference –; Wisconsin Intercollegiate Athletic Conference –; Others; NAIA Football National Championship –; NJCAA National Football Championship – | Alabama; LSU; Ole Miss; USC | Terry Baker – QB (Oregon State) |
| 1963 | NCAA; University Division; Atlantic Coast Conference –; Big 8 Conference –; Big Six Conference –; Big Sky Conference –; Big Ten Conference – Illinois; Ivy League –; Mid-American Conference –; Missouri Valley Conference –; Ohio Valley Conference –; Skyline Eight Conference –; Southeastern Conference –; Southern Conference –; Southwest Conference –; Southwestern Athletic Conference –; Western Athletic Conference –; Yankee Conference –; College Division; Central Intercollegiate Athletic Association –; College Athletic Conference –; College Conference of Illinois –; Far Western Football Conference –; Iowa Intercollegiate Athletic Conference –; Lone Star Conference –; Michigan Intercollegiate Athletic Association –; Middle Atlantic Conference –; Midwest Collegiate Athletic Conference –; Missouri Intercollegiate Athletic Association –; Minnesota Intercollegiate Athletic Conference –; North Central Conference –; Northern Intercollegiate Athletic Conference –; Northwest Conference –; Southern California Intercollegiate Athletic Conference –; Southern Intercollegiate Athletic Conference –; Wisconsin Intercollegiate Athletic Conference –; Others; NAIA Football National Championship –; NJCAA National Football Championship – | Texas | Roger Staubach – QB (Navy) |
| 1964 | NCAA; University Division; Atlantic Coast Conference –; Big 8 Conference –; Big Sky Conference –; Big Ten Conference – Michigan; Ivy League –; Mid-American Conference –; Missouri Valley Conference –; Ohio Valley Conference –; Pacific-8 Conference –; Skyline Eight Conference –; Southeastern Conference –; Southern Conference –; Southwest Conference –; Southwestern Athletic Conference –; Western Athletic Conference –; Yankee Conference –; College Division; Central Intercollegiate Athletic Association –; College Athletic Conference –; College Conference of Illinois –; Far Western Football Conference –; Iowa Intercollegiate Athletic Conference –; Lone Star Conference –; Michigan Intercollegiate Athletic Association –; Middle Atlantic Conference –; Midwest Collegiate Athletic Conference –; Missouri Intercollegiate Athletic Association –; Minnesota Intercollegiate Athletic Conference –; North Central Conference –; Northern Intercollegiate Athletic Conference –; Northwest Conference –; Southern California Intercollegiate Athletic Conference –; Southern Intercollegiate Athletic Conference –; Southland Conference –; Wisconsin Intercollegiate Athletic Conference –; Others; NAIA Football National Championship –; NJCAA National Football Championship – | Alabama; Arkansas; Michigan; Notre Dame | John Huarte – QB (Notre Dame) |
| 1965 | NCAA; University Division; Atlantic Coast Conference –; Big 8 Conference –; Big Sky Conference –; Big Ten Conference – Michigan State; Ivy League –; Mid-American Conference –; Missouri Valley Conference –; Ohio Valley Conference –; Pacific-8 Conference –; Skyline Eight Conference –; Southeastern Conference –; Southern Conference –; Southwest Conference –; Southwestern Athletic Conference –; Western Athletic Conference –; Yankee Conference –; College Division; Central Intercollegiate Athletic Association –; College Athletic Conference –; College Conference of Illinois –; Far Western Football Conference –; Iowa Intercollegiate Athletic Conference –; Lone Star Conference –; Michigan Intercollegiate Athletic Association –; Middle Atlantic Conference –; Midwest Collegiate Athletic Conference –; Missouri Intercollegiate Athletic Association –; Minnesota Intercollegiate Athletic Conference –; New England Football Conference –; North Central Conference –; Northern Intercollegiate Athletic Conference –; Northwest Conference –; Southern California Intercollegiate Athletic Conference –; Southern Intercollegiate Athletic Conference –; Southland Conference –; Wisconsin Intercollegiate Athletic Conference –; Others; NAIA Football National Championship –; NJCAA National Football Championship – | Alabama; Michigan State | Mike Garrett – HB (USC) |
| 1966 | NCAA; University Division; Atlantic Coast Conference –; Big 8 Conference –; Big Sky Conference –; Big Ten Conference – Michigan State; Ivy League –; Mid-American Conference –; Missouri Valley Conference –; Ohio Valley Conference –; Pacific-8 Conference –; Skyline Eight Conference –; Southeastern Conference –; Southern Conference –; Southwest Conference –; Southwestern Athletic Conference –; Western Athletic Conference –; Yankee Conference –; College Division; Central Intercollegiate Athletic Association –; College Athletic Conference –; College Conference of Illinois –; Far Western Football Conference –; Iowa Intercollegiate Athletic Conference –; Lone Star Conference –; Michigan Intercollegiate Athletic Association –; Middle Atlantic Conference –; Midwest Collegiate Athletic Conference –; Missouri Intercollegiate Athletic Association –; Minnesota Intercollegiate Athletic Conference –; New England Football Conference –; North Central Conference –; Northern Intercollegiate Athletic Conference –; Northwest Conference –; Southern California Intercollegiate Athletic Conference –; Southern Intercollegiate Athletic Conference –; Southland Conference –; Wisconsin Intercollegiate Athletic Conference –; Others; NAIA Football National Championship –; NJCAA National Football Championship – | Alabama; Michigan State; Notre Dame | Steve Spurrier – QB (Florida) |
| 1967 | NCAA; University Division; Atlantic Coast Conference –; Big 8 Conference –; Big Sky Conference –; Big Ten Conference – Indiana, Purdue; Ivy League –; Mid-American Conference –; Missouri Valley Conference –; Ohio Valley Conference –; Pacific-8 Conference –; Skyline Eight Conference –; Southeastern Conference –; Southern Conference –; Southwest Conference –; Southwestern Athletic Conference –; Western Athletic Conference –; Yankee Conference –; College Division; Central Intercollegiate Athletic Association –; College Athletic Conference –; College Conference of Illinois and Wisconsin –; Far Western Football Conference –; Iowa Intercollegiate Athletic Conference –; Lone Star Conference –; Michigan Intercollegiate Athletic Association –; Middle Atlantic Conference –; Midwest Collegiate Athletic Conference –; Missouri Intercollegiate Athletic Association –; Minnesota Intercollegiate Athletic Conference –; New England Football Conference –; North Central Conference –; Northern Intercollegiate Athletic Conference –; Northwest Conference –; Southern California Intercollegiate Athletic Conference –; Southern Intercollegiate Athletic Conference –; Southland Conference –; Wisconsin Intercollegiate Athletic Conference –; Others; NAIA Football National Championship –; NJCAA National Football Championship – | Notre Dame; Oklahoma; Tennessee; USC | Gary Beban – QB (UCLA) |
| 1968 | NCAA; University Division; Atlantic Coast Conference –; Big 8 Conference –; Big Sky Conference –; Big Ten Conference – Ohio State; Ivy League –; Mid-American Conference –; Missouri Valley Conference –; Ohio Valley Conference –; Pacific-8 Conference –; Skyline Eight Conference –; Southeastern Conference –; Southern Conference –; Southwest Conference –; Southwestern Athletic Conference –; Western Athletic Conference –; Yankee Conference –; College Division; Central Intercollegiate Athletic Association –; College Athletic Conference –; College Conference of Illinois and Wisconsin –; Far Western Football Conference –; Iowa Intercollegiate Athletic Conference –; Lone Star Conference –; Michigan Intercollegiate Athletic Association –; Middle Atlantic Conference –; Midwest Collegiate Athletic Conference –; Missouri Intercollegiate Athletic Association –; Minnesota Intercollegiate Athletic Conference –; New England Football Conference –; North Central Conference –; Northern Intercollegiate Athletic Conference –; Northwest Conference –; Southern California Intercollegiate Athletic Conference –; Southern Intercollegiate Athletic Conference –; Southland Conference –; Wisconsin Intercollegiate Athletic Conference –; Others; NAIA Football National Championship –; NJCAA National Football Championship – | Georgia; Ohio State; Texas | O. J. Simpson – HB (USC) |
| 1969 | NCAA; University Division; Atlantic Coast Conference –; Big 8 Conference –; Big Sky Conference –; Big Ten Conference – Ohio State and Michigan; Ivy League –; Mid-American Conference –; Missouri Valley Conference –; Ohio Valley Conference –; Pacific-8 Conference –; Pacific Coast Athletic Association –; Skyline Eight Conference –; Southeastern Conference –; Southern Conference –; Southwest Conference –; Southwestern Athletic Conference –; Western Athletic Conference –; Yankee Conference –; College Division; Central Intercollegiate Athletic Association –; College Athletic Conference –; College Conference of Illinois and Wisconsin –; Far Western Football Conference –; Iowa Intercollegiate Athletic Conference –; Lone Star Conference –; Michigan Intercollegiate Athletic Association –; Middle Atlantic Conference –; Midwest Collegiate Athletic Conference –; Missouri Intercollegiate Athletic Association –; Minnesota Intercollegiate Athletic Conference –; New England Football Conference –; New Jersey State Athletic Conference –; North Central Conference –; Northern Intercollegiate Athletic Conference –; Northwest Conference –; Southern California Intercollegiate Athletic Conference –; Southern Intercollegiate Athletic Conference –; Southland Conference –; Wisconsin Intercollegiate Athletic Conference –; Others; NAIA Football National Championship –; NJCAA National Football Championship – | Ohio State; Penn State; Texas | Steve Owens – HB (Oklahoma) |
| 1970 | NCAA; University Division; Atlantic Coast Conference –; Big 8 Conference –; Big Sky Conference –; Big Ten Conference – Ohio State; Ivy League –; Mid-American Conference –; Missouri Valley Conference –; Ohio Valley Conference –; Pacific-8 Conference –; Pacific Coast Athletic Association –; Skyline Eight Conference –; Southeastern Conference –; Southern Conference –; Southwest Conference –; Southwestern Athletic Conference –; Western Athletic Conference –; Yankee Conference –; College Division; Central Intercollegiate Athletic Association –; College Athletic Conference –; College Conference of Illinois and Wisconsin –; Far Western Football Conference –; Independent College Athletic Conference –; Iowa Intercollegiate Athletic Conference –; Lone Star Conference –; Michigan Intercollegiate Athletic Association –; Middle Atlantic Conference –; Midwest Collegiate Athletic Conference –; Missouri Intercollegiate Athletic Association –; Minnesota Intercollegiate Athletic Conference –; New England Football Conference –; New Jersey State Athletic Conference –; North Central Conference –; Northern Intercollegiate Athletic Conference –; Northwest Conference –; Southern California Intercollegiate Athletic Conference –; Southern Intercollegiate Athletic Conference –; Southland Conference –; Wisconsin Intercollegiate Athletic Conference –; Others; NAIA Football National Championship –; NJCAA National Football Championship – | Arizona State; Nebraska; Notre Dame; Ohio State; Texas | Jim Plunkett – QB (Stanford) |
| 1971 | NCAA; University Division; Atlantic Coast Conference –; Big 8 Conference –; Big Sky Conference –; Big Ten Conference – Michigan; Ivy League –; Mid-American Conference –; Mid-Eastern Athletic Conference –; Missouri Valley Conference –; Ohio Valley Conference –; Pacific-8 Conference –; Pacific Coast Athletic Association –; Skyline Eight Conference –; Southeastern Conference –; Southern Conference –; Southwest Conference –; Southwestern Athletic Conference –; Western Athletic Conference –; Yankee Conference –; College Division; Central Intercollegiate Athletic Association –; College Athletic Conference –; College Conference of Illinois and Wisconsin –; Far Western Football Conference –; Independent College Athletic Conference –; Iowa Intercollegiate Athletic Conference –; Lone Star Conference –; Michigan Intercollegiate Athletic Association –; Middle Atlantic Conference –; Midwest Collegiate Athletic Conference –; Missouri Intercollegiate Athletic Association –; Minnesota Intercollegiate Athletic Conference –; New England Football Conference –; New Jersey State Athletic Conference –; North Central Conference –; Northern Intercollegiate Athletic Conference –; Northwest Conference –; Southern California Intercollegiate Athletic Conference –; Southern Intercollegiate Athletic Conference –; Southland Conference –; Wisconsin Intercollegiate Athletic Conference –; Others; NAIA Football National Championship –; NJCAA National Football Championship – | Nebraska | Pat Sullivan – QB (Auburn) |
| 1972 | NCAA; University Division; Atlantic Coast Conference –; Big 8 Conference –; Big Sky Conference –; Big Ten Conference – Ohio State and Michigan; Ivy League –; Mid-American Conference –; Mid-Eastern Athletic Conference –; Missouri Valley Conference –; Ohio Valley Conference –; Pacific-8 Conference –; Pacific Coast Athletic Association –; Skyline Eight Conference –; Southeastern Conference –; Southern Conference –; Southwest Conference –; Southwestern Athletic Conference –; Western Athletic Conference –; Yankee Conference –; College Division; Central Intercollegiate Athletic Association –; College Athletic Conference –; College Conference of Illinois and Wisconsin –; Far Western Football Conference –; Gulf South Conference –; Independent College Athletic Conference –; Iowa Intercollegiate Athletic Conference –; Lone Star Conference –; Michigan Intercollegiate Athletic Association –; Middle Atlantic Conference –; Midwest Collegiate Athletic Conference –; Missouri Intercollegiate Athletic Association –; Minnesota Intercollegiate Athletic Conference –; New England Football Conference –; New Jersey State Athletic Conference –; North Central Conference –; Northern Intercollegiate Athletic Conference –; Northwest Conference –; Rocky Mountain Athletic Conference –; Southern California Intercollegiate Athletic Conference –; Southern Intercollegiate Athletic Conference –; Southland Conference –; Wisconsin Intercollegiate Athletic Conference –; Others; NAIA Football National Championship –; NJCAA National Football Championship – | USC | Johnny Rodgers – WR (Nebraska) |

=== Division I only (1973–1977) ===
After the 1972 season, the Central Intercollegiate Athletic Association, Far Western Football Conference, Great Lakes Intercollegiate Athletic Conference, Gulf South Conference, Lone Star Conference, Missouri Intercollegiate Athletic Association, North Central Conference, Northern Intercollegiate Conference, Pennsylvania State Athletic Conference, Rocky Mountain Athletic Conference, the Southern Intercollegiate Athletic Conference, and the Southland Conference became part of Division II. The inaugural NCAA Division II Football Championship was played in Sacramento, California in December 1973 following the 1973 NCAA Division II football season. Division II is differentiated from Division I by its reduced number of athletic scholarships. At the same time, the College Athletic Conference, College Conference of Illinois and Wisconsin, Independent College Athletic Conference, Iowa Intercollegiate Athletic Conference, Michigan Intercollegiate Athletic Association, Middle Atlantic Conference, Midwest Collegiate Athletic Conference, Minnesota Intercollegiate Athletic Conference, New England Football Conference, New Jersey State Athletic Conference, Northwest Conference, Southern Intercollegiate Athletic Conference, Southern California Intercollegiate Athletic Conference, and the Wisconsin Intercollegiate Athletic Conference became members of Division III. The inaugural NCAA Division III Football Championship was played in Phenix City, Alabama in December 1973 following the 1973 NCAA Division III football season. Division III schools, unlike higher NCAA divisions, are not permitted to grant any athletic scholarships.

| Year | Conference champions | National champion | Heisman Trophy |
|---|---|---|---|
| 1973 | NCAA; Atlantic Coast Conference –; Big 8 Conference –; Big Sky Conference –; Big Ten Conference – Ohio State and Michigan; Ivy League –; Mid-American Conference –; Mid-Eastern Athletic Conference –; Missouri Valley Conference –; Ohio Valley Conference –; Pacific-8 Conference –; Pacific Coast Athletic Association –; Skyline Eight Conference –; Southeastern Conference –; Southern Conference –; Southwest Conference –; Southwestern Athletic Conference –; Western Athletic Conference –; Yankee Conference –; Others; NAIA Football National Championship –; NJCAA National Football Championship – | Alabama; Michigan; Notre Dame; Ohio State; Oklahoma | John Cappelletti – HB (Penn State) |
| 1974 | NCAA; Atlantic Coast Conference –; Big 8 Conference –; Big Sky Conference –; Big Ten Conference – Ohio State and Michigan; Ivy League –; Mid-American Conference –; Mid-Eastern Athletic Conference –; Missouri Valley Conference –; Ohio Valley Conference –; Pacific-8 Conference –; Pacific Coast Athletic Association –; Skyline Eight Conference –; Southeastern Conference –; Southern Conference –; Southwest Conference –; Southwestern Athletic Conference –; Western Athletic Conference –; Yankee Conference –; Others; NAIA Football National Championship –; NJCAA National Football Championship – | Ohio State; Oklahoma; USC | Archie Griffin – RB (Ohio State) |
| 1975 | NCAA; Atlantic Coast Conference –; Big 8 Conference –; Big Sky Conference –; Big Ten Conference – Ohio State; Ivy League –; Mid-American Conference –; Mid-Eastern Athletic Conference –; Missouri Valley Conference –; Ohio Valley Conference –; Pacific-8 Conference –; Pacific Coast Athletic Association –; Skyline Eight Conference –; Southeastern Conference –; Southern Conference –; Southland Conference –; Southwest Conference –; Southwestern Athletic Conference –; Western Athletic Conference –; Yankee Conference –; Others; NAIA Football National Championship –; NJCAA National Football Championship – | Alabama; Arizona State; Ohio State; Oklahoma | Archie Griffin – RB (Ohio State) |
| 1976 | NCAA; Atlantic Coast Conference –; Big 8 Conference –; Big Sky Conference –; Big Ten Conference – Michigan and Ohio State; Ivy League –; Mid-American Conference –; Mid-Eastern Athletic Conference –; Missouri Valley Conference –; Ohio Valley Conference –; Pacific-8 Conference –; Pacific Coast Athletic Association –; Skyline Eight Conference –; Southeastern Conference –; Southern Conference –; Southland Conference –; Southwest Conference –; Southwestern Athletic Conference –; Western Athletic Conference –; Yankee Conference –; Others; NAIA Football National Championship –; NJCAA National Football Championship – | Michigan; Pittsburgh; USC | Tony Dorsett – RB (Pittsburgh) |
| 1977 | NCAA; Atlantic Coast Conference –; Big 8 Conference –; Big Sky Conference –; Big Ten Conference – Michigan and Ohio State; Ivy League –; Mid-American Conference –; Mid-Eastern Athletic Conference –; Missouri Valley Conference –; Ohio Valley Conference –; Pacific-8 Conference –; Pacific Coast Athletic Association –; Skyline Eight Conference –; Southeastern Conference –; Southern Conference –; Southland Conference –; Southwest Conference –; Southwestern Athletic Conference –; Western Athletic Conference –; Yankee Conference –; Others; NAIA Football National Championship –; NJCAA National Football Championship – | Alabama; Arkansas; Notre Dame; Texas | Earl Campbell – RB (Texas) |

=== Division I-A/FBS and I-AA/FCS split (1978–present) ===
After the 1977 season, NCAA Division I would split into Division I–A (now the FBS) and Division I–AA (now the FCS) for football only. The Atlantic Coast Conference, Big Eight Conference, Big Ten Conference, Ivy League, Mid-American Conference, Missouri Valley Conference, Pacific Coast Athletic Association, Pacific-10 Conference, Southeastern Conference, Southern Conference, Southland Conference, Southwest Conference, and the Western Athletic Conference became part of Division I–A. The Big Sky Conference and the Southwestern Athletic Conference would depart from Division I to join the Mid-Eastern Athletic Conference, Ohio Valley Conference, and the Yankee Conference reclassifying from NCAA Division II to create Division I–AA. The inaugural NCAA Division I Football Championship was played in Wichita Falls, Texas on December 16, 1978 following the 1978 NCAA Division I-AA football season. Division I–AA schools are usually smaller in size than Division I–A schools while also offering fewer athletic scholarships. The Ivy League, Southern Conference, and Southland Conference would eventually make the transition from I-A to I-AA in subsequent years.
