= Grand Lodge of Colorado =

Masonic Grand Lodge in Colorado, US

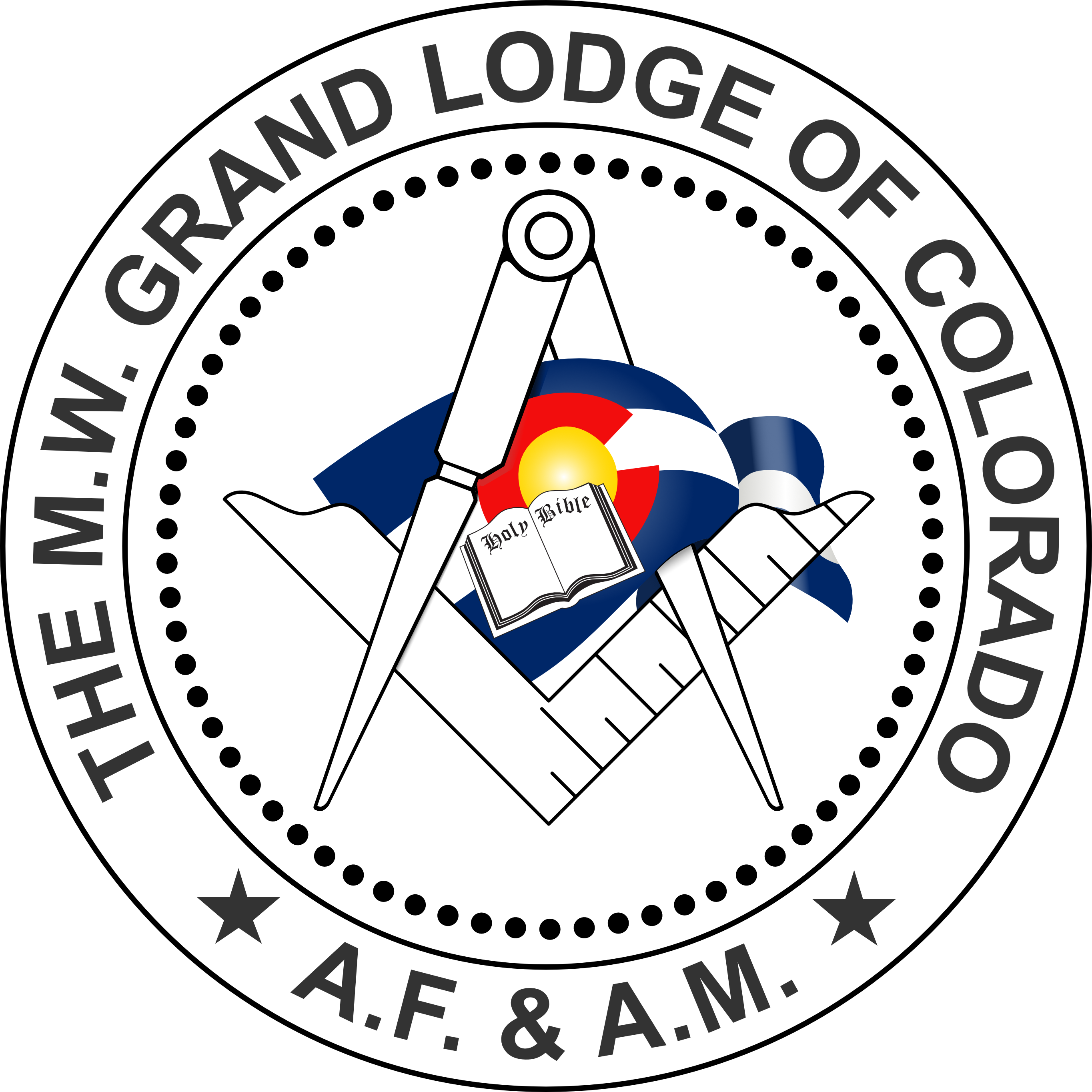
- Seal of the Grand Lodge of Colorado
- Established: 2 August 1861; 165 years ago
- Location: United States
- Region served: Colorado
- Website: www.coloradofreemasons.org

The Most Worshipful Grand Lodge of Ancient Free and Accepted Masons of Colorado, also known as the M.W. Grand Lodge of Colorado, A.F.&A.M., or simply the Grand Lodge of Colorado, is a Masonic Grand Lodge, being one of two sovereign Masonic jurisdictions in the State of Colorado, having a mutual recognition and relationship by compact with the Most Worshipful Prince Hall Grand Lodge of Colorado and its jurisdiction. It was originally formed in 1861 by three lodges holding charters from the Grand Lodge of Nebraska and the Grand Lodge of Kansas. It currently has 114 active Masonic lodges in its jurisdiction, along with four memorial lodges and one research lodge.

== History ==
=== Pre-Grand Lodge ===
The first meeting of Masons in what is today the State of Colorado, then still part of the Kansas Territory, was on 3 November 1858. J. D. Ramage gives an account that, after he arrived at the junction of Cherry Creek and the South Platte River, which came to be called Auraria, and is now called Denver. Ramage was approached by Henry Allen, who shouted to him and gave a Masonic sign, then pointed toward a tent. Ramage would join Allen, along with William M. Slaughter, Dr. Levi J. Russell, Andrew Sagendorf, Oscar E. Lehow, and Charles H. Blake. These men would meet every Saturday to exchange "news of any mines we might discover, or any information which might be beneficial to the brethren, Masonically or financially, would at the next meeting, be given to the Masons there assembled." Their gathering was not an official lodge meeting, but rather an informal gathering of Masons to benefit each other. By 27 December 1858, there were twenty-six Masons in Auraria, holding dinner together to celebrate the Feast of Saint John the Evangelist, and had to borrow a tablecloth from a Mormon family, but nonetheless had no chairs to sit on. These early gatherings of Denver-Auraria Masons met in the Lehow-Sagendorf Cabin near the junction of Cherry Creek and the South Platte River.

It was noted by John Chivington that Masonic lodges existed in Colorado before churches. He would remark: "On May 8, 1860, I arrived in Denver, published an appointment, and preached the following Sunday in the Masonic Hall. Henry Allen founded a Masonic Lodge in Colorado long before there was a church or school."

What is recognized as the first Masonic hall in Colorado is in Central City. In May 1859, John H. Gregory discovered a large deposit of gold in the area of modern-day Central City and Black Hawk, what at the time came to be called "Gregory's Diggings." A plot of land would be secured by approximately 100 or more Masons who resided in the area, and there built a cabin. The site today is marked by a granite marker located between Central City and Black Hawk.

=== Formation ===
The Grand Lodge of Colorado was originally formed as the "Most Ancient and Honorable Fraternity of Free and Accepted Masons of Colorado" at Golden City, Colorado Territory, in 1861. The Masonic convention to form the Grand Lodge was opened on 2 August 1861 and concluded the following day. Three lodges formed the Grand Lodge of Colorado: Golden City Lodge No. 34 of Golden City (charter from the Grand Lodge of Kansas), Summit Lodge No. 7 of Parkville, and Rocky Mountain Lodge No. 8 of Gold Hill (the latter two lodges with charters from Nebraska). There were three other lodges in the Territory of Colorado when the Grand Lodge was formed: Nevada Lodge No. 36 of Nevada City (dispensation from Kansas), Auraria Lodge No. 37 of Denver (dispensation from Kansas), and Central City Lodge U.D. of Central City (dispensation from Nebraska). It had been presumed that Nevada Lodge was ignorant of the formation of the Grand Lodge of Colorado, and that is why they petitioned for dispensation and a charter from the Grand Lodge of Kansas. However, according to members of Nevada Lodge, they withheld from participating in the convention because the Colorado Territory was formerly a part of the Kansas Territory, and therefore the lodges holding charters from the Grand Lodge of Nebraska were an infringement on the jurisdiction of the Grand Lodge of Kansas. The reality is that Nevada, Auraria, and Central City Lodges were all still under dispensation when the Masonic Convention of the Grand Lodge of Colorado was held, and therefore could not participate in its formation. Central City Lodge would never received a charter prior to severing from the Grand Lodge of Nebraska, whereas the other two would obtain charters before severing from Kansas and affiliating with the Grand Lodge of Colorado.

One other lodge had been formed in the Territory prior to the formation of the Grand Lodge, which is confusingly named Denver Lodge U.D. of Denver, on the opposite side of Cherry Creek from Auraria Lodge (which would later change its name to Denver Lodge No. 5). Denver Lodge U.D. received their dispensation in 1860 from the Grand Lodge of Kansas, however, they would relinquish their dispensation after only a few months and their membership would join with Auraria Lodge.

At the formation of the Grand Lodge, James Ewing was called to preside as the Worshipful Master with O. A. Whittemore as the Secretary. Customarily, the Master of the oldest lodge represented in the jurisdiction would preside, but Eli Carter of Golden City Lodge waived his right to preside, except to open the convention. The election of Grand Officers would elect John Chivington as the first Grand Master of Colorado Masons. The three lodges that formed the Grand Lodge would receive new charter numbers, thusly: Golden City Lodge No. 1, Summit Lodge No. 2, and Rocky Mountain Lodge No. 3.

The first Annual Communication of the Grand Lodge of Colorado was held four months later on 10–11 December 1861. John Chivington was elected once again to the office of Grand Master, though he would be absent throughout much of his first full term as Grand Master, with Andrew Mason, Deputy Grand Master, taking on the responsibilities of the Grand Master.

During the early history of the Grand Lodge of Colorado, many of the Grand Officers, both elected and appointed, were notable Colorado pioneers, and some of the prominent politicians and businessmen in the formation of the State of Colorado were Freemasons and Grand Lodge Officers. To name but a few: John Chivington, a Methodist minister, Union Army Colonel, and Grand Master in 1861; Allyn Weston, a banker, investor, and Grand Master in 1862; Henry M. Teller, a lawyer, the first Senator from Colorado, the 15th United States Secretary of the Interior, and Grand Master in 1863; Archibald van Deren, commissioner of Gilpin County, Colorado, and Grand Master in 1864; Andrew Mason, a miner, mining superintendent, Grand Master in 1865, and one of the proponents of the formation of the Grand Lodge of Utah; Webster D. Anthony, the private secretary of Territorial Governor John Evans, first Speaker of the House of the Colorado House of Representatives, and Grand Master in 1873-1874.

=== Recognition of Prince Hall ===
As early as 1897, the first attempts of any Grand Lodge in the United States to recognize Prince Hall Freemasonry would be made, but with much struggle. In 1897 the Grand Lodge of Washington would formally recognize Prince Hall, but with an overwhelming backlash from other Grand Lodges, Washington Masons opted to rescind their recognition of Prince Hall. Starting in 1972, the Grand Lodge of Wisconsin sought to form fraternal recognition with Prince Hall, but such was drawn out for many years. The Grand Lodge of Connecticut would be the first Masonic jurisdiction to recognize the legitimacy of Prince Hall in 1989. One month later, the Grand Lodge of Nebraska would recognize Prince Hall as well, granting full recognition of any Prince Hall Grand Lodge with fraternal relations with the M. W. Prince Hall Grand Lodge of Nebraska. In 1990, the Grand Lodge of Colorado started their own process of recognizing Prince Hall, and that same year the Grand Lodges of Wisconsin and Washington would recognize Prince Hall. At the Annual Communication of the Grand Lodge of Colorado in January 1990, Grand Master Dwight A. Hamilton recommended "mutual recognition and rights of visitation." The agreement between the Grand Lodges is in the form a "compact," a document which states the two Grand Lodges are sovereign and lawful, coexisting within the same territory, and that their members are permitted full rights of visitation to each others' lodges. The compact does not permit affiliation between the two jurisdictions.

On 19 October 2022, the M. W. Grand Lodge of Colorado, A.F.&A.M. and the M. W. Prince Hall Grand Lodge of Colorado and Its Jurisdiction, F.&A.M. would formally rededicate their compact in the Hall of the Colorado Supreme Court of the Colorado State Capitol, as a ceremonial public gesture of the two jurisdictions continuing their mutual recognition of each's sovereignty. The keynote speaker of the occasion was Wellington Webb, former Mayor of Denver and Thirty-Third Degree Scottish Rite Mason, Prince Hall affiliated.

== Lodges ==
=== Early Colorado Lodges ===
By the end of 1861, the charters of Nevada and Auraria Lodges had been returned the Grand Lodge of Kansas, as they would then recognize the sovereign authority of the Grand Lodge of Colorado, and that those lodges would then petition for charters from Colorado. Nevada Lodge No. 36 would become Nevada Lodge No. 4, and Auraria Lodge No. 37 would become Denver Lodge No. 5. It has long been a point of contention as to why Denver Lodge received the higher number, as it is the oldest lodge in the jurisdiction of Colorado, receiving dispensation in 1859 and holding their first official meeting on 1 October 1859. Auraria Lodge had previously unofficially met under the assumed name of "Arapahoe Lodge of F. & A. Masons" as early as April 23, 1859, though they did not have official dispensation to hold formal lodge meetings. Whereas Golden City Lodge held their first meeting on 21 January 1860 and Nevada Lodge held their first meeting on 22 December 1860. However, Golden City Lodge applied for their official charter and received it on 17 October 1860, a full year before Nevada or Auraria Lodge would apply for their charters. Auraria Lodge would also petition for a charter, but they had not submitted their annual returns, and had their charter withheld for a full year. Nevada Lodge received Lodge No. 36 only because Auraria Lodge had once again not submitted their annual returns by the time of the Annual Communication of the Grand Lodge of Kansas in 1861, but Richard Rees, Grand Master of Kansas Masons, advised that Auraria Lodge receive their charter upon receipt of their annual returns. Thus, when Nevada and Auraria Lodges petitioned the Grand Lodge of Colorado for charters, the Grand Lodge gave them their numbers in the order in which their charters where given.

Central City Lodge would relinquish their dispensation from the Grand Lodge of Nebraska and received a new dispensation from the Grand Lodge of Colorado as Central City Lodge on 30 September 1861. However, one week later on 5 October 1861, they would relinquish their dispensation and received a new dispensation under a new name: Chivington Lodge, in honor of Colorado's first Grand Master. Chivington Lodge would receive their charter as Lodge No. 6 on 19 December 1861. Chivington Lodge would change their name to Central Lodge No. 6 in 1868 with no commentary or explicitly stated reason for the name change by Grand Master Henry M. Teller, only a note in the annual returns of Chivington Lodge, though it would be presumed that the name change was the result of John Chivington's diminished reputation since 1864.

Rocky Mountain Lodge No. 3 would surrender its charter on 3 November 1862, and Summit Lodge No. 2 would do the same sometime in 1865, both due to the fact that their townships had become ghost towns.

There was a lodge formed in Denver in 1861 that had such a brief existence, that the only official record of its existence in the proceedings of the Grand Lodge of Colorado is a receipt of $15.00 "on dispensation King Solomon Lodge." However, there were several announcements for King Solomon Lodge U.D. published in the Rocky Mountain News and mentions of this lodge in the minute books of Denver Lodge No. 5. However, no other records survive of this lodge.

The last notable "early" Colorado lodge is Union Lodge No. 7. This lodge was formed at the behest of John Chivington and John Evans, as tensions between sympathizers with the Confederacy and the Federal government of the United States grew so strong within Denver Lodge, that it was deemed necessary to form a lodge for the Union supporters, and leave Denver Lodge to the Confederate supporters. On 30 November 1863, Union Lodge No. 7 was chartered without previous dispensation. In 1928, it was discovered that no records could be found which made Union Lodge a lawful lodge. The oldest living Grand Lodge officer was consulted, Chase Withrow, and asked if the formation of Union Lodge was lawful, who was a Grand Officer when the lodge was chartered, and he assured that everything was in order, and that was deemed sufficient.

=== Foreign Lodges ===
The Grand Lodge of Colorado would charter lodges in three other territories, and those lodges would go on to form the Grand Lodges under the Masonic jurisdiction they now belong to. Montana Lodge No. 9 in Virginia City, Montana would become Virginia City Lodge No. 1 and Helena Lodge No. 10 in Helena, Montana would become Helena Lodge No. 3. Both would be part of the formation of the Grand Lodge of Montana; Cheyenne Lodge No. 16 in Cheyenne, Wyoming (Cheyenne Lodge No. 1), Laramie Lodge No. 18 of Laramie, Wyoming (Laramie Lodge No. 3), and Evanston Lodge No. 24 of Evanston, Wyoming (Evanston Lodge No. 4) would help form the Grand Lodge of Wyoming; finally Argenta Lodge No. 21 of Salt Lake City (Argenta Lodge No. 3) would help form the Grand Lodge of Utah.

== Location ==
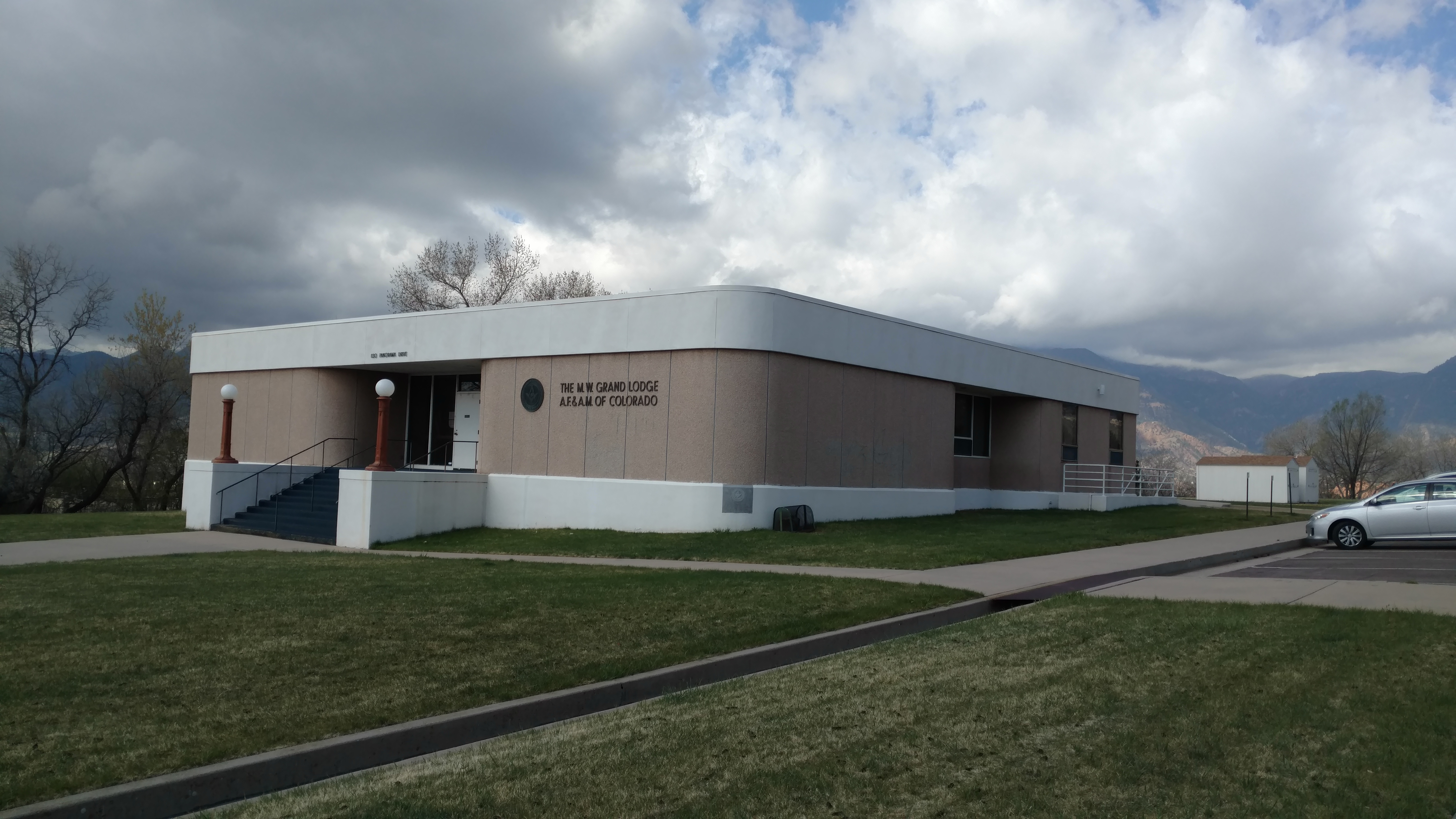
Grand Lodge of Colorado, Colorado Springs

For the first several years of the Grand Lodge's existence, the Grand Lodge convened at various locations. The Masonic convention to form the Grand Lodge was held at Golden City, presumably in a location being occupied by Golden City Lodge, the Loveland Gardens at 1107 Washington Avenue. The first Annual Communication in 1861 of the Grand Lodge was held in Denver, presumably at the place where Denver Lodge convened, which at the time was the A. J. Jacob's Store at 1361 Ferry Street (today 1361 11th Street). In 1862 the Grand Lodge met in Central City, which would have been the log cabin erected in 1859 at the current site of the granite monument previously mentioned. In 1863, the Grand Lodge once again met in Denver, and in 1864 they convened once again in Central City, and would alternate between the two locations until 1873, when the Grand Lodge began to regularly meet in Denver, where they met at the J. P. Fink Block at 15th and Market Streets.

The Fink Block would remain the location of the Grand Lodge until 1883, when Denver Lodge moved to City Hall at 14th and Larimer Street, and the Grand Lodge convened at this location until 1890, when Denver Masons finally built their own building at 16th and Welton Streets, where the Grand Lodge met until the 1970s. The current Grand Lodge office building, museum, and library was constructed in 1973. Ground was broken on 17 March 1973.

== Current Organization ==
Today the Grand Lodge of Colorado represents more than the individual Masonic lodges under its jurisdiction, as a number of nonprofit corporations and charities fall under its auspices. Among its charities, the Grand Lodge has a Benevolent Fund, controlled by a board of trustees that oversee financial assistance to any of its members who are in need of aid; there is also the Robert Russell Eastern Star Masonic Home located at 2445 S. Quebec Street, whose board of trustees previously were almost strictly Freemasons, but as of 2017 became an independent corporation with a few Masons still acting as representatives of the Grand Lodge to the board of trustees; and there is the Colorado Masonic Band Camp, which provides musical education to selected Colorado high school students at a summer camp. The Grand Lodge also has a Library and Museum Association, which curates a library and historically significant items and documents; a corporation of Colorado Masonic Properties, which handles any physical real estate that may come into possession of the Grand Lodge, such as for the management of Masonic markers and memorials in the State of Colorado. The Grand Lodge also provides scholarships to Colorado high school students who will be attending an in-state college.

== Notable Grand Masters ==
- John Chivington, 1861
- Henry M. Teller, 1863, 1867-1872
- Henry P. H. Bromwell, 1870 (Honorary Grand Master, Past Grand Master of the Grand Lodge Of Illinois, 1865)
- Roger W. Woodbury, 1878 (one of the founders of the Denver Public Library)
- Lawrence N. Greenleaf, 1880
