= Crossland Stadium =

Stadium at Wichita State University in Kansas, U.S.

Coordinates: 37°43′18.12″N 97°17′43.87″W

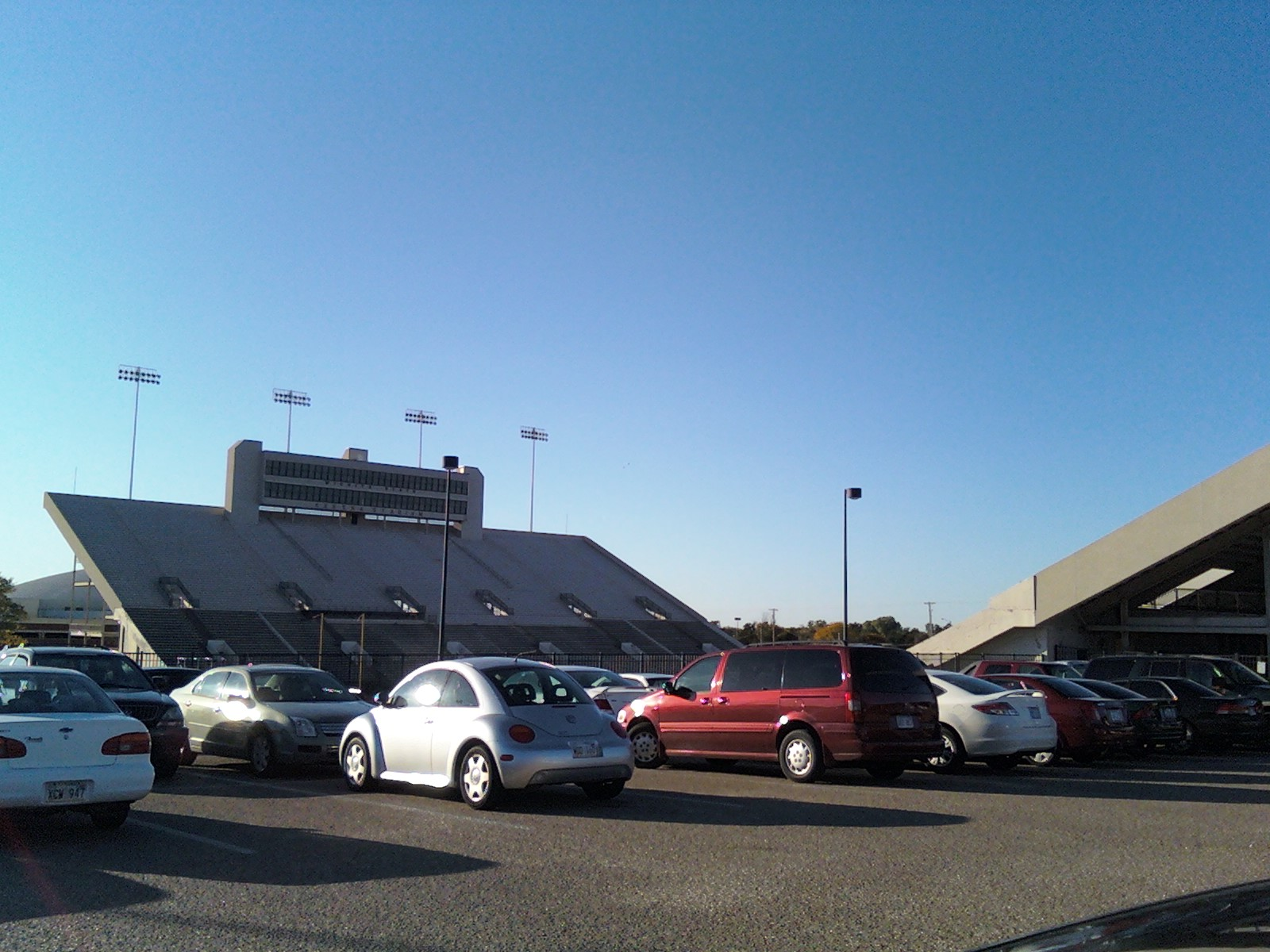
- Cessna Stadium in 2010
- Interactive map of Crossland Stadium
- Former names: Veterans Field (1946–1968)
- Location: 1845 E 21st Street N Wichita, Kansas 67260
- Owner: Wichita State University
- Operator: Wichita State University
- Capacity: 16,000 (1946–1968); 31,500 (1969–2002); 24,000 (2002–2023)
- Surface: Grass
- Record attendance: 30,518 (September 9, 1978 vs. Oklahoma State)

Construction
- Groundbreaking: January 6, 1941
- Opened: September 21, 1946
- Renovated: 1969, 1996, 2002
- Closed: June 5, 2023
- Demolished: Began June 6, 2023
- Cost: $100,000 $1,500,000 (1969) $1,800,000 (2002 renovation)

Tenants
- Wichita State Shockers (NCAA); Kapaun Mt. Carmel High School football

Crossland Stadium, previously known as Cessna Stadium, is a stadium on the campus of Wichita State University in Wichita, Kansas, United States. It opened in 1946 and served as the home of the football team until the program was discontinued in 1986. It is currently home of the Wichita State Shockers track and field team. The stadium is currently undergoing a rebuilding of the entire stadium, which will happen over three phases. As of May 2025, phase 1A reconstruction of the east side had been completed, which consisted of: demolition of old east bleachers, building new in-ground bleachers, and building a new restrooms & storage building. In June 2025, phase 1B was started to widen the track to 9 lanes, and was completed in early 2026.

== History ==
In the early days of Wichita State University, when it was known as Fairmount College, its first football field was located on the north side of 17th Street, immediately east of the current Henrion Hall, when it was the Henrion Gymnasium. In 1929, concrete bleachers were attached to the east side of the same building for football games.

In 1940, the school decided to build a new football stadium on the north side of campus at the current site on the south side of 21st Street. On January 6, 1941, ground was broken for Veterans Field, and by September 1942 the bowl was excavated, foundations were poured for the west stands, and a quarter of the west bleachers were completed; however, construction was halted due to metal shortages during World War II. After the war ended, the bleachers were constructed in sections over time as funds were incrementally available. By mid-1946, stands were completed to a point where 6,000 seats were ready by the start of the 1946 football season. Veterans Field was finally completed before the start of the 1948 football season, with 15,000 seats and facilities for the press, concessions stands, and locker rooms. It was dedicated on November 25, 1948, during a football game with the University of Nevada. The stadium was dedicated to the members of the armed forces from Sedgwick County who served in World War II.

In 1967, Wichita State started considering the expansion of Veterans Field. In 1968, faculty and students voted and approved the expansion by adding on top of the existing stands of Veterans Field. Cessna Aircraft Company pledged a donation of $300,000 for the proposed stadium, and it was renamed to Cessna Stadium. The cost of the expansion was $1.5 Million, and the school had a fund drive to raise the remaining money. Construction was started on February 7, 1969, and completed in September. It was one of the most modern and complete football facilities in the nation at the time of its completion.

Wichita State University rededicated the facility on April 16, 2002, to mark the end of the seven-month, $1.3 million construction that included adding an eighth lane and resurfacing the track, reconfiguring the infield event layout, and building separate locker rooms for the Shocker men's and women's track and field teams, and a reduction of overall seating capacity. The first event in the renovated facility was WSU's annual K. T. Woodman Track and Field Classic.

On April 15, 2020, the Kansas Board of Regents approved demolition of the stadium, citing the high cost of repairs needed. The demolition of the east bleacher began on June 6, 2023. The stadium will be demolished in several phases and will be replaced with a track specific stadium which as of 2024 will be known as University Stadium. Phase 1B is projected to be completed in April 2026. Phase 2 will start in June 2026 by the demolition of the west grandstand. That year, the naming rights went to Crossland Construction Company.

=== Football ===
The Wichita State Shockers football team was an NCAA Division I football program. The Shockers fielded a team from 1897 to 1986. They played home games at Cessna Stadium and were members of the Missouri Valley Conference when the program was discontinued in 1986.

Cessna was the location of a Pittsburg State-Mesa State Division II college football game. The stadium has also played host to numerous Kansas State High School Football Championship games, including the Kansas Shrine Bowl, Kansas's high school all-star football game and high school football games from nearby Kapaun Mt. Carmel High School.

== Usage ==
=== Track and field ===
Wichita State Shockers track and field used the facility until 2020. It has hosted several Missouri Valley Conference Championships and hosted the 2019 American Athletic Conference Outdoor Track and Field Championships.

Since 1970 (except 1978 and 2020), it is home to the Kansas state high school track and field meet, an event that brings all Kansas high school qualifiers to one location.

In April of each year until the demolition was approved, Cessna Stadium is the venue for the K. T. Woodman Invitational, a track and field meet for high schools, junior colleges, and many top collegiate track programs of the Midwest.

=== Football ===
Cessna Stadium was used by Kapaun Mount Carmel High School of the Greater Wichita Athletic League as its home field for varsity football games through 2018. Other high school games were played at Cessna Stadium from time to time.

=== Public ===
Cessna Stadium was open to the public for recreational use Monday through Friday from 6:30 a.m. to 5:30 p.m. It was closed on holidays and during WSU track & field practices and special events. In April 2017, WSU changed their policy to require a $100 deposit to get a key to use their facilities.

== Notable concerts ==
- October 1, 2006 - The Rolling Stones for A Bigger Bang Tour.

== See also ==
Other sports facilities on WSU campus:

- Charles Koch Arena (basketball and volleyball) - located west of Cessna Stadium (next door)
- Eck Stadium (baseball) - located about 0.4 mile east of Cessna Stadium
