= Nevadaville Masonic Temple =

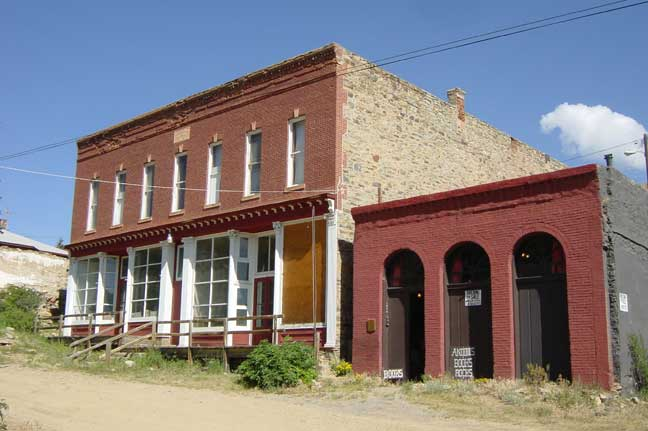
- Nevadaville Masonic Temple
- Interactive map of the Nevadaville Masonic Temple area

General information
- Architectural style: Old West, Neo-Classical
- Location: 1043 Nevadaville Road, Nevadaville, Colorado, United States
- Coordinates: 39°47′45″N 105°32′4″W
- Elevation: 9050 ft (2760 m) above mean sea level
- Current tenants: Nevada Lodge No. 4 A.F. & A.M.
- Completed: 1861

Technical details
- Structural system: Load-bearing masonry, cast-iron storefront

Design and construction
- Main contractor: M. S. Burhans

The Nevadaville Masonic Temple is the Masonic lodge building in the ghost town of Nevadaville, Colorado, just outside of Central City, Colorado.

== History ==
The building has served and continues to serve one lodge of Freemasons, that of Nevada Lodge No. 4 A.F. & A.M. The lodge was founded by several Masons, with Andrew Mason, one of the early settlers of the American Midwest in search of gold, serving as the lodge's first Worshipful Master. Nevada Lodge No. 4 was originally granted dispensation as Nevada Lodge U.D. (also called Nevada Lodge No. 36) in the Kansas Territory by the Grand Lodge of Kansas on December 22, 1860. When the Kansas Territory became the Colorado Territory in 1861, the Grand Lodge of Colorado was formed, and chartered Nevada Lodge No. 4 by Rev. John Chivington, the first Grand Master of Colorado Masons.

The lodge originally met in an upper room of the Ira H. Morton building in Nevadaville (then called Nevada City) until the town burned in September 1861. Following this the lodge purchased two lots on Main Street (now Nevadaville Road) to build their new building. The entire building cost $7,140, and is credited to M. S. Burhans as the contractor. They also purchased the lot of the former lodge building, which then housed the Order of Red Men. The ground floor of the new Masonic Hall had rental space for shops (such as a meat market and a barbershop), and the upper story contains the 22 foot by 45 foot lodge room along with the Tiler's room and preparation room; the remainder of the second floor was for offices and sleeping quarters. The exterior is primarily load-bearing stone, with a cast-iron storefront.

After the turn of the century the population of Nevadaville began to decline, owing to a gold boom in Leadville, Colorado and elsewhere. Nevadaville practically became a ghost town during World War II. The Nevada Lodge No. 4 ceased using the building, and began to meet in the Central City Masonic Hall, which was final by July 1942. In June 1965 the brethren of Nevada Lodge No. 4 entertained the idea of holding regular lodge meetings once again in the building in Nevadaville, with the purpose of raising funds for restoring the building. The Nevadaville Masonic Temple is still actively used by the lodge members, who continue to restore the building.

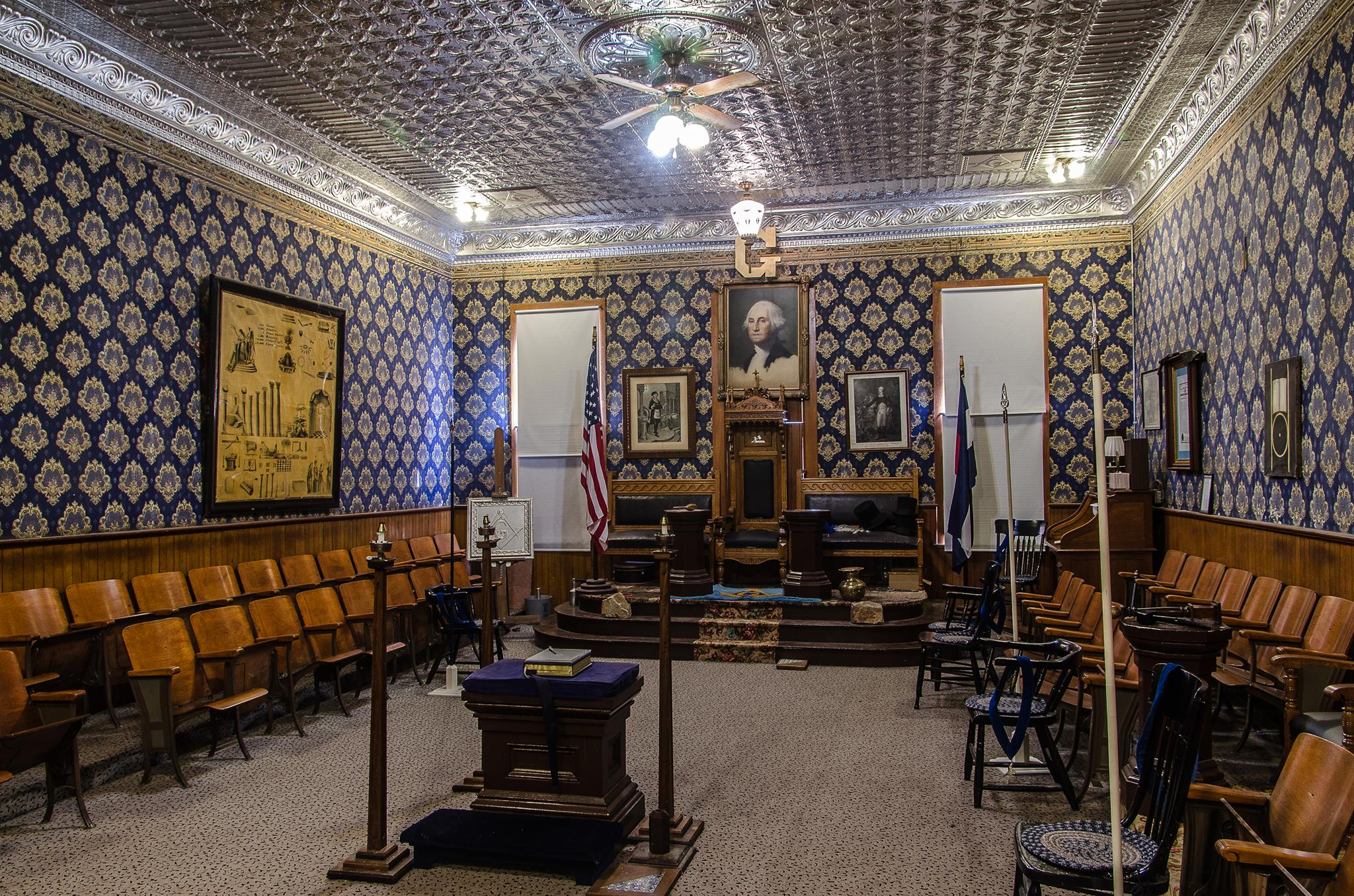
The lodge room of the Nevadaville Masonic Temple.
