= Lawrence N. Greenleaf =

American poet

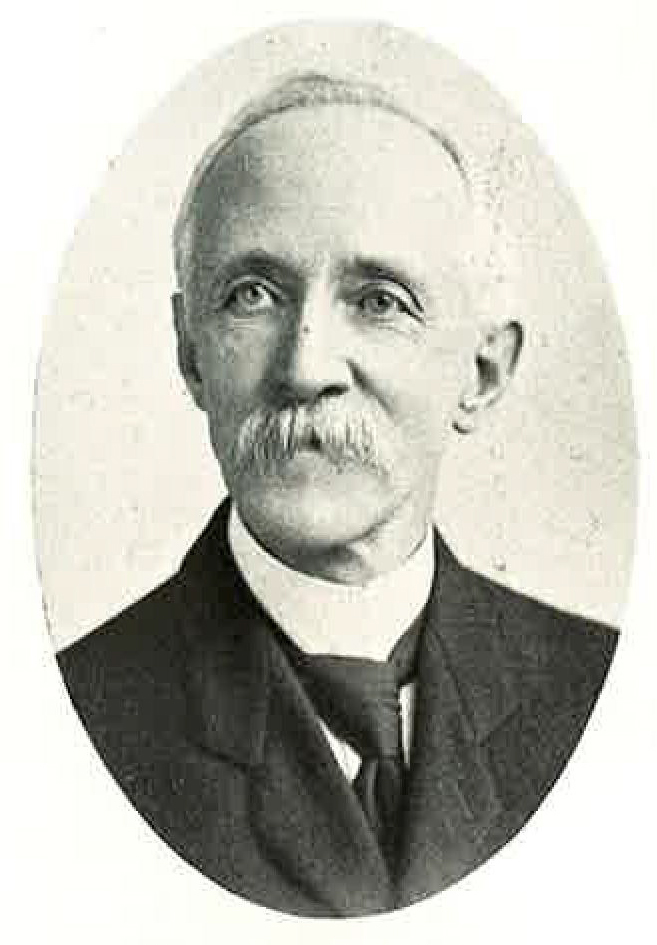
- Lawrence N. Greenleaf circa 1880
- Born: Lawrence Nichols Greenleaf; October 4, 1838; Boston, Massachusetts, U.S.
- Died: October 25, 1922 (aged 84); Denver, Colorado, U.S.
- Resting place: Block 1, Lot 59, Fairmount Cemetery (Denver, Colorado), U.S.
- Other name: Peter Punever
- Occupations: Entrepreneur; poet; publisher
- Spouse: Jennie Sophia Hammon (married March 30, 1869)
- Children: Gardner Greenleaf, Eugene L. Greenleaf, and Rebecca Jane Greenleaf Lewis

Signature
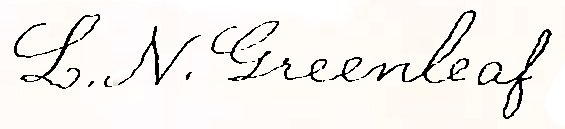

Lawrence Nichols Greenleaf (October 4, 1838 – October 25, 1922) was an early pioneer of Colorado. He was an entrepreneur, newspaper correspondent, comedian, poet, publisher, and Past Grand Master of Colorado Masons. He is best remembered for his poetry, especially his "The Lodge Room Over Simpkins’ Store". He has been called "poet laureate of Freemasonry" and "Pioneer Poet".

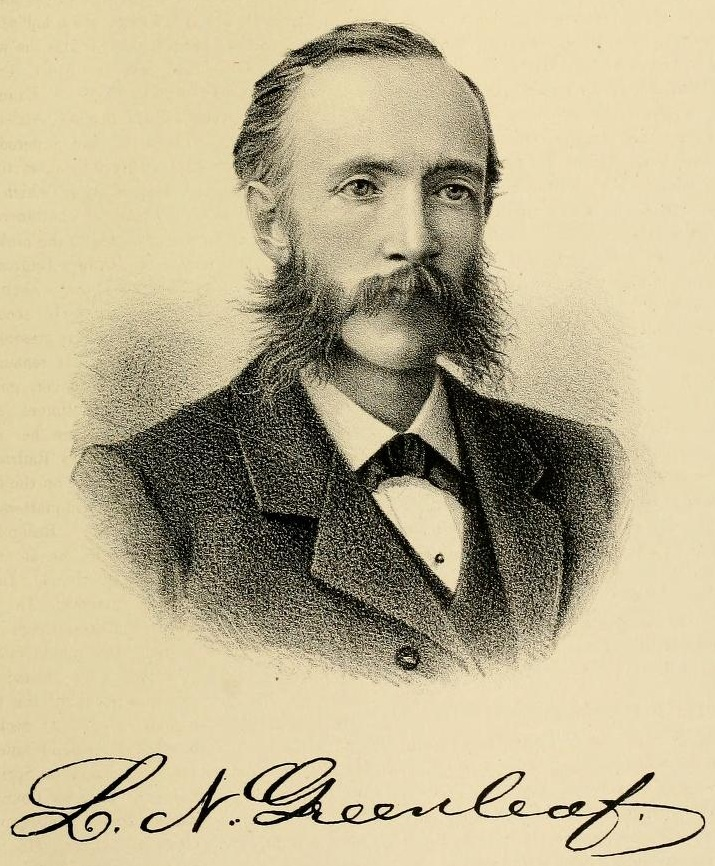
Portrait of Greenleaf circa 1860

== Biography ==
=== Early life and pioneer ===
Greenleaf was born in Boston, Massachusetts, on October 4, 1838, to Gardner Greenleaf of New England and Rebecca J. Caldwell of Nova Scotia. He received his education in the Boston public schools, graduating in 1855 from the English High School. After completing his education he worked in a wholesale importing house for four years. Working in an emporium would later contribute to his entrepreneurial spirit and knowledge.

At the start of the Pike's Peak Gold Rush in 1859, Greenleaf partnered with Gardner G. Brewer to start a mercantile business in what was then Kansas Territory. On April 11, 1860, the partners left Boston and traveled to Chicago, Illinois, then went down to St. Louis, Missouri, then up the Mississippi River on a steamboat to Hannibal, Missouri. From there they traveled by train to St. Joseph, Missouri, where they joined the “Brad Pease” Party on April 28, and after twenty-six days they arrived in Denver, Colorado, on May 24. Once in Denver, the partners purchased a team of mules, a wagon, groceries, and mining supplies and headed for California Gulch, today known as Leadville, Colorado, via Colorado Springs, Colorado (then known as Colorado City) and Ute Pass—a very treacherous route, but the only way of getting to California Gulch. Having made a considerable profit, the two men returned to Denver to start a mercantile store called Greenleaf & Brewer, Co.

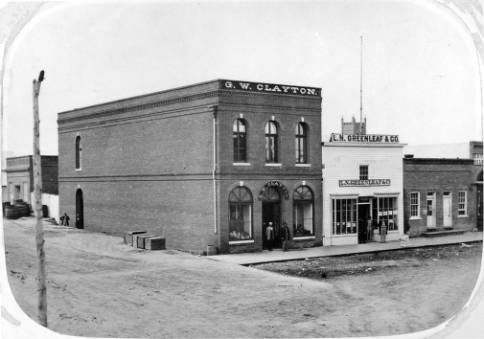
Greenleaf & Brewer, Co. store (center) circa 1860

They built the first two-story brick building on Larimer Street in Denver, the block on which the building once stood is now called Larimer Square. The store originally carried only groceries and liquor, but starting in 1863 they began to transform their store into a toys and fancy goods shop. This may have been at the encouragement of Brewer, who formerly had worked in his father's fancy goods shop in Boston. Brewer, like Greenleaf, was a Freemason, a member of Denver Lodge No. 5 A.F. & A.M., and was Past Master of that lodge from 1870 to 1872. The two men would work together for thirty years.

=== Personal life ===
On March 30, 1869, Greenleaf married Jennie Sophia Hammon in Denver. Jennie was born in Boston and was the daughter of Lorenzo R. Hammond of Massachusetts. She traveled to Denver the same year as Greenleaf, 1860, with her mother and stepfather, Martin and Sophia Rollins, both originally from Illinois. Just as her husband was highly active in Masonic organizations, so too was Jennie. She was one of the founding members of the Social Order of the Beauceant, served as its vice president in 1893, and as president in 1894.

Lawrence and Jennie Greenleaf had three children together. Their first child, Gardner, was born on February 6, 1871, and who later moved to Chicago. Their second child, Eugene Lawrence Greenleaf, born on August 19, 1875, went on to become a continentally renowned magician and stage artist. Eugene primarily lived in Chicago and traveled with the Redpath Lyceum Bureau and the Chautauqua Circuit. Just as his father wrote under a pen name, so too did Eugene work under a stage name: Eugene Laurant. Their third child, Rebecca Jane, born in 1877, married a Salt Lake City merchant, Don Rose Lewis.

=== Political career ===
Greenleaf was also heavily ambitious in holding public office. He was a stalwart Democrat, which may have been a contributing factor to his departure from a very Republican New England. In 1865 he ran on the Democratic ticket for Superintendent of Public Instruction, and was a judge for the First Ward in the Denver City Election of 1866. He served on the Board of Education of Denver School District No. 1 from 1885 until 1891, as well as several committees. He and his family were also attendants of their Episcopal Church.

=== Death and legacy ===
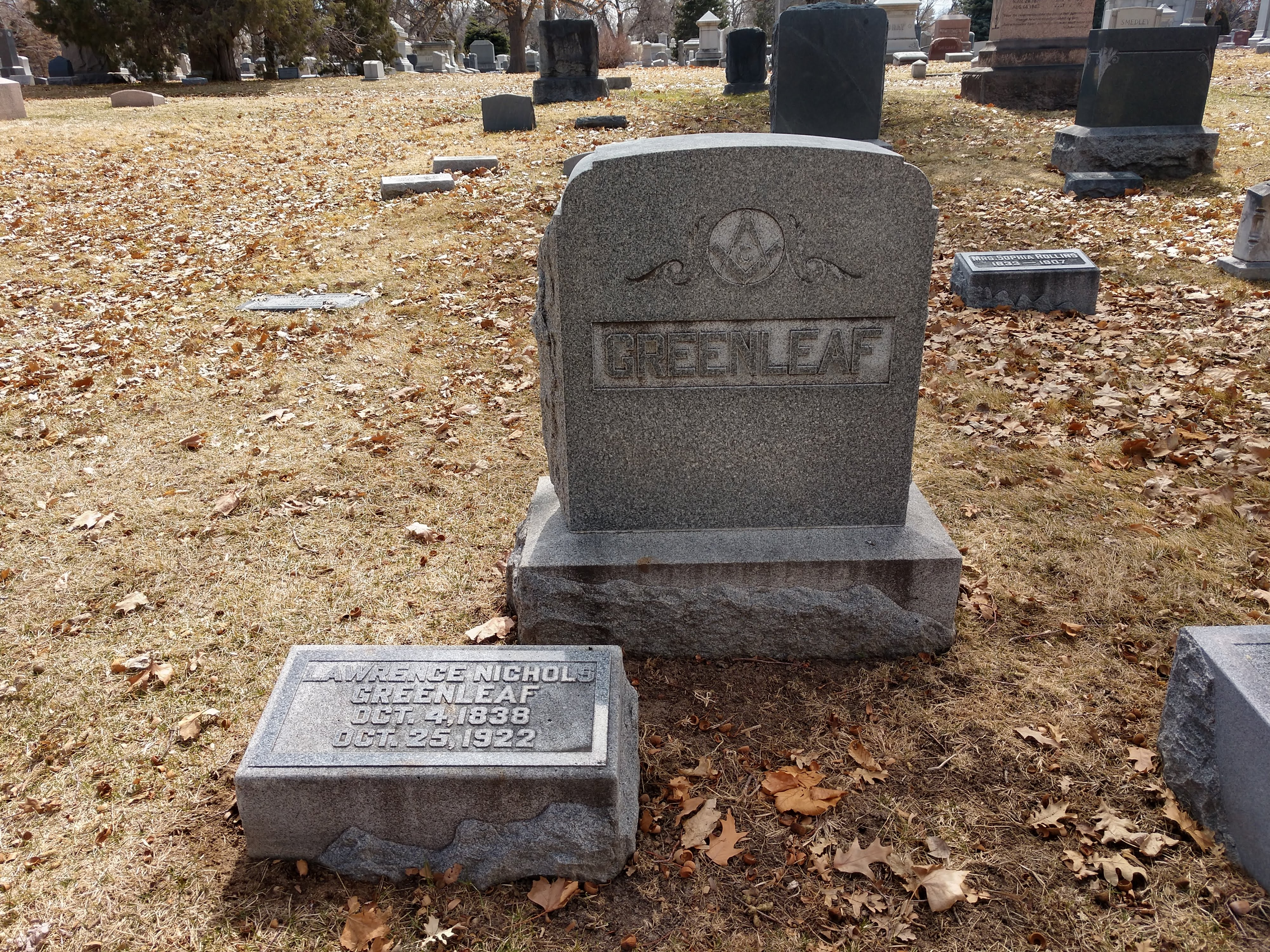
Gravesite of Lawrence N. Greenleaf, Fairmount Cemetery, Denver

Lawrence N. Greenleaf died on October 25, 1922. He is buried in Fairmount Cemetery (Denver, Colorado).

Five years after his death, in 1927, a new lodge was chartered in the Cherry Creek neighborhood of Denver, which bears his name: Lawrence N. Greenleaf Lodge No. 169 A.F. & A.M.

== Freemasonry ==
Greenleaf was a highly active Freemason. Why Greenleaf became a Mason is uncertain. What is known is that on November 30, 1860, a man named Patrick Waters killed a Freemason named Thomas R. Freeman, and then fled to Nebraska. Another Mason captured Waters and brought him back to Denver. Several Denver Masons paid for lawyers, a judge, and court venue to conduct a trial. Waters was found guilty and executed by hanging on December 21, 1860. Greenleaf was one of the men on the jury. It is believed Greenleaf was so impressed by the way the Freemasons handled the situation and sought justice that he desired to become a member. However, Greenleaf did not become a Mason for another three years, nor was he initiated into the Masonic fraternity in Colorado.

Greenleaf was initiated an Entered Apprentice, passed to a Fellowcraft, and raised a Master Mason on the same day by special dispensation at Columbian Lodge in Boston on November 21, 1863. For what reasons he had returned to Boston is unknown. Eight months later he traveled back to Colorado, demitted from Columbian Lodge and affiliated with Denver Lodge No. 5 A.F. & A.M.

He was elected Worshipful Master of Denver Lodge No. 5 five times and served as Grand Master of the Grand Lodge of Colorado in 1880. He was an Excellent High Priest of Royal Arch Masons and served as Grand High Priest in 1885. He was close friends with Albert Mackey, who anointed Greenleaf in the Order of High Priesthood. He was also close friends with Henry P. H. Bromwell, who, along with George Lounsbery and Greenleaf, helped charter the Grand Council of High Priesthood in Colorado in 1887, of which Greenleaf served as president for thirty-five years. He was made a Knight Templar in Boston in 1868, as well as a Scottish Rite Mason. He received his 33rd Degree in Washington, D.C., on October 30, 1880, and in 1883 was commissioned to be Deputy Inspector General of Scottish Rite Masonry in Colorado by Henry M. Teller. He was also good friends with Albert Pike, and Robert Freke Gould.

== Literary career ==
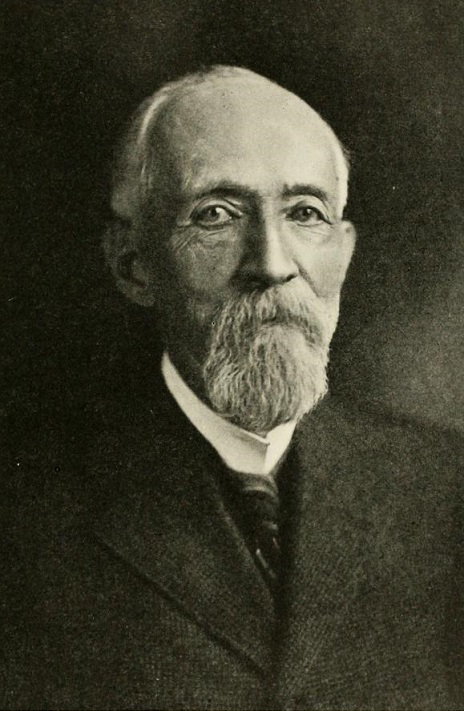
Portrait of Greenleaf in 1918

Just after high school Greenleaf began to publicly try his hand at poetry. The first known instance of Greenleaf publicly presenting a poem was on May 13, 1857, at the Tremont Temple Baptist Church in Boston. He delivered a poem called "Art" before the Lowell Literary Association. The poem received mixed reviews from the Boston Evening Traveller, the Daily Bee, and the Boston Herald. Nonetheless, he was invited back the next year to deliver a poem called "Columbus" about Christopher Columbus. The poem "Columbus" was included in his published collection of poetry King Sham and Other Atrocities.

Greenleaf earned the title of "Pioneer Poet" in December 1860. At the first meeting of the Literary and Historical Society of Denver on December 12, 1860, Greenleaf was invited by the Lecturer, Dr. W. H. Farner, to deliver a poem. The very next day the Rocky Mountain News had the following to say concerning the poem:

It was of an humorous character, abounding in keen satire and well devised puns, and produced repeated rounds of applause from those present. Mr. G. possesses rare poetic talent, and may in time become no insignificant rival of the renowned [John] Saxe.

The poem was so well received that Greenleaf was invited back to the next meeting in January 1861 to deliver the same poem.

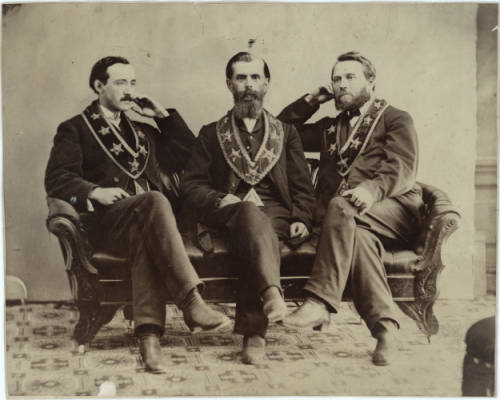
Edward H. Collins (left), Lawrence N. Greenleaf (center), and William N. Byers (right) in Masonic regalia circa 1870

Over the years Greenleaf would publish poems in the Rocky Mountain News, as well as witty jokes and comical correspondences. The publisher of Rocky Mountain News, William Byers, was a close friend of Greenleaf's. Like many of Greenleaf's associations and friendships, Byers was a Freemason and a Past Master of Denver Lodge No. 5 A.F. & A.M in 1876. Byers permitted Greenleaf to publish in the newspaper his satirical and comical writings, which he did under the nom de plume Peter Punever. As Punever, Greenleaf shows off his wit and humor, usually in the form of puns. The Punever jokes were very popular, and gained him the epithet of "the undaunted and the inspired Pike's Peak punster".

The satirical writings, poems, and jokes of Greenleaf, as both himself and as Peter Punever, led him to publish a collection of his poems in a book entitled King Sham and Other Atrocities in Verse; Including a Humorous History of the Pike's Peak Excitement (New York: Hurd and Houghton). It was Greenleaf's only published book. The book is composed of two parts: “King Sham,” which is the collection of his comical poems, most of which had been previously published in the Rocky Mountain News; the second part is composed of “Serious and Occasional Pieces.” A few of the serious poems had been previous published in the newspaper, such as "Shades and Gleams", but most were previously unpublished or had only ever been presented at literary association events.

The poem "King Sham" is one of the most popular of the poems in King Sham. It is an incredibly pessimistic and satirical poem that, first, illustrates a fantasy world call the Kingdom of Humbug, which is ruled over by King Sham. Everything in this fantasy world is cheap, fake, and coerced. Next Greenleaf reveals that this fantasy is, in fact, reality: "Society's a sham, beyond a doubt." This poem was very popular unto itself. It was first presented on March 26, 1862, at the People's Theater as part of a benefit performance. He continued to present the poem from March through August 1862. He then took the poem on tour to the various isolated mining camps throughout the Territory of Colorado, which was most likely the first entertainment tour in the Rocky Mountains.

As Greenleaf's popularity grew, he was invited to more and more occasions and events to deliver original poems. Some of the most notable occasions include the Fourth of July Celebration of 1865, the Pioneer's Celebration on July 4, 1866, the Saint John the Baptist Day Masonic Celebration on June 24, 1867, and the Centennial Celebration in 1876.

Greenleaf's ambitions eventually went beyond merely writing for a friend's newspaper and writing extensive reports for the Grand Lodge of Colorado. In 1893 he purchased the Square and Compass magazine. As publisher and editor of a Masonic magazine, he was finally provided the platform on which to regularly disseminate more of his written works and drive his agendas for Freemasonry.

== Books on Lawrence N. Greenleaf ==
- Lawrence N. Greenleaf: Pioneer Poet of Colorado, Volume I: The Poetry. Ed. Patrick M. Dey. Denver, Colorado: House 12 Underbelly. 2023. ISBN 979-8218178109. (A compilation of the collected poetry of Greenleaf, including a biography and annotations to his poems).
- Lawrence N. Greenleaf: Pioneer Poet of Colorado, Volume II: The Writings. Ed. Patrick M. Dey. Colorado Springs, Colorado: House 12 Underbelly. 2024. ISBN 979-8218526443. (A compilation of the collected writings of Greenleaf).
