= Henrietta Bromwell =

American artist (1859–1946)

Henrietta E. Bromwell
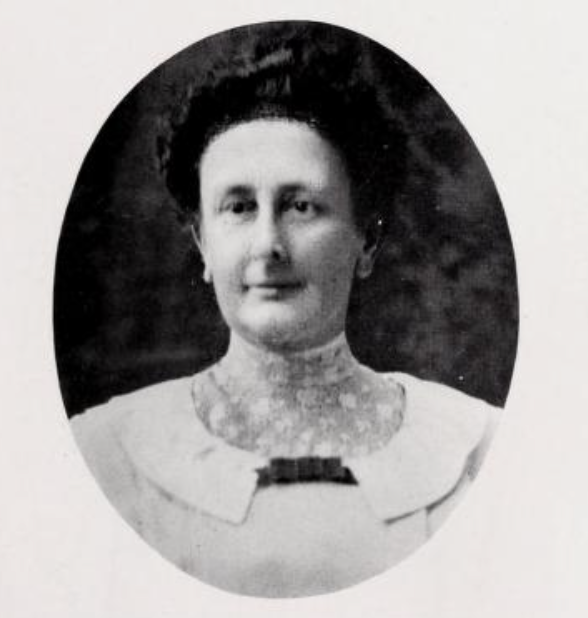
- Henrietta E, Bromwell, Representative Women of Colorado, 1914
- Born: Henrietta Elizabeth Bromwell; July 13, 1859; Charleston, Illinois
- Died: January 8, 1946 (aged 86); Denver, Colorado
- Other name: Nettie Bromwell
- Education: University of Denver
- Occupations: Artist, writer, publisher, genealogist
- Parents: Elizabeth Payne; Henry Pelham Holmes Bromwell

Henrietta Bromwell (1859–1946) was an artist, author, and a socialite from Denver. She is known for her landscape paintings and literature. She was a co-founder of the Artists' Club of Denver, which led to the founding of the Denver Art Museum. She taught oil and watercolor painting in downtown Denver and was an organizer and jurist at local art exhibitions. Bromwell was a genealogist, with multiple volume publications, and a publisher of her and her father's works.

== Early life and education ==
Henrietta Elizabeth Bromwell, nicknamed Nettie, was born in Charleston, Illinois on July 13, 1859. Her parents were Elizabeth Payne and Henry Pelham Holmes Bromwell. She had a younger brother Henry. Her mother died in January 1865. The Bromwells moved to Colorado Territory in 1870, and lived near South Platte River near wooded land. He was a legislator, including championing women's right to vote, a jurist, and a mason, writing Restorations of Masonic Geometry and Symbolry.

Bromwell was taught by private tutors. Her brother died at age 19 in 1881, while studying to become a lawyer. In 1885, Bromwell began studying art at the University of Denver. Her coursework included study of composition, sketching in and outdoors, work with color, and charcoal. She received a degree in 1886. She spent summers at Mt. Manitou and similar places and while home she created works of art at Cherry Creek Bottoms, West Denver and Arlington, now called Auraria.

== Artist ==
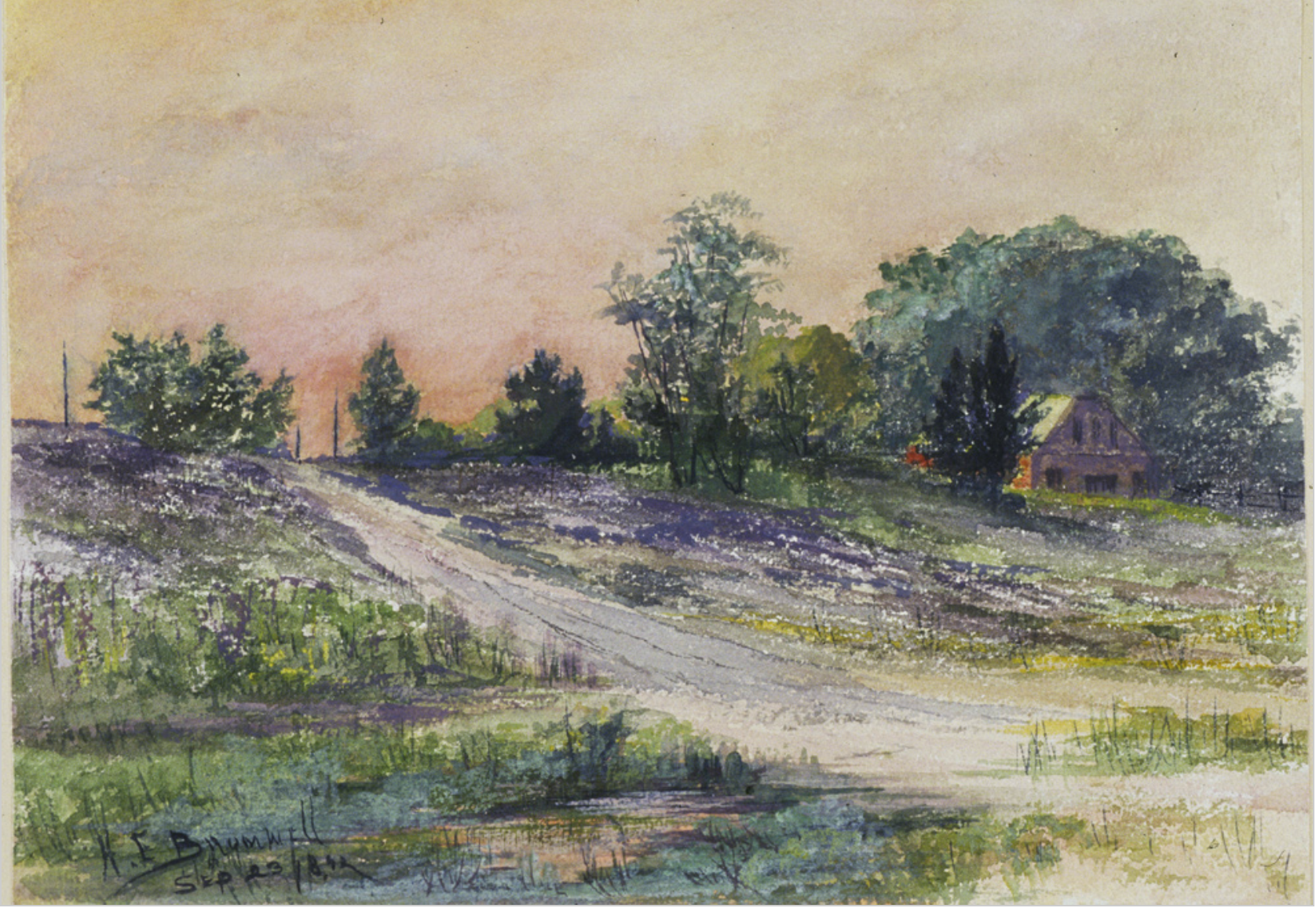
Hillside with Purple Flowers, Henrietta Bromwell, 1892, History Colorado

Inspired by European landscape artists and Francis Cropsey and George Henry Durrie, American artists, Bromwell was an artist from 1885 to 1930. She often worked en plein air and used pen and ink, watercolor, and oil paints. She started with scenic landscape paintings of the mountains, and daily scenes about work on farms, including farmhouses, barns, hay stacks. Over the years, she lightened the color palette and added shadows of purple and blue. She became freer with brushstrokes and added industrial landscapes to her repertoire.

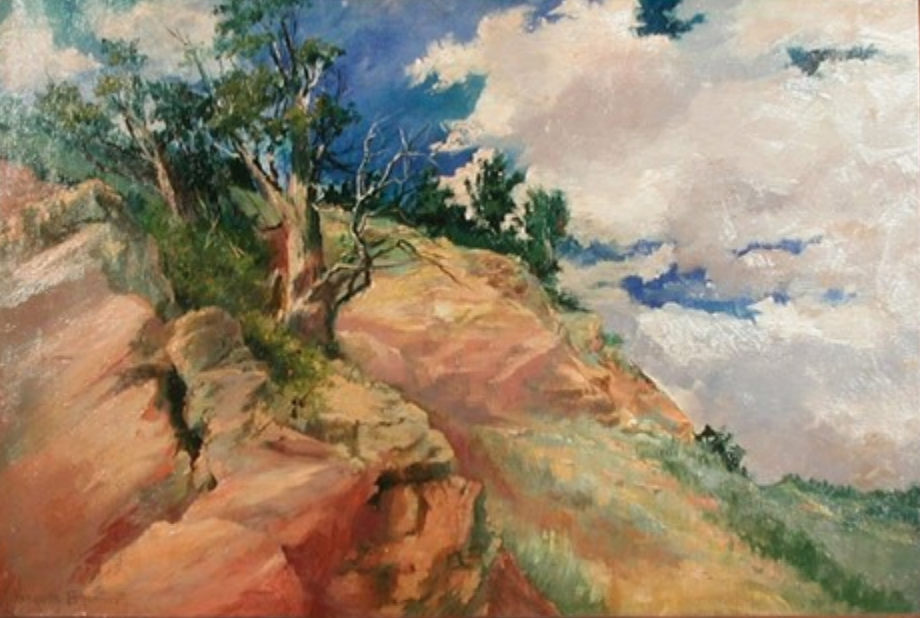
Untitled, called Rock Place and Juniper picture, Henrietta Bromwell, 1885–1895, History of Colorado

Bromwell developed a style that was ahead of its time, with a still-fresh palette, capturing realistic scenery, rather than poetic scenery of the time.

Even before [Robert] Henri and the Ashcan painters back East, Bromwell was painting smokestacks and clotheslines hung with laundry.

— Katherine Smith-Warren, art historian and curator

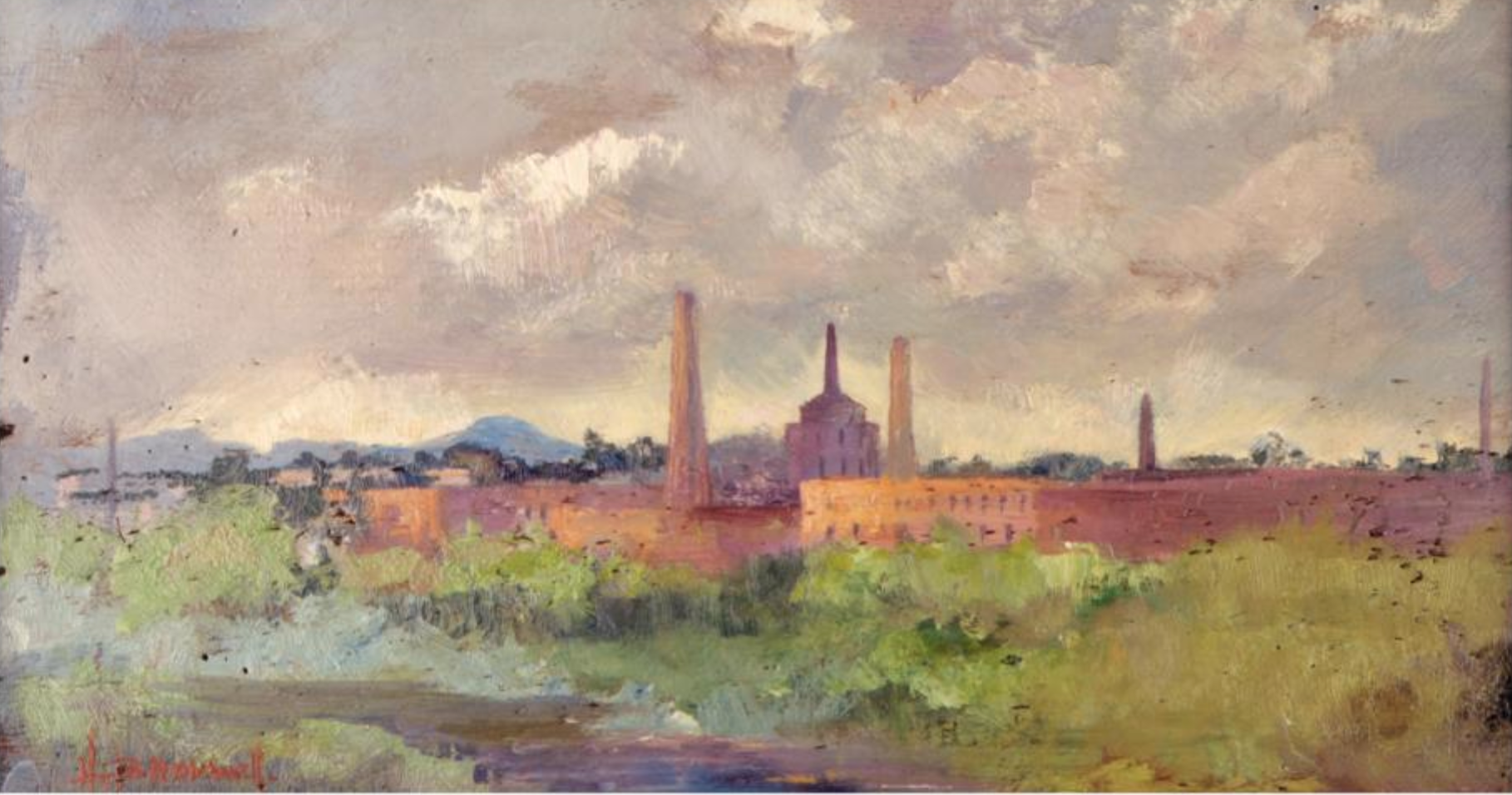
A Bit in Denver Bottom, Henrietta Bromwell, 1890–1910, History Colorado

She and Anne Evans, daughter of territorial governor John Evans, established the Artists' Club of Denver. It later became the Denver Art Museum. Bromwell organized shows and catalogs, was a jurist, and performed other administrative functions for the club.

Her work was exhibited in Chicago, Philadelphia, and New York City in 1897. Charles Partridge Adams, a member of the Artists' Club, and Bromwell exhibited at the Trans-Mississippi Exposition in Omaha in 1898. She taught watercolor and oil painting at the Majestic Building in downtown Denver. She wrote "Sketching and Painting from Nature", referring to Claude Monet's work. It was published in The Western Club Woman in January 1899. She participated in annual exhibits of the club until 1903. She took a break from the Denver art scene for a number of years. In 1922, she completed a sketch book of pencil drawings of Colorado scenes.

== Publisher ==
She founded the Henry Bromwell Masonic Publishing Company, so that she could publish the book on masonry that her father worked on over a number of years. After she published the book, she toured Masonic lodges across the country to sell the book from 1905 to 1907.

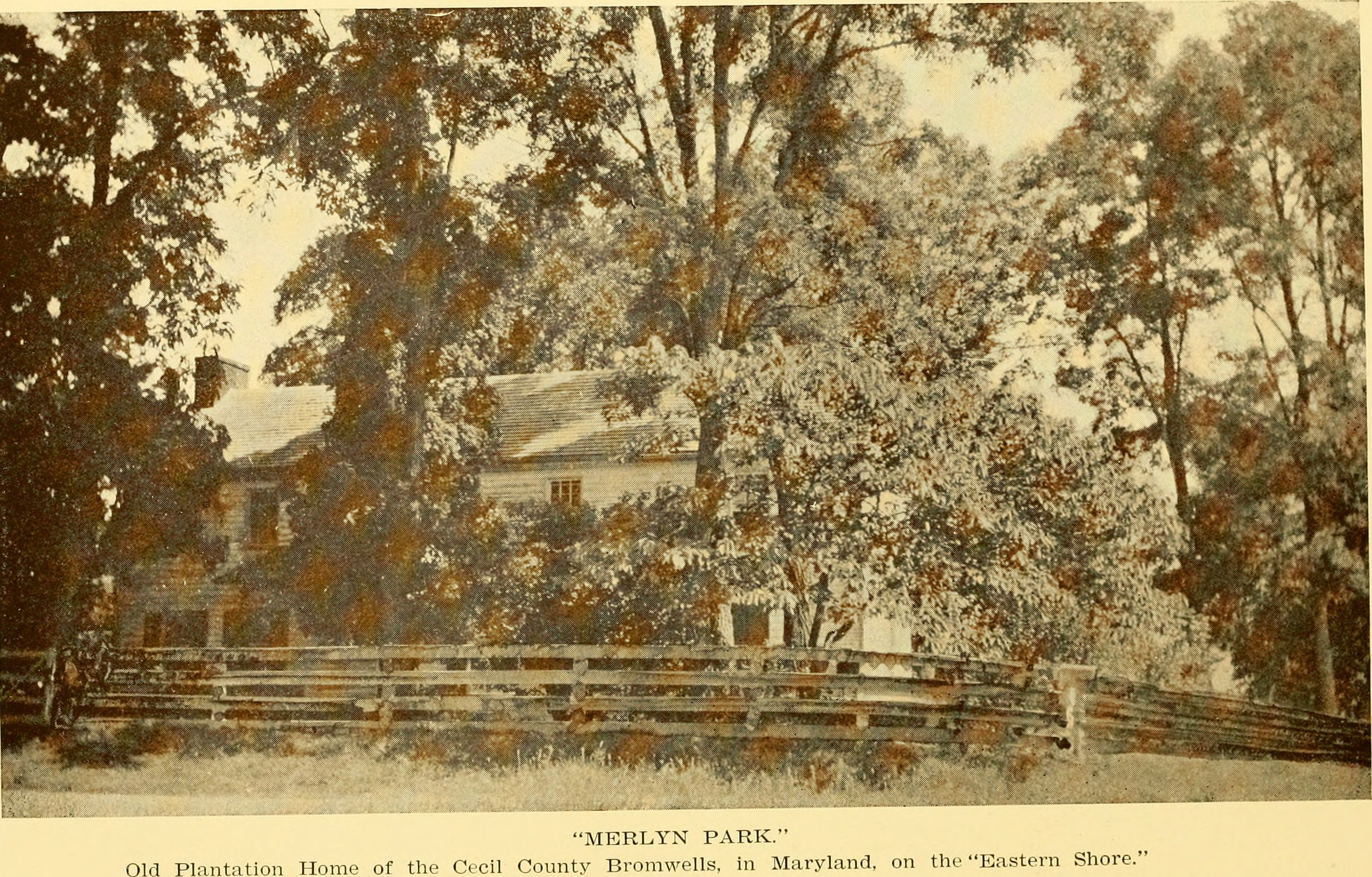
Merlyn Park, Old Plantation House, Eastern Shore, Maryland. Published in The Bromwell genealogy - including descendants of William Bromwell and Beulah Hall with data relating to others of the Bromwell name in America (1910) by Henrietta Bromwell

She published her father's poetry and three genealogy books. She published Colorado Portrait and Biographical Index, in five volumes.

Her publications include:

- The Bromwell Genealogy (1910)
- Head Lines of the Bromwell Family in England (1913–1914)
- Fifty-niners’ Directory- Colorado Argonauts of 1858–1859, 2 volumes. (1926)
- Colorado Portrait and Biography Index, 5 volumes. (1933)

== Personal life ==
Bromwell lived with her father, whose health declined in his later years. She was his caretaker until his death at their home on January 3, 1903.

She was a member of Territorial Daughters of Colorado, the Maryland Historical Society, and the Daughters of the American Revolution.

In her later years, she donated books, works of art, and other collections to the Denver Public Library and in 1938 to the Colorado Historical Society, now History Colorado. Over the years, she collected Native American artifacts, family photograph albums, scrapbooks, musical instruments and other items that she donated for posterity. She died on January 8, 1946, and was buried near her father at Riverside Cemetery in Denver.

Her papers, most notably her genealogical research papers and publications, are among the collection of the Western History / Genealogy Department of the Denver Public Library. Organized by family surnames, the papers include newspaper clippings and obituaries, correspondence, and other papers from her research. The Decorative and Fine Arts Departments of the Colorado Historical Society (History Colorado) hold a number of Henrietta Bromwell's paintings.

== Posthumous exhibitions ==
Her work was exhibited in 2000 as part of the Time and Place: One Hundred Years of Women Artists in Colorado 1900–2000 at the Metro State Center for the Visual Arts. A catalogue was created for the show and the exhibition was followed up with educational tours. Her work represented the first decade of artists, from 1900 to 1910. Eight of her works were shown, including Church in Moonlight, Autumn Day, Wash and Bridge, and Small Denver Scene Near South Platte.

In 2011, her work was included in an exhibition entitled Home Lands: How Women Made the West that included works by Georgia O'Keeffe, Maria Martinez, Virna Haffer, and Laura Gilpin.
