= Martha Maxwell =

American naturalist, artist and taxidermist

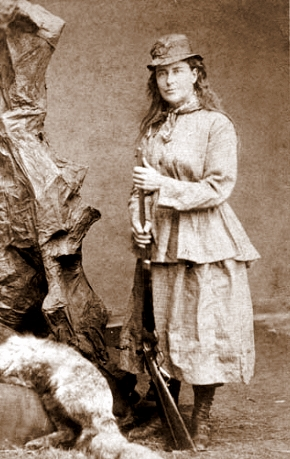
- Born: July 21, 1831; Tioga County, Pennsylvania
- Died: May 31, 1881 (aged 49); Rockaway Beach, Queens, New York
- Known for: Creating modern taxidermy methods

Martha Ann Maxwell (née Dartt 21 July 1831 – 31 May 1881) was an American naturalist, artist and taxidermist. She helped found modern taxidermy. Maxwell's pioneering diorama displays are said to have influenced major figures in taxidermy history who entered the field later, such as William Temple Hornaday and Carl Akeley (the father of modern taxidermy). She was born in Pennsylvania in 1831. Among her many accomplishments, she is credited with being the first woman field naturalist to obtain and prepare her own specimens. She was inducted into the Colorado Women's Hall of Fame in 1985.

== Biography ==
=== Early life ===
Maxwell was born Martha Dartt to Spencer and Amy Sanford Dartt on 21 July 1831 in Tioga County, Pennsylvania. Her father died in 1833 and her mother remarried in 1841 to Josiah Dartt, Spencer's first cousin. It was her grandmother, Abigail Stanford, who first instilled a love of nature in Maxwell, taking her for walks in the woods. In 1851 Maxwell left for Oberlin College in Ohio with plans to become a teacher. She had to drop out in 1852 due to her family being unable to afford the tuition. She returned to her parents, who were then living in Baraboo, Wisconsin.

=== Marriage and children ===
Maxwell was teaching at a local school when James Maxwell, a Baraboo businessman, hired her in 1853 to chaperone two of his children at Lawrence College in Wisconsin. In return for her services, he agreed to cover her tuition. She had been there less than a year when James proposed to her. Despite him being twenty years older, with six children, Maxwell agreed. They were married in 1854 and had a daughter, Mabel, in 1857.

=== Interest in taxidermy ===
The Maxwell family was hit with financial ruin in the panic of 1857. As a result of this, Maxwell and James joined the Colorado Gold Rush of 1860. They left their daughter Mabel behind in the care of her maternal grandparents. The Maxwells eventually settled in Nevadaville, Colorado. While James pursued mining, Maxwell took in washing, mending and baked pies to earn her own income. She made her own investments, and bought an interest in a boarding house, some mining claims, and she purchased a one-room log cabin on the plains east of Denver.

In 1861 the boarding house burned down, leaving Maxwell with no way to earn an income and the family no place to live. The plan was to move to the cabin that Maxwell had bought but when they got there, they found that a claim jumper had moved into the cabin. They took the squatter to court, and the decision came down in favor of the Maxwells but the German man living in their cabin refused to move out. Maxwell waited for the man to leave the cabin on an errand. She removed the door from the frame and she entered the cabin and found amongst the man's possessions perfectly preserved stuffed birds and animals. The claim jumper was a taxidermist by training. Maxwell proceeded to put everything out on the prairie and reclaim her property. Maxwell soon wrote to family members requesting a book that would help her “to learn how to preserve birds & other animal curiosities in this country.”

In 1862 Maxwell returned to Baraboo, where she studied taxidermy, taught by a local man named Ogden. In 1868 James persuaded her to return to Colorado.

=== Career in taxidermy ===
Upon Maxwell's return to Colorado she began building a collection of native birds and mammals. She made trips into the Rockies where she gathered chipmunks, various species of squirrels and birds. By the fall of 1868 Martha had prepared almost 100 specimens, ranging from chicks to hawks, and hummingbirds to eagles. She was asked to display her work at the Colorado Agricultural Society exhibition. Attendees particularly admired that Maxwell created an entire natural habitat for each species, making it appear as if they were still alive. Her work was acknowledged with a $50 prize and a diploma.

In mid-1874, she opened her Rocky Mountain Museum in Boulder, Colorado at the northeast corner of Broadway and Pearl Street to display her specimens for both education and entertainment. A central part of the museum was Maxwell's exhibits of animals in their natural habitats, including a buffalo, birds, a bear, and a mountain lion. In addition, she included "comic groups" of animals, such as a small group of monkeys seated around a table playing poker, and live animals - two bear cubs, rattlesnakes, a mountain grouse, and squirrels.

Hoping to find more support in a larger city, Maxwell moved her museum to Denver a little more than a year later. However she was unable to make the venture profitable. Altogether she collected many birds and mammals including black footed ferrets which had been described by John James Audubon but never seen by scientists, and the Megascops asio maxwelliae (Mrs. Maxwell's Owl), a subspecies of Eastern screech owl named in her honor by ornithologist Robert Ridgway of the Smithsonian Institution. By then she was also a regular correspondent of Spencer Fullerton Baird. Maxwell sent him two bird specimens in 1874 and he in turn supplied her with catalogs of birds and mammals.

=== Developed taxidermy techniques ===
Maxwell is unique in that she independently modernized taxidermy by creating wooden or metal armatures onto which plaster could be built up to resemble the specimen's body, and then covering these bases with the animals' skins. Prior to this, traditional methods of taxidermy involved "stuffing" skins with hay, rags, or sawdust and sewing the skins together, with results that were often misshapen. Similar to Maxwell's developments in taxidermy techniques, examples of "modern taxidermy" would appear in the 1880s, after Maxwell's death.

The techniques Maxwell developed in taxidermy led to more "naturalistic" looking specimens, that were arranged with other taxidermied or living animals to create a narrative (such as predator and prey) as well as plants and natural materials. This combination of animals, plants, and hand-crafted setting (such as papier-mâché rocks) created the illusion that the specimen were in their natural habitat, a precursor for habitat dioramas found in museums decades later.

=== Philadelphia Exposition ===
In 1876 Maxwell was asked to produce an exhibit for the Philadelphia Centennial Exhibition, the first official World's Fair. The Colorado commissioners agreed to pay for the packing and transportation of her specimens to and from Philadelphia and her living expenses while at the Centennial. To compensate Maxwell for her time, she would be allowed to keep the proceeds from the sale of any duplicate specimens and photographs of herself and her display. She created a complex habitat diorama that included taxidermy animals (that she had both hunted and mounted), running water, and some live prairie dogs. It is speculated this display was the first of its kind. The display was one of the most popular at the internationally attended event and was heavily covered by the press. The exhibition proved so popular that the fair's official photographic firm, the Centennial Photographic Company, was unable to keep up with the demand for images. When Maxwell had photographic copies of their images made and began selling them, however, officials forced her to stop.

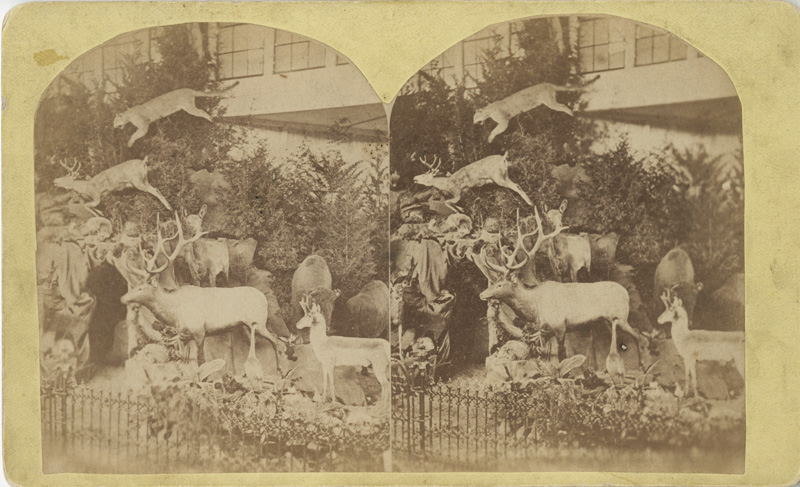
Stereograph of Rocky Mountain display, Philadelphia Centennial Exhibition, Centennial Photographic Company

Many Centennial visitors apparently wanted a keepsake of Maxwell's popular display. Maxwell had arranged mammals and birds from both the plains and mountain regions into a realistic natural setting. Buffalo and elk roamed across the plains while bears, mountain lions and smaller creatures were posed among the rocks, each at an elevation suggesting the altitude in which they were naturally found. Like her Colorado museum displays, Maxwell's Centennial exhibition featured both taxidermy specimens and small live animals.

=== Financial struggles ===
In the years following the Centennial, Martha Maxwell continued to struggle financially. Other exhibitions of her specimens, including one in Washington, D.C. in 1876, failed to garner much attention. In 1879, Maxwell moved to rooms in the Williamsburg section of Brooklyn, New York and in 1880, opened a beachhouse/museum in Rockaway Beach, offering bathing as well as a display of her collection.

=== On the Plains, and Among the Peaks ===
After the Centennial, Maxwell worked with her half-sister Mary Dartt to publish an account of Maxwell's taxidermy work. On the Plains, and Among the Peaks; or, How Mrs. Maxwell Made Her Natural History Collection was published in 1879 by the Philadelphia firm of Claxton, Remsen and Haffelfinger. Although the book received positive reviews, it was not a financial success.

=== Death and afterward ===
Maxwell died in Rockaway Beach, Queens, New York on 31 May 1881 of an ovarian tumor.

After Maxwell's death her daughter contracted with J.P. Haskins in Saratoga Springs, New York to exhibit and/or sell the collection. The collection was exhibited several times but was then placed into storage. Unfortunately it was not put away carefully and pieces began to disintegrate. In 1920 Maxwell's sister, Mary, tried to retrieve the collection and planned to donate work to the University of Colorado. However, the pieces had aged badly and there was nothing worth preserving. Some of the animal specimens Maxwell collected still exist in the collections of scientific institutions, including the Bell Museum.

== Bibliography ==
- Bateman, Vanessa (2024). "Martha Maxwell on the Frontier of Colorado, Modern Taxidermy and 'Women's Work"' in Gender and Animals in History: Yearbook of Women's History 42 (edited by Sandra Swart). Amsterdam University Press. ISBN 9789048565283.
- Benson, Maxine (1986). Martha Maxwell, Rocky Mountain naturalist. Lincoln: University of Nebraska Press. ISBN 0803261551.
- Bonta, Marcia (1995). American Women Afield: Writings by Pioneering Women Naturalists. College Station: Texas A & M University. ISBN 0890966346.
- Dartt, Mary (2021). On the Plains, and Among the Peaks; or, How Mrs. Maxwell Made Her Natural History Collection. Ed. Julie McCown. Louisville, CO: University Press of Colorado. ISBN 9781646421961
- Oakes, Elizabeth (2007). Encyclopedia of World Scientists. New York: Facts on File. ISBN 978-1438118826.
- https://paconservationheritage.org/stories/martha-maxwell/
