= Kansas Shrine Bowl =

- Kansas Shrine Bowl All-Star Football Game
- Stadium: Varies around the state of Kansas
- Location: State of Kansas (varies between East and West)
- Previous stadiums: Bill Snyder Family Football Stadium, Memorial Stadium, Cessna Stadium
- Previous locations: Lawrence, Manhattan, Wichita, KS
- Operated: 1974–present
- Payout: US$$50,000 annually

Sponsors
- Some major sponsors include: Mammoth Sports Construction; Champion sportswear; Blue Cross and Blue Shield of Kansas; Shriners Hospitals for Children

The Kansas Shrine Bowl is an annual charity football game benefiting Shriners Children's for Kansas high school seniors, organized by the Shrine Bowl of Kansas, Inc., a 501(c)(3) non-profit. The Shrine Bowl involves members of the five Shrine temples in Kansas. The game is held on a college campus in Kansas, which gets bid out every year.

== History ==
Since 1974, the Kansas Shrine Bowl established the East vs. West high school football game in Kansas. Cities in which the Shrine Bowl has been played in include Hays, Lawrence, Emporia, Manhattan, Topeka, Wichita, Pittsburg, and Dodge City. In December 2024, the Kansas Shrine Bowl announced a three-year partnership with Emporia State University, where it'll play host to the Kansas Shrine Bowl from 2026 to 2028. The Kansas Shrine Bowl has donated nearly $4 million to Shriners Children's since its establishment in 1974.

== Shrine Bowl week ==
Football participants in the Kansas Shrine Bowl football game report for camp eight days before the game, with West team reporting on the west side of the state and the East team reporting on the East side of the state. The East team practices at AdventHealth Field at Ottawa University, in Ottawa, and the West team practices at Gowans Stadium at Hutchinson Community College in Hutchinson.

The results are below:

Date	Winning team		Losing team		Location
June 15, 1974	East	16	West	14	Memorial Stadium (Kansas)
June 14, 1975	West	3	East	0	Bill Snyder Family Football Stadium (K-State)
June 12, 1976	West	28	East	24	Cessna Stadium (Wichita State)
June 11, 1977	West	35	East	14	Memorial Stadium
June 10, 1978	East	34	West	0	Bill Snyder Family Football Stadium
August 11, 1979	West	24	East	22	Cessna Stadium
June 14, 1980	West	30	East	15	Memorial Stadium (Kansas)
June 13, 1981	West	34	East	7	Bill Snyder Family Football Stadium
August 7, 1982	East	12	West	7	Cessna Stadium
August 6, 1983	East	16	West	9	Memorial Stadium (Kansas)
August 4, 1984	West	24	East	19	Bill Snyder Family Football Stadium
August 3, 1985	East	26	West	6	Cessna Stadium
August 2, 1986	West	42	East	40	Memorial Stadium (Kansas)
August 1, 1987	West	14	East	7	Bill Snyder Family Football Stadium
August 6, 1988	East	31	West	27	Yager Stadium at Moore Bowl (Washburn)
August 5, 1989	West	31	East	0	Cessna Stadium
August 4, 1990	West	32	East	0	Haskell Memorial Stadium (Haskell Indian Nations)
August 3, 1991	West	44	East	29	Bill Snyder Family Football Stadium
August 1, 1992	East	25	West	21	Yager Stadium
August 7, 1993	East	26	West	22	Cessna Stadium
August 6, 1994	West	18	East	15	Memorial Stadium (Kansas)
July 29, 1995	West	24	East	7	Bill Snyder Family Football Stadium
August 3, 1996	East	13	West	7	Yager Stadium
July 26, 1997	West	21	East	17	Lewis Field Stadium (Fort Hays State)
July 25, 1998	East	22	West	11	Francis G. Welch Stadium (Emporia State)
July 30, 1999	West	28	East	21	Cessna Stadium
July 29, 2000	East	21	West	14	Yager Stadium
July 28, 2001	East	12	West	12	Bill Snyder Family Football Stadium
July 27, 2002	West	27	East	13	Carnie Smith Stadium (Pittsburg State)
July 26, 2003	West	35	East	2	Cessna Stadium
July 31, 2004	East	29	West	12	Francis G. Welch Stadium
July 30, 2005	East	17	West	10	Bill Snyder Family Football Stadium
July 29, 2006	West	10	East	9	Carnie Smith Stadium
July 28, 2007	West	26	East	7	Lewis Field Stadium
July 26, 2008	West	29	East	28	Francis G. Welch Stadium
July 25, 2009	West	14	East	7	Cessna Stadium
July 31, 2010	West	45	East	29	Carnie Smith Stadium
July 30, 2011	West	30	East	7	Lewis Field Stadium
July 28, 2012	West	14	East	7	Francis G. Welch Stadium
July 27, 2013	East	22	West	19	Yager Stadium
July 26, 2014	West	21	East	6	Carnie Smith Stadium
July 25, 2015	East	21	West	0	Lewis Field Stadium
July 30, 2016	East	48	West	27	Francis G. Welch Stadium
July 29, 2017	West	22	East	21	Veterans Stadium (Butler CC)
July 28, 2018	East	21	West	14	Carnie Smith Stadium
June 8, 2019	West	26	East	7	Memorial Stadium (Dodge City CC)
July 18, 2020	West	14	East	9	Hummer Sports Complex
June 26, 2021	West	14	East	0	Gowans Stadium (Hutchinson CC)
July 23, 2022	West	10	East	10	Carnie Smith Stadium
July 15, 2023	West	21	East	20	Lewis Field Stadium
June 29, 2024	East	36	West	25	Francis G. Welch Stadium
June 21, 2025	West	26	East	8	Memorial Stadium (Dodge City)
June 27, 2026	East	14	West	7	Francis G. Welch Stadium
June 26, 2027	East	0	West	0	Francis G. Welch Stadium
West leads overall series					31–19–1 (.618)

The 2020 Kansas Shrine Bowl was to be held on Saturday, July 18, 2020 in Topeka, at Yager Stadium, however due to the COVID-19 pandemic, Washburn announced it wouldn’t accept outside events on campus. The Shrine Bowl announced it’d look for an alternate site.

== Events ==
=== Kansas Masonic All-State Marching Band ===
Established in 1984, the Kansas Masonic All-State Marching Band is a week-long camp that the Tuesday through Saturday of Shrine Bowl Week, and performs during the Kansas Shrine Bowl parade, and the all-star football game.

The camp is held wherever the football game is being played at that year, and the camp makes up anywhere from 180 to 250 of high school musicians. Local masonic lodges and other masonic appendant bodies sponsor the students to attend camp. The Kansas Masonic Foundation, who’s majority of donors are Kansas freemasons, was in charge of the camp from 1984 until 2019 before turning it over to the Kansas Shrine Bowl.

=== All-Star Cheer Camp ===
The Kansas Shrine Bowl All-Star Cheer Camp is held during the Wednesday through Saturday of Shrine Bowl week. The clinic consists of males and females from Kansas high schools.

=== KWCA Kansas Shrine Duals ===
In December 2023, the Kansas Shrine Bowl announced a new event, the Kansas Shrine Duals, in partnership with the Kansas Wrestling Coaches Association. Similar to the football game, Shrine Duals will be an east vs. west wrestling match held at Newman University, Wichita.
