= Henry P. H. Bromwell =

American politician and Freemason (1823–1903)

The Honourable Henry P. H. Bromwell
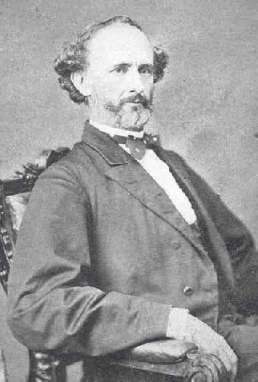
- Henry P.H. Bromwell
- Born: August 26, 1823; Baltimore, Maryland, U.S.
- Died: January 9, 1903 (aged 79); Denver, Colorado, U.S.
- Resting place: Riverside Cemetery (Denver, Colorado)
- Monuments: Bromwell Elementary School
- Education: McKendree College (Hon.)
- Occupations: Lawyer, Judge, Politician
- Notable work: The Song of the Wahbeek Restorations of Masonic Geometry and Symbolry (both published posthumous)
- Political party: Republican till 1880s, then Democrat
- Spouse: Elizebeth Emily Payne Bromwell (1837–1865)
- Children: Henrietta Elizabeth Bromwell (1859-1946); Henry Pelham Bromwell (1862–1881); Emma M. Bromwell (1864–1865)
- Parent(s): Henry Broughton Bromwell, Henrietta Holms

Henry Pelham Holmes Bromwell (August 26, 1823 – January 9, 1903) was an American lawyer, politician from Illinois, and prominent Freemason. He was a lawyer and judge who served as a U.S. representative from Illinois from 1865–1869 and continued to practice law when he moved to Colorado in 1870 where he was appointed to compile the state's statutes. Bromwell was initiated into freemasonry in 1854, and he became the Grand Master of Illinois in 1864. When he moved to Colorado he became that state's first Honorary Grand Master. He developed the Free and Accepted Architects, a new rite for Freemasonry which sought to teach its initiates the lost work of the craft embodied in Bromwell's Geometrical system. After his death, the Grand Lodge of Colorado published his work on the esoteric nature of Sacred geometry in the book Restorations of Masonic Geometry and Symbolry.

== Family and education ==
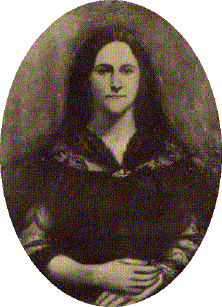
Bromwell's wife, Elizabeth Emily Payne Bromwell (1837–1865) "She was the most beautiful and gifted woman, and during their brief married life they were very happy." Oil painting done by George Wright in 1864

Born in Baltimore, Maryland, Bromwell moved with his parents to Cincinnati, Ohio, in 1824, and thence to Cumberland County, Illinois, in 1836. He attended private schools in Ohio and Illinois, including Marshall Academy (Marshall, Illinois), becoming an instructor in that academy in 1844. In 1867 he obtained an honorary degree of Master of Arts from McKendree College for his wide reputation for scholarship.

On June 20, 1858, Bromwell married Emily E. Payne. They had three children together, Emma M. Bromwell (1864–1865), Henry Pelham Payne Bromwell (1862–1881), and Henrietta Elizabeth Bromwell (1859–1946). Emma died around the same time as his wife in February 1865. Henry Jr. caught typhoid fever and died in Denver at the age of nineteen; he was studying law at the time.

After twenty years fighting sickness, Bromwell died in Denver, Colorado, January 9, 1903. He was interred in Riverside Cemetery.

== Law and politics ==
In 1848 the family moved to Vandalia, Illinois, where Bromwell worked for his father's newspaper, The Age of Steam, and studied law. Bromwell was admitted to the bar in 1853 and practiced in Vandalia until 1858. Soon after being admitted to the bar, he was elected County Judge of Fayette County, Illinois as well as ex-officio chairman of the County Board and charged with rebuilding the courthouse. While practicing law in Vandalia, Bromwell was "a member of the same bar as Mr. Lincoln, Politically of the same faith, he and the Judge [Bromwell] were naturally warm friends." In 1860 Bromwell was elected as a Presidential Elector for Lincoln. He moved to Charleston, Illinois, in 1857. Bromwell was elected as a Republican to the Thirty-ninth and Fortieth Congresses (March 4, 1865 – March 3, 1869).

In October–November 1870 Bromwell moved to Colorado Territory, arriving on November 10, where he was elected as a member of the territorial legislature in 1873–1874, "the highest legislative body of the territory." In 1875, he was elected as a member of the state's constitutional convention and in 1878 he was elected to the first Legislature of the State of Colorado serving in the House of Representatives, and appointed Commissioner to revise the laws of the state in 1881.

== Freemasonry ==
Bromwell was made a Freemason in Vandalia, Illinois, in 1854. He was a member of Temperance Lodge No. 16, where he served as Worshipful Master from 1856–1857. When he moved to Charleston he joined Charleston Lodge No. 35, where he served as Worshipful Master from 1858–1863, as well as serving as Grand Orator for the Grand Lodge of Illinois. He later was chosen as Grand Master for the Grand Lodge of Illinois in 1864 or 1865 (reports vary).

After moving to Colorado in 1870, he formally joined Denver Lodge #5 in 1874. That same year he served as Grand Orator of the Grand Lodge of Colorado. During the 1889 Grand Lodge annual communication he was unanimously elected as honorary member of the Grand Lodge of Colorado 1889 "in consideration of his distinguished services to the Craft" as well as "a slight evidence of our appreciation of and regard for his high masonic and personal character." This was the first time that someone was nominated as an honorary member of the Grand Lodge of Colorado, and he would remain the only honorary member up to the time of his death in 1903. This motion was proposed because "[Bromwell] does not need this honor to add to his fame as a wise and good mason, but because we honor ourselves in honoring him".

On January 11, 1903, the Grand Lodge of Colorado conducted the funeral service for Bromwell with Past Grand Master Lawrence Greenleaf acting as Grand Master. Among his pall bearers were eight Past Grand Masters, and the religious services were conducted at his residence.

== Free and Accepted Architects ==
Bromwell was the originator of the Free and Accepted Architects, a new branch of freemasonry "the object of which was to restore and preserve the lost work [rituals] of the ancient craft." The Rite itself has been described as "Bromwell surrounded by a few brethren interested in his geometrical system" The rite was "based on a geometrical system evolved in 1859" by Bromwell which contained the "most valuable information which should not be issued except through a series of degrees." The original rite consisted of two degrees, known as "Select Architects" and "Most Excellent Architect"; on May 26, 1875, the "Royal Architects" degree was added. These degrees were not innovations introduced into freemasonry but rather "designed to impart to students of the Craft a knowledge of Masonic symbolism not otherwise obtainable."

On March 1, 1862, a grand lodge of Free and Accepted Architects was formed, "known as King Davids Grand Lodge F.&A.A." The Grand Lodge moved to Denver in 1879, the first meeting in the new location being on June 9 of that year. In the twenty-one years of the Grand Lodge's existence there were nine Grand Master Architects and five lodges mentioned in their minutes: King David's No. 1 Charleston Illinois; King Solomon's No. 2 Washington D.C.; King Hiram's No. 3 Springfield Ill.; Hillsborow No. 4 Hillsboro, Ill.; Pentalpha No. 5 Denver, Col.; with a dispensation issued to Triangle, Los Angeles, Cal. The Grand Lodge continued until 1883, when it held its last meeting on March 6.

After the last Grand Lodge meeting Frank Church, the Grand Master Architect, continued obligating people into the rite. Several attempts were made to revive the lodge, but they all ended up in failure. Finally Harry Bundy, the Grand Secretary of Colorado, gained access to the rite and on December 29, 1958, Bundy obligated several individuals and opened the Grand Lodge of Architects. At this meeting they elected George B. Clark as Grand Master Architect and Harry W. Bundy as the Grand secretary. Afterwards they agreed to meet in Washington D.C. to elect the remaining officers. On February 20, 1959, the Grand Lodge of Architects met, elected a total of fifteen officers, and then turned the ritual over to the Allied Masonic Degrees and placed it in the custody of the Grand College of Rites; "there would be no initiations and the Rite would remain dormant as far as extension of its membership and authority would be concerned."

== Restorations of Masonic Geometry and Symbolry ==
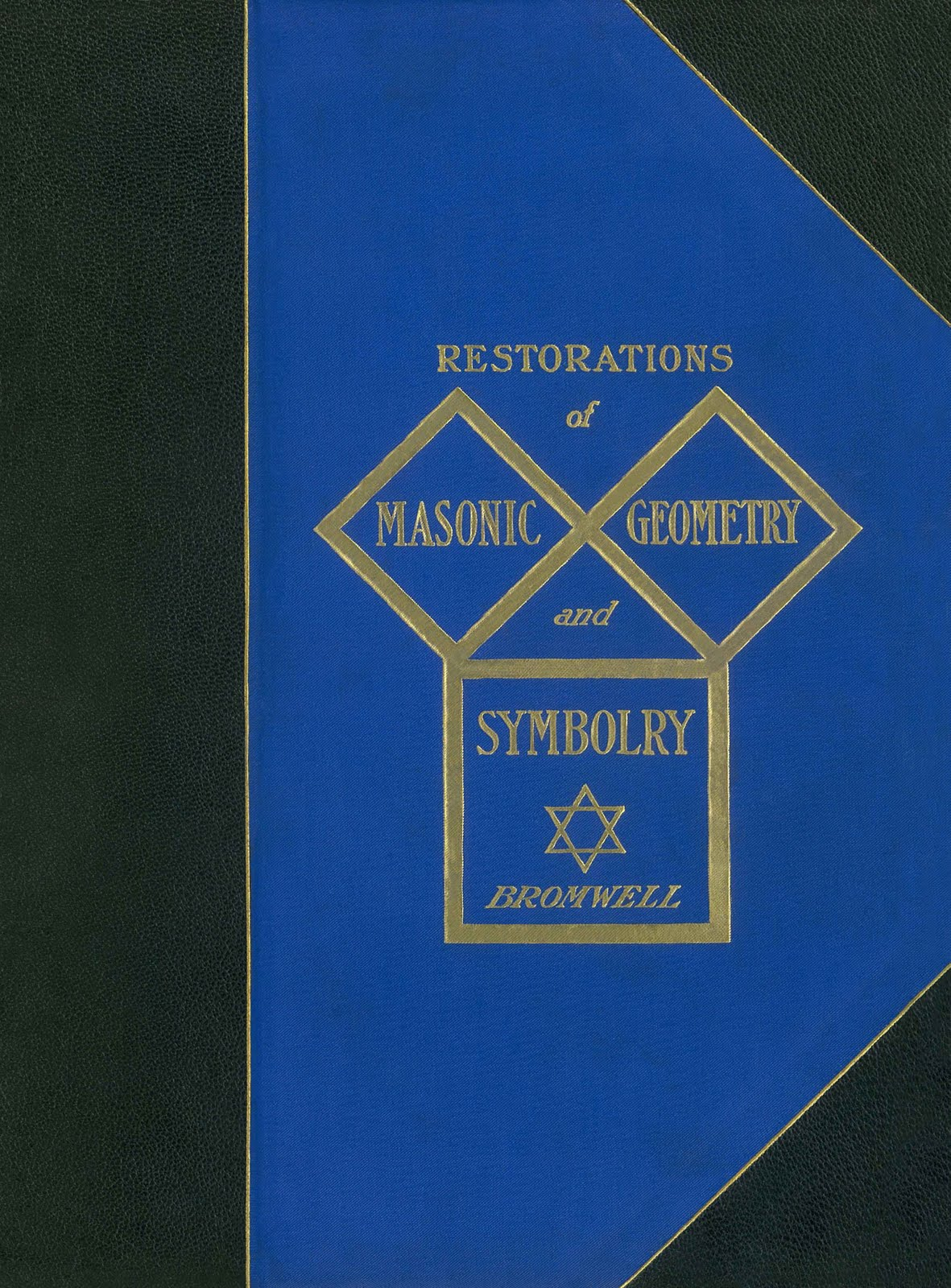
Restorations of Masonic Geometry

In 1884, Bromwell began work on what was to become his life work, entitled Restorations of Masonic Geometry and Symbolry. This book, in a resolution passed by the Grand Lodge of Illinois, is described as "The most remarkable contribution, along the lines of which it treats, yet made to Masonic Literature." To write this "ponderous volume" it is claimed that Bromwell spent "sixteen hours a day for six years and two months" working on what he described as "a dissertation on the lost knowledge of the Lodge." Chapter Nine, dedicated to the floors of the three lodges and titled "The Floor of the Lodge," "occupied two years and two months in its preparation." This claim has been directly challenged by Coil, who argues that "there is not enough known or ascertainable about the working of ancient or medieval lodges, including those up to the middle of the 18th century to occupy an author more than a few days for the telling of the whole story." While Coil did not have access to any of Bromwell's work, he disparages the entire project stating that "the fact that the five lodges established by Bromwell [The Free and Accepted Architects] soon lapsed and that the entire subject matter, including the book, is entirely forgotten, except for encyclopedic items, sufficiently indicates the lack of value in the work."

The year that Bromwell died, the "Henry P. H. Bromwell Masonic Publication Company" was formed for the sole purpose of publishing Restorations of Masonic Geometry and Symbolry The board of directors for this company was composed entirely of Past Grand Masters. The Grand Lodge of Colorado met on the year of his death and discussed how to best honor Bromwell's work. After the character of the work was explained, "showing that it would be one of the most valuable Masonic publications ever produced", the Grand Lodge of Colorado voted "that the proper officers of the Grand Lodge be authorized to guarantee $2000 towards the expenses of the publication of the work." The book was published in 1905.

U.S. House of Representatives
Preceded by John R. Eden	Member of the U.S. House of Representatives from Illinois's 7th congressional district 1865-1869	Succeeded by Jesse H. Moore
