= Crossland Construction Company =

Crossland Construction Company Inc.
- Company type: Private
- Industry: Engineering
- Founded: 1978
- Headquarters: Columbus, Kansas
- Key people: Ivan Crossland Jr.(CEO), John Priest (President), Bennie Crossland (Chairman of the Board), Curt Crossland (President of Midwest Division), Mike Crossland (President of Texas Region), Patrick Crossland (Chief Development Officer), and David Allison (Chief Administrative Officer)
- Website: http://www.crossland.com/

Crossland Construction Company is a contracting company based in Columbus, Kansas. Founded in 1978, the company has worked on projects for a variety of customers, including Harley Davidson, Sam’s Club, and Embassy Suites. It has expanded to nine offices in Kansas, Arkansas, Oklahoma, Missouri, Texas, and Colorado is licensed to operate in 37 states.

== History ==
In 1990, Ivan Crossland Sr., diagnosed with cancer, began to train his six sons to take over the company. While still chief executive officer, Crossland Sr. launched Crossland Heavy Contractors with the help of his sons in 1993. Crossland Heavy Contractors is ranked among the top 100 environmental firms in the United States.

The company provides construction services in a variety of markets including water treatment plants, utilities, transportation, athletic facilities, community, educational, hotels, housing, industrial, healthcare, office, religious, retail, and infrastructure.

Ivan Crossland Sr. died of cancer in 2002. Ivan Crossland, Jr. assumed the role of chief executive officer, John Priest is now company president, Bennie Crossland is chairman of the board, Curt Crossland is president of their Midwest Division, Mike Crossland is president of the Texas Region, Patrick Crossland is the chief development officer, and David Allison is the chief administrative officer.

In 2019, the company ranked 69th in Engineering News–Record’s Top 400 Contractors.

== Notable projects ==
- Pittsburg State University Technology Center, $23.5 million, 1994
- Pittsburg USD 250 elementary school additions, 2008
- Green Forest Athletic Center, 2011
- Walmart corporate campus, $73.05 million, 2020

== Locations ==
- Columbus, Kansas (Headquarters)
- Rogers, Arkansas
- Denver, Colorado
- Kansas City, Missouri
- Oklahoma City, Oklahoma
- Prosper, Texas
- Springfield, Missouri
- Tulsa, Oklahoma
- Wichita, Kansas
