= Nevadaville, Colorado =

American gold-mining town

- Unincorporated place, Ghost town
- Location of Nevadaville, Colorado. Nevadaville (Colorado)
- Coordinates: 39°47′43″N 105°31′57″W
- Country: United States
- State: Colorado
- County: Gilpin County
- Elevation: 9,121 ft (2,780 m)
- Time zone: UTC−07:00 (MST)
  - Summer (DST): UTC−06:00 (MDT)
- GNIS ID: 181473

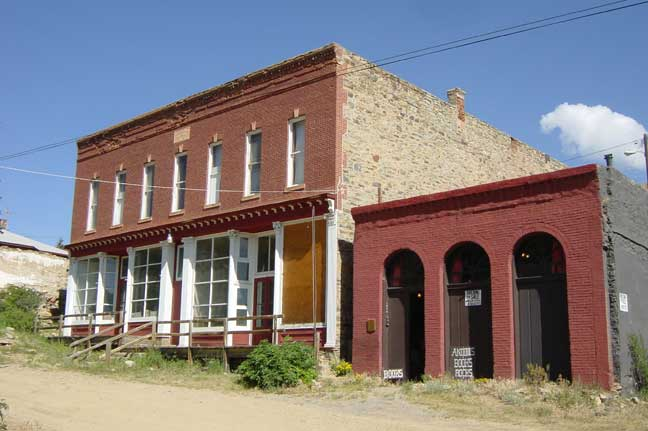
Nevadaville Masonic Lodge #4

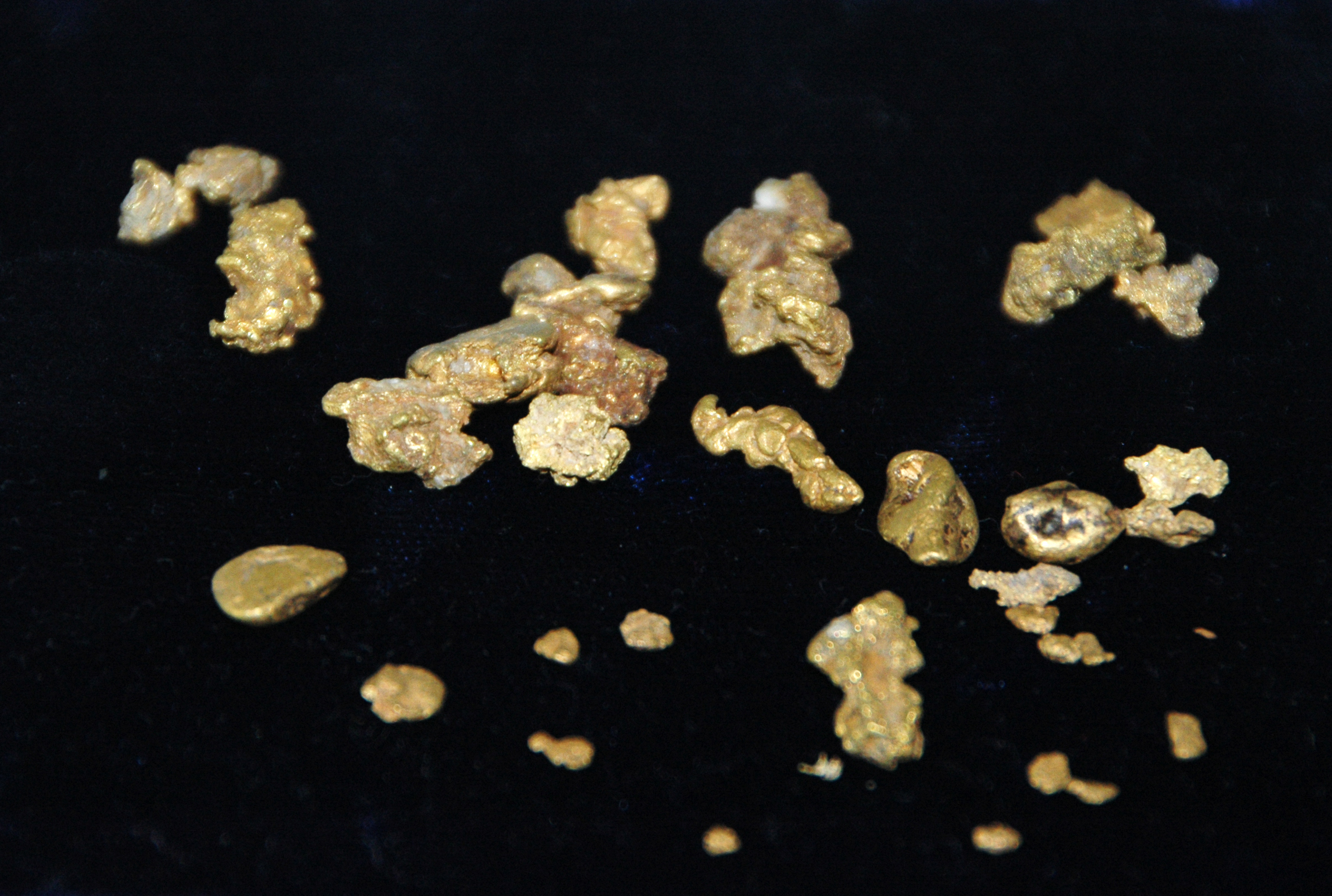
Gold from Nevadaville

Nevadaville (also Nevada City and Bald Mountain) is an extinct gold-mining town in Gilpin County, Colorado, United States. The community is now largely a ghost town, although not completely deserted.

== History ==
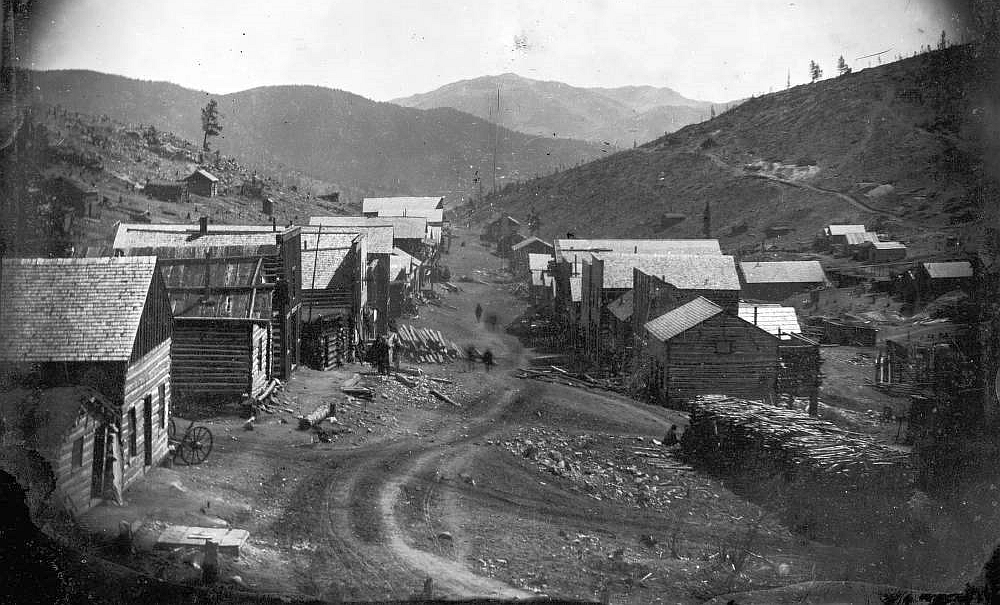
Nevadaville, (circa 1860)

Nevadaville started in 1859, soon after John H. Gregory found the first lode gold in what is now Colorado. At the time, the townsite was in western Kansas Territory. The town grew to house the miners working the Burroughs lode and the Kansas lode. The population was predominantly Irish.

The town was one of the most important mining settlements in the area. A Masonic lodge was organized in 1859 from the Kansas Grand Lodge, becoming Nevada Number 36. After only one regular meeting, the lodge relinquished their charter and came under the jurisdiction of the new Grand Lodge of Colorado who had taken over the territory. The new charter was granted and the lodge became Nevada Lodge Number 4. The lodge still holds meetings as the only Ghost town lodge in Colorado.

The free Territory of Colorado was organized on February 28, 1861. In 1861 a large fire destroyed 50+ buildings, (including naturalist and taxidermist Martha Maxwell's boardinghouse). However, residents made effective use of TNT to save the remaining parts of the city from the fire. Nevadaville rebuilt after fire destroyed a large piece of the town. A more serious threat to the town was that the near-surface oxidized portions of the veins were worked out in the early 1860s. The rudimentary ore mills had trouble recovering gold from the deeper sulfide ores. The continued prosperity of Nevadaville was assured by the construction of successful ore smelters in nearby Black Hawk. The Bald Mountain, Colorado Territory, post office operated at Nevadaville from December 16, 1869, until October 15, 1921. The Post Office Department chose the name Bald Mountain to avoid confusion with other Nevadas and Nevadavilles.

Colorado became a state on August 1, 1876. Nevadaville prospered until about 1900, after which the population declined sharply.

== Geography ==
Nevadaville is south of Central City.

== Demographics ==
Historical population
Census	Pop.	Note	%±
1870	973		—
1880	1,084		11.4%
1890	933		−13.9%
1900	823		−11.8%
1910	367		−55.4%
1920	51		−86.1%
1930	2		−96.1%
1940	25		1,150.0%
1950	6		−76.0%

== See also ==
- List of ghost towns in Colorado
