= Grand Lodge of Kansas =

- Established: March 17, 1856
- Location: Emporia, Kansas
- Region served: Kansas
- Grand Master: Derik L. Hockett
- Website: kansasmason.org

The Grand Lodge of Kansas Ancient Free & Accepted Masons is the governing body that supervise Freemasonry in the U.S. state of Kansas. The Grand Lodge of Kansas is headquartered in Emporia, Kansas.

== History ==
In 1854, three Wyandot people and five white settlers – all of whom were Masons – coalesced in what is now Wyandotte County, Kansas, and petitioned the Grand Lodge of Missouri to establish a Lodge of Masons in a Wyandot Indian village. On August 4, 1854, the dispensation was granted and one week later Kansas Lodge U.D. (eventually to become Wyandotte Lodge No. 3) opened for work. Within two years, two other lodges in Kansas were formed and in 1856 the trio formed the Grand Lodge of Kansas as America's Civil War loomed.

Notably, the first master of Kansas Lodge U.D. was John Milton Chivington, a Methodist missionary to the Wyandot and a vocal opponent of slavery. Chivington left Kansas in 1860, became an officer in the Union army and was later celebrated as a hero for his part in the Battle of Glorieta Pass (1862). His orchestration of the Sand Creek Massacre (1864), however, earned him universal condemnation and ultimately made him infamous.

In the early years of the Grand Lodge, they pledged support to the advancement of Freemasonry in Tasmania and New Zealand.

== Organization ==
The Grand Lodge of Kansas is led by a Grand Master, who is elected to serve a one-year term at the annual meeting, held in March of each year. The Grand Master serves one year as Deputy Grand Master before being installed as the Grand Master. Other officers elected by the membership include Deputy Grand Master, Grand Senior and Junior Wardens, Grand Secretary and Grand Treasurer.

== Community and charity ==
The Grand Lodge has previously sponsored a local Masonic Child Identification Program, as well as drug and alcohol awareness programs in schools. Today, the Grand Lodge offers, through the Kansas Masonic Foundation, academic scholarships, essay scholarships, funds free cancer screenings in Kansas through the University of Kansas Medical Center's Cancer Center, the Kansas Shrine Bowl's Masonic All-State Marching Band Camp, and more.

The Kansas Masonic Foundation, a 501(c) organization under the provisions of the United States Internal Revenue Code (26 U.S.C. § 501(c), is the Kansas Freemasons charity. Though operated by a board of trustees of Kansas masons, and separate from the Grand Lodge of Kansas, the Grand Master and his council of administration sit on the board with the grand master having the authority to oversee the foundation.

== The Kansas Mason ==
Established in 1963, The Kansas Mason is the official publication of the 'Grand Lodge of Kansas. It is published quarterly in February, May, September and December.

== Notable Kansas masons ==
Notable Kansas masons include:

- Bob Dole (Russell), Former US Senator and presidential candidate
- Walter Chrysler (Ellis), Founder of Chrysler
- Henry H. Arnold (Junction City), Five-Star General, United States Air Force
- Jonathan M. Wainwright (Junction City), United States Army General
- Karl Menninger (Topeka), Psychiatrist and founder of Menninger Clinic
- Korleone Young (Wichita), former Detroit Pistons player
