= List of major college football winless seasons =

Year	Team	Record	Head coach	Notes
1870	Columbia	0–1		
1872	Stevens	0–1		
1873	McGill	0–1–1		
1873	Eton	0–1		
1873	CCNY	0–1		
1873	New Jersey AC	0–1		
1873	NYU	0–1		
1873	Princeton Seminary	0–1		
1873	VMI	0–1		
1879	Columbia (2)	0–3–2		Outscored 0–5
1881	Penn	0–5		Scored 1 point
1882	Columbia (3)	0–5		Outscored 0–26
1886	Tufts	0–9		
1886	Stevens	0–7–1		Outscored 6–294, including 58–0 and 61–6 losses to undefeated Princeton
1887	Stevens (2)	0–6–1		
1888	Swarthmore	0–5		
1891	Haverford	0–6		Outscored 8–245
1893	Trinity (CT)	0–9–2		
1894	Wesleyan University	0–5		
1895	Union (NY)	0–5	E.M. Church	
1899	MIT	0–6		
1902	Boston College	0–9	Arthur White	
1902	Union (NY) (2)	0–6	George Whitney	Outscored 0–215
1903	Texas Christian	0–7		
1904	Franklin & Marshall	0–10	W.P. Bates	Outscored 11–303
1904	Colorado State	0–4–1	John McIntosh	
1906	Purdue	0–5	Myron E. Witham	
1906	Tulane	0–4–1	John Russ	Outscored 0–92
1907	Ole Miss	0–6	Frank Mason	Outscored 6–195
1907	Maryville (TN)	0–5	Reed Dickson	Outscored 2–120
1907	Purdue (2)	0–5	L.C. Turner	
1910	Tulane (2)	0–7	A.A. Mason	Outscored 6–126
1910	Colorado State (2)	0–5	George Cassidy	
1911	Colorado State (3)	0–6	Harry Hughes	Outscored 0–216
1911	Villanova	0–5–1	Frederick Crolius	
1913	Wake Forest	0–8	Frank Thompson	
1913	Wyoming	0–5	Ralph Thacker	Outscored 0–183
1916	SMU	0–8–2	Ray Morrison	Outscored 27–455, including a 146–3 loss at Rice.
1916	Florida	0–5	C. J. McCoy	Outscored 3–95
1917	Tulsa	0–8–1	Hal Medford	
1917	Colorado State (4)	0–7–1	Harry Hughes	
1917	Newberry	0–6	Robert Pfohl	Outscored 14–212
1918	Baylor	0–6	Bubs Mosley	
1918	Drexel	0–1	No coach	First of three consecutive losing seasons; Lost only game 0–33
1919	Colorado Mines	0–4–2	Ralph Glaze	
1919	Drexel (2)	0–4	W. L. Ridpath	Back-to-back winless seasons; Ridpath's first and only season as head coach at Drexel; Outscored 3–171
1920	Colorado Mines (2)	0–6	Ralph Glaze	Back-to-back winless seasons
1920	Drexel (3)	0–6	William McAvoy	Third consecutive winless season; McAvoy's first season as head coach at Drexel; Only scored in one game, being outscored 13–250
1921	Southwestern (TX)	0–6–1	William Jennings Gardner	Scoreless tie at SMU in season finale.
1922	Erskine	0–8	David W. Parrish	Outscored 15–243
1923	Wyoming (2)	0–8	John Corbett	Outscored 16–265, closest game a 14–0 loss to the university's faculty.
1926	Western State (CO)	0–8	Eugene Maynor	Outscored 19–249, shutout six times.
1927	Auburn	0–7–2	Dave Morey (0–3) Boozer Pitts (0–4–2)	
1927	Grinnell	0–7–1	Lester Watt	Outscored 21–192, managed a season opening 6–6 tie against William Penn.
1928	Western State (CO) (2)	0–7	Stewart Clark	Outscored 45–279
1930	Iowa State	0–9	C. Noel Workman	Never lost by more than 14 points.
1930	Western State (CO) (3)	0–6	Tefler Meade	Outscored 14–142
1933	Western State (CO) (4)	0–5	Tefler Meade	
1933	Grinnell (2)	0–8–1	Lester Watt	Never allowed greater than 19 points, yet shut out 6 times, included a scoreless tie at Haskell.
1933	Wake Forest (2)	0–5–1	Jim Weaver	Outscored 13–93, scoring all 13 points in season finale loss against Davidson.
1934	Missouri	0–8–1	Frank Carideo	Opening scoreless tie at Colorado, would only manage 25 points on the season.
1935	Cornell	0–6–1	Gilmour Dobie	
1936	Sewanee	0–6–1	Harry E. Clark	Outscored 20–230, earned a scoreless tie against Tennessee Tech.
1937	Washburn	0–10	Elmer Holm	Outscored 38–209
1937	Arizona State	0–8–1	Rudy Lavik	Scored 5 touchdowns, managed a 6–6 tie against Whittier.
1939	Wyoming (3)	0–7–1	Joel Hunt	
1941	Utah State	0–8	E. Lowell Romney	
1941	Centenary	0–8–2	Jake Hanna	
1942	Montana	0–8	Clyde Carpenter	Outscored 35–239, did not score over the last five games.
1943	Columbia (4)	0–8	Lou Little	Outscored 33–313, closest game a 20–7 loss to Yale.
1943	Utah	0–7	Ike Armstrong	Outscored 38–297, shutout in all but two games.
1945	Coast Guard	0–7–1	Johnny Merriman	Outscored 31–209, never scoring greater than 7 points in a game. Managed a scoreless tie at Scranton. Last year of sanctioned football.
1946	Florida (2)	0–9	Raymond Wolf	
1946	Kansas State	0–9	Hobbs Adams	Outscored 41–233, never scoring greater than 7 points.
1946	Fordham	0–7	Ed Danowski	
1947	Drexel (4)	0–8	Ralph Chase	
1947	Kansas State (2)	0–10	Sam Francis	Back-to-back winless seasons.
1947	Stanford	0–9	Marchy Schwartz	
1948	Drexel (5)	0–8	Ralph Chase (0–5) Maury McMains (0–3)	Back-to-back winless seasons
1948	Texas A&M	0–9–1	Harry Stiteler	Season finale 14–14 tie at 7–3 Texas.
1948	Tulsa (2)	0–9–1	Buddy Brothers	
1948	Navy	0–8–1	George Sauer	Played 5 top 12 teams. Tied 3rd ranked Army 21–21 in season finale.
1948	VPI	0–8–1	Robert McNeish	Shutout first 5 games. Earned a 7–7 tie at Richmond in the season's penultimate game.
1949	BYU	0–11	Chick Atkinson	
1949	Mississippi State	0–8–1	Slick Morton	High offensive output of 7 points, done twice, including a 7–7 tie at Clemson.
1950	Auburn (2)	0–10	Earl Brown	Outscored 31–255.
1950	VPI (2)	0–10	Robert McNeish	Outscored 72–430. Lost every game by at least 18 points.
1950	Boston College (2)	0–9–1	Denny Myers	Season opening 7–7 tie against Wake Forest.
1953	Davidson	0–9	Bill Dole	
1954	Tulsa (3)	0–11	Bernie Witucki	
1954	Kansas	0–10	Chuck Mather	Lost to eventual national champion Oklahoma 65–0.
1954	New Mexico State	0–9	James Patton	
1954	Penn (2)	0–9	Steve Sebo	
1955	Alabama	0–10	Jennings Whitworth	Bart Starr passed for 587 yards and 1 touchdown. Lost every game by 15-plus points.
1955	Penn (3)	0–9	Steve Sebo	
1955	Northwestern	0–8–1	Lou Saban	Saban's only year in Evanston. Season finale 7–7 tie against Illinois.
1956	Marquette	0–9	John Druze	
1956	William & Mary	0–9–1	Jack Freeman	Tied Boston University 18–18.
1957	Marquette (2)	0–10	John Druze	Back-to-back winless seasons
1957	Wake Forest (3)	0–10	Paul Amen	
1957	Northwestern (2)	0–9	Ara Parseghian	Parseghian's second season in Evanston. Opened the season with 6 consecutive ranked opponents, capped off with a 47–6 loss to eventual champion Ohio State.
1958	Montana (2)	0–10	Ray Jenkins	
1959	Virginia	0–10	Richard Voris	Outscored 80–393.
1960	Drexel (6)	0–7–1	Jack Hinkle	Season finale 0–0 tie against Delaware Valley
1960	Hardin-Simmons	0–10	Howard McChesney	
1960	Stanford (2)	0–10	Jack Curtice	
1960	Virginia (2)	0–10	Richard Voris	Back-to-back winless seasons. Starting quarterback Gary Cuozzo threw 4 touchdowns.
1960	SMU (2)	0–9–1	Bill Meek	Outscored 31–221, never scoring more than 7 points in a game. Scoreless tie against Texas A&M.
1960	West Virginia	0–8–2	Gene Corum	Outscored 40–259, including 5 shutouts. Tied Richmond 6–6, and Boston University 7–7.
1961	Colorado State (5)	0–10	Don Mullison	
1961	Hardin-Simmons (2)	0–10	Howard McChesney	Outscored 43–377 on the season.
1961	Brown	0–9	John McLaughry	Scored 24 points on the season
1961	Illinois	0–9	Pete Elliott	Outscored 53–289 on the season.
1962	Colorado State (6)	0–10	Milo Lude	Back-to-back winless seasons
1962	Kansas State (3)	0–10	Doug Weaver	Scored 6 points in the first 7 games (6 shutouts). Scored 2 offensive touchdowns.
1962	Tulane (2)	0–10	Tommy O'Boyle	Played four teams ranked in the top 8 nationally.
1962	Wake Forest (4)	0–10	Billy Hildebrand	
1965	Kansas State (4)	0–10	Doug Weaver	Scored 5 offensive touchdowns, scored double-digits once, a 14–21 loss to Cincinnati. Shut out 4 times.
1965	Ohio	0–10	Bill Hess	
1965	Richmond	0–10	Ed Merrick	Scored 6 offensive touchdowns, threw 26 interceptions.
1966	Kansas State (5)	0–9–1	Doug Weaver	Cornelius Davis ran for 1028 yard, offense only scored 3 touchdowns. Tied Kansas 3–3 on October 15.
1967	Marshall	0–10	Charlie Snyder	Threw 1 touchdown pass, 19 interceptions. High offensive output of 14 points in a 14–48 loss to Ohio.
1967	Maryland	0–9	Robert Ward	Scored 6 offensive touchdowns. Scored double-digits once, a 17–35 loss at Wake Forest.
1968	New Mexico (2)	0–10	Rudy Feldman	
1968	Wichita State	0–10	Eddie Kriwiel	
1968	Wisconsin	0–10	John Coatta	Threw 3 touchdown passes, 19 interceptions, being outscored 86–310. Lost to eventual national champion Ohio State 43–8.
1969	Baylor (2)	0–10	Bill Beall	Outscored 87–344, throwing for 3 touchdowns and 29 interceptions. Lost to eventual national champion Texas 56–14.
1969	Illinois (2)	0–10	Jim Valek	
1969	VMI	0–10	Vito Ragazzo	
1969	Cal State-Los Angeles	0–9	Walt Thurmond	
1970	Wichita State (2)	0–9	Ben Wilson (0-3) Bob Seaman (0-6)	A plane crash in Colorado on October 2 killed coach Wilson, 14 players and 16 others. Two games were cancelled before the season resumed with surviving varsity players and freshman team members.
1971	Brown (2)	0–9	Len Jardine	
1973	Florida State	0–11	Larry Jones	Three one-score losses, lost to Florida 49–0 in season finale.
1973	Iowa	0–11	Frank Lauterbur	Outscored by an average of 36.5-12.7; was shut out just once (50-0 to Illinois).
1973	UTEP	0–11	Tommy Hudspeth	Allowed 544 points (49.5/game), allowing 54 plus point five times, including an 82–6 loss at Utah.
1973	Army	0–10	Tom Cahill	Scored 7 offensive touchdowns. Lost to Nay 51–0 in season finale.
1973	Southwestern Louisiana (Note: School changed its name to the University of Louisiana at Lafayette in 1999, and athletic teams rebranded as "Louisiana".)	0–10	Russ Faulkinberry	School's entire athletic program was serving an NCAA-mandated two-year postseason ban due to egregious violations by the men's basketball team which led to a two-year death penalty in that sport.
1976	Texas Christian (2)	0–11	Jim Shofner	Outscored 128–430. Lost to 5th ranked Texas Tech 10–14.
1978	Boston College (3)	0–11	Ed Chlebek	Lost 4 one-score games, including a season finale 24–28 loss to Temple in Tokyo.
1978	Northwestern (3)	0–10–1	Rick Venturi	Season opening scoreless tie at Illinois. Would lose by at least 17 in the following 10 games.
1979	Florida (3)	0–10-1	Charley Pell	First year for Charley Pell. Three one-score losses, two of which were to ranked teams. Tied with Georgia Tech in the home opener.
1979	Richmond (2)	0–11	Jim Tait	Scored 7 offensive touchdowns.
1979	Penn (4)	0–9	Harry Gamble	
1980	Northwestern (4)	0–11	Rick Venturi	
1980	Oregon State	0–11	Joe Avezzano	Lost every game by double digits, including a 34–3 season finale loss to UCLA in Tokyo.
1981	Colorado State (7)	0–12	Sark Arslanian (0–6) Chester Caddas (0–6)	First college team to go 0–12 in a season; only game decided by one score was a 35–29 loss to UTEP, and they only scored 20+ points in two other games all season.
1981	Eastern Michigan	0–11	Mike Stock	High offensive output of 14 points.
1981	Northwestern (5)	0–11	Dennis Green	Second consecutive winless season. Averaged 1.5 yards/rush, shutout five times.
1982	Kent State	0–11	Ed Chlebek	Lost back-to-back games despite allowing under 10 points (9–7 at Eastern Michigan, 3–0 to Toledo).
1982	Rice	0–11	Ray Alborn	
1982	Richmond (3)	0–10	Dal Shealy	
1983	West Texas A&M	0–10–1	Don Davis	
1984	Indiana	0–11	Bill Mallory	Lost 7 one-score games.
1987	New Mexico (3)	0–11	Mike Sheppard	Barry Garrison threw for 3,163 yards, with Terance Mathis having 1132 yards receiving.
1987	Kansas State (6)	0–10–1	Stan Parrish	Lost 26–22 to Division I-AA Austin Peay in season opener. Tied Kansas 17–17 following a stretch of three 49+ point losses to Oklahoma, Nebraska, and Oklahoma State.
1988	Kansas State (7)	0–11	Stan Parrish	Last season pre-Bill Snyder. Played four ranked teams.
1988	Rice (2)	0–11	Jerry Berndt	Lost to 11th ranked Arkansas 21–14 in Little Rock. Lost to eventual national champion Notre Dame 54–11 the following week.
1988	Miami (Ohio)	0–10–1	Tim Rose	21–21 tie at Bowling Green
1989	Kent State (2)	0–11	Dick Crum	Lost to Western Michigan 4–26. Lost 15–13 in season finale loss to Miami (Ohio).
1989	New Mexico State	0–11	Mike Knoll	
1989	Northwestern (6)	0–11	Francis Peay	Allowed 45.2 points per game, including a 76–14 loss at Michigan State.
1991	Oklahoma State	0–10–1	Pat Jones	Limited to 3 rushing touchdowns. Tied Iowa State 6–6.
1993	Kent State (3)	0–11	Pete Cordelli	
1994	Iowa State (2)	0–10-1	Jim Walden	Tied 31-31 with Oklahoma State. Scored at least 12 points in all but two games, including no shutouts, but the Cyclones' season-lowest defensive effort was 23 points (against Western Michigan).
1994	Ohio (2)	0–11	Tom Lichtenberg	Scored 9 offensive touchdowns, shutout 3 times, including a 5–0 loss to Utah State.
1996	Duke	0–11	Fred Goldsmith	Lost 3 one-score games, including a 16–17 loss at Wake Forest.
1997	Illinois (3)	0–11	Ron Turner	Turner's first season. Robert Holcombe rushed for 1253 yards, adding 277 yards receiving. Lost every game by multiple scores, scoring 76 points in 8 Big Ten games.
1997	Northern Illinois	0–11	Joe Novak	
1997	Rutgers	0–11	Terry Shea	Allowed 48 or more points 7 times. Closest loss was 37–35 to Army.
1998	Hawaii	0–12	Fred von Appen	Von Appen's 3rd and final year. Closest game was a 30–21 loss at Utah. They and Kent State (below) are the last Division I-A/FBS teams to lose every game by multiple scores in a full-length season.
1998	Kent State (4)	0–11	Dean Pees	Pees' first season at Kent State. Lost every game by multiple scores, including a 24–10 loss to Division I-AA/FCS Youngstown State. They and Hawaii (above) are the last Division I-A/FBS teams to lose every game by multiple scores in a full-length season.
1998	UNLV	0–11	Jeff Horton	
1999	Ball State	0–11	Bill Lynch	Did not play a one-score game until season finale, a 21–27 loss to Central Michigan.
1999	Buffalo	0–11	Craig Cirbus	Cirbus' first year at Buffalo. Drew Haddad would have 1158 yards receiving, no other receiver had more than 148 yards. Lost to two Division I-AA/FCS opponents (Connecticut and Hofstra). Closest losses were by 7 to Akron and Hofstra.
1999	South Carolina	0–11	Lou Holtz	Holtz's 1st year at South Carolina. Limited to 8 offensive touchdowns. Only one-score game a 10–11 loss to Vanderbilt, played five ranked opponents.
2000	Duke (2)	0–11	Carl Franks	First of two consecutive winless seasons. Was shut out by East Carolina in season opener, did not play a one-score game until November 4, a 26–28 loss at Wake Forest.
2001	Duke (3)	0–11	Carl Franks	For a second consecutive season the Blue Devils finished with an 0-12 winless season. D. Bryant threw for 2454 yards. Allowed 31 plus points every loss, sans a 15–13 loss at Rice.
2001	Houston	0–11	Dana Dimel	Lost 2 one-score games, including a 28–29 loss to Cincinnati. Played 3 ranked teams.
2001	Navy (2)	0–10	Charlie Weatherbie (0–7) Rick Lantz (0–3)	Lost 3 one-score games, and lost to Army 26–17 in the season finale. Weatherbie was replaced following a 21–20 loss at Toledo.
2003	Army (2)	0–13	Todd Berry (0–6) John Mumford (0–7)	Army ran a pass heavy offense, throwing for 2,391 yards on the season. Coach Todd Berry was fired following a loss to 0–6 East Carolina, which turned out to be East Carolina's only win of the season. Season capped off with a 34–6 loss to rival Navy. Closest losses were by 6 to East Carolina, and by 4 to Wake Forest. As of 2025, they are the only team to go 0–13 in a season.
2003	SMU (3)	0–12	Phil Bennett	Lost 3 one-score games, including a 20–13 season finale loss to 19th ranked TCU.
2004	UCF	0–11	George O'Leary	O'Leary's first year at UCF. Junior wide receiver Brandon Marshall would have 8 catches for 84 yards. Four one-score losses, including a 30–28 loss to Northern Illinois on a last-second field goal, and a 17–16 overtime loss to Ohio on a missed extra point.
2005	New Mexico State (2)	0–12	Hal Mumme	Air Raid guru Hal Mumme's first year at New Mexico State ended the season with 3,192 yards passing. Lost two games by one-score, including an overtime loss to Idaho.
2005	Temple	0–11	Bobby Wallace	Wallace's 8th and final season, finishing with a 19–71 record at Temple. Outscored 498–107, allowing at least 34 points in 10 of 11 games, while never scoring more than 17 points. Did lose to Western Michigan 19–16 on a game winning field goal by Western Michigan. Finished dead last in Division I-A/FBS in both points scored and points allowed.
2006	Duke (4)	0–12	Ted Roof	Ted Roof's 3rd year at Duke. Thad Lewis started all 12 games, throwing for 2134 yards and 11 touchdowns. Would lose two one-point games, 13–14 to eventual ACC champion Wake Forest on a blocked 31 yard field goal as time expired, and a 44–45 season finale loss to North Carolina, missing a game-tying extra point attempt with 2 minutes remaining. Also lost to Miami 20-15, driving to Miami 6 yard line before throwing interception on game's final play. Team was shut out in 3 of first 4 games, including vs FCS Richmond, despite having future NFL head coach Bill O'Brien as offensive coordinator.
2006	FIU	0–12	Don Strock	Scored 10 offensive touchdowns in Don Strock's 3rd and final season. Season marred by a brawl against Miami (FL) in a 35–0 loss. Lost five games by one-score, against Middle Tennessee, South Florida, Bowling Green, Maryland and North Texas. Lost two games by one-point, against Middle Tennessee State and South Florida. Drove to Maryland nine yard line before throwing interception on game's final play to lose 14–10.
2008	Washington	0–12	Ty Willingham	Ty Willingham's last season with Washington. Quarterback Jake Locker would miss the final 8 games of the season. In a week 2 loss to 15th-ranked BYU, Locker scored a touchdown to bring Washington to within 28–27, but incurred an excessive celebration penalty, which led to the ensuing extra point being blocked. Would lose the Apple Cup 16–13 in double overtime to 1–10 Washington State.
2009	Eastern Michigan (2)	0–12	Ron English	Former Michigan Defensive coordinator Ron English's first year. Would blow a 27–13 second half lead against Ball State, losing 27–29. Lost to Northwestern 27–24 on a 49 yard field goal with 5 seconds left.
2009	Western Kentucky	0–12	David Elson	David Elson's third and final season as head coach. Running back Bobby Rainey rushed for 939 yards and 6 touchdowns. Lost to FCS Central Arkansas 28–7 on September 19. Lost 4 one-score games, including the final 3 games of the season. Would blow a 20–3 second half lead to Arkansas State in the season finale, losing 24–20.
2012	Southern Mississippi	0–12	Ellis Johnson	Coming off of a 12–2, C-USA championship season under coach Larry Fedora. Started four quarterbacks throughout the season. Lost four one-score games, including a 21–17 loss to 19th-ranked Louisville. Would fail to convert a fourth quarter 2-point conversion trailing UTEP 33–34 on November 17. Jamie Collins led the defense with 20 TFL's, 10 sacks.
2013	Georgia State	0–12	Trent Miles	First season in FBS, and Trent Miles first season following Bill Curry's tenure. Lost to 3 FCS teams, closest game a 35–33 loss to Arkansas State Wide receiver Albert Wilson had 1177 yards and 8 touchdowns.
2013	Miami (Ohio) (2)	0–12	Don Treadwell (0–5) Mike Bath (0–7)	Don Treadwell would be dismissed in his third season following a 21–9 loss to Central Michigan. High point total was 17 in a 24–17 loss to Akron.
2015	Kansas (2)	0–12	David Beaty	David Beaty's first year as head coach, replacing Charlie Weis. Lost to FCS South Dakota State 41–38 to open the season. Next closest win was a 23–17 loss to 13th ranked TCU on November 14. Played four teams ranked in the top 15, and South Dakota State was ranked 16th in the FCS rankings.
2015	UCF (2)	0–12	George O'Leary (0–8) Danny Barrett (0–4)	Two-years following a Fiesta Bowl victory, one year after AAC title. George O'Leary would retire following a 59–10 loss to Houston. Had two one-point losses, 15–14 to FIU in the season opener, and 15–16 to FCS Furman on September 19. UCF would quickly recover to go 14-0 and win Peach Bowl two years later.
2017	UTEP (2)	0–12	Sean Kugler (0–5) Mike Price (0–7)	Outscored 141–441, coach Sean Kugler was fired following a 35–21 loss to Army. Would lose 15–14 the following week to Western Kentucky, would lose by at least 17 points in every following game. Guard Will Hernandez would be drafted 34th overall by the Giants.
2019	Akron	0–12	Tom Arth	Arth's first season at Akron. Started the year 0–10 against spread, the first team since at least 2005 with such a dubious distinction. Akron's closest loss in first 10 games was by 8 points to otherwise winless UMass, which lost their other 11 games by at least 21 points. In season's 11th game, Akron lost by just 3 points as 30-point underdogs to eventual MAC champion Miami (Ohio), which was Akron's closest loss on the year, as well as the first and only time they covered the spread.
2020	Louisiana–Monroe	0–10	Matt Viator	Viator's fifth and final season at ULM. The start of the season was delayed due to the ongoing COVID-19 pandemic. The Warhawks allowed at least 31 points in every game of the season. The team's closest loss was a 35–30 loss to Georgia Southern on October 3. In addition, ULM lost its rivalry game against Louisiana 70–20. Over the course of the season, ULM was outscored 420–163 by its opponents, and never once held a lead.
2020	Kansas (3)	0–9	Les Miles	Miles' second and final season at Kansas. The start of the season was delayed due to the ongoing COVID-19 pandemic. The pandemic resulted in the season being shorter than normal. One game was cancelled due to a COVID-19 outbreak from their opponent. Kansas finished winless for the second time since 2015. The Jayhawks' closest loss was a 16–13 loss to Texas Tech in their final game of the season. The Texas Tech game was also the Jayhawks' only game where they allowed fewer than 38 points. Kansas never scored more than 23 points in a game. Throughout the course of the season, the Jayhawks were outscored by their opponents 414–145.
2020	Vanderbilt	0–9	Derek Mason (0–8) Todd Fitch (0–1)	Mason's seventh and final season at Vanderbilt. The start of the season was delayed due to the ongoing COVID-19 pandemic, and the Commodores played a conference-only schedule. The Commodores opened the season with a 17–12 loss at No. 10 Texas A&M; they would go on to lose six of their final eight games by 21 points or more. Their closest game of the season was a 38–35 loss to Kentucky on November 14. Vanderbilt ended the season with a 42–17 loss to rival Tennessee.
2020	Northern Illinois (2)	0–6	Thomas Hammock	
2020	UNLV (2)	0–6	Marcus Arroyo	
2020	Arizona	0–5	Kevin Sumlin	Sumlin's third and final season at Arizona. The season was delayed and had its game count cut in half due to the ongoing COVID-19 pandemic. The university's first winless season. The Wildcats' closest loss was a 30–34 score against No. 20 USC in their first game of the season. At the final game of the season, the university suffered their worst loss in history against rival Arizona State at a 7–70 loss, resulting in Sumlin getting fired the day after. The team concluded at a total score of 87–199.
2020	Bowling Green	0–5	Scot Loeffler	
2020	FIU (2)	0–5	Butch Davis	
2020	UMass	0–4	Walt Bell	
2024	Kent State (5)	0–12	Kenni Burns	Burns' Golden Flashes failed to improve on their previous season's record of 1–11, and were the first team to go winless in a full 12-game season since 2019, moving his two-year head coaching record to 1–23. This was the first winless season for Kent State since 1998. Kent State was shut out three separate times, including a 71–0 loss to seventh-ranked Tennessee. They lost to FCS Saint Francis (PA) 23–17 in their second game of the season. Their closest loss came to Ball State, with Kent State scoring 21 points in the fourth quarter, but falling short at a score of 37–35. This was the second consecutive season that Kent State failed to win a game against an FBS opponent.
2025	UMass (2)	0–12	Joe Harasymiak	This was Harasymiak's first season at UMass, as well as his first season as a head coach. This was the Minutemen's first season in the Mid-American Conference since leaving after 2015; they went 0–8 in conference games. This was the Minutemen's second winless season in the 2020s; the other was their 2020 season, where they went 0–4. They lost to FCS Bryant 27–26 in their second game of the season. This was the second consecutive season that UMass failed to win a game against an FBS opponent.

== See also ==
- List of undefeated NCAA Division I football teams
