= Henry Grant =

Henry Grant may refer to:

- Henry Grant (photographer) (1907–2004), British freelance photographer
- Henry Grant (British Army officer) (1848–1919)
- Henry R. Grant, college football player at Harvard University
- Hugo Gutmann (1880–1962), later known as Henry G. Grant, German-Jewish veteran of World War I and Adolf Hitler's superior officer

== See also ==
- Harry Grant (disambiguation)
