= 1874 Harvard vs. McGill football game =

Football game

- First "Boston rules" football game played in the United States
| McGill Redmen | Harvard Crimson |
| 0 | 3 |
| | 1 | Total |
|---|---|---|
| McGill | 0 | 0 |
| Harvard | 3 | 3 |
- Date: May 14, 1874
- Season: 1873
- Stadium: Jarvis Field
- Location: Cambridge

1874 Harvard vs. McGill rugby game
- First rugby football game played in the United States
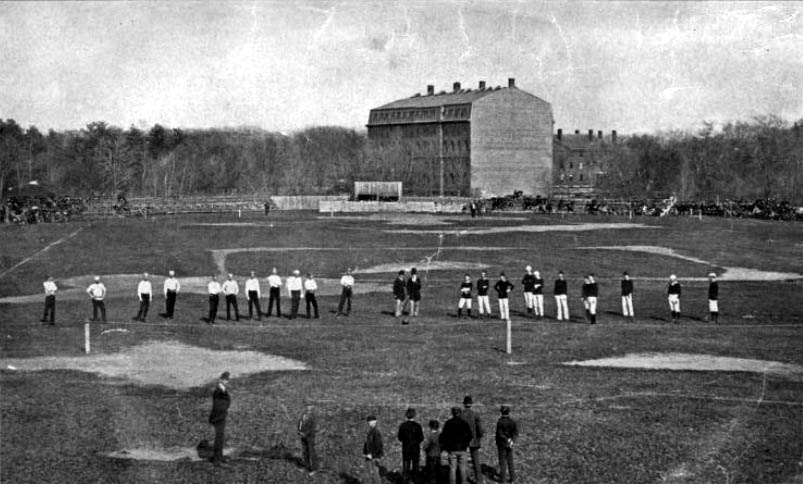
- The second game, played under the rugby rules. Harvard players at left, in white shirts
| McGill Redmen | Harvard Crimson |
| 0 | 0 |
| | 1 | 2 | 3 | Total |
|---|---|---|---|---|
| McGill | 0 | 0 | 0 | 0 |
| Harvard | 0 | 0 | 0 | 0 |
- Date: May 15, 1874
- Season: 1873
- Stadium: Jarvis Field
- Location: Cambridge

The 1874 Harvard vs. McGill football game was a two-game series between the Harvard Crimson and the McGill Redmen held in Cambridge, Massachusetts, on May 14 and 15, 1874.

With the first game being played under the Harvard's "Boston game", the second one was the first rugby-style football game played in the United States. It used three periods or "games" and ended in a scoreless tie.

A Princeton vs. Rutgers football game had been played five years earlier (in 1869), but under a variation of England's The Football Association rules, closer to contemporary soccer than American football.

The Boston game rules were developed by the first organized football team, the Oneida Football Club, founded in 1862. Many of its members went on to found, and play for, the Harvard team.

== Overview ==
On October 20, 1873, representatives from Yale, Columbia, Princeton, and Rutgers met at the Fifth Avenue Hotel in New York City to codify the first set of intercollegiate football rules. Before this meeting, each school had its own set of rules and games were usually played using the home team's own particular code. At this meeting, a list of rules, based more on association football than on rugby football, was drawn up for intercollegiate football games.

Harvard, which played the Boston game, a version of football that allowed carrying, refused to attend this rules conference and continued to play under its own code. While Harvard's voluntary absence from the meeting made it hard for them to schedule games against other American universities, it agreed to a challenge to play McGill University, from Montreal, Canada, in a two-game series.

The McGill team traveled to Cambridge to meet Harvard. On May 14, 1874, the first game, played under Boston rules, was dominated by Harvard, which lead 3–0 after only 22 minutes when the game was ended. The next day, the two teams played under "McGill" rugby rules to a scoreless tie. The first game featured a round ball instead of a rugby-style oblong ball. McGill used a bladder covered by leather instead of a rubber ball as did Harvard, which was much more difficult to kick.

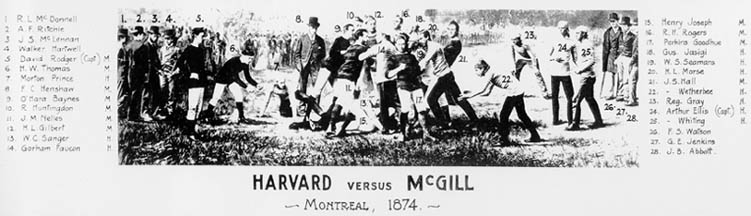
After the two games in Cambridge, Massachusetts, Harvard travelled to Montreal to play a third game (picture)

The game drew about 500 attendees, most of whom were students. This series of games represents an important milestone in the development of the modern games of Canadian and American football. A similar game was played a year later between Harvard and Tufts establishing this as the first game between two American colleges played under rules used in today's version of American football.

At this time, the try was not used in American football. The try would later evolve into the score known as the touchdown. In late 1874, the Harvard team traveled to Montreal to play McGill in rugby, and won by three tries in front of 2,000 spectators.

== See also ==
- 1873 college football season
- 1874 college football season
