= 1873–74 Harvard Crimson football team =

American college football season

1873 Harvard Crimson football
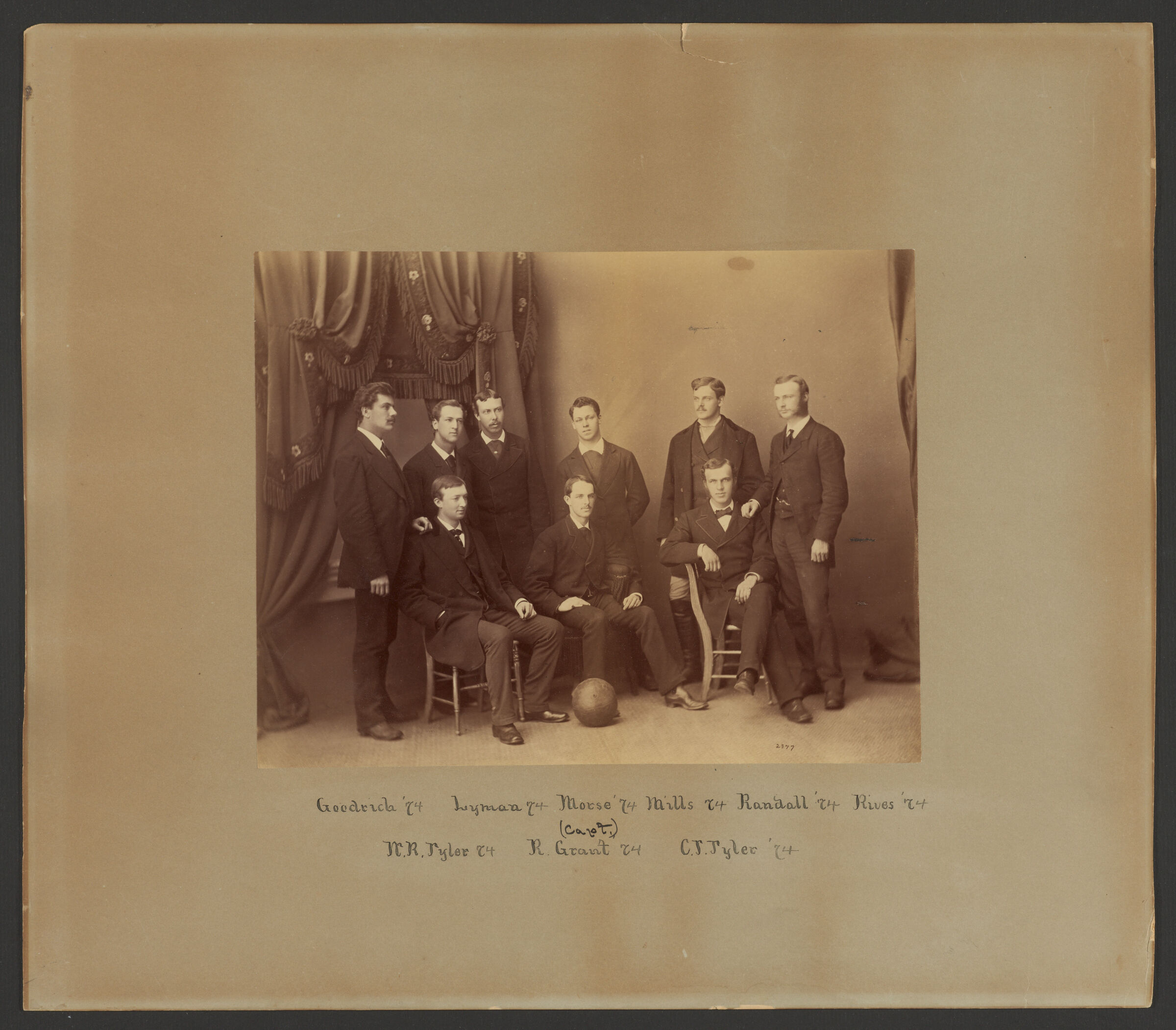
- Conference: Independent
- Record: 1–0–1
- Head coach: None
- Captain: Henry R. Grant
- Home stadium: Jarvis Field

1873 college football records
| | Conf. | | | Overall |
| Team | W | | L | | W | | L |
|---|---|---|---|---|---|---|---|---|
| Princeton | | – | | 1 | – | 0 | – | 0 |
| Harvard | | – | | 1 | – | 0 | – | 1 |
| Washington and Lee | | – | | 4 | – | 0 | – | 0 |
| Stevens | | – | | 3 | – | 1 | – | 0 |
| Yale | | – | | 2 | – | 1 | – | 0 |
| Columbia | | – | | 2 | – | 1 | – | 0 |
| Rutgers | | – | | 1 | – | 2 | – | 0 |
| McGill | | – | | 0 | – | 1 | – | 1 |
| Eton | | – | | 0 | – | 1 | – | 0 |
| CCNY | | – | | 0 | – | 1 | – | 0 |
| New Jersey AC | | – | | 0 | – | 1 | – | 0 |
| NYU | | – | | 0 | – | 1 | – | 0 |
| Princeton Seminary | | – | | 0 | – | 1 | – | 0 |
| VMI | | – | | 0 | – | 1 | – | 0 |

The 1873–74 Harvard Crimson football team represented Harvard University in the 1873 college football season. The team played only two intercollegiate games, both against the team from McGill University in Cambridge, with one game ending in a Harvard victory and the other ending in a scoreless tie. The first game was played under Harvard's rules, while the second game played using McGill's rules on May 15, 1874, was the first rugby-style football game played in the United States. The team captain was Henry R. Grant.

== Schedule ==
| Date | Opponent | Site | Result | Source |
|---|---|---|---|---|
| May 14, 1874 | McGill | Cambridge, MA | W 3–0 | |
| May 15, 1874 | McGill | Jarvis Field; Cambridge, MA (first rugby football game in U.S.) | T 0–0 | |

== See also ==
- 1874 Harvard vs. McGill football game
- Early history of American football
