= 1873 Princeton Tigers football team =

American college football season

1873 Princeton Tigers football

National champion
- Conference: Independent
- Record: 1–0
- Head coach: None
- Captain: Cyrus O. Dershimer

1873 college football records
	Conf.			Overall
Team	W		L		W		L
Princeton		–		1	–	0	–	0
Harvard		–		1	–	0	–	1
Washington and Lee		–		4	–	0	–	0
Stevens		–		3	–	1	–	0
Yale		–		2	–	1	–	0
Columbia		–		2	–	1	–	0
Rutgers		–		1	–	2	–	0
McGill		–		0	–	1	–	1
Eton		–		0	–	1	–	0
CCNY		–		0	–	1	–	0
New Jersey AC		–		0	–	1	–	0
NYU		–		0	–	1	–	0
Princeton Seminary		–		0	–	1	–	0
VMI		–		0	–	1	–	0

The 1873 Princeton Tigers football team represented the College of New Jersey, then more commonly known as Princeton College, in the 1873 college football season. The team played Yale for the first time and won 3–0, finished with a 1–0 record, and was retroactively named national champion by the Billingsley Report, National Championship Foundation, and Parke H. Davis. The team captain was Cyrus O. Dershimer.

This season marked the second of four consecutive national championships, and one of 11 in a 13-year period between 1869 and 1881.

== Schedule ==
Date	Opponent	Site	Result	Source
November 15	at Yale	Hamilton Park; New Haven, CT (rivalry)	W 3–0	
