= 1873 Rutgers Queensmen football team =

American college football season

1873 Rutgers Queensmen football
- Conference: Independent
- Record: 1–2
- Head coach: None
- Captain: George D. Lydecker

1873 college football records
| | Conf. | | | Overall |
| Team | W | | L | | W | | L |
|---|---|---|---|---|---|---|---|---|
| Princeton | | – | | 1 | – | 0 | – | 0 |
| Harvard | | – | | 1 | – | 0 | – | 1 |
| Washington and Lee | | – | | 4 | – | 0 | – | 0 |
| Stevens | | – | | 3 | – | 1 | – | 0 |
| Yale | | – | | 2 | – | 1 | – | 0 |
| Columbia | | – | | 2 | – | 1 | – | 0 |
| Rutgers | | – | | 1 | – | 2 | – | 0 |
| McGill | | – | | 0 | – | 1 | – | 1 |
| Eton | | – | | 0 | – | 1 | – | 0 |
| CCNY | | – | | 0 | – | 1 | – | 0 |
| New Jersey AC | | – | | 0 | – | 1 | – | 0 |
| NYU | | – | | 0 | – | 1 | – | 0 |
| Princeton Seminary | | – | | 0 | – | 1 | – | 0 |
| VMI | | – | | 0 | – | 1 | – | 0 |

The 1873 Rutgers Queensmen football team represented Rutgers University in the 1873 college football season. Rutgers lost to Yale and split two games with Columbia. The Captain of the team was George D. Lydecker.

== Schedule ==
| Date | Opponent | Site | Result | Source |
|---|---|---|---|---|
| October 25 | at Yale | Hamilton Park; New Haven, CT | L 1–3 | |
| November 1 | Columbia | New Brunswick, NJ | W 5–4 | |
| November 15 | vs. Columbia | St. George Cricket Grounds; Hoboken, NJ | L 3–4 | |
