= Isaac H. Lionberger House =

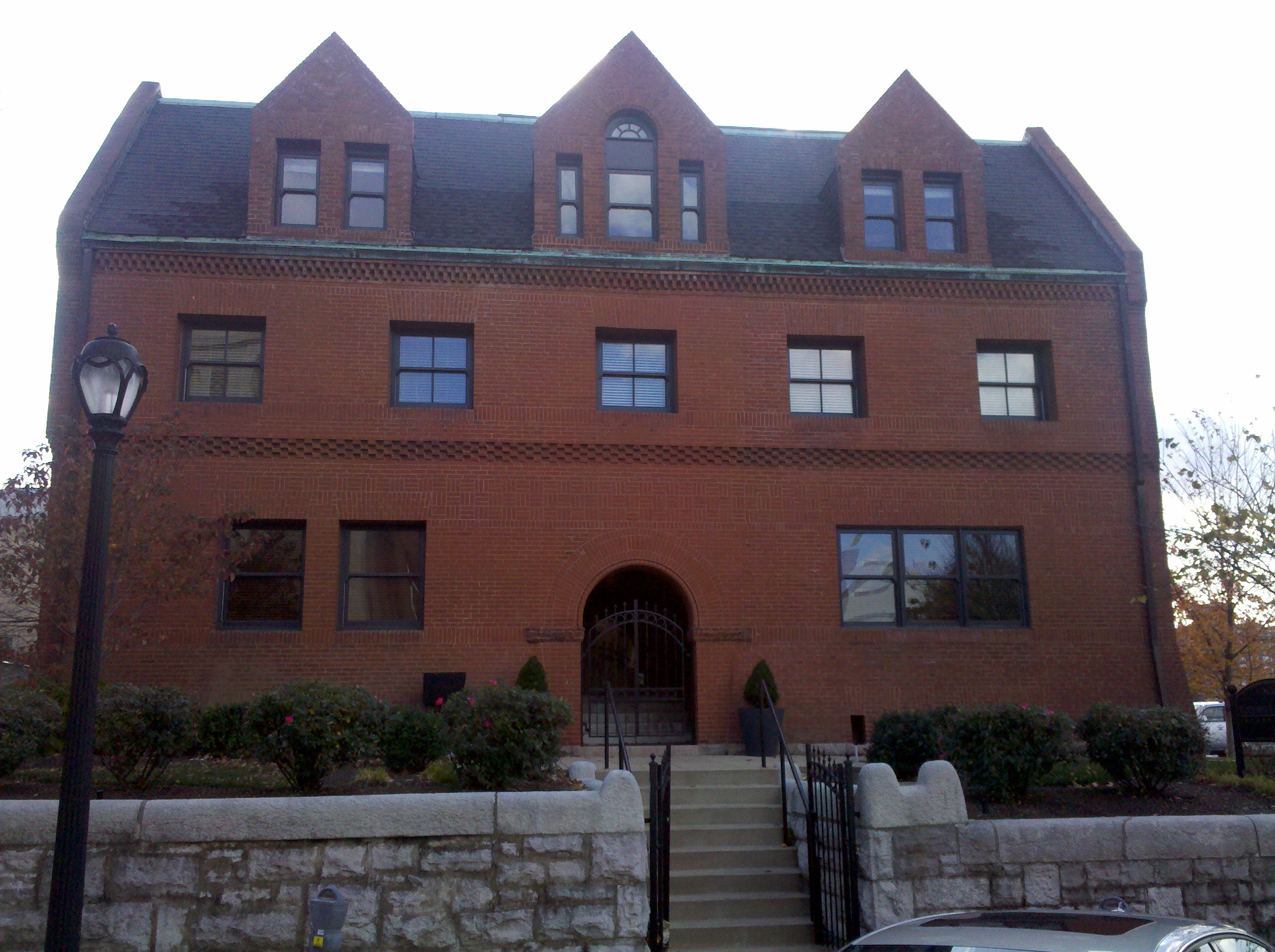
- The Lionberger House, 13 November 2011

- Location within Missouri

General information
- Location: 3630 Grandel Square; St. Louis, Missouri
- Coordinates: 38°38′26″N 90°13′56″W
- Completed: 1887 (added 1975)
- Governing body: Local

Technical details
- Material: Brick

Design and construction
- Architect: Henry Hobson Richardson
- Awards: St. Louis Landmark

The Isaac H. Lionberger House at 3630 Grandel Square in Midtown St. Louis, Missouri, is the last private residence designed by noted American architect Henry Hobson Richardson. Designed in 1885–86, the building was built after Richardson's death. It was built for Isaac H. Lionberger, a well-known St. Louis lawyer who later became Assistant Attorney General of the United States.

The Lionberger House became a St. Louis Landmark in 1975. In 2005, the house was restored and divided into office and residential space.
