= 1873 Columbia football team =

American college football season

1873 Columbia football
- Conference: Independent
- Record: 2–1
- Head coach: None
- Captain: Charles King

1873 college football records
	Conf.			Overall
Team	W		L		W		L
Princeton		–		1	–	0	–	0
Harvard		–		1	–	0	–	1
Washington and Lee		–		4	–	0	–	0
Stevens		–		3	–	1	–	0
Yale		–		2	–	1	–	0
Columbia		–		2	–	1	–	0
Rutgers		–		1	–	2	–	0
McGill		–		0	–	1	–	1
Eton		–		0	–	1	–	0
CCNY		–		0	–	1	–	0
New Jersey AC		–		0	–	1	–	0
NYU		–		0	–	1	–	0
Princeton Seminary		–		0	–	1	–	0
VMI		–		0	–	1	–	0

The 1873 Columbia football team represented Columbia University in the 1873 college football season. The team had no head coach, and compiled a record of 2–1. Charles King served as team captain.

== Schedule ==
Date	Opponent	Site	Result	Source
October 25	at Stevens		W 2–1	
November 1	at Rutgers	New Brunswick, NJ	L 4–5	
November 15	vs. Rutgers	St. George Cricket Grounds; Hoboken, NJ	W 4–3	
