= 1873 Yale Bulldogs football team =

American college football season

1873 Yale Bulldogs football
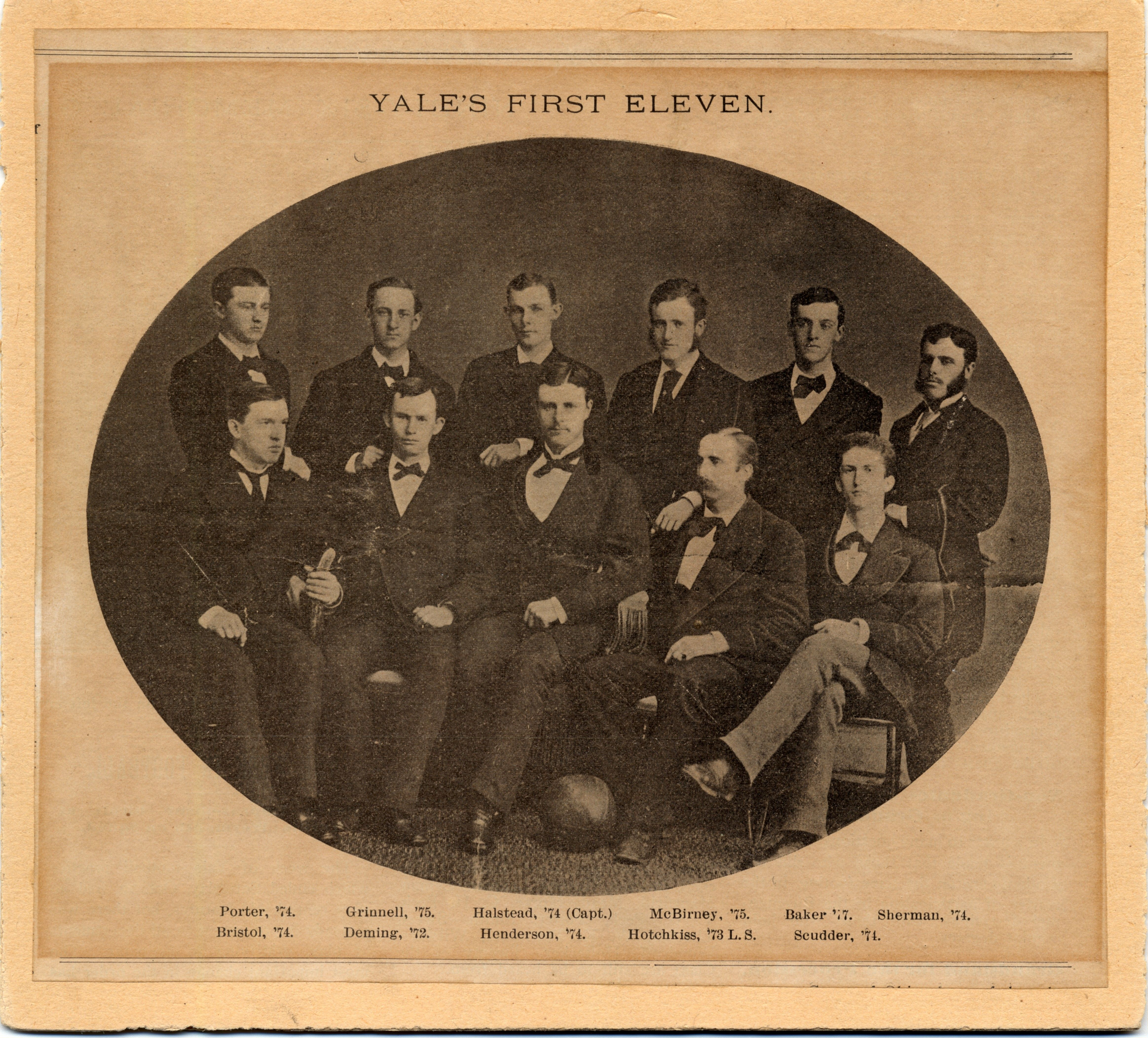
- Conference: Independent
- Record: 2–1
- Head coach: None
- Captain: William S. Halstead
- Home stadium: Hamilton Park

1873 college football records
	Conf.			Overall
Team	W		L		W		L
Princeton		–		1	–	0	–	0
Harvard		–		1	–	0	–	1
Washington and Lee		–		4	–	0	–	0
Stevens		–		3	–	1	–	0
Yale		–		2	–	1	–	0
Columbia		–		2	–	1	–	0
Rutgers		–		1	–	2	–	0
McGill		–		0	–	1	–	1
Eton		–		0	–	1	–	0
CCNY		–		0	–	1	–	0
New Jersey AC		–		0	–	1	–	0
NYU		–		0	–	1	–	0
Princeton Seminary		–		0	–	1	–	0
VMI		–		0	–	1	–	0

The 1873 Yale Bulldogs football team represented Yale University in the 1873 college football season. The Bulldogs compiled a 2–1 record, winning games against Rutgers and Eton College (with Yale alumni) but losing to Princeton. William S. Halstead was the team captain.

== Schedule ==
Date	Opponent	Site	Result	Source
October 25	Rutgers	Hamilton Park; New Haven, CT	W 3–1	
November 15	Princeton	Hamilton Park; New Haven, CT (rivalry)	L 0–3	
December 6	Eton	Hamilton Park; New Haven, CT	W 2–1	
