= 1873 Washington and Lee Generals football team =

American college football season

1873 Washington and Lee Generals football
- Conference: Independent
- Record: 1–0
- Head coach: Unknown

1873 college football records
	Conf.			Overall
Team	W		L		W		L
Princeton		–		1	–	0	–	0
Harvard		–		1	–	0	–	1
Washington and Lee		–		4	–	0	–	0
Stevens		–		3	–	1	–	0
Yale		–		2	–	1	–	0
Columbia		–		2	–	1	–	0
Rutgers		–		1	–	2	–	0
McGill		–		0	–	1	–	1
Eton		–		0	–	1	–	0
CCNY		–		0	–	1	–	0
New Jersey AC		–		0	–	1	–	0
NYU		–		0	–	1	–	0
Princeton Seminary		–		0	–	1	–	0
VMI		–		0	–	1	–	0

The 1873 Washington and Lee Generals football team represented the Washington and Lee University in the 1873 college football season, the school's first season of football. Their four-game season featured four wins over VMI including its earliest victory and the first game in the South, a 4–2 win. The team has no known coach.

== Schedule ==
Date	Opponent	Site	Result
November 2	VMI	VMI Parade Grounds; Lexington, VA	W 4–2

== See also ==
- List of the first college football game in each US state
