= 1874–75 Tufts Jumbos football team =

American college football season

1874–75 Tufts Jumbos football
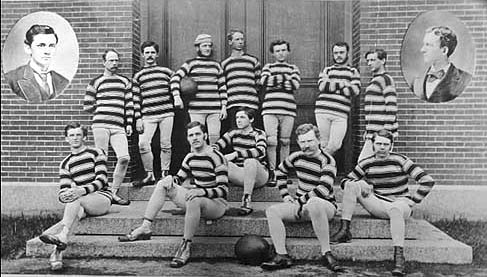
- 1875 Tufts team
- Conference: Independent
- Record: 1–0
- Head coach: None

1874 college football records
	Conf.			Overall
Team	W		L		W		L
Yale		–		3	–	0	–	0
Princeton		–		2	–	0	–	0
Harvard		–		1	–	1	–	0
Tufts		–		1	–	0	–	0
Stevens		–		2	–	2	–	0
Rutgers		–		2	–	2	–	0
Columbia		–		1	–	5	–	0
NYU		–		0	–	1	–	0
McGill		–		0	–	1	–	0

The 1874–75 Tufts Jumbos football team represented Tufts University in the 1874 college football season.

== Schedule ==
Date	Time	Opponent	Site	Result	Source
June 4, 1875	3:00 p.m.	at Harvard	Jarvis Field; Cambridge, MA	W 1–0	
