= Parke H. Davis =

American lawyer (1871–1934)

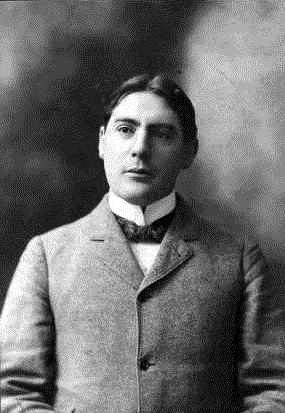
- Davis, c. 1895–1898

Biographical details
- Born: July 15, 1871; Jamestown, New York, U.S.
- Died: June 5, 1934 (aged 62); Easton, Pennsylvania, U.S.

Playing career
- 1890–1892: Princeton
- Positions: Tackle, end

Coaching career (HC unless noted)
- 1893: Wisconsin
- 1894: Amherst
- 1895–1897: Lafayette

Head coaching record
- Overall: 37–11–3

Accomplishments and honors

Championships
- 1 national (1896)

Parke Hill Davis (July 15, 1871 – June 5, 1934) was an American football player, coach, and historian.

Shortly before his death, Davis compiled a list of "National Champion Foot Ball Teams" for the 1934 edition of Spalding's Foot Ball Guide. For this the NCAA recognizes him as a "major selector" of college football national championships in their official football records book. Davis' selections are the only ones noted by the NCAA to be based on historical research.

== Early life and education ==
Davis was born in Jamestown, New York and attended Princeton University, where he was a lineman for the Princeton Tigers and a member of its "tug of war team in 1889".

== Career ==
=== Football coach ===
Davis went on to coach at Wisconsin (1893), Amherst (1894) and Lafayette (1895–98),< where he also served as athletic director.

In 1896, Davis organized Lafayette's Law Club; he appeared in a leading role in a stage production of The Rivals at the Easton, Pennsylvania Opera House; he read Longfellow poetry at the Freshman Initiation gala; and he led Lafayette to its first national football championship, an honor he would, himself, bestow upon his team some 37 years after the fact.

The biggest win of the 1896 season came in Philadelphia against Penn on October 24. A standout for Lafayette was a newcomer named Fielding "Hurry Up" Yost.

Yost began playing football at West Virginia University in 1894 at the age of 23. A 6-foot, 200-pounder, Yost was a star tackle at WVU into the 1896 season. But after his team lost three times to Lafayette in home games played on three different fields over the course of three days, Yost became a remarkable personification of "if you can't beat 'em, join 'em." He transferred in mid-season to join what would be Coach Davis' national championship team.

True to his nickname, just a week after playing against Davis in West Virginia, "Hurry Up" was playing for Davis in Lafayette's historic 6–4 win over the Quakers.

The fortuitous timing of Yost's appearance on the Lafayette roster did not go unnoticed by Penn officials. They called it "the Yost affair." The Philadelphia Ledger quoted Yost as saying that he came to Lafayette only to play football. The fact that Yost appeared in a Lafayette uniform only once, in the Penn game, and that he returned to West Virginia within two weeks of the contest, did not help appearances.

Yost assured all concerned that he would return to Lafayette for at least three years of study. But 1897 found "Hurry Up" no longer a student or a player, but a coach at Ohio Wesleyan. In 1901, he was hired as head coach at the University of Michigan, beginning a storied 25-year, Hall of Fame career.

=== Attorney ===
After concluding his own six-year career as a football coach, Davis became an attorney in Easton, Pennsylvania, where Lafayette is located. He lived there the rest of his life.

In the October 1900 meeting of the Lafayette Democratic Club, Davis was the "orator of the evening", after the group unanimously endorsed the national ticket of William Jennings Bryan. In 1901, he won election as District Attorney of Northampton County, Pennsylvania, of which Easton is the county seat.

He became such a part of Easton and the college that he was proclaimed a "loyal son of Lafayette" after giving a speech in 1901 urging on the football team before its game with Princeton, his own alma mater.

The "ex-coach and loyal supporter of athletics of Lafayette" served as an umpire in football games and as starter at the college's track meets.

=== Football historian and rules committee member ===
Davis wrote an early history of American football in 1911, tracing the sport's origins to ancient times:

...abundant evidence may be marshalled to prove that this is the oldest outdoor game in existence. In the 22nd chapter of Isaiah is found the verse, "He will turn and toss thee like a ball." This allusion, slight as it may be, is sufficient unto the antiquary to indicate that some sort of game with a ball existed as early as 750 years before the Christian era, the epoch customarily assigned to the Book of Isaiah.

An acknowledged expert on the formative years of the sport in the 19th century, Davis described the period between 1869 and 1875 as the Pioneer Period; the years 1876–93 he called the period of the American Intercollegiate Football Association; and the years 1894–1933 he dubbed the Period of Rules Committees and Conferences.

He helped select the 1913 College Football All-America Team while serving as Princeton's representative on the American Intercollegiate Football Rules Committee.

He served on the Rules Committee from 1909 to 1915, playing a key role in shaping the evolution of the game. Among the innovations with which he is credited are the division of the game into quarters, numbering of players, abolition of inter-locked interference and the creation of end zones.

Even after leaving the Rules Committee, Davis promoted his ideas for improving the sport, which included making it illegal to advance a recovered fumble:

This feature of football is uncouth, unfair and a relic of a long bygone era... The proper disposition of this fluke play is to change the rules so that the ball shall be put down for scrimmage at the point where a fumble is recovered by the side recovering the fumble and no run allowed. If the fumble is recovered behind an opponent's goal line the ball shall be put in play at the point where it was fumbled.

Davis was a friend and admirer of Walter Camp, "Father of American Football." In a 1926 authorized biography of Camp, author Harford Powel Jr. turned to Davis for historical perspective, including accounts of Camp's "heavy disappointments (which) should be mentioned, for fear it might be thought that Camp was one of those players who do not know the feeling of failure."

He reviewed the sport's first half-century in "Fifty Years of Intercollegiate Football", which appeared in the 1926 edition of Spalding's Official Football Guide. Davis' description of football's earliest years paint an image of a sport very different from the game as it became known in the 20th century:

The tactics of the times made the play essentially a kicking game. The backs kicked punts, drop kicks, and place kicks... Not only was the ball kicked as at present, but it was kicked, and cleverly kicked, while bouncing upon the ground.

The game was opened, as now, by a kick-off. The player of 1880 might, if he chose, drive the ball far down the field. Or, technically kicking the ball by merely touching it with his toe, he might pick it up and run with it. Players when tackled invariably endeavored to pass the ball back to another member of their side for a further advance, a method of play so highly developed that it was not infrequent to see a ball passed as many as five times during a single play.

In addition to his work on the Guide, Davis authored articles on football for the Encyclopædia Britannica and compiled a glossary of football terms.

Dan Jenkins reported in the September 11, 1967, edition of Sports Illustrated, "Davis went all the way back to the first inflated pig bladder to pick the national champions for every season. He used no special formula. He simply looked at the schedules and the results and chose his teams."

Davis' list was titled "National Champion Foot Ball Teams" and compiled for the seasons from 1869 to 1933. In all, he selected 94 teams over 61 seasons as "National Champion Foot Ball Teams". For 21 of these teams (at 12 schools), he was the only major selector to choose them. Their schools use 17 of Davis' singular selections to claim national titles. Davis died months after his selection of the national champion 1933 teams for the 1934 Guide.

For the 1896 season, Davis selected his own team and his alma mater to share the title. Lafayette and Princeton had fought to a 0–0 stalemate early in the season.

In addition to naming each year's champion, Davis added statistics from the 1873 through the 1933 seasons to his annual Guide. These included the longest scoring plays from rushing, returns, passing plays and interceptions. The 1934 edition was Davis' last to include these compilations, as he died soon after its completion. Through the 1937 edition, the records were included with the notation, "Compilations of the late Parke H. Davis."

Davis also named an All-Time All-America football team in 1931.

== "Parke Davis Day" ==
Davis' health may have been a concern in the spring of 1934. Princeton announced that it was inviting the sporting world to honor its famous alum on "Parke Davis Day", which was set for the following October 13. As The Lafayette reported:

The purpose of this event will be to commemorate the long and faithful services which Mr. Davis has given to football. Mr. Davis, a graduate of Princeton, came to Lafayette in 1895. He raised the Maroon from a position of obscurity to a level with the football giants... Lafayette owes much to Parke Davis and should contribute something to this event which is being held in his honor.

But within weeks of the announcement... and months before "Parke Davis Day" was to be held... the honoree was dead.

Rather than attending the planned celebration in New Jersey, "(c)ollege associates, former football stars and members of the bench and bar were among the friends", who arrived in Easton as mourners for June 8 funeral services held at Davis' home. They included Congressman Abram Andrew and legendary Wisconsin coach Phil King, both former teammates at Princeton, and fellow football historian and Princeton grad William H. Edwards.

== National championship selections ==
Davis (top right) and his Lafayette football team of 1896. Thirty-seven years later, as the sport's pre-eminent historian, Davis would honor his team as co-national champions.

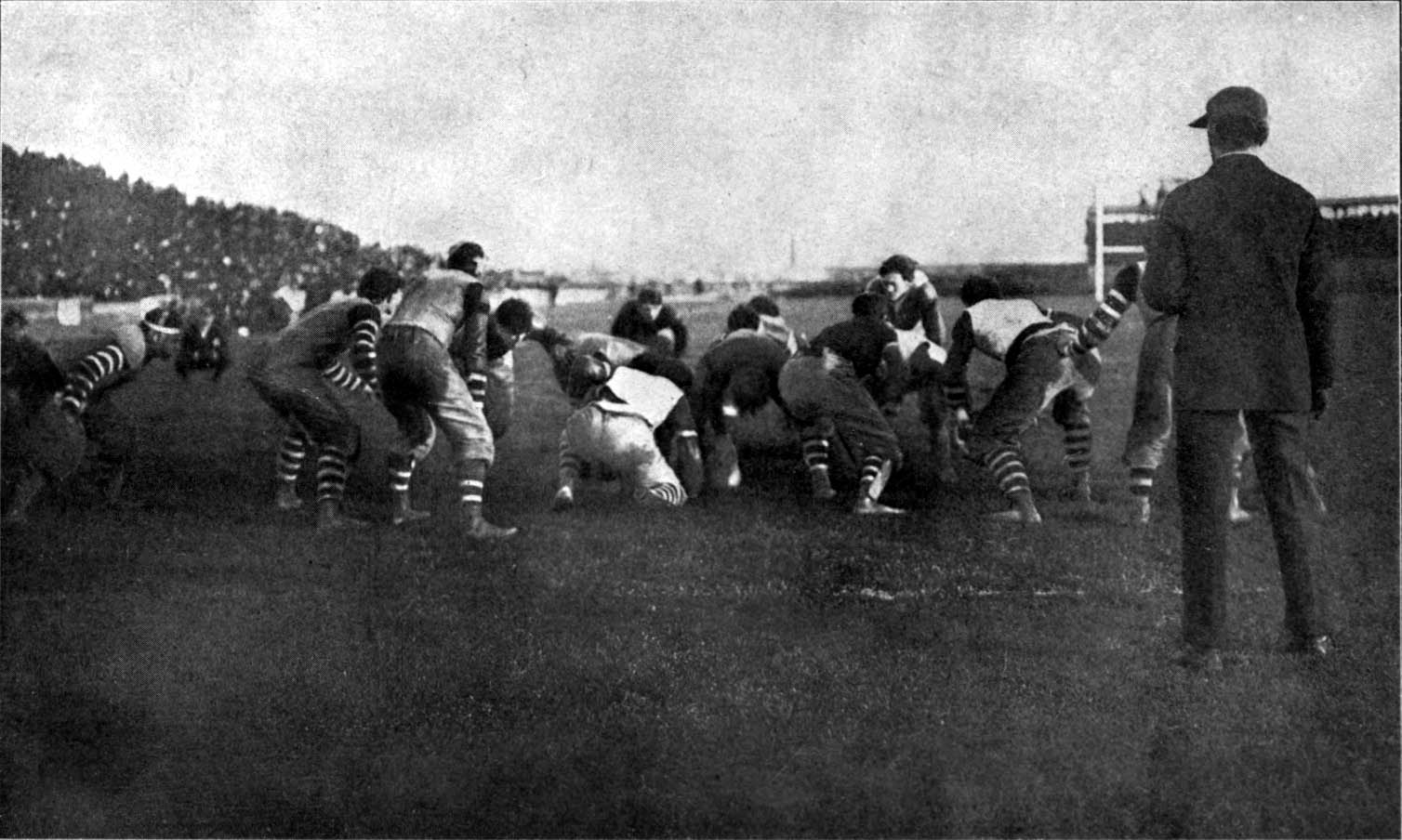
Lafayette on defense in its 6–4 upset victory over Penn on October 24, 1896, at Franklin Field in Philadelphia

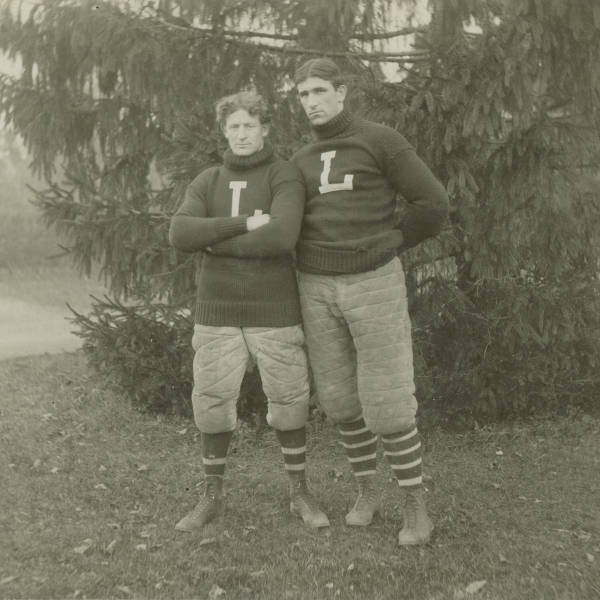
Davis' All-America players: George B. Walbridge (left, 3rd Team 1897 All-America back, chosen by Walter Camp). Walbridge was right half-back and captain of Lafayette's 1896 team. He went on to graduate from Cornell University in 1900. In 1916, he co-founded Walbridge Aldinger, which became one of the largest construction companies in the United States. In 2008, the company changed its name to simply "Walbridge." Charles R. Rinehart (right, 1896 All-America guard and 2nd team 1897 All-America guard, chosen by Walter Camp). Charles "Babe" or "Riny" Rinehart was a right guard on the 1896 squad. At 6'3" and 210 pounds, he was the biggest man on the team. He was captain and quarterback for the 1897 team.

The 1934 edition of Spalding's Official Foot Ball Guide contains the chapter National Champion Foot Ball Teams, 1869–1933. The list is marked as being "Compiled by Parke H. Davis".

The official NCAA records book credits Davis with retroactive selections for the years 1869–1932, and with a contemporary selection of co-champions for the just-completed 1933 season. He is the only major selector indicated as using historic research for his selections rather than a poll or mathematical system (although Bill Schroeder of the Helms Athletic Foundation did as well).

Critics have faulted his work for having a heavy Eastern bias, with little regard for the South and the West Coast.

Season	National Champion Foot Ball Teams
The Pioneer Period
1869	Princeton, Rutgers
1870	Princeton
1871	No games
1872	Princeton, Yale
1873	Princeton
1874	Princeton, Yale, Harvard
1875	Columbia, Harvard, Princeton
Period of the American Intercollegiate Foot Ball Association
1876	Yale
1877	Princeton, Yale
1878	Princeton (coached by Woodrow Wilson)
1879	Princeton, Yale
1880	Princeton, Yale
1881	Princeton, Yale
1882	Yale
1883	Yale
1884	Princeton, Yale
1885	Princeton
1886	Princeton, Yale
1887	Yale
1888	Yale
1889	Princeton
1890	Harvard
1891	Yale
1892	Yale
1893	Yale
Period of Rules Committees and Conferences
1894	Penn, Yale
1895	Penn, Yale
1896	Lafayette, Princeton
1897	Penn, Yale
1898	Princeton
1899	Princeton
1900	Yale
1901	Harvard (Note: Until it was amended in 2026, the NCAA Record Book stated "Yale" for 1901, an error that had been perpetuated since the first appearance of Davis' selections in the NCAA book about 1995.)
1902	Michigan, Yale
1903	Princeton
1904	Penn
1905	Yale
1906	Yale
1907	Yale
1908	Penn
1909	Yale
1910	None
1911	Princeton
1912	Harvard
1913	Chicago, Harvard
1914	Army, Illinois
1915	Cornell, Pittsburgh
1916	Army, Pittsburgh
1917	World War
1918	World War
1919	Harvard, Illinois, Notre Dame
1920	Notre Dame, Princeton
1921	Cornell, Iowa, Lafayette
1922	Cornell, Princeton
1923	Illinois
1924	Penn
1925	Dartmouth
1926	Lafayette
1927	Illinois
1928	Detroit, Georgia Tech
1929	Pittsburgh
1930	Alabama, Notre Dame
1931	Pittsburgh, Purdue
1932	Colgate, Michigan, USC
1933	Michigan, Princeton

=== Posthumous selections for 1934 and 1935 ===
Davis died mere weeks after completing his compilations for the 1934 Spalding guide. The printed book contains an obituary and tribute to "the game's foremost historian".

Davis' national champions list was subsequently reprinted in the 1935 and 1936 editions of the Spalding guide. The title of the chapter was changed to Outstanding Nationwide and Sectional Teams, and the byline to "Originally Compiled by the late Parke H. Davis". Each edition adds new co-champions for the just-completed season.

These new champions, who played their seasons after his death, were not selected by Parke H. Davis but are commonly attributed to him. The NCAA does not include the 1934 or 1935 selections in their list of picks by "major selectors".

Season	Outstanding Nationwide Teams
1934	Minnesota, Pittsburgh
1935	Princeton, Minnesota

== Head coaching record ==
Year	Team	Overall	Conference	Standing
Wisconsin Badgers (Intercollegiate Athletic Association of the Northwest) (1893)
1893	Wisconsin	4–2	1–1	2nd
Wisconsin:		4–2	1–1	
Amherst (Triangular Football League) (1894)
1894	Amherst	7–5–1	0–2	3rd
Amherst:		7–5–1	0–2	
Lafayette (Independent) (1895–1897)
1895	Lafayette	6–2		
1896	Lafayette	11–0–1		
1897	Lafayette	9–2–1		
Lafayette:		26–4–2		
Total:		37–11–3		
National championship Conference title Conference division title or championship game berth
