= 1874 Columbia football team =

American college football season

1874 Columbia football
- Conference: Independent
- Record: 1–5
- Head coach: None
- Captain: Charles King

1874 college football records
	Conf.			Overall
Team	W		L		W		L
Yale		–		3	–	0	–	0
Princeton		–		2	–	0	–	0
Harvard		–		1	–	1	–	0
Tufts		–		1	–	0	–	0
Stevens		–		2	–	2	–	0
Rutgers		–		2	–	2	–	0
Columbia		–		1	–	5	–	0
NYU		–		0	–	1	–	0
McGill		–		0	–	1	–	0

The 1874 Columbia football team represented Columbia University in the 1874 college football season. The team had no head coach, and compiled a record of 1–5. Charles King served as team captain.

== Schedule ==
Date	Opponent	Site	Result	Source
October 24	at Rutgers	New Brunswick, NJ	L 1–6	
October 31	at Stevens		L 2–4	
November 7	Rutgers	New York, NY	W 4–1	
November 14	at Princeton	Princeton, NJ	L 0–6	
November 21	at Yale	Hamilton Park; New Haven, CT	L 1–5	
December 5	at Yale	Hamilton Park; New Haven, CT	L 1–6	
