= Harry Grant =

Harry Grant may refer to:

- Harry Grant (racing driver), American racing driver
- Harry Grant (cyclist) (1906–1993), British racing cyclist
- Harry Grant (footballer) (born 1993), English footballer
- Bud Grant (Harry Peter Grant, 1927–2023), former American football head coach
- Harry Grant (rugby league) (born 1998), Australian rugby league player

== See also ==
- Henry Grant (disambiguation)
- Harold Grant (disambiguation)
