= 1874–75 Harvard Crimson football team =

American college football season

1874 Harvard Crimson football
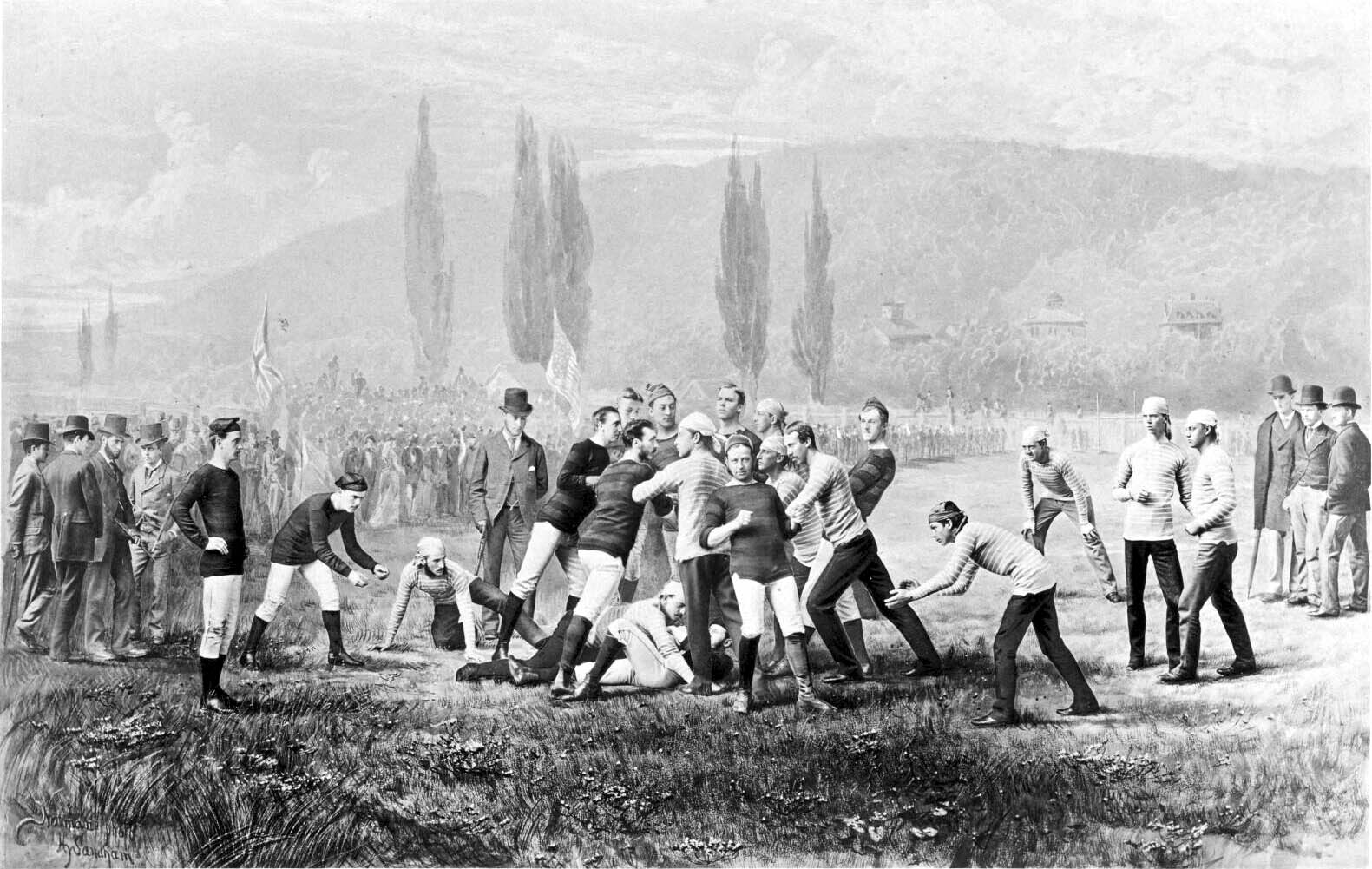
- Harvard at McGill, October 23, 1874

Co-national champion (Davis)
- Conference: Independent
- Record: 1–1
- Head coach: None
- Captain: Arthur B. Ellis
- Home stadium: Jarvis Field

1874 college football records
	Conf.			Overall
Team	W		L		W		L
Yale		–		3	–	0	–	0
Princeton		–		2	–	0	–	0
Harvard		–		1	–	1	–	0
Tufts		–		1	–	0	–	0
Stevens		–		2	–	2	–	0
Rutgers		–		2	–	2	–	0
Columbia		–		1	–	5	–	0
NYU		–		0	–	1	–	0
McGill		–		0	–	1	–	0

The 1874–75 Harvard Crimson football team represented Harvard University in the 1874 college football season. The team finished with a 1–1 record and was retroactively named co-national champion by Parke H. Davis. The team captain was Arthur B. Ellis.

After the first rugby football game in the United States was played by McGill University visiting Harvard in May 1874, Harvard traveled to Montreal for another rugby style game in October. No goals were scored, the game ended in a 0–0 tie, but Harvard had scored three tries to win the game in front of 2,000 spectators.

== Schedule ==
Date	Time	Opponent	Site	Result	Attendance	Source
October 23, 1874	3:30 p.m.	at McGill	Montreal Cricket Club grounds; Montreal, QC	W 0–0 (Note: Harvard scored 3 tries.)	3,000	
June 4, 1875	3:00 p.m.	Tufts	Jarvis Field; Cambridge, MA	L 0–1		
