= Harold Grant (disambiguation) =

Harold Grant was a football coach.

Harold Grant may also refer to:

- Harold Grant, character in Strange Brother
- Harold Taylor Wood Grant, Canadian naval officer

== See also ==
- Harry Grant (disambiguation)
