= 1874 Princeton Tigers football team =

American college football season

1874 Princeton Tigers football

National champion (Billingsley) Co-national champion (Davis)
- Conference: Independent
- Record: 2–0
- Head coach: None
- Captain: Isaac H. Lionberger

1874 college football records
	Conf.			Overall
Team	W		L		W		L
Yale		–		3	–	0	–	0
Princeton		–		2	–	0	–	0
Harvard		–		1	–	1	–	0
Tufts		–		1	–	0	–	0
Stevens		–		3	–	1	–	0
Rutgers		–		1	–	3	–	0
Columbia		–		1	–	5	–	0
NYU		–		0	–	1	–	0
McGill		–		0	–	1	–	0

The 1874 Princeton Tigers football team represented the College of New Jersey, then more commonly known as Princeton College, in the 1874 college football season. The team beat Columbia and Rutgers by identical 6–0 scores, finished with a 2–0 record, and was retroactively named national champion by the Billingsley Report and as co-national champion by Parke H. Davis. Isaac H. Lionberger was the team's captain.

This season marked the third of four consecutive national championships, and one of 11 in a 13-year period between 1869 and 1881.

== Schedule ==
Date	Opponent	Site	Result
November 14	Columbia	Princeton, NJ	W 6–0
November 21	Rutgers	Princeton, NJ (rivalry)	W 6–0
