= 1874 college football season =

American college football season

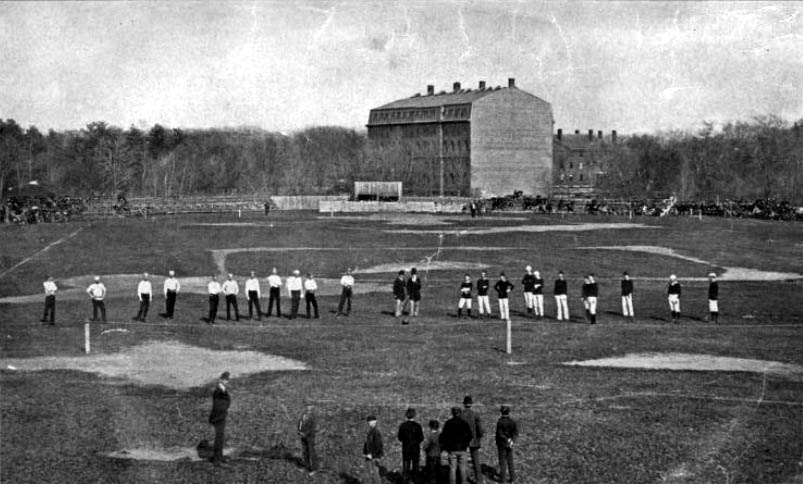
- Harvard vs. McGill game on May 15
- Total No. of teams: 9
- Regular season: October 24 to December 5
- Champion(s): Princeton; Yale

The 1874 college football season had no clear-cut champion, with the Official NCAA Division I Football Records Book listing Princeton, Harvard, and Yale as having been selected national champions. Only Princeton and Yale officially claim championships for this season.

The Harvard vs. McGill game played on May 15, 1874, was the first rugby-style football game played in the United States.

== Conference and program changes ==
Team	Former conference	New conference
Tufts Jumbos	Program established	Independent

== Conference standings ==
1874 college football records
	Conf.			Overall
Team	W		L		W		L
Yale		–		3	–	0	–	0
Princeton		–		2	–	0	–	0
Harvard		–		1	–	1	–	0
Tufts		–		1	–	0	–	0
Stevens		–		3	–	1	–	0
Rutgers		–		1	–	3	–	0
Columbia		–		1	–	5	–	0
NYU		–		0	–	1	–	0
McGill		–		0	–	1	–	0
