= 1874 Rutgers Queensmen football team =

American college football season

1874 Rutgers Queensmen football
- Conference: Independent
- Record: 2–2
- Head coach: None
- Captain: Abram T. Marine

1874 college football records
	Conf.			Overall
Team	W		L		W		L
Yale		–		3	–	0	–	0
Princeton		–		2	–	0	–	0
Harvard		–		1	–	1	–	0
Tufts		–		1	–	0	–	0
Stevens		–		2	–	2	–	0
Rutgers		–		2	–	2	–	0
Columbia		–		1	–	5	–	0
NYU		–		0	–	1	–	0
McGill		–		0	–	1	–	0

The 1874 Rutgers Queensmen football team represented Rutgers University in the 1874 college football season. The Queensmen compiled a 1–3 record and were outscored by their opponents 17 to 7. The team had no coach, and its captain was Abram T. Marine.

== Schedule ==
Date	Opponent	Site	Result	Source
October 24	Columbia	New Brunswick, NJ	W 6–1	
November 1	Stevens	New Brunswick, NJ	W 6–0	
November 7	at Columbia	New York, NY	L 1–4	
November 21	at Princeton	Princeton, NJ (rivalry)	L 0–6	
