= Henry R. Grant =

American football halfback

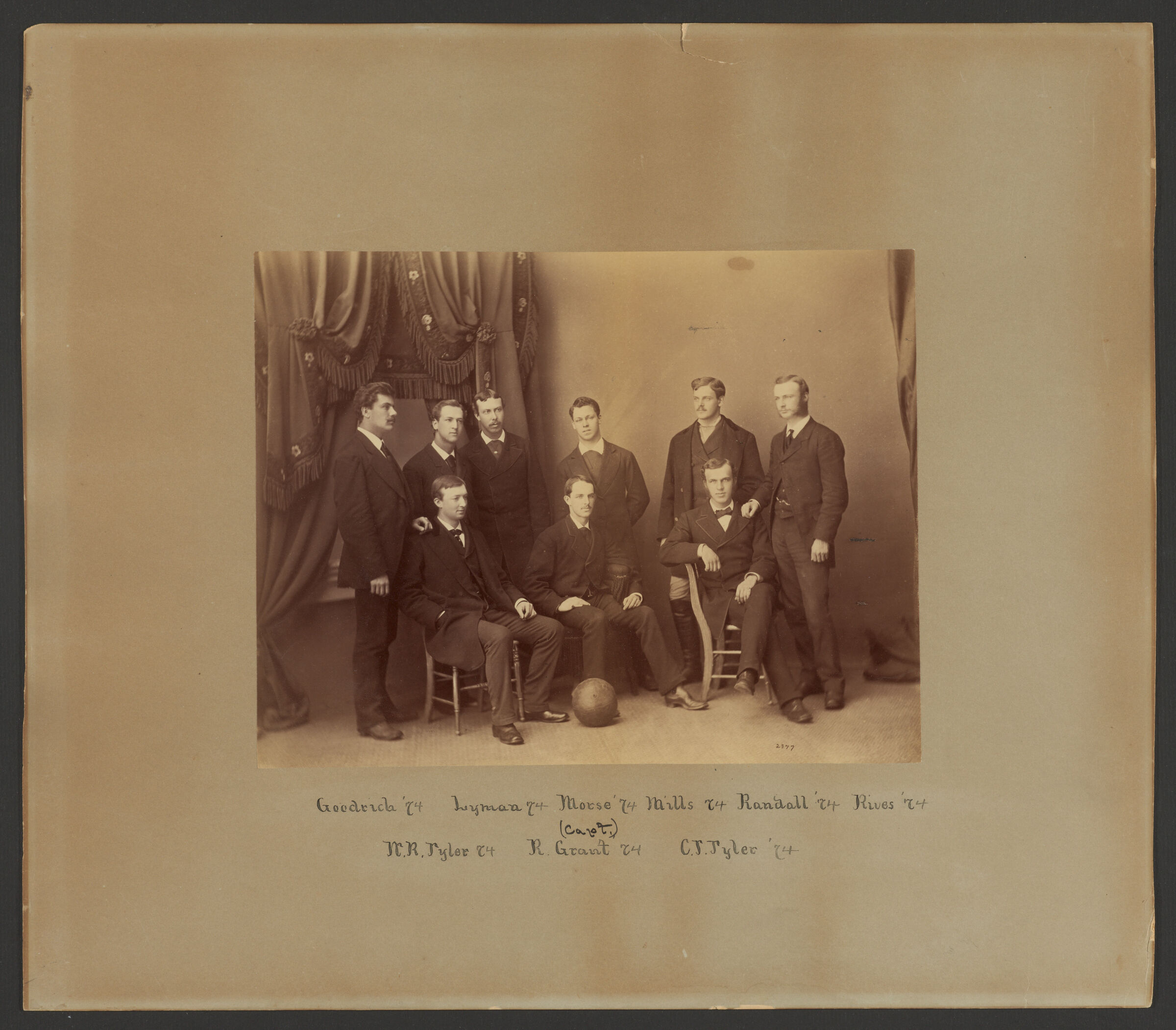

Profile
- Position: Halfback

Career information
- College: Harvard (1873–1874)

Awards and highlights
- National championship (1874)

Henry R. Grant was a pioneer college football player at Harvard University, the team's first captain. He played the game intramurally even before Harvard's first season in 1873.

== See also ==
- 1874 Harvard vs. McGill football game
