= 1874 Yale Bulldogs football team =

American college football season

1874 Yale Bulldogs football
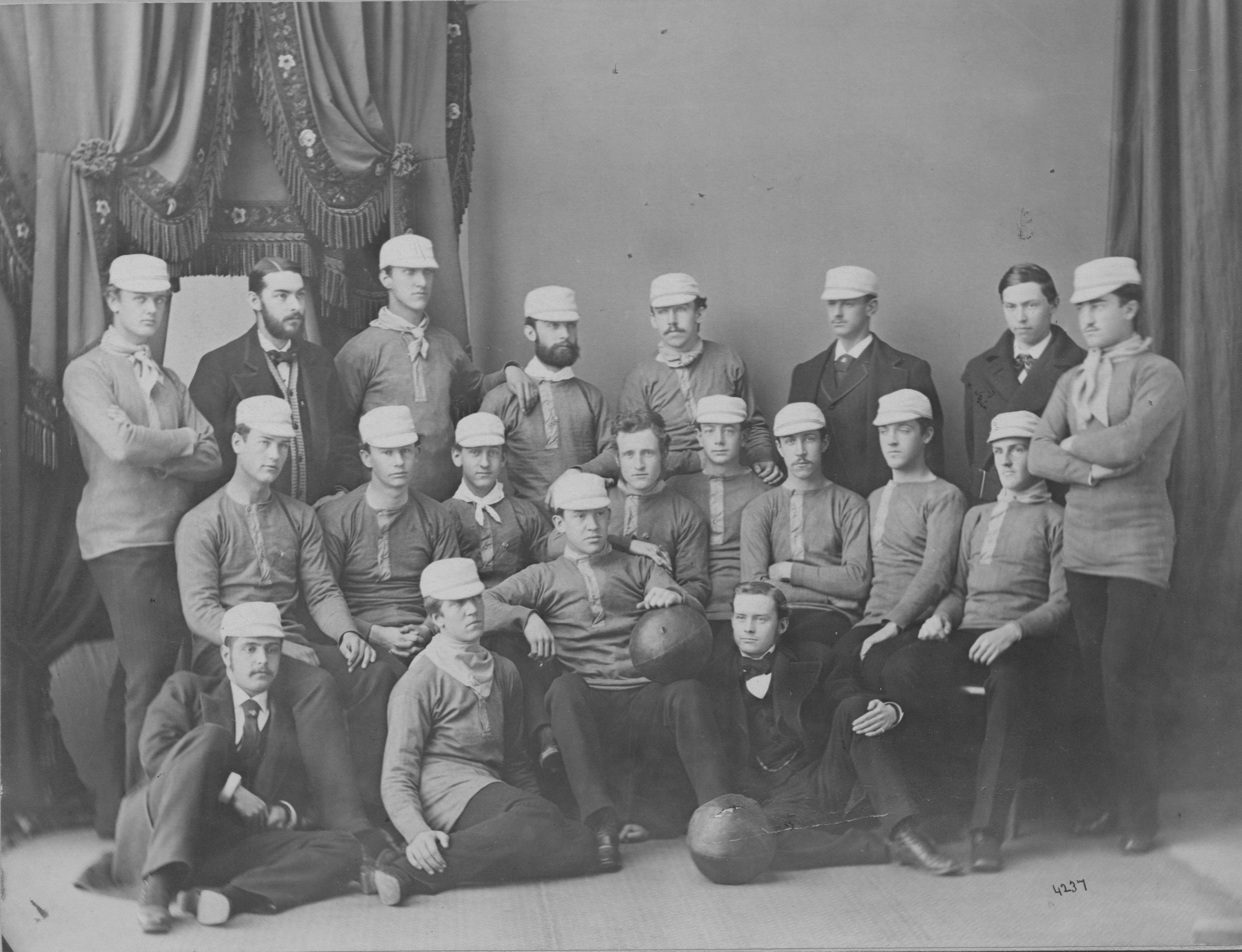

National champion (NCF) Co-national champion (Davis)
- Conference: Independent
- Record: 3–0
- Head coach: None
- Captain: Hugh J. McBirney
- Home stadium: Hamilton Park

1874 college football records
	Conf.			Overall
Team	W		L		W		L
Yale		–		3	–	0	–	0
Princeton		–		2	–	0	–	0
Harvard		–		1	–	1	–	0
Tufts		–		1	–	0	–	0
Stevens		–		3	–	1	–	0
Rutgers		–		1	–	3	–	0
Columbia		–		1	–	5	–	0
NYU		–		0	–	1	–	0
McGill		–		0	–	1	–	0

The 1874 Yale Bulldogs football team represented Yale University in the 1874 college football season. The team finished with a 3–0 record and was retroactively named national champion by the National Championship Foundation and as co-national champion by Parke H. Davis. The team captain was Hugh J. McBirney.

== Schedule ==
Date	Opponent	Site	Result	Source
November 18	Stevens	Hamilton Park; New Haven, CT	W 6–0	
November 21	Columbia	Hamilton Park; New Haven, CT	W 5–1	
December 5	Columbia	Hamilton Park; New Haven, CT	W 6–1	
