= Isaac H. Lionberger =

American football player and lawyer (1854–1948)

- Occupation: Lawyer
- Football career
- Class: 1875

Career information
- College: Princeton (1872–1874)

Isaac Henry Lionberger (August 30, 1854 – September 12, 1948) was a well-known St. Louis lawyer who later became Assistant Attorney General of the United States. His house was designed by Henry Hobson Richardson. He attended Princeton University, where he was captain of the 1874 football team.
