= 1873 CCNY Lavender football team =

American college football season

1873 CCNY Lavender football
- Conference: Independent
- Record: 0–1
- Head coach: None

1873 college football records
	Conf.			Overall
Team	W		L		W		L
Princeton		–		1	–	0	–	0
Harvard		–		1	–	0	–	1
Washington and Lee		–		4	–	0	–	0
Stevens		–		3	–	1	–	0
Yale		–		2	–	1	–	0
Columbia		–		2	–	1	–	0
Rutgers		–		1	–	2	–	0
McGill		–		0	–	1	–	1
Eton		–		0	–	1	–	0
CCNY		–		0	–	1	–	0
New Jersey AC		–		0	–	1	–	0
NYU		–		0	–	1	–	0
Princeton Seminary		–		0	–	1	–	0
VMI		–		0	–	1	–	0

The 1873 CCNY Lavender football team represented the City College of New York in the 1873 college football season.

== Schedule ==
Date	Opponent	Site	Result	Source
November 15	at Stevens	Elysian Fields; Hoboken, NJ	L 0–3	
