= 1873 Eton football team =

American college football season

1873 Eton football
- Conference: Independent
- Record: 0–1
- Head coach: Unknown

1873 college football records
	Conf.			Overall
Team	W		L		W		L
Princeton		–		1	–	0	–	0
Harvard		–		1	–	0	–	1
Washington and Lee		–		4	–	0	–	0
Stevens		–		3	–	1	–	0
Yale		–		2	–	1	–	0
Columbia		–		2	–	1	–	0
Rutgers		–		1	–	2	–	0
McGill		–		0	–	1	–	1
Eton		–		0	–	1	–	0
CCNY		–		0	–	1	–	0
New Jersey AC		–		0	–	1	–	0
NYU		–		0	–	1	–	0
Princeton Seminary		–		0	–	1	–	0
VMI		–		0	–	1	–	0

The 1873 Eton football team represented Eton College in the 1873 college football season. The college, based near Windsor, England, played one game, losing 1–2 against Yale.

== Schedule ==
Date	Opponent	Site	Result	Source
December 6	at Yale	Hamilton Park; New Haven, CT	L 1–2	
