= Henry Grant (photographer) =

British photographer

Henry Grant (1907–2004) was a British freelance photographer who was active around London from just after World War II through the 1970s.

His work was entirely in black and white, aimed at the newspaper market. He sold as a freelance photojournalist through a Fleet Street news agency. His wife, Rose Grant, was a reporter for the popular communist newspaper The Daily Worker. Their political interests influenced his frequent choice of politically and socially significant subjects. Stylistically he was known for his spontaneous and candid photographs, often taken in the intervals between his "real" assignments.

In later years, he and Rose often collaborated in the Times Educational Supplement.

He retired professionally in 1980, but still took photographs. In 1986, his archive of 80,000 photographs was purchased by the Museum of London.

Photographs of particular note document the construction of the Festival of Britain.
