= 1874 McGill Redmen football team =

Canadian college football season

1874 McGill Redmen football
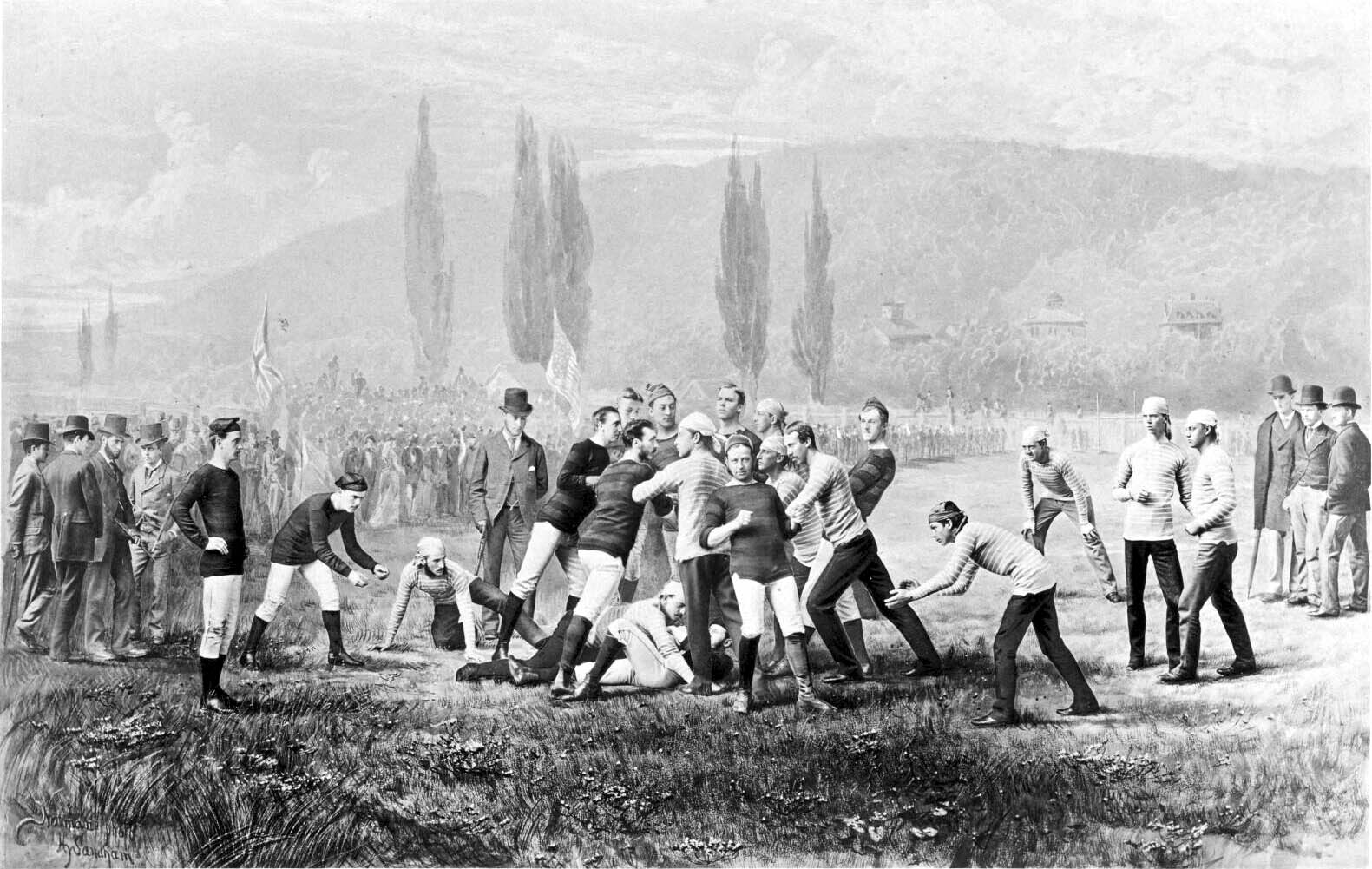
- Harvard at McGill, October 23, 1874
- Conference: Independent
- Record: 0–1

1874 college football records
| | Conf. | | | Overall |
| Team | W | | L | | W | | L |
|---|---|---|---|---|---|---|---|---|
| Yale | | – | | 3 | – | 0 | – | 0 |
| Princeton | | – | | 2 | – | 0 | – | 0 |
| Harvard | | – | | 1 | – | 1 | – | 0 |
| Tufts | | – | | 1 | – | 0 | – | 0 |
| Stevens | | – | | 3 | – | 1 | – | 0 |
| Rutgers | | – | | 1 | – | 3 | – | 0 |
| Columbia | | – | | 1 | – | 5 | – | 0 |
| NYU | | – | | 0 | – | 1 | – | 0 |
| McGill | | – | | 0 | – | 1 | – | 0 |

The 1874 McGill Redmen football team represented McGill University during the 1874 college football season. McGill played only one game, against Harvard under McGill's rugby football rules in Montreal.

== Schedule ==
| Date | Time | Opponent | Site | Result | Attendance | Source |
|---|---|---|---|---|---|---|
| October 23 | 3:30 p.m. | Harvard | (Canada) Montreal Cricket Club grounds; Montreal, QC | L 0–0 (Harvard scored 3 tries) | 2,000 | |
