= 1873 McGill Redmen football team =

Canadian college football season

1873 McGill Redmen football
- Conference: Independent
- Record: 0–1–1

1873 college football records
	Conf.			Overall
Team	W		L		W		L
Princeton		–		1	–	0	–	0
Harvard		–		1	–	0	–	1
Washington and Lee		–		4	–	0	–	0
Stevens		–		3	–	1	–	0
Yale		–		2	–	1	–	0
Columbia		–		2	–	1	–	0
Rutgers		–		1	–	2	–	0
McGill		–		0	–	1	–	1
Eton		–		0	–	1	–	0
CCNY		–		0	–	1	–	0
New Jersey AC		–		0	–	1	–	0
NYU		–		0	–	1	–	0
Princeton Seminary		–		0	–	1	–	0
VMI		–		0	–	1	–	0

The 1873 McGill Redmen football team represented the McGill University during the 1873 college football season. The season featured the Harvard vs. McGill game played May 15, 1874, the first rugby-style football game played in the United States.

== Schedule ==
Date	Opponent	Site	Result	Source
May 14, 1874	at Harvard	Cambridge, MA	L 0–3	
May 15, 1874	at Harvard	Jarvis Field; Cambridge, MA (first rugby football game in U.S.)	T 0–0	

== See also ==
- 1874 Harvard vs. McGill football game
