= 1873 VMI Keydets football team =

American college football season

1873 VMI Keydets football
- Conference: Independent
- Record: 0–1
- Head coach: Unknown

1873 college football records
	Conf.			Overall
Team	W		L		W		L
Princeton		–		1	–	0	–	0
Harvard		–		1	–	0	–	1
Washington and Lee		–		4	–	0	–	0
Stevens		–		3	–	1	–	0
Yale		–		2	–	1	–	0
Columbia		–		2	–	1	–	0
Rutgers		–		1	–	2	–	0
McGill		–		0	–	1	–	1
Eton		–		0	–	1	–	0
CCNY		–		0	–	1	–	0
New Jersey AC		–		0	–	1	–	0
NYU		–		0	–	1	–	0
Princeton Seminary		–		0	–	1	–	0
VMI		–		0	–	1	–	0

The 1873 VMI Keydets football team represented the Virginia Military Institute (VMI) in the 1873 college football season, the school's first season of football. Their four-game season featured a 2–4 loss to Washington & Lee. The team had no known coach.

== Schedule ==
Date	Opponent	Site	Result
November 2	Washington and Lee	VMI Parade Grounds; Lexington, VA	L 2–4

== See also ==
- List of the first college football game in each US state
