= 1873 college football season =

American college football season

- Total No. of teams: 14
- Regular season: October 25, 1873 to May 15, 1874
- Champion(s): Princeton

The 1873 college football season had no clear-cut champion, with the Official NCAA Division I Football Records Book listing Princeton as having been selected national champions.

Organized intercollegiate football was first played in the state of Virginia and the Southern United States when Washington & Lee defeated VMI 4 to 2. Some industrious students of the two schools organized a game for October 23, 1869 – but it was rained out.

Students of the University of Virginia were playing pickup games of the kicking-style of football as early as 1870, and some accounts even claim it organized a game against Washington and Lee College in 1871, but no record has been found of the score of this contest. Due to scantness of records of the prior matches some will claim Virginia v. Pantops Academy November 13, 1887, as the first game in Virginia.

== Conference and program changes ==
Team	Former conference	New conference
Harvard Crimson	Program established	Independent
Washington & Lee Generals	Program established	Independent
McGill Redmen	Program established	Independent
Eton	Program established	Independent
CCNY Lavender	Program established	Independent
NYU Violets	Program established	Independent
VMI Keydets	Program established	Independent
Princeton Seminary	Program established	Independent
New Jersey AC	Program established	Independent

== Conference standings ==
1873 college football records
	Conf.			Overall
Team	W		L		W		L
Princeton		–		1	–	0	–	0
Harvard		–		1	–	0	–	1
Washington and Lee		–		4	–	0	–	0
Stevens		–		3	–	1	–	0
Yale		–		2	–	1	–	0
Columbia		–		2	–	1	–	0
Rutgers		–		1	–	2	–	0
McGill		–		0	–	1	–	1
Eton		–		0	–	1	–	0
CCNY		–		0	–	1	–	0
New Jersey AC		–		0	–	1	–	0
NYU		–		0	–	1	–	0
Princeton Seminary		–		0	–	1	–	0
VMI		–		0	–	1	–	0
